= New Carrollton–Fort Totten Line =

Bus route in Washington, D.C. region

P35
- New Carrollton–Fort Totten Line

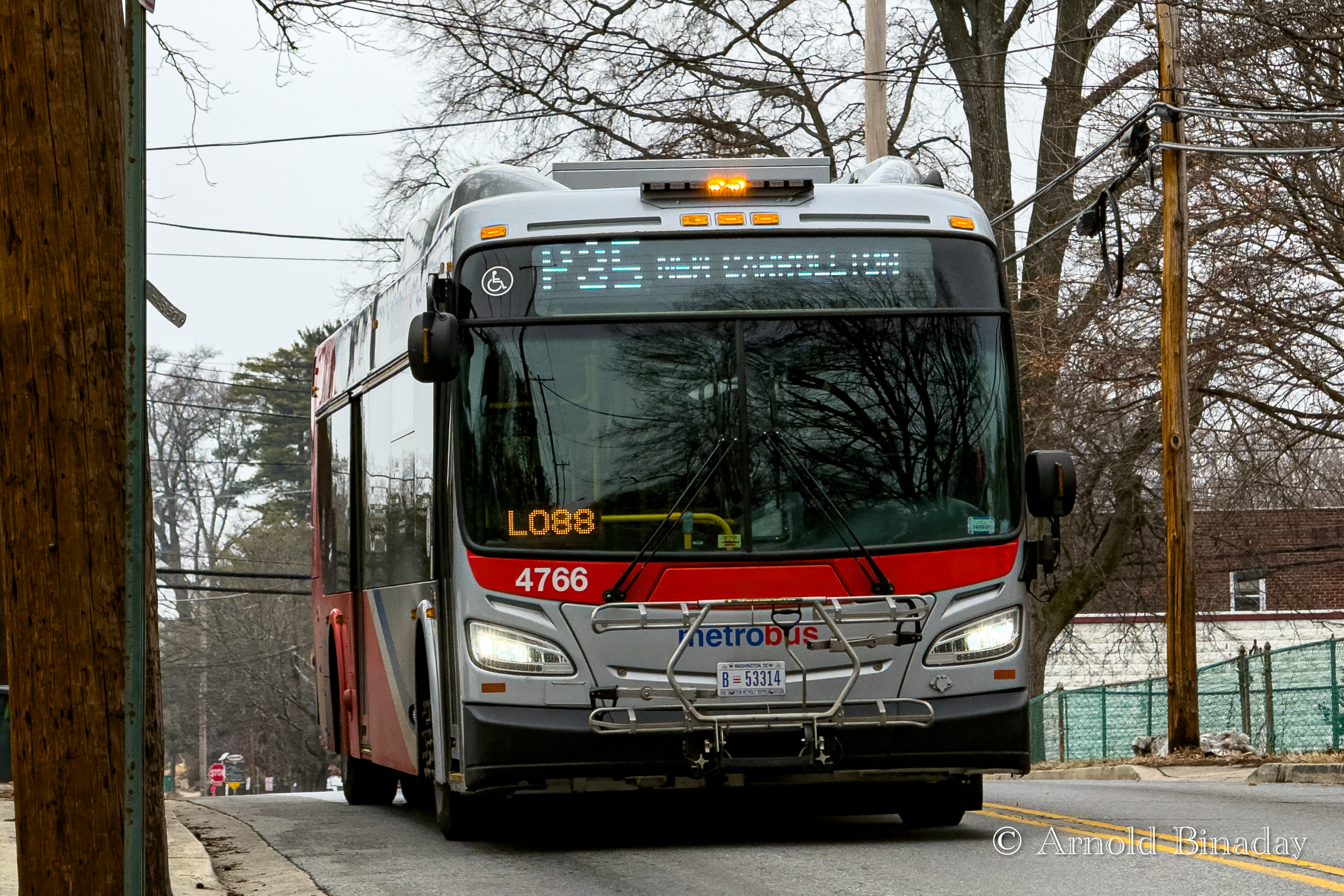
- Route P35 in Hyattsville

Overview
- System: Metrobus
- Operator: Washington Metropolitan Area Transit Authority
- Garage: Landover
- Livery: Local
- Status: Active
- Began service: June 17, 2012
- Predecessors: J2, J4, F6, R3

Route
- Locale: Prince George's County, Northeast
- Communities served: New Carrollton, Riverdale, Hyattsville, Chillum, Carole Highlands, Michigan Park, Fort Totten
- Landmarks served: New Carrollton station, Hyattsville Crossing station, The Mall at Prince George's, Fort Totten station
- Start: New Carrollton station
- Via: Sargent Road, Riverdale Road, Good Luck Road, Finns Lane, Kenilworth Avenue, Queensbury Road, East-West Highway, Riggs Road
- End: Fort Totten station

Service
- Level: Weekday service only
- Frequency: 30-45 minutes
- Operates: 6:00 AM – 10:00 PM
- Ridership: 475,321 (FY 2025)
- Transfers: SmarTrip only
- Timetable: New Carrollton-Fort Totten Line

The New Carrollton–Fort Totten Line, designated Route P35, is a weekday-only bus route operated by the Washington Metropolitan Area Transit Authority between the New Carrollton station of the Orange and Silver Lines of the Washington Metro and the Fort Totten station of the Red, Green and Yellow Lines of the Washington Metro. The line operates every 30 minutes during peak hours and 45 minutes all other times, weekdays only. P35 trips are roughly 60 minutes. The P35 provides weekday service between Fort Totten and New Carrollton stations without having to take the train into Downtown DC. It replaced the F6 routing during WMATA's Better Bus Redesign.

== Background ==
Route P35 operated on weekdays only between New Carrollton station and Fort Totten station, mostly along Sargent Road, Riverdale Road, Good Luck Road, Finns Lane, Kenilworth Avenue, Queensbury Road, East-West Highway, and Riggs Road. It connected New Carrollton, Riverdale, Hyattsville, Green Meadows, Chillum, Queens Chapel, and North Michigan Park communities to various Metrorail stations and parts of Northeast DC.

Route P35 operated out of Landover division.

=== Former Route F6 stops ===
Bus stop	Direction	Connections
Prince George's County, Maryland
New Carrollton Bus Bay H	Westbound station, Eastbound terminal	Metrobus: A12, B21, B22, B24, B27, F4, F12, F13, F14, G12, G14, T14, T18; MTA Maryland Commuter Bus; TheBus: 15X, 16, 21, 21X; Greyhound; Peter Pan Bus Lines; Washington Metro: MARC: Penn Line; Amtrak: Northeast Regional, Palmetto, Vermonter; MTA: Purple Line (Planned)
Harkins Road / Ellin Road	Bidirectional	Metrobus: B24, B27, F4, F13, G12, G14, T18
Harkins Road / Sherwood Street	Bidirectional	Metrobus: B24, B27, F4, F13, G12, G14, T18
Harkins Road / Annapolis Road	Bidirectional	Metrobus: B24, B27, F4, F13, G12, G14, T18
Finns Lane / Annapolis Road	Bidirectional	
Finns Lane / Fury Lane	Bidirectional	
Finns Lane / Kidmore Lane	Bidirectional	
Finns Lane / Riverdale Road	Bidirectional	
Riverdale Road / Martins Lane	Bidirectional	Metrobus: F4
Riverdale Road / Chestnut Ridge Apartments	Eastbound	Metrobus: F4
Riverdale Road / Chestridge Apartments	Westbound	Metrobus: F4
Riverdale Road / Riverdale Towne Apartments	Bidirectional	Metrobus: F4
Riverdale Road / Auburn Avenue	Eastbound	Metrobus: F4
Auburn Avenue / Riverdale Road	Bidirectional	Metrobus: T14; TheBus: 14; Shuttle-UM
Auburn Avenue / 1st Street	Bidirectional	Metrobus: T14; TheBus: 14; Shuttle-UM
Auburn Avenue / 2nd Street	Bidirectional	Metrobus: T14; TheBus: 14; Shuttle-UM
Auburn Avenue / 3rd Street	Bidirectional	Metrobus: T14; TheBus: 14; Shuttle-UM
Auburn Avenue / Chestnut Avenue	Bidirectional	Metrobus: T14; TheBus: 14; Shuttle-UM
Good Luck Road / Oakland Avenue	Bidirectional	TheBus: 14
Good Luck Road / Parkdale High School	Eastbound	TheBus: 14
Good Luck Road / Crest Park Drive	Westbound	TheBus: 14
Good Luck Road / Silk Tree Drive	Bidirectional	TheBus: 14
Good Luck Road / Sora Lane	Eastbound	TheBus: 14
Good Luck Road / Kenilworth Avenue	Bidirectional	TheBus: 14
Kenilworth Avenue / Paint Branch Parkway	Westbound	
Kenilworth Avenue / Sarvis Avenue	Bidirectional	TheBus: 14
Kenilworth Avenue / Tennyson Street	Bidirectional	TheBus: 14
River Road / Kenilworth Avenue	Bidirectional	Metrobus: R12; TheBus: 14
River Road / Haig Drive	Bidirectional	Metrobus: R12; TheBus: 14; MTA: Purple Line (at Riverdale Park North-UMD) (Planned)
River Road / Rivertech Court	Bidirectional	Metrobus: R12; TheBus: 14
River Road / American Physics Building	Bidirectional	Metrobus: R12; TheBus: 14
College Park-U of Md Bus Bay A	Bidirectional	Metrobus: 83, 86, C8, R12; RTA: 302/G; TheBus: 14, 17; Shuttle-UM: 104, 109; MTA Maryland: 204; Washington Metro: MARC: Camden Line; MTA: Purple Line (Planned)
Campus Drive / Paint Branch Trail	Bidirectional	Metrobus: 83, 86, C8; TheBus: 17; Shuttle-UM
Campus Drive / Baltimore Avenue	Eastbound	Metrobus: 83, 86 C8; TheBus: 17; Shuttle-UM
Campus Drive / Regents Drive	Bidirectional	Metrobus: C2, C8; Shuttle-UM
Stadium Drive / Regents Drive	Westbound	Metrobus: C2, C8; Shuttle-UM
Stadium Drive / Varsity Team House	Eastbound	Metrobus: C2, C8; Shuttle-UM
Stadium Drive / #4136 Yahentamitsi Hall	Westbound	Metrobus: C2, C8; Shuttle-UM
Stadium Drive / Stadium Parking Garage	Eastbound	Metrobus: C2, C8; Shuttle-UM
Stadium Drive / Hagerstown Lane	Westbound	Metrobus: C2, C8; Shuttle-UM
Stadium Drive / Smith Performing Arts Center	Eastbound	Metrobus: C2, C8; Shuttle-UM
Stadium Drive / #3854 Denton Hall	Westbound	Metrobus: C2, C8; Shuttle-UM
Adelphi Road / Tulane Drive	Bidirectional	Metrobus: F8 (Westbound only); Shuttle-UM; MTA: Purple Line (at Adelphi Road-UMGC-UMD)(Planned)
Adelphi Road / Rutgers Street	Bidirectional	Metrobus: F8; Shuttle-UM
Adelphi Road / Pennsylvania Street	Bidirectional	Metrobus: F8; Shuttle-UM
Adelphi Road / Wells Parkway	Bidirectional	Metrobus: F8; Shuttle-UM
Adelphi Road / Van Buren Street	Bidirectional	Metrobus: F8; Shuttle-UM
Belcrest Road / Adelphi Road	Bidirectional	
Belcrest Road / Toledo Terrace	Bidirectional	
Belcrest Road / Toledo Road	Bidirectional	Metrobus: C4, F6, F8, R4; TheBus (Eastbound only): 13, 14; Shuttle-UM (Eastbound only)
Belcrest Road / #6505	Eastbound	Metrobus: C4, F6, F8, R4; TheBus: 13, 14; Shuttle-UM
Belcrest Road / Freedom Way	Westbound	Metrobus: C4, F8, R4; TheBus: 13, 14; Shuttle-UM
Hyattsville Crossing Bus Bays C and H	Bidirectional	Metrobus: 86, C4, F4, F8, R4; TheBus: 13, 14, 18; Shuttle-UM: 113; Washington Metro:
Belcrest Road / Queens Chapel Road	Bidirectional	Metrobus: 86, F4, F8, R4; TheBus: 18
Queens Chapel Road / Oliver Street	Bidirectional	Metrobus: F8, R4; TheBus: 18
Queens Chapel Road / Nicholson Street	Bidirectional	Metrobus: F8, R4; TheBus: 18
Queens Chapel Road / Sacred Heart Home	Bidirectional	Metrobus: F8, R4; TheBus: 18
Queens Chapel Road / Lancer Drive	Bidirectional	Metrobus: F8, R4; TheBus: 18
Queens Chapel Road / Jefferson Street	Eastbound	Metrobus: F8, R4
Queens Chapel Road / Hamilton Manor Drive	Westbound	Metrobus: F8, R4
Hamilton Street / 31st Avenue	Bidirectional	Metrobus: F8, R4; TheBus: 12, 13
West Hyattsville Bus Bay D	Bidirectional	Metrobus: F1, F8, R4; TheBus: 12, 13; Washington Metro:
West Hyattsville Bus Bay F	Bidirectional	Metrobus: F1, F8, R4; TheBus: 12, 13; Washington Metro:
Ager Road / Lancer Drive	Bidirectional	TheBus: 13
Ager Road / Kirkwood Place	Eastbound	TheBus: 13
Ager Road / 29th Avenue	Westbound	TheBus: 13
Ager Road / Nicholson Street	Bidirectional	TheBus: 13
Ager Road / Oglethorpe Street	Bidirectional	TheBus: 13
Ager Road / Powhatan Road	Bidirectional	TheBus: 13
Ager Road / Rittenhouse Street	Eastbound	TheBus: 13
Ager Road / Sheridan Street	Bidirectional	
East-West Highway / 19th Place	Eastbound	Metrobus: C4, R2
Riggs Road / East-West Highway	Bidirectional	Metrobus: R1, R2
Riggs Road / Dayton Road	Bidirectional	Metrobus: R1, R2
Sargent Road / Riggs Road	Eastbound	
Sargent Road / Anna Court	Westbound	
Sargent Road / Balfour Drive	Bidirectional	
Sargent Road / Ray Road	Bidirectional	
Sargent Road / Nicholson Street	Westbound	TheBus: 12
Sargent Road / Ray Road	Bidirectional	
Sargent Road / Madison Street	Bidirectional	
Sargent Road / Chillum Road	Bidirectional	Metrobus: F1
Sargent Road / Eastern Avenue	Bidirectional	
Northeast Washington, D.C.
Sargent Road NE / Gallatin Street NE	Eastbound	Metrobus: E2
Gallatin Street NE / Sargent Road NE	Westbound	Metrobus: E2
Gallatin Street NE / 10th Street NE	Eastbound	Metrobus: E2
Gallatin Street NE / 8th Street NE	Westbound	Metrobus: E2
Gallatin Street NE / South Dakota Avenue NE	Bidirectional	Metrobus: 80, E2
Galloway Street NE / South Dakota Avenue NE	Bidirectional	Metrobus: 80, E2
Galloway Street NE / 4th Street NE	Eastbound	Metrobus: 80 (Southbound only), E2 (Southbound only), E4 (Eastbound only)
Fort Totten Bus Bay H	Eastbound station, Westbound terminal	Metrobus: 60, 64, 80, E2, E4, K2, K6, K9, R1, R2; Washington Metro:

== History ==
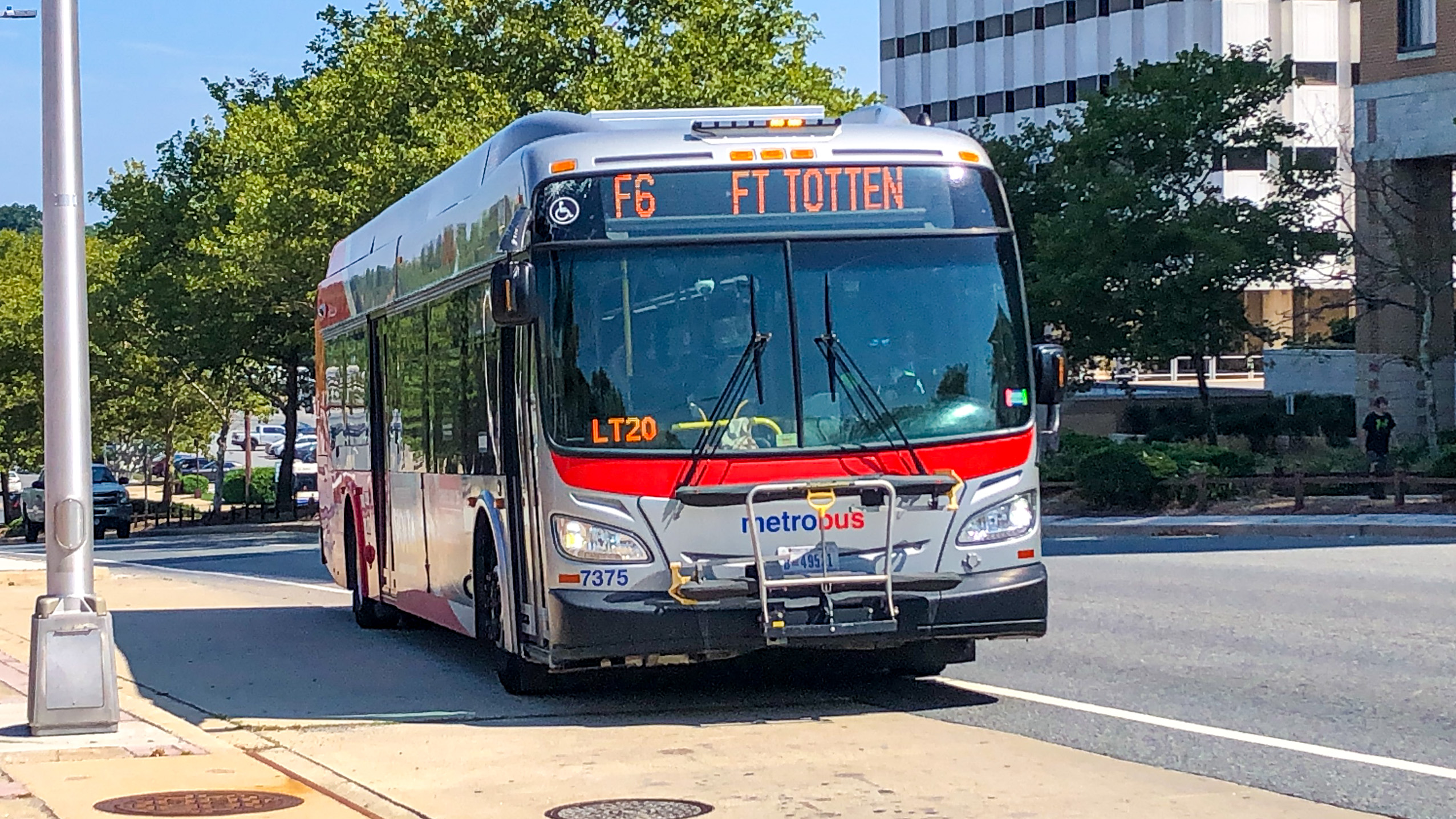
Former Route F6 at The Mall at Prince Georges in 2019

Route F6 had a prior incarnation operating as part of the former Capital Transit Company's Sargent Road Line between 12th & Quincy Street NE in Brookland, D.C. and Green Meadows, MD (some trips; however, would be shortened to operate only up to Gallatin Street NE & South Dakota Avenue NE in North Michigan Park, D.C.). F6 later on became a DC Transit Route during the 1950s and ended up being discontinued in the late 1960s and being replaced by Metrobus Routes F5 and F7.

Route F4 had a prior incarnation operating as part of the former Capital Transit Company Michigan Avenue Line between Eastern Avenue NE & Michigan Avenue NE (Avondale) and 9th Street NW & Constitution Avenue NW (Archives). Just like the F6, the F4 eventually became a DC Transit Route during the 1950s, before ultimately becoming a WMATA Metrobus Route on February 4, 1973, when the Metrobus System was formed.

The Prince George's–Silver Spring Line was created as a brand new line on February 19, 1978, shortly after Silver Spring station opened, to replace the former segment of the J2 and J4's routing between Silver Spring and Beltway Plaza Mall, that were discontinued when the J2 and J4 were truncated to only operate up to the Silver Spring station.

The East-West Highway Line was originally operated by Routes J2 and J4, originally operating between Montgomery Mall and Beltway Plaza (J2), and between Chevy Chase Circle and Beltway Plaza (J4).

On February 19, 1978 shortly after Silver Spring opened, Routes J2 and J4 were truncated to only operate between Friendship Heights (J4)/Montgomery Mall (J2) and Silver Spring station. The East-West Highway Line was split into two routes. Routes J2, J4, and a brand new J3 were renamed into the Bethesda–Silver Spring Line operating on its current route between Friendship Heights and Montgomery Mall and Silver Spring, while the portion between Silver Spring and Prince George's Plaza was renamed into the Prince George's-Silver Spring Line, operated by new Routes F4 and F6.

Routes F4 and F6 operated between Silver Spring and New Carrollton (F4) and Greenbelt (F6). Both routes operated parallel with each other between Silver Spring and East-West Highway & Ager Road in Green Meadows, then split from each other. Route F4 would operate along the former J2's routing along East-West Highway, then would operate to New Carrollton Mall via Belcrest Road, Queensbury Road, 48th Avenue (towards New Carrollton)/Lafayette Avenue (towards the Silver Spring Metro Station), and Riverdale Road. Route F6 would operate along the former J4's routing Ager Road, Hamilton Street, Queens Chapel Road, Belcrest Road, University of Maryland, Baltimore Avenue, Greenbelt Road, and Beltway Plaza. After serving Beltway Plaza, Route F6 would operate to Greenbelt Center via Greenbelt Road, Lakecrest Drive, Lakeside Drive, Westway, Ridge Road, Gardenway, Crescent Road, and Southway. During rush hours, the F6 would operate to Goddard Space Flight Center via Southway and Greenbelt Road.

On December 11, 1993, the F6 was rerouted to operate between New Carrollton and Prince George's Plaza station, via Ellin Road, Harkins Road, Finns Lane, Riverdale Road, Auburn Avenue, Good Luck Road, Kenilworth Avenue, River Road, College Park–University of Maryland station, River Road, Kenilworth Avenue, East-West Highway, Prince George's Plaza, Belcrest Road, Queens Chapel Road, Ager Road, West Hyattsville station, Ager Road, and East-West Highway. Service to Beltway Plaza and Greenbelt Center was replaced by extended route C2.

Around the 1990s, Route F6 would discontinue service to Silver Spring station and terminate at Prince George's Plaza.

Around 1996, after Paint Branch Parkway was finished being completed route F6 was rerouted to operate between the Prince George's Plaza and College Park station, via its original routing via Belcrest Road, Adelphi Road, and Campus Drive, then via Paint Branch Parkway and River Road. Once this change took place, F6's routing on Kenilworth Avenue between River Road and Prince George's Plaza was discontinued.

On September 12, 1999, route F6 was re-extended to Silver Spring station via West Hyattsville station. The route operated along Queens Chapel Road, Hamilton Street and Ager Road to serve West Hyattsville, then follow route F4's routing to Silver Spring along East-West Highway, Ethan Allen Avenue, and Philadelphia Avenue.

On May 15, 2003, the former Metrobus bus bays in front of the former G.C. Murphy store inside Prince George's Plaza, were demolished to build a new Target store. Routes F4 and F6 stopped directing entering into and looping inside the Prince George's Plaza.

On September 28, 2008, due to the Silver Spring station Bus Bay and Kiss & Ride Lot were closed off due to the construction of the brand new Silver Spring Transit Center, routes F4 and F6 Metrobus Stop at Silver Spring was temporarily relocated from Bay N to the jughandle at the intersection of Wayne Avenue and Colesville Road, across Silver Spring station.

In 2010, WMATA proposed to split the F4 and F6 routing into two routes. While the F4 remained the same, the F6 was proposed to be rerouted to serve Fort Totten, keeping its routing between the New Carrollton station & intersection of East-West Highway & Riggs Road the same, except route F6 would be rerouted to operate on the Route R3 routing between the intersection of Riggs Road & East-West Highway & Fort Totten along East-West Highway, Riggs Road, Sargent Road. This was proposed to reduce redundancy with F4 between Silver Spring station and the East West Highway and Riggs Road intersection. The proposal was brought up again in 2012 with the same similarities.

On June 17, 2012, the F6 was rerouted to operate between the New Carrollton and Fort Totten stations, instead of operating between the New Carrollton and Silver Spring stations. While the segment of F6's routing between New Carrollton and the intersection of East-West Highway and Riggs Road would remain the same, route F6 was rerouted to replace the segment of the R3 routing between the intersection of East–West Highway and Riggs Road and Fort Totten station, by turning onto Riggs Road, and then operating via Sargent Road/Sargent Road NE, Gallatin Street NE, South Dakota Avenue NE, and Galloway Street NE. Route F4 added extra trips to supplement route F6 riders between Silver Spring and Riggs Road. Route F6 would be renamed to the New Carrollton–Fort Totten Line as a result of the changes.

Beginning on September 1, 2019, for nine months, the College Park Metrobus loop was temporarily closed for construction of the Purple line at College Park station having all stops located along River Road. As a result, route F6's bus stops were moved onto River Road to serve the station. There were no detours that affected route F6.

All route F6 service was suspended due to WMATA's response to the COVID-19 pandemic beginning on March 16, 2020. Route F6 was fully restored on August 23, 2020, operating every 60 minutes.

On September 26, 2020, WMATA proposed to reduce the frequency of buses to every 60 minutes on the F6 due to low federal funding. Later in February 2021 during WMATA's FY2022 Budget crisis, WMATA proposed to eliminate all Route F6 service beginning in January 2022. Subsequently on April 22, 2021, WMATA approved the FY2022 budget and received federal funding to avoid service cuts.

On June 10, 2021, WMATA proposed to restore Route F6's pre-pandemic service as part of WMATA's Pandemic Recovery Plan. Full service on the F6 was restored on September 5, 2021.

Due to rising cases of the COVID-19 Omicron variant, all service was suspended beginning on January 10, 2022. Route F6 resumed service on February 7, 2022.

=== Better Bus Redesign ===
In 2022, WMATA launched its Better Bus Redesign project, which aimed to redesign the entire Metrobus Network and is the first full redesign of the agency's bus network in its history.

In April 2023, WMATA launched its Draft Visionary Network. As part of the drafts, WMATA proposed to split the F6 into two routes. The F6 portion between New Carrollton station and College Park–University of Maryland station remained the same and was named Route MD254. The F6 portion between College Park and Fort Totten station mostly remained the same, but was modified to no longer operate along Queens Chapel Road, Ager Road, and West Hyattsville station, instead operating along East-West Highway, 23rd Street, and Ager Road. The line was named Route MD245.

During WMATA's Revised Draft Visionary Network, WMATA revised the MD245 and renamed it to Route P32, which was modified from its original plan. Service between College Park and the intersection of East-West Highway & 23rd Avenue mostly remained the same (with the exception of the route now operating along Toledo Road), but the route then turned onto 23rd Avenue and Ager Road to serve West Hyattsville station, then would operate on Queens Chapel Road and Chillum Road before turning onto Sargent Road. There the proposed P32 would serve Riggs Park via Eastern Avenue, Chillum Place NE (to Fort Totten), Nicholson Street NE (to College Park), Riggs Road NE, 1st Place NE (to Fort Totten), and South Dakota Avenue NE (to College Park) to replace the current E4 between Fort Totten station and Riggs Park.

The proposed Route MD254 was partially merged with the proposed MD247 route (between Takoma Langley Crossroads Transit Center and New Carrollton station) and renamed into the P31. The P31 would operate on the former F6 portion between New Carrollton station and the intersection of Riverdale Road & Auburn Avenue via Finns Lane, but would remain straight along Riverdale Road before turning onto Kenilworth Avenue. Then the P31 would operate via Kenilworth Avenue, River Road, College Park station, Campus Drive, Stadium Drive, and University Boulevard before terminating at Takoma Langley Crossroads Transit Center.

Later a new proposed Route P35 would join the P31, which operates between New Carrollton station and Fort Totten station via the current F6 routing between New Carrollton station and the intersection of Kenilworth Avenue & River Road, but then would continue straight along Kenilworth Avenue and turn onto Riverdale Road. The route then operates along the current F4 routing from the intersection of Riverdale Road & Kenilworth Avenue to the intersection of East-West Highway & Riggs Road via Queensbury Road, Hyattsville Crossing station, and East-West Highway before operating on the current F6 routing to Fort Totten station via Riggs Road, Sargent Road, Gallatin Street NE, and Galloway Street NE. Originally service was going to be daily before removing weekend service from later proposals.

All changes were then proposed during WMATA's 2025 Proposed Network.

During the proposed changes, Route P32 was modified to operate to Greenbelt station via Baltimore Avenue, Greenbelt Road, and Cherrywood Lane to replace the proposed P1X, which was proposed to be rerouted to IKEA Way in College Park. Service inside Riggs Park was also removed with the proposed Route C71 instead serving Riggs Park.

On November 21, 2024, WMATA approved its Better Bus Redesign Network, with service on the New Carrollton–Fort Totten Line being simplified.

Beginning on June 29, 2025, Route F6 was replaced by Routes P31, P32, and P35.

Route P31 operated daily on the same F6 routing between New Carrollton and the intersection of Riverdale Road and Auburn Avenue, then would remain straight on Riverdale Road and operate until turns onto Kenilworth Avenue, before turning onto River Road, resuming the former F6 routing to University of Maryland via College Park–University of Maryland station It would then operate to Takoma Langley Crossroads Transit Center via University Boulevard, replacing the C2 and F8.

Route P32 also operated daily and was combined with the C2 and mimics the pre-1993 routing of the F6, operating between Greenbelt station and Fort Totten station along the former C2 routing between Greenbelt and University of Maryland, then operating on the former F8 routing between the intersection of Campus Drive & Adelphi Road and Hyattsville Crossing station, then operate on former TheBus Routes 13 and 19 between Hyattsville Crossing and West Hyattsville station, then the former Route F1 service between West Hyattsville and Sargent Road, and the former F6 service between Sargent Road and Fort Totten station.

Route P35 only operated during the weekdays and operated between New Carrollton and Fort Totten stations. The route follows the F6 routing between New Carrollton and the intersection of Kenilworth Avenue & River Road, however the route would remain straight and turn onto Riverdale Road and follow the former Route F4 routing to the intersection of East-West Highway & Riggs Road via Riverdale Park and Hyattsville Crossing station. The route then follows the former F6 routing between Riggs Road and Fort Totten station.
