= University Boulevard Line =

Daily bus route in Washington, D.C. area

M12
- University Boulevard Line

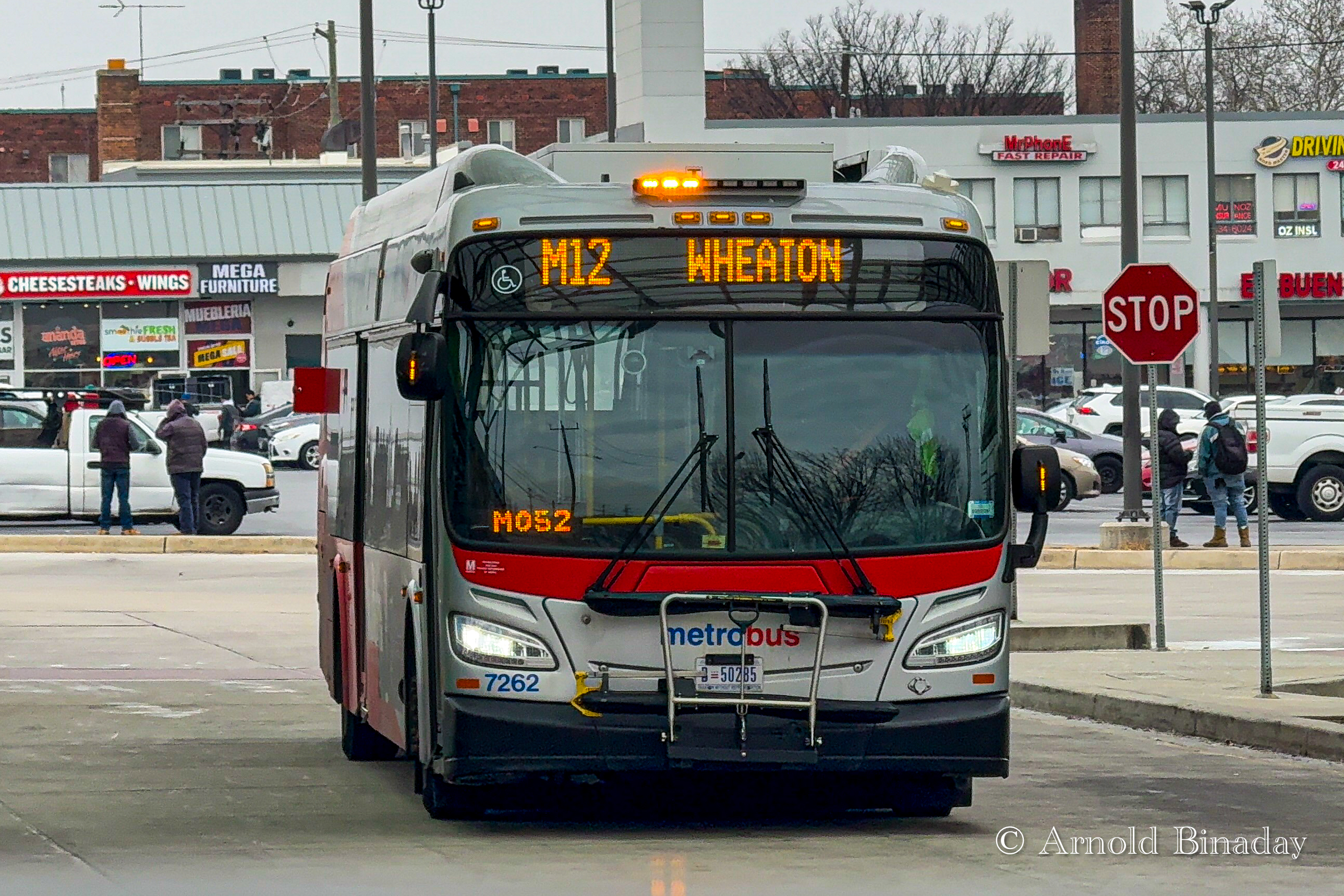
- Route M12 at Takoma Langley Crossroads Transit Center

Overview
- System: Metrobus
- Operator: Washington Metropolitan Area Transit Authority
- Garage: Montgomery
- Livery: Local
- Status: In Service
- Began service: C2: 1973; C4: 1990; M12: June 29, 2025
- Ended service: C2 & C4: June 28, 2025

Route
- Locale: Prince George's County, Montgomery County
- Communities served: Twinbrook, Rockville, Wheaton, Silver Spring, Takoma Park, Four Corners, Langley Park, Lewisdale, Hyattsville
- Landmarks served: Hyattsville Crossing station, The Mall at Prince George's, Takoma Langley Crossroads Transit Center, Montgomery Blair High School, Four Corners, Northwood High School, Wheaton station, Westfield Wheaton, Twinbrook station
- Start: Hyattsville Crossing station
- Via: East-West Highway, Riggs Road, University Boulevard, Veirs Mill Road, Randolph Road
- End: Twinbrook station

Service
- Level: Daily
- Frequency: 6-30 minutes (varies based on time of day)
- Operates: 4:00 AM - 2:00 AM (Monday - Friday); 5:00 AM - 2:00 AM (Saturday - Sunday)
- Ridership: 1,442,559 (C2, FY 2025); 2,186,885 (C4, FY 2025)
- Transfers: SmarTrip, Contactless Bank Cards
- Timetable: University Boulevard Line

The University Boulevard Line, designated Route M12, is a daily bus route operated by the Washington Metropolitan Area Transit Authority between Hyattsville Crossing station of the Green and Yellow Lines and Twinbrook station of the Red Line of the Washington Metro. The line operates every 6 – 24 minutes during peak hours, every 12-24 minutes during weekday off-peak and weekend daytime, and every 20-30 minutes during late night. Trips take roughly 70 minutes. Every other trip on the M12 operates between Takoma Langley Crossroads Transit Center and Wheaton station of the Red Line of the Washington Metro which takes roughly 30 minutes. The line connects northern Prince George's County to Montgomery County via the University Boulevard East/West (MD 193) corridor.

== Background ==
Route M12 mostly provides service along University Boulevard operating between Montgomery County and Prince George's County via Takoma Park connecting riders between the two. The route operates out of Montgomery division.

=== Stops ===
Bus stop	Direction	Connections
Montgomery County, Maryland
Twinbrook station Bus Bay A	Westbound terminal, Eastbound station	Ride On: 5, 26, 44, 45, 46; Washington Metro:
Parklawn Drive / Wicomico Avenue	Eastbound	Ride On: 26, 44, 45
Parklawn Drive / Twinbrook Parkway	Westbound	Ride On: 26, 44, 45
Parklawn Drive / FDA	Bidirectional	
Parklawn Drive / Wilkins Avenue	Bidirectional	
Parklawn Drive / Wilkins Avenue	Bidirectional	
Parklawn Drive / Braxfield Court	Bidirectional	
Randolph Road / Putnam Road	Eastbound	Metrobus: M42, M44
Randolph Road / Lauderdale Drive	Westbound	Metrobus: M42, M44
Randolph Road / Hunters Lane	Bidirectional	Metrobus: M42, M44
Randolph Road / Rockinghorse Road	Eastbound	Metrobus: M42, M44
Randolph Road / Gaynor Drive	Westbound	Metrobus: M42, M44
Randolph Road / Dewey Road	Bidirectional	Metrobus: M42, M44
Randolph Road / Charles Road	Bidirectional	Metrobus: M42, M44
Randolph Road / Bennion Road	Eastbound	Metrobus: M42, M44
Randolph Road / Selfridge Drive	Westbound	Metrobus: M42, M44
Veirs Mill Road / Bushey Drive	Bidirectional	Ride On: 40, 48
Veirs Mill Road / Ferrara Avenue	Bidirectional	Ride On: 38, 40, 48
Veirs Mill Road / Connecticut Avenue	Bidirectional	Ride On: 38, 40, 41, 48
Veirs Mill Road / Andrew Street	Westbound	Ride On: 38, 40, 48
Veirs Mill Road / Centerhill Street	Eastbound	Ride On: 38, 40, 48
Veirs Mill Road / Gail Street	Eastbound	Ride On: 38, 40, 48
Veirs Mill Road / Claridge Road	Bidirectional	Ride On: 33, 38, 40, 48
Veirs Mill Road / Pendleton Drive	Bidirectional	Ride On: 33, 38, 40, 48
Veirs Mill Road / Newport Mill Road	Bidirectional	Ride On: 33, 38, 40, 48
Veirs Mill Road / Norris Drive	Bidirectional	Ride On: 33, 38, 40, 48
Veirs Mill Road / College View Drive	Eastbound	Ride On: 38, 40, 48
Veirs Mill Road / Galt Avenue	Westboound	Ride On: 38, 40, 48
Veirs Mill Road / University Boulevard	Bidirectional	Ride On: 34, 38, 40, 48
Wheaton station Bus Bays B & D	Bidirectional	Ride On: 4, 7, 8, 9, 31, 34, 37, 38, 40, 41, 48; Metrobus: M20, M22; Washington Metro:
Veirs Mill Road / University Boulevard	Bidirectional	Metrobus: M20, M22; Ride On: 8, 9, 34, 38, 40, 48
Reedie Drive / Fern Street	Westbound	Ride On: 7, 8, 9, 31
University Boulevard / Fern Street	Eastbound	Ride On: 7, 8
Amherst Avenue / University Boulevard	Westbound	Ride On: 7, 8, 9, 31
University Boulevard / Westchester Drive	Bidirectional	Ride On: 7, 8
University Boulevard / Reedie Drive	Bidirectional	Ride On: 7, 8
University Boulevard / Eastcrest Drive	Bidirectional	Ride On: 7, 8
University Boulevard / Inwood Avenue	Bidirectional	Ride On: 7, 8
University Boulevard / Sligo Creek Parkway	Bidirectional	Ride On: 8
University Boulevard / Warwick Towers	Westbound	Ride On: 8
University Boulevard / Gabel Street	Eastbound	Ride On: 8, 9
University Boulevard / Northwood High School	Westbound	Ride On: 8, 9
University Boulevard / Orange Drive	Eastbound	Ride On: 9
University Boulevard / Eisner Street	Westbound	Ride On: 9
University Boulevard / Dennis Avenue	Bidirectional	Ride On: 9, 19 (Westbound only)
University Boulevard / Royalton Road	Bidirectional	Ride On: 9, 19
University Boulevard / Burnett Avenue	Bidirectional	Ride On: 9, 19
University Boulevard / Sutherland Road	Westbound	Metrobus: M52, M54; Ride On: 9, 19, 21, 22, Flash BRT (Blue, Orange)
University Boulevard / Colesville Road	Bidirectional	Metrobus: M52, M54; Ride On: 9, 19, 21, 22, Flash BRT (Blue, Orange)
University Boulevard / Lexington Drive	Bidirectional	Ride On: 19
University Boulevard / Williamsburg Drive	Bidirectional	Ride On: 19
University Boulevard / East Franklin Drive	Bidirectional	Ride On: 14
University Boulevard / East Melbourne Drive	Bidirectional	Ride On: 14
University Boulevard / East Wayne Avenue	Eastbound	Ride On: 14
University Boulevard / Buckingham Drive	Westbound	Ride On: 14
University Boulevard / Langley Drive	Eastbound	Ride On: 14
University Boulevard / Patton Drive	Westbound	Ride On: 14
University Boulevard / Piney Branch Road	Bidirectional	Ride On: 15, 16, 20, 24; MTA: Purple Line (at Piney Branch Road station) (Planned)
University Boulevard / Seek Lane	Bidirectional	Ride On: 15
University Boulevard / Forston Street	Eastbound	Ride On: 15
University Boulevard / Carroll Avenue	Westbound	Ride On: 15
University Boulevard / Merrimac Drive	Eastbound	Ride On: 15
University Boulevard / Navahoe Drive	Westbound	Ride On: 15
Prince George's County, Maryland
Takoma Langley Crossroads Transit Center Bus Bays A & D	Bidirectional	Metrobus: M60, M6X, P31; Ride On: 15, 16, 17, 18, 25; TheBus: P43; Shuttle-UM: 129; MTA: Purple Line (Planned)
University Boulevard / 14th Avenue	Bidirectional	Metrobus: P31; TheBus: P43
University Boulevard / 15th Avenue	Bidirectional	Metrobus: P15, P16, P31; TheBus: P43; MTA: Purple Line (at Riggs Road station) (Planned)
Riggs Road / University Boulevard	Eastbound	Metrobus: P15, P16, P31; TheBus: P43; MTA: Purple Line (at Riggs Road station) (Planned)
Riggs Road / Drexel Street	Bidirectional	
Riggs Road / Drexel Street	Bidirectional	
Riggs Road / Riggs Road Court	Eastbound	
Riggs Road / Beechwood Drive	Westbound	
Riggs Road / Avalon Place	Eastbound	
Riggs Road / Amherst Road	Westbound	
East-West Highway / 19th Place	Bidirectional	Metrobus: P15, P16, P30, P35
East-West Highway / Ager Road	Bidirectional	Metrobus: P15, P16, P30, P35
East-West Highway / 23rd Avenue	Bidirectional	Metrobus: P15, P16, P30, P35; TheBus: P43
Toledo Terrace / East-West Highway	Bidirectional	Metrobus: P30, P32, P35; TheBus: P43
Toledo Terrace / Toledo Place	Bidirectional	
Toledo Terrace / The Seville	Bidirectional	Metrobus: P33
Toledo Terrace / Belcrest Road	Bidirectional	Metrobus: P33
Belcrest Road / Toledo Road	Bidirectional	Metrobus: P32, P33; Shuttle-UM: 113
Belcrest Road / Freedom Way	Eastbound	Metrobus: M44, P10, P32, P33; Shuttle-UM: 113
Belcrest Road / #6505	Westbound	Metrobus: M44, P10, P32, P33; Shuttle-UM: 113
Belcrest Road / East-West Highway	Eastbound	Metrobus: M44, P10, P32, P33; Shuttle-UM: 113
Hyattsville Crossing station Bus Bay A	Westbound station, Eastbound terminal	Metrobus: M44, P10, P30, P32, P33, P35; TheBus: P43; Shuttle-UM: 113; Washington Metro:

== History ==
=== 20th century ===
C2 was created as a new route on February 4, 1973, to replace the segment of the former J8 streetcar line between Wheaton Plaza & Montgomery Mall when the J8 became a Metrobus Route and was truncated to only operate between the Wheaton Plaza & Beltway Plaza. Routes C2 & J8 operated as part of the "Beltway Plaza–Montgomery Mall Line" until February 19, 1978. when they were both merged into route C2. Route C2 operated between Montgomery Mall & Beltway Plaza, via Prince George's Plaza Mall & University of Maryland, College Park.

Route C4 was originally designated as the Randolph Road Line. It operated between White Oak and Montgomery College until September 6, 1981, when it was replaced by extended Metrobus route Z4.

On January 27, 1985, route C2 was rerouted to terminate at the newly opened Twinbrook station, discontinuing service to Montgomery Mall. The portion of the route between Wheaton station and Montgomery Mall would be replaced by Ride On route 35. As a result of this change, the line would be renamed the "Beltway Plaza-Twinbrook Line".

On September 22, 1990, route C2 was truncated to only operate up to Wheaton station. The C4 would begin revenue service at the same time, operating between Langley Park and Twinbrook station. Route C2 would now only operate between Wheaton station and Beltway Plaza.

On December 11, 1993, route C2 was extended from Beltway Plaza Mall to Greenbelt Center via Greenbelt station when the Green Line northern portion was opened replacing route F6 service between University Of Maryland and Beltway Plaza which was rerouted to serve New Carrollton station along with route F4. But Route C2 will discontinue service via Prince Georges Plaza, and would operate through the University Of Maryland operating on a direct route along Campus Drive.

Route C4 was extended from Langley Park to Prince George's Plaza (now Hyattsville Crossing) station, along route C2's original routing from intersection of University Boulevard East in Langley Park & the Prince George's Plaza Mall, via Riggs Road, and East West Highway. The line was renamed as the "Greenbelt-Twinbrook Line" as result of these changes.

=== 21st century ===
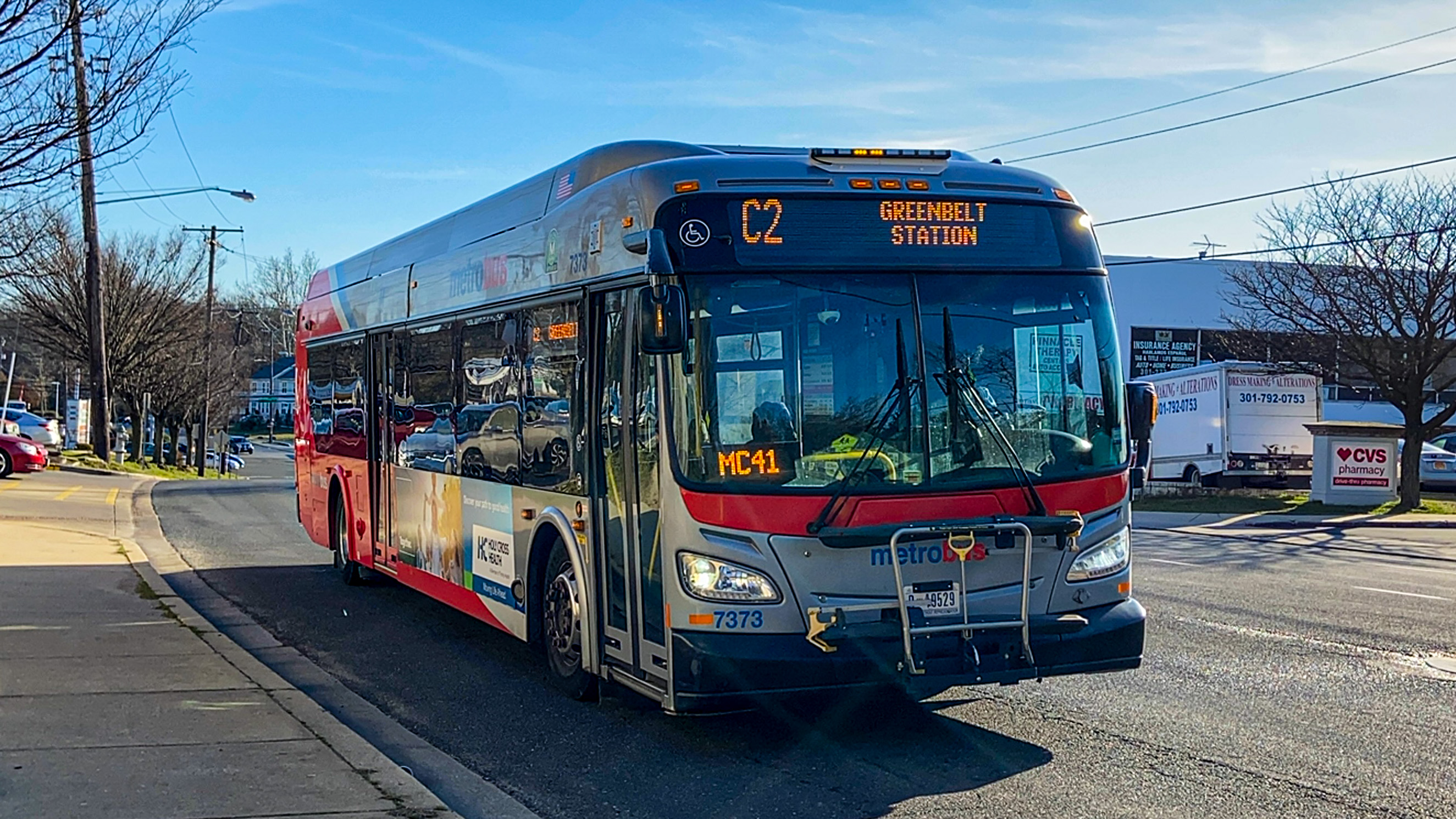
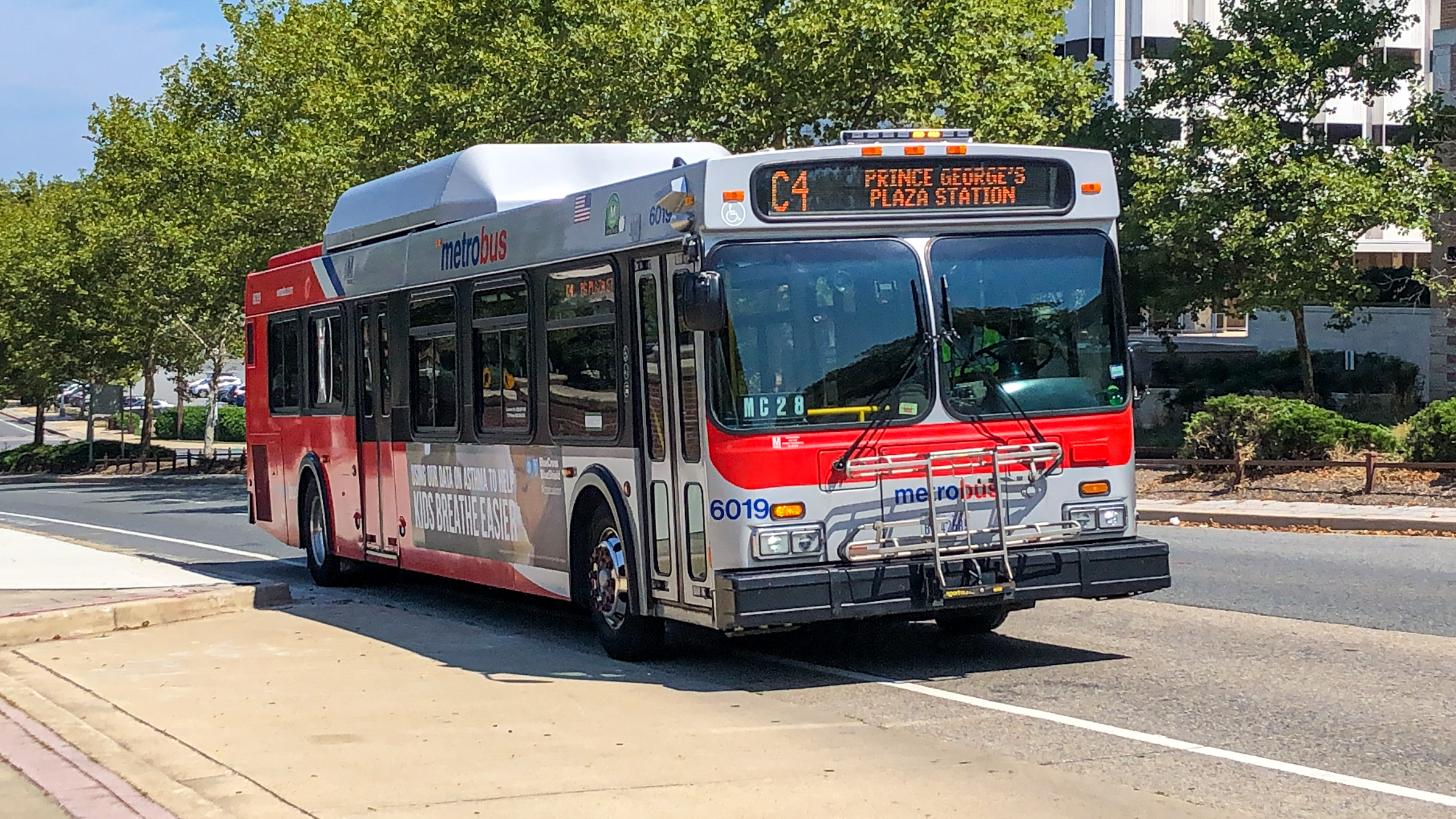
Former Routes C2 and C4

On January 13, 2001, route C4 was rerouted along Toledo Terrace and Belcrest Road to serve the apartment complexes behind The Mall at Prince Georges. The line would serve the mall bus bays from Belcrest Road.

On May 15, 2003, the original bus bays inside Prince Georges Plaza mall, were demolished in order to build a new Target store. Routes C4 along with routes 86, F4, F6, F8, R2, R3, R4 and TheBus 13, 14, 18 have stopped entering and looping inside around the mall.

In 2010, WMATA proposed to completely discontinue the C4 and to replace it with the C8 and J5. Under the proposal, the J5 would discontinue service along the Capital Beltway and Grosvenor–Strathmore station and will serve the former C4 stops via Parklawn Drive, Randolph Road, Veirs Mill Road, Wheaton Station, and Georgia Avenue. Service to Prince George's Plaza station would be provided by the C8 which was proposed to discontinue service to College Park–University of Maryland station and University of Maryland. However a major problem in the proposal was the C8 was proposed to only operate on Weekday Peak Hour services only while the J5 only operated during Peak Hours. With the discontinuation of the C4 and the changes made on the C8 and J5, it would not only lose direct service from Prince George's Plaza to Twinbrook, it would also mean residents would have a lack of bus service where the C4 operated since the C8 and J5 would only operate during rush hours only.

Route C2 was also proposed to be shorten to Greenbelt station discontinuing service to Greenbelt Center being replaced by a new route T12, T14, and existing T16 or routes G12, G14, and G16 eliminating service between Greenbelt station and Greenbelt Center. This was a result of Greenbelt bus service lacking much service and the city of Greenbelt wanting to restructure the lines.

On December 19, 2010, route C2 was truncated from the Greenbelt Center to only operate up to Greenbelt station at the request of the city of Greenbelt. Service between Greenbelt station and Greenbelt Center being replaced by new routes G13, G14, and G16, in order to simplify Greenbelt bus service as much as possible with other routes and as a method of circumventing the transportation budget shortfall in Prince George's County. Route C2 also discontinue the Beltway Plaza Loop as well being replaced by routes G14 and G16.

In 2015, WMATA proposed to split the C2 and C4 into two separate routes. Route C2 would operate between Greenbelt station and the upcoming Takoma Langley Crossroads Transit Center while route C4 would keep its current routing but have every other trip end at Wheaton station. Sunday service would also be added to route C2 in order to replace route 81 which was proposed to be eliminated. The changes were due to the demand for bus service is the lowest on the section of the line between Langley Park and Greenbelt station and it would be easier to manage service on University Boulevard with only one route instead of having overlapping service.

On March 27, 2016, new Sunday Service was added to the C2 operating between Greenbelt station and Langley Park only replacing route 81 service.

When the Takoma Langley Crossroads Transit Center opened on December 22, 2016, the C2 and C4 were rerouted, along with several other Metrobus, Ride On buses, Shuttle UM and TheBus routes, to serve the newly opened Transit Center. Routes C2 and C4 would serve Bus Bay A (Westbound) and Bus Bay D (Eastbound).

On December 17, 2017, Eastbound buses that departed Wheaton station were rerouted operate via Veirs Mill Road to access University Boulevard due to the closure of Reedie Drive. Eastbound service on Reedie Drive and Amherst Avenue will be eliminated.

During the COVID-19 pandemic, routes C2 and C4 began operating on its Saturday supplemental schedule beginning on March 16, 2020. However beginning on March 18, 2020, the route was further reduced to operate on its Sunday schedule during the weekdays with route C2 operating between Takoma Langley Crossroads and Greenbelt only having no service to Wheaton. Also beginning on March 21, 2020, route C2 was suspended on the weekends while route C4 operated every 30 minutes on its full route. The line resumed its pre-pandemic service beginning on August 23, 2020.

In February 2021 during WMATA's FY2022 Budget crisis, WMATA proposed to add late-night service to 2:00 AM on Route C4 beginning in July 2021, but would reduce it back to midnight beginning in January 2022. Additionally, all Route C2 service would be discontinued and replaced by a rerouted Route 83 from Cherry Hill Campground to Greenbelt station. Subsequently on April 22, 2021, WMATA approved the FY2022 budget and received federal funding to avoid service cuts.

On June 6, 2021, late-night service was increased to operate up to 2:00 AM on Route C4.

On June 10, 2021, WMATA proposed to increase the C2 and C4 to operate every 12 minutes daily between 7:00 AM to 9:00 PM daily as part of WMATA's Pandemic Recovery Plan. On September 5, 2021, the line was increased to operate every 12 minutes between both routes between 7:00 am and 9:00 pm daily.

Due to rising cases of the COVID-19 Omicron variant, the line was reduced to its Saturday service on weekdays beginning on January 10, 2022. Full weekday service and all Route 31 service resumed on February 7, 2022.

In 2024 during WMATA's FY2024 Budget crisis, WMATA proposed to eliminate all C4 service after midnight daily. However on April 25, 2024, Metro’s Board of Directors approved a $4.8 billion capital and operating budget which avoided service cuts.

=== Better Bus Redesign ===
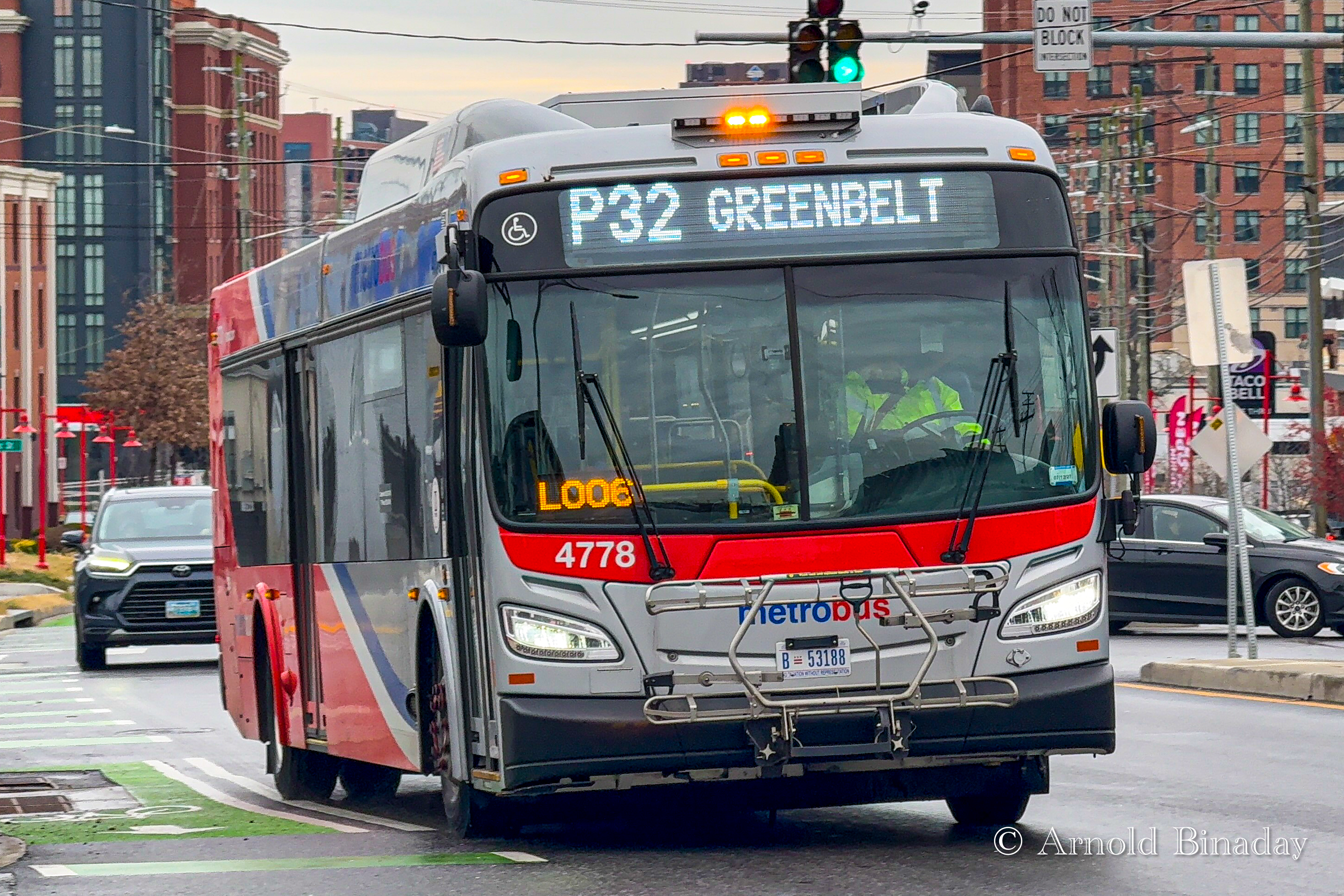
Route P32 took over parts of the former Route C2 as the Greenbelt–Fort Totten Line.

In 2022, WMATA launched its Better Bus Redesign project, which aimed to redesign the entire Metrobus Network and is the first full redesign of the agency's bus network in its history.

In April 2023, WMATA launched its Draft Visionary Network. As part of the drafts, WMATA proposed to split the C2 and C4 into two separate routes.

The C2 portion between Greenbelt station and Takoma Langley Crossroads Transit Center was broken up into three different routes. The portion between Greenbelt station and the beginning of University Boulevard East was named Route MD246 and was extended to West Hyattsville station via Meterzott Road, New Hampshire Avenue, University Boulevard, 23rd Avenue, and Ager Road, partially reincorporating the former Route R3. The portion between the University of Maryland and Takoma Langley Crossroads Transit Center was named Route MD247 and was routed to serve New Carrollton station via Baltimore Avenue, Queensbury Road, Riverdale Road, and Veterans Parkway. The portion between Greenbelt station and the University of Maryland (the intersection of Baltimore Avenue and Campus Drive) was combined with the 83 and 86 and was named Route MD249, operating between Rhode Island Avenue station and Greenbelt station via Baltimore Avenue.

The C4 was to operate on its current routing between Hyattsville Crossing station and the intersection of Randolph Road and Parklawn Drive, but was rerouted to serve North Bethesda station instead of Twinbrook station via Parklawn Drive and Nicholson Lane and was named Route MD143. During the late nights when Metrorail is closed, Route MD143 would be extended to New Carrollton station via East-West Highway and Riverdale Road.

During WMATA's Revised Draft Visionary Network, WMATA renamed the MD246 to the P36, the MD247 to the P31, the MD249 to the P1X, and the MD143 to the M12, keeping their same routings. The nighttime extension to New Carrollton station for the proposed Route MD143 was not included in the proposal.

By the time the Proposed 2025 Network was released, WMATA dropped the P36 entirely and modified the P31 route. The new P31 still operated between Takoma Langley and New Carrollton, but no longer operated along Baltimore Avenue, Queensbury Road, or Veterans Parkway and instead would continue along Campus Drive to serve College Park–University of Maryland station, then operate along Campus Drive, Kenilworth Avenue, Riverdale Road, Finns Lane, Harkins Road, and Ellins Road to New Carrollton station, partially operating on the former Route F6 routing. The proposed M12 and P1X kept its current proposals.

During the proposals, more changes were made. The proposed P1X was instead rerouted to serve IKEA Way in Beltsville. The proposed P32 was instead rerouted from its proposed College Park–University of Maryland station terminus to serve Greenbelt station via Baltimore Avenue, Greenbelt Road, Cherrywood Lane, and Greenbelt Metro Drive. The new P32 would operate between Fort Totten station and Greenbelt station via Sargent Road, Chillum Road, West Hyattsville station, Ager Road, East-West Highway, Hyattsville Crossing station, Belcrest Road, Toledo Road, Adelphi Road, University Boulevard, Stadium Drive, and Campus Drive before operating on the proposed routing to Greenbelt station. Service to College Park station was instead replaced by the proposed P31 while service in Riggs Park was replaced by the proposed C71. Route M12 had its western terminus switched back to Twinbrook station with service to North Bethesda station replaced by proposed Routes M42 and M44.

On November 21, 2024, WMATA approved its Better Bus Redesign Network, with service on the University Boulevard Line being simplified.

Beginning on June 29, 2025, Route C4 was renamed to the M12 and kept its same routing, with every other trip operating between Wheaton station and Takoma Langley Crossroads only. Route C2 was combined with the F6, operating between Greenbelt and the University of Maryland, then rerouted to serve Fort Totten station via Adelphi Road, Hyattsville Crossing station, Ager Road, West Hyattsville station, and Chillum Road, being renamed to the P32. Service between Takoma Langley and the University of Maryland was replaced by Route P31, which was a modified Route F6.

== Incidents ==
- On September 30, 2010, a C4 bus rear ended a C2 bus along University Boulevard. 26 people were injured in the collision.
- On April 17, 2023, 28-year-old Monte Cunningham was stabbed and killed while getting off a C2 bus at University Boulevard West and Amherst Avenue in Wheaton, Maryland. According to reports, Cunningham and another passenger got into an argument before both got off the bus, and the suspect stabbed Cunningham. On April 17, 2023, the Montgomery County Police arrested 34-year-old Tyrone Curtis in connection to the stabbing and charged him with first-degree murder. Curtis was later found guilty of first-degree murder on January 29, 2024.
