= New Carrollton–Silver Spring Line =

Bus route in Washington, D.C., United States

P30
- New Carrollton-Silver Spring Line

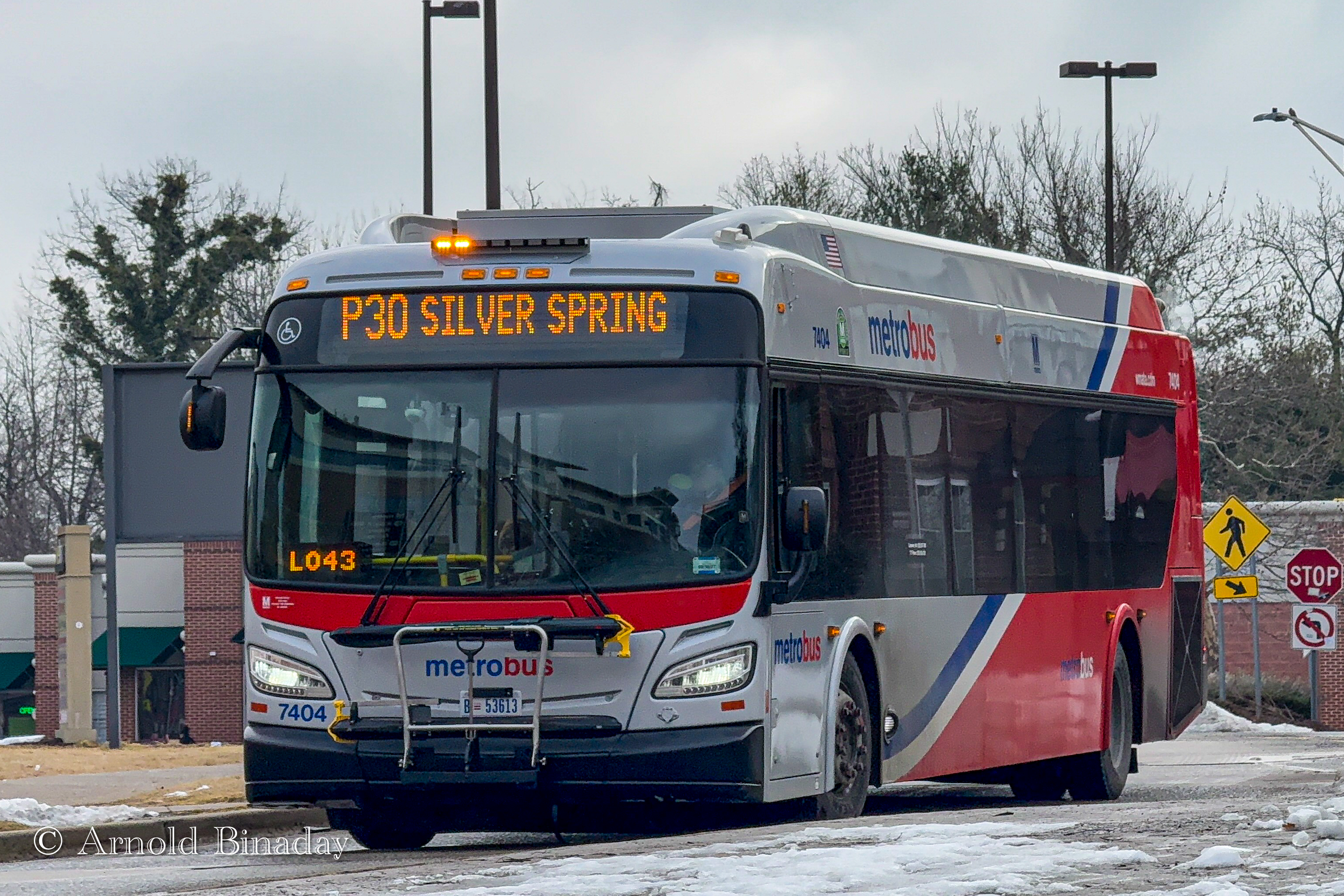
- Route P30 at Hyattsville Crossing station

Overview
- System: Metrobus
- Operator: Washington Metropolitan Area Transit Authority
- Garage: Landover
- Livery: Local
- Status: In Service
- Began service: February 19, 1978
- Predecessors: F4

Route
- Locale: Prince George's County, Montgomery County
- Communities served: New Carrollton, Riverdale, Hyattsville, Lewisdale, Green Meadows, Chillum, Carole Highlands, Takoma Park, Silver Spring
- Landmarks served: Riverdale Park, Hyattsville Crossing station, The Mall at Prince George's, Montgomery College (Takoma Park/Silver Spring Campus)
- Start: New Carrollton station
- Via: Riverdale Road, East-West Highway, Ethan Allen Avenue, Philadelphia Avenue
- End: Silver Spring station

Service
- Level: Daily
- Frequency: 12-15 minutes (7 AM - 9 PM); 30 - 60 minutes (After 9 PM)
- Operates: 4:50 AM – 2:00 AM
- Ridership: 2,882,371 (FY 2025)
- Transfers: SmarTrip only
- Timetable: New Carrollton-Silver Spring Line

The New Carrollton–Silver Spring Line, designated as Route P30, is a daily bus route operated by the Washington Metropolitan Area Transit Authority between New Carrollton station of the Orange and Silver Lines of the Washington Metro and Silver Spring station of the Red Line of the Washington Metro. The line operates every 12 minutes between 7AM and 9PM, and 30–60 minutes after 9PM. P30 trips are roughly 65 minutes long. The line provides service on the East-West Highway corridor from the eastern portion of Prince George's County to Montgomery County.

== Background ==
Route P30 operates daily between New Carrollton station and Silver Spring station connecting both Prince George's County to Montgomery County via the East-West Highway corridor. The route is one of the busiest Metrobus routes within Maryland.

Route P30 begins at New Carrollton and travels via Ellin Road, Harkins Road, and Annapolis Road. The route then turns along Riverdale Road traveling along it before westbound trips turned from Riverdale Road onto Lafayette Avenue, then turns onto Queensbury Road, while eastbound trips turned from Queensbury Road onto 48th Avenue, before turning onto Riverdale Road, buses remain along Queensbury Road, operating until reaching Belcrest Road. The route then turns into Hyattsville Crossing station serving the station before turning back along East-West Highway. The route then operates along East-West Highway, then enters Montgomery County by operating along Ethan Allen Avenue. The route then turns along Philadelphia Avenue until it merges into Fenton Street. The route then turns onto Colesville Road, then on Georgia Avenue, and then onto Wayne Avenue to serve the second level of the Paul S. Sarbanes Transit Center.

Route P30 operates out of Landover division.

=== P30 stops ===
Bus stop	Direction	Connections
Prince George's County, Maryland
New Carrollton Bus Bay H	Westbound station, Eastbound terminal	Metrobus: P20, P21, P24, P31, P35, P40, P42, P60, P61; MTA Maryland Commuter Bus; TheBus: P22, P2X, P23, P44, P52, P5X, P71; Shuttle-UM; Greyhound; Peter Pan Bus Lines; Washington Metro: MARC: Penn Line; Amtrak: Northeast Regional, Palmetto, Vermonter; MTA: Purple Line (Planned)
Harkins Road / Ellin Road	Bidirectional	Metrobus: P20, P21, P24, P31, P35, P40; TheBus: P22
Harkins Road / West Lanham Drive	Bidirectional	Metrobus: P20, P21, P24, P31, P35, P40; TheBus: P22
Harkins Road / Annapolis Road	Bidirectional	Metrobus: P20, P21, P24, P31, P35, P40; TheBus: P22, P2X
Annapolis Road / West Lanham Drive	Bidirectional	Metrobus: P20, P21, P24
Annapolis Road / #7990	Bidirectional	Metrobus: P20, P21, P24
Annapolis Road / Riverdale Road	Eastbound	Metrobus: P20, P21, P24
Riverdale Road / Carrollton Mall	Westbound	TheBus: P22; Shuttle-UM (Eastbound only)
Riverdale Road / Heritage Square Apartments	Bidirectional	TheBus: P22; Shuttle-UM (Eastbound only)
Riverdale Road / Fontainebleau Drive	Eastbound	TheBus: P22; Shuttle-UM
Riverdale Road / Mahoney Drive	Westbound	TheBus: P22
Riverdale Road / #7620	Eastbound	TheBus: P22; Shuttle-UM (Eastbound only)
Riverdale Road / #7613	Westbound	TheBus: P22; Shuttle-UM (Eastbound only)
Riverdale Road / Lamont Drive	Bidirectional	TheBus: P22; Shuttle-UM
Riverdale Road / Finns Lane	Bidirectional	Metrobus: P31, P35
Riverdale Road / Martins Lane	Bidirectional	Metrobus: P31, P35
Riverdale Road / Chestridge Apartments	Westbound	Metrobus: P31, P35
Riverdale Road / Auburn Avenue	Bidirectional	Metrobus: P31, P35, P42
Riverdale Road / Auburn Avenue	Westbound	Metrobus: P31, P42
Riverdale Road / 67th Place	Westbound	Metrobus: P31, P42
Riverdale Road / 67th Avenue	Bidirectional	Metrobus: P31, P42; MTA: Purple Line (at Beacon Heights-East Pines) (Planned)
Riverdale Road / 64th Avenue	Bidirectional	Metrobus: P31, P42
Riverdale Road / Mustang Drive	Eastbound	Metrobus: P31, P42
Riverdale Road / 61st Place	Westbound	Metrobus: P31, P42
Riverdale Road / 57th Avenue	Bidirectional	Metrobus: P14, P31, P42; MTA: Purple Line (at Riverdale Park-Kenilworth) (Planned)
Riverdale Road / 54th Avenue	Bidirectional	Metrobus: P35
Riverdale Road / Tanglewood Drive	Bidirectional	Metrobus: P35
Riverdale Road / Calvert Park Apartments	Bidirectional	Metrobus: P35
Riverdale Road / Taylor Road	Bidirectional	Metrobus: P35
Riverdale Road / 49th Avenue	Eastbound	Metrobus: P35
Riverdale Road / 48th Avenue	Westbound	Metrobus: P35
Queensbury Road / Rhode Island Avenue	Bidriectional	Metrobus: P35
Lafayette Avenue / Queensbury Road	Westbound	Metrobus: P35
Queensbury Road / Baltimore Avenue	Eastbound	Metrobus: P1X, P35
Queensbury Road / 44th Place	Westbound	Metrobus: P1X, P35
Queensbury Road / 42nd Place	Bidirectional	Metrobus: P35
Queensbury Road / 41st Avenue	Bidirectional	Metrobus: P10, P35
Belcrest Road / Queens Chapel Road	Bidirectional	Metrobus: P10, P33, P35; TheBus: P43
Hyattsville Crossing Bus Bays D and G	Bidirectional	Metrobus: M12, M44, P10, P32, P33, P35; TheBus: P43; Shuttle-UM: 113; Washington Metro:
East-West Highway / Hyattsville Crossing Entrance	Bidirectional	Metrobus: P32, P35; TheBus: P43; Washington Metro:
East-West Highway / Toledo Terrace	Bidirectional	Metrobus: M12, P32, P35; TheBus: P43
East-West Highway / 23rd Avenue	Bidirectional	Metrobus: M12, P15, P16, P35; TheBus: P43
East-West Highway / Ager Road	Bidirectional	Metrobus: M12, P15, P16, P35
East-West Highway / 19th Place	Bidirectional	Metrobus: M12, P15, P16, P35
East-West Highway / Riggs Road	Bidirectional	
East-West Highway / Chillum Manor Drive	Bidirectional	
East-West Highway / Fairview Avenue	Eastbound	
East-West Highway / Linden Avenue	Westbound	
East-West Highway / Kentland Avenue	Westbound	
East-West Highway / New Hampshire Avenue	Bidirectional	Metrobus: M60, M6X; Ride On: 16
Montgomery County, Maryland
Ethan Allen Avenue / Elm Avenue	Bidirectional	Ride On: 16
Ethan Allen Avenue / Jackson Avenue	Bidirectional	Ride On: 16
Carroll Avenue / Grant Avenue	Eastbound	Ride On: 16
Ethan Allen Avenue / Carroll Avenue	Bidirectional	Ride On: 16
Philadelphia Avenue / Holt Place/Avenue	Bidirectional	Ride On: 18
Philadelphia Avenue / Maple Avenue	Westbound	Ride On: 18
Philadelphia Avenue / Cedar Avenue	Eastbound	Ride On: 17
Philadelphia Avenue / Holly Avenue	Bidirectional	Ride On: 17
Philadelphia Avenue / Takoma Avenue	Bidirectional	Ride On: 17
Philadelphia Avenue / Chicago Avenue	Bidirectional	Ride On: 17
Fenton Street / Philadelphia Avenue	Bidirectional	Ride On: 17
Fenton Street / Silver Spring Avenue	Bidirectional	Ride On: 16, 17
Fenton Street / Thayer Avenue	Bidirectional	Ride On: 16, 17
Fenton Street / Bonifant Street	Bidirectional	Ride On: 16, 17, 20, 28 (Eastbound only); MTA: Purple Line (at Silver Spring Library) (Planned)
Fenton Street / Wayne Avenue	Westbound	Ride On: 16, 17, 20
Fenton Street / Ellsworth Drive	Eastbound	Ride On: 15, 16, 17, 20, 28
Fenton Street / Roeder Road	Bidirectional	Metrobus: M52, M54; Ride On: 15, 16, 17, 19, 20, 28 (Eastbound only), Flash BRT (Blue, Orange)
Georgia Avenue / Ellsworth Drive	Eastbound	Metrobus: M20; Ride On: 12, 13, 14, 16, 17, 20
Silver Spring Bus Bay 223	Eastbound station, Westbound terminal	Metrobus: C87, D40, D4X, D60, D6X, M20, M52, M54, M70; Ride On: 1, 2, 4, 5, 8, 9, 11, 12, 13, 14, 15, 16, 17, 18, 19, 20, 21, 22, 28, Flash BRT (Blue, Orange); MTA Maryland Bus: 915, 929; Shuttle-UM: 111; Peter Pan Bus; Washington Metro: MARC: Brunswick Line; MTA: Purple Line (Planned)

== History ==
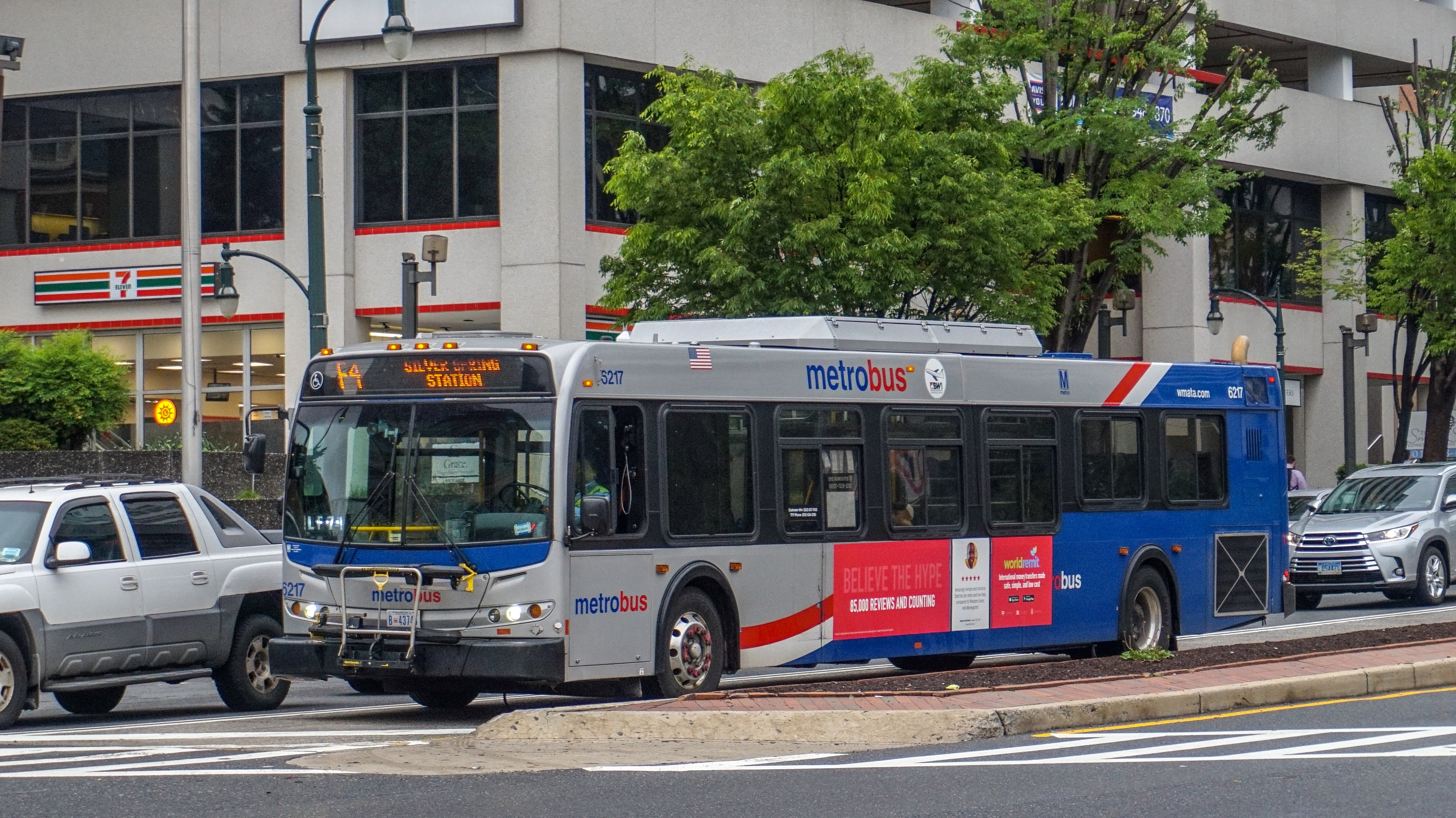
Former Route F4 in Silver Spring in May 2018

Before WMATA implemented the Better Bus Redesign network, Route P30 was previously known as Route F4. Prior to February 19, 1978, F4 originally operated as part of the Michigan Avenue Line between Avondale (Eastern Avenue & Michigan Avenue NE) and Archives (9th Street NW & Constitution Avenue NW). F6 had a prior incarnation as the Sargent Road Line, when it operated as a Capital Transit Company bus route between Green Meadows and 12th & Quincy Street NE in Brookland, D.C. during the 1940s. However, the F6 was eventually truncated to operate between Gallatin Street NE & South Dakota Avenue NE in North Michigan Park, D.C. 12th & Quincy Street NE in Brookland, D.C. in 1949, before ultimately being discontinued in 1958.

The New Carrollton-Silver Spring Line was derived from the former DC Transit East-West Highway Line Route J4.

The original J4 began operating between the University of Maryland and Friendship Heights, via Campus Drive, Baltimore Avenue, Queens Chapel Road, East-West Highway, Prince George's Plaza, Belcrest Road, Queens Chapel Road, Hamilton Street, Ager Road, East-West Highway, Ethan-Allen Avenue, Philadelphia Avenue, Fenton Street, Sligo Avenue, Georgia Avenue, Wayne Avenue, Fenton Street, Colesville Road, East-West Highway, and Wisconsin Avenue around 1961. In 1962, Over time, the J4 was rerouted between the University of Maryland College Park Campus and Prince George's Plaza via Campus Drive, Adelphi Road, and Belcrest Road.

In October 1963, the J4 was extended from the University of Maryland to Beltway Plaza Mall, via Baltimore Avenue and Greenbelt Road. J4 eventually became a WMATA Metrobus Route on February 4, 1973, when WMATA acquired DC Transit and formed its Metrobus System.

Around 1975, J2 was formed as a brand new Metrobus Route to operate as part of the East-West Highway Line alongside the J4, except it would operate between Beltway Plaza and Montgomery Mall. The J2 would operate on East-West Highway between the Prince George's Plaza Shopping Center and the intersection of Ager Road in Green Meadows instead of operating along Belcrest Road, Queens Chapel Road, Hamilton Street, and Ager Road.

On February 19, 1978 shortly after Silver Spring opened, Routes J2 and J4 were truncated to only operate between Friendship Heights (J4)/Montgomery Mall (J2) and Silver Spring station. The East-West Highway Line was split into two routes. Routes J2, J4, and a brand new J3 were renamed into the Bethesda–Silver Spring Line operating on its current route between Friendship Heights and Montgomery Mall and Silver Spring, while the portion between Silver Spring and Prince George's Plaza was renamed into the Prince George's-Silver Spring Line, operated by new Routes F4 and F6.

Routes F4 and F6 operated between Silver Spring and New Carrollton (F4) and Greenbelt (F6). Both routes operated parallel with each other between Silver Spring and East-West Highway & Ager Road in Green Meadows, then split from each other. Route F4 would operate along the former J2's routing along East-West Highway, then would operate to New Carrollton Mall via Belcrest Road, Queensbury Road, 48th Avenue (towards New Carrollton)/Lafayette Avenue (towards the Silver Spring Metro Station), and Riverdale Road. Route F6 would operate along the former J4's routing Ager Road, Hamilton Street, Queens Chapel Road, and Belcrest Road, University of Maryland, Baltimore Avenue, Greenbelt Road, and Beltway Plaza. After serving Beltway Plaza, Route F6 would operate to Greenbelt Center via Greenbelt Road, Lakecrest Drive, Lakeside Drive, Westway, Ridge Road, Gardenway, Crescent Road, and Southway. During rush hours, the F6 would operate to Goddard Space Flight Center via Southway and Greenbelt Road.

On December 3, 1978 shortly after the New Carrollton station opened, F4 was extended from its original terminus at New Carrollton Mall to New Carrollton station.

On December 11, 1993, the F6 was rerouted to operate between New Carrollton and Prince George's Plaza station, via Ellin Road, Harkins Road, Finns Lane, Riverdale Road, Auburn Avenue, Good Luck Road, Kenilworth Avenue, River Road, College Park–University of Maryland station, River Road, Kenilworth Avenue, East-West Highway, Prince George's Plaza, Belcrest Road, Queens Chapel Road, Ager Road, West Hyattsville station, Ager Road, and East-West Highway. Service to Beltway Plaza and Greenbelt Center was replaced by extended route C2. During this time, F4 was also rerouted to serve the Prince George's Plaza station.

Around the 1990s, Route F6 would discontinue service to Silver Spring station and terminate at Prince George's Plaza.

Around 1996, after Paint Branch Parkway was finished being completed route F6 was rerouted to operate between the Prince George's Plaza and College Park station, via its original routing via Belcrest Road, Adelphi Road, and Campus Drive, then via Paint Branch Parkway and River Road. Once this change took place, F6's routing on Kenilworth Avenue between River Road and Prince George's Plaza was discontinued.

On September 12, 1999, route F6 was re-extended to Silver Spring station via West Hyattsville station. The route operated along Queens Chapel Road, Hamilton Street and Ager Road to serve West Hyattsville, then follow route F4's routing to Silver Spring along East-West Highway, Ethan Allen Avenue, and Philadelphia Avenue.

On June 30, 2002, new Sunday service was added to the F4, operating every hour between 8:30 am to 9:30 pm.

On May 15, 2003, the original bus bays inside Prince Georges Plaza mall, were demolished in order to build a new Target store. Routes F4 and F6, along with routes 86, C4, F8, R2, R3, and R4 have stopped entering and looping inside around the mall.

On February 20, 2006, the line was changed from the Prince George's-Silver Spring Line to the New Carrollton-Silver Spring Line.

On September 28, 2008, the former Silver Spring Bus Bay was closed and ultimately demolished so that the new Silver Spring Transit Center could be built. Both routes F4 and F6 terminated at the temporary stop that WMATA placed at a curb, located on the northbound side of the intersection of Wayne Avenue & Colesville Road.

As the result of an accident between a MARC commuter train and two F4 buses on the railroad crossing at Riverdale station on March 26, 2009, route F4 was rerouted to operate along the East-West Highway bridge between Queensbury Road and Baltimore Avenue via 49th Avenue, Queensbury Road, Taylor Road, and turning onto East-West Highway to prevent another accident from happening on the railroad crossing. Service between Riverdale Road and 49th Avenue plus Queensbury Road and East-West Highway was discontinued. Alternative service was replaced by TheBus Route 14 on the weekdays until TheBus 14 discontinued service to Riverdale station in 2019.

In 2010, WMATA proposed to split the F4 and F6 routing into two routes. While the F4 remained the same, the F6 was proposed to be rerouted to serve Fort Totten, keeping its routing between the New Carrollton station & intersection of East-West Highway & Riggs Road the same, except route F6 would be rerouted to operate on the Route R3 routing between the intersection of Riggs Road & East-West Highway & Fort Totten along East-West Highway, Riggs Road, Sargent Road. This was proposed to reduce redundancy with F4 between Silver Spring station and the East West Highway and Riggs Road intersection. The proposal was brought up again in 2012 with the same similarities.

In May 2012, WMATA announced that route F6 would be rerouted to operate between New Carrollton & Fort Totten station to replace route R3 keeping the same routing between New Carrollton and the East-West Highway and Riggs Road intersection but running along route R3 routing to Fort Totten from there. Route F6 will now operate on R3's former routing between the intersection of Riggs Road & East-West Highway & Fort Totten station beginning on June 17, 2012. Route F4 also began operating every 12–20 minutes during the weekdays and 30 minutes on Sundays as a result of the changes to reduce crowding from F6 riders.

With the Silver Spring Transit Center opening in September 2015, route F4 was rerouted along Fenton Street and Colesville to serve the new transit center. Route F4 was given Bus Bay 223 on Level 2 sharing the Bus Bay with the J4.

During the COVID-19 pandemic, the F4 operated on its Saturday supplemental schedule beginning on March 16, 2020. It however began operating on its Sunday service on March 18, 2020. Weekend service was also reduced to operate every 30 minutes. Route F4 regular service was restored on August 23, 2020.

In February 2021 during WMATA's FY2022 budget crisis, WMATA proposed to add late-night service to 2:00 AM on Route F4 beginning in July 2021, but would reduce it back to midnight beginning in January 2022. Subsequently on April 22, 2021, WMATA approved the FY2022 budget and received federal funding to avoid service cuts.

On March 14, 2021, new short trips between New Carrollton and Prince George's Plaza (now Hyattsville Crossing) stations were introduced to reduce crowding on its buses.

On June 6, 2021, late-night service was increased to operate up to 2:00 AM on Route C4.

On June 10, 2021, WMATA proposed to increase the F4 to operate every 12 minutes daily between 7:00 AM to 9:00 PM daily as part of WMATA's Pandemic Recovery Plan. Service was also proposed to be rerouted inside Riverdale Park, restoring its pre-March 2009 routing. On September 5, 2021, service was rerouted along Queensbury Road between Baltimore Avenue and 49th Avenue, restoring its pre-2009 routing. Service along Baltimore Avenue was eliminated. Service was also increased to operate every 12 minutes daily between 7 a.m. to 9 p.m.

Due to rising cases of the COVID-19 Omicron variant, the line was reduced to its Saturday service on weekdays beginning on January 10, 2022. Full weekday service resumed on February 7, 2022.

In 2024 during WMATA's FY2024 Budget crisis, WMATA proposed to eliminate all F4 service after midnight. However on April 25, 2024, Metro’s Board of Directors approved a $4.8 billion capital and operating budget which avoided service cuts.

=== Better Bus Redesign ===
In 2022, WMATA launched its Better Bus Redesign project, which aimed to redesign the entire Metrobus Network and is the first full redesign of the agency's bus network in its history.

In April 2023, WMATA launched its Draft Visionary Network. As part of the drafts, WMATA proposed to rename the F4 to Route MD145, and kept the same routing from the current F4. During WMATA's Revised Draft Visionary Network, WMATA renamed the MD145 to Route P30 and kept its same routing. The change were then proposed during WMATA's 2025 Proposed Network.

On November 21, 2024, WMATA approved its Better Bus Redesign Network.

Beginning on June 29, 2025, Route F4 was renamed to the P30 and kept the same routing as the former F4.

== Incidents ==
- On March 27, 2009, a MARC commuter train struck an F4 bus while it was crossing along the Queensbury Road railroad crossing. The F4 bus (D40LFR 6040) then hit another F4 bus that was turning (Flxible Metro 9731) causing damage to both buses. After the accident, route F4 was rerouted along East-West Highway to no longer serve the Queensbury Road railroad crossing and to prevent another accident from happening.
- On April 11, 2018, a man armed with a knife attempted to hijack an F4 bus after trying to rob a passenger along Riverdale Road. The driver of the bus pulled over and called emergency help. The man demanded everyone to get off the bus and tried taking off with the bus but was stopped due to a security feature that was equipped during an emergency. A Prince George's County police officer was able to detain the suspect and Metro Transit Police shortly after arrested the suspect. None of the 16 passengers on board or the driver were injured.
- On January 17, 2025, an F4 bus crashed into a vacant building in Riverdale, Maryland after the driver suffered a medical emergency. None of the passengers were injured however the driver passed away.
