= New Hampshire Avenue Line =

M60
- New Hampshire Avenue Line

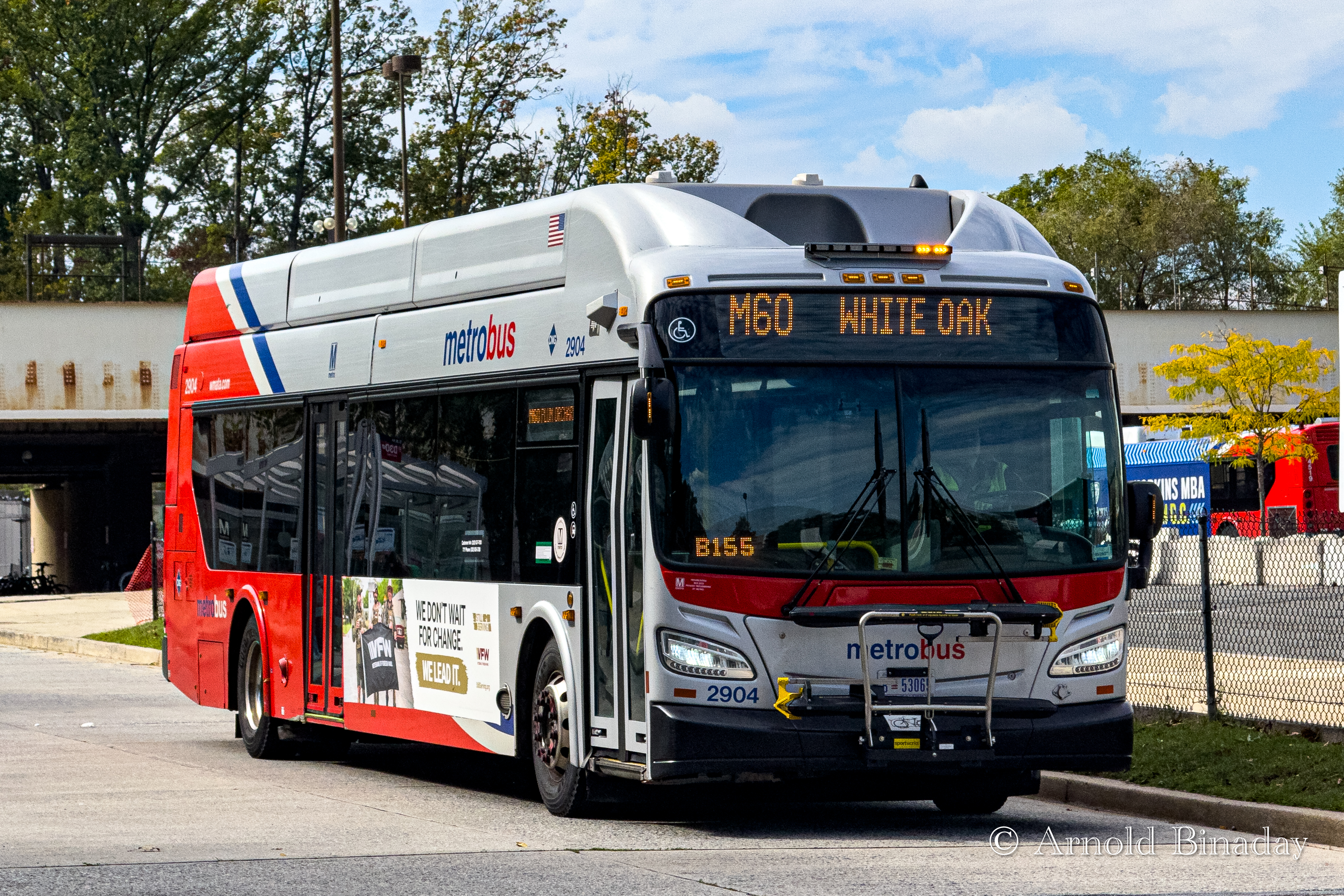
- Route M60 at Fort Totten Station in October 2025

Overview
- System: Metrobus
- Operator: Washington Metropolitan Area Transit Authority
- Garage: Bladensburg
- Livery: Local
- Status: In Service
- Began service: 1964
- Predecessors: K6

Route
- Locale: Northeast, Prince George's County, Montgomery County
- Communities served: Fort Totten, Manor Park, Chillum, Langley Park, Adelphi, Takoma Park, Hillandale, White Oak, Calverton
- Landmarks served: White Oak Medical Center, East County Education Center, Federal Research Center/Food and Drug Administration, Northwest Park, Langley Park, Takoma Langley Crossroads Transit Center, Chillum, Fort Totten station
- Start: Fort Totten station
- Via: New Hampshire Avenue
- End: White Oak Medical Center
- Length: 40–50 minutes
- Other routes: M6X New Hampshire Avenue Express

Service
- Frequency: 10–12 minutes (Weekdays 7AM-9PM); 12 minutes (Weekends 7AM-9PM); 30 minutes (After 9PM)
- Operates: 4:30 AM – 2:00 AM (Weekdays); 5:00 AM – 2:00 AM (Saturdays); 5:30 AM – 2:00 AM (Sundays)
- Ridership: 2,877,168 (FY 2025)
- Transfers: SmarTrip only
- Timetable: New Hampshire Avenue Line

The New Hampshire Avenue Line, designated Route M60, is a daily bus route operated by the Washington Metropolitan Area Transit Authority between Fort Totten station on the Red, Green and Yellow Lines of the Washington Metro and White Oak Medical Center. The line operates every 12 minutes during most times. Route M60 trips take roughly 50 minutes from end-to-end.

== Background ==
Route M60 operates daily between Fort Totten station and White Oak Medical Center via New Hampshire Avenue providing service between the two points. Route M60 operates out of Bladensburg division. The line originally operated out of Montgomery division until 2019.

=== M60 stops ===
Bus stop	Direction	Connections
Northeast Washington, D.C.
Fort Totten station Bus Bay A	Northbound station, Southbound terminal	Metrobus: C71, C77, C81, D30, D44, M6X, P15, P16, P32, P35; Washington Metro:
Fort Totten station Bus Bay K	Northbound	Metrobus: C71, C77, C81, D30, D44, M6X, P15, P16, P32, P35; Washington Metro:
First Place NE / Riggs Road NE	Northbound	Metrobus: C71, C77, D44, P15, P16
First Place NE / Ingraham Street NE	Southbound	Metrobus: C71, C77, D44, P15, P16
Riggs Road NE / Blair Road NE	Northbound	Metrobus: C77, C81, D44
Riggs Road NE / Rock Creek Church Road NE	Southbound	Metrobus: C77, C81, D44
Riggs Road NE / North Capitol Street NE	Bidirectional	Metrobus: C77, C81, D44
New Hampshire Avenue NE / Madison Street NE	Bidirectional	
New Hampshire Avenue NE / Peabody Street NE	Bidirectional	
New Hampshire Avenue NE / Rittenhouse Street NE	Bidirectional	
Prince George's County, Maryland
New Hampshire Avenue / Eastern Avenue	Bidirectional	Metrobus: M6X, P42
New Hampshire Avenue / Sheridan Street	Bidirectional	
New Hampshire Avenue / Poplar Avenue	Southbound	Metrobus: M6X
New Hampshire Avenue / Ray Road	Northbound	Metrobus: M6X
New Hampshire Avenue / Belford Place	Northbound	Metrobus: M6X
New Hampshire Avenue / Maryland Route 410	Southbound	
New Hampshire Avenue / East-West Highway	Northbound	Metrobus: M6X, P30; Ride On: 16
New Hampshire Avenue / Auburn Avenue	Southbound	Metrobus: M6X, P30; Ride On: 16
New Hampshire Avenue / East-West Highway	Northbound	Metrobus: M6X, P30; Ride On: 16
Montgomery County, Maryland
New Hampshire Avenue / Larch Avenue	Bidirectional	Ride On: 16
New Hampshire Avenue / Glenside Drive	Southbound	Metrobus: M6X; Ride On: 16
New Hampshire Avenue / Erskine Street	Northbound	Metrobus: M6X; Ride On: 16
New Hampshire Avenue / Merwood Drive	Bidirectional	Ride On: 16
New Hampshire Avenue / Holton Lane	Bidirectional	Ride On: 16
New Hampshire Avenue / Kirklynn Avenue	Southbound	Ride On: 16
Prince George's County, Maryland
Takoma Langley Crossroads Transit Center Bus Bays A and G	Bidirectional	Metrobus: M12, M6X, P31; Ride On: 15, 16, 17, 18, 25; TheBus: P43; Shuttle-UM: 129; MTA: Purple Line (Planned)
New Hampshire Avenue / Merrimac Drive	Bidirectional	Metrobus: M6X, P31; TheBus: P43; Ride On: 16
New Hampshire Avenue / Quebec Street	Bidirectional	Ride On: 16
New Hampshire Avenue / Ruatan Street	Bidirectional	Ride On: 16
Southampton Drive / Ames Road	Southbound	Ride On: 20, 24
Southampton Drive / #201	Northbound	Ride On: 20, 24
Southampton Drive / Ames Road	Bidirectional	Ride On: 20, 24
Southampton Drive / Beacon Road	Bidirectional	Ride On: 20, 24
Northampton Drive / Colony Road	Bidirectional	Ride On: 20, 24
Northampton Drive / Beacon Road	Bidirectional	Ride On: 20, 24
Northampton Drive / Avenel Road	Bidirectional	Metrobus: M6X; Ride On: 20, 24; TheBus: P37
Montgomery County, Maryland
New Hampshire Avenue / Adelphi Road	Northbound	Metrobus: P15; Ride On: 20, 24; TheBus: P37; Shuttle-UM
New Hampshire Avenue / Dilston Road	Southbound	Metrobus: P15; Ride On: 20, 24; TheBus: P37; Shuttle-UM
New Hampshire Avenue / Oakview Drive	Bidirectional	Ride On: 20, 24
New Hampshire Avenue / Elton Road	Bidirectional	Ride On: 20, 24
New Hampshire Avenue / Powder Mill Road	Bidirectional	Metrobus: M6X; Ride On: 20, 22, 24
New Hampshire Avenue / Overlook Drive	Bidirectional	Ride On: 20, 22
New Hampshire Avenue / #10501	Northbound	Ride On: 20, 22
New Hampshire Avenue / Chalmers Road	Bidirectional	Ride On: 20, 22
New Hampshire Avenue / Ruppert Road	Southbound	
New Hampshire Avenue / Schindler Drive	Southbound	Ride On: 22
New Hampshire Avenue / Mahan Road	Northbound	Ride On: 22
New Hampshire Avenue / Northwest Drive	Bidirectional	Ride On: 22
New Hampshire Avenue / Lockwood Drive	Bidirectional	Metrobus: M42, M52, M54; Ride On: 22, Flash BRT (Orange)
Lockwood Drive / New Hampshire Avenue	Bidirectional	Metrobus: M42, M52, M54; Ride On: 22, Flash BRT (Orange)
Lockwood Drive / White Oak Transit Center	Bidirectional	Metrobus: M42, M52, M54; Ride On: 22, Flash BRT (Orange)
Lockwood Drive / White Oak Park Apartments	Bidirectional	Metrobus: M42, M52, M54
Lockwood Drive / December Drive	Bidirectional	Metrobus: M42, M52, M54
Stuart Lane / April Lane	Bidirectional	Metrobus: M42, M52, M54; Ride On: Flash BRT (Orange)
Stuart Lane / Montgomery White Oak Apartments	Bidirectional	Metrobus: M42, M52, M54
Stuart Lane / Old Columbia Pike	Bidirectional	Metrobus: M42, M52, M54
Tech Road / Prosperity Drive	Bidirectional	Metrobus: M42, M44; Ride On: Flash BRT (Orange)
Broadbirch Drive / Tech Road	Northbound	Metrobus: M42, M44
Broadbirch Drive / #2200 Hilton Garden Inn	Southbound	Metrobus: M42, M44
Broadbirch Drive / Bournefield Way	Bidirectional	Metrobus: M42, M44, M52; Ride On: 27
Broadbirch Drive / Plum Orchard Drive	Bidirectional	Metrobus: M42, M44, M52; Ride On: 27
Broadbirch Drive / Cherry Hill Road	Southbound	Metrobus: M42, M44, M52, P16; Ride On: 27
Cherry Hill Road / Plum Orchard Drive	Southbound	Metrobus: M42, M44, P16; Ride On: 27
Plum Orchard Drive / ReStore	Southbound	Metrobus: M42, M44, P16; Ride On: 27
Plum Orchard Drive / Broadbirch Drive	Northbound	Metrobus: M42, M44, P16; Ride On: 27
Plum Orchard Drive / Adventist White Oak Medical Center	Southbound station, Northbound terminal	Metrobus: M42, M44, P16; Ride On: 27

== History ==
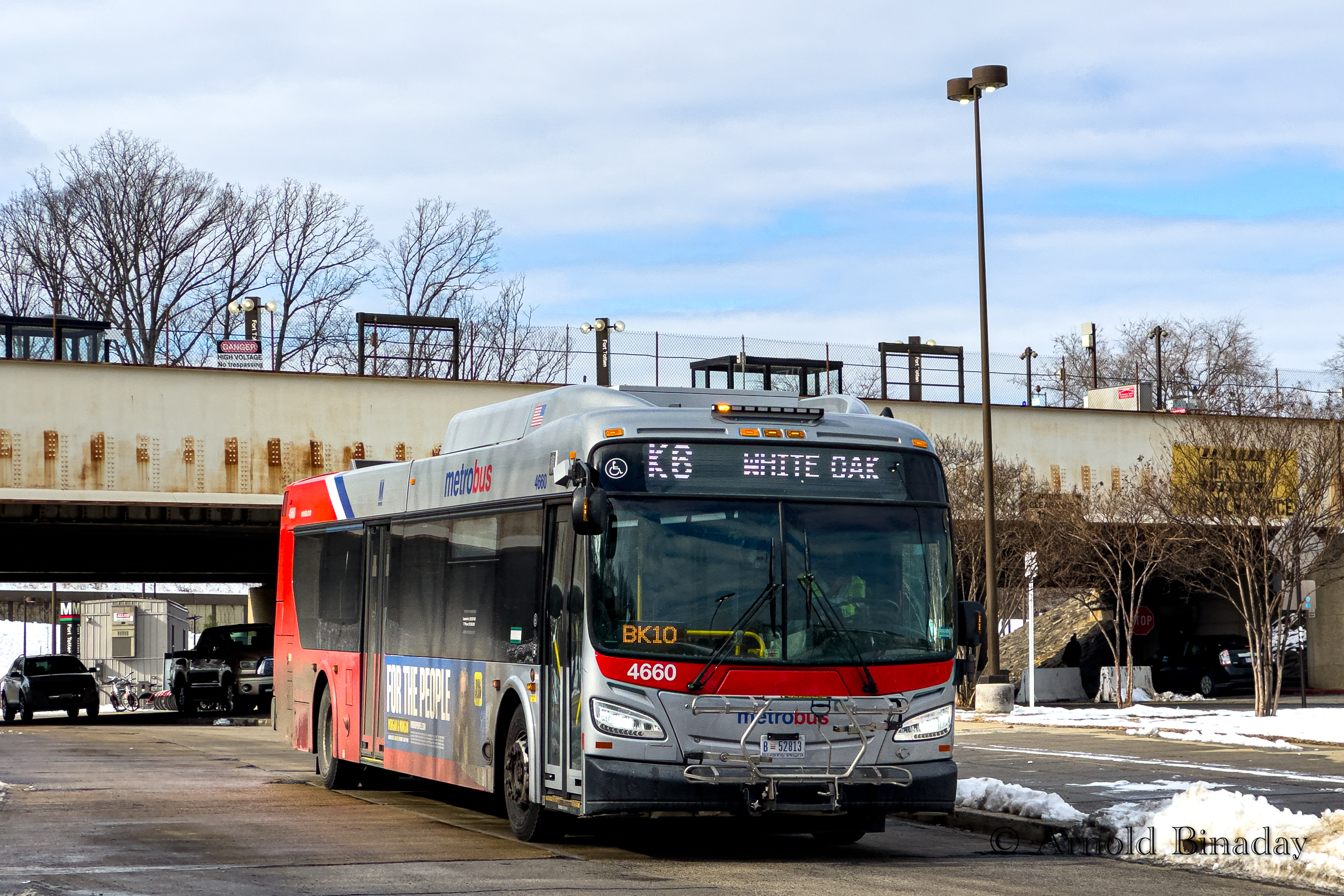
Former Route K6 at Fort Totten Station in January 2025

Prior to WMATA's Better Bus Redesign network, Route M60 was originally known as Route K6. K6 originally began operating as part of the Capital Transit Company "New Hampshire Avenue" Bus Line in 1964, between White Oak Shopping Center in White Oak, Maryland, and Metro Center in Downtown Washington D.C. mostly operating along Columbia Pike, New Hampshire Avenue, the White Oak FDA/FRC Building, and North Capitol Street NW. K6 eventually became a WMATA Metrobus route on February 4, 1973, when WMATA bought all four failing private bus companies that operated throughout the Washington, D.C., Metropolitan Area and merged them all together to form its own Metrobus System.

On February 19, 1978, after Fort Totten station opened, K6 was truncated to only operate between the White Oak Shopping Center and Fort Totten station. The remaining segment of K6's original routing between Fort Totten and Metro Center was replaced by WMATA's brand new route K4, which was designed to operate between Fort Totten and Metro Center.

On December 29, 2013, route K6 discontinued all service to the Food and Drug Administration and instead remained straight along New Hampshire Avenue. Service would be replaced by route K9 which was extended from Northwest Park.

When the Takoma Langley Crossroads Transit Center opened on December 22, 2016, the K6 was rerouted, along with several other Metrobus, Ride On buses, Shuttle UM and TheBus routes, to serve the newly opened Transit Center. Route K6 would serve Bus Bay A (Northbound) and Bus Bay G (Southbound) alongside route K9.

During the COVID-19 pandemic, the K6 operated on its Saturday supplemental schedule beginning on March 16, 2020. It however began operating on its Sunday service on March 18, 2020. Weekend service was also reduced to operate every 30 minutes. Route K6 regular service was restored on August 23, 2020.

On September 5, 2021, service was also increased to operate every 12 minutes daily between 7 a.m. to 9 p.m.

On June 25, 2023, northbound K6 trips was rerouted to Stuart Lane and Lockwood Drive to terminate in White Oak, service along Old Columbia Pike and inside of White Oak Shopping Center was discontinued.

In 2024 during WMATA's FY2024 Budget crisis, WMATA proposed to eliminate all midnight trips daily on the K6. However on April 25, 2024, Metro’s Board of Directors approved a $4.8 billion capital and operating budget which avoided service cuts.

=== Better Bus Redesign ===
In 2022, WMATA launched its Better Bus Redesign project, which aimed to redesign the entire Metrobus Network and is the first full redesign of the agency's bus network in its history.

In April 2023, WMATA launched its Draft Visionary Network. As part of the drafts, WMATA proposed to extend the K6 to White Oak Medical Center via Columbia Pike, Tech Road, Broadbirch Drive, Cherry Hill Road, and Plum Orchard Drive. The line would be named Route MD243 in the proposals. Additionally, WMATA also proposed a Route MD144 (Route K9) between Fort Totten station and Colesville via New Hampshire Avenue and would operate alongside the proposed Route MD243. The proposed Route MD144 would combine the existing Route K6 and the current Route C8 and Z2 routing between the intersection of Columbia Pike & New Hampshire Avenue, and the intersection of New Hampshire Avenue & Randolph Road. The difference between the MD144 and the MD243 was that the MD144 would not serve Northwest Park.

During WMATA's Revised Draft Visionary Network, WMATA renamed the MD144 to Route M6X and converted it to a limited-stop express. The MD243 was renamed to Route M62. Both routes kept their same proposed routing. All changes were then proposed during WMATA's 2025 Proposed Network.

During the proposal, the M6X was cut back from Colesville to the Food and Drug Administration headquarters and ultimately became the current routing of Route K9. Route M62 was also renamed to Route M60 and kept its proposed routing.

On November 21, 2024, WMATA approved its Better Bus Redesign Network.

Beginning on June 29, 2025, Route K6 was extended to White Oak Medical Center via Columbia Pike, Tech Road, Broadirch Drive, Cherry Hill Road, and Plum Orchard Drive, and was renamed to the M60. The routing was the same between Fort Totten station and the intersection of New Hampshire Avenue & Lockwood Drive in White Oak.

== Incidents ==
- On December 30, 2013, around 3:30 p.m., a K6 driver was killed when her bus began rolling without anybody on board and pinned the driver to a wall at White Oak Shopping Center. Preliminary investigation indicated that the driver attempted to engage the brake by reaching through the driver's window before becoming pinned to the bus. The driver suffered serious injuries and was pronounced dead several hours later.
- On April 14, 2020, a car crashed into the back of a K6 bus around 10 p.m. leaving the three people inside the car pinned and severely injured.
