= Takoma Langley Crossroads Transit Center =

Bus transit facility in Langley Park, Maryland

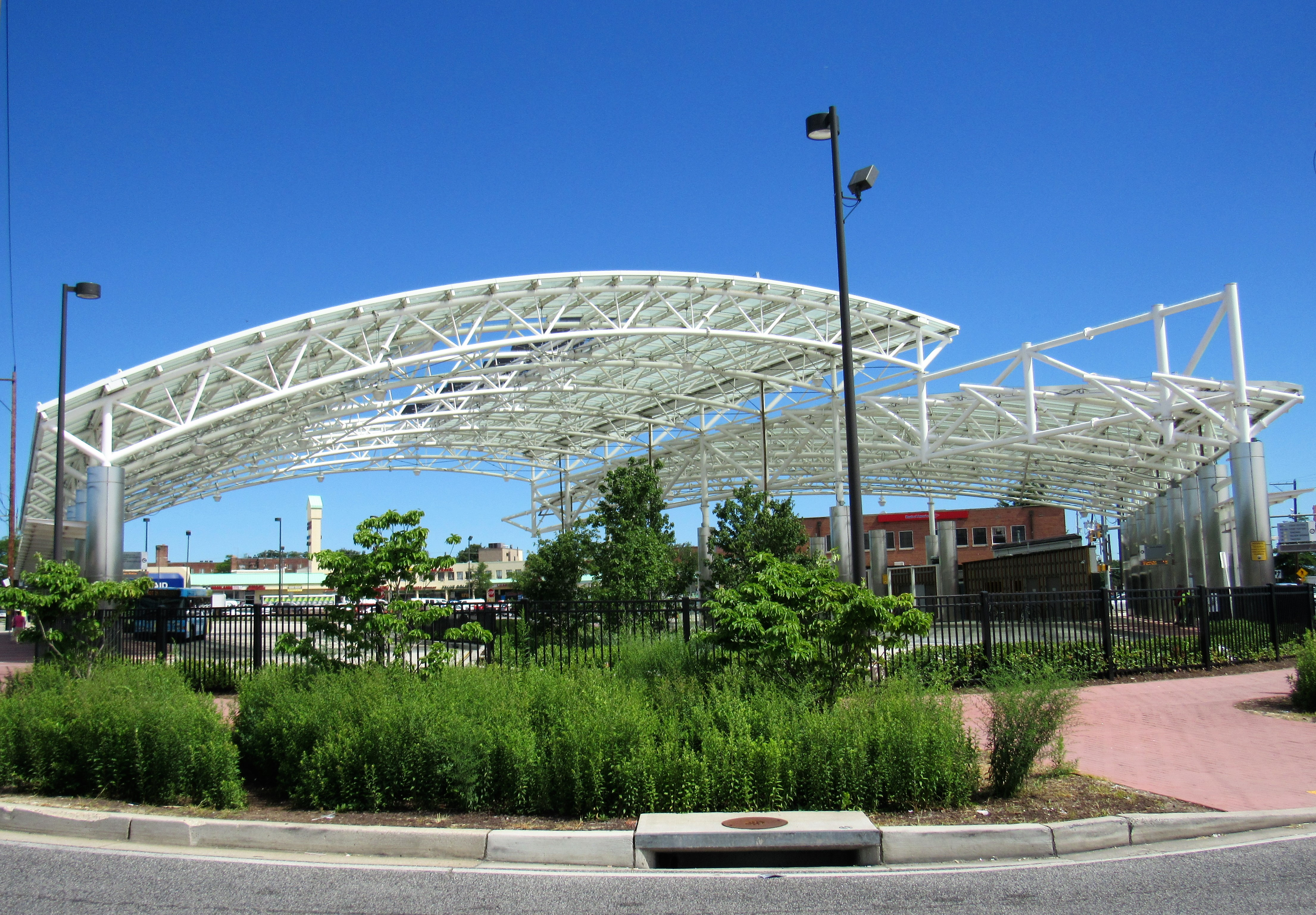
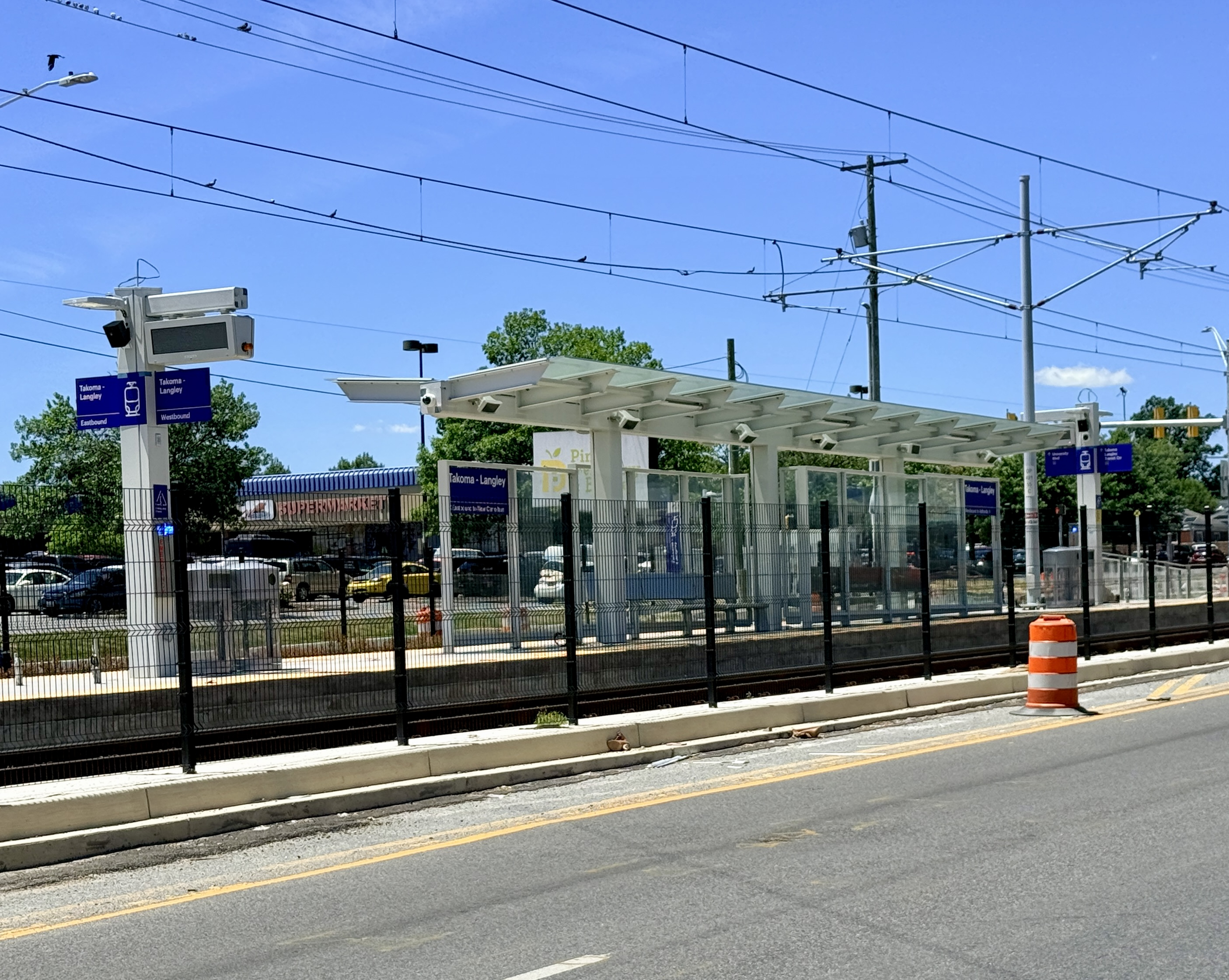
- The Transit Center (top) and future Purple Line station (bottom) in June 2026

General information
- Location: 7900 New Hampshire Avenue; Langley Park, Maryland; United States
- Coordinates: 38.990072°N 76.988710°W
- Owner: Maryland Transit Administration
- Bus routes: 11
- Bus stands: 12
- Bus operators: GoPGC; Ride On; Metrobus; Shuttle-UM

Construction
- Structure type: Covered pavilion
- Parking: No
- Cycle facilities: No
- Accessible: Yes

History
- Opened: 22 December 2016

Passengers
- 12,000 daily

Future services
Preceding station	Maryland Transit Administration	Following station
Piney Branch Road toward Bethesda	Purple Line	Riggs Road toward New Carrollton
Location

The Takoma Langley Crossroads Transit Center is a bus transit center and future Purple Line light rail station in Langley Park, Maryland. Located at the intersection of University Boulevard and New Hampshire Avenue, it is the largest bus-only transfer in the Washington, D.C. metropolitan area.

== History ==
The center was delayed by negotiations over land. Construction started in the spring of 2013, with an expected completion date in the fall of 2015. The $34.8-million transit center was designed to ease bus transfers and improve pedestrian safety. It ultimately opened on December 22, 2016.

As of 2026, the Purple Line is planned to open in late 2027. It will have an island platform in the median of University Boulevard just west of New Hampshire Avenue.

== Routes ==
Bay	Route	Operator	Destination
A	16 - New Hampshire/Langley Park	Ride On	Silver Spring Transit Center
A	111 - University of Maryland	Shuttle-UM	Silver Spring Transit Center
A	M12 - University Boulevard	WMATA	Wheaton Metro
A	M12 - University Boulevard	WMATA	Twinbrook Metro via Veirs Mill Road
A	M60 - New Hampshire Avenue Local	WMATA	White Oak Adventist Hospital
A	M6X - New Hampshire Avenue Limited	WMATA	FDA White Oak Campus
B	P43 - Takoma Langley/Addison Road	GoPGC	Addison Road Metro Station
C	P31 - Takoma Langley/New Carrollton	WMATA	New Carrollton Metro Station
D	111 - University of Maryland	Shuttle-UM	Student Union
D	M12 - University Boulevard	WMATA	Hyattsville Crossing Metro Station
E	17 - Philadelhpia	Ride On	Silver Spring Transit Center
F	15 - Manchester	Ride On	Silver Spring Transit Center
G	16 - New Hampshire/Langley Park	Ride On	Takoma Metro Station
G	18 - Carroll/Fenton	Ride On	Silver Spring Transit Center (Some trips, including all Sunday service ends at Takoma Metro)
G	25 - Maple	Ride On	Takoma Metro Station
G	M60 - New Hampshire Avenue Local	WMATA	Fort Totten Metro Station
G	M6X - New Hampshire Avenue Limited	WMATA	Fort Totten Metro Station
