= Riggs Road station =

Rail station under construction in Maryland, US

Riggs Road
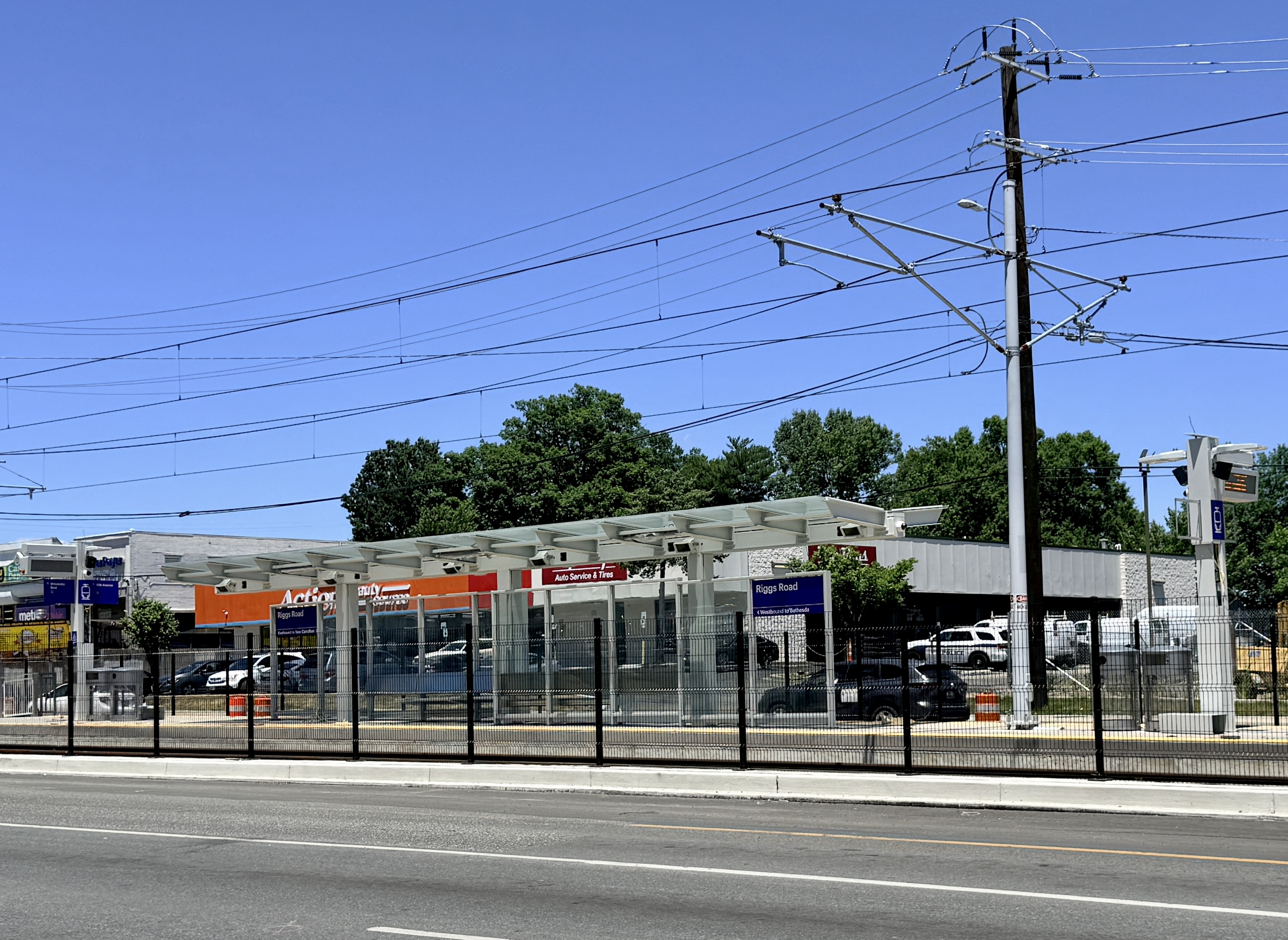
- Station during construction in June 2026

General information
- Location: Langley Park/Hyattsville, Maryland
- Coordinates: 38.98419°N 76.97986°W
- Owner: Maryland Transit Administration
- Platforms: 1 center platform
- Tracks: 2

Construction
- Parking: None
- Accessible: yes

History
- Opening: 2027 (scheduled)

Services
Preceding station	Maryland Transit Administration	Following station
Takoma Langley toward Bethesda	Purple Line	Adelphi Road–UMGC–UMD toward New Carrollton
Location

Riggs Road station is an under-construction light rail station in Prince George's County, Maryland, that will be served by the Purple Line. The station will have a single island platform in the median of University Boulevard just west of Riggs Road. As of 2026, the Purple Line is planned to open in late 2027.<ref name="DC News 2026-09-07"/
