= Adelphi Road–UMGC–UMD station =

Future light rail station in Maryland, US

Adelphi Road–UMGC–UMD
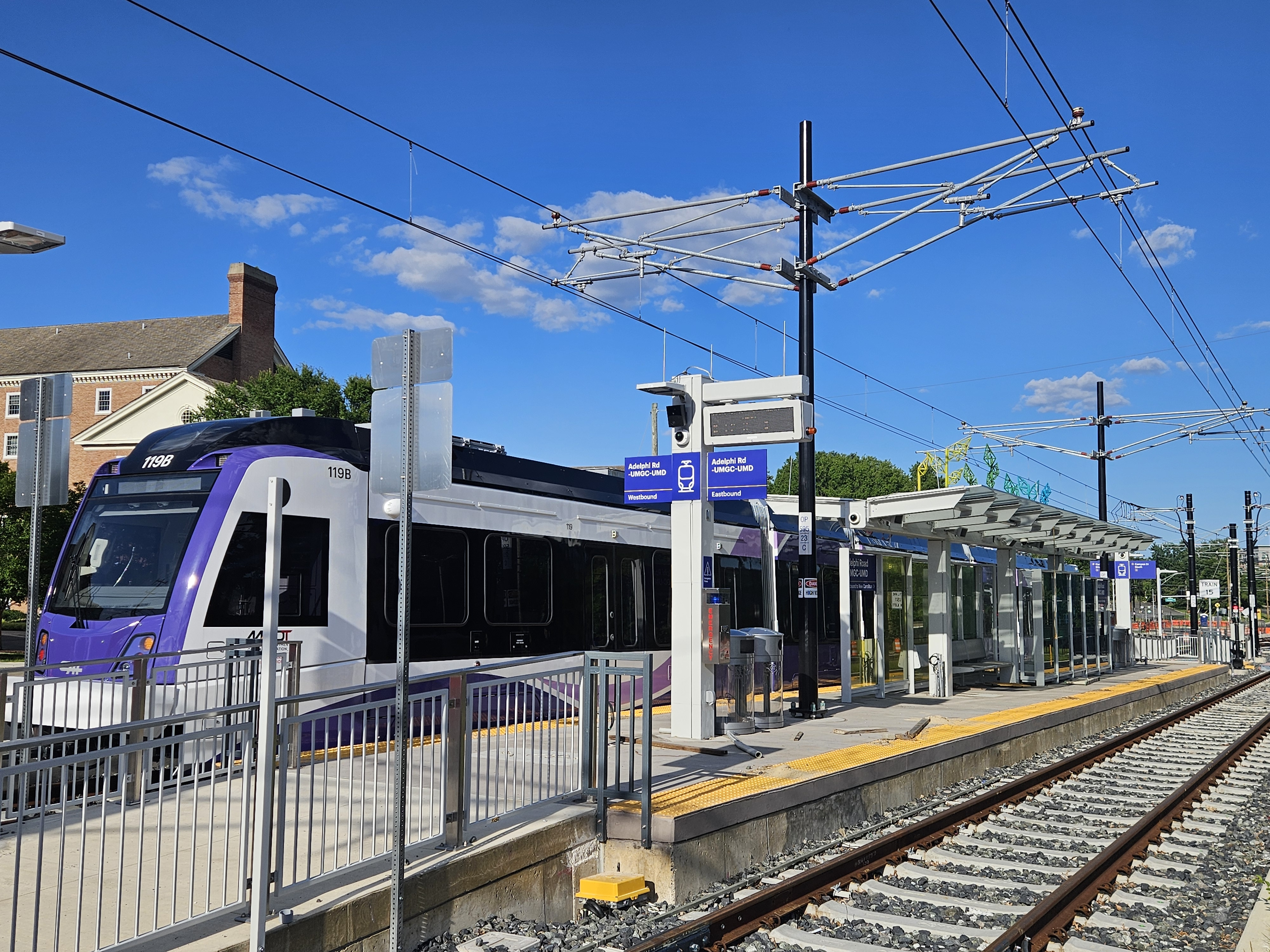
- The station and a test train in June 2026

General information
- Location: 3542-3528 Campus Drive; Adelphi/Hyattsville, Maryland
- Coordinates: 38.985425°N 76.954857°W
- Owner: Maryland Transit Administration
- Platforms: 1 island platform
- Tracks: 2

Construction
- Parking: None
- Accessible: yes

History
- Opening: 2027 (scheduled)

Services
Preceding station	Maryland Transit Administration	Following station
Riggs Road toward Bethesda	Purple Line	Campus Drive–UMD toward New Carrollton
Location

Adelphi Road–UMGC–UMD station is an under-construction light rail station in Prince George's County, Maryland, that will be served by the Purple Line. Named for the adjacent University of Maryland Global Campus (UMGC), it will be one of five stations serving the University of Maryland, College Park (UMD). The station has an island platform in the median of Campus Drive east of Adelphi Road. As of 2026, the Purple Line is planned to open in late 2027.
