= Shuttle–UM =

Transit system at the University of Maryland, College Park

Shuttle-UM

- A Shuttle-UM Gillig Low Floor Plus battery-electric bus in October 2026
- Parent: University of Maryland, College Park (UMD)
- Founded: 1972
- Headquarters: 424 Paint Branch Drive
- Locale: College Park, Maryland; Baltimore, Maryland
- Service area: Prince George's, Montgomery, and Baltimore counties
- Service type: Bus service Demand responsive transport Charter service
- Alliance: University of Maryland, Baltimore (UMB); Universities at Shady Grove (USG)
- Routes: 18
- Hubs: Adele H. Stamp Student Union (UMD); Regents Drive Parking Garage (UMD); Pearl Street Garage (UMB)
- Depots: UMCP Shuttle Facility
- Fleet: Gillig; MCI
- Daily ridership: 3,408 (FY 2025, est.)
- Annual ridership: 1,243,911 (FY 2025)
- Fuel type: Ultra-low-sulfur diesel Diesel-electric; Battery-electric
- Operator: Department of Transportation Services (UMD); Parking and Transportation Services (UMB)
- Website: Official site

Shuttle–UM is a transit system operated by the Department of Transportation Services (DOTS) at the University of Maryland, College Park (UMD). The network provides regular, commuter, night, and demand responsive services to campus and surrounding areas. Shuttle-UM is funded by various student fees and university departments, allowing passengers to ride fare free. The agency expanded to the University of Maryland, Baltimore (UMB) in 2012, which coincided with the relocation of maintenance and administrative operations to an on-campus facility. In FY 2025, the system reported a ridership of 1,243,911 across its fixed-route and demand responsive services.

== History ==
=== 1970s–2000s ===
Shuttle–UM was established in November 1972 by the University of Maryland, College Park's (UMD) Black Student Union as an initiative to promote security for students walking through campus during the evening hours. Operations began with the use of two vans to circulate campus, which were purchased by Student Government Association (SGA), the campus' student governing body, through approval by the Office of Commuter Student Affairs, a campus organization supporting students commuters. The operations were run in the basement of a residence hall on campus and consisted of running the vans on two fixed routes. By Spring 1973, the Residence Hall Association, the governing body for the campus' dormitory halls, donated an additional van which led to three fixed routes running through campus in the evening. By the end of the system's first year of service, 65,000 had been transported. The following year saw the addition of daytime routes to operations to parking lots and the establishment of Call-A-Ride, which was the original first curb-to-curb service for the transit system. In 1975, four Mercedes-Benz vans were purchased to expand the fleet to six vehicles. This same year, the name Shuttle-UM was established, three years after being a service provided by SGA, Shuttle–UM was now an independent entity for UMD. Upon the transit system's independence, Charter service was added to its operations in 1975; the following year saw expansion to the curb-to-curb service with Disability Transit Service for eligible individuals; off-campus routes were established in 1976.

During late 1978, Shuttle–UM's first facility was built on an off-campus parking lot on Greenhouse Road adjacent to Baltimore Avenue. The new facility was known as UMD Building 013 and featured expanded maintenance facilities. Upon 1979, the project that started as a security service expanded to a transit system consisting of 10 routes with over 20 vehicles. Through 1985 and 1988, the Greenhouse facility was expanded to accommodate growing operations with new administrative offices and maintenance facilities. Shuttle–UM's expansion in 1985 also composed of ridership growing to just over 1 million passengers annually and employing 125 student employees that took various positions within the department. By 1986, Shuttle–UM became a member of the American Public Transportation Association and the Transit Association of Maryland. Between 1999 and 2001, facilities were expanded to accommodate an expanding fleet spurred by growing ridership; the administrative offices also underwent a further expansion in 2001 due to said growth.

=== Early 2010s ===
Annual ridership reached 3 million for the first time during the 2011–2012 academic year. In 2012, the construction of a brand new facility was completed on Paint Branch Drive adjacent to the XFINITY Center, which fit into DOTS' mission and goal to become sustainable. The Paint Branch facility features sustainable design elements including a green roof and geothermal climate control. Its construction allowed for the consolidation of various facilities previously spread across multiple locations. In August 2012, operations extended to the University of Maryland, Baltimore (UMB), and featured three routes designed to support campus mobility. These routes, which required a valid university ID, were operated and maintained by the main campus Department of Transportation Services in Baltimore, with primary fleet support based at the Paint Branch facility.

== Fares ==
Shuttle–UM and UM Shuttle are complimentary services via paid student fees and UMD's Student Affairs' funds. Additionally, living complexes and businesses pay the organization to run the service in their area, which allow riders to ride by just showing drivers a university ID, not limited to University of Maryland System schools. Residents of College Park were granted access to Shuttle–UM's services via a program approved by city council in 2010, which granted residents passes to show drivers. In September 2012, the city of Greenbelt passed a similar program to that of College Park allowing passes for its residents to use Shuttle–UM's services.

== Governance ==
Shuttle–UM, although as separate entity in the beginning, is now a branch of DOTS, along with Campus Parking Enforcement. Both are housed at the Paint Branch facility; however, customer inquires regarding parking operate out of Regents Drive Garage offices. The department is overseen by the senior director, who delegates planning and oversee activity of every branch of the agency.

== Routes ==
The Shuttle–UM transit system primarily operates circulator routes that start and end on the UMCP campus. As of January 2022, there are 19 routes operated by Shuttle–UM, two of which are operated by a subcontractor. The system's bus routes utilize three bus terminals: Adele H. Stamp Student Union, Regents Drive Parking Ramp, and the College Park–University of Maryland station.

Route	Terminals			Via	Notes
104; College Park Metro Station
104; College Park Metro Station	Commuter service				
104; College Park Metro Station	Regents Drive Garage	↔	College Park–UMD Station Camden Line	Paint Branch Parkway, River Road	
105; The Courtyards
105; The Courtyards	Commuter service				
105; The Courtyards	Regents Drive Garage	↔	The Courtyards at UMD Apartments; Building #500	Metzerott Road, Greenmeade Drive, Boteler Lane	Operates Weekdays
108; Adelphi
108; Adelphi	Commuter service				
108; Adelphi	Adele H. Stamp Student Union; Slip at Campus Drive	↔	Adelphi; The Chateau Apartments at Mount Pisgah Road	Metzerott Road, New Hampshire Avenue	Operates weekdays
109; River Road
109; River Road	Special service				
109; River Road	College Park–UMD Station Camden Line	↔	M-Square Research Park	River Road	Operates weekday peak service
110; Seven Springs Apartments
110; Seven Springs Apartments	Commuter service				
110; Seven Springs Apartments	Adele H. Stamp Student Union; Slip at Campus Drive	↔	Seven Springs Apartments	University Boulevard, Rhode Island Avenue, Baltimore Avenue...	Operates weekdays
111; Silver Spring
111; Silver Spring	Commuter service				
111; Silver Spring	Adele H. Stamp Student Union; Lot HH at Campus Drive	↔	Silver Spring; Takoma Park; Silver Spring Metro Station	Outbound: University Boulevard, Carroll Avenue, Flower Avenue...; Inbound: Wayne Avenue, Flower Avenue, Carroll Avenue...	Operates weekdays
113; Hyattsville
113; Hyattsville	Commuter service				
113; Hyattsville	Adele H. Stamp Student Union; Slip at Campus Drive	↔	Hyattsville; Hyattsville Crossing Metro Station	Outbound: Adelphi Road, Belcrest Road, Queensbury Road,...; Inbound: Baltimore Avenue, Queensbury Road, Belcrest Road,...	Operates weekdays
114; University View
114; University View	Commuter service				
114; University View	Adele H. Stamp Student Union; Lot HH at Campus Drive	↔	University View Apartments	Outbound: Campus Drive, Knox Road, Baltimore Avenue; Inbound: Baltimore Avenue	Operates Weekdays
115; Orange
115; Orange	Evening service				
115; Orange	Adele H. Stamp Student Union; Slip at Campus Drive	↔	North Campus; Downtown College park	Loop: Campus Drive, Regents Drive, Baltimore Avenue	Operates Fridays and weekends with extended overnight hours Friday-Saturday.
116; Purple
116; Purple	Evening service				
116; Purple	Adele H. Stamp Student Union; Lot HH at Campus Drive	↔	The Courtyards at UMD Apartments; Downtown College Park	Loop: Campus Drive, Regents Drive, University Boulevard, Metzerott Road,...	Operates Fridays and weekends with extended overnight hours Friday-Saturday.
117; Blue
117; Blue	Evening service				
117; Blue	Adele H. Stamp Student Union; Lot HH at Campus Drive	↔	Downtown College Park; Uptown College Park	Loop: Campus Drive, Mowatt Lane, Knox Road, Baltimore Avenue,...	Operates Fridays and weekends with extended overnight hours Friday-Saturday.
118; Gold
118; Gold	Evening service				
118; Gold	Adele H. Stamp Student Union; Slip at Campus Drive	↔	South Campus; North Campus; Graduate Housing; Downtown College Park	Loop: Campus Drive, Preinkert Drive, University Boulevard,...	Operates Fridays and weekends with extended overnight hours Friday-Saturday.
122; Green
122; Green	Evening service				
122; Green	Adele H. Stamp Student Union; Slip at Campus Drive	↔	South Campus; Graham Cracker (Sorority Housing); Fraternity Row; Downtown College Park; North Campus	Loop: Campus Drive, Preinkert Drive, Knox Road,...	Operates Fridays and weekends with extended overnight hours Friday-Saturday.
124; The Universities at Shady Grove
124; The Universities at Shady Grove	Commuter Service				
124; The Universities at Shady Grove	Adele H. Stamp Student Union; Slip at Campus Drive	↔	Universities at Shady Grove	Outbound: Campus Drive, New Hampshire Avenue, Interstate 95,...; Inbound: Interstate 95, Baltimore Avenue, Campus Drive,...	Operates weekday express bus service
125; Circulator
125; Circulator	Commuter Service				
125; Circulator	Adele H. Stamp Student Union; Slip at Campus Drive	↔	Graduate Housing; Downtown College Park; Uptown College Park; Xfinity Center	Loop: Campus Drive, Guildford Drive, Baltimore Avenue,...	Operates weekdays
126; New Carrollton
126; New Carrollton	Commuter Service				
126; New Carrollton	Adele H. Stamp Student Union; Slip at Campus Drive	↔	New Carrollton; New Carrollton Station Penn Line	Campus Drive, Baltimore Avenue, Maryland Route 410...	Operates weekdays
127; Mazza GrandMarc
127; Mazza GrandMarc	Commuter Service				
127; Mazza GrandMarc	Regents Drive Garage	↔	Mazza GrandMarc Apartments	Baltimore Avenue, Paint Branch Drive...	Operates weekdays
128; The Enclave
128; The Enclave	Commuter Service				
128; The Enclave	Adele H. Stamp Student Union; Slip at Campus Drive	↔	The Enclave Apartments	Outbound: Campus Drive, University Boulevard...; Inbound: Baltimore Avenue, Paint Branch Drive...	Operates weekdays
129; Franklin Park at Greenbelt Station
129; Franklin Park at Greenbelt Station	Commuter Service				
129; Franklin Park at Greenbelt Station	Regents Drive Garage	↔	Franklin Park Apartments at Greenbelt Station; Greenbelt Station Camden Line	Outbound: Paint Branch Parkway, Kenilworth Avenue, Edmonston Road...; Inbound: Cherrywood Lane, Pontiact Street, Edmonston Road...	Operates weekdays during summer break
130; Greenbelt
130; Greenbelt	Commuter Service				
130; Greenbelt	Adele H. Stamp Student Union; Campus Drive at Slip	↔	Greenbelt; NASA Goddard Space Flight Center	Outbound: Greenbelt Road; Inbound: Ridge Road, Kenilworth Avenue...	Operates weekdays
131; The Enclave and Mazza GrandMarc
131; The Enclave and Mazza GrandMarc	Evening Service				
131; The Enclave and Mazza GrandMarc	Adele H. Stamp Student Union; Campus Drive at Lot HH	↔	Downtown College Park; Mazza GrandMarc Apartments; The Enclave Apartments	Baltimore Avenue	Operates Thursday–Saturday.
132; The Varsity
132; The Varsity	Commuter service				
132; The Varsity	Adele H. Stamp Student Union; Lot HH at Campus Drive	↔	The Varsity Apartments	Outbound: Campus Drive, Knox Road, Baltimore Avenue; Inbound: Baltimore Avenue, Campus Drive	Operates weekdays
133; The Mall at Prince George's
133; The Mall at Prince George's	Weekend service				
133; The Mall at Prince George's	Adele H. Stamp Student Union; Slip at Campus Drive	↔	The Mall at Prince George's; Hyattsville Crossing Metro Station	Baltimore Avenue, Adelphi Road, Belcrest Road...	Operates on Saturdays
134; Mazza GrandMarc and Seven Springs Apartments
134; Mazza GrandMarc and Seven Springs Apartments	Commuter service				
134; Mazza GrandMarc and Seven Springs Apartments	Regents Drive Garage	↔	Seven Springs Apartments; Mazza GrandMarc Apartments	Outbound: Campus Drive, Baltimore Avenue, Rhode Island Avenue...; Inbound: Baltimore Avenue, Paint Branch Drive, Stadium Drive	Operates weekdays during summer break
135; University Connector
135; University Connector	Commuter Service				
135; University Connector	Regents Drive Garage	↔	Graduate Housing; Downtown College Park; Uptown College Park; The Courtyards at UMD Apartments	Loop: Campus Drive, Baltimore Avenue, Guilford Drive ...	Operates weekdays
136; Indigo
136; Indigo	Evening service				
136; Indigo	Adele H. Stamp Student Union; Campus Drive at Lot HH	↔	The Courtyards at UMD; Graduate Housing; Downtown College Park; Uptown College Park	Loop: Regents Drive, University Boulevard, Guilford Drive...	Operates weekends during summer break

== Fleet ==
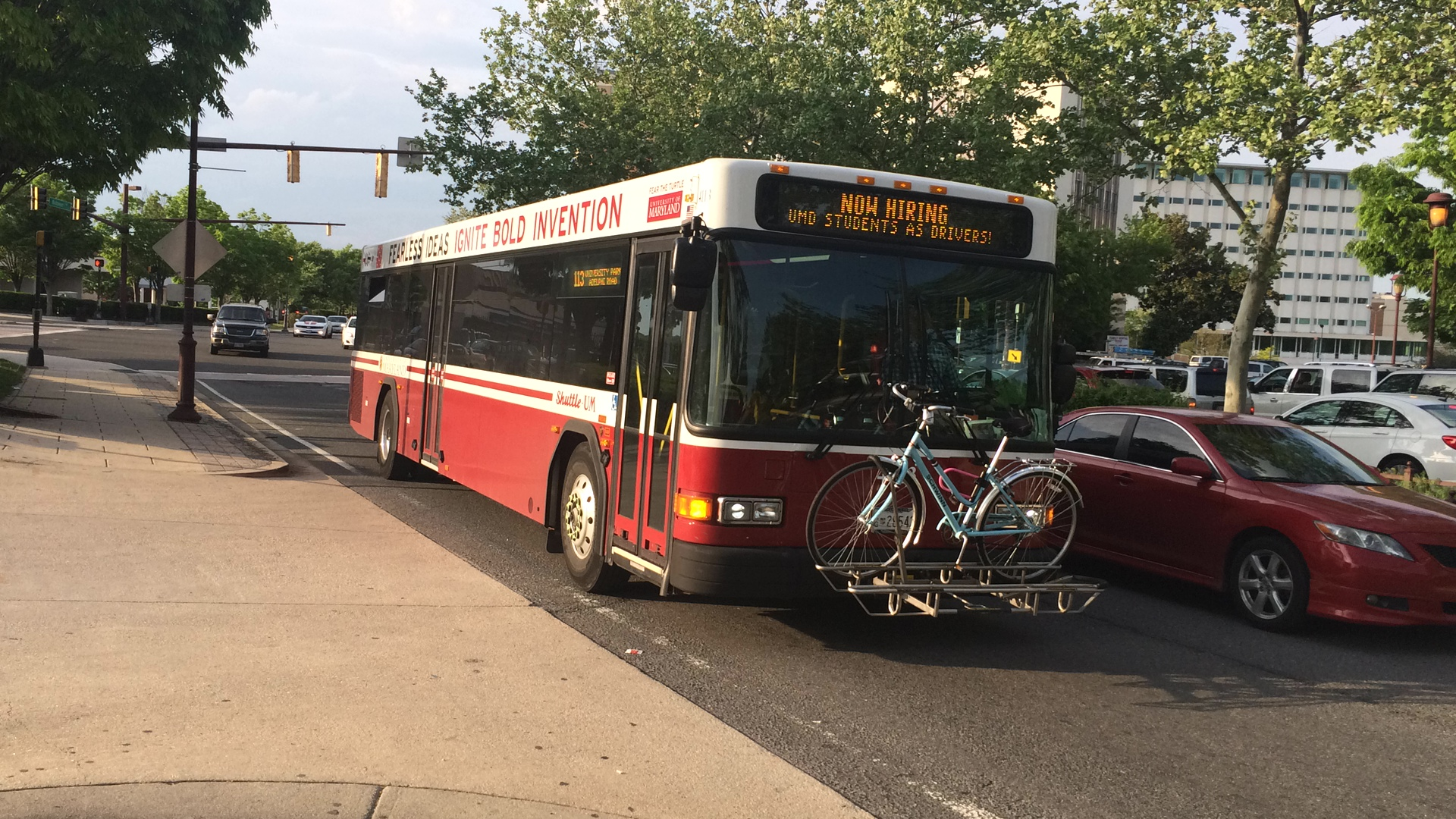
Shuttle UM Gillig Advantage at Prince George's Plaza

Shuttle-UM owns over 70 vehicles in its fleet.

Delivered	Make	Model
2005-2017	Gillig	Low Floor 35'
2010-2019	Gillig	Low Floor 40'
2016-2017	Gillig	Low Floor 29'
2017-2020	MCI	J4500
