= List of Metrobus routes in Maryland =

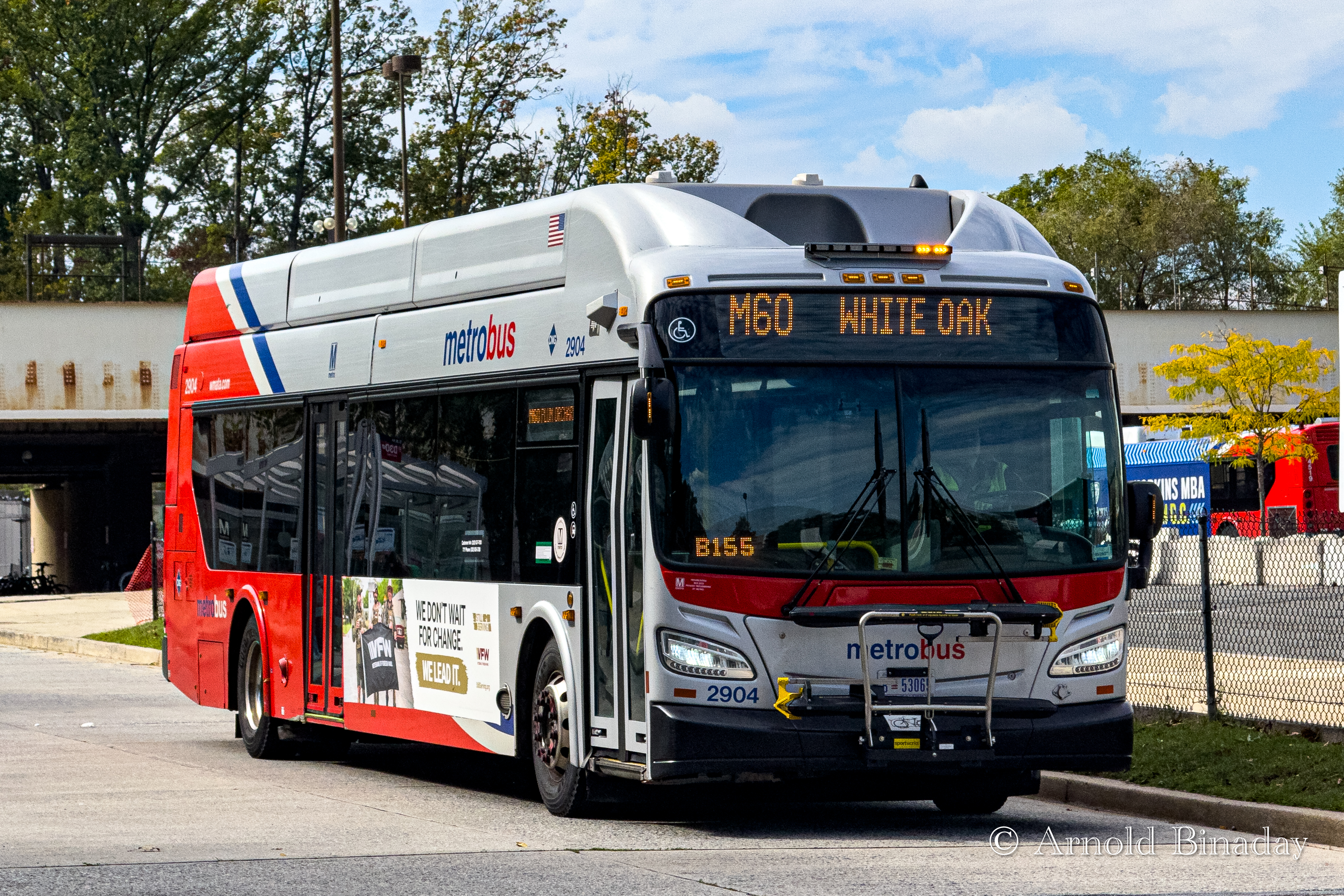
Route M60 at Fort Totten station

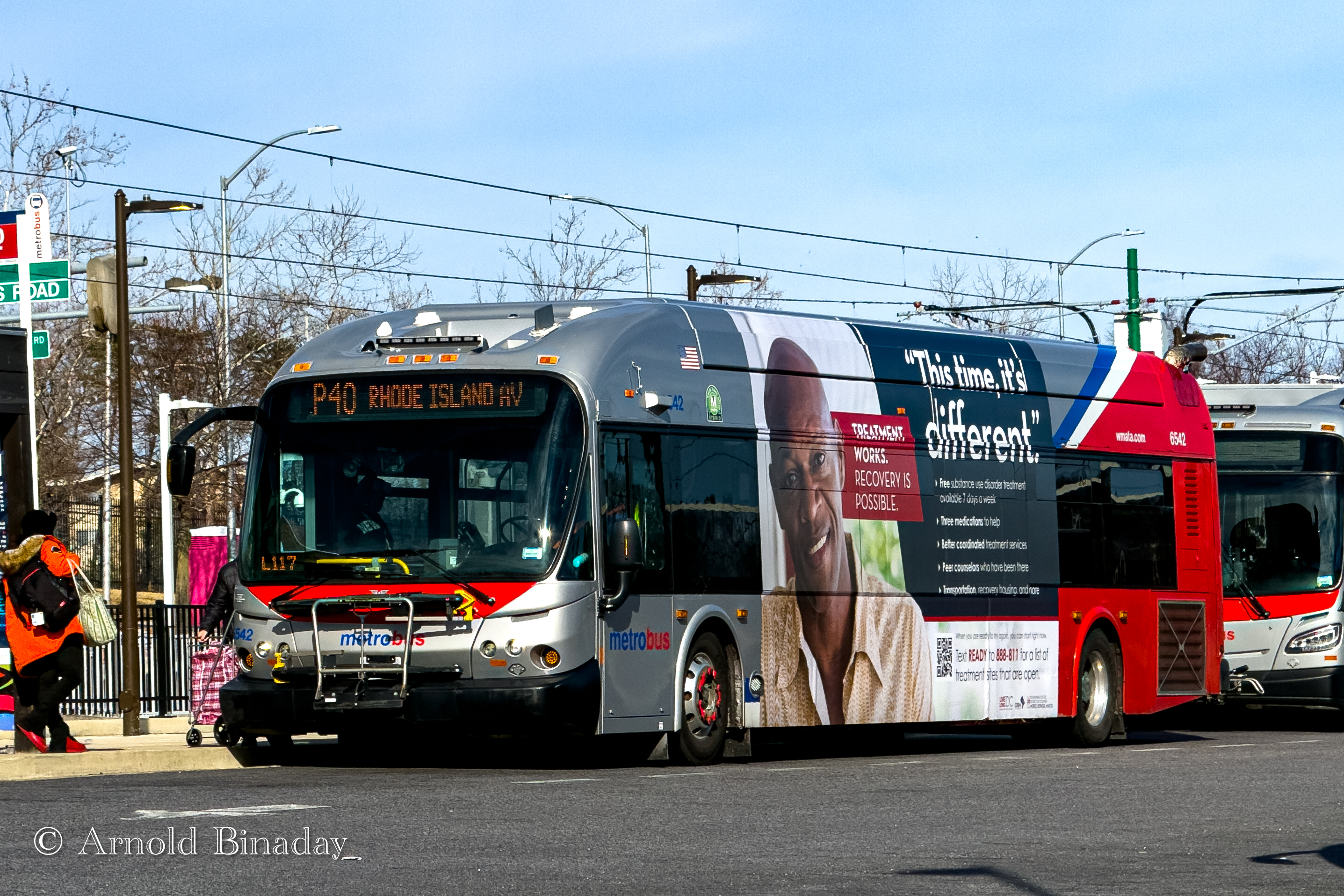
Route P40 at New Carrollton station

This is a list of bus routes operated by the Washington Metropolitan Area Transit Authority (WMATA), branded as Metrobus in Montgomery County and Prince George's County in Maryland. Most of the routes operated under Streetcars in Washington, D.C. and Maryland prior to the 1960s.

== Numbering ==
Most Metrobus routes in MD were formerly designated with a letter followed by a number, but some routes had double-digit numbers. The routes in Prince George's County would typically have a letter followed by two numbers.

Odd-numbered routes were typically part-time variants of even-numbered routes. At one time, odd-numbered routes were express routes, but that distinction was later abandoned. Most odd-numbered routes operated during rush hours and/or with limited bus stops that had a few of them running into the off-peak hours.

As of WMATA's Better Bus Redesign beginning on June 29, 2025, all the routes entirely within Maryland begin with an "M" and a "P."

== History ==
Many current routes operate under former streetcar routes. The Streetcars provided the main transportation in the Maryland area from the 1800s to the 1960s. Two separate companies, the Washington, Virginia, and Maryland Coach Company (WV&M), and the Washington Marlboro and Annapolis Motor Lines (WM&A), would also operate on the former streetcar routes and provide service to parts of MD when the Streetcars ended service. In 1973, WMATA acquired the two bus companies along with other bus companies to form its current Metrobus system. At one point, most MD routes would enter into Downtown before Metro was built in which all buses would terminate at stations in various locations. Today, the main MD hub is at Silver Spring Metro station.

When Ride On began service, most Metrobus routes in Montgomery County were slowly transferred into Ride On routes through the years as it would be cheaper to operate under another carrier. The same thing went with TheBus.

Due to the COVID-19 pandemic, the Metrobus service was mostly reduced to Sunday service schedules during the weekdays with selected routes suspended from March 18 to August 22, 2020. Routes 83, A12, C4, D12, F4, J2, K6, P12, T18, Y2, and Z8 were the only routes that ran during the weekends with the rest of the routes suspended. Beginning on August 23, 2020, more routes came back during the weekdays and weekends returning the Metrobus service to 75%. Most service and routes resumed on September 5, 2021 with WMATA introducing a brand new 12-to-20 Minute Frequent Network to select routes. Routes C2/C4, F4, J2, K6, P12, and T18 were added to the 12 Minute Frequent Network and Routes A12, D12, Q1/Q2/Q4/Q5/Q6, Y2/Y7/Y8, and Z6/Z8 were added to the 20 Minute Frequent Network. Route L12 was added to the 20 Minute Frequent Network while Routes Q1 and Q5 were eliminated beginning on June 25, 2023.

On November 21, 2024, WMATA approved its Better Bus Network Redesign plan, which began development in 2022. Under the plan, all the routes would be renamed with easier-to-understand route designations, and would modify most of its existing routes to make the bus system easier to use, faster, and more reliable. The Better Bus Network Redesign was implemented on June 29, 2025, with all the Maryland routes being renamed with an "M" for the Montgomery County routes and a "P" for the Prince George's County routes. The routes that primarily serve Washington, DC have bus stops in Maryland and were renamed with a "C" for crosstown and a "D" for downtown.

== Routes ==
Most of the Maryland buses remain inside of Prince George's County and Montgomery County. However, a few routes enter into Washington DC, which were a part of their former streetcar lines. Only one current route (P90) operates between Maryland and Virginia.

=== Montgomery County routes ===
Route	Terminals			Streets traveled	Service notes	Divisions
M12; University Boulevard	Wheaton; Twinbrook	↔	Takoma Langley Crossroads Transit Center; Hyattsville Crossing	University Blvd; Riggs Rd; East-West Hwy	Part of 12-minute frequent service network; Additional trips operate between Wheaton and Takoma Langley Crossroads Transit Center	Montgomery
M20; Wheaton–Silver Spring	ICC Park & Ride (weekdays only); Wheaton (late night and weekends)	↔	Silver Spring (Paul S. Sarbanes Transit Center)	Georgia Av	Part of 12-minute frequent service network between Silver Spring and Wheaton stations; Late night weekday and all weekend service operates between Wheaton and Silver Spring	Montgomery
M22; Olney–Bethesda	MedStar Montgomery Medical Center	↔	Wheaton (late night); Bethesda	Connecticut Av; Georgia Av	Late night service operates between MedStar Montgomery Medical Center and Wheaton	Montgomery
M42; Randolph Rd–College Park	North Bethesda	↔	College Park	Randolph Rd; New Hampshire Av; U.S. Route 1; Baltimore Av		Montgomery
M44; Randolph Rd–Hyattsville Crossing	North Bethesda	↔	Hyattsville Crossing	Randolph Rd; Powder Mill Rd; U.S. Route 1; Baltimore Av		Montgomery
M52; Colesville Rd–Burtonsville	South Laurel Park & Ride (peak hours); Burtonsville Park & Ride (off-peak & weekends)	↔	Silver Spring (Paul S. Sarbanes Transit Center)	Cherry Ln; Sandy Spring Rd; Old Columbia Pike; Columbia Pike; Lockwood Dr; Colesville Rd	Part of 20-minute frequent service network; Weekday peak-hour service is extended to Laurel.	Montgomery
M54; Colesville Rd–Greencastle	Greencastle Park & Ride	↔	Silver Spring (Paul S. Sarbanes Transit Center)	Briggs Chaney Rd; Old Columbia Pike; Lockwood Dr; Colesville Rd	Part of 20-minute frequent service network	Montgomery
M60; New Hampshire Av	White Oak Medical Center (Plum Orchard Dr & Healing Way)	↔	Fort Totten	New Hampshire Av	Part of 12-minute frequent service network	Bladensburg
M6X; New Hampshire Av Limited	Hillandale (FDA)	↔	Fort Totten	New Hampshire Av	Weekday peak service only	Montgomery
M70; East West Hwy	Montgomery Mall Transit Center	↔	Silver Spring (Paul S. Sarbanes Transit Center)	Old Georgetown Rd; East-West Hwy	Part of 12-minute frequent service network	Montgomery
M82; River Rd–Falls Rd	Rockville	↔	Friendship Heights	Falls Rd; River Rd		Montgomery

==== Route history ====
Route	History
M12	Existing routing of the former route C4.
M20	Existing routing of the former route Y7.
M22	A combination of the former routes Y2 and Y8 between Wheaton station and Olney and the former route L8 between Kensington and Chevy Chase.
M42	A combination of the former route 83 between College Park station and Cherry Hill, and the former route C8 between North Bethesda station and Adventist Healthcare White Oak Medical Center.
M44	A combination of the former route 86 between Hyattsville Crossing station and Calverton, and the former route C8 between North Bethesda station and Adventist Healthcare White Oak Medical Center.
M52	A combination of the former routes Z6 and Z7.
M54	Existing routing of the former route Z8 with the service to Briggs Chaney Park & Ride and Castle Boulevard being eliminated.
M60	Existing routing of the former route K6 with an extension to Adventist Healthcare White Oak Medical Center via Columbia Pike.
M6X	Existing routing of the former route K9.
M70	Existing routing of the former route J2.
M82	Existing routing of the former route T2.

=== Prince George's County routes ===
Route	Terminals			Streets traveled	Service notes	Divisions
P10; Baltimore Av	Rhode Island Avenue	↔	College Park	U.S. Route 1; Baltimore Av; Rhode Island Av NE		Landover
P12; Laurel–Greenbelt	South Laurel Park & Ride	↔	Greenbelt	Cherrywood Ln; Kenilworth Av; Edmonston Rd; U.S. Route 1; Baltimore Av		Landover
P14; Kenilworth Av	Deanwood	↔	Greenbelt	Kenilworth Av; Edmonston Rd		Landover
P15; Riggs Rd–Adelphi	Adelphi (Riggs Rd & Edwards Way)	↔	Fort Totten	Riggs Rd; 23rd Av	Weekday peak service only (AM to Fort Totten, PM to Adelphi)	Bladensburg
P16; Riggs Rd–White Oak	White Oak Medical Center (Plum Orchard Dr & Healing Way)	↔	Fort Totten	Riggs Rd; 23rd Av		Bladensburg
P1X; Baltimore Av Limited	Rhode Island Avenue	↔	IKEA Way (College Park)	U.S. Route 1; Baltimore Av; Rhode Island Av NE	Part of 20-minute frequent service network	Landover
P20; Greenbelt Rd–New Carrollton	Greenbelt	↔	New Carrollton	Greenbelt Rd; Lanham-Severn Rd; Annapolis Rd		Landover
P21; Hanover Pkwy–New Carrollton	Greenbelt	↔	New Carrollton	Greenbelt Rd; Hanover Pkwy; Princess Garden Pkwy; Annapolis Rd		Landover
P24; Good Luck Rd	Bowie State University; Goddard Corporate Park (Mission Dr)	↔	New Carrollton	Good Luck Rd; Cipriano Rd; Lanham-Severn Rd	Late night and Sunday service operates between New Carrollton and Goddard Corporate Park only	Landover
P30; New Carrollton–Silver Spring	Silver Spring (Paul S. Sarbanes Transit Center)	↔	New Carrollton	East-West Hwy; Philadelphia Av; Riverdale Rd; Queensbury Rd	Part of 12-minute frequent service network	Landover
P31; New Carrollton–Takoma Langley	Takoma Langley Crossroads Transit Center	↔	New Carrollton	University Blvd; Finns Lane; Riverdale Road		Landover
P32; Greenbelt–Fort Totten	Greenbelt	↔	Fort Totten	Adelphi Rd; Ager Rd; Chillum Rd; Greenbelt Rd; Sargent Rd		Landover
P33; Queens Chapel Rd	Highview Apartments	↔	Brookland	Queens Chapel Rd; Michigan Av NE		Landover
P35; New Carrollton–Fort Totten	New Carrollton	↔	Fort Totten	Good Luck Rd; Finns Ln; Riverdale Rd; East-West Hwy; Sargent Rd	Weekday service only	Landover
P40; Annapolis Rd	New Carrollton	↔	Rhode Island Avenue	Annapolis Rd; Rhode Island Av NE	Part of 12-minute frequent service network	Landover
P41; Landover Rd	Capital Plaza	↔	Downtown Largo	Landover Rd	Part of 20-minute frequent service network	Landover
P42; Chillum Rd–New Carrollton	New Carrollton	↔	Takoma	Chillum Rd; Riverdale Rd; Edmonston Rd		Landover
P60; MLK Hwy–Suitland	New Carrollton	↔	Suitland	Martin Luther King Jr Hwy; Addison Rd; Silver Hill Rd	Part of 12-minute frequent service network	Landover
P61; Glenarden–Suitland	New Carrollton	↔	Suitland	Brightseat Rd; Walker Mill Rd; Marlboro Pike		Landover
P62; Deanwood–Branch Av	Deanwood	↔	Branch Avenue	Addison Rd; Walker Mill Rd; Central Av; Forestville Rd; Allentown Rd		Landover
P63; Central Av–Naylor Rd	Downtown Largo	↔	Naylor Road	Central Av; Larchmont Av; Southern Av		Landover
P66; Forestville–Suitland	Forestville (8411 Old Marlboro Pike)	↔	Suitland	Silver Hill Rd; Pennsylvania Av	Select weekday peak service ends/begins at Penn Mar Shopping Center	Andrews Federal Center
P72; Central Av–Bowie	Downtown Largo	↔	Bowie Park & Ride	Central Av; Mitchellville Rd		Landover
P73; Central Av–Trade Zone	Downtown Largo	↔	Collington Center	Central Av	Weekday service only	Landover
P87; Brinkley Rd	Suitland	↔	Oxon Hill Park & Ride	Allentown Rd; Brinkley Rd; Suitland Rd; Oxon Hill Rd		Andrews Federal Center
P90; St Barnabas Rd	Suitland	↔	Oxon Hill Park & Ride; King Street–Old Town	St. Barnabas Rd; Oxon Hill Rd; Monument Av/MGM National Av; I-495	Part of 20-minute frequent service network; Weekday trips alternate ending at Oxon Hill and King Street–Old Town	Andrews Federal Center
P93; Suitland–Birchwood	Suitland	↔	Birchwood City	Silver Hill Rd; Iverson St; Wheeler Rd; Southern Av; Livingston Rd	Part of 12-minute frequent service network alongside route P94	Andrews Federal Center
P94; Suitland–National Harbor	Suitland	↔	National Harbor (St. George Blvd & Waterfront St)	Silver Hill Rd; Iverson St; Wheeler Rd; Southern Av SE; Livingston Rd; Monument Av/MGM National Av	Part of 12-minute frequent service network alongside route P93	Andrews Federal Center
P96; Suitland–Oxon Hill	Suitland	↔	Oxon Hill Park & Ride	Oxon Hill Rd		Andrews Federal Center
P97; Southern Av–Ft Washington	Fort Washington Park & Ride	↔	Southern Avenue	Fort Washington Rd; Fort Foote Rd; Oxon Hill Rd; Southern Av	Weekday service only	Shepherd Parkway

==== Route history ====
Route	History
P10	Modified routing of the former route 86 with service to Calverton being replaced by route M44.
P12	Existing routing of the former route 89M with new weekend service added.
P14	Modified routing of the former route R12 with service that serves the Berwyn Heights neighborhood instead of Beltway Plaza.; This route now operates on Sundays.
P15	Modified routing of the former route R1 with service being rerouted through the Lewisdale neighborhood.
P16	Modified routing of the former route R2.
P1X	Modified routing of the former routes 83 and 86 with service to the College Park station being replaced by route P10 and to Cherry Hill and Calverton being replaced by routes M42 and M44 respectively.
P20	Modified routing of the former route G14 with service running along Lanham-Severn Road instead of Good Luck Road.
P21	Existing routing of the former route G12.
P24	Modified routing of the former route B27 with service running along Good Luck Road and serving Goddard Corporate Park instead of continuing on Lanham-Severn Road.
P30	Existing routing of the former route F4.
P31	A combination of the former route C2 between the Takoma Langley Crossroads Transit Center and the University of Maryland, and a modified routing of route F6 between College Park and New Carrollton stations.
P32	A combination of the former route C2 between Greenbelt and the University of Maryland, route F6 between the University of Maryland and Hyattsville Crossing station, routes 13 and 19 of TheBus between Hyattsville Crossing and West Hyattsville stations, and a modified routing of route F6 between Hyattsville Crossing and Fort Totten stations via Chillum Road.
P33	Existing routing of the former route R4.
P35	A combination of the former route F6 between New Carrollton station and Riverdale via Kenilworth Avenue, the former route F4 between Riverdale and East-West Highway & Riggs Road, then existing routing of the former route F6 between Riggs Road and Fort Totten Metro station.
P40	Existing routing of the former route T18.
P41	Existing routing of the former route L12 with service to the former Prince George's Hospital being eliminated.
P42	A combination of a modified route F1 between Takoma station and Mount Rainier, and the former route T14 routing between Mount Rainier and New Carrollton station with new service through Fort Lincoln.
P60	A combination of a modified route A12 with service through Palmer Park and Glenarden being replaced by routes P41 and P61 respectively, and the former route P12 between Addison Road and Suitland station.
P61	A combination of routes F14 between New Carrollton station and Northwest stadium, and V12 between Central Avenue and Suitland station with new service along Morgan Boulevard and via Morgan Boulevard station.
P62	A combination of route K12 between Branch Avenue station and Penn Mar Shopping Center, and the existing routing of the former route V14.
P63	A combination of the former routes C21, C22, C29 between Largo and Addison Road station via Morgan Boulevard station, and the former route F14 between Addison Road and Naylor Road stations.
P66	A combination of former routes J12 between Forestville and the Penn Mar Shopping Center, and K12 between the Penn Mar Shopping Center and Suitland station.
P72	Existing routing of the former routes C26 and C29 with service to Addison Road station being replaced by route P63 and Saturday service to Bowie State University being eliminated.
P73	A combination routing of the former routes C21 and C22 with service to Addison Road station being replaced by route P63.
P87	Modified routing of the former route D14 with service to Southern Avenue station being eliminated.
P90	A combination routing of the former route D12 between Suitland station and Oxon Hill Road, the former route NH1 between Oxon Hill Road and National Harbor, and the full route NH2.
P93	A combination routing of the former route P12 between Suitland station and Eastover Shopping Center and the former route D12 to Birchwood City
P94	A combination routing of the former route P12 between Suitland station and Eastover Shopping Center and the former route NH1 to National Harbor.
P96	A combination routing of the former routes D12, D14, and H12.
P97	Existing routing of the former route P18.

== Former routes ==
=== Routes eliminated due to the Better Bus Redesign Network ===
All the routes listed below were eliminated and renamed into an "M" and a "P" designation on June 29, 2025.

Route	Terminals			Streets traveled	Service notes
83, 86; College Park Line	Rhode Island Avenue–Brentwood Metro station	↔	83 Cherry Hill Park Campground; 86 Calverton (4061 Center Park Roadway)	U.S. Route 1; Baltimore Avenue; Rhode Island Ave	83 was renamed into the P1X with service to Cherry Hill replaced by Route M42.; 86 was renamed into the P10 with service to Calverton replaced by Route M44.
89M; Laurel Line	South Laurel Park & Ride Lot	↔	Greenbelt Metro station	Cherrywood Lane; Kenilworth Avenue; Edmonston Road; Baltimore Avenue	Renamed into the P12.
A12; Martin Luther King Jr. Highway Line	New Carrollton station (East Side)	↔	Addison Road Metro station (Monday-Saturday); Capitol Heights Metro station (Sundays Only)	Martin Luther King Jr Highway; Addison Road	Combined with the P12 between Addison Road and Suitland and renamed into the P60.
B21, B22; Bowie State University Line	Bowie State University	↔	New Carrollton Metro station (the east side)	Laurel-Bowie Road; John Hanson Highway	Transferred to TheBus and renamed into the P71.
B24; Bowie-Belair Line	Bowie Park & Ride Lot	↔	New Carrollton Metro station (the west side)	Annapolis Road	Combined with the F13 and transferred to TheBus and renamed into the P23.
B27; Bowie–New Carrollton Line	Bowie State University	↔	New Carrollton Metro station (the west side)	Lanham-Severn Road	Renamed into the P22.
C2, C4; Greenbelt–Twinbrook Line	C2 Wheaton Metro station; C4 Twinbrook Metro station (The east side)	↔	C2 Greenbelt Metro station; C4 Hyattsville Crossing Metro station	University Boulevard; Greenbelt Road (C2); Baltimore Avenue (C2); Riggs Road (C4); East-West Highway (C4)	C2 discontinued and combined with the F6 into routes P31 and P32.; C4 renamed into the M12.
C8; College Park–North Bethesda Line	North Bethesda Metro station	↔	College Park–University of Maryland station	Randolph Road; New Hampshire Avenue; Adelphi Road	Combined with routes 83 and 86 and renamed into the M42 and M44.
C11, C13; Clinton Line	Clinton Park & Ride Lot	↔	Branch Avenue Metro station	Branch Avenue	Discontinued with no replacement service.
C12, C14; Hillcrest Heights Line	Naylor Road Metro station	↔	Branch Avenue Metro station	Branch Avenue; Old Branch Avenue; Iverson Street (C12)	C12 combined with TheBus 34, and transferred to TheBus and renamed into Route P83.
C21, C22, C26, C29; Central Avenue Line	C21, C22 Collington Center; C26 Bowie Park & Ride Lot; C29 Bowie State University (Saturdays only); C29 Pointer Ridge (Hall Road & Central Ave) (Sundays only)	↔	C21, C22, C29 Addison Road station; C26 Downtown Largo station	Central Avenue	C21 and C22 combined with the F14 and renamed into the P63 and P73.; C26 and C29 combined and renamed into the P72.
C27; Central Avenue Line	Pointer Ridge (Hall Road & Central Ave)	↔	Addison Road Metro station	Central Avenue	Discontinued and replaced by Routes P63, P72, and P73.
D12; Southern Ave–Suitland Line	Suitland Metro station	↔	Southern Avenue Metro station	St. Barnabas Road	Discontinued and combined with the P12 and NH2 and renamed into the P90 and P93.
D14; Oxon Hill–Suitland Line	Suitland Metro station	↔	Southern Avenue Metro station	Brinkley Road; Allentown Road; Indian Head Highway; Oxon Hill Road	Modified and renamed into the P87 and P96.
F1; Chillum Road Line	Takoma Metro station	↔	Cheverly Metro station	Chillum Road; Eastern Avenue; Landover Road	Combined with the T14 and renamed into the P42.
F4; New Carrollton–Silver Spring Line	Silver Spring Metro station (Paul S. Sarbanes Transit Center)	↔	New Carrollton Metro station (the west Side)	East-West Highway; Philadelphia Avenue; Riverdale Road; Queensbury Road	Renamed into the P30.
F6; New Carrollton–Fort Totten Line	Fort Totten Metro station	↔	New Carrollton Metro station (the west Side)	East-West Highway; Sargent Road	Discontinued and combined with the C2 and renamed into the P31, P32, and P35.
F8; Langley Park–Cheverly Line	Takoma Langley Crossroads Transit Center	↔	Cheverly Metro station	University Boulevard; Adelphi Road; Baltimore Avenue; Landover Road	Discontinued and replaced by TheBus Route P43.
F12; Ardwick Industrial Park Shuttle Line	New Carrollton Metro station (the east side)	↔	Cheverly Metro station	Pennsy Drive; Landover Road; Martin Luther King Highway	Transferred to TheBus.
F13; Cheverly Metro station–Washington Business Park Line	Washington Business Park (Forbes Blvd & Senate Drive)	↔	Cheverly Metro station	Annapolis Road; Whitfield Chapel Road; Martin Luther King Jr. Highway	Split into two routes and transferred to TheBus as Route P22 (between Cheverly and New Carrollton), and Route P23 (between New Carrollton and Washington Business Park and combined with Route B24 to Fairwood).
F14; Sheriff Road–Capitol Heights Line	New Carrollton Metro station (the east side)	↔	Naylor Road Metro station	Sheriff Road; Martin Luther King Jr Highway; Larchmont Avenue; Southern Avenue	Combined with the C21, C22, C29, and V12 and renamed into the P61 and P63.
G12; Greenbelt–New Carrollton Line Metro stations	Greenbelt Metro station	↔	New Carrollton Metro station (the west side)	Greenbelt Road; Hanover/Princess Garden Parkway; Annapolis Road	Renamed into the P21.
G14; Greenbelt Road–Good Luck Road Line	Greenbelt Metro station	↔	New Carrollton Metro station (the west side)	Greenbelt Road; Cipriano Road; Annapolis Road	Renamed into the P20.
H12; Temple Hills–Marlow Heights Line	Temple Hills (Heather Hills Apartments)	↔	Naylor Road Metro station	St. Barnabas Road; Branch Avenue	Transferred to TheBus and split into two routes.
J1, J2; Bethesda–Silver Spring Line	Montgomery Mall	↔	Silver Spring Metro station (Paul S. Sarbanes Transit Center)	Old Georgetown Road; MD Route 355; East-West Highway; Jones Bridge Road (J1); Rockledge Drive (J1); Democracy Boulevard (J2); Battery Lane (westbound AM rush only)	J1 discontinued with no replacement service.; J2 renamed into the M70.
J12; Marlboro Pike Line	Forestville (8431 Old Marlboro Pike)	↔	Addison Road station	Central Avenue; Larchmont Avenue; Marlboro Pike	Combined with the K12 and renamed into the P66.
K6; New Hampshire Avenue–Maryland Line	White Oak Shopping Center	↔	Fort Totten Metro station	New Hampshire Avenue	Renamed into the M60.
K9; New Hampshire Avenue–Maryland Limited Line	Food & Drug Administration/Federal Research Center	↔	Fort Totten Metro station	New Hampshire Avenue	Renamed into the M6X.
K12; Forestville Line	Branch Avenue Metro station	↔	Suitland Metro station	Allentown Road; Silver Hill Road; Forestville Road	Combined with the V14 and renamed into the P62.
L8; Connecticut Avenue–Maryland Line	Aspen Hill (Grand Pre & Bel Pre Roads)	↔	Friendship Heights Metro station	Connecticut Avenue	Combined with the Y2 and Y8 and renamed into the M22.; Service to Aspen Hill replaced with extended RideOn route 41
L12; Landover Road Line	Capital Plaza Mall	↔	Downtown Largo Metro station	Landover Road	Renamed into the P41.
NH1; National Harbor–Southern Avenue Line	Southern Avenue Metro station	↔	National Harbor (St. George Boulevard & Waterfront Street)	Southern Avenue; Owens Road; Oxon Hill Road	Combined with the D12 and renamed into the P90 and P94.
NH2; National Harbor–Alexandria Line	King Street–Old Town station	↔	National Harbor (St. George Boulevard & Waterfront Street)	I-495; Monument Avenue / MGM National Avenue	Combined with the D12 and renamed into the P90.
P12; Eastover–Addison Road Line	Eastover Shopping Center	↔	Addison Road Metro station	Silver Hill Road; Iverson Street	Split into two routes and renamed into the P60 (between Addison Road and Suitland), and P93, P94 (between Suitland and Eastover).
P18; Oxon Hill–Fort Washington Line	Fort Washington Park & Ride Lot	↔	Southern Avenue Metro station	Oxon Hill Road; Southern Avenue	Renamed into the P97.
Q2, Q4, Q6; Veirs Mill Road Line	Q2, Q6 Shady Grove Metro station; Q4 Rockville Metro station (the west side)	↔	Silver Spring Metro station (Paul S. Sarbanes Transit Center) (Q2, Q4); Wheaton Metro station (Q6)	Veirs Mill Road (Q2, Q4, Q6); Georgia Avenue (Q2, Q4); MD 355, Montgomery College (Q2, Q6)	Q6 was shortened to Montgomery College and was renamed to Ride On Route 40; Q2 and Q4 shortened to Wheaton to align with route Y7 to become route M20; Q2 and Q6 service between Shady Grove and Montgomery College was replaced by route 55
R1, R2; Riggs Road Line	R1 Adelphi (Riggs Rd & Edwards Way); R2 Calverton (Plum Orchard Drive & Healing Way)	↔	Fort Totten Metro station	Riggs Road	Renamed into the P15 (R1) and P16 (R2).
R4; Queens Chapel Road Line	Highview	↔	Brookland-CUA station	Queens Chapel Road; Michigan Avenue NE	Renamed into the P33.
R12; Kenilworth Avenue Line	Deanwood Metro station	↔	Greenbelt Metro Metro station	Kenilworth Avenue; Edmonston Road	Renamed into the P14.
T2; River Road Line	Rockville Metro station (the east side)	↔	Friendship Heights Metro station	Falls Road; River Road	Renamed into the M82.
T14; Rhode Island Avenue–New Carrollton Line	New Carrollton Metro station (the west side)	↔	Rhode Island Avenue - Brentwood Metro station	Riverdale Road; Edmonston Road; Rhode Island Avenue NE	Combined with the F1 and renamed into the P42.
T18; Annapolis Road Line	New Carrollton Metro station (the west side)	↔	Rhode Island Avenue - Brentwood Metro station	Annapolis Road; Rhode Island Avenue NE	Renamed into the P40.
V12; District Heights–Suitland Line	Addison Road Metro station	↔	Suitland Metro station	Shadyside Avenue; Marlboro Pike	Combined with the F14 and renamed into the P61.
V14; District Heights–Seat Pleasant Line	Penn Mar Shopping Center	↔	Deanwood Metro station	Walker Mill Road; Central Avenue; Addison Road	Combined with the K12 and renamed into the P62.
W14; Bock Road Line	Fort Washington Forest (Old Fort Road & Indian Head Highway); Friendly (Allentown & Old Fort Roads)	↔	Southern Avenue Metro station	Bock Road; Southern Avenue	Transferred to TheBus and renamed into Route P95.
Y2, Y7, Y8; Georgia Avenue–Maryland Line	Y2, Y8 MedStar Montgomery Medical Center; Y7 Georgia Ave – ICC Park & Ride Lot	↔	Silver Spring Metro station (Paul S. Sarbanes Transit Center)	Georgia Avenue	Y2 and Y8 combined with the L8 and renamed into the M22.; Y7 renamed into the M20.
Z2; Colesville–Ashton Line	Olney (Spartan Rd & Georgia Ave)	↔	Silver Spring Metro station (Paul S. Sarbanes Transit Center)	New Hampshire Avenue; Colesville Road	Discontinued with no replacement service.
Z6, Z8; Silver Spring-Fairland Line	Z6 Burtonsville Shopping Center; Z8 Greencastle Park & Ride Lot	↔	Silver Spring Metro station (Paul S. Sarbanes Transit Center)	Briggs Chaney Road (Z8); Calverton Blvd (Z6); Old Columbia Pike; Lockwood Drive; Colesville Road	Z6 renamed into the M52.; Z8 renamed into the M54.
Z7; Laurel–Burtonsville Express Line	South Laurel Park & Ride Lot	↔	Silver Spring Metro station (Paul S. Sarbanes Transit Center)	Cherry Lane; Sandy Spring Road; Old Columbia Pike; Columbia Pike; Colesville Road	Combined with the Z6 and renamed into the M52.

==== Former routes history ====
Route	History
83, 86	Formerly known as the Rhode Island Avenue-Maryland Line (along with the former 84 & 85) and the Maryland Line; 81, 82, 83, and 86 operate on portions of the old 82 Maryland Streetcar Line, which ran from West Potomac Park to Branchville until replaced by buses in 1958; they operate on the old route served by the 82 until 1993. 86 operates on portions of the old 84 & G6 Maryland Streetcar Line, which ran from Branchville to Beltsville until replaced by buses between 1949 & 1958.; 81 was discontinued on March 27, 2016, and replaced by routes 83 and C2.; 82 was discontinued on December 18, 2016, and replaced by route 83.; Route 83 was replaced by Routes M42 and P1X while Route 86 was replaced by Routes P10 and M44 on June 29, 2025.
89M	89 originally operated between Mount Rainier terminal and West Potomac Park around the 1950s to 1960s.; 89 used to operate between Rhode Island Avenue station until the Greenbelt station opened on December 11, 1993.; Route 89 was suspended on March 23, 2020; later discontinued by September 5, 2021.; Replaced by Route P12 on June 29, 2025.
A12	Route A12 is extended to Capitol Heights station on Sundays only replacing a portion of route F14.; A11, A12 used to serve the former Landover Mall site until March 30, 2014.; Route A11 was discontinued on March 29, 2015.; Route A12 service was split into two separate routes on June 25, 2023. A12 service was extended to New Carrollton station from Brightseat Road while service to Capital Plaza and along Landover Road was replaced by Route L12.; Replaced by Route P60 on June 29, 2025.
B21, B22	Replaced by TheBus Route P71 on June 29, 2025.
B24	B25 was replaced by the B24 on August 23, 2015.; Replaced by TheBus Routes P23 and P71 on June 29, 2025.
B27	Replaced by Routes P20 and P24 on June 29, 2025.
C2, C4	C2 originally terminated at Montgomery Mall until January 27, 1985, when it was rerouted to terminate at Twinbrook station. The portion between Wheaton Plaza and Montgomery Mall was replaced by Ride On route 35.; C2 was extended to Greenbelt Center after Greenbelt station opened in December 1993.; But the route was truncated to Greenbelt station December 2010.; C4 was extended to Prince George's Plaza (now Hyattsville Crossing) station from Langley Park after PG Plaza station opened in December 1993.; On March 27, 2016, Sunday service was added to the C2 between Greenbelt station and Takoma Langley Crossroads Transit Center only.; Late night C2 trips ending at Randolph Road & Parklawn Drive were extended to Twinbrook station on September 5, 2021.; Route C2 replaced by Routes M12, P31, and P32 while Route C4 replaced by Route M12 on June 29, 2025.
C8	Added service to the Food and Drug Administration/Federal Research Center (weekdays only) and Archives II (weekdays only) on June 17, 2012.; Replaced by Routes M42, M44, and TheBus Route P37 on June 29, 2025.
C11, C13	Replaced by TheBus Route P85 on June 29, 2025.
C12, C14	C12: AM trips skip the Marlow Heights Shopping Center Roadway.; C12 & C14 originally operated between Potomac Avenue station & intersection of Auth Road up until Naylor Road & Branch Avenue stations opened on January 13, 2001.; Replaced by TheBus Route P83 on June 29, 2025.
C21, C22, C26, C29	C26 served Addison Road station until Largo Town Center station opened in 2004.; The C26 was originally part of the "Kingsford-Addison Road Line" along with the old C23, C24, & C25 around the late 1990s to early 2000s.; Sunday C29 service was added on December 18, 2004.; C22 and C29 was rerouted to no longer serve Harry S Truman Drive south of Mount Lubentia Way as of 2/23/2018 due to a deficient bridge.; C29 was rerouted to Bowie State University in March 2006 on Saturdays only.; Route C26 was extended from Kettering to Bowie Park & Ride on Weekdays to replace Route B29 and C28 service.; Replaced by Routes P63 (between Largo and Addison Road), P72 (C26, C29), and P73 (C21, C22) on June 29, 2025.
C27	Introduced on May 28, 2005, to provide additional service for the C21/C22/C26/C29 during the summer seasons.; Replaced by Routes P63 and P73 on June 29, 2025.
D12	D12 originally operated alongside the former S12 routing between the Eastover Shopping Center & Federal Center station, via the Marlow Heights Shopping Center until the Southern Avenue & Suitland stations opened on January 13, 2001.; Route S12 was discontinued on January 13, 2001, and the D12 was truncated to only operate between the Southern Avenue & Suitland stations.; Routes D13 and D14 were created on January 13, 2001, which were a rename route W11 and W12, to operate between the newly opened Southern Avenue and Suitland stations, via Andrews Air Force Base, as well as Camp Springs and Temple Hills neighborhoods, and a small portion of Indian Head Highway, Forest Heights, and Glassmanor neighborhoods, which former Routes W11, W12, and W17 originally operated on between the Federal Center SW station & Acokeek up until the Southern Avenue station opened on January 13, 2001.; D14 does not serve the Marlow Heights Shopping Center.; Route D13 was renamed into Route D14 which in turn, discontinued service in Glassmanor.; D12 was changed to operate along Deal Drive and Audrey Lane and no longer operate along Glassmanor Drive and Irvington Street on December 17, 2023.; D12 was replaced by Routes P90, P93 (Birchwood Loop), and P96 while D14 was replaced by Routes P87 and P96 on June 29, 2025.
D14
F1	F1 replaced the old F3 on December 11, 1993.; F2 was discontinued on December 17, 2023.; Replaced by Routes D34, and P42 on June 29, 2025.
F4	The New Carrollton-Silver Spring Line was originally operated by route F4 and F6.; Route F6 was split from the line and rerouted from Silver Spring to Fort Totten station on June 17, 2012.; Service was rerouted inside Riverdale Park to its pre-March 2009 routing on September 5, 2021.; Replaced by Route P30 on June 29, 2025.
F6	Originally a part of the New Carrollton-Silver Spring Line alongside route F4.; Rerouted to Fort Totten station on June 17, 2012, replacing route R3.; Replaced by Route P35 on June 29, 2025.
F8	F8 operates on portions of the old B6, G4, G8, and 88 streetcar lines.; Replaced by Routes P31, P32, and P35 on June 29, 2025.
F12	Replaced by TheBus Route P44 on June 29, 2025.
F13	Replaced by TheBus Routes P22 and P23 on June 29, 2025.
F14	Formerly known as the Sheriff Road Line.; F14 used to terminate at Bradbury Heights (Southern Avenue & Pear Street) until Naylor Road opened in 2001.; Service between Capitol Heights and Addison Road stations on Sundays is provided by route A12.; Detours on Sheriff Road at Redskins Road During Events at FedExField.; Replaced by Routes P61 and P63 on June 29, 2025.
G12	Formerly known as routes T16 & T17; G12 replaces the portions of the C2 & R12 east of Greenbelt to/from Greenbelt Center/New Carrollton.; G13, G14 & G16 replaces parts of routes C2 and T16 & T17 in its entirety.; Routes G13 and G16 was discontinued on March 27, 2016, and replaced with the G12 & G14 routes.; Routes G12 and G14 added Sunday service on March 27, 2016.; Both lines were split into their own separate routes on June 6, 2021.; G12 was replaced by Route P21 while Route G14 was replaced by Route P20 and P24 on June 29, 2025.
G14
H12	H11 via the Princeton Estates Apartments; H13 bypasses Hillcrest Heights and Marlow Heights; H11, H13: skips Marlow Heights Shopping Center Roadway; H11, H12 and the former H14 used to operate all the way between the Potomac Avenue station and Temple Hills until Naylor Road station opened on January 13, 2001.; Once Naylor Road station opened on January 13, 2001, H14 was replaced by H13 and H11 and H12, as well as the new H13 Metrobus Route, were truncated to only operate between the Naylor Road Metro Station & Temple Hills.; Route H11 and H13 were suspended on March 16, 2020; later discontinued by September 5, 2021.; Replaced by Route P96 and TheBus Route P86 on June 29, 2025.
J1, J2	J2 originally operated between Montgomery Mall to Beltway Plaza before being replaced by route F6.; J1 used to go all the way to Montgomery Mall until it was truncated to Medical Center station on December 19, 2010.; Eastbound J2 buses serve the bus stop on Rockville Pike & South Drive at Medical Center station and no longer enter the bus loop as of June 24, 2018.; J1 was extended back to Montgomery Mall on June 24, 2018, which replaced route J3.; J1 was discontinued while Route J2 was replaced by Route M70 on June 29, 2025.
J12	Routes J11 and J13 were replaced by route J12 on June 26, 2016.; Replaced by Routes P63 and P66 on June 29, 2025.
K6	K6 operated south of Fort Totten to Metro Center and Federal Triangle when Metrorail was not open until Metro started operating earlier in the early 1990s.; K6 discontinued service to the FDA campus on December 29, 2013.; Replaced by Route M60 on June 29, 2025.
K9	Begin service on December 30, 2012; K9 no longer serves Northwest Park Apartments and was extended to Food & Drug Administration/Federal Research Center on December 29, 2013.; Replaced by Route M6X on June 29, 2025.
K12	Route K11 was replaced by K12 on June 26, 2016.; K12 was rerouted to serve Donnell Drive and Marlboro Pike as of June 24, 2018.; K13 was replaced by K12 on June 24, 2018.; Replaced by Routes P62 and P66 on June 29, 2025.
L8	Originally operated to Silver Spring station before Friendship Heights station opened.; Replaced by Route M22 and Ride-On Route 41 on June 29, 2025.
L12	Introduced on June 25, 2023 as a portion of the A12 which was split into two routes.; Replaced by Route P41 on June 29, 2025.
NH1	NH1 service was implemented in March 2008 between National Harbor and Southern Avenue station via Indian Head Highway and Southern Avenue. It was rerouted to Branch Avenue station in August 2009.; NH3 was introduced December 29, 2013 but was eliminated June 21, 2015. NH1 was then rerouted back to its original Southern Avenue station terminus and now operates via Southview Apartments.; Replaced by Routes P93, P94 and TheBus Route P88 on June 29, 2025.
NH2	NH2 is the only transit service connecting Maryland and Virginia via the Woodrow Wilson Bridge.; NH2 was introduced October 23, 2016, as a pilot and was made a permanent route in 2017.; Service to Huntington station was eliminated on August 23, 2020.; Replaced by Route P90 on June 29, 2025.
P12	Route no longer enters United Medical Center parking lot. Passengers wishing to visit hospital must alight/board at Forest Hills Apartments.; Route no longer operates on Walker Mill Road, Shady Glen Drive or Central Avenue, service on these streets is now provided by Route V12.; Route now operates on South Addison Road, replacing the former V12 routing.; Route no longer enters the Forest Hills Apartment Complex as of January 12, 2025. Buses remain on Southern Avenue and Wheeler Road.; Replaced by Routes P60 (between Addison Road and Suitland), P93 and P94 (both between Suitland and Eastover) on June 29, 2025.
P18	P18 was rerouted to Southern Avenue station via Southern Avenue on June 21, 2015.; Service to South Capitol Street, Firth Sterling Avenue and Anacostia station was discontinued on June 21, 2015.; Route P17 and P19 service to downtown DC was discontinued on June 25, 2017.; Route P17 was replaced by P18 on June 25, 2017.; Route P19 was suspended on March 23, 2020; later discontinued by September 5, 2021.; Replaced by Route P97 on June 29, 2025.
Q2, Q4, Q6	Q2 originally operated between Wheaton Plaza to Montgomery Village before being rerouted between Silver Spring and Shady Grove.; Q1, Q4, Q5 and Q6 were introduced on December 27, 2009, to restructure the Q2.; Q1 had a prior "incarnation" as a Veirs Mill Road Line until 2001.; Q4 had a prior "incarnation" as the Parkland Drive Line until September 1994.; Q1 & Q5 skips Montgomery College-Rockville while the Q2 & Q6 serve Montgomery College-Rockville; All Route Q1 and Q5 service were renamed into the Q2 and Q6 on June 25, 2023.; Replaced by Route M20 and Ride-On Route 40 on June 29, 2025.
R1, R2	R2 and R8 originally served Crystal City and then Kennedy Center prior to the 1980s.; R2 originally under the Queens Chapel Road Line until the Green Line extension to Greenbelt opened in 1993, having the R2 (alongside the R1) replace the R8 & R9.; Replaced by Routes P15 (R1) and P16 (R2) on June 29, 2025.
R4	R4 is a combination of the former R2, R4, R6 & R7 routes between Brookland station & West Hyattsville, replacing routes R6 and R7 in its entirety between West Hyattsville & Highview while route R2 was rerouted to Fort Totten station to become a part of the Riggs Road Line after the Greenbelt extension opened in 1993.; Replaced by Route P33 on June 29, 2025.
R12	Formerly the Kenilworth Avenue-New Carrollton Line until December 2010 when the route east of Greenbelt station was replaced by G12.; R11 was replaced by route R12 on August 23, 2015.; Replaced by Route P14 on June 29, 2025.
T2	Operated between Dupont Circle station and Montgomery College until January 27, 1985.; Replaced by Route M82 on June 29, 2025.
T14	84 was renamed T14 on December 14, 2014.; T14 had a prior "incarnation" as part of the Bowie-Belair Line until the mid-1990s when the route was discontinued.; Replaced by Routes P40 and P42 on June 29, 2025.
T18	Replaced by Route P40 on June 29, 2025.
V12	Route no longer operates on South Addison Road, service on this street is now provided by Route P12.; Route now operates on Central Avenue, Shady Glen Drive and Walker Mill Road, replacing the former P12 routing.; Replaced by Route P61 on June 29, 2025.
V14	V15 was replaced by V14 on March 27, 2016.; Sunday service now runs the full route between Penn Mar Shopping Center & Deanwood station as of March 27, 2016.; Select trips end at Addison Road station.; Replaced by Route P62 on June 29, 2025.
W14	W14 was rerouted to Southern Avenue Metrorail station via Southern Avenue on June 21, 2015, with service to South Capitol Street, Firth Sterling Avenue and Anacostia Metrorail station was discontinued.; Route W13 was replaced by W14 on June 25, 2017.; Replaced by TheBus Route P95 on June 29, 2025.
Y2, Y7, Y8	Route Y7 service to Rockville station was eliminated on June 29, 2003.; Routes Y5 & Y9 were eliminated August 24, 2014, and replaced by Y7 and Y8.; Route Y2 is a "reincarnated" route Y9 that was introduced on December 14, 2014.; Route Y8 discontinued all weekend service on December 14, 2014, but resumed weekend service on June 25, 2017.; Route Y7 discontinued all weekend service on June 25, 2017.; Replaced by Routes M20 and M22 on June 29, 2025.
Z2	Z2 was named the Colesville Road Line until 2004.; Midday service was discontinued on June 28, 2009.; The Saturday Z2 service, which operated as a Ride On route since September 1993, was eliminated January 12, 2013, due to very low ridership.; Discontinued on June 29, 2025.
Z6, Z8	Z6 had a prior incarnation operating between Four Corners (Marked Franklin via Dale) and Silver Spring.; Saturday service began on March 27, 2016, and operates between Silver Spring station & Castle Blvd only.; Z8 originally operated between the Silver Spring station and Burtonsville Park & Ride until September 26, 2004, when it was replaced by the Z6.; All route Z6 and Z8 service was merged into the Silver Spring-Fairland Line on September 5, 2021. Service to Verizon-Chesapeake Complex was eliminated as well.; Replaced by Routes M52 (Z6) and M54 (Z8) on June 29, 2025.
Z7	Route Z7 replaced the Z9 & Z29 on March 27, 2016.; Z7 had a prior "incarnation" as the Calverton Express Line along with the former Z17 until it was discontinued on September 26, 2004.; Replaced by Route M52 on June 29, 2025.

=== Routes eliminated before the Better Bus Redesign Network ===
These routes have been served by Metrobus at one point but have since been discontinued due to either low ridership, a duplication of another route, a simplification to other routes, combined into another route, low funding, or transferred to another bus company as it would be cheaper to maintain cost and for another carrier to operate the line. However, some routes would be reincarnated into new routes for Metrobus. Examples of reincarnations are routes C8 and Z6.

Route	Terminals			Streets traveled	History
66; Shady Grove Shuttle Line	Shady Grove Metro station	↔	I-370 Satellite Parking Lot	I-370	
81; College Park Line	Rhode Island Avenue–Brentwood Metro station	↔	Cherry Hill Campground (Jayrose Boulevard & Cherry Hill Road)	U.S. Route 1; Baltimore Avenue; Rhode Island Avenue	Discontinued on March 27, 2016 and replaced by route 83.
82; College Park Line	Rhode Island Avenue–Brentwood Metro station	↔	Mount Rainier Terminal	Rhode Island Avenue	A prior incarnation of route 82 would operate to Hollywood, Maryland.; Discontinued on December 18, 2016 and replaced by route 83.
83X; College Park Line	College Park–University of Maryland station	↔	Cherry Hill Park Campground	Baltimore Avenue	Operated from the third Monday in June through the second Friday of August each year.; Route was suspended, and later discontinued in 2021.
84; Rhode Island Avenue-New Carrollton Line	Rhode Island Avenue–Brentwood station	↔	New Carrollton station	Kenilworth Avenue; Riverdale Road; Rhode Island Avenue	Renamed T14 on December 14, 2014.
85; Rhode Island Avenue-New Carrollton Line	Rhode Island Avenue–Brentwood station	↔	New Carrollton station	Kenilworth Avenue; Riverdale Road; Rhode Island Avenue	Discontinued on December 30, 2007, and replaced by route 84.
87; Laurel Express Line	Laurel (Baltimore Ave & Main St, AM Start; Cypress St & Laurel Lakes Ave, PM End)	↔	Greenbelt station; New Carrollton station (East Side entrance) (select trips)	Baltimore-Washington Parkway; Baltimore Avenue	87 originally operated between College Park, Maryland and West Potomac Park under the old 87 streetcar station.; 87 operated to K St. & 11th St. NW via the Government Printing Office, SW Mall (L'Enfant Plaza station), West Potomac Park (State Department) until Greenbelt Station opened in 1993.; All Route 88 service was eliminated March 30, 2014.; Suspended as of March 18, 2020; later discontinued by September 5, 2021.
88; Laurel Express Line	Laurel (Baltimore Ave & Main St, AM Start; Cypress St & Laurel Lakes Av, PM End)	↔	New Carrollton station	Baltimore-Washington Parkway	Originally operated between Chevery to Rhode Island Ave; Discontinued on March 30, 2014. Replaced by route 87.
89; Laurel Line	Laurel (Cherry Lane & 4th Street (AM); Middletown Apts (PM)	↔	Greenbelt Metro station	Cherrywood Lane; Kenilworth Avenue; Edmonston Road; Baltimore Avenue	89 originally operated between Mount Rainier terminal and West Potomac Park around the 1950s to 1960s.; 89 used to operate between Rhode Island Avenue station until the Greenbelt station opened on December 11, 1993.; Suspended as of March 23, 2020; later discontinued by September 5, 2021 being replaced by the 89M.
A11; Martin Luther King Jr. Highway Line	Capital Plaza	↔	Federal Triangle Metro station (11th & E Sts., N.W.)	Martin Luther King Jr Ave; Pennsylvania Avenue (NW, NE, SE)	Discontinued on March 29, 2015, replaced by A12.
A13, A17; Martin Luther King Jr. Highway Line	Capital Plaza	↔		Martin Luther King Jr Ave	Discontinued on November 21, 1978 and replaced by route A12.
A15; Martin Luther King Jr. Highway Line	Capital Plaza Mall	↔	Addison Road station	Landover Road	Discontinued on December 18, 2004, and replaced by a combination of A12 and Prince George's County The Bus Route 22.
B11; Bethesda Reverse Commute Line	Rosslyn station	↔	Medical Center	Wisconsin Avenue	Discontinued on December 27, 2003.
B12	Penn Mar	↔	Potomac Avenue station	Pennsylvania Avenue	Discontinued November 21, 1978, replaced by V11 & V12.
B19	Suitland Federal Center	↔			Discontinued November 21, 1978, replaced by H17 & K17.
B23; Bowie–Belair Line	Bowie Park & Ride Lot	↔	New Carrollton station (West Side)	Annapolis Road; Fontana Drive	Discontinued on September 29, 2002, and replaced by route B24.
B25; Bowie-Belair Line	Bowie Park & Ride Lot	↔	New Carrollton station (West Side)	Annapolis Road	Discontinued on August 23, 2015, replaced by B24.
B29; Crofton–New Carrollton Line	Crofton Country Club; Gateway Center (Mitchellville Road & Harbour Way)	↔	New Carrollton station (East Side)	Crain Highway; John Hanson Highway	Suspended as of March 16, 2020; later discontinued by September 5, 2021 and replaced by Route C28 on June 6, 2021.
B30; Greenbelt–BWI Thurgood Marshall Airport Express Line	Baltimore/Washington International Thurgood Marshall Airport	↔	Greenbelt station	Baltimore-Washington Parkway; Interstate 195	Weekday service only.; Airport Express: $7.50 fare; On June 25, 2017, Saturday and Sunday service on the B30 Line was eliminated.; On June 24, 2018, B30 was rerouted to serve the Arundel Mills Mall.; Suspended as of March 18, 2020; later discontinued by September 5, 2021.
B31; Crofton-New Carrollton Line	Bowie Gateway Center	↔	New Carrollton station	Crain Highway; John Hanson Highway	Discontinued on June 26, 2016, replaced by B29.
C1; Wilson Lane Line	Glen Echo	↔	Friendship Heights station	Wisconsin Avenue; River Road; Wilson Lane; Old Georgetown Road; Goldsboro Road	Discontinued on January 22, 1984; replaced by Ride On route 31.
C3, C5		↔			Discontinued on January 2, 1981.
C4; Randolph Road Line	Montgomery College	↔	White Oak Shopping Center	Randolph Road	Discontinued on September 6, 1981. Replaced by extended Metrobus route Z4.
C6; Bel Pre Road Line	Rockville station	↔	Glenmont		Entered service on January 27, 1985.; Discontinued on February 22, 1987. Replaced by Metrobus routes Y4 and Y7.
C6; Randolph Road Line	Twinbrook	↔	Hillandale		Entered service on October 1, 1990. Replaced Metrobus route Z4 between Glenmont and Montgomery College.; Truncated from Montgomery College to Twinbrook station on December 30, 1991.; Discontinued in 1998 and replaced by Ride On 10 and Metrobus C8
C7; Korvettes-Sivler Spring Line	Silver Spring station	↔		Twinbrook Parkway; Chapman Avenue; Rockville Pike	
C7, C9; Greenbelt–Glenmont Line	Greenbelt Station	↔	Glenmont station	Randolph Road	Discontinued on June 28, 2009.
C8; Aspen Hill Road-Montgomery Mall Line	Montgomery Mall	↔	Glenmont station	Bel Pre Road; Connecticut Avenue; Aspen Hill Road; Twinbrook Parkway; Executive Boulevard; Old Georgetown Road	Discontinued in 1996 and replaced by Ride On 26.; C8 was reincarnated as the Glenmont–College Park Line in July, 1998 and later the College Park-White Flint Line on January 13, 2001
C18; Waldorf-Branch Avenue Line	Waldorf, Maryland	↔	Branch Avenue station	Branch Avenue; Crain Highway; Smallwood Drive; Saint Charles Parkway; Mattawoman-Beantown Road	Introduced on December 30, 2001; Discontinued on December 27, 2003.
C23, C24; Kingsford-Addison Road Line	Addison Road station	↔	Kingsford		C24 discontinued in December, 1998 and replaced by the C25 route; C23 discontinued around 2003
C25; Central Avenue Line	Addison Road station	↔	East Kettering	Central Avenue	Discontinued on December 18, 2004, and replaced by route C26.
C28; Pointer Ridge Line	Pointer Ridge (Hall Road & Pointer Ridge Dr)	↔	New Carrollton station (East Side)	John Hanson Highway	Suspended as of March 18, 2020; later discontinued by September 5, 2021 being replaced by Route C26 on June 6, 2021.
D13; Oxon Hill–Suitland Line	Suitland station	↔	Southern Avenue station	Brinkley Road; Allentown Road; Indian Head Highway	Discontinued on September 5, 2021. Replaced by Route D14.
F2; Chillum Road Line	Takoma station	↔	Cheverly station	Chillum Road; Eastern Avenue; 34th Street; Landover Road	Operates early mornings, late nights, and weekends only.; Discontinued on December 17, 2023. Replaced by Route F1.
F3; Chillum Road Line	Takoma station	↔	Columbia Park	Chillum Road	Discontinued on December 11, 1993. Replaced by F8 & F12
F5; Sargent Road Line	Fort Totten station	↔	The Mall at Prince Georges	Sargent Road	Discontinued December 11, 1993, replaced by R3.; See Greenbelt–Fort Totten Line
F9	Lewisdale	↔	Potomac Park		
G1; Greenbelt Station Parking Lot Shuttle	Greenbelt Station	↔			Discontinued on December 27, 2003.
G7, G9; Queens Chapel Road Line	Highview Apartment Complex	↔	Downtown, Washington D.C.		Discontinued February 6, 1978, replaced by the R2, R4, R6, and R7; G9 was reincarnated as the Rhode Island Avenue Limited Line in 2017; See Queens Chapel Road Line.
G8	Langley Park, Maryland	↔	Prince George's Hospital Center		
G13, G16; Greenbelt-New Carrollton Line	Greenbelt station	↔	New Carrollton station	Greenbelt Road; Cipriano Road; Annapolis Road	Discontinued on March 27, 2016, and replaced by G12 and G14.
H11, H13; Temple Hills–Marlow Heights Line	Temple Hills (Heather Hills Apartments)	↔	Naylor Road station	St. Barnabas Road; Branch Avenue	Routes were suspended on March 16, 2020; later discontinued by September 5, 2021.
H14; Temple Hills–Marlow Heights Line	Potomac Avenue station	↔	Heather Hills Apartments		Discontinued on January 13, 2001, after Naylor Road Station opened, replaced by H11, H12, and H13.
H17	Potomac Avenue station	↔			Discontinued on November 21, 1978.
J3; Bethesda–Silver Spring Line	Montgomery Mall	↔	Silver Spring station (Paul S. Sarbanes Transit Center)	Democracy Boulevard; Old Georgetown Road; Cedar Lane; Rockville Pike/ Wisconsin Avenue; East-West Highway	Discontinued on June 24, 2018, replaced by J1.
J4; Bethesda–Silver Spring Line	Friendship Heights station	↔	Silver Spring station		Truncated from Beltway Plaza to Silver Spring station on February 19, 1978.; Discontinued on January 27, 1985.
J4; College Park–Bethesda Line	Bethesda station	↔	College Park–University of Maryland station	East-West Highway; University Boulevard East	Introduced on April 15, 2002.; Since June 22, 2014, eastbound J4 buses operate on Stadium Drive during the Campus Drive construction project; westbound route remains unchanged.; Suspended on March 16, 2020; later discontinued by September 5, 2021.
J5; Montgomery Village–Rock Spring Park Line (Village Express)	Montgomery Village	↔	Rock Spring Park		
J5; Twinbrook–Silver Spring Line	Twinbrook station (West Side)	↔	Silver Spring station (Paul S. Sarbanes Transit Center)	Rockville Pike; Capital Beltway	Discontinued on June 25, 2017.
J6	Federal Triangle	↔	Silver Spring station		Discontinued on February 19, 1978.; Maryland portion replaced by Ride On route 12.; DC portion replaced by Metrobus route P2.
J6; Bethesda–Silver Spring Line	Friendship Heights station	↔	Silver Spring station	Leland Street; Connecticut Avenue	Discontinued on January 22, 1984. Replaced by extended Ride On routes 1 and 11.
J7		↔			Discontinued September 24, 1978, replaced by C1 & T1.
J7; Rock Spring Park Express Line		↔		South Drive; Center Drive; Old Georgetown Road; Democracy Boulevard; Rockledge Drive.	Discontinued on December 29, 1996, and replaced by route J1.
J7, J9; I–270 Express Line	Lakeforest Mall	↔	Bethesda station	Interstate 270	Discontinued on September 29, 2017; Replaced by Ride On 101.
J8; University Boulevard Line	Wheaton Plaza	↔	Beltway Plaza Mall	University Boulevard	Was turned into Route C2
J8; I–270 Express Line	Lakeforest Mall	↔	Bethesda station	Interstate 270	Renamed as J7 on September 26, 2004.
J11, J13; Marlboro Pike Line	J11 Addison Road station; J13 Potomac Avenue station	↔	Forestville (8431 Old Marlboro Pike)	Marlboro Pike; Larchmont Avenue	Discontinued on June 26, 2016, replaced by J12.
J14, J15; Marlboro Pike Line	Addison Road station	↔	Ritchie	Marlboro Pike; Larchmont Avenue	Discontinued on December 18, 2004; replaced by TheBus #24.
J16; Marlboro Pike Line	Potomac Avenue station	↔		Palmer Highway; Addison Road; Central Avenue; Larchmont Avenue; Marlboro Pike; Bowen Road; Alabama Avenue; Pennsylvania Avenue	Discontinued January 1, 1981, replaced by A12, F14, J12 & J14.
K5, K8; New Hampshire Avenue Line		↔			
K7, K9	Tamarack	↔	K7 Southwest Mall; K9 Federal Triangle		
K11; Forestville Line	Penn Mar Shopping Center	↔	Potomac Avenue station	Pennsylvania Avenue	Discontinued on June 26, 2016, replaced by K12.
K13; Forestville Line	Penn Mar Shopping Center	↔	Suitland station	Pennsylvania Avenue	Introduced on January 13, 2001; Discontinued on June 24, 2018, replaced by K12.
K14; Forestville Line		↔			
K17		↔			
K18	Upper Marlboro, Maryland	↔	Fairfax Village		
K19; Forestville Line	Potomac Avenue station	↔	Penn Mar	Pennsylvania Avenue	Discontinued on January 13, 2001, replaced by K13.
L3; Connecticut Avenue-Maryland Line	Wheaton station	↔	Federal Triangle	Connecticut Avenue	
L6	Garrett Park	↔	Federal Triangle	Connecticut Avenue; Strathmore Avenue; Knowles Avenue	Discontinued on February 19, 1978. Portion along Strathmore/Knowles Avenues replaced by Ride On route 5.
L6; Connecticut Avenue-Wheaton Line	Wheaton station	↔	Van Ness–UDC station	Connecticut Avenue	Discontinued on September 28, 1990.
L7; Connecticut Avenue-Maryland Line	Wheaton station	↔	Friendship Heights station	Connecticut Avenue	Truncated from Van Ness–UDC station to Friendship Heights station on October 1, 1990.; Discontinued June 28, 2009.
M11; Suitland Line	Potomac Avenue station	↔	Auth Place & Auth Way	Pennsylvania Avenue	Discontinued on January 13, 2001, and replaced by routes D13, D14, and K12.
M12		↔			
N8; Massachusetts Avenue-Maryland Line	Friendship Heights station	↔	Glen Echo	Western Avenue; Massachusetts Avenue; Goldsboro Road	Replaced route N4 between Westmoreland Circle and Glen Echo on January 27, 1985.; Discontinued on June 28, 1992; replaced by Ride On route 29.
N11, N13; Branch Avenue-King Street Express Line	N11 Branch Avenue station; N13 Suitland station	↔	King Street–Old Town station	Saint Barnabas Road (N13); Oxon Hill Road (N11); Woodrow Wilson Bridge	Introduced on January 13, 2001.; Discontinued on June 26, 2004.
NH3; National Harbor–Southern Avenue Line	Southern Avenue station	↔	National Harbor (St. George Boulevard & Waterfront Street)	Capital Beltway; Indian Head Highway	Discontinued on June 21, 2015, and replaced by route NH1.
P13; Oxon Hill-Pentagon Line	Pentagon station	↔	Eastover Shopping Center	Woodrow Wilson Bridge; Indian Head Highway; Washington Street; George Washington Memorial Parkway; Eads Street	Discontinued on January 13, 2001, when Southern Avenue Metro Station opened. Replaced by the N11 and N13.
P17; Oxon Hill–Fort Washington Line	Farragut Square	↔	Fort Washington Park & Ride Lot	Oxon Hill Road; South Capitol Street	Discontinued on June 25, 2017, replaced by Route P18.
P19; Oxon Hill–Fort Washington Line	Fort Washington Park & Ride Lot	↔	Southern Avenue station	Oxon Hill Road; Southern Avenue	Suspended as of March 23, 2020; later discontinued by September 5, 2021.
Q1; Veirs Mill Road Line	Rockville station	↔	Wheaton station	Veirs Mill Road	Entered service on October 1, 1990.; Discontinued on January 13, 2001, and replaced by route Q2.; Q1 was eventually "reincarnated" and extended to Shady Grove and Silver Spring stations on December 27, 2009.
Q1, Q5; Veirs Mill Road Line	Shady Grove station	↔	Silver Spring station (Paul S. Sarbanes Transit Center) (Q1); Wheaton station (Q5)	Veirs Mill Road	Renamed into the Q2 and Q6 on June 25, 2023.
Q3; Aspen Hill-Wheaton Line	Glenmont	↔	Aspen Hill	Connecticut Avenue	Entered service on October 1, 1990.; Discontinued in 1994 & replaced by Ride On route 41.
Q4; Parkland Drive Lane	Wheaton station	↔	Rockville		Replaced by Ride On 48 in 1994.; Q4 was brought back to service in December, 2009.
Q5, Q9	Glenmont station	↔	Federal Triangle		
Q7	Montgomery Village	↔	Federal Triangle		
Q8; Veirs Mill Road Line	Silver Spring station	↔	Montgomery Mall	Randolph Road; Dewey Road; Garrett Park Road; Schuylkill Road; Parklawn Drive; Montrose Road; Seven Locks Road	Discontinued on January 27, 1985. Replaced by Ride On route 38 and Ride On route 47.
R3; Greenbelt-Prince George's Plaza Line	Greenbelt Station	↔	Hyattsville Crossing station	Greenbelt Road; Metzerott Road	Service discontinued March 27, 2016.; Service between Prince George's Plaza (now Hyattsville Crossing) station to Fort Totten station ended June 17, 2012, and was replaced by the F6, and R2.; See Greenbelt–Fort Totten Line.
R5	Fort McNair	↔	Kennedy Center		
R5; Riggs Road Line	Fort Totten station	↔	Calverton	Riggs Road; Beltsville Drive; Calverton Boulevard	Discontinued June 17, 2012, replaced by R2.; See Riggs Road Line
R6, R7; Queens Chapel Road Line	Brookland–CUA station	↔	R6 Lewisdale (Lewisdale Drive & 23rd Avenue); R7 Highview Apartments	Queens Chapel Road	Discontinued on December 11, 1993, and replaced by the R3 and R4.; See Queens Chapel Road Line and Riggs Road Line
R7; Riggs Road Line	Fort Totten station	↔	Calverton	Riggs Road; Beltsville Drive; Calverton Boulevard	Discontinued in 1998 due to safety concerns at the US Army Research Laboratory. Replaced by the R2.; See Queens Chapel Road Line and Riggs Road Line
R8, R9; Riggs Road Line	Fort Totten station	↔	Calverton	Riggs Road/ Powder Mill Road; Beltsville Drive	R8 originally served Crystal City and then Kennedy Center prior to the 1980s.; Discontinued on December 11, 1993, replaced by R1, R2, and R5.; See Riggs Road Line
R11; Kenilworth Avenue Line	Deanwood station	↔	Greenbelt station	Kenilworth Avenue; River Road; Paint Branch Parkway; Edmonston Road; Greenbelt Road; Cherrywood Lane	Discontinued August 23, 2015, and replaced by R12.
R11, R15; Greenbelt–New Carrollton Express Line	New Carrollton station	↔	Beltway Plaza Mall	Capital Beltway (R11); Princess Garden Parkway (R15)	Discontinued December 11, 1993, when Greenbelt station opened. Replaced by routes R12, T15, T16, and T17.
R13, R14; Kenilworth Avenue Line	Macke Industrial Park Complex	↔	Southwest Washington DC	Kenilworth Avenue	Discontinued on July 18, 1977
S12; Eastover-Marlow Heights Line	Federal Center station	↔	Southview (Southview Drive & Southview Court)	Capitol Street	Discontinued on January 13, 2001, and replaced by routes D12, and P12.
S95	Mid-Pike Plaza	↔	North Bethesda station		Discontinued on April 1, 2004.
T1; Bradley Boulevard Line	Friendship Heights station	↔	Congressional Country Club		Rerouted from Friendship Heights station to Bethesda station on January 27, 1985.; Discontinued in 1989 and replaced by Ride On 36
T3; River Road Line	Montgomery College	↔	Federal Triangle	River Road; Wisconsin Avenue	
T4; Old Georgetown Road Line	Bethesda station	↔	Twinbrook station	Old Georgetown Road	Discontinued on December 29, 1991, replaced by Ride On 42 & 46.
T6; Bethesda-Rockville Line	Friendship Heights station	↔	Montgomery College		Discontinued on December 29, 1991, replaced by Ride On 42 & 46.
T5	Riggs Rd	↔	Alta Vista, Maryland		
T7		↔			Discontinued in 1984.
T8; Gaithersburg Line	Montgomery Village	↔	Montgomery College		
T9; Westboard Shuttle	Friendship Heights station	↔	NIH (Bethesda	Western Avenue; Wisconsin Avenue	Discontinued on January 31, 1982.
T10, T11; Central Ave-Belair Line	Capitol Heights station	↔	Kettering, Maryland (T10); Belair Center (T11)	Central Ave	Discontinued around the 1990s & replaced by C21, C22, C26, C27, C29.
T12, T14; Bowie-Belair Line	New Carrollton station	↔	Bowie State University	Central Ave	Discontinued around 1995 & replaced by B24, B25 & B27; Route T14 was reincarnated into the Rhode Island Avenue–New Carrollton Line on December 14, 2014.
T15; Greenbelt Line	Greenbelt station	↔	New Carrollton station	Greenbelt Road; Cipriano Road; Annapolis Road	Discontinued on September 29, 2002, and replaced with a combination of the R12, T16, and T17.
T16, T17; Greenbelt Line	Greenbelt station	↔	New Carrollton station	Greenbelt Road; Cipriano Road; Annapolis Road	Discontinued on December 19, 2010; replaced by G12, G13, G14 & G16.; See Greenbelt-New Carrollton Line.
T19	Crofton	↔	New Carrollton station		
V11; District Heights Line	Penn Mar Shopping Center	↔	Potomac Avenue station		Discontinued on November 22, 1980, and replaced by the V12, & V14
V11; District Heights–Suitland Line	Addison Road station	↔	Potomac Avenue station	Central Avenue; Walker Mill Road	Introduced on December 30, 2001; Discontinued on June 24, 2007, and replaced by the V12
V15; District Heights–Seat Pleasant Line	Penn Mar Shopping Center	↔	Deanwood station	Walker Mill Road; Central Avenue; Addison Road	Introduced in December, 1998 to replace V14's diversion off of Hill Road onto the intersections of Hastings Drive & Pepper Mill Drive to join Central Avenue when V14 was rerouted to operate straight on Hill Road to join Central Avenue; Discontinued on March 27, 2016 & replaced by the V14.
W11, W12; Eastover–Indian Head Highway Line	Federal Center SW station	↔	Camp Springs (Allentown Way & Old Branch Avenue)	Indian Head Highway	Renamed routes D13 and D14 on January 13, 2001.
W13; Bock Road Line	Farragut Square	↔	Fort Washington Forest (Old Fort Road & Indian Head Highway)	Bock Road; South Capitol Street	Discontinued on June 25, 2017, replaced by the W14.
W15; Camp Springs-Indian Head Hwy. Line	Southern Avenue station	↔	Camp Springs (Old Branch Ave & Allentown Way)	Indian Head	Transferred and renamed TheBus 37 on June 21, 2015.
W17; Indian Head Highway Line	Southern Avenue station	↔	Accokeek, Maryland (Livingston Rand & Indian Head Highway)	Livingston Rand; Indian Head Highway	Originally a part of the Eastover–Indian Head Highway Line alongside the W11, W12, and W15 until January 13, 2001.; Discontinued on December 26, 2004; replaced by Route W13 and W15.
W19; Indian Head Express Line	Indian Head (Pye Street & Greenhow Circle)	↔	Southern Avenue station	Indian Head Highway	Introduced on January 13, 2001.; Discontinued on June 25, 2017.
Y1	Montgomery Village	↔	West Potomac Park		
Y1; White Flint-Wheaton Line	North Bethesda station	↔	Wheaton station	Randolph Road	Entered service on October 1, 1990.; Discontinued on July 24, 1998. Replaced by Ride On route 40.
Y2	Silver Spring station	↔	Kensington, Maryland	Seminary Road; Capitol View Avenue	Discontinued on February 19, 1978. Replaced by Ride On route 5.
Y3; Homecrest-Wheaton Line	Wheaton station	↔	Grand Pre and Bel Pre Roads (Aspen Hill)		Entered service on October 1, 1990.; Discontinued on July 25, 1998.
Y4	Silver Spring station	↔	Kensington, Maryland	Dexter Avenue; Brunswick Avenue; Plyers Mill Road	Discontinued on February 19, 1978. Replaced by Ride On route 6.
Y4; Bel Pre Road–Silver Spring Line	Rockville station	↔	Silver Spring station		Entered service on February 23, 1987.; Truncated to Wheaton station on October 1, 1990.; Replaced by Ride On route 49 on July 25, 1998.
Y4; Leisure World–Olney Line	Leisure World Clubhouse	↔	MedStar Montgomery Medical Center	Georgia Avenue	This route operated from October 14, 2014, to December 12, 2014, in order to provide service between Leisure World and MedStar Montgomery Hospital.; Replaced by routes Y2 and Y8 on December 14, 2014.
Y5; Norbeck–Wheaton Line	Wheaton station	↔	Rockville Station		
Y5, Y9; Georgia Avenue–Maryland Line	MedStar Montgomery Medical Center	↔	Silver Spring station	Georgia Avenue	Discontinued on August 24, 2014, and replaced by Y7 & Y8.
Y6; Georgia Avenue–Maryland Line	Silver Spring station	↔	Aspen Hill	Weller Road; Connecticut Avenue	Discontinued on July 25, 1998. Replaced by Ride On route 41.
Z4; Randolph Road Line	Montgomery College	↔	Silver Spring station (Weekday Peak Hours); White Oak (Off-peak)	Colesville Road; Randolph Road	
Z1, Z4; Glenmont-Silver Spring Line	Glenmont	↔	Silver Spring station	Colesville Road; Columbia Pike; Georgia Avenue	Discontinued on September 26, 2004; replaced by routes C7, Z2, Z6, and Z8.
Z2	Wheaton Plaza	↔	Silver Spring station	Forest Glen Road; Dallas Avenue; Tenbrook Drive; Arcola Avenue	Discontinued on February 19, 1978. Replaced by Ride On routes 8,9, and 19.
Z3, Z5; Colesville-Fairland Express Line	Burtonsville Park & Ride	↔	Silver Spring station	Colesville Road; Columbia Pike; Old Columbia Pike	Discontinued on September 26, 2004; replaced by routes Z2, Z6, and Z8.
Z6	Four Corners (Marked Franklin via Dale)	↔	Silver Spring station	Wayne Avenue; Dale Drive; Franklin Avenue; University Boulevard; Dennis Avenue	Discontinued on February 19, 1978. Replaced by Ride On routes.
Z7, Z17; Calverton Express Line	Silver Spring station	↔	Z7 Calverton (Beltsville Drive & Beltsville Road); Z17 Calverton (Centerpark Office Park)	Colesville Road; Columbia Pike; Beltsville Drive	Discontinued on September 26, 2004; replaced by routes Z6, and Z9.; Z7 was "reincarnated" as the Laurel-Burtonsville Express Line on March 27, 2016.
Z8	Franklin Avenue	↔	Silver Spring station	Sligo Avenue; Piney Branch Road; University Boulevard	Discontinued on February 19, 1978. Replaced by Ride On routes.
Z9, Z29; Laurel–Burtonsville Express Line	Silver Spring station	↔	South Laurel Park & Ride Lot	Colesville Road; Columbia Pike; Old Columbia Pike	Discontinued on March 27, 2016 & replaced by Z7.
Z11; Burtonsville–Greencastle Express Line	Burtonsville Park & Ride Lot.	↔	Silver Spring station (Paul S. Sarbanes Transit Center)	Columbia Pike; Castle Blvd	Was suspended as of March 18, 2020. Eventually replaced by Flash BRT on October 14, 2020.
Z13; Greencastle–Briggs Chaney Express Line	Silver Spring station	↔	Greencastle Park & Ride	Colesville Road; Columbia Pike	Introduced on December 30, 2001; Discontinued on March 27, 2016 & replaced by Z11.
Z19; Calverton Express Line	Silver Spring station	↔	Fairland (Seventh-day Adventist Church Parking Lot)	Colesville Road; Carroll Avenue; New Hampshire Avenue	Via Takoma station; Discontinued on June 29, 2003.
Hillside–Addison Road Shuttle Line	Addison Road station	↔	Hilliside Fringe Parking Lot	Central Avenue; Addison Road	

== See also ==
- List of Metrobus routes (Washington, D.C.)
- List of Metrobus routes in Washington, D.C.
- List of Metrobus routes in Virginia
