= List of bus routes in Maryland =

The List of bus routes in Maryland could refer to:

- List of MTA Maryland bus routes, primarily serving the Baltimore, Maryland area
- List of Metrobus routes in Maryland, primarily serving the Washington, D.C. area
