= I–270 Express Line =

J7, J9
- I–270 Express Line

Overview
- System: Metrobus
- Operator: Washington Metropolitan Area Transit Authority
- Garage: Montgomery
- Livery: Local
- Status: Replaced by Ride On extRa (Route 101)
- Began service: October 6, 1997
- Ended service: September 29, 2017

Route
- Locale: Montgomery County, Maryland
- Communities served: Bethesda, Maryland, Gaithersburg, Maryland
- Landmarks served: Lakeforest Transit Center, Rt. 124 Park & Ride Lot, National Institutes of Health, Naval Medical Center, Medical Center station, Battery Lane (J9), Bethesda station
- Start: Bethesda station
- Via: Interstate 270, Rockville Pike
- End: Lakeforest Transit Center

The I–270 Express Line, designated as Routes J7, J9, was an express bus route that was operated by the Washington Metropolitan Area Transit Authority between Bethesda station of the Red Line of the Washington Metro and Lakeforest Transit Center in Gaithersburg, Maryland. The line operated every 25–30 minutes during rush hours only with J7 trips taking roughly 25 minutes and J9 trips roughly taking 45 minutes. The route was discontinued due to low ridership and arrival of Ride On extRa (Route 101) on October 2, 2017.

== History ==
Route J7 originally operated in the Silver Spring area and was discontinued on September 24, 1978 and replaced by routes C1 and T1. It then operated as the Rock Creek Park Express Line but was discontinued and replaced by the J1 on December 29, 1996.

Route J8 originally operated between Wheaton Plaza and Beltway Plaza Mall before being replaced by route C2.

=== I-270 Express Line ===
The I–270 Express Line was created on October 6, 1997 funded by Maryland as route J9. The route provides express service along Interstate 270 between Bethesda station and Lakeforest Transit Center.

Route J8 would later be introduced and would operate along Edgemoor Lane, Woodmont Avenue, Norfolk Avenue, and Wisconsin Avenue before serving Medical Center station (but not enter the station loop instead serving stops along Rockville Pike). Then it will travel along Rockville Pike to Interstate 270 before exiting onto Montgomery Village Avenue and turning onto Lost Knife Road to serve Lakeforest Transit Center. It will then operate along Odendhal and Russell Avenue before getting back on the Interstate going back to both Medical Center and Bethesda.

Route J9 will operate along Old Georgetown Road, Battery Lane, Woodmont Avenue, and Wisconsin Avenue. However, only Northbound J9 trips will serve the Medical Center station loop while Southbound trips skip the loop. It will travel along Rockville Pike to Interstate 270 before exiting onto Diamond Avenue. Then it will run along Quince Orchard Road and serve Route 124 Park & Ride before running alongside route J7 to Lakeforest Transit Center. It will then follow it exact same routing back to Bethesda.

Restrictions were applied to both routes J7 and J9. During the morning peak hours, restrictions went as the following:

- J8 northbound (Local): Board and alight at all stops.
- J9 southbound (Express): Board only at the Lakeforest Transit Center, at any stop on Montgomery Village Avenue, or at the Route 124 Park & Ride Lot. Board and alight at any stop between Rockville Pike & South Drive (Medical Center Station) and Bethesda Station.

Afternoon peak hour restrictions went as the following:

- J8 southbound (Local): Board and alight at all stops.
- J9 northbound (Express): Board and alight at any stop between Bethesda Station and Medical Center Station. Alight only at the Route 124 Park & Ride Lot, at any stop on Montgomery Village Avenue, or at the Lakeforest Transit Center.

On September 26, 2004, route J8 was renamed route J7 keeping the same routing and schedule. The line was also converted from express to local but keept the express fare.

On June 28, 2009, the fare for express buses was increased from $1.60 to $3.10. Originally, WMATA proposed to discontinue the J7 and J9 but was rejected due to public feedback.

In October 2016, WMATA proposed to discontinue routes J7 and J9 as part of their FY2018 budget.

According to WMATA, route J7 and J9 has been suffering from low ridership and has a high subsidy per rider. Route J7 and J9 ridership has decreased 12,300 (-13%) total annual passengers between FY 2015 & FY 2016. FY16 total ridership was 85,657 compared to FY 2015 total ridership of 97,935 according to WMATA. The performance measures for WMATA goes as follows:

Performance Measure	Routes J7, J9	WMATA Guideline	Pass/Fail
Average Weekday Riders	326	>432	Fail
Cost Recovery	26.8%	>16.6%	Pass
Subsidy per Rider	$8.73	<$4.81	Fail
Riders per Trip	9.9	>10.7	Fail
Riders per Revenue Mile	0.6	>1.3	Fail

Alternative service is provided by Ride On routes 55, 56, and 61 and the upcoming Ride On extRa. The changes will occur in July 2017 if the route is approved for discontinuation.

On June 25, 2017, the express fare was raised to $4.25. This change led to more riders not riding routes J7 and J9 with the fare increasing and there were cheaper options than the expensive J7 and J9.

In September 2017, WMATA announced that routes J7 and J9 will be discontinued on September 29, 2017. The route will be replaced by the new Ride On extRa route 101 between Medical Center station and Lakeforest Transit Center. Ride On routes 55, 56, and 61 also provided alternative service along the former route J7 and J9 routing with routes J2 and other Ride On routes providing alternative service between Bethesda station and Medical Center station.

The reason for the failure of routes J7 and J9 were the expensive fare, long travel rides with traffic along Interstate 270, cheaper options by Ride On, and the reduced amount of frequencies of buses. Ridership began decreasing around the 2010s and WMATA decided to discontinue the entire line.

During WMATA's Better Bus Redesign draft proposals, WMATA included a new I-270 service that would operate between Bethesda station and German Transit Center as Route MD230. Another proposed service was to operate between Rockville station and Lakewood Transit Center as Route MD231 via Federck Road. However during the revised draft proposals, WMATA dropped the MD230 and MD231 routes due to them incorporating parts of Ride On's bus redesign in the network, and Ride On already developing plans for an I-270 service.

== Incidents ==
- On December 28, 2011, a J9 bus was involved in an multi-vehicle accident along Rockville Pike at Alta Vista Road. A pick-up truck crossed the path of the J9 bus and both vehicles collided with the J9 bus (D40LFR 6206) striking a tree on the side of Rockville Pike. The driver of the truck was killed in the accident while the driver of the Metrobus was transported to the hospital with serious injuries. Several injuries were also reported in the Metrobus.
