= Twinbrook–Silver Spring Line =

WMATA bus route J5

J5
- Twinbrook–Silver Spring Line

Overview
- System: Metrobus
- Operator: Washington Metropolitan Area Transit Authority
- Garage: Montgomery
- Livery: Local
- Status: Discontinued
- Ended service: June 25, 2017

Route
- Locale: Montgomery County, Maryland
- Communities served: Silver Spring, North Bethesda, Rockville, Twinbrook
- Landmarks served: Paul S. Sarbanes Transit Center (Silver Spring station), Grosvenor–Strathmore station, White Flint Mall, Parklawn building, Twinbrook station
- Start: Silver Spring station (Paul S. Sarbanes Transit Center)
- Via: Georgia Avenue, Capital Beltway, Rockville Pike, Parklawn Drive
- End: Twinbrook station

The Twinbrook–Silver Spring Line, designated Route J5, was a bus route operated by the Washington Metropolitan Area Transit Authority between Silver Spring station and Twinbrook station of the Red Line of the Washington Metro. The line operated during the weekday peak-hours only providing express service along the Capital Beltway connecting both Silver Spring and Rockville without having to enter Washington D.C. The line was discontinued on June 25, 2017 due to a budget crisis.

== History ==
Route J5 was created in the mid-1980s in order to provide new express service between Silver Spring station and Twinbrook station via Georgia Avenue, Capital Beltway, Rockville Pike, Parklawn Drive. The new J5 will connect Silver Spring station Grosvenor–Strathmore station, White Flint Mall, Parklawn building, and Twinbrook station.

The new route was to provide express service for passengers along the Capital Beltway so they would not have to enter Washington, D.C. by the Red Line. The line will operate every 30 minutes during the weekday peak-hours only in both direction.

In 2010 during WMATA's FY2011 budget, WMATA proposed to reroute the J5 along Georgia Avenue, Viers Mill Road, and Randolph Road and Wheaton station in order to replace route C4. Service along the Capital Beltway, Grosvenor–Strathmore station, Rockville Pike, and Nicholson Lane would be discontinued with no alternative service. The route would still operate during the rush hours only. WMATA reasons the reroute was to provide a replacement at times of heaviest passenger travel for Route C4 between Twinbrook and Wheaton Stations, which is proposed to be discontinued, supplement routes Q4 and Q6 on Veirs Mill Road between Randolph Road and Wheaton Station, and to supplement routes Q4 and Y5, Y7, Y8, Y9 on Georgia Avenue between Wheaton Station and Silver Spring station. The proposal did not go through however.

When the Paul S. Sarbanes Transit Center at Silver Spring station opened, route J5 was rerouted from its bus stop along Wayne Avenue to Bus Bay 218 at the transit center on the second level sharing the bay with routes Q1, Q2, and Q4.

In 2017 during WMATA's FY2018 budget year, WMATA proposed to eliminate route J5 due to low ridership, a high subsidy per rider, and alternative service on other Metrobus and Ride On routes. Performance measures goes as follow according to WMATA:

Performance Measure	Route J5	WMATA Guideline	Pass/Fail
Average Weekday Riders	284	>432	Fail
Cost Recovery	17.7%	>16.6%	Pass
Subsidy per Rider	$5.43	<$4.81	Fail
Riders per Trip	14.2	>10.7	Pass
Riders per Revenue Mile	1.4	>1.3	Pass

Route J5 ridership decreased 27,000 (-27%) total annual passengers between WMATA's FY2015 and FY2016 years. The FY2016 total ridership was 74,352 compared to FY 2015 total ridership of 101,323. Alternative service is provided by route C4 and Ride On routes 10 and 44 from Twinbrook station and along Parklawn Drive, Ride On route 38 along Nicholson Lane, and the Red Line between Grosvenor–Strathmore station and Silver Spring stations.

On June 25, 2017, route J5 was officially eliminated due to low ridership and WMATA's budget crisis.

Residents and the Montgomery County City Council voiced concerns over the proposed WMATA changes. Many riders relied on the J5 to work, as it's a cheaper alternative to the Red Line. Montgomery County Councilmember Tom Hucker also joined the fight to save the J5. In a letter to General Manager Paul Wiedefeld, Hucker stated:

The J5 bus line is vital to current riders to get to and from work each day. There are no alternative METRO bus lines that serve the same route. Eliminating the J5 bus line will cause most commuter daily commute times to increase by 50 to 100% or more as they will have to take the red line train through the city or take at least two buses to travel from home to work each day. Not only will the trip times increase drastically the daily commute cost will quadruple for many current J5 riders.

According to WMATA, ridership was low for the J5, and it was not making enough money to keep the route operating. Residents opposed a plea deal to change the J5 route to help out other Ride On and Metrobus routes, fewer runs of the J5, or use smaller buses for the J5.

During WMATA's Better Bus Redesign open comment summary, riders expressed that WMATA return the J5 to service or have a new service travel via the Capital Beltway. Despite this, WMATA did not include a service along the Capital Beltway between Silver Spring and Twinbrook in its revised draft proposal.
