= Burtonsville–Greencastle Express Line =

Z11
- Burtonsville–Greencastle Express Line

Overview
- System: Metrobus
- Operator: Washington Metropolitan Area Transit Authority
- Garage: Montgomery
- Livery: Local
- Status: Replaced by Flash BRT

Route
- Locale: Montgomery County, Maryland
- Communities served: Silver Spring, Four Corners, White Oak, Fairland, Burtonsville
- Landmarks served: Burtonsville Crossing Park & Ride Lot, Blackburn Road, Greencastle Park & Ride Lot, Briggs Chaney Park & Ride Lot, Castle Boulevard, Montgomery Auto Sales Park, Four Corners, Paul S. Sarbanes Transit Center (Silver Spring station)
- Start: Silver Spring station
- Via: Colesville Road, Columbia Pike, Castle Boulevard, Briggs Chaney Road, Ballinger Drive, and Greencastle Road
- End: Burtonsville Crossing Park & Ride Lot
- Length: 50 minutes

Service
- Level: Weekday peak hours only
- Frequency: 10-20 minutes
- Operates: 5:09 AM - 8:33 AM; 3:35 PM - 7:35 PM
- Transfers: SmarTrip only
- Timetable: Burtonsville–Greencastle Express Line

The Burtonsville–Greencastle Express Line, designated Route Z11, was a weekday peak-hour bus route operated by the Washington Metropolitan Area Transit Authority between Silver Spring station of the Red Line of the Washington Metro and Burtonsville Crossing Park & Ride Lot in Burtonsville, Maryland. The line operated every 10–25 minutes during the weekday peak hours in the peak direction only. Route Z11 trips are roughly 50 minutes long. The line was suspended on March 18, 2020 due to the COVID-19 pandemic and was a precursor of the Flash BRT.

== Background ==
Route Z11 operated during the weekday peak-hours between Silver Spring station and Burtonsville Crossing Park & Ride Lot via Briggs Chaney Park & Ride Lot, Castle Boulevard, and Greencastle Park & Ride Lot via Columbia Pike, Castle Boulevard, Colesville Road, Briggs Chaney Road, Ballinger Drive, and Greencastle Road. The Z11 was an express route to supplement routes Z6 and Z8 during the weekday peak-hours operating express along Columbia Pike while routes Z6 and Z8 operate in Calverton (Z6) and Old Columbia Pike (Z8). The route was suspended during WMATA's reduced service as response to the COVID-19 pandemic on March 18, 2020 and did not return on August 23, 2020. Route Z11 operated out of Montgomery division prior to the suspension.

Restrictions for route Z11 went as follows:

- Southbound: Customers may not get on or off between Briggs Chaney Road & Castle Boulevard and Colesville Road & Spring Street except at Oak Leaf Drive and Prelude Drive. AM trips do not stop at University Blvd.
- Northbound: Customers may not get on or off between Colesville Road & Spring Street and Briggs Chaney Road & Outlet Drive, except at Prelude Drive & Oak Leaf Drive, but can get on and off at University Boulevard.

== History ==
The line was created in 1978 when Silver Spring station opened as the Greencastle-Briggs Chaney Express Line in order to provide express service from Silver Spring to Fairland. Routes Z11 and Z13 will operate between Silver Spring and the Greencastle Park & Ride Lot via Columbia Pike, Castle Boulevard, Colesville Road, Briggs Chaney Road, and Greencastle Road.

Main differences for routes Z11 and Z13 was route Z11 would serve Briggs Chaney Park & Ride, while route Z13 would skip the Briggs Chaney Park & Ride and run along Ballinger Drive, Wexhall Drive, and Greencastle Road while route Z13 skips both the Briggs Chaney Park & Ride and #14000 Castle Boulevard and remains on Ballinger Drive and turn onto Greencastle Road instead.

When the Paul S. Sarbanes Transit Center at Silver Spring station opened, routes Z11 and Z13 were rerouted from its terminus along Wayne Avenue to the new transit center. The Z11, and Z13 were assigned to Bus Bay 108 on level 1.

In 2015, WMATA proposed to combine routes Z9 and Z11 into one route to form a new route Z11. The Z11 would discontinue service along Columbia Pike and instead operate along Old Columbia Pike. Also, the route would be extended to the Burtonsville Crossing Park & Ride Lot via Columbia Pike. This would simplify the express bus along Columbia Pike and the route changes were recommended by the Z Line Metrobus Study from 2014.

On March 27, 2016, route Z11 was extended to the Burtonsville Crossing Park & Ride Lot via Blackburn Road in order to replace routes Z9 and Z29 which were renamed to routes Z7. Route Z11 will operate every 10–15 minutes during the weekday peak-hours with the final trips operating every 20–30 minutes. There were no changes to bus stop locations along Columbia Pike between White Oak and Silver Spring. Buses were also reassigned to Bus Bay 115 on the level 1 at the Paul S. Sarbanes Transit Center in Silver Spring station.

Route Z13 was also discontinued and replaced by the Z11 as the route became redundant to the Z11. The line was renamed to the Burtonsville–Greencastle Express Line as a result of the changes.

In 2016, WMATA proposed to eliminate the Z11 segment between Burtonsville Crossing Park & Ride and Greencastle Park & Ride in order to reduce costs. Service frequency between Greencastle Park & Ride and 1400 Castle Boulevard will be also reduced to operate approximately every 20 minutes. Performance measures goes as follows:

Performance Measures	Route Z11	WMATA Guideline	Pass/Fail
Weekday Daily Riders	903	>432	Pass
Cost Recovery	19.2%	>16.6%	Pass
Subsidy/Rider	$4.74	<$4.81	Pass
Riders per Rev Trip	25.8	>10.7	Pass
Riders per Rev Mile	0.6	>1.3	Pass

- The segment of Route Z11 proposed for elimination has a total of 2 boardings northbound (0.15 per trip) and 32 boardings southbound (2.65 per trip) according to automatic passenger counter data, which are both below the WMATA standard of 10.7. The segment proposed for elimination has a total of 49 offs northbound (3.03 per trip) and 2 offs southbound (0.15) automatic passenger counter data, which are both below the WMATA standard of 10.7.
- The segment of the Route Z11 proposed for reduced frequency has a total of 18 boardings northbound (1.13 per trip) and 178 boardings southbound (9.37) automatic passenger counter data; which are both below the WMATA standard of 10.7. The segment proposed for reduced frequency has a total of 83 offs northbound (5.17 per trip) and 9 offs southbound (0.46 per trip) automatic passenger counter data, which are both below the WMATA standard of 10.7.

In 2019, WMATA proposed to eliminate the Z11 in preparation for the new Ride On Flash BRT service which is expected to be in service in 2020. The Z11 averages 35 trips per day and averages 24 riders per trip.

Montgomery County expressed concerns over the proposed Montgomery County route changes. According to Council Vice President Tom Hucker, residents impact 65,000 residents of the Maryland county. Residents urged WMATA to not cut service as it will cause a lack of transportation towards the residents.

At least 30 Montgomery County leaders called on WMATA not to cut Metrobus routes in the region, saying it will "disproportionately affect" students, seniors, and service workers with no other source of transportation. The letter's signatories include state senators Craig Zucker, Susan Lee, and Cheryl Kagan, Maryland State Delegates Marc Korman, Sara Love, and Julie Palakovich Carr and all nine members of the county council. In a letter to Metro Chairman Paul Smedberg, members of the Montgomery County Council and state delegation said they opposed the cuts, which are part of WMATA's proposed FY 2021 operating budget, and urged the agency to prioritize "maintaining frequent and reliable service." They also quote;

The Metrobus routes currently recommended for service reductions, including the Q, J, L and Z bus lines, provide transportation for many of our most transit-dependent residents," the lawmakers wrote. "Service reductions will disproportionately affect students commuting to Montgomery College, seniors running daily errands and service workers accessing jobs. Roughly 65,000 Montgomery riders use Metrobus on a daily basis, and for many these bus routes are their only source of transportation.

The 35 lawmakers ended the letter by saying cuts to Metrobus service for Montgomery County would counter their "regional goals of reducing traffic congestion and greenhouse gas emissions."

On April 2, 2020, the FY2021 budget was released for WMATA. In about 133 votes from customer feedback for the Z11 changes, 73% of votes were against the changes for Z11 with 15% of votes in favor with the remaining 12% uncertain. Many residents were concern over transfers and travel time. As of the revised proposal released in late March 2020, WMATA still has the Z11 elimination under consideration.

All Z11 service was suspended due to Metro's response to the COVID-19 pandemic. As the Z11 was already on the chopping block, plus the opening of the Flash BRT in October 2020, the Z11 never returned to service and WMATA quietly removed the Z11 from its website and in its September 2020 proposals.
