= Greenbelt–Glenmont Line =

Former bus line operated by the Washington Metropolitan Area Transit Authority

C7, C9
- Greenbelt–Glenmont Line

Overview
- System: Metrobus
- Operator: Washington Metropolitan Area Transit Authority
- Garage: Montgomery
- Livery: Local
- Status: Discontinued
- Began service: September, 2000
- Ended service: June 28, 2009

Route
- Locale: Prince George's County, Montgomery County
- Communities served: Prince George's County: Greenbelt, College Park (C9), Beltsville, Calverton; Montgomery County: Calverton (C7), Westfarm, Fairland, Colesville, Glenmont
- Landmarks served: Greenbelt station, Beltway Plaza Mall (C9), Greenbelt Federal Courthouse (C7), Seven Springs Village Apartments (C9), Cherry Hill Park Campground (C9), Centerpark Office Park (C7), Orchard Shopping Center, Verizon Chesapeake Complex (C7), Glenmont station
- Start: Greenbelt station
- Via: Randolph Road, & Georgia Avenue
- End: Glenmont station
- Length: 60 minutes

Service
- Operates: Weekday Peak Hour Service Only

The Greenbelt–Glenmont Line, designated as Routes C7 & C9, was a former line operated by the Washington Metropolitan Area Transit Authority from September, 2000, all the way up to June 28, 2009, running between both Greenbelt of the Green Line & Glenmont station of the Red Line of the Washington Metro during weekday peak periods. The line mostly provided service between both Prince George's County & Montgomery County before being discontinued in 2009 due to low ridership.

== History ==
C7 originally operated by itself as part of WMATA's former "Twinbrook-Silver Spring" Line from February 19, 1978 & September, 2000. From February 1978 until January 1985, route C7 operated between Silver Spring station & the former E.J. Korvette's Department Store in Rockville, via the Parklawn Building. In January, 1985, route C7 was truncated to only operate between Silver Spring & Twinbrook station, via the Parklawn Building & Grosvenor–Strathmore station.

In September 2000, the Twinbrook-Silver Spring Line was discontinued as it overlaps Metrobus routes Q2, Y5, Y7, Y8, and Y9 along Georgia Avenue between Silver Spring & Wheaton stations, as well as the segment of route C4 routing between Wheaton & Twinbrook stations.

Route C7 was rerouted to operate alongside a brand new Route C9 as part of the brand new "Greenbelt-Glenmont Line".Both routes would operate between Greenbelt & Glenmont stations during rush hours only. The line was created as an experiment by WMATA in order to improve the cross-county Metrobus connections between both Prince George's County & Montgomery County.

Both C7 & C9 would operate on different routing between Greenbelt station and the intersection of Randolph Road & Old Columbia Pike in Fairland. Route C7 would operate along, Edmonston Road, Sunnyside Avenue, Tucker Street, Ewing Road, Rhode Island Avenue, Powder Mill Road, Beltsville Drive, Calverton Boulevard, Broadbirch Drive, Old Columbia Pike, and Randolph Road via Centerpark Office Park in Beltsville, MD and Verizon Chesapeake Complex. Route C9 would operate along Cherrywood Lane, Greenbelt Road, Baltimore Avenue, Cherry Hill Road, & Randolph Road via the Seven Springs Village Apartment Complex and Cherry Hill Park Campground. Both C7 & C9 would then rejoin each other and operate on the exact same routing between the intersection of Randolph Road & Old Columbia Pike in Fairland, MD and Glenmont station, via Randolph Road & Georgia Avenue.

On September 26, 2004, route C7 went through major route changes. While it remain operating on the same route it was on between Greenbelt station & Verizon Chesapeake Complex, it was rerouted to no longer return from the Verizon Chesapeake Complex, onto the intersection of Old Columbia Pike when operating towards Glenmont station but instead operate via Muskgrove Road, Fairland Road, & Tamarack Road, to rejoin route C9 at the intersection of Randolph Road & Tamarack Road.

The changes were made was so that the same level of Metrobus service could be provided on the segment of route Z1 and Z4 routing between the Verizon Chesapeake Complex & Glenmont Metro Station, via Muskgrove Road, Fairland Road, Tamarack Road, Randolph Road, & Georgia Avenue and routes Z7 and Z17 between Centerpark Office Park in Beltsville & the intersection of Tech Road & Industrial Parkway in Fairland, via Beltsville Drive, Calverton Boulevard, & Tech Road, which were all discontinued on September 26, 2004.

Route C9 replaced the segment of route C7's routing on Randolph Road between the intersections of Old Columbia Pike & Tamarack Road in Fairland, MD, and route Z4 routing between the intersection of Randolph Road & Old Columbia Pike and Glenmont station.

During WMATA's Fiscal Year of 2008, it was proposed to eliminate the Greenbelt–Glenmont Line. Montgomery County expressed interest in discontinuing the line and reinvesting resources to improve overcrowding, service reliability and provide additional service on the Z line routes that serves the Route 29 corridor.

At the time of the proposals, route C7 and C9 have been an underperformer in Maryland since September 2000. Service only ran during Weekday Peak Hour periods every 27–37 minutes averaging 330 per day on 24 trips, or an average of 14 passengers per revenue trip with the system average is 32 passengers per revenue trip. The line also runs on 96% of already existing routes.

On June 28, 2009, the Greenbelt–Glenmont Line was eliminated due to low productivity and replaced by various routes.

Route C7's routing between the Greenbelt station and intersection of Sunnyside Avenue & Tucker Road in Beltsville, was taken over by routes 87, 89 & 89M. Service between the intersection of Rhode Island Avenue & Baltimore Avenue & the Centerpark Office Park in Beltsville, was fully taken over by route 86. Service along the intersection of Beltsville Drive & Powder Mill Road in Calverton & intersection of Broadbirch Drive & Plum Orchard Drive in Westfarm, were fully taken over by both routes R2 & R5. Service between the intersection of Calverton Boulevard & Galway Drive in Calverton, MD & the intersection of Tech Road & Columbia Pike in Fairland, was replaced by route Z6. There was no replacement Metrobus service provided along Tucker Road & Ewing Road, or between Calverton Boulevard & Beltsville Drive Westbound which C7 operated on.

Route C9's routing between the Greenbelt station and intersection of Baltimore Avenue & Greenbelt Road, were taken over by routes 81 & C2. Service between Baltimore Avenue and the Cherry Hill Park Campground, via the Seven Springs Village Apartment Complex, were replaced by routes 81, 83, and 86. Routes R2 & R5 replaced route C9 service between the intersections of Powder Mill Road & Broadbirch Drive eastbound only. No replacement Metrobus service was provided on Cherry Hill Road between the Cherry Hill Park Campground and intersection of Powder Mill Road, between Cherry Hill Road between the intersections of Broadbirch Drive & Old Columbia Pike, or between the intersections of Powder Mill Road & Broadbirch Drive Westbound.

Service between the intersection of Randolph Road & Old Columbia Pike and intersection of Randolph Road & New Hampshire Avenue in Colesville, was replaced by Montgomery County Ride On Route 10. The remaining segment of route C7 & C9 routing between the intersection of Randolph Road & New Hampshire Avenue & and Glenmont station, was taken over by route C8.

The C7 and C9 routes were partially replicated and reincarnated during WMATA's Better Bus Redesign in 2025, with new Routes M42 and M44 operating closely to the C7 (Route M44 between Hyattsville Crossing station and Beltsville Drive) and C9 (Route M42 between College Park–University of Maryland station and White Oak Medical Center), with both routes terminating at North Bethesda station.
