= Lakeforest Mall =

Defunct mall in Montgomery County, Maryland, U.S.

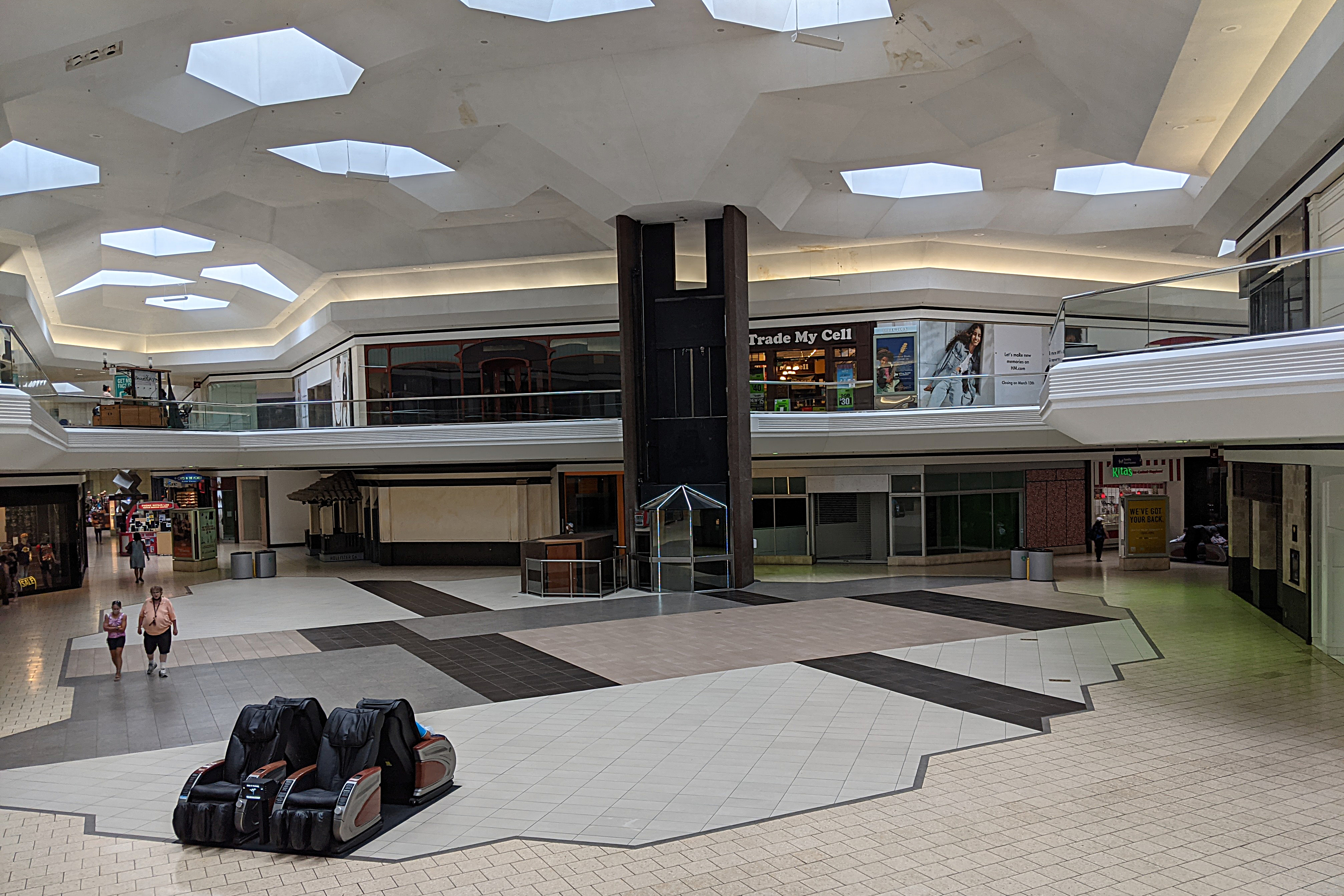
- Center court (August 2021)
- Location: Gaithersburg, Maryland, U.S.
- Coordinates: 39.153524°N 77.204221°W
- Address: 701 Russell Ave.
- Opened: September 12, 1978; 48 years ago
- Closed: March 31, 2023; 3 years ago
- Demolished: June 2025 – June 2026
- Developer: Taubman Centers
- Manager: Petrie Richardson Ventures
- Owner: WRS Inc. Real Estate Investments
- Num. of stores: ≈0 as of March 31, 2023
- Num. of anchor tenants: 4 (at peak)
- Floor area: 1,045,000 square feet (97,000 m^{2})
- Floors: 2 (restricted "Penthouse" 3rd floor in former Lord & Taylor)
- Public transit: Ride On bus: 54, 55, 56, 57, 58, 59, 61, 101
- Website: www.shoplakeforest.com (2016 archive) lakeforestredevelopment.com (Redevelopment)

Lakeforest Mall, originally the Lakeforest Regional Mall, and informally known simply as Lakeforest, was an enclosed shopping mall located in Gaithersburg, Maryland. The property has been owned by WRS Inc. Real Estate Investments as of July 2019, which is in the process of redeveloping the former site.

The mall closed to the public on March 31, 2023. Until 2013, a large children's play area was at the center. Following the closure of three of its four anchor stores, JCPenney, Lord & Taylor, and Sears in December 2019, Macy's remained as the mall's final remaining anchor store until 2023, with the rest of the mall closing shortly after. Following its closure, the mall began demolition in June 2025 and completed demolition one year later to allow for redevelopment into a mixed-use district.

== History ==
=== 1970s ===
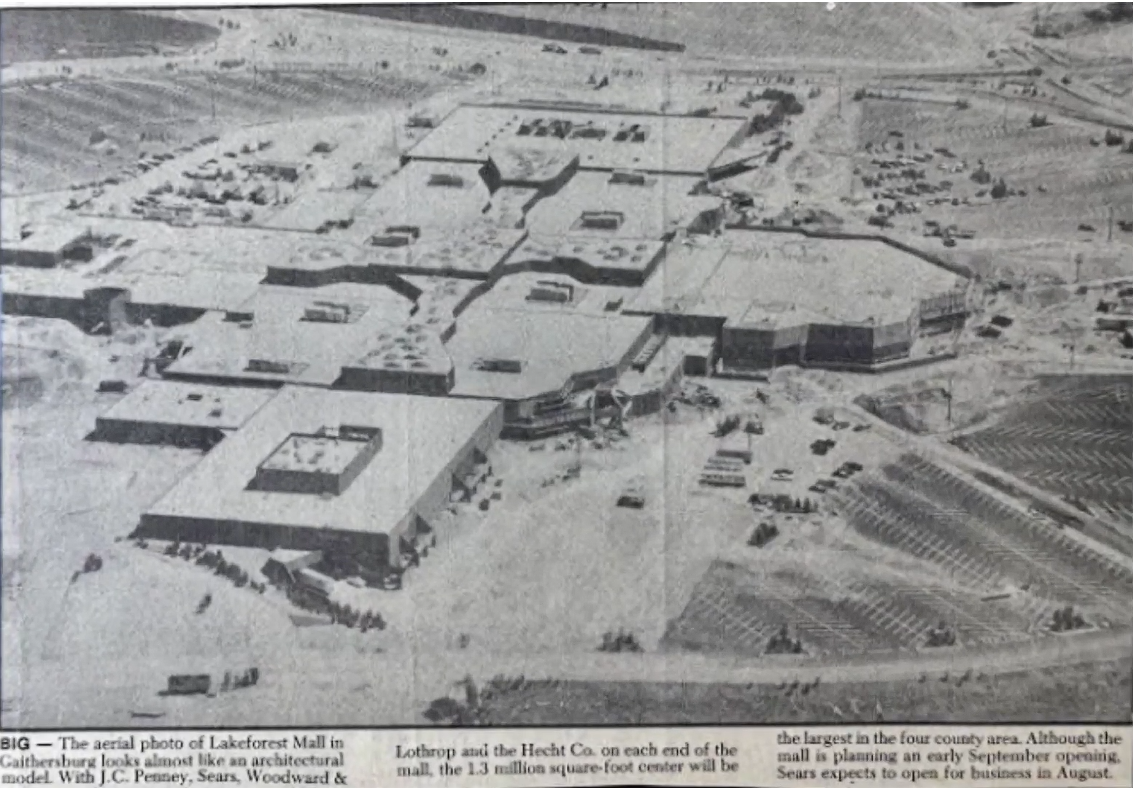
News article about Lakeforest Mall during construction in 1978

Lakeforest Mall first opened on September 12, 1978, as Lakeforest Regional Mall. At that time, the mall's anchor stores were JCPenney, Sears, Woodward & Lothrop, and Hecht's. The mall was named in honor of Lake Walker, a man-made lake and park on the property prior. The mall opened with approximately 30-50 stores, with some of the first stores being relocated from the then nearby indoor Village Mall (now an outdoor strip mall called Montgomery Village Center since circa 1991) and absorbed onto the property. The mall was one of the first in the United States to feature an indoor ice skating rink on the lower level, in the "H section", along with being the biggest indoor shopping mall in the county at the time of grand opening. The rink was replaced, first by a multi theater movie complex, then by a food court, which remained until closing.

=== 1980s ===
In 1984, the ice rink was replaced by a NTI Theaters movie theater, later renamed Cineplex Odeon Lakeforest 5.

=== 1990s ===
Circa 1994, the general manager was Barbara Kreuser. In 1995, the Woodward & Lothrop at the mall closed and was replaced by Lord & Taylor in 1996. Lakeforest was host to a Friendly's and a Long John Silver's during the 1990s; they have since closed down. On August 20, 1998, Taubman Centers sold the property to GM Pension Trust. Circa September 1998, some parking lot space was devoted to become the Lakeforest Transit Center with a Park and Ride.

=== 2000s ===
In January 2000, the Cineplex Odeon Lakeforest 5 movie theater closed. In November 2000, a food court called Cafes in the Forest was introduced where the Cineplex Odeon Lakeforest 5 movie theater once was and started out with nine food businesses, with roughly half a dozen food eateries already in the mall prior to the food court. Several full service restaurants operated in the mall over the years, including Chi-Chi's, Ruby Tuesday (restaurant), Red Robin, and Silver Diner.

In 2004, The Mills Corporation purchased the mall. On May 28, 2006, Macy's replaced Hecht's, which had been acquired by Macy's parent company nationwide. Originally developed, owned and operated by Taubman Centers, the mall had been owned and managed by the Simon Property Group since 2007, when it purchased former owner and manager Mills Corporation. The company defaulted on its mortgage in 2011 and the mall was put up for sale after.

=== 2010s ===
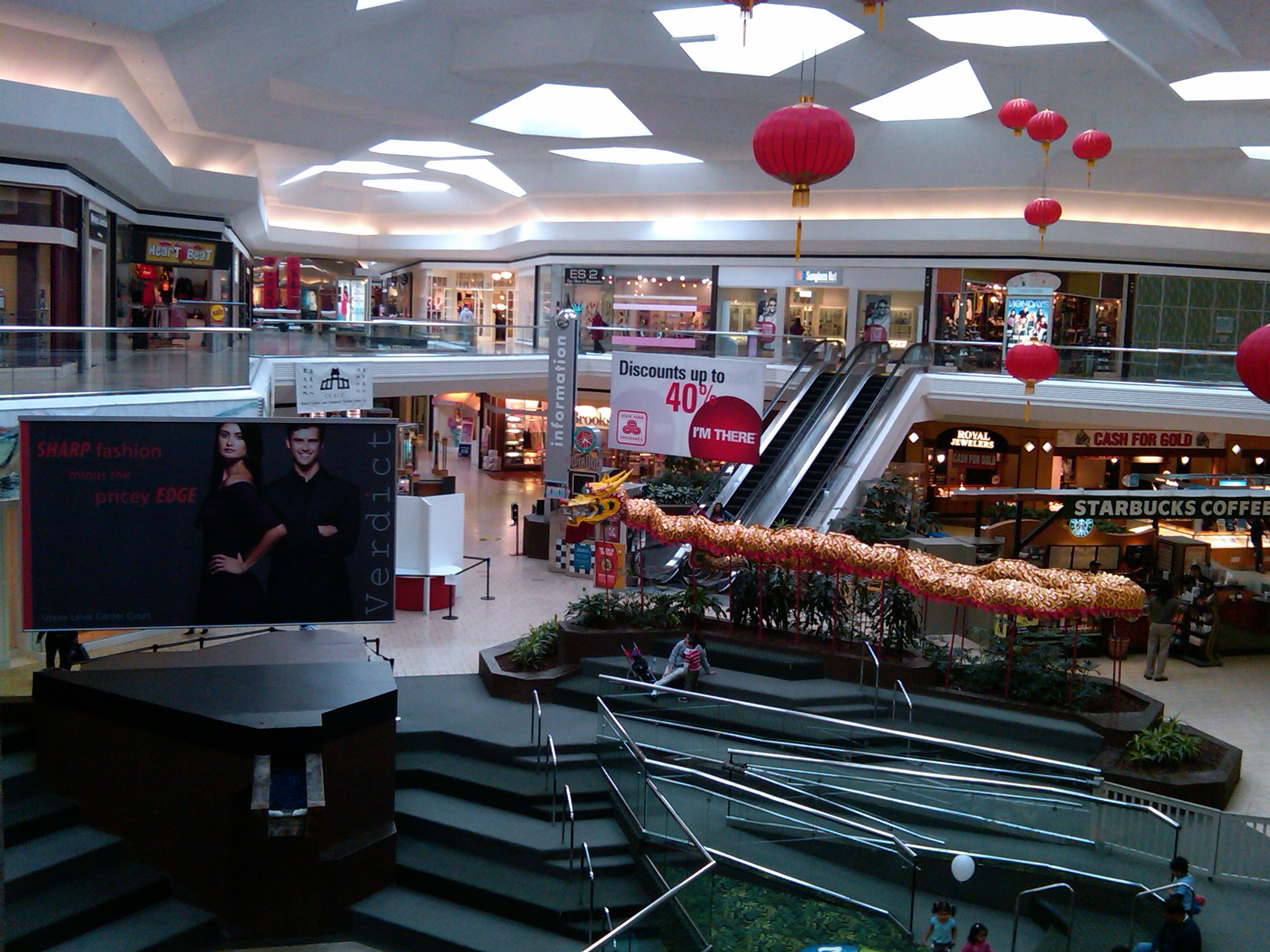
Lakeforest Mall's Center Court in 2010; the depressed carpeted amphitheater area was removed in 2013 and paved over.

In 2011, the mall was home to a miniature train ride that drove around the mall's upper floor. In 2012, the mall took in $14,680,000 in net income. In 2013, Five Mile Capital Partners hired real estate developer Hines to "map out a long-term plan for Lakeforest". A brand new children's play area opened on the ground floor in front of the then JCPenney on July 30, 2013, with the original children's play area called Professor Frog's Courtyard and nearby fountain in the center court were removed and tiled over in August 2013. In 2016, the mall took in $6,180,000 in net income.

On August 22, 2017, Lakeforest Mall was sold at auction for $19.1 million, a fraction of the $100 million price tag from 2012, spurring rumors of possible closure in the future. The auction came after the mall's owner, Five Mile Capital, went into foreclosure. The Annapolis-based Petrie Richardson Ventures has Lakeforest under contract, which would not include the anchor stores in a potential purchase, but as of February 2018 the deal has not been closed.

On February 28, 2019, it was announced that JCPenney would be closing as part of a plan to close 27 stores in the U.S.; the store closed on July 5, 2019. On June 5, 2019, Gaithersburg City Councilmember Ryan Spiegel tweeted that Lord & Taylor was planning to close. The store closed on September 15, 2019, as scheduled. This would leave Macy's and Sears as the only anchor stores remaining in the way of redevelopment considered by the Gaithersburg municipal government.In 2019, WRS Inc. Real Estate Investments purchased the mall from U.S. Bank, which had bought it in 2018. WRS Inc. is planning to redevelop the entire 100 acres (40 ha). On August 31, 2019, it was announced that Sears would be closing its location at Lakeforest Mall as part of a plan to close 92 stores across the U.S.; the store closed on December 1, 2019, leaving Macy's as the last and only anchor.

=== 2020s ===
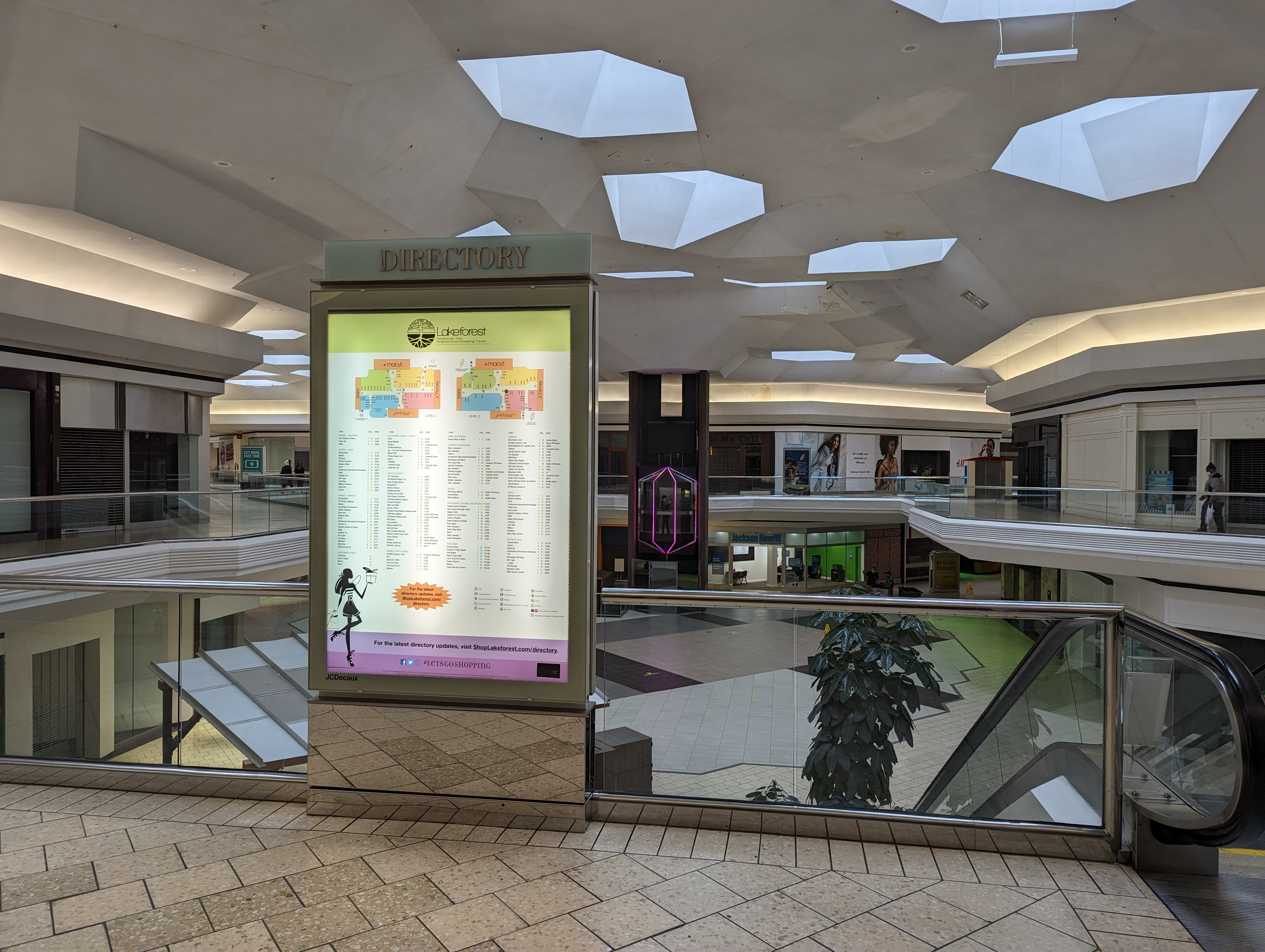
An outdated directory sign on the second floor of the mall in March 2023, on its last day of operation.

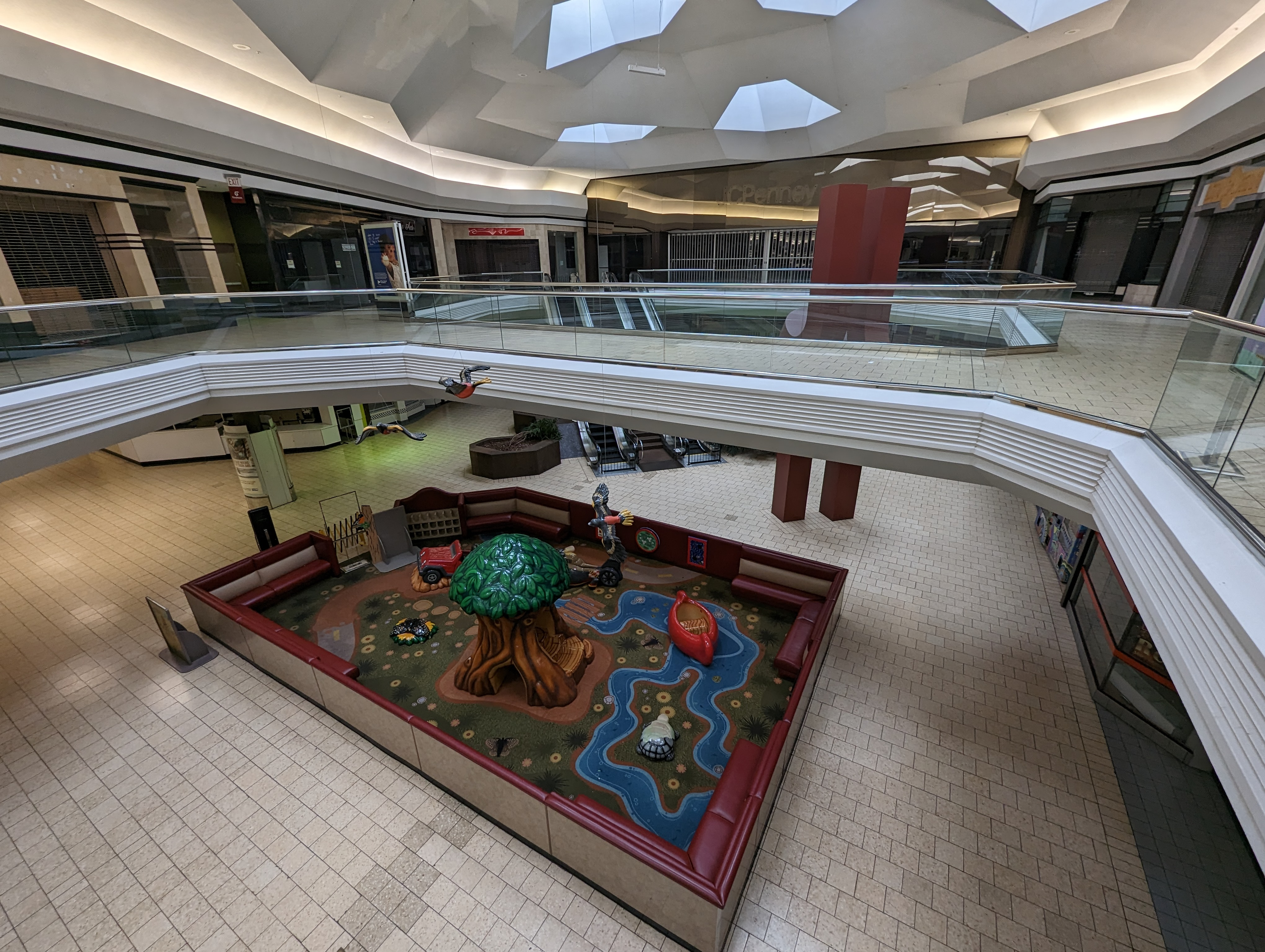
The playground on the first floor of the mall in March 2023, on its last day of operation. It fronts the former JCPenney.

On October 20, 2022, WRS Inc. initially announced that Lakeforest Mall would be demolished by 2024, but the date was changed in 2023. Unfinalized redevelopment proposal plans include relocating the Lakeforest Transit Center and Park and Ride from alongside Lost Knife Rd. to Russell Ave., townhouses, office buildings, a parking garage near the center of brand new stores, a movie theater, cleaning up the three ponds to have a boardwalk built on top, and among others.

On January 4, 2023, it was announced that Macy's would be closed as part of a plan to close 4 stores nationwide, all inside underperforming indoor shopping malls. This left the mall with no anchors, turning it into a dead mall. The store closed on March 18, 2023, via liquidation sales that started on January 9, 2023. On January 17, 2023, at the hearing on the Lakeforest Mall redevelopment plan in City Hall in Gaithersburg, MD, Kevin Rogers of WRS Inc. announced that Lakeforest Mall in its entirety would close on March 31, 2023 at 7:00 PM after 44 years. The land where Lakeforest Mall currently stands will become a mixture of residential, retail, and commercial space.

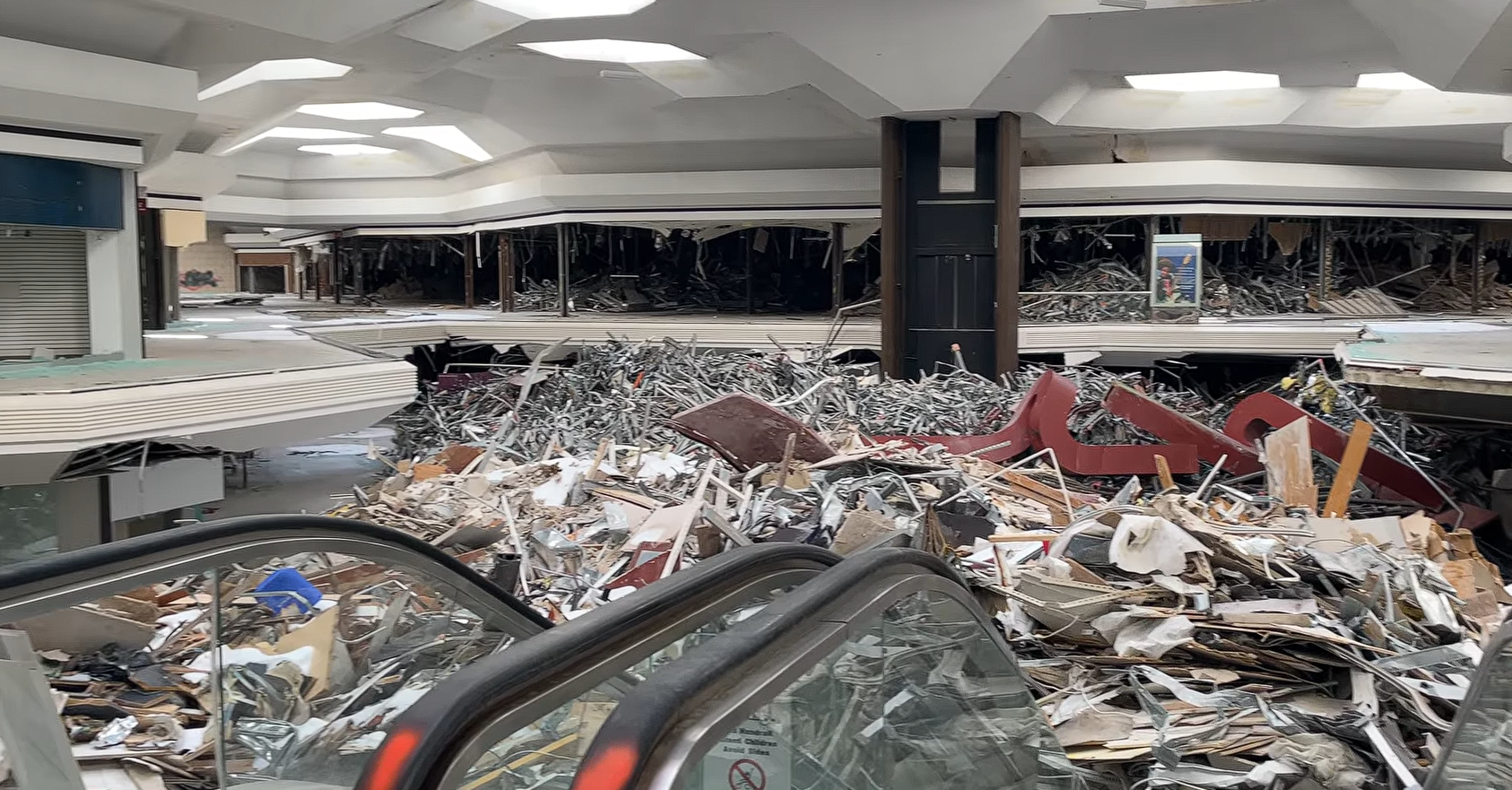
Interior demolition status as of March 31, 2026, three years after the closure.

Interior demolition of the mall began in June 2025, whereas exterior demolition began on April 1, 2026. Demolition was completed on June 9, 2026.

== Gallery ==
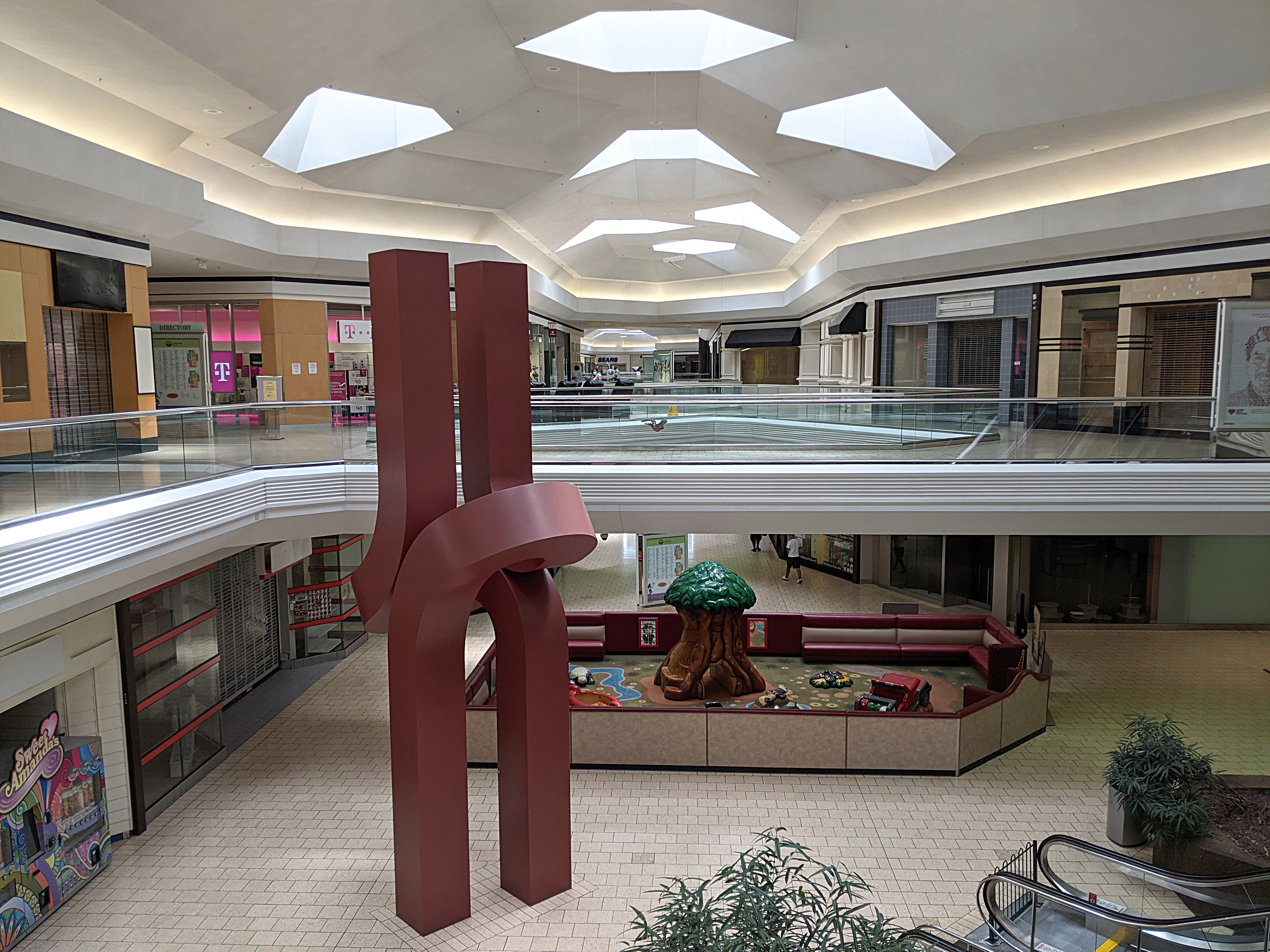
The new children's playground opened in July 2013 in front of the then JCPenney

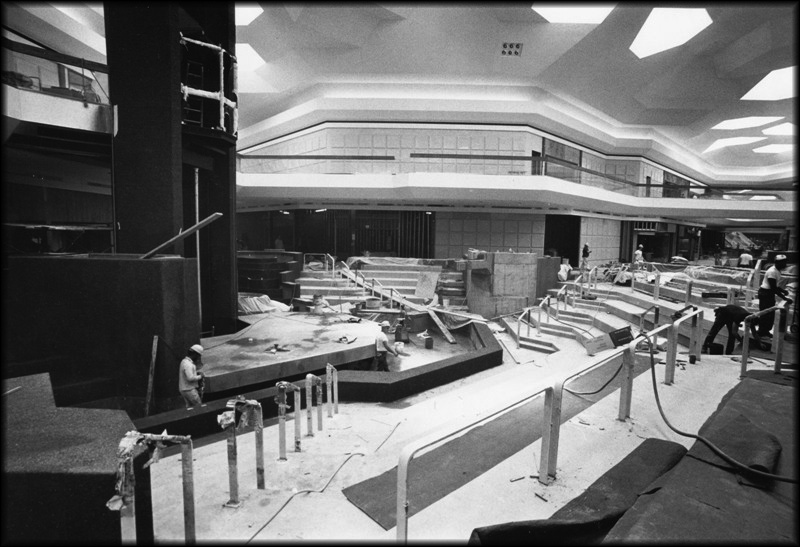
Lakeforest Mall construction in 1978

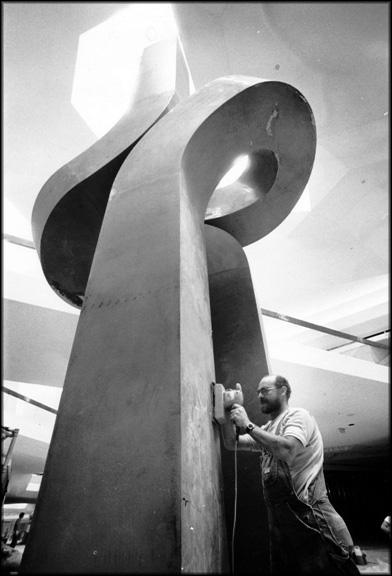
Lakeforest Mall construction in 1978

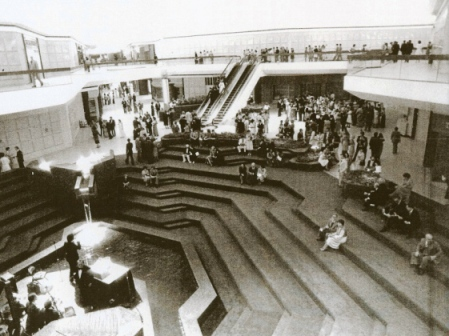
Ceremonies at the grand opening of the mall in 1978; the depressed carpeted amphitheater area in the foreground was filled in and paved over in 2013.

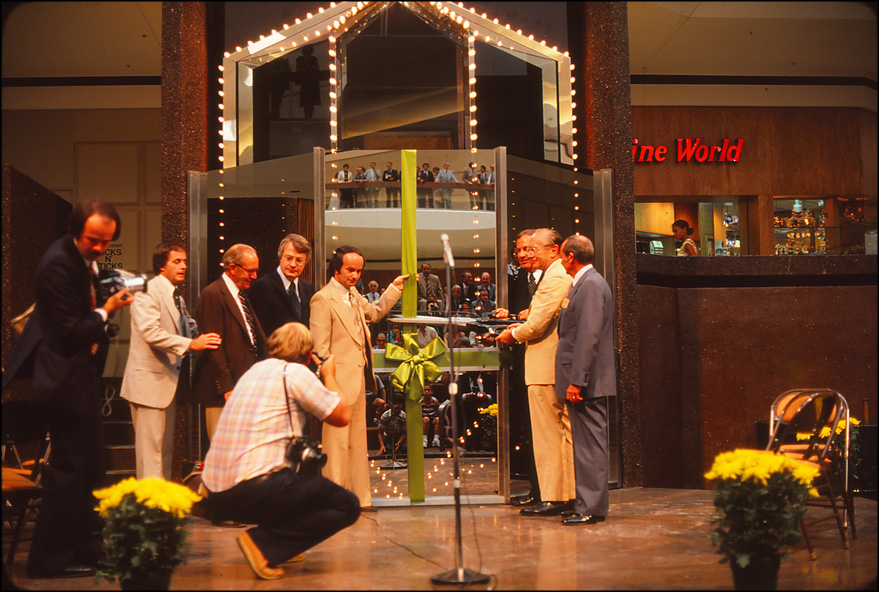
Grand opening of the mall in 1978

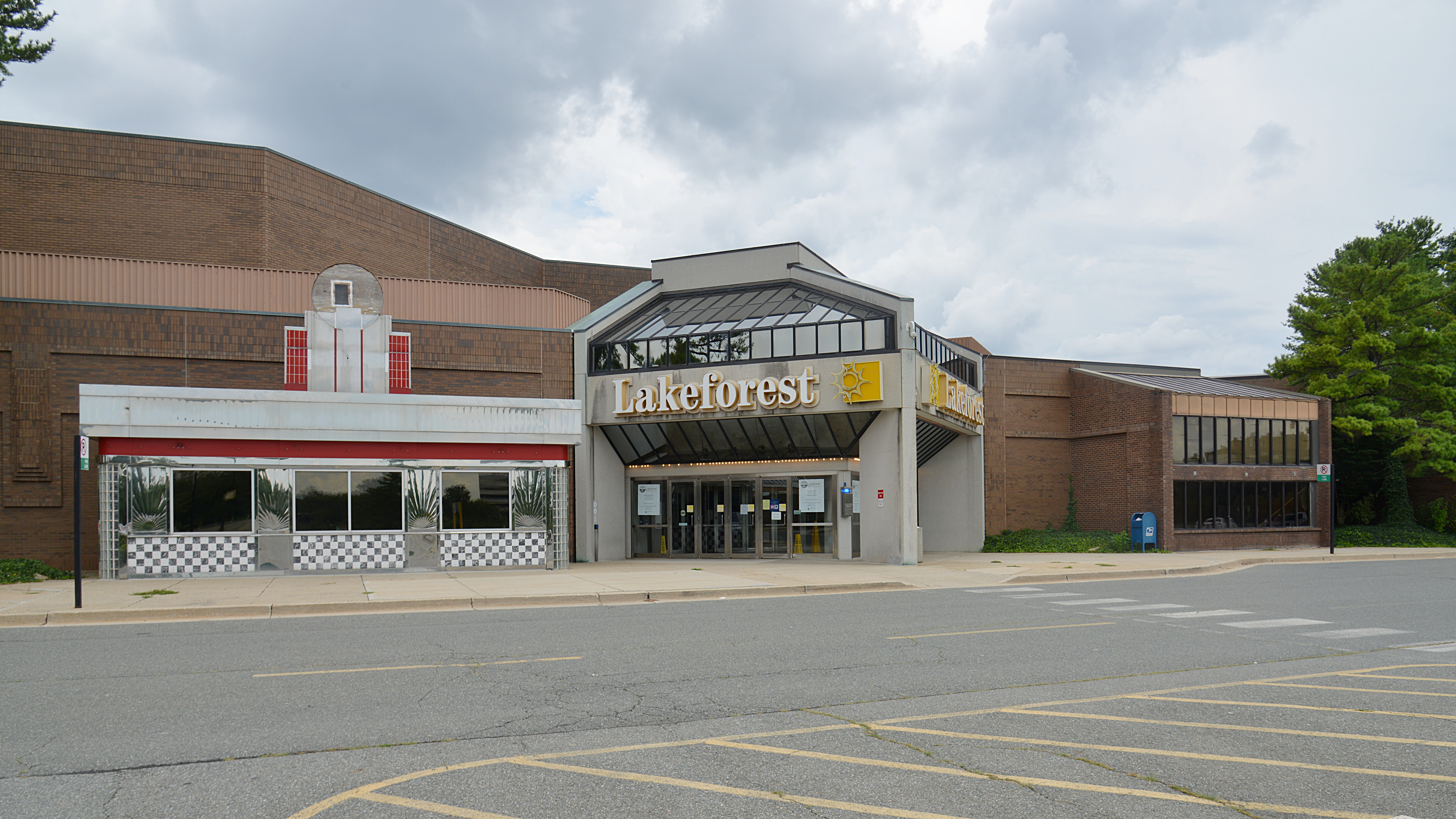
The mall has four entrances for each of the four seasons. This is the Yellow Sun entrance, representing the summer.
