= Baltimore Avenue Line =

Bus route in Washington, D.C., United States

P10, P1X
- Baltimore Avenue; Baltimore Avenue Limited

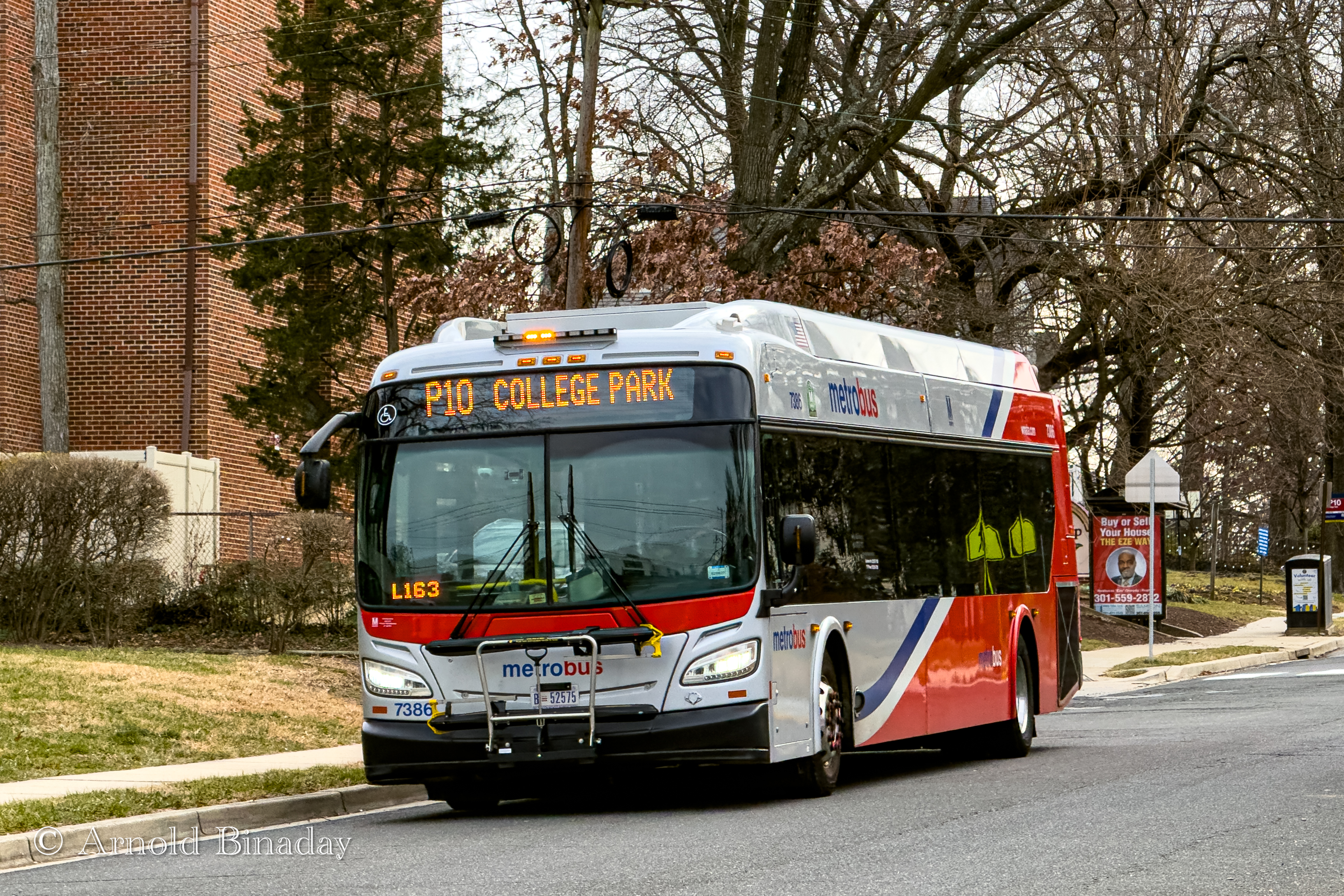
- Route P10 in Hyattsville

Overview
- System: Metrobus
- Operator: Washington Metropolitan Area Transit Authority
- Garage: Landover
- Livery: Local
- Status: Active
- Began service: 81 (1996-1997); 82 (1897); 83 (February 19, 1978); 86 (1973); P10, P1X (June 29, 2025)
- Ended service: 81 (March 27, 2016); 82 (December 22, 2016); 83, 86 (June 28, 2025)
- Predecessors: 82 Streetcar Line (1897-1958); G6 Hyattsville Line (1948 - February 19, 1978)

Route
- Locale: Northeast, Prince George's County
- Communities served: Brentwood, Brookland, Langdon, Woodridge, Mount Rainier, Brentwood, North Brentwood, Hyattsville, Riverdale, University Park, College Park
- Landmarks served: IKEA Way (P1X), College Park station (P10), University of Maryland, College Park, Riverdale Park, Hyattsville Crossing station (P10), The Mall at Prince George's (P10), Hyattsville, Mount Rainier, Rhode Island Avenue station
- Start: Rhode Island Avenue station
- Via: U.S. Route 1, Baltimore Avenue, Rhode Island Avenue
- End: College Park station (P10); IKEA Way (P1X)
- Length: P10: 50 Minutes; P1X: 45 minutes

Service
- Level: Daily
- Frequency: 20–30 minutes
- Operates: 5:00 AM – 12:00 AM
- Ridership: 546,184 (83, FY 2025); 671,085 (86, FY 2025)
- Transfers: SmarTrip only
- Timetable: Baltimore Avenue Line; Baltimore Avenue Limited

The Baltimore Avenue Line, designated as Baltimore Avenue on Route P10, and Baltimore Avenue Limited on Route P1X, are daily bus routes operated by the Washington Metropolitan Area Transit Authority between Rhode Island Avenue station, which is served by Red Line of the Washington Metro, and College Park station (P10), which is served by Green and Yellow Lines of the Washington Metro or IKEA Way (P1X) in College Park, Maryland. Both routes mainly operate on the U.S. Route 1 corridor between Rhode Island Avenue in Northeast Washington, D.C. and College Park, Maryland. Route P10 trips are roughly 50 minutes long and route P1X trips are roughly 45 minutes long.

== Route ==
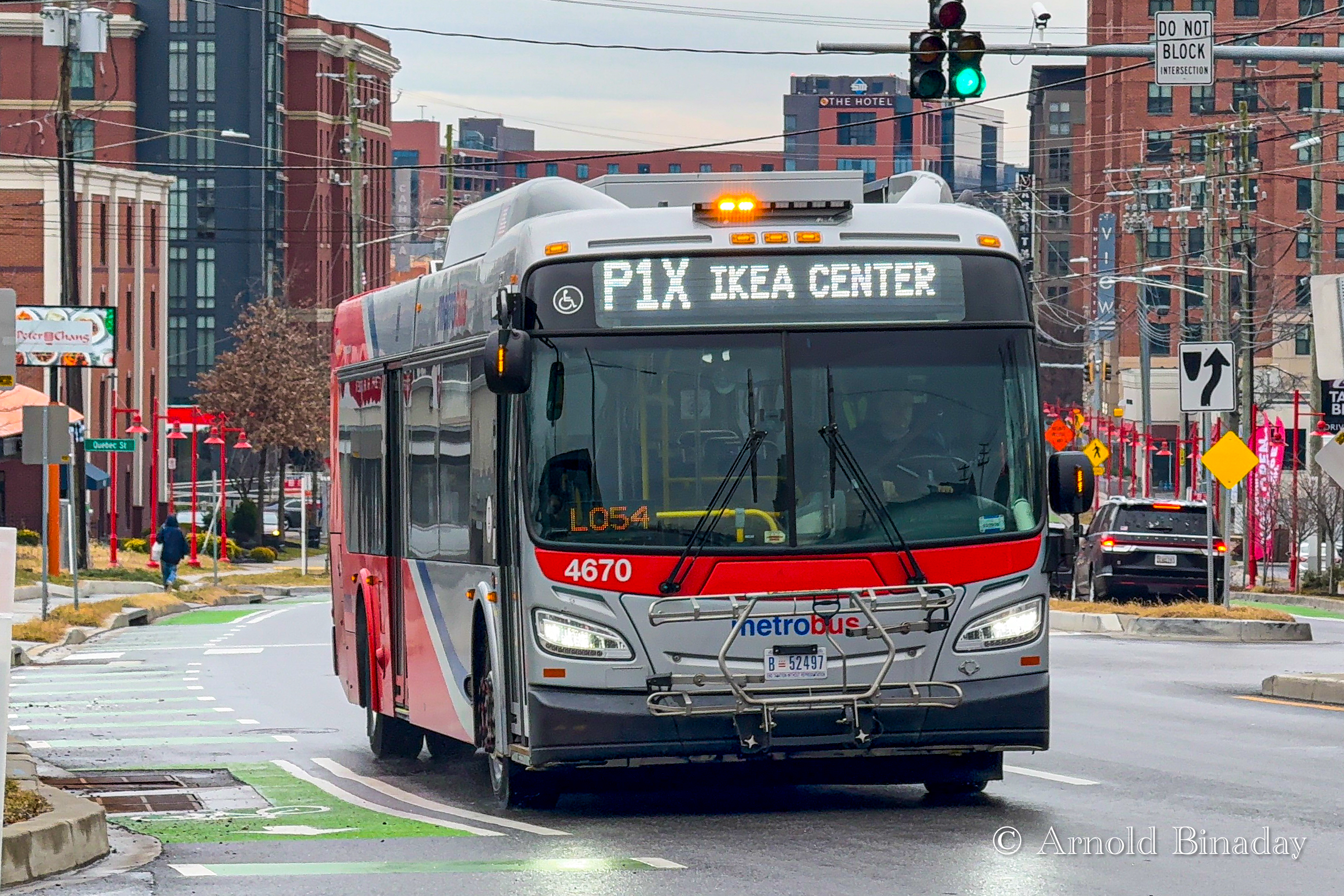
Route P1X along Baltimore Avenue

Both the P10 and P1X operate out of Landover division. The P10 runs local while the P1X runs express. Route P10 operates every 30 minutes between 5:00 AM and 12:00 AM, while Route P1X operates every 20 minutes between 5:30 AM and 12:00 AM.

The former 83 and 86 also operated out of Landover division seven days a week. Both 83 and 86 originally operated out of Bladensburg Division up until June 2019, when they were shifted to make room for other routes at Bladensburg Division when Northern division closed due to structure failures. During the week, Route 83 operated every 30–60 minutes between 4:35 AM and 11:20 PM, while Route 86 operated every 30–60 minutes between 5:00 AM and 10:50 PM. On Saturdays, the 83 provides service on a 60-minute headway from 5:35 AM to 11:00 PM, while the 86 provides service also on a 60-minute headway from 7:03 AM to 11:28 PM. On Sundays, the 83 ran from 6:35 AM until 8:20 PM and the 86 ran from 7:03 AM until 7:50 PM every hour.

=== Route P10 stops ===
Bus stop	Direction	Connections
Northeast Washington, D.C.
Rhode Island Avenue station Bus Bay E	Northbound station, Southbound terminal	Metrobus: D32, D36, D74, P1X, P40; Metropolitan Branch Trail; Washington Metro:
Rhode Island Avenue NE / 10th Street NE	Northbound	Metrobus: D32, D36, D74
Rhode Island Avenue NE / 12th Street NE	Bidirectional	Metrobus: D32, D36, D74, P1X, P40
Rhode Island Avenue NE / 13th Street NE	Southbound	Metrobus: D32
Rhode Island Avenue NE / Brentwood Road NE	Bidirectional	Metrobus: D32, P1X, P40
Rhode Island Avenue NE / Montana Avenue NE	Northbound	Metrobus: D32, P1X, P40
Rhode Island Avenue NE / 15th Street NE	Southbound	Metrobus: C63, D32
Rhode Island Avenue NE / Franklin Street NE	Northbound	Metrobus: C63, D32
Rhode Island Avenue NE / 17th Street NE	Bidirectional	Metrobus: D32
Rhode Island Avenue NE / 18th Street NE	Bidirectional	Metrobus: C71, D32, P1X, P40
Rhode Island Avenue NE / 20th Street NE	Bidirectional	Metrobus: D32
Rhode Island Avenue NE / Thayer Street NE	Bidirectional	Metrobus: D32
Rhode Island Avenue NE / South Dakota Avenue NE	Northbound	Metrobus: D32, P1X, P40
Rhode Island Avenue NE / 24th Street NE	Southbound	Metrobus: D32, P1X, P40
Rhode Island Avenue NE / Monroe Street NE	Bidirectional	
Rhode Island Avenue NE / Newton Street NE	Bidirectional	Metrobus: P1X, P40
Rhode Island Avenue NE / Eastern Avenue	Bidirectional	Metrobus: C41, P1X, P40, P42
Prince George's County, Maryland
Rhode Island Avenue / 34th Street	Southbound	Metrobus: C41, P1X, P40
Rhode Island Avenue / Municipal Place	Northbound	Metrobus: C41, P1X, P40
Rhode Island Avenue / 37th Street	Bidirectional	Metrobus: C41, P1X, P40
Rhode Island Avenue / 38th Street	Southbound	Metrobus: C41; TheBus: P43
Rhode Island Avenue / 39th Street	Northbound	Metrobus: C41; TheBus: P43
Rhode Island Avenue / Shepherd Street	Southbound	
Rhode Island Avenue / Bunker Hill Road	Northbound	
Rhode Island Avenue / Volta Avenue	Bidirectional	Metrobus: P1X
Rhode Island Avenue / Webster Street	Bidirectional	
Rhode Island Avenue / Wallace Road	Bidirectional	
Rhode Island Avenue / 41st Street	Southbound	Metrobus: P1X
Rhode Island Avenue / Charles Armentrout Drive	Northbound	Metrobus: P1X
Rhode Island Avenue / 42nd Place	Bidirectional	
Rhode Island Avenue / County Service Building	Bidirectional	Metrobus: P1X
Rhode Island Avenue / Gallatin Street	Bidirectional	
Rhode Island Avenue / Hamilton Street	Southbound	Metrobus: P1X
Jefferson Street / 44th Avenue	Bidirectional	
Jefferson Street / 43rd Avenue	Bidirectional	
42nd Avenue / Jefferson Street	Bidirectional	
42nd Avenue / Madison Street	Southbound	
42nd Avenue / Nicholson Street	Northbound	
42nd Avenue / Oglethorpe Street	Bidirectional	
42nd Avenue / Oliver Street	Bidirectional	
42nd Avenue / Queensbury Road	Bidirectional	Metrobus: P30, P35
Queensbury Road / 41st Avenue	Bidirectional	Metrobus: P30, P35
Belcrest Road / Queens Chapel Road	Bidirectional	Metrobus: P30, P33, P35; TheBus: P43
Hyattsville Crossing station Bus Bays D and G	Bidirectional	Metrobus: M12, M44, P30, P32, P33, P35; TheBus: P43; Shuttle-UM: 113; Washington Metro:
East-West Highway / Belcrest Road	Northbound	Metrobus: M12, M44, P32, P33; Shuttle-UM: 113
East West Highway / Queens Chapel Road	Northbound	Metrobus: M44
East West Highway / Adelphi Road	Southbound	Metrobus: M44
East West Highway / 42nd Avenue	Bidirectional	Metrobus: M44
East West Highway / 43rd Street	Northbound	Metrobus: M44
East West Highway / 44th Avenue	Southbound	Metrobus: M44
Baltimore Avenue / Sheridan Street	Northbound	Metrobus: M44, P1X
Baltimore Avenue / Tuckerman Street	Southbound	Metrobus: M44, P1X
Baltimore Avenue / Underwood Street	Bidirectional	Metrobus: M44, P1X
Baltimore Avenue / Van Buren Street	Bidirectional	Metrobus: M44, P1X
Baltimore Avenue / Queens Chapel Road	Southbound	Metrobus: M44, P1X
Baltimore Avenue / Amherst Road	Northbound	Metrobus: M44, P1X
Baltimore Avenue / Fordham Lane	Southbound	Metrobus: M44, P1X
College Park, Maryland
Baltimore Avenue / Guilford Road	Bidirectional	Metrobus: M44, P1X
Baltimore Avenue / Hartwick Road	Bidirectional	Metrobus: M44, P1X
Baltimore Avenue / Knox Road	Northbound	Metrobus: M44, P1X
Baltimore Avenue / Regents Drive	Southbound	Metrobus: M44, P1X
Baltimore Avenue / Rossborough Lane	Bidirectional	Metrobus: M44, P1X; MTA: Purple Line (at Baltimore Avenue-College Park-UMD station)(Planned)
Baltimore Avenue / Campus Drive	Bidirectional	Metrobus: M44, P1X
Campus Drive / Baltimore Avenue	Northbound	Metrobus: M42, P1X, P31; TheBus: P37; Shuttle-UM
Campus Drive / Paint Branch Trail	Bidirectional	Metrobus: M42, P31; TheBus: P37; Shuttle-UM
College Park station Bus Bay F	Bidirectional	Metrobus: M42, P14, P31; RTA: 302/G; TheBus: P37; Shuttle-UM: 104, 109; MTA Maryland: 204; Washington Metro: MARC: Camden Line; MTA: Purple Line (Planned)

=== Route P1X stops ===
Bus stop	Direction	Connections
Northeast Washington, D.C.
Rhode Island Avenue station Bus Bay D	Northbound station, Southbound terminal	Metrobus: D32, D36, D74, P10, P40; Metropolitan Branch Trail; Washington Metro:
Rhode Island Avenue NE / 12th Street NE	Bidirectional	Metrobus: D32, D36, D74, P10, P40
Rhode Island Avenue NE / Brentwood Road NE	Southbound	Metrobus: D32, P10, P40
Rhode Island Avenue NE / Montana Avenue NE	Northbound	Metrobus: D32, P10, P40
Rhode Island Avenue NE / 18th Street NE	Bidirectional	Metrobus: C71, D32, P10, P40
Rhode Island Avenue NE / South Dakota Avenue NE	Northbound	Metrobus: D32, P10, P40
Rhode Island Avenue NE / 24th Street NE	Southbound	Metrobus: D32, P10, P40
Rhode Island Avenue NE / Newton Street NE	Bidirectional	Metrobus: P10, P40
Rhode Island Avenue NE / Eastern Avenue	Bidirectional	Metrobus: C41, P10, P40, P42
Prince George's County, Maryland
Rhode Island Avenue / 34th Street	Southbound	Metrobus: C41, P10, P40
Rhode Island Avenue / Municipal Place	Northbound	Metrobus: C41, P10, P40
Rhode Island Avenue / 37th Street	Bidirectional	Metrobus: C41, P10, P40
Rhode Island Avenue / Volta Avenue	Bidirectional	Metrobus: P10
Rhode Island Avenue / 41st Street	Southbound	Metrobus: P10
Rhode Island Avenue / Charles Armentrout Drive	Northbound	Metrobus: P10
Rhode Island Avenue / County Service Building	Bidirectional	Metrobus: P10
Rhode Island Avenue / Hamilton Street	Bidirectional	Metrobus: P10
Baltimore Avenue / Longfellow Street	Bidirectional	
Baltimore Avenue / Oglethorpe Street	Bidirectional	
Baltimore Avenue / Riverdale Road	Bidirectional	
Baltimore Avenue / Queensbury Road	Southbound	Metrobus: P30, P35
Baltimore Avenue / East-West Highway	Northbound	Metrobus: P30, P35
Baltimore Avenue / Sheridan Street	Northbound	Metrobus: M44, P10
Baltimore Avenue / Tuckerman Street	Southbound	Metrobus: M44, P10
Baltimore Avenue / Underwood Street	Bidirectional	Metrobus: M44, P10
Baltimore Avenue / Van Buren Street	Bidirectional	Metrobus: M44, P10
Baltimore Avenue / Amherst Road	Northbound	Metrobus: M44, P10
Baltimore Avenue / Queens Chapel Road	Southbound	Metrobus: M44, P10
Baltimore Avenue / Fordham Lane	Southbound	Metrobus: M44, P10
College Park, Maryland
Baltimore Avenue / Guilford Road	Bidirectional	Metrobus: M44, P10
Baltimore Avenue / Hartwick Road	Bidirectional	Metrobus: M44, P10
Baltimore Avenue / Knox Road	Northbound	Metrobus: M44, P10
Baltimore Avenue / Regents Drive	Southbound	Metrobus: M44, P10
Baltimore Avenue / Rossborough Lane	Bidirectional	Metrobus: M44, P10; MTA: Purple Line (at Baltimore Avenue-College Park-UMD station) (Planned)
Baltimore Avenue / Campus Drive	Bidirectional	Metrobus: M44, P10
Baltimore Avenue / Lakeland Road	Bidirectional	Metrobus: M42, M44, P32
Baltimore Avenue / Berwyn House Road	Northbound	Metrobus: M42, M44, P32
Baltimore Avenue / Navahoe Street	Southbound	Metrobus: M42, M44, P32
Baltimore Avenue / Quebec Street	Bidirectional	Metrobus: M42, M44, P32
Baltimore Avenue / Berwyn Road	Bidirectional	Metrobus: M42, M44, P32
Baltimore Avenue / Metzerott Road	Southbound	Metrobus: M42, M44, P32
Baltimore Avenue / University Boulevard	Northbound	Metrobus: M44
Baltimore Avenue / Cherokee Street	Bidirectional	Metrobus: M44
Baltimore Avenue / Erie Street	Bidirectional	Metrobus: M44
Baltimore Avenue / Indian Lane	Bidirectional	Metrobus: M44
Baltimore Avenue / Hollywood Road	Bidirectional	Metrobus: M44
Baltimore Avenue / Cherry Hill Road	Bidirectional	Metrobus: M42, M44
Baltimore Avenue / IKEA Center Boulevard	Southbound	Metrobus: M44
IKEA Way / Bus Bay 1	Northbound	Metrobus: M44
IKEA Way / Bus Bay 2	Northbound	
IKEA Way / Bus Bay 3	Southbound station, Northbound terminal	

== History ==
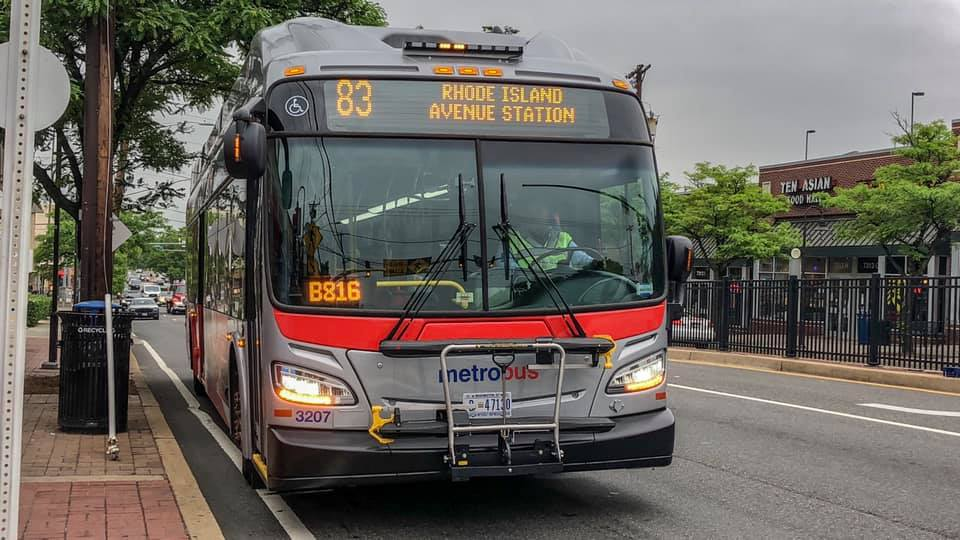
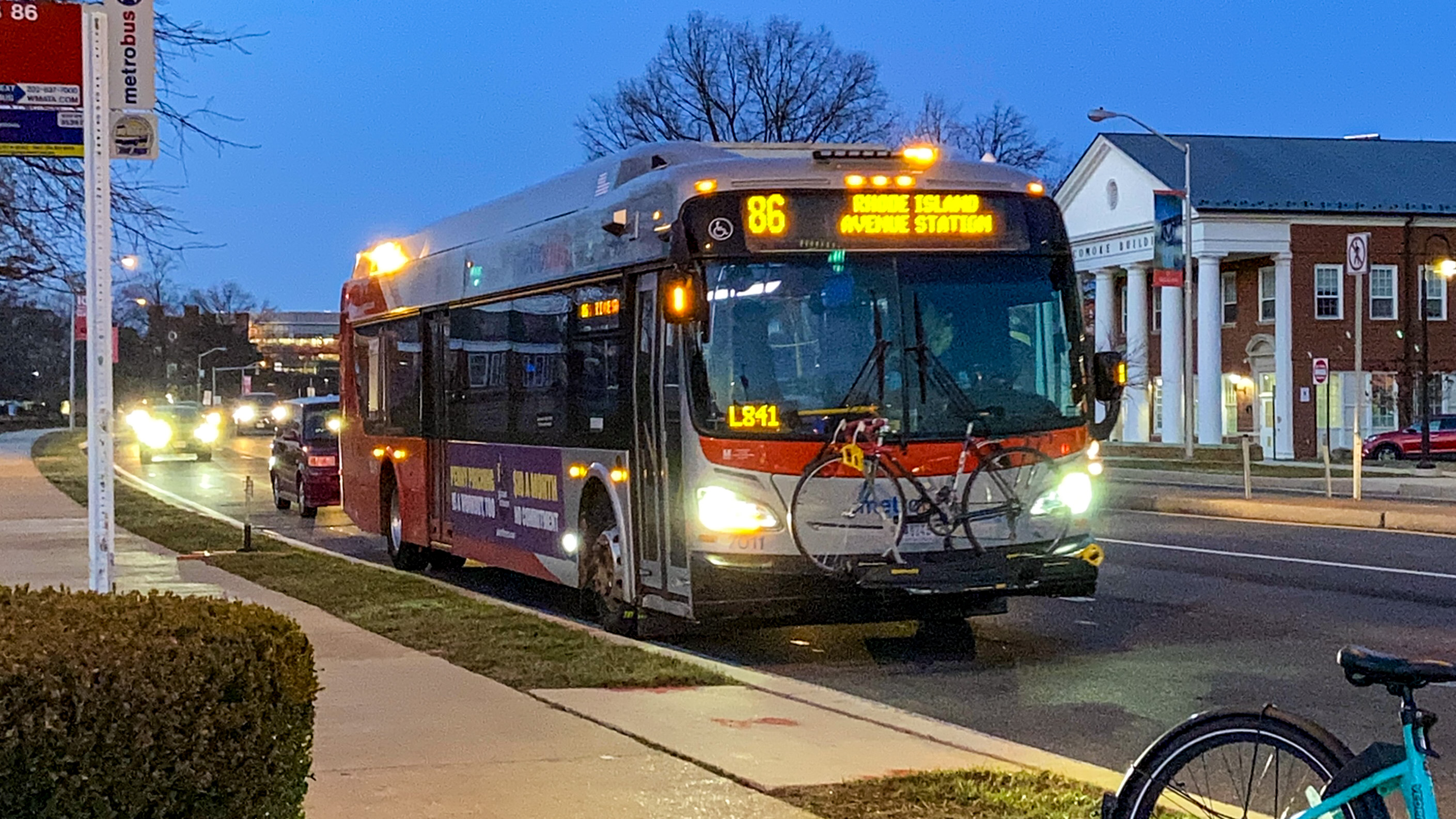
Former Routes 83 and 86 in College Park

=== Background ===
==== Route 82 ====
The 82 Streetcar Line, which operated as part of the former Capital Transit Company (CTC) Maryland Line streetcar route operated between Potomac Park and Branchville. It began operation in 1897. In 1958, the 82 Streetcar Line was converted into a DC Transit Bus Route, as Capital Transit Company (CTC) was renamed as, "DC Transit System" (DCTS) and each of the streetcar lines throughout the DC Area were getting replaced by buses. 82 was the original bus route of the Maryland Line. Later around 1961, DC Transit Bus Route 82, was extended north of its Branchville terminus, to Hollywood, via Rhode Island Avenue, Lackawanna Street, 53rd Avenue, 52nd Place, and Rhode Island Avenue. Then, around 1968, 82 was extended to the Seven Springs Village Apartment Complex (Hollywood) on Cherry Hill Road in College Park, Maryland, via Edgewood Road, Baltimore Avenue, and Cherry Hill Road. The line was eventually taken over by WMATA and officially became a Metrobus route on February 4, 1973, when WMATA acquired DC Transit.

==== Route 84 ====
The 84 operated as part of the Maryland Streetcar Line as an extension of the 82 Streetcar Line between Branchville and Beltsville from 1902 up until 1949 when it was ultimately discontinued. Eventually around 1973, when the WMATA Metrobus System was formed, the 84 was brought back to operate on the Maryland Line between Potomac Park and East Pines, operating parallel to Routes 82, 86, and 88 between Potomac Park and Mount Rainier, then via the former DC Transit East Riverdale-Cheverly Line Route B4's routing between Mount Rainier and East Pines, when the B4 got discontinued. The 84 eventually stopped operating as part of the Maryland Line on December 3, 1978, when it got split off into its own separate Metrobus Route named the Rhode Island Avenue–New Carrollton Line, operating between Rhode Island Avenue station and New Carrollton station.

==== Routes 86 and 88 ====
Both the 86 and 88 were created around 1973 when WMATA's Metrobus System was formed. The 86 originally operated between Potomac Park and Riverdale, mostly following 82 and 84's routing, only except diverting off Baltimore Avenue onto the intersection of Riverdale Road and then operating via Rhode Island Avenue and Queensbury Road to reach its Riverdale terminus, which is currently where Riverdale Park Town Center station is located.

The 88 follows the 82, 84, and 86's routing between Potomac Park and Mount Rainier, then operating via the former DC Transit East Riverdale-Cheverly Line Route B6 and B8's routing between Mount Rainier and Cheverly, when the B6 and B8 both got discontinued. The B6 and B8 operated on almost the same routing between Mount Rainier and Cheverly, only with the exception that B8 would divert off Landover Road to serve the Prince George's Hospital, before operating to Cheverly. The 88 followed B8's diversion off Landover Road to serve the Prince George's Hospital. Route 88 was ultimately discontinued on December 3, 1978, when Cheverly station opened and its routing between Mount Rainier and Cheverly was replaced by Route F2.

=== Later History ===
On March 27, 1976, Routes 82, 84, 86, and 88 were rerouted to divert off the intersection of Rhode Island Avenue NE to serve the newly opened Rhode Island Avenue station.

On February 19, 1978, 83 was created as a brand new Metrobus Route to operate parallel to 82 between Potomac Park and Hollywood, except making limited stops to provide a speedier trip during weekday rush hour/peak period times.

During this same time, the 86 was rerouted to operate between Potomac Park and College Park, to replace the former Route G6 Hyattsville Line routing between Mount Rainier and College Park when the G6 was rerouted to operate as part of the Rhode Island Avenue Line alongside Route G4 between Avondale and Metro Center station. The 86 would retain its original routing between Potomac Park and the intersection of Rhode Island Avenue & 38th Street in Brentwood, then operate via 38th Street, Hamilton Street, 40th Avenue, Oglethorpe Street, 42nd Avenue, Queensbury Road, Belcrest Road, Prince George's Plaza, East-West Highway, Queens Chapel Road, Baltimore Avenue, College Avenue, Dartmouth Avenue, Calvert Road, and Rhode Island Avenue.

On September 24, 1978, as Metrorail Service increased its frequency, Routes 82, 83, 84, 86, and 88 were truncated to only operate up to Rhode Island Avenue station, The B6 was created as a brand new Metrobus Route to operate as part of WMATA's Eckington Line between the Rhode Island Avenue station and Metro Center, to provide alternative service to the 82, 83, 84, and 86 Metrobus Routes between the Rhode Island Avenue station and Downtown Washington D.C. despite not operating up to Potomac Park.

The 88 was eventually discontinued on December 3, 1978 shortly after the Cheverly Station opened. The 84 was split off into its separate line named the Rhode Island Avenue–New Carrollton Line, after route 84 was extended from Riverdale (East Pines), to operate to the newly opened New Carrollton station.

In August 1988, when Queens Chapel Road was closed along East-West Highway in University Park to make room for the construction of the underground Green Line tracks, the 86 was rerouted to no longer operate on Queens Chapel Road and operate along East-West Highway itself to Baltimore Avenue. The reroute eventually became permanent due to the wishes of University Park residents.

In October 1989, when the Cherry Hill Park Campground opened, routes 82 and 83 were rerouted to operate to Cherry Hill Park via the Seven Springs Apartments Complex. Also the 82 and 83's former Hollywood Loop north of Rhode Island Avenue and Edgewood Road in College Park was eliminated.

On December 11, 1993, when the Green Line extension Greenbelt opened, Route 82 was truncated to only operate on short trips between the Rhode Island Avenue station and Mount Rainier during early morning, late night, and PM rush hours only eliminating service to Cherry Hill. Route 83 would replace the 82 and operating the same routing as the 82 except it would serve the newly opened Greenbelt station in between via Greenbelt Road and Cherrywood Lane.

Route 86 was also extended from its College Park terminus at the intersection of Dartmouth Avenue & Knox Road, to operate further north up to Centerpark Office Park (Calverton), to replace the segment of route R2's former routing between the intersection of Baltimore Avenue & Campus Drive (University of Maryland) and Calverton, via Baltimore Avenue, Rhode Island Avenue, Powder Mill Road, and Beltsville Drive, which was discontinued. Route 86 was also rerouted off Belcrest Road to serve the newly opened Prince George's Plaza (now Hyattsville Crossing) station.

Between 1996 and 1997, Route 81 was shifted from the North Capitol Street Line to operate as part of the Maryland Line between Rhode Island Avenue station and Cherry Hill via Greenbelt station, to simply operate as a variant of Route 83's routing, as 83 was rerouted to serve College Park–University of Maryland station via Baltimore Avenue, Paint Branch Parkway, and River Road, instead of serving Greenbelt station.

On January 13, 2001, the line was renamed as the College Park Line.

On May 15, 2003, the original bus bays at Prince George's Plaza Shopping Center were closed to build a new Target store. As a result, route 86 and other routes stopped directly entering and looping inside Prince George's Plaza.

On June 27, 2004, route 86 was rerouted at the request of the city of College Park to directly serve the College Park–University of Maryland station by operating along the 83's routing along Baltimore Avenue, Paint Branch Parkway, and River Road instead of operating along College Ave, Dartmouth Ave, and Calvert Road.

Due to the construction of a new curb next to the new Mosaic Apartments built right next to Prince George's Plaza station around May to June 2007, all Metrobus Routes that have previously exited Prince George's Plaza station from the northbound side had to do so by exiting Prince George's Plaza via a right turn onto East-West Highway and left onto Belcrest Road. Route 86 was in the direction of Calverton to exit Prince George's Plaza station northbound, right onto East-West Highway, and remain straight on East-West Highway to past Belcrest Road but was able to keep its entire routing in the direction of Rhode Island Avenue–Brentwood station the same as the route was still allowed to turn left from East-West Highway onto Belcrest Road, make a right turn from Belcrest Road to enter Prince George's Plaza station, and make a right turn southbound on Belcrest Road.

On August 25, 2011, WMATA added a new route to the College Park Line called "83X" as a pilot route during the summer to provide additional direct service from Cherry Hill Campground to College Park–U of MD station operating four weekdays trips only from 8:30 am to 10:00 am only from the third Monday in June through the second Friday through August.

During WMATA's Fiscal Year of 2015, WMATA proposed to split Route 83 and 86 into four routes. Route 83 and 86 would terminate at College Park station from Rhode Island Avenue station and be renamed Route 83S and 86S or keep their same names. The second portion was to be named Route 83N and 86N or Route R6 and R8 and will operate between College Park station and Cherry Hill (83N/R6) and Calverton (86N/R8) keeping the same routing with Route 83 and 86. All existing services would still be covered but passengers will have to transfer at College Park station to continue their trips.

During WMATA's FY2016 budget, it was proposed for route 83 to be given Sunday service replacing route 81 and discontinuing Sunday service to Greenbelt station. Routes 83 and 86 would replace route 81 in College Park while route C2 would replace route 81 between Greenbelt station and the University of Maryland. The reason for the changes was for WMATA to make the College Park Line easier to understand for riders.

On March 27, 2016, all route 81 service was discontinued and replaced by route 83. Route 83 also added Sunday service replacing the 81 but no longer serving Greenbelt station where it was replaced by route C2. Route C2 also added Sunday service to replace Route 81 portion between Greenbelt Road and Greenbelt station.

On December 18, 2016, all route 82 was discontinued and was replaced by the 83. Short trips between Rhode Island Avenue station and Mount Rainier were renamed into the 83. Also, due to Metro closing at midnight during that period because of SafeTrack maintenance, select Route 83 trips were introduced to operate between Rhode Island Avenue–Brentwood and College Park–U of MD station on Friday and Saturday late nights only.

On March 19, 2017, route 83 short trips between Rhode Island Avenue station and Mount Rainier during weekday peak hours were discontinued and replaced by route G9.

Beginning on September 1, 2019, the College Park Metrobus loop was temporarily closed for construction of the Purple line at College Park station. As a result, routes 83 and 86 were temporarily rerouted to stops along River Road, and later to the west side of the station via Calvert Road in April 2020.

During the COVID-19 pandemic, routes 83 and 86 were relegated to operate on its Saturday schedule beginning on March 16, 2020. However beginning on March 18, 2020, the route was further reduced to operate on its Sunday schedule. Also beginning on March 21, 2020, weekend service was further reduced with the 83 operating every 30 minutes and route 86 having all weekend service suspended. On August 23, 2020, additional service was added to routes 83 and 86 operating every 60 minutes with a 30-minute frequency along Baltimore Avenue. However, Route 86 Sunday service remained suspended while Route 83 operated every 30 to 35 minutes in its place.

In May 2020, WMATA announced that route 83X would not operate during the 2020 summer season due to the ongoing COVID-19 pandemic and Metro's reduced service since March 16, 2020. Alternative service would be provided by routes 83 and 86. The 83X suspended was lasted into 2021, and was never returned to service by the September 5, 2021 changes.

On September 26, 2020, WMATA proposed to reduce the frequency of buses to every 60 minutes on both routes 83 and 86 and eliminate all route 86 Sunday service due to low federal funding. Later in February 2021 during WMATA's FY2022 Budget crisis, WMATA proposed to reroute the 83 from Cherry Hill Campground to Greenbelt station to replace Route C2 and eliminate all 86 service beginning in January 2022. Subsequently on April 22, 2021, WMATA approved the FY2022 budget and received federal funding to avoid service cuts.

On June 10, 2021, WMATA proposed to restore the line's pre-pandemic schedule and restore Route 86 Sunday service as part of WMATA's Pandemic Recovery Plan.

On September 5, 2021, route 86 Sunday service was restored, and the line's pre-pandemic schedule was also restored.

Due to rising cases of the COVID-19 Omicron variant, the line was reduced to its Saturday service on weekdays beginning on January 10, 2022. Full weekday service resumed on February 7, 2022.

On June 12, 2022, service to the east side of College Park station resumed with buses serving Bus Bay A.

In 2024 during WMATA's FY2024 Budget crisis, WMATA proposed to eliminate all weekend 83 and 86 service. However on April 25, 2024, Metro’s Board of Directors approved a $4.8 billion capital and operating budget which avoided service cuts.

=== Better Bus Redesign ===
In 2022, WMATA launched its Better Bus Redesign project, which aimed to redesign the entire Metrobus Network and is the first full redesign of the agency's bus network in its history.

In April 2023, WMATA launched its Draft Visionary Network. As part of the drafts, WMATA proposed to have Routes 83 and 86 terminate at both Greenbelt station and College Park–University of Maryland station, respectively, which are named Routes MD249 and MD250 in the draft. Route 83 service between College Park and Cherry Hill was renamed to Route M349 and was extended to Goddard Corporate Park via Paint Branch Parkway and Good Luck Road. Route 86 service between Hyattsville Crossing and Calverton was also renamed to Route M248, which was extended to White Oak Shopping Center and skipped College Park station in the process. Route 86 service between 38th Street and Hyattsville Crossing was replaced by Routes DC114 and MD344.

During WMATA's Revised Draft Visionary Network, WMATA renamed the MD249 and MD250 into Routes P1X (MD249) and P10 (MD250). Route P1X kept its routing from the Draft Visionary Network, operating between Rhode Island Avenue station and Greenbelt station, but Route P10 was rerouted inside Hyattsville to serve Jefferson Street, 42nd Avenue, Queensbury Road, Hyattsville Crossing station, and East-West Highway before resuming its routing along Baltimore Avenue, following a similar routing to Route 86. Route MD248 was also renamed to Route P11 and kept the 86 routing between Hyattsville Crossing and Calverton, but was also extended to Greencastle Park & Ride via Cherry Hill Road, Old Columbia Pike, Briggs Chaney Road, and Briggs Chaney Park & Ride. All changes were then proposed during WMATA's 2025 Proposed Network. The MD349 was also retained by WMATA as Route P46, but was cutback to College Park station and was rerouted to New Carrollton station from Doctors Community Hospital and was ultimately dropped from the 2025 Proposed Network.

Throughout the proposals, Route P1X was rerouted from Greenbelt station to IKEA Way in College Park, with service between Greenbelt station and Greenbelt Road & Baltimore Avenue operated by Route P32 between Greenbelt and Fort Totten station. Route P11 was also removed from the proposals in favor of Route M44, which operated between North Bethesda station and Hyattsville Crossing station via the former C8 routing between North Bethesda and White Oak, and the proposed P11 routing between White Oak and Hyattsville Crossing.

On November 21, 2024, WMATA approved its Better Bus Redesign Network, with service on the College Park Line being simplified.

Beginning on June 29, 2025, Route 83 was renamed to Route P1X and was rerouted to serve IKEA Way in College Park, discontinuing service to both College Park station and Cherry Hill. Service was also rerouted to remain along Baltimore Avenue, discontinuing service along Greenbelt Road, Rhode Island Avenue, Edgewood Road, and Cherry Hill Road. Service between College Park station and Cherry Hill was replaced by Route M42, which operates along the former 83 routing between College Park and Cherry Hill, and extended to North Bethesda station via the former C8 routing. Route 86 was renamed to Route P10 and was rerouted along Jefferson Street and 42nd Avenue in Hyattsville, eliminating service on 38th Street, Hamilton Street, 40th Avenue, and Oglethorpe Street. The route was also cutback to terminate at College Park–University of Maryland station, with service between College Park station and Calverton replaced by Route M44 which operates between Hyattsville Crossing and North Bethesda stations, following the former 86 routing between Hyattsville Crossing and Calverton, skipping College Park station in the process. Service along 38th Street was replaced by Route C41, while service along both Hamilton Street and 40th Avenue had no replacement service.

Beginning on June 21, 2026, Route P1X would serve all local stops along Baltimore Avenue between University Boulevard and East West Highway.
