= Randolph Road Line =

M42, M44
- Randolph Road–College Park Line; Randolph Road–Hyattsville Crossing Line

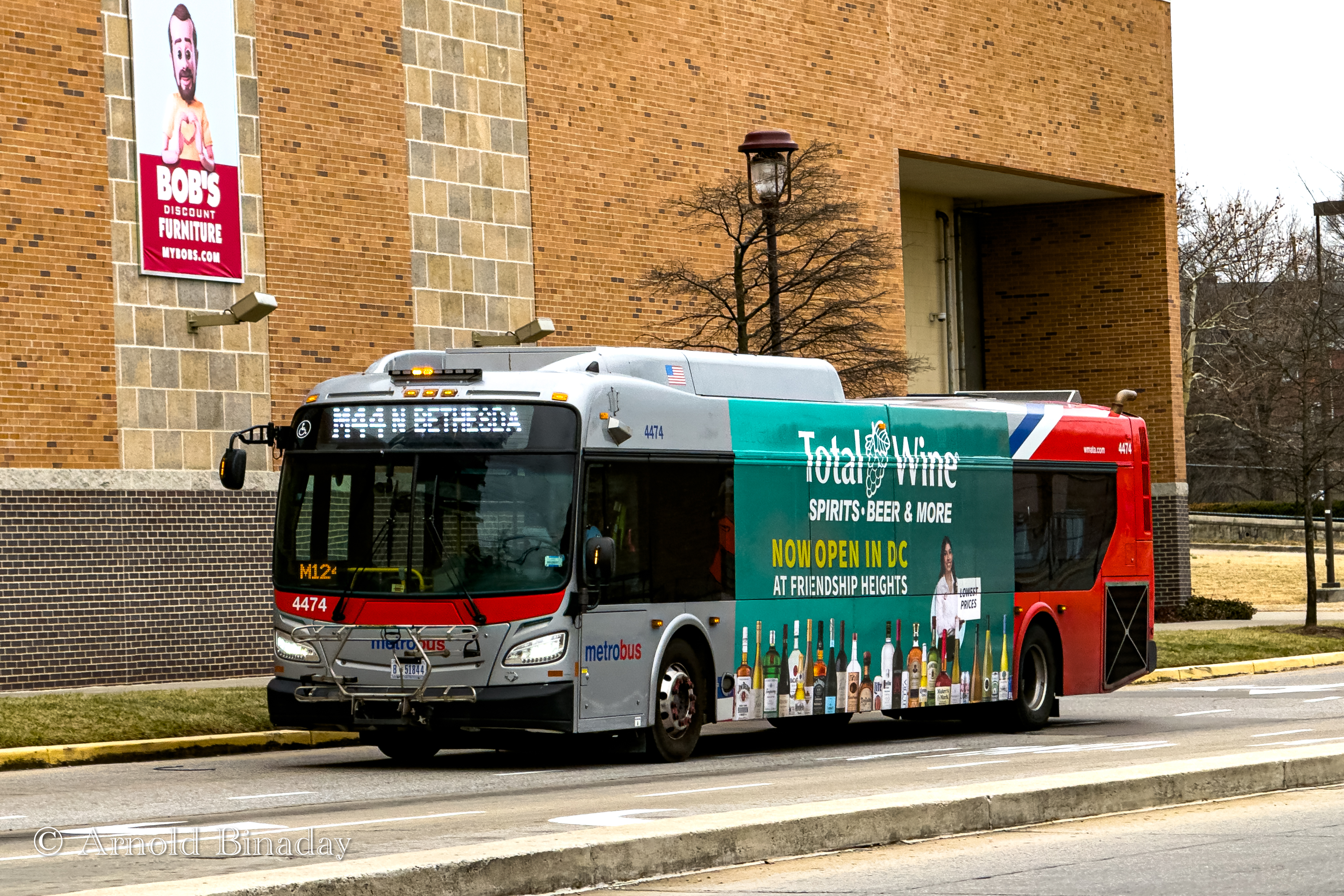
- Route M44 at Hyattsville Crossing station in January 2026

Overview
- System: Metrobus
- Operator: Washington Metropolitan Area Transit Authority
- Garage: Montgomery
- Livery: Local
- Status: In Service
- Began service: C8: July 25, 1998; M42, M44: June 29, 2025
- Ended service: C8: June 28, 2025
- Predecessors: Metrobus: C8; Ride On: 10

Route
- Locale: Prince George's County, Montgomery County
- Communities served: Hyattsville (M44), College Park, Beltsville (M44), Calverton, White Oak (M42), Colesville, Silver Spring, Glenmont, Rockville, North Bethesda
- Landmarks served: Wheaton High School, Glenmont station, John F. Kennedy High School, East County Education Center, White Oak Medical Center, High Point High School (M44), Cherry Hill Park (M42), Seven Springs Village Apartments (M42), University of Maryland, The Mall at Prince George's (M44)
- Start: M42: College Park station M44: Hyattsville Crossing station
- Via: Randolph Road, East Randolph Road (M44), New Hampshire Avenue (M42), Lockwood Drive (M42), Old Columbia Pike (M44), Broadbirch Drive, Plum Orchard Drive, Cherry Hill Road, Powder Mill Road (M44), Rhode Island Avenue, Baltimore Avenue, Campus Drive (M42), East-West Highway (M44)
- End: North Bethesda station
- Length: 90 minutes

Service
- Level: Daily
- Frequency: 30 minutes (weekdays); 60 minutes (weekends)
- Operates: 5:00 AM – 11:30 PM (Weekdays); 6:00 AM – 10:00 PM (Weekends)
- Ridership: 760,790 (FY 2025)
- Transfers: SmarTrip, Contactless Bank Cards
- Timetable: Randolph Road Line

The Randolph Road Line, designated as Randolph Road–College Park Line on Route M42, and Randolph Road–Hyattsville Crossing Line on Route M44, are daily bus routes operated by the Washington Metropolitan Area Transit Authority, between College Park station (M42) and Hyattsville Crossing station (M44) of the Green and Yellow Lines and North Bethesda station of the Red Line of the Washington Metro. Both routes operate every 30 minutes on weekdays and every 60 minutes on weekends. Trips take roughly 90 minutes to complete on both routes. Routes M42 and M44 replaced former route C8 designated as the College Park–North Bethesda Line as well as portions of former Metrobus routes 83, 86 and Z2 and Ride On route 10.

== Route ==
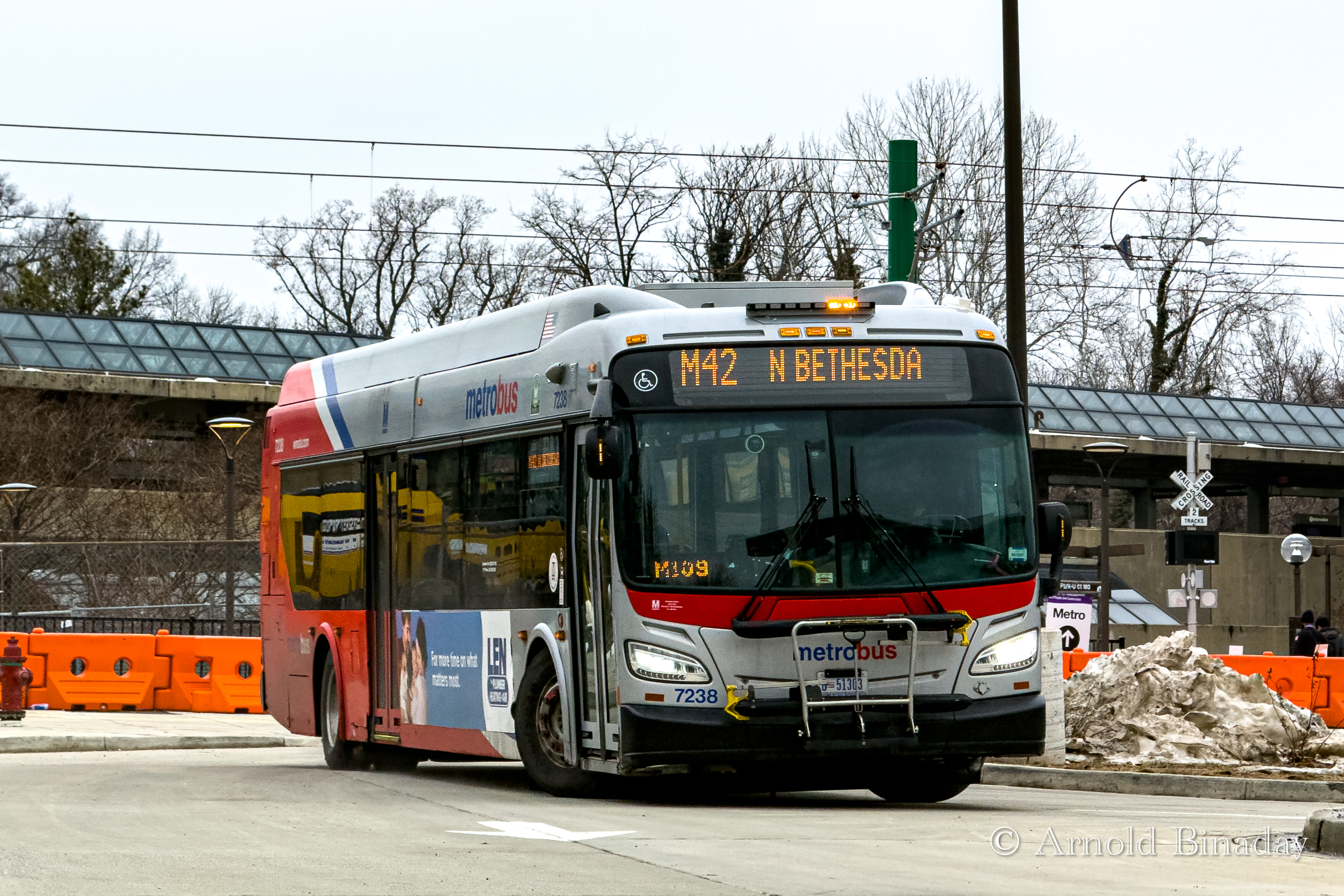
Route M42 at College Park station in February 2026

Route M42 operates between College Park and North Bethesda stations via New Hampshire Avenue, Lockwood Drive, Cherry Hill Road, Rhode Island Avenue, Greenbelt Road, Baltimore Avenue, and Campus Drive. Route M44 operates between Hyattsville Crossing and North Bethesda stations via East Randolph Road, Old Columbia Pike, Powder Mill Road, Rhode Island Avenue, Baltimore Avenue, and East-West Highway. Service on both routes overlap along Randolph Road, Broadbirch Drive, Plum Orchard Drive, Cherry Hill Road and Baltimore Avenue, and the segment between Glenmont and North Bethesda Stations. Both routes operate out of Montgomery division.

=== M42 stops ===
Bus stop	Direction	Connections
Montgomery County, Maryland
Marinelli Road / Rockville Pike North Bethesda station	Eastbound station, Westbound terminal	Metrobus: M44; Ride On: 5, 26, 38, 42, 46, 81, 101; Washington Metro:
Nicholson Lane / Rockville Pike	Eastbound	Metrobus: M44; Ride On: 38
Nicholson Lane / Huff Court	Bidirectional	Metrobus: M44; Ride On: 38
Nicholson Lane / White Flint Plaza	Bidirectional	Metrobus: M44; Ride On: 38
Nicholson Lane / Nicholson Court	Eastbound	Metrobus: M44; Ride On: 38
Nicholson Lane / Nebel Street	Westbound	Metrobus: M44; Ride On: 38
Parklawn Drive / Boiling Brook Parkway	Bidirectional	Metrobus: M44
Parklawn Drive / Parklawn Terrace	Bidirectional	Metrobus: M44
Randolph Road / Putnam Road	Eastbound	Metrobus: M12, M44
Randolph Road / Lauderdale Drive	Westbound	Metrobus: M12, M44
Randolph Road / Hunters Lane	Bidirectional	Metrobus: M12, M44
Randolph Road / Rockinghorse Road	Eastbound	Metrobus: M12, M44
Randolph Road / Gaynor Drive	Westbound	Metrobus: M12, M44
Randolph Road / Dewey Road	Bidirectional	Metrobus: M12, M44
Randolph Road / Charles Road	Bidirectional	Metrobus: M12, M44
Randolph Road / Bennion Road	Eastbound	Metrobus: M12, M44
Randolph Road / Selfridge Drive	Westbound	Metrobus: M12, M44
Randolph Road / Veirs Mill Road	Bidirectional	Metrobus: M12, M44; Ride On: 40, 48
Randolph Road / Colie Drive	Bidirectional	Metrobus: M44
Randolph Road / Bushey Drive	Bidirectional	Metrobus: M44
Randolph Road / Connecticut Avenue	Bidirectional	Metrobus: M44; Ride On: 41
Randolph Road / Good Hill Road	Bidirectional	Metrobus: M44
Randolph Road / Dalewood Drive	Bidirectional	Metrobus: M44
Randolph Road / Bluhill Road	Bidirectional	Metrobus: M44
Randolph Road / Lindell Street	Eastbound	Metrobus: M44
Randolph Road / Denley Road	Westbound	Metrobus: M44
Randolph Road / Terrapin Road	Bidirectional	Metrobus: M44
Randolph Road / Livingston Street	Bidirectional	Metrobus: M44
Randolph Road / Grandview Avenue	Eastbound	Metrobus: M44
Georgia Avenue / Randolph Road	Bidirectional	Metrobus: M20, M22, M44
Glenmont station Bus Bays E & F	Bidirectional	Metrobus: M20, M22, M44; Ride On: 26, 31, 33, 39, 41, 49, 51, 53; Washington Metro:
Georgia Avenue / Judson Road	Westbound	Metrobus: M20, M22, M44
Randolph Road / Georgia Avenue	Eastbound	Metrobus: M44
Randolph Road / Glenallan Avenue	Bidirectional	Metrobus: M44
Randolph Road / Heurich Road	Eastbound	Metrobus: M44
Randolph Road / English Orchard Court	Westbound	Metrobus: M44
Randolph Road / Tivoli Lake Boulevard	Bidirectional	Metrobus: M44
Randolph Road / Kemp Mill Road	Bidirectional	Metrobus: M44
Randolph Road / Springtree Drive	Eastbound	Metrobus: M44
Randolph Road / Hawkesbury Lane	Westbound	Metrobus: M44
Randolph Road / #500	Eastbound	Metrobus: M44
Randolph Road / #531	Westbound	Metrobus: M44
Randolph Road / Hamilton Road	Bidirectional	Metrobus: M44
Randolph Road / Hamilton Place	Bidirectional	Metrobus: M44
Randolph Road / Kimblewick Drive	Bidirectional	Metrobus: M44
Randolph Road / Locksley Lane	Bidirectional	Metrobus: M44
Randolph Road / Sherwood Forest Drive	Bidirectional	Metrobus: M44
Randolph Road / Vital Way	Eastbound	Metrobus: M44
Randolph Road / New Hampshire Avenue	Westbound	Metrobus: M44
New Hampshire Avenue / Randolph Road	Eastbound	
New Hampshire Avenue / Wolf Drive	Bidirectional	
New Hampshire Avenue / Bergman Road	Bidirectional	Ride On: 21
New Hampshire Avenue / Shaw Avenue	Bidirectional	Ride On: 21
New Hampshire Avenue / Thomas Drive	Bidirectional	Ride On: 21
New Hampshire Avenue / Norcross Way	Eastbound	Ride On: 21
New Hampshire Avenue / Hollywood Avenue	Westbound	Ride On: 21
New Hampshire Avenue / Blick Drive	Eastbound	Ride On: 21
New Hampshire Avenue / Venice Drive	Westbound	Ride On: 21
New Hampshire Avenue / Valley Brook Drive	Bidirectional	Ride On: 21
New Hampshire Avenue / Jackson Road	Bidirectional	Ride On: 21
New Hampshire Avenue / Tanley Road	Bidirectional	Ride On: 21
New Hampshire Avenue / Nora Drive	Bidirectional	Ride On: 21
New Hampshire Avenue / Quaint Acres Drive	Eastbound	Ride On: 21
New Hampshire Avenue / Tracy Drive	Westbound	Ride On: 21
New Hampshire Avenue / Lockwood Drive	Westbound	Metrobus: M60, M52, M54; Ride On: 22, Flash BRT (Orange)
Lockwood Drive / New Hampshire Avenue	Bidirectional	Metrobus: M52, M54, M60; Ride On: 22, Flash BRT (Orange)
Lockwood Drive / White Oak Transit Center	Bidirectional	Metrobus: M52, M54, M60
Lockwood Drive / White Oak Park Apartments	Bidirectional	Metrobus: M52, M54, M60
Lockwood Drive / December Drive	Bidirectional	Metrobus: M52, M54, M60
Stewart Lane / April Lane	Bidirectional	Metrobus: M52, M54, M60
Stewart Lane / White Oak Apartments	Bidirectional	Metrobus: M52, M54, M60
Stewart Lane / Old Columbia Pike	Bidirectional	Metrobus: M52, M54, M60
Tech Road / Prosperity Drive	Bidirectional	Metrobus: M44, M60; Ride On: 27, Flash BRT (Orange)
Broadbirch Drive / Tech Road	Eastbound	Metrobus: M44, M60
Broadbirch Drive / #2200 Hilton Garden Inn	Westbound	Metrobus: M44, M60
Broadbirch Drive / Bournefield Way	Bidirectional	Metrobus: M44, M52, M60; Ride On: 27
Broadbirch Drive / Plum Orchard Drive	Eastbound	Metrobus: M44, M52, M60, P16; Ride On: 27
Plum Orchard Drive / Broadbirch Drive	Westbound	Metrobus: M44, M52, M60, P16; Ride On: 27
Plum Orchard Drive / Adventist White Oak Medical Center	Bidirectional	Metrobus: M44, M60, P16; Ride On: 27
Plum Orchard Drive / US Post Office Annex	Westbound	Metrobus: M44, M60, P16; Ride On: 27
Plum Orchard Drive / ReStore	Eastbound	Metrobus: M44, M60, P16; Ride On: 27
Plum Orchard Drive / Cherry Hill Road	Bidirectional	Metrobus: M44, M60, P16; Ride On: 27
Prince George's County, Maryland
Cherry Hill Road / Townley Apartments	Bidirectional	Metrobus: M44; Ride On: 27
Cherry Hill Road / Cherry Hill Court	Bidirectional	Metrobus: M44; Ride On: 27
Cherry Hill Road / Powder Mill Road	Bidirectional	Metrobus: M44; Ride On: 27
Cherry Hill Road / Collier Road	Bidirectional	
Cherry Hill Road / Ashfield Road	Bidirectional	
Cherry Hill Road / Sellman Road	Bidirectional	
Jayrose Boulevard / Cherry Hill Road Cherry Hill Park	Bidirectional	
Seven Springs Village / #9348	Bidirectional	
Seven Springs Village / #9316	Bidirectional	
Seven Springs Village / #9308	Bidirectional	
Cherry Hill Road / 47th Avenue	Bidirectional	
Cherry Hill Road / College Park Marketplace	Bidirectional	
Edgewood Road / 49th Avenue	Bidirectional	
Edgewood Road / Rhode Island Avenue	Bidirectional	
Rhode Island Avenue / Muskogee Street	Bidirectional	
Rhode Island Avenue / Hollywood Road	Bidirectional	
Rhode Island Avenue / Kenesaw Street	Bidirectional	
Rhode Island Avenue / Fox Street	Bidirectional	
Rhode Island Avenue / Cherokee Street	Bidirectional	
Rhode Island Avenue / Apache Street	Westbound	
Rhode Island Avenue / University Boulevard	Bidirectional	
Greenbelt Road / Rhode Island Avenue	Eastbound	Metrobus: P32
Greenbelt Road / 48th Avenue	Bidirectional	Metrobus: P32
Baltimore Avenue / Metzerott Road	Eastbound	Metrobus: M44, P1X, P32
Baltimore Avenue / Berwyn Road	Bidirectional	Metrobus: M44, P1X, P32
Baltimore Avenue / Quebec Street	Bidirectional	Metrobus: M44, P1X, P32
Baltimore Avenue / Navahoe Street	Eastbound	Metrobus: M44, P1X, P32
Baltimore Avenue / Berwyn House Road	Westbound	Metrobus: M44, P1X, P32
Baltimore Avenue / Lakeland Road	Westbound	Metrobus: M44, P1X, P32
Campus Drive / Baltimore Avenue	Eastbound	Metrobus: P10, P1X, P31; TheBus: P37; Shuttle-UM
Campus Drive / Paint Branch Trail	Bidirectional	Metrobus: P10, P31; TheBus: P37; Shuttle-UM
College Park station Bus Bay B	Westbound station, Eastbound terminal	Metrobus: P10, P14, P31; TheBus: P37; Shuttle-UM: 104; MTA Maryland: 204; Washington Metro: MARC: Camden Line; MTA: Purple Line (Planned)

=== M44 stops ===
Bus stop	Direction	Connections
Montgomery County, Maryland
Marinelli Road / Rockville Pike North Bethesda station	Eastbound station, Westbound terminal	Metrobus: M42; Ride On: 5, 26, 38, 42, 46, 81, 101; Washington Metro:
Nicholson Lane / Rockville Pike	Eastbound	Metrobus: M42; Ride On: 38
Nicholson Lane / Huff Court	Bidirectional	Metrobus: M42; Ride On: 38
Nicholson Lane / White Flint Plaza	Bidirectional	Metrobus: M42; Ride On: 38
Nicholson Lane / Nicholson Court	Eastbound	Metrobus: M42; Ride On: 38
Nicholson Lane / Nebel Street	Westbound	Metrobus: M42; Ride On: 38
Parklawn Drive / Boiling Brook Parkway	Bidirectional	Metrobus: M42
Parklawn Drive / Parklawn Terrace	Bidirectional	Metrobus: M42
Randolph Road / Putnam Road	Eastbound	Metrobus: M12, M42
Randolph Road / Lauderdale Drive	Westbound	Metrobus: M12, M42
Randolph Road / Hunters Lane	Bidirectional	Metrobus: M12, M42
Randolph Road / Rockinghorse Road	Eastbound	Metrobus: M12, M42
Randolph Road / Gaynor Drive	Westbound	Metrobus: M12, M42
Randolph Road / Dewey Road	Bidirectional	Metrobus: M12, M42
Randolph Road / Charles Road	Bidirectional	Metrobus: M12, M42
Randolph Road / Bennion Road	Eastbound	Metrobus: M12, M42
Randolph Road / Selfridge Drive	Westbound	Metrobus: M12, M42
Randolph Road / Veirs Mill Road	Bidirectional	Metrobus: M12, M42; Ride On: 40, 48
Randolph Road / Colie Drive	Bidirectional	Metrobus: M42
Randolph Road / Bushey Drive	Bidirectional	Metrobus: M42
Randolph Road / Connecticut Avenue	Bidirectional	Metrobus: M42; Ride On: 41
Randolph Road / Good Hill Road	Bidirectional	Metrobus: M42
Randolph Road / Dalewood Drive	Bidirectional	Metrobus: M42
Randolph Road / Bluhill Road	Bidirectional	Metrobus: M42
Randolph Road / Lindell Street	Eastbound	Metrobus: M42
Randolph Road / Denley Road	Westbound	Metrobus: M42
Randolph Road / Terrapin Road	Bidirectional	Metrobus: M42
Randolph Road / Livingston Street	Bidirectional	Metrobus: M42
Randolph Road / Grandview Avenue	Eastbound	Metrobus: M42
Georgia Avenue / Randolph Road	Bidirectional	Metrobus: M20, M22, M42
Glenmont station Bus Bays E & F	Bidirectional	Metrobus: M20, M22, M42; Ride On: 26, 31, 33, 39, 41, 49, 51, 53; Washington Metro:
Georgia Avenue / Judson Road	Westbound	Metrobus: M20, M22, M42
Randolph Road / Georgia Avenue	Eastbound	Metrobus: M42
Randolph Road / Glenallan Avenue	Bidirectional	Metrobus: M42
Randolph Road / Heurich Road	Eastbound	Metrobus: M42
Randolph Road / English Orchard Court	Westbound	Metrobus: M42
Randolph Road / Tivoli Lake Boulevard	Bidirectional	Metrobus: M42
Randolph Road / Kemp Mill Road	Bidirectional	Metrobus: M42
Randolph Road / Springtree Drive	Eastbound	Metrobus: M42
Randolph Road / Hawkesbury Lane	Westbound	Metrobus: M42
Randolph Road / #500	Eastbound	Metrobus: M42
Randolph Road / #531	Westbound	Metrobus: M42
Randolph Road / Hamilton Road	Bidirectional	Metrobus: M42
Randolph Road / Hamilton Place	Bidirectional	Metrobus: M42
Randolph Road / Kimblewick Drive	Bidirectional	Metrobus: M42
Randolph Road / Locksley Lane	Bidirectional	Metrobus: M42
Randolph Road / Sherwood Forest Drive	Bidirectional	Metrobus: M42
Randolph Road / Vital Way	Eastbound	Metrobus: M42
Randolph Road / New Hampshire Avenue	Westbound	Metrobus: M42
East Randolph Road / New Hampshire Avenue	Bidirectional	
East Randolph Road / Clifton Road	Westbound	
East Randolph Road / #601 Willow Manor	Eastbound	
East Randolph Road / Fairland Road	Westbound	
East Randolph Road / Octagon Lane	Eastbound	
East Randolph Road / Bea Kay Drive	Westbound	
East Randolph Road / Burkhart Street	Eastbound	
East Randolph Road / Partridge Drive	Bidirectional	
East Randolph Road / Broadmore Road	Eastbound	
East Randolph Road / Appleby Drive	Westbound	
East Randolph Road / Smith Village Road	Bidirectional	
East Randolph Road / Tamarack Road	Bidirectional	Ride On: 21
East Randolph Road / Billington Road	Bidirectional	
East Randolph Road / Valley Mill Park	Bidirectional	
East Randolph Road / Tourmaline Court	Bidirectional	
East Randolph Road / Serpentine Way	Bidirectional	
East Randolph Road / Old Columbia Pike	Bidirectional	Metrobus: M54
Old Columbia Pike / East Randolph Road	Bidirectional	Metrobus: M54
Old Columbia Pike / Carters Grove Drive	Eastbound	Metrobus: M54; Ride On: 27
Tech Road / Columbia Pike	Bidirectional	Metrobus: M42, M60; Ride On: 27, Flash BRT (Orange)
Tech Road / Prosperity Drive	Bidirectional	Metrobus: M42, M60; Ride On: 27, Flash BRT (Orange)
Broadbirch Drive / Tech Road	Eastbound	Metrobus: M42, M60
Broadbirch Drive / #2200 Hilton Garden Inn	Westbound	Metrobus: M42, M60
Broadbirch Drive / Bournefield Way	Bidirectional	Metrobus: M42, M52, M60; Ride On: 27
Broadbirch Drive / Plum Orchard Drive	Eastbound	Metrobus: M42, M52, M60, P16; Ride On: 27
Plum Orchard Drive / Broadbirch Drive	Westbound	Metrobus: M42, M52, M60, P16; Ride On: 27
Plum Orchard Drive / Adventist White Oak Medical Center	Bidirectional	Metrobus: M42, M60, P16; Ride On: 27
Plum Orchard Drive / US Post Office Annex	Westbound	Metrobus: M42, M60, P16; Ride On: 27
Plum Orchard Drive / ReStore	Eastbound	Metrobus: M44, M60, P16; Ride On: 27
Plum Orchard Drive / Cherry Hill Road	Bidirectional	Metrobus: M42, M60, P16; Ride On: 27
Prince George's County, Maryland
Cherry Hill Road / Townley Apartments	Bidirectional	Metrobus: M42; Ride On: 27
Cherry Hill Road / Cherry Hill Court	Bidirectional	Metrobus: M42; Ride On: 27
Cherry Hill Road / Powder Mill Road	Westbound	Metrobus: M42, P16; Ride On: 27
Powder Mill Road / Cherry Hill Road	Eastbound	Metrobus: M42, P16; Ride On: 27
Powder Mill Road / High Point High School	Bidirectional	Metrobus: P16
Powder Mill Road / Allview Drive	Westbound	Metrobus: P16
Powder Mill Road / Evans Trail	Eastbound	Metrobus: P16
Powder Mill Road / Beltsville Drive	Bidirectional	
Powder Mill Road / 34th Place	Bidirectional	
Powder Mill Road / Caverly Avenue	Bidirectional	
Powder Mill Road / Roby Avenue	Westbound	
Powder Mill Road / Emack Road	Eastbound	
Powder Mill Road / Cedar Lane	Bidirectional	
Powder Mill Road / Odell Road	Bidirectional	
Powder Mill Road / Howard Avenue	Bidirectional	
Powder Mill Road / Rhode Island Avenue	Bidirectional	
Rhode Island Avenue / Sellman Road	Bidirectional	
Rhode Island Avenue / Twin Chimneys Office Park	Bidirectional	
Rhode Island Avenue / Baltimore Avenue	Bidirectional	Metrobus: P12; RTA: 302; TheBus: P19
Baltimore Avenue / Montgomery Road	Bidirectional	Metrobus: P12; RTA: 302; TheBus: P19
Baltimore Avenue / Sunnyside Avenue	Bidirectional	Metrobus: P12; RTA: 302; TheBus: P19
Baltimore Avenue / South Drive	Bidirectional	
Baltimore Avenue / IKEA Center Boulevard	Bidirectional	Metrobus: P1X
Baltimore Avenue / Cherry Hill Road	Bidirectional	Metrobus: M42, P1X
Baltimore Avenue / Hollywood Road	Bidirectional	Metrobus: P1X
Baltimore Avenue / Indian Lane	Bidirectional	Metrobus: P1X
Baltimore Avenue / Erie Street	Bidirectional	Metrobus: P1X
Baltimore Avenue / Cherokee Street	Bidirectional	Metrobus: P1X
Baltimore Avenue / University Boulevard	Westbound	Metrobus: P1X
Baltimore Avenue / Metzerott Road	Eastbound	Metrobus: M42, P1X, P32
Baltimore Avenue / Berwyn Road	Bidirectional	Metrobus: M42, P1X, P32
Baltimore Avenue / Quebec Street	Bidirectional	Metrobus: M42, P1X, P32
Baltimore Avenue / Navahoe Street	Eastbound	Metrobus: M42, P1X, P32
Baltimore Avenue / Berwyn House Road	Westbound	Metrobus: M42, P1X, P32
Baltimore Avenue / Lakeland Road	Bidirectional	Metrobus: M42, P1X, P32
Baltimore Avenue / Campus Drive	Bidirectional	Metrobus: P10, P1X
Baltimore Avenue / Rossborough Lane	Bidirectional	Metrobus: P10, P1X; MTA: Purple Line (at Baltimore Avenue-College Park-UMD station) (Planned)
Baltimore Avenue / Regents Drive	Eastbound	Metrobus: P10, P1X
Baltimore Avenue / Knox Road	Westbound	Metrobus: P10, P1X
Baltimore Avenue / Hartwick Road	Bidirectional	Metrobus: P10, P1X
Baltimore Avenue / Guilford Road	Bidirectional	Metrobus: P10, P1X
Baltimore Avenue / Fordham Lane	Eastbound	Metrobus: P10, P1X
Baltimore Avenue / Amherst Road	Westbound	Metrobus: P10, P1X
Baltimore Avenue / Queens Chapel Road	Eastbound	Metrobus: P10, P1X
Baltimore Avenue / Van Buren Street	Bidirectional	Metrobus: P10, P1X
Baltimore Avenue / Underwood Street	Bidirectional	Metrobus: P10, P1X
Baltimore Avenue / Tuckerman Street	Eastbound	Metrobus: P10, P1X
Baltimore Avenue / Sheridan Street	Westbound	Metrobus: P10, P1X
East-West Highway / 44th Avenue	Westbound	Metrobus: P10
East-West Highway / 43rd Street	Eastbound	Metrobus: P10
East-West Highway / 42nd Avenue	Bidirectional	Metrobus: P10
East-West Highway / Adelphi Road	Eastbound	Metrobus: P10
East-West Highway / Queens Chapel Road	Westbound	Metrobus: P10
East-West Highway / Belcrest Road	Westbound	Metrobus: M12, P10, P32, P33; Shuttle-UM: 113
Belcrest Road / East-West Highway	Eastbound	Metrobus: M12, P10, P32, P33; Shuttle-UM: 113
Hyattsville Crossing station Bus Bay B	Westbound station, Eastbound terminal	Metrobus: M12, P10, P30, P32, P33, P35; TheBus: P43; Shuttle-UM: 113; Washington Metro:

== History ==
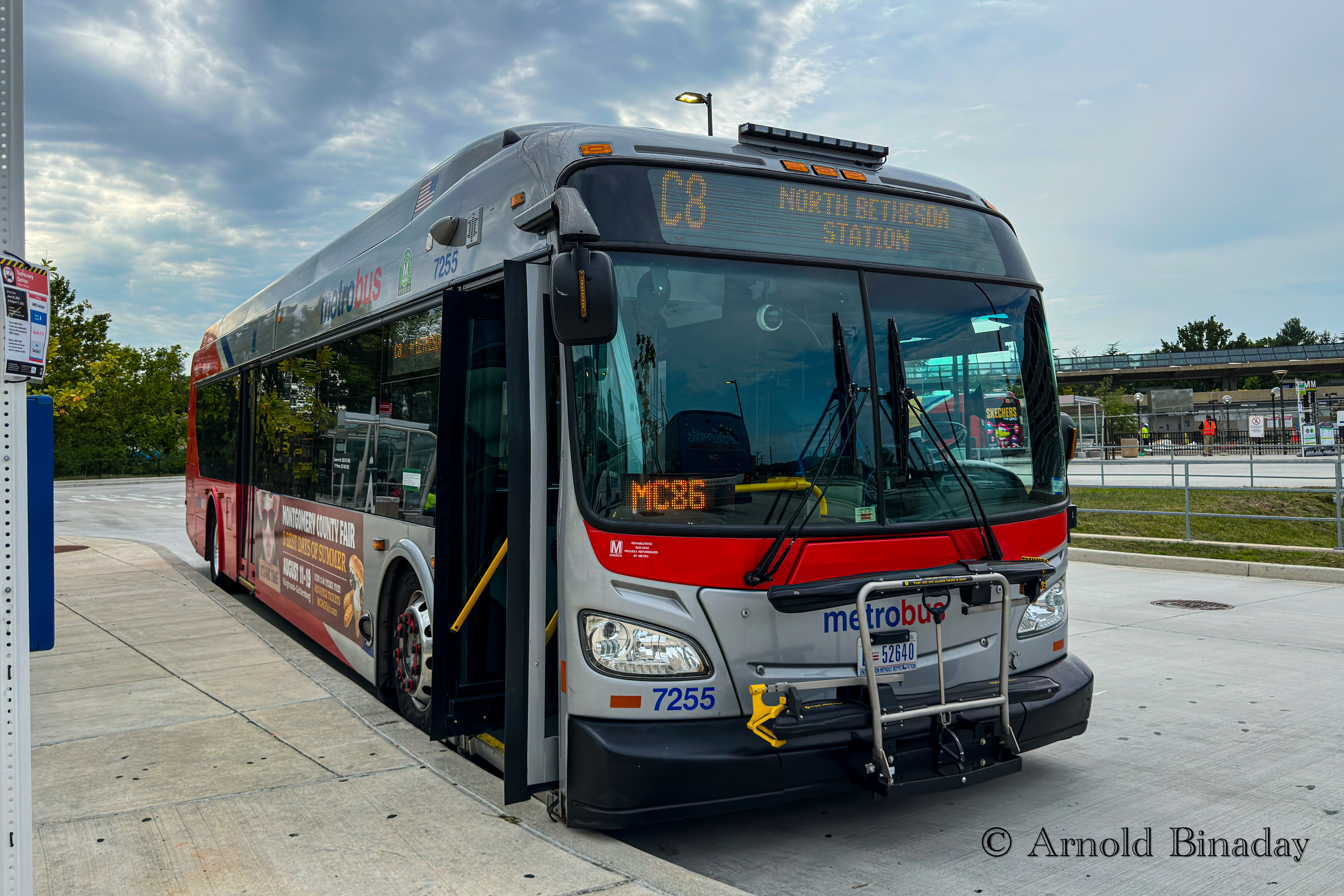
Former Route C8 at College Park station in August 2023

Route C8 was known for two different lines, prior to its current line being named under the Aspen Hill Road-Montgomery Mall Line and Glenmont-College Park Line.

=== Aspen Hill Road–Montgomery Mall Line ===
C8 originally operated as part of the former Aspen Hill Road–Montgomery Mall Line between Aspen Hill, Maryland and Montgomery Mall from February 19, 1978, until 1996. Until January 27, 1985, the route operated from Layhill to Congressional Plaza in Rockville. Starting in the early 1990s, some Saturday trips would terminate at the National Capital Trolley Museum. Beginning on June 28, 1992, weekday off-peak and Saturday service would be operated by Montgomery County's Ride On bus system. The route was discontinued in 1996, and was replaced by Ride On bus route 26.

=== Glenmont–College Park Line ===
Route C8 was then reincarnated on July 25, 1998, to operate as part of WMATA's new Glenmont–College Park Line. The line was created at the request of the Action Committee for Transit in February 1998, which sought to enhance transportation between University of Maryland, College Park and Washington Metro stations that are located in the upper northwestern region of Montgomery County, Maryland. The Action Committee for Transit had a very strong ambition for the C8 to operate between College Park–University of Maryland station and White Flint station, via Glenmont station between Monday and Saturday.

WMATA initially began operating the C8 between College Park and Glenmont station during the weekday peak hours as an experimental route as WMATA was not sure if the C8 would be successful in attracting enough riders to be able to sustain the route. The route mostly operated along River Road, Paint Branch Parkway, Campus Drive, Adelphi Road, New Hampshire Avenue, Randolph Road, and Georgia Avenue. If the route succeeded, the line would become permanent and can be extended to White Flint station.

=== Changes ===
On July 18, 1999, as a result of the success of the route in attracting a high volume of riders, WMATA made the C8 a permanent Metrobus route. WMATA also implemented weekday midday and Saturday service, as opposed to operating only during rush hours to meet the Action Committee for Transit's request for the C8 to operate more frequently throughout the day and Saturdays.

On January 13, 2001, WMATA finally met the full request of the Action Committee for Transit, of extending the C8 route beyond Glenmont station to White Flint station (now North Bethesda station) along Randolph Road replacing Ride On route 40. As a result, the name of the route was changed to the College Park-White Flint Line.

During WMATA's 2011 Fiscal Year, route C8 was proposed to be rerouted to operate to Prince George's Plaza (now Hyattsville Crossing) station instead of College Park–University of Maryland station to replace route R3. It was also proposed to divert Food and Drug Administration and Federal Research Center in White Oak, Maryland and into Archives II in College Park, Maryland. But route C8 would revert to a weekday peak hour route only discontinuing all midday, weekday evening, and Saturday service. This would lead to a loss of ridership for the C8 since it will only have reduced weekday service instead of Monday through Saturday service.

On June 17, 2012, route C8 was rerouted to divert off the intersection of Adelphi Road and directly enter the National Archives at College Park, replacing route R3. Route C8 also diverted into the Food and Drug Administration and Federal Research Center. Route C8 would skip its diversion into both the National Archives Building and White Oak FDA/FRC building on Saturdays as both buildings were closed.

In 2016 as part of WMATA's FY2018 budget, it was proposed to eliminate the C8 segment between Glenmont station and White Flint station to reduce costs. Performance measures according to WMATA goes as follows:

Performance Measures	Route C8	WMATA Guideline	Pass/Fail
Weekday Daily Riders	2,632	>432	Pass
Cost Recovery	27.8%	>16.6%	Pass
Subsidy/Rider	$3.03	<$4.81	Pass
Riders per Rev Trip	38.6	>10.7	Pass
Riders per Rev Mile	2.2	>1.3	Pass

- Discontinued segment averages 591 eastbound weekday boardings (19.1 per trip) and 401 westbound weekday boardings (12.5 per trip) according to WMATA automatic passenger counter data, which, accounts for 44.4% of eastbound boardings and 26.6% of westbound boardings.
- Discontinued segment averages 354 eastbound Saturday boardings (9.1 per trip) and 248 westbound Saturday boardings (7.8 per trip) according to WMATA automatic passenger counter data, which, accounts for 46.2% of eastbound boardings and 29.7% of westbound boardings.

On July 29, 2017, Saturday service to National Archives at College Park was discontinued due to the National Archives was now closed on Saturdays. Route C8 would skip the diversion on Saturdays but still serve the diversion on weekdays.

Beginning on September 1, 2019, for nine months, the College Park Metrobus loop was temporarily closed for construction of the Purple line at College Park station having all stops located along River Road. As of result, route C8 was temporarily rerouted along River Road having to turn around on the roundabout along Haig Drive to return to its regular route going to White Flint.

During the COVID-19 pandemic, route C8 was reduced to operate on its Saturday schedule beginning on March 16, 2020. However beginning on March 18, 2020, all route C8 service was suspended once WMATA reduced its Metrobus services to Sunday schedule only. Route C8 resumed service on August 23, 2020 operating every hour instead of every 30 minutes.

Beginning on April 20, 2020, parts of Calvert Road were closed due to the ongoing construction of the Purple line, Route C8 was originally going to be temporarily rerouted along Baltimore Avenue and to turn on Calvert Road to serve the west side of College Park–University of Maryland station since vehicles cannot travel along parts of Calvert Road. However the reroute did not operate at first due to the 2019-20 COVID-19 outbreak and Metro's reduced service since March 16. When Route C8 resumed service on August 24, 2020, it ran the detour along Baltimore Avenue and Calvert Road. Service to the east side resumed on June 12, 2022 with buses serving Bus Bay B.

On September 26, 2020, WMATA proposed to reduce the frequency of buses to every 60 minutes due to low federal funding. On June 10, 2021, WMATA proposed to restore the line's pre-pandemic schedule as part of WMATA's Pandemic Recovery Plan.

On September 5, 2021, Route C8 restored its pre-pandemic service.

Due to rising cases of the COVID-19 Omicron variant, the line was reduced to its Saturday service on weekdays beginning on January 10, 2022. Full weekday service resumed on February 7, 2022.

On May 29, 2022, Route C8 was modified to operate along Old Georgetown Road, Citadel Avenue, and Marinelli Road, now terminating along Rockville Pike, adjacent to White Flint station.

On September 11, 2022, the line was changed to the College Park–North Bethesda Line due to White Flint station being renamed to North Bethesda station.

In 2024 during WMATA's FY2024 Budget crisis, WMATA proposed to eliminate all Saturday C8 service. However on April 25, 2024, Metro’s Board of Directors approved a $4.8 billion capital and operating budget which avoided service cuts.

=== Better Bus Redesign ===
In 2022, WMATA launched its Better Bus Redesign project, which aimed to redesign the entire Metrobus Network and is the first full redesign of the agency's bus network in its history.

In April 2023, WMATA launched its Draft Visionary Network. As part of the drafts, WMATA proposed to split the C8 into two routes. The portion between North Bethesda station and the intersection of Randolph Road & New Hampshire Avenue remained the same, but was extended to White Oak Medical Center via East Randolph Road. Additionally, the line was also extended from North Bethesda station to Westfield Montgomery Mall via Old Georgetown Road and Democracy Boulevard. The line was named Route MD241. The C8 portion between College Park station and the intersection of Randolph Road & New Hampshire Avenue via Paint Branch Parkway, Stadium Drive, University Boulevard, Adelphi Road, Archives II, New Hampshire Avenue, and FDA Headquarters was also rerouted to White Oak Medical Center via Old Columbia Pike, Tech Road, Broadbirch Drive, and Plum Orchard Drive and was named Route MD345.

During WMATA's Revised Draft Visionary Network, Route MD345 was retained in the proposals and was renamed to Route M56. WMATA also split the MD241 into two separate routes at Glenmont station and renamed them into Routes M42 and M44. The M42 would operate on the former C8 portion between North Bethesda station and Glenmont station. The M44 would operate on the C8 portion between Glenmont station and the intersection of Randolph Road & New Hampshire Avenue, then continued straight on East Randolph Road before serving Tech Road Park & Ride, then operate along Broadbirch Drive, then Cherry Hill Road before operating on the former Routes 83 routing between Cherry Hill Campground and College Park station via Seven Spring Village, Edgewood Road, Rhode Island Avenue, Greenbelt Road, Baltimore Avenue, and Campus Road. The line would operate its full routing Monday through Saturday, with Sunday service only operating between College Park and Cherry Hill Campground. Service between Westfield Montgomery Mall and North Bethesda station was not included in these changes. A new limited-stop express route named the M4X was also proposed to operate alongside the M42 and M44, operating between Westfield Montgomery Mall and White Oak Medical Center via Old Georgetown Road, North Bethesda, Randolph Road, and Glenmont, operating daily.

All changes were then proposed during WMATA's 2025 Proposed Network.

During WMATA's proposed 2025 changes, WMATA made further changes to the proposed Routes M42, M44, M4X, and M56. Route M4X was dropped from the proposals in favor of Ride On's Flash BRT proposed Randolph Road BRT line. Route M56 was also dropped from the proposals in favor of new Routes M42 and M44. Both the previously proposed routes M42 and M44 would be combined into one route and named Route M42 and operate on the same routing of the former C8 between North Bethesda station and Randolph Road & New Hampshire Avenue, but would then operate along New Hampshire Avenue, then turn onto Lockwood Drive and operate via Stewart Lane, Old Columbia Pike, Tech Road, before operating on the proposed M44 routing between Broadbirch Drive and College Park–University of Maryland station. The proposed route would operate its full route daily.

The new proposed M44 was to operate alongside the M42 and operate between North Bethesda station and the intersection of Randolph Road & New Hampshire Avenue, then would continue along the original proposed M42, remaining straight along Randolph Road and serving Tech Road Park & Ride, then operate along Broadbirch Drive and Cherry Hill Road. Then the route would turn onto Powder Mill Road and operate to Calverton, then operate on the former Route 86 portion between Calverton and Hyattsville Crossing station via Powder Mill Road, Rhode Island Avenue, Baltimore Avenue, and East-West Highway before serving Hyattsville Crossing station while skipping College Park–University of Maryland station. The proposed route would operate its full route Monday through Saturday with Sunday service only operating between White Oak Medical Center and Hyattsville Crossing station.

On November 21, 2024, WMATA approved its Better Bus Redesign Network.

Beginning on June 29, 2025, Route C8 was modified and partially combined with Routes 83 and 86 and renamed into Routes M42 and M44. Both routes would operate along the same routing that the former C8 did between North Bethesda station and New Hampshire Avenue, but both would deviate from each other in White Oak.

Route M42 would remain along New Hampshire Avenue, then operate via Lockwood Drive and Columbia Pike, then turn on Broadbirch Drive, then Cherry Hill Road. The line would continue down and operate along the former Route 83 routing between Cherry Hill Park and College Park–University of Maryland station.

Route M44 would continue along Randolph Road and meet the M42 on Broadbirch Drive before serving White Oak Medical Center. Then the M44 operates along Cherry Hill Road before turning onto Powder Mill Road, and operating along the former Route 86 routing between Calverton and Hyattsville Crossing station, skipping College Park station in the process. Service would operate its full route daily instead of short turning in White Oak on Sundays.

All service between the Food and Drug Administration in White Oak, Maryland and Adelphi, Maryland was replaced by Route M60, while service between College Park station and Adelphi via University of Maryland and Archives II was replaced by TheBus Route P37.

On December 14, 2025, all M42 and M44 trips were rerouted to operate along Plum Orchard Drive between Broadbirch Drive and Cherry Hill Road.
