= Hyattsville Crossing station =

Washington Metro station

Hyattsville Crossing
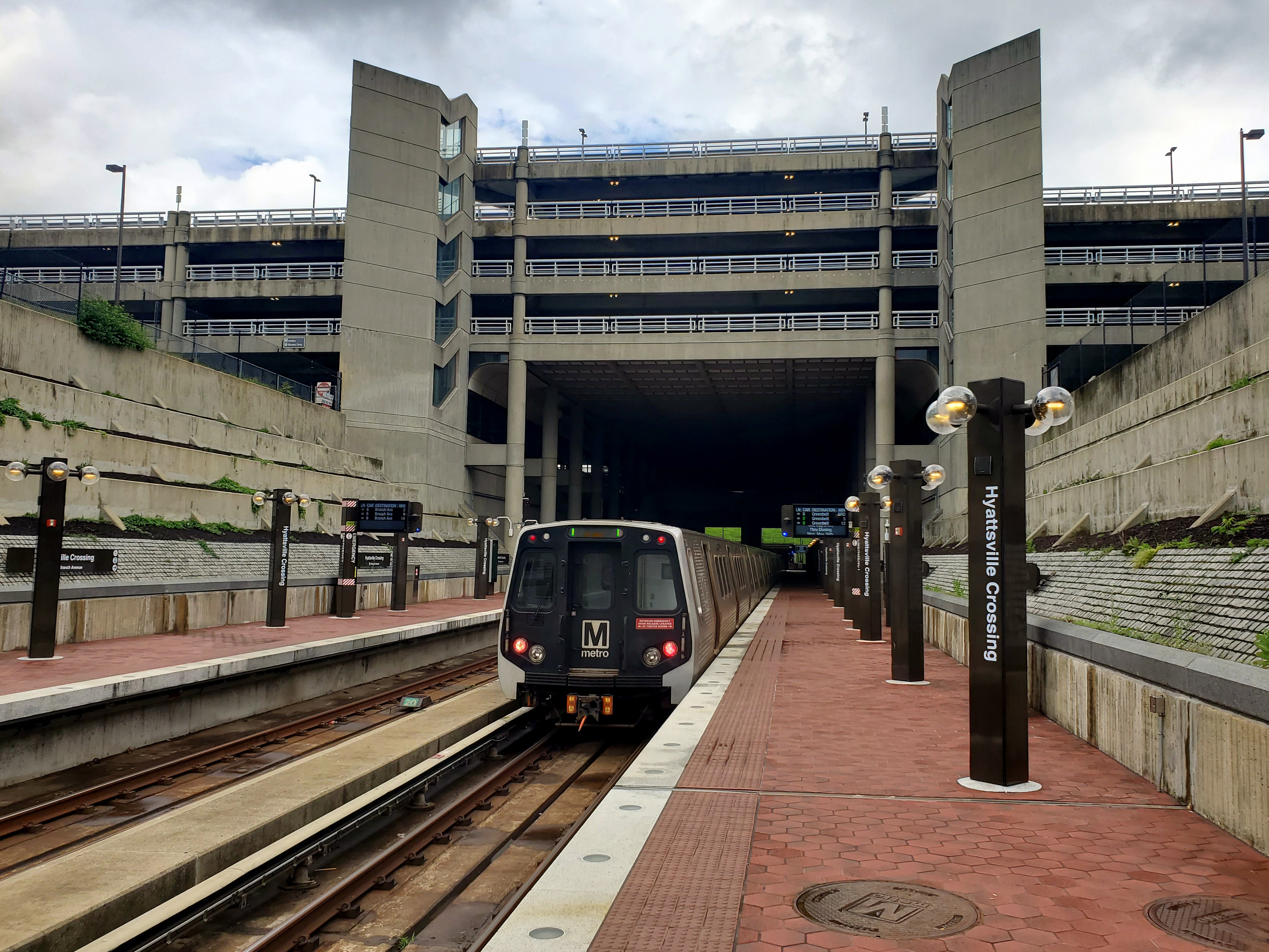
- A northbound Green Line train at the station in May 2025

General information
- Location: 3575 East–West Highway; Hyattsville, Maryland
- Coordinates: 38.965248°N 76.955988°W
- Owner: Washington Metropolitan Area Transit Authority
- Platforms: 2 side platforms
- Tracks: 2
- Connections: Metrobus: M12, M44, P10, P30, P32, P33, P35; GoPGC: P43; Shuttle-UM: 113

Construction
- Structure type: Below-grade
- Parking: 1,068 spaces
- Cycle facilities: Capital Bikeshare, 40 racks and 24 lockers
- Accessible: Yes

Other information
- Station code: E08

History
- Opened: December 11, 1993
- Rebuilt: 2021
- Former names: Prince George's Plaza (1993–2022)

Passengers
- 2025: 3,634 (average weekday)
- Rank: 50 of 98

Services
Preceding station	Washington Metro	Following station
West Hyattsville toward Huntington	Yellow Line	College Park toward Greenbelt
West Hyattsville toward Branch Avenue	Green Line	College Park toward Greenbelt
Former services
Preceding station	Washington Metro	Following station
West Hyattsville toward Farragut North	Green Line Commuter Shortcut	College Park toward Greenbelt
Route map
Location

Hyattsville Crossing station is a Washington Metro station in Hyattsville, Maryland, on the Green Line and Yellow Line. It opened on December 11, 1993, as Prince George's Plaza, referencing the nearby Prince George's Plaza, now known as The Mall at Prince George's. The station has a unique layout in that it is an open-cut side platformed station with a parking garage directly over the tracks.

== Station layout ==
The station is located at the southwest corner of the East-West Highway (Maryland Route 410) and Belcrest Road intersection. The platform level is in an open-cut below ground level, containing two side platforms for each direction. This station has no canopy. Instead, a multilevel parking garage sits directly above the station and includes multiple taxi and bus stops. and a small surface parking lot on the side. Stairs and escalators lead from the ground level to the platform level. The station is surrounded by commercial and residential development, with pedestrian walkways leading to each. A pedestrian walkway immediately travels underneath the commercial development to the north and then over East-West Highway, connecting directly into The Mall at Prince George's. A Capital Bikeshare rental station sits at the northeast side of the station, opposite the station's eastern roundabout entrance.

== History ==
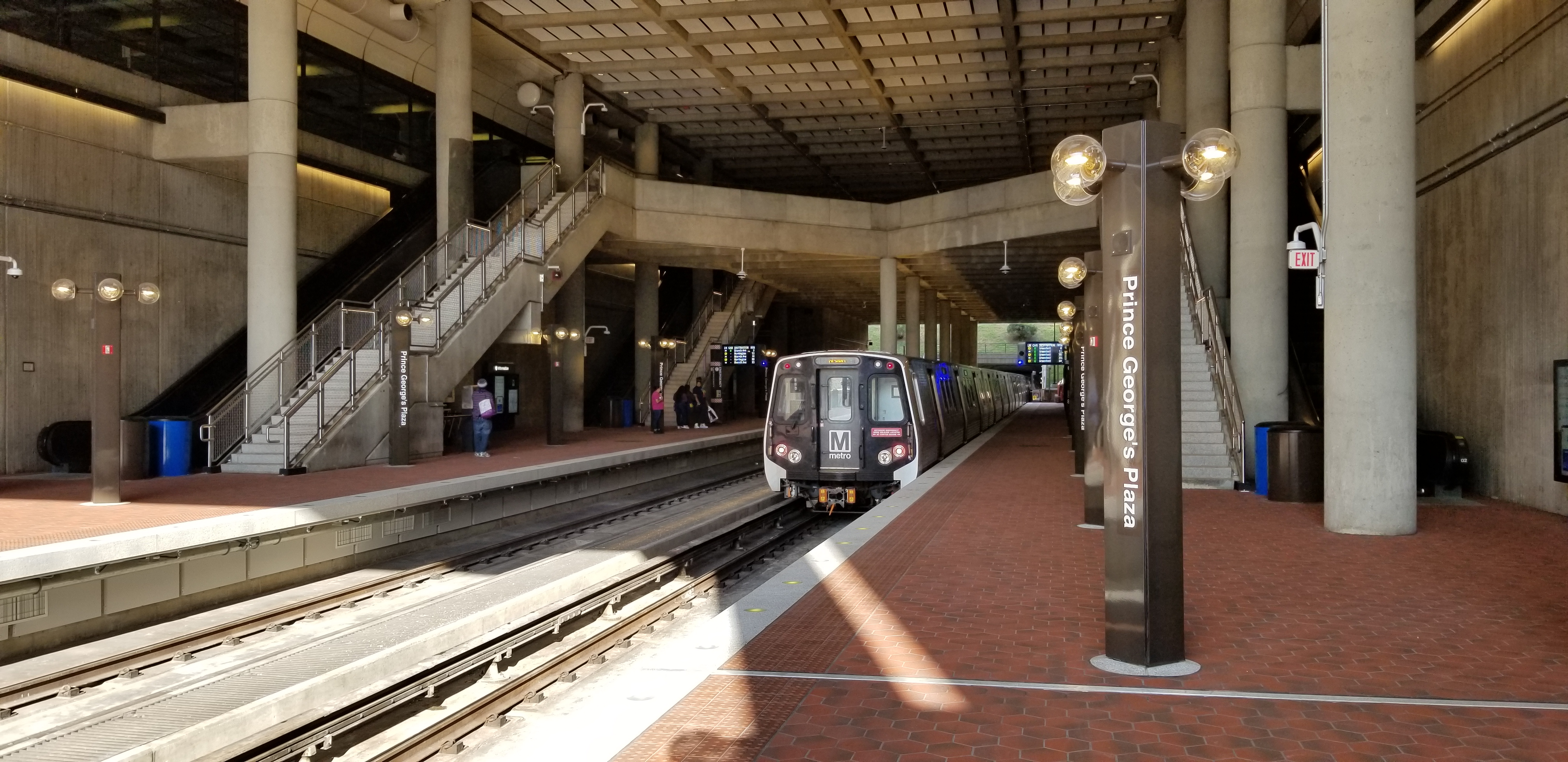
The station as Prince George’s Plaza with northbound Green Line departing in September 2021

The station is located in a commercial area of Hyattsville near The Mall at Prince George's, which, before receiving its second name in November 2004, was called Prince George's Plaza, at East-West Highway (Maryland Route 410) and Belcrest Road. Service began on December 11, 1993.

Originally, only Green Line trains served the station and ran between Fort Totten and Greenbelt. Eventually, this segment of the Green Line was connected with the rest of the Green Line in September 1999.

Rush hour Yellow Line trains began operating at this station on June 12, 2012, operating between Greenbelt and Franconia–Springfield or Huntington. However, this service was discontinued on June 25, 2017, because of budget cuts.

In May 2018, Metro announced an extensive renovation of platforms at twenty stations across the system. The platforms at the Greenbelt station would be rebuilt starting on May 29, 2021, through September 6, 2021.

In November 2020, WMATA approved a request from Prince George's County to change the name of the former Prince George's Plaza station to Hyattsville Crossing, despite survey results noting people prefer the name Prince George's Plaza due to the station being located in Prince George's County and in relation to The Mall at Prince George's while being situated within a plaza-like area. The new name took effect on September 11, 2022.

On May 7, 2023, the northeastern terminus of the Yellow Line was truncated from Greenbelt to Mount Vernon Square, following its reopening after a nearly eight-month-long major rehabilitation project on its bridge over the Potomac River and its tunnel leading into L'Enfant Plaza. From July 22 to September 4, 2023, the station was closed to improve rail system technologies, closing stations north of Fort Totten. Half of all Yellow Line service was re-extended to Greenbelt on December 31, 2025.
