= Greenbelt–Fort Totten Line =

WMATA bus route R3

P32
- Greenbelt–Fort Totten Line

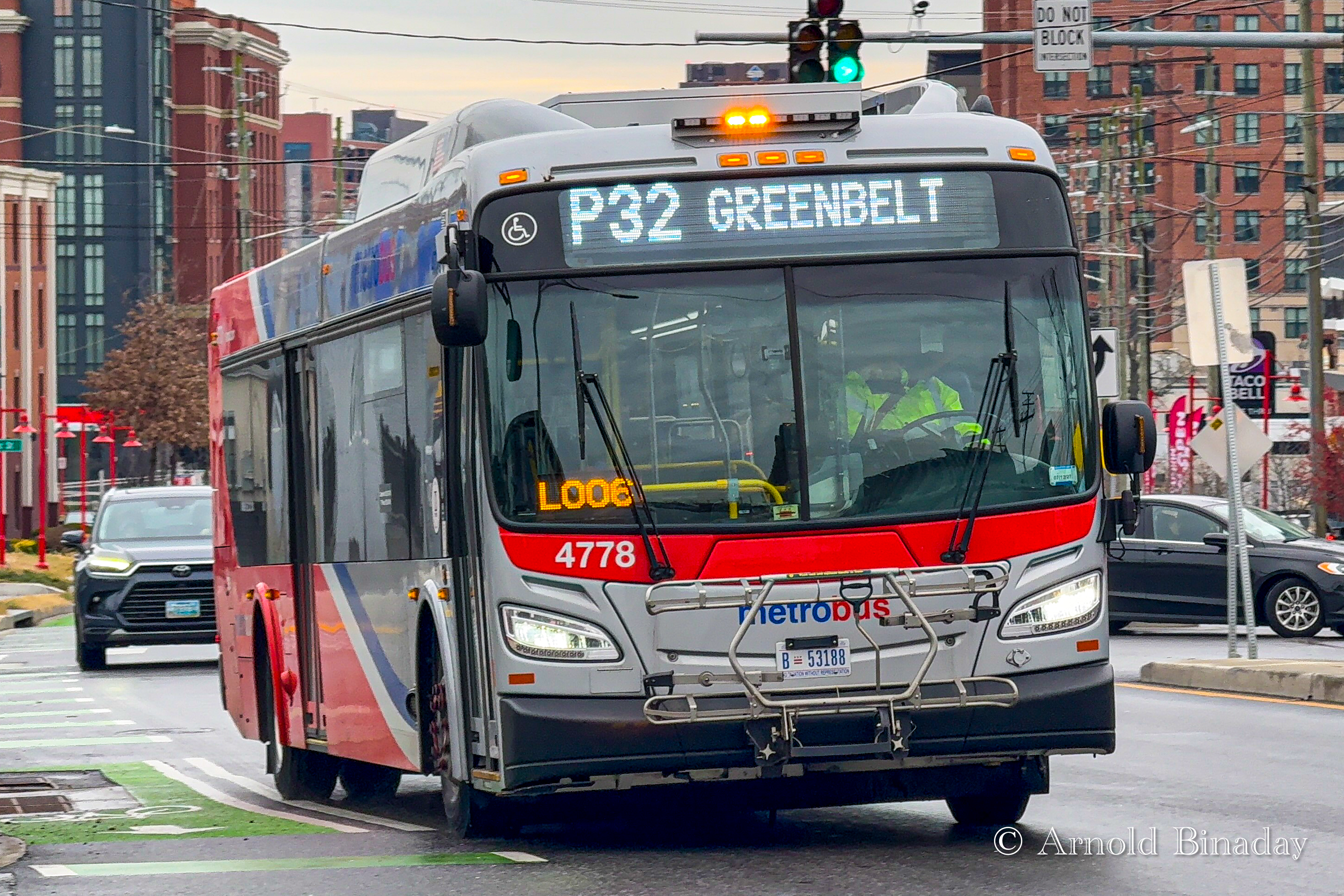
- Route P32 in College Park

Overview
- System: Metrobus
- Operator: Washington Metropolitan Area Transit Authority
- Garage: Landover
- Status: Active
- Began service: 1978 (original route); June 29, 2025 (new route)
- Ended service: June 17, 2012 (original route)
- Predecessors: F5, R3

Route
- Locale: Prince George's County, Northeast
- Communities served: Greenbelt, Berwyn Heights, College Park, Adelphi, University Park, Hyattsville, Chillum, Michigan Park, Fort Totten
- Landmarks served: Fort Totten station, West Hyattsville station, Hyattsville Crossing station, The Mall at Prince Georges, University of Maryland, Beltway Plaza Mall, Greenbelt station
- Start: Greenbelt station
- Via: Cherrywood Lane, Greenbelt Road, University Boulevard, Baltimore Avenue, Adelphi Road, Belcrest Road, East-West Highway, Ager Road, Chillum Road
- End: Fort Totten station

Service
- Level: Daily
- Frequency: 30 minutes
- Weekend frequency: 60 minutes
- Operates: 5:00 AM – 10:00 PM
- Timetable: Greenbelt-Fort Totten Line

The Greenbelt–Fort Totten Line, designated Route P32, is a daily bus route operated by the Washington Metropolitan Area Transit Authority between Greenbelt station of the Green and Yellow Lines of the Washington Metro, and Fort Totten station of the Green, Yellow and Red Lines of the Washington Metro. The route provides service between Greenbelt and Fort Totten daily, a service WMATA originally operated until June 17, 2012, then was reincarnated during WMATA's Better Bus Network on June 29, 2025. The route roughly takes 60 minutes to complete.

== Background ==
The P32 operates daily between Greenbelt station and Fort Totten station via Hyattsville Crossing station, connecting Greenbelt, Berwyn Heights, College Park, Adelphi, University Park, Hyattsville, Chillum, and Michigan Park residents. The line operates every 30 minutes during the weekdays and 60 minutes on weekends.

WMATA previously operated a Greenbelt–Fort Totten bus route as Route R3 prior to June 17, 2012, when it was cutback from Fort Totten station to Prince George's Plaza station and replaced by Route F6. The Greenbelt to Prince George's Plaza section was fully discontinued on March 27, 2016. The Greenbelt–Fort Totten Line was reincarnated during WMATA's Better Bus Redesign on June 29, 2025.

Route P32 operates out of Landover division.

== History ==
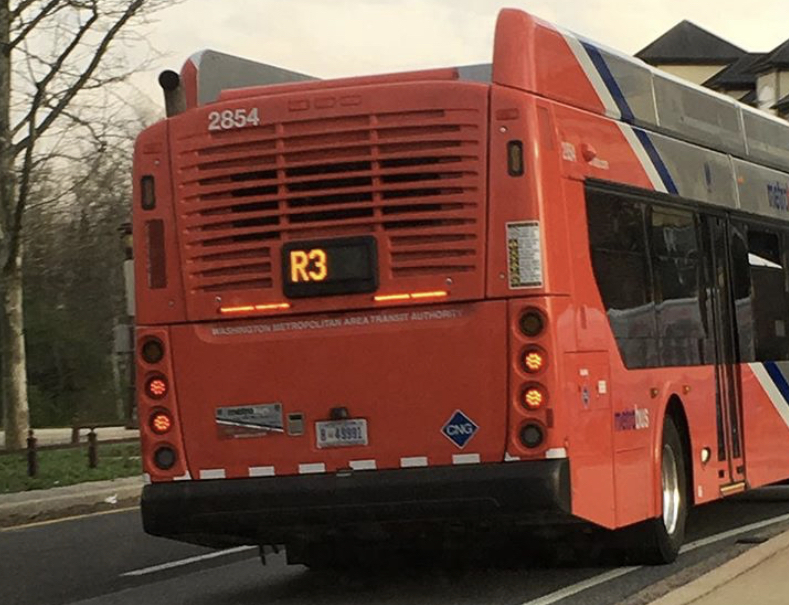
Route R3 at Prince George's Plaza (now Hyattsville Crossing) station on March 25, 2016, its final day of revenue service.

The original line was named as the Sargent Road Line and originally operated as a Capital Transit Company Bus Route in the 1940s, as Route F6, between the intersections of 12th Street NE & Quincy Street NE in Brookland, D.C. and intersection of Ager Road & Somerset Street in Green Meadows, Maryland, during rush hours, and would only operate only between Brookland and the intersection of Gallatin Street NE & South Dakota Avenue NE in North Michigan Park at all other times on weekdays.

Eventually, around the mid-1950's, the F6 was converted into a DC Transit Bus Route when all Capital Transit Company Streetcar and Bus Routes were converted into DC Transit Bus Routes. In the 1960s, the F6 was discontinued and replaced by new Routes F5 and F7. Both routes would operate during rush hours only between Prince George's Plaza and Waterside Mall (F5)/Federal Triangle (F7). Both routes would operate from Prince George's Plaza along Riggs Road, East-West Highway, and Toledo Terrace, then operate along the former F6 routing between the intersections of Riggs Road & East-West Highway and 13th Street NE & Quincy Street NE, then the route would operate via 13th Street NE, Rhode Island Avenue NE, 4th Street NE, T Street NE, 3rd Street NE (towards Prince George's Plaza), 2nd Street NE (towards Waterside Mall (F5)/ Federal Triangle (F7)), R Street NE, Eckington Place NE, Florida Avenue NE, First Street NE (towards Waterside Mall (F5)/ Federal Triangle (F7)), O Street NE (towards Prince George's Plaza), New York Avenue NW, and 11th/12th Streets NW. Route F6 was later reincarnated under the New Carrollton–Silver Spring Line.

Routes F5 and F7 became WMATA Metrobus Routes on February 4, 1973, when WMATA bought out DC Transit.

When Rhode Island Avenue station opened on March 27, 1976, Routes F5 and F7 were rerouted to serve the station. Later when Fort Totten station opened on February 19, 1978, route F5 was rerouted to operate between Fort Totten and Prince George's Plaza via Galloway Street NE, South Dakota Avenue NE, Gallatin Street NE, Sargent Road NE, Sargent Road, Riggs Road, East - West Highway, and Toledo Terrace, discontinuing service to Waterside Mall. Route F7 was also discontinued and replaced by the F5.

=== Original Greenbelt–Fort Totten Line ===
On December 11, 1993, when both Prince George's Plaza and Greenbelt stations opened, route F5 was discontinued and replaced by a new Route R3 named the Greenbelt–Fort Totten Line.

The R3 operated the same routing as the former F5 service between Fort Totten and Prince George's Plaza, however it would serve the Lewisdale neighborhood via 23rd street, Lewisdale Drive, and Fordham Street, replacing the former Route R6 Lewisdale loop. After Prince George's Plaza, route F3 would also serve Prince George's Plaza station before operating along Belcrest Road, East-West Highway, Adelphi Road, the newly constructed Archives II Building, Adelphi Road, Metzerott Road, University Boulevard East, Beltway Plaza, and Greenbelt Road, replacing the Route F6 which was rerouted to serve New Carrollton station. The new R3 operated daily (compared to the former F5 which only operated during weekday peak hours), with weekend trips only operating between Fort Totten and Prince George's Plaza station, and provided new Metrobus service on both Adelphi Road and Metzerott Road.

On January 13, 2001, R3 was rerouted to operate on Toledo Terrace past the intersection of Toledo Place, all the way up to the intersection of Belcrest Road and enter the Prince George's Plaza Mall from Belcrest Road, instead of cutting through the Prince George's Plaza parking lot from the intersection of Toledo Terrace itself.

On May 15, 2003, R3 was permanently rerouted to no longer directly enter the Prince George's Plaza mall, due to the Metrobus terminal inside the mall, along with the former G.C. Murphy site the bus used to operate in front of, were demolished to make room for a new Target Store to be constructed on their spot.

When the Mosaic Apartments were being constructed and a new roadblock was created on the eastern end of Prince George's Plaza station in early 2007, the R3 was rerouted along with other routes that served Prince George's Plaza station that formerly made a left onto Belcrest Road. The R3 was required to exit Prince George's Plaza by making a turn onto East-West Highway, then turn onto Belcrest Road when traveling in the direction of Fort Totten station, or remain straight past Belcrest Road until reaching the intersection of Adelphi Road when traveling in the direction of the Greenbelt station. This change was made as the new road block and sign by the site of where the Mosaic Apartments were constructed on the eastern end of Prince George's Plaza, which no longer permitted left turns from Prince George's Plaza onto Belcrest Road.

Between 2010 and 2011, WMATA proposed to eliminate the R3 and replace it with a rerouted Route F6 to Fort Totten station. The F6 was proposed to be rerouted from Silver Spring station to Fort Totten station, keeping its current routing between New Carrollton and the intersection of East-West Highway & Riggs Road, then the route would turn onto Riggs Road and operate on the R3 routing between the intersection of Riggs Road & East-West Highway & Fort Totten along East-West Highway, Riggs Road, Sargent Road. The R3 loop service in Lewisdale was proposed to be replaced by Route R2, which was proposed to operate along 23rd Street and University Boulevard, discontinuing service to Prince George's Plaza station, while Route C8 was proposed to operate to the Archives II building. This was proposed due to the R3 overlapping multiple bus routes, and would be easier to reroute existing routes to replace the R3 entirely.

=== Greenbelt–Prince George's Plaza Line ===
On June 17, 2012, route R3 was renamed into Greenbelt-Prince George's Plaza Line and was shortened to operate between Greenbelt station and Prince George's Plaza station during the weekday peak hours only with service between Prince Georges Plaza and Fort Totten station being replaced by a rerouted F6 renamed into the New Carrollton–Fort Totten Line. The R3 would also discontinue service through Beltway Plaza, only operating outside of the mall.

The F6 would have its same routing between New Carrollton station and the intersection of East-West Highway and Riggs Road, then the F6 would follow route R3's former routing by turning onto Riggs Road and continuing to Fort Totten via Sargent Road and Gallatin Street NE. Route R2 would replace the R3 segment in the Lewisdale Neighborhood, except it would not operate as a loop and instead operate up to University Boulevard before resuming its regular route on Riggs Road, discontinuing service to Prince George's Plaza station as a result. Route C8 was also rerouted to divert into the Archives II to supplement route R3. Route R3 would remain the same between Prince George's Plaza and Greenbelt station, but would discontinue the Beltway Plaza loop. Non-peak hour service to Greenbelt was eliminated while weekend service on Sargent Road was also discontinued as a result with no replacement due to the F6 operating on weekdays only.

During WMATA's FY2016 budget, WMATA proposed to eliminate Route R3 completely due to low ridership and many alternative routes available.

On March 27, 2016, WMATA announced the discontinuation of R3 service due to low ridership. The diversion into the National Archives at College Park was replaced by route C8 completely while other routes provide alternative service on route R3 former routing, except on Metzerott Road, where there was no replacement service. The reason WMATA decided to discontinue R3's service was because of the route's very low ridership levels/poor productivity since the June 17, 2012, ever since it was cutback to Prince George's Plaza, and discontinuing service Fort Totten station and Lewisdale, which had some of the highest ridership rates/productivity levels and will not be in service anymore.

=== Better Bus Redesign ===
In 2022, WMATA launched its Better Bus Redesign project, which aimed to redesign the entire Metrobus Network and is the first full redesign of the agency's bus network in its history.

In April 2023, WMATA launched its Draft Visionary Network. As part of the drafts, WMATA initially did not plan on having a Greenbelt–Fort Totten Line, instead having a Fort Totten-College Park Line as Route MD245 between Fort Totten station and College Park–University of Maryland station via Gallatin Street NE, Sargent Road, Riggs Road, East-West Highway, Ager Road, 23rd Avenue, Hyattsville Crossing station, Belcrest Road, Adelphi Road, University Bouelvard, Stadium Drive, University of Maryland, and Campus Drive.

A similar route to the former Route R3 and current Route C2 portion between Greenbelt station and the intersection of Greenbelt Road & University Boulevard East was also created. The route would then operate along University Boulevard, Meterzott Road, New Hampshire Avenue, University Boulevard, 23rd Avenue, and Ager Road, before terminating at West Hyattsville station. The proposed routing was named Route MD246.

During WMATA's Revised Draft Visionary Network, WMATA renamed the MD245 to the P32 and the MD246 to the P36. The P36 remained the same but the P32 was heavily changed to operate to Riggs Park via South Dakota Avenue NE, Nicholson Street NE, Chillum Place NE, and Eastern Avenue NE, then operate to College Park via Sargent Road, Chillum Road, Queens Chapel Road, Ager Road, West Hyattsville station, 23rd Avenue, East-West Highway, Hyattsville Crossing station, Belcrest Road, Toledo Road, and the proposed routing between Adelphi Road and College Park station. By the time the Proposed 2025 Network was released, WMATA dropped the P36 entirely and the P32 remained the same.

During the proposals, more changes were made. Route P32 was rerouted to instead terminate at Greenbelt station instead of College Park station, operating on the current C2 routing between University of Maryland and Greenbelt via Baltimore Avenue, Greenbelt Road, Cherrywood Lane, and Greenbelt Metro Drive, replacing the proposed P1X which was rerouted to serve IKEA Way in Beltsville. Service in Riggs Park was instead replaced by the proposed Route C71 and the proposed P31 would instead serve College Park station. The proposed P32 would bring the Greenbelt–Fort Totten Line back to service, having last ran on June 15, 2012.

On November 21, 2024, WMATA approved its Better Bus Redesign Network.

Beginning on June 29, 2025, the Greenbelt–Fort Totten Line was reincarnated to service as Route P32, operating between Greenbelt and Fort Totten stations via Gallatin Street NE, Sargent Road, Chillum Road, Queens Chapel Road, Ager Road, West Hyattsville station, 23rd Avenue, East-West Highway, Hyattsville Crossing station, Belcrest Road, Toledo Road, Adelphi Road, University Bouelvard, Stadium Drive, University of Maryland, Baltimore Avenue, Greenbelt Road, Cherrywood Lane, and Greenbelt Metro Drive. The new route would replace the former C2 and TheBus Routes 13 and 19, while also incorporating portions of former Routes F6 and F8.

The new Greenbelt–Fort Totten route is similar routing to the former Route R3 and pre-1993 F6 service, however unlike both routes, the P32 would operate the full route daily instead of weekdays only.
