= The Mall at Prince George's =

Coordinates: 38°58′05″N 76°57′22″W

- The logo of The Mall at Prince Georges, used since November 2004.
- Location: 3500 East West Highway, Hyattsville, Maryland, U.S.
- Opened: 1959
- Previous names: Prince George's Plaza (1959–2004)
- Developer: Eastern Shopping Centers
- Owner: PREIT
- Num. of stores: 60
- Num. of anchor tenants: 7
- Floor area: 910,352 square feet (84,574.5 m^{2})
- Floors: 1 with partial lower level (2 plus basement offices in JCPenney, 3 in Macy's, Ross Dress For Less and Marshalls are on lower level of Target extension)
- Public transit: Washington Metro: at Hyattsville Crossing; GoPGC: P43; Metrobus: M12, M44, P10, P30, P32, P33, P35; Shuttle-UM: 113, 133
- Website: www.mallatprincegeorges.com

The Mall at Prince George's, formerly known as (and still often referred to as) Prince George's Plaza (PG Plaza), is an enclosed regional shopping mall located in Hyattsville, Maryland, at the intersection of Belcrest Road and East-West Highway (Maryland Route 410). It is served by a Washington Metro station, Hyattsville Crossing. This station is on the Green and Yellow Lines. Located across Belcrest Road from the Mall is the University Town Center mixed-use development.

The Mall at Prince George's is anchored by Five Below, TJ Maxx, Ross Dress For Less, Marshalls, Macy's, Primark, and Target. It is currently owned and managed by PREIT.

== History ==
The mall opened as an open-air shopping center in 1959, known as the Prince George's Plaza (PGP). It was expanded several times and was enclosed circa 1977. It was known as Prince Georges Plaza until November 14, 2004, when it was renamed to its current name of The Mall at Prince George's following an extensive renovation.

=== Hecht Company ===
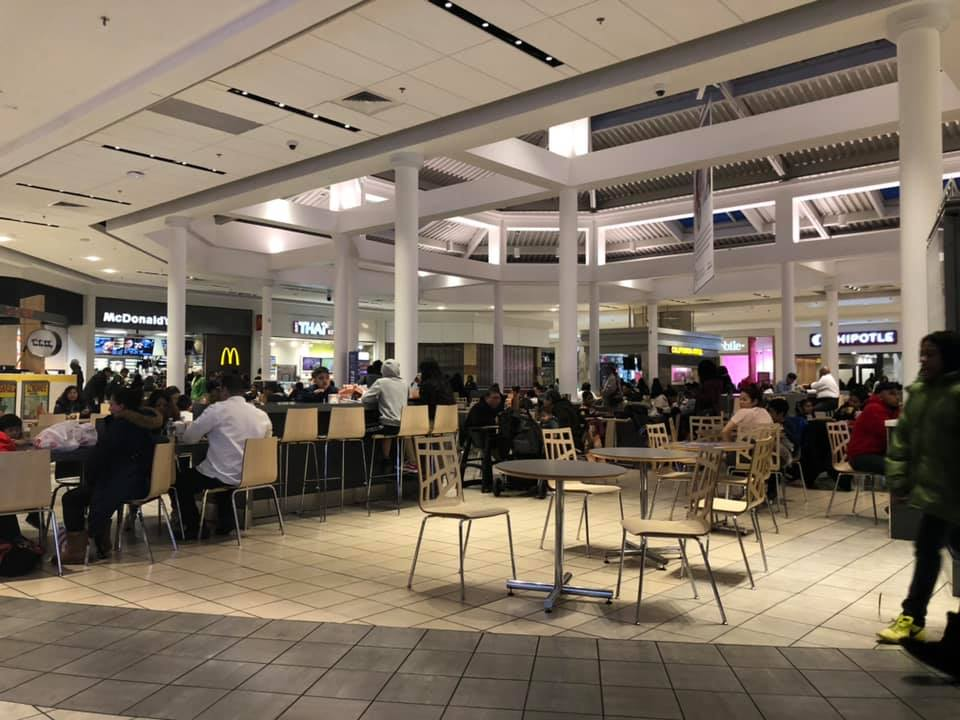
The Food Court at The Mall at Prince Georges

The opening of the Plaza's Hecht Company store on November 2, 1958, signaled the opening of Prince George's Plaza. It was the fourth D.C.-area store in the rapidly growing chain. An estimated 3,000 persons attended the opening for ceremonial speeches and the ribbon-cutting. The principal speaker was Maryland Gov. Theodore R. McKeldin. The governor purchased a six-foot aluminum ladder from the Hecht Company, which he said he would use in his recently purchased home in Baltimore. At the opening, Hecht's occupied nearly one-third of the 600,000 square feet (56,000 m^{2}) of business space, and developers anticipated 60 other stores. There was parking for some 4,000 cars.

In September 2006, the store was converted into a Macy's, following the disbandment of Hecht's.

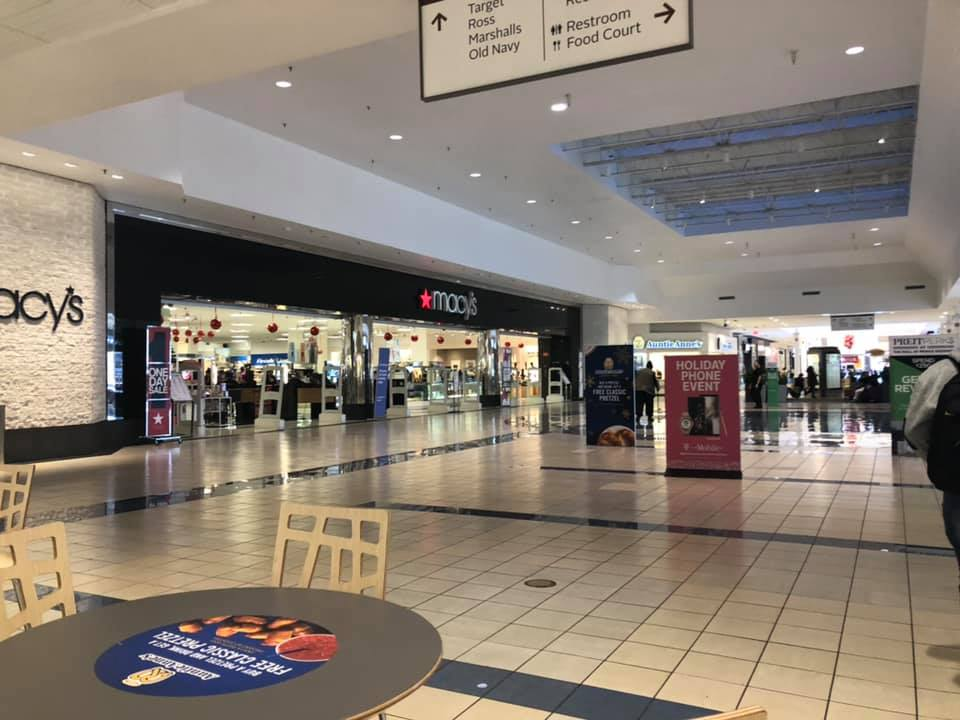
The Macys at The Mall of Prince Georges in 2019

=== Grand Union ===
The following month another anchor, Grand Union supermarket, opened its doors. On December 17, 1958, Santa Claus cut the red ribbon at 9 a.m. at the grand opening of the Grand Union store. He arrived by helicopter to ceremonially open the new 45,000-square-foot (4,200 m^{2}) store.

The store also featured a "food-o-matic display" that housed the canned and packaged goods. It also included a gourmet foods department featuring one of the largest varieties of the world's finest cheeses to be found anywhere in the metropolitan area. The store also featured a rotisserie for barbecued chicken, a service bakery, and fully automated check-out booths.

Food-a-rama, a local Baltimore chain, bought the Prince George's Plaza Grand Union store along with other Grand Union and Basics stores in Maryland and D.C. in 1984. The Hyattsville store was converted to a high-volume store. After the supermarket closed, Kids "R" Us occupied the space for several years, followed by Office Depot, which closed in March 2009 and which was replaced by Kids 4 Less, which in turn closed in 2013 to make way for TJ Maxx.

=== Raleigh's ===
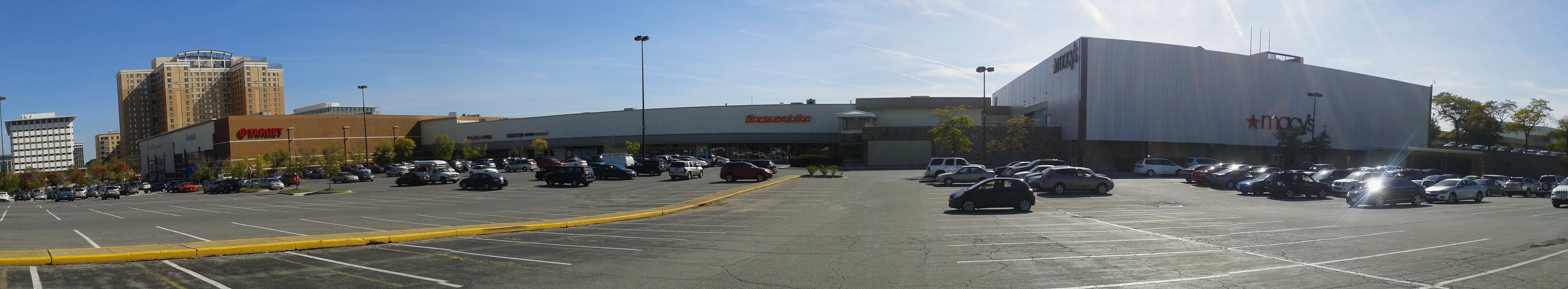
View of the mall from the parking lot

In December 1965, Raleigh Haberdasher announced plans to lease 20,000 square feet (1,900 m^{2}) in the Prince George's Plaza shopping center for its fifth store in the Washington area. The store opened in the spring of 1966. After Raleigh's closed the location in 1991, it was broken up into a variety of retail spaces. The entire Raleigh Haberdasher chain closed by the end of 1992. The former Raleigh's space was eventually demolished and rebuilt as Target (which opened late 2004), with Marshalls and Ross Dress for Less opening on the lower level of the new space shortly thereafter.

=== Woodward & Lothrop ===
Another local department store, Woodward & Lothrop, opened at Prince George's Plaza in August 1966. While building the Woodies store, two boys were killed when digging in a cave on a fragile hillside nearby. After the demise of the Woodies chain in 1995, the space was occupied by JCPenney.

On June 23, 2020, JCPenney announced that it would close in October 2020 as part of a plan to close 13 stores nationwide. Part of the former JC Penney building was demolished in 2022, with plans to be replaced by an apartment development. In early 2024, it was announced that Primark would open in the remaining space in 2026. The store was eventually completed and opened May 14, 2026.
