= Cherry Hill Park (campground) =

Campground in Maryland, US

Cherry Hill Park is a campground located in College Park, Maryland. Situated in Prince George's County, the location has served as a destination for locals and tourists since its establishment in the early 20th century. The park has RV & tent sites, log cabins, cottages, yurts, and glamping pods. Amenities include mini golf, fishing, golf cart rentals, a hot tub and sauna, and an on-site cafe.

The park is located in College Park, Maryland within a short driving distance from Washington, D.C. It offers buses to Metro and organizes sightseeing tours (as well as daily educational sightseeing sessions).

== History ==
Cherry Hill Park's story began in 1921, when Jay and Rose Gurevich purchased a plot of land near the campground's current location and operated it as a small poultry farm and general store. When travelers came through, Rose Gurevich allowed them to set up camp behind the store, and the Gurevich family entered the industry of hospitality for the first time.

After World War II, the business changed its name to Cherry Hill Trailer Park, then Cherry Hill Mobile Home Village, housing many GIs and young families.

As the interstate highway system grew, Americans began to travel for leisure, and many needed a place to stay while visiting Washington, DC. The Gurevich family changed the business name to Cherry Hill Campcity and it became a business that catered to travelers and tourists for the first time.

In the 1980s, Rose and Jacob's grandson Norman Gurevich and his wife, Joan, had a vision for a new kind of campground: a top-tier destination park that offered premium amenities, extensive services, full hook-ups, and room for even the biggest RVs. They moved the business one mile from its original location and built Cherry Hill Park as it currently stands today.

== Recognition ==
Cherry Hill Park has received several accolades for its outstanding facilities and services. In 2016, USA Today named it one of the ten best urban camping grounds. Thrillist included in their list of '12 Tranquil Camping Sites in the DC Area'.

== News coverage ==
Cherry Hill Park has had some news coverage, most notably a 2008 article covering the Obama inauguration and a 2017 article covering the inauguration of Donald Trump.
