= College Park–University of Maryland station =

Rail station in College Park, Maryland, US

College Park–U of Md
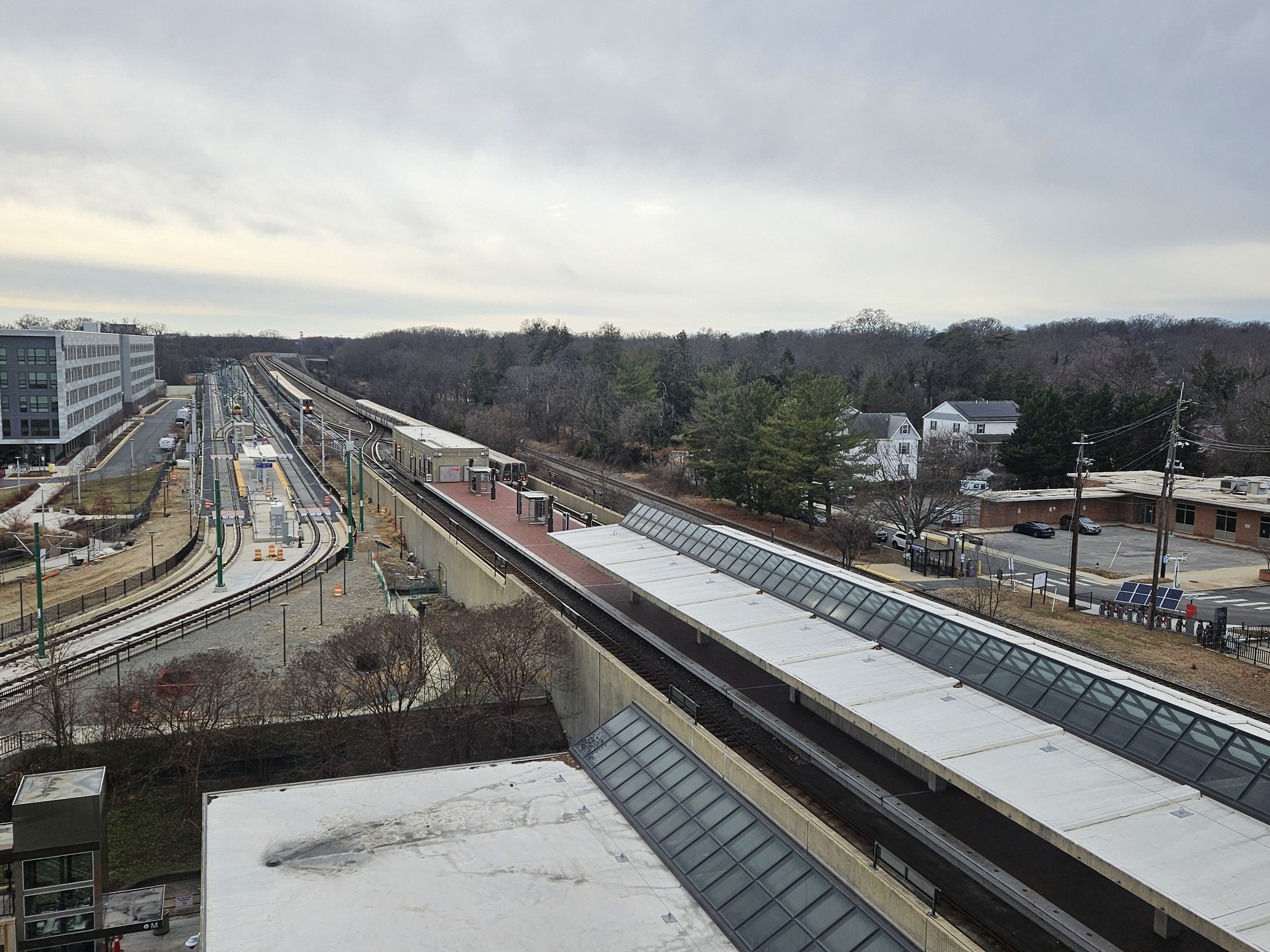
- Overhead view of the four station platforms in January 2026

General information
- Location: 4931 Calvert Road / 7202 Bowdoin Avenue; College Park, Maryland
- Coordinates: 38.9784°N 76.9282°W
- Owner: Washington Metropolitan Area Transit Authority (Metro station); Maryland Transit Administration (MARC and Purple Line stations)
- Line: Capital Subdivision
- Platforms: 1 island platform (Metro); 2 side platforms (MARC); 1 island platform (Purple Line – future)
- Tracks: 4 (2 each for Metro and MARC); 2 (Purple Line – future)
- Connections: Metrobus: M42, P10, P14, P31; GoPGC: P37; Shuttle-UM: 104, 109; MTA Maryland: 204

Construction
- Structure type: Elevated
- Parking: 1,870 spaces
- Cycle facilities: Capital Bikeshare, 81 racks, 40 lockers
- Accessible: Metro only

Other information
- Station code: E09

History
- Opened: December 11, 1993
- Rebuilt: 2021

Passengers
- 2025: 2,579 (average weekday)
- Rank: 68 of 98 (Metro)

Services
Preceding station	MARC	Following station
Riverdale toward Union Station	Camden Line	Greenbelt toward Camden Station
Silver Spring toward Brunswick	Camden Line limited service	Laurel toward Camden Station
Preceding station	Washington Metro	Following station
Hyattsville Crossing toward Huntington	Yellow Line	Greenbelt Terminus
Hyattsville Crossing toward Branch Avenue	Green Line	Greenbelt Terminus
Former services
Preceding station	Washington Metro	Following station
Hyattsville Crossing toward Farragut North	Green Line Commuter Shortcut	Greenbelt Terminus
Future services
Preceding station	Maryland Transit Administration	Following station
Baltimore Avenue–UMD toward Bethesda	Purple Line	Riverdale Park North–UMD toward New Carrollton
Route map
Location

College Park–University of Maryland station is a Washington Metro and MARC station located in College Park, Maryland, United States, near the University of Maryland, College Park campus. It is served by the Green Line and Yellow Line on the Metro while also providing limited service on the MARC Camden Line. The light rail Purple Line is planned to begin service at the station in late 2027.

== Station layout ==
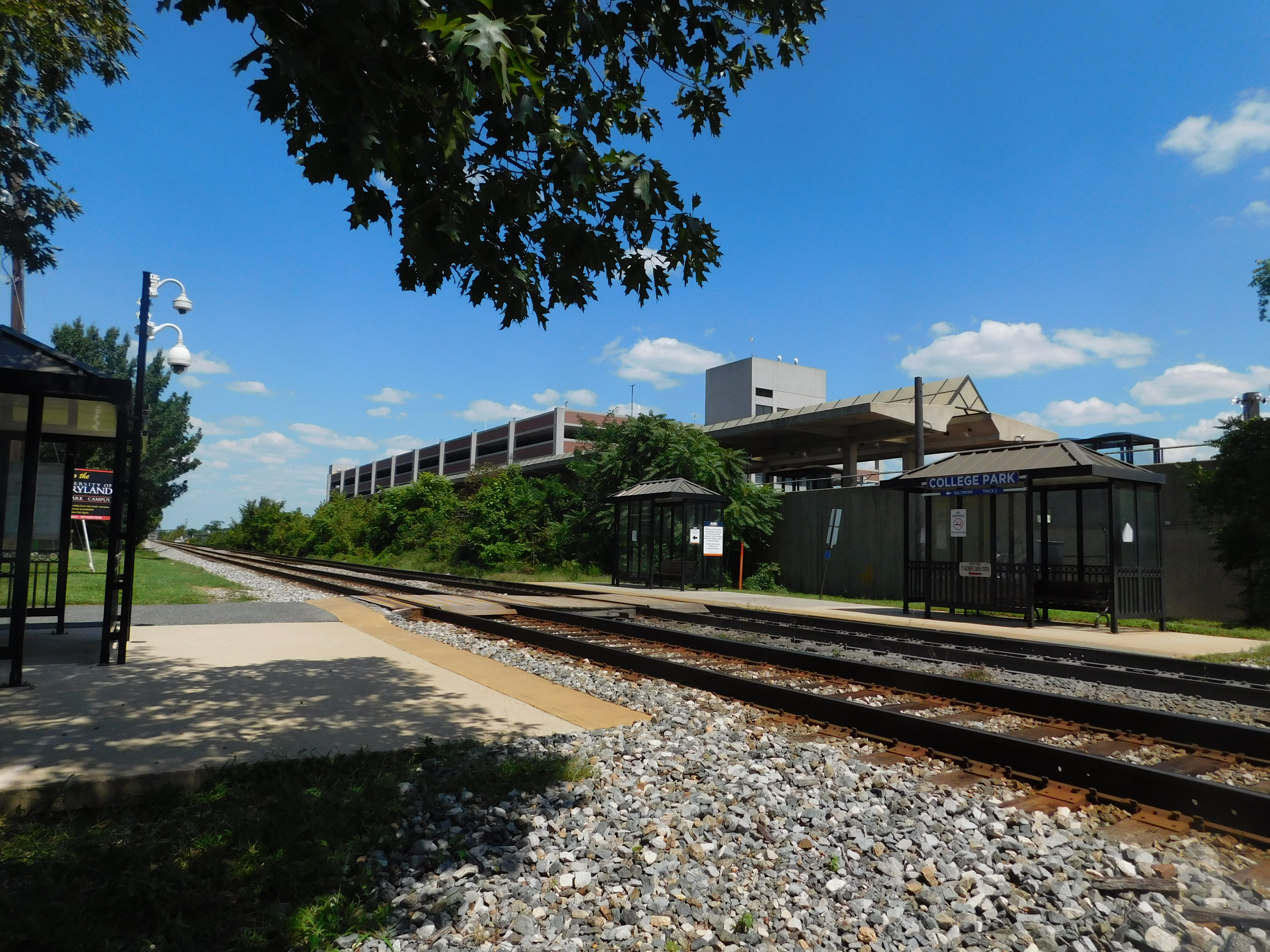
MARC platforms at College Park in August 2018 with the Washington Metro station platform in the distance

The station is located on the south side of Campus Parkway, about 1 mile (1.6 km) southeast of the campus center and adjacent to the College Park office park. The two-track Capital Subdivision (used by MARC) and the two-track Metro E Route run north-south through the station area, with the Capital Subdivision on the west side.

An island platform serves Metro trains, with entrances from both sides of the rail lines leading to the underground fare concourse. Two small side platforms serve MARC trains; they have an entrance from the west side and an underpass crossing under the Metro tracks. The Metro platform is accessible, but the MARC platforms are not.

A 1,345-space parking garage and a bus plaza are located on the east side of the station. The station is served by Metrobus, The Bus, Laurel Connect-a-Ride, and Shuttle-UM.

== History ==
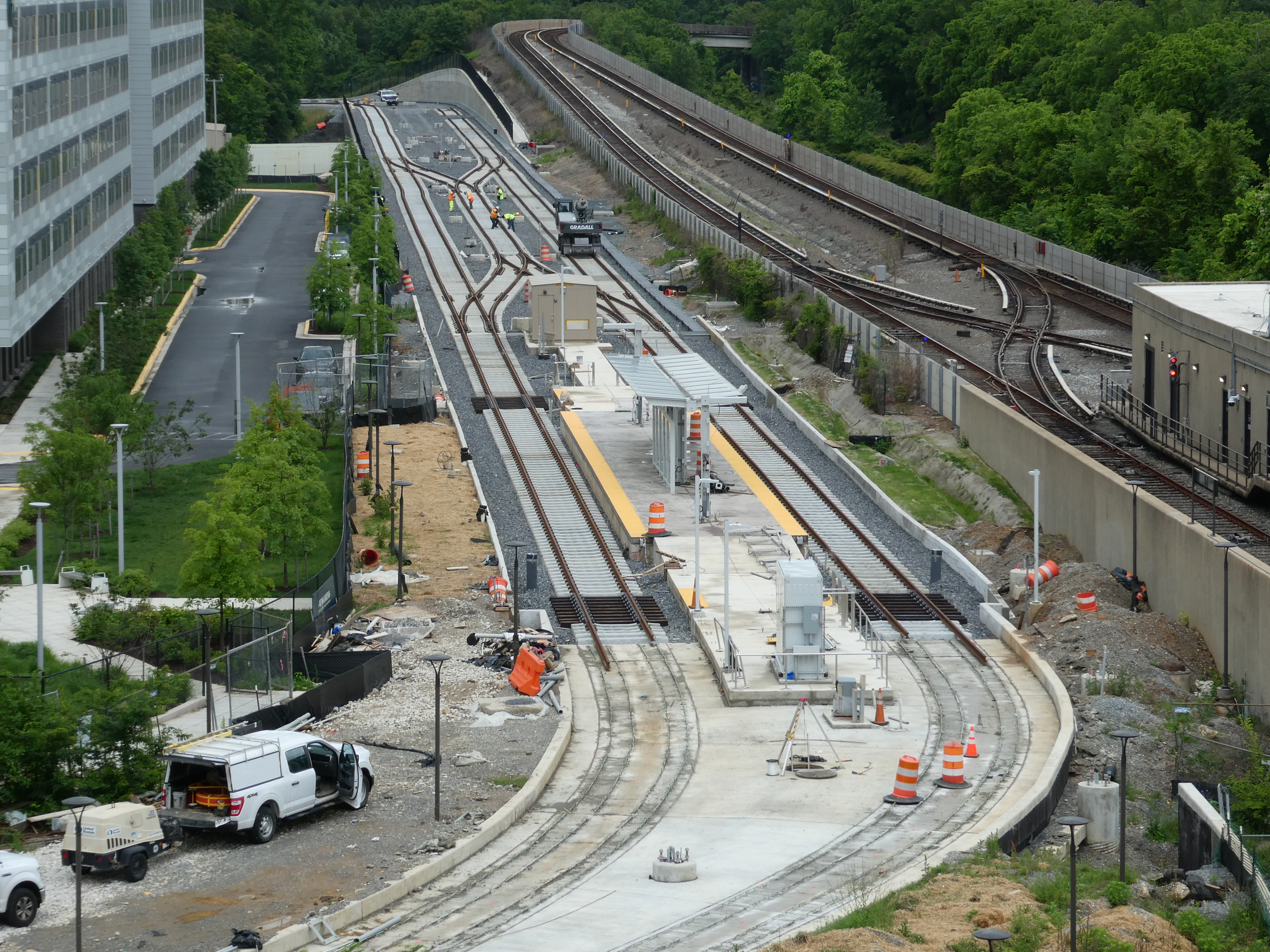
Platform and pocket track for the Purple Line under construction in May 2025

The Baltimore and Ohio Railroad (B&O) opened its Washington Branch, now the Capital Subdivision, in 1835. A station served the 1856-opened Maryland Agricultural College (now University of Maryland, College Park) by 1878. B&O Baltimore–Washington commuter service was taken over by MARC as the Camden Line in the 1980s.

Metro service at College Park began on December 11, 1993, with the extension of the Green Line to Greenbelt. The parking garage opened on June 25, 2005. In May 2012, the station became the first Metro station to feature a "Bike & Ride" bike station. A mesh enclosure built into the adjacent parking garage, the facility can hold up to 120 bikes and has 24-hour access.

Metro Yellow Line service was extended to Greenbelt, serving College Park, during peak hours from June 18, 2012, to June 25, 2017, as park of the "Rush+" program. It was again extended to Greenbelt at all times on May 25, 2019. From March 26 to June 28, 2020, the station was closed due to the 2020 coronavirus pandemic. The Metro station was closed from May 29 to September 6, 2021, while the platform was rebuilt. Yellow Line service was suspended from September 10, 2022, to May 7, 2023. It was cut back to Mount Vernon Square upon reopening, no longer serving College Park. From July 22 to September 4, 2023, the Green Line north of Fort Totten (including College Park) was closed for maintenance work. Every other Yellow Line train was extended to Greenbelt on December 31, 2025.

The Purple Line, a light rail line, is under construction and planned to open in late 2027. It will have an island platform on the east side of the Metro tracks next to the bus loop, which was reconstructed in 2021. In May 2024, the Federal Transit Administration awarded the MTA $1.4 million for design and engineering work to make the MARC station accessible. The new platforms would be 600 feet (180 m) long.
