= Baltimore Avenue–UMD station =

Future light rail station in Maryland

Coordinates: 38.9855°N 76.9366°W

Baltimore Avenue–UMD
- The station and a test train in September 2026

General information
- Location: Rossborough Lane at Baltimore Avenue; College Park, Maryland
- Owner: Maryland Transit Administration
- Platforms: 2 side platforms
- Tracks: 2

Construction
- Parking: None
- Accessible: yes

History
- Opening: 2027 (scheduled)

Services
Preceding station	Maryland Transit Administration	Following station
Campus Drive–UMD toward Bethesda	Purple Line	College Park Metro–UMD toward New Carrollton
Location

Baltimore Avenue–UMD station is an under-construction light rail station in College Park, Maryland, that will be served by the Purple Line. The station will have two side platforms flanking Rossborough Lane just east of Baltimore Avenue. It will be one of five stations serving the University of Maryland, College Park (UMD). As of 2026, the Purple Line is planned to open in late 2027.
