= Langley Park–Cheverly Line =

F8
- Langley Park–Cheverly Line

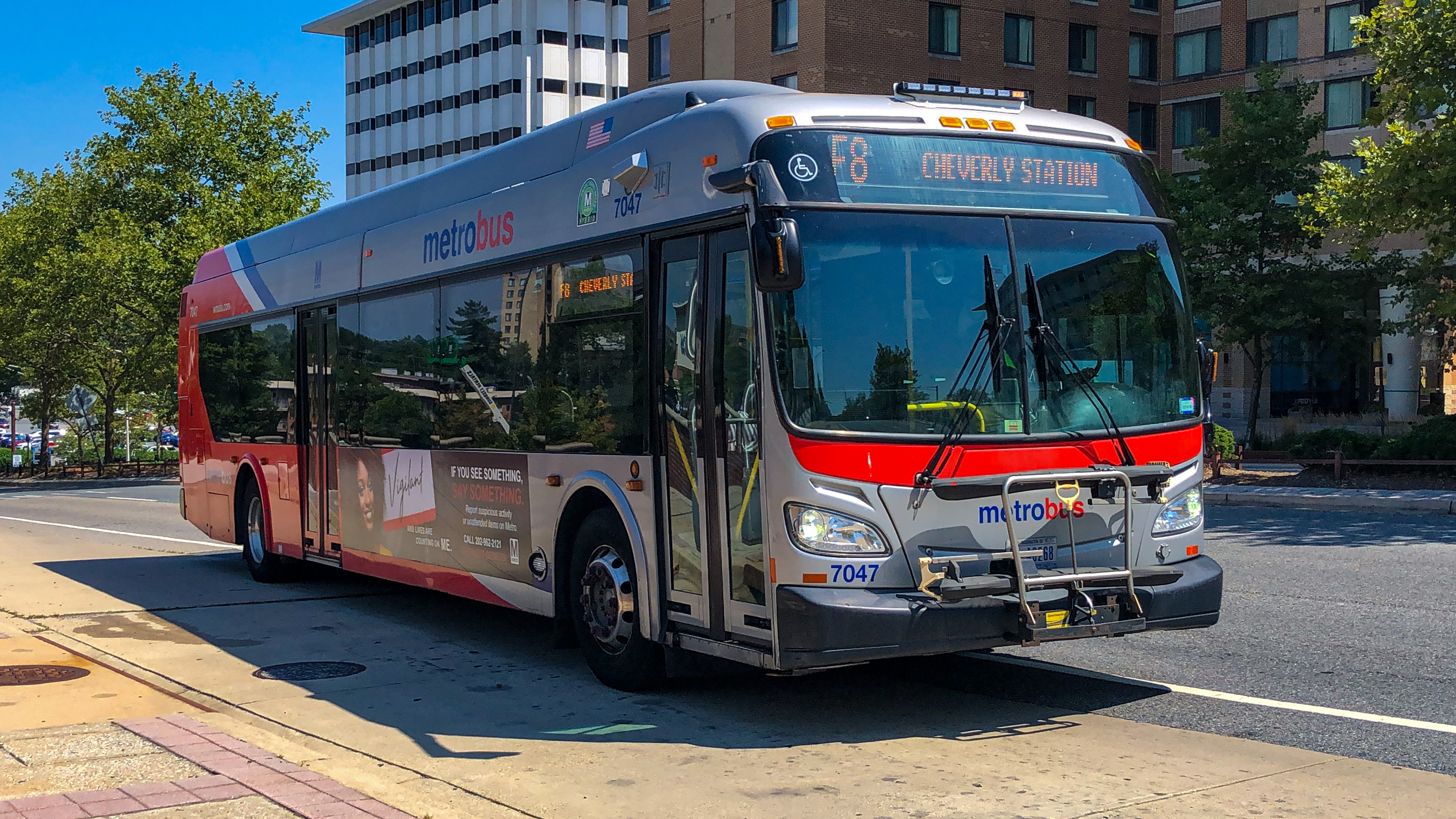
- Route F8 at Hyattsville Crossing

Overview
- System: Metrobus
- Operator: Washington Metropolitan Area Transit Authority
- Garage: Landover
- Livery: Local
- Status: Discontinued
- Ended service: June 29, 2025

Route
- Locale: Prince George's County
- Communities served: Langley Park, Hyattsville, Landover, Cheverly, Lewisdale, Peace Cross, Bladensburg
- Landmarks served: Cheverly station, Prince George’s Hospital, Peace Cross, West Hyattsville station, Hyattsville Crossing station, The Mall at Prince George's, Takoma Langley Crossroads Transit Center
- Start: Cheverly station
- Via: University Blvd, Adelphi Road, Queens Chapel Road, Annapolis Road, Landover Road, Cheverly Avenue
- End: Takoma Langley Crossroads Transit Center

Service
- Level: Daily
- Frequency: 30-38 minutes (Rush Hour); 52-65 minutes (Midday and Weekday Evening Service); 60-65 minutes (Weekends)
- Operates: 5:35 AM – 7:52 PM (Weekdays); 5:42 AM – 8:28 PM (Saturday); 8:53 AM – 7:00 PM (Sunday)
- Ridership: 359,617 (FY 2024)
- Transfers: SmarTrip only
- Timetable: Langley Park-Cheverly Line

The Langley Park–Cheverly Line, designated Route F8, was a daily bus route operated by the Washington Metropolitan Area Transit Authority between the Cheverly Metro station of the Silver and Orange Lines of the Washington Metro and Takoma – Langley Crossroads Transit Center in Langley Park, Maryland. The line operated every 30–35 minutes during peak hours and every 60–65 minutes at all other times. F8 trips were roughly 54–60 minutes. The route was discontinued during WMATA's Better Bus Redesign on June 29, 2025 with portions of the route taken over by other WMATA Routes and TheBus.

== Route ==
Route F8 operated on weekdays between 5:35 AM and 8:41 PM, Saturdays between 5:47 AM and 9:22 PM, and Sundays between 9:55 AM and 7:00 PM. Route F8 operated out of Landover Division at all times. It originally operated out of Bladensburg until 1989.

=== F8 Stops ===
Bus stop	Direction	Connections
Prince George's County, Maryland
Cheverly Bus Bay B	Northbound station, Southbound terminal	Metrobus: F1, F12, F13; TheBus: 18, 23; Washington Metro:
Cheverly Avenue / Columbia Park Road	Northbound	Metrobus: F13; TheBus: 18
Cheverly Avenue / Arbor Street	Bidirectional	Metrobus: F13; TheBus: 18
Cheverly Avenue / Arbor Street	Bidirectional	Metrobus: F13; TheBus: 18
Cheverly Avenue / Cheverly Circle	Northbound	Metrobus: F13; TheBus: 18
Cheverly Avenue / Euclid Street	Southbound	Metrobus: F13; TheBus: 18
Cheverly Avenue / Belleview Parkway	Bidirectional	Metrobus: F13; TheBus: 18
Cheverly Avenue / Forest Road	Bidirectional	Metrobus: F13; TheBus: 18
Cheverly Avenue / Inwood Street	Bidirectional	Metrobus: F13; TheBus: 18
Cheverly Avenue / Kilmer Street	Bidirectional	Metrobus: F13; TheBus: 18
Cheverly Avenue / Lombard Street	Bidirectional	Metrobus: F13; TheBus: 18
Cheverly Avenue / Montrose Road	Bidirectional	Metrobus: F13; TheBus: 18
Hospital Drive / Landover Road	Bidirectional	Metrobus: L12, F1, F13
Hospital Drive / County Health Center	Bidirectional	Metrobus: L12, F1, F13
Landover Road / 58th Avenue	Northbound	Metrobus: F1; TheBus: 18
Landover Road / 58th Place	Southbound	Metrobus: F1; TheBus: 18
Landover Road / 57th Avenue	Southbound	Metrobus: F1; TheBus: 18
Landover Road / 56th Avenue	Bidirectional	Metrobus: F1; TheBus: 18
Landover Road / 55th Avenue	Bidirectional	Metrobus: F1; TheBus: 18
Landover Road / Annapolis Road	Southbound	Metrobus: F1, T18; TheBus: 18
Annapolis Road / 54th Street	Bidirectional	Metrobus: F1, T18; TheBus: 18
Annapolis Road / 53rd Avenue	Northbound	Metrobus: F1, T18; TheBus: 18
Annapolis Road / 53rd Place	Southbound	Metrobus: F1, T18; TheBus: 18
Annapolis Road / Bladensburg Elementary School	Bidirectional	Metrobus: F1, T18; TheBus: 18
Annapolis Road / Edmonston Road	Bidirectional	Metrobus: F1, T14, T18; TheBus: 18
Annapolis Road / 48th Street	Bidirectional	Metrobus: F1, T14, T18; TheBus: 18
Annapolis Road / 46th Street	Bidirectional	Metrobus: F1, T14, T18; TheBus: 18
Baltimore Avenue / #4319	Bidirectional	
Charles Armentrout Drive / Baltimore Avenue	Bidirectional	
Rhode Island Avenue / 42nd Place	Bidirectional	Metrobus: 83; TheBus: 13, 17
Rhode Island Avenue / Country Service Building	Bidirectional	Metrobus: 83; TheBus: 13, 17
Baltimore Avenue / Gallatin Street	Bidirectional	Metrobus: 83; TheBus: 13, 17
Baltimore Avenue / Hamilton Street	Northbound	Metrobus: 83; TheBus: 17
Baltimore Avenue / Jefferson Street	Southbound	Metrobus: 83; TheBus: 17
Jefferson Street / 44th Avenue	Bidirectional	
Jefferson Street / 43rd Avenue	Bidirectional	
Jefferson Street / 42nd Avenue	Bidirectional	TheBus: 13
Jefferson Street / 41st Avenue	Bidirectional	
Jefferson Street / 40th Avenue	Bidirectional	Metrobus: 86
Jefferson Street / 38th Avenue	Bidirectional	
38th Avenue / Hamilton Street	Northbound	Metrobus: 86; TheBus: 12, 18
Hamilton Street / 38th Avenue	Southbound	Metrobus: 86; TheBus: 12, 13, 18
Hamilton Street / 37th Avenue	Bidirectional	TheBus: 12, 13, 18
Hamilton Street / 36th Avenue	Bidirectional	TheBus: 12, 13, 18
Hamilton Street / 35th Avenue	Northbound	TheBus: 12, 13, 18
Hamilton Street / Queens Chapel Road	Southbound	TheBus: 12, 13, 18
Hamilton Street / 31st Avenue	Bidirectional	Metrobus: F6, F8, R4; TheBus: 12, 13
West Hyattsville Bus Bays D and E	Bidirectional	Metrobus: F1, F6, R4; TheBus: 12, 13; Washington Metro:
Hamilton Street / Ager Road	Bidirectional	Metrobus: F6, F8, R4; TheBus: 12, 13
Hamilton Street / 31st Avenue	Bidirectional	Metrobus: F6, F8, R4; TheBus: 12, 13
Hamilton Street / 31st Avenue	Bidirectional	Metrobus: F6, F8, R4; TheBus: 12, 13
Queens Chapel Road / Hamilton Manor Drive	Southbound	Metrobus: F6, R4
Queens Chapel Road / Jefferson Street	Northbound	Metrobus: F6, R4
Queens Chapel Road / Lancer Drive	Bidirectional	Metrobus: F6, R4; TheBus: 18
Queens Chapel Road / Sacred Heart Home	Bidirectional	Metrobus: F6, R4; TheBus: 18
Queens Chapel Road / Nicholson Street	Bidirectional	Metrobus: F6, R4; TheBus: 18
Queens Chapel Road / Oliver Street	Bidirectional	Metrobus: F6, R4; TheBus: 18
Belcrest Road / Queens Chapel Road	Bidirectional	Metrobus: 86, F4, F6, R4; TheBus: 18
Hyattsville Crossing Bus Bays C and H	Bidirectional	Metrobus: 86, C4, F4, F6, R4; TheBus: 13, 14, 18; Shuttle-UM: 113; Washington Metro:
Belcrest Road / #6505	Northbound	Metrobus: C4, F6, R4; TheBus: 13, 14; Shuttle-UM
Belcrest Road / Freedom Way	Southbound	Metrobus: C4, F6, R4; TheBus: 13, 14; Shuttle-UM
Toledo Road / Belcrest Road	Bidirectional	Metrobus: C4, F6, R4; TheBus: 13, 14; Shuttle-UM
Toledo Road / Adelphi Road	Bidirectional	TheBus: 13, 14; Shuttle-UM (Southbound only)
Adelphi Road / Toledo Road	Northbound	
Adelphi Road / Underwood Street	Northbound	Metrobus: F6
Adelphi Road / Belcrest Road	Southbound	Metrobus: F6
Adelphi Road / Van Buren Street	Bidirectional	Metrobus: F6
Adelphi Road / Wells Parkway	Bidirectional	Metrobus: F6
Adelphi Road / Pennsylvania Street	Bidirectional	Metrobus: F6
Adelphi Road / Rutgers Street	Bidirectional	Metrobus: F6
University Boulevard / Tulane Drive	Bidirectional	Metrobus: C2
University Boulevard / 25th Avenue	Bidirectional	Metrobus: C2
University Boulevard / 23rd Avenue	Bidirectional	Metrobus: C2, R2; TheBus: 18
University Boulevard / Riggs Road	Bidirectional	Metrobus: C2, C4, R1, R2; TheBus: 18; MTA: Purple Line (at Riggs Road station)(Planned)
University Boulevard / Riggs Road	Northbound	Metrobus: C2, C4, R1, R2; TheBus: 18
15th Avenue / University Boulevard	Bidirectional	TheBus: 18
Kanawha Street / 15th Avenue	Bidirectional	TheBus: 18
Kanawha Street / 14th Avenue	Northbound	TheBus: 18
14th Avenue / Kanawha Street	Southbound	TheBus: 18
14th Avenue / Langley Way	Bidirectional	TheBus: 18
Merrimac Drive / 14th Avenue	Bidirectional	TheBus: 18
Merrimac Drive / New Hampshire Avenue	Bidirectional	Metrobus: K6; TheBus: 18
Merrimac Drive / 12th Avenue	Southbound	
Merrimac Drive / Tehona Drive	Southbound	
Takoma Langley Bus Bay C	Northbound terminal, Southbound station	Metrobus: C2, C4, K6, K9; Ride On: 15, 16, 17, 18, 25; TheBus: 18; Shuttle-UM: 129; MTA: Purple Line (Planned)

== History ==
The line originally operated as a DC Transit Bus Route as the Prince George's–Langley Park Line and was designated as Route G8 which began service in April, 1960 between Langley Park and Prince George's Hospital, via Merrimac Drive, 14th Avenue, Kanawha Street, 15th Avenue, University Boulevard, Campus Drive, Adelphi Road, Toledo Road, Prince George's Plaza Shopping Center, Belcrest Road, Queens Chapel Road, Hamilton Street, 38th Avenue, Jefferson Street, Baltimore Avenue, Annapolis Road, and Landover Road.

The line was eventually converted into a WMATA Metrobus Route on February 4, 1973 when WMATA acquired DC Transit. On December 3, 1978, G8 was simply renamed as route "F8", even though it retained its same exact routing.

Around 1992, when Charles Armentrout Drive opened in Hyattsville, F8 was minorly rerouted to divert off Baltimore Avenue (U.S. Alt Route 1) onto Charles Armentrout Drive and then use Rhode Island Avenue (U.S. Route 1) to get back to Baltimore Avenue (U.S. Route 1).

On December 11, 1993, F8 was extended from its original terminus at Prince George's Hospital to the Cheverly station, via Cheverly Avenue to replace the segment of F2's routing that got discontinued. F8 was also rerouted to serve the newly opened West Hyattsville and Prince George's Plaza stations.

On May 15, 2003, the former Metrobus bus bays in front of the former G.C. Murphy store inside Prince George's Plaza, were demolished in order to build a new Target store. Route F8 stopped directing entering into and looping inside the Prince George's Plaza.

On December 30, 2012, the, line was renamed from the Prince George's–Langley Park Line to the Langley Park–Cheverly Line.

When the Takoma Langley Crossroads Transit Center opened on December 22, 2016, the F8 was rerouted, along with several other Metrobus, Ride On buses, Shuttle UM and TheBus routes, to serve the newly opened Transit Center. Route F8 would serve Bus Bay C.

In 2018, WMATA proposed to reroute the F8 along 23rd Avenue in Lewisdale to replace Route R2 and discontinue service along Adelphi Road. This was proposed to streamline the R2 along Riggs Road.

During the COVID-19 pandemic, route F8 was relegated to operate on its Saturday schedule beginning on March 16, 2020. However on March 18, 2020, the line was further reduced to operate on its Sunday schedule. Weekend service was also suspended beginning on March 21, 2020. On August 23, 2020, additional service was added to route F8 along with its weekend service being restored.

On September 26, 2020, WMATA proposed to reduce the frequency of buses to every 60 minutes on the F8 due to low federal funding. Later in February 2021 during WMATA's FY2022 Budget crisis, WMATA proposed to eliminate the F8 beginning in January 2022. Subsequently on April 22, 2021, WMATA approved the FY2022 budget and received federal funding to avoid service cuts.

On June 10, 2021, WMATA proposed to restore the line's pre-pandemic schedule as part of WMATA's Pandemic Recovery Plan. Full service was restored on September 5, 2021.

Due to rising cases of the COVID-19 Omicron variant, the line was reduced to its Saturday service on weekdays beginning on January 10, 2022. Full weekday service resumed on February 7, 2022.

In 2024 during WMATA's FY2024 Budget crisis, WMATA proposed to eliminate all F8 service. However on April 25, 2024, Metro’s Board of Directors approved a $4.8 billion capital and operating budget which avoided service cuts.

=== Better Bus Redesign ===
In 2022, WMATA launched its Better Bus Redesign project, which aimed to redesign the entire Metrobus Network and is the first full redesign of the agency's bus network in its history.

In April 2023, WMATA launched its Draft Visionary Network. As part of the drafts, WMATA proposed to split the F8 into different portions.

The portion between Cheverly station and the intersection of Annapolis Road & Baltimore Avenue was renamed to Route MD342 in the drafts and was modified to operate between Takoma station and Capitol Heights station via Martin Luther King Jr. Highway, Columbia Pike Road, Cheverly station, Cheverly Avenue, Landover Road, Hospital Drive, Prince George's Hospital, Annapolis Road, Bladensburg Road, 8th Avenue, Hamilton Street, West Hyattsville station, Queens Chapel Road, Chillum Road, Eastern Avenue, and Carroll Street. The line would be a combination of Routes F1, F2, and F8.

The portion between Prince George's Hospital and Hyattsville Crossing station was also modified to no longer serve West Hyattsville station, and instead operate between Cheverly station and Highview Apartments via via Arbor Street, Tuxedo Road, Kenilworth Avenue, Pepsi Place, Hospital Drive, Prince George's Hospital, Landover Road, Annapolis Road, Baltimore Avenue, Charles Armentrout Drive, Rhode Island Avenue, Jefferson Street, 42nd Avenue, Queensbury Road, Hyattsville Crossing station, East-West Highway, Toledo Terrace, Northwest Drive, Dean Drive, and Highview Terrace. The line was named Route MD344 in the proposals and was a combination of portions from Routes F1, F2, F8, and R4.

During WMATA's Revised Draft Visionary Network, WMATA renamed Route MD342 to Route P43 and changed the route to match the same routing as the current TheBus Route 18 route between Takoma Langley Crossroads Transit Center and Addison Road station, and took over much of the F8 service between Cheverly station and Takoma Langley Crossroads Transit Center except the route would not operate to West Hyattsville station and Prince George's Hospital or along Adelphi Road, Toledo Road, Belcrest Road, Jefferson Street, Charles Armentrout Drive, and Baltimore Avenue. Route MD344 was merged with the proposed Route MD252 and was renamed to Route P42, and would operate between Takoma station and New Carrollton station via Fort Lincoln. Route F8 service along Adelphi Road, Toledo Road, and Belcrest Road was taken over by the proposed Route P32, and service along Jefferson Street was taken over by the proposed Route P10. There was no replacement service along Charles Armentrout Drive and Baltimore Avenue. All changes were then proposed during WMATA's 2025 Proposed Network.

On November 21, 2024, WMATA approved its Better Bus Redesign Network.

Beginning on June 29, 2025, all Route F8 service was discontinued and replaced by a combination of rerouted Metrobus routes and TheBus routes with TheBus Route P43 being the main replacement, while Metrobus Routes P10, P32, and P33 partially replaced the F8.
