= Riggs Road Line =

Bus route in Maryland and Washington, DC, US

P15, P16
- Riggs Road–Adelphi Line; Riggs Road–White Oak Line

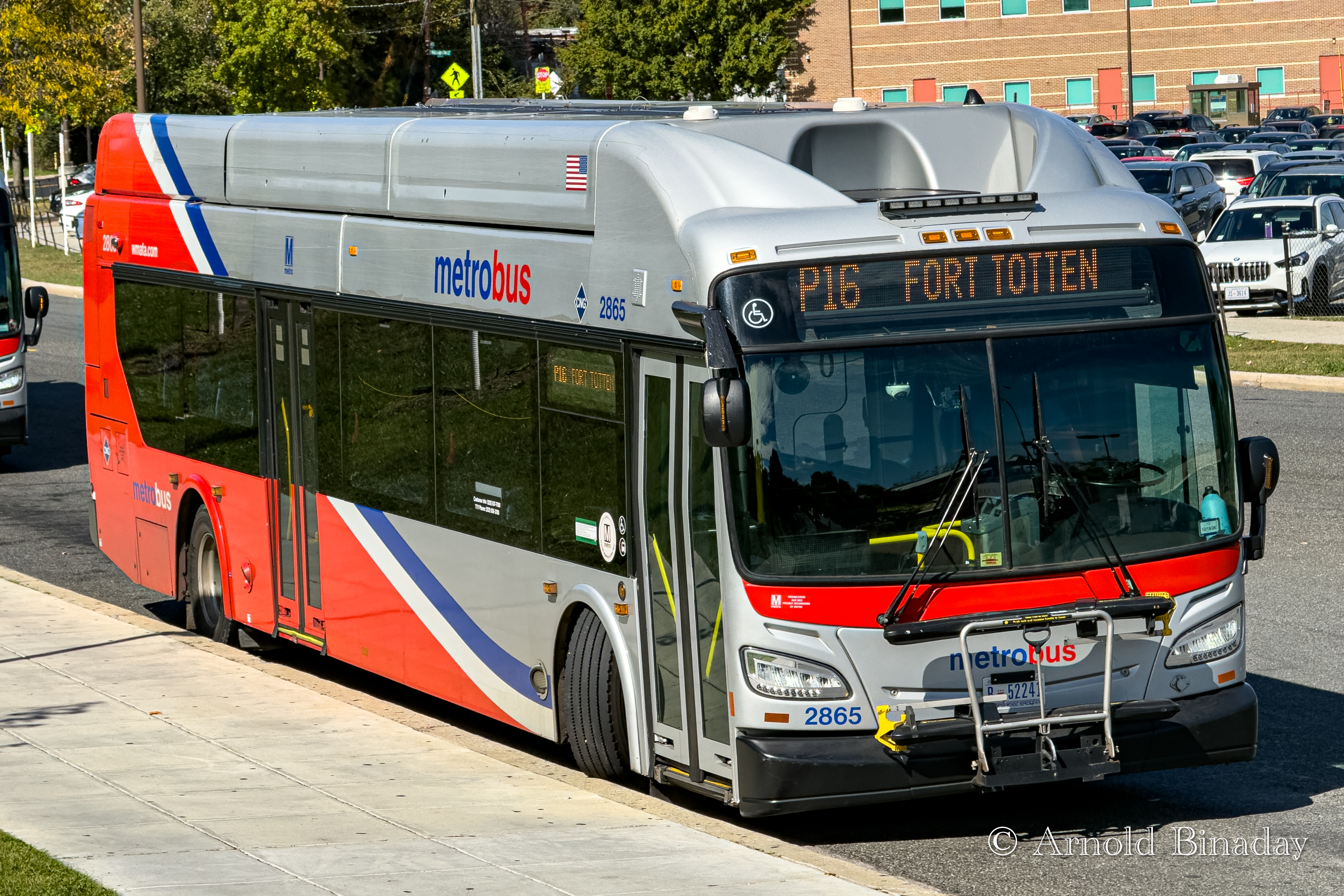
- Route P16 at Fort Totten station in October 2025

Overview
- System: Metrobus
- Operator: Washington Metropolitan Area Transit Authority
- Garage: Bladensburg
- Livery: Local
- Status: In Service
- Began service: R1: 1993; R2: 1978; P15, P16: June 29, 2025
- Ended service: R8, R9: December 11, 1993; R5: June 17, 2012; R1, R2: June 29, 2025

Route
- Locale: Prince George's County, Montgomery County, Northeast
- Communities served: Calverton, Beltsville, Westfarm, Adelphi, Langley Park, Lewisdale, Hyattsville, Riggs Park, Fort Totten
- Landmarks served: White Oak Adventist Medical Center (P16), High Point High School (P16), Federal Research Center of Adelphi (P16), Presidential Park (P15), 23rd Avenue, Fort Totten station
- Start: P15: Adelphi; P16: White Oak Medical Center
- Via: Riggs Road
- End: Fort Totten station

Service
- Level: P15: Weekday Peak Hour Service Only; P16: Daily
- Frequency: 20-60 minutes
- Operates: 4:30 AM – 12:00 AM
- Ridership: 153,874 (R1, FY 2025); 1,004,062 (R2, FY 2025)
- Transfers: SmarTrip only
- Timetable: Riggs Road Line

The Riggs Road Line, designated as the Riggs Road–Adelphi Line on Route P15, and Riggs Road–White Oak Line on Route P16, are bus routes operated by the Washington Metropolitan Area Transit Authority between Fort Totten station of the Red, Green and Yellow Lines of the Washington Metro & Adelphi (P15) or White Oak Medical Center (P16). Routes P15 & P16 operate every 20 minutes during peak hours and route P16 operates every 20 minutes at other times on weekdays, and 30-60 minutes on the weekends. P15 trips are roughly 32 minutes long and P16 trips are roughly 55 minutes long.

== Background ==
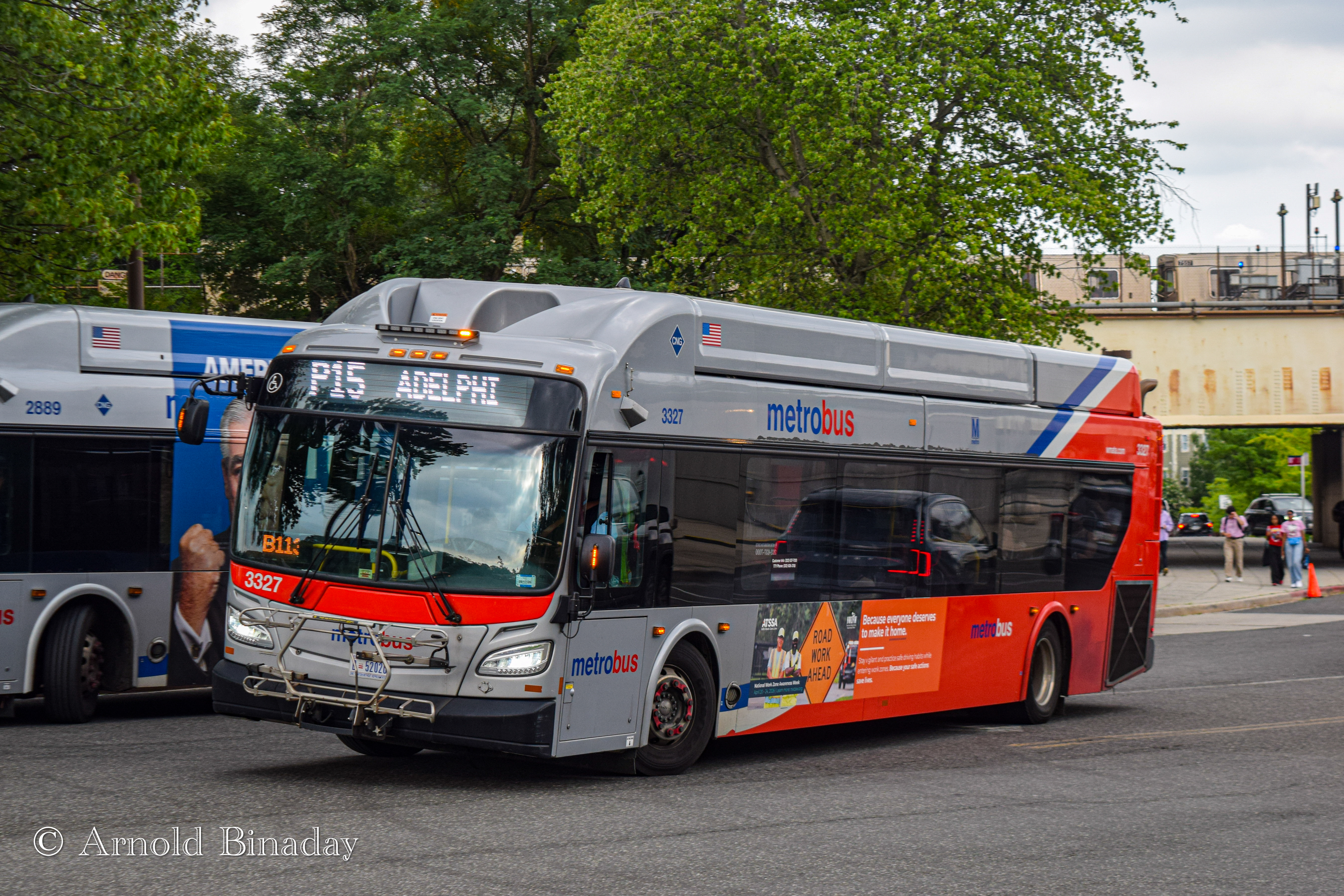
Route P15 at Fort Totten station

Routes P15 and P16 provide service along Riggs Road between Fort Totten station and Adelphi (P15) or White Oak Adventist Medical Center (P16). Route P15 operates in the weekday peak-hour direction only while route P16 operates daily. The line operates every 10-20 minutes during weekday peak hours, 20-30 minutes at all other times on weekdays, and 30-60 minutes on the weekends.

Routes P15 and P16 operate from Bladensburg division but had some trips operated by Northern division during peak hours until 2018. The line formerly utilized articulated buses due to its high ridership volume.

=== P15 stops ===
Bus stop	Direction	Connections
Northeast Washington, D.C.
Fort Totten station Bus Bay D	Northbound station, Southbound terminal	Metrobus: C71, C77, C81, D30, D44, M60, M6X, P16, P32, P35; Washington Metro:
Fort Totten station Bus Bay K	Northbound	Metrobus: C71, C77, C81, D30, D44, M60, M6X, P16, P32, P35; Washington Metro:
First Place NE / Riggs Road NE	Northbound	Metrobus: C71, C77, C81, D44, M60, P16
First Place NE / Ingraham Street NE	Southbound	Metrobus: C71, C77, C81, D44, M60, P16
Riggs Road NE / South Dakota Avenue NE	Bidirectional	Metrobus: C71, P16
Riggs Road NE / Chillum Place NE	Bidirectional	Metrobus: C71, M6X, P16
Riggs Road NE / Nicholson Street NE	Bidirectional	Metrobus: C71 (Northbound only), P16
Riggs Road NE / 6th Street NE	Southbound	Metrobus: P16
Prince George's County, Maryland
Riggs Road / Eastern Avenue	Bidirectional	Metrobus: P16
Riggs Road / Chillum Road	Bidirectional	Metrobus: P16, P42
Riggs Road / Sheridan Street	Bidirectional	Metrobus: P16
Riggs Road / Fairoak Avenue	Bidirectional	Metrobus: P16
Riggs Road / Ray Road	Bidirectional	Metrobus: P16
Riggs Road / Red Top Road	Southbound	Metrobus: P16, P35
Riggs Road / Sargent Road	Northbound	Metrobus: P16, P35
Riggs Road / Dayton Road	Bidirectional	Metrobus: P16, P35
Riggs Road / East-West Highway	Bidirectional	Metrobus: M12, P16, P30, P35
East-West Highway / 19th Place	Northbound	Metrobus: M12, P16, P30, P35
East-West Highway / Ager Road	Bidirectional	Metrobus: M12, P16, P30, P35
East-West Highway / 23rd Avenue	Southbound	Metrobus: M12, P16, P30, P35
23rd Avenue / Sheridan Street	Bidirectional	Metrobus: M12, P16, P30, P35; TheBus: P43
23rd Avenue / Woodberry Street	Northbound	Metrobus: P16; TheBus: P43
23rd Avenue / Amherst Street	Southbound	Metrobus: P16; TheBus: P43
23rd Avenue / Banning Place	Bidirectional	Metrobus: P16; TheBus: P43
23rd Avenue / Drexel Street	Bidirectional	Metrobus: P16; TheBus: P43
23rd Avenue / Fordham Street	Northbound	Metrobus: P16; TheBus: P43
23rd Avenue / Beechwood Street	Southbound	Metrobus: P16; TheBus: P43
23rd Avenue / Chapman Road	Northbound	Metrobus: P16; TheBus: P43
23rd Avenue / Hannon Street	Southbound	Metrobus: P16; TheBus: P43
23rd Avenue / Lewisdale Drive	Northbound	Metrobus: P16, P31; TheBus: P43
University Boulevard / 23rd Avenue	Southbound	Metrobus: P16, P31; TheBus: P43
University Boulevard / Guilford Road	Northbound	Metrobus: P16, P31; TheBus: P43
University Boulevard / Riggs Road	Bidirectional	Metrobus: M12, P16, P31; TheBus: P43; MTA: Purple Line (at Riggs Road station) (Planned)
Riggs Road / Jasmine Terrace	Bidirectional	Metrobus: P16
Riggs Road / Keokee Street	Bidirectional	Metrobus: P16
Riggs Road / Lebanon Street	Bidirectional	Metrobus: P16
Riggs Road / Merrimac Drive	Bidirectional	Metrobus: P16
Riggs Road / Cool Spring Road	Northbound	Metrobus: P16
Riggs Road / 20th Avenue	Southbound	Metrobus: P16
Riggs Road / Quebec Street	Bidirectional	Metrobus: P16
Riggs Road / Ruatan Street	Bidirectional	Metrobus: P16
Riggs Road / Saranac Street	Bidirectional	Metrobus: P16
Riggs Road / Apache Street	Bidirectional	Metrobus: P16
Metzerott Road / Greenspire Terrace Adelphi	Northbound (PM Peak); Southbound station (AM Peak)	Shuttle-UM
Metezrott Road / Presidential Towers	Bidirectional	Shuttle-UM
Metezrott Road / New Hampshire Avenue	Bidirectional	Shuttle-UM
New Hampshire Avenue / Northampton Drive	Bidirectional	Metrobus: M60, M6X; Ride On: 20, 24; TheBus: P37
New Hampshire Avenue / Adelphi Road	Bidirectional	Metrobus: M60; Ride On: 20, 24; TheBus: P37; Shuttle-UM
Adelphi Road / Sierra Street	Bidirectional	TheBus: P37
Adelphi Road / 19th Avenue	Bidirectional	TheBus: P37
Adelphi Road / Fox Street	Bidirectional	TheBus: P37
Adelphi Road / Erie Street	Bidirectional	TheBus: P37
Adelphi Road / Edwards Way	Bidirectional	TheBus: P37
Edwards Way / Riggs Road	Bidirectional	Metrobus: P16
Riggs Road / Edwards Way Adelphi	Northbound terminal (PM Peak); Southbound station (AM Peak)	Metrobus: P16

=== P16 stops ===
Bus stop	Direction	Connections
Northeast Washington, D.C.
Fort Totten station Bus Bay D	Northbound station, Southbound terminal	Metrobus: C71, C77, C81, D30, D44, M60, M6X, P15, P32, P35; Washington Metro:
Fort Totten station Bus Bay K	Northbound	Metrobus: C71, C77, C81, D30, D44, M60, M6X, P15, P32, P35; Washington Metro:
First Place NE / Riggs Road NE	Northbound	Metrobus: C71, C77, C81, D44, M60, P15
First Place NE / Ingraham Street NE	Southbound	Metrobus: C71, C77, C81, D44, M60, P15
Riggs Road NE / South Dakota Avenue NE	Bidirectional	Metrobus: C71, P15
Riggs Road NE / Chillum Place NE	Bidirectional	Metrobus: C71, M6X, P15
Riggs Road NE / Nicholson Street NE	Bidirectional	Metrobus: C71 (Northbound only), P15
Riggs Road NE / 6th Street NE	Southbound	Metrobus: P15
Prince George's County, Maryland
Riggs Road / Eastern Avenue	Bidirectional	Metrobus: P15
Riggs Road / Chillum Road	Bidirectional	Metrobus: P15, P42
Riggs Road / Sheridan Street	Bidirectional	Metrobus: P15
Riggs Road / Fairoak Avenue	Bidirectional	Metrobus: P15
Riggs Road / Ray Road	Bidirectional	Metrobus: P15
Riggs Road / Red Top Road	Southbound	Metrobus: P15, P35
Riggs Road / Sargent Road	Northbound	Metrobus: P15, P35
Riggs Road / Dayton Road	Bidirectional	Metrobus: P15, P35
Riggs Road / East-West Highway	Bidirectional	Metrobus: M12, P15, P30, P35
East-West Highway / 19th Place	Northbound	Metrobus: M12, P15, P30, P35
East-West Highway / Ager Road	Bidirectional	Metrobus: M12, P15, P30, P35
East-West Highway / 23rd Avenue	Southbound	Metrobus: M12, P15, P30, P35
23rd Avenue / Sheridan Street	Bidirectional	Metrobus: M12, P15, P30, P35; TheBus: P43
23rd Avenue / Woodberry Street	Northbound	Metrobus: P15; TheBus: P43
23rd Avenue / Amherst Street	Southbound	Metrobus: P15; TheBus: P43
23rd Avenue / Banning Place	Bidirectional	Metrobus: P15; TheBus: P43
23rd Avenue / Drexel Street	Bidirectional	Metrobus: P15; TheBus: P43
23rd Avenue / Fordham Street	Northbound	Metrobus: P15; TheBus: P43
23rd Avenue / Beechwood Street	Southbound	Metrobus: P15; TheBus: P43
23rd Avenue / Chapman Road	Northbound	Metrobus: P15; TheBus: P43
23rd Avenue / Hannon Street	Southbound	Metrobus: P15; TheBus: P43
23rd Avenue / Lewisdale Drive	Northbound	Metrobus: P15, P31; TheBus: P43
University Boulevard / 23rd Avenue	Southbound	Metrobus: P15, P31; TheBus: P43
University Boulevard / Guilford Road	Northbound	Metrobus: P15, P31; TheBus: P43
University Boulevard / Riggs Road	Bidirectional	Metrobus: M12, P15, P31; TheBus: P43; MTA: Purple Line (at Riggs Road station) (Planned)
Riggs Road / Jasmine Terrace	Bidirectional	Metrobus: P15
Riggs Road / Keokee Street	Bidirectional	Metrobus: P15
Riggs Road / Lebanon Street	Bidirectional	Metrobus: P15
Riggs Road / Merrimac Drive	Bidirectional	Metrobus: P15
Riggs Road / Cool Spring Road	Northbound	Metrobus: P15
Riggs Road / 20th Avenue	Southbound	Metrobus: P15
Riggs Road / Quebec Street	Bidirectional	Metrobus: P15
Riggs Road / Ruatan Street	Bidirectional	Metrobus: P15
Riggs Road / Saranac Street	Bidirectional	Metrobus: P15
Riggs Road / Apache Street	Bidirectional	Metrobus: P15
Riggs Road / Edwards Way	Bidirectional	Metrobus: P15 (Southbound only)
Riggs Road / Adelphi Road	Bidirectional	TheBus: P37
Riggs Road / Hughes Road	Bidirectional	
Riggs Road / Buck Lodge Road	Bidirectional	
Riggs Road / Heatherwood Court	Bidirectional	
Riggs Road / Buck Lodge Terrace	Bidirectional	
Riggs Road / Cruze Place	Northbound	
Riggs Road / Lackawanna Street	Southbound	
Riggs Road / Mistletoe Place	Bidirectional	
Riggs Road / Towhee Avenue	Bidirectional	
Riggs Road / Mistletoe Place	Bidirectional	
Riggs Road / Wooded Way	Northbound	
Riggs Road / Forestdale Drive	Southbound	
Riggs Road / Glenmore Drive	Bidirectional	
Powder Mill Road / Floral Drive	Northbound	
Powder Mill Road / Pinewood Court	Bidirectional	
Powder Mill Road / #3210	Bidirectional	
Powder Mill Road / Boxer Road	Northbound	
Powder Mill Road / Pleasant Acres Drive	Southbound	
Powder Mill Road / Cherry Mill Drive	Southbound	
Powder Mill Road / Cherry Hill Road	Bidirectional	Metrobus: M42, M44
Powder Mill Road / Cherry Hill Road	Northbound	Metrobus: M44
Powder Mill Road / High Point High School	Bidirectional	Metrobus: M44
Powder Mill Road / Evans Trail	Northbound	Metrobus: M44
Powder Mill Road / Allview Drive	Southbound	Metrobus: M44
Beltsville Drive / Giant Garden Center	Bidirectional	
Calverton Boulevard / Beltsville Drive	Bidirectional	
Calverton Boulevard / #3808	Northbound	
Calverton Boulevard / Chapel View Drive	Bidirectional	
Calverton Boulevard / Fallston Avenue	Bidirectional	
Montgomery County, Maryland
Calverton Boulevard / Galway Drive	Bidirectional	Metrobus: M52
Calverton Boulevard / Craiglawn Road	Bidirectional	Metrobus: M52
Calverton Boulevard / Gracefield Road	Bidirectional	Metrobus: M52
Cherry Hill Road / Plum Orchard Drive	Southbound	Metrobus: M60
Broadbirch Drive / Cherry Hill Road	Northbound	Metrobus: M52, M60; Ride On: 27
Plum Orchard Drive / Broadbirch Drive	Northbound	Metrobus: M42, M44, M52, M60; Ride On: 27
Plum Orchard Drive / ReStore	Southbound	Metrobus: M42, M44, M60; Ride On: 27
Plum Orchard Drive / Adventist White Oak Medical Center	Northbound terminal, Southbound station	Metrobus: M42, M44, M60; Ride On: 27

== History ==
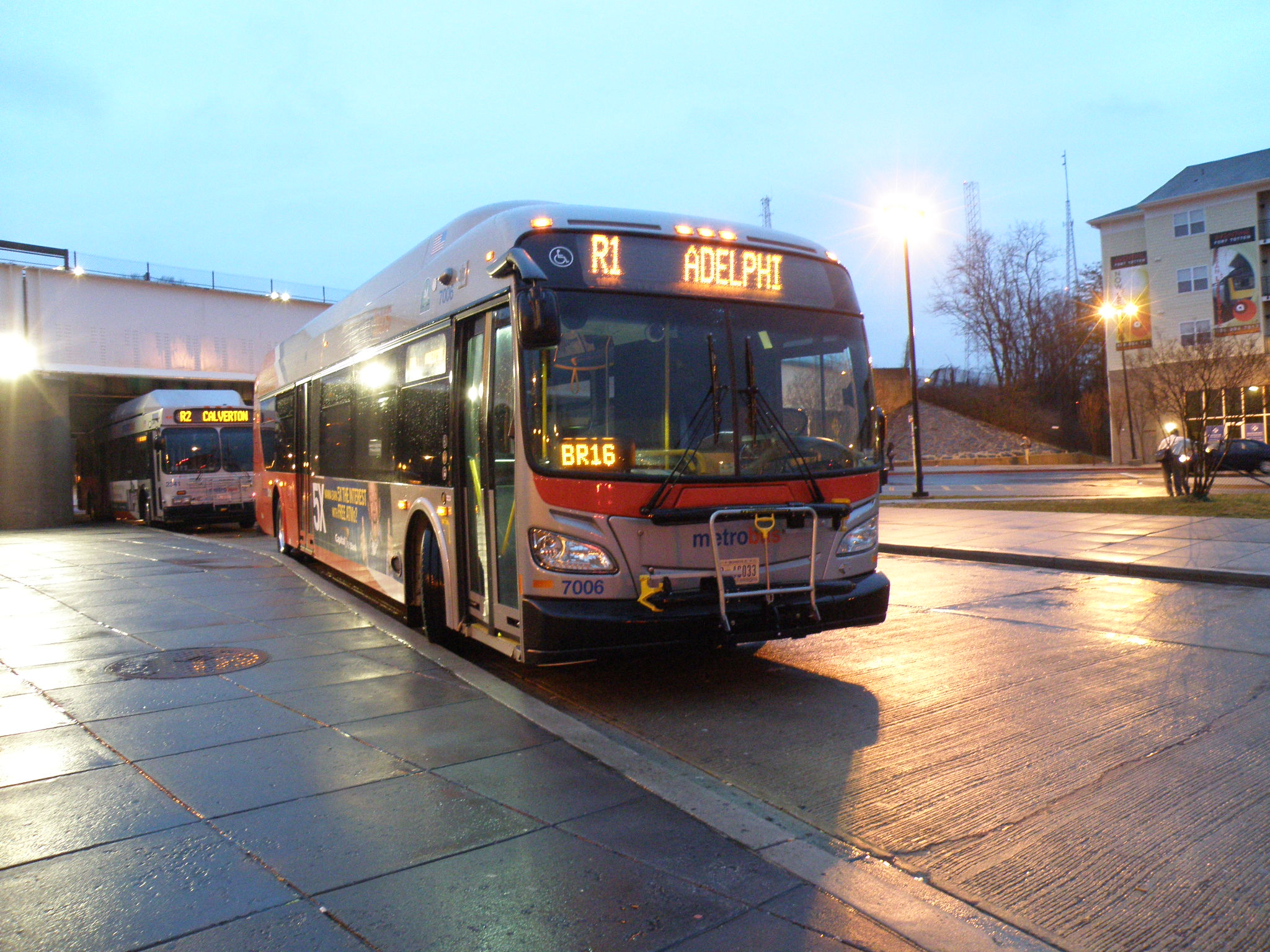
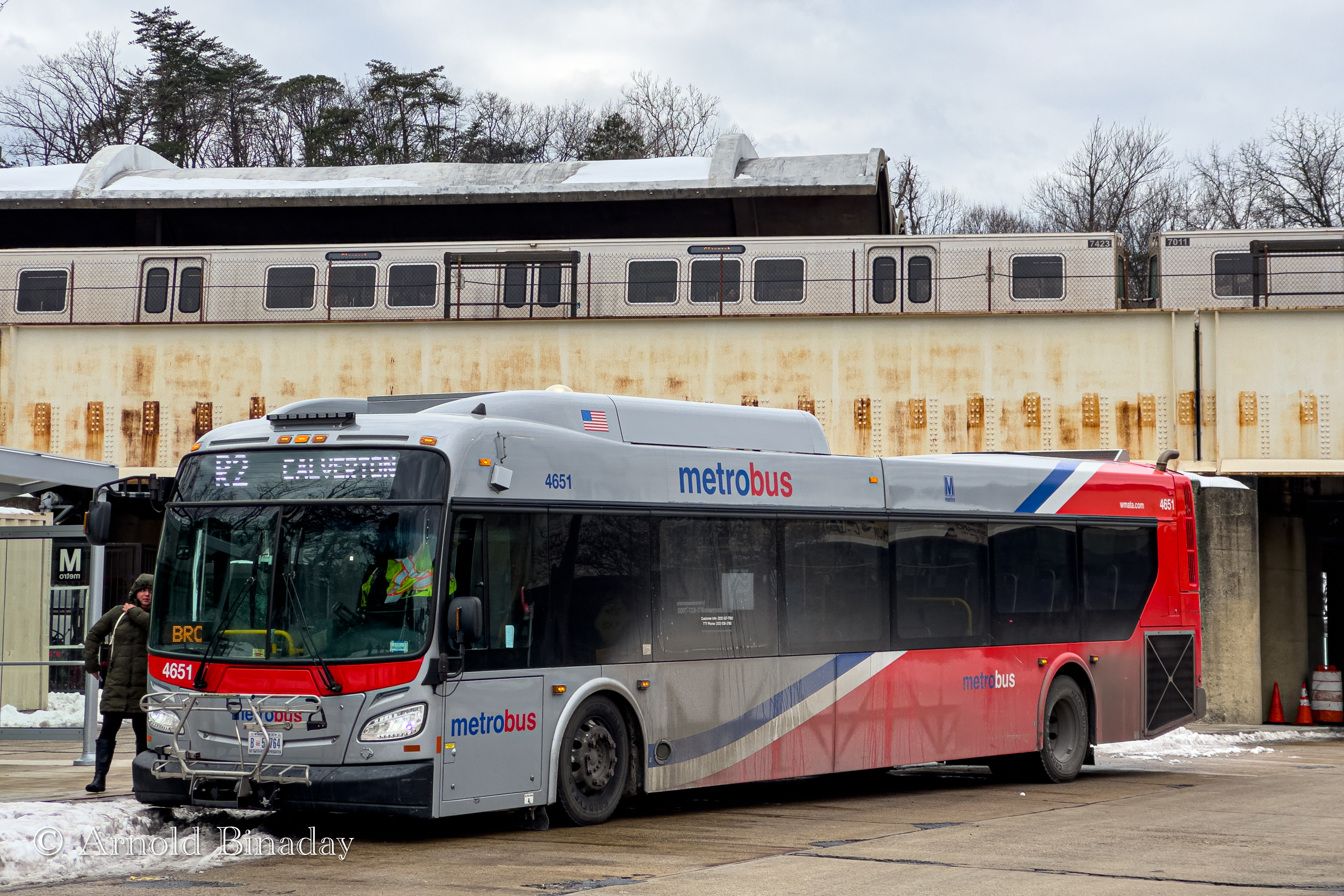
Former Routes R1 and R2 at Fort Totten station.

Before WMATA implemented the Better Bus Redesign network, Route P15 was previously known as Route R1, while Route P16 was previously known as Route R2. The Riggs Road Line was originally operated by routes R8 and R9 beginning in the 1970s running from Downtown DC to Calverton. Around the late 1970s, service to Downtown was discontinued and was replaced by the Red Line.

In 1975, the R2 was created as a new Metrobus Route to operate as part of the Calverton-Kennedy Center Line between the Kennedy Center and Great Oaks Center (Calverton), via F Street NW, New Hampshire Avenue NW, 19th Street NW (southbound), 18th Street NW (northbound), Connecticut Avenue NW, Columbia Road NW, Harvard Street NW (northbound), Mount Pleasant Street NW (northbound), Irving Street NW (eastbound), Park Place NW (southbound), Michigan Avenue NW/NE, Queens Chapel Road, Belcrest Road, the Prince George's Plaza Shopping Center, Toledo Road, Adelphi Road, Campus Drive, Baltimore Avenue, Rhode Island Avenue, Powder Mill Road, and Cherry Hill Road. On February 6, 1978, the R2 was rerouted to serve as part of the Queens Chapel Road Line running with routes R4, R6, and R7. Route R2 operated between the newly opened Brookland–CUA station and Centerpark Office Park in Calverton, via Queens Chapel Road, Belcrest Road, Prince George's Plaza, Baltimore Avenue, Rhode Island Avenue, and Powder Mill Road.

In 1975 the R4 was created as a new Metrobus Route to operate as part of the Crystal City-Calverton Line between Crystal City in Virginia and Great Oaks Center (Calverton), via the 14th Street bridges, Independence Avenue, 1st Street NE, Columbus Circle, Washington Union Station, Massachusetts Avenue NE, North Capitol Street NW, Riggs Road, Powder Mill Road, Beltsville Drive, Calverton Boulevard, and Cherry Hill Road.

Around the same time, route R8 along with the R4 would operate between Calverton and Crystal City station but would later be shortened to Fort Totten station. Route R5 would also operate between Fort McNair and Kennedy Center but would be later replaced.

On February 19, 1978, shortly after both Fort Totten station and Brookland–CUA stations opened, the R4 was rerouted to operate as part of the Queens Chapel Road Line between Brookland-CUA and Hyattsville. Once this change took place, the R8 replaced R4's routing on the Riggs Road Corridor, by operating between the Fort Totten station and Great Oaks Center (Calverton). In later years, the R9 would join the R8.

On December 11, 1993, Routes R8 and R9 were discontinued and replaced by the R2, originally a part of the Queens Chapel Road Line, which was rerouted to operate between Fort Totten station and Great Oaks Center (Calverton), via Prince George's Plaza station and Prince George's Plaza, and Riggs Road. Service to Brookland–CUA was replaced by the R4.

Also, new Routes R1 and R5 would join the R2. Route R1 would only operate between Fort Totten and Adelphi during the weekday peak hours, skipping the R2's diversion into Lewisdale and Prince George's Plaza and remaining on Riggs Road. The route would make a loop through Adelphi via Metzerott Road, New Hampshire Avenue, Adelphi Road, and Edwards Way, to reach its terminus at Edwards Way & Riggs Road (Adelphi). Route R5 would also operate during the weekday peak hours and would follow the R2's routing except the route would skip Prince George's Plaza.

Later around the 1990s, Route R7, which operated as part of the Queens Chapel Road Line alongside Routes R2, R4, and R6, was restored to operate as part of the Riggs Road Line between the Fort Totten station and Great Oaks Center (Calverton), via R2 and R5's routing but except it would divert into the United States Army Research Laboratory along Floral Drive. The R7 would also skip the R2's diversion to Prince George's Plaza.

In June 1996 when the Great Oaks Center closed, the R2, R5, and R7 Metrobus Routes were rerouted to terminate at the Orchard Shopping Center.

In 1998, route R7 was eliminated due to security concerns at the United States Army Research Laboratory. Service was replaced by route R2.

On May 15, 2003, the original bus bays inside Prince Georges Plaza Shopping Center, were demolished to build a new Target store. Route R2 along with routes 86, C4, F4, F6, F8, R3, R4 and TheBus 13, 14, 18 have stopped entering and looping inside around the mall. This change did not affect routes R1 or R5.

In 2010, a series of proposals were created for Routes R2 and R5 as part of WMATA's FY2011 and FY2012 budget. In the proposal, WMATA was to reroute route R2 into Lewisdale neighborhood along 23rd avenue and University Boulevard replacing route R3, which is proposed to be eliminated. Route R2 would also discontinue service to Prince George's Plaza station with alternative service provided by routes C4, F4, and TheBus 18. Route R5 would be discontinued and replaced by a more frequent R2 service. Route R1 would not be affected by the changes.

The proposal would be brought up again in 2011 sharing the same proposal idea from the 2010 proposed changes.

On June 17, 2012, Route R2 was changed to operate along 23rd Avenue, and University Boulevard before resuming its regular route along Riggs Road to serve the Lewisdale neighborhood, which replaced the R3 which was shortened to terminate at Prince George's Plaza. Service to Prince George's Plaza was discontinued and replaced by TheBus Route 18. Route R5 was also discontinued and replaced by additional R1 and R2 service.

On December 30, 2018, WMATA announced a proposal to make changes to the R2 routing.

One proposal was to extend the R2 beyond Calverton to Muirkirk station on the MARC Camden Line or to Greenbelt station discontinuing the Calverton loop.

The second proposal was to eliminate the segment of Route R2 service 23rd Avenue in Lewisdale and discontinue the R1 completely to create a more direct route for the R2 and to simplify the line. The discontinued segments in Lewisdale would be replaced by a rerouted route F8 and the already running TheBus route 18. Route F8 was proposed to make all stops on the proposed discontinued route R2 service in Lewisdale and discontinue service along Adelphi road. If the proposals are made, the R2 would provide a more direct route to Calverton or Fort Totten for customer convenience with the R1 being discontinued due to it being a duplication of the R2.

Other proposals mentioned that weren't considered were the following:

- Creating a new MetroExtra route for the Riggs Road Line.
- Moving either route R1 or R2 terminal to Prince George's Plaza (now Hyattsville Crossing) station with the other route remaining at Fort Totten station.
- Rerouting route R1 to Takoma Langley Crossroads Transit Center discontinuing service to Adelphi.
- Giving route R1 daily service but having route R2 be rerouted to Prince George's Plaza (now Hyattsville Crossing) station from Calverton.
- Swap route R1 and R2 routing in Lewisdale with R2 remaining on Riggs Road while R1 is rerouted along 23rd Avenue and University Boulevard.

None of the proposals went through due to public feedback.

During the COVID-19 pandemic, all route R1 service was suspended and route R2 was reduced to operate on its Saturday schedule beginning on March 16, 2020. However on March 18, 2020, route R2 was further reduced to operate on its Sunday schedule with weekend service suspended beginning on March 21, 2020. Route R1 was brought back to service on August 23, 2020 while route R2 resumed its regular schedule on the same day.

In 2024 during WMATA's FY2024 Budget crisis, WMATA proposed to eliminate all R1 service. However on April 25, 2024, Metro’s Board of Directors approved a $4.8 billion capital and operating budget which avoided service cuts.

=== Better Bus Redesign ===
In 2022, WMATA launched its Better Bus Redesign project, which aimed to redesign the entire Metrobus Network and is the first full redesign of the agency's bus network in its history.

In April 2023, WMATA launched its Draft Visionary Network. As part of the drafts, the Riggs Road Line was simplified into just the R2 and named Route MD244. The Calverton loop was replaced with a bidirectional routing along Calverton Boulevard. Service on Metzerott Road was replaced by the proposed Route MD246.

During WMATA's Revised Draft Visionary Network, WMATA renamed the MD244 into the P13 and changed to have both the R1 and R2 operate as a single route between Fort Totten and White Oak Medical Center via Adelphi. The route would follow the current R2 routing with the Calverton loop turning bidirectional along Calverton Boulevard, but would also loop around Adelphi via Metzerott Road, New Hampshire Avenue, and Adelphi Road on some trips. Every other weekday rush hour and Saturday trip before 8:00 pm would only operate between Fort Totten and the Adelphi Loop. Service operating to White Oak would skip the Adelphi Loop and remain on Riggs Road. The MD246 was also renamed to the P36 and kept its same routing. All changes were then proposed during WMATA's 2025 Proposed Network.

During the proposed 2025 Network changes, the P13 and P36 were dropped from the proposal and instead replaced by Routes P15 and P16. The P15 operates a similar routing to the R1, but was rerouted to follow the R2 and operate inside the Lewisdale Neighborhood via East-West Highway, 23rd Avenue, and University Boulevard before resuming its service to the Adelphi Loop. The P16 followed the R2 almost entirely, with the Calverton loop turning bidirectional along Calverton Boulevard, similar to the former P13 proposal.

On November 21, 2024, WMATA approved its Better Bus Redesign Network, with service on the Riggs Road Line being simplified.

Beginning on June 29, 2025, Route R1 was renamed to Route P15 and rerouted to serve the Lewisdale neighborhood, with the rest of the routing remaining the same. Route R2 was renamed to Route P16 and was rerouted to not serve Cherry Hill Road, and instead have bidirectional service along Calverton Boulevard.
