= Queens Chapel Road Line =

Bus route in Washington, D.C., United States

P33
- Queens Chapel Road Line

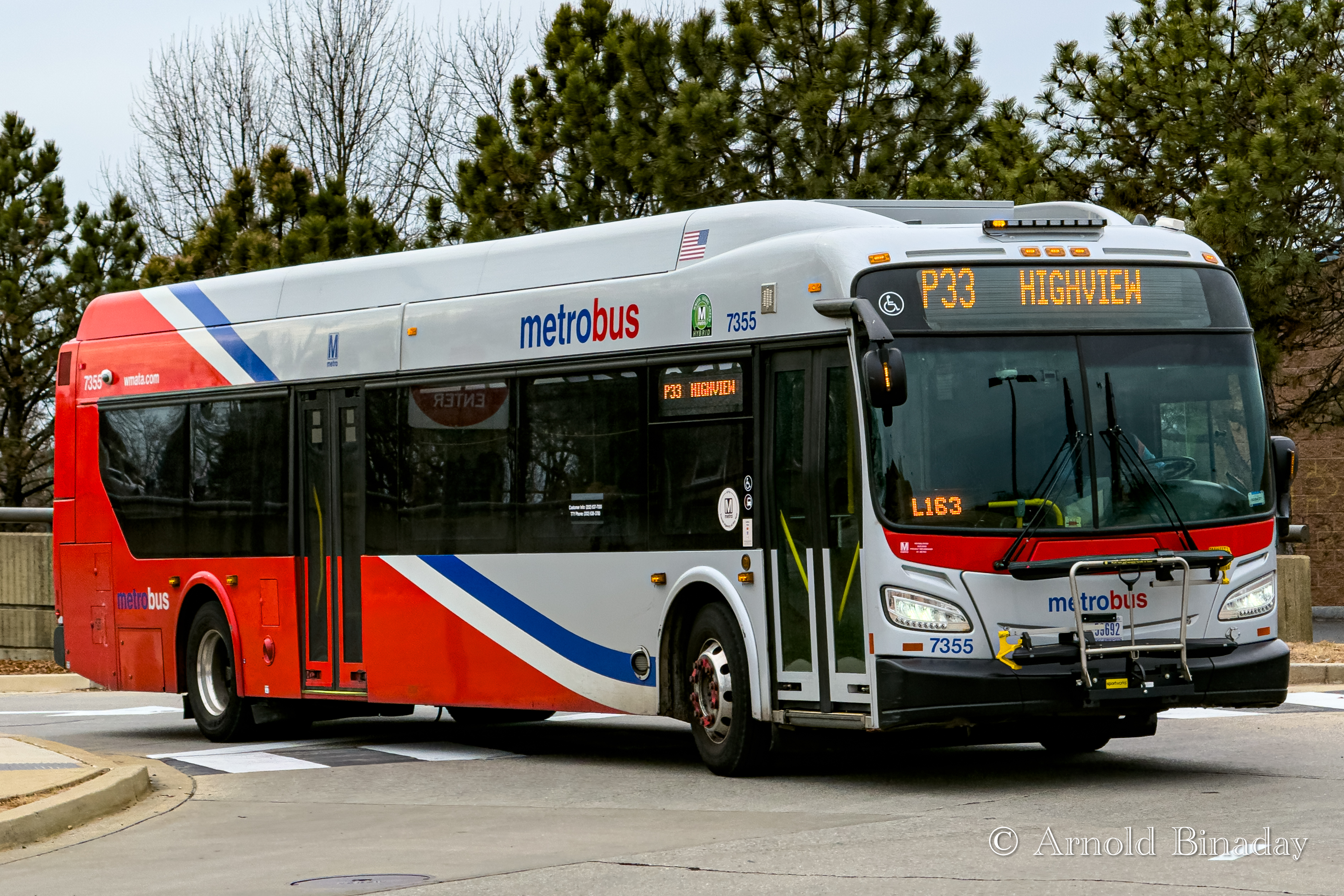
- Route P33 at Hyattsville Crossing station

Overview
- System: Metrobus
- Operator: Washington Metropolitan Area Transit Authority
- Garage: Landover
- Livery: Local
- Status: In Service
- Began service: 1978
- Ended service: R2, R6, R7: December 11, 1993; R4: June 29, 2025
- Predecessors: G7, G9, R2, R4, R6, R7

Route
- Locale: Prince George's County, Northeast
- Communities served: Brookland, University Heights, Michigan Park, Avondale, Mount Rainier, Hyattsville
- Landmarks served: The Mall at Prince George's, Hyattsville Crossing station, West Hyattsville station
- Start: Highview Apartments
- Via: Queens Chapel Road, Michigan Avenue NE
- End: Brookland station

Service
- Level: Daily
- Frequency: 20-35 minutes
- Weekend frequency: 40 minutes
- Operates: 5:00 AM – 11:19 PM
- Ridership: 391,211 (FY 2025)
- Transfers: SmarTrip only
- Timetable: Queens Chapel Road Line

The Queens Chapel Road Line, designated Route P33, is a daily bus route operated by the Washington Metropolitan Area Transit Authority between the Highview Apartment Complex in Hyattsville, Maryland and Brookland station of the Red Line of the Washington Metro. The line operates every 20–35 minutes during the weekdays and 40 minutes on the weekends. P33 trips are roughly 30 minutes long.

== Background ==
Route P33 operates daily between Brookland station and Highview, via Michigan Avenue NE, Queens Chapel Road, Ager Road, West Hyattsville station, Hamilton Street, Belcrest Road, Hyattsville Crossing station, East-West Highway, Belcrest Road, Toledo Terrace, Northwest Drive, Dean Drive, and Highview Terrace.

During light or moderate snowfall detours, route P33 would terminate at Hyattsville Crossing station with no service operating to Highview. The route would be suspended if heavy snowfall occurs.

Route P33 operates out of Landover division.

=== Route P33 stops ===
Bus stop	Direction	Connections
Northeast Washington, D.C.
Brookland station Bus Bay A	Northbound stop, Southbound terminal	Metrobus: C61, C63, D30, D34, D74; CUA Shuttle: Blue, Green; ACHS Shuttle: Brookland Metro; Metropolitan Branch Trail; Washington Metro:
10th Street NE / Michigan Avenue NE	Southbound	Metrobus: D74
Michigan Avenue NE / Perry Street NE	Bidirectional	Metrobus: D74
Michigan Avenue NE / Quincy Street NE	Bidirectional	
Michigan Avenue NE / 12th Street NE	Bidirectional	Metrobus: D30
Michigan Avenue NE / Shepherd Street NE	Bidirectional	
Michigan Avenue NE / Taylor Street NE	Northbound	
Michigan Avenue NE / Sargent Road NE	Southbound	
Michigan Avenue NE / 14th Street NE	Northbound	
Michigan Avenue NE / 16th Street NE	Southbound	Metrobus: C71
Michigan Avenue NE / South Dakota Avenue NE	Northbound	Metrobus: C71
Michigan Avenue NE / Bunker Hill Road NE	Bidirectional	
Michigan Avenue NE / Webster Street NE	Bidirectional	
Michigan Avenue NE / Queens Chapel Terrace NE	Bidirectional	Metrobus: D34, P42
Prince George's County, Maryland
Queens Chapel Road / 21st Street	Northbound	Metrobus: D34, P42
Queens Chapel Road / Carson Circle	Southbound	Metrobus: D34, P42
Queens Chapel Road / Russell Avenue	Bidirectional	Metrobus: D34
Queens Chapel Road / 24th Avenue	Bidirectional	Metrobus: D34
Queens Chapel Road / 25th Avenue	Northbound	Metrobus: D34
Queens Chapel Road / 29th Avenue	Southbound	Metrobus: D34
Queens Chapel Road / Buchanan Street	Bidirectional	Metrobus: D34
Queens Chapel Road / Chillum Road	Bidirectional	Metrobus: D34, P32
West Hyattsville station Bus Bay E	Bidirectional	Metrobus: C41, D34, P32; Washington Metro:
Ager Road / Hamilton Street	Bidirectional	Metrobus: C41, D34, P32
Hamilton Street / Ager Road	Northbound	Metrobus: C41, D34, P32
Hamilton Street / 31st Avenue	Bidirectional	Metrobus: C41; TheBus: P43
Queens Chapel Road / Hamilton Manor Drive	Southbound	Metrobus: C41; TheBus: P43
Queens Chapel Road / Jefferson Street	Northbound	Metrobus: C41; TheBus: P43
Queens Chapel Road / Lancer Drive	Bidirectional	TheBus: P43
Queens Chapel Road / Sacred Heart Home	Bidirectional	TheBus: P43
Queens Chapel Road / Nicholson Street	Bidirectional	TheBus: P43
Queens Chapel Road / Oliver Street	Bidirectional	TheBus: P43
Belcrest Road / Queens Chapel Road	Bidirectional	Metrobus: P10, P30, P35; TheBus: P43
Hyattsville Crossing station Bus Bays C and F	Bidirectional	Metrobus: M12, M44, P10, P30, P32, P35; TheBus: P43; Shuttle-UM: 113; Washington Metro:
Belcrest Road / #6505	Northbound	Metrobus: M12, M44, P10, P32; Shuttle-UM: 113
Belcrest Road / Freedom Way	Southbound	Metrobus: M12, M44, P10, P32; Shuttle-UM: 113
Belcrest Road / Toledo Road	Bidirectional	Metrobus: M12, P32; Shuttle-UM: 113
Toledo Terrace / Belcrest Road	Bidirectional	Metrobus: M12
Toledo Terrace / The Seville	Bidirectional	Metrobus: M12
Northwest Drive / Toledo Terrace	Bidirectional	
Dean Drive / Northwest Drive	Bidirectional	
Dean Drive / Highview Terrace	Bidirectional	
Highview Terrace / #6900	Bidirectional	
Highview Terrace / #7002 (Highview)	Northbound terminal, Southbound stop	

== History ==
=== Early history ===
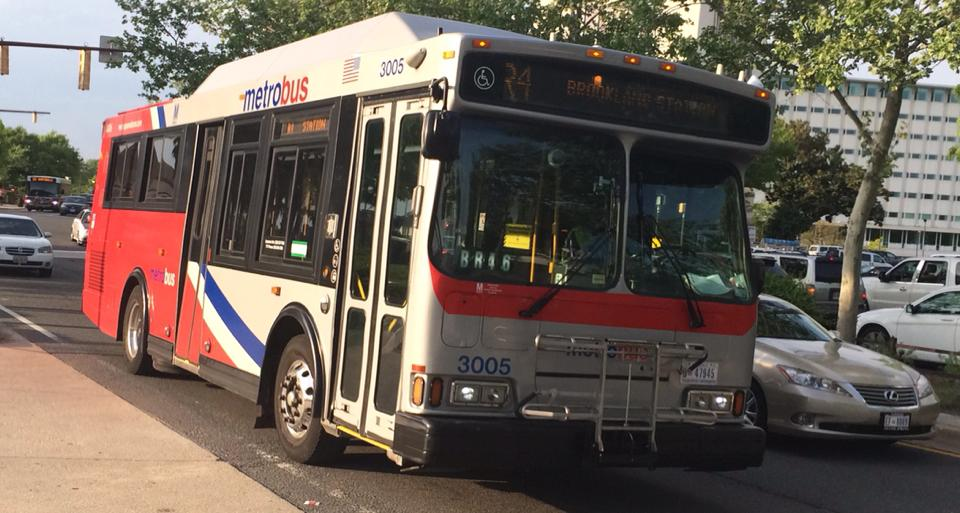
The R4 running to Brookland-CUA Station in 2014

Prior to WMATA's Better Bus Redesign network, Route P33 was previously known as Route R4. In 1962, the G7 and G9 was created under DC Transit to operate as part of the Prince George's Express Line. The G7 operated between Highview and Potomac Park, via Highview Terrace, Dean Drive, Northwest Drive, Toledo Terrace, Prince George's Plaza, Belcrest Road, Queens Chapel Road, Michigan Avenue NE, 4th Street NE, Lincoln Road NE, Rhode Island Avenue NE/NW (U.S. Route 1), 6th Street NW, Constitution Avenue NW, Virginia Avenue NW, and C Street NW. The G9 operated between Prince George's Plaza and Potomac Park, via the same routing as the G7. The G5 was eventually created as well to operate as part of the line between Highview and Potomac Park, following most of the same routing, with a diversion to the Bureau of Engraving headquarters before continuing to Potomac Park.

All three routes were eventually taken over by WMATA when they took over DC Transit and other bus companies operating across the DC Area and merged them all together to form its own Metrobus System. The G5, G7, and G9 routes were eventually discontinued on February 19, 1978 and replaced by Metrobus Routes R2, R4, R6, and R7, shortly after Brookland-CUA station opened.

=== Routes R2, R4, R6, R7 ===
In 1975, the R2 was created as a new Metrobus Route to operate as part of the Calverton-Kennedy Center Line between the Kennedy Center and Great Oaks Center (Calverton), via F Street NW, New Hampshire Avenue NW, 19th Street NW (southbound), 18th Street NW (northbound), Connecticut Avenue NW, Columbia Road NW, Harvard Street NW (northbound), Mount Pleasant Street NW (northbound), Irving Street NW (eastbound), Park Place NW (southbound), Michigan Avenue NW/NE, Queens Chapel Road, Belcrest Road, Prince George's Plaza, Toledo Road, Adelphi Road, Campus Drive, Baltimore Avenue, Rhode Island Avenue, Powder Mill Road, and Cherry Hill Road.

On February 19, 1978, all Routes were eliminated in Virginia as a result and each route was changed.

Route R2 was truncated to only operate between the Brookland–CUA station and Great Oaks Center (Calverton). Route H6 would replace R2's former routing between the Brookland-CUA station and Kennedy Center, during the times Metrorail service was available. However, the R2 would continue to make trips to the Kennedy Center when Metrorail was closed.

Route R4 was also rerouted to operate between Brookland–CUA station and Hyattsville, via the same routing as Route R2 between the Brookland-CUA station and intersection of Queens Chapel Road & Hamilton Street in Hyattsville, and then operate via the former route G4's loop in Hyattsville, via Hamilton Street, Gallatin Street, 42nd Avenue, Farragut Street, Baltimore Avenue, Gallatin Street, 42nd Avenue, Jefferson Street, 38th Avenue, and Hamilton Street.

Route R6 was rerouted to operate between Brookland–CUA station & Lewisdale, via the same routing as Route R2 between the Brookland-CUA station and the intersection of Queens Chapel Road & Ager Road in Hyattsville, and then divert off Queens Chapel Road onto the intersection of Ager Road, and then operate via the former Route E6's (Ager Road-Rhode Island Avenue Line) Lewisdale Loop, via 23rd Avenue, Lewisdale Drive, Fordham Street, and 23rd Avenue.

Route R7, was rerouted to operate between Brookland-CUA station and Highview. R7 would operate on the same routing as Route R2, between the Brookland–CUA station and Prince George's Plaza Shopping Center, and then operate via the former G5 and G7's routing via Belcrest Road, Northwest Drive, Dean Drive, and Highview Terrace.

=== Service Simplification ===
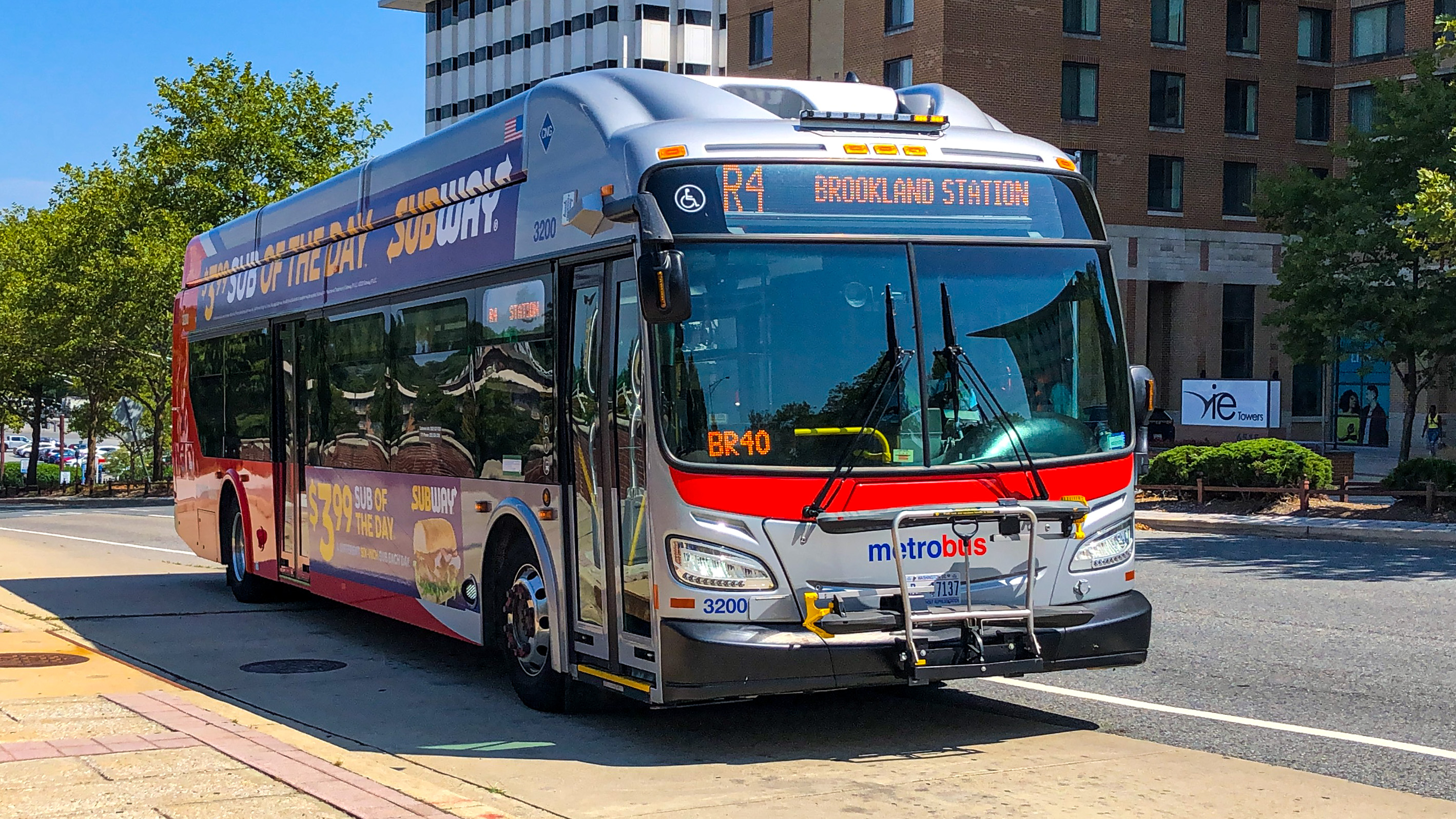
Route R4 at The Mall at Prince Georges in 2019.

On December 11, 1993, when West Hyattsville and Prince George's Plaza stations opened, the R2 was changed to operate to Fort Totten station and Calverton via Riggs Road, The Mall at Prince Georges, Prince George's Plaza, Powder Mill Road, Cherry Hill Road, and Calverton Boulevard as part of the Riggs Road Line, discontinuing service to Brookland-CUA and service along Queens Chapel Road, Belcrest Road, Toledo Road, Adelphi Road, University of Maryland, and Baltimore Avenue. Service to Calverton along Baltimore Avenue was replaced by Route 86 while service along Adelphi Road and to the University of Maryland was replaced by Routes F6 and F8.

Route R4 and R7 were combined into one route and renamed into the R4, operating on the R4 and R7 routing between Brookland-CUA station and Hyattsville, except the route would then divert off Queens Chapel Road to Ager Road, where it would serve West Hyattsville station. Then the route would operate along the R7 routing between Hyattsville and Highview via Queens Chapel Road, Belcrest Road, Prince George's Plaza station Prince George's Plaza Mall, Belcrest Road, Toledo Terrace, Northwest Drive, Dean Drive, and Highview Terrace.

As a result of the changes, Routes R6 and R7 were discontinued completely and replaced by Routes R3, and R4. The R6's segment in Lewisdale was taken over by the R3 while the R7 was covered completely by the R4. Service along Hamilton Street, 38th Avenue, and Jefferson Street was taken over by the F8 and the Hyattsville loop service via 42nd Avenue, Farragut Street, Baltimore Avenue, and Gallatin Street, was eventually replaced by Prince George's County TheBus Route 13 in 1996.

=== Later years ===
On May 15, 2003, the former Metrobus bus bays in front of the former G.C. Murphy store inside Prince George's Plaza, was demolished to build a new Target store. Route R4 stopped directing entering into and looping inside the Prince George's Plaza.

When the site where the new Mosaic Apartments are next to Prince George's Plaza station was being built, route R4 was rerouted to operate along East-West Highway and turn onto Belcrest Road, going to Highview from Prince George's Plaza station due to the construction. Southbound service to Brookland station was unaffected by the change.

During the COVID-19 pandemic, Route R4 was reduced to operate on its Saturday supplemental schedule beginning on March 16, 2020. However, on March 18, 2020, the route was further reduced to operate on its Sunday schedule and weekend service later suspended on March 21, 2020. A modified schedule and all weekend service resumed on August 23, 2020.

=== Better Bus Redesign ===
In 2022, WMATA launched its Better Bus Redesign project, which aimed to redesign the entire Metrobus Network and is the first full redesign of the agency's bus network in its history.

In April 2023, WMATA launched its Draft Visionary Network. As part of the drafts, WMATA proposed to shorten the R4 to Hyattsville Crossing station with service between Hyattsville Crossing station and Brookland–CUA station remaining unchanged. The line was named Route MD343 in the drafts. Service to Highview Apartments was combined with the Routes F1, F2, and F8, operating the F1 & F2 portion between Cheverly station and Prince George's Hospital via Arbor Street, Tuxedo Road, Kenilworth Avenue, Pepsi Place, and Hospital Drive, then a modified Route F8's routing between Prince George's Hospital and Hyattsville Crossing via Hospital Drive, Landover Road, Annapolis Road, Baltimore Avenue, Charles Armentrout Drive, Rhode Island Avenue, Jefferson Street, 42nd Avenue, and Queensbury Road. Then the route would operate on the R4's routing to Highview via East-West Highway, Toledo Terrace, Northwest Drive, Dean Drive, and Highview Terrace. The line was named Route MD344 in the proposals.

During WMATA's Revised Draft Visionary Network, WMATA renamed the proposed Route MD343 to Route P33, and was modified to operate along Belcrest Road, Toledo Terrace and East-West Highway before serving Hyattsville Crossing station. The proposed Route MD344 was also dropped in favor of TheBus Route P43. All changes were then proposed during WMATA's 2025 Proposed Network.

On November 21, 2024, WMATA approved its Better Bus Redesign Network.

Before the final network was released, WMATA made further changes to Route P33, with service being extended back to Highview Apartments due to customer complaints of losing direct access to bus service. The route would follow the current R4 entirely and would no longer skip Highview Apartments.

Beginning on June 29, 2025, Route R4 was renamed to Route P33, keeping its same routing.
