= 18th Street–Ivy City Line =

Washington D.C. bus route

C71
- 18th Street–Ivy City Line

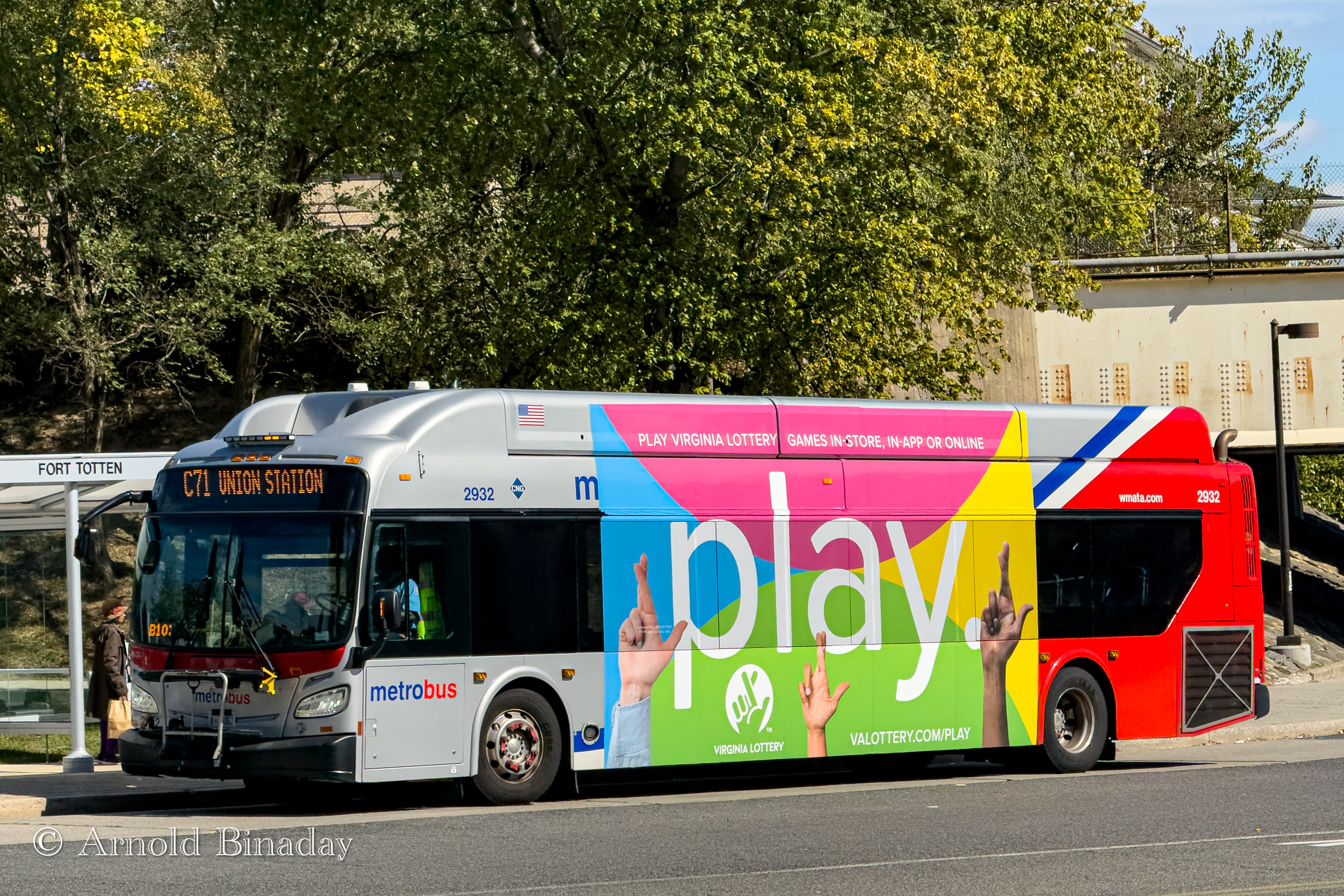
- Route C71 at Fort Totten Station

Overview
- System: Metrobus
- Operator: Washington Metropolitan Area Transit Authority
- Garage: Bladensburg
- Livery: Local
- Status: Active
- Began service: E2: 1970s C71: June 29, 2025
- Ended service: E2: June 29, 2025
- Predecessors: E2

Route
- Locale: Northeast
- Communities served: Fort Totten, Riggs Park, North Michigan Park, Woodridge, Brookland, Langdon, Ivy City, Trinidad, NoMa
- Landmarks served: Fort Totten station, Union Station, Washington Union Station
- Start: Fort Totten station
- Via: South Dakota Avenue NE, 18th Street NE, Trinidad / Montello Avenues NE, K Street NE
- End: Washington Union Station
- Length: 40 minutes

Service
- Level: Daily
- Frequency: 20-30 minutes (Weekdays); 30 minutes (Weekends)
- Operates: 5:55 AM - 12:00 AM
- Ridership: 339,970 (FY 2025)
- Transfers: SmarTrip only
- Timetable: 18th Street–Ivy City Line

The 18th Street–Ivy City Line, designated Route C71, is a daily bus route operated by the Washington Metropolitan Area Transit Authority between Fort Totten station of the Red, Green and Yellow Lines of the Washington Metro and Washington Union Station. The line runs every 20–30 minutes during the weekdays and 30 minutes during the weekends. Trips take roughly 40 minutes to complete.

== Background ==
Route C71 operates daily between Fort Totten station and Washington Union Station connecting passengers along South Dakota Avenue NE, 18th Street NE and K Street NE. Route C71 operates out of Bladensburg division.

=== Former E2 stops ===
Bus stop	Direction	Connections
Washington, D.C.
Fort Totten station Bus Bay E	Southbound station, Northbound terminal	Metrobus: 60, 64, 80, E4, F6, K2, K6, K9, R1, R2; Washington Metro:
Galloway Street NE / 4th Street NE	Southbound	Metrobus: 80 (Southbound only), E4, (Eastbound only), F6 (Eastbound only)
Galloway Street NE / South Dakota Avenue NE	Bidirectional	Metrobus: 80, F6
Gallatin Street NE / South Dakota Avenue NE	Bidirectional	Metrobus: 80, F6
Gallatin Street NE / 10th Street NE	Southbound	Metrobus: F6
Gallatin Street NE / 8th Street NE	Northbound	Metrobus: F6
Gallatin Street NE / Sargent Road NE	Bidirectional	Metrobus: F6
Sargent Road NE / Farragut Place NE	Bidirectional	
Sargent Road NE / Emerson Street NE	Bidirectional	
Sargent Road NE / Crittenden Street NE	Bidirectional	
South Dakota Avenue NE / Allison Street NE	Bidirectional	
South Dakota Avenue NE / Webster Street NE	Bidirectional	
South Dakota Avenue NE / 16th Street NE	Southbound	Metrobus: R4
South Dakota Avenue NE / Michigan Avenue NE	Northbound	Metrobus: R4
South Dakota Avenue NE / Taylor Street NE	Bidirectional	
South Dakota Avenue NE / 18th Street NE	Bidirectional	
18th Street NE / Randolph Street NE	Bidirectional	
18th Street NE / Otis Place NE	Southbound	
18th Street NE / Perry Street NE	Northbound	
18th Street NE / Otis Street NE	Northbound	
18th Street NE / Monroe Street NE	Bidirectional	Metrobus: G8
18th Street NE / Lawrence Street NE	Bidirectional	
18th Street NE / Jackson Street NE	Bidirectional	
18th Street NE / Hamlin Street NE	Bidirectional	Metrobus: 83, 86, T14, T18
18th Street NE / Franklin Street NE	Bidirectional	Metrobus: H6
18th Street NE / Evarts Street NE	Bidirectional	
18th Street NE / Douglas Street NE	Bidirectional	
18th Street NE / Bryant Street NE	Northbound	
18th Street NE / Adams Street NE	Bidirectional	
West Virginia Avenue NE / Montana Avenue NE	Southbound	Metrobus: S41
West Virginia Avenue NE / 17th Street NE	Northbound	Metrobus: S41
West Virginia Avenue NE / 16th Street NE	Bidirectional	Metrobus: D4 (Westbound only)
West Virginia Avenue NE / 15th Street NE	Southbound	Metrobus: D4 (Westbound only)
West Virginia Avenue NE / Fenwick Street NE	Southbound	Metrobus: D4
Fenwick Street NE / Okie Street NE	Southbound	Metrobus: D4 (Eastbound only)
Okie Street NE / 16th Street NE Ivy City	Northbound station, Southbound terminal	Metrobus: D4

== History ==
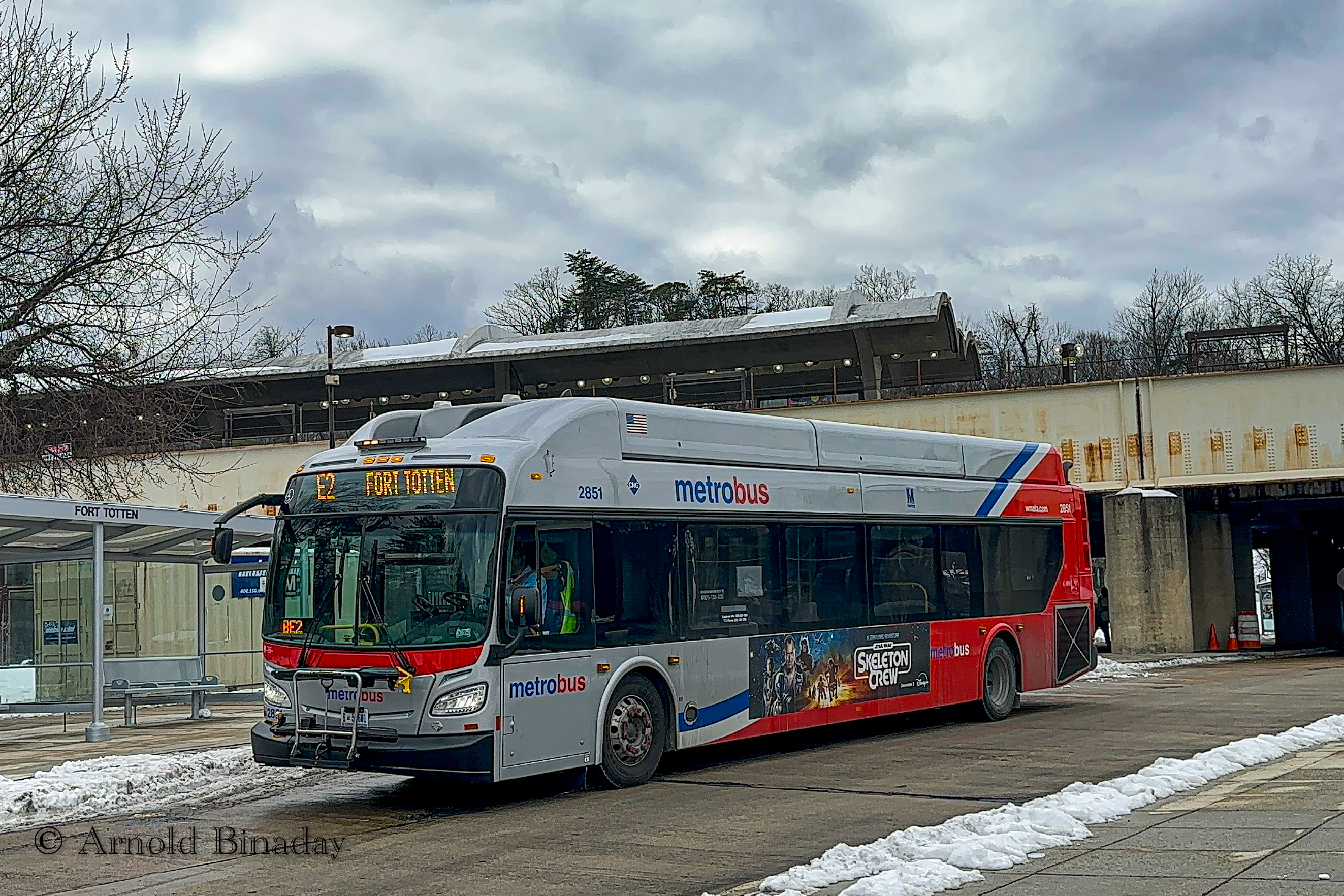
Former Route E2 at Fort Totten station

Route E2, E3, E4, E5, and E8 all operated as part of the Military Road–Crosstown Line through the years starting from Friendship Heights station. Route E4 originally operated up to University City Apartments in Lewisdale, Maryland but was shorten to Riggs Park in the 1970s. Routes E2, E3, and E4 terminated at Friendship Heights while E5 and E8 were shorten to Friendship Heights in 1984.

During the years, the E5 and E8 were discontinued and route E6 operated as part of the Chevy Chase Line. Prior to 2015, route E2 would operate between Friendship Heights station and Ivy City (Okie & 16th Streets NE), route E4 would operate between Friendship Heights and Riggs Park (Eastern Ave & Jamaica St NE) on weekdays only, and route E3 would operate on weekends only between Friendship Heights and Ivy City via Riggs Park as a combination to route E2 and E4. During the weekends as well, route E2 would operate between Friendship Heights and Fort Totten station only.

Beginning on September 24, 2006, route E3 midday service was eliminated and replaced by full route E2 and route E4. Route E4 and the full route E2 now operated during all days during the weekdays while the E3 only operated during the weekends. Route E2 kept its short trips between Friendship Heights and Fort Totten which only operated during times when the E3 operated.

In 2012, WMATA proposed to eliminate routes E3 and E4 and shorten route E2 between Friendship Heights station and Fort Totten station. Service between Fort Totten and Riggs Park/Ivy City would be replaced by an extended route D4 and F6 reroute. According to WMATA, this was to reduce running time and improve on-time performance, provide a level of service along the different portions of the line east and west of Fort Totten commensurate with the significantly different passenger demand on the two portions, and allow for a more even frequency of service on the western portion of the line where the greatest demand occurs.

In 2014, WMATA proposed to split the E2 and E4 into two separate routes. Route E2 will operate its current routing between Fort Totten station and Ivy City having the Friendship Heights station and Fort Totten section replaced by route E4 short trips. This will improve reliability of service on route E2 and E4 by operating shorter routes and create a better balance of capacity and demand throughout the line. WMATA will also have timed transfers at Fort Totten to minimize wait time.

On June 21, 2015, route E2 and E4 were split into two different bus lines. Route E2 was renamed into the Ivy City–Fort Totten Line and has the same routing between Fort Totten station and Ivy City while route E4 remained as the Military Road–Crosstown Line replacing route E2 between Friendship Heights station and Fort Totten also adding weekend service. These changes also replaced route E3 entirely.

Route E2 will have frequencies between Ivy City and Fort Totten every 20–30 minutes during the weekdays, every 48 minutes on Saturdays, and every 60 minutes on Sundays.

During the COVID-19 pandemic, all route E2 service was reduced to operate on its Saturday schedule beginning on March 16, 2020. However beginning on March 18, 2020, route E2 was further reduced to operate on its Sunday schedule on March 18, 2020. All weekend service was also suspended on March 21, 2020. On June 28, 2020, route E2 service was reduced even further operating every 60 minutes only between 6:00 a.m. to 11:00 a.m. and 1:30 p.m. to 6:30 p.m. during the weekdays only. On August 23, 2020, additional service was added to the E2 but weekend service remained suspended.

On September 26, 2020, WMATA proposed to eliminate all route E2 weekend service and reduce the frequency during the weekdays due to low federal funding in response to the COVID-19 pandemic. Later in February 2021 during WMATA's FY2022 budget crisis, WMATA proposed to restore weekend service, but would keep the E2 at reduced weekday frequencies from its August 2020 changes. On March 14, 2021, route E2 weekend service was restored.

On June 10, 2021, WMATA proposed to restore Route E2's pre-pandemic service as part of WMATA's Pandemic Recovery Plan. Full pre-pandemic service was restored on September 5, 2021.

Due to rising cases of the COVID-19 Omicron variant, the line was reduced to its Saturday service on weekdays. Full weekday service resumed on February 7, 2022.

In 2024 during WMATA's FY2024 Budget crisis, WMATA proposed to eliminate all E2 service. However on April 25, 2024, Metro’s Board of Directors approved a $4.8 billion capital and operating budget which avoided service cuts.

=== Better Bus Redesign ===
In 2022, WMATA launched its Better Bus Redesign project, which aimed to redesign the entire Metrobus Network and is the first full redesign of the agency's bus network in its history.

In April 2023, WMATA launched its Draft Visionary Network. As part of the drafts, WMATA proposed to extend the E2 from Ivy City to Washington Union Station via West Virginia Avenue NE, Mount Olivet Road NE, Brentwood Parkway NE, 4th Street NE, 6th Street NE, and D Street NE. Service was also modified to no longer operate along Gallatin Street NE or Sargent Road NE, and instead remain along South Dakota Avenue NE. The line was named Route DC208 in the drafts.

During WMATA's Revised Draft Visionary Network, WMATA renamed the DC208 to Route C71 and would still operate between Fort Totten station and Union station, but was changed to partially operate along the current D4 routing in Trinidad via Mount Olivet Road NE, Montello Avenue NE, Trinidad Avenue NE, Florida Avenue NE, and K Street NE, The line would then turn on North Capitol Street NW before terminating at Union station. All changes were then proposed during WMATA's 2025 Proposed Network.

During the proposals, Route C71 was changed again to operate through Riggs Park via 1st Place NE, Riggs Road NE, Chillum Place NE, Nicholson Street NE, Eastern Avenue NE, and Sargent Road NE, replacing the proposed P32 routing which was proposed to instead operate along Gallatin Street NE. On November 21, 2024, WMATA approved its Better Bus Redesign Network.

On November 21, 2024, WMATA approved its Better Bus Redesign Network.

Beginning on June 29, 2025, route E2 service was changed to operate via Riggs Park, mimicking the former E3 between Ivy City and Fort Totten, and being extended to Washington Union Station via Mount Olivet Road NE, Montello Avenue NE, Trinidad Avenue NE, Florida Avenue NE, and K Street NE, essentially partially combining the D4 in the process. The E2 was also renamed into the C71 with the line being named the 18th Street–Ivy City. The new C71 was essentially the same route WMATA proposed in 2012 during WMATA's FY2013 proposals.
