= Takoma–Fort Totten Line =

Bus route in Washington, D.C., United States

C77
- Takoma-Fort Totten Line

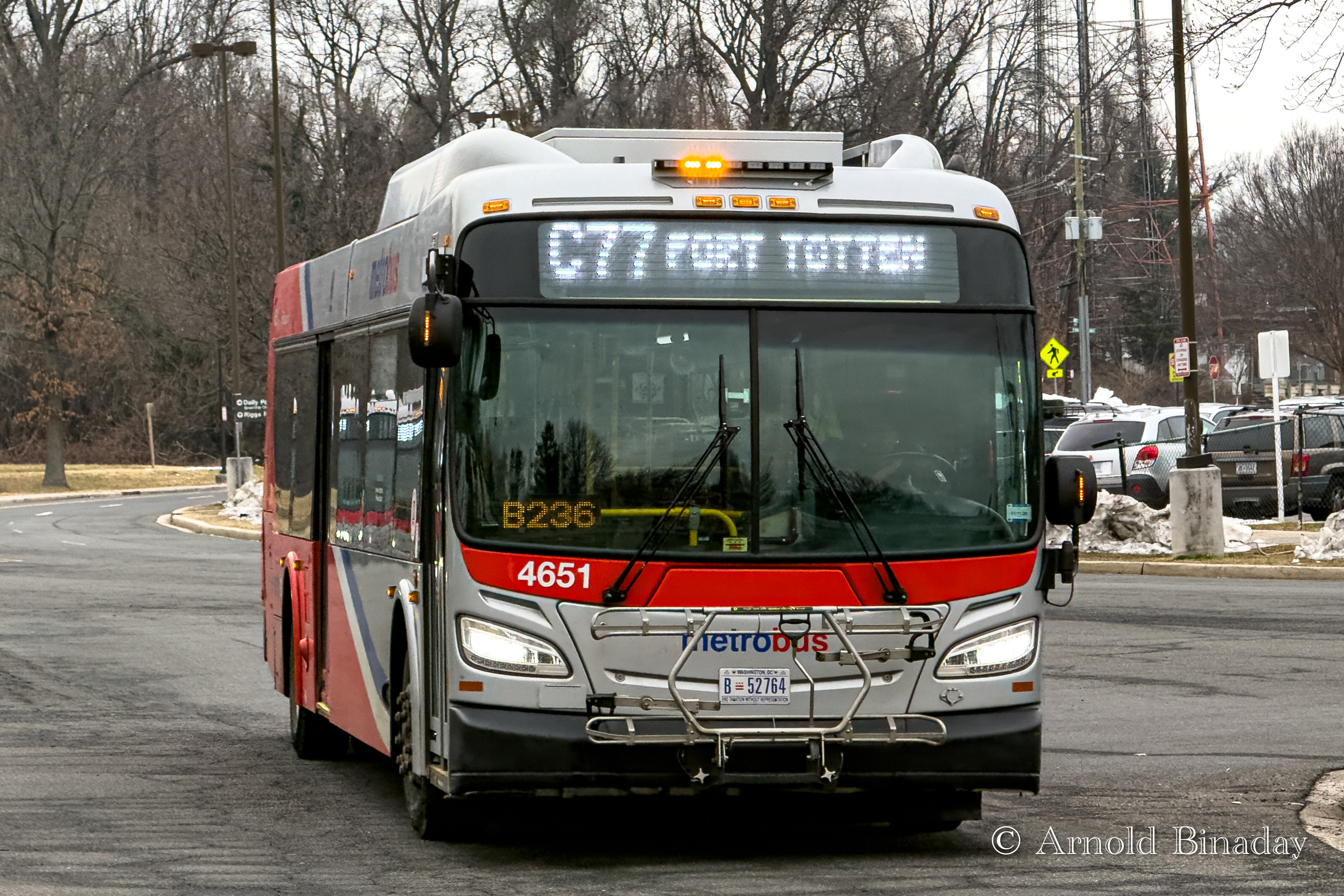
- Route C77 at Fort Totten station

Overview
- System: Metrobus
- Operator: Washington Metropolitan Area Transit Authority
- Garage: Bladensburg
- Livery: Local
- Status: In Service
- Began service: February 19, 1978
- Predecessors: K2

Route
- Locale: Northeast, Northwest
- Communities served: Fort Totten, Manor Park, Riggs Park, Takoma Park
- Landmarks served: Fort Totten station, Lamond, Takoma station
- Start: Fort Totten station
- Via: North Capitol Street, Kansas Avenue NE, Eastern Avenue
- End: Takoma station
- Length: 16 minutes

Service
- Frequency: 22 - 24 Minutes
- Operates: Weekday peak-hours only
- Ridership: 104,050 (FY 2025)
- Transfers: SmarTrip only
- Timetable: Takoma–Fort Totten Line

The Takoma–Fort Totten Line designated as Route C77 is a Metrobus Route operated by the Washington Metropolitan Area Transit Authority between the Fort Totten station of the Red, Green and Yellow Lines of the Washington Metro and Takoma station of the Red Line of the Washington Metro. The line operates every 22 - 24 minutes during weekday peak hours only with trips taking 15 minutes to complete.

== Background ==
Route C77 operates between Fort Totten and Takoma stations during weekday peak hours only in both directions. Additional C77 trips operates at 1:34 pm when public schools were open. The C77 connects Fort Totten and Takoma residents via Lamond without having to take the train during the peak-hours. Route C77 operates out of Bladensburg division but had operated out of Northern division at one point.

=== C77 stops ===
Bus stop	Direction	Connections
Northeast Washington, D.C.
Fort Totten station Bus Bay H	Northbound station, Southbound terminal	Metrobus: C71, C81, D30, D44, M60, M6X, P15, P16, P32, P35; Washington Metro:
Fort Totten station Bus Bay K	Northbound	Metrobus: C71, C81, D30, D44, M60, M6X, P15, P16, P32, P35; Washington Metro:
First Place NE / Riggs Road NE	Northbound	Metrobus: C71, C81, D44, P15, P16
First Place NE / Ingraham Street NE	Southbound	Metrobus: C71, C81, D44, P15, P16
Riggs Road NE / Blair Road NE	Northbound	Metrobus: C81, D44, M60
Riggs Road NE / Rock Creek Church Road NE	Southbound	Metrobus: C81, D44, M60
Riggs Road NE / North Capitol Street	Bidirectional	Metrobus: C81, D44, M60
North Capitol Street / Longfellow Street NW	Bidirectional	
North Capitol Street / Madison Street NW	Northbound	
Blair Road NW / Nicholson Street NW	Northbound	
Blair Road NW / Oglethorpe Street NW	Bidirectional	
Kansas Avenue NW / Blair Road NW	Northbound	
Kansas Avenue NW / Peabody Street NW	Southbound	
Kansas Avenue NW / Chillum Place NW	Southbound	
Kansas Avenue NE / Chillum Place NE	Northbound	
North Capitol Street / Sheridan Street NW	Southbound	
Kansas Avenue NE / Tuckerman Street NE	Northbound	
North Capitol Street / Tuckerman Street NW	Southbound	
North Capitol Street / Underwood Place NW	Southbound	
Kansas Avenue NE / Eastern Avenue	Northbound	Metrobus: P42
North Capitol Street / Eastern Avenue	Southbound	Metrobus: P42
Eastern Avenue / North Capitol Street	Northbound	Metrobus: P42
Eastern Avenue / Whitter Street NW	Southbound	Metrobus: P42 (Eastbound only)
Eastern Avenue / Walnut Avenue	Northbound	Metrobus: P42
Eastern Avenue / Walnut Street NW	Southbound	Metrobus: P42
Eastern Avenue / Laurel Avenue	Northbound	Metrobus: P42
Eastern Avenue / Laurel Street NW	Southbound	Metrobus: P42
Takoma station Bus Bay E	Northbound terminal, Southbound station	Metrobus: C75, D50, D5X, P42; Ride On: 12, 13, 14, 16, 18, 24, 25; Washington Metro:

== History ==
Before WMATA implemented the Better Bus Redesign network, Route C77 was previously known as Route K2. Route K2 was created as a brand new route by WMATA on February 19, 1978, to operate during the weekday peak-hours between the newly opened Fort Totten station and Takoma stations, plus to the Walter Reed Army Medical Center in the Shepherd Park neighborhood of Northwest Washington D.C. The new route will connect hospital workers to various to Metrorail stations without having to walk.

Route K2 will operate in a clockwise loop between Takoma and Walter Reed Army Medical Center during the AM peak-hours and a counter clockwise loop during the PM peak-hours and operate in both directions between Takoma and Fort Totten stations. Only hospital workers with a valid I.D. are allowed to ride inside the Walter Reed Army Medical Center. Passengers wishing to board/alight at the Medical Center would have had to get off at stops along Georgia Avenue. The route only operates between Fort Totten and Takoma stations during the peak hours in the non peak direction.

On March 27, 2005, the K2 was split into two routes. The K2 loop between the Takoma station and Walter Reed Army Medical Center was renamed under a route K1 under the Takoma–Walter Reed Line. The new K1 will operate during the weekday peak-hours only and operate under the clockwise and counter clockwise loops the K2 had plus had the same restrictions at the Walter Reed Army Medical Center loop.

Route K2 would only operate its routing between Takoma station and Fort Totten station during the weekday peak-hours only.

All K2 service was suspended beginning on March 16, 2020, due to the COVID-19 pandemic. Service resumed on August 23, 2020.

In February 2021 during WMATA's FY2022 budget crisis, WMATA proposed to eliminate all K2 service if they did not get any federal funding beginning in January 2022. Subsequently on April 22, 2021, WMATA approved the FY2022 budget and received federal funding to avoid service cuts.

Due to rising cases of the COVID-19 Omicron variant, Route K2 was temporarily suspended. Route K2 resumed service on February 7, 2022.

In 2024 during WMATA's FY2024 Budget crisis, WMATA proposed to eliminate all K2 service. However on April 25, 2024, Metro’s Board of Directors approved a $4.8 billion capital and operating budget which avoided service cuts.

=== Better Bus Redesign ===
In 2022, WMATA launched its Better Bus Redesign project, which aimed to redesign the entire Metrobus Network and is the first full redesign of the agency's bus network in its history.

In April 2023, WMATA launched its Draft Visionary Network. As part of the drafts, WMATA proposed to extend the K2 from Takoma station to Silver Spring station via Butternut Street NW, Aspen Street NW, 16th Street, Alaska Avenue NW, Eastern Avenue NW, and Colesville Road. The line was named Route DC301.

During WMATA's Revised Draft Visionary Network, WMATA renamed the DC301 to Route C69 and kept its same routing, which includes full weekday and weekend service. However prior to WMATA proposing its 2025 Proposed Network, the C69 was dropped from the proposals.

In an updated 2025 Proposed Network proposal, WMATA introduced a new Route C77, which is the same routing as the current K2, with the extension to Silver Spring station not included in the final proposal.

On November 21, 2024, WMATA approved its Better Bus Redesign Network.

Beginning on June 29, 2025, the K2 was renamed into the C77, keeping the same routing.
