= Brookland–CUA station =

Washington Metro station

Brookland–CUA
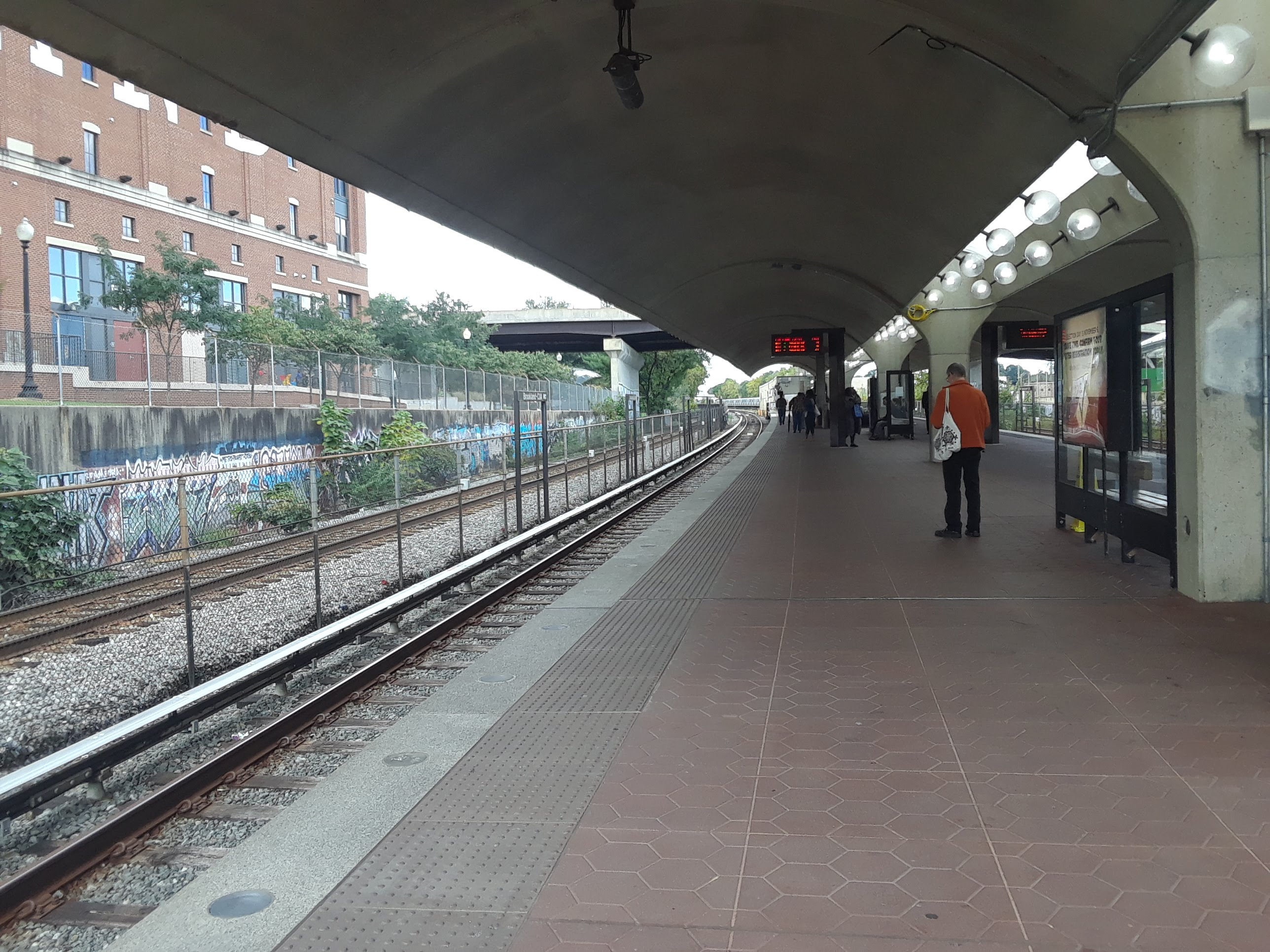
- The curve in the Brookland–CUA station platform in October 2018

General information
- Location: 801 Michigan Avenue NE; Washington, D.C.
- Coordinates: 38.933234°N 76.994544°W
- Owner: Washington Metropolitan Area Transit Authority
- Platforms: 1 island platform
- Tracks: 2
- Connections: Metrobus: C61, C63, D30, D34, D74, P33; CUA Shuttle: Blue, Green; ACHS Shuttle: Brookland Metro; Metropolitan Branch Trail

Construction
- Structure type: At-grade
- Parking: 27 metered spaces
- Cycle facilities: Capital Bikeshare, 10 racks, 16 lockers
- Accessible: Yes

Other information
- Station code: B05

History
- Opened: February 6, 1978; 48 years ago
- Former names: Brookland (1978–79)

Passengers
- 2025: 5,244 (average weekday)
- Rank: 28 of 98

Services
Preceding station	Washington Metro	Following station
Rhode Island Avenue toward Shady Grove	Red Line	Fort Totten toward Glenmont
Former services
Preceding station	Washington Metro	Following station
Rhode Island Avenue toward Farragut North	Green Line Commuter Shortcut	West Hyattsville toward Greenbelt
Route map
Location

Brookland–CUA station is a Washington Metro station in Washington, D.C., on the Red Line. Service began on February 6, 1978. The station serves the Brookland neighborhood and the Catholic University of America (CUA). It is the focal point of an upcoming transit-oriented development project.

== History ==
The station opened on February 3, 1978. Originally simply known as "Brookland," in 1979 its name was changed to "Brookland–CUA" due to the proximity of The Catholic University of America to the station.

In the summer of 2018 from July 21 to September 3, the station was shut down for platform repairs due to settling of the platform and decaying concrete caused by salty de-icer used in the winter.

=== Transit-oriented development ===
Brookland–CUA station is slated to be the center of a massive transport-oriented regeneration with the aim of increasing pedestrian-friendly development and an arts-focused neighborhood. The project includes a relocation of the station portals slightly to the south in a plaza with the western end of 9th, Newton, and Otis Streets which will be extended to the station plaza for more convenient access to the rest of the surrounding area.

In August 2014, Metro picked a joint venture involving MRP Realty and CAS Riegler LLC to begin the redevelopment of the 1.8 acres (7,300 m^{2}) site. The plan called for construction of 280 apartments and condominiums; 9,000 square feet (840 m^{2}) of ground-floor retail, 228 parking spaces, and the replacement of Metro's 38-space Kiss & Ride lot. Metro proposed a 98-year lease that included rent increases, and required the joint venture to seek approval of its plans from the District of Columbia Zoning Commission. At that time, Metro said ground would break on the redevelopment in 2016.

But in January 2015, the joint venture said it would take at least four years before it could complete its plans and obtain zoning commission approval, and that it would not be able to sign a lease until 2019.

== Station layout ==
The station has one slightly curved island platform. This curve requires mirrors to be placed on the westbound side of the platform to aid train operators in making sure the area is clear before closing the doors. Brookland–CUA also has a relatively uncommon layout; passengers entering the station first take escalators, stairs, or an elevator down to a lower level which includes the station's fare gates and ticket machines, before using escalators or elevators to go back up to reach the platform level; another example of this design is the Arlington Cemetery station. The station's elevator between the mezzanine and platform has a single faregate at the mezzanine level, similar to the Minnesota Avenue station.

Like Takoma, Fort Totten, and Silver Spring, Brookland–CUA is located in the middle of the CSX Metropolitan Subdivision rail line. There are two tracks to either side of the island platform, with Metro trains use the inner tracks and Amtrak and MARC Trains using the outer tracks.

== Notable places nearby ==
- Basilica of the National Shrine of the Immaculate Conception
- Saint John Paul II National Shrine
- Children's National Medical Center
- Mount St. Sepulchre Franciscan Monastery
- Providence Hospital
- Catholic University of America
- Archbishop Carroll High School
- Trinity Washington University
- Washington Hospital Center
