= New Hampshire Avenue Limited =

M6X
- New Hampshire Avenue Limited

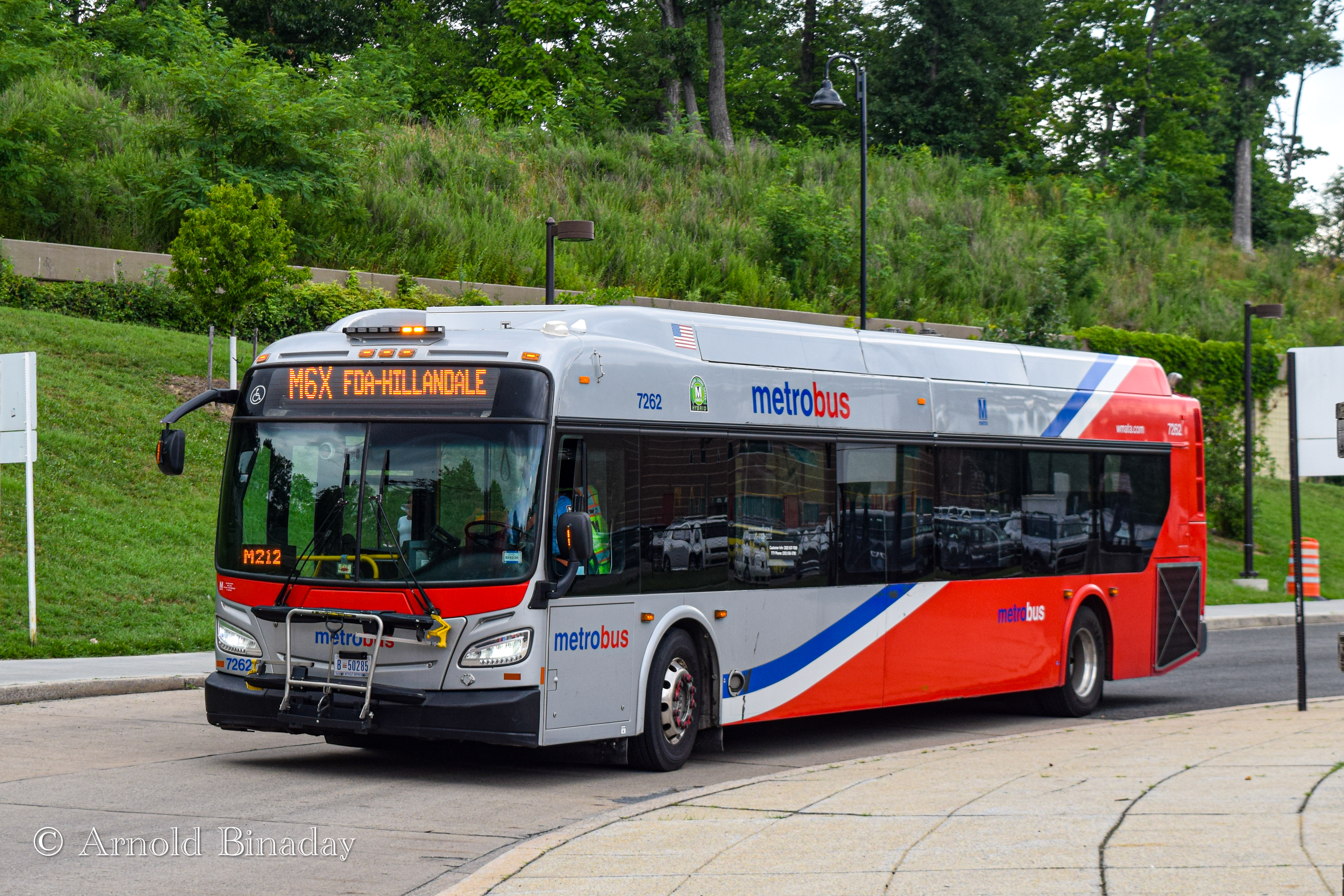
- Route M6X at Fort Totten station

Overview
- System: Metrobus
- Operator: Washington Metropolitan Area Transit Authority
- Garage: Montgomery
- Livery: MetroExtra
- Status: In Service
- Began service: December 30, 2012
- Predecessors: K9

Route
- Locale: Northeast, Prince George's County, Montgomery County
- Communities served: Fort Totten, Chillum, Langley Park, Adelphi, Takoma Park, Hillandale, White Oak
- Landmarks served: Federal Research Center / Food and Drug Administration, Northwest Park, Langley Park, Takoma Langley Crossroads Transit Center, Chillum, Fort Totten station
- Start: Fort Totten station
- Via: New Hampshire Avenue
- End: Food and Drug Administration
- Length: 30 - 35 minutes
- Other routes: M60 New Hampshire Avenue Local

Service
- Frequency: 15 minutes
- Operates: 5:21 AM - 9:00 AM; 3:20 PM - 6:50 PM
- Ridership: 252,926 (FY 2025)
- Transfers: SmarTrip only
- Timetable: New Hampshire Avenue Limited

The New Hampshire Avenue Limited, designated Route M6X, is a limited-stop Metrobus route operated by the Washington Metropolitan Area Transit Authority between the Fort Totten station of the Red, Green and Yellow Lines of the Washington Metro and the Food and Drug Administration in White Oak, Maryland. The line operates every 16–20 minutes during weekday peak-hours only. Route M6X trips are roughly 30 – 35 minutes.

== Background ==
Route M6X operates during the weekday peak-hours in both directions between Fort Totten station and the Food and Drug Administration. This route provides additional service for Route M60 during the weekday peak-hours which operates only 14 stops southbound and 11 stops northbound.

Route M6X operates out of Montgomery division. It originally operated out of Montgomery division until 2019 where it was transferred to Bladensburg division. On December 18, 2023, the route returned to Montgomery.

=== Stops ===
Bus stop	Direction	Connections
Northeast, Washington, D.C.
Fort Totten Station Bus Bay A	Southbound terminal, Northbound station	Metrobus: C71, C77, C81, D30, D44, M60, P15, P16, P32, P35; Washington Metro:
Riggs Road NE / Chillum Place NE	Bidirectional	Metrobus: C71, P15, P16
Eastern Avenue / Rittenhouse Street NE	Southbound	Metrobus: M60, P42
Prince George's County, Maryland
New Hampshire Avenue / Eastern Avenue	Northbound	Metrobus: M60, P42
New Hampshire Avenue / Popular Avenue	Southbound	Metrobus: M60
New Hampshire Avenue / Belford Place	Northbound	Metrobus: M60
New Hampshire Avenue / East-West Highway	Northbound	Metrobus: M60, P30; Ride On: 16
New Hampshire Avenue / Ethan Allen Avenue	Southbound	Metrobus: M60, P30; Ride On: 16
New Hampshire Avenue / East-West Highway	Northbound	Metrobus: M60, P30; Ride On: 16
Montgomery County, Maryland
New Hampshire Avenue / Erskine Street	Northbound	Metrobus: M60; Ride On: 16
New Hampshire Avenue / Glenside Drive	Southbound	Metrobus: M60; Ride On: 16
Prince George's County, Maryland
Takoma Langley Crossroads Transit Center Bus Bays A and G	Bidirectional	Metrobus: M12, M60, P31; Ride On: 15, 16, 17, 18, 25; TheBus: P43; Shuttle-UM: 129; MTA: Purple Line (Planned)
New Hampshire Avenue / Merrimac Drive	Bidirectional	Metrobus: M60, P31; Ride On: 16; TheBus: P43
New Hampshire Avenue / Northampton Drive	Bidirectional	Metrobus: M60; Ride On: 20, 24; TheBus: P37
Montgomery County, Maryland
New Hampshire Avenue / Powder Mill Road	Bidirectional	Metrobus: M60; Ride On: 10, 20, 22, 24
Mahan Road / New Hampshire Avenue	Bidirectional	
Mahan Road / Food and Drug Administration	Northbound terminal, Southbound station	Ride On: Flash BRT (Orange)

== History ==
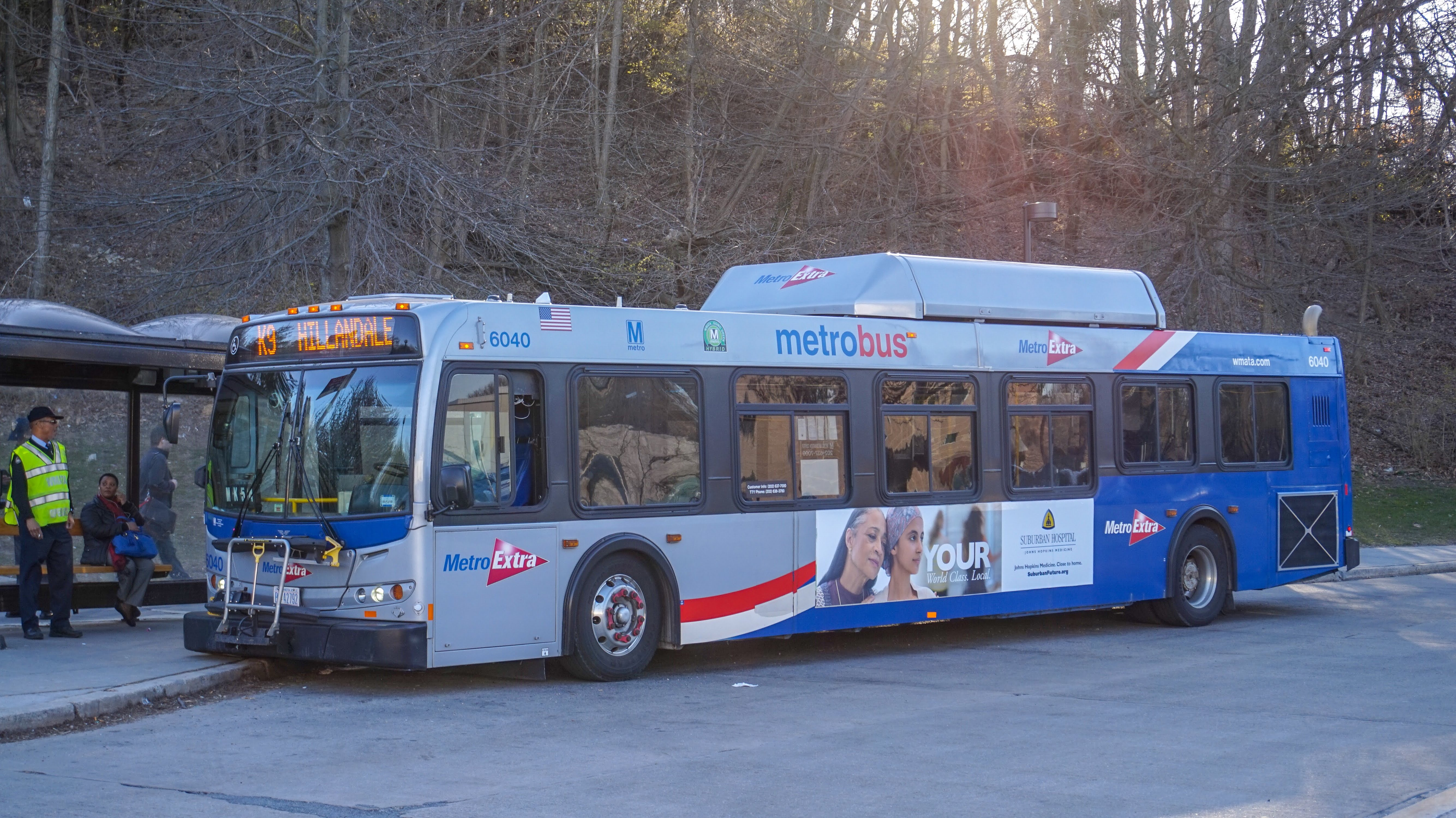
Former Route K9 at Fort Totten station in 2018

Prior to WMATA's Better Bus Redesign network, Route M6X was originally known as Route K9. Route K9 originally operated between Tamarack and Federal Triangle but was discontinued between the 1970s and 1980s.

Route K9 was reincarnated and introduced as a brand new MetroExtra route on December 30, 2012, at the request of Prince George's County, MD, Montgomery County, MD, and the City of Takoma Park, to operate as a limited stop route during weekday peak-hours, between Fort Totten station and Northwest Park Apartments, parallel to route K6 along the New Hampshire Avenue corridor. K9 was created to relieve overcrowding problems on the K6 during weekday peak-hours and provide a much faster ride between the Fort Totten and Northwest Park Apartments.

Route K9 was the first MetroExtra route introduced in Maryland since the J4 in 2002. The route would also become successful since its first day of service.

In 2013 during WMATA's FY2014 budget, WMATA proposed to extend route K9 to the White Oak Shopping Center and divert into the Food and Drug Administration building. WMATA also considered rerouting the K9 between New Hampshire Avenue & Eastern Avenue and Fort Totten station via Eastern Avenue and Riggs Road instead of via New Hampshire Avenue and North Capitol Street instead of operating alongside the K6.

On December 29, 2013, route K9 was extended north of its original terminus at Northwest Park Apartments, to the White Oak Food and Drug Administration building. K9 also no longer divert off of New Hampshire Avenue onto the intersections of Southampton Drive and Northampton Drive, and was to instead remain straight on New Hampshire Avenue and only serve the Northwest Park Apartments at adjacent Metrobus Stops along New Hampshire Avenue. Service was replaced by the K6 and Ride On.

When the Takoma Langley Crossroads Transit Center opened on December 22, 2016, the K9 was rerouted, along with several other Metrobus, Ride On buses, Shuttle UM and TheBus routes, to serve the newly opened Transit Center. Route K9 would serve Bus Bay A (Northbound) and Bus Bay G (Southbound) alongside the K6.

During WMATA's FY2021 budget year proposal, WMATA proposed to raise the MetroExtra fare from $2.00 to $3.00 at all times. However, WMATA also proposed to add weekday midday service to route K9.

All service was suspended beginning on March 16, 2020 due to the COVID-19 pandemic. On September 26, 2020, WMATA proposed to eliminate all route K9 service due to low federal funding. Route K9 has not operated since March 17, 2020 due to Metro's response to the COVID-19 pandemic. The elimination was also brought back up in February 2021 if WMATA does not get any federal funding. However the changes were avoided on March 10, 2021.

On September 5, 2021, WMATA restored the K9 to its original schedule, but in November 2021, WMATA announced they will temporarily suspend Route K9 once again beginning on December 26, 2021. On May 29, 2022, Route K9 service was once again restored.

In 2024 during WMATA's FY2024 Budget crisis, WMATA proposed to eliminate all K9 service. However on April 25, 2024, Metro’s Board of Directors approved a $4.8 billion capital and operating budget which avoided service cuts.

=== Long Term Proposals ===
Proposals that were mentioned towards the K9 are the following when both capital and operating funding is available:

- Extending the K9 to White Oak Transit Center to operate alongside route K6 and to revive crowding on the Z6 and Z8. This requires a capital investment in a new bus (about $750,000) as well as additional funds to pay for the operation and maintenance of the bus (about $150,000 annually).
- Add dedicated bus lanes, transit signal priority, signal re-timing, as well as new payment options, real-time bus arrival displays, and improved and fully accessible bus stops and shelters for the K9.

=== Better Bus Redesign ===
In 2022, WMATA launched its Better Bus Redesign project, which aimed to redesign the entire Metrobus Network and is the first full redesign of the agency's bus network in its history.

In April 2023, WMATA launched its Draft Visionary Network. As part of the drafts, WMATA proposed to extend the K9 to Colesville via New Hampshire Avenue as Route MD144. The route would combine the existing Route K9 and the current Route C8 and Z2 routing between the intersection of Manhan Road & New Hampshire Avenue, and the intersection of New Hampshire Avenue & Randolph Road. Service would operate alongside the proposed Route MD243 (Route K6) between the K6 routing between Fort Totten station and White Oak Medical Center via New Hampshire Avenue, Northwest Park, Columbia Pike, Tech Road, Broadbirch Drive, Cherry Hill Road, and Plum Orchard Drive.

During WMATA's Revised Draft Visionary Network, WMATA renamed the MD144 to Route M6X and converted it to a limited-stop express. The MD243 was renamed to Route M62. Both routes kept their same proposed routing. All changes were then proposed during WMATA's 2025 Proposed Network.

During the proposal, the M6X was cut back from Colesville to the Food and Drug Administration headquarters and ultimately became the current routing of Route K9, with service only operating during the weekday peak hours. Route M62 was also renamed to Route M60 and kept its proposed routing.

On November 21, 2024, WMATA approved its Better Bus Redesign Network.

Beginning on June 29, 2025, Route K9 was renamed to the M6X, and kept the same routing.
