= West Hyattsville station =

Washington Metro station

West Hyattsville
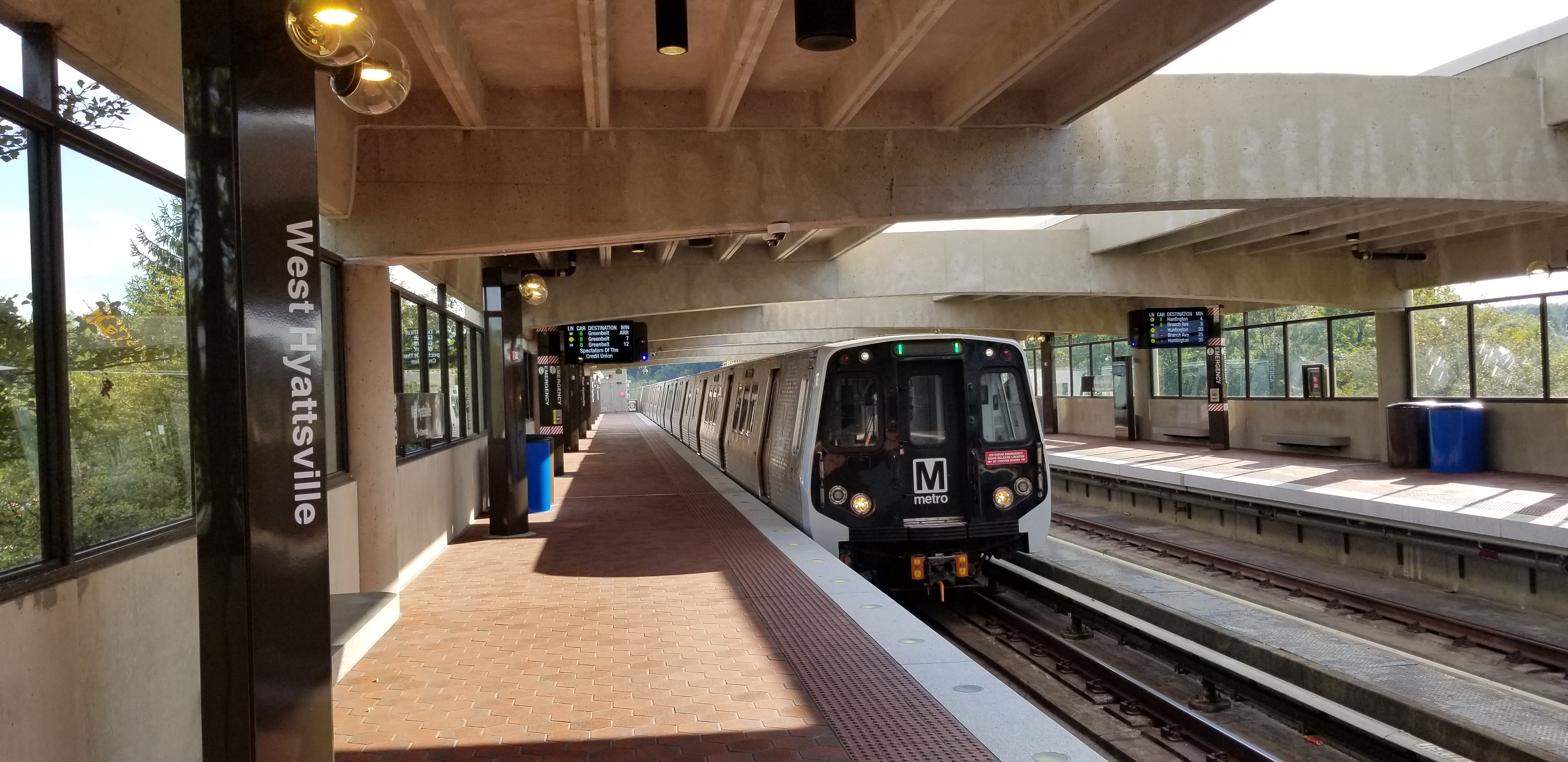
- Greenbelt-bound Green Line train at the station in 2021

General information
- Location: 2700 Hamilton Street; Hyattsville, Maryland
- Coordinates: 38.955031°N 76.969522°W
- Owner: Washington Metropolitan Area Transit Authority
- Platforms: 2 side platforms
- Tracks: 2
- Connections: Metrobus: C41, D34, P32, P33

Construction
- Structure type: Elevated
- Parking: 453 spaces
- Cycle facilities: Capital Bikeshare, 50 racks and 36 lockers
- Accessible: Yes

Other information
- Station code: E07

History
- Opened: December 11, 1993
- Rebuilt: 2021

Passengers
- 2025: 2,818 (average weekday)
- Rank: 63 of 98

Services
Preceding station	Washington Metro	Following station
Fort Totten toward Huntington	Yellow Line	Hyattsville Crossing toward Greenbelt
Fort Totten toward Branch Avenue	Green Line	Hyattsville Crossing toward Greenbelt
Former services
Preceding station	Washington Metro	Following station
Brookland-CUA toward Farragut North	Green Line Commuter Shortcut	Hyattsville Crossing toward Greenbelt
Route map
Location

West Hyattsville station is a Washington Metro station in Hyattsville, Maryland on the Green Line and Yellow Line. It is the first station in Prince George's County, Maryland northeast on the Green and Yellow Lines, and is located at 2700 Hamilton Street, near the west side of Ager Road and the north side of Queens Chapel Road.

== Station layout ==
The station is located west of the intersection with Queens Chapel Road and Ager Road. A parking lot, park and ride (formerly the site of the Queens Chapel Drive-In Theater and Mighty Mo Drive-In Restaurant, which closed during the late 1970's), and bus bays are located east of the station's side platforms. The red-brick Kirkwood Apartment Complex and Kirkwood Neighborhood Park can be seen on Ager Road, west of the station site. There used to be an abandoned red brick Palmer Ford Warehouse Building housed on the field right behind the West Hyattsville station, right next to the Kirkwood Apartment Complex. However; that site has been demolished around 2018 to make room for the construction of brand new luxury apartment complexes as part of gentrification taking place in the area. The West Hyattsville station also sits on the former Queens Chapel Municipal Airport Site, which was closed and demolished in 1955.

== History ==
The station was originally known as "Chillum" but was changed to "West Hyattsville" in 1979, well before services began on December 11, 1993.

The Yellow Line began serving West Hyattsville as of June 18, 2012 when the Metro Rush+ Initiative was introduced, which extended the Yellow Line from Fort Totten all the way up to Greenbelt, by way of the already existing Green Line Metrorail Train tracks, during weekday rush hour/peak period commuter times. The Yellow Line originally terminated at Mount Vernon Square but was later on extended to Fort Totten on December 31, 2006 as part of a 12-month experiment during off peak commuter times and weekends, at the suggestion of D.C. Councilmember, Jim Graham. Due to its success, this extension of the Yellow Line was made permanent around May, 2008. However; on June 25, 2017, Metro's Yellow Line trains stopped serving the West Hyattsville station due to the elimination of Rush+, which was part of major changes to the Metrorail system.

However; on May 20, 2019, Metro announced that Yellow Line trains will be re-extended from Mount Vernon Square and Fort Totten to Greenbelt at all service hours beginning May 25, 2019.

On May 7, 2023, the northeastern terminus of the Yellow Line was truncated from Greenbelt to Mount Vernon Square, following its reopening after a nearly eight-month-long major rehabilitation project on its bridge over the Potomac River and its tunnel leading into L'Enfant Plaza. From July 22 to September 4, 2023, the station was shut down to improve rail system technologies, including free shuttle bus services to closed stations north of Fort Totten. Half of Yellow Line service was re-extended to Greenbelt on December 31, 2025.
