= Lewisdale, Maryland =

Unincorporated community in Maryland, United States

Lewisdale
- Unincorporated community
- Location within the state of Maryland Lewisdale (the United States)
- Coordinates: 38°58′24″N 76°58′26″W
- Country: United States of America
- State: Maryland
- County: Prince George's
- Time zone: UTC-5 (Eastern (EST))
  - Summer (DST): UTC-4 (EDT)
- GNIS feature ID: 597680

Lewisdale is an unincorporated community in Prince George's County, Maryland, United States. For statistical purposes, it is considered part of the Chillum census-designated place (CDP). Lewisdale is a neighborhood contained between the Northwest Branch Anacostia River to the east, East West Highway to the south, University Boulevard to the north, and Riggs Road to the west.

== Neighborhood Character ==
The Lewisdale neighborhood generally consists of medium, one to two-story red-brick houses. Lewisdale neighborhood also includes two apartment complexes: the Newbury Square Apartment Complex and University City Apartment Complex.

== Education ==
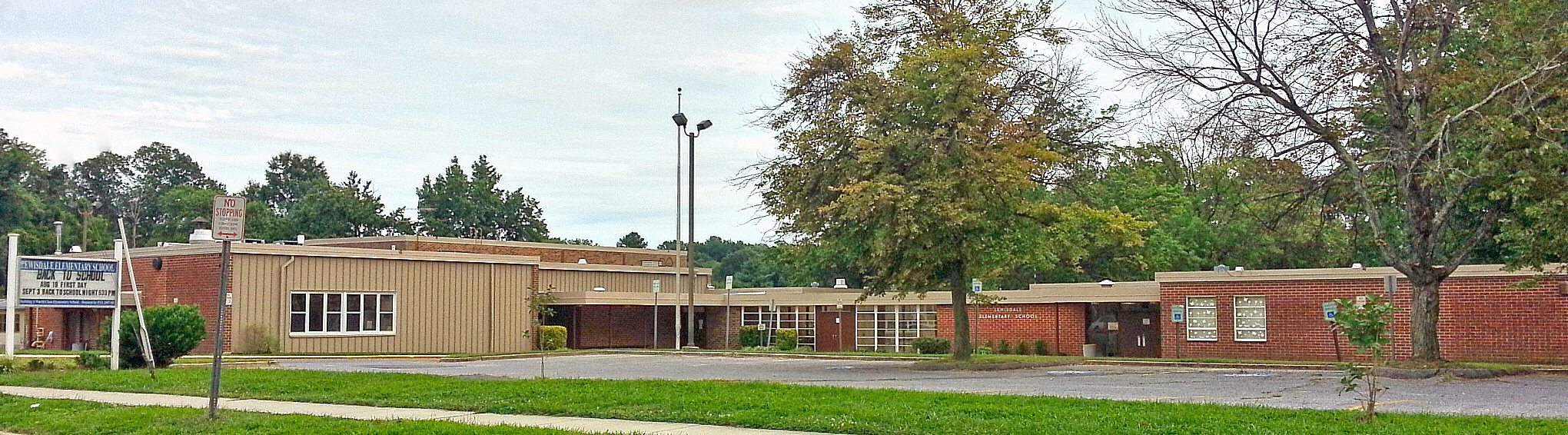
Lewisdale Elementary School

1. Lewisdale Elementary School (Grades Pre-K through 5)

== Parks and Recreation ==
1. Riggs Manor Neighborhood Park
  This park is located on the far southeast side of Lewisdale, where West Park Drive and Sheridan Street end. The Riggs Manor Neighborhood park is also bounded by the Northwest Branch Anacostia River to the east and East West Highway to the south. The Northwest Branch Trail, also notably, passes by this park. The Riggs Manor Park is a small, quiet park that consists of nothing more than a basketball court and bench.
2. Lewisdale Neighborhood Park
  This park is located slightly north of the Riggs Manor Neighborhood Park on West Park Drive. West Park Drive is interrupted by a small area of woods north of this park. West Park Drive continues north to University Boulevard after the woods ends at Banning Place. Similar to the Riggs Manor Park, the Lewisdale Neighborhood Park includes Northwest Branch Anacostia River to the east. The Northwest Branch Trail also passes by this park. The Lewisdale Neighborhood Park is also a quiet park, like the Riggs Manor Neighborhood Park, except the only difference, is that the park has a little more features. The Lewisdale Neighborhood Park features a small playground area and kickball field in addition to the basketball court it offers.
3. Lane Manor Community Park/ Recreation Center
  This park is located on the far north side of Lewisdale, at the intersection of University Boulevard and West Park Drive. Similarly to the Riggs Manor Neighborhood Park and Lewisdale Neighborhood Parks, the Lane Manor Community Park is surrounded by the Northwest Branch Anacostia River. Unlike the other two parks; however, this park is much more busy and full of a lot more action/ park facilities. The Lane Manor Community Park consists of a huge soccer field, a medium-sized playground area, a basketball court, tennis court, a small kickball field, a picnic/ pavilion area, an indoor recreational center facility with a bathroom, and a swimming pool with a small slide. Ice Cream Vending Trucks tend to frequently stop by this park in the spring and summer, since many children and adults buy ice cream at this park when the weather is hot. Additionally, the Lane Manor Community Park is a hot spot for soccer games. Many people play soccer games at this park for leisure, while others join soccer leagues that play competitive soccer games at this park.

== Historic sites ==
The following is a list of historic sites in Lewisdale identified by the Maryland-National Capital Park and Planning Commission:

	Site name	Image	Location	M-NCPPC Inventory Number	Comment
1	Green Hill		2009 Van Buren Street	65-008	Located in Lewisdale / West Hyattsville.
1	Green Hill Overseer’s House		6606 22nd Place	65-013	Located in Lewisdale
