= Friendship Heights–Southeast Line =

30N, 30S
- Friendship Heights–Southeast Line

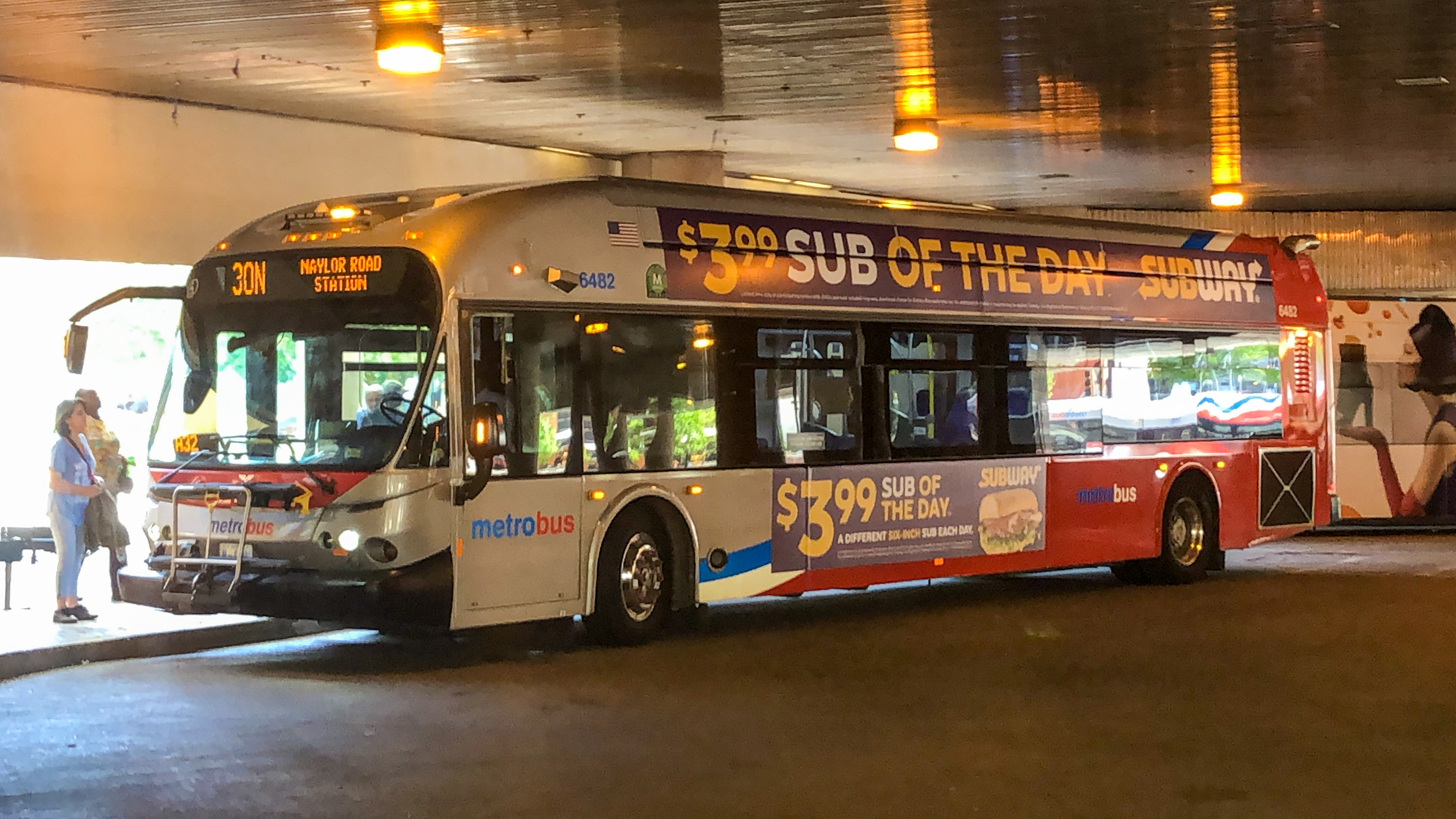
- A New Flyer DE40LFA operating the 30N at Friendship Heights

Overview
- System: Metrobus
- Operator: Washington Metropolitan Area Transit Authority
- Garage: Andrews Federal Center
- Livery: Local
- Status: Replaced by Routes 31, 32, 33, 36
- Began service: August 24, 2014
- Ended service: September 5, 2021
- Predecessors: 31, 32, 33, 36

Route
- Locale: Prince George's County, Southeast, Southwest, Northwest, Montgomery County
- Communities served: Bethesda, Friendship Heights, McLean Gardens, Georgetown, Tenleytown, Foggy Bottom, Federal Triangle, Capitol Hill, Barney Circle, Fairlawn, Good Hope, Naylor Gardens, Hillcrest
- Landmarks served: Friendship Heights station, Tenleytown–AU station, Washington National Cathedral, Georgetown, White House, Federal Triangle, Archives station, National Mall, U.S. Capitol, L’Enfant Square, Eastern Market station, Potomac Avenue station, Naylor & Good Hope Roads, SE (30S), Hillcrest (30N), Naylor Road station (30N), Southern Avenue station (30S)
- Start: Friendship Heights station
- Via: Wisconsin Ave, H Street NW (to Naylor Road/Southern Avenue) I Street NW (to Friendship Heights), Pennsylvania Avenue NW/SE, Naylor Road SE, Branch Avenue SE (30N), Alabama Avenue SE (30S)
- End: 30N: Naylor Road station 30S: Southern Avenue station

Service
- Level: Daily
- Frequency: 60 Minutes
- Operates: Weekdays Only
- Transfers: SmarTrip only
- Timetable: Friendship Heights–Southeast Line

The Friendship Heights–Southeast Line, designated as Routes 30N or 30S, is a defunct daily bus routes operated by the Washington Metropolitan Area Transit Authority between Friendship Heights station of the Red Line of the Washington Metro and Naylor Road station or Southern Avenue station of the Green Line of the Washington Metro. Both lines operated every 60 minutes at all times. Trips were roughly 90 minutes long. This line provided service from Friendship Heights, operating through most of NW and SE DC and ending in southern Prince George's County via a one bus ride. Extra services are provided by the 32, 34, and 36 in Southeast and 31 and 33 in Northwest.

WMATA ended the service on September 5, 2021, calling it redundant to Routes 31, 32, 33, and 36.

== Route ==
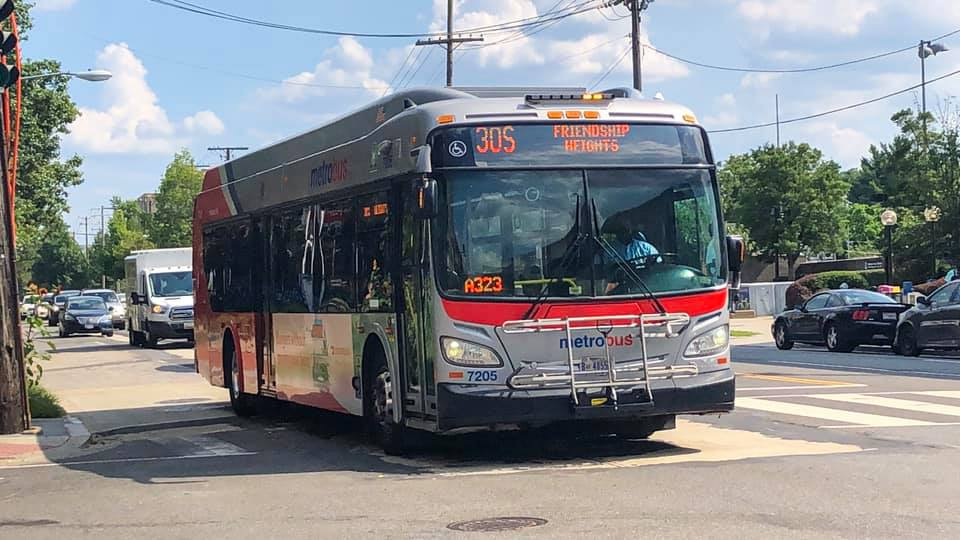
Route 30S along Wisconsin Avenue in the Friendship Heights neighborhood

Routes 30N and 30S operated every 60 minutes. Additional service was provided by the 31, 32, 33, 34, and 36 in Southeast and Northwest. Routes 30N and 30S was a combination of routes 31, 32, 33, 34, 36, 37, and 39 that forms one long route as Routes 31, 33, and 37 run the portion between Friendship Heights station and Potomac Park or Federal Triangle via Wisconsin Avenue and Routes 32, 34, 36, and 39 run from Potomac Park or Archives station to Southern Avenue station or Naylor Road station via Pennsylvania Avenue. It was the 32 and 36 routing before August 2014.

Routes 30N and 30S buses came from Andrews Federal Center division until June 23, 2019, when they began coming from Western division.

=== Route 30N stops ===
Bus stop	Direction	Connections
Bethesda, Maryland
Friendship Heights Bus Bay C	Eastbound stop, Westbound terminal	Metrobus: 30S, 31, 33, 37, E4, E6, L2, L8, N2, N4, N6, T2; Ride On: 1, 11, 23, 29, 34; Friendship Heights Village Bus; Washington Metro:
Washington, D.C.
Wisconsin Avenue NW / Jenifer Street NW	Bidirectional	Metrobus: 30S, 31, 33, N2
Wisconsin Avenue NW / Harrison Street NW	Bidirectional	Metrobus: 30S, 31, 33, N2
Wisconsin Avenue NW / Fessenden Street NW	Bidirectional	Metrobus: 30S, 31, 33, 37, N2
Wisconsin Avenue NW / Chesapeake Street NW	Bidirectional	Metrobus: 30S, 31, 33, N2
Wisconsin Avenue NW / River Road NW	Eastbound	Metrobus: 30S, 31, 33, N2
Wisconsin Avenue NW / Brandywine Street NW	Westbound	Metrobus: 30S, 31, 33, N2
Wisconsin Avenue NW / Albemarle Street NW Tenleytown–AU	Bidirectional	Metrobus: 30S, 31, 33, 37, 96, D32, H2, H3, H4, M4, N2, W45, W47; AU Shuttle; Washington Metro:
Wisconsin Avenue NW / Tenley Circle NW	Bidirectional	Metrobus: 30S, 31, 33, 96, D32, H2, H3, H4, W47
Wisconsin Avenue NW / Van Ness Street NW	Eastbound	Metrobus: 30S, 31, 33, 37, 96, D32, H2, H3, H4, W47
Wisconsin Avenue NW / Veazey Street NW	Westbound	Metrobus: 30S, 31, 33, 37, 96, H2, H3, H4
Wisconsin Avenue NW / Upton Street NW	Bidirectional	Metrobus: 30S, 31, 33, 96, D32 (Eastbound only), H3, H4, W47 (Eastbound only)
Wisconsin Avenue NW / Rodman Street NW	Bidirectional	Metrobus: 30S, 31, 33, 96, D32 (Eastbound only), H3, H4, W47 (Eastbound only)
Wisconsin Avenue NW / Porter Street NW	Bidirectional	Metrobus: 30S, 31, 33, 96, H3, H4
Wisconsin Avenue NW / Newark Street NW	Bidirectional	Metrobus: 30S, 31, 33, 96
Wisconsin Avenue NW / Macomb Street NW	Westbound	Metrobus: 30S, 31, 33, 96
Wisconsin Avenue NW / Woodley Road NW	Bidirectional	Metrobus: 30S, 31, 33, 37, 96
Wisconsin Avenue NW / Cathedral Avenue NW	Bidirectional	Metrobus: 30S, 31, 33, N2, N4, N6
Wisconsin Avenue NW / Garfield Street NW	Bidirectional	Metrobus: 30S, 31, 33
Wisconsin Avenue NW / Edmunds Street NW	Bidirectional	Metrobus: 30S, 31, 33
Wisconsin Avenue NW / Calvert Street NW	Bidirectional	Metrobus: 30S, 31, 33
Wisconsin Avenue NW / Hall Place NW	Bidirectional	Metrobus: 30S, 31, 33
Wisconsin Avenue NW / 35th Street NW	Bidirectional	Metrobus: 30S, 31, 33
Wisconsin Avenue NW / 34th Street NW	Bidirectional	Metrobus: 30S, 31, 33; DC Circulator: Georgetown – Union Station
Wisconsin Avenue NW / R Street NW	Bidirectional	Metrobus: 30S, 31, 33; DC Circulator: Georgetown – Union Station
Wisconsin Avenue NW / Q Street NW	Bidirectional	Metrobus: 30S, 31, 33, D1, D2, D6; DC Circulator: Georgetown – Union Station
Wisconsin Avenue NW / P Street NW	Bidirectional	Metrobus: 30S, 31, 33, G2 (Westbound only); DC Circulator: Georgetown – Union Station
Wisconsin Avenue NW / Dumbarton Street NW	Eastbound	Metrobus: 30S, 31, 33, G2 (Eastbound only); DC Circulator: Georgetown – Union Station
Wisconsin Avenue NW / N Street NW	Westbound	Metrobus: 30S, 31, 33; DC Circulator: Georgetown – Union Station
M Street NW / Wisconsin Avenue NW	Eastbound	Metrobus: 30S, 31, 33, 38B; DC Circulator: Georgetown – Union Station; Rosslyn – Georgetown – Dupont Circle
M Street NW / 31st Street NW	Westbound	Metrobus: 30S, 31, 33, 38B; DC Circulator: Georgetown – Union Station; Rosslyn – Georgetown – Dupont
M Street NW / Thomas Jefferson Street NW	Eastbound	Metrobus: 30S, 31, 33, 38B; DC Circulator: Georgetown – Union Station; Rosslyn – Georgetown – Dupont
M Street NW / 30th Street NW	Westbound	Metrobus: 30S, 31, 33, 38B; DC Circulator: Georgetown – Union Station; Rosslyn – Georgetown – Dupont
Pennsylvania Avenue NW / 28th Street NW	Bidirectional	Metrobus: 30S, 31, 33, 38B; DC Circulator: Georgetown – Union Station (Eastbound only); Rosslyn – Georgetown – Dupont (Eastbound only)
Pennsylvania Avenue NW / L Street NW	Bidirectional	Metrobus: 30S, 31, 33, 38B; DC Circulator: Georgetown – Union Station
Pennsylvania Avenue NW / 26th Street NW	Westbound	Metrobus: 30S, 31, 33, 38B; DC Circulator: Georgetown – Union Station (Eastbound only)
Pennsylvania Avenue NW / 24th Street NW	Bidirectional	Metrobus: 30S, 31, 33, 38B; DC Circulator: Georgetown – Union Station (Eastbound only)
Pennsylvania Avenue NW / 22nd Street NW	Bidirectional	Metrobus: 30S, 32, 33, 36, 38B; DC Circulator: Georgetown – Union Station
Pennsylvania Avenue NW / 21st Street NW	Eastbound	Metrobus: 30S, 32, 33, 36, 37, 39; DC Circulator: Georgetown – Union Station
I Street NW / 20th Street NW	Westbound	Metrobus: 30S, 32, 33, 36, 38B
I Street NW / 19th Street NW	Westbound	Metrobus: 30S, 32, 33, 36, 37, 39, 38B
H Street NW / 18th Street NW	Eastbound	Metrobus: 30N, 30S, 32, 33, 36
H Street NW / 17th Street NW (Eastbound) I Street NW / 17th Street NW (Westbound) Farragut Square	Bidirectional	Metrobus: 3Y, 7Y, 11Y, 16Y, 30S, 32, 33, 36, 37, 38B, 39, 42, 43, 80, D1, D4, D5, D6, G8, L2, N2, N4, N6, S1; DC Circulator: Georgetown – Union Station; MTA Maryland Bus: 901, 902, 904, 905, 909, 950, 995; Loudoun County Transit; PRTC OmniRide; Washington Metro: (at Farragut West) (at Farragut North)
H Street NW / Madison Place NW McPherson Square	Eastbound	Metrobus: 11Y, 30S, 32, 33, 36, 37, 39, 42, 43, G8, S2, S9, X2; Washington Metro:
I Street NW / 15th Street NW McPherson Square	Westbound	Metrobus: 11Y, 30S, 32, 33, 36, 37, 39, 42, 43, G8, S2, S9, X2; Washington Metro:
15th Street NW / New York Avenue NW	Eastbound	Metrobus: 11Y, 30S, 32, 33, 36
15th Street NW / F Street NW	Westbound	Metrobus: 30S, 32, 33, 36
Pennsylvania Avenue NW / 14th Street NW	Bidirectional	Metrobus: 11Y, 30S, 32, 33, 36, 52
Pennsylvania Avenue NW / 13th Street NW	Eastbound	Metrobus: 30S, 32, 33, 36, 37, 39, A9
Pennsylvania Avenue NW / 12th Street NW	Westbound	Metrobus: 30S, 32, 33, 36, 37, 39, A9
Pennsylvania Avenue NW / 10th Street NW	Bidirectional	Metrobus: 16C, 30S, 32, 33, 36, 34, 37, 59, 63, 64, P6, S2; MTA Maryland Bus: 610, 620, 640, 650, 705, 715, 820; PRTC OmniRide
Pennsylvania Avenue NW / 7th Street NW Archives-Navy Memorial-Penn Quarter	Bidirectional	Metrobus: 16C, 30S, 32, 34, 36, 37, 39, 70, 74, 79, A9, P6; MTA Maryland Bus: 610, 640, 650, 705, 810, 820, 830, 840; PRTC OmniRide; Washington Metro:
Pennsylvania Avenue NW / Constitution Avenue NW	Westbound	Metrobus: 30S, 32, 34, 36, P6, X1
4th Street SW / Madison Drive SW	Westbound	Metrobus: 30S, 32, 34, 36, P6
Independence Avenue SW / 6th Street SW	Eastbound	Metrobus: 30S, 32, 34, 36, 39
Independence Avenue SW / 4th Street SW	Westbound	Metrobus: 30S, 32, 34, 36, 39, P6
Independence Avenue SW / 3rd Street SW	Eastbound	Metrobus: 30S, 32, 34, 36, 39, P6
Independence Avenue SW / Washington Avenue SW	Westbound	Metrobus: 30S, 32, 34, 36
Independence Avenue SW / 1st Street SW	Eastbound	Metrobus: 30S, 32, 34, 36
Independence Avenue SE / South Capitol Street	Eastbound	Metrobus: 30S, 32, 34, 36
Independence Avenue SE / New Jersey Avenue SE	Westbound	Metrobus: 30S, 32, 34, 36
Independence Avenue SE / 1st Street SE	Bidirectional	Metrobus: 30S, 32, 34, 36, 39
Independence Avenue SE / 2nd Street SE	Eastbound	Metrobus: 30S, 32, 34, 36
Pennsylvania Avenue SE / 3rd Street SE	Westbound	Metrobus: 30S, 32, 34, 36
Pennsylvania Avenue SE / North Carolina Avenue SE	Eastbound	Metrobus: 30S, 32, 34, 36
Pennsylvania Avenue SE / 4th Street SE	Westbound	Metrobus: 30S, 32, 34, 36
Pennsylvania Avenue SE / 6th Street SE	Bidirectional	Metrobus: 30S, 32, 34, 36
Pennsylvania Avenue SE / 8th Street SE Eastern Market	Bidirectional	Metrobus: 30S, 32, 34, 36, 39, 90, 92; DC Circulator: Eastern Market – L'Enfant Plaza; Congress Heights – Union Station; Washington Metro:
Pennsylvania Avenue SE / E Street SE	Bidirectional	Metrobus: 30S, 32, 34, 36
Pennsylvania Avenue SE / 13th Street SE	Bidirectional	Metrobus: 30S, 32, 34, 36
Pennsylvania Avenue SE / Potomac Avenue SE Potomac Avenue	Bidirectional	Metrobus: 30S, 32, 34, 36, B2, M6, V1, V4; Washington Metro:
Pennsylvania Avenue SE / 15th Street SE	Eastbound	Metrobus: 30S, 32, 34, 36, B2, M6, V1, V4
Pennsylvania Avenue SE / L'Enfant Square SE	Bidirectional	Metrobus: 30S, 32, 34, 36, 39, B2, M6, V1, V2, V4
Pennsylvania Avenue SE / 27th Street SE	Eastbound	Metrobus: 36, M6
Pennsylvania Avenue / 28th Street SE	Westbound	Metrobus: 36, M6
Pennsylvania Avenue SE / 30th Street SE	Bidirectional	Metrobus: 36, 39, M6
Pennsylvania Avenue SE / 31st Street SE	Bidirectional	Metrobus: 36, M6
Pennsylvania Avenue SE / Branch Avenue SE	Bidirectional	Metrobus: 36, 39, M6
Branch Avenue SE / S Street SE	Westbound	Metrobus: 36
Branch Avenue SE / T Street SE	Eastbound	Metrobus: 36, S35
Branch Avenue SE / U Street SE	Bidirectional	Metrobus: 36, S35
Branch Avenue SE / Alabama Avenue SE	Bidirectional	Metrobus: 36, V7, W4
Branch Avenue SE / Bangor Street SE	Bidirectional	Metrobus: 36
Branch Avenue SE / Camden Street SE	Eastbound	Metrobus: 36
Camden Street SE / 33rd Street SE	Westbound	Metrobus: 36
33rd Street SE / Denver Street SE	Bidirectional	Metrobus: 36
Erie Street SE / 33rd Street SE	Bidirectional	Metrobus: 36
Erie Street SE / 31st Street SE	Bidirectional	Metrobus: 36
Erie Street SE / 30th Street SE	Eastbound	Metrobus: 36
30th Street SE / Erie Street SE	Westbound	Metrobus: 36
30th Street SE / Naylor Road SE	Bidirectional	Metrobus: 34, 36, W2, W3
30th Street SE / Buena Vista Terrace SE	Westbound	Metrobus: 34, 36, W2, W3
30th Street SE / Southern Avenue	Westbound	Metrobus: 34, 36, W2, W3
Southern Avenue SE / 30th Street SE	Westbound	Metrobus: 34, 36, W2, W3
#3041 Naylor Road SE	Eastbound	Metrobus: 34, 36, W2, W3
Naylor Road SE / Southern Avenue	Eastbound	Metrobus: 34, 36, W2, W3
Temple Hills, Maryland
Naylor Road Bus Bay G	Westbound stop, Eastbound terminal	Metrobus: 34, 36, 39, C12, C14, F14, H11, H12, H13; TheBus: 32; Washington Metro:

=== Route 30S stops ===
Bus stop	Direction	Connections
Bethesda, Maryland
Friendship Heights Bus Bay C	Eastbound stop, Westbound terminal	Metrobus: 30N, 31, 33, 37, E4, E6, L2, L8, N2, N4, N6, T2; Ride On: 1, 11, 23, 29, 34; Friendship Heights Village Bus; Washington Metro:
Washington, D.C.
Wisconsin Avenue NW / Jenifer Street NW	Bidirectional	Metrobus: 30N, 31, 33, N2
Wisconsin Avenue NW / Harrison Street NW	Bidirectional	Metrobus: 30N, 31, 33, N2
Wisconsin Avenue NW / Fessenden Street NW	Bidirectional	Metrobus: 30N, 31, 33, 37, N2
Wisconsin Avenue NW / Chesapeake Street NW	Bidirectional	Metrobus: 30N, 31, 33, N2
Wisconsin Avenue NW / River Road NW	Eastbound	Metrobus: 30N, 31, 33, N2
Wisconsin Avenue NW / Brandywine Street NW	Westbound	Metrobus: 30N, 31, 33, N2
Wisconsin Avenue NW / Albemarle Street NW Tenleytown–AU	Bidirectional	Metrobus: 30N, 31, 33, 37, 96, D32, H2, H3, H4, M4, N2, W45, W47; AU Shuttle; Washington Metro:
Wisconsin Avenue NW / Tenley Circle NW	Bidirectional	Metrobus: 30N, 31, 33, 96, D32, H2, H3, H4, W47
Wisconsin Avenue NW / Van Ness Street NW	Eastbound	Metrobus: 30N, 31, 33, 37, 96, D32, H2, H3, H4, W47
Wisconsin Avenue NW / Veazey Street NW	Westbound	Metrobus: 30N, 31, 33, 37, 96, H2, H3, H4
Wisconsin Avenue NW / Upton Street NW	Bidirectional	Metrobus: 30N, 31, 33, 96, D32 (Eastbound only), H3, H4, W47 (Eastbound only)
Wisconsin Avenue NW / Rodman Street NW	Bidirectional	Metrobus: 30N, 31, 33, 96, D32 (Eastbound only), H3, H4, W47 (Eastbound only)
Wisconsin Avenue NW / Porter Street NW	Bidirectional	Metrobus: 30N, 31, 33, 96, H3, H4
Wisconsin Avenue NW / Newark Street NW	Bidirectional	Metrobus: 30N, 31, 33, 96
Wisconsin Avenue NW / Macomb Street NW	Westbound	Metrobus: 30N, 31, 33, 96
Wisconsin Avenue NW / Woodley Road NW	Bidirectional	Metrobus: 30N, 31, 33, 37, 96
Wisconsin Avenue NW / Cathedral Avenue NW	Bidirectional	Metrobus: 30N, 31, 33, N2, N4, N6
Wisconsin Avenue NW / Garfield Street NW	Bidirectional	Metrobus: 30N, 31, 33
Wisconsin Avenue NW / Edmunds Street NW	Bidirectional	Metrobus: 30N, 31, 33
Wisconsin Avenue NW / Calvert Street NW	Bidirectional	Metrobus: 30N, 31, 33
Wisconsin Avenue NW / Hall Place NW	Bidirectional	Metrobus: 30N, 31, 33
Wisconsin Avenue NW / 35th Street NW	Bidirectional	Metrobus: 30N, 31, 33
Wisconsin Avenue NW / 34th Street NW	Bidirectional	Metrobus: 30N, 31, 33; DC Circulator: Georgetown – Union Station
Wisconsin Avenue NW / R Street NW	Bidirectional	Metrobus: 30N, 31, 33; DC Circulator: Georgetown – Union Station
Wisconsin Avenue NW / Q Street NW	Bidirectional	Metrobus: 30N, 31, 33, D1, D2, D6; DC Circulator: Georgetown – Union Station
Wisconsin Avenue NW / P Street NW	Bidirectional	Metrobus: 30N, 31, 33, G2 (Westbound only); DC Circulator: Georgetown – Union Station
Wisconsin Avenue NW / Dumbarton Street NW	Eastbound	Metrobus: 30N, 31, 33, G2 (Eastbound only); DC Circulator: Georgetown – Union Station
Wisconsin Avenue NW / N Street NW	Westbound	Metrobus: 30N, 31, 33; DC Circulator: Georgetown – Union Station
M Street NW / Wisconsin Avenue NW	Eastbound	Metrobus: 30N, 31, 33, 38B; DC Circulator: Georgetown – Union Station; Rosslyn – Georgetown – Dupont Circle
M Street NW / 31st Street NW	Westbound	Metrobus: 30N, 31, 33, 38B; DC Circulator: Georgetown – Union Station; Rosslyn – Georgetown – Dupont
M Street NW / Thomas Jefferson Street NW	Eastbound	Metrobus: 30N, 31, 33, 38B; DC Circulator: Georgetown – Union Station; Rosslyn – Georgetown – Dupont
M Street NW / 30th Street NW	Westbound	Metrobus: 30N, 31, 33, 38B; DC Circulator: Georgetown – Union Station; Rosslyn – Georgetown – Dupont
Pennsylvania Avenue NW / 28th Street NW	Bidirectional	Metrobus: 30N, 31, 33, 38B; DC Circulator: Georgetown – Union Station (Eastbound only); Rosslyn – Georgetown – Dupont (Eastbound only)
Pennsylvania Avenue NW / L Street NW	Bidirectional	Metrobus: 30N, 31, 33, 38B; DC Circulator: Georgetown – Union Station
Pennsylvania Avenue NW / 26th Street NW	Westbound	Metrobus: 30N, 31, 33, 38B; DC Circulator: Georgetown – Union Station (Eastbound only)
Pennsylvania Avenue NW / 24th Street NW	Bidirectional	Metrobus: 30N, 31, 33, 38B; DC Circulator: Georgetown – Union Station (Eastbound only)
Pennsylvania Avenue NW / 22nd Street NW	Bidirectional	Metrobus: 30N, 32, 33, 36, 38B; DC Circulator: Georgetown – Union Station
Pennsylvania Avenue NW / 21st Street NW	Eastbound	Metrobus: 30N, 32, 33, 36, 39; DC Circulator: Georgetown – Union Station
I Street NW / 20th Street NW	Westbound	Metrobus: 30N, 32, 33, 36, 38B
I Street NW / 19th Street NW	Westbound	Metrobus: 30N, 32, 33, 36, 37, 39, 38B
H Street NW / 18th Street NW	Eastbound	Metrobus: 30N, 32, 33, 36
H Street NW / 17th Street NW (Eastbound) I Street NW / 17th Street NW (Westbound) Farragut Square	Bidirectional	Metrobus: 3Y, 7Y, 11Y, 16Y, 30N, 32, 33, 36, 37, 38B, 39, 42, 43, 80, D1, D4, D5, D6, G8, L2, N2, N4, N6, S1; DC Circulator; Georgetown – Union Station; MTA Maryland Bus: 901, 902, 904, 905, 909, 950, 995; Loudoun County Transit; PRTC OmniRide; Washington Metro: (at Farragut West) (at Farragut North)
H Street NW / Madison Place NW McPherson Square	Eastbound	Metrobus: 11Y, 30N, 32, 33, 36, 37, 39, 42, 43, G8, S2, S9, X2; Washington Metro:
I Street NW / 15th Street NW McPherson Square	Westbound	Metrobus: 11Y, 30N, 32, 33, 36, 37, 39, 42, 43, G8, S2, S9, X2; Washington Metro:
15th Street NW / New York Avenue NW	Eastbound	Metrobus: 11Y, 30N, 32, 33, 36
15th Street NW / F Street NW	Westbound	Metrobus: 30N, 32, 33, 36
Pennsylvania Avenue NW / 14th Street NW	Bidirectional	Metrobus: 11Y, 16E, 30N, 32, 33, 36, 52
Pennsylvania Avenue NW / 13th Street NW	Eastbound	Metrobus: 30N, 32, 33, 36, 37, 39, A9
Pennsylvania Avenue NW / 12th Street NW	Westbound	Metrobus: 30N, 32, 33, 36, 37, 39, A9
Pennsylvania Avenue NW / 10th Street NW	Bidirectional	Metrobus: 16C, 30N, 32, 33, 34, 36, 37, 59, P6, S2; MTA Maryland Bus: 610, 620, 640, 650, 705, 715, 820; PRTC OmniRide
Pennsylvania Avenue NW / 7th Street NW Archives-Navy Memorial-Penn Quarter	Bidirectional	Metrobus: 16C, 30N, 32, 34, 36, 37, 39, 70, 74, 79, A9, P6; MTA Maryland Bus: 610, 640, 650, 705, 810, 820, 830, 840; PRTC OmniRide; Washington Metro:
Pennsylvania Avenue NW / Constitution Avenue NW	Westbound	Metrobus: 30N, 32, 34, 36, P6, X1
4th Street SW / Madison Drive SW	Westbound	Metrobus: 30N, 32, 34, 36, 39, P6
Independence Avenue SW / 6th Street SW	Eastbound	Metrobus: 30N, 32, 34, 36, 39
Independence Avenue SW / 4th Street SW	Westbound	Metrobus: 30N, 32, 34, 36, 39, P6
Independence Avenue SW / 3rd Street SW	Eastbound	Metrobus: 30N, 32, 34, 36, 39, P6
Independence Avenue SW / Washington Avenue SW	Westbound	Metrobus: 30N, 32, 34, 36
Independence Avenue SW / 1st Street SW	Eastbound	Metrobus: 30N, 32, 34, 36
Independence Avenue SE / South Capitol Street	Eastbound	Metrobus: 30N, 32, 34, 36
Independence Avenue SE / New Jersey Avenue SE	Westbound	Metrobus: 30N, 32, 34, 36
Independence Avenue SE / 1st Street SE	Bidirectional	Metrobus: 30N, 32, 34, 36, 39
Independence Avenue SE / 2nd Street SE	Eastbound	Metrobus: 30N, 32, 34, 36
Pennsylvania Avenue SE / 3rd Street SE	Westbound	Metrobus: 30N, 32, 34, 36
Pennsylvania Avenue SE / North Carolina Avenue SE	Eastbound	Metrobus: 30N, 32, 34, 36
Pennsylvania Avenue SE / 4th Street SE	Westbound	Metrobus: 30N, 32, 34, 36
Pennsylvania Avenue SE / 6th Street SE	Bidirectional	Metrobus: 30N, 32, 34, 36
Pennsylvania Avenue SE / 8th Street SE Eastern Market	Bidirectional	Metrobus: 30N, 32, 34, 36, 39, 90, 92; DC Circulator: Eastern Market – L'Enfant Plaza; Congress Heights – Union Station; Washington Metro:
Pennsylvania Avenue SE / E Street SE	Bidirectional	Metrobus: 30N, 32, 34, 36
Pennsylvania Avenue SE / 13th Street SE	Bidirectional	Metrobus: 30N, 32, 34, 36
Pennsylvania Avenue SE / Potomac Avenue SE Potomac Avenue	Bidirectional	Metrobus: 30N, 32, 34, 36, B2, M6, V1, V4; Washington Metro:
Pennsylvania Avenue SE / 15th Street SE	Eastbound	Metrobus: 30N, 32, 34, 36, B2, M6, V1, V4
Pennsylvania Avenue SE / L'Enfant Square SE	Bidirectional	Metrobus: 30N, 32, 34, 36, 39, B2, M6, V1, V2, V4
Minnesota Avenue SE / White Place SE	Westbound	Metrobus: 32, 34, A31, B2, V2
23rd Street SE / Q Street SE	Westbound	Metrobus: 32, 34
25th Street SE / Park Place SE	Eastbound	Metrobus: 32, 34
25th Street SE / R Street SE	Eastbound	Metrobus: 32, 34
Naylor Road SE / R Street SE	Westbound	Metrobus: 32, 34
Naylor Road SE / S Street SE	Bidirectional	Metrobus: 32, 34
Naylor Road SE / Park Naylor Apartments	Bidirectional	Metrobus: 32, 34
#2619 Naylor Road SE	Eastbound	Metrobus: 32, 34
#2637 Naylor Road SE	Westbound	Metrobus: 32, 34
Good Hope Road SE / 25th Street SE	Eastbound	Metrobus: 30S, 32, 92, A32, W2, W3, W6
Naylor Road SE / Good Hope Road SE	Westbound	Metrobus: 32, 34, 92, W2, W3, W4, W6, W8
Naylor Road SE / Alabama Avenue SE	Eastbound	Metrobus: 32, 34, 92, A32, V7, W2, W3, W4, W6, W8
Alabama Avenue SE / 25th Street SE	Eastbound	Metrobus: 32, 92, A32, V7, W4, W6
Alabama Avenue SE / Ainger Place SE	Bidirectional	Metrobus: 32, 92, A32, V7, W2, W3, W4, W6, W8
Alabama Avenue SE / Hartford Street SE	Bidirectional	Metrobus: 32, 92, A32, V7, W2, W3, W4, W6, W8
Alabama Avenue SE / Irving Place SE	Eastbound	Metrobus: 32, 92, A32, V7, W4, W6, W8
Alabama Avenue SE / Jasper Street SE	Westbound	Metrobus: 32, 92, A32, V7, W4, W6, W8
Alabama Avenue SE / 24th Street SE	Bidirectional	Metrobus: 32, 92, A32, V7, W4, W6, W8
23rd Street SE / Alabama Avenue SE	Bidirectional	Metrobus: 32, 92, A32, V7, W4, W6, W8
Savannah Street SE / 24th Street SE	Eastbound	Metrobus: 32, A32
Savannah Street SE / 23rd Street SE	Westbound	Metrobus: 32, A32
22nd Street SE / Savannah Street SE	Westbound	Metrobus: 32
22nd Street SE / Southern Avenue	Westbound	Metrobus: 32, A32, W2, W3
#3417 25th Street SE	Eastbound	Metrobus: 32, A32
25th Street SE / Southern Avenue	Eastbound	Metrobus: 32, A32
Temple Hills, Maryland
Southern Avenue / 22nd Street SE	Eastbound	Metrobus: 32, A32, W2, W3
Southern Avenue / Mississippi Avenue SE	Bidirectional	Metrobus: 32, A32, W2, W3
Southern Avenue / Valley Terrace SE Southern Avenue	Bidirectional	Metrobus: 32, A32, W1; Washington Metro:
Southern Avenue Bus Bay A	Westbound stop, Eastbound terminal	Metrobus: 32, A2, A32, D12, D13, D14, NH1, P12, P18, P19, W1, W2, W14; TheBus: 33, 35, 37; Washington Metro:

== History ==
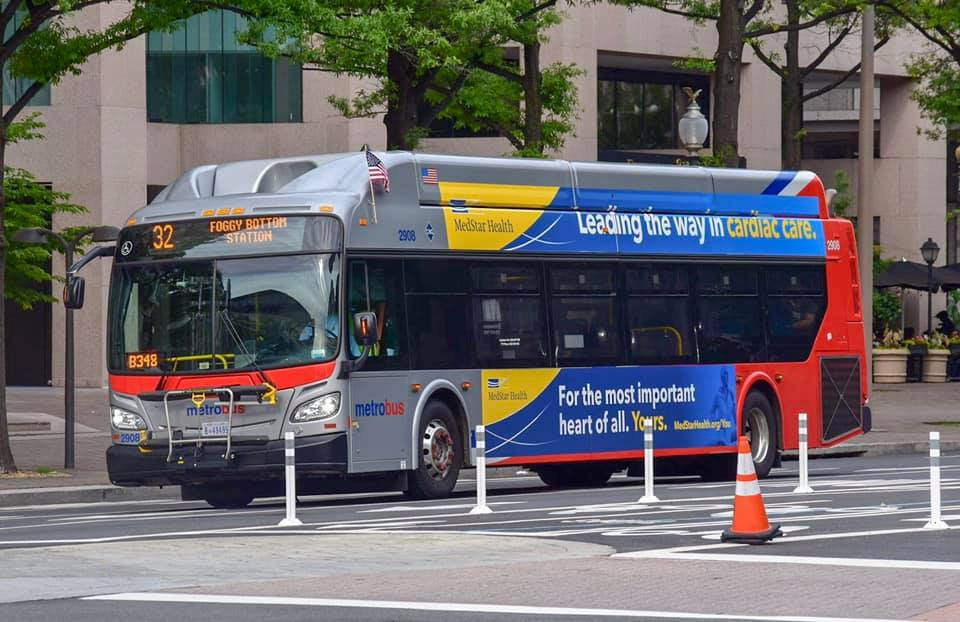
Routes 32 and 36 originally operated to Friendship Heights until 2014

The 30s lines derived from streetcar lines and the Washington and Georgetown Railroad in the 1860s. The routes were given to buses beginning in 1936. As of 2008, the 30s line had more than 20,000 passengers a day.

Before the 30N and 30S were introduced, the line was operated by the Pennsylvania Avenue Line as Routes 32 and 36 with select trips terminating at Farragut Square or Foggy Bottom–GWU station. Until June 29, 2008, the line was served by the 30, 32, 34, 35, and 36 lines. Routes 34, 35, and 36 terminated at Naylor Road station, 32 terminated at Southern Avenue station, while Route 30 terminated at Potomac Avenue station. In 2008, WMATA launched a study on the Pennsylvania Avenue line to improve services and to reduce delays and bus bunchings.

On June 29, 2008, WMATA announced the discontinuation of the 30, 34, and 35, and the introduction of the M5, 31, 37, and 39. Under the changes, Routes 32 and 36 will remain the same while the 31 adds service between Friendship Heights station and Foggy Bottom and the M5 adds service between Eastern Market station and Naylor Road station. Routes 37 and 39 are new MetroExtra Routes operating the same as Routes 31 (37) and M5 (39) but only certain stops. The M5 would later be renamed the 34 when it was extended to Archives station on December 28, 2008.

In 2013, WMATA announced proposals to simplify the busy Pennsylvania Avenue Line and Naylor Road Line. Under the proposals, Routes 32 and 36 will terminate at Foggy Bottom with a new 30s line to replace portions of the 32, and 36, and discontinue the 34 with four options to replace the 32 and 36. According to WMATA, it proposes the following:

- Option 1: Same as Route 32 between Southern Avenue and Potomac Avenue Station SE, then west to Georgetown via Lincoln Park, Union Station, and Thomas Circle, and then follow Route 31 between Georgetown and Friendship Heights.
- Option 2: Same as Route 32 between Southern Avenue and Eastern Market, then west to Georgetown via 8th Street, Massachusetts Avenue, Union Station, and Thomas Circle, and then follow Route 31 between Georgetown and Friendship Heights.
- Option 3: Same as Route 32 between Southern Avenue and Independence Ave & 7th St SW, then west to Foggy Bottom via Independence Ave, 17th St SW, Virginia Ave, and Washington Circle, and then follow Route 31 to Friendship Heights.
- Option 4: Same as Route 32 between Southern Avenue and Anacostia Freeway SE, then west to Foggy Bottom via Anacostia Freeway, Southeast/Southwest Freeway, Maine Avenue, 17th St SW, Virginia Ave, and Washington Circle, and then follow Route 31 to Friendship Heights.

On August 24, 2014, Routes 30N and 30S were introduced to replace the 32 and 36. Route 30N will operate between Friendship Heights station and Naylor Road station replacing the 36 while the 30S will operate between Friendship Heights and Southern Avenue station replacing the 32. Additionally, a new Route 33 was introduced to operate alongside the 31 between Friendship Heights and Federal Triangle station replacing the discontinued portions of the 32 and 36 and adding additional service to the 30N and 30S as both routes will operate hourly services. Routes 32 and 36 were shorten to terminate at Foggy Bottom–GWU station/Potomac Park at Virginia Avenue & E Street NW. It also merged the ″Naylor Road Line″ (Route 34) to operate as a single line. These changes were made due to overcrowding, bus bunching, simplifying the 30s lines, and to reduce delays.

The 30N and 30S are reincarnations of the former 30 and 35 routes but have the same routing as the 32 and 36 and operate as a separate line combining Routes 31, 32, 33, 34, and 36 into a single route.

Beginning on December 15, 2019, routes 30N and 30S along with routes 32, 34, 36, and 39 were rerouted to travel across the National Mall along 4th Street between Pennsylvania Avenue NW and Independence Avenue SW towards Archives, Friendship Heights and Potomac Park instead of 7th Street to provide a more direct service to the route.

During the COVID-19 pandemic, routes 30N and 30S operated on their weekend schedule during the weekdays beginning on March 16, 2020. On March 21, 2020, the line was improved to operate every 30 minutes with 15 minutes in between buses due to the weekend suspension of routes 31, 32, 33, and 36. On August 23, 2020, routes 30N and 30S restored its weekday schedule but its weekend service was suspended being replaced by routes 32, 33, and 36.

During WMATAs 2021 fiscal year budget, it was proposed for both the 30N and 30S to be eliminated and to be replaced by routes 31, 32, 33, 36, and 39 order to improve on-time performance and simplify the 30s line. However WMATA later backed out the elimination on April 2, 2020. The same proposal was brought back up in February 2021.

On September 5, 2021, Route 30N and 30S service were discontinued and replaced by Routes 31, 32, 33, and 36 which increased their frequencies to every 12 minutes daily.
