= Pennsylvania Avenue Limited Line =

Former MetroExtra route in Washington, D.C., United States

39
- Pennsylvania Avenue Limited Line

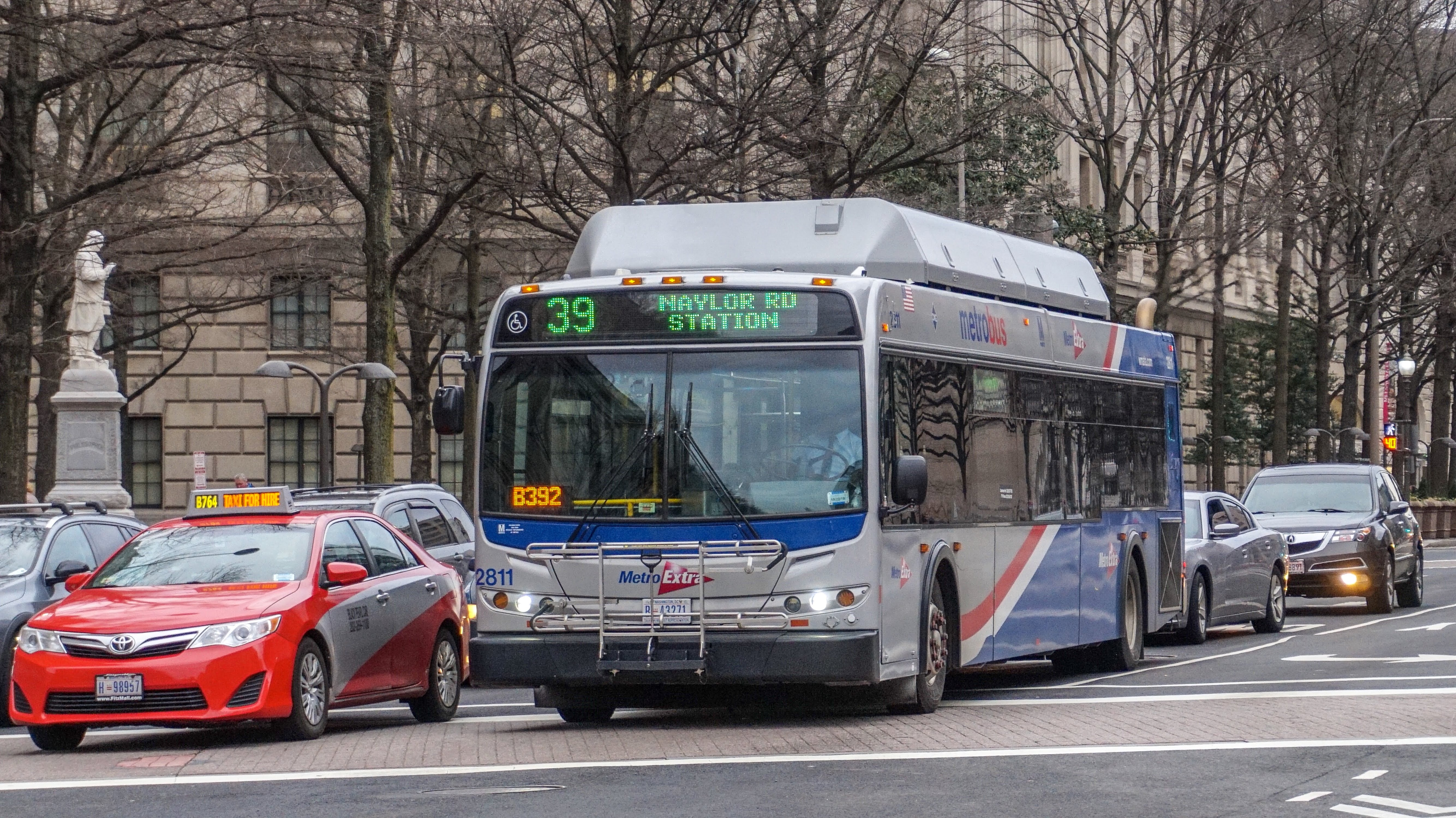
- Route 39 route at Federal Triangle

Overview
- System: Metrobus
- Operator: Washington Metropolitan Area Transit Authority
- Garage: Andrews Federal Center, Shepherd Parkway
- Status: Eliminated
- Began service: June 29, 2008
- Ended service: September 5, 2021

Route
- Locale: Prince George's County, Southeast, Southwest, Northwest
- Communities served: Foggy Bottom, Federal Triangle, Capitol Hill, Downtown, Barney Circle, Fairlawn, Good Hope, Naylor Gardens, Hillcrest
- Landmarks served: Potomac Park, Foggy Bottom-GWU station, White House, Federal Triangle, Archives station, National Mall, U.S. Capitol, Capitol South station, Eastern Market station, Potomac Avenue station, L’Enfant Square, Hillcrest, Naylor Road station
- Start: Potomac Park
- Via: Pennsylvania Avenue, Southern Avenue
- End: Naylor Road station

Service
- Level: Midday weekdays only
- Transfers: SmarTrip only

The Pennsylvania Avenue Limited Line, designated Route 39 was a limited weekday peak-hour only MetroExtra route that operated between Naylor Road station of the Green Line of the Washington Metro and Potomac Park. The route gave limited stop service to local Metrobus routes 32, 34, and 36.

== Route ==
The line operated along the Pennsylvania Avenue Line, mainly the 36 while only serving a few stops of the line. After Pennsylvania Avenue, the line went its separate ways from the 36 and followed the F14 along Southern Avenue. Similar to their local counterpart, Route 39 was supplemented by the now eliminated Wisconsin Avenue Limited Line, operated by route 37.

The line operated out of the Andrews Federal Center division with some trips operating out of Shepherd Parkway.

=== Stops ===
Bus stop	Direction	Connections
Washington, D.C.
Virginia Avenue NW / E Street NW Potomac Park	Eastbound stop, Westbound terminal	Metrobus: 11Y, 31, 32, 36, 42, 43
23rd Street NW / I Street NW Foggy Bottom station	Bidirectional	Metrobus: 31, 32, 36, Washington Metro:
H Street NW / 17th Street NW Farragut Square	Eastbound	Metrobus: 3Y, 11Y, 16Y, 33, 36, 38B, 80, D6, G8, L2, N2, N4, N6, X2; DC Circulator: Georgetown – Union Station; MTA Maryland Bus: 901, 902, 904, 905, 909, 950, 995; Loudoun County Transit; PRTC OmniRide; Washington Metro: (at Farragut West) (at Farragut North)
H Street NW / 18th Street NW Farragut Square	Westbound	Metrobus: 3Y, 11Y, 16Y, 33, 36, 38B, 80, D6, G8, L2, N2, N4, N6, X2; DC Circulator: Georgetown – Union Station; MTA Maryland Bus: 901, 902, 904, 905, 909, 950, 995; Loudoun County Transit; PRTC OmniRide; Washington Metro: (at Farragut West) (at Farragut North)
H Street NW / Madison Place NW McPherson Square station	Eastbound	Metrobus: 11Y, 32, 33, 36, 80, G8, S2, S9, X2; Washington Metro:
I Street NW / 15th Street NW McPherson Square station	Westbound	Metrobus: 11Y, 32, 33, 36, 80, G8, S2, S9, X2; Washington Metro:
Pennsylvania Avenue NW / 13th Street NW Federal Triangle station	Eastbound	Metrobus: 31, 32, 36; Washington Metro:
Pennsylvania Avenue NW / 12th Street NW Federal Triangle station	Westbound	Metrobus: 31, 32, 36; Washington Metro:
Pennsylvania Avenue NW / 7th Street NW Archives-Navy Memorial-Penn Quarter	Bidirectional	Metrobus: 31, 32, 36, 70, 74, 79, P6; Washington Metro:
Independence Avenue NW / 6th Street NW	Eastbound	Metrobus: 32, 36
Independence Avenue NW / 4th Street NW	Westbound	Metrobus: 32, 36
Independence Avenue NW / 3rd Street NW	Eastbound	Metrobus: 32, 36
Independence Avenue SE / 1st Street SE Capitol South	Bidirectional	Metrobus: 32, 36; Washington Metro:
Pennsylvania Avenue SE / 8th Street SE Eastern Market station	Bidirectional	Metrobus: 32, 36, 90, 92; Washington Metro:
Pennsylvania Avenue SE / L'Enfant Square SE	Bidirectional	Metrobus: 32, 36 B2 M6, V2, V4
Pennsylvania Avenue SE / 30th Street SE	Bidirectional	Metrobus: 36, M6,
Pennsylvania Avenue SE / Branch Avenue SE	Bidirectional	Metrobus: 36, M6,
Prince George's County, Maryland
Southern Avenue / Suitland Road	Bidirectional	Metrobus: F14, M6,
Branch Avenue / Southern Avenue	Bidirectional	Metrobus: F14
Naylor Road station Bus Bay F	Westbound stop, Eastbound terminal	Metrobus: 36 C12, C14, F14, H12; TheBus: 32; Washington Metro:

== History ==
Route 39 originally operated as the Friendship Heights-Van Ness-UDC Line and operated between Friendship Heights station and Van Ness-UDC station.

The line was reincarnated and began service on June 29, 2008, replacing routes 30, 34, and 39 along with routes 31 and 37. The route only operated up to Foggy Bottom-GWU station.

On December 15, 2019, the route was to travel across the National Mall along 4th Street between Pennsylvania Avenue NW and Independence Avenue SW to improve safety and provide more direct service. Routing along 7th Street was discontinued.

In response to the COVID-19 pandemic, WMATA suspended all 39 service on March 16, 2020.

During the suspension, WMATA proposed to eliminate Route 39 on their FY2021 budget. WMATA backed out of the proposal in April of said year. However, on September 5, 2021, the route was no longer listed on WMATA's website. Service is now only provided by local routes 32 and 36 with route 34 eliminated as well.

During WMATA's Better Bus Redesign, WMATA proposed to bring back the 39 as Route D1X, which essentially converted the current Route 36 to a limited-stop express service, operating on the current 36 routing between Naylor Road station and the intersection of Independence Avenue SW & 4th Street SW, then would be extended to Foggy Bottom station (later shorten to Archives station) via Constitution Avenue and Virginia Avenue. The D1X would make limited stops along Pennsylvania Avenue SE and all local stops in the Hillcrest neighborhood. The route was approved and beginning on June 29, 2025, the 36 was renamed to Route D1X, operating between Naylor Road station and Archives station, essentially reincarnating the former 39.
