= Route 39 (disambiguation) =

Route 39 may refer to:

- Route 39 (WMATA), a bus route in Washington, D.C.
- Route 39 (MBTA), a bus route in Boston
- London Buses route 39

== See also ==
- List of highways numbered 39
