= Union Station-L'Enfant Plaza Line =

Bus route in Washington, D.C., US

C55
- Union Station-L'Enfant Plaza Line

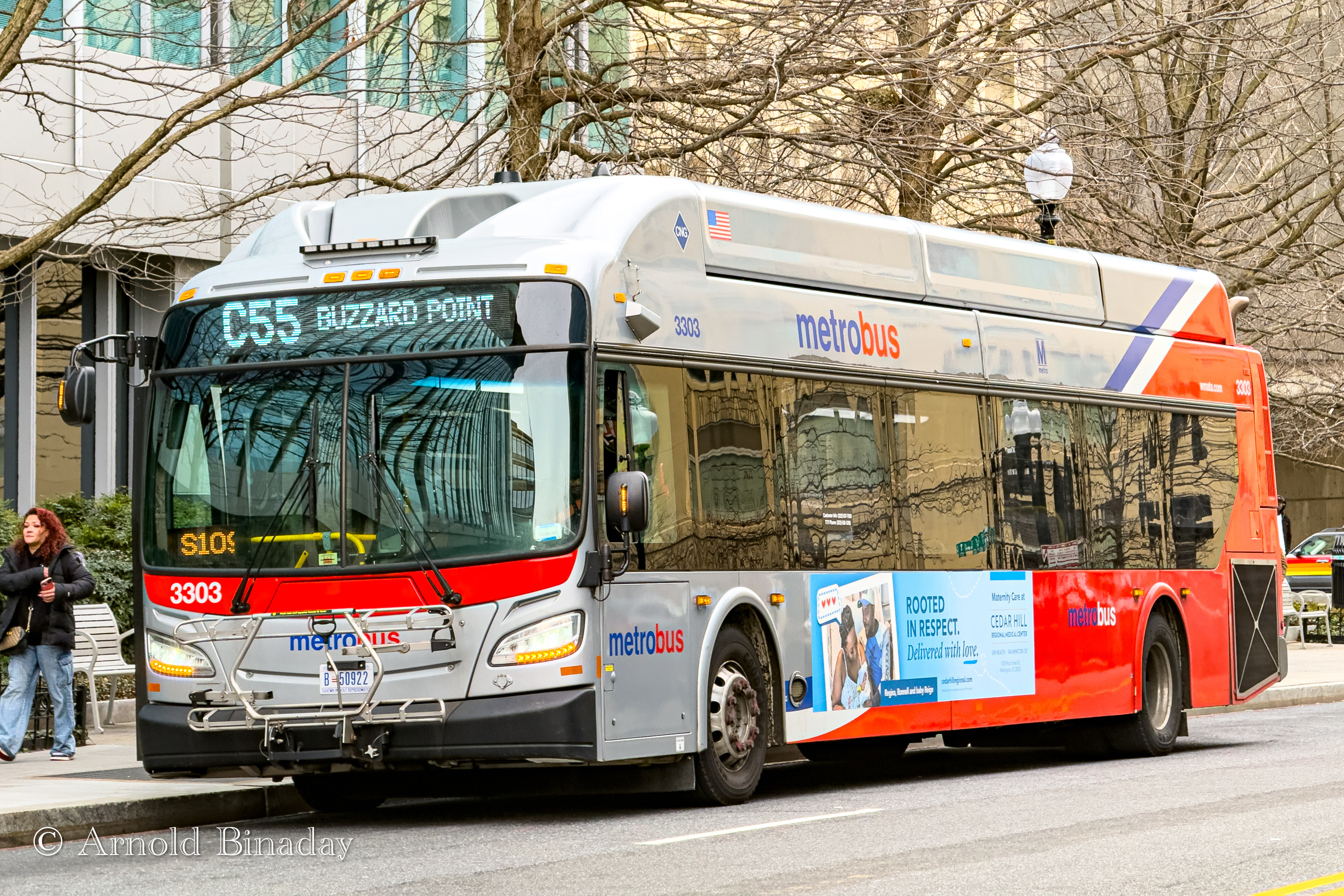
- Route C55 at L'Enfant Plaza station

Overview
- System: Metrobus
- Operator: Washington Metropolitan Area Transit Authority
- Garage: Shepherd Parkway
- Livery: Local
- Status: Active
- Began service: September 25, 2011
- Predecessors: 70, 71, 74

Route
- Locale: Northeast, Southeast, Southwest
- Communities served: Southwest Waterfront, Navy Yard, Eastern Market, Capitol Hill
- Landmarks served: L'Enfant Plaza station, The Wharf, Waterfront station, Audi Field, Nationals Park, Navy Yard-Ballpark station, Eastern Market station, Fort McNair, Audi Field, Arena Stage, Buzzard Point, Union Station, Washington Union Station
- Start: Washington Union Station
- Via: M Street SE, 8th Street SE
- End: L'Enfant Plaza station

Service
- Level: Daily
- Frequency: 15-30 minutes
- Operates: 6:00 AM – 10:00 PM
- Ridership: 273,178 (FY 2025)
- Transfers: SmarTrip only
- Timetable: Union Station–L'Enfant Plaza Line

The Union Station-L'Enfant Plaza Line, designated as Route C55, is a daily bus route that is operated by the Washington Metropolitan Area Transit Authority between Washington Union Station and L'Enfant Plaza station of the Blue, Orange, Silver, Green and Yellow Lines of the Washington Metro via Buzzard Point via M Street SE. The line operates every 15-30 minutes daily, connecting major arenas, Capitol Hill, and landmarks from Washington Union Station. The line takes roughly 45 minutes to complete.

== Route description and service ==
Route C55 operates between Washington Union Station and L'Enfant Plaza station via Buzzard Point, connecting Capitol Hill, Navy Yard and Southwest Waterfront.

Route C55 operates out of Shepherd Parkway division daily.

=== Former Route 74 stops ===
Bus stop	Direction	Connections
Northwest
Walter E. Washington Convention Center 6th Street NW / Massachusetts Avenue	Southbound station, Northbound terminal	Metrobus: 33, D4, P6; Loudoun County Commuter Bus; DC Circulator: Georgetown–Union Station
7th Street NW / Massachusetts Avenue	Northbound	Metrobus: 33, 70, D4; DC Circulator: Georgetown–Union Station
7th Street NW / H Street NW Gallery Place station	Bidirectional	Metrobus: 70, 79, 80, P6, X2, X9; Washington Metro:
7th Street NW / F Street NW Capital One Arena	Northbound	Metrobus: 70
7th Street NW / G Street NW Capital One Arena	Southbound	Metrobus: 70
7th Street NW / E Street NW	Bidirectional	Metrobus: 70, D6
7th Street NW / Pennsylvania Avenue NW Archives station	Bidirectional	Metrobus 32, 33, 36, 70, 79, P6, S2; MTA Maryland Commuter Bus: 610, 640, 650, 705, 810, 820, 830, 840; OmniRide Commuter; Washington Metro:
7th Street NW / Constitution Avenue NW	Bidirectional	Metrobus: 70, S2; OmniRide Commuter
Southwest
7th Street SW / Independence Avenue SW	Bidirectional	Metrobus 32, 33, 34, 36, 39, 70, S2; OmniRide Commuter
7th Street SW / Maryland Avenue SW L'Enfant Plaza station	Northbound	Metrobus: 33, 52, 70, A6 (Northbound only), A8 (Southbound only), S2; DC Circulator: Eastern Market – L'Enfant Plaza; MTA Maryland Commuter Bus; Loudoun County Transit; OmniRide Commuter; Ride Smart Northern Shenandoah Valley; Washington Metro:
7th Street SW / C Street SW L'Enfant Plaza station	Southbound	Metrobus: 33, 52, 70, A6 (Northbound only), A8 (Southbound only), S2; DC Circulator: Eastern Market – L'Enfant Plaza; MTA Maryland Commuter Bus; Loudoun County Transit; OmniRide Commuter; Ride Smart Northern Shenandoah Valley; Washington Metro:
7th Street SW / E Street SW	Bidirectional	Metrobus: 52 (Northbound only), A8
7th Street SW / G Street SW	Southbound	Metrobus: 52, A6, A8
7th Street SW / I Street SW	Bidirectional	Metrobus: 52, A6, A8; DC Circulator: Eastern Market - L'Enfant Plaza
Maine Avenue / 7th Street SW	Southbound	Metrobus: 52, A6, A8; DC Circulator: Eastern Market - L'Enfant Plaza
6th Street SW / K Street SW	Northbound	
M Street SW / 6th Street SW	Bidirectional	Metrobus: A6, A8; MTA Maryland Commuter Bus; OmniRide Commuter; Loudoun County Transit
M Street SW / 4th Street SW Waterfront station	Bidirectional	Metrobus: A6, A8, P6; DC Circulator: Eastern Market - L'Enfant Plaza; MTA Maryland Commuter Bus; OmniRide Commuter; Loudoun County Transit; Washington Metro:
M Street SW / Delaware Avenue SW	Southbound	Metrobus: A6, A8, P6; DC Circulator: Eastern Market–L'Enfant Plaza
Delaware Avenue SW / #1301-#1311	Southbound	
Delaware Avenue SW / Canal Street SW	Southbound	
O Street SW / First Street SW	Southbound	
Half Street SW / O Street SW Nationals Park	Southbound	
P Street SW / First Street SW	Southbound	
2nd Street SW / R Street SW Audi Field	Southbound	
V Street SW / 1st Street SW	Southbound	
T Street SW / 2nd Street SW	Southbound	
Buzzard Point 2nd Street SW / R Street SW Audi Field	Southbound terminal, Northbound station	
2nd Street SW / P Street SW	Northbound	
P Street SW / 3rd Street SW	Northbound	
P Street SW / 4th Street SW	Northbound	
4th Street SW / O Street SW	Northbound	
4th Street SW / N Street SW	Northbound	

== History ==
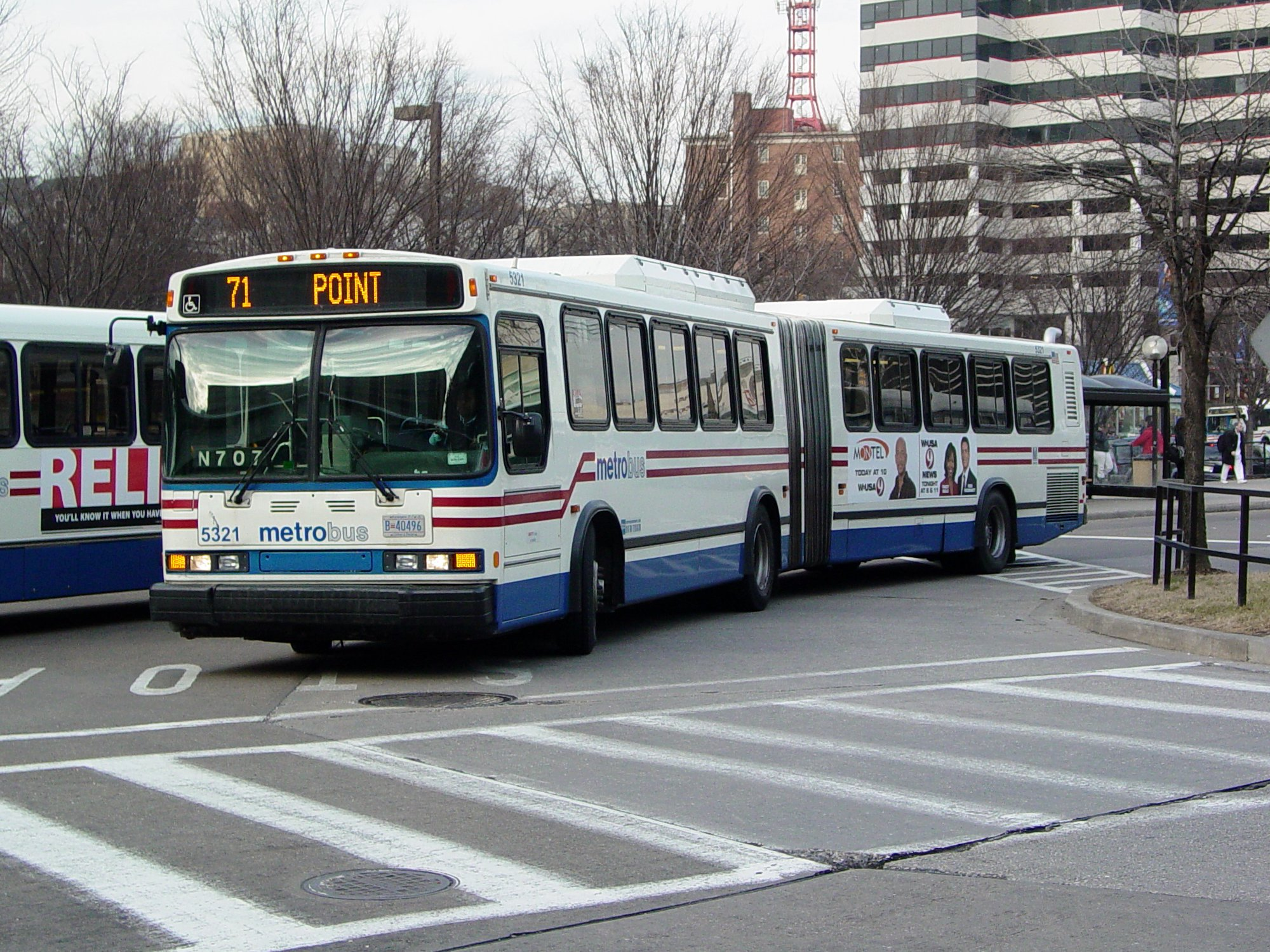
Route 71 originally ran up to Buzzard Point before being replaced by route 74.

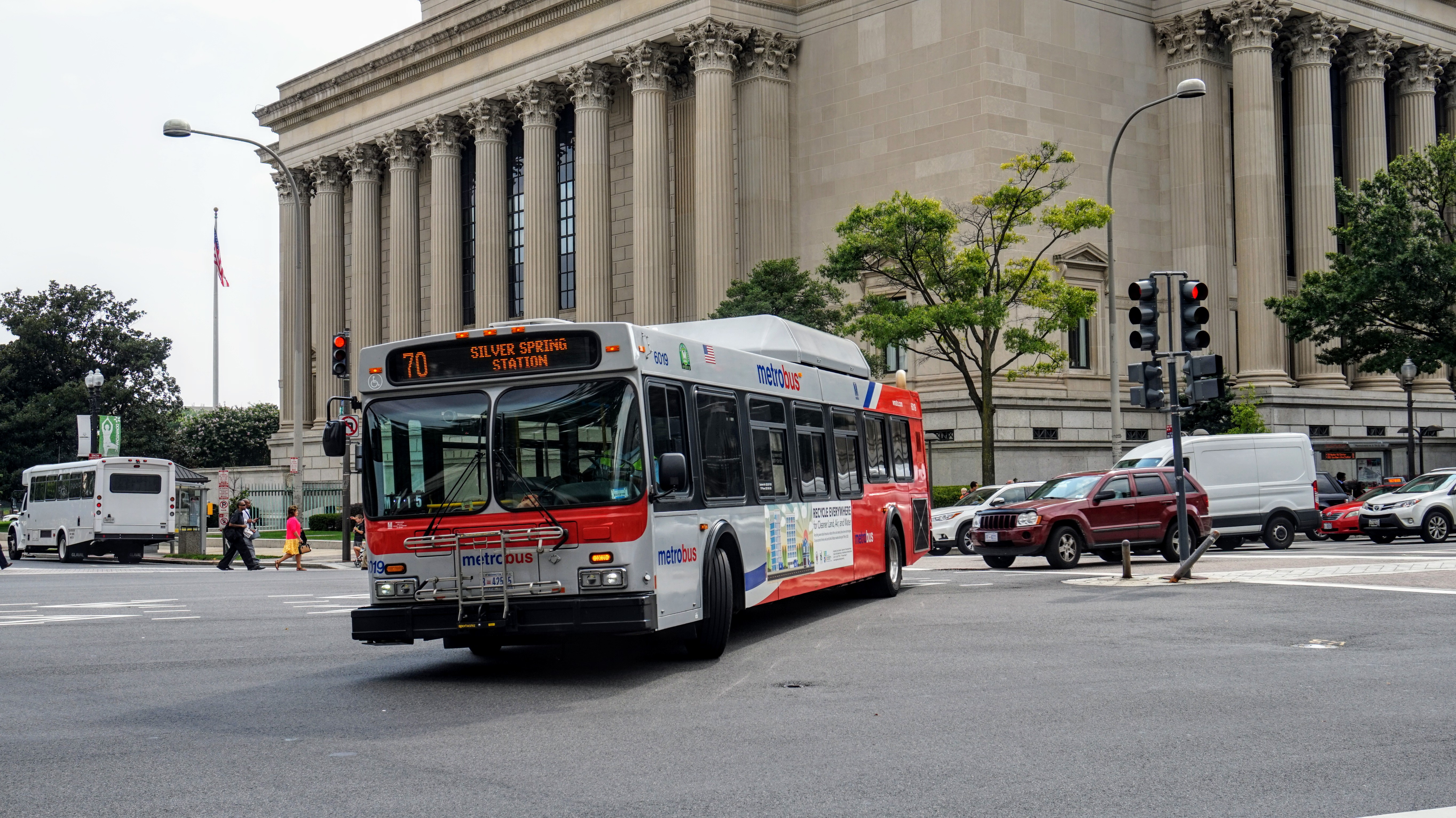
Route 70 was shorten to Archives station with service replaced by Route 74 past Archives station.

Route 74 originally operated between Soldiers Home in Northwest and Fort McNair but was discontinued between the 1970s to 1980s and replaced by routes 70 and 71.

Buzzard Point service was primarily served by route 71 which operated from Silver Spring station along Georgia Avenue while route 70 operated up to Half & O Streets SW (Nationals Park). Other routes running into Buzzard Point were routes P1, P2, V7, V8, V9, and the DC Circulator Convention Center–SW Waterfront line.

During WMATA's Fiscal Year of 2011, WMATA proposed to end route 70 and 71 service at Archives station eliminating service past Constitution Avenue in order to improve efficiency and overlap to local service. WMATA proposed to reroute the P6 along M Street SW via Delaware Avenue, Canal Street, P Street, and 4th Street back to M Street to replace Route 70 and via Delaware Avenue, Canal Street, 2nd Street, V Street, Half Street, S Street, 1st Street, P Street, and 4th Street back to M Street to replace Route 71.

Later proposals have a new route 74 which will operate between Walter E. Washington Convention Center to Buzzard Point which will discontinue route 71 and shorten route 70 to Archives station. This route will operate along 7th Street NW serving the National Mall, Capital One Arena, Chinatown, Southwest Waterfront, and Fort McNair which is similar to its prior incarnation routing.

=== New Route 74 ===
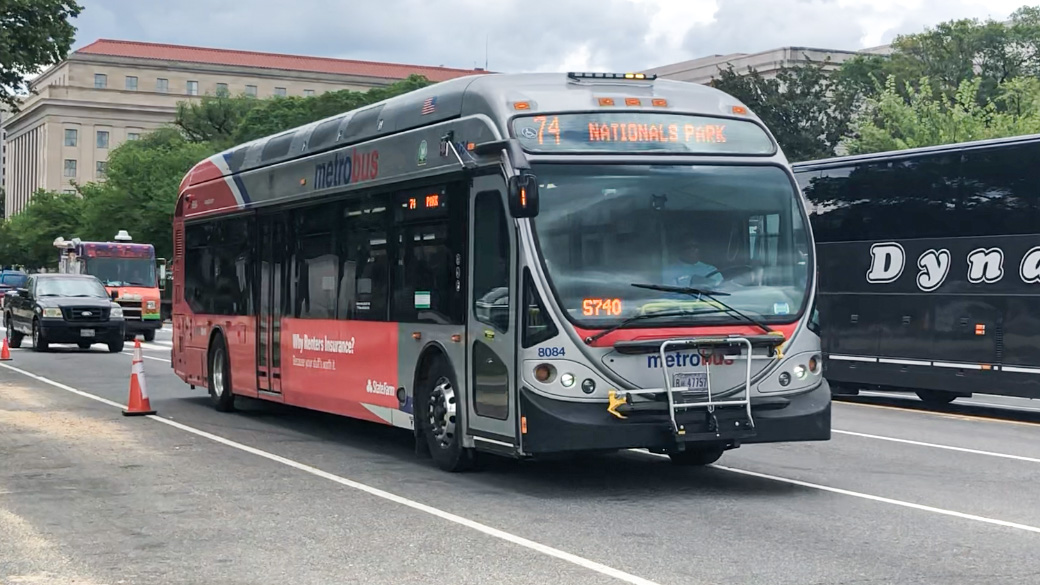
Former Route 74 along National Mall

On September 25, 2011, a new route 74 was introduced running between the Walter E. Washington Convention Center to Buzzard Point replacing the DC Circulator Convention Center-Southwest Waterfront route, replacing Route 70 past Archives station and replaced route 71 entirely. The new service will run every 18 minutes during the peak hours and 24 minutes at all other times.

=== Changes ===
On June 17, 2012, the Buzzard Point loop was discontinued due to low ridership. However, the frequency of buses was improved from 18 to 20 minutes to 12–15 minutes during the weekday peak hours in order to reduce crowding.

Later in September 2013, WMATA announced a proposal to discontinue all route 74 service and replace it with routes V7, and V8 which will be implemented in June 2014. The reason for the 74 discontinuing was low ridership on routes in Southwest and would provide a better balance of capacity and demand for routes V7, and V8. The proposal according to WMATA goes as the following:

- 74 – Discontinue all service
- V7, V8 – Reroute from M Street SW via Delaware Avenue SW, Canal Street SW, P Street SW, 4th Street SW, M Street SW, and 6th Street SW
- V7, V8 – Extend to the Convention Center (K & 6th Streets NW) via 7th Street NW
- V7, V8 – Discontinue between Minnesota Ave station and Deanwood station and between L’Enfant Plaza and Bureau of Engraving

Service will be discontinued along O Street SW, Half Street SW, and P Street SW east of Canal Street where route 74 ran. Another option for route 74 was to decrease the frequency to every 16–20 minutes weekdays and run between 6 AM to 10 PM daily. However, none of the changes were made due to customer feedback.

During the years, WMATA proposed to re-extend route 74 back to Buzzard Point in order to serve the new Audi Field in its FY2018, and the 2019 Metrobus State of Good Operations proposal.

On the FY2018 proposal, WMATA announced the following:

- Stadium Extension Option: Extend from the Half & O Streets SW terminal to the new DC United stadium (Audi Field) at 2nd & R Streets SW. Service would be extended along Half Street, P Street, 2nd Street, V Street, 1st Street, T Street, and 2nd Street to P Street SW.
- Wharf Option: Reroute to serve the new southwest Wharf development along 7th Street and Maine Avenue SW between I and 6th Streets SW.
- 4th & P Streets SW Option: Reroute service to operate in both directions along 4th Street and P Street SW between M and Canal Streets SW. From M Street & Maine Avenue (or 6th Street) SW, service would be rerouted along M Street, 4th Street, P Street, and Canal Street to O Street SW.

This will eliminate service on the following:

- Stadium Extension Option: P Street between Half Street and 2nd Street SW. One stop at P & 1st Streets would no longer have service. The stop at P & Canal streets SW would be replaced with a stop on 2nd Street, south of P Street SW.
- Wharf Option: 6th and I Streets SW. The northbound and southbound bus stops at 6th & K Streets SW would no longer have service. Route V1 will provide alternative service on parts of the former route while most stops are walking distance to the 74.
- 4th & P Streets SW Option: M Street and Delaware Avenue between 4th Street and Canal Street SW. One stop on M Street and two stops on Delaware Avenue would no longer be served. New stops would be established on southbound 4th Street and eastbound P Street SW, generally opposite existing north and eastbound stops on these streets. Route P6 will provide alternative service on parts of the former route while most stops are walking distance to the 74.

For the 2019 proposed changes, route 74 will be extended along the Stadium Extension Option similar to the FY2018 budget but with a reduced span. Service prior to 6-7 AM and after 10-11 PM will be discontinued with alternative service provided by route P6.

Day	Service Period	Current Frequency	Proposed Frequency
Weekday	6 AM to 11 PM	12 minutes (AM peak); 20 minutes (Midday); 15 minutes (PM peak); 24 minutes (Evening)	16 minutes (AM peak); 24 minutes (Midday); 18 minutes (PM peak); 30 minutes (Evening)
Weekends	7 AM to 10 PM	20–24 minutes	30 minutes

According to WMATA, the reasons for changes it goes as the following:

- Provide service to the new Buzzard Point development and Audi Field which was proposed earlier in the FY2018 budget.
- Service frequencies adjusted to maintain the same number of buses over a longer route and keep the service proposal cost neutral. The proposed extension to Buzzard Point adds approximately one mile and eight minutes per round trip.
- The proposed shortening of service hours has been requested by the District Department of Transportation. The following number of current early morning and late evening passengers would be affected by the change in service hours:

Day	Service Eliminated	Trips	Passengers	Passenger per trip
Weekday	4:45 AM–6:00 AM; 11:00 PM–12:00 AM	6; 4	39; 19	7; 5
Saturday	4:50 AM–7:00 AM; 10:00 PM–12:00 AM	11; 12	43; 51	4; 5
Sunday	4:50 AM–7:00 AM; 10:00 PM–12:00 AM	12; 12	43; 50	4; 5

Route 74 was criticized for running slow and got an F on the Metro Report Card according to Greater Greater Washington. Ward 6 Councilmember Charles Allen said in a phone interview with Greater Greater Washington:

"The changes that they [WMATA] are proposing—to extend the line in a way that the 74 bus can go further down Buzzard Point and connect to Audi Field—that’s not the problem. I think that it’s a good thing to help connect Audi Field by bus. But the way in which they’re proposing to accomplish that, to go to a stadium, is by reducing service for the residents that are the most dependent on that bus line. The 74 is just an example of how WMATA is treating bus service overall. WMATA needs to add more buses and by doing so, they keep the headways at a more manageable time frame."

Gail Fast, Ward 6D ANC Commissioner and chairperson in a phone interview with Greater Greater Washington said that getting to Audi Field is good for the District, but the way in which WMATA is executing the proposal comes at the cost of residents who will have longer wait times to use a bus that is already infrequent stating:

"If you’re going to become a 21st-century city and you want to get people away from cars, you have to provide model transport that moves people quickly. So who’s going to travel by bus? It becomes a lost route. It really isn’t the best use of that bus line."

According to WMATA Public Relations Manager Sherri Ly, she stated:

Staff is currently reviewing the public input and expects to present recommendations on the proposed bus service changes to the Board of Directors next month. All feedback provided during the public comment period is provided to the Board for consideration prior to making their decision. Any service changes, including when those changes would take effect, will be determined by the Board.

During the COVID-19 pandemic, the line was reduced to operate on its Saturday supplemental schedule during the weekdays beginning on March 16, 2020. On March 18, 2020, the line was further reduced to operate on its Sunday schedule. On March 21, 2020, weekend service was suspended.

On August 23, 2020, all weekend Route 74 service was restored and the route extended back to Buzzard Point via its 2012 routing/former route 71 Routing serving Audi Field. Service was also cut only operating every 30 minutes between 6:30 am to 10:30 pm daily.

In February 2021 during the FY2022 budget, WMATA proposed to eliminate the route if they do not get any federal funding in the second half of the fiscal year beginning in June 2022. Subsequently on April 22, 2021, WMATA approved the FY2022 budget and received federal funding to avoid service cuts.

Due to rising cases of the COVID-19 Omicron variant, the line was reduced to its Saturday service on weekdays. Full weekday service resumed on February 7, 2022.

In 2024 during WMATA's FY2024 Budget crisis, WMATA proposed to eliminate all Route 74 service. However on April 25, 2024, Metro’s Board of Directors approved a $4.8 billion capital and operating budget which avoided service cuts.

On June 16, 2024, service along 1st Street between V and T Streets, and T Street SW was eliminated with all Route 74 buses operating along Half Street, Potomac Avenue, and R Street SW.

=== Better Bus Redesign ===
In 2022, WMATA launched its Better Bus Redesign project, which aimed to redesign the entire Metrobus Network and is the first full redesign of the agency's bus network in its history.

In April 2023, WMATA launched its Draft Visionary Network. As part of the drafts, WMATA proposed to have the 74 be combined with the W2, W3, W6, and W8, operating between Archives station and Southern Avenue station via 4th Street SW, Waterfront station, Maine Avenue SW, South Capitol Street SW, Anacostia station, Stanton Road SE, Alabama Avenue SE, Congress Heights station, Wheeler Road SE, and Southern Avenue as Route DC217. Service along 7th Street NW and between Walter E. Washington Convention Center and L'Enfant Plaza station was combined with the 70 and 79 as Route DC107 between Silver Spring station and Waterfront station.

During WMATA's Revised Draft Visionary Network, WMATA renamed the DC107 to Route D42 and having the route shorten to operate between Silver Spring station and Archives station (current Route 70 and 79 routing). Route DC217 was dropped from the proposals due to strong opposition of the route not traveling deep into Buzzard Point. Instead, a new Route D14 was created to operate between Buzzard Point and Washington Union Station via Navy Yard and Capitol South, operating along 2nd Street SW, P Street SW, 4th Street SW, M Street SW/SE, New Jersey Avenue SE, D Street SW, Washington Avenue SW, Independence Avenue SW, Pennsylvania Avenue SE, 4th Street SE, 6th Street SE, and Massachusetts Avenue NE. All changes were then proposed during WMATA's 2025 Proposed Network.

During the proposals, Route D14 was renamed to Route C55 and was changed to operate to L'Enfant Plaza station via I Street SW and 7th Street SW. The roue was also changed to no longer operate along New Jersey Avenue SE, instead operating along 8th Street SE.

On November 21, 2024, WMATA approved its Better Bus Redesign Network.

Beginning on June 29, 2025, the 74 was changed to operate between L'Enfant Plaza station and Washington Union Station via Buzzard Point, M Street SE, 8th Street SE, 4th Street SE, and 6th Street SE. The line was also renamed into the C55. Additional short trips were created to operate between L'Enfant Plaza and Buzzard Point only. Service to Mount Vernon Square was eliminated.
