= Route 37 (disambiguation) =

Route 37 may refer to:

- Route 37 (WMATA), a bus route in Washington, D.C.
- London Buses route 37

== See also ==
- List of highways numbered 37
