= Wisconsin Avenue Limited Line =

37
- Wisconsin Avenue Limited Line

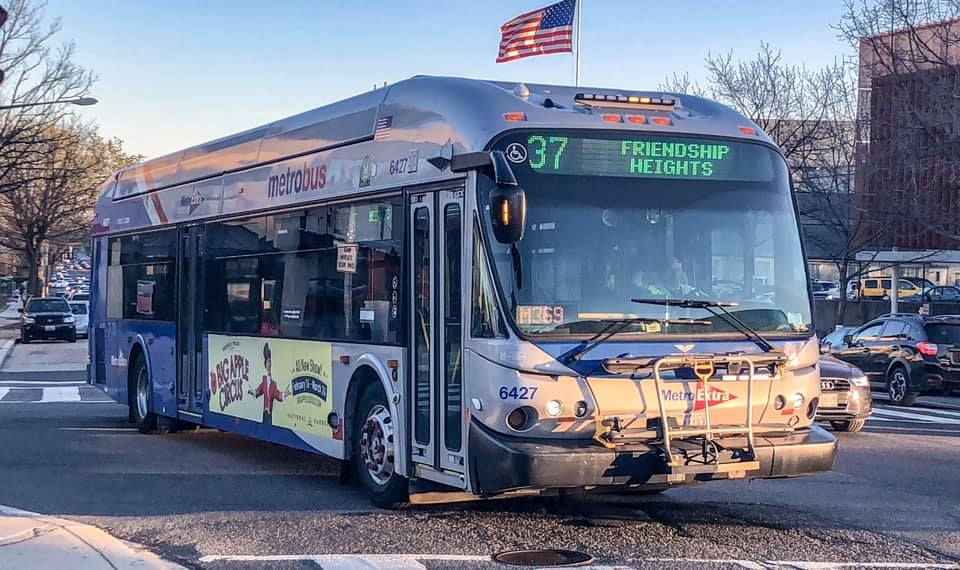
- Route 37 at Tenleytown–AU station

Overview
- System: Metrobus
- Operator: Washington Metropolitan Area Transit Authority
- Garage: Montgomery
- Livery: MetroExtra
- Status: Eliminated
- Began service: June 29, 2008
- Ended service: September 5, 2021

Route
- Locale: Montgomery County, Maryland, Northwest
- Communities served: Bethesda, Friendship Heights, Tenleytown, McLean Gardens, Downtown
- Landmarks served: Friendship Heights station, Tenleytown–AU station, Washington National Cathedral, Dupont Circle station, Farragut Square, Farragut North station, Farragut West station, McPherson Square, McPherson Square station, Federal Triangle, Federal Triangle station, Archives station
- Start: Friendship Heights station
- Via: Wisconsin Avenue NW, Massachusetts Avenue NW, Pennsylvania Avenue NW
- End: Archives station
- Length: 45 minutes
- Other routes: 31, 33, 32, 34, 36

Service
- Level: Weekday peak-hours only
- Frequency: 15-22 minutes
- Operates: 6:45 AM–9:21 AM; 4:00 PM–7:06 PM
- Transfers: SmarTrip only
- Timetable: Wisconsin Avenue Limited Line

The Wisconsin Avenue Limited Line, designated Route 37, was a weekday peak-hour bus route operated by the Washington Metropolitan Area Transit Authority between Friendship Heights station of the Red Line of the Washington Metro and Archives station of the Green and Yellow Lines of the Washington Metro. The line operated every 15–22 minutes during the weekday peak hours only in the peak direction only. Route 37 trips were roughly 45 minutes long. This route provided limited stop service along Pennsylvania Avenue and Wisconsin Avenue supplementing routes 31, and 33.

== Background ==
Route 37 operated during weekday rush hours only in the peak direction between Friendship Heights station and Archives station mostly along Wisconsin Avenue and Massachusetts Avenue. The line provided limited stop service to supplement routes 30N, 30S, 31, and 33 during the weekday peak-hours along the busy Wisconsin Avenue corridor.

Route 37 operated out of Montgomery division. It did, however, operate out of Western division until 2017.

== History ==
Route 37 originally operated as the Wisconsin Avenue Express Line which ran under a similar routing to route 37. The line originally operated between Washington Union Station and Friendship Heights station, then later between Friendship Heights and Archives station. Around the 1990s the line was shortened from Friendship Heights to Tenleytown–AU station. The line was later discontinued in 1996 and replaced by routes 30, 32, 34, 35, and 36.

In 2008, WMATA announced a study on the current 30s lines in order to simplify the line, improve services, reduce delays and bus bunchings. As of 2008, the 30s line has more than 20,000 passengers a day.

=== Reincarnation ===
On June 29, 2008, route 37 was reincarnated into service to operate as the Wisconsin Avenue Limited Line in order to provide limited-stop service between Friendship Heights station and Archives station primarily along the Wisconsin Avenue and Massachusetts Avenue corridors.

The new route 37 replaced route 30 which operated between Friendship Heights and Potomac Avenue station, a new route 39 provided limited stop service along the Pennsylvania Avenue corridor, and routes 31, 32, 36, and M5 replaced the 30, 34, and 35.

=== 2010s ===
During the 2010s, route 37 was slightly rerouted to instead turn onto Jennifer street and instead terminate at the intersection of Western Avenue and Wisconsin Avenue instead of terminating along Jennifer street to let passengers board/alight closer to the Friendship Heights station entrance along Western Avenue.

In 2019 during WMATA's FY2021 budget proposal, WMATA proposed to eliminate the 37 in order to reduce costs and alternative service at most stops. According to performance measures, the 37 averages 450 riders per weekday, 48% of riders can make exact same trip on other routes, and the farebox recovery is 14.6% (the system average is 34.3%). One of the reasons the 37 declines in ridership is due to it skipping Georgetown where ridership is high in the areas for the 30s line. WMATA later backed out the proposals due to customer pushback on April 2, 2020.

In response to the COVID-19 pandemic, WMATA suspended all 37 service on March 16, 2020.

The proposed elimination was brought back up on September 26, 2020 due to low federal funding. Route 37 had not operated since March 13, 2020 due to Metro's response to the COVID-19 pandemic. By September 5, 2021, the route was no longer listed on WMATA's website and was eliminated. Service is now only provided by local routes 31 and 33.

During WMATA's Better Bus Redesign, WMATA proposed to return the 37 to service as Route D8X and operate it between Bethesda station and Archives station via Wisconsin Avenue, following the current Route 33 routing between Friendship Heights station and Washington Circle. However the proposed Route D8X was dropped from later proposals.
