= Anacostia–Eckington Line =

Bus route in Washington, D.C., United States

P6
- Anacostia–Eckington Line

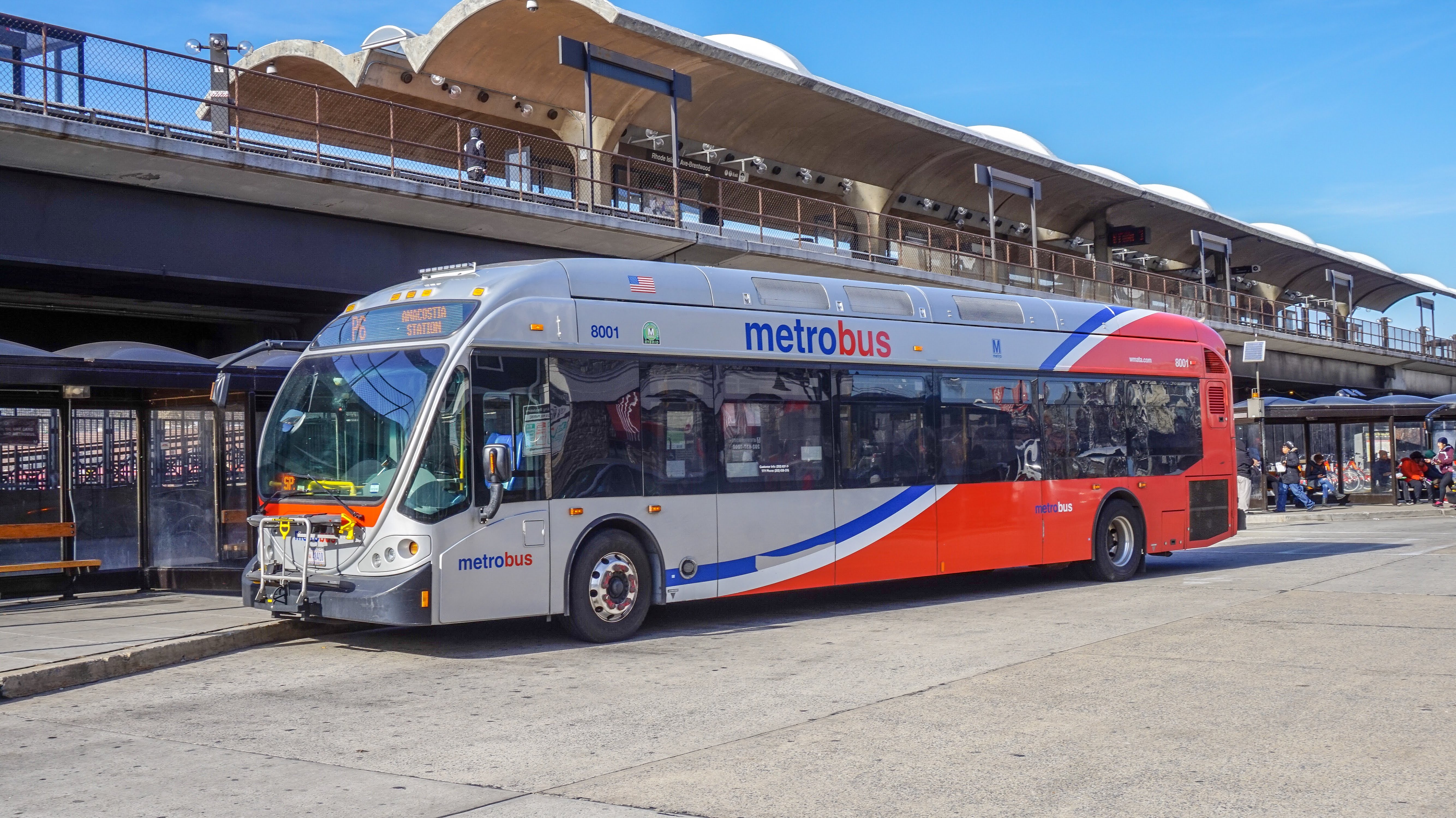
- Route P6 at Rhode Island Avenue–Brentwood station

Overview
- System: Metrobus
- Operator: Washington Metropolitan Area Transit Authority
- Garage: Shepherd Parkway
- Livery: Local
- Status: Discontinued
- Began service: 1991
- Ended service: June 29, 2025

Route
- Locale: Northeast, Northwest, Southeast, Southwest
- Communities served: Edgewood, Eckington, Chinatown, Archives, National Mall, Capitol Hill, Downtown, Navy Yard, Anacostia
- Landmarks served: Washington Navy Yard, Navy Yard–Ballpark station, Waterfront station, L'Enfant Plaza station (Late nights and early mornings only), Archives station, Metro Center station, Gallery Place station
- Start: Rhode Island Avenue–Brentwood station (L'Enfant Plaza station on late nights and early mornings only)
- Via: M Street SE/SW, Pennsylvania Avenue NW, North Capitol Street
- End: Anacostia station
- Length: 65 minutes

Service
- Level: Daily
- Frequency: 15-24 minutes (Weekdays), 30-35 minutes (Late Nights and Weekends)
- Operates: 4:10 AM – 11:50 PM
- Ridership: 1,201,144 (FY 2024)
- Transfers: SmarTrip only
- Timetable: Anacostia–Eckington Line

The Anacostia–Eckington Line, designated Route P6, was a daily bus route operated by the Washington Metropolitan Area Transit Authority between Rhode Island Avenue–Brentwood station of the Red Line of the Washington Metro and Anacostia station of the Green Line of the Washington Metro With late night and early morning trips shortened to operate between Anacostia station of the Green Line of the Washington Metro and L'Enfant Plaza station of the Blue, Orange, Silver, Green and Yellow Lines of the Washington Metro. The line operated every 15–20 minutes during the weekday peak hours, 24 minutes during the weekday midday, and 30–35 minutes during the late nights and weekends. Route P6 trips were roughly 65 minutes long.

== Background ==
Route P6 operated daily between Rhode Island Avenue–Brentwood station and Anacostia station, running into Downtown and providing service to Northeast, Northwest, Southeast, and Southwest. Select early morning and late night trips would begin/end at L'Enfant Plaza station. Other select trips would begin/end at McKinley Technology High School during school days.

Route P6 operated out of Shepherd Parkway division. Prior to 2012, the route would operate out of Bladensburg division.

== History ==
Prior to the Anacostia–Eckington Line, routes P1, P2, and P4 operated under former routes. It goes as the following:

- Route P1 originally operated as the Petworth-Potomac Park Line operating between Petworth and Potomac Park. It was later renamed route 61 and later discontinued in the 1990s after Georgia Avenue–Petworth station and the Green Line portion in inner DC opened.
- Route P2 operated as the Petworth Line operating between Petworth and Takoma station alongside route P7 which operated between Takoma station and Federal Triangle. The line was later renamed route 62 (P2) and 67 (P7).
- Route P4 operated as the 11th Street Line operating along 11th Street between Decatur and Illinois streets in Brightwood Park, and Federal Triangle until Anacostia station opened.
- Route P5 was discontinued several years prior to the 1990s.

On December 28, 1991, routes P1, P2, P4, P5, and a new route P6 was created as a new line called the Anacostia–Eckington Line to provide service from Anacostia and Downtown in order to replace the A2, A4, A6, and A8 between Anacostia and Archives station which were rerouted to Anacostia station. Route P1 operated between Anacostia station and Potomac Park (State Department) during the weekday peak-hours only. Route P2 operated between Anacostia and Archives station during the weekdays only. Routes P4, P5, and P6 operated between Rhode Island Avenue–Brentwood station, Archives station, and Metro Center station. Routes P4, P5, and P6 will run along the B6 routing between Rhode Island Avenue and Metro Center.

Routes P1 and P2 would primarily operate along M Street SE/SW, Pennsylvania Avenue NW, 4th Street, North Capitol Street while routes P4, P5, and P6 would operate a similar routing with routes P1 and P2 but operate along Capitol Hill via Virginia Avenue, 3rd Street, E Street, Washington Avenue, and C Street with route P1 primarily operating along Pennsylvania Avenue.

During the mid to late 1990s, routes P4, P5, and P6 were merged into one route as route P6 which will operate between Anacostia station and Rhode Island Avenue–Brentwood station on a combination of the B6, P4, and P5 routing.

During WMATA's FY2011 budget year, it was proposed to eliminate all route P2 service as it duplicates to route P1 and P6.

A year later during the FY2012 budget, WMATA proposed to restructure the Anacostia–Eckington Line. WMATA proposed to eliminate both routes P1 and P2 and reroute P6 along M Street SE/SW and C Street. This was because there was low ridership to the State Department, through Capitol Hill, and on late night Friday and Saturday trips, poor on-time performance and unreliable service due to outdated schedules, focus service on high ridership areas and emerging markets, and a planned closure of C Street SW and CSX tunnel project on Virginia Avenue will require to reroute P6.

On June 17, 2012, routes P1 and P2 were discontinued and replace by route P6. Route P6 was also rerouted along M Street SE/SW instead of Virginia Avenue, and via Martin Luther King Jr. Avenue instead of 13th Street, SE to align with the new 11th Street Bridge.

On June 26, 2016, route P6 was converted into a 24-hour bus route in order to replace the A42, A46, and A48. The early morning and late night P6 trips will only operate between Anacostia station and Archives station.

Beginning on June 25, 2017, routes P6 and M31 (McKinley Tech High School Line) were merged into route P6 as it would be easier to operate the line under one name. Route P6 will have select trips operated from McKinley Tech High School during the school days only.

During the COVID-19 pandemic, route P6 was relegated to operate on its Saturday supplemental schedule. However on March 18, 2020, further changes happened with route P6 operating on its Sunday schedule and weekend service being suspended beginning on March 21, 2020. Full service was restored on August 23, 2020.

In February 2021 during WMATA's FY2022 budget crisis, WMATA proposed to add late-night service to 2:00 AM on Route P6 between July and December 2021 in the first half of the fiscal year, operating between Anacostia and Archives station. However beginning in January 2022, WMATA proposed to eliminate all P6 service. Subsequently on April 22, 2021, WMATA approved the FY2022 budget and received federal funding to avoid service cuts.

On June 6, 2021, late-night service was increased to operate up to 2:00 AM and operated between Anacostia station and Archives station.

On May 29, 2022, all late night route P6 service was shortened to terminate at L'Enfant Plaza station. Also, service was rerouted along 6th Street instead of 5th Street between H and K streets NW.

On December 17, 2023, all late night route P6 service was discontinued and replaced by extended Routes A6 and A8 which were extended to end at L'Enfant Plaza station.

In 2024 during WMATA's FY2024 Budget crisis, WMATA proposed to eliminate all P6 service. However on April 25, 2024, Metro’s Board of Directors approved a $4.8 billion capital and operating budget which avoided service cuts.

As part of WMATA's Better Bus Redesign beginning on June 29, 2025, the P6 was discontinued and portions were added into a few routes. P6 service along M Street SW/SE and Anacostia station was combined with Route A8, which was extended to National Harbor (St. George Boulevard & Waterfront Street) during the day, and Eastover Shopping Center during late nights via Indian Head Highway as Route C11. The P6 portion between Rhode Island Avenue and Gallery Place station was combined with the G8 and renamed into the D32 and D34. Service between Gallery Place and Waterfront station, plus all service on 4th Street SW was discontinued.
