= 16th Street Limited =

Bus route in Washington, D.C. area

D6X
- 16th Street Limited

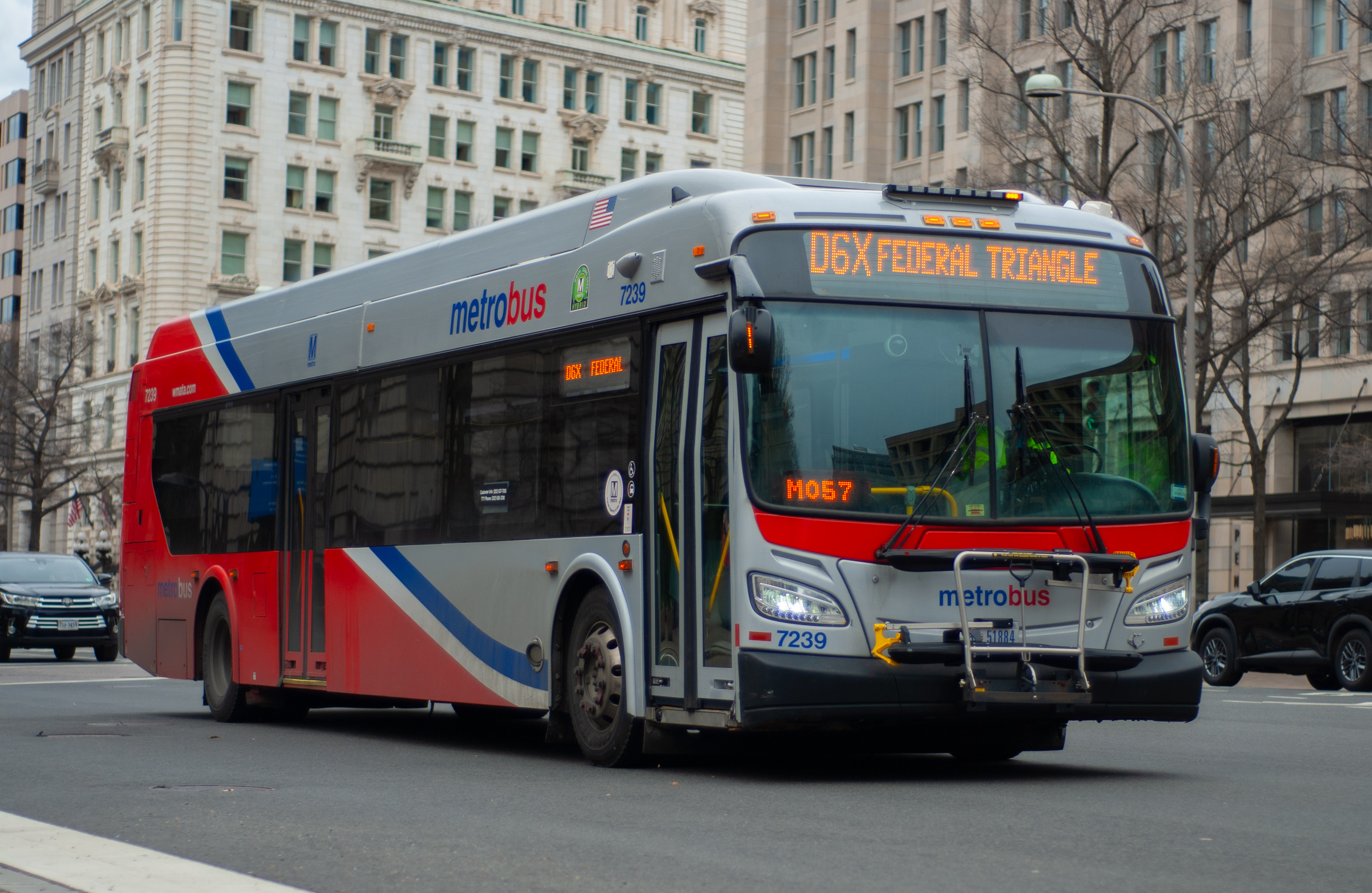
- Route D6X on Pennsylvania Avenue near Federal Triangle in March 2026

Overview
- System: Metrobus
- Operator: Washington Metropolitan Area Transit Authority
- Garage: Montgomery
- Status: In Service
- Began service: March 30, 2009
- Predecessors: S9

Route
- Locale: Northwest, Montgomery County
- Communities served: Silver Spring, Columbia Heights, Downtown, Federal Triangle
- Landmarks served: Silver Spring station, Shepherd Park, Brightwood, Carter Barron Park & Ride Lot, Crestwood, DC USA, Columbia Heights station, McPherson Square station, Franklin Square, Metro Center station, Federal Triangle station
- Start: Silver Spring station
- Via: 16th Street NW
- End: Federal Triangle
- Other routes: D60 16th Street Local

Service
- Level: Daily
- Frequency: 6-12 minutes (Weekday Peak Hours); 12 minutes (Weekday Middays, Saturdays and Sundays between 7:00 AM and 9:00 PM); 15 minutes after 9:00 PM
- Operates: Weekdays: 5:00 AM – 12:00 AM; Weekends: 5:48 AM – 12:00 AM
- Ridership: 2,092,059 (FY 2025)
- Transfers: SmarTrip only
- Timetable: 16th Street Limited Line

The 16th Street Limited, designated Route D6X, is a daily limited stop Metrobus bus route operated by the Washington Metropolitan Area Transit Authority between Silver Spring station, which is served by the Red Line of the Washington Metro, and Federal Triangle in Downtown Washington, D.C. The line operates every 5–12 minutes during rush hours, 12 minutes during weekday middays, Saturdays and Sundays between 7AM and 9PM and 15 minutes after 9PM. Trips are roughly 30–40 minutes long. This line provides additional service along the 16th Street corridor, supplementing route D60.

== Background ==
Route D6X provides daily service between Silver Spring station and Federal Triangle, running primarily on the 16th Street corridor. The route provides limited stop service supplementing local route D60.

Route D6X operates out of Montgomery division. It originally operated out of Northern division until it was closed in 2019. The line mostly utilized 2009 New Flyer DE40LFAs (6424-6472) but often used other buses from Montgomery.

=== Route D6X Stops ===
Bus stop	Direction	Connections
Northwest Washington D.C.
10th Street NW / Pennsylvania Avenue NW Federal Triangle	Northbound station, Southbound terminal	Metrobus: D10, D1X, D30, D32, D44, D60; MTA Maryland Commuter Bus; OmniRide Commuter; Washington Metro: at Federal Triangle station
11th Street NW / F Street NW Metro Center	Southbound	Metrobus: A29, A49, D10, D20, D24, D30, D32, D34, D36, D44, D5X, D60, D94; MTA Maryland Bus: 901, 902, 904, 905; Loudoun County Transit; PRTC OmniRide; Ride Smart Northern Shenandoah Valley; Washington Metro:
11th Street NW / G Street NW Metro Center	Northbound	Metrobus: A29, A49, D10, D20, D24, D30, D32, D34, D36, D44, D5X, D60, D94; MTA Maryland Bus: 901, 902, 904, 905; Loudoun County Transit; PRTC OmniRide; Ride Smart Northern Shenandoah Valley; Washington Metro:
K Street NW / 13th Street NW Franklin Square	Southbound	Metrobus: A29, A49, D10, D20, D24, D36, D50, D5X, D60, D72, D80, D94; Washington Metro: at McPherson Square station
I Street NW / 14th Street NW	Northbound	Metrobus: A29, A49, D10, D20, D24, D36, D50, D5X, D60, D72, D80, D94; Washington Metro: at McPherson Square station
K Street NW / 15th Street NW	Northbound	Metrobus: A49, D10, D20, D24, D60, D72, D80, D94
K Street NW / 16th Street NW	Southbound	Metrobus: A49, D10, D20, D24, D60, D72, D80, D94
16th Street NW / M Street NW	Bidirectional	Metrobus: D60
16th Street NW / P Street NW	Bidirectional	Metrobus: C91, D60
16th Street NW / U Street NW	Bidirectional	Metrobus: C51, C53, D60
16th Street NW / Euclid Street NW	Bidirectional	Metrobus: D60
16th Street NW / Irving Street NW Columbia Heights station	Bidirectional	Metrobus: C61, D50, D5X, D60, D72, D74; Washington Metro:
16th Street NW / Park Road NW	Bidirectional	Metrobus: D60
16th Street NW / Spring Road NW	Northbound	Metrobus: D60
16th Street NW / #3636	Southbound	Metrobus: D60
16th Street NW / Buchanan Street NW	Bidirectional	Metrobus: D60
16th Street NW / Colorado Avenue NW	Bidirectional	Metrobus: D60
16th Street NW / Missouri Avenue NW	Bidirectional	Metrobus: C81, D60
16th Street NW / Somerset Place NW	Northbound	Metrobus: C87, D60
16th Street NW / Sheridan Street NW	Southbound	Metrobus: C87, D60
16th Street NW / Aspen Street NW	Bidirectional	Metrobus: C87, D60
16th Street NW / Alaska Avenue NW	Bidirectional	Metrobus: C87, D60
16th Street NW / Geranium Street NW	Bidirectional	Metrobus: C87
16th Street NW / Hemlock Street NW	Northbound	Metrobus: C87
16th Street NW / Holly Street NW	Southbound	Metrobus: C87
16th Street NW / Juniper Street NW	Bidirectional	Metrobus: C87
16th Street NW / Kalmia Road NW	Bidirectional	Metrobus: C87
16th Street NW / Primrose Road NW	Bidirectional	Metrobus: C87
16th Street NW / Eastern Avenue NW	Northbound	Metrobus: C87, D60
16th Street NW / Portal Drive NW	Southbound	Metrobus: C87, D60
Montgomery County, Maryland
Silver Spring station Bus Bay 104	Southbound station, Northbound terminal	Metrobus: C87, D40, D4X, D60, M20, M52, M54, M70, P30; Ride On: 1, 2, 4, 5, 8, 9, 11, 12, 13, 14, 15, 16, 17, 18, 19, 20, 21, 22, 28, Flash BRT (Blue, Orange); MTA Maryland Bus: 915, 929; Shuttle-UM: 111; Peter Pan Bus; Washington Metro: MARC: Brunswick Line; MTA: Purple Line (Planned)

== History ==
Before WMATA implemented the Better Bus Redesign network, Route D6X was previously known as Routes S9. Express lines along the 16th Street corridor were originally operated by routes S3 and S5. These routes provided service from Silver Spring station to Franklin Square. However the line was discontinued in the 1990s in favor for routes S1, S2, and S4.

In 2008, a study was released along the 16th Street corridor in order to improve the line by both WMATA and the District Department of Transportation. The corridor averages a weekday ridership of 16,000 making it the third most heavily used line in the Metrobus system, Parts of the proposal was to create a new route S3 which would be a shorten routes S1, S2, and S4 and create a limited stop route S9. According to the study, it goes for routes S3 and S9:

=== S9 ===
- Purpose: The limited-stop recommendation is in response to rider feedback about long travel times and the need for greater capacity during peak periods. The S9 would operate much like the MetroExtra route 79 service on Georgia Avenue, which is specially branded and which makes only 16 stops in each direction on its route, unlike the local routes in the corridor that stop at every block or two.
- Route Description: the alignment of the S9 route would be along 16th Street between downtown and the Maryland border, with a routing onto Alaska Avenue and Eastern Avenue. The S9 route would be similar to the S2 with two notable exceptions: the southern terminal would be near McPherson Square on Eye Street between 13th and 14th Streets (rather than continuing on to Federal Triangle) and the northern terminal would be across from Silver Spring station on Colesville Road, just west of East-West Highway (due to the ongoing construction of the Paul S. Sarbanes Transit Center).
- Stops: The S9 will only serve 16 stops in both directions.
- Frequency: Under Phase 1, the line will operate every 10 minutes during weekday peak hours. Under Phase 2, the line will operate every 10 minutes during weekday peak hours and 20 minutes late evenings and midday.
- Benefits: By stopping every quarter mile or so, the S9 would offer a time-saving alternative to local routes for transit riders on 16th Street. The extra service would also add much needed capacity during peak periods.

=== S3 ===
- Purpose: The main problem identified by riders of the 16th Street Line in the rider survey and at public meetings was crowded buses. In addition to the greater capacity to the 16th Street Line offered by the S9, the S3 would add further capacity by providing peak-period service to the busiest part of the corridor.
- Route Description: The S3 would follow the same route as the S2 and S4 from Federal Triangle to about the mid-point of the corridor. At this time, it's unclear where the northern terminal of the S3 would be, though the northernmost point is expected to be Colorado Avenue.
- Stops: The S3 would stop at the same stops as the S2 and S4 local routes.
- Frequency: Under phase 2, the line will operate every 10 minutes during weekday peak hours and 15 minutes off-peak hours. Under phase 3, the line will operate every 5 minutes during weekday peak hours and 11 minutes off-peak hours.
- Benefits: By not traversing the entire length of the line, the new short-turn service would provide additional buses on 16th Street to alleviate crowding on existing routes.

The S3 proposal was mentioned again in 2013.

=== New Route S9 ===
On March 30, 2009, route S9 was introduced as a new limited-stop express route between Silver Spring station and McPherson Square station along 16th Street serving only 16 stops in both directions. The new route will supplement routes S1, S2 and S4 during the weekday peak-hours only.

The new route also debut new hybrid buses (2009 New Flyer DE40LFAs) branded under the express scheme which were used for the S9. These new buses were painted in the 4th Generation paint scheme with the primary color being blue instead of red.

Due to the Red Line collision in June 2009, route S9 service was temporarily increased and operated all day during the weekdays between June 22 to June 26. Service reverted to its regular service on June 29, 2009.

On June 17, 2012, the express branding was merged into the MetroExtra brand. All routes that originally operated under the limited-stop express branding was merged into the MetroExtra brand in order to simplify the brands. Route S9 was converted in the fall of 2012.

When the Paul S. Sarbanes Transit Center at Silver Spring station opened, route S9 was rerouted from its terminus along Wayne Avenue to the new transit center. The S9 were assigned to Bus Bay 104 on level 1.

In 2016 during WMATA FY2018 budget, WMATA proposed to add midday and Saturday service to route S9 at a 20-minute frequency and increase the peak hour frequency from 7–8 minutes to 6 minutes between Silver Spring and Missouri/Colorado avenues NW and 7–8 minutes to 3 minutes from Missouri/Colorado avenues NW to Franklin Square. These changes were recommended by DDOT's 16th Street NW Transit Priority Planning Study from April 2016:

- To better match the demand for limited-stop MetroExtra service on 16th Street.
- To alleviate overcrowding in the corridor by increasing the number of Route S9 trips, which have a faster travel time than local Route S2 and S4 trips, allowing for a net gain in number of trips.
- To make 16th Street corridor service easier to understand for customers.

Performance Measures goes as the following:

Performance Measure	Routes S2, S4	Routes S9	WMATA Guideline	Pass/Fail
Average Weekday Riders	13,258	3,913	432	Pass
Cost Recovery	38.79%	39.76%	16.6%	Pass
Subsidy per Rider	$1.85	$1.77	$4.81	Pass
Riders per Trip	36.9	37.0	10.7	Pass
Riders per Revenue Mile	4.8	4.8	1.3	Pass

- Current morning rush hour Route S2 trips are 90% full and Route S4 trips are 96% full, on average. Route S9 trips are 128% full, on average. WMATA service guidelines indicate that the maximum should be 120% for this service type.
- Current afternoon rush hour Route S2 trips are on average 89% full and Route S4 trips are 82% full, on average. Route S9 trips are 124% full, on average. WMATA service guidelines indicate that the maximum should be 120% for this service type.

On June 25, 2017, midday and Saturday service was added to route S9 that will operate every 20 minutes. Also additional Route S9 limited-stop trips will be added to the schedule, including trips between 16th Street & Missouri Avenue NW and Franklin Square during morning rush hour and between Franklin Square and 16th Street & Colorado Avenue NW during afternoon rush hour.

In 2019, WMATA proposed to reroute route S9 to remain straight along 16th Street instead of diverting onto Alaska and Eastern Avenues NW and add service to bus stops at 16th Street & Kalmia Road NW, 16th Street & Portal Drive NW and 16th Street & Eastern Avenue NW in order to replace route S4 which is proposed to be renamed route S9. Route S9 will also have service extended to 11:00 PM and new Sunday service add to operate every 20 minutes between 7:00 AM to 7:00 PM. This was due to the following according to WMATA:

- Provide faster service and improve travel time on Route S9 in response to customer feedback, allowing more frequent service for the majority of customers and to complement the District Department of Transportation’s planned 16th Street bus lanes.
- Restructure 16th Street NW corridor service to better serve existing customers and attract new riders to Metrobus.
  - Maintain local bus connections and enhance faster, limited-stop service options.
  - Improves corridor travel options within the District and between Downtown DC and Silver Spring.
  - Reduce vehicular traffic with additional MetroExtra limited-stop, direct and more frequent service.
- Improve service reliability and reduce instances where more than one bus arrives at a stop at the same time (bus bunching).
- Streamline service and simplify the route structure, making service easier for customers to understand.
- Extend all Route S9 trips to operate along the entire route between Downtown DC and Silver Spring in response to demand and where customers can make connections to other services.
- On an average weekday, 80 customers board at the Route S4 stops on 16th Street north of Alaska Avenue NW that are proposed to be eliminated. This is less than 1% (0.9%) of Route S2 and S4 ridership.
  - Route S9 is proposed to serve stops along 16th Street north of Alaska Avenue at Kalmia Road, Eastern Avenue and Portal Drive NW.
- On an average weekday, 278 customers board Route S9 at the Alaska Avenue & Kalmia Road NW bus stops. These stops will continue to be served by Route S2 and are one block away from route 79 service between Downtown DC and Silver Spring. Route S9 ridership at this stop is 4.8% of Route S9 ridership.
- On an average weekday, 84 customers (1.4% ridership) board Route S9 at the Eastern Avenue & 16th Street NW bus stops. These stops are 1-2 blocks from proposed Route S9 stops at 16th Street & Eastern Avenue and 16th Street & Portal Drive NW.

Later in 2019, WMATA proposed to raise the MetroExtra fare from $2.00 to $3.00 and extend the hours of route S9.

Beginning on March 16, 2020, in response to the COVID-19 pandemic, all route S9 service was reduced to operate on its Saturday schedule. However beginning on March 18, 2020, all route S9 service was suspended as WMATA shifted to operate on a modified Sunday schedule.

On August 23, 2020, route S9 was restored and rerouted to remain along 16th Street instead of diverting onto Alaska Avenue and Eastern Avenue in order to replace the S4. Route S9 service was also extended to 11:00 PM on Monday through Saturday and added Sunday service operating every 20 minutes between 7:00 AM to 7:00 PM. Service on Alaska Avenue and Eastern Avenue is still provided by route S2.

When Black Lives Matter Plaza opened, route S9 routing detoured along 15th Street NW at I Street resuming route on 16th Street NW at K Street going to Silver Spring and detoured along K Street NW at 16th Street resuming route on 11th Street NW at H Street going to Franklin Park when the S9 resumed service on August 23, 2020. The reroute became permanent on October 5, 2020, after the DC Council made Black Lives Matter Plaza permanent. All service on 16th Street between H and K streets was eliminated.

On June 10, 2021, WMATA proposed to increase the S9 to operate every 12 minutes daily between 7:00 AM to 9:00 PM daily as part of WMATA's Pandemic Recovery Plan.

On September 5, 2021, the line was increased to operate every 12 minutes daily.

Due to rising cases of the COVID-19 Omicron variant, the line was reduced to its Saturday service on weekdays. Full weekday service resumed on February 7, 2022.

=== Better Bus Redesign ===
In 2022, WMATA launched its Better Bus Redesign project, which aimed to redesign the entire Metrobus Network and is the first full redesign of the agency's bus network in its history.

In April 2023, WMATA launched its Draft Visionary Network. As part of the drafts, WMATA proposed to combine the S2 and S9 into one route, operating fully along 16th Street between Silver Spring station and Federal Triangle station, with a reroute to operate along 15th Street as Route DC105. Route S2 service along Alaska Avenue NW and Eastern Avenue NW was taken over by the proposed Route DC301, operating between Fort Totten station and Silver Spring station via the current Route K2 routing between Fort Totten and Takoma station, Butternut Street NW, Aspen Street NW, and 16th Street NW before operating on the S2 routing to Silver Spring via Alaska Avenue NW and Eastern Avenue NW.

During WMATA's Revised Draft Visionary Network, WMATA renamed the DC105 to Route D62, with service operating along Alaska Avenue NW and Eastern Avenue NW. The route was shorten to terminate at McPherson Square station and Franklin Square during the day with late night service continuing to Federal Triangle station and L'Enfant Plaza station. New Route D6X would operate limited-stop service between Silver Spring and Federal Triangle daily, essentially both extending the current S9 and reincarnating the former S4 route. Route DC301 was also kept as Route C69, which would later become Route C77 with the service to Silver Spring station not included. All changes were then proposed during WMATA's 2025 Proposed Network.

On November 21, 2024, WMATA approved its Better Bus Redesign Network.

Beginning on June 29, 2025, Route S9 was renamed to the D6X and was extended to Federal Triangle, essentially swapping terminals with the S2 (renamed into the D60) which was cutback to McPherson Square station in the process.
