= Archives station =

Washington Metro station

Coordinates: 38.893730°N 77.022218°W

Archives Navy Mem'l–Penn Quarter
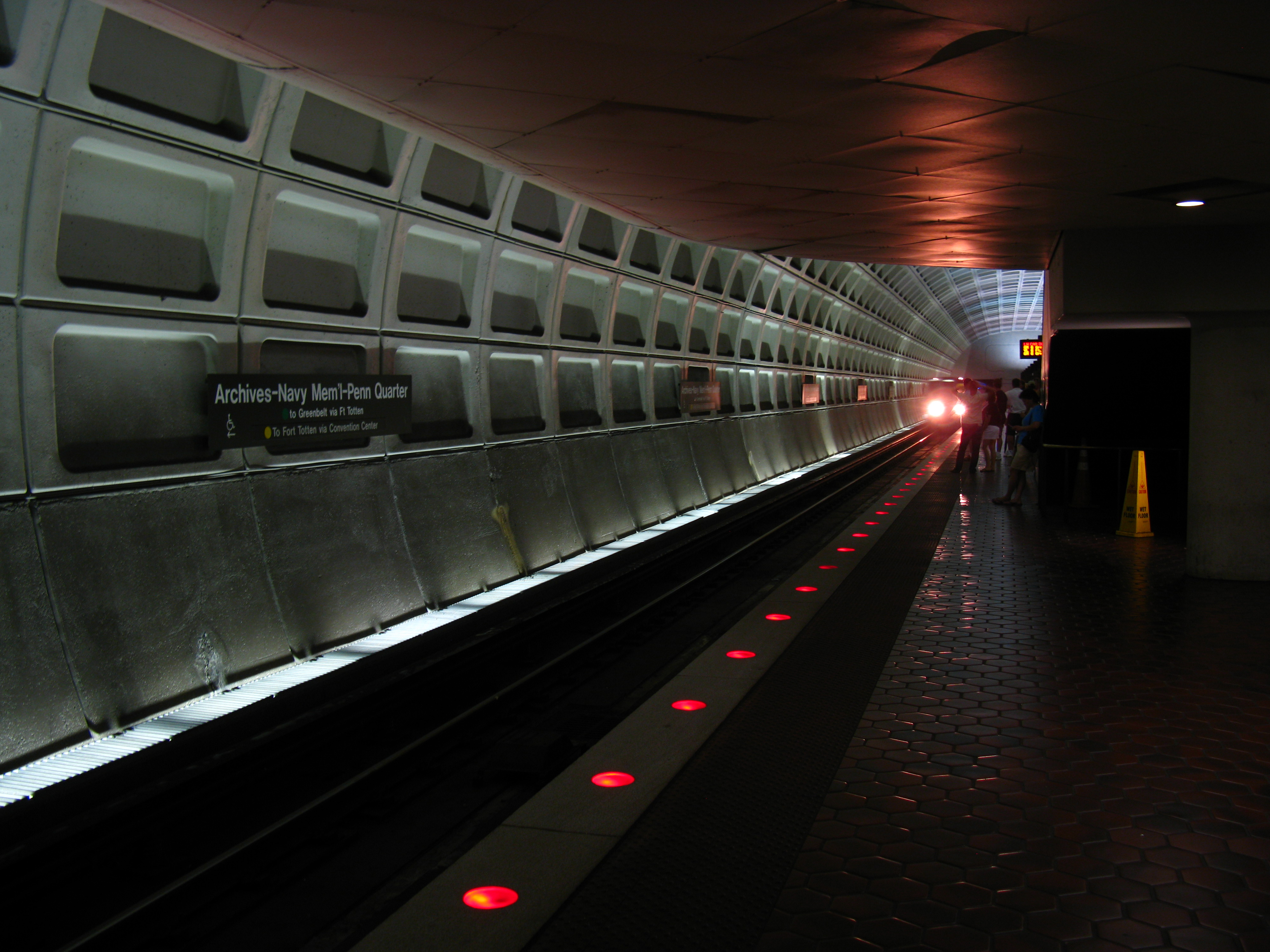
- Archives station in July 2008

General information
- Location: 300 Seventh St NW; Washington, D.C.
- Owner: Washington Metropolitan Area Transit Authority
- Platforms: 1 island platform
- Tracks: 2
- Connections: Metrobus: D10, D1X, D24, D30, D40, D4X, D60; MTA Maryland Commuter Bus: 610, 640, 650, 705, 810, 820, 830, 840; OmniRide Commuter

Construction
- Structure type: Underground
- Cycle facilities: Capital Bikeshare
- Accessible: Yes

Other information
- Station code: F02

History
- Opened: April 30, 1983; 43 years ago
- Former names: Archives (April 30, 1983-March 16, 1989); Archives-Navy Mem'l (March 16, 1989-January 22, 2004); Archives-Navy Mem'l-Penn Quarter (January 22, 2004-June 18, 2012)

Passengers
- 2025: 5,805 (average weekday)
- Rank: 24 of 98

Services
Preceding station	Washington Metro	Following station
L'Enfant Plaza toward Huntington	Yellow Line	Gallery Place toward Mount Vernon Square or Greenbelt
L'Enfant Plaza toward Branch Avenue	Green Line	Gallery Place toward Greenbelt
Route map
Location

Archives station is a Washington Metro station in Washington, D.C., on the Green and Yellow Lines.

The station is located in Northwest Washington at 7th Street between Pennsylvania and Indiana Avenues, and it is very close to Gallery Place station, so close that the lights of one station can be seen down the tunnel from the other. It takes its name from the nearby National Archives. Its subtitle is derived from the U.S. Navy Memorial and the Penn Quarter neighborhood in which the station is located. It is a popular stop for tourists, with easy access to the northern side of the National Mall.

== History ==
Service began on April 30, 1983. Its opening coincided with the completion of 3.3 miles (5.3 km) of rail south of Gallery Place to L'Enfant Plaza and across a bridge over the Potomac River to the Pentagon station.

The station was originally named Archives. In 1989, the WMATA Board of Directors voted to rename the station to Archives–Navy Mem'l to recognize the nearby U.S. Navy Memorial. In 2004, it was renamed Archives–Navy Mem'l–Penn Quarter, in recognition of the nearby Penn Quarter neighborhood. "Navy Mem'l" and "Penn Quarter" were moved to a new subtitle, leaving "Archives" as the main name, on November 3, 2011, to go into effect on June 18, 2012 upon the publication of an updated system map. New signage was installed accordingly in 2005, following the 2004 renaming, and in late-spring 2012, following the late-2011 second renaming.

There is a provision for a future second mezzanine at the south end of the station, with a knock-out panel visible on the station's south wall.

From March 26, 2020, until June 28, 2020, this station was closed due to the COVID-19 pandemic.

Between January 15 to January 21, 2021, this station was closed because of security concerns due to the 2020 Inauguration.

From October 12, 2021, to October 14, 2021, Blue Line Trains temporarily served this station due to a Blue Line Train derailment near the Pentagon Station.

== Station layout ==
The station has an island platform accessed from the corner of Indiana Avenue and Seventh Street, NW.

== Notable places nearby ==
- Department of Justice
- Embassy of Canada, Washington, D.C.
- Federal Trade Commission
- Ford's Theatre
- Grand Army of the Republic Memorial
- J. Edgar Hoover Building (headquarters of the FBI)
- Johns Hopkins University Bloomberg Center (home of the Paul H. Nitze School of Advanced International Studies)
- National Archives
- National Gallery of Art
- National Mall
- National Museum of Natural History
- Temperance Fountain
