= 16th Street Line =

Bus route in Washington, D.C. area

D60
- 16th Street Line

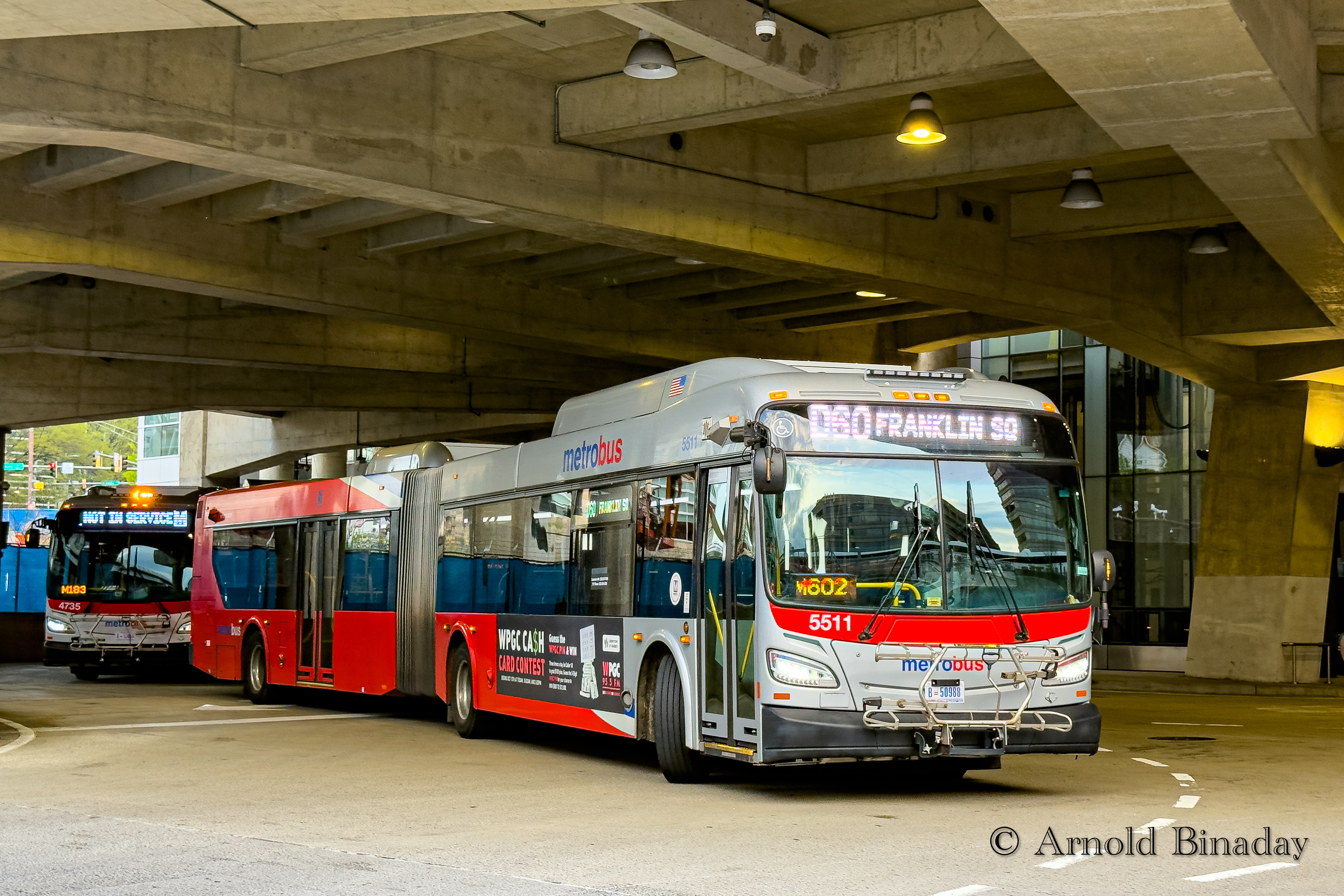
- Route D60 at Silver Spring station

Overview
- System: Metrobus
- Operator: Washington Metropolitan Area Transit Authority
- Garage: Montgomery
- Livery: Local
- Status: In Service
- Began service: 1920s
- Predecessors: S2, S4

Route
- Locale: Southwest, Northwest, Montgomery County
- Communities served: Silver Spring, Columbia Heights, Downtown, Federal Triangle
- Landmarks served: Shepherd Park, Brightwood, Carter Barron Park & Ride Lot, Crestwood, DC USA, Columbia Heights station, Franklin Square, McPherson Square station, Metro Center station, Federal Triangle station, L'Enfant Plaza station
- Start: Silver Spring station
- Via: 11th Street NW, 16th Street NW, Alaska Avenue NW, Eastern Avenue NW, Colesville Road
- End: McPherson Square station (Franklin Square Entrance); L'Enfant Plaza station (D & 7th Streets SW) (late nights and early mornings only)
- Other routes: D6X 16th Street Limited

Service
- Level: Daily
- Frequency: 10 minutes (Weekday Peak Hours); 15 minutes (Weekday Midday and Saturday); 20 minutes (Sunday); 20 minutes (Late Nights)
- Operates: 24 Hours
- Ridership: 2,279,834 (FY 2025)
- Transfers: SmarTrip only
- Timetable: 16th Street Line

The 16th Street Line, designated Route D60, is a daily bus route operated by the Washington Metropolitan Area Transit Authority between Silver Spring station, which is served by the Red Line of the Washington Metro, and McPherson Square station, which is served by the Blue, Orange, and Silver lines of the Washington Metro, with late night and early morning trips extending to L'Enfant Plaza station which is served by the Blue, Orange, Silver, Green and Yellow Lines of the Washington Metro. The line operates every 10 minutes during the weekday peak hours, 15 minutes during the weekday midday and Saturday, 20 minutes on Sunday, and 20 minutes late nights. Trips are roughly 55–60 minutes long.

== Background ==
Route D60 operates daily between McPherson Square station and Silver Spring station via the 16th Street corridor providing service along 11th Street, 16th Street, I Street (to Silver Spring), K Street (to McPherson Square/L'Enfant Plaza), Alaska Avenue NW, Eastern Avenue NW, and Colesville Road. Route D60 is also extended to L'Enfant Plaza station during the late night and early morning hours.

Route D60 operates out of Montgomery garage with some peak hour trips operated by Bladensburg garage. The line originally operated out of Northern division but was shifted to Montgomery when Northern closed on June 23, 2019. The line uses articulated buses due to its high passenger volume.

== History ==
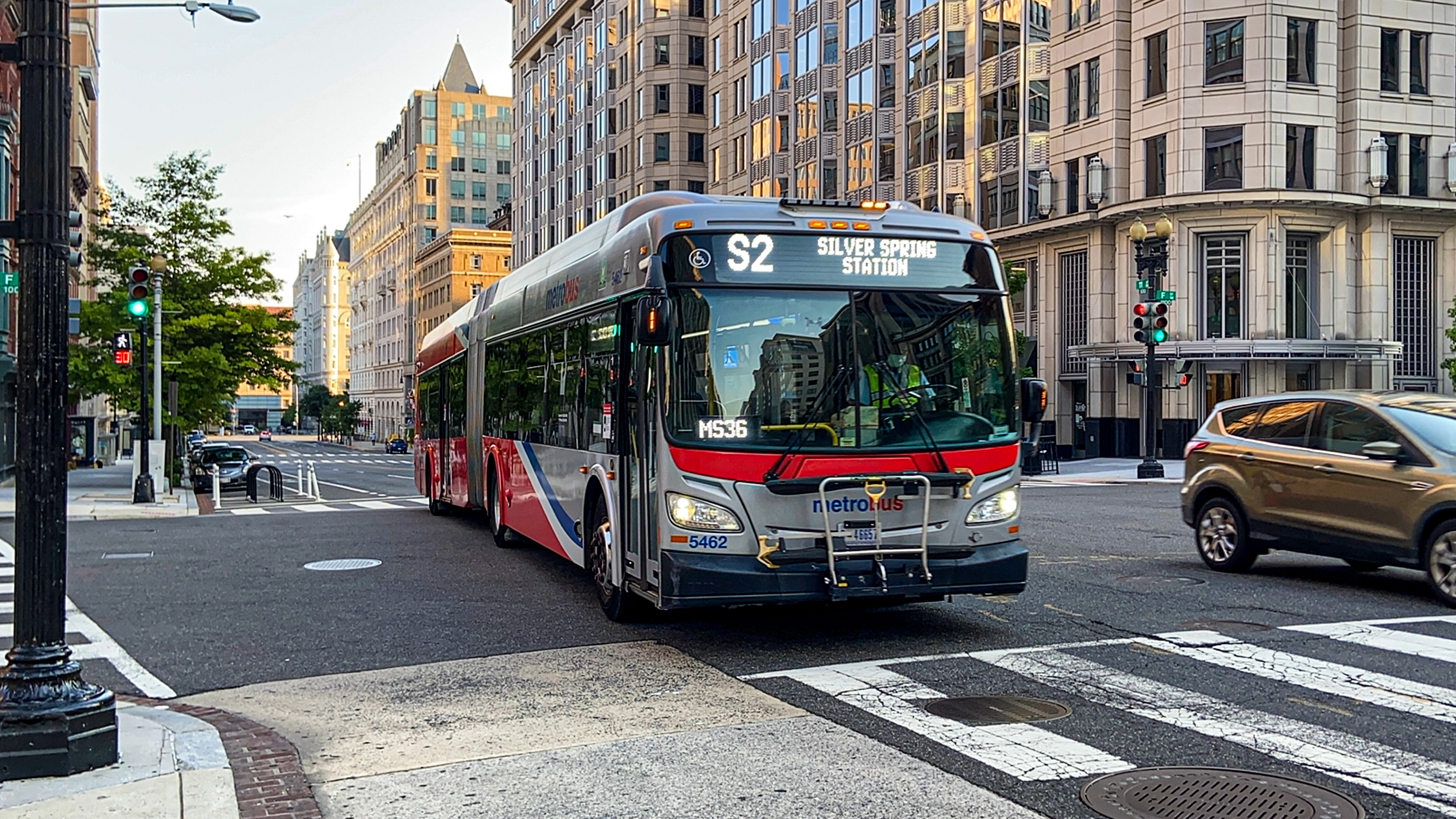
Former Route S2 at Metro Center in 2020

Before WMATA implemented the Better Bus Redesign network, Route D60 was previously known as Route S2. Before 2020, another route, which is the S4, is also part of the 16th Street Line. Routes S2 and S4 originally operated under streetcar lines under the Washington Rapid Transit Company which operated between Federal Triangle and Silver Spring, Maryland, via the 16th Street corridor. Major differences between the two routes was route S2 operated along Alaska and Eastern Avenues while route S4 remain along 16th Street. Route S4 weekend service only operated up to McPherson Square station/Franklin Square during most of its day. Route S4 was converted to a bus route in 1921 while route S2 was converted to bus in 1926.

Routes S2 and S4 were later acquired by the Capital Transit Company and later run by buses in 1933. Later on DC Transit acquired the lines in 1956 and WMATA would later acquire the S2 and S4 in 1973.

Later on, routes S1, S3 and S5 would be introduced to operate alongside the S2 and S4 during the weekday peak hours. Route S1 would operate to Potomac Park and 14th Street while routes S3 and S5 would operate via Walter Reed Medical Center. However the S3 and S5 would be eliminated later in the 1990s.

Route S2 would later have trips beginning on 14th Street (in front of WMATA's Northern bus garage) and run along 14th Street and Missouri Avenue to Federal Triangle. Select trips would also end at Carter Barron Park and Ride.

On February 19, 1978, routes S2 and S4 were rerouted to Silver Spring station via Colesville Road connecting riders to the Red Line.

=== Studies ===
In 2008, a study was released along the 16th Street corridor in order to improve the line by both WMATA and the District Department of Transportation. The corridor averages a weekday ridership of 16,000 making it the third most heavily used line in the Metrobus system, Parts of the proposal was to create a new route S3 which would be a shorten routes S1, S2, and S4 and create a limited stop route S9. According to the study, it goes for routes S3 and S9:

==== S3 ====
- Purpose: The main problem identified by riders of the 16th Street Line in the rider survey and at public meetings was crowded buses. In addition to the greater capacity to the 16th Street Line offered by the S9, the S3 would add further capacity by providing peak-period service to the busiest part of the corridor.
- Route Description: The S3 would follow the same route as the S2 and S4 from Federal Triangle to about the mid-point of the corridor. At this time, it's unclear where the northern terminal of the S3 would be, though the northernmost point is expected to be Colorado Avenue.
- Stops: The S3 would stop at the same stops as the S2 and S4 local routes.
- Frequency: Under phase 2, the line will operate every 10 minutes during weekday peak hours and 15 minutes off-peak hours. Under phase 3, the line will operate every 5 minutes during weekday peak hours and 11 minutes off-peak hours.
- Benefits: By not traversing the entire length of the line, the new short-turn service would provide additional buses on 16th Street to alleviate crowding on existing routes.

The S3 proposal was mentioned again in 2013.

==== S9 ====
- Purpose: The limited-stop recommendation is in response to rider feedback about long travel times and the need for greater capacity during peak periods. The S9 would operate much like the MetroExtra route 79 service on Georgia Avenue, which is specially branded and which makes only 16 stops in each direction on its route, unlike the local routes in the corridor that stop at every block or two.
- Route Description: the alignment of the S9 route would be along 16th Street between downtown and the Maryland border, with a routing onto Alaska Avenue and Eastern Avenue. The S9 route would be similar to the S2 with two notable exceptions: the southern terminal would be near McPherson Square on Eye Street between 13th and 14th Streets (rather than continuing on to Federal Triangle) and the northern terminal would be across from Silver Spring station on Colesville Road, just west of East-West Highway (due to the ongoing construction of the Paul S. Sarbanes Transit Center).
- Stops: The S9 will only serve 16 stops in both directions.
- Frequency: Under Phase 1, the line will operate every 10 minutes during weekday peak hours. Under Phase 2, the line will operate every 10 minutes during weekday peak hours and 20 minutes late evenings and midday.
- Benefits: By stopping every quarter mile or so, the S9 would offer a time-saving alternative to local routes for transit riders on 16th Street. The extra service would also add much needed capacity during peak periods.

In 2013, another study was made on the 16th Street corridor with the S3 proposal coming back. Routes S1, S2 and S4 are plagued with overcrowding with passengers only getting seats early on before hitting Downtown. Route S9 only made limited stops while the S2 and S4 were serving all local stops. The S3 would operate along 16th Street and can run to 16th and Half Street in order to reduce the crowding to the S lines while running up to 16th and Colorado. Other proposals were to add articulated buses to the S1, S2, and S4.

=== Articulated buses ===
Beginning on August 24, 2014, articulated buses will be debuted on the S2 and S4 during the weekdays in order to relieve crowding. Later in 2015, new buses were introduced in 2015 to operate along the 16th Street, 14th Street, and Georgia Avenue corridor.

Articulated buses operating on the line were suspended beginning in late 2018 until summer 2019 due to structural issues at Northern garage (where the S lines operate out of at the time). WMATA added extra buses to the S2 and S4 with standard 40 foot buses in order to revive the crowding along 16th Street. Northern garage was later closed in 2019 and the entire S line was shifted over to Montgomery garage with some S1, S2, and S4 trips operated by Bladensburg garage resuming articulated buses on the line.

=== Later changes ===
When the Paul S. Sarbanes Transit Center at Silver Spring station opened, routes S2 and S4 were rerouted from their terminus along Wayne Avenue to the new transit center. The S2 and S4 were assigned to Bus Bay 103 on level 1.

In 2017, WMATA proposed to eliminate all S2 trips beginning at Northern bus garage in order to simplify the line. Also, WMATA proposed to extend all route S4 service to Federal Triangle during the weekends instead of it terminating at Franklin Square. This was due to the following:

- Proposed changes were recommended by DDOT’s 16th Street NW Transit Priority Planning Study (April 2016):
  - To better match the demand for limited-stop MetroExtra service on 16th Street.
  - To alleviate overcrowding in the corridor by increasing the number of Route S9 trips, which have a faster travel time than local Route S2 and S4 trips, allowing for a net gain in number of trips.
  - To make 16th Street corridor service easier to understand for customers.

Performance measures goes as follows:

Performance Measure	Routes S2, S4	Routes S9	WMATA Guideline	Pass/Fail
Average Weekday Riders	13,258	3,913	432	Pass
Cost Recovery	38.79%	39.76%	16.6%	Pass
Subsidy per Rider	$1.85	$1.77	$4.81	Pass
Riders per Trip	36.9	37.0	10.7	Pass
Riders per Revenue Mile	4.8	4.8	1.3	Pass

- Current morning rush hour Route S2 trips are 90% full and Route S4 trips are 96% full, on average. Route S9 trips are 128% full, on average. WMATA service guidelines indicate that the maximum should be 120% for this service type.
- Current afternoon rush hour Route S2 trips are on average 89% full and Route S4 trips are 82% full, on average. Route S9 trips are 124% full, on average. WMATA service guidelines indicate that the maximum should be 120% for this service type.

On June 25, 2017, S2 trips along 14th Street were eliminated and route S4 eliminated all weekend short trips to Franklin Square. Both routes now run the full route between Silver Spring station and Federal Triangle.

In 2019, WMATA proposed to eliminate the S4 and replace the route with the S9 which will be rerouted along 16th Street instead of diverting onto Alaska and Eastern Avenues NW and add service to bus stops at 16th Street & Kalmia Road NW, 16th Street & Portal Drive NW and 16th Street & Eastern Avenue NW. This was due to the following according to WMATA:

- Provide faster service and improve travel time on Route S9 in response to customer feedback, allowing more frequent service for the majority of customers and to complement the District Department of Transportation’s planned 16th Street bus lanes.
- Restructure 16th Street NW corridor service to better serve existing customers and attract new riders to Metrobus.
  - Maintain local bus connections and enhance faster, limited-stop service options.
  - Improves corridor travel options within the District and between Downtown DC and Silver Spring.
  - Reduce vehicular traffic with additional MetroExtra limited-stop, direct and more frequent service.
- Improve service reliability and reduce instances where more than one bus arrives at a stop at the same time (bus bunching).
- Streamline service and simplify the route structure, making service easier for customers to understand.
- Extend all Route S9 trips to operate along the entire route between Downtown DC and Silver Spring in response to demand and where customers can make connections to other services.
- On an average weekday, 80 customers board at the Route S4 stops on 16th Street north of Alaska Avenue NW that are proposed to be eliminated. This is less than 1% (0.9%) of Route S2 and S4 ridership.
  - Route S9 is proposed to serve stops along 16th Street north of Alaska Avenue at Kalmia Road, Eastern Avenue and Portal Drive NW.
- On an average weekday, 278 customers board Route S9 at the Alaska Avenue & Kalmia Road NW bus stops. These stops will continue to be served by Route S2 and are one block away from route 79 service between Downtown DC and Silver Spring. Route S9 ridership at this stop is 4.8% of Route S9 ridership.
- On an average weekday, 84 customers (1.4% ridership) board Route S9 at the Eastern Avenue & 16th Street NW bus stops. These stops are 1-2 blocks from proposed Route S9 stops at 16th Street & Eastern Avenue and 16th Street & Portal Drive NW.

Route S2 will still operate along Alaska and Eastern Avenues while the S9 will remain along 16th Street instead of it diverting along the S2 route.

During the COVID-19 pandemic, Routes S2 and S4 began operating on its Saturday supplemental schedule beginning on March 16, 2020. It however began operating on its Sunday service on March 18, 2020. Weekend service on Route S2 was then suspended and the S4 was also reduced to operate every 30 minutes.

Due to the opening of Black Lives Matter Plaza, routes S2 and S4 detoured along 15th Street NW at I Street resuming route on 16th Street NW at K Street going to Silver Spring and detoured along K Street NW at 16th Street resuming route on 11th Street NW at H Street going to Federal Triangle. The reroute became permanent on October 5, 2020 after the DC Council made Black Lives Matter Plaza permanent. All service on 16th Street between H and K Streets was eliminated.

On August 23, 2020, all route S4 service was eliminated and replaced by route S9 which added daily service and remained along 16th Street. Routes S2 and S9 handled most of the discontinued S4 service but route S2 service was slightly decreased to supplement route S9.

In February 2021 during WMATA's FY2022 budget crisis, WMATA proposed to add late-night service to 2:00 AM on Route S2 between July and December 2021 in the first half of the fiscal year, but would reduce it back to midnight between January to June 2022 in the second half of the fiscal year. Subsequently on April 22, 2021, WMATA approved the FY2022 budget and received federal funding to avoid service cuts.

On June 6, 2021, late-night service was increased to operate up to 2:00 AM on Route S2.

Due to rising cases of the COVID-19 Omicron variant, the line was reduced to its Saturday service on weekdays. Full weekday service resumed on February 7, 2022.

On May 29, 2022, all late night route S2 service was extended to terminate at L'Enfant Plaza station via Pennsylvania Avenue, Constitution Avenue, and 7th Street.

On December 17, 2023, new 24 hour service was added to Route S2.

In 2024 during WMATA's FY2024 Budget crisis, WMATA proposed to reduce the frequencies of buses from 20 minutes to 30 minutes daily on the S2. However on April 25, 2024, Metro’s Board of Directors approved a $4.8 billion capital and operating budget which avoided service cuts.

=== Better Bus Redesign ===
In 2022, WMATA launched its Better Bus Redesign project, which aimed to redesign the entire Metrobus Network and is the first full redesign of the agency's bus network in its history.

In April 2023, WMATA launched its Draft Visionary Network. As part of the drafts, WMATA proposed to combine the S2 and S9 into one route, operating fully along 16th Street between Silver Spring station and Federal Triangle station, with a reroute to operate along 15th Street as Route DC105. Route S2 service along Alaska Avenue NW and Eastern Avenue NW was taken over by the proposed Route DC301, operating between Fort Totten station and Silver Spring station via the current Route K2 routing between Fort Totten and Takoma station, Butternut Street NW, Aspen Street NW, and 16th Street NW before operating on the S2 routing to Silver Spring via Alaska Avenue NW and Eastern Avenue NW.

During WMATA's Revised Draft Visionary Network, WMATA renamed the DC105 to Route D62, with service operating along Alaska Avenue NW and Eastern Avenue NW. The route was shorten to terminate at McPherson Square station and Franklin Square during the day with late night service continuing to Federal Triangle station and L'Enfant Plaza station. Route D6X would operate limited-stop service between Silver Spring and Federal Triangle daily, essentially both extending the current S9 and reincarnating the former S4 route. Route DC301 was also kept as Route C69, which would later become Route C77 with the service to Silver Spring station not included. All changes were then proposed during WMATA's 2025 Proposed Network.

During the proposals, Route D62 was renamed to Route D60 and kept its same proposed routing.

On November 21, 2024, WMATA approved its Better Bus Redesign Network.

Beginning on June 29, 2025, Route S2 was renamed to the D60 and was cutback to terminate McPherson Square station, essentially swapping terminals with the S9 (renamed into the D6X) which was extended to Federal Triangle in the process. However late night service would still serve Federal Triangle and end at L'Enfant Plaza station.

== Incidents ==
- On August 15, 2016, a car crashed into an XDE60 (5461) on the S4 along 16th Street causing the bus to crash into a brick wall. None of the 13 people on board the bus nor the driver were hurt.
