= Benning Road Line =

X1, X3
- Benning Road Line

Overview
- System: Metrobus
- Operator: Washington Metropolitan Area Transit Authority
- Garage: Southern Avenue; Shepherd Parkway; Bladensburg
- Livery: Local
- Status: Discontinued
- Ended service: September 5, 2021; X3 school trip remained in service until June 13, 2025

Route
- Locale: Northeast, Northwest
- Communities served: Central Northeast, Potomac Park (X1), Adams Morgan (X3)
- Landmarks served: Minnesota Avenue station, Benning Road NE, Hechinger Mall, H Street N.E. (X1), Washington Union Station (X1), Government Printing Office (X1), Federal Triangle (X1), Potomac Park/State Department (X1), Federal Triangle station (X1), Foggy Bottom–GWU station (X1), Gallaudet University (X3), NoMa–Gallaudet U station (X3), U Street station (X3), Reeves Center (X3), Adams Morgan (X3), Duke Ellington Bridge (X3)
- Start: Minnesota Avenue station
- Via: Benning Road, H Street NE (X1), Florida Avenue NE/NW (X3), Constitution Avenue NW (X1), U Street NW (X3)
- End: Foggy Bottom–GWU station (X1); Duke Ellington Bridge (X3)
- Length: 41 minutes (X1); 45 minutes (X3)

Service
- Level: Weekday peak hours only
- Frequency: 15-25 minutes
- Operates: 5:56 AM - 8:36 AM; 3:39 PM - 6:06 PM
- Ridership: 3,251 (FY 2024)
- Transfers: SmarTrip only
- Timetable: Benning Road Line

The Benning Road Line, designated Route X1, X3 was a weekday peak hour only bus route operated by the Washington Metropolitan Area Transit Authority between Minnesota Avenue station of the Orange Line of the Washington Metro and Foggy Bottom–GWU station of the Orange, Blue, and Silver Lines of the Washington Metro (X1) or Duke Ellington Bridge in Adams Morgan (X3). The line operates every 10–31 minutes during weekday peak hours in the peak direction only. X1 trips are roughly 41 minutes while X3 trips are roughly 45 minutes. All service along the X1 and X3 lines were suspended during the COVID-19 pandemic and later discontinued by September 5, 2021. The X3 school trip from KIPP College Prep remained in service until the 2024-25 school year.

== Background ==
Routes X1 and X3 operate every 15–25 minutes during the weekday rush hours only in the peak direction from Minnesota Avenue station to either Foggy Bottom–GWU station or Duke Ellington Bridge. During the school days, X3 trips begin at KIPP DC College Prep school going to Minnesota Avenue. The line mostly provides service from Northeast to Downtown DC without having to take the train. Routes X1 and X3 operate out of Shepherd Parkway and Southern Avenue divisions while some X3 trips are operated by Bladensburg division.

== History ==
=== Early days ===
The line originally consists of routes X1, X2, X3, X4, X5, X6, and X7 all operating under former streetcar lines. Afterwards the DC Transit company took over operating buses along H Street and Benning Road. Then WMATA took over DC Transit on December 4, 1973 and incorporated the X1, X2, X3, X4, X5, X6, X7, X8, and X9.

Route X1 operated between Minnesota Avenue station and Potomac Park via Washington Union Station, Louisiana Avenue, and Constitution Avenue. Route X2 operated between Minnesota Avenue and Union station. Route X3 operated between Minnesota Avenue and McLean Gardens. Route X4 was a new route introduced on November 24, 1978 operating between Minnesota Avenue and Lafayette Square. Route X5 was designated as "Owl Trips" operating between Seat Pleasant, Maryland and Lafayette Square. Route X6 would operate between Lafayette Square and Mayfair. All these routes mostly operate along Benning Road and H Street.

In the 1980s, route X5 and X7 were discontinued and replaced by routes X1, X2, X3, X4, and X6. No major changes were made to route.

In the 1990s, routes X3, X4, and X6 were discontinued and replaced by routes X1, and X2. Route X2 was also split from the Benning Road Line and was formed into the Benning Road-H Street Line operating on the former X4 and X6 routing between Minnesota Avenue station and Lafayette Square. Routes X1 and X3 were unaffected by any changes and continue to operate on its same routing.

=== Changes ===
On June 25, 2000, route X3 was reincarnated to operate alongside the X1 between Minnesota Avenue station and McLean Gardens during the weekday peak-hours.

On December 19, 2010, route X1 was extended from Potomac Park to Foggy Bottom–GWU station via 23rd Street.

In 2012, routes 96 and X3 were extended from McLean Gardens to Tenleytown–AU station adding additional service along Wisconsin Avenue NW from McLean Gardens due to a long-term detour route in 2012 to accommodate construction of Cathedral Commons.

In 2015 during WMATA's FY2017 budget, WMATA proposed to shorten route X3 at Duke Ellington Bridge due to low ridership between both Duke Ellington Bridge and Tenleytown–AU station since route X3 operates parallel to routes 30N, 30S, 31, 33, 96, H2, H3, and H4.

On June 26, 2016, route X3 was shortened from Tenleytown–AU station to Duke Ellington Bridge due to low ridership between the two points. Alternative service is provided by route 96.

During WMATA's FY2021 budget, it was proposed to eliminate routes X1 and X3 completely due to low ridership. The X3 trip from KIPP DC College Prep school would still operate however. Replacement service would be provided by an extended route X8 to Foggy Bottom–GWU station during the weekday peak-hours for X1 while routes X2, X9, and DC Streetcar covers most of X1 and X3 routing along H Street and Minnesota Avenue station. Routes 90, 92, and 96 also operates on most of X3's routing as well. WMATA proposed the elimination due to the availability of alternative service, including proposed extension of some route X8 weekday peak trips to Potomac Park and Foggy Bottom.

According to performance measures, it goes as the following:

	Route	Average Daily Passengers	Passengers Per Trip	Passengers Per Revenue Mile	Passengers Per Revenue Hour	Max Load (% of Seats)
September 2017	X1; X3	744; 500	41.4; 35.7	6.3; 5.9	37.8; 32.2	37 (90%); 45 (109%)
September 2018	X1; X3	698; 469	41.1; 33.5	6.2; 5.5	47.4; 35.5	39 (94%); 32 (80%)
September 2019	X1; X3	697; 460	41.0; 32.9	6.2; 5.4	47.2; 36.6	41 (105%); 30 (77%)

According to WMATA, 501 riders (42%) would still be able to make exact same trips on other services, 666 riders (56%) would require one additional transfer to complete current trip, and 22 riders (2%) may have to walk an additional 0.2 miles to a bus stop. The impacts of service proposal on the current riders by route segment are as follows according to WMATA:

	Alternative Service	Passengers Impacted	Impact
X1 passengers between Minnesota Avenue station and North Capitol Street & Massachusetts Ave NW	X2, X9 (80, D8 on North Capitol Street)	302 (43% of X1)	Exact same trip can be made on alternate services.
X1 passengers between North Capitol Street & Massachusetts Avenue NW and Potomac Park/Foggy Bottom-GWU station	X8 extended trips to Potomac Park/Foggy Bottom-GWU Station (Note: Transfer to X8 at Maryland Ave & 14th Street NE (one block from routes X2 and X9 at H & 14th streets NE), or the vicinity of Union Station (North Capitol & E streets).)	396 (57% of X1)	One transfer would be required to complete the trip.
X3 passengers between Minnesota Avenue station and Florida Avenue & Holbrook Street NE (Note: Florida Avenue & Holbrook Street is one block from routes X2 and X9 at H & 14th streets NE.)	X2, X9	72 (16% of X3)	Exact same trip can be made on an alternate services.
X3 passengers on Florida Avenue between Holbrook Street NE and 8th Street NE (Note: These are X3-only stops that would be eliminated, with alternative service available at stops within 0.2 miles.)	None	22 (5% of X3)	Some riders would have to walk up to 0.2 miles to an alternate stop.
X3 passengers between Florida Avenue & 8th Street NE and Duke Ellington Bridge	90, 92	270 (59% of X3)	One transfer would be required to complete the trip.
X3 passengers with trips entirely west of New Jersey Avenue	96	69 (15% of X3)	Exact same trip can be made on alternate services.
X3 passengers with trips entirely east of Bladensburg Road	X2, X9	58 (13% of X3)	Exact same trip can be made on alternate services.

WMATA would later back out the proposal on April 2, 2020 due to customer pushback.

On March 16, 2020, all route X1 and X3 service was suspended in response to the COVID-19 pandemic and WMATA switching to a supplemental schedule during the weekdays.

The proposed elimination was brought back up on September 26, 2020 due to low federal funding. Routes X1 and X3 has not operated since March 13, 2020 due to Metro's response to the COVID-19 pandemic.

On March 14, 2021, route X3's school trip to KIPP College Prep was restored and will operate between the school and Minnesota Avenue station. The full route remained suspended, however.

By September 5, 2021, Routes X1 and the full X3 route were eliminated. Route X3's school trip to KIPP remained in service, running during every school year when school was in session until the final day of the 2024-2025 year (June 13, 2025) before being fully discontinued as part of WMATA's Better Bus Network Redesign on June 29, 2025.
