= U Street–Congress Heights Line =

Bus route in Washington, D.C. area

C53
- U Street-Congress Heights Line

Overview
- System: Metrobus
- Operator: Washington Metropolitan Area Transit Authority
- Garage: Shepherd Parkway
- Livery: Local
- Status: Active

Route
- Locale: Northwest, Northeast, Southeast
- Communities served: Congress Heights, Garfield, Skyland, Anacostia, Navy Yard, Eastern Market, Capitol Hill, NoMa, Truxton Circle, LeDroit Park, Cardozo, Adams Morgan, Lanier Heights, Woodley Park
- Landmarks served: Congress Heights station, CareFirst Arena, Navy Yard, Eastern Market station, Gallaudet University, NoMa–Gallaudet U station, Howard University Hospital, U Street station, Reeves Center, Duke Ellington Bridge, Woodley Park station
- Start: Congress Heights station
- Via: 18th Street NW, U Street NW, Florida Avenue NW/NE, 8th Street NE/SE, Marion Barry Avenue SE, Alabama Avenue SE
- End: Woodley Park station Duke Ellington Bridge (Late night & early morning only)
- Length: 60-70 minutes
- Other routes: C51

Service
- Level: Daily
- Frequency: 10-12 minutes (7 AM to 9 PM); 15-20 minutes (9 PM to 6 AM)
- Operates: 24 Hours
- Ridership: 1,851,214 (90, FY 2025); 2,375,873 (92, FY 2025)
- Timetable: U Street–Congress Heights Line

The U Street-Congress Heights Line designated Route C53, is a daily bus route operated by the Washington Metropolitan Area Transit Authority between Congress Heights station of the Green Line of the Washington Metro and Woodley Park station of the Red Line of the Washington Metro. Late night trips are truncated to Duke Ellington Bridge. The line operate every 12 minutes between 7 AM and 9 PM, and 20 minutes after 9 PM. Route C53 trips are roughly 60 to 70 minutes.

== Background ==
Route C53 operates daily between Woodley Park and Congress Heights stations via Capitol Hill. Late night trips are truncated to Duke Ellington Bridge. The route provides crosstown service without entering Downtown Washington. Route C53 operates of Shepherd Parkway division.

=== Stops ===
Bus stop	Direction	Connections
Washington, D.C.
24th Street NW / Connecticut Avenue NW Woodley Park station	Northbound terminal, Southbound station	Metrobus: C51, D70; Washington Metro:
Calvert Street NW / Connecticut Avenue NW Woodley Park station	Bidirectional	Metrobus: C51, D70; Washington Metro:
Calvert Street NW / Biltmore Street NW	Bidirectional	Metrobus: C51
Calvert Street Loop / Calvert Street NW Duke Ellington Bridge	Northbound terminal, Southbound station (Late night and early morning only)	Metrobus: C51
Calvert Street NW / Lanier Place NW	Southbound	Metrobus: C51
Adams Mill Road NW / Columbia Road NW	Northbound	Metrobus: C51, D72, D74
18th Street NW / Columbia Road NW	Southbound	Metrobus: C51, D72, D74
18th Street NW / Belmont Road NW	Bidirectional	Metrobus: C51
18th Street NW / California Street NW	Bidirectional	Metrobus: C51
U Street NW / Florida Avenue NW	Northbound	Metrobus: C51
U Street NW / New Hampshire Avenue NW	Bidirectional	Metrobus: C51, D60, D6X
U Street NW / 14th Street NW	Bidirectional	Metrobus: C51, D50, D5X
U Street NW / 13th Street NW U Street station	Bidirectional	Metrobus: C51; Washington Metro:
U Street NW / Vermont Avenue NW U Street station	Bidirectional	Metrobus: C51, C57, D44; Washington Metro:
U Street NW / 9th Street NW	Southbound	Metrobus: C51, C57
Florida Avenue NW / 7th Street NW	Southbound	Metrobus: C51, C57, D40, D4X
Florida Avenue NW / Georgia Avenue NW	Northbound	Metrobus: C51, C57, D40, D4X
Florida Avenue NW / 6th Street NW	Bidirectional	Metrobus: C51, C57
Florida Avenue NW / New Jersey Avenue NW	Northbound	Metrobus: C51, C57, C91, D32
Florida Avenue NW / 4th Street NW	Southbound	Metrobus: C51, C57, C91, D32
Florida Avenue NW / 2nd Street NW	Northbound	Metrobus: C57
Florida Avenue NW / R Street NW	Southbound	Metrobus: C57
Florida Avenue NW / First Street NW	Bidirectional	Metrobus: C57
Florida Avenue NW / North Capitol Street	Bidirectional	Metrobus: C57, D30
Florida Avenue NE / P Street NE	Southbound	Metrobus: C57
Florida Avenue NE / Eckington Place NE	Northbound	Metrobus: C57
Florida Avenue NE / 2nd Street NE NoMa-Gallaudet U station	Bidirectional	Metrobus: C57; Washington Metro: Metropolitan Branch Trail
Florida Avenue NE / 3rd Street NE	Southbound	Metrobus: C57
Florida Avenue NE / 5th Street NE	Bidirectional	Metrobus: C57
Florida Avenue NE / 7th Street NE	Bidirectional	Metrobus: C57
8th Street NE / K Street NE	Bidirectional	Metrobus: C71, D36
8th Street NE / H Street NE	Bidirectional	Metrobus: D20, D2X
8th Street NE / F Street NE	Bidirectional	
8th Street NE / D Street NE	Bidirectional	Metrobus: C43, D24 (Eastbound only)
8th Street NE / C Street NE	Bidirectional	Metrobus: C43, D24 (Westbound only)
8th Street NE / Constitution Avenue NE	Southbound	Metrobus: C51
8th Street NE / Massachusetts Avenue NE	Northbound	Metrobus: C51
8th Street NE / East Capitol Street	Bidirectional	
8th Street SE / Independence Avenue SE	Bidirectional	
8th Street SE / D Street SE Eastern Market station	Southbound	Metrobus: C55, D10, D1X; Washington Metro:
8th Street SE / D Street SE Eastern Market station	Bidirectional	Metrobus: C55, D10, D1X; Washington Metro:
8th Street SE / E Street SE	Northbound	Metrobus: C55
8th Street SE / G Street SE	Bidirectional	Metrobus: C55
8th Street SE / L Street SE	Bidirectional	Metrobus: C11, C55
M Street SE / 8th Street SE	Northbound	Metrobus: C11, C55; MTA Maryland Bus: 315; PRTC OmniRide
M Street SE / 9th Street SE	Southbound	Metrobus: C11, C55; MTA Maryland Bus: 315, 735, 850; PRTC OmniRide
M Street SE / 10th Street SE	Northbound	Metrobus: C11; MTA Maryland Bus: 315, 735, 850; PRTC OmniRide
11th Street SE / O Street SE	Bidirectional	Metrobus: C11, C41, C51
Marion Barry Avenue SE / Martin Luther King Jr. Avenue SE	Southbound	Metrobus: C11, C15 (Southbound only), C23 (Southbound only), C31 (Westbound only), C41, C51
Marion Barry Avenue SE / 13th Street SE	Northbound	Metrobus: C11, C15 (Southbound only), C23 (Southbound only), C31 (Westbound only) C41, C51
Marion Barry Avenue SE / 14th Street SE	Bidirectional	Metrobus: C15 (Southbound only), C23 (Southbound only), C31 (Westbound only)
Marion Barry Avenue SE / 15th Street SE	Southbound	Metrobus: C15 (Northbound only), C23, C31 (Eastbound only)
Marion Barry Avenue SE / 17th Street SE	Northbound	Metrobus: C15 (Northbound only), C23, C31 (Eastbound only)
Marion Barry Avenue SE / 18th Street SE	Bidirectional	Metrobus: C23
Marion Barry Avenue SE / Marbury Plaza Apartments	Bidirectional	Metrobus: C23
Marion Barry Avenue SE / Altamont Place SE	Bidirectional	Metrobus: C23
Marion Barry Avenue SE / 25th Street SE	Bidirectional	Metrobus: C23, D10
Naylor Road SE / Marion Barry Avenue SE	Northbound	Metrobus: C21, C23, C25, C26, C27, D10
Naylor Road SE / Alabama Avenue SE	Southbound	Metrobus: C21, C23, C25, C26, C27, D10
Alabama Avenue SE / 25th Street SE	Southbound	Metrobus: C21, C25, C26, C27, D10
Alabama Avenue SE / Ainger Place SE	Bidirectional	Metrobus: C21, C25, C26, C27, D10
Alabama Avenue SE / Hartford Street SE	Bidirectional	Metrobus: C21, C25, C26, C27, D10
Alabama Avenue SE / Jasper Street SE	Northbound	Metrobus: C21, C25, C26, C27, C29, D10
Alabama Avenue SE / Irving Place SE	Southbound	Metrobus: C21, C25, C26, C27, C29, D10
Alabama Avenue SE / 24th Street SE	Bidirectional	Metrobus: C21, C25, C26, C27, C29, D10
Alabama Avenue SE / 22nd Street SE	Bidirectional	Metrobus: C21, C25, C26, C27, C29, D10
Alabama Avenue SE / Bruce Place SE	Southbound	Metrobus: C21, C25, C26, C29
Alabama Avenue SE / 18th Place SE	Bidirectional	Metrobus: C21, C25, C26, C29
Alabama Avenue SE / 18th Street SE	Northbound	Metrobus: C21, C25, C26, C29
Alabama Avenue SE / Stanton Terrace SE	Southbound	Metrobus: C21, C25, C26, C29
Alabama Avenue SE / Stanton Road SE	Bidirectional	Metrobus: C21, C25, C26, C29
Alabama Avenue SE / 15th Place SE	Bidirectional	Metrobus: C21, C29
Alabama Avenue SE / Congress Street SE	Bidirectional	Metrobus: C21
Alabama Avenue SE / 13th Street SE Congress Heights station	Bidirectional	Metrobus: C21, C27, C29; Washington Metro:
Congress Heights station Bus Bay E	Southbound terminal, Northbound station	Metrobus: C21, C27, C29; Washington Metro:

== History ==
The U Street–Garfield Line originally operated under the Capital Traction Company which operated under streetcars in the late 1800s. Route 92 operated under the Good Hope Line while 90 operated on a combination of the New Jersey Avenue, U Street, and Florida Avenue/8th Street lines. Both route 90 and 92 operated between Southeast DC and Duke Ellington Bridge via the Calvert Street Loop, Barney Circle, and Washington Union Station mainly along 8th Street, Florida Avenue, and U Street. The line would later be extended to McLean Gardens. The U Street portion would be electrified in 1892 while the Florida Avenue/8th Street portion would be electrified in 1908.

Eventually, the Good Hope Line was converted into buses on January 26, 1925 while route 90 remained operating under streetcars when the Capital Traction Company and Washington Railway & Electric Company merged and formed the Capital Transit Company. Later routes 90 and 92 were acquired by DC Transit in 1956 and converted into buses on January 28, 1962 when streetcars were shut down. Routes 90 and 92 would be acquired by WMATA on January 4, 1973.

In later years, new routes 91 and 93 were introduced as the Garfield-Owl Line to provide late night service to routes 90 and 92 from On December 28, 1991 when Anacostia station opened, route 90 was rerouted to operate to the new station while also replacing the Stanton Road Line (94) portion between Anacostia and McLean Gardens when route 94 was shorten to terminate at Anacostia station.

On December 29, 1996, short route 90 trip operating between Duke Ellington Bridge and McLean Gardens during early morning and late night hours, were replaced by an equal number of route 93 trips which was extended from Duke Ellington Bridge to McLean Gardens over the same routing.

On January 13, 2001, route 92 was extended from its Garfield terminus to the newly opened Congress Heights station replacing all Route 91 service. Loop service via 15th and Congress Place, SE, was also discontinued. Route 93 was also shifted to the U Street–Garfield Line and was extended from Shipley Terrace to Congress Heights station alongside the 92. Service was discontinued south of Alabama Avenue (Trenton Place, 19th Street and Savannah Street).

On June 24, 2007, the route was shorten from McLean Gardens to Duke Ellington Bridge in order to improve on time efficiency from the long routes the buses run along. Select rush hour buses would still end at 14th and U streets, NW however. Route 96 would replace the 90, 92, and 93 portion between McLean Gardens and Duke Ellington Bridge.

Between 2010 and 2011, WMATA and the District Department of Transportation began a study on the U Street–Garfield Line. Public meetings and surveys were contributed to passengers on how to improve the lines. Multiple passengers complained about the route being crowded, loud buses, buses behind schedule, low frequency, safety and security, shelters and stops, communication, and extending the western end of line up to Woodley Park station or McLean Gardens again. At the time of the study, routes 90, 92, and 93 were operating out of Southern Avenue division which utilizes Flxibles, D40LFRs, DE40LFAs, and Orion Vs.

On June 22, 2014, all route 92 trips were shorten from Duke Ellington Bridge to U and 14th Streets, NW terminus (U Street station) and all Route 92 southbound service begins at U & 13th Streets, NW (U Street station, 13th Street NW entrance). Service between U Street station and Duke Ellington Bridge is still provided by routes 90 and 93.

In 2015, WMATA proposed to eliminate all route 93 service due to low ridership along Stanton, Pomeroy, and Morris Roads and to simplify the line. Alternative service would be provided by routes 90, 92, and 94.

On March 27, 2016, all route 93 service was discontinued and replaced by routes 90, 92, and 94 running on the same routing. Additional early morning and late evening 90 and 92 trips were added as a result.

On June 24, 2018, additional route 92 trips were added to operate between Congress Heights station and Eastern Market station.

During the COVID-19 pandemic, routes 90 and 92 were reduced to operate on its Saturday supplemental schedule beginning on March 16, 2020. However beginning on March 18, 2020, the line was further reduced to operate on its Sunday schedule. On March 21, 2020, all route 92 weekend service was suspended and route 90 was relegated to operate every 30 minutes. Route 92 weekend service and all full service was restored on August 23, 2020.

In 2020, WMATA proposed to eliminate the 92 short trips between Congress Heights and Eastern Market stations as there is alternative service on each stop and at the request of the District Department of Transportation.

In February 2021 during WMATA's FY2022 budget crisis, WMATA proposed to increase span to add late-night service to 2:00 AM on Route 92 between July and December 2021 in the first half of the fiscal year, but would reduce it back to midnight between January to June 2022 in the second half of the fiscal year. Subsequently on April 22, 2021, WMATA approved the FY2022 budget and received federal funding to avoid service cuts.

On June 6, 2021, late-night service was increased to operate up to 2:00 AM on Route 92.

On June 10, 2021, WMATA proposed to increase the line to operate every 12 minutes daily between 7:00 AM to 9:00 PM daily as part of WMATA's Pandemic Recovery Plan.

On September 5, 2021, the line was increased to operate every 12 minutes daily between 7 AM and 9 PM.

Due to rising cases of the COVID-19 Omicron variant, the line was reduced to its Saturday service on weekdays. Full weekday service resumed on February 7, 2022.

On December 17, 2023, new 24 hour service was added to Route 92, operating every 20 minutes with these late night trips extended from U Street to Duke Ellington Bridge.

=== Better Bus Redesign ===
In 2022, WMATA launched its Better Bus Redesign project, which aimed to redesign the entire Metrobus Network and is the first full redesign of the agency's bus network in its history.

In April 2023, WMATA launched its Draft Visionary Network. As part of the drafts, WMATA proposed to combine both Routes 90 and 92 into one route, operating on the 92 routing between Duke Ellington Bridge and Congress Heights station as Route DC109. Route 90 service to Anacostia station would be combined with Route 96, operating on the current 90 routing between Anacostia staion and the intersection of 8th Street SE & Massachusetts Street SE, then would operate to Duke Ellington Bridge via Route 96's current routing from the intersection of 8th Street SE & Massachusetts Street SE to Duke Ellington Bridge as Route DC108

During WMATA's Revised Draft Visionary Network, WMATA renamed the DC109 to the C53 and kept the same routing. WMATA also renamed the DC108 to the C51 and extended the Route from Duke Ellington Bridge to Woodley Park station. WMATA also modified the C51 to no longer operate to Union station or along Massachusetts Avenue, and turn onto H Street NE from New Jersey Avenue NW, then turn onto 8th Street NE before operating to Anacostia station. All changes were then proposed during WMATA's 2025 Proposed Network.

During the proposals, WMATA extended the C51 from Duke Ellington Bridge to Tenleytown-AU station, taking over the proposed Route C55 routing, and rerouted the C51 along Massachusetts Avenue NE to Washington Union Station, and operate via Massachusetts Avenue NE, 17th Street SE, Potomac Avenue SE, Potomac Avenue station, 11th Street SE, and Martin Luther King Jr Avenue SE. Route C53 was also extended from Duke Ellington Bridge to Woodley Park station, taking over the original C51 routing. Late night service would still end at Duke Ellington Bridge.

On November 21, 2024, WMATA approved its Better Bus Redesign Network.

Beginning on June 29, 2025, Route 92 was extended to Woodley Park station and was renamed into the C53. Route 90 was partially combined with Route 96 between Anacostia and 11th Street SE, then following Potomac Avenue SE, then following the 96 routing to Tenleytown–AU station as Route C51.

== Incidents ==
- On August 30, 2017, a woman attempted to abduct a seven-year-old boy who was riding to school on board a route 92 bus near 8th and H streets. The suspect would flee the scene after other passengers stopped her. The woman, later identified as Thalia Denise Brown was later arrested on September 14, 2017.
- On October 5, 2018, a route 92 bus and van collided with each other along 22nd Street and Alabama Avenue sending 9 people to the hospital.
