= U Street–Anacostia Line =

Daily bus route in Washington D.C., USA

C51
- U Street–Anacostia Line

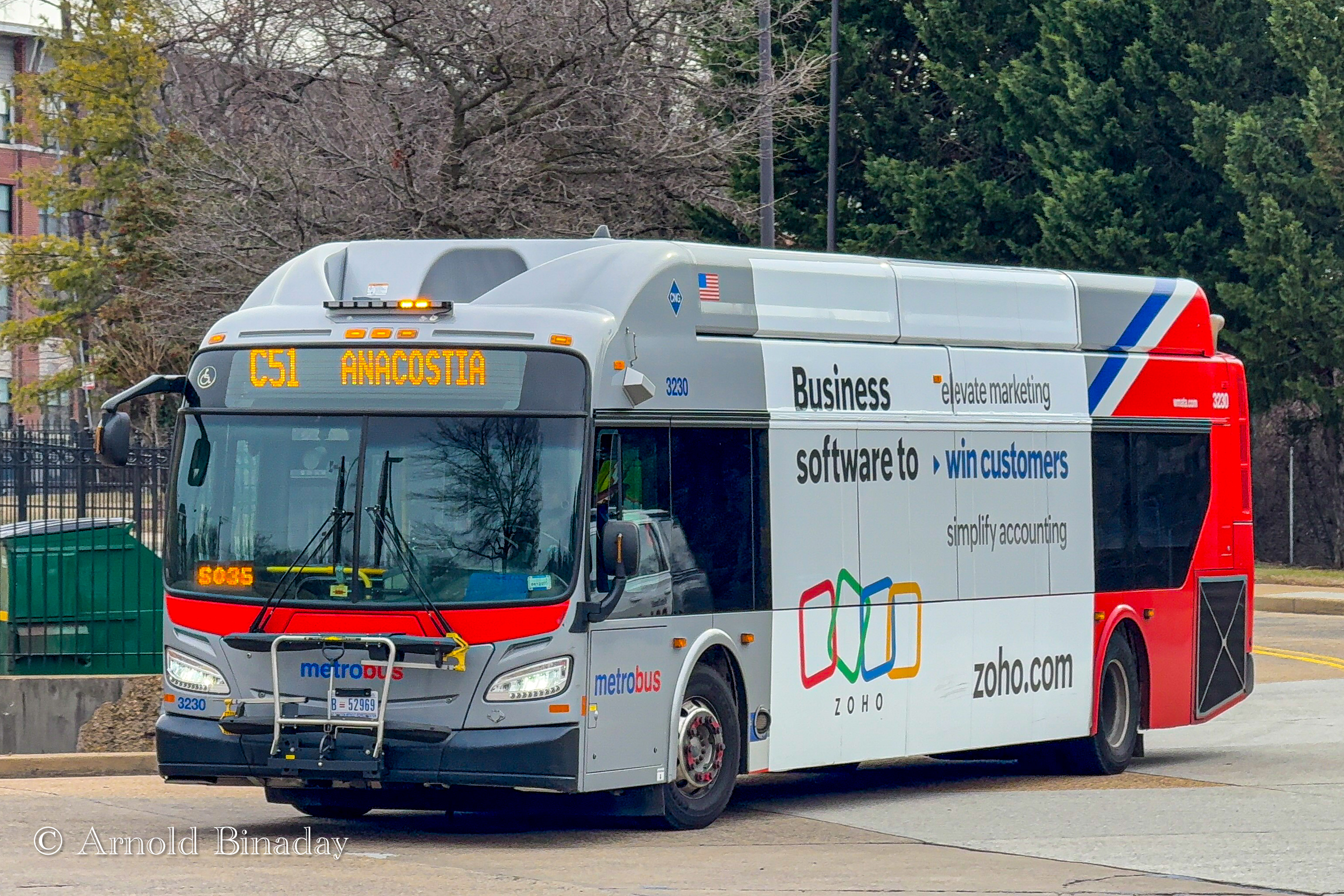
- Route C51 at Anacostia station

Overview
- System: Metrobus
- Operator: Washington Metropolitan Area Transit Authority
- Garage: Shepherd Parkway
- Livery: Local
- Status: In Service
- Began service: 1922 as a streetcar route C51: June 29, 2025
- Ended service: 96: June 29, 2025
- Predecessors: 40, 42, and 44

Route
- Locale: Northwest, Northeast, Southeast
- Communities served: Tenleytown, Cathedral Heights, McLean Gardens, Cleveland Park, Woodley Park, Adams Morgan, Lanier Heights, Cardozo, LeDroit Park, Truxton Circle, Capitol Hill, Stanton Park, Kingman Park, Hill East, Navy Yard, Anacostia
- Landmarks served: Anacostia station, Potomac Avenue station, Stadium-Armory station, Washington Union Station, Union Station, Howard University Hospital, U Street station, Reeves Center, Adams Morgan, Duke Ellington Bridge, Woodley Park station, Washington National Cathedral, Tenleytown station
- Start: Tenleytown station
- Via: Potomac Avenue SE, Massachusetts Avenue SE/NE, New Jersey Avenue NW, U Street NW, Wisconsin Avenue NW
- End: Anacostia station
- Length: 80 minutes
- Other routes: C53

Service
- Level: Daily
- Frequency: 20 minutes
- Operates: Mon-Fri: 4:30 AM - 12:05 AM; Sat: 4:30 AM - 1:00 AM; Sun: 5:00 AM - 12:45 AM
- Ridership: 96: 1,518,093 (FY 2025)
- Transfers: SmarTrip only
- Timetable: U Street–Anacostia Line

The U Street–Anacostia Line, designated Route C51, is a daily bus route operated by the Washington Metropolitan Area Transit Authority between Tenleytown station of the Red Line of the Washington Metro and Anacostia station of the Green Line of the Washington Metro. This route replaced former route 96 on the East Capitol Street–Cardozo Line on June 29, 2025. The line operates every 20 minutes at all times and trips take roughly 80 minutes to complete.

== Background ==
The line provides daily service through Downtown Washington DC via Potomac Avenue, Massachusetts Avenue, New Jersey Avenue, U Street, Woodley Road, and Wisconsin Avenue.

Route C51 operates out of the Shepherd Parkway division.

=== Stops ===
Bus stop	Direction	Connections
Washington, D.C.
Fort Drive NW / Albemarle Street NW Tenleytown-AU	Southbound stop, Northbound terminal	Metrobus: C61, C81, C85, C87, D80, D82, D90; AU Shuttle; Washington Metro:
Wisconsin Avenue NW / Albemarle Street NW Tenleytown-AU	Southbound	Metrobus: C61, C81, C85, C87, D80, D82; AU Shuttle; Washington Metro:
Wisconsin Avenue NW / Tenley Circle NW	Southbound	Metrobus: C81, C85, C87, D80, D82
Wisconsin Avenue NW / Veazey Street NW	Northbound	Metrobus: C85, C87, D80, D82
Wisconsin Avenue NW / Van Ness Street NW	Southbound	Metrobus: C61, C85, D80, D82
Wisconsin Avenue NW / Upton Street NW	Bidirectional	Metrobus: C61, C85, D80, D82
Wisconsin Avenue NW / Rodman Street NW	Bidirectional	Metrobus: C61, C85, D80, D82
Wisconsin Avenue NW / Porter Street NW	Bidirectional	Metrobus: C61, C85, D80, D82
Wisconsin Avenue NW / Newark Street NW	Bidirectional	Metrobus: C85, D80, D82
Woodley Road NW / Wisconsin Avenue NW	Bidirectional	Metrobus: C85, D80, D82
Woodley Road NW / 35th Street NW	Bidirectional	
Woodley Road NW / 34th Street NW	Bidirectional	
Woodley Road NW / 32nd Street NW	Bidirectional	
Cathedral Avenue NW / Woodley Road NW	Bidirectional	
Cathedral Avenue NW / 29th Street NW	Northbound	
29th Street NW / Cathedral Avenue NW	Southbound	
29th Street NW / Woodley Road NW	Northbound	
29th Street NW / Garfield Street NW	Southbound	
Calvert Street NW / 29th Street NW	Northbound	
Calvert Street NW / McGill Terrace NW	Southbound	
Calvert Street NW / Shoreham Drive NW Woodley Park	Southbound	Metrobus: C53, D70; Washington Metro:
Calvert Street NW / Connecticut Avenue NW Woodley Park	Bidirectional	Metrobus: C53, D70; Washington Metro:
Calvert Street NW / Biltmore Street NW	Bidirectional	Metrobus: C53
Calvert Street NW / Lanier Place NW	Southbound	Metrobus: C53
Adams Mill Road NW / Columbia Road NW	Northbound	Metrobus: C53, D72, D74
18th Street NW / Columbia Road NW	Southbound	Metrobus: C53, D72, D74
18th Street NW / Belmont Road NW	Bidirectional	Metrobus: C53
18th Street NW / California Street NW	Bidirectional	Metrobus: C53
U Street NW / Florida Avenue NW	Northbound	Metrobus: C53
U Street NW / New Hampshire Avenue NW	Bidirectional	Metrobus: C53, D60, D6X
U Street NW / 14th Street NW	Bidirectional	Metrobus: C53, D50, D5X
U Street NW / 13th Street NW U Street	Bidirectional	Metrobus: C53; Washington Metro:
U Street NW / Vermont Avenue NW U Street	Bidirectional	Metrobus: C53, C57, D44; Washington Metro:
U Street NW / 9th Street NW	Southbound	Metrobus: C53, C57
Florida Avenue NW / 7th Street NW	Southbound	Metrobus: C53, C57, D40, D4X
Florida Avenue NW / Georgia Avenue NW	Northbound	Metrobus: C53, C57, D40, D4X
Florida Avenue NW / 6th Street NW	Bidirectional	Metrobus: C53, C57
New Jersey Avenue NW / Florida Avenue NW	Northbound	Metrobus: C53, C57
New Jersey Avenue NW / Rhode Island Avenue NW	Bidirectional	Metrobus: D32
New Jersey Avenue NW / P Street NW	Bidirectional	Metrobus: C91
New Jersey Avenue NW / N Street NW	Bidirectional	
New Jersey Avenue NW / M Street NW	Northbound	Metrobus: D34
New Jersey Avenue NW / Pierce Street NW	Bidirectional	Metrobus: D34
New Jersey Avenue NW / K Street NW	Bidirectional	Metrobus: D36
New Jersey Avenue NW / H Street NW	Bidirectional	Metrobus: D20
Massachusetts Avenue NW / G Street NW	Bidirectional	Metrobus: D80
Massachusetts Avenue NE / First Street NE	Bidirectional	Amtrak, VRE, MARC at Union Station; Metrobus: C43, C55, C71, D20, D2X, D24, D30, D80; MTA Maryland Bus: 903, 922; Loudoun County Transit; PRTC OmniRide; Washington Metro: at Union Station
Massachusetts Avenue NE / Delaware Avenue NE	Southbound	Metrobus: C43, C55, D24
Massachusetts Avenue NE / Columbus Circle NE	Northbound	Metrobus: C43, C55, D24
Massachusetts Avenue NE / 2nd Street NE	Southbound	Metrobus: C43, C55, D24
Massachusetts Avenue NE / 3rd Street NE	Northbound	Metrobus: C43, C55, D24
Massachusetts Avenue NE / 4th Street NE	Southbound	Metrobus: C43, C55, D24
C Street NE / 4th Street NE	Northbound	Metrobus: C43, C55, D24
Massachusetts Avenue NE / Constitution Avenue NE	Southbound	Metrobus: C53
Massachusetts Avenue NE / 8th Street NE	Northbound	Metrobus: C53
East Capitol Street SE / Kentucky Avenue SE	Southbound	
East Capitol Street NE / Tennessee Avenue NE	Northbound	
Massachusetts Avenue SE / 13th Street SE	Bidirectional	
Massachusetts Avenue SE / 14th Street SE	Southbound	
Massachusetts Avenue SE / Independence Avenue SE	Northbound	
Massachusetts Avenue SE / 15th Street SE	Southbound	
Massachusetts Avenue SE / 17th Street SE	Northbound	Metrobus: C41, D24; Washington Metro: at Stadium-Armory station
17th Street SE / C Street SE	Southbound	Metrobus: C41, D24; Washington Metro: at Stadium-Armory station
17th Street SE / D Street SE	Southbound	Metrobus: C41
Potomac Avenue SE / 18th Street SE	Northbound	Metrobus: C41
Potomac Avenue SE / Kentucky Avenue SE	Southbound	Metrobus: C41
Potomac Avenue SE / 15th Street SE	Northbound	Metrobus: C41
Potomac Avenue SE / 14th Street SE Potomac Avenue	Bidirectional	Metrobus: C15, C37, C41, D10, D1X; Washington Metro:
Potomac Avenue SE / 13th Street SE	Northbound	Metrobus: C41
I Street SE / 13th Street SE	Southbound	Metrobus: C41
K Street SE / Kentucky Avenue SE	Northbound	Metrobus: C41
11th Street SE / M Street SE	Northbound	Metrobus: C11, C41, C53
11th Street SE / O Street SE	Bidirectional	Metrobus: C11, C41, C53
Martin Luther King Jr. Avenue SE / Marion Barry Avenue SE	Northbound	Metrobus: C11, C15 (Southbound only), C23 (Southbound only), C31 (Westbound only), C41
Martin Luther King Jr. Avenue SE / U Street SE	Southbound	Metrobus: C11, C15 (Southbound only), C23 (Southbound only), C31 (Westbound only), C41
Martin Luther King Jr. Avenue SE / W Street SE	Bidirectional	Metrobus: C11, C15, C23, C31, C41, C51
Martin Luther King Jr. Avenue SE / Talbert Street SE	Bidirectional	Metrobus: C11, C15, C23, C29, C31, C41, C51
Anacostia Bus Bay E	Northbound stop, Southbound terminal	Metrobus: C11, C13, C15, C17, C21, C23, C25, C26, C29, C31, C41; Washington Metro:

== History ==
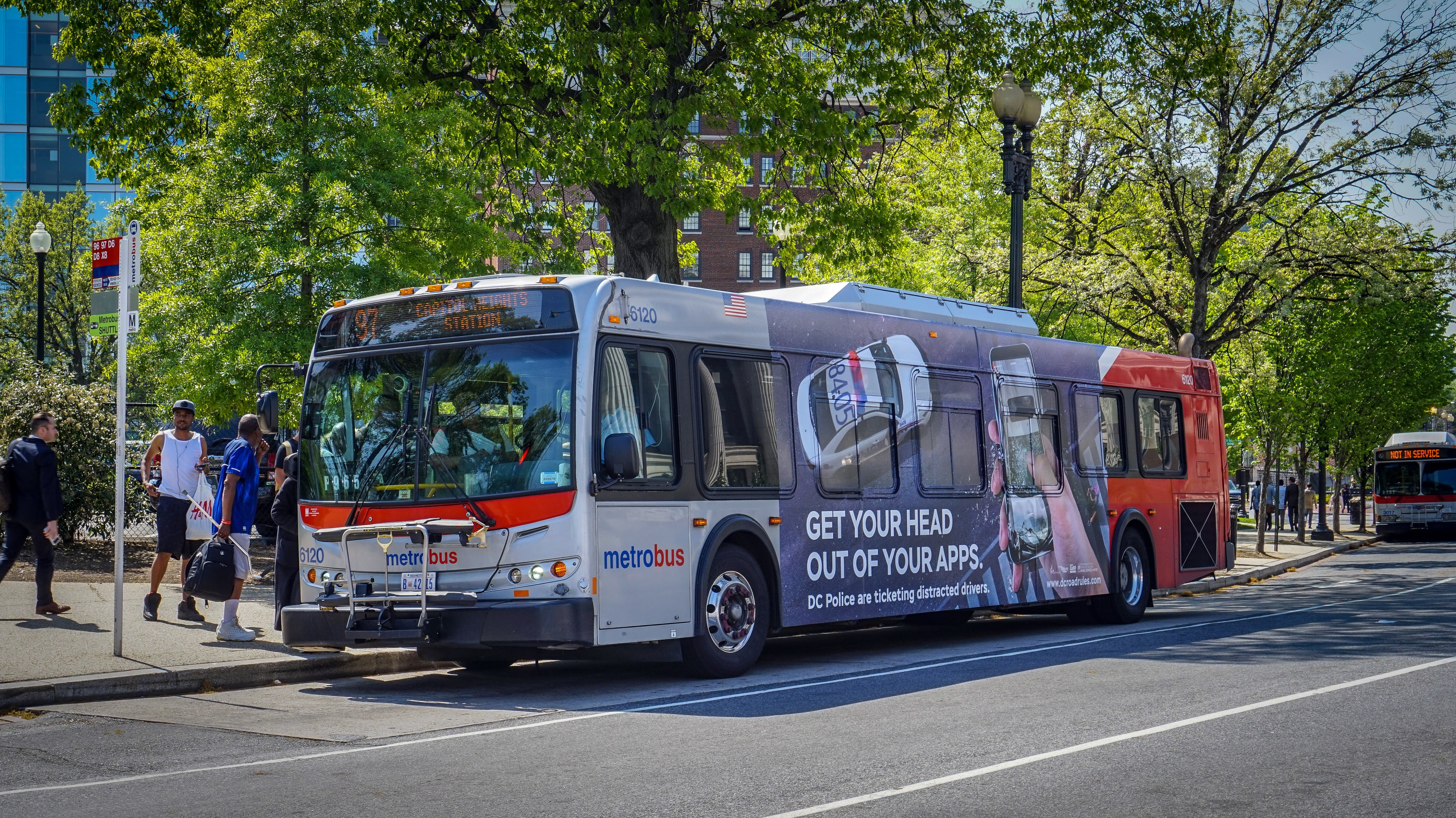
Former Route 97 at Washington Union Station

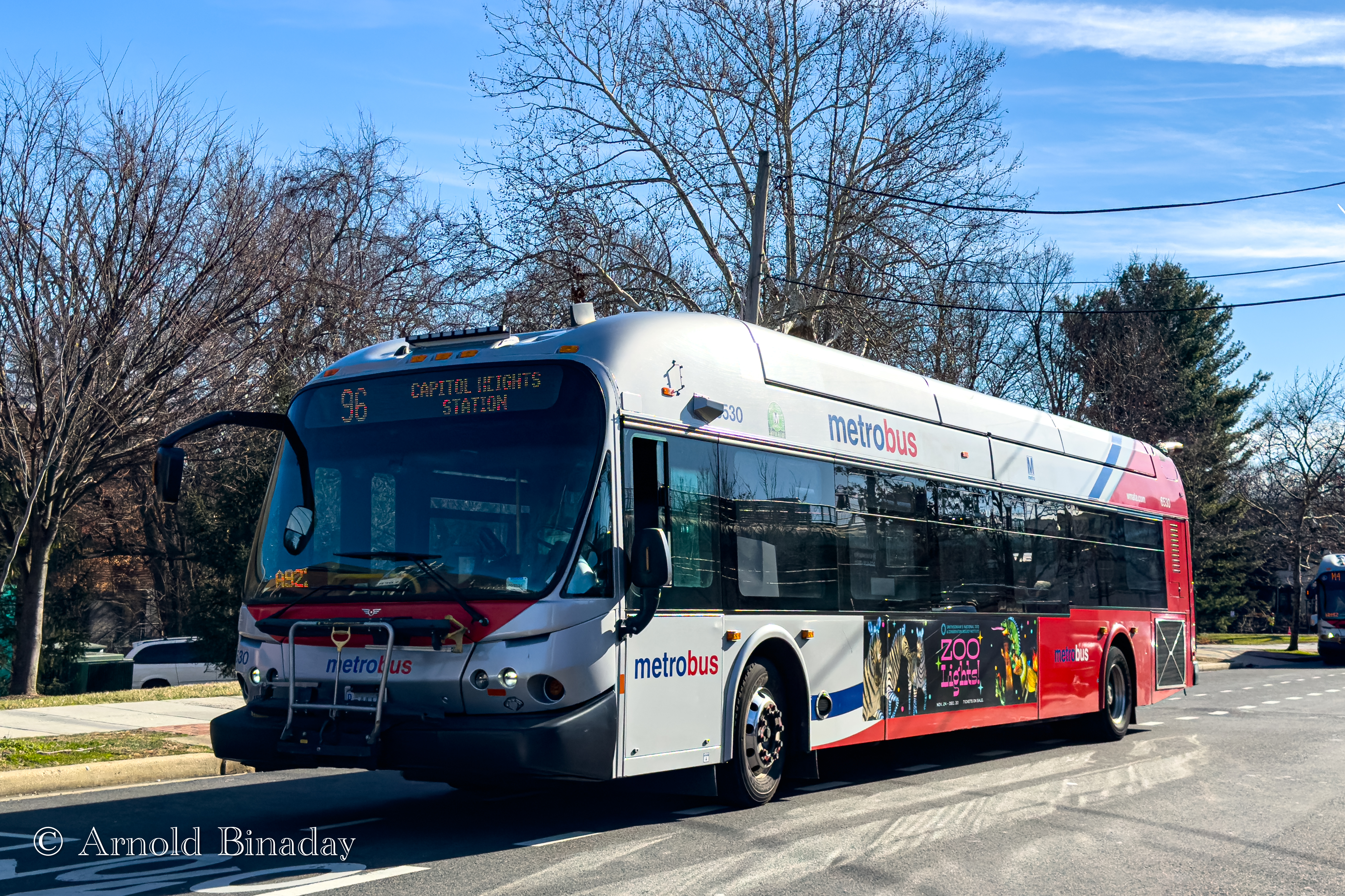
Former Route 96 at Tenleytown station

Route 96 originally operated as part of the East-Capitol Hill Streetcar Line under the Washington Railway & Electric Company, which began service in 1922. The line originally as Woodley via 29th but was later replaced. Route 96 operated between Duke Ellington Bridge in Northwest and the Capitol Building. The line would operate along Calvert Street, 18th Street, U Street, Florida Avenue, New Jersey Avenue, North Capitol Street, Louisiana Avenue, and Constitution Avenue.

The line was later acquired by the Capital Traction Company and replaced by buses in 1962 operating under DC Transit. WMATA later acquired DC Transit and three other private bus companies that operated throughout the Washington Metropolitan Area and merged them all together to form its own, Metrobus System on February 4, 1973.

On March 27, 1976, 96 was rerouted from the Capitol Building, and instead terminate at the Washington Union Station. Service along Constitution Avenue was discontinued.

On May 11, 1991, when the U Street station opened, route 96 began serving the newly opened U Street in the middle of its route. No route changes were made during this particular time.

In March 1995, when Routes 40 and 44 were both discontinued, and Route 42 was shorten to operate between Mount Pleasant and Metro Center, Route 96 was extended from Washington Union Station to operate to Capitol Heights station, via Stadium–Armory station, District of Columbia General Hospital, and Benning Road station. Route 96 will terminate at Stadium Armory during the weekday peak-hours only. The new routing helped out Route D6 and provided additional service between Union Station and Stadium Armory. Route 96 will mainly operate along Massachusetts Avenue and East Capitol Street.

A new route 97 was introduced to operate alongside the 96, except only operating between Union Station and Capitol Heights during the weekday peak-hours along East Capitol Street. Route 97 would operate on a different pathway between Stadium Armory and Union station mostly remaining along East Capitol Street, and turned on 1st Street, Constitution Avenue, and Louisiana Avenue. Route 96 would operate along Massachusetts Avenue to Union station. The new route would directly serve Stadium–Armory while operating both directions, but 96 would only directly serve Stadium–Armory eastbound only. Passengers wishing to board/alight on the 96, were required to do so at DC General Hospital. Also, the 97 would not serve DC General Hospital. As a result of the changes, the line was renamed the East Capitol Street–Cardozo Line.

On June 24, 2007, the 96 was extended from Duke Ellington Bridge, to McLean Gardens, operating on Calvert Street past Duke Ellington Bridge, then operating via 29th Street NW, Cathedral Avenue NW, Woodley Road NW, Wisconsin Avenue NW, Idaho Avenue NW, and Newark Street NW, in order to replace the segment of Routes 90, 92, 93 between Duke Ellington Bridge and McLean Gardens. The changes were to improve on-time performance for routes 90, 92, and 93.

On September 30, 2012, route 96 along with route X3 was extended from McLean Gardens to Tenleytown-AU station adding additional service along Wisconsin Avenue NW from McLean Gardens due to a long-term detour route to accommodate construction of Cathedral Commons in 2012.

In 2014, WMATA proposed to shorten the 96 back at Duke Ellington Bridge and reroute the line along Massachusetts Avenue NE between 11th & East Capitol Streets and Washington Union Station instead of via 1st Street and Louisiana Avenue NW. A new route 98 would replace the 96 routing between Tenleytown-AU station and U Street station for the following reasons:

- Improve reliability of service by operating shorter routes.
- Provide direct peak period service between Capitol Heights and Duke Ellington Bridge.
- Provide a faster more direct routing around the U.S. Capitol.
- Create a better balance of capacity and demand throughout the entire line.

On June 21, 2015, WMATA rerouted the 96 along Massachusetts Avenue between East Capitol Street and 1st Street NE and directly serving Station Park in order to improve reliability of service. Route 97 was unaffected from the changes.

In 2017, WMATA proposed to eliminate 96's segment between McLean Gardens and Tenleytown-AU station as it operates parallel with the 30N, 30S, 31, 33, 37, and H3, H4. The line would terminate back at Cathedral Commons which was its pre-2012 extension. Under the proposal, the turnaround would include one of the following:

- Option 1: From northbound Wisconsin Avenue, left on Newark Street to terminal stand on the north side of Newark Street, midblock between Wisconsin and Idaho Avenues NW. Departing the terminal, buses would proceed west on Newark Street, right on Idaho Avenue, right on Wisconsin Avenue NW and resume the current eastbound route.
- Option 2: From northbound Wisconsin Avenue, left on Newark Street, left on Idaho Avenue NW to terminal stand midblock on the west side of Idaho Avenue, between Newark and Macomb Streets NW. Departing the terminal, buses would proceed south on Idaho Avenue, left on Macomb Street, right on Wisconsin Avenue NW and resume the current eastbound route.
- Option 3: From northbound Wisconsin Avenue, left on Porter Street, left on 38th Street, left on Newark Street NW to terminal stand at Idaho Avenue. Departing the terminal, buses would continue east on Newark Street, right on Wisconsin Avenue NW and resume the current eastbound route. This routing was similar prior to the 2012 extension.

Performance measures for route 96 goes as follows according to WMATA:

Performance Measure	Route 96	WMATA Guideline	Pass/Fail
Average Weekday Riders	4,582	432	Pass
Cost Recovery	18%	16.6%	Pass
Subsidy per Rider	$3.62	$4.81	Pass
Riders per Trip	29	10.7	Pass
Riders per Revenue Mile	3.0	1.3	Pass

Average Riders per Trip (Route Segment Proposed For Elimination)
	Westbound	Eastbound
Weekday	8.1	8.6
Saturday	5.1	5.7
Sunday	4.2	4.7

On-Time Performance
Weekday	62.4%
Saturday	55.9%
Sunday	71.6%

During the COVID-19 pandemic, route 96 was reduced to operate on its Saturday schedule and all route 97 service was suspended beginning on March 16, 2020. However on March 18, 2020, the line was further reduced to operate on its Sunday schedule. All 96 weekend service was also suspended beginning on March 21, 2020. Additional service was added on route 96 on August 23, 2020 however route 97 remained suspended.

On September 26, 2020, WMATA proposed to eliminate all route 97 service and replace them with route 96 trips that will operate the full route between Tenleytown station and Capitol Heights station. This was due to low federal funding.

On November 13, 2020, eastbound route 96 trips was changed to operate along New Jersey Avenue NW between 3rd Street and Massachusetts Avenue upon completion of construction on New Jersey Avenue. Service along New York Avenue NW, M Street NW and North Capitol Street NW was discontinued.

In February 2021 due to low federal funding, WMATA proposed to modify the 96 by operating between Union Station and Deanwood station combining portions of the U5, U6, V1, V7, V8, and W4. The line would operate its current routing between Union Station and East Capitol Street & Minnesota Avenue, then it will operate along Ridge Road, Texas Avenue, E Street, Alabama Avenue, H Street/Hanna Place, Benning Road, G Street, Fitch Place, 53rd Street (northbound)/51st Street (southbound), Central Avenue, East Capitol Street, Division Avenue, Eastern Avenue and Minnesota Avenue to Deanwood station serving the Benning Heights neighborhood. Route 97, and all Route 96 service west of Union station and service to Capitol Heights station would be eliminated. Subsequently on April 22, 2021, WMATA approved the FY2022 budget and received federal funding to avoid service cuts.

By September 5, 2021, all suspended routes, including Route 97 were no longer listed on WMATA's website.

Due to rising cases of the COVID-19 Omicron variant, the line was reduced to its Saturday service on weekdays. Full weekday service resumed on February 7, 2022.

In 2024 during WMATA's FY2024 Budget crisis, WMATA proposed to eliminate all Route 96 service. However on April 25, 2024, Metro’s Board of Directors approved a $4.8 billion capital and operating budget which avoided service cuts.

=== Better Bus Redesign ===
In 2022, WMATA launched its Better Bus Redesign project, which aimed to redesign the entire Metrobus Network and is the first full redesign of the agency's bus network in its history.

In April 2023, WMATA launched its Draft Visionary Network. As part of the drafts, WMATA proposed to reroute the 96 to Anacostia station, having the current 96 routing between Duke Ellington Bridge and the intersection of Massachusetts Avenue & 8th Street SE, then would operate along 8th Street SE, Eastern Market station, M Street SE, 11th Street SE, and Martin Luther King Jr Avenue SE to Anacostia station as Route DC108. Service between Massachusetts Avenue & 8th Street SE and Capitol Heights station was replaced by two proposed routes. Route DC115 would partially operate along the 96 routing between Washington Union Station and Deanwood station via Stadium–Armory station, East Capitol Street SE, Division Avenue NE, and Eastern Avenue NE. Route DC213 would also partially operate along the 96 routing between Capitol Heights station and Benning Road station, then would operate to Woodley Park station via Benning Road NE, Florida Avenue NE, U Street NW, 18th Street NW, and Calvert Street NW. Service between Duke Ellington Bridge and Tenleytown–AU station was discontinued without any replacement service along Calvert Street, 29th Street NW, Cathedral Avenue, and Woodly Road.

During WMATA's Revised Draft Visionary Network, WMATA renamed the DC108 to Route C51 and modified it to no longer operate to Union station or along Massachusetts Avenue, and turn onto H Street NE from New Jersey Avenue NW, then turn onto 8th Street NE before operating the proposed routing to Anacostia station. Route DC213 was split into Routes C55 and C57. Route C55 would operate on the 96 routing between Tenleytown–AU station and Duke Ellington Bridge, then operate to LeDroit Park via U Street NW, Florida Avenue NW, Rhode Island Avenue NW, 1st Street NW, Bryant Street NW, and W Street NW. Route C57 would operate the current proposed route between Capitol Heights station and U Street station. Route DC115 would also be renamed to Route D24 and would be combined with the D6, operating between McPherson Square station and Deanwood station. All changes were then proposed during WMATA's 2025 Proposed Network.

During the proposals, the Route C55 portion between Tenleytown-AU station and Duke Ellington Bridge was combined with the full Route C51 routing. The C51 would also restore service along Massachusetts Avenue NE and to Union station, while no longer operating along H Street NE or 8th Street NE, instead operating to Anacostia station via Massachusetts Avenue NE, 17th Street SE, Potomac Avenue SE, Potomac Avenue station, 11th Street SE, and Martin Luther King Jr Avenue SE. The C57 was also downgraded to operate during the weekday peak hours only. C55 service between U Street and LeDroit Park was instead shelved in the proposals and the former C55 designation was given to the proposed Route D12 (Route 74) proposal.

On November 21, 2024, WMATA approved its Better Bus Redesign Network.

Beginning on June 29, 2025, Route 96 was changed to serve Anacostia station instead of Capitol Heights station partially combining the route with Route 90, having the routing remain the same between Tenleytown station and the intersection of Massachusetts Avenue NE & 18th Street NE, then would operate to Anacostia via 17th Street SE, Potomac Avenue SE, Potomac Avenue station, 11th Street SE, and Martin Luther King Jr Avenue SE, being renamed to Route C51. Service between Capitol Heights station and Benning Road station was replaced by Route C57 during the weekday peak hours only, operating via Benning Road NE and Florida Avenue NW to U Street station. Service between Stadium–Armory station and Benning Road station was replaced by Route D24, which operates between McPherson Square station and Deanwood station.
