= Pennsylvania Avenue Line (Washington, D.C.) =

Daily Metrobus route in Washington, D.C., United States

D10, D1X
- Pennsylvania Avenue; Pennsylvania Avenue Limited

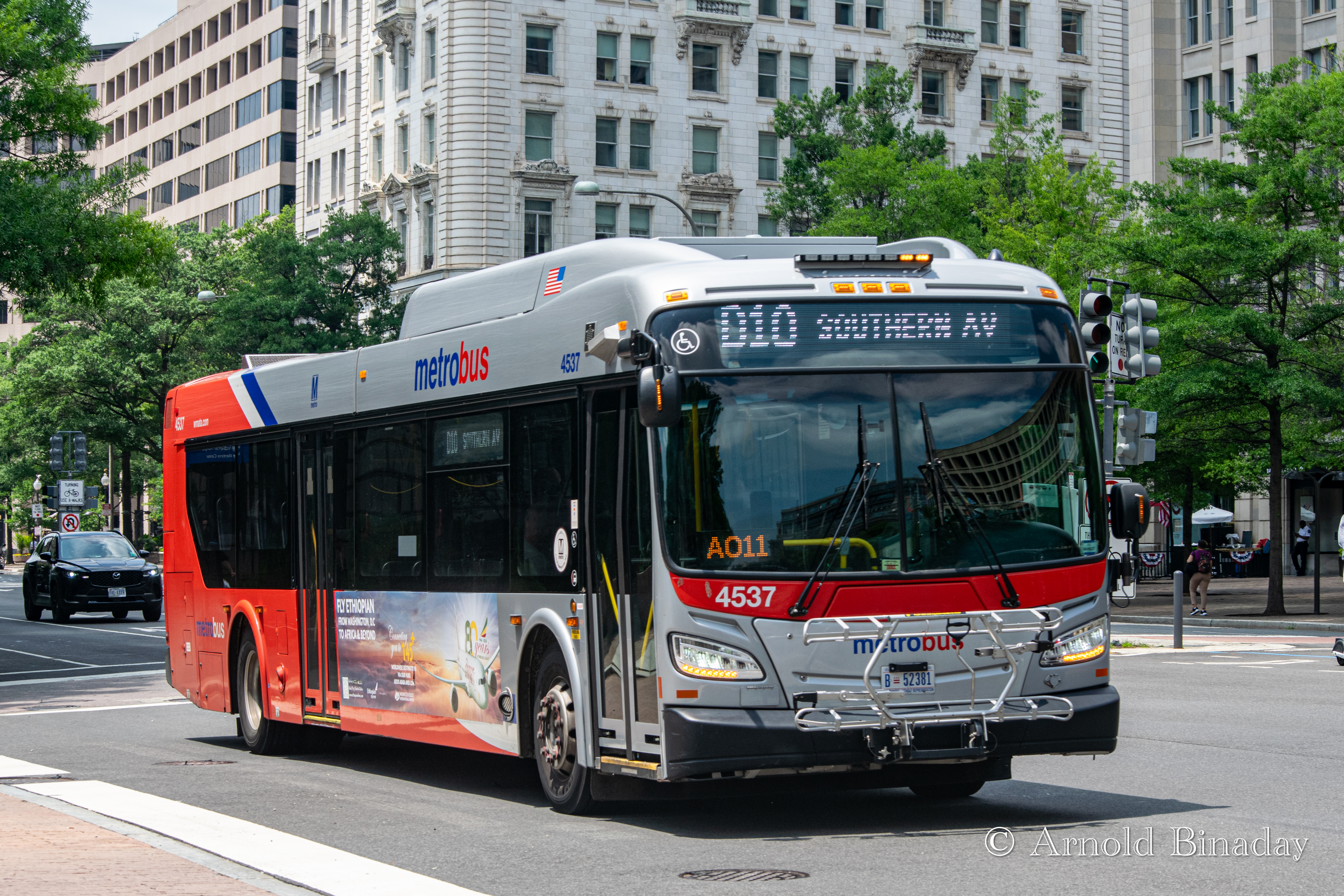
- Route D10 along Pennsylvania Avenue NW

Overview
- System: Metrobus
- Operator: Washington Metropolitan Area Transit Authority
- Garage: Andrews Federal Center; Shepherd Parkway
- Status: In Service
- Began service: July 29, 1862 (streetcar); 1936 (bus)
- Predecessors: Washington and Georgetown Railroad, Routes 30, 32, 34, 35 and 36

Route
- Locale: Prince George's County, Southeast, Southwest, Northwest
- Communities served: Foggy Bottom, Federal Triangle, Capitol Hill, Downtown, Barney Circle, Fairlawn, Good Hope, Naylor Gardens, Hillcrest, Skyland, Temple Hills
- Landmarks served: Kennedy Center (D10), George Washington University Hospital (D10), Foggy Bottom station (D10), Farragut West station (D10), Farragut North station (D10), White House (D10), McPherson Square station (D10), Metro Center station (D10), Federal Triangle station, Archives station, National Mall, U.S. Capitol, Federal Center SW station, Capitol South station, Eastern Market station, Potomac Avenue station, L’Enfant Square, Skyland (D10), Hillcrest (D1X), Southern Avenue station (D10), Naylor Road station (D1X)
- Start: D10: Kennedy Center; Foggy Bottom station (Late nights); D1X: Federal Triangle
- Via: New Hampshire Avenue NW (D10), H Street / I Street NW (D10), Pennsylvania Avenue NW/SE, Naylor Road SE, Alabama Avenue SE (D10), Branch Avenue SE (D1X)
- End: D10: Southern Avenue station D1X: Naylor Road station
- Other routes: D80, D82

Service
- Level: Daily
- Frequency: 12 - 20 minutes (6 AM - 9 PM); 20 - 30 minutes (After 9 PM)
- Operates: D10: 24 Hours; D1X: 5:00 AM - 2:15 AM
- Ridership: 1,784,939 (32, FY 2025); 1,116,084 (36, FY 2025)
- Transfers: SmarTrip only
- Timetable: Pennsylvania Avenue Line; Pennsylvania Avenue Limited

The Pennsylvania Avenue Line, designated as Pennsylvania Avenue on Route D10, and Pennsylvania Avenue Limited on Route D1X, are daily Metrobus routes in Washington, D.C., Operating between the Southern Avenue station (D10) or Naylor Road station (D1X) of the Green Line of the Washington Metro and the Kennedy Center (D10) or Federal Triangle (D1X). Late night D10 trips are truncated to Foggy Bottom station of the Blue, Orange and Silver Lines of the Washington Metro. Until the 1960s, it was a streetcar line, opened in 1862 by the Washington and Georgetown Railroad as the first line in the city.

The routing also incorporated portions of the Naylor Road Line, formerly a standalone route.

== Current route ==
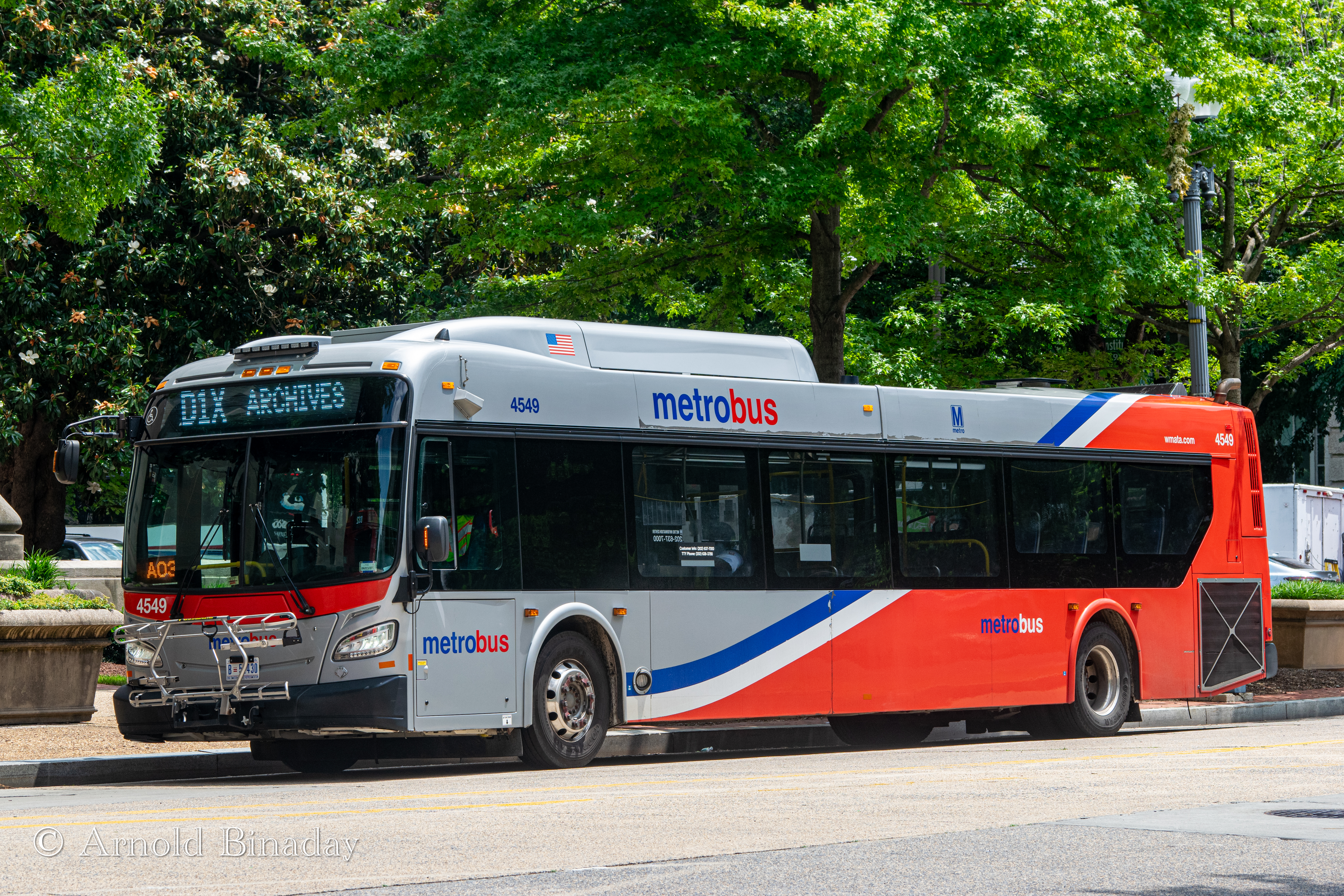
Route D1X at Federal Triangle

Route D10 begins at the Kennedy Center near the Foggy Bottom–GWU station and follows H and I Streets to Pennsylvania Avenue. Route D1X starts at Federal Triangle and follows 7th Street NW, and Independence Avenue SW, with both routes meeting at the intersection of Independence Avenue and 4th Street Southwest. Both buses routes travel across Southeast and over the Sousa Bridge. At L'Enfant Square, both routes separate. Route D10 travels along 25th Street, Naylor Road and Alabama Avenue, while Route D1X continues along Pennsylvania Avenue to Branch Avenue. Route D10 terminates at the Southern Avenue station, just across the Maryland border, while Route D1X terminates at Naylor Road station, also in Maryland. Both stations are served by the Green Line.

Routes D10 and D1X operate seven days a week. Both routes are supplemented by the Wisconsin Avenue Line, operated by Routes D80 and D82, which traverse the same route as the D10 and D1X, but continue north along Wisconsin Avenue to Friendship Heights station.

Both lines operate out of Andrews Federal Center division with late night trips operating out of Shepherd Parkway division. Prior to being moved to Andrews, both lines operated out of Bladensburg, Shepherd Parkway, and Western division at some point.

=== Route D10 stops ===
| Bus stop | Direction | Connections |
Washington, D.C.
| Kennedy Center Roadway / Kennedy Center | Eastbound stop, Westbound terminal | |
| 25th Street NW / F Street NW | Eastbound | |
| New Hampshire Avenue NW / Virginia Avenue NW | Westbound | |
| New Hampshire Avenue NW / 24th Street NW Foggy Bottom | Bidirectional; Eastbound stop, Westbound terminal (Late night only) | Metrobus: A58, C85, D20, D74, D80, D82; Washington Metro: |
| Pennsylvania Avenue NW / 22nd Street NW | Bidirectional | Metrobus: A58, C85, D20, D74, D80, D82; Washington Metro: at Foggy Bottom-GWU station |
| Pennsylvania Avenue NW / 21st Street NW | Eastbound | Metrobus: D20, D80 |
| H Street NW / 18th Street NW Farragut West Farragut North | Eastbound | Metrobus: A49, A58, D20, D70, D72, D80, D94, F19; MTA Maryland Bus: 901, 902, 904, 905, 909, 950, 995; Loudoun County Transit; PRTC OmniRide; MTA Maryland Bus: 305, 325; PRTC OmniRide; Washington Metro: |
| I Street NW / 18th Street NW Farragut West Farragut North | Westbound | Metrobus: A49, A58, D20, D70, D72, D80, D94, F19; PRTC OmniRide; Washington Metro: |
| I Street NW / 17th Street NW Farragut Square | Westbound | Metrobus: A49, A58, D20, D70, D72, D80, D94, F19; MTA Maryland Bus: 901, 902, 904, 905, 909, 950, 995; Loudoun County Transit; PRTC OmniRide; Washington Metro: (at Farragut West) (at Farragut North) |
| H Street NW / Madison Place NW McPherson Square | Eastbound | Metrobus: A29, A49, D20, D24, D36, D50, D5X, D60, D6X, D72, D80, D94, F19; Washington Metro: |
| I Street NW / 15th Street NW McPherson Square | Westbound | Metrobus: A29, A49, D20, D24, D36, D50, D5X, D60, D6X, D72, D80, D94, F19; Washington Metro: at McPherson Square station |
| H Street NW / 14th Street NW | Eastbound | Metrobus: A29, A49, D20, D24, D36, D50, D5X, D60, D6X, D72, D80, D94, F19; Washington Metro: at McPherson Square |
| I Street NW / 14th Street NW | Westbound | Metrobus: A29, A49, D20, D24, D36, D50, D5X, D60, D6X, D72, D80, D94, F19; Washington Metro: at McPherson Square |
| 13th Street NW / H Street NW | Westbound | Metrobus: D20, D34, D36 |
| 13th Street NW / G Street NW Metro Center | Bidirectional | Metrobus: A29, A49, D20, D24, D30, D32, D34, D36, D44, D60, D6X, D94; MTA Maryland Bus: 901, 902, 904, 905; Loudoun County Transit; PRTC OmniRide; Ride Smart Northern Shenandoah Valley; Washington Metro: |
| 13th Street NW / F Street NW Metro Center | Eastbound | Metrobus: A29, A49, D20, D24, D30, D32, D34, D36, D44, D60, D6X, D94; MTA Maryland Bus: 901, 902, 904, 905; Loudoun County Transit; PRTC OmniRide; Ride Smart Northern Shenandoah Valley; Washington Metro: |
| Pennsylvania Avenue NW / 13th Street NW Federal Triangle | Eastbound | Metrobus: D1X, D30, D32, D44, D60, D6X; Washington Metro: |
| Pennsylvania Avenue NW / 12th Street NW Federal Triangle | Westbound | Metrobus: D1X, D30, D32, D44, D60, D6X; Washington Metro: |
| Pennsylvania Avenue NW / 10th Street NW | Bidirectional | Metrobus: D1X, D30, D32, D44, D60, D6X; MTA Maryland Bus: 610, 620, 640, 650, 705, 715, 820; PRTC OmniRide |
| Pennsylvania Avenue NW / 7th Street NW Archives | Bidirectional | Metrobus: D1X, D40, D4X; MTA Maryland Bus: 610, 640, 650, 705, 810, 820, 830, 840; PRTC OmniRide; Washington Metro: |
| Pennsylvania Avenue NW / 6th Street NW | Eastbound | |
| Pennsylvania Avenue NW / Constitution Avenue NW | Westbound | |
| 4th Street NW / Madison Drive NW | Bidirectional | |
| Independence Avenue SW / 4th Street SW | Westbound | Metrobus: D1X; Washington Metro: at Federal Center SW |
| Independence Avenue SW / 3rd Street SW | Eastbound | Metrobus: D1X; Washington Metro: at Federal Center SW |
| Independence Avenue SW / Washington Avenue SW | Westbound | |
| Independence Avenue SW / 1st Street SW | Eastbound | |
| Independence Avenue SE / New Jersey Avenue SE | Bidirectional | |
| Independence Avenue SE / 1st Street SE Capitol South | Bidirectional | Metrobus: D1X; Washington Metro: |
| Pennsylvania Avenue SE / 3rd Street SE | Bidirectional | |
| Pennsylvania Avenue SE / 6th Street SE | Bidirectional | |
| Pennsylvania Avenue SE / 8th Street SE Eastern Market | Bidirectional | Metrobus: C53, C55, D1X; Washington Metro: |
| Pennsylvania Avenue SE / E Street SE | Westbound | |
| Pennsylvania Avenue SE / 11th Street SE | Eastbound | |
| Pennsylvania Avenue SE / 13th Street SE | Bidirectional | |
| Pennsylvania Avenue SE / Potomac Avenue SE Potomac Avenue | Bidirectional | Metrobus: C15, C37, C41, C51, D1X; Washington Metro: |
| Pennsylvania Avenue SE / L'Enfant Square SE | Bidirectional | Metrobus: C15, C31, C37, D1X |
| 27th Street SE / R Street SE | Westbound | |
| 25th Street SE / Park Place SE | Eastbound | |
| 25th Street SE / R Street SE | Eastbound | |
| Naylor Road SE / S Street SE | Eastbound | |
| Naylor Road SE / Park Naylor Apartments | Bidirectional | |
| #2619 Naylor Road SE | Eastbound | |
| Naylor Road SE / Marion Barry Avenue SE | Westbound | |
| Marion Barry Avenue SE / 25th Street SE | Eastbound | Metrobus: C23, C53 |
| Naylor Road SE / Marion Barry Avenue SE | Westbound | Metrobus: C21, C23, C25, C26, C27, C53 |
| Naylor Road SE / Alabama Avenue SE | Eastbound | Metrobus: C21, C23, C25, C26, C27, C53 |
| Alabama Avenue SE / 25th Street SE | Eastbound | Metrobus: C21, C25, C26, C27, C53 |
| Alabama Avenue SE / Ainger Place SE | Bidirectional | Metrobus: C21, C25, C26, C27, C53 |
| Alabama Avenue SE / Hartford Street SE | Bidirectional | Metrobus: C21, C25, C26, C27, C53 |
| Alabama Avenue SE / Irving Place SE | Eastbound | Metrobus: C21, C25, C26, C27, C29, C53 |
| Alabama Avenue SE / Jasper Street SE | Westbound | Metrobus: C21, C25, C26, C27, C29, C53 |
| Alabama Avenue SE / 24th Street SE | Bidirectional | Metrobus: C21, C25, C26, C27, C29, C53 |
| 23rd Street SE / Alabama Avenue SE | Bidirectional | Metrobus: C21, C25, C26, C27, C29, C53 |
| Savannah Street SE / 24th Street SE | Eastbound | Metrobus: C25, C26, C27 |
| Savannah Street SE / 23rd Street SE | Westbound | Metrobus: C25, C26, C27 |
| 22nd Street SE / Southern Avenue SE | Westbound | Metrobus: C27 (Eastbound only) |
| 22nd Street SE / Savannah Street SE | Westbound | Metrobus: C27 (Eastbound only) |
| #3417 25th Street SE | Eastbound | Metrobus: C27 (Westbound only) |
| 25th Street SE / Southern Avenue SE | Eastbound | Metrobus: C27 (Westbound only) |
Temple Hills, Maryland
| Southern Avenue SE / 22nd Street SE | Eastbound | Metrobus: C27 |
| Southern Avenue SE / Mississippi Avenue SE | Westbound | Metrobus: C27 |
| Southern Avenue SE / Valley Terrace SE | Bidirectional | |
| Southern Avenue Bus Bay A | Westbound stop, Eastbound terminal | Metrobus: C15, C29, P93, P94, P97; TheBus: P88, P95; Washington Metro: |

=== Route D1X stops ===
| Bus stop | Direction | Connections |
Washington, D.C.
| 10th Street NW / Pennsylvania Avenue NW Federal Triangle | Bidirectional | Metrobus: D10, D30, D32, D44, D60, D6X; MTA Maryland Bus: 610, 620, 640, 650, 705, 715, 820; PRTC OmniRide; Washington Metro: at Federal Triangle |
| Pennsylvania Avenue NW / 7th Street NW Archives | Eastbound | Metrobus: D10, D40, D4X; MTA Maryland Bus: 610, 640, 650, 705, 810, 820, 830, 840; PRTC OmniRide; Washington Metro: |
| 7th Street NW / Constitution Avenue NW | Eastbound | Metrobus: D30, D40, D60 |
| Constitution Avenue NW / 9th Street NW | Westbound | Metrobus: D30, D32, D40, D4X, D60 |
| Independence Avenue SW / 4th Street SW | Westbound | Metrobus: D10; Washington Metro: at Federal Center SW |
| Independence Avenue SW / 3rd Street SW | Eastbound | Metrobus: D10; Washington Metro: at Federal Center SW |
| Independence Avenue SE / 1st Street SE Capitol South | Bidirectional | Metrobus: D10; Washington Metro: |
| Pennsylvania Avenue SE / 8th Street SE Eastern Market | Bidirectional | Metrobus: C53, C55, D10; Washington Metro: |
| Pennsylvania Avenue SE / Potomac Avenue SE Potomac Avenue | Bidirectional | Metrobus: C15, C37, C41, C51, D10; Washington Metro: |
| Pennsylvania Avenue SE / L'Enfant Square SE | Bidirectional | Metrobus: C15, C31, C37, D10 |
| Pennsylvania Avenue SE / 27th Street SE | Eastbound | Metrobus: C37 |
| Pennsylvania Avenue SE / 28th Street SE | Westbound | Metrobus: C37 |
| Pennsylvania Avenue SE / 30th Street SE | Bidirectional | Metrobus: C37 |
| Pennsylvania Avenue SE / 31st Street SE | Bidirectional | Metrobus: C37 |
| Pennsylvania Avenue SE / Branch Avenue SE | Bidirectional | Metrobus: C37 |
| Branch Avenue SE / S Street SE | Westbound | Metrobus: C35 |
| Branch Avenue SE / T Street SE | Eastbound | Metrobus: C35 |
| Branch Avenue SE / U Street SE | Bidirectional | Metrobus: C35 |
| Branch Avenue SE / Alabama Avenue SE | Bidirectional | Metrobus: C21, C23, C35 |
| Branch Avenue SE / Camden Street SE | Eastbound | Metrobus: C35 |
| Camden Street SE / 33rd Street SE | Westbound | Metrobus: C35 |
| 33rd Street SE / Denver Street SE | Bidirectional | |
| 33rd Street SE / Erie Street SE | Eastbound | |
| Erie Street SE / 33rd Street SE | Westbound | |
| Erie Street SE / 31st Street SE | Bidirectional | |
| Erie Street SE / 30th Street SE | Eastbound | Metrobus: C27 |
| 30th Street SE / Erie Street SE | Westbound | Metrobus: C27 |
| 30th Street SE / Naylor Road SE | Bidirectional | Metrobus: C27 |
| Southern Avenue SE / 30th Street SE | Westbound | Metrobus: C27 (Westbound only) |
| 30th Street SE / Buena Vista Terrace SE | Westbound | Metrobus: C27 (Westbound only) |
| #3041 Naylor Road SE | Eastbound | Metrobus: C27 (Eastbound only) |
| Naylor Road SE / Southern Avenue SE | Eastbound | Metrobus: C27 (Eastbound only) |
Temple Hills, Maryland
| Naylor Road Bus Bay E | Westbound stop, Eastbound terminal | Metrobus: C27, C35, P63; TheBus: P83, P86; Washington Metro: |

== History ==
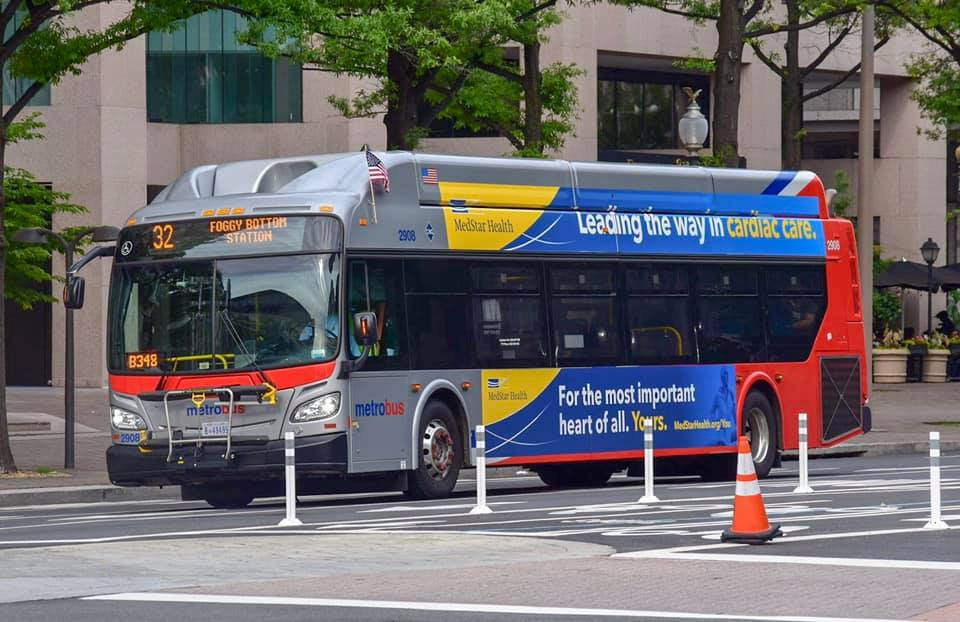
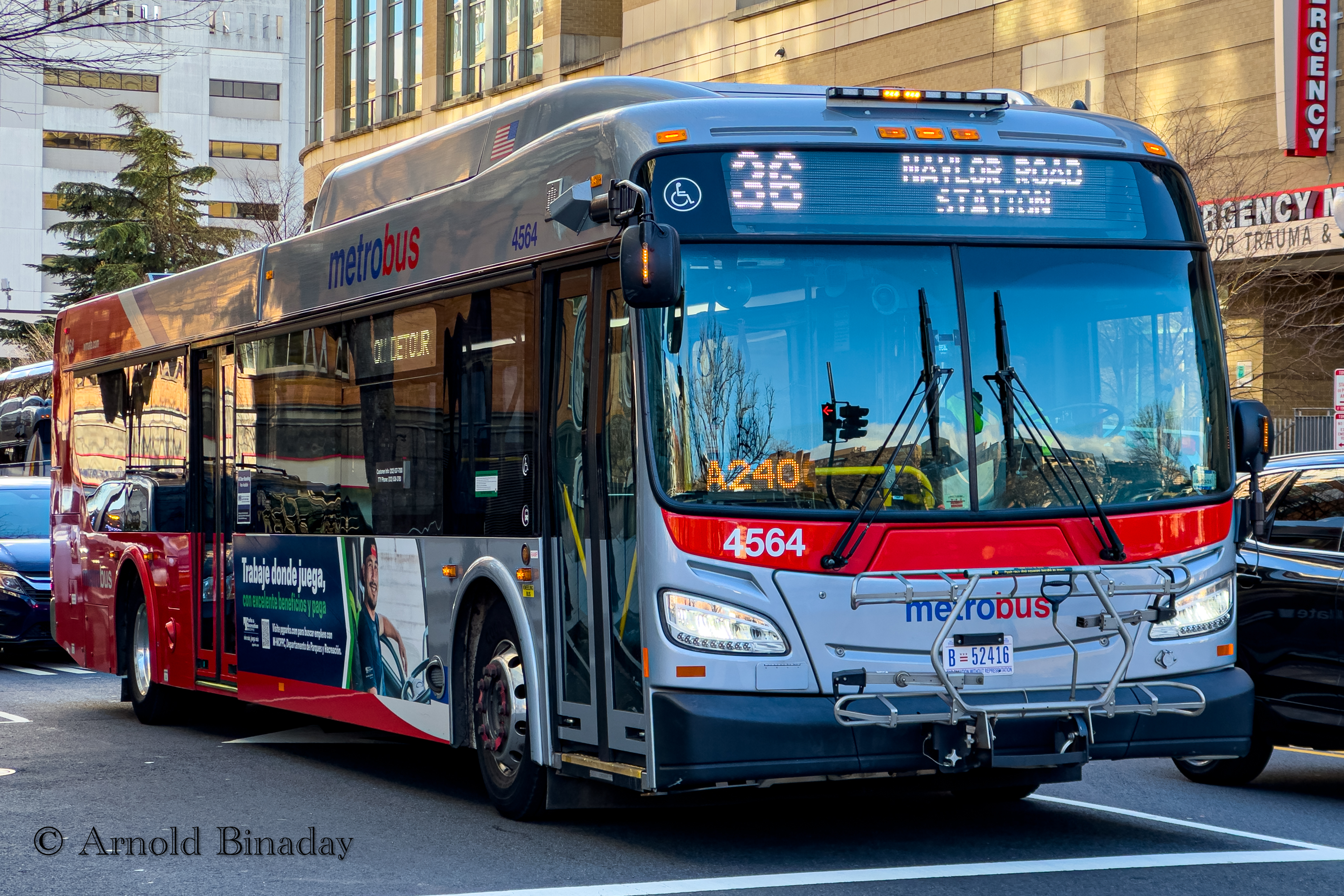
Former Routes 32 and 36.

The Pennsylvania Avenue Line was the main line of the Capital Traction Company, connecting Georgetown to the Navy Yard. As authorized in the charter, it began at M Street North and Wisconsin Avenue in Georgetown, and headed east and southeast across Rock Creek on the Pennsylvania Avenue Bridge (shared with the Washington Aqueduct). Because the White House and Capitol lie directly in the line of Pennsylvania Avenue, diversions were made around the White House to the north and east via 15th Street Northwest and around the south edge of the Capitol Grounds. At the time, this meant that it turned south along the current western boundary (First Street West) between the two traffic circles, but continued to curve southeast and east to the intersection of A Street South and First Street East, where Pennsylvania Avenue restarted. The line continued along Pennsylvania Avenue to Eighth Street Southeast, turning south to end at the Navy Yard. A branch to the Baltimore and Ohio Railroad station ran northeast from Pennsylvania Avenue and First Street West to New Jersey Avenue and B Street North, heading east on B Street and south just east of the Capitol to rejoin the main line.

Trains began running between the Capitol and White House on July 29, 1862, and the line was extended west to Washington Circle on August 12, Georgetown on August 18, and east to the Navy Yard on October 2. Connections could also be made to the Baltimore and Potomac Railroad station at Sixth Street once it opened in 1872.

On March 3, 1875, the Washington and Georgetown and Metropolitan Railroad were "directed to take up such portions of their tracks as may come in way of the improvement of the Capitol Grounds". This improvement gave the Capitol Grounds their present shape, bounded by First Street West and East and B Street North and South, and the Pennsylvania Avenue Line was moved to First Street West and B Street South. The B&O station branch was moved to First Avenue West and C Street North, ending at New Jersey Avenue; this had been the route of the B&O before its tracks (actually those of the Alexandria and Washington Railroad) were ripped up in 1872.

Also on March 3, 1875, the Washington and Georgetown was required to move its line from the Pennsylvania Avenue Bridge to the M Street Bridge via 26th Street West. The old bridge was reconstructed in the mid-1910s, with Capital Traction paying one-third of the cost, and cars moved back to Pennsylvania on July 7, 1916 (eastbound), and July 15 (westbound).

On August 23, 1894, the company was required to, within a year, build a union station at the Georgetown end of the Aqueduct Bridge and extend its line west to it, where passengers could transfer to lines into Virginia.

The Pennsylvania Avenue Line was extended southeast to the Pennsylvania Avenue Bridge over the Anacostia River in the late 1890s, with some cars running there and some continuing to serve the Navy Yard.

A loop off the line through the West End of Washington was authorized on June 4, 1900 and opened on March 24, 1901. Westbound cars could turn south on 17th Street West, west on G Street North, and north on 25th Street West to return to Pennsylvania Avenue, while the eastbound track was laid in 26th Street West, F Street North, and 17th Street West. A track in G Street between 25th and 26th Streets allowed for a short-turn service, reversing direction at 26th Street.

On May 23, 1908, Congress authorized extensions of several companies to serve Washington Union Station. The Capital Traction's branch to the old B&O station was extended east on C Street and northeast on Delaware Avenue to the station, and a second route between this branch and the tracks towards the east ran via First Street East and B Street North to Delaware Avenue (over trackage owned by other companies).

A second loop through the West End was approved on December 7, 1916, from Pennsylvania Avenue south to Virginia Avenue near West Potomac Park via 18th and 19th Streets.

=== After consolidation ===
After Capital Traction and the Washington Railway and Electric Company were merged in 1933 to form the Capital Transit Company, some of the redundant lines were abandoned. This included the WR&E's Georgetown line between Connecticut and Wisconsin Avenues, resulting in Cabin John Line and Tenleytown Line cars, and cars of other lines that ran to Georgetown, being routed via Pennsylvania Avenue between Georgetown and the White House. When numbers were assigned to the car routes in 1936, the following regular routes used the Pennsylvania Avenue Line:

- 10, Rosslyn to Kenilworth via the Pennsylvania Avenue Line and ex-WR&E Columbia Line (discontinued May 1, 1949)
- 20, Cabin John to Union Station via the ex-WR&E Cabin John Line and Pennsylvania Avenue Line (discontinued January 3, 1960)
- 30, Friendship Heights to Barney Circle via the ex-WR&E Tennallytown Line and Pennsylvania Avenue Line (discontinued January 3, 1960)
- 54, Brightwood to the Navy Yard via the Fourteenth Street Line and Pennsylvania Avenue Line (discontinued January 28, 1962)
- 80, Rosslyn to Brookland via the Pennsylvania Avenue Line and ex-WR&E Brookland Line (discontinued September 7, 1958)
- 82, Potomac Park to Branchville via the Pennsylvania Avenue Line and ex-WR&E Maryland Line (discontinued September 7, 1958)
- 90, Calvert Street Bridge to Barney Circle via the U Street Line, New Jersey Avenue Line, and Pennsylvania Avenue Line (discontinued January 28, 1962)

Thus Pennsylvania Avenue Line streetcars (Route 30) were discontinued on January 3, 1960, and the tracks east of 14th Street Northwest were last used on January 28, 1962. Route 54 buses still serve a small part of Pennsylvania Avenue, used by the 50 streetcar line.

The East Washington Heights Traction Company's streetcars, which ran from Barney Circle to Randle Highlands via the Sousa Bridge, were replaced by buses on December 1, 1923, originally numbered Route C2 in 1936, before eventually being renamed as routes, "32 & 34". The 32 streetcar line operated between Shipley Terrace & Friendship Heights; while the 34 streetcar line operated between Hillcrest & Friendship Heights.

The Capital Traction Company began operating buses to Hillcrest and Good Hope on December 23, 1924, originally numbered as Route C6 in 1936, before eventually being renamed as routes, "35 & 36". Both the 35 & 36 bus routes operated between Hillcrest & Friendship Heights, just like the 34 bus route, only with the exception that 35 & 36 would divert off of the intersection of Naylor Road SE onto the intersection of Branch Avenue SE, then operate on Branch Avenue SE, before operating on Pennsylvania Avenue SE, while 34 would remain straight on Naylor Road SE, then divert onto 23rd Street SE (to Friendship Heights), 25th Street SE (to Hillcrest), and Minnesota Avenue SE (to Hillcrest), before operating on Pennsylvania Avenue SE.

Later, routes 32, 34, 35, and 36 would operate under DC Transit after streetcars were phased out. Routes 30, 32, 34, 35, and 36 eventually became Metrobus routes on February 4, 1973, when WMATA acquired DC Transit and three other transit agencies all operating their original routes.

=== As a bus route ===
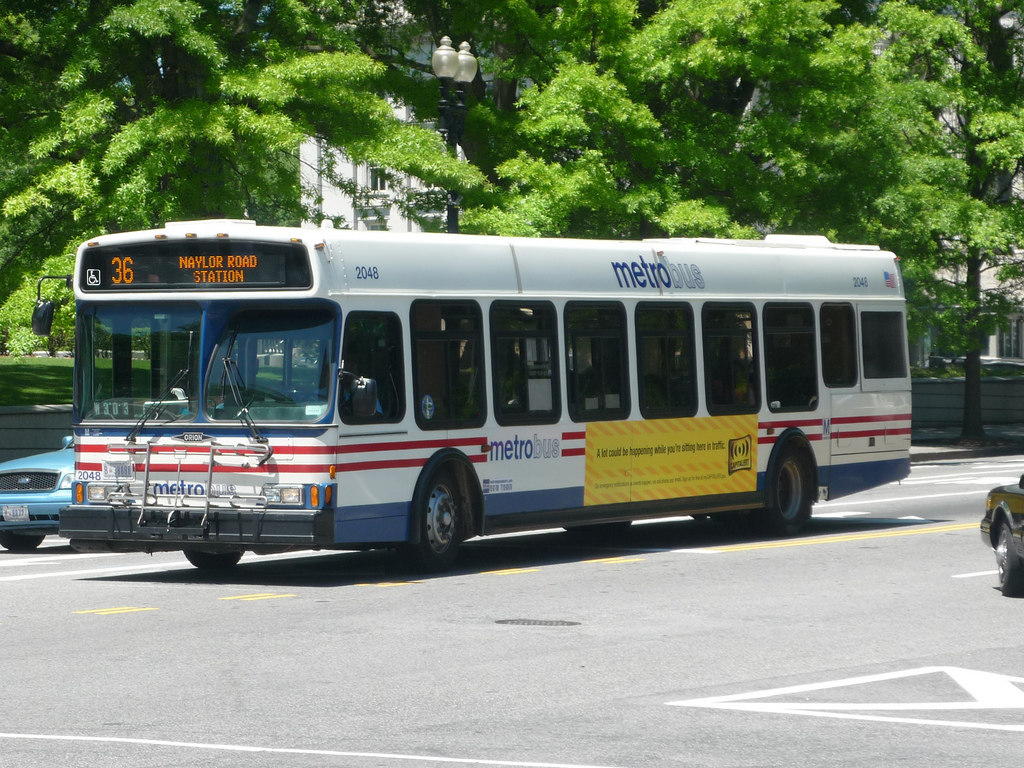
Former Route 36 in 2008

On July 15, 1977, Metro opened its Potomac Avenue, Eastern Market, Federal Triangle, McPherson Square, Farragut West, and Foggy Bottom–GWU stations. These stations were variously served by the 32, 34, 35, and 36 Metrobus lines, which added stops but otherwise did not alter their routes.

On April 30, 1983, when Archives station opened, the 32, 34, 35, and 36 began serving it. The discontinued 30 streetcar line was reincarnated as a bus route between Archives and Friendship Heights.

On August 25, 1984 when Friendship Heights station opened, the 30, 32, 34, 35, and 36 were extended; their Friendship Heights terminus was moved from the intersection of Wisconsin Avenue NW and Western Avenue NW, to the new Metro station. The routes also began serving the new Tenleytown–AU station.

On January 13, 2001, the Naylor Road and Southern Avenue station opened. The southern termini of Routes 34, 35, and 36 were moved south from Naylor Gardens (34 and 35) and Hillcrest (36) to the new Naylor Road station. The terminus of the 32 was moved south from Shipley Terrace to the new Southern Avenue station. Route 30 was extended to connect the Friendship Heights and Potomac Avenue stations. The 35 was rerouted on 30th Street between Erie Street and Naylor Road. Route 36 was extended via 31st, Erie and 30th Streets and Naylor Road. Route 30 was unaffected.

=== Simplification ===
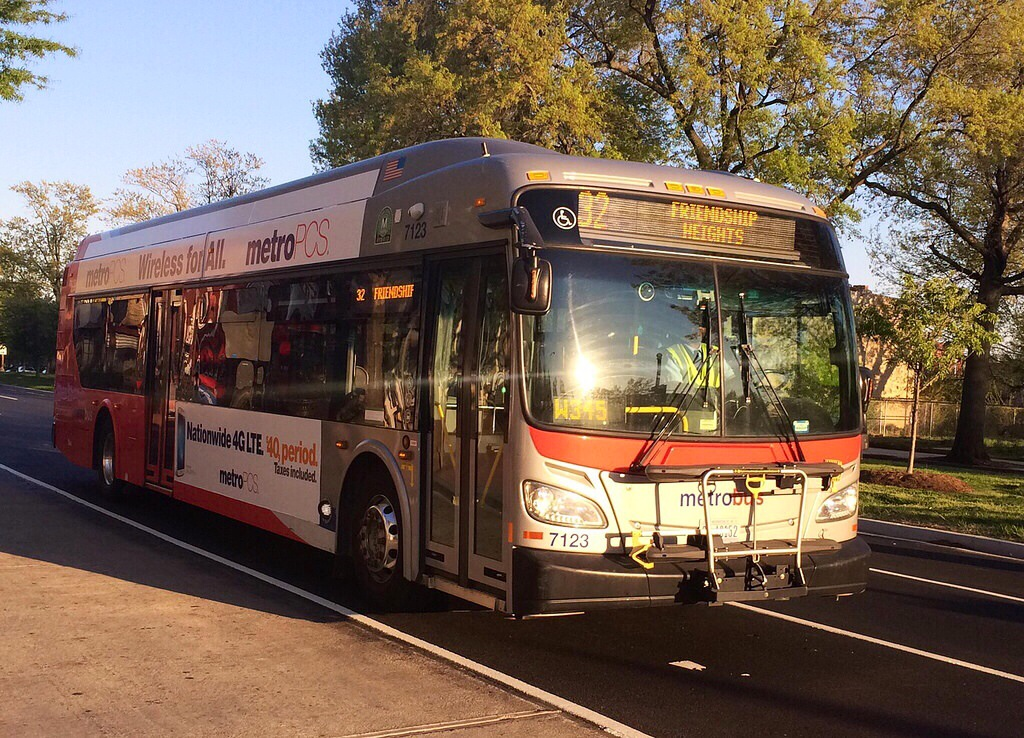
Former Route 32 when it was still serving Friendship Heights in 2014

Rider proposals led on June 29, 2008, to several major changes to the Pennsylvania Avenue Line.

The 30, 34, and 35 routes were discontinued and replaced by new Routes 31, 37, and 39, and the existing routes 32, 36. The 34 was replaced by M5 under the Naylor Road Line, which would operate between the Naylor Road station and Eastern Market station. Route 30, which operated during weekday peak hours, was replaced by Route 37 under the Wisconsin Avenue Limited Line, a limited-stop MetroExtra route that would provide express service between Friendship Heights station & Archives station—Route 30's routing from 1984 to 2001.

Route 39 was also created to operate under the Pennsylvania Avenue Limited Line to provide limited-stop Metrobus service between the Naylor Road station and Foggy Bottom during weekday peak hours, like the 37. Also to ease crowding on the 32 and 36 along Wisconsin Avenue, WMATA created Route 31 under the Wisconsin Avenue Line to provide extra service between Foggy Bottom–GWU station & Friendship Heights.

On December 28, 2008, the M5 was renamed Route 34, which was extended to Archives station. It would operate between Naylor Road station and Archives station on portions of Routes 32 and 36. It would operate as part of the Naylor Road Line, not the Pennsylvania Avenue Line.

=== More Simplification ===
In 2013, WMATA announced proposals to simplify the busy Pennsylvania Avenue Line and Naylor Road Line even more. Under the proposals, Routes 32 and 36 will terminate at Foggy Bottom with a new 30s line to replace portions of the 32, and 36, and discontinue the 34 with four options to replace the 32 and 36. According to WMATA, it proposes the following:

- Option 1: Same as Route 32 between Southern Avenue and Potomac Avenue Station SE, then west to Georgetown via Lincoln Park, Union Station, and Thomas Circle, and then follow Route 31 between Georgetown and Friendship Heights.
- Option 2: Same as Route 32 between Southern Avenue and Eastern Market, then west to Georgetown via 8th Street, Massachusetts Avenue, Union Station, and Thomas Circle, and then follow Route 31 between Georgetown and Friendship Heights.
- Option 3: Same as Route 32 between Southern Avenue and Independence Ave & 7th St SW, then west to Foggy Bottom via Independence Ave, 17th St SW, Virginia Ave, and Washington Circle, and then follow Route 31 to Friendship Heights.
- Option 4: Same as Route 32 between Southern Avenue and Anacostia Freeway SE, then west to Foggy Bottom via Anacostia Freeway, Southeast/Southwest Freeway, Maine Avenue, 17th St SW, Virginia Ave, and Washington Circle, and then follow Route 31 to Friendship Heights.

This was to improve service frequency, reliability, and efficiency of 30s Line routes and provide transfer-free bus service between Southeast DC and Upper Northwest that bypasses downtown traffic congestion.

On August 24, 2014, changes were made to the Pennsylvania Avenue Line as part of another restructuring effort.

Both routes 32 and 36 were both shorten to operate to Foggy Bottom–GWU station, instead of operating to Friendship Heights station, being replaced by the 30N and 30S which covers the former routing as route 32 and 36. Both the 30N and 30S would operate 24 hours a day with each trip every hour from each other.

A new route 33 was also introduced to operate alongside the 31. The 33 provides service along Wisconsin Avenue NW to provide discontinued service from the 32 and 36 lines running from Friendship Heights station and Federal Triangle.

The 32 and 36 will operate alongside the 34, with the Naylor Road Line name being discontinued and replaced by the current Pennsylvania Avenue Line name.

=== Later Changes ===
In 2015, WMATA proposed to eliminate all evening and weekend service for route 34 due to riders mostly riding routes 30N, 30S, 32, and 36.

On March 27, 2016, route 34 discontinued all late-night service after 9:19 PM and all weekend service, with alternative service provided by the 30N and 36.

Beginning on December 15, 2019, routes 32, 34, and 36 along with routes 30N, 30S, and 39 were rerouted to travel across the National Mall along 4th Street between Pennsylvania Avenue NW and Independence Avenue SW towards Archives, Friendship Heights and Potomac Park instead of 7th Street to provide a more direct service to the route.

During WMATA's 2021 fiscal year budget, it was proposed for the 34 to be fully eliminated as it overlaps both routes 32 and 36 to simplify the 30s line. However WMATA later backed out the elimination of the 34 on April 2, 2020. The 34 elimination was brought back on February 20, 2021 during WMATA's FY2022 budget.

During the COVID-19 pandemic, all route 34 service was suspended and all route 32 and 36 service was reduced to operate on its Saturday supplemental schedule beginning on March 16, 2020. However beginning on March 18, 2020, route 32 and 36 was further reduced to operate on its Sunday schedule. Service on weekends were also suspended being replaced by the 30N and 30S that operated every 30 minutes. On August 23, 2020, route 32 and 36 service had their normal weekday schedule restored with increased weekend service to replace weekend route 30N and 30S service which was suspended. However, route 34 remained suspended.

Later in February 2021 during WMATA's FY2022 budget crisis, WMATA proposed to both add additional service and increase span to add late-night service to 2:00 AM on Routes 32 and 36 between July and December 2021 in the first half of the fiscal year, but would reduce it back to midnight between January to June 2022 in the second half of the fiscal year. Route 34 would still not return under this proposal. Subsequently on April 22, 2021, WMATA approved the FY2022 budget and received federal funding to avoid service cuts.

On June 6, 2021, late-night service was increased to operate up to 2:00 AM.

On June 10, 2021, WMATA proposed to increase the 32 and 36 to operate every 12 minutes daily between 7:00 AM to 9:00 PM daily as part of WMATA's Pandemic Recovery Plan. However the 34 would still not return to service under this proposal.

On September 5, 2021, the line was increased to operate every 12 minutes daily between both the 32 and 36. This also essentially eliminated the 34 due to its overlap with the 32 and 36 and was no longer listed on WMATA's website.

Due to rising cases of the COVID-19 Omicron variant, the line was reduced to its Saturday service on weekdays. Full weekday service resumed on February 7, 2022.

On December 17, 2023, new 24 hour service was added to Route 33.

In 2024 during WMATA's FY2024 Budget crisis, WMATA proposed to terminate all 32 and 36 service at L'Enfant Plaza station. Service between Archives station and Potomac Park would be eliminated. However on April 25, 2024, Metro’s Board of Directors approved a $4.8 billion capital and operating budget which avoided service cuts.

=== Better Bus Redesign ===
In 2022, WMATA launched its Better Bus Redesign project, which aimed to redesign the entire Metrobus Network and is the first full redesign of the agency's bus network in its history.

In April 2023, WMATA launched its Draft Visionary Network. As part of the drafts, WMATA proposed to modify the 32 to operate along Constitution Avenue NW, Virginia Avenue NW, and 23rd Street NW to serve Foggy Bottom–GWU station and operate through Potomac Park as Route DC111. Route 32 service along 23rd Street SE and Minnesota Avenue SE in Southeast Washington would instead operate along 27th Street SE. Route 36 was modified to terminate at Archives station and was renamed to Route DC218.

During WMATA's Revised Draft Visionary Network, WMATA renamed the DC111 to Route D12 and was modified to operate to the Kennedy Center via the current Route 32 routing between the intersection of Independence Avenue SW & 4th Street SW, and Washington Circle via 4th Street SW/NW, Pennsylvania Avenue NW, 13th Street NW, H Street NW (to Southern Avenue), and I Street NW (to Washington Circle), then would operate along New Hampshire Avenue NW and 25th Street NW to the Kennedy Center. Late night service would operate between Southern Avenue station and Foggy Bottom–GWU station. Route MD218 was also renamed to Route D1X and was turned into a limited-stop express service, operating on the current 36 routing between Naylor Road station and the intersection of Independence Avenue SW & 4th Street SW, then would be extended to Foggy Bottom station via Constitution Avenue and Virginia Avenue. The D1X would make limited stops along Pennsylvania Avenue SE and all local stops in the Hillcrest neighborhood. All changes were then proposed during WMATA's 2025 Proposed Network.

During the proposals, Route D12 was renamed to Route D10 and kept its same proposed routing. Route D1X would also be cutback to Archives station, where it would run the current D1X routing from Naylor Road station to the intersection of Independence Avenue SW & 4th Street SW, then would continue along Independence Avenue SW, then operate to Archives station via 7th Street SW/NW, Constitution Avenue NW, and 9th Street NW.

On November 21, 2024, WMATA approved its Better Bus Redesign Network, with service on the Pennsylvania Avenue Line being simplified.

Beginning on June 29, 2025, Route 32 was renamed to the D10, and was rerouted to serve the Kennedy Center instead of Potomac Park. Route 36 was shortened to terminate at Archives station and was renamed to the D1X, almost matching the former 34 and 39 service.

On December 14, 2025, all D1X trips were extended from Archives station to Federal Triangle station.
