= U Street station =

Washington Metro station

Coordinates: 38°54′59.4″N 77°1′43″W

U Street African-American Civil War Memorial/Cardozo
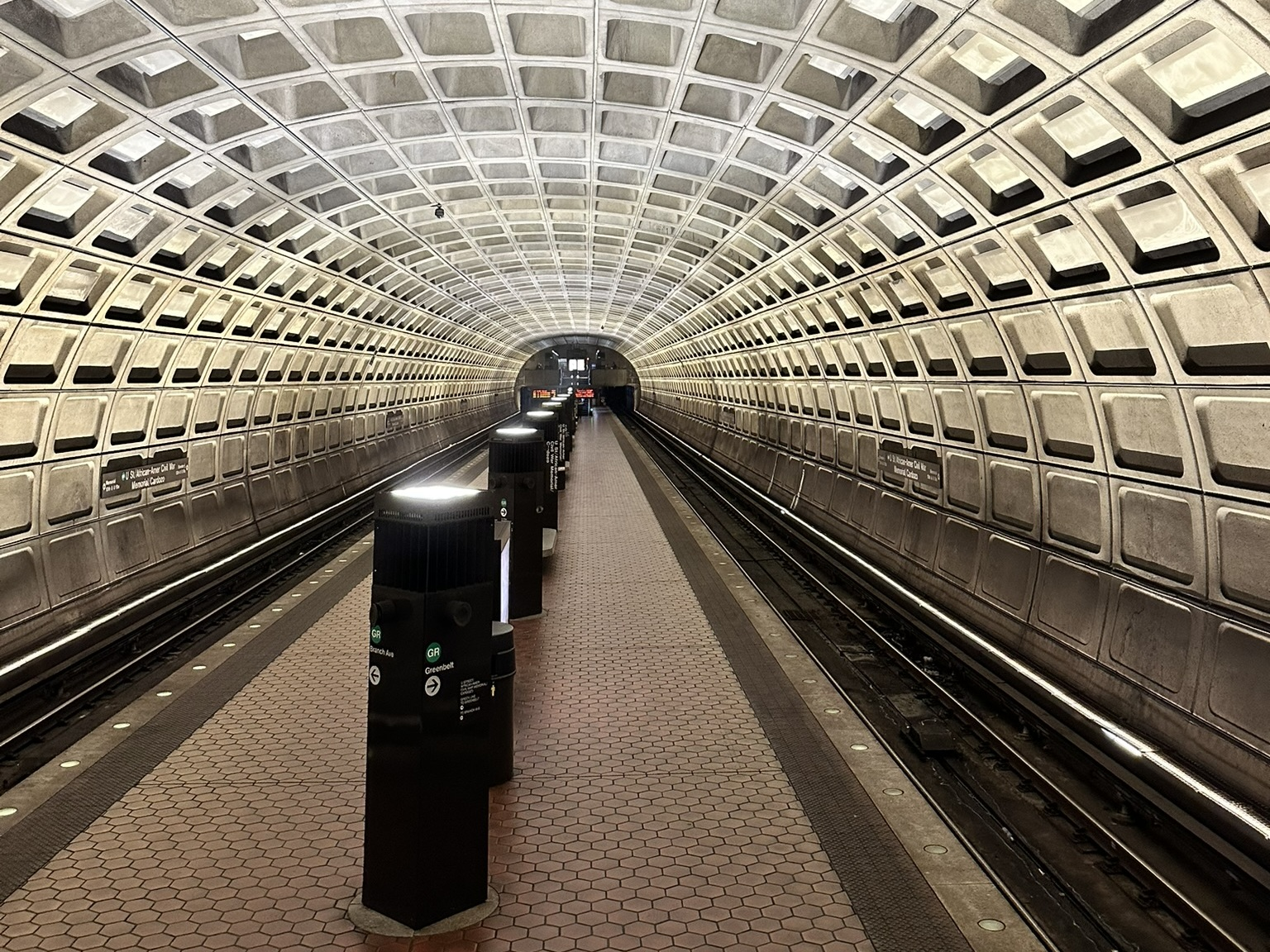
- U Street station platform in February 2025

General information
- Location: 1240 U Street NW; Washington, D.C.
- Owner: Washington Metropolitan Area Transit Authority
- Platforms: 1 island platform
- Tracks: 2
- Connections: Metrobus: C51, C53, C57, D44, D50, D5X

Construction
- Structure type: Underground
- Cycle facilities: Capital Bikeshare
- Accessible: Yes

Other information
- Station code: E03

History
- Opened: May 11, 1991
- Former names: U Street-Cardozo (1991–1999); U Street African-American Civil War Memorial/Cardozo (1999–2011)

Passengers
- 2025: 5,592 (average weekday)
- Rank: 26 of 98

Services
Preceding station	Washington Metro	Following station
Shaw–Howard University toward Huntington	Yellow Line	Columbia Heights toward Greenbelt
Shaw–Howard University toward Branch Avenue	Green Line	Columbia Heights toward Greenbelt
Route map
Location

U Street station is a rapid transit station on the Green Line and Yellow Line of the Washington Metro in the U Street neighborhood of Washington, D.C. U Street station is located in northwest Washington and serves the U Street neighborhood. The station is about five blocks east of the neighborhood of Adams Morgan.

== Station layout ==
U Street station has a single island platform with entrances at either end, leading from U Street at 10th and 13th Streets. Like nearly all non-interchange stations on the Metro, there are two tracks: trains using track E1 head to Greenbelt, while those on E2 are bound for Branch Avenue.

== History ==
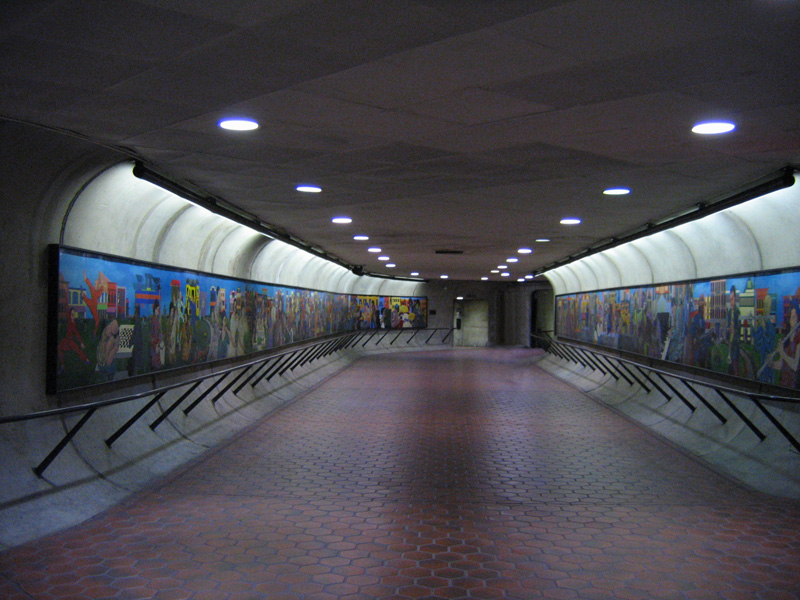
Corridor to 13th Street entrance. Painted murals depict African-American musicians dancing in the street, a homage to U Street's cultural heritage.

Before the creation of WMATA in February 1967, plans for rapid transit focused on the needs of commuters while neglecting some of the District's less affluent neighborhoods. As planning for Metro got underway in 1969, planners eyed the commercial district around 14th and U Streets, which had largely been destroyed the previous year by riots that followed the assassination of Martin Luther King Jr. Planners hoped that adding a subway stop in the area would stimulate redevelopment.

The original 1969 plan called for a line under 13th Street NW with just two stations. In 1970, the District of Columbia Council agreed to pay an additional $3 million to add a third station and reroute the Green Line under U Street, and then 14th Street NW.

Metro's first stations opened in 1976, but another 15 years passed before the first Green Line stations opened in 1991. The U Street station opened as U Street/Cardozo, the name of nearby Cardozo High School having been added just before opening. Trains initially served this station as Yellow Line trains until Green Line service was introduced later that year.

In 1999, the station was renamed U Street/Cardozo/African-Amer Civil War Memorial to reflect the recent completion of the African American Civil War Memorial at U Street and Vermont Ave NW.

On June 10, 2001, Metro Transit Police officer Marlon C. Morales was killed at the station while intervening in a fare dispute. A plaque exists outside the 13th Street entrance in his honor.

Yellow Line service resumed in late 2006 as part of what was initially an 18-month experiment to extend that line to Fort Totten station during non-rush hours and weekends.

On November 3, 2011, the WMATA Board voted to shorten all station names longer than 19 characters. Effective June 2012, the station was renamed U Street, with "African American Civil War Memorial / Cardozo" as a subtitle.

On May 7, 2023, the northeastern terminus of the Yellow Line was shifted from Greenbelt to Mount Vernon Square, shortening the line after it reopened after a nearly eight-month project to rehabilitate its bridge over the Potomac River and its tunnel leading into L'Enfant Plaza. Half of Yellow Line service was re-extended back to Greenbelt on December 31, 2025.
