= Bladensburg Road Line =

Bus route in Washington, D.C., United States

C41
- Bladensburg Road Line

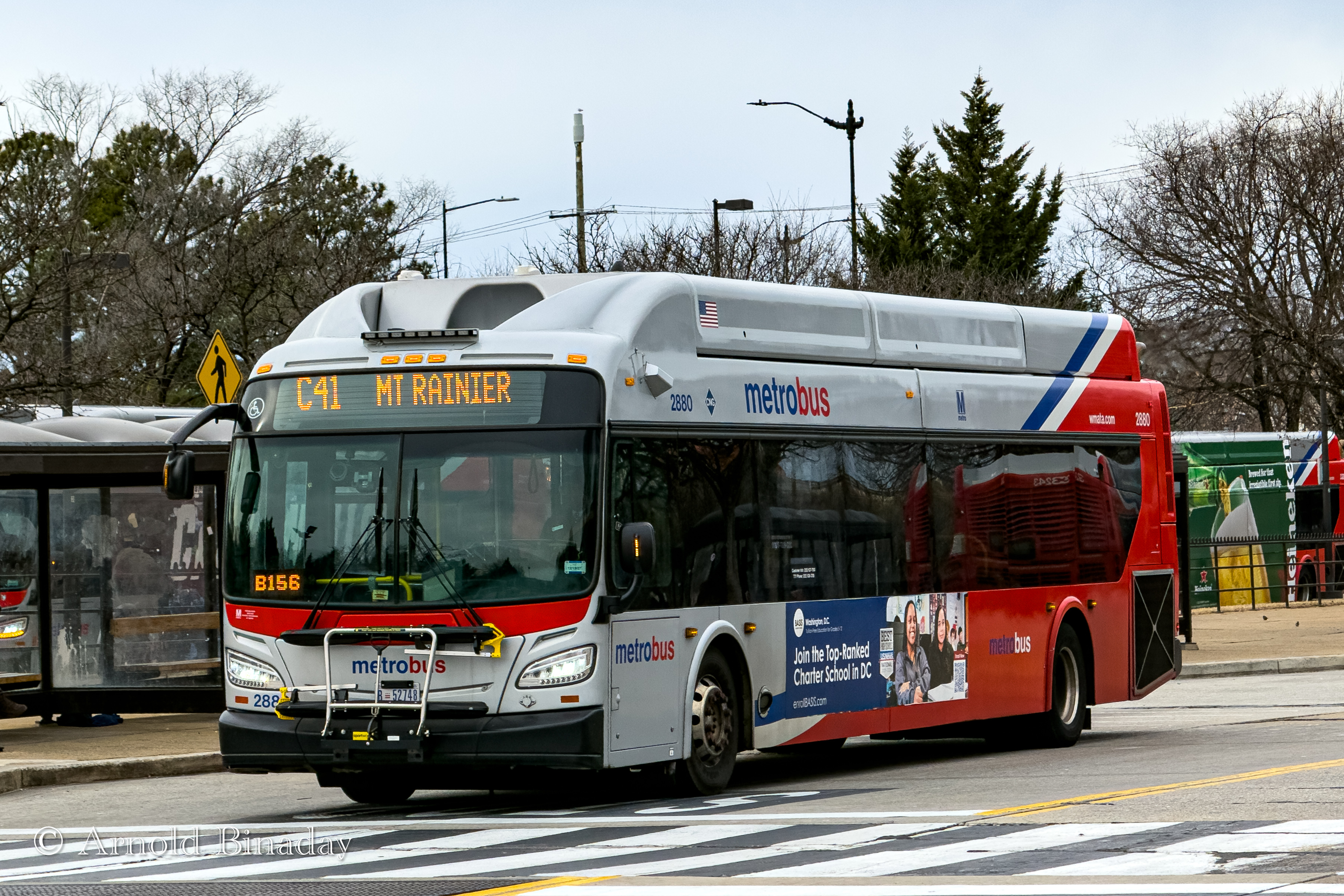
- Route C41 at Anacostia station

Overview
- System: Metrobus
- Operator: Washington Metropolitan Area Transit Authority
- Garage: Bladensburg
- Livery: Local
- Status: Active
- Began service: 1910
- Predecessors: B2

Route
- Locale: Prince George's County, Northeast, Southeast
- Communities served: Hyattsville, Mount Rainier, Woodridge, Fort Lincoln, Langdon, Hill East, Barney Circle, Barry Farm, Anacostia
- Landmarks served: West Hyattsville station, Mount Rainier Terminal, Hechinger Mall, Stadium–Armory station, D.C. General Campus, Potomac Avenue station, Frederick Douglass National Historic Site, Anacostia station
- Start: West Hyattsville station Mount Rainier Terminal (Municipal Place & Rhode Island Avenue)
- Via: Hamilton Street, 38th Avenue, Bladensburg Road NE, 14th / 15th Streets NE, Potomac Avenue SE, Martin Luther King Jr Avenue SE
- End: Anacostia station
- Length: 60 minutes

Service
- Level: Daily
- Frequency: 12-20 minutes
- Operates: 24 Hours
- Ridership: 2,719,204 (FY 2025)
- Transfers: SmarTrip only
- Timetable: Bladensburg Road Line

The Bladensburg Road Line, designated as Route C41, is a daily bus route operated by the Washington Metropolitan Area Transit Authority between Anacostia station of the Green Line of the Washington Metro & Mount Rainier Terminal in Mount Rainier or West Hyattsville station of the Green and Yellow Lines of the Washington Metro. Route C41 operates every 12 minutes between 6 AM and 9 PM and every 20 minutes between 9 PM and 6 AM. C41 trips are roughly 60 minutes long.

== Background ==
Route C41 operates daily between Anacostia station and Mount Rainier Terminal with every other daytime and all late night trips being extended to West Hyattsville station, mostly operating along Bladensburg Road. This route connects Hyattsville, Mount Rainier and Anacostia residents by bus without having to take the train between the points.

Route C41 operates out of Bladensburg division.

== History ==
B2 initially started off as a streetcar line in 1910, operating between Mount Rainier, MD, Municipal Place & Rhode Island Avenue & the Anacostia neighborhood of Southeast Washington D.C. The B2 streetcar line was later replaced by buses in 1923 and eventually became a Metrobus Route on February 4, 1973 when WMATA acquired four private bus companies that operated throughout the Washington D.C. Metropolitan Area and merged them all together to form its own, "Metrobus" System. Route B2 kept operating on the same exact routing as its streetcar route after.

On July 15, 1977 when both Stadium Armory & Potomac Avenue stations opened, B2 began serving both Metrorail Stations in the middle of its route. There were no major changes on its routing however.

On December 28, 1991, when Anacostia station opened, B2 was extended from its original Anacostia terminus at the intersection of W Street SE & 16th Street SE, to operate to the new Anacostia station in the adjacent neighborhood of Barry Farm in Southeast Washington D.C.

In 2001 when a roundabout was constructed at the intersection of Rhode Island Avenue, 34th Street, & Perry Street in Mount Rainier, MD to replace the original traffic lights at the intersection, B2 was rerouted to enter the roundabout when operating to both Mount Rainier and the Anacostia Metro Station. Since then, the B2 kept its current routing and has not gone through any changes until the Better Bus Network was implemented.

During the COVID-19 pandemic, the line was reduced to operate on its Saturday supplemental schedule during the weekdays beginning on March 16, 2020. On March 18, 2020, the line was further reduced to operate on its Sunday schedule. On March 21, 2020, weekend service was reduced to operate every 30 minutes. Service was restored to its full service on August 23, 2020.

In February 2021 during WMATA's FY2022 budget crisis, WMATA proposed to increase span to add late-night service to 2:00 AM on Route B2 between July and December 2021 in the first half of the fiscal year. However in the second half of the fiscal year between January and June 2022, WMATA proposed to reroute the B2 to replace portions of the B8, B9, D6, and H6 which would operate between Fort Lincoln and Union Station via Market Street NE, Fort Lincoln Drive, Eastern Avenue, Bladensburg Road, 14th/15th streets, C/D streets, Stanton Square and Massachusetts Avenue and eliminate service on Eastern Avenue NE (north of Bladensburg Road) and Rhode Island Avenue. It was also proposed to eliminate all service after midnight. Subsequently on April 22, 2021, WMATA approved the FY2022 budget and received federal funding to avoid service cuts.

On June 6, 2021, late-night service was increased to operate up to 2:00 AM.

On June 10, 2021, WMATA proposed to increase the B2 to operate every 20 minutes daily between 7:00 AM to 9:00 PM daily as part of WMATA's Pandemic Recovery Plan.

On September 5, 2021, the line was increased to operate every 20 minutes daily. The line was further increased to operate every 12 minutes on June 25, 2023.

Due to rising cases of the COVID-19 Omicron variant, the line was reduced to its Saturday service on weekdays. Full weekday service resumed on February 7, 2022.

On December 17, 2023, new 24 hour service was added to Route B2.

=== Better Bus Redesign ===
In 2022, WMATA launched its Better Bus Redesign project, which aimed to redesign the entire Metrobus Network and is the first full redesign of the agency's bus network in its history.

In April 2023, WMATA launched its Draft Visionary Network. As part of the drafts, WMATA proposed to extend the B2 from Mount Rainier Terminal to operate to West Hyattsville station via 38th Avenue and Hamilton Street as Route DC114. The proposed route would still operate between Anacostia station and Mount Rainier Terminal, but was also changed to operate along 17th Street SE, 19th Street SE, Stadium–Armory station, Potomac Avenue SE, 11th Street SE, and Martin Luther King Jr. Avenue. Service along 14th Street SE and 15th Street SE was replaced by the proposed Route DC219, which operated between Fort Lincoln and L'Enfant Plaza station, while service along Minnesota Avenue SE, and W Street SE was replaced by the proposed Route DC117, which operates between Navy Yard–Ballpark station and Capitol Heights station. Service along Pennsylvania Avenue SE and East Capitol Street SE was replaced by other Metrobus Routes.

During WMATA's Revised Draft Visionary Network, WMATA renamed the DC114 to Route C41, keeping its same routing between Anacostia station and Mount Rainier Terminal, and had every other trip terminate continue to West Hyattsville station. Route DC219 was renamed to Route D39 and would also keep its same routing, but was dropped during the proposals. The C41 changes were then proposed during WMATA's 2025 Proposed Network.

During the proposals, Route C41 was changed again to have service restored along 14th Street SE, 15th Street SE, and East Capitol Street NE/SE, with the rest of the C41 routing being unchanged.

On November 21, 2024, WMATA approved its Better Bus Redesign Network.

As part of WMATA's Better Bus Redesign beginning on June 29, 2025, the B2 was modified to no longer have service along Pennsylvania Avenue SE, Minnesota Avenue SE, or operate along the Sousa Bridge. Instead, the B2 operates along 11th Street SE via the 11th Street Bridge from Anacostia before turning onto Potomac Avenue SE, before following the current B2 routing. Every other daytime and all late night trips was extended from Mount Rainier Terminal to West Hyattsville station via 38th Avenue and Hamilton Street, partially replacing the former F1. The line was renamed to the C41.

== Incidents ==
- On July 10, 2010, a Maryland teenager posed as a Metrobus worker stole a bus from Bladensburg division and ran the B2 route picking up passengers before crashing the bus. After the riders got off the bus, the teen drove off before being stopped by police, fleeing the scene, and later getting arrested.
- On December 9, 2012, 27-year-old Javon Foster shot and killed 20-year-old Selina Brown and injured Brown's 23-month-old daughter Kodi on board a B2 bus along Minnesota Avenue SE around 5:40 pm. Foster later fled and went to the home of his other child's mother right after the shooting. Then Foster later drove to Long Island, New York where he later committed suicide two days later.
- On May 13, 2020, a Metropolitan Police Department officer was struck by a B2 Metrobus along Bladensburg Road. The officer suffered serious injuries.
