= McLean Gardens =

- Neighborhood of Washington, D.C.
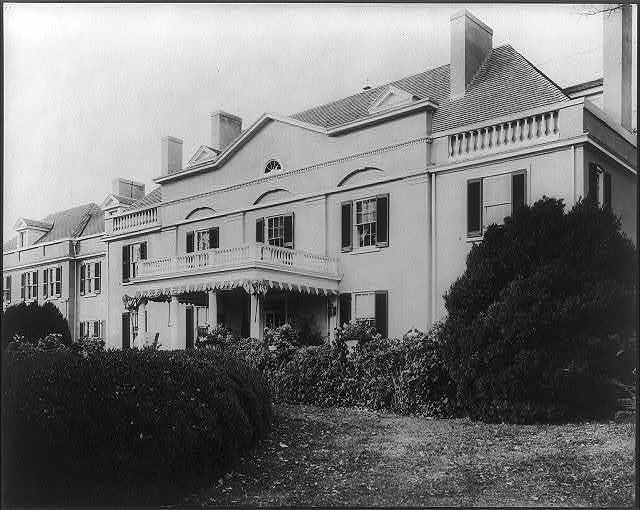
- "Friendship," the estate of John R. McLean, Wisconsin Avenue at Porter Street N.W., Washington, D.C., built in 1898 by Frances Benjamin Johnston

- Map of Washington, D.C., with McLean Gardens highlighted in red
- Coordinates: 38.9372°N 77.0750°W
- Country: United States
- District: Washington, D.C.
- Ward: Ward 3

Government
  - Councilmember: Matthew Frumin

Area
  - Land: 0.07 sq mi (0.18 km^{2})
- Postal code: ZIP code

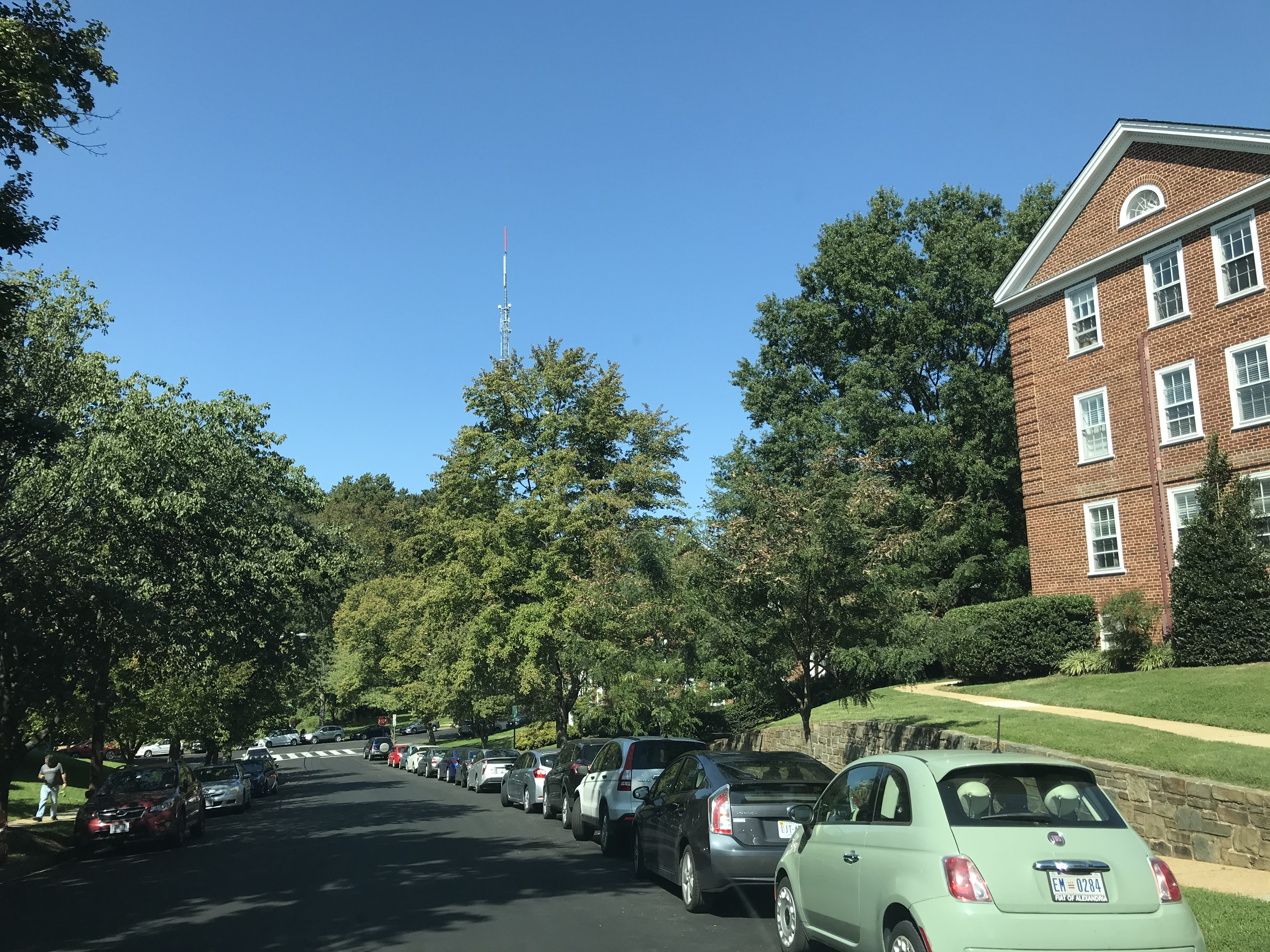
McLean Gardens - Looking down Porter St. NW towards 39th St. NW (September 2020)

McLean Gardens is a residential neighborhood in Northwest Washington, District of Columbia, United States, bounded by Rodman Street NW to the north, Idaho Avenue to the south, Wisconsin Avenue to the east, and 39th Street NW to the west.

McLean Gardens is a 43-acre (17 ha) housing development built in 1942 as temporary housing for wartime defense workers on the former estate of newspaper publisher John R. McLean. In 1980, after a long battle by the tenants, who were able to secure the largest buy-out in DC history by a residents' association, the original 31 red brick apartment buildings converted to condominiums; nine original dormitory buildings had been destroyed in 1974–75. In the early 1980s, construction of a rental section began under a different limited partnership, eventually including both townhouses (called "The Village at McLean Gardens") and a nine-story luxury apartment building ("The Towers"). These units were registered as condominiums with the city so that they could be sold at a later date. That time came in 2006 with the establishment of "Vaughan Place." Tenants in the rental units have claimed that they had not been told that their homes could be sold and had not been given the right to buy first. The McLean School of Maryland is named after the development, as it was started on the ground floor of one of the original buildings. The school was forced to move to its current location in Potomac, Maryland when the demand for housing in the area grew.

Prominent residents include D.C. Council Chairman Phil Mendelson. The historically upscale neighborhood is home to many diplomats and political figures.
