= Duke Ellington Bridge =

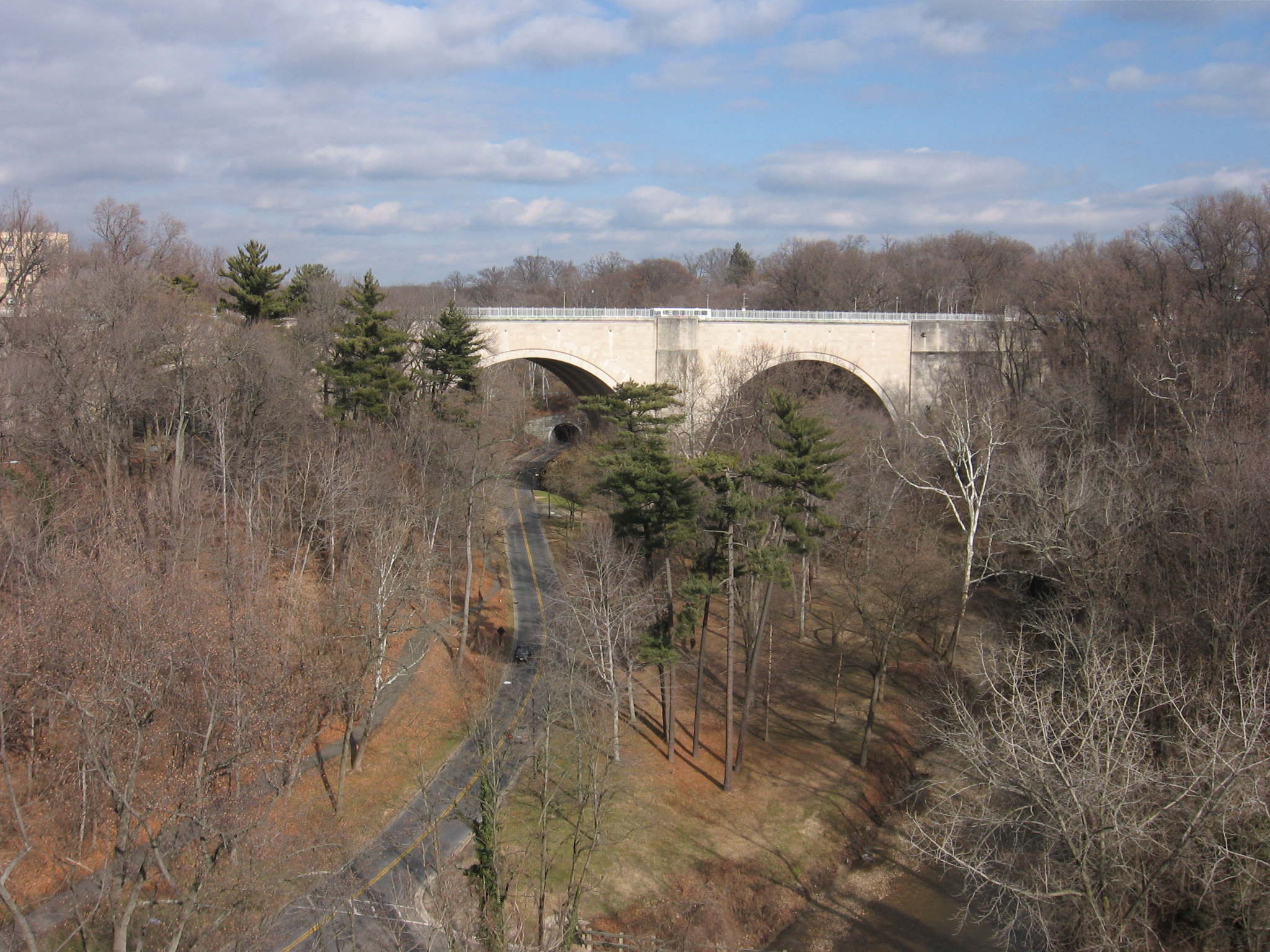
- The Duke Ellington Bridge as seen from the Taft Bridge
- Coordinates: 38°55′24″N 77°2′54″W
- Carries: Calvert Street NW
- Crosses: Rock Creek
- Locale: Washington, D.C.
- Owner: Government of the District of Columbia

Characteristics
- Material: Concrete faced with limestone

History
- Architect: Paul Cret
- Engineering design by: Modjeski, Masters & Chase
- Constructed by: John W. Cowper Co., Inc. of Buffalo, New York
- Construction start: 1933
- Construction end: 1935
- Replaces: Calvert Street Bridge

Location
- Interactive map of Duke Ellington Bridge

The Duke Ellington Bridge, named after American jazz pianist Duke Ellington, carries Calvert Street NW over Rock Creek in Washington, D.C., United States. Completed in 1935 as the Calvert Street Bridge, it connects 18th Street NW in Adams Morgan with Connecticut Avenue NW in Woodley Park, just north of the Taft Bridge.

== History ==
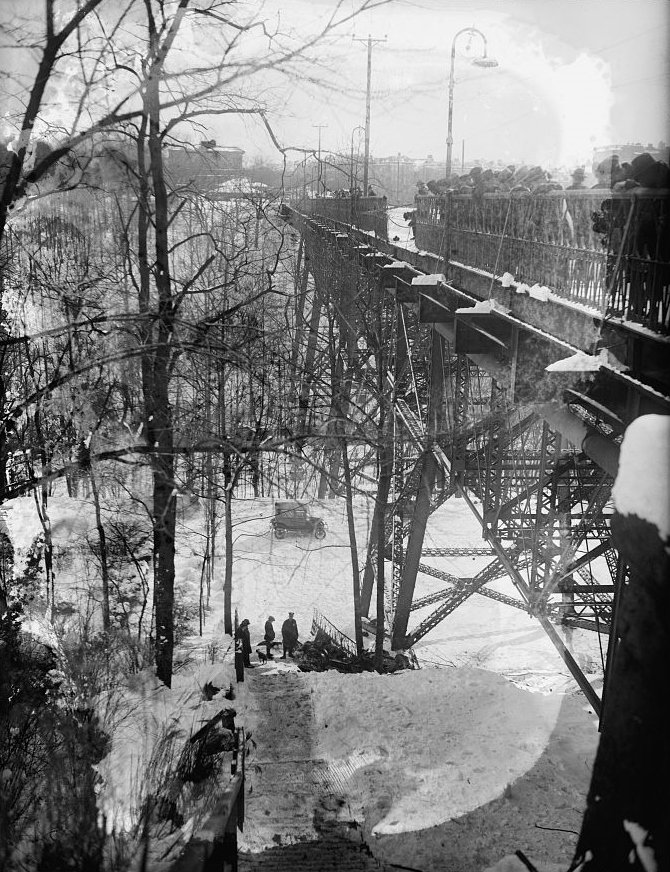
Calvert Street Bridge, 1926

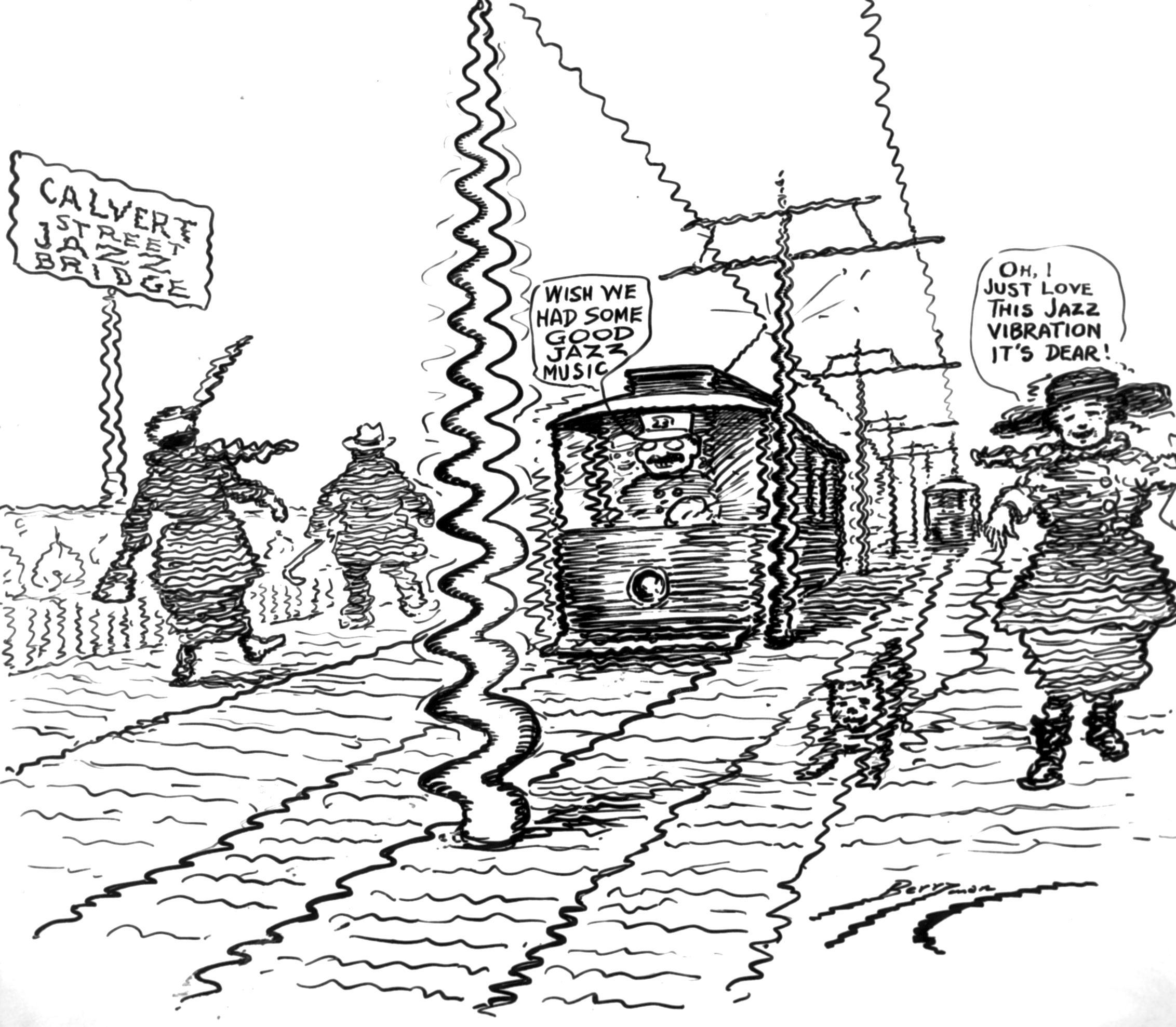
1922 cartoon by Clifford Berryman depicting the old Calvert Street Bridge

The first bridge across the Rock Creek gorge was a 775-foot iron truss bridge built by the Rock Creek Railway as part of the Chevy Chase Land Company's effort to create suburbs in Northwest D.C. and southern Montgomery County, Maryland. Under the terms of the company's charter, this first Calvert Street Bridge was transferred to the D.C. government on July 20, 1891, one day before it was officially completed. The bridge's wooden deck included streetcar tracks and sidewalks atop 125-foot-high iron trestles. The bridge was modified over the decades to reduce the vibrations caused by passing streetcars, but in its fourth decade, city officials decided to replace it. To avoid disrupting streetcar service, the old bridge was moved on rollers 80 feet (24 m) south while its replacement was built—but streetcar service was discontinued just before the new bridge opened.

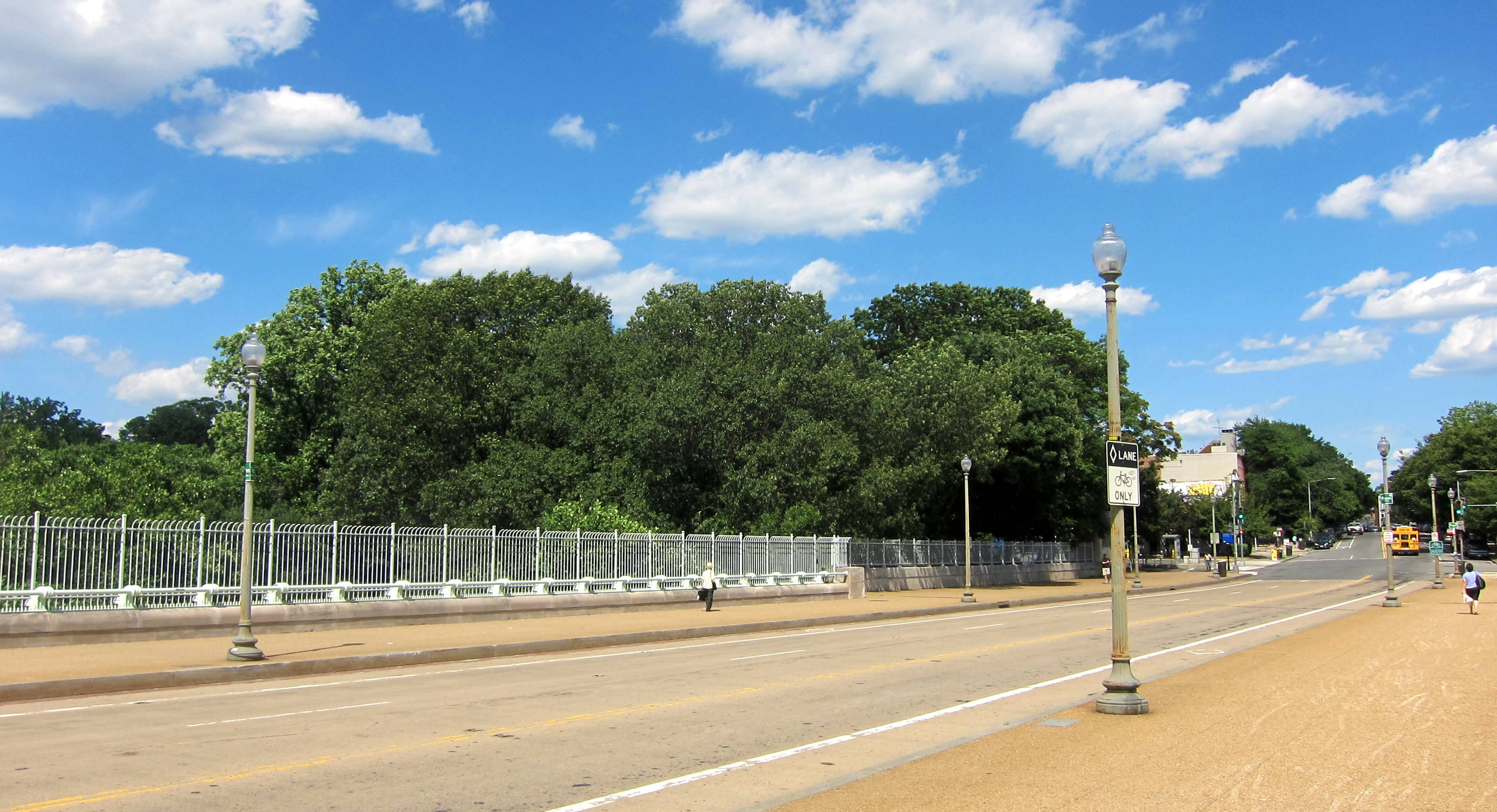
Facing east over the Duke Ellington Bridge

The new Calvert Street Bridge was designed by Paul Philippe Cret in a neoclassical style and built from 1933 to 1935. It is a concrete structure, 825 feet long, faced with Indiana limestone. It has three 146-foot (45 m) arches: the western arch crosses over Cathedral Avenue, the central arch over the Rock Creek Park parkway, and the eastern arch over Rock Creek. The bridge is 128' high; its roadway is 60 feet wide, each sidewalk 12 feet wide. The bridge cost $964,705.35.

There are four sculptural reliefs on the abutments measuring three feet high by four feet wide. The classical reliefs by Leon Hermant represent four modes of travel: automobile, train, ship, and plane.

In 1974, it was rededicated as the Duke Ellington Bridge after the death of the Washington native and famous band leader.

== See also ==
- List of bridges documented by the Historic American Engineering Record in Washington, D.C.
