= Route 63 (disambiguation) =

Route 63 may refer to:

- Route 63 (MTA Maryland), a defunct bus route in Baltimore, Maryland and its suburbs
- London Buses route 63
- Route 63 (WMATA), a bus route in Washington, D.C.

== See also ==
- List of highways numbered 63
