= Route 60 (disambiguation) =

Route 60 may refer to:

- Route 60 (MTA Maryland), a former bus route in Baltimore, Maryland and its suburbs
- Route 60 (MBTA), a bus route in Massachusetts, US
- London Buses route 60
- Route 60 (WMATA), a bus route in Washington, D.C.

== See also ==
- List of highways numbered 60
