= List of Metrobus routes in Washington, D.C. =

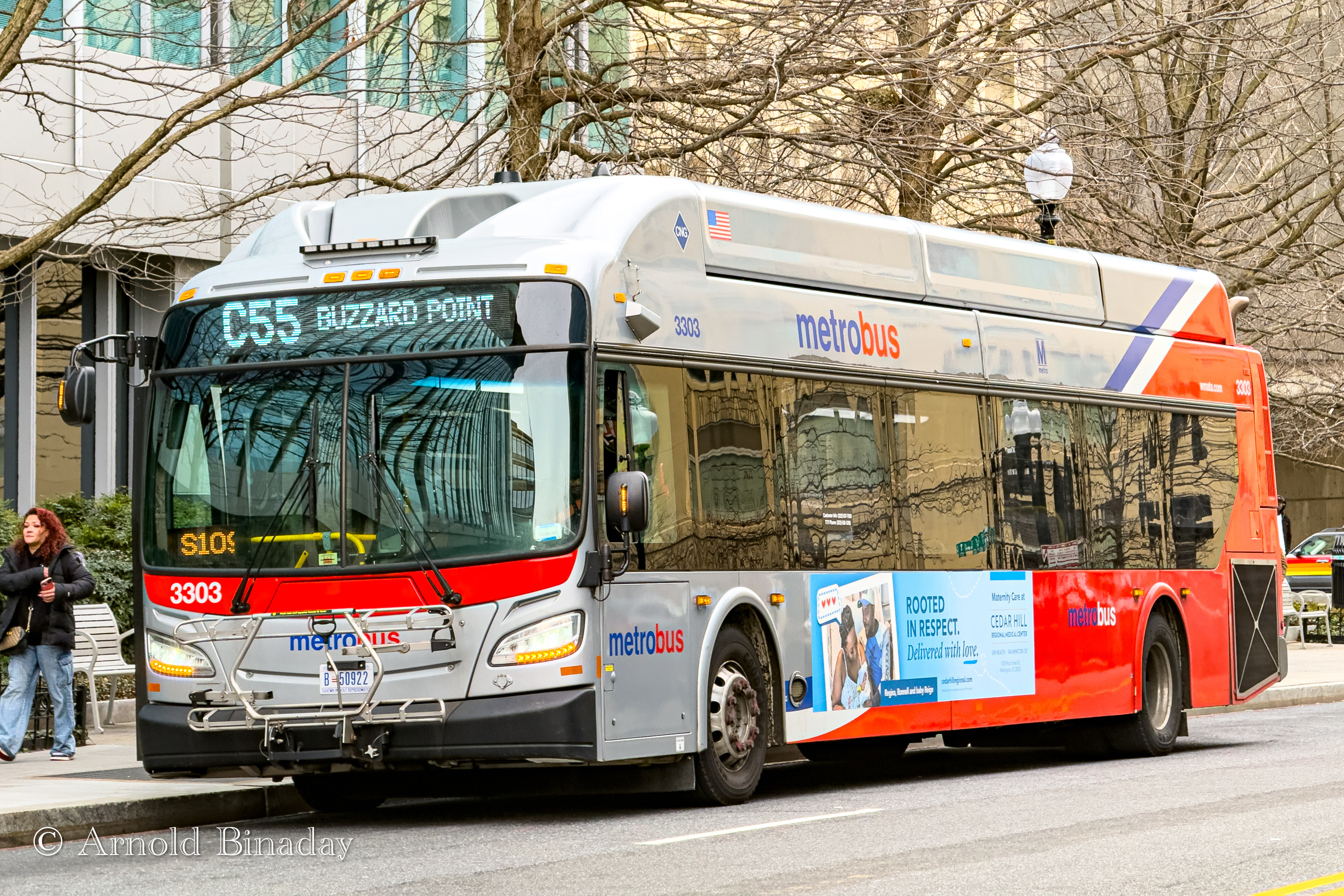
Route C55 at L'Enfant Plaza station

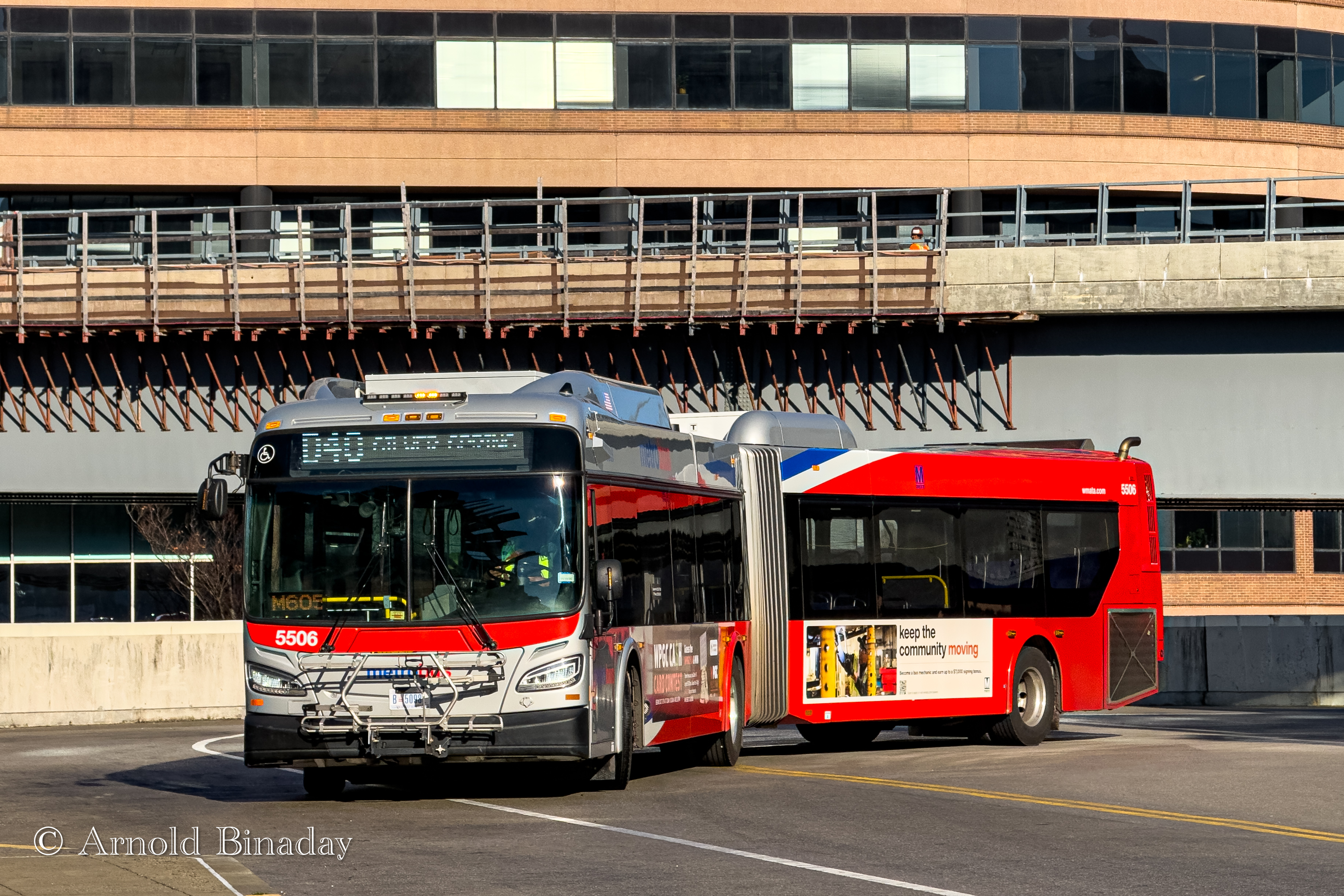
Route D40 at Silver Spring station

This is a list of bus routes operated by the Washington Metropolitan Area Transit Authority (WMATA), branded as Metrobus in Washington, D.C. Many are the descendants of streetcar lines operated by the Capital Transit Company or its predecessors.

== Numbering ==
As of WMATA's Better Bus Redesign beginning on June 29, 2025, all DC routes start with a D or C designation, which applies to Downtown or Crosstown routes respectively, followed by two digits. The second digit identifies the corridor or neighborhood served, generally following a counterclockwise pattern in the style of the old streetcars. For example, the D10 follows Pennsylvania Avenue SE to Southern Avenue SE, and the D90 follows Massachusetts Avenue NW to Tenleytown. The third digit is simply a means of distinction between routes in one corridor; routes ending with X indicate express service.

Formerly, most Metrobus routes in DC were named with a letter followed by a number or double-digit numbers. Historically, the pattern was that:

- Double-digit numerical routes indicated former interurban streetcar lines. (70, 54, 43, etc.)
- Letter-number indicated routes primarily servicing DC. (S9, X2, H4, etc.)
- Letter-number-number indicated routes primarily servicing Maryland. (F14, T18, etc.)
- Number-letter indicated routes primarily servicing Virginia. (7A, 5A, etc.)

Odd-numbered routes were typically part-time variants of even-numbered routes. At one time, odd-numbered routes were express routes, but that distinction was later abandoned. Most odd-numbered routes operated during rush hours and/or limited stops with a few of them running into the off-peak hours and weekends.

== History ==
Many current routes operate under former streetcar routes. The streetcars provided the main transportation in the Washington, D.C. area from the 1800s to the 1960s. DC Transit would also operate on the former streetcar routes when the Streetcars ended service. In 1973, WMATA acquired DC Transit along with other bus companies to form its current Metrobus system.

Due to the COVID-19 pandemic, service was mostly reduced to Sunday service schedules during the weekdays with select routes suspended from March 18 until August 22, 2020. Routes 54, 70, 90, A6, A8, B2, H4, S4, V4, W4, and X2 were the only routes that ran during the weekends with the rest of the routes suspended. On August 23, 2020, more routes came back during the weekdays and weekends returning Metrobus service to 75%. Most service and routes resumed on September 5, 2021 with WMATA introducing a brand new 12-to-20 Minute Frequent Network to select routes. Routes 32/36, 33, 52/54, 79, 80, 90/92, A2/A4/A6/A8, H2/H4, S9, V2/V4, W4, and X2 were added to the 12 Minute Frequent Network and Routes B2, D8, E4, U5/U6, and W2/W3 were added to the 20 Minute Frequent Network. Route B2 was added to the 12 Minute Frequent Network beginning on June 25, 2023.

In 2023, WMATA approved 24-hour service on 14 routes serving DC: A6, A8, B2, H4, S2, V2, W4, X2, 32, 33, 52, 70, 80, and 92. As of June 29, 2025, Routes C11, C13, C21, C31, C41, C53, C61, D10, D20, D30, D40, D50, D60, and D80 have 24-hour service. Routes D32, D70, and D74 will also have 24-hour service beginning in December 2026.

On November 21, 2024, WMATA approved its Better Bus Network Redesign plan, which began development in 2022. Under the plan, all routes would be renamed with easier-to-understand route designations and would modify most of its existing routes to make the bus system easier to use, faster, and more reliable. The Better Bus Network went into effect on June 29, 2025.

== Routes ==
Most DC Metrobus routes operate inside the Washington DC borders. However, some routes would venture into small parts of Montgomery County and Prince George's County to connect to various stations in the Hub-and-spoke system via the old Streetcar routing.

=== Crosstown routes ===
Route	Terminals			Streets traveled	Service notes	Divisions
C11; S Capitol St	L'Enfant Plaza	↔	National Harbor (St. George Bl & Waterfront St); Eastover Shopping Center (late nights)	M St SW/SE; Martin Luther King Av SE; S Capitol St; Indian Head Hwy	24-hour service; Part of 20-minute frequent service network; Late night service terminates at Eastover	Shepherd Parkway
C13; MLK Av–Washington Highlands	Anacostia	↔	Eastover Shopping Center	Martin Luther King Av SE; Wheeler Rd SE	24-hour service; Part of 12-minute frequent service network	Shepherd Parkway
C15; MLK Av–Southern Av	Potomac Avenue	↔	Southern Avenue	Southern Av SE; 4th St SE; Martin Luther King Av SE	Part of 20-minute frequent service network	Shepherd Parkway
C17; MLK Av–Bellevue	Anacostia	↔	Eastover Shopping Center	Martin Luther King Av SE; Mississippi Av SE		Shepherd Parkway
C21; Alabama Av–Benning Rd	Anacostia	↔	Minnesota Avenue	Benning Rd NE/SE; Southern Av SE; Alabama Av SE	24-hour service; Part of 12-minute frequent service network	Shepherd Parkway
C23; Alabama Av–Division Av	Anacostia	↔	Deanwood	Division Av NE; Texas Av SE; Alabama Av SE; Marion Barry Av SE		Shepherd Parkway
C25; Pomeroy Rd–Skyland	Anacostia	↔	Skyland Town Center (Denver & 30th Sts SE)	Sheridan Rd SE; Pomeroy Rd SE; Stanton Rd SE; Alabama Av SE	Part of 20-minute frequent service network	Shepherd Parkway
C26; Stanton Rd–Skyland	Anacostia	↔	Skyland Town Center (Denver & 30th Sts SE)	Sheridan Rd SE; Stanton Rd SE; Alabama Av SE	Part of 20-minute frequent service network	Shepherd Parkway
C27; Congress Hts–Naylor Rd	Naylor Road	↔	DC Village (Shepherd Parkway Bus Garage)	Naylor Rd SE; Barnaby Rd SE; Mississippi Av SE; Alabama Av SE		Shepherd Parkway
C29; Anacostia–Southern Av	Anacostia	↔	Southern Avenue	Southern Av SE; Morris Rd SE; Alabama Av SE	Part of 20-minute frequent service network	Shepherd Parkway
C31; Minnesota Av	Capitol Heights	↔	Navy Yard	Nannie Helen Burroughs Av NE; Minnesota Av NE/SE	24-hour service; Part of 12-minute frequent service network	Shepherd Parkway
C33; Sheriff Rd	Minnesota Avenue	↔	Sheriff Rd; River Terrace	Sheriff Rd NE; Minnesota Av NE; Benning Rd NE	Order of terminals (north to south): River Terrace, Minnesota Avenue, Sheriff Rd NE, then reverse	Bladensburg
C35; Mayfair–Hillcrest	Deanwood	↔	Fort Dupont; Naylor Road	Kenilworth Av NE; Minnesota Av NE/SE; Branch Av SE	Weekday and Sunday service is extended to Naylor Road	Andrews Federal Center
C37; Lincoln Hts–Potomac Av	Minnesota Avenue	↔	Potomac Avenue	Minnesota Av NE; Texas Av SE; Ridge Rd SE; Pennsylvania Av SE; Southern Av SE	Part of 20-minute frequent service network	Shepherd Parkway
C41; Bladensburg Rd	Anacostia	↔	Mount Rainier Terminal (Rhode Island Av & 34th St); West Hyattsville	38th Av; Bladensburg Rd NE; 14th/15th St NE; Potomac Av SE; Martin Luther King Av SE	24-hour service; Daytime trips alternate ending at Mount Rainier or West Hyattsville; Part of 12-minute frequent service network	Shepherd Parkway
C43; Maryland Av	Carver Terrace (21st Pl NE & Maryland Av NE)	↔	Union Station	Maryland Av NE		Shepherd Parkway
C51; U St–Anacostia	Tenleytown	↔	Anacostia	Martin Luther King Av SE; Potomac Av SE; Massachusetts Av NE/NW; New Jersey Av NW; U St NW; Wisconsin Av NW	Part of 20-minute frequent service network	Shepherd Parkway
C53; U St–Congress Heights	Woodley Park; Duke Ellington Bridge (late nights)	↔	Congress Heights	U St NW; Florida Av NW/NE; 8th St NE/SE; Marion Barry Av SE; Alabama Av SE	24-hour service; Part of 12-minute frequent service network; Late night service ends at Duke Ellington Bridge	Shepherd Parkway
C55; Union Station–L'Enfant Plaza	L'Enfant Plaza	↔	Union Station	7th St SW; M St SE	Every other trip operates between L'Enfant Plaza and Buzzard Point only	Shepherd Parkway
C57; U St–Capitol Heights	U Street	↔	Capitol Heights	Florida Av NW/NE; Benning Rd NE; E Capitol St	Weekday peak-hour service only	Andrews Federal Center
C61; Tenleytown–Brookland	Tenleytown	↔	Brookland	Wisconsin Av NW; Porter St NW; Columbia Rd/Irving St NW; Michigan Av NW/NE	24-hour service; Part of 12-minute frequent service network	Bladensburg
C63; Deanwood-Georgia Av	Georgia Avenue–Petworth	↔	Deanwood	Franklin St NE; 14th St NE; Michigan Av NE/NW; Columbia Rd/Irving St NW		Andrews Federal Center
C71; 18th St–Ivy City	Fort Totten	↔	Union Station	South Dakota Av NE; 18th St NE; K St NE		Bladensburg
C75; Takoma–Petworth	Takoma	↔	Georgia Avenue–Petworth	5th St NW; Kansas Av NW	Part of 20-minute frequent service network	Bladensburg
C77; Takoma–Fort Totten	Takoma	↔	Fort Totten	N Capitol St; Kansas Av NE; Eastern Av NW	Weekday peak hour service only	Bladensburg
C81; Military Rd	Sibley Hospital	↔	Fort Totten	Nebraska Av NW; Military Rd NW; Kennedy St NW	Part of 20-minute frequent service network	Bladensburg
C83; Barnaby Woods	Barnaby Woods (Knollwood Retirement Home)	↔	Friendship Heights	Nebraska Av NW; McKinley St NW; Western Av NW; Oregon Av NW		Western
C85; Nebraska Av–Foxhall	Pinehurst Circle (Western Av & Pinehurst Cir)	↔	Foggy Bottom	Nebraska Av NW; Wisconsin Av NW; McArthur Bl NW; Canal Rd NW	Weekday peak-hour service only	Western
C87; 16th St–Tenleytown	Silver Spring (Paul S. Sarbanes Transit Center)	↔	Tenleytown	16th St NW; Military Rd NW; Nebraska Av NW	Weekday peak-hour service only	Montgomery
C91; Georgetown–LeDroit Park	Georgetown University (37th & O Sts NW)	↔	Howard University (Bryant St NW & #301)	P St NW; Q St NW	Part of 20-minute frequent service network	Western

==== Route history ====
Route	History
C11	Combination of the former Route P6 between M Street and Anacostia, and Route A8 between L'Enfant Plaza and South Capitol Street SE with an extension to National Harbor via Indian Head Highway.
C13	Combination of the former Routes A2, A6, and A7 with an extension to Eastover Shopping Center.
C15	Combination of a modified Routes A2 and A8 with an extension to Potomac Avenue station.
C17	Combination of a modified Routes A2, A4, W2, and W3 with an extension to Eastover Shopping Center.
C21	Existing routing of the former Route V7 route while being extended to Anacostia station.
C23	Existing routing of the former Route W4 with a modified routing in Anacostia.
C25	Introduced on December 15, 2024.; Partially replaced the DC Circulator Congress Heights–Union Station via Barracks Row line.; Modified routings of the former Routes W6 and W8.; Was extended to Skyland Center on June 29, 2025.; All trips no longer serve Congress Heights Station on December 14, 2025.
C26	Modified routings of the former Routes W6 and W8.; All trips no longer serve Congress Heights Station on December 14, 2025.
C27	Modified routing of the former Route W1 with an extension to D.C. Village, and terminating at Naylor Road station.
C29	Modified routing of the former Routes W2 and W3.
C31	Existing routing of the former V2 with an extension to Navy Yard.
C33	Existing routing from the former Route U4.
C35	Modified routing from the former Route U7 with a peak-hour extension to Naylor Road.; All weekday and Sunday service was extended from Fort Dupont to Naylor Road station on June 21, 2026. Saturday service operates between Deanwood station and Fort Dupont only.
C37	Combination of the former Route M6 and Route U5.
C41	Modified routing from the former Route B2 with an extension to West Hyattsville.
C43	Existing routing from the former Route X8.
C51	Existing routing of the former Route 96 between Tenleytown and Union station, and rerouted to Anacostia station.
C53	Existing routing from the former Route 92.
C55	Modified routing from the former Route 74 between Buzzard Point and L'Enfant Plaza while being extended to Union station.
C57	Combination of the former Routes 96 and X2.
C61	Modified routing from the former Routes H2 and H4 with service through Washington Hospital Center being eliminated.
C63	Modified routing from the former Route H6 between Brookland and Fort Lincoln with extensions to Washington Hospital Center and Deanwood.; All trips were extended from Washington Hospital Center to Georgia Avenue–Petworth station on December 14, 2025.
C71	Existing routing of the former Route E2 with an extension to Union Station via K Street NE.
C75	Existing routing of the former Routes 62 and 63.
C77	Existing routing of the former Route K2.
C81	Combination of the former Route E4 between Fort Totten and Military Road NW, and the former Route M4 between Military Road NW and Sibley Hospital.
C83	Combination of the former Route E4 between Friendship Heights and McKinley Street, and the former Route M4 between Nebraska Avenue NW and Knollwood.
C85	Modified routing of the former Route M4 between Pinehurst and Tenleytown with an extension to Foggy Bottom.
C87	Existing routing of the former Route D31 with an extension to Tenleytown station and Silver Spring station.; All trips to Van Ness station were discontinued on December 14, 2025.
C91	Existing routing of the former Route G2.

=== Downtown routes ===
Route	Terminals			Streets traveled	Service notes	Divisions
D10; Pennsylvania Av	Southern Avenue	↔	Kennedy Center; Foggy Bottom (late nights)	Pennsylvania Av SE/NW; Alabama Av SE; Naylor Rd SE	24-hour service; Part of 20-minute frequent service network; Late night trips end at Foggy Bottom	Andrews Federal Center; Shepherd Parkway
D1X; Pennsylvania Av Express	Naylor Road	↔	Federal Triangle	Pennsylvania Av SE/NW; Branch Av SE; Naylor Rd SE	Part of 20-minute frequent service network	Andrews Federal Center
D20; H St	Minnesota Avenue	↔	Farragut Square; Foggy Bottom (late nights)	Benning Rd NE; H St NE/NW	24-hour service; Part of 12-minute frequent service network	Andrews Federal Center; Bladensburg; Shepherd Parkway
D2X; H St Express	Capitol Heights	↔	Gallery Place	E Capitol St; Benning Rd NE; H St NE/NW	Weekday service only	Andrews Federal Center
D24; E Capitol St	Deanwood	↔	McPherson Square	E Capitol St; C/D St NE; E St NW	Part of 20-minute frequent service network	Bladensburg
D30; N Capitol St	Fort Totten	↔	Federal Triangle; L'Enfant Plaza (late nights)	12th St NE; Michigan Av NE; N Capitol St; E St NW	24-hour service; Part of 20-minute frequent service network	Bladensburg
D32; Rhode Island Av–Ft Lincoln	Federal Triangle	↔	Fort Lincoln (Petersburg Apartments)	Rhode Island Av NW/NE	Part of 20-minute frequent service network	Bladensburg
D34; Edgewood–Avondale	Metro Center	↔	West Hyattsville	New York Av NW; Monroe St NE		Bladensburg
D36; K St–Ivy City	Washington Hospital Center	↔	Franklin Square ( McPherson Square)	K St NE/NW; Brentwood Rd NE	Part of 20-minute frequent service network	Bladensburg
D40; 7th St–Georgia Av	Silver Spring (Paul S. Sarbanes Transit Center)	↔	Archives; L'Enfant Plaza (late nights)	Georgia Av NW; 7th St NW	24-hour service; Part of 20-minute frequent service network	Montgomery
D4X; 7th St–Georgia Av Express	Silver Spring (Paul S. Sarbanes Transit Center)	↔	Archives	Georgia Av NW; 7th St NW	Part of 12-minute frequent service network	Montgomery
D44; 11th St	Fort Totten	↔	Federal Triangle	New Hampshire Av NW; 11th St NW	Part of 20-minute frequent service network	Bladensburg
D50; 14th St	Takoma (late nights); 14th St & Colorado Av NW	↔	Waterfront; L'Enfant Plaza (late nights)	14th St NW	24-hour service; Part of 20-minute frequent service network	Bladensburg; Shepherd Parkway; Western
D5X; 14th St Express	Takoma	↔	Metro Center	14th St NW	Part of 20-minute frequent service network	Bladensburg; Western
D60; 16th St	Silver Spring (Paul S. Sarbanes Transit Center)	↔	McPherson Square; L'Enfant Plaza (late nights)	Colesville Rd; Eastern Av NW; Alaska Av NW; 16th St NW	24-hour service; Part of 20-minute frequent service network; Late-night service is extended to Federal Triangle and L'Enfant Plaza	Montgomery
D6X; 16th St Express	Silver Spring (Paul S. Sarbanes Transit Center)	↔	Federal Triangle	Colesville Rd; 16th St NW	Part of 12-minute frequent service network	Montgomery
D70; Connecticut Av	Chevy Chase Circle	↔	Farragut Square	Connecticut Av NW	Part of 20-minute frequent service network	Western
D72; Connecticut Av–Mt Pleasant	Van Ness; Mount Pleasant (Lamont St & Mount Pleasant St NW)	↔	Lafayette Square	Columbia Rd NW; Connecticut Av NW; Porter St NW	Part of 12-minute frequent service network; Alternate daytime and all night service is extended to Van Ness	Western
D74; Foggy Bottom–Rhode Island Av	Rhode Island Avenue	↔	Potomac Park (Virginia Av & E St NW)	12th St NE; Taylor St NE; Rock Creek Church Rd NW; Upshur St NW; Columbia Rd/Irving St NW; Connecticut Av NW; New Hampshire Av NW	Part of 20-minute frequent service network	Bladensburg
D80; Wisconsin Av–Union Station	Friendship Heights	↔	Union Station	Wisconsin Av NW	24-hour service; Part of 12-minute frequent service network	Montgomery; Western
D82; Wisconsin Av–Foggy Bottom	Friendship Heights	↔	Potomac Park (Virginia Av & E St NW)	Wisconsin Av NW	Weekday peak-hour service only.	Western
D90; Massachusetts Av–Tenleytown	Tenleytown	↔	Mt. Vernon Square	Massachusetts Av NW; Nebraska Av NW		Western
D94; Gallery Place–Sibley Hospital	Sibley Hospital	↔	Gallery Place	MacArthur Bl NW; Q St NW; H St/I St NW		Western
D96; Massachusetts Av–Bethesda	Bethesda	↔	Dupont Circle; Potomac Park (Virginia Av & E St NW)	Wisconsin Av; Western Av NW; Massachusetts Av NW; Q St NW; 18th St/19th St NW	Service to Potomac Park operates on weekdays only.	Western

==== Route history ====
Route	History
D10	Modified routing of the former Route 32 with a reroute to Kennedy Center instead of Potomac Park.
D1X	Existing routing of the former Route 36 except being cutback to Archives.; All trips were extended from Archives to Federal Triangle station on December 14, 2025.
D20	Existing routing of the former Route X2.
D24	Existing routing of the former Route D6 between McPherson Square and Stadium Armory with an extension to Deanwood.
D2X	Modified routing of the former Route X9, with service to Minnesota Avenue station being discontinued.
D30	Modified routing of the former Route 80, with service ending at Federal Triangle instead of McPherson Square station.
D32	Modified routing of the former Route G8.; All trips were extended from Gallery Place station to Federal Triangle station on December 14, 2025.; Short trips between Federal Triangle and Rhode Island Avenue station extended to serve full route on June 21, 2026
D34	Modified routing of the former Route G8 and P6.
D36	Combination of the former Route D4 and D8.
D40	Existing routing of the former Route 70.
D44	Existing routing of the former Route 64.
D4X	Existing routing of the former Route 79.
D50	Existing routing of the former Routes 52, 54, and 59 with an extension to Waterfront.
D5X	Existing routing of the former Routes 52, 54, and 59.
D60	Existing routing of the former Route S2 with it terminating at McPherson Square instead of Federal Triangle.
D6X	Existing routing of the former Route S9 with an extension to Federal Triangle.
D70	Modified routing of the former Route L2 with service along Calvert Street NW and Columbia Road NW being eliminated.
D72	Existing routing of the former Routes 42 and 43 with a reroute to Lafayette Square and an extension to Van Ness station.; Alternate daytime trips and all late night service was extended to Van Ness station on June 21, 2026.
D74	Combination of the former Routes 42 and 43 and Route H8.
D80	Existing routing of the former Route 33.
D82	Existing routing of the former Route 31.
D90	Modified routing of the former Routes N2, N4, and N6.
D94	Modified routing of the former Route D6 with service ending at Gallery Place instead of Stadium Armory.
D96	Combination of the former Routes 42, D2, N4, and N6.

== Former Routes ==
=== Routes eliminated due to Bus Redesign ===
All routes listed below were eliminated or renamed into an C or D designation on June 29, 2025.

Route	Terminals			Streets traveled	Service notes
31, 33; Wisconsin Avenue Line	Friendship Heights station	↔	31 Potomac Park (Virginia Avenue & E Street NW); 33 Washington Union Station	Wisconsin Avenue NW	Renamed into the D80 (33) and D82 (31).
32, 36; Pennsylvania Avenue Line	Potomac Park (Virginia Avenue & E Street NW)	↔	32 Southern Avenue station; 36 Naylor Road station	Pennsylvania Avenue SE/NW; Branch Avenue SE (36); Alabama Avenue SE (32); Naylor Road SE	32 was renamed into the D10.; 36 was cutback to Archives and renamed into the D1X.
42, 43; Mount Pleasant Line	Mount Pleasant (Lamont & Mount Pleasant Streets NW)	↔	Kennedy Center	Columbia Road NW; Connecticut Avenue NW	Combined with the H8 and renamed into the D72 and D74.
52, 54; 14th Street Line	Takoma station; 14th Street & Colorado Ave NW	↔	52 L'Enfant Plaza station (D & 7th Streets SW); 54 Metro Center (F & 12th Streets NW)	14th Street NW/SW	Renamed into the D50.
59; 14th Street Limited Line	Takoma station	↔	Federal Triangle (10th Street & Pennsylvania Avenue NW)	14th Street NW	Renamed into the D5X.
60; Fort Totten–Petworth Line	Fort Totten station	↔	Georgia Avenue–Petworth station	Rock Creek Church Road NW; Upshur Street NW	Partially replaced by Route D74.
62, 63; Takoma–Petworth Line	Takoma station	↔	62 Georgia Avenue–Petworth station; 63 Federal Triangle (10th St & Constitution Ave NW)	5th Street NW; Kansas Avenue NW; New Hampshire Avenue NW (63); 11th Street NW (63)	Renamed into the C75.
64; Fort Totten–Federal Triangle Line	Fort Totten station	↔	Federal Triangle (10th St & Constitution Ave NW)	New Hampshire Avenue NW; 11th Street NW	Renamed into the D44.
70; Georgia Avenue–7th Street Line	Silver Spring station (Paul S. Sarbanes Transit Center)	↔	Archives station; L'Enfant Plaza station (D Street & 7th Street SW) (late night service)	Georgia Avenue NW; 7th Street NW	Renamed into the D40.
74; Convention Center–Southwest Waterfront Line	Walter E. Washington Convention Center (6th Street & Massachusetts Avenue NW)	↔	Buzzard Point (2nd & R Streets SW)	7th Street NW/SW	Renamed into the C55.
79; Georgia Avenue Limited Line	Silver Spring station (Paul S. Sarbanes Transit Center)	↔	Archives station	Georgia Avenue NW; 7th Street NW	Renamed into the D4X.
80; North Capitol Street Line	Fort Totten station	↔	McPherson Square station; Foggy Bottom-GWU station (late night service)	12th Street NE; Michigan Avenue NE; North Capitol Street; H Street NW	Renamed into the D30.
90, 92; U Street–Garfield Line	Duke Ellington Bridge (90), 92 (during late nights only); Frank D. Reeves Center (U & 14th Streets NW) (92)	↔	90 Anacostia station; 92 Congress Heights station	18th Street NW (90); U Street NW; Florida Avenue NW/NE; 8th Street NE/SE; Good Hope Road SE (92)	90 combined with the 96 and renamed into the C51.; 92 was renamed into the C53.
96; East Capitol Street–Cardozo Line	Capitol Heights station	↔	Tenleytown-AU station	East Capitol Street; Massachusetts Avenue; New Jersey Avenue NW; U Street NW; Wisconsin Avenue NW	Combined with the 90 and renamed into the C51.
A2; Anacostia–Washington Highlands Line	Southern Avenue station	↔	Anacostia station	Martin Luther King Avenue SE; Mississippi Avenue SE; Atlantic Street SE	Combined with the A4, A6, and A7 and renamed into the C13, C15, C17.
A4; Anacostia–Fort Drum Line	D.C. Village (North Parking Lot); Fort Drum (Irvington & Joliet Streets SW)	↔	Anacostia station	Martin Luther King Avenue SE/SW (A4)	Combined with the A2 and W1 and renamed into the C17 and C27.
A6, A7, A8; Anacostia–Livingston Line	Livingston (4501 3rd Street SE) (A6, A8); Southern Avenue & South Capitol Street, SE (A7)	↔	Anacostia station; L'Enfant Plaza station (A6, A8 late nights only)	Martin Luther King Avenue SE; Wheeler Road SE (A6, A7); South Capitol Street (A8)	A6 and A7 combined with the A2 and renamed into the C13.; A8 combined with the P6 and extended to National Harbor and renamed into the C11.
A31, A32, A33; Minnesota Ave–Southeast Line	Anacostia High School	↔	A31 Minnesota Avenue station; A32 Southern Avenue station; A33 Anacostia station	Minnesota Avenue (A31); Martin Luther King Jr Ave (A33); Naylor Road (A32)	Discontinued with no replacement service.
B2; Bladensburg Road–Anacostia Line	Mount Rainier Terminal (Rhode Island Ave & 34th Street)	↔	Anacostia station	Bladensburg Road NE; 14th Street NE (to Anacostia); 15th Street NE (to Mount Rainier); Minnesota Avenue SE; Martin Luther King Jr Avenue SE	Renamed into the C41.
D2; Glover Park–Dupont Circle Line	Glover Park (41st St & Davis Pl NW)	↔	Dupont Circle station (20th & Q Sts NW Entrance)	Q Street NW	Combined with the N4 and N6 and renamed into the D96.
D4; Ivy City–Franklin Square Line	Ivy City (Okie & 16th Streets NE)	↔	McPherson Square station (Franklin Square Entrance)	K Street NW/NE	Combined with the D8 and renamed into the D36.
D6; Sibley Hospital–Stadium Armory Line	Sibley Hospital	↔	Stadium–Armory station (north entrance)	MacArthur Boulevard NW; Q Street NW; I Street NW (to Sibley Hospital); K Street NW (to Stadium-Armory); E Street NW; C Street NE (to Sibley Hospital); D Street NE (to Stadium-Armory)	Split into two routes and renamed into the D24 and D94.
D8; Hospital Center Line	Washington Hospital Center	↔	Union Station	Franklin Street NE; Brentwood Road NE; Mount Olivet Road NE; K Street NE	Combined with the D4 and renamed into the D36.
D31, D32, D33, D34; 16th Street–Tenleytown Line	D31 16th St. and Eastern Ave. N.W.; D32 Columbia Heights station; D34 14th St. and Colorado Ave. N.W.; D33 16th St. and Shepherd St. N.W.	↔	Tenleytown–AU station	16th Street (D31, D33); Military Road (D31, D33, D34); Nebraska Ave; Connecticut Ave (D32); Wisconsin Ave (D32)	D31 extended to Silver Spring and Van Ness and renamed into the C87.; D32, D33, D34 were discontinued with no replacement service.
D51; Congress Heights–Georgetown Line	Congress Heights station	↔	Duke Ellington School of the Arts	Pennsylvania Avenue	Discontinued with no replacement service.
E2; Ivy City–Fort Totten Line	Fort Totten station	↔	Ivy City (Okie & 16th Streets NE)	South Dakota Avenue NE; 18th Street NE	Combined with the E4 and D4 and renamed into the C71.
E4; Military Road–Crosstown Line	Friendship Heights station	↔	Fort Totten station; Riggs Park (Eastern Ave & Jamaica St NE)	McKinley Street NW; Military Road NW; Kennedy Street NW	Split into two routes and renamed into the C81 and C83.
G2; P Street–LeDroit Park Line	Georgetown University (37th & O Streets NW)	↔	Howard University (301 Bryant Street NW)	P Street NW	Renamed into the C91.
G8; Rhode Island Avenue Line	Avondale (Eastern & Michigan Avenues NE)	↔	Farragut Square	Monroe Street NE; Rhode Island Avenue NW/NE; 9th Street NW (to Farragut Square); 11th Street NW (to Avondale); H Street NW	Renamed into the D32 and combined with the P6 and named the D34.
H2, H4; Crosstown Line	Tenleytown–AU station	↔	Brookland–CUA station	Wisconsin Avenue; Porter Street NW (H4); Van Ness Street NW (H2 to Brookland); Veazey Street NW (H2 to Tenleytown); Connecticut Avenue (H2); Columbia Road NW (to Tenleytown); Irving Street NW (to Brookland); Michigan Avenue NW/NE	Combined into one route and renamed into the C61.
H6; Brookland–Fort Lincoln Line	Fort Lincoln (Petersburg Apartments)	↔	Brookland–CUA station	Franklin Street NE; 14th Street NE	Extended to Deanwood and Washington Hospital Center and renamed into the C63.
H8, H9; Park Road–Brookland Line	H8 Mount Pleasant (Mount Pleasant & 17th Streets NW); H9 Archbishop Carroll High School	↔	Rhode Island Avenue–Brentwood station	Irving Street NW (H8 to Rhode Island Avenue); Columbia Road NW (H8 to Mount Pleasant); Rock Creek Church Road NW (H8); 12th Street NE	Combined with the 42 and 43 and renamed into the D74.
K2; Takoma–Fort Totten Line	Takoma station	↔	Fort Totten station	North Capitol Street; Kansas Avenue NE; Eastern Avenue	Renamed into the C77.
L2; Connecticut Avenue Line	Chevy Chase Circle	↔	Farragut Square	Connecticut Avenue NW; Calvert Street NW; Columbia Road NW	Renamed into the D70.
M4; Nebraska Avenue Line	Knollwood (Knollwood Retirement Home); Tenleytown-AU station	↔	Sibley Hospital	Nebraska Avenue NW; Western Avenue	Combined into the E4 and renamed into the C81, C83 and C85.
M6; Fairfax Village Line	Fairfax Village (Alabama & Pennsylvania Avenues SE)	↔	Potomac Avenue station	Pennsylvania Avenue SE; Alabama Avenue SE; Southern Avenue SE	Combined with the U5 and U6 and renamed into the C37.
N2, N4, N6; Massachusetts Avenue Line	Friendship Heights station	↔	Farragut Square	Western Avenue (N4, N6); Wisconsin Avenue (N2); Massachusetts Avenue; New Mexico Avenue NW (N2, N6)	N2 renamed into the D90.; N4 and N6 combined with the D2 and renamed into the D96.
P6; Anacostia–Eckington Line	Anacostia station	↔	Rhode Island Avenue – Brentwood station	M Street SE/SW; Pennsylvania Avenue NW; North Capitol Street	Combined with the A8 and renamed into the C11, and combined into the G8 and renamed into the D34.
S2; 16th Street Line	Silver Spring Station (Paul S. Sarbanes Transit Center)	↔	Federal Triangle (10th St & Constitution Ave NW); L'Enfant Plaza station (D Street & 7th Street SW) (late night service)	Colesville Road; Eastern Avenue NW; Alaska Avenue NW; 16th Street NW	Renamed into the D60.
S9; 16th Street Limited Line	Silver Spring Station (Paul S. Sarbanes Transit Center)	↔	McPherson Square Station (Franklin Square Entrance)	16th Street NW	Renamed into the D6X.
S35; Fort Dupont Shuttle Line	Branch Ave. and Randle Circle	↔	Fort Dupont	Southern Ave; Minnesota Ave	Discontinued with no replacement service.
S41; Rhode Island Ave–Carver Terrace Line	Rhode Island Avenue–Brentwood station	↔	Carver Terrace	Rhode Island Ave; Montana Ave; Bladensburg Road	Discontinued with no replacement service.
U4; Sheriff Road–River Terrace Line	River Terrace and Sheriff Road	↔	Minnesota Avenue station	Sheriff Road NE; Minnesota Avenue NE; Benning Road NE	Renamed into the D33.
U5, U6; Marshall Heights Line	Marshall Heights; Lincoln Heights	↔	Minnesota Avenue station	Minnesota Avenue NE; Texas Avenue SE; Ridge Road SE	Combined with the M6 and renamed into the C37.
U7; Deanwood–Minnesota Ave Line	Minnesota Avenue station	↔	Deanwood station	Minnesota Avenue NE; Nannie Helen Burroughs Avenue NE; Kenilworth Avenue Service Road NE	Extended to Naylor Road and renamed into the C35.
V2, V4; Capitol Heights–Minnesota Avenue Line	Capitol Heights station	↔	V2 Anacostia station; V4 Navy Yard–Ballpark station	Nannie Helen Burroughs Avenue NE; Minnesota Avenue NE/SE; Martin Luther King Jr Avenue SE (V2); M Street SE (V4)	Combined into one route and renamed into the C31.
V7, V8; Benning Heights—Alabama Avenue Line	Minnesota Avenue station	↔	V7 Congress Heights station; V8 Benning Heights (H & 46th Streets SE)	Benning Road NE/SE; Southern Ave SE (V7); Alabama Ave SE (V7)	V7 extended to Anacostia and renamed into the C21.
W1; Shipley Terrace–Fort Drum Line	Southern Avenue station	↔	Fort Drum (Irvington & Joliet Streets SW)	Alabama Avenue SE; Martin Luther King Jr Avenue SW	Combined with the A4 and renamed into the C27.
W2, W3; United Medical Center–Anacostia Line	United Medical Center; Southern Avenue station (W2)	↔	Washington Overlook (Malcolm X Ave & Oakwood St SE) (AM Terminal); Mellon St & Martin Luther King Ave SE) (PM Terminal); Anacostia station	Southern Avenue; Alabama Avenue SE; Morris Road SE; Martin Luther King Jr Avenue SE	Combined into one route and renamed into the C29.
W4; Deanwood–Alabama Avenue Line	Anacostia station	↔	Deanwood station	Division Avenue NE; Benning Road SE; Alabama Avenue SE	Modified and renamed into the C23.
W5; Anacostia–Blue Plains Line	D.C. Village (North Parking Lot)	↔	Anacostia station	South Capitol Street	Discontinued with no replacement service.
W6, W8; Garfield–Anacostia Loop Line	Garfield (Stanton Road & Alabama Avenue SE)	↔	Anacostia station	Good Hope Road SE; Alabama Avenue SE; Stanton Road SE	Modified and renamed into the C25 and C26.
W45, W47; Mt. Pleasant–Tenleytown Line	W45 16th St. & Shepherd St. N.W; W47 14th St. & Colorado Ave. N.W	↔	Tenleytown–AU station	Nebraska Ave; Wisconsin Ave (W47); 14th Street; 16th Street (W45)	Discontinued with no replacement service.
X2; Benning Road–H Street Line	Minnesota Avenue station	↔	Lafayette Square; Foggy Bottom-GWU station (late night service)	Benning Road NE; H Street NE/NW	Renamed into the D20.
X3; Benning Road Line	Minnesota Avenue station	↔	Brentwood Parkway & Penn Street NE (KIPP DC College Prep)	Benning Road NE	Discontinued with no replacement service.
X8; Maryland Avenue Line	Carver Terrace (21st Place & Maryland Ave NE)	↔	Union Station	Maryland Avenue NE	Renamed into the C43.
X9; Benning Road–H Street Limited Line	Capitol Heights station; Minnesota Avenue station	↔	Gallery Place station	Nannie Helen Burroughs Avenue NE; Benning Road NE; H Street NE/NW	Renamed into the D2X.

==== Former Routes History ====
This table gives background knowledge of how routes were created and the overall changes it has gone through the years.

Route	History
31, 33	31 was created on June 29, 2008, to operate between the Foggy Bottom and Friendship Heights stations when 30 was discontinued. (see Pennsylvania Avenue Line); 33 was introduced on August 24, 2014, to replace the 32 and 36 between Friendship Heights and Archives & is a "reincarnated" route 30.; 31 weekend service has been suspended since March 21, 2020; later discontinued by September 5, 2021.; Late night 33 service was extended to L'Enfant Plaza station on May 29, 2022.; 24-hour service for the 33 was introduced on December 17, 2023.; All 31 non-peak hour service was discontinued on December 15, 2024.; 33 was extended to Washington Union Station on December 15, 2024 partially replacing the DC Circulator Georgetown–Union Station line.; Replaced by Routes D80 (33) and D82 (31) on June 29, 2025.
32, 36	32 and 36 replaced almost all of 30, 34, and 35's routing between Naylor Road & Friendship Heights Metro stations on June 29, 2008. (See Pennsylvania Avenue Line); 34 originally operated between Naylor Road & Friendship stations until June 29, 2008, when it was discontinued being replaced by new Route M5. M5 renamed to route 34 when it was "reincarnated" and was extended to Archives station in December 2008.; 32 and 36 have been truncated from Friendship Heights station to Foggy Bottom station as of August 24, 2014, and no longer operate via Wisconsin Ave NW being replaced by the 30N, 30S, 31 and 33.; As of March 27, 2016, Weekday Route 34 service after 9:19 PM & all weekend service were discontinued. Alternative service is available on routes 30N and 36.; 34 was suspended on March 16, 2020; later discontinued by September 5, 2021.; 24-hour service for the 32 was introduced on December 17, 2023.; Replaced by Routes D10 (32) and D1X (36) on June 29, 2025.
42, 43	See Mount Pleasant Line; Replaced by Route D72 on June 29, 2025.
52, 54	52 & 54 originally terminated at Navy Yard until the Navy Yard station opened in December, 1991.; When it opened, 52 was truncated to only operate up to L'Enfant Plaza station & Route 54 was truncated to only operate up to Federal Triangle. 54 was later extended to terminate at L'Enfant Plaza.; Route 53 was introduced on September 18, 1999, several years after the former route 50 was discontinued, operating at first to Bureau Of Engraving before being shortened to Federal Triangle and now to Franklin Square.; Route 54 discontinued service between L'Enfant Plaza and Federal Triangle on June 26, 2016.; Route 53 was discontinued on December 17, 2017, and replaced by Route 54, which in turn, was truncated to Metro Center on the same date.; Route 52 was rerouted to 12th Street & Maine Avenue SW via The Wharf on December 17, 2017.; Also see 14th Street Line; 24-hour service for the 52 was introduced on December 17, 2023.; Replaced by Routes D50 and D5X on June 29, 2025.
59	Began service on January 8, 2018.; Replaced by Routes D50 and D5X on June 29, 2025.
60	60 originally operated between Fort McNair and 11th Street NW & Monroe Street NW (Petworth). However; around December, 1991, 60 was rerouted to operate between the Fort Totten station & Federal Triangle instead of operating between Buzzard Point and Petworth.; On September 18, 1999, both 60 & 64 were truncated even further to only operate between the Fort Totten & Georgia Avenue stations with the portion replaced by the 66.; Route 60 was split from the 64 remaining as the Fort-Totten Petworth Line on June 6, 2021.; Discontinued on June 29, 2025 and partially replaced by Route D74.
62, 63	62 originally operated all the way between the Takoma station and Buzzard Point (Half & O Sts. SW); In December, 1991, 62 was truncated to only operate between the Takoma station & Federal Triangle.; On September 18, 1999, 68 took over the portion of 62's routing between the Georgia Avenue station and Federal Triangle that had been discontinued.; On December 28, 2008, route 68 was extended from Georgia Avenue to Takoma station via the 62's routing and renamed to a new route 63.; 63 operates through the portion of the 62 that operated to Federal Triangle until Georgia Avenue–Petworth station opened on September 18, 1999.; 63 service along Sherman Avenue and 13th, H, and I streets NW was eliminated on September 5, 2021. Route now follows the 64 routing to Federal Triangle.; Route 62 was replaced by Route C75 while Route 63 was replaced by Routes C75 and D44 on June 29, 2025.
64	64 originally operated between Half Street SW & O Street SW (Buzzard Point) and 11th Street NW & Monroe Street NW (Petworth) alongside 60 until December, 1991 when it was rerouted to operate between the Fort Totten station & Federal Triangle to replace the K4.; On September 18, 1999, both 60 & 64 were truncated even further to only operate between the Fort Totten & Georgia Avenue stations with the portion replaced by the 66.; In 2008, 64's original routing between Fort Totten and Federal Triangle was restored and replaced the 66.; 64 also runs on the old 11th Street Streetcar Line.; 64 was rerouted on 11th Street between Florida Avenue & S Street NW to Florida & Vermont Avenues NW to directly serve the U Street Station on June 24, 2018.; Route 64 was split from the 60 and renamed as the Fort Totten–Federal Triangle Line on June 6, 2021.; Replaced by Route D44 on June 29, 2025.
70	Since September 25, 2011, route 71 service was discontinued, while the 70 was shortened to Archives. For service to Southwest Waterfront, see route directly below this one (74).; Late night service was extended to L'Enfant Plaza station on May 29, 2022.; 24-hour service was introduced on December 17, 2023.; Replaced by Route D40 on June 29, 2025.
74	Introduced on September 25, 2011, as a replacement of DC Circulator's discontinued Convention Center-Southwest Waterfront route, as well as the discontinued portion of the 70 and 71 lines between Archives and Buzzard Point.; Service was extended back to Buzzard Point beginning on August 23, 2020.; Replaced by Route C55 on June 29, 2025.
79	79 is a "reincarnation" of the old 73 (Brightwood Express Line) that was discontinued on June 25, 2000, only with the exception that unlike 73, which operated between Georgia & Alaska Aves. NW and L'Enfant Plaza, 79 would operate between the Silver Spring Station and Archives; Began service originally as a rush hour/peak period only route on March 19, 2007; Mid-Day non-rush hour/peak period service began on June 24, 2007; Saturday service began on March 24, 2013.; Sunday service began on December 29, 2013.; Cash-free route from June 24, 2018, until June 23, 2019. Passengers wishing to use cash would have to use Route 70.; Southbound service was rerouted along 7th Street discontinuing service along 9th Street beginning on August 23, 2020.; Replaced by Route D4X on June 29, 2025.
80	80 operated on the North Capitol Street Streetcar Line, alongside 81 between Brookland & West Potomac Park; 80 & 81 later extended to Riggs Road NE, via 12th Street NE and South Dakota Avenue NE during the early 1970s although both routes were eventually truncated to the Fort Totten Metro Station on February 19, 1978, shortly after it opened; 81 operated alongside 80 until sometime around 1996/1997. 81 was then shifted over to operate as part of the College Park Line operating via 83's former routing between Rhode Island Avenue station & Cherry Hill via Greenbelt station, once 83 was rerouted to operate to serve the College Park - U of MD Station instead of the Greenbelt Station. Unlike Route 83, 81 would only operate on Sundays to avoid duplicating C2's already existing Metrobus Service between the University of Maryland and Greenbelt Station, Monday-Saturday, as well as much of 83's already existing Metrobus Service Monday-Saturday between the Rhode Island Avenue Station & Cherry Hill.; Every other weekday trip operates between Fort Totten and McPherson Square only as of March 30, 2014.; All service to Kennedy Center was eliminated on September 5, 2021, being replaced by the 42 and 43. Service now terminates at McPherson Square.; Early morning and late night service was extended to George Washington University Hospital on June 25, 2023.; 24-hour service was introduced on December 17, 2023.; Replaced by Route D30 on June 29, 2025.
90, 92	90 replaced all portions of the 94 north of Anacostia station which became the 94's northern terminal after it opened in 1991; 93 originally operated as part of the Garfield-Owl Line alongside the former 91 route until January 13, 2001 when it was discontinued. 93 was shifted over to operate as part of the U Street-Garfield Line and extended from its original Stanton Road terminus, to operate to the newly opened Congress Heights station during late nights only.; 90, 92, and 93 operated all the way up to McLean Gardens from the mid-1990s until June 24, 2007, when all three routes were truncated to only operate up to Duke Ellington Bridge being replaced by Route 96, which was extended from its original terminus at Duke Ellington Bridge to the McLean Gardens on June 24, 2007.; Beginning June 22, 2014, all northbound Route 92 service was truncated from Duke Ellington Bridge to U and 14th Streets, NW terminus and all Route 92 southbound service begins at U & 13th Streets, NW (U Street station, 13th Street NW entrance).; Route 93 was discontinued March 27, 2016.; 24-hour service for the 92 was introduced on December 17, 2023, which was extended back to Duke Ellington Bridge.; Also see U Street Line, New Jersey Avenue Line and Florida Avenue Line; Replaced by Routes C51 (90) and C53 (92) on June 29, 2025.
96	Formerly known as the New Jersey Avenue Line; 96 originally operated as part of the "U-Street - Garfield Line", between DC General Hospital and McLean Gardens alongside Routes 90, 92, 94, & 98 up until December 28, 1991, when only Routes 90 & 92 were retained as part of the line, while 94 was split into its own line known as the, "Stanton Road Line", alongside the 95 route (which was eventually discontinued on January 13, 2001) between Anacostia Station and Stanton Road, while 98 was discontinued, and 96 was split into its own line known as the, "New Jersey Avenue Line", and truncated to only operate up to Duke Ellington Bridge instead of McLean Gardens; 96 replaced the segment of the former routes 40 and 44 routing between Stadium Armory and Capitol Heights station in March, 1995; 96 was once again extended from Duke Ellington Bridge back to its original terminus at McLean Gardens on June 24, 2007, to replace the segment of 90, 92, & 93's routing between the Duke Ellington Bridge & McLean Gardens; 96 was then later on extended from McLean Gardens to Tenleytown-AU station September 30, 2012.; 97 was suspended since March 16, 2020; later discontinued by September 5, 2021.; Replaced by Routes C51, C57, D24, and D2X on June 29, 2025.
A2	Formerly known as the Anacostia Line (along with A4, A6, A7, A8) until 1991; Routes A42, A46, & A48 created as brand new Metrobus Routes on December 28, 1991, to provide the same level of service that Routes A2, A4 A6, A7, & A8 formerly did to Archives in Downtown Washington D.C., only with the exception that they would only operate late night service when the P6 Metrobus Service was unavailable. Routes A42, A46 and A48 was discontinued on June 26, 2016, and replaced by new late night/early morning P6 trips between Anacostia Station & Archives, as well as extended service on the A2, A6, and A8 Metrobus Routes.; Route A2 skips the United Medical Center Roadway during late nights, passengers wishing to visit hospital must alight/board on Southern Ave.; Route A2 was split into the Anacostia–Washington Highlands Line on June 6, 2021.; Replaced by Routes C13, C15, and C17 on June 29, 2025.
A4	A4 and A5 operated to Archives station (as part of the Anacostia Line) until Anacostia station opened in 1991; The route north of Anacostia is now served by route P6; The A5 covered the A4 route but excluded Fort Drum. It was discontinued on March 24, 2013, replaced by the W5 which ran on South Capitol Street (SB) and I-295 (NB).; Route W5 was separated from the line on June 6, 2021.; Service to the US Coast Guard Headquarters was discontinued on December 17, 2023.; Replaced by Routes C17 and C27 on June 29, 2025.
A6, A7, A8	Destination signs on A7 evening rush hour buses reads "Livingston via Wheeler Road", but it does not serve 4501 3rd Street, SE. It serves Southern Avenue & South Capitol Street, SE instead.; Formerly known as the Anacostia Line (along with A2, A4, A5) until 1991; A7 originally operated between L'Enfant Plaza station and Bolling Air Force Base as the South Washington Line until Anacostia opened in 1991.; A42, A46 and A48 replaced the old portions of the A2, A4, A6 and A8 north of Anacostia station to Archives as of December 28, 1991, when Anacostia opened and Routes A2, A4, A6, and A8 Metrobus Routes were truncated to only operate up to the Anacostia Station; Routes A42, A46 and A48 was discontinued on June 26, 2016, and replaced by routes A2, A6 and A8 respectively.; Routes A6, A7 & A8 were split into the Anacostia-Livingston Line on June 6, 2021.; 24-hour service for the A6 and A8 was introduced on December 17, 2023, which was also extended to L'Enfant Plaza station.; Routes A6 and A7 was replaced by Routes C13, and C17 while Route A8 was replaced by Routes C11 and C15 on June 29, 2025.
B2	B2 was extended from Mount Rainier to Chillum (Eastern Ave & Rittenhouse Sts. NE), during the 1960s to replace the former DC Transit Route K6 "New Hampshire Avenue - Chillum Road Line" routing between Mount Rainier and Chillum, via 34th Street, Rainier Avenue, Upshur Street, 28th Place, Russell Avenue, Arundel Road, 25th Street, Queens Chapel Road, Carson Circle, La Salle Road, 19th Avenue, and Chillum Road. However; on February 19, 1978, the F2 "Chillum Road Line" Metrobus Route took over this particular segment of B2's routing between Mount Rainier and Chillum, once it began operating between Mount Rainier and the Takoma Station. Once this happened, B2 was then truncated back to its original terminus at Mount Rainier.; B2 kept much of its historical streetcar routing the same, only with the exception that it was rerouted to serve Stadium Armory and Potomac Avenue stations when they opened in 1977 and also extended from its previous terminus at 16 Street & W Street in Anacostia all the way up to the Anacostia station in the adjacent neighborhood of Barry Farms when Anacostia station opened in December, 1991.; B2 covered the portion of the former B4 & B5 routes to Barry Farms after the station opened.; 24-hour service was introduced on December 17, 2023.; Replaced by Route C41 on June 29, 2025.
D2	D2 operated to Stadium-Armory station (as part of the Glover Park-Trinidad Line) until replaced by the D6 east of Dupont Circle in January 1999.; Replaced by Route D96 on June 29, 2025.
D4	D4 at first operated to Sibley Hospital (as part of the Glover Park-Trinidad Line) until replaced by D1; It then operated to Union Station (as the Ivy City-Union Station Line) until 2010, when it was extended to Franklin Square.; Beginning June 26, 2016, some extended peak D4 trips end (AM)/begin (PM) at Dupont Circle.; D4 replaced the D3 on June 26, 2016.; Service to Dupont Circle was eliminated on September 5, 2021, which wasded on March 16, 2020.; Replaced by Routes C71 and D36 on June 29, 2025.
D6	D6 originally operated between Glover Park and Washington Hospital Center (as part of the Glover Park-Trinidad Line) until March 1995 when the line was discontinued. D6 was later "reincarnated" to operate as part of the Sibley Hospital-Stadium Armory Line in January 1999 to replace the segment of D2's routing between Stadium-Armory and Dupont Circle that had been discontinued and the segment of D4's routing between Dupont Circle and Sibley Hospital that had been discontinued.; Replaced by Routes D24 and D94 on June 29, 2025.
D8	D8 originally operated between Friendship Heights to Distaff Hall and then rerouted between Sibley Hospital & Washington Hospital Center, via Downtown Washington D.C. until March, 1995 when its routing was truncated to only operate between the Washington Hospital Center & Union Station.; Route D6 replaced the rest of D8's former routing between the Union Station & Sibley Hospital, via Downtown Washington D.C.; Replaced by Routes C71 and D36 on June 29, 2025.
E2	E2 originally operated alongside the E3 & E4, between Ivy City & Friendship Heights station, via Fort Totten station, until June 21, 2015, when its routing was truncated to only operate between Ivy City and Fort Totten station.; The rest of E2's routing between the Fort Totten & Friendship Heights was replaced by Route E4.; Replaced by Route C71 on June 29, 2025.
E4	E3, which operated on weekends only, was eliminated June 21, 2015, replaced by E4.; E4 operates daily as of June 21, 2015.; Replaced by Routes C71, C81 and C83 on June 29, 2025.
G2	Replaced by Route C91 on June 29, 2025.
G8	G8 is a combination of the former G4 & G6 that operated to Lafayette Square (G4) & Avondale (G6) up until March 12, 1995.; G8 had a prior "incarnation" as the Prince George's-Langley Park Line, operating between Prince George's Hospital and Langley Park. However the G8 was discontinued on December 3, 1978, and replaced by Route F8, which was extended from Prince George's Hospital to the Cheverly Station.; Replaced by Routes D32 and D34 on June 29, 2025.
H2, H4	H2 & H4 originally operated all the way between Westmoreland Circle and Fort Lincoln up until September 18, 1999; Then, on September 18, 1999, H6 replaced H2 & H4's routing between the Brookland-CUA station and Fort Lincoln, while the N8 Metrobus Route replaced the segment of H2 & H4's former routing between the Tenleytown-AU Station and Westmoreland Circle.; As a result, H4 was truncated to operate between the Brookland-CUA & Tenleytown-AU Stations, while H2 was truncated to only operating between the Brookland-CUA & Van Ness-UDC Station; H3 was created as a brand new route on September 18, 1999, to operate alongside the H2 and H4 between the Brookland-CUA and Tenleytown-AU stations, replacing the segment of H2's routing west of the intersection of Porter Street NW & Connecticut Avenue NW that was discontinued, and H2 was truncated to operate up to the Van Ness-UDC station; H2 was later extended to the Tenleytown-AU station, replacing the N8 east of Tenleytown-AU station on December 19, 2010; H3 was suspended since March 16, 2020; later discontinued by September 5, 2021.; 24-hour service for the H4 was introduced on December 17, 2023.; Replaced by Routes C61 and D72 on June 29, 2025.
H6	H6 originally operated between the Brookland-CUA station & Kennedy Center as part of the Brookland-Kennedy Center Line from February 1978 until March 1995.; H6 was eventually reincarnated on September 18, 1999, to operate as part of the 'Brookland-Fort Lincoln Line between Brookland-CUA station and Fort Lincoln, in order to replace the segment of Routes H2 and H4 routing east of Brookland-CUA station; Replaced by Route C63 on June 29, 2025.
H8, H9	H8 began serving the Georgia Avenue-Petworth & Columbia Heights stations once both Metro Stations opened in September, 1999; H9 only operated when Archbishop Carroll High School is open.; Replaced by Route D74 on June 29, 2025.
K2	K2 operated to Walter Reed Army Medical Center until 2005, when it was replaced by K1 north of Takoma station.; Replaced by Route C77 on June 29, 2025.
L2	L1 served Dupont Circle station.; L2 travels skips Dupont Circle via the Connecticut Avenue underpass; The L4 was eliminated on June 17, 2012.; L1 was suspended since March 16, 2020; later discontinued by September 5, 2021.; L2 late-night service to Bethesda and Friendship Heights stations was eliminated on September 5, 2021, which has been suspended since March 2020.; Replaced by Route D70 on June 29, 2025.
M4	Route M4 was extended to Western Avenue & Oregon Avenue on June 6, 2021, partially replacing the E6. The route was extended to the Knollwood Retirement Home on May 29, 2022, replacing the E6.; Replaced by Routes C81, C83 and C85 on June 29, 2025.
M6	Formerly known as the W6 until the early/mid-1990s; Replaced by Routes C23 and C37 on June 29, 2025.
N2, N4, N6	N3 was part of the Massachusetts Av-Federal Triangle Line (along with the former N1) until 1996, when N1 was eliminated & N3 merged with the N2, N4 & N6.; N4 used to terminate at Westmoreland Circle until the late 1990s.; Route N3 was discontinued on June 26, 2016.; Replaced by Routes D90 (N2) and D96 (N4, N6) on June 29, 2025.
P6	P4, P5 & P6 were created to replace the A routes in 1991 when Anacostia station opened, with P5 additionally replacing the B6 between Metro Center & Rhode Island Avenue stations. P4 & P5 later merged with the P6 around March, 1995, giving it the current route.; Routes P1 and P2 were discontinued on June 17, 2012.; Late night and early morning trips between Anacostia and Archives stations was added on June 26, 2016, to replace routes A42, A46 and A48 which were discontinued on the same date.; Late night service was shorten to L'Enfant Plaza station on May 29, 2022.; Late night service was discontinued on December 17, 2023, being replaced by Routes A6 and A8.; Replaced by Routes C11 and D34 on June 29, 2025.
S2	Trips along 14th Street was discontinued on June 25, 2017.; All route S4 service was renamed into route S2 and S9 trips on August 23, 2020.; Late night service was extended to L'Enfant Plaza station on May 29, 2022.; 24-hour service was introduced on December 17, 2023.; Replaced by Route D60 on June 29, 2025.
S9	S9 was introduced March 30, 2009, replacing the former S3 & S5 lines that were discontinued in the late 1990s.; Weekday midday and Saturday service began on June 25, 2017.; Sunday service was added on August 23, 2020, and was rerouted to remain on 16th Street replacing all route S4 service.; Replaced by Route D6X on June 29, 2025.
U4	Formerly known as the M16 (Metro "Mini-Bus"); Originally operated between Sheriff Road to Lafayette Square; Replaced by Route C33 on June 29, 2025.
U5, U6	Runs on a portion of the old M16 (Metro "Mini-Bus"); U6 originally operated between Capitol View to Lafayette Square and 60th & East Capital to Lafayette Square; U5, U6 segment between Minnesota Ave Station & Mayfair was replaced by the U7 on June 24, 2018.; Replaced by Route C37 on June 29, 2025.
U7	Introduced on June 21, 2015.; U7 replaced the V7, V8 service between Deanwood and Minnesota Ave stations on June 21, 2015.; U7 serves Mayfair & Parkside on June 24, 2018, replacing the former U5 & U6 routing.; Replaced by Route C35 on June 29, 2025.
V2, V4	V2 replaced the U2 between Minnesota Ave & Anacostia stations on June 21, 2015.; V4 replaced the V7 & V8 Between Minnesota Ave & Navy Yard stations on June 21, 2015.; V2, V4 replaced the U8 between Minnesota Ave & Capitol Heights stations on June 21, 2015.; New Sunday service was added to the V2 on June 6, 2021, but only operates after 10:30 PM.; Full Sunday service would later be introduced on September 5, 2021.; 24-hour service for the V2 was introduced on December 17, 2023.; Replaced by Route C31 on June 29, 2025.
V7, V8	U8 was renamed V8 on June 24, 2018.; U8 was created to replace the former X2, X4 & X6 routes east of Minnesota Avenue station in March, 1995 (X2 to Capitol Heights station, X4 & X6 to Benning Heights) on the portion of the former routing between the Minnesota Avenue & Capitol Heights Metro Stations.; U8 was shortened to operate between Benning Heights and Minnesota Ave station and was renamed "Benning Heights Line" on June 21, 2015.; Service between Capitol Heights and Minnesota Ave stations is now provided by routes V2 and V4 along the route previously served by route U8.; Routes V7 and V8 were originally named the Benning Heights–M Street Line; Replaced by Routes C21 and C23 on June 29, 2025.
W1	W1 replaced routes M8 & M9 on March 30, 2014.; Replaced by Routes C17 and C27 on June 29, 2025.
W2, W3	Portions of the W2 & W3 operate on the old M18 & M20 "Mini-Bus" routes; Replaced by Routes C17 and C29 on June 29, 2025.
W4	W4's original routing to Bolling Air Force Base was discontinued and the W4 was extended to Anacostia station on June 29, 2003, due to heightened security at the Bolling Air Force Base Gates.; W4 has not operated between Capital Plaza and Deanwood Station since March 24, 2013, when a portion of that route was discontinued. As a result, the W4 was truncated and now operates between Deanwood Station and Anacostia Station.; 24-hour service was introduced on December 17, 2023.; Replaced by Routes C21, C23, and D24 on June 29, 2025.
W5	The A5 covered the A4 route but excluded Fort Drum. It was discontinued on March 24, 2013, replaced by the W5 which runs on South Capitol Street (SB) and DC-295 (NB).; Route W5 was split from the A4 and renamed into the Anacostia–Blue Plains Line on June 6, 2021.; Service to the US Coast Guard Headquarters was discontinued on December 17, 2023.; Discontinued on June 29, 2025.
W6, W8	Portions of the W6 & W8 operate on the old M18 & M20 (The "Metro-Mini" buses) routes; Replaced by Routes C25 and C26 on June 29, 2025.
X2	X2 originally operated between Seat Pleasant and Lafayette Square; X2 was extended from Seat Pleasant to Capitol Heights Station on January 4, X2 operated to Capitol Heights station until the March, 1995 when the route east of Minnesota Avenue station (along with the former X4 and X6 route south of the station) were replaced by the U8.; Early morning and late night service was extended to George Washington University Hospital on June 25, 2023.; 24-hour service for the X2 was introduced on December 17, 2023.; Replaced by Route D20 on June 29, 2025.
X8	Originally Operated between Carver Terrace & Lafayette Square, but was later truncated around February, 1978 to only operate between Carver Terrace and Union Station; Replaced by Route C43 on June 29, 2025.
X9	Formerly known as the, "East Capitol Street Express" Line, which Routes X2 & X4 used to operate as part of. This route was discontinued in the late 1980s and then "reincarnated" in December 2010.; As of the late 1980s, X2 has only terminated at the Minnesota Avenue Metro Station, while the X4 was discontinued.; Midday service was added on June 24, 2018, which is shortened to operate between Gallery Place and Minnesota Avenue station only.; Replaced by Route D2X on June 29, 2025.

=== Routes eliminated before 2025 Bus Redesign ===
These routes were served by Metrobus at one point but have since been discontinued due to either low ridership, duplication of another route, simplification to other routes, combined into another route, low funding, or transferred to another bus company as it would be cheaper to maintain cost and for another carrier to operate the line. However some routes would be reincarnated into new routes for Metrobus. Examples of reincarnations were the 34, V7, and V8.

Route	Terminals			Streets traveled	History
30N, 30S; Friendship Heights–Southeast Line	Friendship Heights station	↔	30N Naylor Road station; 30S Southern Avenue station	Wisconsin Avenue NW; Pennsylvania Avenue NW/SE; Branch Avenue SE (30N); Alabama Avenue SE (30S)	Originally Routes 32 (30S) and 36 (30N); Discontinued on September 5, 2021; replaced by 31, 32, 33, and 36.
30, 34, 35; Pennsylvania Avenue Line	Friendship Heights station	↔	30: Potomac Avenue station; 34, 35: Naylor Road station	Wisconsin Avenue; Pennsylvania Avenue	Discontinued June 29, 2008; replaced by 31, 32, 36, and M5.; The 34 was reincarnated as the Naylor Road Line as a replacement to the M5 on December 28, 2008.
33	Friendship Heights station	↔	Southwest Mall		
34; Pennsylvania Avenue Line	Archives station (10th St & Pennsylvania Avenue NW)	↔	Naylor Road station	Pennsylvania Avenue SE/NW; Naylor Road SE	Suspended as of March 16, 2020; later discontinued by September 5, 2021.
37; Tenleytown–Federal Triangle Line	Tenleytown–AU station	↔	Archives station	Wisconsin Avenue; Pennsylvania Avenue	Discontinued around the 1990s.; Originally operated to Washington Union Station; 37 was reincarnated in the Wisconsin Avenue Limited Line on June 29, 2008.
37; Wisconsin Avenue Limited Line	Friendship Heights station	↔	Archives station (AM End); Federal Triangle (10th St & Pennsylvania Ave NW) (PM Start)	Wisconsin Avenue NW; Massachusetts Avenue NW; Pennsylvania Avenue NW	A prior "incarnation" of the 37 was once known as the Wisconsin Avenue Express Line, running from Tenleytown-AU station to Archives until the early 1990s when it was discontinued.; 37 was then later "reincarnated" on June 29, 2008, to operate as a limited stop Route on the former segment of 34 and former Metrobus Route 35's original routing between the Archives-Navy Memorial & Friendship Heights station which was discontinued.; Suspended as of March 16, 2020; later discontinued by September 5, 2021.
38	Rosslyn station	↔	Washington Union Station		
39; Friendship Heights–Van Ness–UDC Line	Friendship Heights station	↔	Van Ness–UDC station		
39; Pennsylvania Avenue Limited Line	Naylor Road station	↔	Potomac Park (Virginia Avenue & E Street NW)	Pennsylvania Avenue SE/NW	39 was introduced on June 29, 2008, to provide weekday peak hour only, limited stop service between the Naylor Road & Foggy Bottom stations, but was eventually extended to operate to Potomac Park.; Suspended as of March 16, 2020; later discontinued by September 5, 2021.
40, 44; Mount Pleasant Line	Mount Pleasant	↔	40: Capitol Heights station; 44: Stadium–Armory station		Discontinued in March 1995 and replaced by routes D1, D3, and D6.
45; Mount Pleasant Line	Mount Pleasant	↔	Bureau of Engraving	Columbia Road NW; Connecticut Avenue NW	
46; Mount Pleasant Line	Mount Pleasant	↔	Kennedy Center	Columbia Road NW; Connecticut Avenue NW	
50; 14th Street Line	Bureau of Engraving Building	↔	Takoma station	14th Street	
53; 14th Street Line	Takoma station	↔	McPherson Square station (Franklin Square Entrance)	14th Street	Discontinued on December 17, 2017, and replaced by the Route 54.
56	Summit Hills Apartments	↔	Bureau of Engraving Building		
58	Takoma station	↔	Bureau of Engraving Building		
61		↔			
65; Petworth-11th Street Line	Buzzard Point (Half & O Sts. SW)	↔	Fort Totten station	11th Street West	
66, 68; Petworth-11th Street Line	Georgia Avenue–Petworth station	↔	Federal Triangle station	11th Street West (66); Sherman Avenue; 13th Street West (68)	Extended to Fort Totten and Takoma stations and renamed routes 63 and 64 on December 28, 2008.
67		↔			
71; Georgia Avenue–7th Street Line	Silver Spring station	↔	Buzzard Point	Georgia Avenue; 7th Street	Discontinued September 25, 2011. Replaced by Route 74, which also took over the southern portion of Route 70.
72	Takoma station	↔	Southwest Mall		
73; Brightwood-Petworth Line	Eastern Avenye & King Street	↔	L'Enfant Plaza station	Georgia Avenue; 7th Street NW; 9th Street NW; Sherman Avenue	Discontinued on June 25, 2000.
74	Soldiers Home	↔	Fort Lesley J. McNair		Reincarnated into the "Convention Center-Southwest Waterfront Line" in 2011
76	Rock Creek Cemetery	↔			
77; Georgia Avenue Express Line	Silver Spring station	↔	Waterside Mall		
91; Garfield–Owl Line	McLean Gardens	↔	Alabama Avenue & Stanton Road	Florida Avenue; North Capitol Street; Good Hope Road; Alabama Avenue	Via Union Station and the US Capitol; Discontinued on January 13, 2001. Replaced by routes 90, 92, and 93.
93; U Street–Garfield Line	Duke Ellington Bridge	↔	Congress Heights station	Stanton Road; Florida Avenue; 8th Street	Discontinued on March 27, 2016.
94; Stanton Road Line	Stanton Road (19th & Savannah Streets SE)	↔	Anacostia station	Stanton Road SE	Discontinued on June 24, 2018, and replaced by DC Circulator Congress Heights – Union Station route.
95; Stanton Road Line	Stanton Road (19th & Savannah Streets SE)	↔	Anacostia station	Stanton Road SE; Morris Road	Discontinued on January 13, 2001 and replaced by route 94.
97; East Capitol Street–Cardozo Line	Capitol Heights station	↔	Union Station	East Capitol Street	Suspended as of March 16, 2020; later discontinued by September 5, 2021.
98; D.C. Superior Court Annex Shuttle	Superior Court	↔			Operated as a loop
98; U Street–Garfield Line		↔			Discontinued on March 22, 1981 replaced by Route 96.
98; Adams Morgan-U Street Link	Woodley Park station	↔	U Street station	Calvert Street; U Street North	Discontinued March 29, 2009. Replaced by DC Circulator Woodley Park/Adams Morgan-McPherson Square Metro route.
99; Columbia Heights–Woodley Park Line	Columbia Heights station	↔	Woodley Park station	Calvert Street; Columbia Road	Discontinued on September 2, 2001, and replaced by Routes H5 and H7
A1; Anacostia–Congress Heights Line	Potomac Park	↔	Livingston (4501 3rd Street SE)		
A3; Anacostia–Congress Heights Line	Anacostia station	↔	Shipley Terrace	Martin Luther King Avenue SE; Mississippi Avenue SE (A2); Atlantic Street SE; Southern Avenue	Discontinued on January 13, 2001 and replaced by route A2.
A5; Anacostia-Fort Drum Line	D.C. Village (North Parking Lot)	↔	Anacostia station	Martin Luther King Jr Ave	Discontinued on March 24, 2013, replaced by W5.
A9; Martin Luther King Jr Ave Limited Line	Livingston (4501 3rd Street SE)	↔	McPherson Square station (Franklin Square Entrance)	Martin Luther King Jr Ave SE	A9 is now a MetroExtra Bus service as of March 24, 2013.; Suspended as of March 16, 2020; later discontinued by September 5, 2021.
A34; Anacostia High School/Kramer Junior High School Line		↔			
A42, A46, A48; Anacostia-Congress Heights Line	A42 Southern Avenue station; A46, A48 4501 3rd Street SE	↔	Archives station (10th Street & Pennsylvania Avenue NW)	Martin Luther King Avenue SE; Mississippi Avenue SE, Atlantic Street SE (A42); Wheeler Road SE (A46); South Capitol Street (A48)	Discontinued on June 26, 2016, replaced by A2, A6, A8 & P6.
B4, B5; Barry Farm Line	B4 Fort Stanton; B5 Barry Farm	↔	Mount Rainier Terminal		
B6	Metro Center	↔	Rhode Island Avenue		Replaced by the P5 Route on December 28, 1991 (which was discontinued in 1995) and replaced by the P6 Route
B7, B8	Carter Barron Amphitheatre	↔	B7 Southwest Mall; B8 Federal Triangle		
B9	Carter Barron Amphitheatre	↔	Federal Triangle		
B8, B9; Fort Lincoln Shuttle Line	B8 Fort Lincoln (Petersburg Apartment Complex); B9 Colmar Manor (Newark Rd & 40th Pl)	↔	Rhode Island Avenue station	Bladensburg Road (B9); Franklin Street NE; Rhode Island Avenue NE	B8 originally operated between the Rhode Island Avenue station & Fort Lincoln, while B9 originally operated between only Fort Lincoln & Colmar Manor; B9 was later extended from Fort Lincoln, to operate up to the Rhode Island Avenue Station via B8's routing, in 1999; The B9 was extended to Wesley House Senior Citizen Residence on June 28, 2009.; Suspended as of March 16, 2020; later discontinued by September 5, 2021.
B41; Backus Middle School Line	Backus Middle School	↔	Brentwood Village (Saratoga Avenue & Brentwood Road)	South Dakota Avenue	Discontinued on September 2, 2001
B51; Brookland and Bunker Hill (Elementary) School Line		↔			Discontinued on August 21, 2016.
B52, B53; Brookland and Bunker Hill (Elementary) School Line	Michigan Park (12th Street & South Dakota Avenue NE) (AM); Michigan Park (Buchanan Street & 12th Street NE) PM)	↔	B52 Brookland Elementary School; B53 Bunker Hill Elementary School	12th Street	
C40; Capitol Hill Cluster Line	Peabody Elementary School (E Street & 12th Street SE)	↔	Watkins Elementary School	Pennsylvania Avenue SE	Discontinued on August 21, 2016.
D1; Glover Park–Franklin Square Line	Glover Park (41st St & Davis Pl NW)	↔	McPherson Square station (Franklin Square Entrance)	Q Street NW; K Street NW; 13th Street NW	D1 was created as a brand new route in 1999 to replace the portion of D4's former routing between Union Station & Glover Park that had been discontinued when D4 was truncated to only operate between Ivy City and Union Station; D1 operated all the way between Ivy City & Glover Park until 2010 when its route was truncated to only operate between Federal Triangle & Glover Park.; D1 was shortened even further from Federal Triangle to only Franklin Square on June 26, 2016.; Suspended as of March 16, 2020; later discontinued by September 5, 2021.
D1, D3, D9; Glover Park–Trinidad Line		↔			
D3; Ivy City-Dupont Circle	Ivy City (16th Street & New York Avenue NE)	↔	Georgetown (35th St. & Reservoir Rd. NW)	K Street NW/NE	Discontinued on June 26, 2016.
D5, D6; Loughboro–Chevy Chase Line		↔			
D5; MacArthur Boulevard–Georgetown Line	Little Flower Church; Sangamore Road (Bethesda, MD)	↔	Farragut Square	Sangamore Road; MacArthur Boulevard NW; M Street NW; Pennsylvania Avenue NW	Suspended as of March 16, 2020; later discontinued by September 5, 2021.
D9; MacArthur Boulevard-Federal Triangle Line	Sangamore, Maryland	↔	Farragut Square		
E3; Military Road–Crosstown Line	Friendship Heights station	↔	Ivy City (New York Ave & Fenwick St NE)	Military Road NW; Kennedy Street NW; Missouri Avenue NW; Riggs Road NE; South Dakota Avenue NE; 18th Street NE	Discontinued on June 21, 2015, replaced by E2 and E4.
E5	Ivy City	↔	Alta Vista, Bethesda MD	Military Road	
E6	Lafayette Square	↔	Lewisdale, Maryland		
E6; Chevy Chase Line	Knollwood (Knollwood Retirement Home)	↔	Friendship Heights station	Western Avenue; McKinley Street NW	Suspended as of March 16, 2020; later discontinued by September 5, 2021, and replaced by Route M4 on June 6, 2021.
E7, E8; Chevy Chase Line	Knollwood (Knollwood Retirement Home) (E8); Pinehurst (E7)	↔	Friendship Heights station (E8); Tenleytown–AU station (E7)		
E8		↔			
E32; Eastern High School Line	Eastern High School	↔	Benning Road station	Capitol Street	
G4, G6	Lafayette Square	↔			Discontinued in March, 1995 and replaced by the G8 Route
G9; Rhode Island Avenue Limited Line	McPherson Square station (Franklin Square entrance)	↔	Mount Rainier Terminal (Rhode Island Ave & 34th Street)	Rhode Island Avenue NW/NE	G9 was introduced on March 20, 2017.; G9 had a prior incarnation as the Queens Chapel Road Line along with the former G7 until February 6, 1978, when both routes were discontinued and replaced by the R2, R4, R6, and R7; G9 temporarily had daily service on July 21, 2018, to September 3, 2018, due to Rhode Island Avenue & Brookland-CUA being shut down.; Suspended as of March 16, 2020; later discontinued by September 5, 2021.
H1; Brookland–Potomac Park Line	Brookland–CUA station	↔	West Potomac Park (17th & C Streets NW)	Michigan Avenue NW/NE; Columbia Road NW; Irving Street NW (to Brookland); 23rd Street NW	H1 was created as a brand new route on September 18, 1999, to operate as a "reincarnation" of the former H6 "Brookland - Kennedy Center" Line that was discontinued around March 1995; Suspended as of March 16, 2020; later discontinued by September 5, 2021.
H3; Crosstown Line	Tenleytown–AU station	↔	Brookland–CUA station	Wisconsin Avenue; Porter Street NW; Columbia Road NW (to Tenleytown); Irving Street NW (to Brookland); Michigan Avenue NW/NE	Suspended as of March 16, 2020; later discontinued by September 5, 2021.
H5, H7; Mount Pleasant-Adams Morgan Line	Columbia Heights station	↔	Woodley Park station	Calvert Street; Porter Street; Connecticut Avenue; Columbia Road; Mount Pleasant Street	Operated as loops (H5 clockwise, H7 counter clockwise); Discontinued on September 24, 2006.
H31; Harris Elementary School Line	Harris Elementary School (53rd Street & D Street SE)	↔	Benning Heights (Benning Road & Hanna Place (AM); Benning Heights (H Street & Southern Avenue SE) (PM)		Discontinued on September 2, 2001
J43; Janney Elementary School Line	Friendship Heights (Military Road & 43rd Street NW)	↔	Janney Elementary School	47th Street NW; Fessenden Street	Discontinued on September 2, 2001
K1; Takoma-Walter Reed Line	Walter Reed Army Medical Center	↔	Takoma station	Butternut Street NW, Blair Road NW; Georgia Avenue NW	Discontinued September 25, 2011, due to the BRAC plan for relocation of Walter Reed Army Medical Center facilities to Maryland and Virginia.
K4	Metro Center station	↔	Fort Totten station	Butternut Street NW, Blair Road NW; Georgia Avenue NW	Route originally operated to Chillum, Maryland
K8	Takoma station	↔	Fort Totten station		
L1; Connecticut Avenue Line	Chevy Chase Circle	↔	West Potomac Park (17th & C Streets NW)	Connecticut Avenue NW; 23rd Street NW	Suspended as of March 16, 2020; later discontinued by September 5, 2021.
L3, L5, L9; Connecticut Avenue Line	Potomac Park	↔			
L4; Connecticut Avenue Line	Dupont Circle	↔	Chevy Chase Circle	Connecticut Avenue; 23rd Street	Discontinued on June 17, 2012.
L6	Wheaton station	↔	Federal Triangle		
L30, L31, L32, L33, L34; Oyster/Lewis Elementary School Line		↔			Discontinued on September 2, 2001.
M1; Suitland Road Line		↔			
M1, M2; Capitol Hill-Fourth Street Line	Washington Union Station	↔	M1 Harry S Truman Building; M2 Buzzard Point		
M2; Fairfax Village-Naylor Road Line	Fairfax Village (38th St & Alabama Av SE)	↔	Naylor Road station	Southern Avenue	Introduced on January 13, 2001.; Discontinued on March 30, 2014.
M3		↔			
M5; Naylor Road Line	Naylor Road station	↔	Eastern Market station	Naylor Road	Renamed Route 34 on December 28, 2008.
M8; Downtowner Line		↔			
M8, M9; Congress Heights Shuttle	Washington Highlands	↔	Congress Heights station	Alabama Avenue SE; Wheeler Road SE	Introduced on January 13, 2001.; Discontinued on March 30, 2014, replaced by W1.
M12; Kennedy Center–Georgetown Line	Kennedy Center	↔	Georgetown	Wisconsin Avenue NW	Discontinued on January 22, 1984.
M14	L'Enfant Plaza station	↔	Half and O streets SE		Discontinued on January 22, 1984.
M16; Mayfair–River Terrace Loop	Minnesota Avenue station	↔	Mayfair		Replaced by route U5 and U6
M18, M20; Garfield Shuttle Line	Southeast Washington	↔	Naylor and Good Hope Road		Also known as Metro "Mini-Bus".
M20, M22; Southeast Community Hospital Shuttle	Naylor Road & Good Hope Road	↔	Greater Southeast Community Hospital	Naylor Road; Southern Avenue	Discontinued on January 13, 2001 and replaced by routes W2 and W3.
M31; McKinley High School Line	Rhode Island Avenue–Brentwood station	↔			Discontinued on June 25, 2017, and replaced by modified P6 trips.
N1; Massachusetts Ave Line	Friendship Heights station	↔	Foggy Bottom–GWU station	Massachusetts Avenue	Discontinued in 1996.
N3; Massachusetts Avenue Line	Friendship Heights station	↔	Federal Triangle station	Massachusetts Avenue	Discontinued on June 26, 2016, and replaced by route N4.
N5, N9; Montgomery Suburban Express Line	Montgomery Mall	↔		12th Street; Constitution Avenue	Consolidated into route N7 on December 29, 1991
N7; Montgomery Mall-Federal Triangle Express Line	Federal Triangle station	↔	Montgomery Mall	Massachusetts Avenue; New Hampshire Avenue	Discontinued on December 27, 2003.
N8; Friendship Heights-Glen Echo Line	Friendship Heights station	↔	Glen Echo Park		Discontinued in the 1990s, replaced by Ride On Route 29; Reincarnated into the Van Ness-Wesley Heights Line in the late 1990s to early 2000s.
N8; Tenleytown–Glover Park Line	Glover Park (41st St & Davis Pl NW)	↔	Van Ness–UDC station	Massachusetts Avenue NW; Yuma Street NW	Discontinued September 25, 2011.; Formerly known as the Van Ness-Wesley Heights Line which ran into Glover Park.
N11		↔			
N22; Navy Yard Shuttle Line	Navy Yard–Ballpark station	↔	Washington Union Station	Pennsylvania Avenue	Discontinued March 29, 2009. Replaced by DC Circulator Union Station - Navy Yard Metro route.
P1; Petworth-Potomac Park Line	Petworth	↔	West Potomac Park		Renamed route 61 in 1991
P2, P7; Petworth Line	Petworth	↔	P2: Takoma station; P7: Federal Triangle		Renamed route 62 and 67 in 1991
P1, P2; Anacostia–Eckington Line	Anacostia station	↔	P1: Potomac Park/State Dept; P2: Archives station	P1: Constitution Avenue; P2: Pennsylvania Avenue	Discontinued on June 17, 2012, replaced by P6.
P4; Anacostia–Eckington Line	Federal Triangle	↔	Decatur & Illinois		
P4, P5; 11th Street Line	Anacostia station	↔			Merged into the P6 around the late 1990s
P5, P7; Takoma–Petworth Line	Takoma station	↔			Now Route 64
P61		↔			
S1; 16th Street–Potomac Park Line	16th Street & Colorado Avenue NW	↔	West Potomac Park (Virginia Ave & E St NW)	16th Street NW; 18th Street NW (to 16th & Colorado); 19th Street NW (to Potomac Park)	Suspended as of March 18, 2020; later discontinued by September 5, 2021.
S3, S5; 16th Street Line	Silver Spring station	↔	Federal Triangle (10th St & Constitution Ave NW)	16th Street	Discontinued in the mid-1990s; Later reincarnated as Route S9
S4; 16th Street Line	Silver Spring Station (Paul S. Sarbanes Transit Center)	↔	Federal Triangle (10th St & Constitution Ave NW)	Colesville Road; 16th Street NW	Discontinued on August 23, 2020, and replaced by routes S2 and S9.
S6	Summit Hills Apartments	↔	Federal Triangle		
S7	Wheaton Plaza	↔	Federal Triangle		
S8	Takoma station	↔	Silver Spring station		Originally operated to Fort Totten station
S51; St. Benedict the Moor School Line	St. Benedict the Moor School	↔	Capitol Heights station	Benning Road; East Capitol Street	Discontinued on September 2, 2001
S71; St. Thomas More School Line		↔			
T31; Taft Junior High School Line		↔			
U2; Minnesota Avenue–Anacostia Line	Minnesota Avenue station	↔	Anacostia station	Minnesota Avenue NE/SE	Originally operated between Kenilworth to Lafayette Square; Discontinued on June 21, 2015, replaced by V2 & V4.
U8; Benning Heights Line	Minnesota Avenue station	↔	Benning Heights (H & 46th Streets SE)	Benning Road NE/SE	Renamed V8 on June 24, 2018.
V1; Benning Heights–M Street Line	Benning Heights (H Street & Benning Road SE) (PM end); Hanna Place & Benning Road SE (AM start)	↔	Bureau of Engraving	Minnesota Avenue SE; M Street SE/SW; 7th Street SW	V1 replaced the V7 between Bureau of Engraving & Navy Yard Station on June 21, 2015, which was introduced on the same day.; V9 was renamed the V1 on June 21, 2015.; Suspended as of March 16, 2020; later discontinued by September 5, 2021.
V1, V3; Douglass Bridge Line	V1 Naylor Gardens; V3 United Medical Center	↔	L'Enfant Plaza station		
V4, V6; South Washington Line	Minnesota Avenue station	↔	Bureau of Engraving		
V5; Fairfax Village-L'Enfant Plaza Line	Fairfax Village (Alabama Ave & 38th St SE)	↔	L'Enfant Plaza station (D & 7th Streets SW)	Alabama Avenue SE; Good Hope Road SE; SW/SE Freeway	Discontinued on June 24, 2018.
V6; Minnesota Ave-M St Line	Deanwood station	↔	Half & O Streets SW	Minnesota Avenue NE/SE; M Street SE/SW	Discontinued in 1996 and replaced by routes 70, V7, V8, and V9.
V7, V9; 11th Street Bridge Line	L'Enfant Plaza station	↔	V7: Southern Avenue & South Capitol Street, SE; V9: Stanton Road		
V7, V8, V9; Minnesota Ave-M St Line	V7, V8: Deanwood station; V9: Benning Heights (H St & 45th Pl SE)	↔	V7: Bureau of Engraving; V8: Archives station; V9: Navy Yard–Ballpark	Minnesota Avenue NE/SE; M Street SE/SW; 7th Street SW/NW	Discontinued on June 21, 2015, and replaced by V1, V2, and V4.; V7 & V8 were reincarnated as the Benning Heights—Alabama Avenue Line on June 24, 2018.
W1; Fort Stanton–Washington Overlook Line	Naylor Gardens: Gainesville & Alabama (AM) Hartford & Alabama (PM)	↔	Washington Overlook	Morris Road; Martin Luther King Jr Avenue	Discontinued on January 13, 2001 and replaced by route W2.
W3; Defense Intelligence Agency Shuttle Line	L'Enfant Plaza station	↔	Defense Intelligence Agency Headquarters		
W9; Defense Facilities Shuttle Line	Anacostia station	↔	Defense Intelligence Agency Headquarters	South Capitol Street SE	Discontinued on September 24, 2006.
W9; South Capital Street Limited Line	L'Enfant Plaza Station	↔	Douglas A. Munro Coast Guard Headquarters Building (Full time); Livingston (4501 3rd Street SE) (AM Peak only)	South Capitol Street SW/SE; 7th St SW; M St SW	Discontinued on June 24, 2018, replaced by the A4, A8 & W5.
W46; Wilson High School Line	14th Street & Colorado Ave NW	↔	Wilson High School	14th Street; Military Road; Nebraska Avenue	
W54; Woodson High School	Woodson High School	↔	Benning Heights (Alabama Avenue & F Street SE)	Benning Road	
X1, X3; Benning Road Line	Minnesota Avenue station	↔	X1 Foggy Bottom – GWU station; X3 Duke Ellington Bridge	Benning Road NE; H Street NE (X1); Florida Avenue NE/NW (X3); Constitution Avenue NW (X1); U Street NW (X3)	X3 was discontinued for several years before it was brought back to service on June 25, 2000; X3 was extended from McLean Gardens to Tenleytown-AU station on September 30, 2012 but was truncated to Duke Ellington Bridge on June 26, 2016.; Suspended as of March 16, 2020; later discontinued by September 5, 2021.; Route X3's school trip remains active.
X4	Capitol Heights station	↔	Lafayette Square	Minnesota Avenue; Benning Road; H Street NE; Union Station; H Street NW; New York Avenue; Pennsylvania Avenue; Jackson Place	Discontinued on March 12, 1995
X5	Seat Pleasant via Jackson Place	↔	Lafayette Square	Benning Road; East Capitol Street; Southern Avenue; Eastern Avenue	Discontinued on November 22, 1980, once the Addison Road, Capitol Heights, and Benning Road stations opened.
X6; National Arboretum Line	National Arboretum	↔	Washington Union Station	Bladensburg Road; Maryland Avenue	Discontinued on June 24, 2007.
X7; Benning Road Line	Capitol Heights station	↔			
X9; East Capitol Street Express Line	Capitol Heights station	↔	Federal Triangle		Discontinued around the late 1980s.; X9 was reincarnated in 2010 as the Benning Road-H Street Limited Line

== See also ==
- List of Metrobus routes (Washington, D.C.)
- List of Metrobus routes in Maryland
- List of Metrobus routes in Virginia
