= South Capital Street Limited Line =

W9
- South Capital Street Limited Line

Overview
- System: Metrobus
- Operator: Washington Metropolitan Area Transit Authority
- Garage: Shepherd Parkway
- Livery: MetroExtra
- Status: Discontinued
- Began service: September 2013
- Ended service: June 24, 2018

Route
- Locale: Southwest, Southeast
- Communities served: L'Enfant Plaza, Anacostia, Washington Highlands, Bellevue
- Landmarks served: L'Enfant Plaza station, Waterfront station, M & South Capitol Streets SW, St. Elizabeths Gate 4 (US Coast Guard HQ), Bolling Air Force Base (AM Peak Only), Livingston (AM Peak Only)
- Start: L'Enfant Plaza station
- Via: South Capitol Street SW/SE, 7th Street SW, M Street SW
- End: Douglas A. Munro Coast Guard Headquarters Building

The South Capital Street Limited Line, designated Route W9, was a bus route operated by the Washington Metropolitan Area Transit Authority between L'Enfant Plaza station of the Blue, Yellow, Orange, Green, and Silver lines of the Washington Metro and the Douglas A. Munro Coast Guard Headquarters Building (Coast Guard) or Livingston (AM Peak only). The line operated during the weekday peak-hours only providing service from the Coast Guard Headquarters to L'Enfant Plaza. The line was discontinued on June 24, 2018 due to low ridership and the U.S. Coast Guard ending their subsidy for the W9 on July 1, 2018.

== History ==
It originally operated as the Defense Facilities Shuttle Line at first. The line was created on December 28, 1991 in conjunction with the opening of Anacostia station. The new route W9 would operate between Anacostia station and the Defense Intelligence Agency Headquarters via Naval Support Facility Anacostia, and Bolling Air Force Base mostly operating along South Capitol Street. The line provides weekday peak-hour service for government workers to Green Line service without having to walk.

However after the September 11 attacks, security increased all around the United States. In addition, security was tighten at the military facilities at the DIA, Naval Support Facility, and Bolling Air Force Base. The increased security prevented Metrobuses entering inside the facilities. The W9 would now have to stop along South Capitol Street outside the Navy and Air Force gates. This requires passengers to walk up to one mile or ride an internal base shuttle to reach their destinations.

In 2005, the DIA created a shuttle route to serve the facilities which can enter the base and stop at the DIA Headquarters. Ridership on the W9 decreased as of a result as the shuttle provides access to inside the facility unlike the W9 which can only go as far as the Navy and Air Force Gates.

WMATA proposed to eliminate the W9 in its FY2007 budget as the route only averages 98 passengers per day since the DIA Shuttle took over the route. Its performance measures went as follows:

Performance Measures	W9	WMATA Guidelines	Pass/Fail
Passengers	98	<300	Fail
Passengers Rev/Mile	1.1	<1	Pass
Passengers Rev/Trip	4	<8	Fail
Subsidy/Passenger	$9.96	>$4.00	Fail
Cost Recovery	6.5%	<13%	Fail

On September 24, 2006, route W9 was eliminated due to low ridership. The Defense Intelligence Agency's Shuttle would replace the W9. Alternative service along South Capitol Street was also replaced by route W4.

With the construction of the new Douglas A. Munro Coast Guard Headquarters Building for the United States Coast Guard taking place, the Department of Homeland Security began evaluating new connections to the building. The original plan was to enhance existing Metrobus service in the area as the least impactful on the surrounding neighborhoods. It was then later suggested to extend one of the existing routes to the new Headquarters and create a new route going into Downtown.

After construction of the Coast Guard Headquarters completed in 2013, WMATA implemented a new MetroExtra route W9 under the South Capital Street Limited Line. The new route W9 will operate during the weekday peak-hours between L'Enfant Plaza station and the Douglas A. Munro Coast Guard Headquarters Building operating along South Capitol Street with AM Peak-Hour trips extended to Livingston. Additionally, WMATA extended the A4 from Anacostia station to the new headquarters on weekdays and diverted the W5 into the headquarters as well. The new W9 and A4/W5 extension would be funded by the Coast Guard under a five-year contract which will expire on June 30, 2018. The changes were implemented on September 29, 2013.

The South Capital Street Limited Line name was originally under the A9 before it was changed in 2013.

On March 22, 2018, the United States Coast Guard and WMATA began its talk for a renewed contract. However, the Coast Guard informed WMATA that they will no longer subsidize the W9 funding. Instead, the Coast Guard would renew the contract for the A4 and W5 at a reduced frequency instead and discontinue all W9 service. The Coast Guard went into talks for a new five-year contract (one year base, with four option years) which will go into effect on July 1, 2018 to continue the extension on route A4 and W5 to St. Elizabeth's with some frequency reductions.

Funds for the current service levels of Metrobus routes A4 and W9 were included in Metro's approved FY19 budget. The new service levels result in a revenue reduction from the Coast Guard, and a minimal expense impact to the operating budget due to the non-revenue trips associated with the A9. The expenses will be redeployed within other Bus Services. Key highlights include:

- Between March 31 and April 23, 2018, staff conducted public outreach to route W9 riders, including direct contact with Coast Guard employees, notices at each bus stop on the route, a customer survey, and a public hearing.
- Eliminating Route W9 has no Disparate Impact or Disproportionate Burden and thus complies with the requirements of FTA Title VI and Environmental Justice regulations.
- Over 95% of the riders of Route W9 are associated with the United States Coast Guard.
- The Coast Guard will continue to provide operating funds to cover the entire cost of the A4 route extension, and provide capital funding proportionate to enhanced service requirements.

At the time of the proposal, route W9 has been suffering from low ridership averaging 242 riders out of the expected 432. The Coast Guard were also in favor of the already running A4 and W5 which operates more frequent service. The W9 also serves only five stops between the headquarters and L'Enfant Plaza station and an additional three stops to Livingston. Another reason that the W9 was failing was since it did not serve Anacostia station which was closer to the Headquarters than to the route's nearest station which was Waterfront station. According to WMATA, its performance measures goes as follows:

Performance Measure	Route W9	WMATA Guideline	Pass/Fail
Average Weekday Riders	242	432	Fail
Cost Recovery	6.8%	16.6%	Fail
Subsidy per Rider	$13.15	$4.81	Fail
Riders per Trip	13.4	10.7	Pass
Riders per Revenue Mile	3	1.3	Pass

On June 24, 2018, route W9 was officially eliminated after a new contract was renewed by WMATA and the United States Coast Guard. Routes A4 and W5 would replace the W9 to the Coast Guard Headquarters while route A8 and A9 replaced route W9 along South Capitol Street.
