= List of Metrobus routes (Washington, D.C.) =

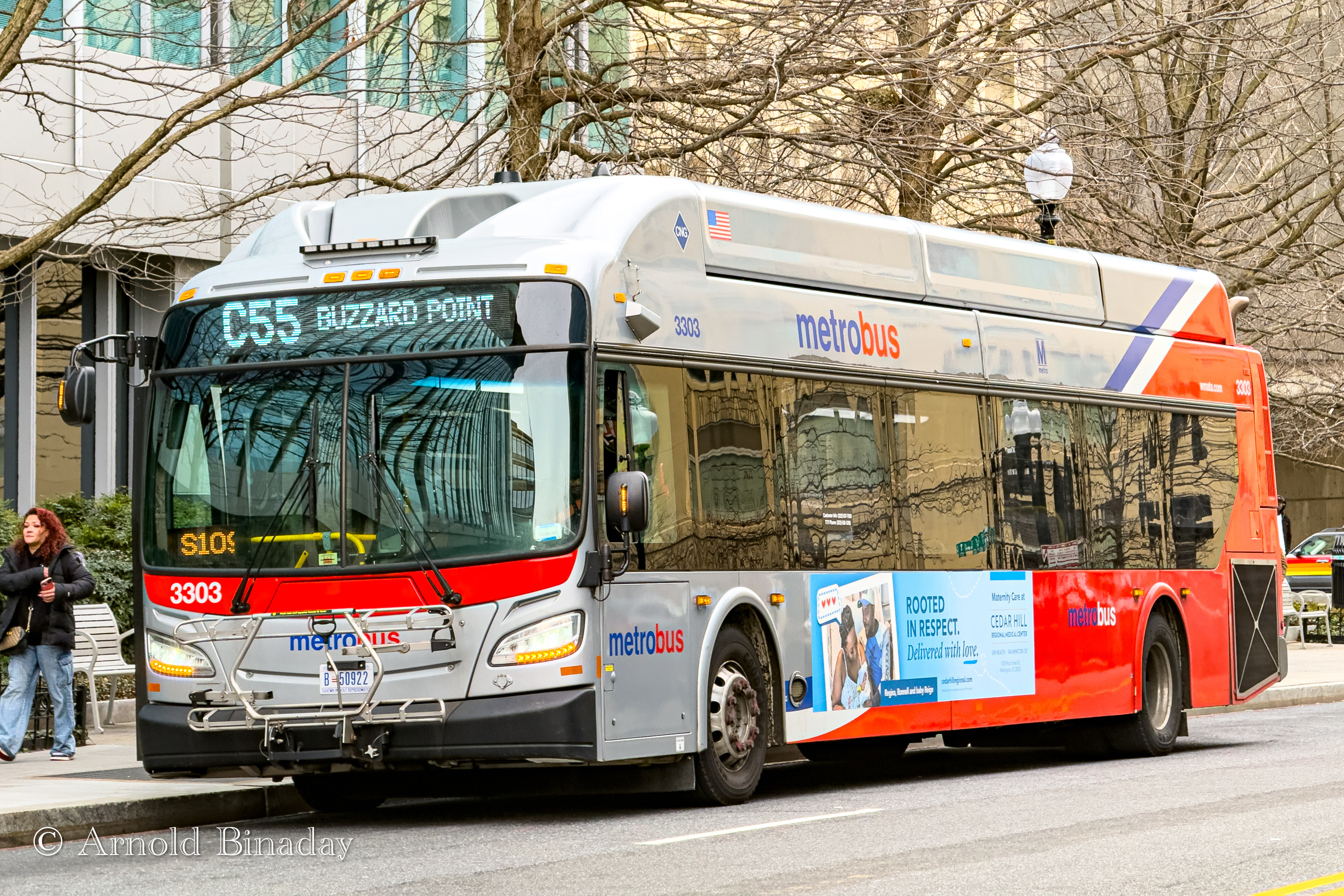
Route C55 a part of the Crosstown Washington DC Routes

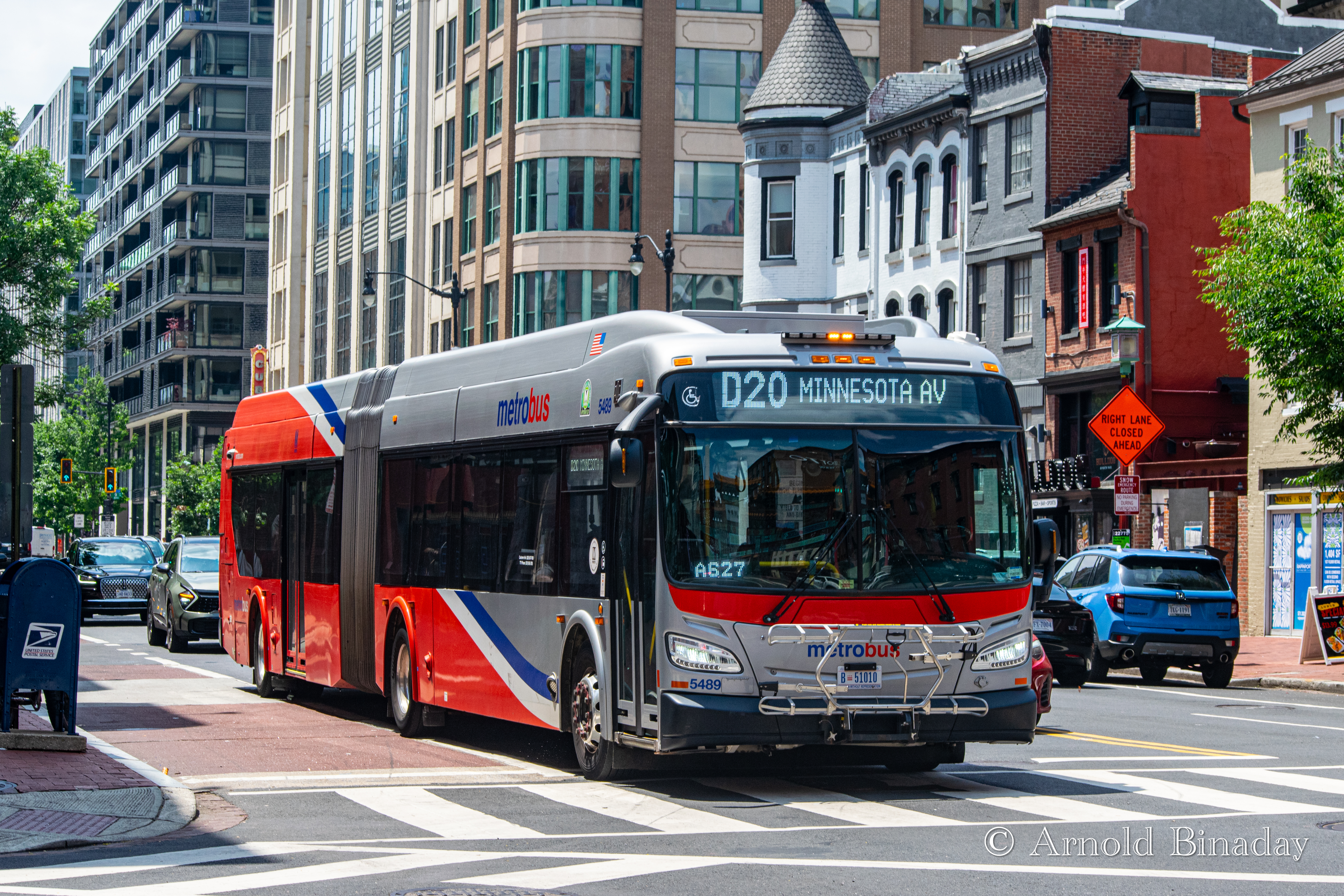
Route D20 a part of the Downtown Washington DC Routes

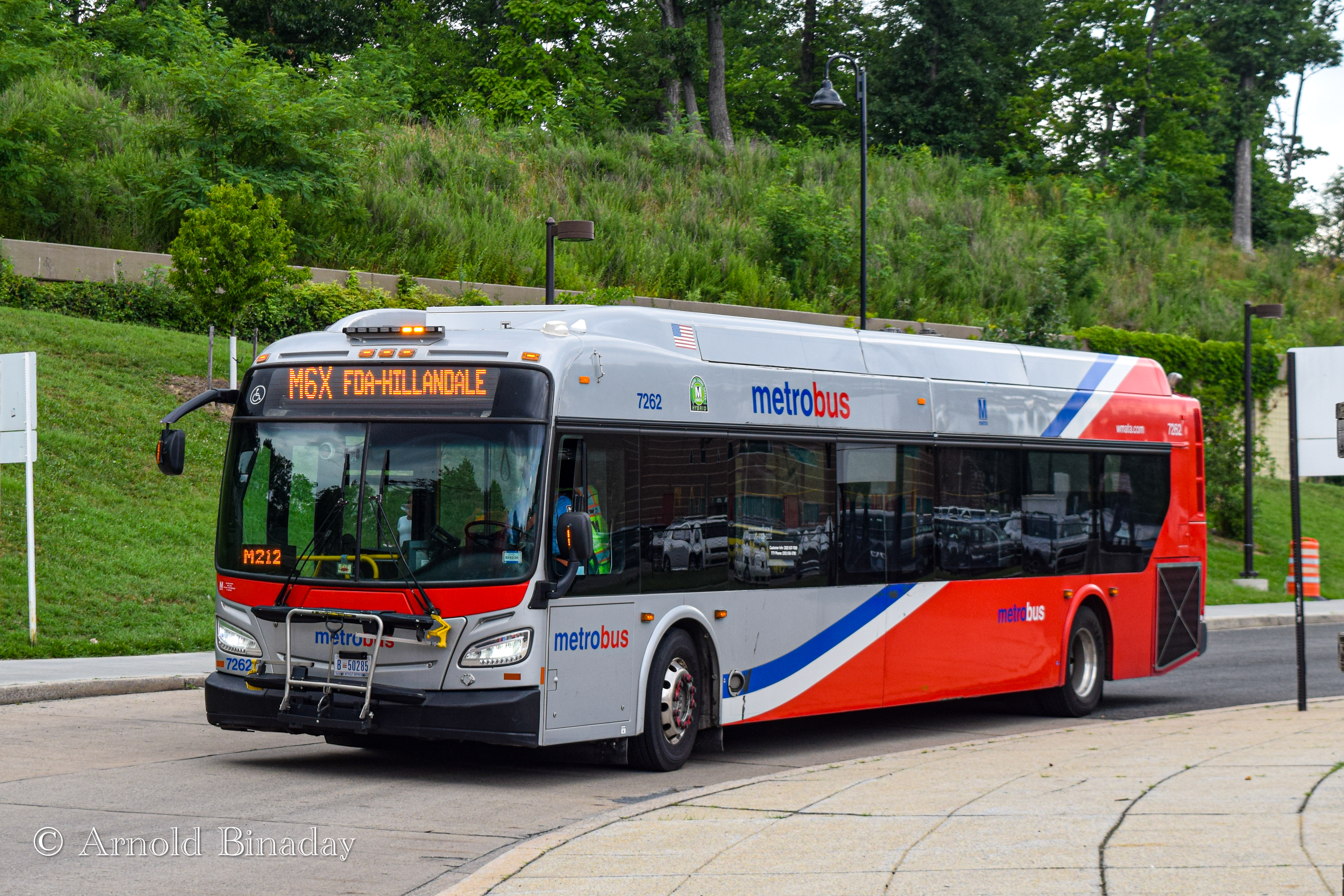
Route M6X a part of the Montgomery County Maryland Routes

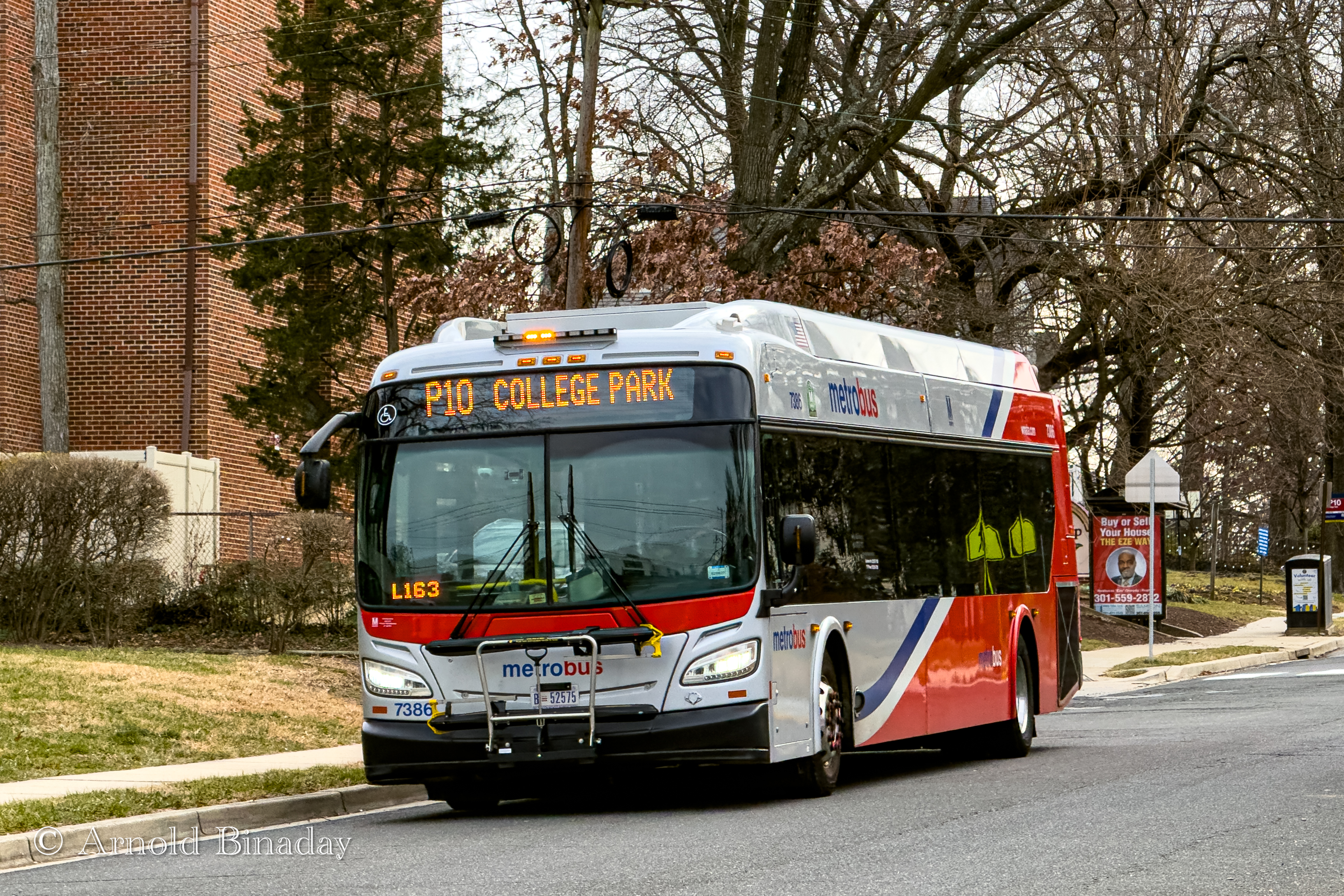
Route P10 a part of the Prince George's County Maryland Routes

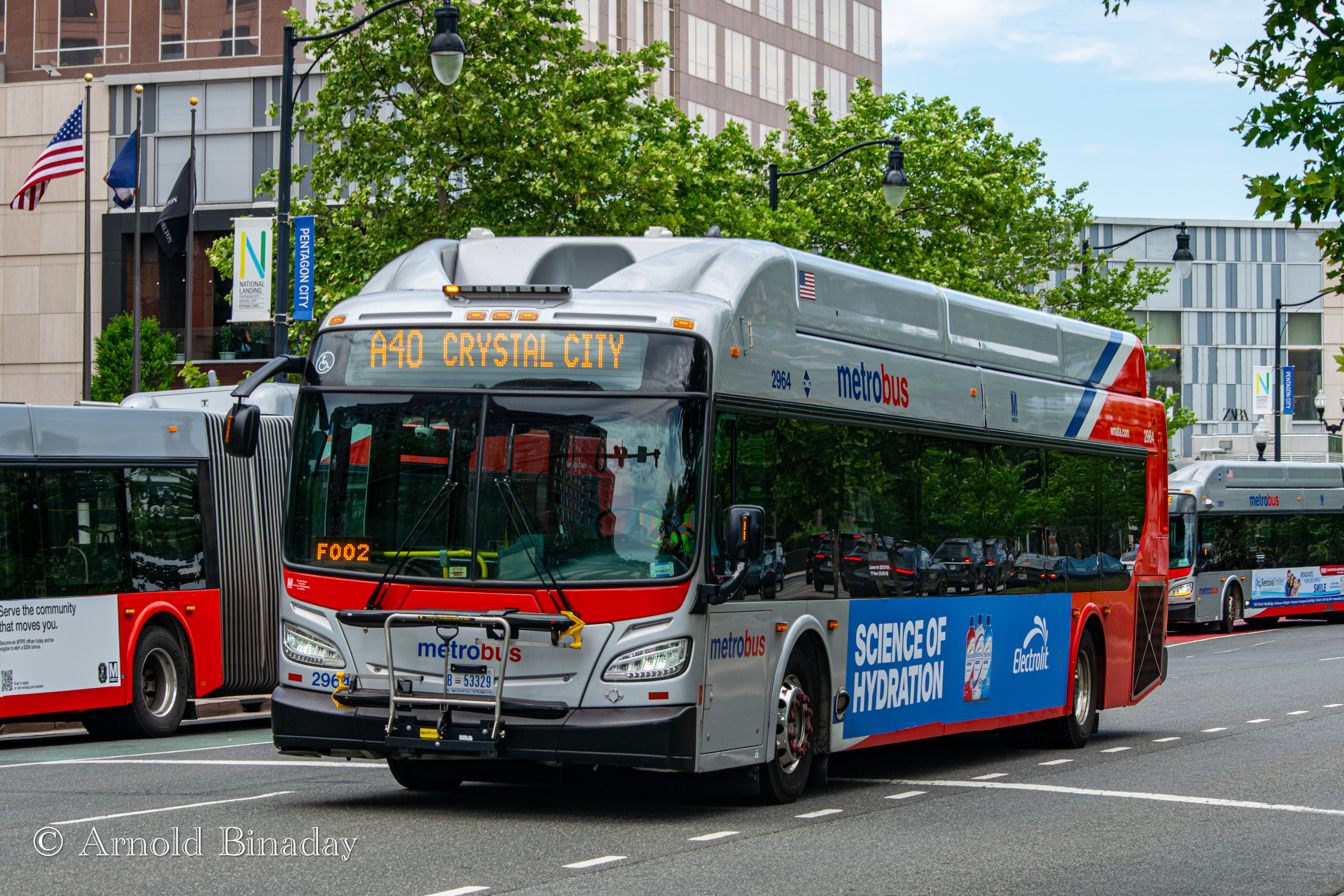
Route A40 a part of the Arlington County & Alexandria Virginia Routes

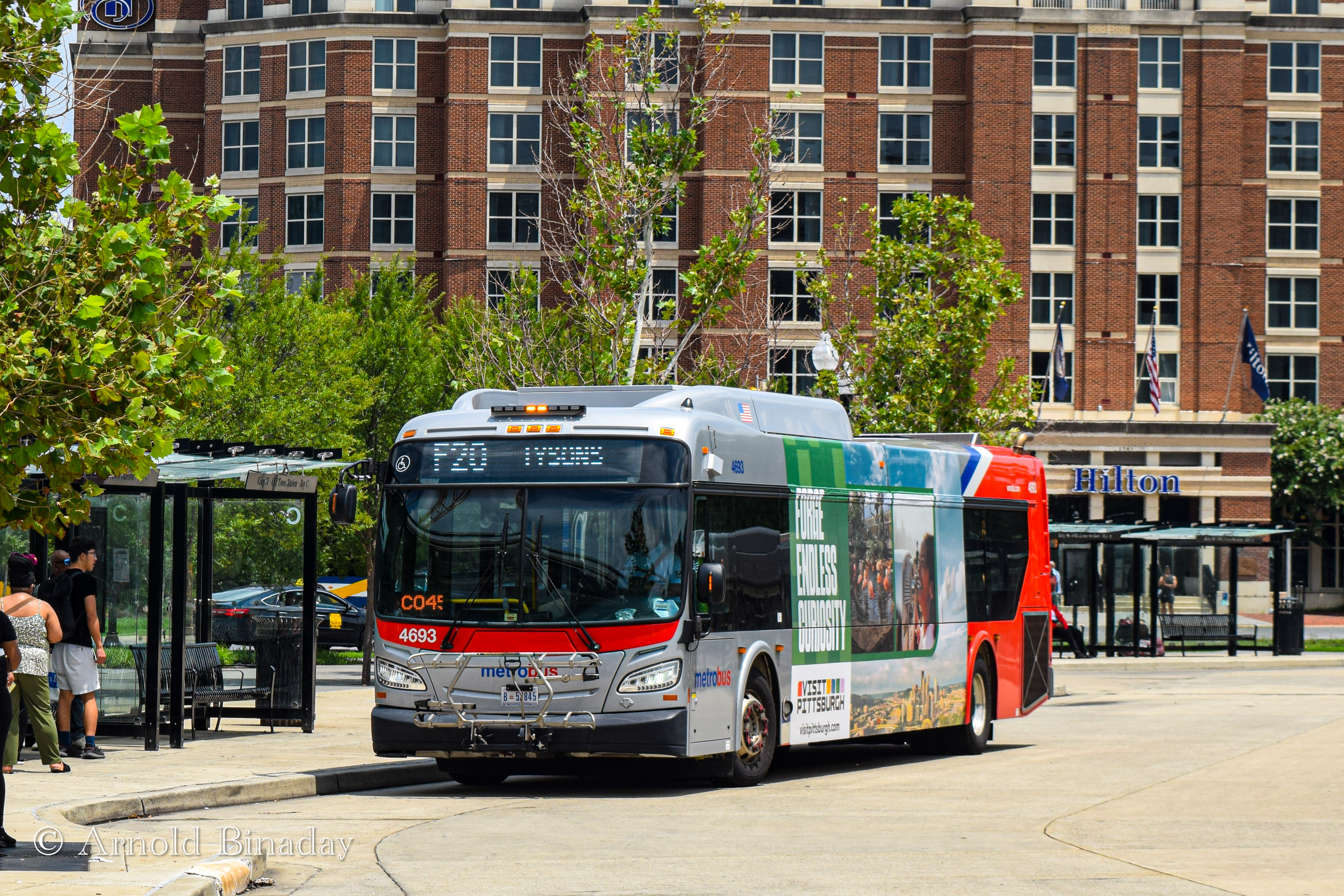
Route F20 a part of the Fairfax County Virginia Routes

== Current routes ==
The list of Metrobus routes has been split by region:

- List of Metrobus routes in Washington, D.C.
- List of Metrobus routes in Maryland
- List of Metrobus routes in Virginia

== Numbering ==
As a part of the BetterBus system improvement plan, the Washington Metropolitan Area Transit Authority (WMATA) created new routes under a new route naming convention based on the locations the buses primarily serve and their service type:

- Buses running primarily in the District of Columbia use the first letters C and D where C represents a bus running a crosstown route and D represents a bus serving downtown.
- Buses running primarily in Arlington County and the City of Alexandria use the first letter A.
- Buses running primarily in Fairfax County use the first letter F.
- Buses running primarily in Prince George's County use the first letter P.
- Buses running primarily in Montgomery County use the first letter M.

If a bus is running a limited-stop (i.e. "express") service, it is denoted by the final letter X.

=== Original Numbering System ===
From 1973 until June 29, 2025, Metrobus routes followed the rules below:

- Metrobus routes in Washington, D.C., have either a two digit number (31, 42, 64, etc.) or a letter followed by a number (A2, S2, X8, etc.).
- Metrobus routes in Montgomery County, MD, have a letter followed by a number (C4, Q4, Z6, etc.).
- Metrobus routes in Prince George's County, MD, have a letter followed by two numbers (F12, J12, P12, etc.).
- Metrobus routes in Northern Virginia have one or two numbers followed by a letter (1A, 16C, 29N, etc.).

Odd-numbered routes are typically part-time variants of even-numbered routes. At one time, odd numbered routes were express routes, but that distinction has been abandoned. Most Maryland and Washington, D.C., routes are grouped by their first digit. When this system was laid out in 1936, the following clustering was used:

Category	Route numbers
Streetcars	10 Columbia Line; 20 Cabin John Line; 30 Pennsylvania Avenue and Wisconsin Avenue Line; 40 Mount Pleasant Line; 50 Fourteenth Street Line; 60 11th Street, Upshur Street and New Hampshire Avenue Line; 70 Seventh Street and Georgia Avenue Line; 80 College Park and North Capitol Street Line; 90 U Street Line and East Capitol Street Line
Buses in D.C. & Maryland	A Anacostia, Martin Luther King, Jr. Avenue (Washington, D.C.), Martin Luther King Jr. Highway (Maryland); B Bladensburg Road, Annapolis Road, Bowie; C Branch Avenue, Central Avenue, University Blvd, Maryland; D Northwest, Suitland; E Northwest, Northeast, Crosstown; F East–West Highway, New Carrollton; G Northwest, Brookland, Greenbelt; H St. Barnabas Road, Branch Avenue, Brookland, Columbia Road, Irving Street; J Silver Spring, Bethesda, Forestville, District Heights; K Forestville, New Hampshire Avenue Maryland; L Connecticut Avenue, Landover Road; M Pennsylvania Avenue, Northwest; N Massachusetts Avenue, National Harbor; P Anacostia, North Capitol Street, District Heights, Suitland, Oxon Hill; Q Veirs Mill Road, Maryland; R Riggs Road, Kenilworth Ave, Queens Chapel Road; S 16th Street Lines; T Annapolis Road, Rhode Island Ave NE, River Road, Falls Road; U Minnesota Avenue, Sheriff Road; V Minnesota Avenue, Capitol Heights, Suitland, District Heights, Oxon Hill; W Martin Luther King, Jr. Avenue, Oxon Hill, Indian Head; X Benning Road–H Street Line; Y Georgia Avenue, Maryland; Z US 29, Maryland
Buses in Virginia	1 Arlington Blvd, Wilson Blvd; 2 Langston Blvd, Washington Blvd; 3 Annandale, Langston Blvd; 4 Arlington Blvd; 7 Landmark, Shirlington, Alexandria; 8 Fairlington, Foxchase, Seminary Valley; 10 Alexandria, Ballston, Crystal City, Pentagon; 11 Mount Vernon; 15 Chain Bridge Road; 16 Columbia Pike; 17 King Park, Pentagon; 18 Burke, Orange Hunt, Springfield; 21 Crystal City, Shirlington, Landmark, Pentagon; 22 Ballston, Fairlington, Pentagon, Shirlington; 23 Crystal City, McLean, Shirlington; 25 Ballston, Mark Center; 26 Annandale, Culmore; 28 Falls Church, Leesburg Pike, Skyline City, Alexandria, Pentagon; 29 Annandale, Little River Turnpike, Alexandria, Pentagon; 38 Ballston, Farragut Square, Georgetown; MWY Alexandria, Pentagon City, Crystal City, Richmond Hwy, Potomac Yard; REX Richmond Highway

== Divisions ==
Division Name	Location	Routes Served	City Section
Andrews Federal Center (A)	7541 Andrews Federal Campus Drive, Suitland, MD 20746	C35, C57, C63, D10, D1X, D20, D2X, P66, P87, P90, P93, P94, P96	Southeast D.C., Southern Prince George's County, Maryland
Bladensburg (B)	2251 26th Street NE, Washington, D.C. 20018-1405	C33, C41, C61, C71, C75, C77, C81, D24, D30, D32, D34, D36, D44, D5X, D74, M60, P15, P16; Late nights: D20, D50	Northeast and Southeast Washington D.C.
Cinder Bed Road (C)	7901 Cinder Bed Rd, Lorton, VA 22135	F19, F1X, F20, F23, F24, F26, F29, F50, F81, F83	Fairfax County, Virginia
Four Mile Run (F)	3501 South Glebe Road, Arlington, VA 22202	A1X, A11, A12, A25, A27, A28, A29, A40, A49, A58, A66, A70, A71, A76, A90, F28, F44, F60, F61, F62, F85	Northern Virginia
Landover (L)	3433 Pennsy Drive, Landover, MD 20785	P10, P12, P14, P1X, P20, P21, P24, P30, P31, P32, P33, P35, P40, P41, P42, P60, P61, P62, P63, P72, P73	Northern, Central, and Southern portions of Prince George's County, Maryland
Montgomery (M)	5400 Marinelli Road, North Bethesda, MD 20852	C87, D40, D4X, D60, D6X, M12, M20, M22, M42, M44, M52, M54, M6X, M70, M82; Late nights: D80	Montgomery County, Maryland
Shepherd Parkway (S)	2 DC Village Lane SW, Washington, D.C. 20032	C11, C13, C15, C17, C21, C23, C25, C26, C27, C29, C31, C33, C37, C43, C51, C53, C55, D20, D50, P97; Late nights: D10	Southeast & Southwest D.C. & the southern portion of Prince George's County, Maryland
Western (W)	5230 Wisconsin Avenue NW, Friendship Heights, Washington, D.C. 20015	C83, C85, C91, D50, D70, D72, D80, D82, D90, D94, D96; Weekdays: D5X	Northwest D.C.
