= Fairfax Village =

Coordinates: 38.8617°N 76.9511°W

- Neighborhood of Washington, D.C.
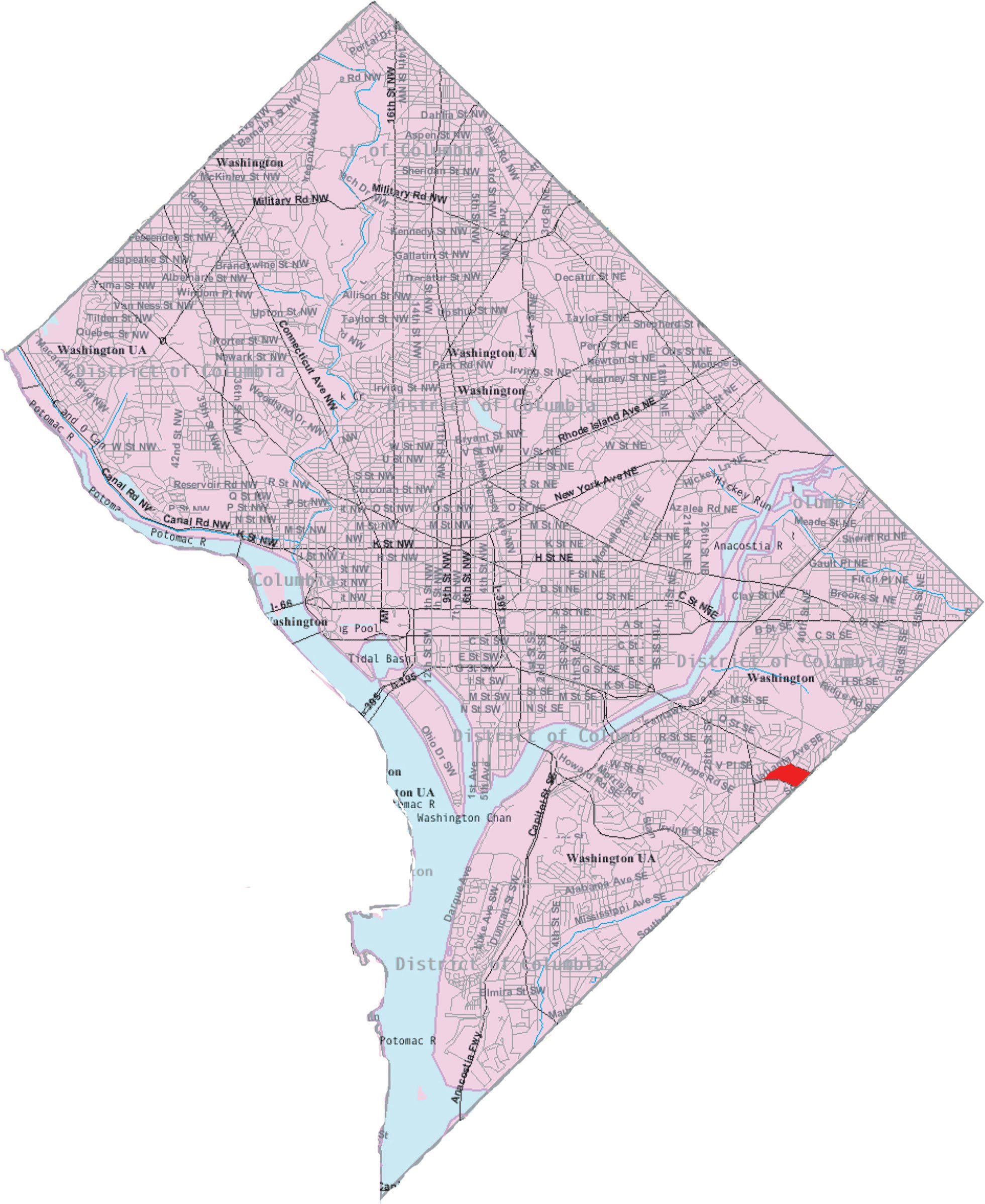
- Fairfax Village within the District of Columbia
- Country: United States
- District: Washington, D.C.
- Ward: Ward 7

Government
  - Councilmember: Wendell Felder

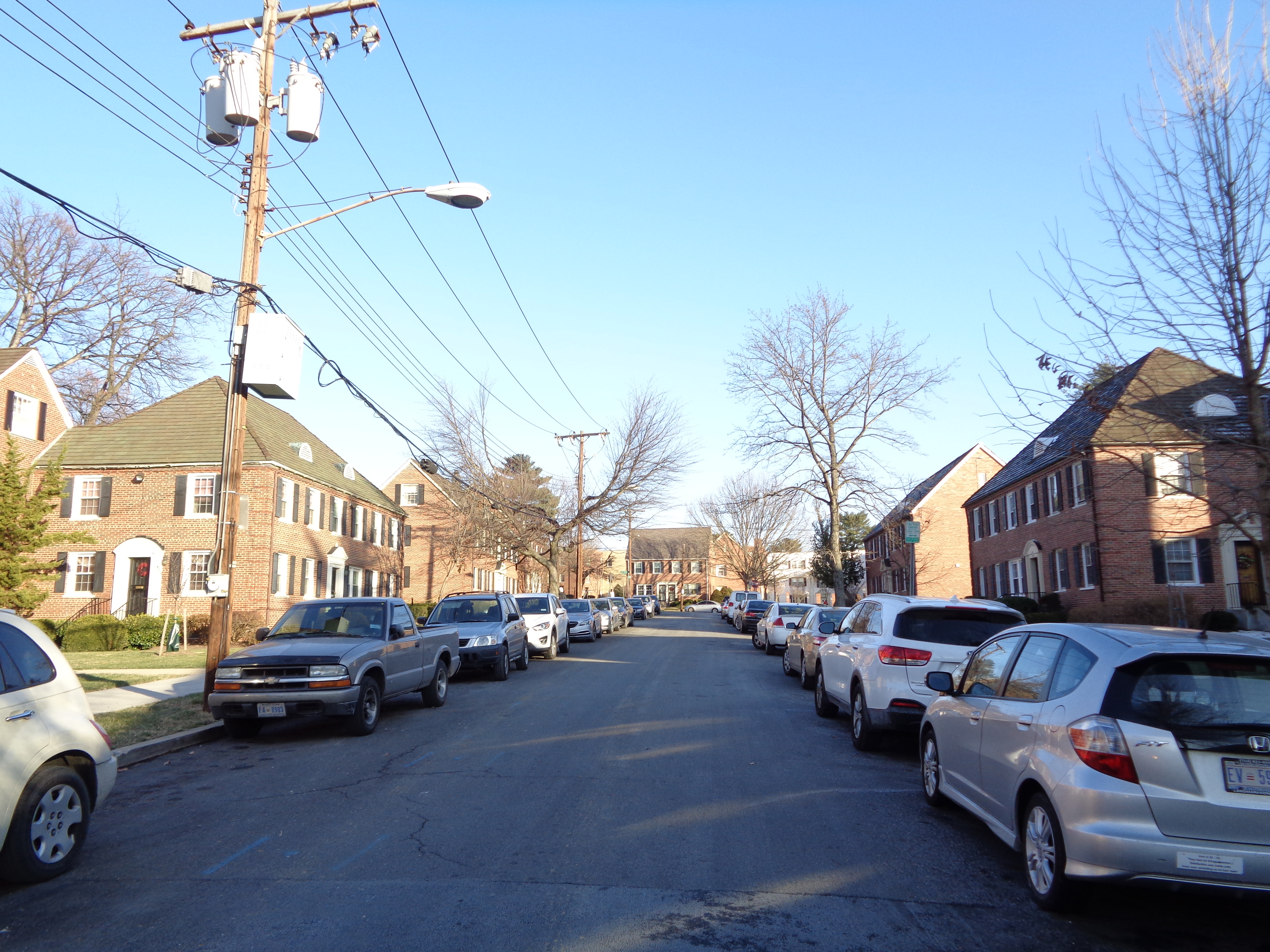
Looking down V St, SE in Fairfax Village, December 2017

Fairfax Village is a small neighborhood of garden style condominiums and townhouses located in southeast Washington, D.C. It is bounded by Alabama Avenue SE, Suitland Road SE, Pennsylvania Avenue SE, and Southern Avenue SE.
