= Douglas A. Munro Coast Guard Headquarters Building =

US Coast Guard headquarters in Washington, D.C.

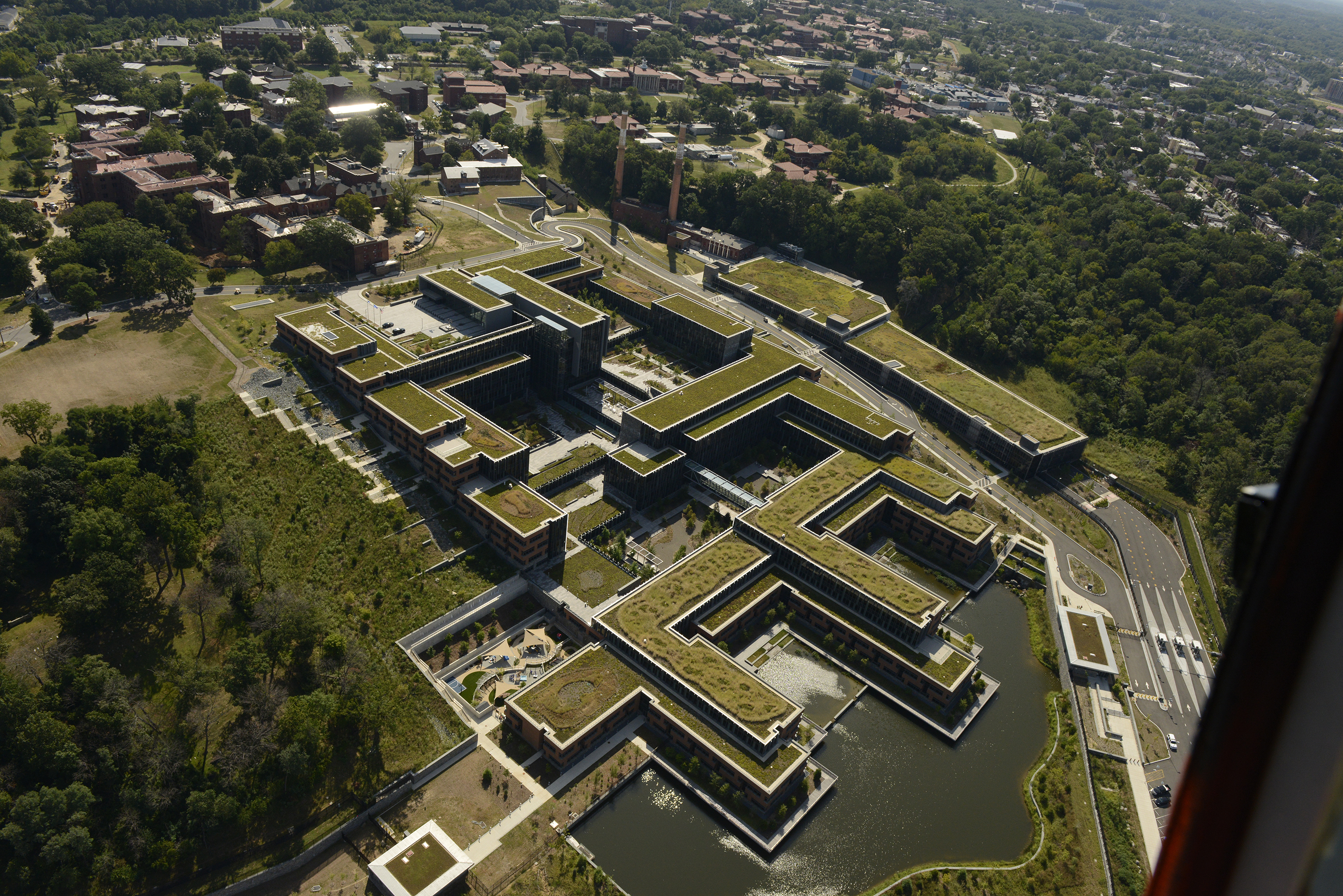
- The building in 2015

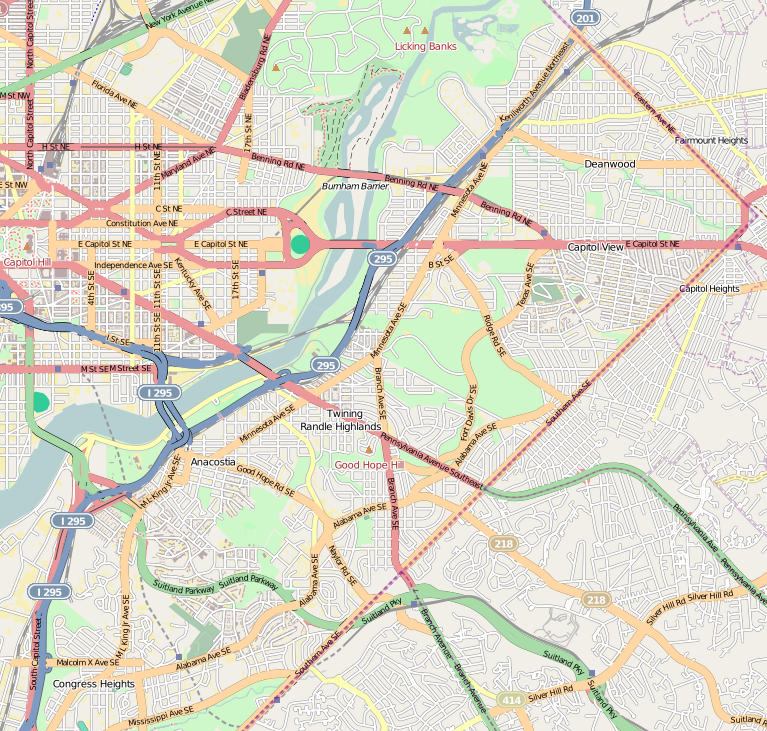
- Location within Washington, D.C.
- Alternative names: United States Coast Guard Headquarters Building

General information
- Type: Government office building
- Location: 2703 Martin Luther King Jr. Avenue SE, Washington, D.C.
- Coordinates: 38.853095°N 77.002944°W
- Construction started: 2009
- Completed: July 29, 2013

Design and construction
- Architecture firm: Perkins and Will; HOK; WDG Architecture

Website
- www.uscg.mil

The Douglas A. Munro Coast Guard Headquarters Building is the current headquarters of the United States Coast Guard and is located in Washington, D.C., on the west campus of the historic St. Elizabeths Hospital. The building is named in honor of Douglas Albert Munro and was completed in 2013.

== History ==
=== Previous headquarters of the U.S. Coast Guard ===
At the time of its foundation in 1915, U.S. Coast Guard headquarters shared space with its parent agency, the United States Department of Treasury. In 1915, the U.S. Coast Guard moved to the Munsey Trust Building, which was home up until 1919. In 1921, the Bond Building became the new building for headquarters. By the 1930s, U.S. Coast Guard Headquarters units were distributed among three venues – the Treasury Annex, the Wilkins Building and the Liberty Loan Building.

In 1942, U.S. Coast Guard Headquarters consolidated those offices into the Southern Railway Building. Between 1963 and 1971, U.S. Coast Guard Headquarters units occupied 800 Independence Avenue Southwest along with the Federal Aviation Agency. In the early 1960s and the early 1970s, the agency also occupied 1300 E Street Northwest.

In 1970, U.S. Coast Guard Headquarters moved into the Nassif Building along with the Coast Guard's new parent agency the United States Department of Transportation. The next building to be headquarters was the Transpoint Building, leased by the General Services Administration in 1979 from Laszlo N. Tauber & Associates, which constructed the building in 1973. The building housed the DHHS Office of Family Assistance from 1980–1986 and served as headquarters for Naval Sea Systems Command between 2013 and 2015.

In the 1990s, U.S. Coast Guard Headquarters units planned to relocate to 1200 New Jersey Avenue Southeast along with the U.S. Department of Transportation, but as the U.S. Coast Guard was transferred to the United States Department of Homeland Security, the plans were scrapped.

=== Construction and tenure ===
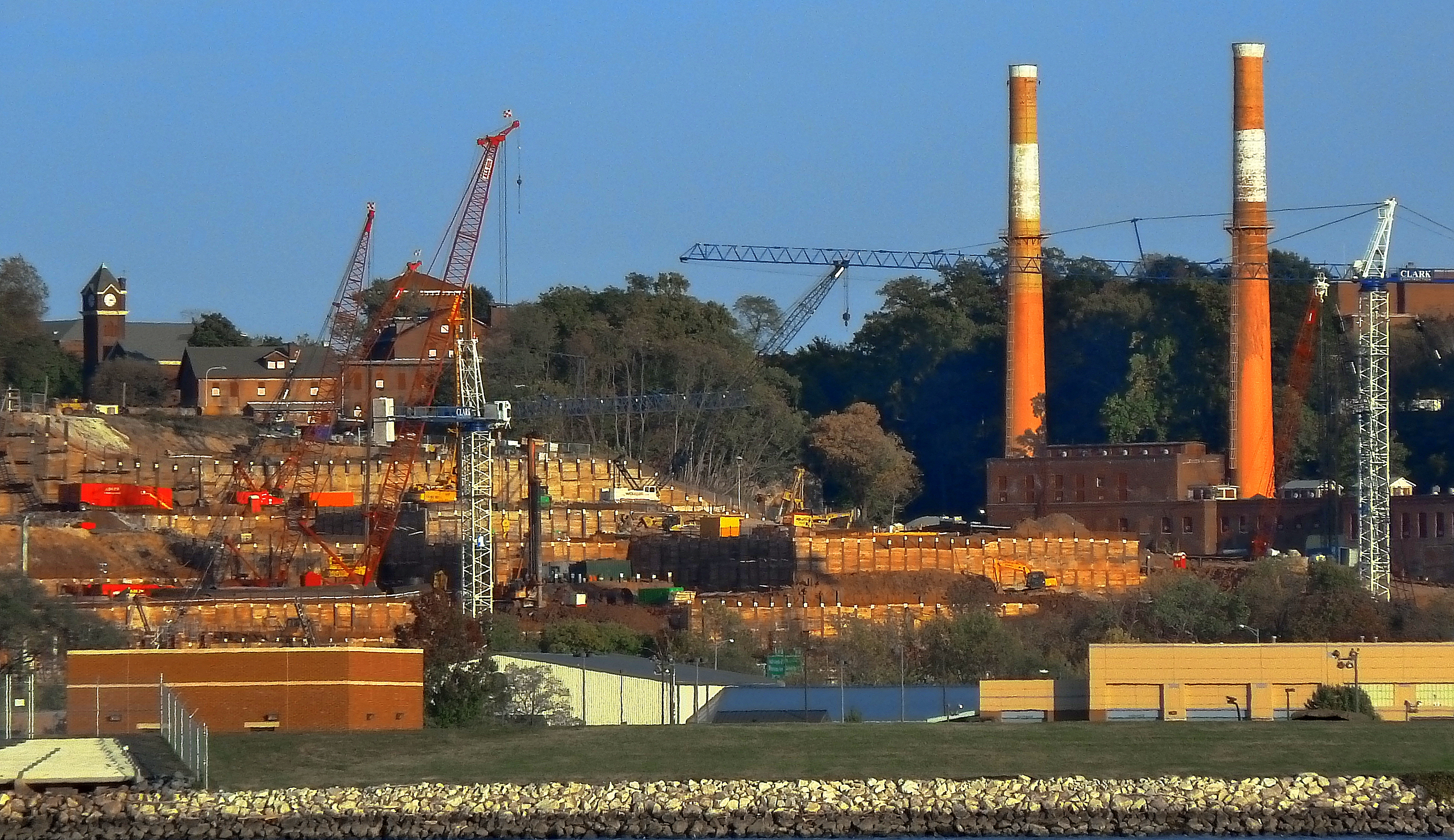
Construction of the U.S. Coast Guard Headquarters Building in 2010

In 2004, the Coast Guard began exploring its need for a new headquarters facility. The General Services Administration, the Office of Management and Budget, and the U.S. Department of Homeland Security determined that it would be more cost-effective for the Coast Guard to move to a secure, federally owned site than to find a replacement lease for Transpoint Building. A new U.S. Coast Guard Headquarters Building on the campus of the historic St. Elizabeths Hospital was proposed in the 2006 federal budget.

In 2009, construction of the building began after receiving funding from the American Recovery and Reinvestment Act of 2009. Budgeted at $646.2 million, it was the largest GSA project at the time.

The building was officially opened on July 29, 2013. From August 2013 to November 2013, U.S. Coast Guard Headquarters units relocated to the new building. Earlier in July 2013, An act to designate the Douglas A. Munro Coast Guard Headquarters Building was introduced and passed in the United States House of Representatives, officially naming the building the Douglas A. Munro Coast Guard Headquarters Building.

In autumn 2015, the Coast Guard's Marine Safety Center, Personnel Service Center, Hearing Office, Legal Division, National Pollution Funds Center, Recruiting Command, and Base National Capital Region moved from various offices in Arlington County, Virginia to the Headquarters Building.
