= Rhode Island Avenue Limited Line =

Bus route in Washington, D.C., United States

G9
- Rhode Island Avenue Limited Line

Overview
- System: Metrobus
- Operator: Washington Metropolitan Area Transit Authority
- Garage: Bladensburg
- Livery: MetroExtra
- Status: Eliminated
- Began service: March 20, 2017
- Ended service: September 5, 2021

Route
- Locale: Northwest, Northeast, Prince George's County
- Communities served: Mount Rainier, Maryland, Woodridge, Langdon, Edgewood, Bloomingdale, Shaw, Logan Circle, Downtown
- Landmarks served: Mount Rainier Terminal, Rhode Island Avenue–Brentwood station, Shaw–Howard University station, McPherson Square station, Franklin Square
- Start: Mount Rainier Terminal (Rhode Island Ave & 34th Street)
- Via: Rhode Island Avenue NW/NE
- End: McPherson Square station (Franklin Square Entrance)

Service
- Level: Weekday Peak Hours Only
- Frequency: 15–16 minutes
- Operates: 6:00 AM–9:50 AM, 3:00 PM–7:33 PM
- Transfers: SmarTrip only
- Timetable: Rhode Island Avenue Limited Line

The Rhode Island Avenue Limited Line, designated Route G9, was a limited-stop, peak-hour-only MetroExtra bus route operated by the Washington Metropolitan Area Transit Authority between Mount Rainier Terminal and Franklin Square. During rush hours, the line operated every 15 minutes, and trips were roughly 45 minutes. This route provided a one-seat ride between Mount Rainier and Downtown DC during the weekday peak hours, so passengers would not have to board the train.

== Background ==
Route G9 provided service between Mount Rainier Terminal and Franklin Square along Rhode Island Avenue during weekday peak hours only. This route provided a one-seat ride between the two points, so passengers wouldn't have to transfer to rail or other buses during peak hours. Route G9 had 15 stops westbound and 13 stops eastbound and operates in both directions during peak hours.

Route G9 operated out of the Bladensburg division.

=== Stops ===
Bus stop	Direction	Connections
Washington, D.C.
Rhode Island Avenue NE / Eastern Avenue	Eastbound terminal, Westbound station	Metrobus: 83, 86, B2
Rhode Island Avenue NE / Eastern Avenue	Bidirectional	Metrobus: 83, 86, B2
Rhode Island Avenue NE / Newton Street NE	Bidirectional	Metrobus: 83, 86, T14, T18
Rhode Island Avenue NE / South Dakota Avenue NE	Eastbound	Metrobus: 83, 86, T14, T18
Rhode Island Avenue NE / 24th Street NE	Westbound	Metrobus: 83, 86, T14, T18
Rhode Island Avenue NE / 18th Street NE	Bidirectional	Metrobus: 83, 86, E2, T14, T18
Rhode Island Avenue NE / Montana Avenue NE	Eastbound	Metrobus: 83, 86, B8, B9, S41, T14, T18
Rhode Island Avenue NE / Brentwood Road NE	Westbound	Metrobus: 83, 86, B8, B9, T14, T18
Rhode Island Avenue NE / 8th Place NE (Rhode Island Avenue–Brentwood station)	Bidirectional	Metrobus: 83, 86, B8, B9, D8, H8, P6, S41, T14, T18; Metropolitan Branch Trail; Washington Metro:
Rhode Island Avenue NE / 3rd Street NE	Bidirectional	Metrobus: G8
Rhode Island Avenue NW / North Capitol Street	Bidirectional	Metrobus: 80, G8
Rhode Island Avenue NW / 3rd Street NW	Bidirectional	Metrobus: 90, 92, G2, G8
Rhode Island Avenue NW / 7th Street NW (Shaw–Howard University station)	Eastbound	Metrobus: 70, 79, G8; Washington Metro:
Rhode Island Avenue NW / 8th Street NW (Shaw–Howard University station)	Westbound	Metrobus: 70, 79, G8; Washington Metro:
Rhode Island Avenue NW / 11th Street NW	Bidirectional	Metrobus: 63, 64, G2, G8 (Eastbound only)
13th Street / N Street NW	Westbound	Metrobus: 63
13th Street NW / K Street NW	Westbound	Metrobus: 16E, 80, D1, D4, D6, S2, S9, X2; DC Circulator: Georgetown–Union Station; Woodley Park–Adams Morgan–McPherson Square Metro
13th Street NW / I Street NW	Westbound	Metrobus: D6
14th Street / N Street NW	Eastbound	Metrobus: 52, 54
14th Street / K Street NW Franklin Square	Eastbound station, Westbound terminal	Metrobus 3F, 3Y, 16E, 16Y, 32, 33, 36, 37, 39, 52, 54, 59, 80, A9, D1, D4, D6, G8, S2, S9, X2; DC Circulator: Georgetown–Union Station; Woodley Park–Adams Morgan–McPherson Square Metro; Loudoun County Transit; MTA Maryland Commuter Bus; OmniRide Commuter; Washington Metro: at McPherson Square station

== History ==
Route G9 initially operated as part of the Queens Chapel Road Line along with route G7. Both routes operated between Highview Apartment Complex in Hyattsville, Maryland, and Downtown DC, primarily on Queens Chapel Road. In 1978, routes G7 and G9 were discontinued and replaced by routes R2, R4, R6, and R7, which now operate between Brookland–CUA station and Calverton (R2)/Hyattsville (R4)/Lewisdale (R6)/Highview Apartment Complex (R7).

=== Proposal ===
In 2014, WMATA announced a study for a new MetroExtra route to run along the Rhode Island Avenue corridor to supplement route G8. A new route, G9, would connect Mount Rainier, Maryland, to Downtown DC for the first time since 1976–1978. The proposal means passengers could board a G9 bus and run as far as McPherson Square station without transferring at Rhode Island Avenue–Brentwood station to rail or another bus. It would give residents of Ward 5 and Mount Rainier more frequent and direct service to downtown, and offer them quicker connections with other major bus routes.

Route G9 would operate along parts of the old 82, E2, and F2 Streetcar Line along Rhode Island Avenue, Logan Circle, 13th Street, I Street, 14th Street, and Thomas Circle. However, there was no funding for route G9, which could not start operations.

The proposal was implemented due to route G8 increasing ridership in recent years, which was the only bus line connecting Rhode Island Avenue and Downtown, except serving Avondale, Maryland instead of Mount Rainier, Maryland. Route G8 also connected most neighborhoods along the proposed route G9, except Bloomingdale, which is served by route 80 but suffers from being notoriously late.

In 2016, Metro again proposed route G9, with the DC Council's Committee on Finance and Revenue considering implementing the route during WMATA's FY 2017 budget. The funding for route G9 would have to come from DC's budget because the corresponding jurisdiction pays for non-regional routes.

Customer feedback was positive overall regarding the route G9, with many residents signing proposals for DC to implement the G9.

At the time of the proposal, routes 81, 82, 83, 86, G8, T14, and T18 were primarily running along Rhode Island Avenue, with 81, 82, 83, 86, T14, and T18 terminating at Rhode Island Avenue station and G8 not serving Rhode Island Avenue station.

==== Approved Budget ====
In May 2016, the DC Council approved the funding for route G9. With the approved budget, residents can expect the route to begin operating as soon as 2017.

=== Route Implication ===
In January 2017, after three years of the original study, funding problems, and customer feedback, WMATA announced that route G9 MetroExtra would finally begin service in March 2017, which was originally announced by Kenyan McDuffie. The route would be funded as a reimbursement project, meaning WMATA is running it and DC is paying the agency for the costs.

The route will supplement routes 80 and G8 during peak hours and will run every 15 minutes and only during rush hours (from 6 am to 9 am and 3 pm to 7 pm, Monday through Friday). The line will run between Mount Rainier, Maryland (Eastern and Rhode Island Avenue) to Downtown DC, primarily along Rhode Island Avenue, Logan Circle, 13th Street, I Street, 14th Street, and Thomas Circle. It would also operate a limited stop segment between Mount Rainier and Rhode Island Avenue–Brentwood station with routes T14 and T18.

WMATA announced that route G9 service will begin on March 20, 2017, as part of their system-wide bus changes. In part of the new route G9, PM peak hour route 83 short trips between Mount Rainier Terminal and Rhode Island Avenue station during the PM Peak hours were discontinued and replaced by route G9.

=== Controversy ===
When route G9 began service, Mount Rainier residents were excited about the new service. However, WMATA made route G9 terminate three blocks away from the Mount Rainier terminal and instead have the route run past the DC border line, and turn around along the Mount Rainier roundabout without picking up any passengers, which stunned many residents. Riders would have had to walk to the Mount Rainier terminal to transfer onto other buses. Drivers are too far from the bathrooms at Mount Rainier City Hall to use them, and G9 passengers don't get the large shelter roofs and benches of the Mount Rainier terminal; instead, the terminal bus stop is just a sign at the curb in front of a used-car lot.

According to WMATA spokeswoman Sherri Ly and the DC Department of Transportation, spaces at Mount Rainier terminal were limited, which were occupied by routes 83, 86, B2, F1, F2, T14, T18, and TheBus Routes 12 and 17. Steve Strauss, DDOT's Deputy Associate Director of Transit Delivery Division, stated that there was a lack of space at Mount Rainier with the layovers of routes B2 and T14, and the through road for routes F1 and F2, which took up most of the space. Strauss said he intended to follow up with WMATA to ask more about the G9's terminus. “We can also confer with our Maryland counterparts on their thoughts about the G9 terminal location,” according to Greater Greater Washington. To terminate at Mount Rainier terminal, route G9 buses would have to terminate on Perry Street and Terminal Roadway, as there would be space to turn back around to go westbound to Franklin Park. If route G9 remained on Rhode Island Avenue, it would have to travel further out to make a U-turn, which can cause delays and scheduling problems unless it was extended beyond Mount Rainier.

The no boardings at Mount Rainier for route G9 could negatively affect ridership, which wouldn't be good for DC residents paying WMATA for costs or businesses that might welcome customers from a neighboring jurisdiction. According to Steve Strauss, DC is open about extending the G9 to the terminal if it doesn't happen at the planning level at WMATA, Prince George's County WMATA board alternate member Malcolm Augustine said that “the G9… will be part of the FY19 State of Good Operations program for bus as a regional route at which point we will have the opportunity to pursue a stop at the Mount Rainier bus terminal.”

=== Proposed Extensions ===
Proposed extensions for route G9 have been mentioned to improve the route, even before the route was created. Some of the proposals were set as follows:

- During WMATA's fiscal year of 2018, according to Steve Strauss, route G9 would be extended to Fort Lincoln, replacing routes B8 and B9, notorious for having very low ridership. However, the frequency of buses would increase to 18–20 minutes, and the WMATA board disapproved of the idea.
- Have route G9 be extended into downtown College Park, Maryland, serving both College Park–University of Maryland station and University of Maryland, providing extra service for routes 83 and 86 between Mount Rainier Terminal and College Park and along Baltimore Avenue.
- Have route G9 extend to the developing Hyattsville Arts District.
- Extend route G9 to the new Riverdale Park Station in Riverdale Park, Maryland.

The extension would make route G9 more of a regional connector that, if it ran frequently enough, might attract a few more commuters out of their cars on this congested portion of route 1. Other proposals were to make route G9 a daily service operating weekly instead of just during rush hours.

=== Later History ===
In July 2018, route G9 was temporarily given daily service due to a major capital improvement project on the Red Line between Fort Totten station and NoMa–Gallaudet U station, which caused that part of the Red Line to close. Buses would run for 15 minutes during peak hours and 20 minutes at all other times between 6:00 am and 12:00 am daily. This service continued from July 21 until September 3, 2018, when the closed Red Line portion was reopened, thus reverting route G9 into a peak-hour-only service.

In response to the COVID-19 pandemic, WMATA suspended all G9 service on March 16, 2020.

On September 26, 2020, WMATA proposed eliminating all route G9 service due to low federal funding. Route G9 has not operated since March 13, 2020, due to Metro's response to the COVID-19 pandemic. By September 5, 2021, all suspended routes, including route G9, were no longer listed on WMATA's website and were eliminated.
