= Brookland–Potomac Park Line =

Discontinued bus route in DC

H1
- Brookland–Potomac Park Line

Overview
- System: Metrobus
- Operator: Washington Metropolitan Area Transit Authority
- Garage: Bladensburg
- Livery: Local
- Status: Eliminated
- Began service: September 18, 1999
- Ended service: September 5, 2021
- Predecessors: H6

Route
- Locale: Northeast, Northwest
- Communities served: Brookland, Columbia Heights, Adams Morgan, Dupont Circle, Foggy Bottom
- Landmarks served: Brookland–CUA station, Catholic University of America, Shrine of the Immaculate Conception, Trinity University, Columbia Heights station, Dupont Circle station, Washington Circle, Foggy Bottom–GWU station, George Washington University, State Department, Potomac Park
- Start: Brookland–CUA station
- Via: Michigan Avenue, Columbia Road, Irving Street, 23rd Street, Constitution Avenue
- End: Potomac Park
- Length: 50-65 minutes
- Other routes: H2, H3, H4, H6, H8, H9

Service
- Level: Weekday peak-hours only
- Frequency: 16-30 minutes
- Operates: 6:25 AM - 6:07 PM
- Transfers: SmarTrip only

The Brookland–Potomac Park Line, designated Route H1 was a weekday peak hour-only bus route operated by the Washington Metropolitan Area Transit Authority between Brookland–CUA station of the Washington Metro's Red Line and Potomac Park. The Line ran south about every 16 minutes during the AM Rush and north every 20–30 minutes during the PM rush. Trips took roughly 50–65 minutes to complete. Like most of the other "1" Lines (L1, V1, X1, etc.), it provided extra service to its daily counterpart during peak hours.

== Background ==
Route H1 ran from Brookland–Catholic University of America station to West Potomac Park, mainly along Columbia Road, 23rd Street, and Constitution Avenue, proving service in Adams Morgan, Dupont Circle, and Foggy Bottom without making customers need to take multiple routes during the peak hours. It was mainly an alternative service for routes H2, H3, and H4 between Columbia Heights station and Brookland–CUA station

Route H1 operated out of Bladensburg Division.

=== Stops ===
Bus stop	Direction	Connections
Washington, D.C.
C Street NW / 17th Street NW (North) 18th Street NW / E Street NW (South) Potomac Park	Northbound stop, Southbound terminal	Metrobus: 3F, 11Y, 42, 43, L1, S1
Constitution Avenue NW / 21st Street NW	Bidirectional	Metrobus: 3F, L1; DC Circulator: National Mall Route
Constitution Avenue NW / 22nd Street NW	Southbound	Metrobus: 3F, L1
23rd Street NW / C Street NW	Bidirectional	Metrobus: L1
23rd Street NW / Virginia Avenue NW	Northbound	Metrobus: L1
23rd Street NW / E Street NW	Southbound	Metrobus: L1
23rd Street NW / G Street NW	Bidirectional	Metrobus: 31, 32, 36, 42, 43, L1, X1
23rd Street NW / I Street NW Foggy Bottom–GWU	Bidirectional	Metrobus: 31, 32, 36, 39, L1, X1; Washington Metro:
New Hampshire Avenue NW / M Street NW	Bidirectional	Metrobus: L1; DC Circulator: Rosslyn – Georgetown – Dupont
New Hampshire Avenue NW / N Street NW	Bidirectional	Metrobus: D1, D6, L1
20th Street NW / New Hampshire Avenue NW	Southbound	Metrobus: D1, D6, L1
20th Street NW / P Street NW	Northbound	Metrobus: L1
Massachusetts Avenue NW / 20th Street NW Dupont Circle	Bidirectional	Metrobus: 37, 42, D1, D2, D6, G2, L1, N2, N4, N6; DC Circulator: Rosslyn – Georgetown – Dupont Circle; Georgetown University Shuttle; Washington Metro:
Connecticut Avenue NW / R Street NW	Southbound	Metrobus: 42, 43, L1, L2
Connecticut Avenue NW / Florida Avenue NW	Northbound	Metrobus: 42, 43, L1, L2
Connecticut Avenue NW / Leroy Place NW	Southbound	Metrobus: 42, 43, L1, L2
Columbia Road NW / California Street NW	Bidirectional	Metrobus: 42, 43, L2
Columbia Road NW / 19th Street NW	Bidirectional	Metrobus: 42, 43, L2
Columbia Road NW / Mintwood Place NW	Bidirectional	Metrobus: 42, 43, L2
Columbia Road NW / Biltmore Street NW	Southbound	Metrobus: 42, 43, 90, 96, L2
Columbia Road NW / 18th Street NW	Northbound	Metrobus: 42, 43, 90, 96, L2
Columbia Road NW / Ontario Road NW	Bidrectional	Metrobus: 42, 43
Columbia Road NW / Quarry Road NW	Southbound	Metrobus: 42, 43
Columbia Road NW / Mozart Place NW	Northbound	Metrobus: 42, 43
Harvard Street NW / Argonne Place NW	Westbound	Metrobus: 42, 43, D32, H2, H3, H4
Mount Pleasant Street NW / Irving Street NW	Westbound	Metrobus: 42, 43, H3, H4; DC Circulator; Woodley Park–Adams Morgan–McPherson Square Metro
Irving Street NW / 16th Street NW	Eastbound	Metrobus: 42, 43, D32, H2, H3, H4, H8, S1, S2, S9, W47; DC Circulator; Woodley Park–Adams Morgan–McPherson Square Metro
Columbia Road NW / 16th Street NW	Westbound	42, 43, D32, H2, H3, H4, S1, S2, S9, W47; DC Circulator; Woodley Park–Adams Morgan–McPherson Square Metro
Irving Street NW / 14th Street NW Columbia Heights	Eastbound	Metrobus: 52, 54, 59, D32, H2, H3, H4, H8, W47; DC Circulator; Woodley Park–Adams Morgan–McPherson Square Metro; Washington Metro:
Columbia Road NW / 14th Street NW Columbia Heights	Westbound	Metrobus: 52, 54, 59, D32, H2, H3, H4, H8, W47; DC Circulator; Woodley Park–Adams Morgan–McPherson Square Metro; Washington Metro:
Irving Street NW / 13th Street NW	Eastbound	Metrobus: H2, H3, H4, H8
Columbia Road NW / 13th Street NW	Westbound	Metrobus: H2, H3, H4, H8
Irving Street NW / 11th Street NW	Eastbound	Metrobus: 64, H2, H3, H4, H8
Columbia Road NW / 11th Street NW	Westbound	Metrobus: 64, H2, H3, H4, H8
Irving Street NW / Sherman Avenue NW	Eastbound	Metrobus: 63, H2, H3, H4
Columbia Road NW / Sherman Avenue NW	Westbound	Metrobus: 63, H2, H3, H4
Irving Street NW / Georgia Avenue	Eastbound	Metrobus: 70, 79, H2, H3, H4
Columbia Road NW / Georgia Avenue	Westbound	Metrobus: 70, 79, H2, H3, H4
Irving Street NW / Warder Street NW	Eastbound	Metrobus: H2, H3, H4
Columbia Road NW / Warder Street NW	Westbound	Metrobus: H2, H3, H4
Irving Street NW / Park Place NW	Eastbound	Metrobus: H2, H3, H4
Michigan Avenue NW / Children's National Hospital	Bidirectional	Metrobus: H2, H3, H4
Michigan Avenue NW / First Street NW	Bidirectional	Metrobus: D8, H2, H3, H4
First Street NW / Michigan Avenue NW	Bidirectional	Metrobus: D8, H2, H3, H4
MedStar Washington Hospital Center / Outpatient Clinic	Bidirectional	Metrobus: D8, H2, H4
Veterans Affairs Hospital / Main Entrance	Bidirectional	Metrobus: D8, H2, H4
First Street NW / Entrance to MedStar National Rehabilitation Hospital	Eastbound	Metrobus: D8, H2, H4
Michigan Avenue NW / North Capitol Street	Eastbound	Metrobus: 80, D8, H2, H3, H4
Michigan Avenue NE / North Capitol Street	Bidirectional	Metrobus: 80, D8, H2, H3, H4
Michigan Avenue NE / Franklin Street NE	Bidirectional	Metrobus: 80, H2, H3, H4
Michigan Avenue NE / Irving Street NE	Bidirectional	Metrobus: 80, H2, H3, H4
Michigan Avenue NE / 4th Street NE	Eastbound	Metrobus: 80, H2, H3, H4
Michigan Avenue NE / Gibbons Hall (Catholic University of America)	Westbound	Metrobus: 80, H2, H3, H4
Monroe Street NE / 7th Street NE	Bidirectional	Metrobus: 80, G8, H2, H3, H4
Brookland–CUA Bus Bay B	Westbound stop, Eastbound terminal	Metrobus: 80, G8, H2, H3, H4, H6, H8, H9, R4; CUA Shuttle: Blue, Green; ACHS Shuttle: Brookland Metro; Metropolitan Branch Trail; Washington Metro:

== History ==
H1 was created as a brand new route on September 18, 1999, to operate as a "reincarnation" of the former H6 "Brookland - Kennedy Center" Line that was discontinued around March 1995.

A study along the H Lines was released in 2013 and they made two proposals to improve route H1. One was to create 2 additional trips during the PM Rush, one at 6:30 and one at 7:00. The other proposal was to make the line operate all day instead of only during peak hours The route would operate in both directions and terminate at Dupont Circle station or Foggy Bottom–GWU station. It was also proposed to increase peak hour service to run buses every 15 minutes and 30 minutes during off hours.

In 2018, the proposal was brought back up. At the same time, it was proposed to reroute the line in the Potomac Park area so it would be changed to operate along Constitution Avenue, 18th Street, and Virginia Avenue to the terminal west of 18th Street NW. Service on 18th Street between Virginia Avenue and E Street NW, and C Street between 17th Street and Virginia Avenue NW, would be eliminated. Alternative service would be provided by Routes L1 and 80. This was proposed due to customers wanting more Crosstown service between Brookland–CUA and Columbia Heights. The reroute was also proposed so that there would be only one terminal stand to avoid complexity. However despite strong support, the proposal never happened.

On March 16, 2020, WMATA suspended Route H1 in response to the COVID-19 pandemic.

In 2020, WMATA proposed to eliminate Route H1. WMATA said they wanted to get rid of the routes that duplicate other routes or have very reliable alternative services, such as the H1. By September 5, 2021, all suspended routes including the H1 was no longer mentioned on WMATA's website. Alternative service is provided by Routes H2 and H4 from Columbia Heights to Brookland–CUA and Routes 42 and 43 from Adams Morgan to Dupont Circle. Riders could also use the Washington Metro's Green, Yellow, and Red Lines.
