= St. Joseph County Transit Authority =

- A Three Rivers Circle Line bus at the Beacon Hospital stop.
- Founded: 2002; 24 years ago
- Headquarters: Three Rivers, Michigan
- Locale: St. Joseph County, Michigan
- Service type: Bus, Paratransit
- Routes: Sturgis Circle Line, Three Rivers Circle Line
- Fleet: 22 buses; 9 vans
- Annual ridership: 68,367 (2024)
- Website: https://www.sjcta.info

The St. Joseph Country Transit Authority is a transit authority in St. Joseph County, Michigan. It operates circle lines in Sturgis and Three Rivers, as well as providing dial-a-ride services for residents of the county.
