= DC Circulator =

Bus system in Washington, D.C

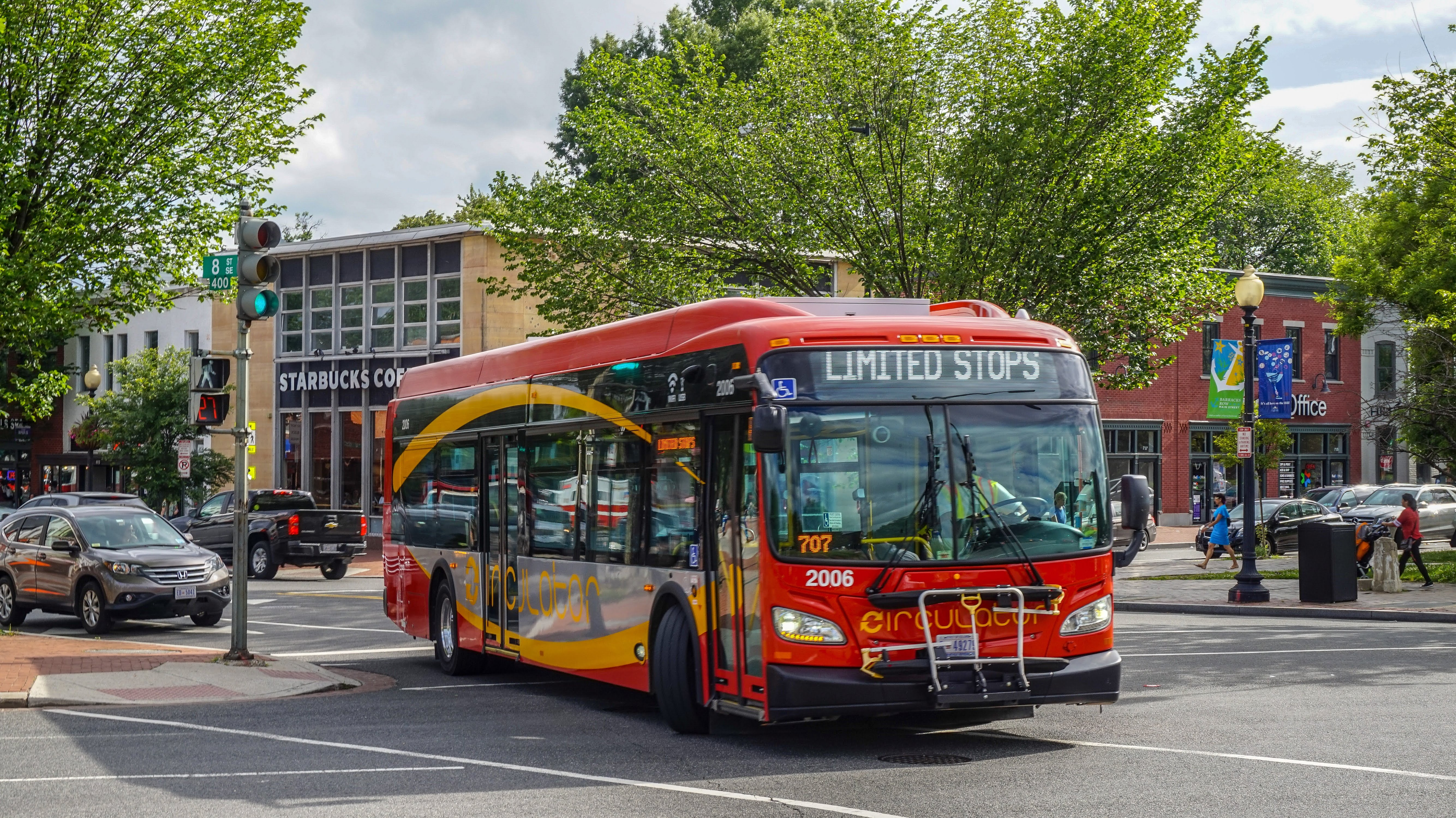
- A DC Circulator bus at Eastern Market in June 2018.
- Founded: July 2005
- Defunct: December 31, 2024
- Service area: Downtown Washington, D.C.
- Service type: Downtown circulator
- Routes: 6 + 1 seasonal
- Stops: 139
- Fleet: 81
- Fuel type: Diesel, Diesel-electric Hybrid, Electric bus
- Operator: RATP Dev
- Partners: DC Dept. of Transportation; WMATA; DC Surface Transit, Inc.
- Website: dccirculator.com

The DC Circulator was a bus system in Washington, D.C. The District of Columbia Department of Transportation operated the service in a public–private partnership with RATP Dev.

The DC Circulator buses were similar to shuttle buses since they operated on a predictable fixed route and schedule and ran between the city's main attractions and some of the more popular neighborhoods for visitors. The service began in 2005, and passengers increased as the routes grew from two to five, with the system reaching peak ridership in 2011. Ridership dropped precipitously from 5.7 million annual riders in 2019 to under 2 million after the COVID-19 pandemic and never recovered.

The fare per ride was $1.00. The subsidy per rider was unusually high; in 2016, it averaged $3.32.

In July 2024, the Washington, D.C. Department of Transportation announced that the system's services would be reduced beginning in October 2024, and phased out entirely by the end of the year. The last day of service for the DC Circulator was on December 31, 2024.

== History ==
The concept of a separate downtown bus was included in a 1997 report by the National Capital Planning Commission (NCPC). The report called for "a simple, inexpensive, and easily navigable surface transit system that complements Metrobus and Metrorail." The next year, representatives of the Commission, the District of Columbia Department of Transportation, the Washington Metropolitan Area Transit Authority, and the Downtown D.C. business improvement district met to plan what would become the Circulator.

After selecting First Transit as the system operator, the DC Circulator started service in July 2005 with two routes: one along K Street from Union Station to Georgetown, and a second from the Walter E. Washington Convention Center to the Southwest Waterfront.

Additional routes were later added to serve the National Mall (2006), the 14th Street Corridor (2009), the Washington Navy Yard (2009), Rosslyn to Dupont Circle (2010), and the Skyland Town Center development in Southeast Washington (2011). The two lines that served the National Mall and the Southwest Waterfront were discontinued in 2011 due to low ridership and redundant service. The National Mall route was reinstated on June 15, 2015. The route was operated in collaboration with the National Park Service.

A report released in March 2011 calls for developing better routes to replace those that had served the National Mall and Southwest Waterfront and adding new service to the U Street Corridor, portions of Upper Northwest, and neighborhoods east of the Anacostia River.

In 2018, RATP Dev replaced First Transit as the operator of the Circulator.

From February 2019 through September 2019, DC Circulator rides were free under Mayor Bowser's Fair Shot initiative. The $1 fare was reinstated in October. Rides were free again after March 2020 due to the COVID-19 pandemic until the $1 fare was reinstated again on October 1, 2021.

=== Phaseout ===
On July 29, 2024, the District Department of Transportation announced that the service would be drawn down throughout the remainder of the year, and eventually discontinued on December 31. Reductions including the discontinuation of most late-night services, elimination of the Rosslyn – Dupont Circle route, and increased headways, are planned to begin on October 1. The announcement cited decreasing ridership and transportation budget cuts as the reasons for ending the service.

On October 1, 2024, the Rosslyn – Dupont Circle route was discontinued entirely, and late night service on the Woodley Park – Adams Morgan and Georgetown – Union Station routes were discontinued. Additionally, all routes were now scheduled to operate every 20 minutes. WMATA responded to the route discontinuation by increasing weekend frequencies on the Ballston – Farragut Square Line (at the time designated as route 38B, now the A58) which operated a similar route to the discontinued Circulator route.

On December 15, 2024, WMATA implemented multiple bus service adjustments, including the introduction of a new route, to prepare for the elimination of the Circulator routes. A new daily bus route called the Anacostia – Stanton Road Line (now route C25) was created to provide service to Stanton Road and Pomeroy Road from Anacostia Station every half hour. This new service was intended to provide coverage to areas serviced by the Congress Heights – Union Station route that were not previously serviced by any existing Metrobus routes. The routing of the Wisconsin Avenue Line (at the time designated as route 33) was adjusted to move the northbound terminal of the route from Federal Triangle to Union Station, providing a similar routing to the Circulator's Georgetown – Union Station route. Service was increased on the 14th Street Line (at the time designated as routes 52 and 54) along 14th Street between Colorado Avenue and Metro Center Station to compensate for the elimination of the Eastern Market – L'Enfant Plaza route.

December 31, 2024 was the last day that the DC Circulator ran service before ending all service.

== Routes ==
The DC Circulator had five lines operating at 20-minute intervals at the time of closure.

=== Georgetown – Union Station ===
This east-west line connected Georgetown with Washington Union Station and operated primarily along Wisconsin Avenue, K Street, and Massachusetts Avenue. Eastbound, the bus started on Wisconsin Avenue at Whitehaven Street in Georgetown. Westbound, the route started in the bus level of the Union Station parking garage. Service was replaced by an extended WMATA Route 33. Since the Better Bus network implementation it is now the D80.

=== Woodley Park – Adams Morgan – McPherson Square Metro ===
This line operated between Woodley Park, Adams Morgan, and McPherson Square via the 14th Street Corridor. Part of this route replaced the discontinued Metrobus 98 route. Service was replaced by additional WMATA Route 54 service.

=== Eastern Market – L’Enfant Plaza ===
This line connected Eastern Market and L'Enfant Plaza through Navy Yard & the DC Wharf District. Service will be replaced in WMATA's Better Bus Network Redesign.

=== Congress Heights – Union Station via Barracks Row ===
This line operated from the Congress Heights and Union Station east of the Anacostia River via Barracks Row on Capitol Hill. This route replaced the discontinued Metrobus 94 line. Service was replaced by WMATA Route C25 service.

=== National Mall Route ===
This 15-stop loop line operated from Union Station to most of the major attractions on or near the Mall, including ones that are at some distance from Metro stations, such as the Lincoln, Jefferson, World War II, FDR, and Martin Luther King. Jr. memorials.

=== Routes discontinued during first stage of phaseout ===
==== Rosslyn – Georgetown – Dupont ====
This line operated from Dupont Circle primarily via M Street through Georgetown and travels over the Key Bridge to Rosslyn. This route replaced the former Georgetown Metro Connection "blue bus." This service was discontinued on October 1, 2024 and replaced by additional WMATA 38B service.

=== Routes discontinued prior to phase out ===
==== Smithsonian – National Gallery of Art ====
Until 2011 this line ran only on summer weekends, serving the National Mall in a loop along Constitution Avenue, 1st Street NE/SE, Independence Avenue, and 17th Street NW/SW. The line was replaced by the more extensive National Mall route in June 2015.

==== Convention Center – SW Waterfront ====
A north-south line connected the Washington Convention Center with the Southwest Waterfront and operated primarily along 7th and 9th streets, which have bus lanes. The service was eliminated on September 25, 2011 due to low ridership. A new Metrobus route, 74, was opened on September 23, 2011 along the 7th Street corridor between the Washington Convention Center and the Waterfront neighborhood, replacing the Circulator line and the eliminated portion of Metrobus Routes 70 and 71 from Pennsylvania Avenue to the South. The 74 bus costs more to ride and offers less frequent service, but the District officials said the ridership on the Circulator was too low to continue it.

==== Potomac Ave Metro – Skyland via Barracks Row ====
This line operated from the Potomac Avenue Metro station and Skyland Town Center east of the Anacostia River via Barracks Row on Capitol Hill. It was replaced by the Congress Heights – Union Station route on June 24, 2018 replacing Metrobus Route 94.

==== Union Station – Navy Yard Metro ====
This line connected Union Station and Navy Yard through Capitol Hill, with extended service on Washington Nationals game days. This route was replaced by the Eastern Market – L’Enfant Plaza route on June 24, 2018. Also this route replaced the discontinued Metrobus N22 line.

==== Zoo Express Route ====
This seasonal line operated from Woodley Park station to Smithsonian National Zoo during the 2019 summer season. The service first ran between May 4, 2019 and September 30, 2019. DC Circulator planned on operating the line again during later summer seasons.

== Fleet ==
Photo	Builder and model	Model year	Length	Numbers (Total)	Engine	Transmission	Notes
	Van Hool; A300K	2009	30 ft (9.144 m)	1130-1143 (14 buses)	Cummins ISB	Voith D854.5	Entered in service in April 2009; All units have been repainted to the Comet livery as of July 2024
	New Flyer; Xcelsior XDE40	2014–15	40 ft (12.19 m)	2001-2018 (18 buses)	Cummins ISB6.7	BAE Systems HybriDrive HDS200	First buses to originally feature the Comet livery; Entered service on June 14, 2015
	New Flyer; Xcelsior XD40	2016	40 ft (12.19 m)	2101-2126 (26 buses)	Cummins ISL9	Allison B400R	Entered service in late July 2017
	Proterra; Catalyst BE40 E2	2017	40 ft (12.19 m)	3001-3014 (14 buses)			First DC Circulator all-electric buses; Entered service on May 1, 2018
	Proterra; ZX5	2022	40 ft (12.19 m)	3101 (1 bus)			Originally ordered as 3101-3114.; 3101 delivered in August 2022.; Rest weren't built due to Proterra filed for Chapter 11 Bankruptcy protection.; Entered service in 2023.

=== Retired Fleet ===
Year	Builder and model	Number of vehicles	Year Retired	Picture	Notes
2003–04	Van Hool; A330	29	2018		Part of an order by AC Transit of Oakland, CA. These buses are built to their specifications, but had air conditioning added.; 1108 was in the Comet livery.; All units retired as of September 2017.
2010	Van Hool; A300L	6	2018		Entered in service in September 2010.; All units retired as of December 31, 2018.; Most units transferred to various First Transit-operated university bus systems.

== See also ==
- Public-private partnerships in the United States
