= Sibley Hospital–Stadium Armory Line =

Bus route in Washington, D.C., United States

D6
- Sibley Hospital–Stadium Armory Line

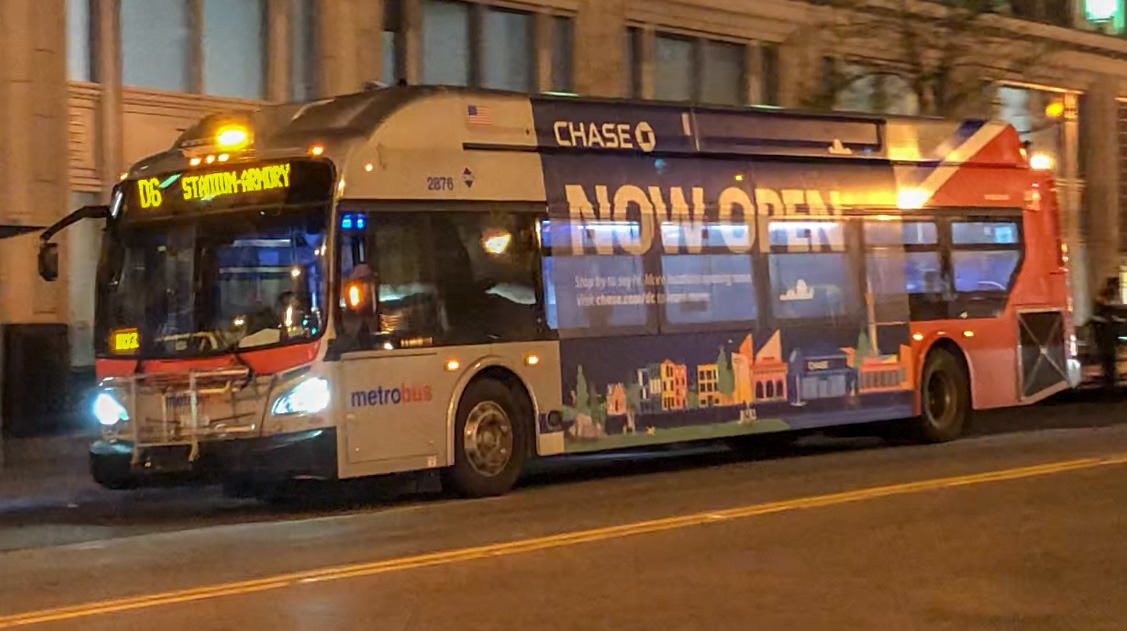
- Route D6

Overview
- System: Metrobus
- Operator: Washington Metropolitan Area Transit Authority
- Garage: Andrews Federal Center (weekdays); Bladensburg (Daily); Western (select trips)
- Livery: Local
- Status: Split into two routes and renamed into routes D24 and D94.
- Began service: 1980s
- Ended service: June 29, 2025

Route
- Locale: Southeast, Northeast, Northwest
- Communities served: Palisades, Foxhall, Burleith, Georgetown, Downtown, Kingman Park
- Landmarks served: Sibley Hospital, Palisades, Foxhall Village, MedStar Georgetown University Hospital, Georgetown, Dupont Circle station, Farragut North station, Farragut West station, Farragut Square, Metro Center station, Judiciary Square station, Union Station, Washington Union Station, Capitol Hill, Stadium–Armory station
- Start: Sibley Hospital
- Via: MacArthur Boulevard NW, Q Street NW, K Street NW (to Stadium-Armory), I Street NW (to Sibley Hospital), E Street NW, C Street NE (to Sibley Hospital), D Street NE (to Stadium-Armory)
- End: Stadium–Armory station
- Length: 60-90 minutes
- Other routes: D5

Service
- Level: Daily
- Frequency: 15 minutes (weekday peak hours); 30 minutes (off-peak hours); 30-40 minutes (late nights)
- Journey time: 4:10 AM – 12:00 AM
- Ridership: 1,078,813 (FY 2025)
- Transfers: SmarTrip only
- Timetable: Sibley Hospital–Stadium Armory Line

The Sibley Hospital–Stadium Armory Line, designated Route D6, was a daily bus route operated by the Washington Metropolitan Area Transit Authority between Stadium–Armory station of the Blue, Orange, and Silver Lines of the Washington Metro and Sibley Hospital in the Palisades neighborhood. The line operated every 15 minutes during the weekday peak hours, 20 minutes during the off-peak hours, and 30–40 minutes during the late nights. Route D6 trips were roughly 60–90 minutes long.

== Background ==
Route D6 operated daily between Stadium–Armory station and Sibley Hospital connecting Palisades, Foxhall, Burleith, Georgetown, and Kingman Park residents to Downtown without having to take the train. Route D6 operated out of Andrews Federal Center and Bladensburg with select trips operated out of Western.

== History ==
The Sibley Hospital Line was originally operated under the Washington Railway & Electric Company prior to it merging with the Capital Traction Company in 1933. Route D6 originally began operating between Glover Park and Downtown under the Capital Street Company. The line at first were operated by streetcars, but then formed into buses on April 12, 1926. The line was later operated until DC Transit in 1956 and then acquired by WMATA on February 4, 1973.

Service along Loughboro Road was replaced by route M4 and F Street/D Street was replaced by route 42 through the years.

On March 27, 1976, route D6 was extended from Downtown DC to Rhode Island Avenue–Brentwood station via Washington Union Station in order to provide newly opened Metrorail service.

On June 15, 1977, route D6 was extended from Rhode Island Avenue to Washington Hospital Center. A new route D8 was also introduced to operate between Washington Hospital Center and Sibley Hospital via the Hospital Complex, Trinity University, Glenwood Cemetery, the Edgewood Terrace Apartments, the Rhode Island Avenue Shopping Center, the Rhode Island Avenue–Brentwood station, Washington Union Station, Judiciary Square, Metro Center, and Dupont Circle stations.

In 1995, the line was split into two routes in order to simplify the line.

Route D6 was split to operate between Sibley Hospital and Stadium–Armory station, via Washington Union Station, instead of operating to Washington Hospital Center and up to Glover Park in order to replace the segment of the former routes 40, 42, and 44 between Union Station and Stadium–Armory station when both 40 and 44 were discontinued and 42 was shortened to operate between Mount Pleasant and Metro Center station. Route D6 also replaced the portion of route D2 between Dupont Circle station and Stadium–Armory station and route D4 portion between Washington Union Station and Stadium–Armory station.

New routes D1 and D3 were introduced to operate alongside the D6. D1 would operate between Glover Park and Washington Union Station while route D3 operated between Sibley Hospital and Union Station.

Route D8 was also split to only operate between Washington Hospital Center and Washington Union Station. The segment of D8's routing west of Union Station was replaced by routes D1, D3, and D6. At the same time, the D8 replaced the segment of D6's former routing between Union Station and Washington Hospital Center, via Rhode Island Avenue–Brentwood station.

As a result, as route D6 became a part of the Sibley Hospital–Stadium Armory Line, which operated alongside routes D1 and D3 while route D8 became a part of the Hospital Center Line.

On December 27, 2009, short trips were added to route D6 during the weekday peak hours. This means that there will continue to be buses operating the full route every 22 to 25 minutes with two shorter routes added during peak hours. One will go from Farragut Square to Stadium–Armory station and the other will go from Farragut Square to Sibley Hospital.

On June 17, 2012, route D6 short trips to Dupont Circle were scheduled to end at 20th Street & New Hampshire Avenue, NW instead of at P & 22nd streets, NW. Short trips starting at Farragut Square would leave from 17th & I streets, NW on the east side of the park rather than from the west side of the park.

During the COVID-19 pandemic, the route was reduced to operate on its Saturday supplemental schedule during the weekdays beginning on March 16, 2020. On March 18, 2020, the line was further reduced to operate on its Sunday schedule. Weekend service was later suspended on March 21, 2020. Additional service and all weekend service was restored on August 23, 2020.

In February 2021 during WMATA's FY2022 budget crisis, WMATA proposed eliminating the D6 in the second half of the fiscal year if they did not get any federal funding. A portion would be replaced by a modified Route 80, B2, and N6. There would be no alternative service between Dupont Circle and Farragut Square, MacArthur Boulevard, or to Stadium Armory station. Subsequently on April 22, 2021, WMATA approved the FY2022 budget and received federal funding to avoid service cuts.

On December 11, 2022, Westbound D6 trips to Sibley Hospital was rerouted to I Street between 13th & 20th Streets NW due to safety response to K Street road diversions.

In 2024 during WMATA's FY2024 Budget crisis, WMATA proposed to eliminate all D6 service. However on April 25, 2024, Metro’s Board of Directors approved a $4.8 billion capital and operating budget which avoided service cuts.

=== Better Bus Redesign ===
In 2022, WMATA launched its Better Bus Redesign project, which aimed to redesign the entire Metrobus Network and is the first full redesign of the agency's bus network in its history.

In April 2023, WMATA launched its Draft Visionary Network. As part of the drafts, WMATA proposed to split the D6 into two routes. The eastern half of the D6 was named Route DC216 and was partially combined with the D4 to operate between Stadium–Armory station and The Kennedy Center via D Street NE, C Street NE, 8th Street NE, and K Street NW. The western half of the D6 was named Route DC100 and was proposed to operate between Sibley Hospital and Washington Union Station via the current D6 routing between Sibley Hospital and Q Street NW, then would operate along P Street NW and New Jersey Avenue NW to Union station. Service along E Street NW would be operated by the proposed Route DC110 between Fort Totten station and McPherson Square station.

During WMATA's Revised Draft Visionary Network, WMATA renamed the DC100 to Routes D92 and D94 and the DC216 to Route D24 and changed the routing on the three routes.

Route D24 would operate between Deanwood station and McPherson Square station via 11th Street NW, E Street NW, Union station, Massachusetts Avenue NW, D Street NE, C Street NE, 17th Street NE, 19th Street NE, Stadium–Armory station, Whitney Young Memorial Bridge, East Capitol Street SE, Division Avenue NE, Eastern Avenue, and Minnesota Avenue NE. Route D92 would operate between Georgetown University and Union station via 37th Street NW, Prospect Street NW, 38th Street NW, Q Street NW, P Street NW, and New Jersey Avenue NW, following a similar routing to the current G2. Route D94 would operate between Sibley Hospital and Gallery Place station via the current D6 routing between Sibley Hospital and Dupont Circle station, then would operate along 21st Street NW, 20th Street NW, I Street NW, H Street NW, 11th Street NW, and 9th Street NW, terminating at Gallery Place.

All changes were then proposed during WMATA's 2025 Proposed Network.

During the proposals, Route D92 was cut and replaced by Route C91, which follows the same routing as the current Route G2. Routes D24 and D94 remained the same from the proposals.

On November 21, 2024, WMATA approved its Better Bus Redesign Network, with service on the Sibley Hospital-Stadium Armory Line being simplified.

Beginning on June 29, 2025, the line was split into two routes. The D6 portion between Stadium–Armory station and McPherson Square station was renamed into the D24, with service also being extended to Deanwood station via East Capitol Street NE, Division Avenue NE, and Eastern Avenue NE. The D6 portion between Sibley Hospital and McPherson Square station was renamed into the D94 and was extended to Gallery Place station with service operating along H Street instead of K Street.
