= Bart Whiteman =

American actor

- Born: 1948
- Died: March 14, 2006 (aged 57–58)

Bart Whiteman (1948-March 14, 2006) was a Washington, D.C. theatre actor, director, and producer. He founded the Source Theatre in 1977 and served as its artistic director until 1986. He was influential in defining theatre in Washington as well as reviving 14th Street. According to Christopher Henley, artistic director of the Washington Shakespeare Company, "Bart was one of the half-dozen or so of the most seminal influences on and pioneers of what theatre in D.C. was and has become. He was part of that synergy -- along with Joy [Zinoman, founding artistic director of the Studio Theatre] and Tony Abeson [founder and director of the Washington Theatre Laboratory] -- that really began the small professional theatre movement in D.C. in the late 1970s." Trey Graham of the Washington City Paper said that the richness and diversity of modern-day Washington theatre "had a lot to do with his role as evangelist and cattle prod and crazy-ass visionary." Whiteman left the Source Theater after an incident in which it produced Fool for Love and A Streetcar Named Desire without paying royalties. Later, he became a theater teacher at Montgomery Bell Academy in Nashville, Tennessee and wrote editorials and theater reviews for The Chattanoogan in Chattanooga, Tennessee.
