= 14th Street (Washington, D.C.) =

Street in northwest and southwest quadrants of Washington, D.C., US

14th Street Southwest and Northwest
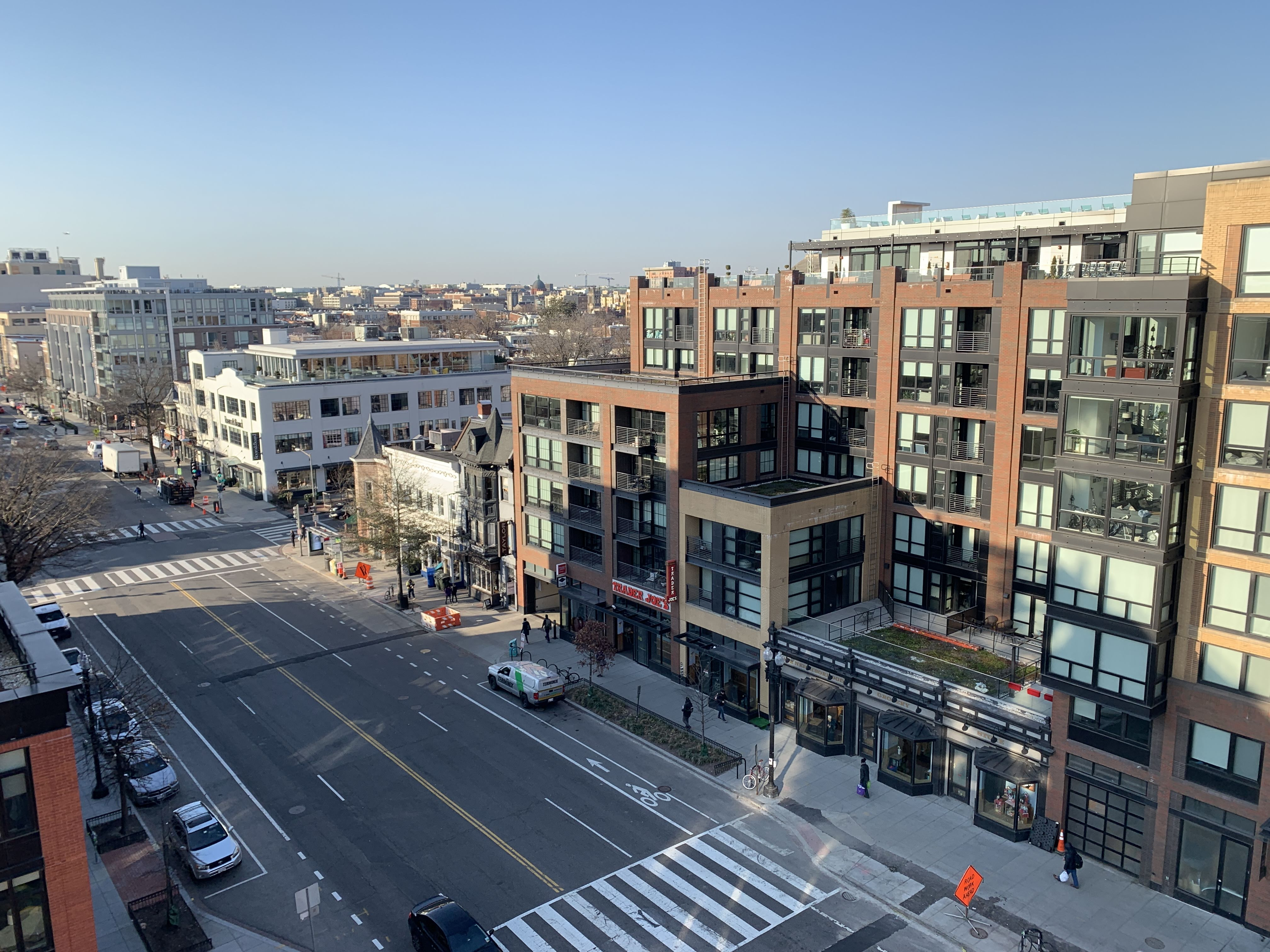
- Retail and apartment buildings at 14th and U Streets in 2019
- Interactive map of 14th Street Southwest and Northwest
- Maintained by: DDOT
- Length: 7.2 mi (11.6 km)
- Location: Southwest and Northwest, Washington, D.C.
- Coordinates: 38°53′22″N 77°1′55″W
- South end: I-395 / US 1 in East Potomac Park
- Major junctions: US 50 (Constitution Avenue) in Federal Triangle; US 29 (K Street) in Downtown
- North end: Eastern Avenue in Shepherd Park
- East: 13th Street
- West: 15th Street

Construction
- Commissioned: 1791
- Fourteenth Street Historic District
- U.S. National Register of Historic Places
- U.S. Historic district
- Location within the District of Columbia Location within the United States
- Location: Roughly bounded by S, 12th, N and 15th Sts., NW., Washington, District of Columbia
- Area: 105 acres (42 ha)
- Architects: Brown, Glenn, et al.
- Architectural style: Mid 19th Century Revival, Late Victorian, Modern Movement
- NRHP reference No.: 94000992
- Added to NRHP: November 9, 1994

14th Street NW/SW is a street in Northwest and Southwest quadrants of Washington, D.C., located 1.25 miles (2.01 km) west of the U.S. Capitol. It runs from the 14th Street Bridge north to Eastern Avenue.

Northbound U.S. Route 1 runs along 14th Street from the bridge to Constitution Avenue, where it turns east with US 50. US 1 southbound previously used 15th Street NW due to the ban on left turns from westbound Constitution Avenue to 14th Street, but it now uses the Ninth Street Tunnel, five blocks to the east. 14th Street crosses the National Mall and runs near the White House and through the western side of Washington's Logan Circle neighborhood.

Because it connects to one of the main bridges crossing the Potomac River into Northern Virginia, 14th Street has always been a major transportation corridor. It was the location of one of the first streetcar lines, and today it is the location of several afternoon carpooling "slug lines", which allow commuters to meet the high-occupancy vehicle requirements of I-395, the Henry G. Shirley Memorial Highway.

== History ==
In the middle of the 20th century, 14th Street NW near the intersection of P Street was home to many car dealerships and was known as "auto row". The Casino Royal at 14th and H Streets was one of the city's most popular nightclubs. The street was the location of race riots in 1968 after the assassination of Martin Luther King Jr.

In the 1970s and 1980s, a portion of 14th Street became known primarily for its red-light district. Several strip clubs and massage parlors were concentrated roughly between New York Avenue and K Street, while prostitutes plied their trade around Logan Circle. However, rising land values eventually pushed out the adult businesses. The Source Theatre, founded by Bart Whiteman in 1977, was given some credit for the area's revival. Whiteman stood outside the theater to escort people inside in order to make them feel safer.

With the gentrification of the neighborhoods through which it passes – particularly downtown, Logan Circle, the U Street Corridor, and Columbia Heights – 14th Street is now known for live theater, art galleries, and trendy restaurants. Moreover, while the nominal center of the city's gay life is still Dupont Circle, the Washington Blade called 14th Street between U Street and Massachusetts Avenue (Thomas Circle) the best place to see and be seen. As of 2012, the center of gravity had shifted and Logan Circle was voted "DC's gay neighborhood."

The opening of a Whole Foods Market at 14th and P Streets in 2000 was considered a turning point for the neighborhood. The 21st century brought rapid gentrification along 14th Street, especially south of Florida Avenue. Within a decade, it had become one of the preeminent dining destinations in the Greater Washington area. In nine months of 2012 and 2013, two dozen restaurants opened on 14th Street. From 2010 to 2012, almost every block of 14th between Rhode Island and Florida Avenues had a major residential redevelopment project scheduled, adding more than 1,200 housing units and 85,000 square feet (7,900 m^{2}) of retail.

== Landmarks ==
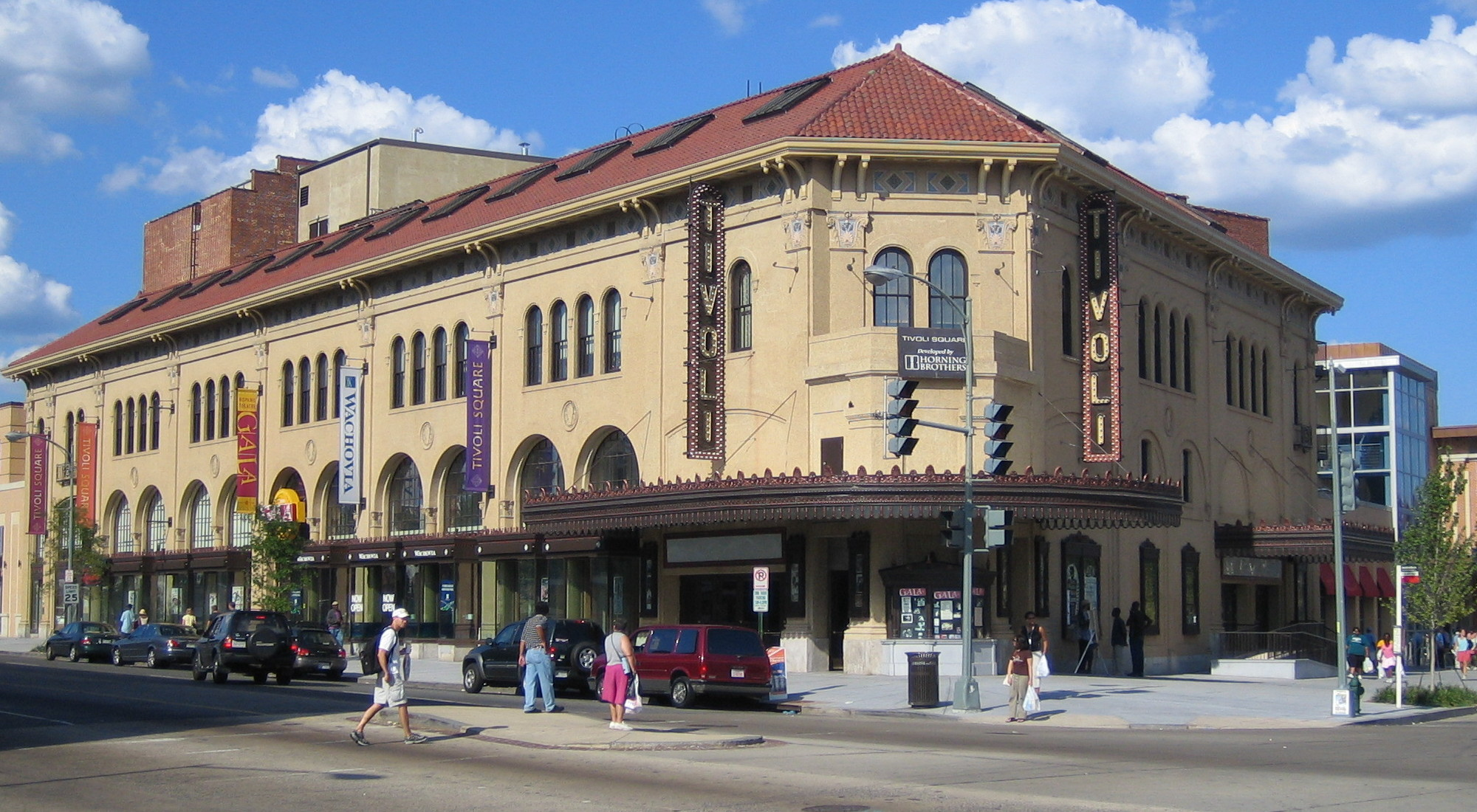
The renovated Tivoli Theatre in Columbia Heights at Park Road and 14th Street NW.

- The Black Cat
- Columbia Heights Metro station
- DC USA
- Freedom Plaza
- Garfinckel's
- John A. Wilson Building
- National Aquarium
- National City Christian Church
- National Museum of American History
- National Press Building
- Oscar Straus Memorial
- Pershing Park
- Ronald Reagan Building
- Thomas Circle
- Tivoli Theatre
- United States Department of Commerce
- United States Holocaust Memorial Museum
- Walter Reed Army Medical Center
- Willard InterContinental Washington

== Transit service ==
14th Street has been a major transit route ever since the Capital Traction Company streetcar line was built around the turn of the 20th century. The successor to that line is the Metrobus 14th Street Line—routes 52 & 54.

=== Rail ===
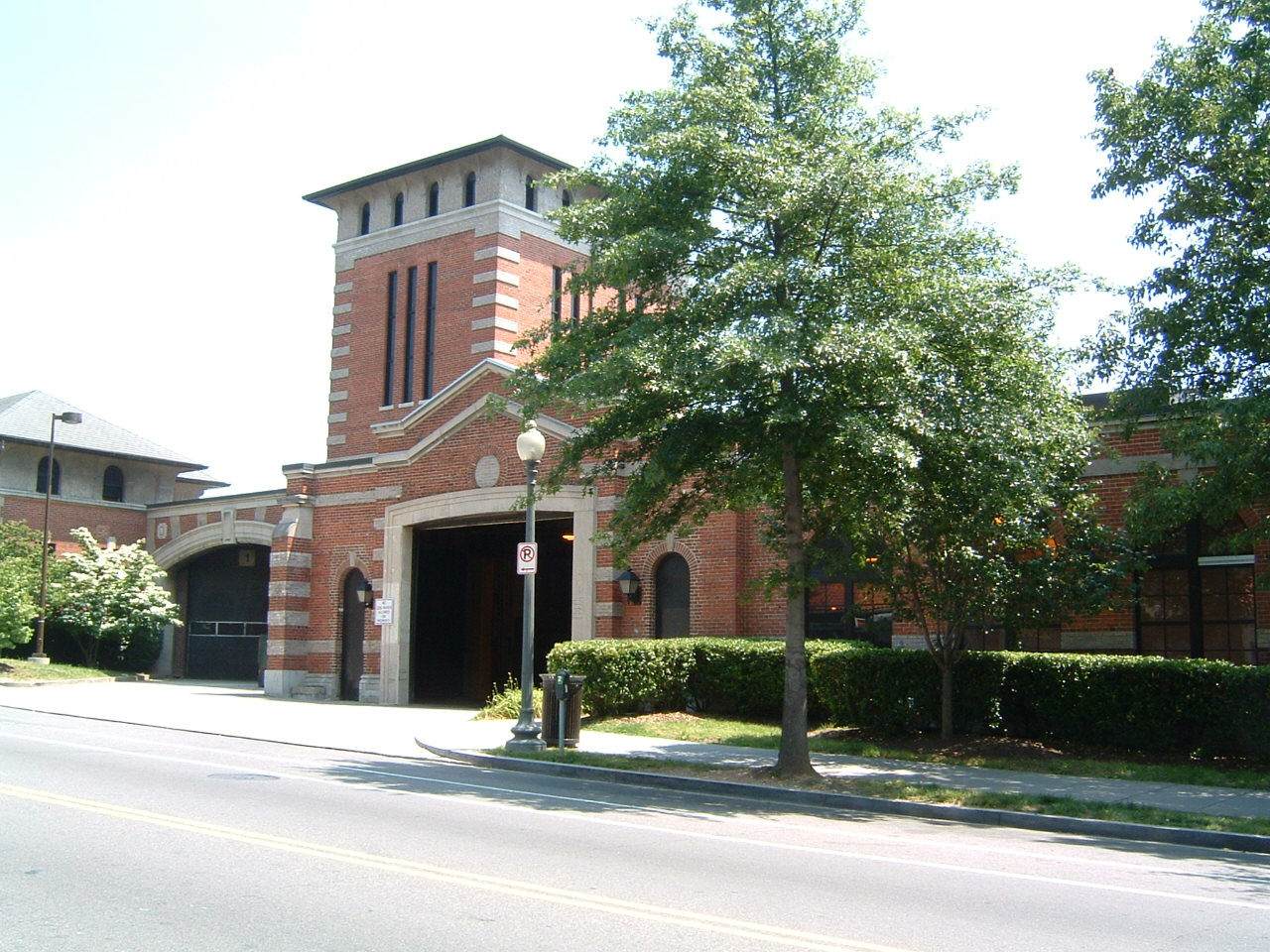
The Decatur Street Car Barn at 4615 14th St. NW, built in 1906 by the Capital Traction Company. It is now the Metrobus Northern Division garage.

There are two Metrorail stations on 14th Street (the U Street station is one block east, at 13th and U Streets NW and is considered the most convenient stop to visit the heart of 14th St between P and V Sts NW):

- McPherson Square
  Blue Line
  Orange Line
  Silver Line
- Columbia Heights
  Green Line

=== Bus ===
==== Metrobus ====
The following Metrobus routes travel along the street (listed from south to north):

- D32 (Fort Lincoln to the Federal Triangle)
- D50 (Takoma or 14th St & Colorado Ave. to L'Enfant Plaza)
- D5X (Takoma to Metro Center)
- D44 (Fort Totten to Federal Triangle)

==== DC Circulator ====
The DC Circulator's Woodley Park–Adams Morgan–McPherson Square Metro bus line traveled along 14th Street between Columbia Heights and Franklin Square.
