= District Department of Transportation =

Washington, D.C. local agency

Coordinates: 38°55′1.9″N 77°1′56.4″W

Agency overview
- Formed: May 2002
- Preceding agency: Division of Transportation, District of Columbia Department of Public Works
- Jurisdiction: District of Columbia
- Headquarters: 250 M Street SE, Washington, D.C. 20003
- Motto: d. delivers
- Employees: 1246 (fiscal 2023)
- Annual budget: $127.838 million (fiscal 2009)
- Agency executive: Sharon Kershbaum, Interim Director
- Website: ddot.dc.gov

The District Department of Transportation (DDOT, stylized as d.) is an agency of the government of the District of Columbia, in the United States, which manages and maintains publicly owned transportation infrastructure in the District of Columbia. DDOT is the lead agency with authority over the planning, design, construction, and maintenance of alleys, bridges, sidewalks, streets, street lights, and traffic signals in the District of Columbia.

== History ==
Historical documents refer to the entity now known as DDOT as the "D.C. Department of Highways" in the 1940s and 50s, and later the "D.C. Department of Highways and Traffic" through the 1960s and early 70s.

In August 1975, the department merged with the Department of Motor Vehicles and the Office of the Mayor's Transportation Systems Coordinator to become the D.C. Division of Transportation, a subunit of the D.C. Department of Public Works (DPW). The division began suffering from significant deficiencies in the 1990s, including an over-reliance on outside contractors, a lack of expertise with which to oversee contractors and ensure performance and quality work, severe understaffing, and excessive lead times for the letting and implementing of design and construction contracts. These issues led to significant backlogs in maintenance and construction, and hundreds of millions of dollars in federal funds were unexpended.

In response to the impending management crisis in its transportation division, in May 2002, the Council of the District of Columbia passed the District Department of Transportation Establishment Act of 2002 (D.C. Law 14-137), which separated the Division of Transportation from the Department of Public Works and created a standalone D.C. Department of Transportation (DDOT). A 2004 assessment indicated that the reorganization led to significant improvements in the District of Columbia's oversight of its transportation infrastructure.

== Operations ==
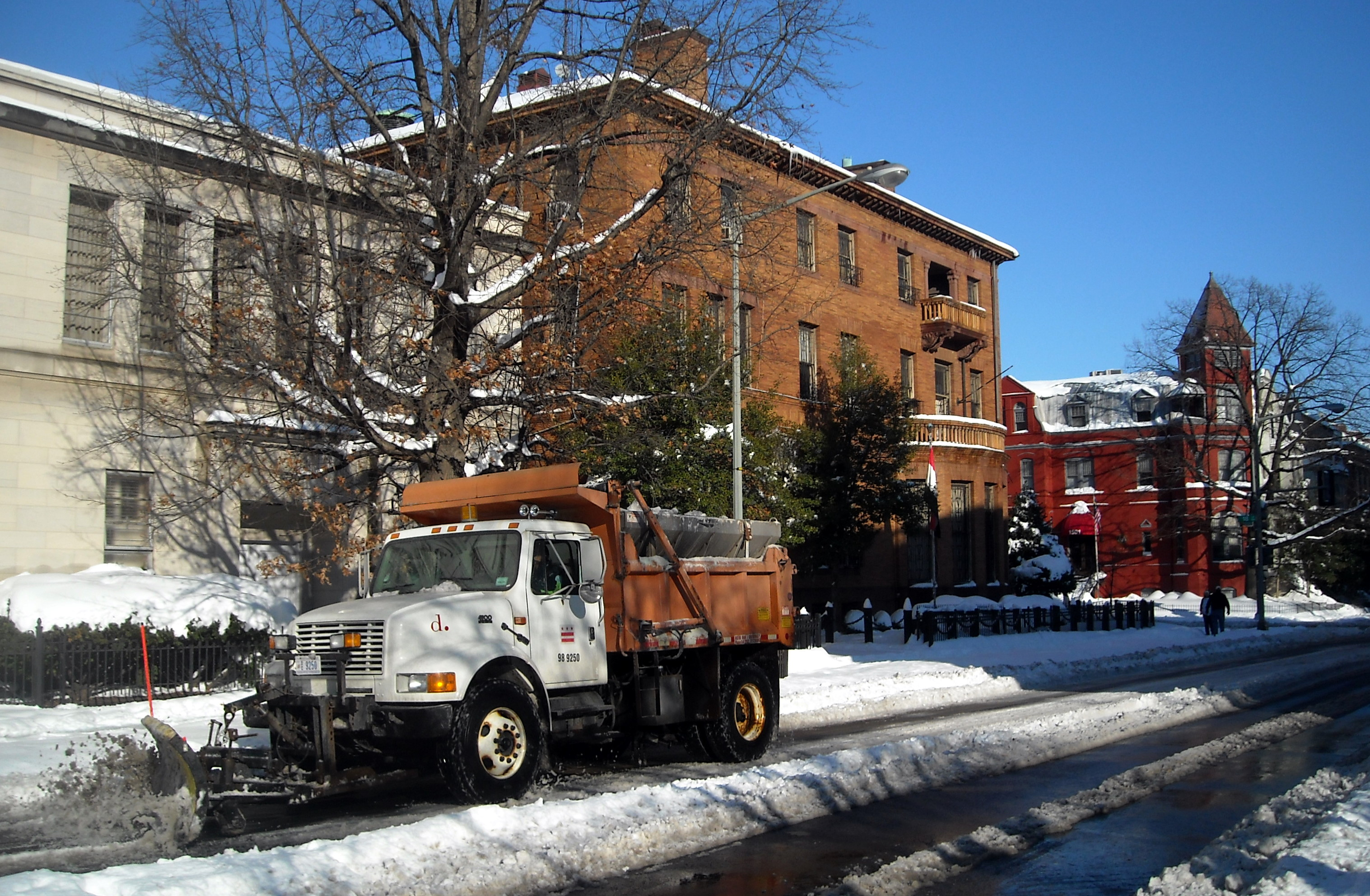
A DDOT snowplow in Dupont Circle, following the 2009 North American blizzard.

DDOT is led by a Director who is assisted by a Chief of Staff, Deputy Director for Operations, and Deputy Director for Resource Allocation.

The most recent director was Everett Lott, who recently left DDOT. Five operational departments oversee DDOT's main functions: the Infrastructure Project Management Administration (IPMA), the Mass Transit Administration (MTA), the Transportation Policy & Planning Administration (TPPA), the Transportation Operations Administration (TOA), and the Urban Forestry Administration (UFA). Four administrative offices (Communication, Information Technology, Contracting and Procurement, and Legal) provide managerial support.

DDOT coordinates a number of programs with other city and regional agencies. DDOT shares street and sidewalk snow removal with the Department of Public Works, and coordinates a reduced-fare program for elementary and secondary school students with MetroBus and MetroRail. Because of the heavy regional integration of the District's transportation system with other local, county, state, and federal governments, DDOT's Transportation Policy and Planning Administration coordinates policy with the Washington Metropolitan Area Transit Authority (WMATA) and the Metropolitan Washington Council of Governments' regional transportation planning and policy bodies. DDOT also works closely with the District of Columbia Emergency Management Agency, Metropolitan Washington Council of Governments, the State of Maryland, the Commonwealth of Virginia, and the U.S. federal government to plan and implement the Regional Emergency Coordination Plan (which provides for emergency evacuation of the District of Columbia and surrounding areas in case of a major event, natural disaster, or military or terrorist attack).

DDOT's headquarters was located at 55 M Street SE on top of the Navy Yard Metro station until April 2021. Currently DDOT's headquarters is located at 250 M Street SE.

== Funding and current projects ==
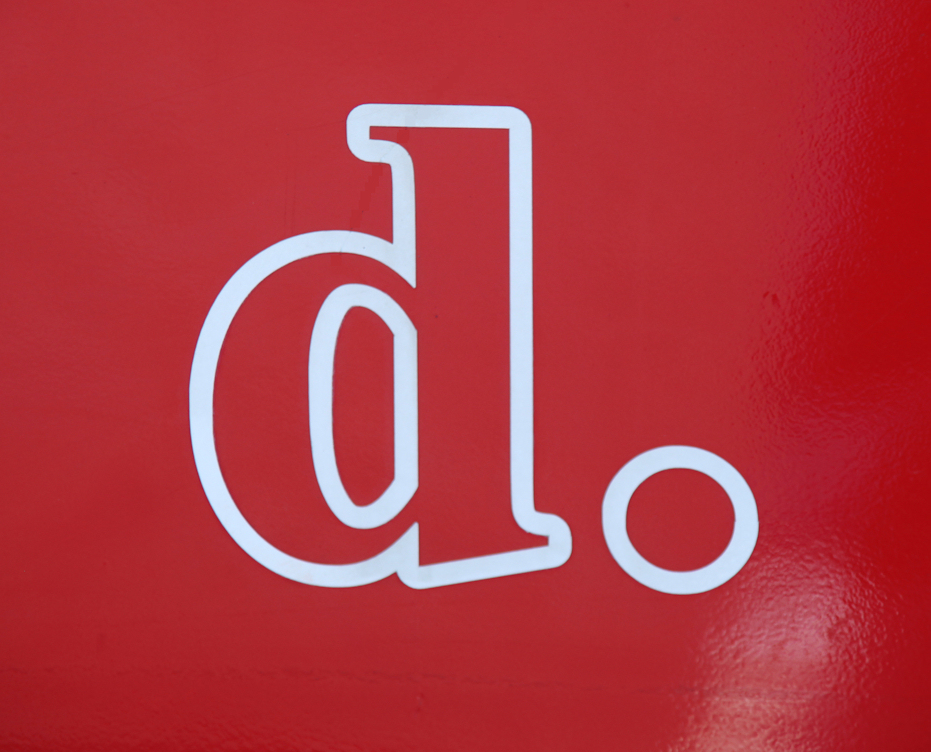
DDOT logo on a DC Circulator bus.

As of 2004, all of the District's bridges and approximately 30 percent of its roads were eligible for funding from the Federal Highway Administration (FHWA). The remaining roads were maintained solely with D.C. government funds.

DDOT is engaged in a number of critical transportation initiatives, many of which focus on economic development in the city's poorer neighborhoods. Among DDOT's major initiatives are:

- DC Streetcar - (defunct) DDOT owned and was the sole financier of DC Streetcar, a surface light rail and streetcar network constructed in Washington, D.C.
- Great Streets Initiative - DDOT is a lead agency in the District of Columbia's Great Streets Initiative, which seeks to revitalize critical transportation and retail corridors throughout the city to spur economic development. Current Great Streets projects include Brentwood Road NE, H Street NE, Kenilworth Avenue NE, New York Avenue, Pennsylvania Avenue SE, and South Capitol Street.
- DC Circulator (defunct) - DDOT owned the DC Circulator bus system, a downtown circulator bus system. The Washington Metro managed the Circulator's operations, while a contractor (First Transit) operated the system. DDOT and Metro funded the Circulator in cooperation with D.C. Surface Transit Inc. (a nonprofit conglomerate that includes the Downtown Business Improvement District, Georgetown Business Improvement District, Golden Triangle Business Improvement District, Capitol Hill Business Improvement District, Washington Convention Center Authority, and the Washington, D.C. Convention and Tourism Corporation).
- 11th Street Bridges - DDOT is replacing both spans of the 11th Street Bridges with three new bridges at a cost of $365 million. The project is the biggest construction effort ever undertaken by DDOT.

== Statistics ==
The District Department of Transportation is responsible for:

- 1,100 miles (1,800 km) of streets
- 241 bridges
- 1,600 miles (2,600 km) of sidewalks
- 453 miles (729 km) of alleys
- 144,000 trees adjacent to city streets

== Directors ==
Name	Tenure
Sharon Kershbaum	9/29/2023 - present
Everett Lott	2/5/2021-9/29/23
Jeffrey Marootian	8/11/2017-2/4/2021
Leif A. Dormsjo	1/2/2015-8/10/2016
Matthew T. Brown	5/2/2014-1/1/2015
Terry Bellamy	1/2/2011-5/1/2014
Gabe Klein	2/1/2009-1/1/2011
Frank Seales, Jr (interim)	8/1/2008-1/31/2009
Emeka Moneme	1/2/2007-7/31/2008
Michelle L. Pourciau	2/11/2006-1/1/2007
Daniel M. Tangherlini	5/20/2002-2/10/2006

== See also ==
- Washington Metropolitan Area Transit Authority
