= Glover Park–Franklin Square Line =

D1
- Glover Park–Franklin Square Line

Overview
- System: Metrobus
- Operator: Washington Metropolitan Area Transit Authority
- Garage: Western; Southern Avenue (Select Peak Hour Trips)
- Livery: Local
- Status: Eliminated
- Began service: 1999
- Ended service: September 5, 2021

Route
- Locale: Northwest
- Communities served: Glover Park, Burleith, Georgetown, Downtown
- Landmarks served: Glover Park, Burleith, Georgetown, Dupont Circle station, Farragut North station, Farragut West station, Farragut Square, Franklin Square, McPherson Square station
- Start: Glover Park (41st St & Davis Pl NW)
- Via: Q Street NW, K Street NW, E Street NW, 13th Street NW
- End: McPherson Square station (Franklin Square Entrance)
- Length: 40 minutes
- Other routes: D2

Service
- Level: Daily
- Frequency: 8-20 minutes (AM peak); 30 minutes (PM peak)
- Operates: 7:10 AM - 8:54 AM; 4:40 PM - 6:40 PM
- Transfers: SmarTrip only
- Timetable: Glover Park–Franklin Square Line

The Glover Park–Franklin Square Line, designated Route D1, was a weekday peak hour bus route operated by the Washington Metropolitan Area Transit Authority between Glover Park and Franklin Square. The line operated in the weekday peak direction only every 8–20 minutes during the AM weekday peak hours and 30 minutes during the PM peak hours. Route D1 trips were roughly 40 minutes long.

== Background ==
Route D1 operated during weekday peak hours only in the peak direction between Glover Park and Franklin Square. The route was basically an extended route D2 as the D2 ends at Dupont Circle station. The line connected Glover Park, Burleith, and Georgetown residents to Downtown as there is no Metrorail station near Georgetown.

Route D1 operated out of Western division with a few trips out of Southern Avenue.

== History ==
Route D1 was created as a new route in 1999 under the Sibley Hospital–Stadium Armory Line operating alongside the D3, and D6 as a weekday peak-hour supplement service to route D2. The new route D1 operated between Glover Park and Washington Union Station via Federal Triangle and Franklin Square mostly operating along Q Street NW, K Street NW, E Street NW, and 13th Street NW. The line would connect the growing Georgetown and residents in Glover Park and Burleith to Downtown as there were no Metrorail station that was built in Georgetown.

On December 27, 2009, route D1 was shortened to Federal Triangle with service to Washington Union Station being replaced by routes D3 during the weekday peak-hours. It was also split from the Sibley Hospital–Stadium Armory Line and operated on its own as the Glover Park–Franklin Square Line. According to WMATA, it says:

The route will be changed to operate between Glover Park and Federal Triangle. Eastbound buses will follow the regular route from Glover Park to 13th and E Streets, NW, then continue via 13th Street onto Pennsylvania Avenue to the terminal stand on the west side of 10th Street, NW. The westbound route will begin at this terminal stand and continue via Constitution Avenue, 12th Street, Pennsylvania Avenue, 13th Street and resume the regular route.

Two new buses will be scheduled to leave eastbound from Glover Park at 9:05 a.m. and westbound from Federal Triangle at 7:05 p.m. The bus schedule will change.

In 2015, WMATA proposed to eliminate the D1 segment between Franklin Square and Federal Triangle as the portion suffers from low ridership. Alternative service is provided by routes 42, 80, D6, S2, S4, and X2.

On June 26, 2016, route D1 was shortened even further from Federal Triangle to Franklin Square due to low ridership.

In 2019, WMATA proposed to eliminate the D1 and replace it with a proposed G2 reroute due to alternative service available. The proposal was met with controversy with residents due to service being lacking in Georgetown if the proposal goes through. WMATA later backed out of the proposal due to major customer opposition.

In response to the COVID-19 pandemic, WMATA suspended all D1 service on March 16, 2020.

The proposed elimination was brought back up on September 26, 2020 due to low federal funding. Route D1 has not operated since March 13, 2020 due to Metro's response to the COVID-19 pandemic. The proposal went through and by September 5, 2021, Route D1 was no more.
