= Downtown circulator =

A GoRaleigh downtown circulator bus

In the United States, a downtown circulator is a local transportation service, typically a bus, streetcar, or designated road loop, designed to move people within a confined urban area, connecting key destinations within a downtown city center and linking them to major transit corridors.

The form of transportation has roots back to 1828 in Paris with the Ommes Omnibus, where large horse-drawn carriages would carry people throughout the French capital.

== Examples ==
- Miami, Florida's Downtown Distributor
- Pawtucket, Rhode Island's Downtown Circulator
- The former DC Circulator bus system in Washington, D.C.
- Tulsa, Oklahoma's Inner Dispersal Loop formed by I-444 (Unsigned) and I-244.
- Kansas City, Missouri's downtown freeway loop
- Molly the Trolley of Trinity Metro in downtown Fort Worth. One everyday line and one lunch weekday line.
- Lymmo of LYNX (Central Florida Regional Transportation Authority) in Orlando. Four lines.
- Music City Circuit of WeGo Public Transit of Nashville. Two free lines.
- Atlanta, Georgia's streetcar
- Cincinnati, Ohio's Connector streetcar
- El Paso, Texas's streetcar
- Oklahoma City, Oklahoma's streetcar

== Circulator bus ==
A circulator bus is a bus serving an area confined to a specific locale, such as a downtown/city center area (downtown circulator), university campus, or suburban neighborhood, with connections to major traffic corridors. The concept was first brought to and popularized in the United States in 1982 with the creation of the MallRide, now called FreeRide, in Denver.

== See also ==
- Ring road
