= K Street-Ivy City Line =

Bus route in Washington

D36
- K Street-Ivy City Line

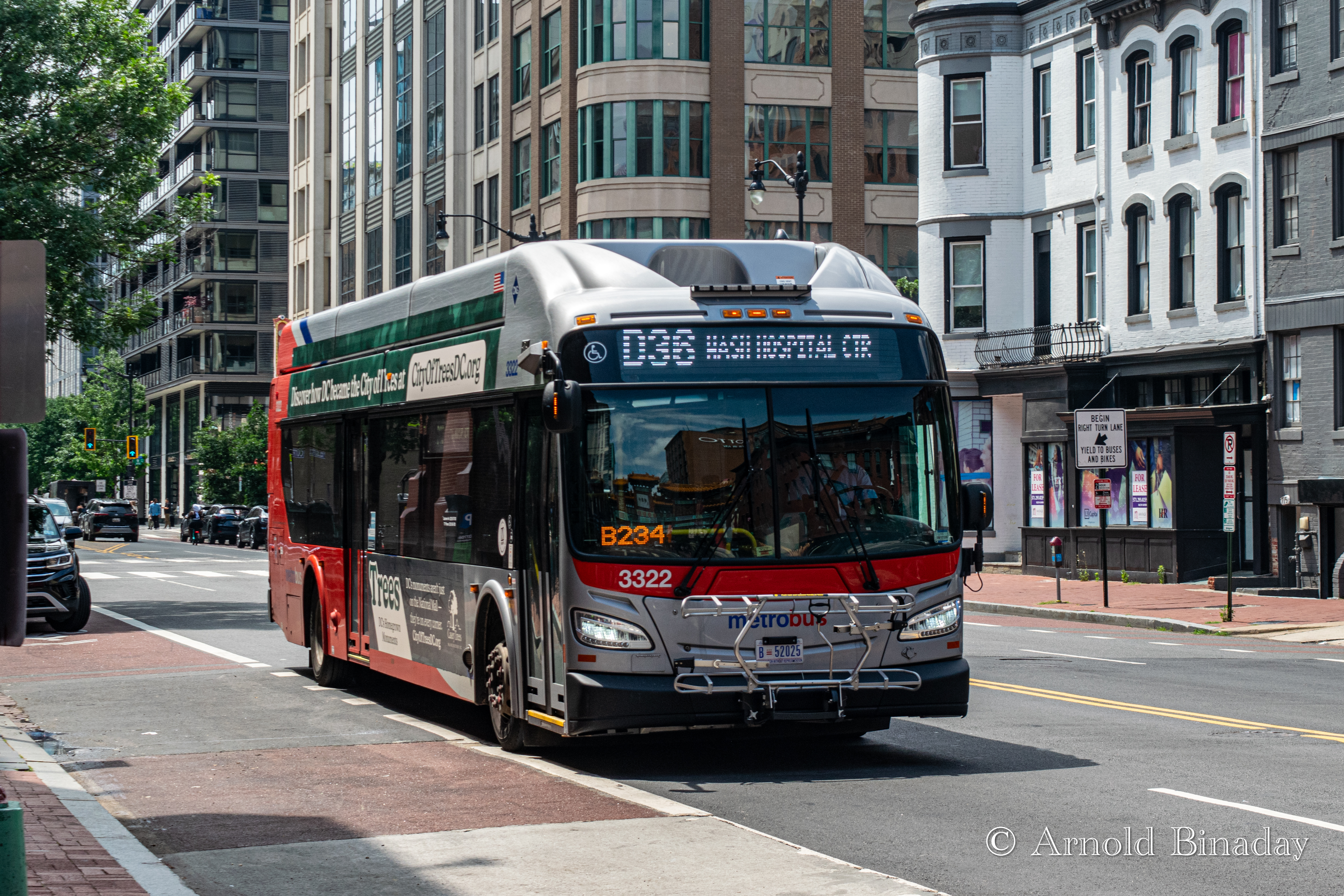
- Route D36 at Gallery Place-Chinatown

Overview
- System: Metrobus
- Operator: Washington Metropolitan Area Transit Authority
- Garage: Bladensburg
- Livery: Local
- Status: In Service
- Began service: June 4, 1977

Route
- Locale: Northwest, Northeast
- Communities served: Stronghold, Edgewood, Eckington, Brentwood, Ivy City, Trinidad, NoMa, Mount Vernon Square, Chinatown, Downtown
- Landmarks served: Veterans Affairs Medical Center, MedStar National Rehabilitation Hospital, MedStar Washington Hospital Center, Children's National Hospital, Trinity Washington University, Rhode Island Avenue station, United States Postal Service Main Post Office, Gallery Place station, Metro Center station, Franklin Square, McPherson Square station
- Start: MedStar Washington Hospital Center
- Via: Franklin Street NE, Brentwood Road NE, Mount Olivet Road NE, Trinidad/Montello Avenues NE, K Street NE/NW
- End: Franklin Square
- Length: 50-60 minutes

Service
- Level: Daily
- Frequency: 20-30 minutes
- Operates: 5:03 AM - 12:10 AM
- Ridership: 430,403 (D4, FY 2025); 961,365 (D8, FY 2025)
- Timetable: K Street-Ivy City Line

The K Street-Ivy City Line, designated Route D36, is a daily bus route operated by the Washington Metropolitan Area Transit Authority between MedStar Washington Hospital Center and Franklin Square. The line operates every 20 minutes during the daytime and 30 minutes at night. Route D36 trips are roughly 50-60 minutes long.

== Route Description ==
Route D36 operates daily between Franklin Square and MedStar Washington Hospital Center connecting the hospital centers and Metrorail stations. The line also connected small neighborhoods to Metrorail stations. Route D36 operates out of Bladensburg division.

== History ==
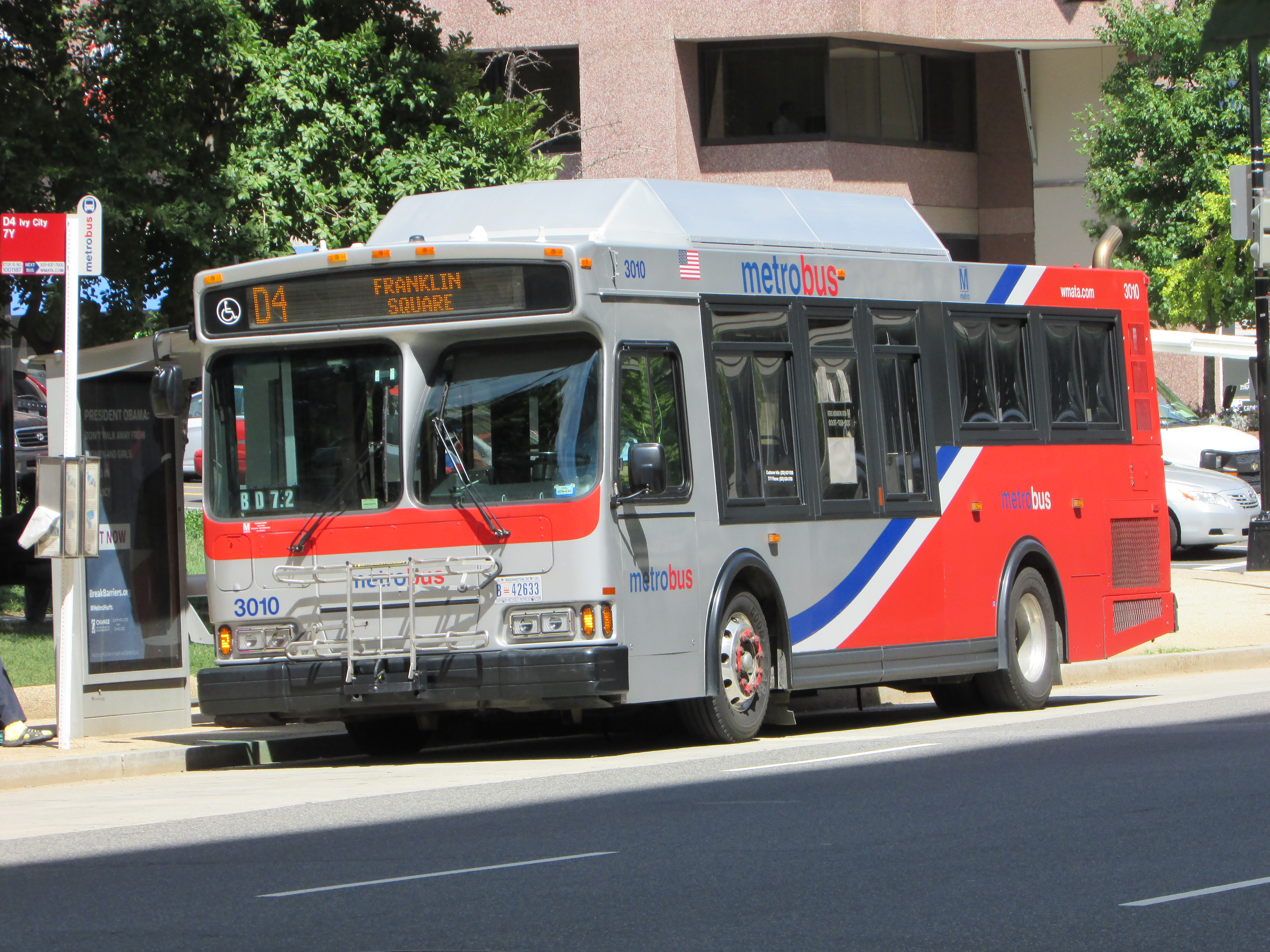
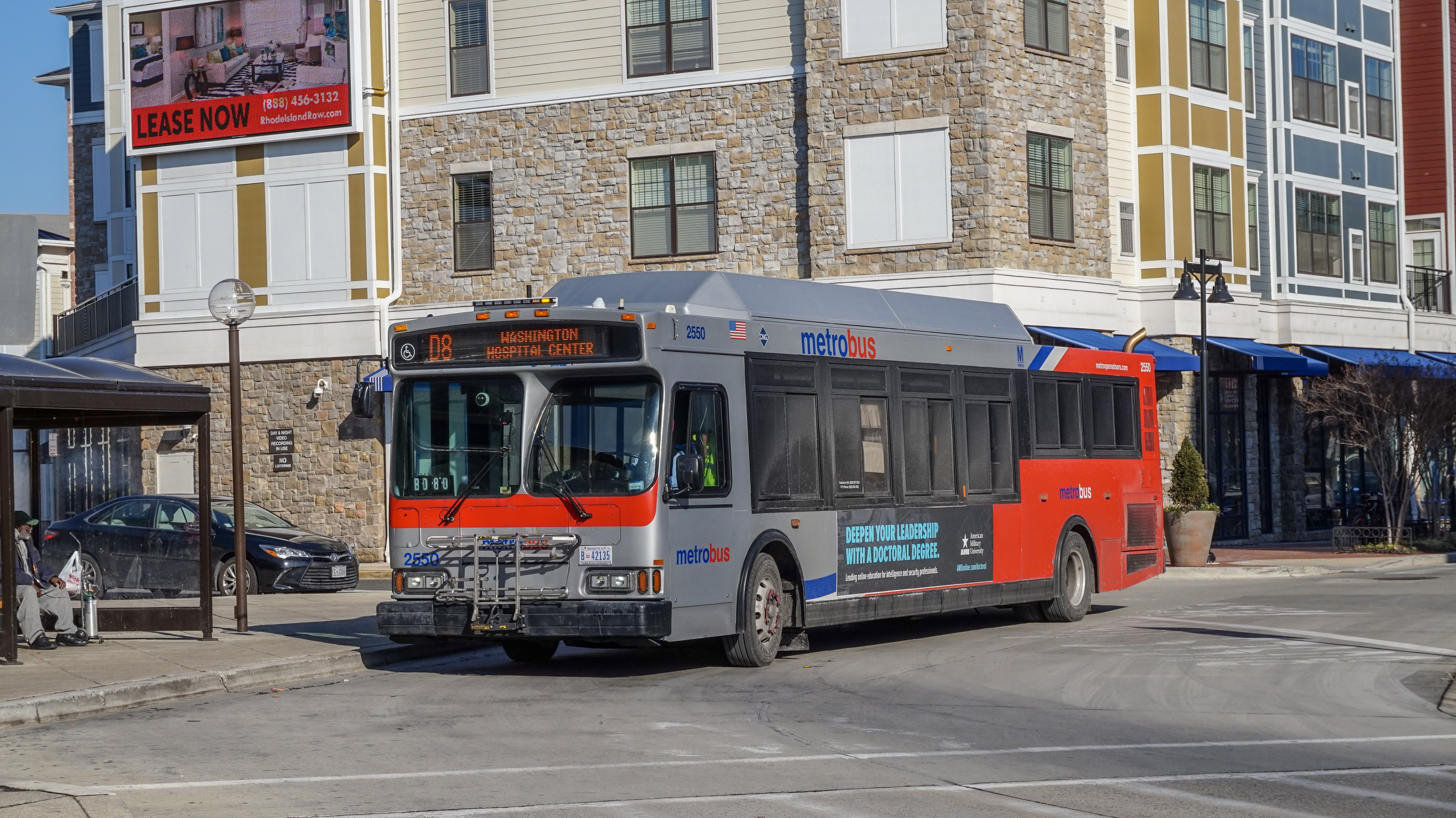
Former Routes D4 and D8.

Route D4 began operation under the Washington Railway & Electric Company operating under streetcar lines operating between Ivy City and Downtown DC. The line was converted to bus in the 1920s and later acquired by the Capital Traction Company in 1933. DC Transit would acquire CTC in 1956 and later run by WMATA in 1973.

The D4 would mainly operate along K Street and MacArthur Boulevard between Sibley Memorial Hospital and Ivy City connecting Downtown. The line was named the Glover Park-Trinidad Line.

Route D8 originally operated between Friendship Heights and Distaff Hall (Army Distaff Foundation Inc) until the 1970s.

Route D8 was created as a new route on June 4, 1977 to operate between Washington Hospital Center and Sibley Hospital alongside route D6, via the Hospital Complex, Trinity University, Glenwood Cemetery, the Edgewood Terrace Apartments, the Rhode Island Avenue Shopping Center, the Rhode Island Avenue–Brentwood station, Washington Union Station, Judiciary Square, Metro Center, and Dupont Circle stations.

When Dupont Circle station opened on January 15, 1977, the D6 and D8 did begin serving Dupont Circle in the middle of their routes. No changes were made in their route.

In March 1995, the line was split into two routes in order to simplify the line.

Route D4 was shortened to Washington Union Station with service to Sibley Memorial Hospital replaced by route D3, and D6. The line was also renamed to the Ivy City-Union Station Line. These changes were in order to simplify the line after a series of proposals.

Route D6 was split to operate between Sibley Hospital & the Stadium–Armory station, via Washington Union Station, instead of operating to Washington Hospital Center in order to replace the segment of the former routes 40, 42, and 44 between Union Station and Stadium–Armory station when both 40 and 44 were discontinued and 42 was shortened to operate between Mount Pleasant and Metro Center station.

Route D8 was also split to only operate between Washington Hospital Center Washington Union Station. The segment of D8's routing west of Union Station was replaced by routes D1, D3, and D6. At the same time, the D8 replaced the segment of D6's former routing between Union Station and Washington Hospital Center, via Rhode Island Avenue–Brentwood station.

As a result, as route D6 became a part of the Sibley Hospital–Stadium Armory Line, which operated alongside routes D1 and D3, the D4 became the Ivy City–Franklin Square Line, and D8 became a part of the Hospital Center Line.

On December 27, 2009, route D4 was rerouted to serve Franklin Square/McPherson Square station instead of Washington Union Station terminating along 13th and I streets NW. Service to Union Station was replaced by route D6. Buses will operate along I Street to 14th street, then continue via 14th, K and 10th streets, New York and Massachusetts Avenues, 6th Street and K Street to North Capitol Street where it will resume its regular route.

Originally, WMATA proposed to extend the D4 into Georgetown to serve Sibley Memorial Hospital instead of ending at Franklin Square.

In 2012, WMATA proposed to extend route D4 to Fort Totten station and Riggs Park via 18th Street NE, South Dakota Avenue NE, Sargent Road, Eastern Avenue, Kennedy Street, Nicholson Street and Riggs Road. This was in order to replace the E2 which is proposed to be shorten to Fort Totten and fully replace routes E3 and E4, Provide a direct route from Riggs Park, South Dakota Avenue, and 18th Street to Downtown, serve the proposed future Walmart stores on Riggs Road and at Bladensburg Road & New York Avenue, and ridership on the Fenwick/New York/16th loop is minimal since the Hecht's Warehouse closed. The Ivy City loop along Fenwick Street, New York Avenue, and 16th Street NE would be eliminated.

In 2014, WMATA proposed to shorten the D8 to Rhode Island Avenue station and to have a new Route D7 to operate between Rhode Island Avenue and the hospital campus in order to Improve reliability of service by operating shorter routes, Reduce the number of buses operating on the congested hospital roadways, and Create a better balance of capacity and demand throughout the line.

In 2015, WMATA proposed to extend route D4 to Kennedy Center in order to replace route 80 which was proposed to be shorten to Franklin Square. This would give D4 service to Farragut Square, Foggy Bottom, and the Watergate complex.

On June 26, 2016, every other route D4 trip was extended to Dupont Circle station (20th & P Streets NW) serving both Dupont Circle and Farragut Square in order to partially replace route D3. The extension would only operate during the weekday peak-hours in the peak direction. This gives passengers weekday peak service to Farragut Square and Dupont Circle without having to transfer buses at Franklin Square.

In 2019, WMATA proposed to eliminate route D4 service after 10:00 PM daily due to low ridership. There would be no alternative service however.

The proposal was met with controversy with Ivy City residents due to service being lacking with service if the proposal goes through since the E2 was also proposed to end at 10:00 PM too. WMATA later backed out of the proposal due to major customer opposition.

During the COVID-19 pandemic, both Routes D4 and D8 were reduced to operate on its Saturday supplemental schedule during the weekdays beginning on March 16, 2020. On March 18, 2020, both lines were further reduced to operate on its Sunday schedule. Weekend service on both lines were later suspended on March 21, 2020. Additional service and weekend service was restored on August 23, 2020 but D4 service to Dupont Circle was still suspended.

On September 26, 2020, WMATA proposed to eliminate all Route D4 service to Dupont Circle due to low federal funding in response. Weekday service on both D4 and D8 would also continued to be reduced. In February 2021 during WMATA's FY2022 budget crisis, WMATA propose to eliminate both the D4 and D8 in the second half of the fiscal year between January and June 2022.

On June 10, 2021, WMATA proposed to restore the D4's pre-pandemic schedule and increase the D8 to operate every 20 minutes daily between 7:00 AM to 9:00 PM daily as part of WMATA's Pandemic Recovery Plan. However service to Dupont Circle on Route D4 would be eliminated.

On September 5, 2021, all D4 service to Dupont Circle was eliminated, which had been suspended since March 16, 2020 due to the COVID-19 pandemic. Route D4 also restored its pre-pandemic schedule while Route D8 was increase to operate every 20 minutes daily between 7:00 AM to 9:00 PM.

In 2024 during WMATA's FY2024 Budget crisis, WMATA proposed to eliminate all weekend D4 service, and reduce the frequency of buses from 20 minutes to 30 minutes daily on the D8. However on April 25, 2024, Metro’s Board of Directors approved a $4.8 billion capital and operating budget which avoided service cuts.

=== Better Bus Redesign ===
In 2022, WMATA launched its Better Bus Redesign project, which aimed to redesign the entire Metrobus Network and is the first full redesign of the agency's bus network in its history.

In April 2023, WMATA launched its Draft Visionary Network. As part of the drafts, WMATA proposed to rework the D4 and D8, renaming it as Route DC211 and having it operate between Brookland–CUA station and Washington Union Station via 7th Street NE, Franklin Street NE, Montana Avenue NE, West Virginia Avenue NE, Mount Olivet Road NE, Montello Avenue NE, Trinidad Avenue NE, and F Street NE. Service to Washington Hospital Center was replaced by Route DC303, which would operate between Washington Hospital Center and Potomac Park.

During WMATA's Revised Draft Visionary Network, WMATA renamed the DC211 to Route D36 and changed the route to follow similarly to the current Route D8, but was rerouted from its western terminus at Washington Union Station to Franklin Square, merging both the D8 and D4 into one route. This was done due to the DC303 proposal (which was named Route C59) being dropped, and strong opposition from residents from Trinidad that would have to transfer at Union Station, with many expressing their desire to maintain their connection to Downtown. Service to Union Station would be replaced by a rerouted E2 named Route C71. Service would also not operate through the Rhode Island Avenue station bus loop, instead stopping outside. All changes were then proposed during WMATA's 2025 Proposed Network.

On November 21, 2024, WMATA approved its Better Bus Redesign Network, with service on the H Street Line being simplified.

Beginning on June 29, 2025, both the D4 and D8 were merged and was renamed into the D36. The route follows the former D8 routing between MedStar Washington Hospital Center and K Street NE, but was rerouted to serve Franklin Square along the D4 routing. Service to Washington Union Station was replaced by the C71, which was a combination of the D4 and E2, except it turns onto North Capitol Street from K Street NE and serves Washington Union Station.
