= Metro Center station =

Metro rail station in Washington, D.C.

Metro Center
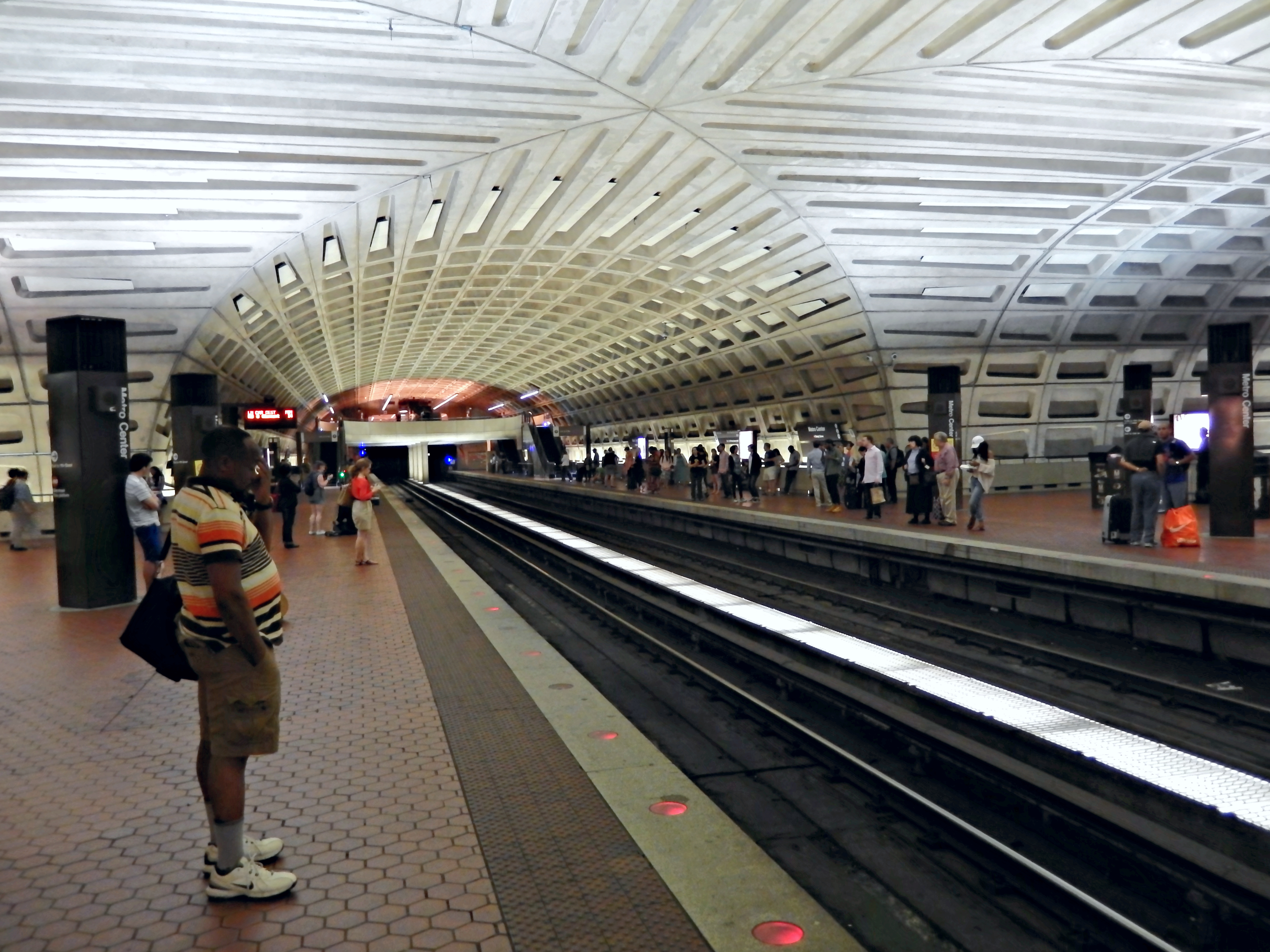
- The crossed vaults on the Red Line platforms at Metro Center station in May 2015

General information
- Location: 12 Street NW at G Street NW; Washington, D.C.
- Coordinates: 38°53′54″N 77°01′41″W
- Platforms: 2 side platforms (upper level); 1 island platform (lower level)
- Tracks: 4 (2 upper level, 2 lower level)
- Connections: Metrobus: A29, A49, D10, D20, D24, D30, D32, D34, D36, D44, D5X, D60, D6X, D94; MTA Maryland Bus: 901, 902, 904, 905; Loudoun County Transit; PRTC OmniRide; Ride Smart Northern Shenandoah Valley

Construction
- Structure type: Underground
- Cycle facilities: Capital Bikeshare, 8 racks
- Accessible: Yes

Other information
- Station code: A01 (upper level); C01 (lower level)

History
- Opened: March 27, 1976

Passengers
- 2025: 16,152 (average weekday)
- Rank: 2 of 98

Services
Preceding station	Washington Metro	Following station
Farragut North toward Shady Grove	Red Line	Gallery Place toward Glenmont
McPherson Square toward Vienna	Orange Line	Federal Triangle toward New Carrollton
McPherson Square toward Ashburn	Silver Line	Federal Triangle toward Downtown Largo or New Carrollton
McPherson Square toward Franconia–Springfield	Blue Line	Federal Triangle toward Downtown Largo
Former services
Preceding station	Washington Metro	Following station
Farragut North Terminus	Green Line Commuter Shortcut	Gallery Place toward Greenbelt
Route map
Location

Metro Center station is the central hub station of the Washington Metro, a rapid transit system in Washington, D.C. The station is located in Downtown, centered on the intersection of 12th Street NW and G Street NW. It is one of the 4 major transfer points in the Metrorail network. The Red Line portion of Metro Center station opened on March 27, 1976, as part of the first section of the Metro system.

The station averages 14,110 daily riders as of October 2025, making it the second-busiest in the system after Union Station.

== Station layout ==
Metro Center station is laid out in two underground levels in a cross shape centered on the intersection of 12th Street NW and G Street NW. The lower level runs north-south under 12th Street between F Street and H Street, with one island platform for the Orange Line, Silver Line, and Blue Line. The upper level runs east-west under G Street between 11th Street and 13th Street, with two side platforms for the Red Line, with wide corridors above the lower level platform and tracks. Mezzanines are located above the tracks at both ends of the upper platforms.

Entrances are located on G Street at 11th Street (southeast corner), F Street at 12th Street (northeast corner), and G Street and 13th Street (southeast corner); and at the southwest corner of 12th Street and F Street. Only the 12th Street and G Street entrance has a surface elevator. The station also provides direct indoor access to the Macy's Downtown–Metro Center department store at 1201 G Street NW, allowing passengers to enter the store without going outside.

== History ==
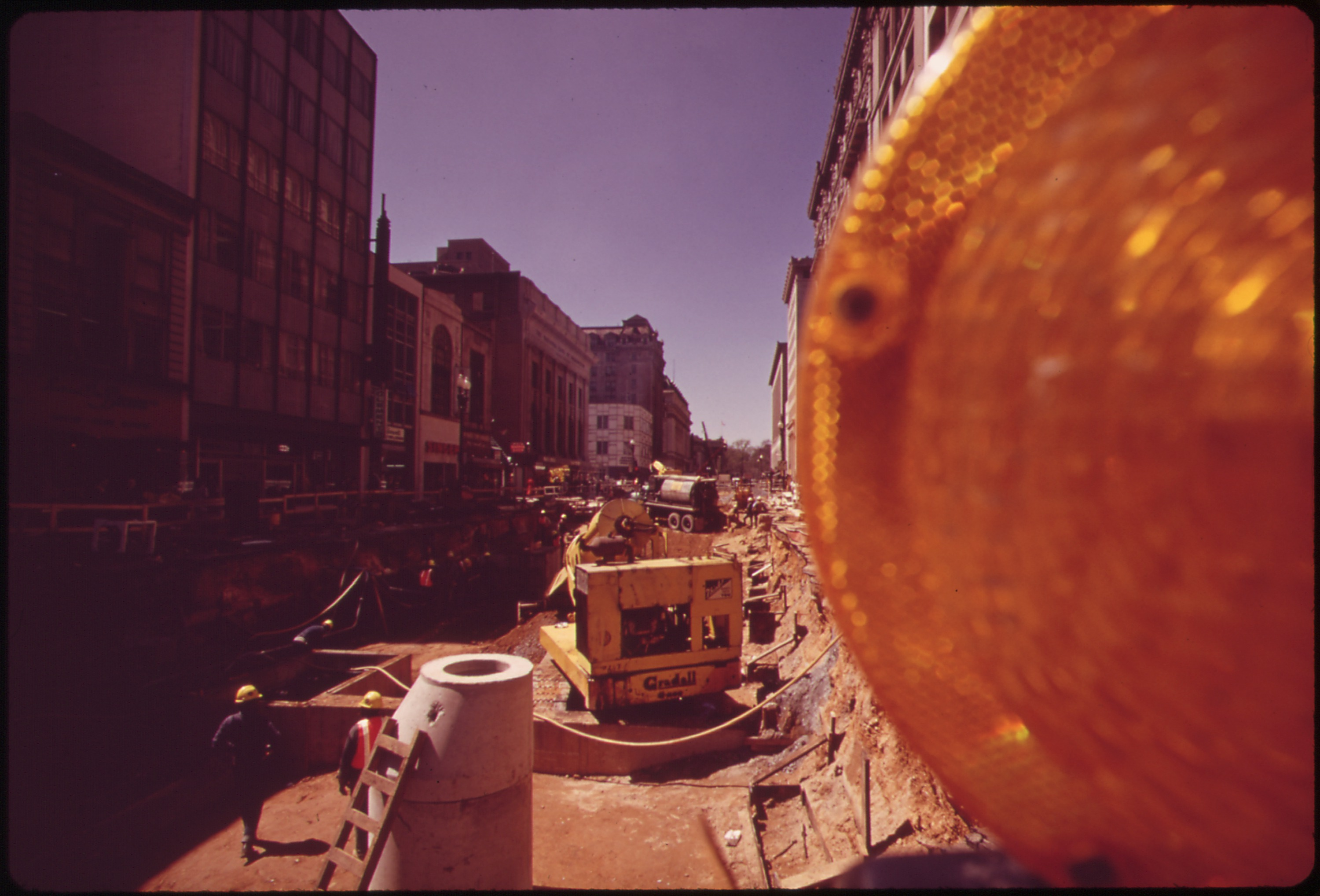
Station construction in 1973

Metro Center was one of the original 6 stations to open with the first section of the Red Line on March 27, 1976. The original name of the station was "12th and G", but WMATA planner William Herman argued it should be renamed, given the importance of the station and the fact that several entrances would be on other streets. Jackson Graham, the WMATA general manager at the time, agreed, and gave Herman twenty seconds to come up with a better name. Herman responded with the first words that came to mind: "Metro Center".

The upper level with the Red Line opened on March 27, 1976 with the rest of the initial segment from Farragut North to Rhode Island Avenue-Brentwood. The lower level opened on July 1, 1977 with the initial segment of the Blue Line from Ronald Reagan Washington National Airport to Stadium-Armory. Orange Line service began on November 20, 1979 with the opening of the segment from Stadium–Armory to New Carrollton. Silver line service began on July 26, 2014 with the opening of the segment from East Falls Church to Wiehle-Reston East.

A pedestrian tunnel to nearby Gallery Place–Chinatown has been proposed to connect all six Metro lines within fare control. A study was published in July 2005. The station was closed from January 16–21, 2021, because of security concerns due to the Inauguration of Joe Biden.
