= Federal Triangle station =

Washington Metro station

Coordinates: 38.893814°N 77.028515°W

Federal Triangle
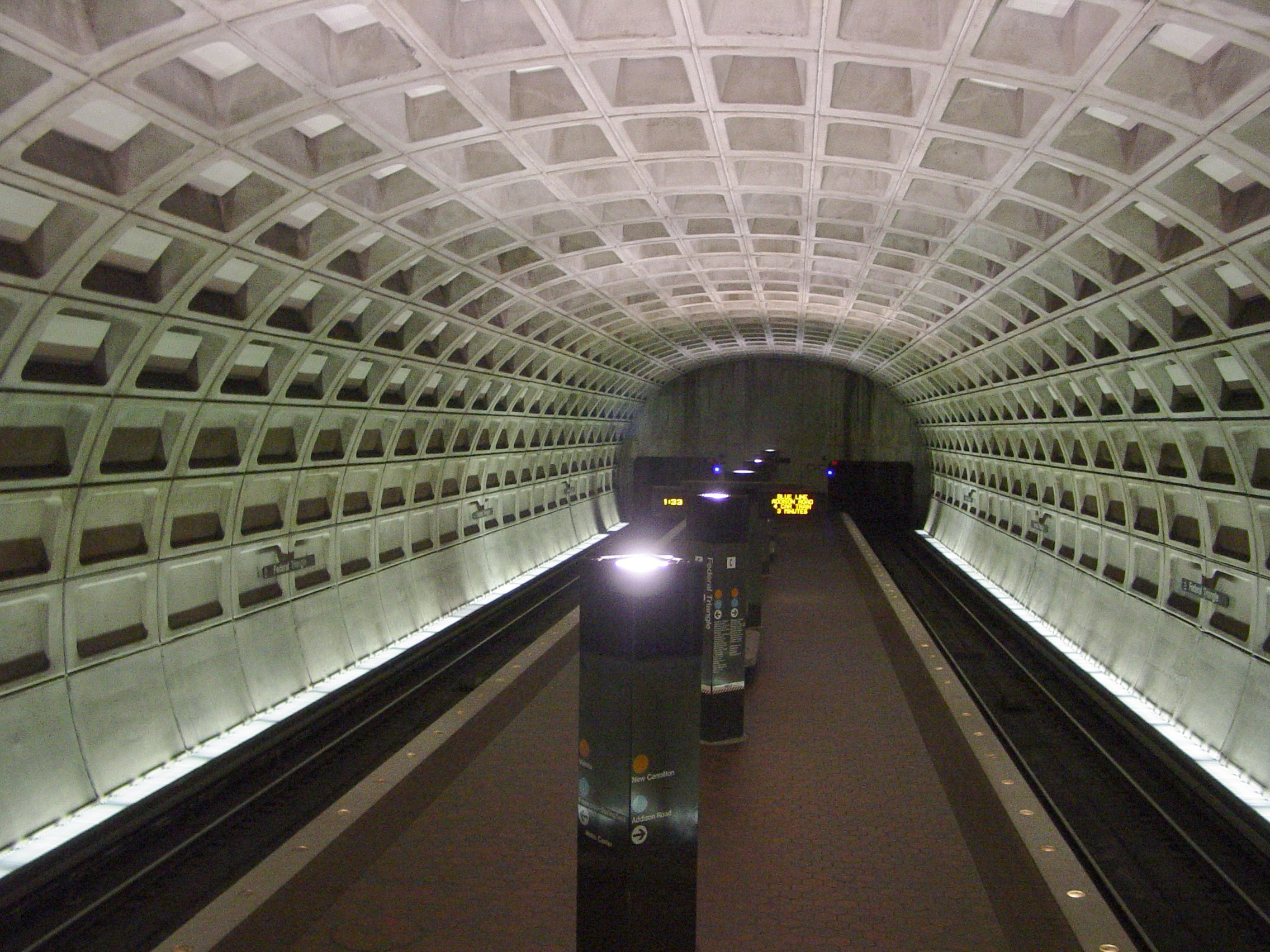
- Station platform in January 2004

General information
- Location: 302 12th Street NW; Washington, D.C.
- Owner: Washington Metropolitan Area Transit Authority
- Platforms: 1 island platform
- Tracks: 2
- Connections: Metrobus: D10, D1X, D30, D32, D44, D60, D6X; Fairfax Connector: 697; Loudoun County Transit; MTA Maryland Commuter Bus; PRTC OmniRide

Construction
- Structure type: Underground
- Cycle facilities: 20 racks
- Accessible: Yes

Other information
- Station code: D01

History
- Opened: July 1, 1977; 49 years ago

Passengers
- 2025: 5,344 (average weekday)
- Rank: 27 of 98

Services
Preceding station	Washington Metro	Following station
Metro Center toward Vienna	Orange Line	Smithsonian toward New Carrollton
Metro Center toward Ashburn	Silver Line	Smithsonian toward Downtown Largo or New Carrollton
Metro Center toward Franconia–Springfield	Blue Line	Smithsonian toward Downtown Largo
Route map
Location

Federal Triangle station is a Washington Metro station in Washington, D.C., United States. The island-platformed station was opened on July 1, 1977, and is operated by the Washington Metropolitan Area Transit Authority (WMATA). Providing service for the Blue, Orange, and Silver Lines, the station's entrance is beneath the William Jefferson Clinton Federal Building.

== History ==
The station opened on July 1, 1977. Its opening coincided with the completion of 11.8 miles (19.0 km) of rail between National Airport and RFK Stadium and the opening of the Arlington Cemetery, Capitol South, Crystal City, Eastern Market, Farragut West, Federal Center SW, Foggy Bottom–GWU, L'Enfant Plaza, McPherson Square, National Airport, Pentagon, Pentagon City, Potomac Avenue, Rosslyn, Smithsonian, and Stadium–Armory stations. Orange Line service to the station began upon the line's opening on November 20, 1978. Silver Line service at Federal Triangle began on July 26, 2014.

On January 13, 1982, an eastbound Metro train on the Orange Line derailed just east of the station resulting in three fatalities, the first fatalities in the system's history.

From March 26, 2020 until June 28, 2020, this station was closed due to the COVID-19 pandemic.

Between January 15 to January 21, 2021, this station was closed because of security concerns due to the Inauguration of Joe Biden.

== Location ==
The station serves an area of Washington crowded with federal buildings, on 12th Street between Pennsylvania Avenue NW and Constitution Avenue NW, including the triangular area formed by 15th Street, Constitution, and Pennsylvania known as Federal Triangle, from which the station takes its name. The triangle includes such federal buildings as the Robert F. Kennedy Department of Justice Building, the Herbert C. Hoover Building (Department of Commerce), and the buildings of the Internal Revenue Service and the Environmental Protection Agency.

=== Flood Risk ===
The station and its surrounding neighborhood are susceptible to flooding, as the land was formerly a tributary of the Potomac River. Most notably, a 2006 flood led to the temporary closure of both Federal Triangle and Archives stations.

== Station layout ==
Federal Triangle utilizes the simple island platform layout. There are two tracks: track D1 is used for trains bound for New Carrollton and Largo, and track D2 is used for trains going to Franconia–Springfield, Vienna and Ashburn. As with all stations on the Metro, there are platform edge lights to warn passengers of incoming trains. In 2008, WMATA installed red-colored LED lights at Federal Triangle and centrally located stations after a successful pilot at Gallery Place. There is a coffered barrel-vault ceiling at Federal Triangle, as is typical of other Washington Metro stations built at that time.

There is only one entrance to the platform level, located slightly south of the center of the platform within a knockout panel for a proposed east entrance. Escalators from this mezzanine level lead to the plaza of the William Jefferson Clinton Federal Building.

== In popular culture ==
The station was featured in the 2007 film Breach.

== Notable places nearby ==
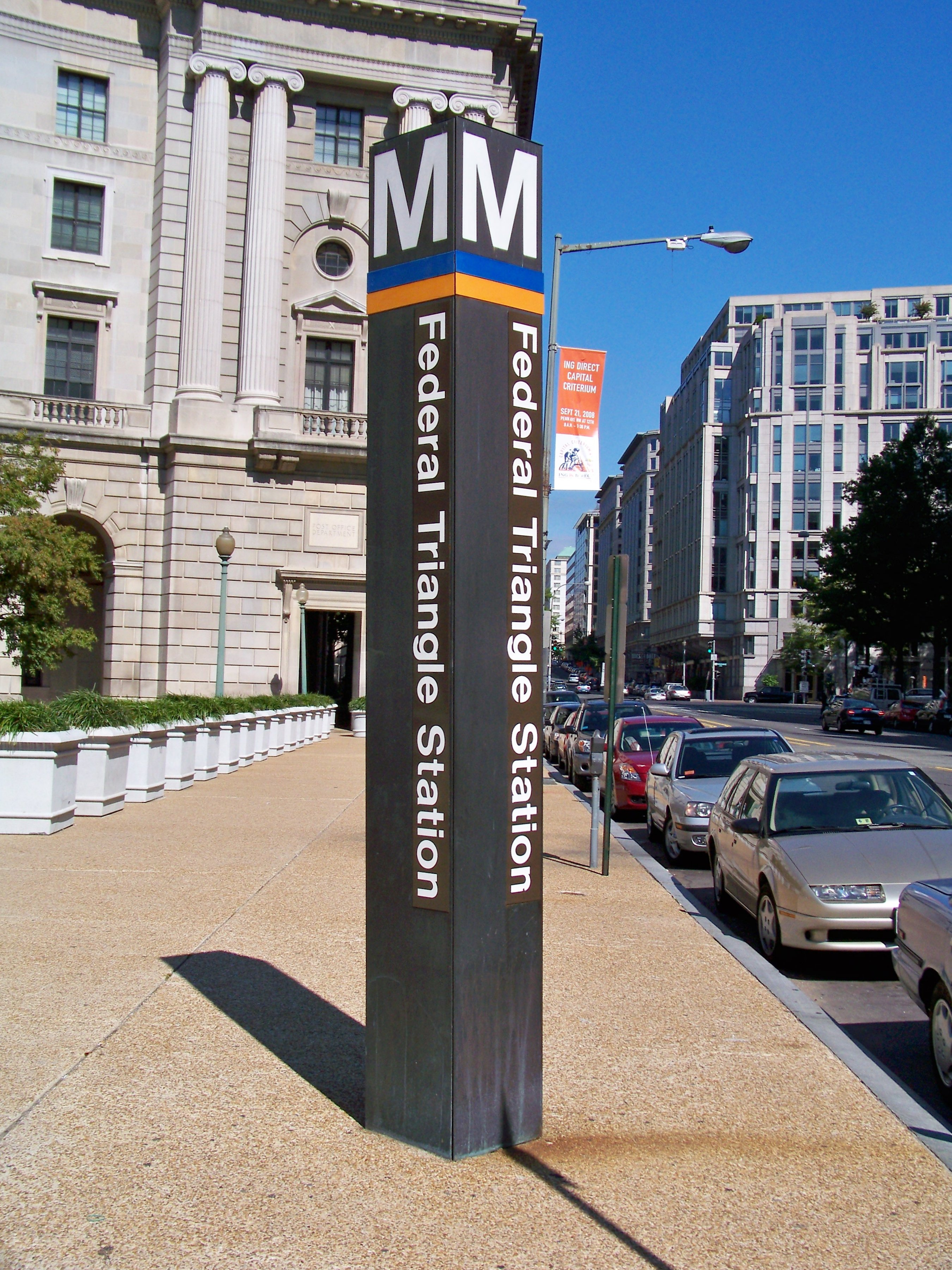
12th Street NW pylon

- Several federal government buildings in and near the Federal Triangle
  - William Jefferson Clinton Federal Building (United States Environmental Protection Agency headquarters
    - Andrew W. Mellon Auditorium
  - Robert F. Kennedy Department of Justice Building (Department of Justice headquarters)
  - Herbert C. Hoover Building (Department of Commerce headquarters)
    - National Aquarium in Washington, D.C.
    - White House Visitor Center
  - Environmental Protection Agency
  - J. Edgar Hoover Building (Federal Bureau of Investigation headquarters)
  - Old Post Office (Waldorf=Astoria Hotel)
  - Ronald Reagan Building and International Trade Center
- Freedom Plaza
- National World War I Memorial
- National Mall
  - Several Smithsonian Institution museums on the Mall, including the National Museum of American History and National Museum of Natural History
