= Rhode Island Avenue station =

Washington Metro station

Rhode Island Avenue Brentwood
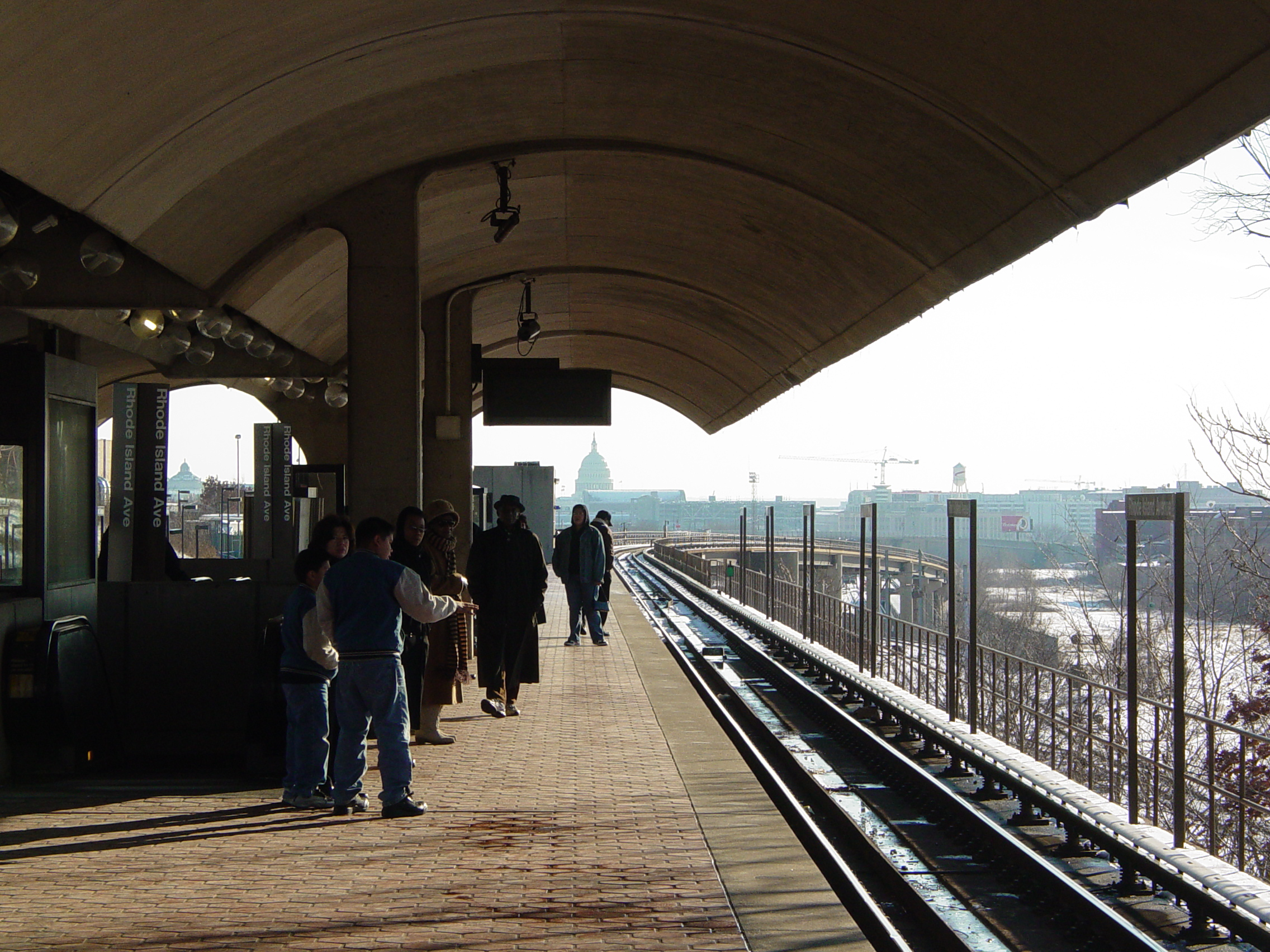
- Rhode Island Avenue station platform in February 2003 with the United States Capitol in the distance

General information
- Location: 919 Rhode Island Avenue NE; Washington, D.C.
- Coordinates: 38.920741°N 76.995984°W
- Owner: Washington Metropolitan Area Transit Authority
- Platforms: 1 island platform
- Tracks: 2
- Connections: Metrobus: D32, D36, D74, P10, P1X, P40; Metropolitan Branch Trail

Construction
- Structure type: Elevated
- Parking: 221 spaces
- Cycle facilities: Capital Bikeshare, 12 racks
- Accessible: Yes

Other information
- Station code: B04

History
- Opened: March 27, 1976; 50 years ago
- Former names: Rhode Island Avenue (1976–2004)

Passengers
- 2025: 4,975 (average weekday)
- Rank: 32 of 98

Services
Preceding station	Washington Metro	Following station
NoMa–Gallaudet U toward Shady Grove	Red Line	Brookland–CUA toward Glenmont

Former Services
Preceding station	Washington Metro	Following station
Union Station toward Farragut North	Green Line Commuter Shortcut	Brookland-CUA toward Greenbelt
Route map
Location

Rhode Island Avenue station (also known as Rhode Island Avenue–Brentwood) is a Washington Metro station in Washington, D.C., on the Red Line. The station is located in the Brentwood neighborhood of Northeast, on an elevated platform crossing Rhode Island Avenue NE (U.S. Route 1)

== History ==
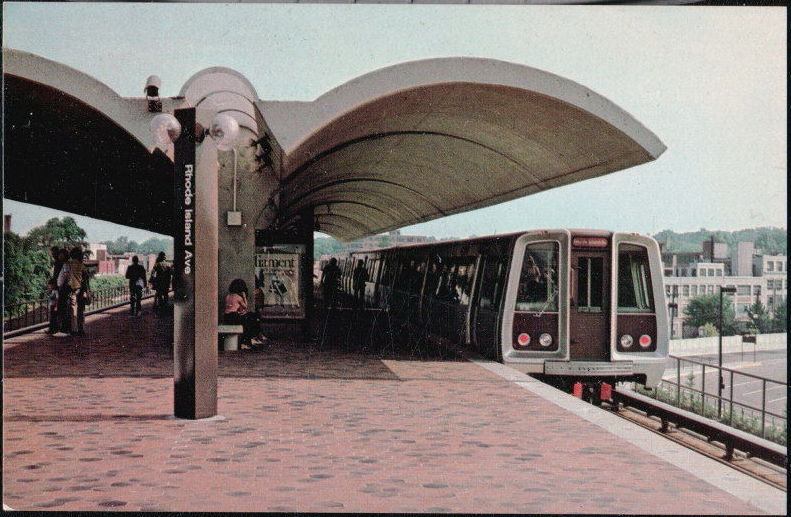
Rhode Island Avenue station in August 1976

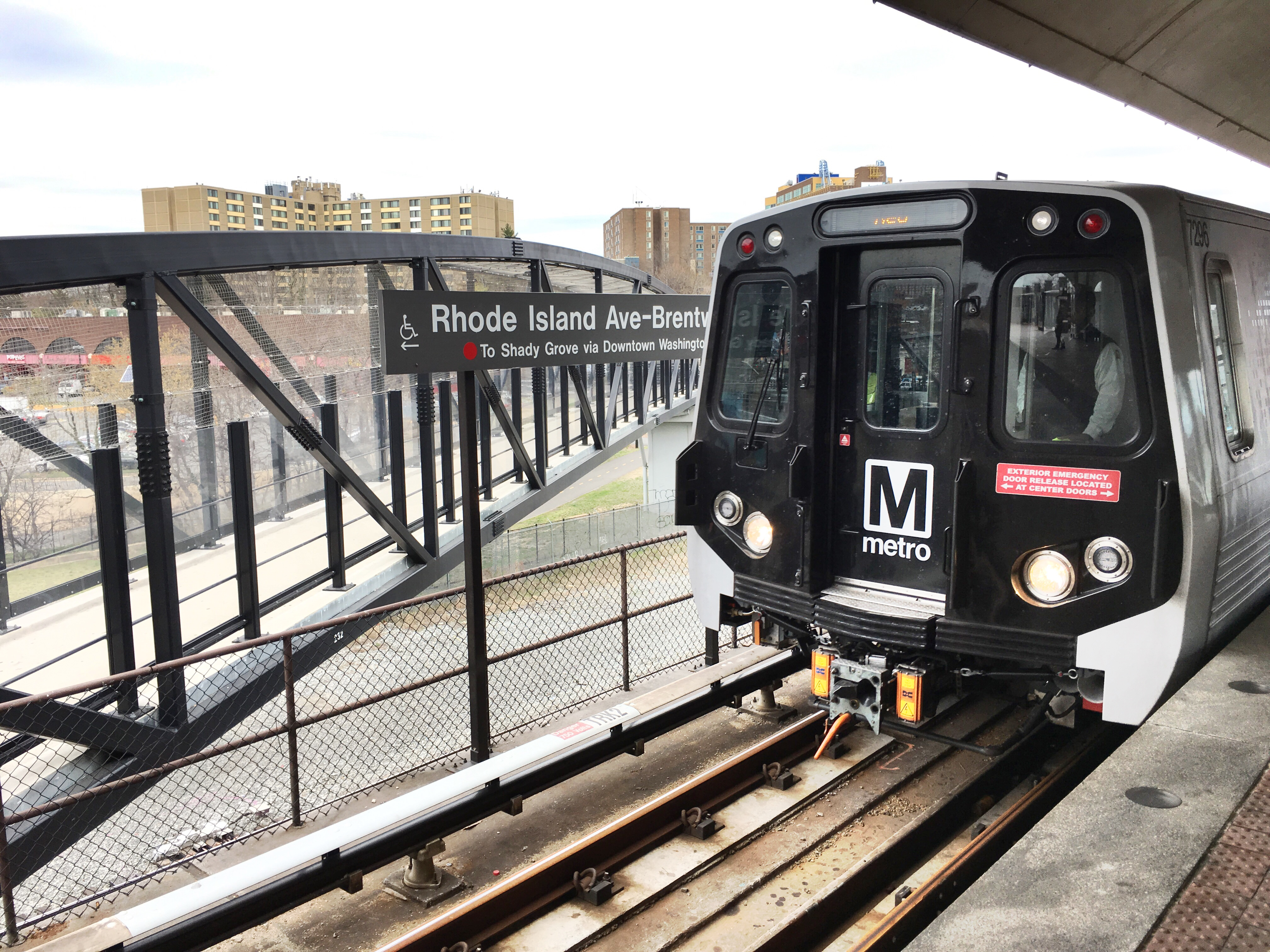
Shady Grove-bound Red Line train arriving at the station in March 2017

The station was built on land formerly part of the African-American Columbian Harmony Cemetery. When the station was constructed in 1976, workers discovered that not all the bodies had been moved. At least five coffins were unearthed, and numerous bones. A plaque was affixed to a column near one of the station's entrances to commemorate the former cemetery. When a parking lot at the site was renovated in 1979, more bones and bits of cloth and coffins were unearthed.

Service began on March 27, 1976, as one of the first stations in the system, opening as the eastern terminus of the Red Line. It was replaced as the eastern terminus by Silver Spring on February 6, 1978.

From the time the station opened on March 27, 1976, all the way up until November 20, 2004, the station was originally just named, "Rhode Island Avenue". However; on November 20, 2004, during exactly the same time WMATA opened its brand new "New York Avenue - Florida Avenue - Galludet University" Metrorail Station in between the Rhode Island Avenue Metro Station & Union Station, the "Rhode Island Avenue" Metro Station, was officially renamed, "Rhode Island Avenue - Brentwood" in recognition of the Brentwood neighborhood in Northeast Washington, D.C., which the station is located in. However; this particular name change of the Rhode Island Avenue Metro Station, was only initially reflected on WMATA's Metrorail Rider Guides, System Maps, and on most of WMATA's newer/updated Metrobus Schedules for each of the Metrobus Routes that served the Rhode Island Avenue Metro Station. The pylons and station signage, on the other hand, did not officially reflect the new name change of the station, until they were eventually replaced with brand new pylons and station signage during July/August, 2005.

In the summer of 2018 from July 21 to September 3, the station was shut down for platform repairs due to settling of the platform and decaying concrete caused by salty de-icer used in the winter.

=== Future improvements ===
In May 2018, Metro announced an extensive renovation of platforms at twenty stations across the system. The platforms at the Rhode Island Avenue–Brentwood station would be rebuilt starting in September 2020.

== Station layout ==
The station's main entrance is located just south of Rhode Island Avenue on Washington Street N.E. The station's island platform is stated to have the highest elevation of any Metro station in the system.

== Notable places nearby ==
- WMATA's Brentwood Rail Yard
- USPS Washington Main Office
- Edgewood Terrace Apartment Complex
- Basilica of the National Shrine of the Immaculate Conception Building
