= 100 series =

100 series may refer to:

== Train types ==
=== Japan ===
- 100 Series Shinkansen, a Japanese Shinkansen high-speed train type
- Choshi Electric Railway 100 series electric multiple unit
- Keisei AE100 series electric multiple unit
- KiHa 100 series diesel multiple unit
- Meitetsu 100 series electric multiple unit
- Tobu 100 series Spacia electric multiple unit

=== Other ===
- Buenos Aires Underground 100 Series

== Other ==
- 100-series highways (Nova Scotia), a series of arterial highways in the Canadian province of Nova Scotia
- Lenovo IdeaPad 100, a discontinued brand of notebook computers
- GeForce 100 series graphics proccesing units produced by Nvidia

== See also ==
- Series 1
- 100s (disambiguation)
- 100 (disambiguation)
- 1000 series (disambiguation)

Preceded by Series 91-99 (disambiguation)	100 series	Succeeded by Series 101-199 (disambiguation)
Preceded by Series 90 (disambiguation)	100 series	Succeeded by Series 101-199 (disambiguation)
Preceded by Series 0 (disambiguation)	100 series	Succeeded by 200 series (disambiguation)
