= 1000 series =

1000 series may refer to:

== Japanese train types ==
- Chichibu Railway 1000 series
- Choshi Electric Railway 1000 series
- Fukuoka Subway 1000 series
- Hankyu 1000 series (1954), 1954–1989
- Hankyu 1000 series, since 2013
- Hanshin 1000 series
- JR Shikoku 1000 series
- Keihan 1000 series, operated by the Keihan Electric Railway
- Keikyu 1000 series
- Keikyu N1000 series
- Keio 1000 series
- Meitetsu 1000 series
- Nagano 1000 series, operated by the Nagano Electric Railway
- Nagoya Municipal Subway N1000 series
- Odakyu 1000 series
- Osaka Monorail 1000 series
- Sendai Subway 1000 series
- Tokyo Metro 1000 series
- Tokyo Monorail 1000 series
- Tokyu 1000 series
- Tōyō Rapid 1000 series
- TX-1000 series, operated by Tsukuba Express

== Other uses ==
- ATP Masters 1000 tournaments, a series of tennis tournaments
- GeForce 1000 Series, graphics processing units
- Rohr 1000-series, Washington Metro rolling stock

== See also ==
- Class 1000 Shinkansen
