= Series 70 =

Series 70 may refer to:

== Transport ==
- Oldsmobile Series 70, automobile series
- Cadillac Series 70, automobile series
- Buick Series 70, automobile series

== Computing ==
- UNIVAC Series 70, line of computers

Preceded by Series 61-69 (disambiguation)	Series 70	Succeeded by Series 71-79 (disambiguation)
Preceded by Series 60 (disambiguation)	Series 70	Succeeded by Series 80 (disambiguation)
