= Series 51-59 =

Series 51 to Series 59 may refer to:

- Area 51 (series), the game series
- nRF51 series, Nordic Semiconductor chips series
- GAZ-51, USSR truck series
- 52 series, the Japanese train series
- 52 Super Series, the yacht racing series
- Series 54 (SNCB), diesel locomotives series
- Linksys WRT54G series, line of routers
- Mitsui 56 series, cargo ship series
- WPC 56, British TV series
- KiHa 59 series, the Japanese train series

| Preceded by Series 50 (disambiguation) | Series 51-59 | Succeeded by Series 60 (disambiguation) |
