= Series 60 (disambiguation) =

Series 60 may refer to:

== Transport ==
- Oldsmobile Series 60, automobile series
- Cadillac Series 60, automobile series
- Buick Series 60, automobile series
- Nissan Patrol 60 Series, automobile series
- Detroit Diesel Series 60, line of diesel engines

== Computing ==
- Series 60 platform, software platform for Symbian smartphones
  - Series 60 browser, browser for Series 60 platform

Preceded by Series 51-59 (disambiguation)	Series 60	Succeeded by Series 61-69 (disambiguation)
Preceded by Series 50 (disambiguation)	Series 60	Succeeded by Series 70 (disambiguation)
