= 100s =

100s may refer to:

- The period from 100 to 199 AD, almost synonymous with the 2nd century (101–200)
- The period from 100 to 109 AD, known as the 100s (decade) almost synonymous with the 11th decade (101–110)
- The period from 199 to 100 BC, synonymous with the 2nd century BC
- The period from 109 to 100 BC, known as the 100s BC (decade)
- 100mm cigarettes, a tobacco product
- 100s (rapper) or Kossisko, American rapper
- One-hundred-base-unit banknotes

== See also ==
- 100 (disambiguation)
- 100 series (disambiguation)
