= Series 90 =

Series 90 may refer to:

== Aircraft ==
- Express Series 90, an American homebuilt aircraft design

== Computing ==
- UNIVAC Series 90, mainframe computers
- Series 90 (software platform), a platform for mobile phones that uses Symbian OS
- UNIVAC Series 90, line of mainframe computers

== Trains ==
- JNR 90 series, prototype of JNR 101 series electric multiple unit

Preceded by Series 81-89 (disambiguation)	Series 90	Succeeded by Series 91-99 (disambiguation)
Preceded by Series 80 (disambiguation)	Series 90	Succeeded by 100 series (disambiguation)
