= Series 80 =

Series 80 may refer to:

== Transport ==
- Oldsmobile Series 80, automobile series
- Cadillac Series 80, automobile series

== Computing ==
- Series 80 (software platform), a platform for mobile phones that uses Symbian OS
- HP Series 80, line of computers

== Other ==
- Colt Mk IV Series 80, the pistol line

Preceded by Series 71-79 (disambiguation)	Series 80	Succeeded by Series 81-89 (disambiguation)
Preceded by Series 70 (disambiguation)	Series 80	Succeeded by Series 90 (disambiguation)
