= Washington Metro rolling stock =

Trains operated by the Washington Metro

The rolling stock of the Washington Metro system consists of 1,242 75-foot (22.86 m) electric multiple unit railcars that were acquired across seven orders. All cars operate as married pairs (consecutively numbered even-odd), with systems shared across the pair. The 7000-series cars, the system's newest, have an operator's cab in only one of each married pair's cars (the even numbered one) and operate in groups of three or four.

The system's track gauge is 4 ft 8 1/4 in (1,429 mm) – 0.25 inches (6 mm) narrower than 4 ft 8 1/2 in (1,435 mm) standard gauge, but is not considered narrow gauge in the traditional sense despite the gauge. Also, at 40 inches (1,016 mm) above top of rail, the floor height of the cars is lower than that of most other East Coast mass transit systems, including New York City, Boston and Philadelphia.

As of February 2026, Metro owns a fleet of 1,216 railcars, 1,208 of which are active in revenue service.

Active railcars
Series	Manufacturer	Number purchased	Propulsion system	Entered service	Image	Planned year for retirement	Currently owned	Currently active	Planned replacement
3000	Breda (Refurbished by Alstom)	290	Alstom ONIX 2000 AC Traction with IGBT Inverters	1987 (Refurbished from 2004 to 2009)		2027	276	250	8000-series
6000	Alstom	184	Alstom ONIX 2000 AC Traction with IGBT Inverters	2005–2008		TBD	184	180 + 2 as money train	N/A
7000	Kawasaki	748	Toshiba SEA-430 AC Traction with IGBT Inverters	2013–2019		TBD	748	748	N/A

Retired railcars
Series	Manufacturer	Number purchased	Propulsion system	Entered service	Image	Retired	Currently owned	Replacement
1000	Rohr (Refurbished by Breda)	300	GE AC Traction with GTO Inverters	1973–1976 (Refurbished from 1993 to 1996)		2016–2017	2 preserved	7000-series
2000	Breda (Refurbished by Alstom)	76	Alstom ONIX 2000 AC Traction with IGBT Inverters	1982 (Refurbished from 2002 to 2004)		2024	2 preserved + 2 as money train	8000-series
4000	Breda	100	Westinghouse 1462 DC motors with chopper controls	1991		2017	2 preserved	7000-series
5000	CAF/AAI	192	Bombardier Mitrac DR1000 AC Traction with IGBT Inverters	2001		2018–2019	2 preserved	7000-series

Future railcars
Series	Manufacturer	Number purchased	Propulsion system	Year planned for entering service (estimate)	Notes
8000	Hitachi	256 (with options for up to 800) (proposed)	TBD	2027–2029	Replacing the 2000 and 3000-series railcars.

== Rail yards ==
There are ten Metrorail storage and overhaul facilities totaling more than 1,300,000 square feet (120,000 m^{2}) of workspace. One is currently under development.

Facility	Line	Opened	Storage	Location	Storage	Service & Inspection	Major Repair	Overhaul	Running Maintenance
Alexandria	Yellow Line (Washington Metro) Blue Line (Washington Metro)	1981	176	VA	✔	✔	No		✔
Branch Avenue	Green Line (Washington Metro)	2002	166	MD	✔	✔	No		✔
Brentwood	Red Line (Washington Metro)	1974	86	DC	✔	✔	✔		✔
Dulles	Silver Line (Washington Metro)	2022	184	VA	✔	✔	✔		✔
Falls Church	Orange Line (Washington Metro) Silver Line (Washington Metro)	1986	186	VA	✔	✔	No		✔
Greenbelt	Yellow Line (Washington Metro) Green Line (Washington Metro)	1995	284	MD	✔	✔	✔		✔
Glenmont	Red Line (Washington Metro)	1998	132	MD	✔	No	No		No
Landover	Orange Line (Washington Metro) Silver Line (Washington Metro)	2025	24	MD	✔	No	✔		No
New Carrollton	Orange Line (Washington Metro) Silver Line (Washington Metro)	1978	114	MD	✔	✔	No		✔
Shady Grove	Red Line (Washington Metro)	1983	168	MD	✔	✔	No		✔

== Active ==
=== Breda 3000-series ===
Washington Metro 3000-series
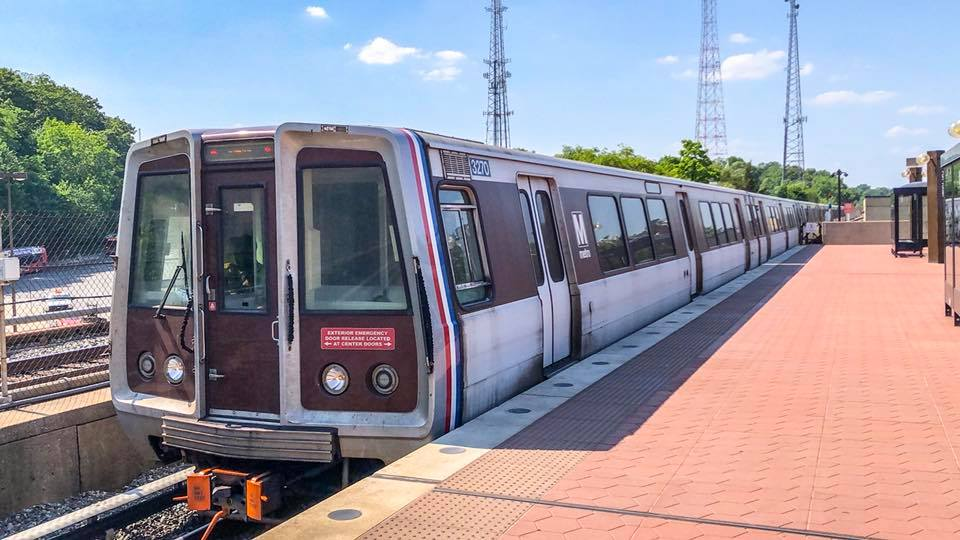
- Breda cars on the Red Line at Fort Totten in July 2018

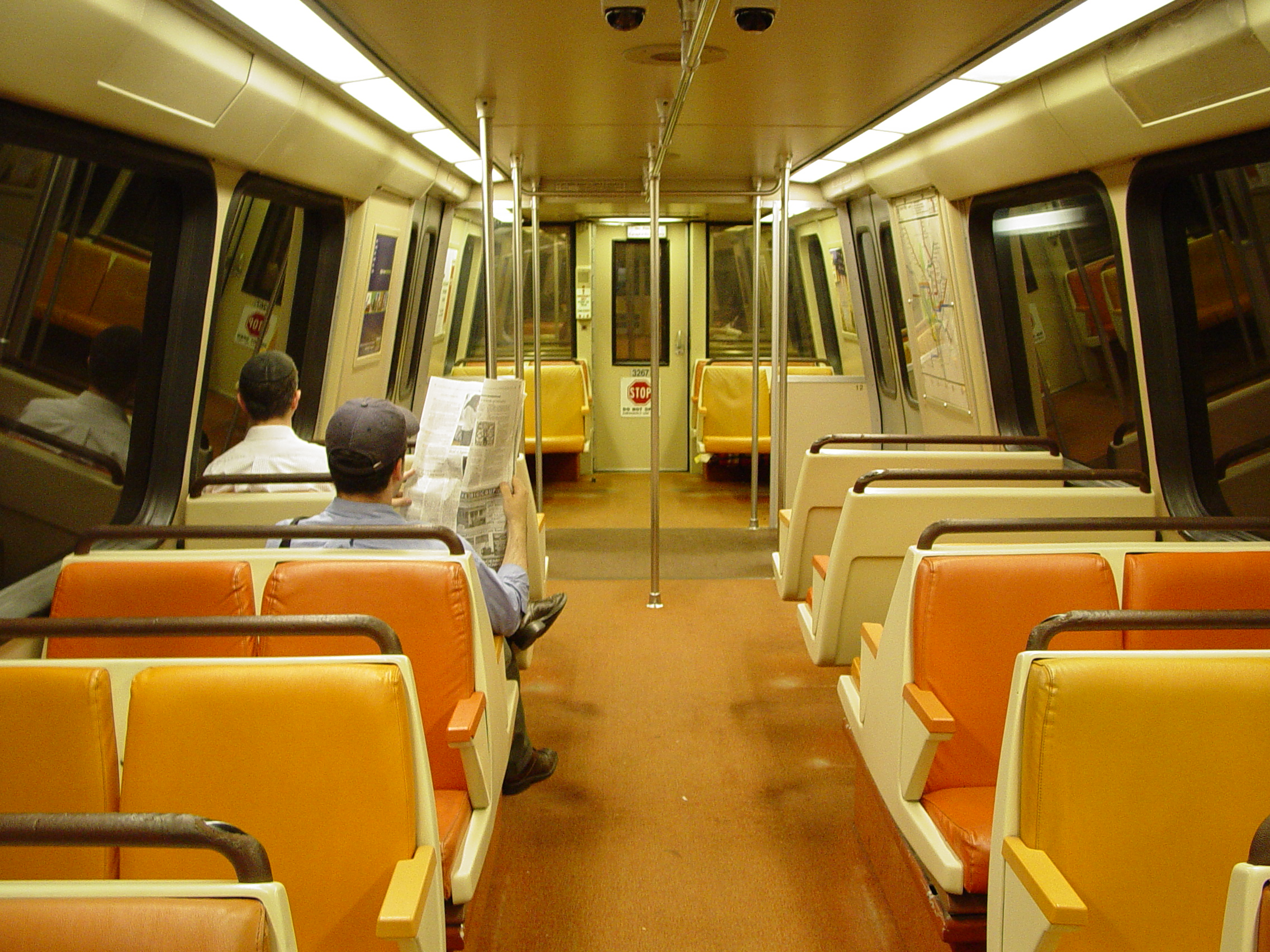
- Interior of Breda 3267 while riding through a tunnel prior to rehabilitation
- In service: 1987–present
- Manufacturer: Breda Costruzioni Ferroviarie
- Built at: Pistoia, Italy
- Constructed: 1984–1988
- Entered service: 1987
- Refurbished: 2004–2009 by Alstom
- Number built: 290
- Number in service: 250
- Fleet numbers: 3000–3291
- Capacity: Seating: 68; Total: 175
- Operator: WMATA

Specifications
- Car body construction: Extruded aluminum
- Train length: 600 ft (182.88 m) (8-car train)
- Car length: 75 ft (22.86 m)
- Width: 10 ft 1 3/4 in (3.09 m)
- Height: 10 ft 10 in (3.30 m)
- Floor height: 40 in (1,016 mm)
- Doors: Sliding, 6 per car
- Maximum speed: 75 mph (121 km/h)
- Traction system: Westinghouse chopper control (as built); Alstom ONIX 2000 2-level IGBT–VVVF (after refurbishment)
- Traction motors: DC motor (as built); 4 × Alstom 4 EXA 2122 165 kW (221 hp) 3-phase AC induction motor (after refurbishment)
- Power output: 1,320 kW (1,770 hp) (Note: This pertains to one married-pair.) (after refurbishment)
- Acceleration: 2.8 mph/s (4.5 km/(h⋅s))
- Electric systems: 750 V DC (nominal) from third rail
- Current collection: Contact shoe
- UIC classification: Bo′Bo′+Bo′Bo′
- AAR wheel arrangement: B-B+B-B
- Bogies: Fabricated steel
- Track gauge: 4 ft 8 1/4 in (1,429 mm)

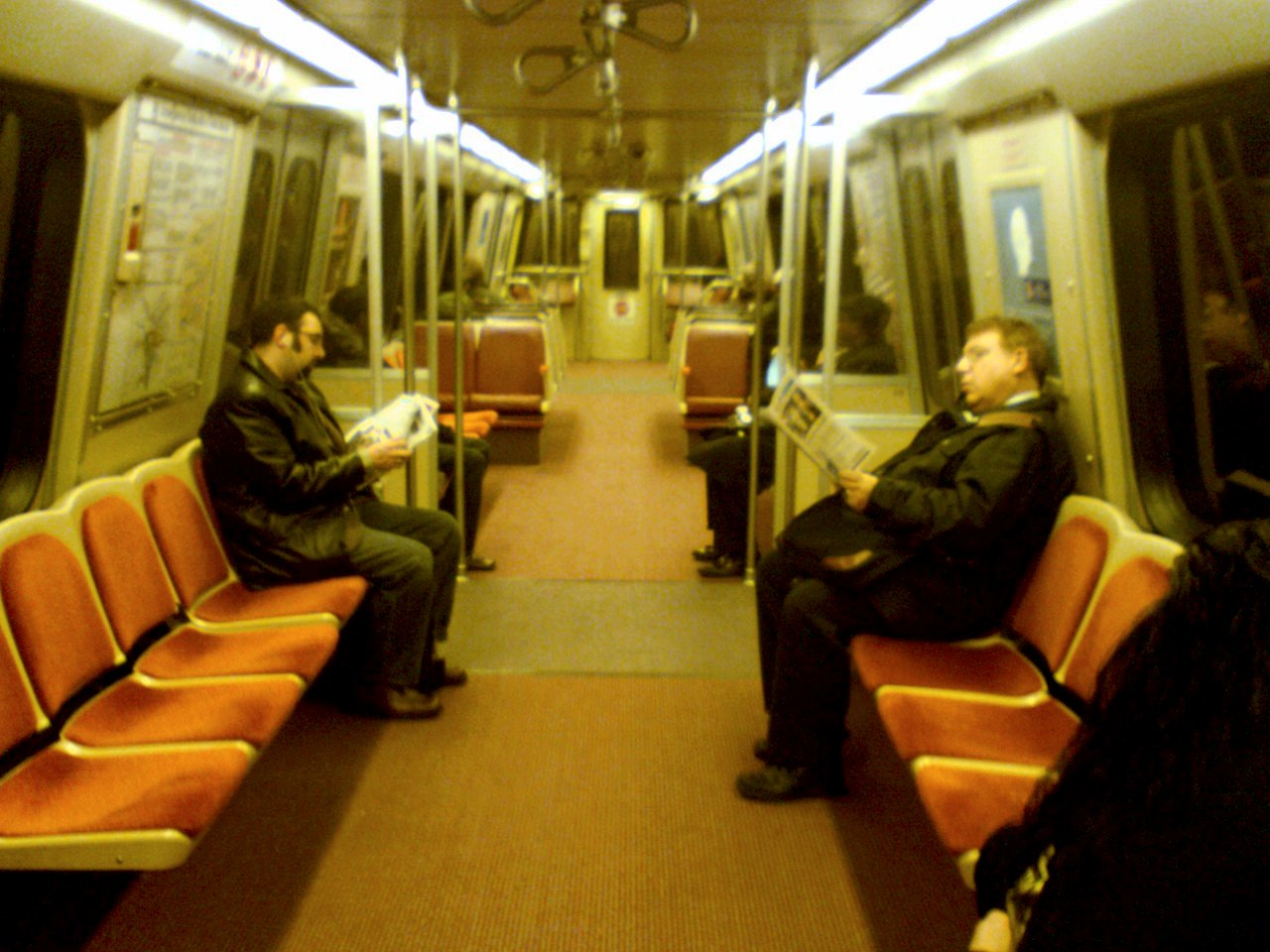
Breda 3283 with modified floor plan. Note the side-facing bench seats in the center, the strap handles along the ceiling, and the lean rests near the end of the car.

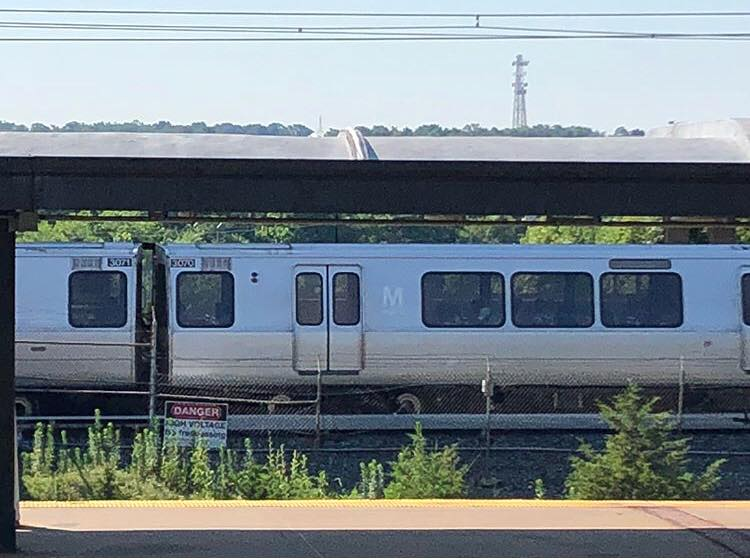
Breda 3070–3071 in vinyl wrap in June 2018 on the Orange Line servicing New Carrollton

The third order consisted of 290 cars from Breda, with delivery in 1987. These cars are numbered 3000–3289 as delivered and were rehabilitated from 2004 to 2009 by Alstom in Hornell, New York.

==== Features ====
These cars had a single flip-dot destination sign like the 2000-series cars, along with an exterior loudspeaker. As part of the rehabilitation project from 2004 to 2009, they received AC propulsion systems with IGBT technology (Alstom ONIX 2000), replacing the chopper-controlled DC propulsion system manufactured by Westinghouse. Also included in the rehabilitation was the addition of railcar monitoring systems, exterior LED destination signs, interior LED next stop signs, and improved emergency exit signage. The refurbished 3000 series cars also received the red, white and blue interior found on the 5000 series cars. Since the early 2020's, the 3000 series have had another interior upgrade, with carpeting removed and replaced with resilient floors just like the 7000 series and received a new interior that was all blue. From May to July 2026, the Breda 3000 series railcars received modified interior signage and got rid of the all-caps LED signs.

==== Pilot programs ====
Beginning in 2005, several 3000 series cars that had not yet undergone rehabilitation were modified as part of a pilot program to study passenger movements to improve the seating arrangement for future rail cars. Sixteen cars received a new seating arrangement that included modified handholds and seat positions, including some longitudinal seating. These cars, as well as other cars being used as control cars in the experiment, received on-board cameras in order for planners to observe passenger movements.

Around August 2008, Metrorail tested new overhead handles of different styles on 3034–3035 and 3094–3095, as well as some 1000 series cars to gauge public opinion.

Select 3000 series cars (3024–3025, 3062–3063, 3070–3071, 3096–3097, 3100–3101, 3104–3105, and 3118–3119) were fitted with a vinyl wrap as a pilot program in November 2017. This wrap is also found on cars 6180–6181.

==== Incidents ====
On January 6, 1996, a revenue train collided with an out-of-service train, both consisting entirely of Breda 3000-series cars, at the Shady Grove station, fatally injuring the operator of the revenue train. Car 3252, the lead car of the revenue train, collided with 3191, the car at the inbound end of the out-of-service train. The mates of these two cars, 3253 and 3190 respectively, were later mated together. 3190 reentered revenue service as 3290, and 3253 reentered service as 3291. 3252 and 3191 were retained by WMATA for training purposes at Carmen Turner Facility in Landover, Maryland until 2023 when they were replaced by railcars 6050–6051.

Cars 3036–3037 and 3256–3257 were involved in the 2009 collision, being a part of the stationary train. Despite those four cars being relatively undamaged, they did not return to service and were removed from property by 2015.

On November 29, 2009, a collision occurred between two out-of-service trains at the Falls Church rail yard in Fairfax County, Virginia. Car 3216, the lead car of one of the trains, was damaged beyond repair. Three Metro employees with minor injuries were taken to a local hospital. The NTSB planned to launch an investigation of the incident. In 2015, car 3216 was taken to the Transportation Technology Center and was later used for blast testing. Car 3217 was also believed to have been sent to the Transportation Technology Center as well.

On April 15, 2019, cars 3100 and 3114 separated while in motion near Wiehle-Reston East. There were no passengers on board since this was in the pocket track just past the station. The train was then taken to the Falls Church Rail Yard for inspection, and the sets returned to service days later.

On May 21, 2019, WMATA temporarily removed all 3000-series railcars from service following reports of door malfunctions. All 3000-Series cars returned to service days later once inspections were complete.

On October 7, 2019, at 12:54 am, two out-of-service 3000-series trains collided between Foggy Bottom and Farragut West, injuring two operators. Train 755 (the stationary train) consisted of cars 3141, 3140, 3121, 3120, 3206 and 3207, and Train 700 (the striking train) consisted of cars 3008, 3009, 3010, 3011, 3019 and 3018. Car 3008, the lead car of the striking train, struck car 3207 from the stationary train. Both cars suffered damage as a result. Cars 3140 and 3120 also suffered broken couplers during the collision as well. Cars 3008, 3009, 3120, 3121, 3206, and 3207 were damaged beyond repair and were scrapped. Cars 3140 and 3141 also never returned to service and remained on property.

On September 29, 2023, a brake disk from car 3069 fell from the car and landed on the track outside Ronald Reagan Washington National Airport station, causing a 7000-series train to derail. All 2000 and 3000 series railcars were temporarily pulled from service for inspections but returned to service by October 5, 2023.

==== Retirement ====
WMATA is expecting to begin replacing its 3000-series cars, with the last ones being phased out in early 2027. At least two cars will likely be set aside for preservation.

Beginning in 2025, at least 30 railcars were retired and stored at Greenbelt Yard. On January 8, 2026, WMATA began seeking a qualified contractor to provide pick-up, removal, and disposal services to scrap thirty 3000-series railcars beginning in early 2027. As of May 2026, 26 railcars have been shipped off-property.

=== Alstom 6000-series ===
Washington Metro 6000-series
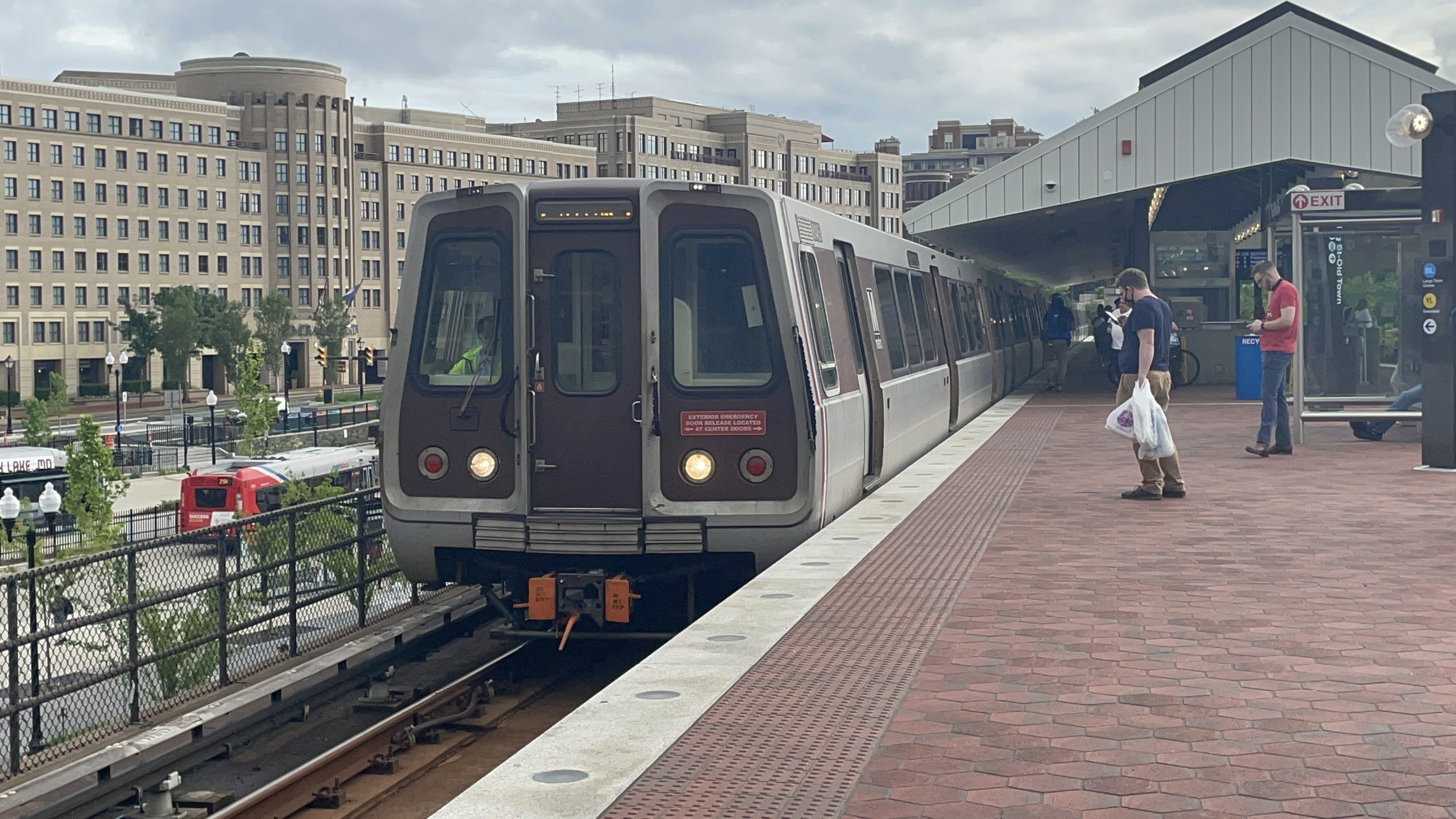
- Alstom Consists on the Yellow Line arriving at King Street–Old Town in May 2022

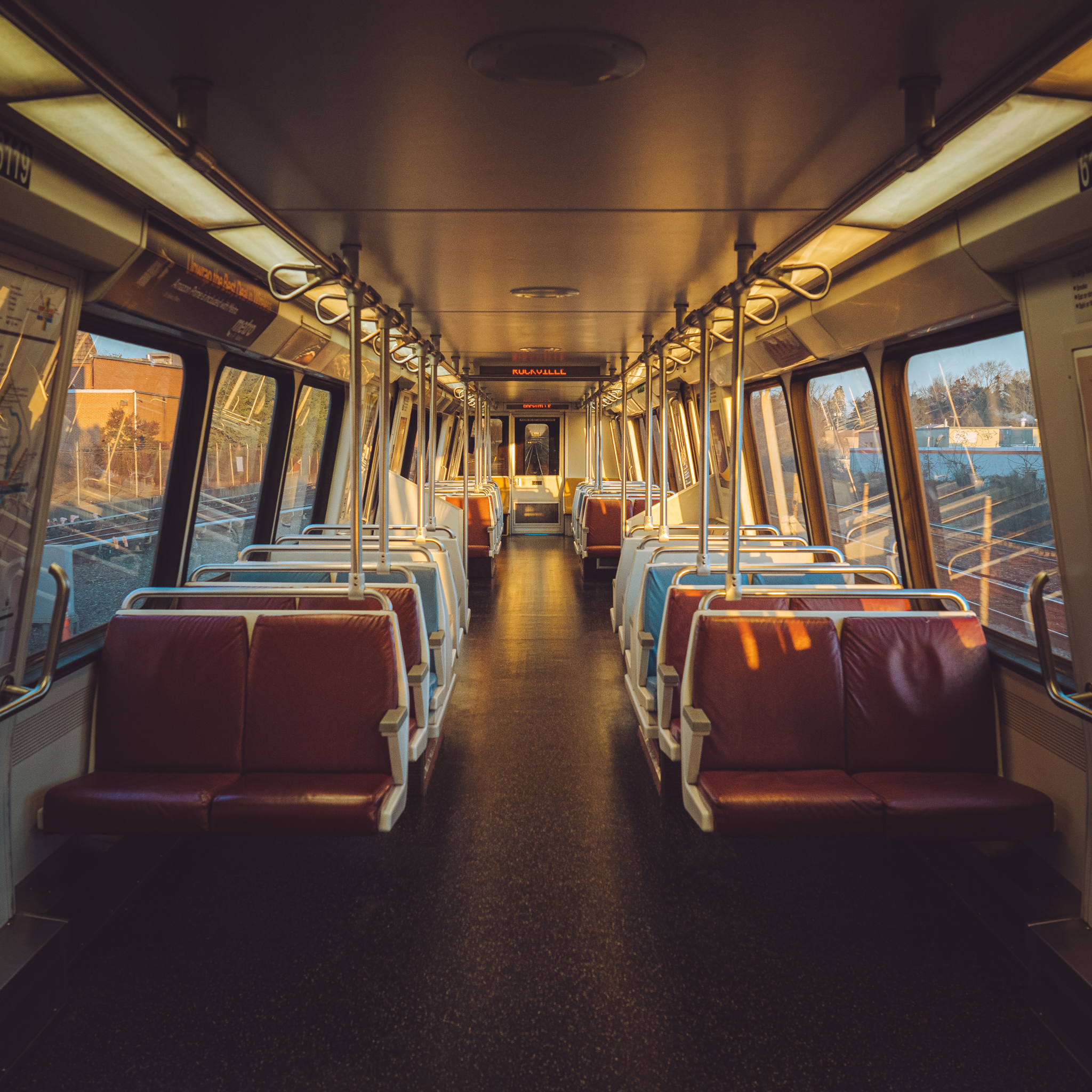
- Interior of Alstom 6119 on the Red Line departing Twinbrook in December 2019
- In service: 2006–present
- Manufacturer: Alstom Transportation
- Built at: Barcelona, Spain and Hornell, New York, U.S.
- Constructed: 2005–2007
- Entered service: October 3, 2006
- Scrapped: TBA
- Number built: 184
- Number in service: 180; (2 in work service)
- Formation: 2 cars per trainset
- Fleet numbers: 6000–6183
- Capacity: Seating: 64; Total: 175
- Operator: WMATA

Specifications
- Car body construction: Extruded aluminum
- Train length: 600 ft (182.88 m) (8-car train)
- Car length: 75 ft (22.86 m)
- Width: 10 ft 1 3/4 in (3.09 m)
- Height: 10 ft 10 in (3.30 m)
- Floor height: 40 in (1,016 mm)
- Doors: Sliding, 6 per car
- Maximum speed: 75 mph (121 km/h)
- Weight: 79,000 lb (36,000 kg)
- Traction system: Alstom ONIX 2000 2-level IGBT–VVVF
- Traction motors: 4 × Alstom 4 EXA 2122 165 kW (221 hp) 3-phase AC induction motor
- Power output: 1,320 kW (1,770 hp)
- Acceleration: 2.8 mph/s (4.5 km/(h⋅s))
- Electric system: 750 V DC (nominal) from third rail
- Current collection: Contact shoe
- UIC classification: Bo′Bo′+Bo′Bo′
- AAR wheel arrangement: B-B+B-B
- Bogies: Cast steel
- Coupling system: Tomlinson
- Track gauge: 4 ft 8 1/4 in (1,429 mm)

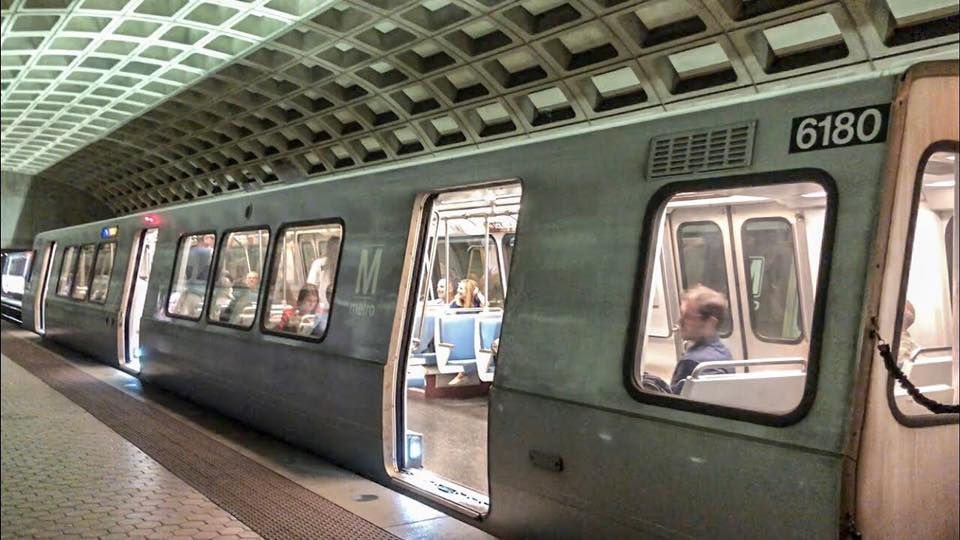
WMATA Alstom 6180 in the vinyl wrap on the Blue Line at Pentagon City in July 2018

The sixth order of metro railcars consisted of 184 cars, built by Alstom, the same company involved in the 2000 and 3000 Series rehabilitation program, with assembly being completed at Hornell, New York.

==== Features ====
The bulkhead doors have rounded windows and a different operator side window design without a top horizontal bar. The 6000-series cars seat 64, 4 fewer than the cars built since the 2000-series.

The interior was redesigned to allow for additional standing room (mostly around the center doors) and easier access to all portions of the car. New to the 6000-series cars is the addition of two interior LED next stop indicators located at the center of the car, which brings the total to four interior displays per car (two facing each direction). There also is an intercom located next to the center doors; previous rail cars only have them at the front and back of each car. From May to July 2026, the Alstom 6000 series railcars received modified interior signage and got rid of the all-caps LED signs.

Another new feature is that they are the first series of cars manufactured with the flashing brake indicators on the far ends of each car. These are similar to what was used on the Rohr cars, and the current rehabilitated Bredas, indicating when the train is in the final stages of stopping. The 6000-series cars features the same cast trucks as the CAF cars, and use the same propulsion systems and advanced cab signaling systems found in the Breda 2000/3000-series after rehabilitation by Alstom.

The body shells of the 6000-series were built in Barcelona, Spain, with assembly completed in Hornell, New York.

==== Delivery ====
The first 6000-series set was placed into service on Tuesday, October 3, 2006, at 11:30 am on its inaugural trip on the Green Line from Greenbelt to Branch Avenue.

On November 17, 2008, Metro completed the installation of new stainless steel-grab bars to all 184 6000-series cars.

==== Pilot programs ====
In late 2007, Metro began testing new resilient flooring on four 6000-series cars (6104–6105 and 6142–6143) and announced in November 2013 that within two years, all 6000-series cars would feature the new flooring.

Metro tested new fabric seating on cars 6026–6027. This type of seating was also installed on cars 6014–6015.

In November 2017, cars 6180–6181 were fitted with a silver vinyl wrap, which replaces the brown painting on the sides of the cars. On the inside, new blue seats were installed to match the new 7000-series cars. A dozen 6000-series and 3000-series cars received these features. WMATA says repainting would cost $14,055 per car, while implementing a vinyl wrap costs only $4,776. Metro's Richard Jordan also claims this method is more environmentally friendly compared to painting. The aluminum surface requires harsh chemicals which have to be treated before being put down the sewer.

==== Incidents ====
6050–6051 suffered major body damage in a derailment at the New Carrollton Yard in January 2013. 6050 was sent to Upstate New York to be repaired at the Alstom Plant. 6051 was stored at Greenbelt Yard. By October 2021, 6050 was re-coupled back with 6051. However they were not returned to service and instead they are being used for training purposes at WMATA's Carmen Turner Facility in Landover, MD, replacing cars 3191 and 3252 in 2023.

6038–6039 separated from each other while operating on the Silver Line between McLean and East Falls Church on August 25, 2018. The set was repaired and returned to service in late 2018.

On November 24, 2020, all 6000-series railcars were removed from service following two train-separation incidents on the Red Line in one month. The first incident happened on October 9, 2020, when cars 6075 and 6079 separated from each other between NoMa and Union station, causing service to be suspended between Gallery Place and Rhode Island Avenue stations. The second incident happened on November 24, 2020, when cars 6150 and 6177 pulled apart from each other while departing Glenmont, causing rail service to be suspended between Glenmont and Forest Glen stations. Both incidents caused no injuries and both were caused by the incorrect tools installed on the couplers. On May 18, 2021, WMATA announced that all 6000 series would remain sidelined indefinitely. After months of postponing largely due to global supply chain shortages caused by the COVID-19 pandemic, the cars gradually returned to service starting on September 23, 2021 with all railcars returning to service by 2022.

==== Other uses ====
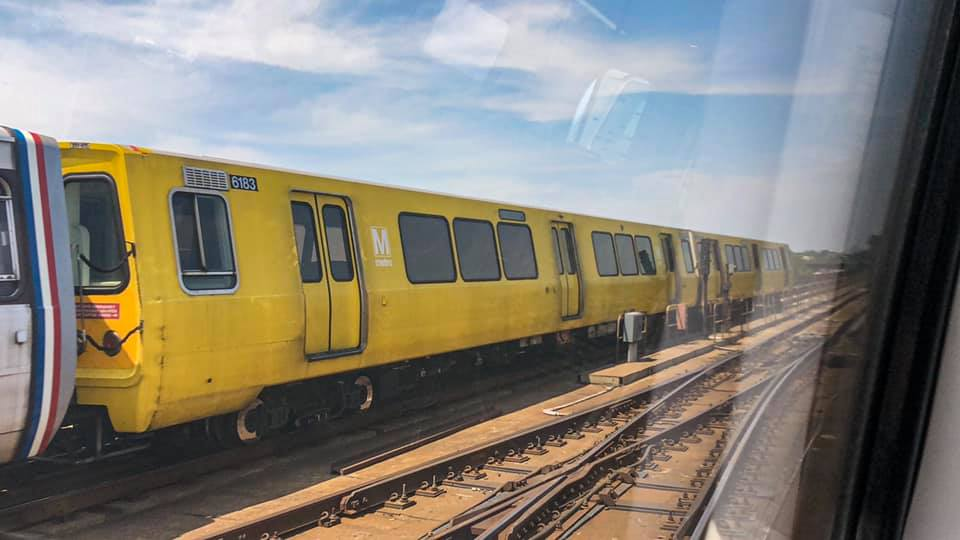
Alstom 6182–6183 in the Yellow Vinyl Wrap to serve for the Money Train in May 2019

In May 2019, 6182–6183 were removed from passenger service and now serve as "money train" cars in a yellow vinyl wrap. These cars replaced cars 8000–8001 (formerly 1010–1011), one of three 1000-series pairs that originally served on the money train. Since late 2023, the yellow vinyl wrap was removed and was repainted into an all silver design.

=== Kawasaki 7000-series ===
Washington Metro 7000-series
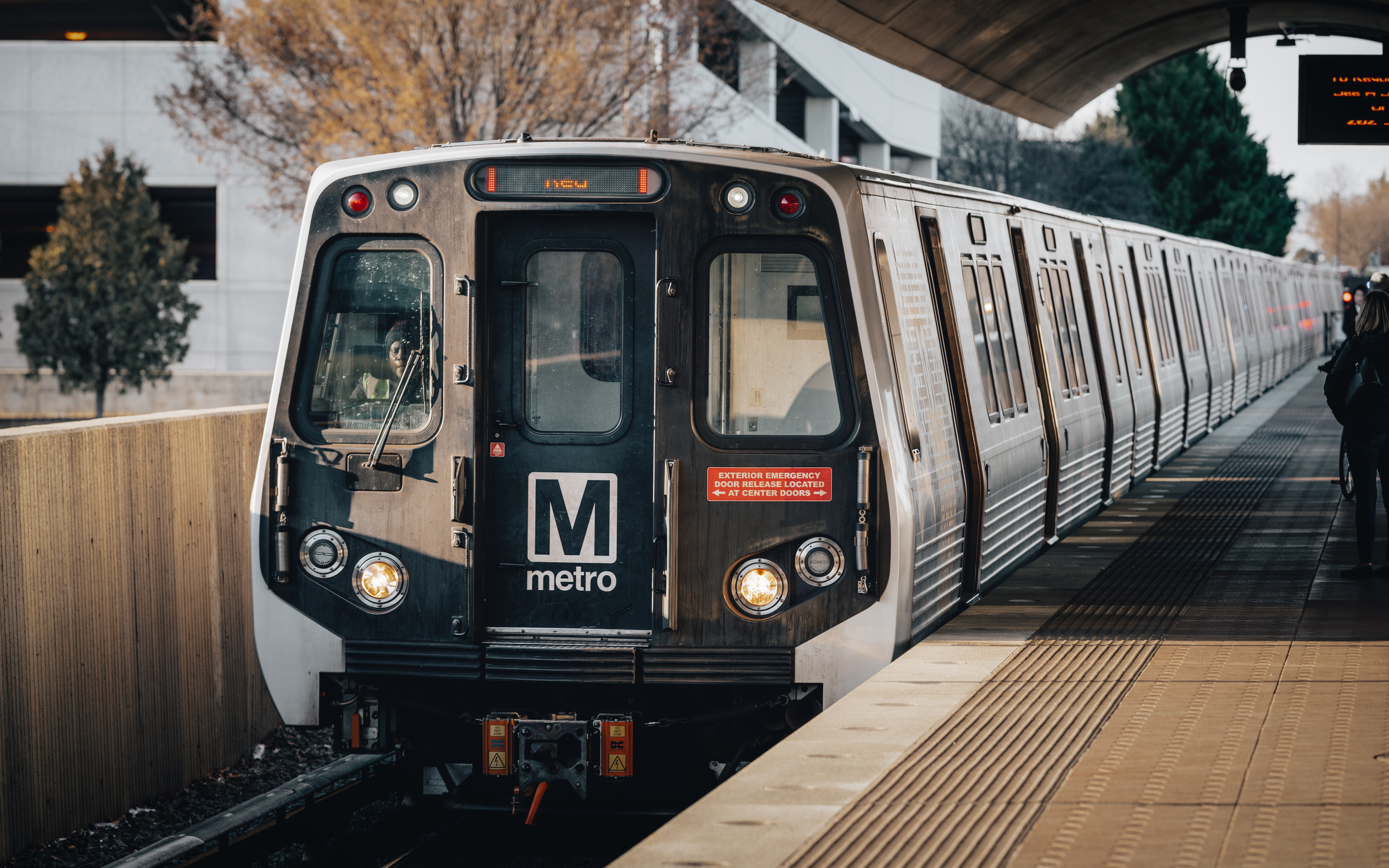
- 7000-series railcars on the Red Line arriving at Twinbrook in January 2023

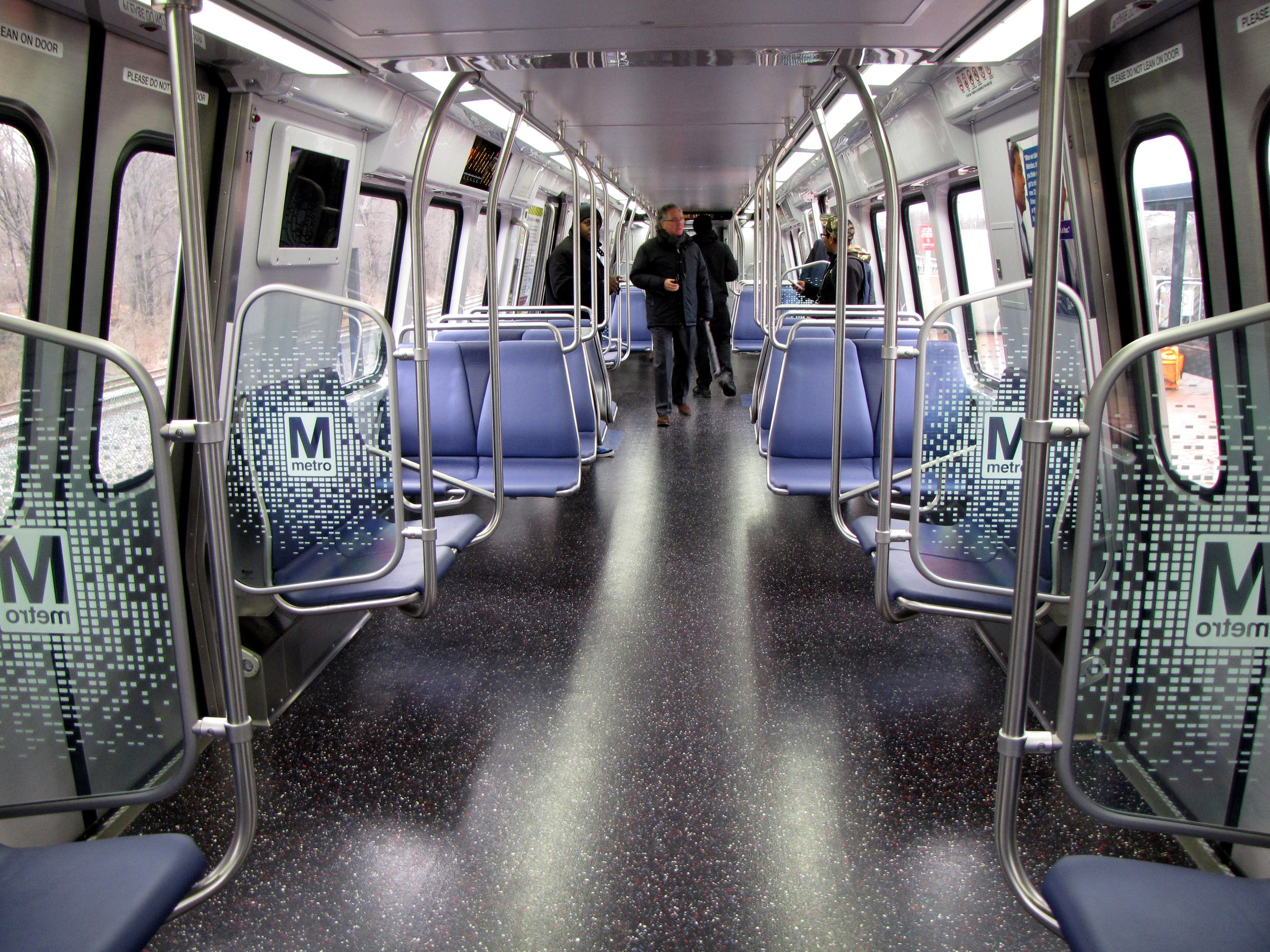
- WMATA 7000-series interior at the Greenbelt platform in January 2014
- In service: 2015–present
- Manufacturer: Kawasaki Rail Car Company
- Built at: Kawasaki Rail Car, Yonkers, New York, Lincoln, Nebraska, and Kobe, Japan
- Replaced: 1000-series, 2000-series, 4000-series, 5000-series
- Constructed: 2012–2020
- Entered service: April 14, 2015
- Number built: 748
- Number in service: 748
- Formation: 2 cars (A-B) per trainset
- Fleet numbers: 7000–7747
- Capacity: Seating: A-Car: 64 B-Car: 68; Total: 132
- Operator: WMATA

Specifications
- Car body construction: Stainless steel
- Train length: 600 ft (182.88 m) (8-car train)
- Car length: 75 ft (22.86 m)
- Width: 10 ft 1 3/4 in (3.09 m)
- Height: 10 ft 10 in (3.30 m)
- Floor height: 40 in (1,016 mm)
- Doors: Sliding, 6 per car
- Maximum speed: 75 mph (121 km/h)
- Weight: 84,289 lb (38,233 kg)
- Traction system: Toshiba 2-level IGBT–VVVF
- Traction motors: 4 × Toshiba SEA-430 140 kW (190 hp) 3-phase AC induction motor
- Power output: 1,120 kW (1,500 hp)
- Acceleration: 2.8 mph/s (4.5 km/(h⋅s))
- Electric system: 750 V DC (nominal) from third rail
- Current collection: Contact shoe
- UIC classification: Bo′Bo′+Bo′Bo′
- AAR wheel arrangement: B-B+B-B
- Bogies: Fabricated steel
- Coupling system: Tomlinson/Dellner
- Track gauge: 4 ft 8 1/4 in (1,429 mm)

In April 2013, WMATA moved forward with plans to order 528 railcars from Kawasaki, called the 7000-series, to replace the 1000-series cars and to provide service for the Dulles Corridor Metrorail Project, otherwise known as the Silver Line.

==== Features ====
In a February 8, 2007, press release, Metro stated that the new 7000-series cars would have a similar appearance to the 6000-series cars manufactured by Alstom. However, in a January 2008 press release, Metro indicated that the design for the 7000-series cars would have a completely different appearance from that of the current rail cars. The exterior would feature a stainless steel body rather than the aluminum of earlier designs. Inside, seats would be taller and more ergonomically designed, carpeting would be replaced with a resilient floor covering, the grab bars along the ceiling would contain spring-loaded handles, and the cars would contain security cameras, automated announcements, as well as FIN (flexible information and notice) and LC (liquid-crystal) displays to provide the next stop information.

Like previous cars, 7000-series cars are configured as semi-permanently coupled married pairs. However, unlike previous cars, the 7000-series cars do not have an operator's cab in every car: even-numbered "A" cars have operator's cabs, while odd-numbered "B" cars do not. The "B" cars can be operated as necessary using smaller hostler controls instead. The married pairs are composed of one of each type. This arrangement favors four- and eight-car trains in A–B–B–A and A–B–B–A–A–B–B–A configurations, but six-car trains in A–B–B–A–B–A and trains in any configuration are also in use. The following diagram depicts an eight-car train, with couplers represented by crosses and semi-permanent link bars represented by dashes.

==== History ====
The 7000-series cars are incompatible with the existing fleet. Presented with that issue, Metro's board members recognized the seriousness of the decision, but former Metro general manager John B. Catoe indicated that the board needed to decide "in months" on whether to go ahead with the rail car order, regardless of whether or not the Dulles extension was approved.

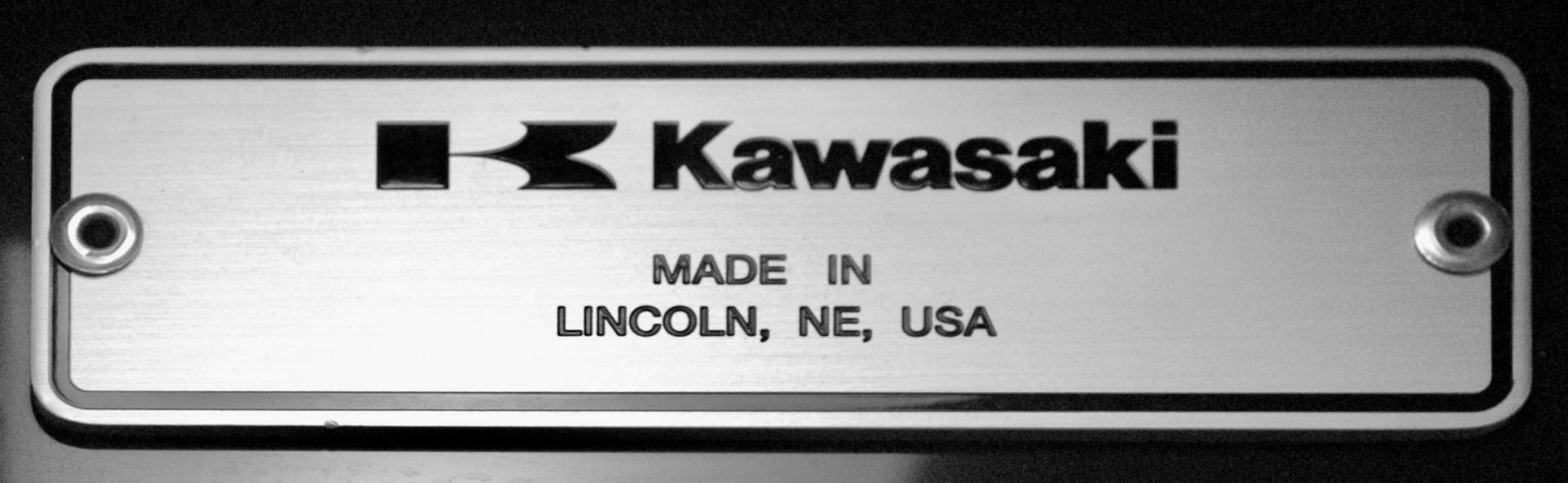
Builder's plate of a 7000 series train.

The bidding process began in December 2008. WMATA issued a notice to proceed to Kawasaki on July 27, 2010, after receiving funding from the Federal Transit Administration, although delivery was delayed due to issues with suppliers following the 2011 Tōhoku earthquake and tsunami.

Under the contract, Metro originally agreed to purchase 428 7000-series railcars, both to replace its 1000-series cars and provide service for the new Silver Line. In April 2013, Metro elected to exercise an option in the contract to purchase an additional one hundred cars to replace its one hundred 4000-series cars, which it decided did not warrant being overhauled in light of chronic mechanical issues. In September 2013, Metro announced it exercised another option under the contract to purchase an additional 220 railcars, bringing the total order to 748 railcars. In total, the new 7000-series railcars currently make up more than half of Metro's rolling stock as of 2020. In November 2013, it was reported that the first four cars would arrive before the end of 2013 and that they would then be tested for 30 weeks, allowing Metro to troubleshoot any issues before full production begins.

Metro unveiled the first 7000-series quad set at Greenbelt on January 6, 2014. The set underwent acceptance testing for at least eight months in order to finalize design specs and work out any problems. In September 2014, Metro reported that it was about one month away from finishing tests on the 7000-series test train, and it stated that it expected an eight-car train made up of 7000-series cars would start carrying passengers in early 2015, and Metro would have 56 railcars by June 2015. During that time, Metro revealed that during testing, a software issue was discovered that it was still addressing, although Metro was confident that the hardware itself was solid. Metro had indicated that the mass production schedule called for 56 new cars to be delivered by June 2015. Combined with the eight cars in the test group, that would give Metro 64 new cars, meaning eight 7000-series trains of eight cars each would be in service the next summer. After that, 300 more cars would arrive by February 2017, followed by an additional 100, for a total of 528 new cars at an overall cost of $1.46 billion.

Metro warned its funding partners – VA, MD and DC – that its option to purchase an additional 220 7000-series cars expired in June 2015 and required a funding commitment of $614 million for rolling stock, and $856 million for related infrastructure upgrades. Subsequently, in June 2015, the Federal Transit Administration cleared a major obstacle that was preventing Metro from purchasing the additional 220 railcars by approving an early retirement for the 192 5000-series railcars in order to avoid expenses and to upgrade rail service. Metro's funding partners, VA, MD and DC, agreed to fund the additional purchase of 220 7000-series cars, bringing the total purchase up to 748 railcars.

The first 7000-series train debuted on the Blue Line on April 14, 2015. 7000-series trains subsequently entered service on the Red line on June 8, 2015, the Orange Line in July, and the Green and Yellow Lines on August 17, 2015. On March 8, 2018, WMATA accepted delivery of its 500th 7000-series car. On February 26, 2020, WMATA accepted delivery of the final 7000-series railcars (7746–7747), completing the order.

Beginning in January 2024, four 7000-series trains began operating as six-car trains on the Silver Line as a trial to operate more cost efficiently and to retire the 2000-series. After the trial, WMATA began implementing six-car 7000-series trains systemwide in March 2024.

==== Safety issues ====
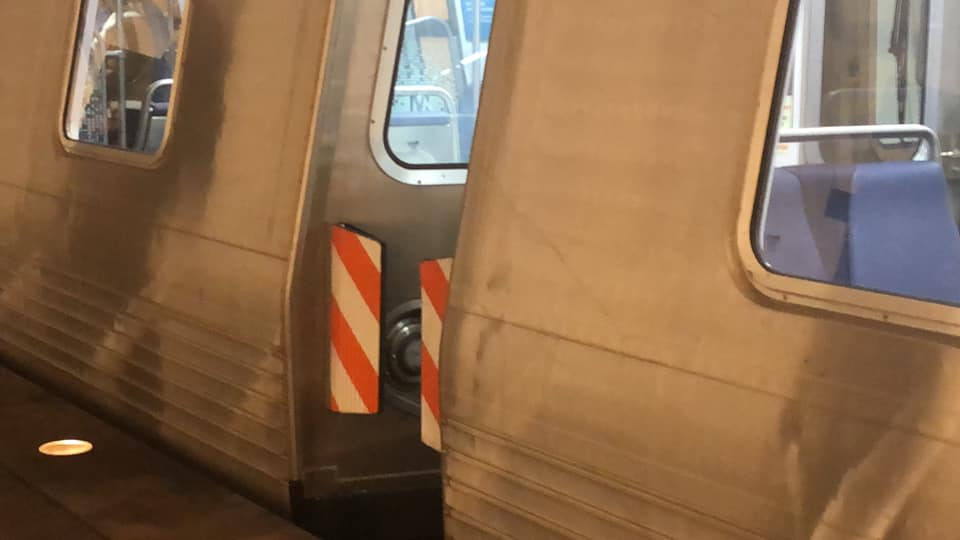
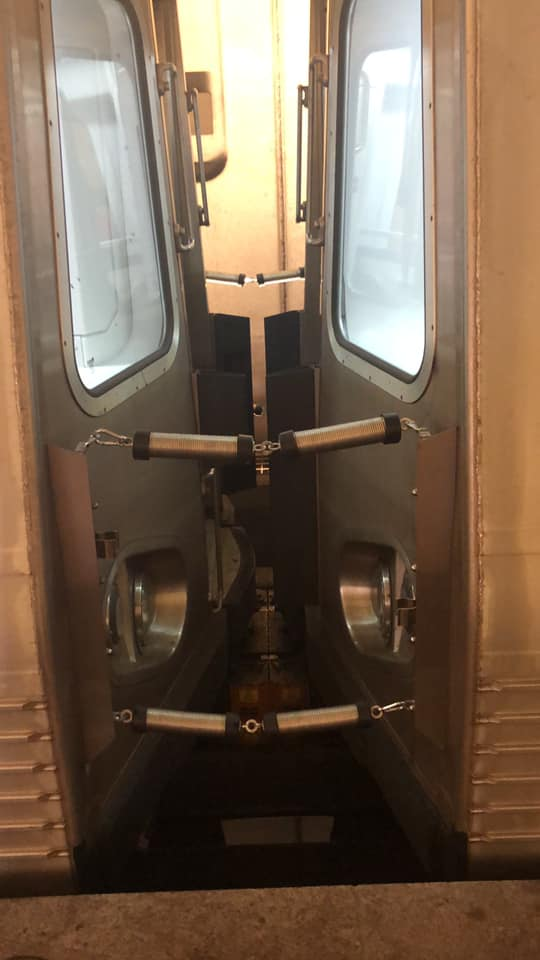
The 7000-series cars were delivered with "Rubber Barriers". These barriers posed safety risks for the blind, necessitating their replacement with "Chain Barriers".

In June 2016, the 7000-series was taken out of service on the Blue, Orange, and Silver Lines after Metro discovered that trains could lose contact with the third rail on a steep curve, which caused the train to shut down outside Rosslyn.

On December 12, 2016, a Shady Grove-bound Red Line train separated with passengers on board when leaving Twinbrook, railcars 7135 and 7219 being the cars to pull apart. No one was hurt in the incident and the train was taken to the nearby Shady Grove Rail Yard for further review before re-entering service.

On December 31, 2016, a Washington Post article reported that some residents in DC's Petworth neighborhood were noticing increased noise and vibration levels attributed to the heavier, steel-bodied 7000-series trains. According to the article, Metro engineers conducted initial field tests and noted only "negligible vibration levels." Metro spokesman Richard L. Jordan stated: "Metro is in the process of bringing in third-party engineers to conduct additional tests before we make a final determination." A March 3, 2017, report from WAMU noted that some residents in North Michigan Park and Southwest Waterfront were also experiencing increased noise and vibrations since the 7000-series trains entered service on the Green Line. The same WAMU report stated that Metro has hired the California-based company Wilson Ihrig to conduct "field testing in selected homes."

In August 2018, The Washington Post reported that all delivered cars came with defective wiring that had to be replaced. In addition, WMATA began playing the announcement "This is a 7000-series train" whenever the train doors opened. This was intended as a temporary measure to aid the disabled because the types of barriers that separated the 7000-series cars posed safety risks for the blind. The FTA ordered WMATA to fix the barriers before the end of 2018, but WMATA could not meet that deadline. However, the barriers began appearing on 7000-series railcars in October 2018. In late June 2019, WMATA announced that all 7000-series railcars were fitted with the new safety chains and phased out the "This is a 7000-series train" announcement.

On October 17, 2021, WMATA announced they would temporarily remove all 7000-series railcars on October 18, 2021, due to potential defects on their axles. This was due to a 7000 series derailing on the Blue Line on October 12, 2021, after one axle of the derailed train was found to be out of compliance with the specification of the wheel assembly. The result of the cars being pulled caused severe service reduction on all Metro lines. During the inspections, it was revealed that 20 axles were out of alignment. In December 2021, Metro presented early plans at a board meeting for gradual reintegration of the unaffected 7000-series railcars, pending NTSB approval. Also in December, four U.S. senators wrote to Metro requesting full details of actions taken regarding the wheel alignment issues and the cost incurred.

On December 14, 2021, WMATA announced they would return at most, 336 7000-series railcars back into service. They would then pause for 90 days without further release of additional cars until all aspects of the new inspection cycles are fully established and any needed adjustments are made under the Washington Metrorail Safety Commission oversight. Two 8-car 7000-series trains then re-entered service (one on the Blue line and one on the Silver) on December 17, 2021. About 72 railcars returned to service before WMATA announced on December 23, 2021, they would suspend returning additional 7000-series railcars to service and inspect them daily. The cars that already returned to service remained so until December 29, 2021, when WMATA discovered an issue in at least five of the returned railcars.

On January 12, 2022, WMATA announced 7000-series trains would remain out of passenger service for about 90 days (estimated April 2022) to allow engineering and mechanical experts time to focus on the root cause of the derailment and acquire new technology to measure 7000-series wheelsets. On March 24, 2022, WMATA CEO Paul Wiedefeld announced 7000-series trains would remain out of passenger service again until summer 2022. However, WMATA announced a new safety plan to have the 7000-series railcars inspected daily. Metro installed the first of the automated inspection devices in May, and reaffirmed that the 7000-series would return to service in summer 2022. On May 24, 2022, WMATA announced they would be putting eight 7000-series trains in service in the following weeks. A plan to return the 7000-series was announced on May 19, 2022 to be conducted in three phases. On June 15, 2022, WMATA announced they would return eight 7000-series train sets beginning on June 16, 2022, resulting in 64 active railcars, which would be in the 7500-7747 range.

On September 2, 2022, WMATA announced they would return at least 20 7000-series trains back into service after updating its return-to-service plan over the summer. By then, more 7000-series in the 7000-7499 range began returning to service with most slowly being reactivated. By October 2022, WMATA began Phase 2 of the plan where cars will be qualified for service every four days and there would be no limit on which railcars can be in service. In January 2023, WMATA announced they were cleared to begin Phase 3 of its Return to Service plan where cars will be inspected every week instead of every four days. Rail service would return to normal by February 2023. In March 2023, WMATA announced they will fix all axles on all 7000-series railcars over the next three years.

== Future ==
=== Hitachi 8000-series ===
Washington Metro 8000-series
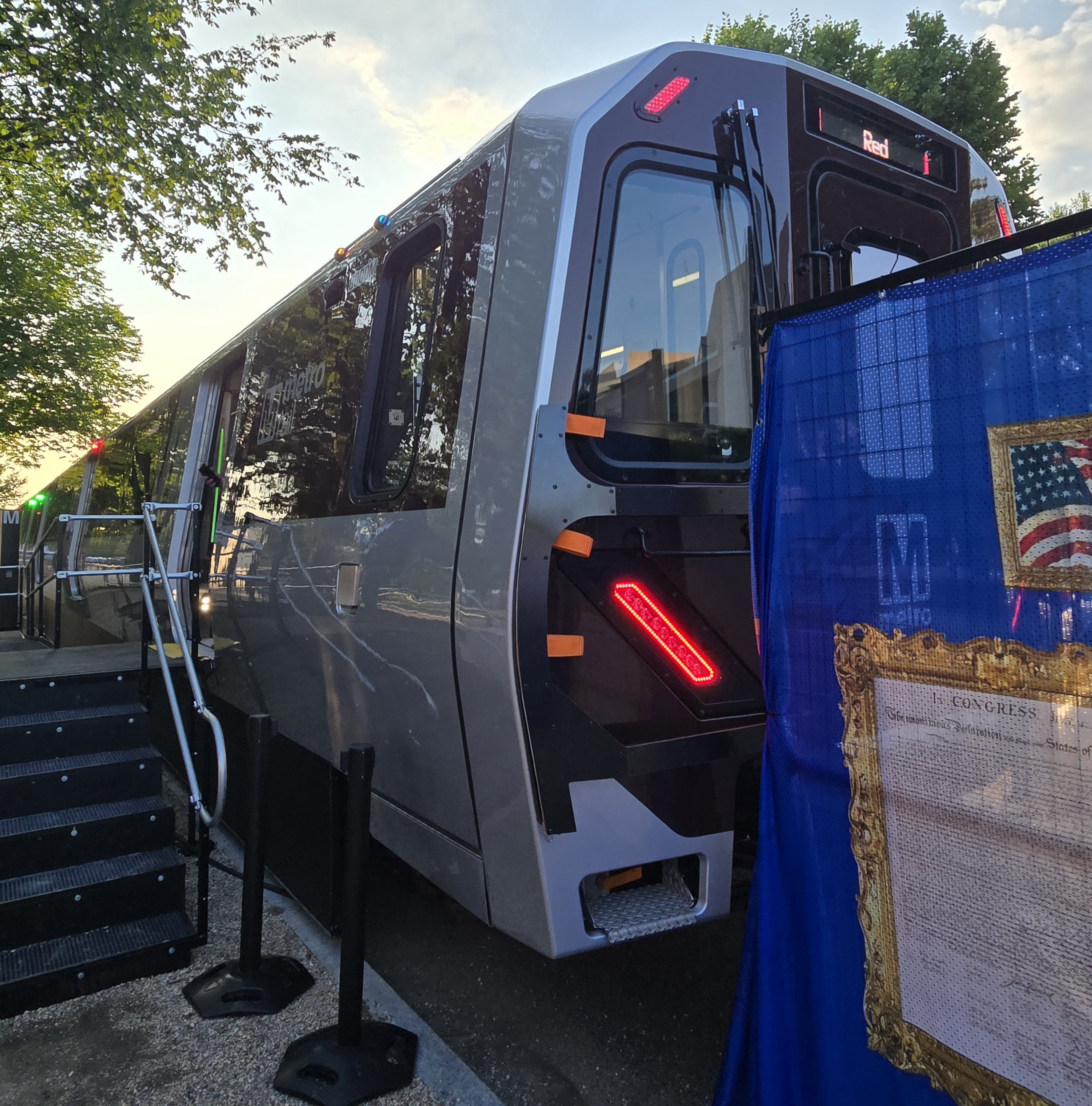
- Full scale mock up at National Mall, June 29, 2026

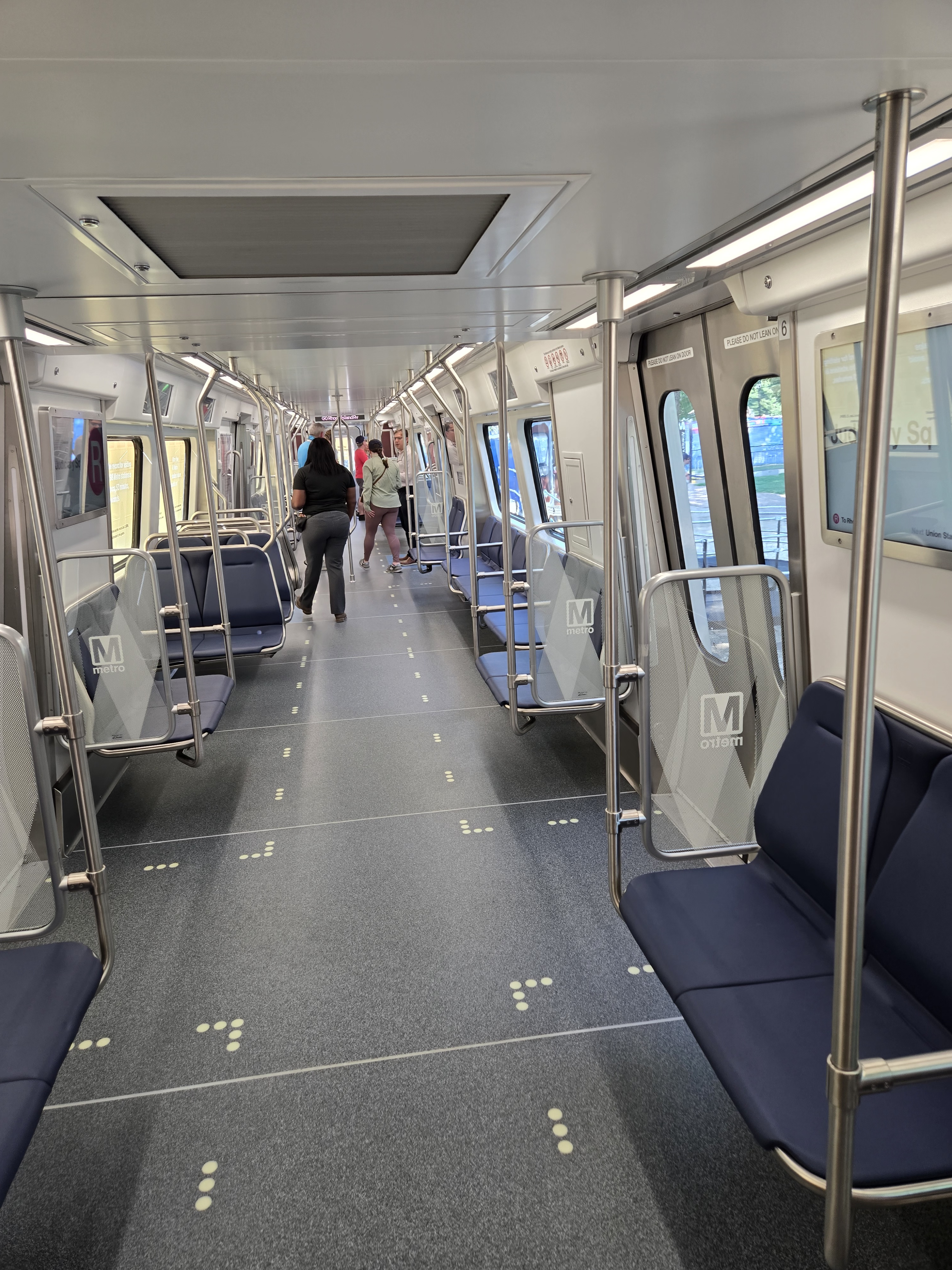
- The interior of the full scale mock up
- Manufacturer: Hitachi Rail
- Order no.: 256-800
- Built at: Hagerstown, Maryland
- Constructed: 2027–2028 (expected)
- Entered service: 2028 (expected)
- Formation: 2 cars (A-B) per trainset
- Operator: WMATA

Specifications
- Car body construction: Aluminum
- Train length: 600 ft (182.88 m) (8-car train)
- Car length: 75 ft (22.86 m)
- Width: 10 ft 1 3/4 in (3.09 m)
- Height: 10 ft 10 in (3.30 m)
- Floor height: 40 in (1,016 mm)
- Doors: Sliding, 6 per car
- Maximum speed: 75 mph (121 km/h)
- Electric system: 750 V DC (nominal) from third rail
- Current collection: Contact shoe
- Coupling system: Tomlinson
- Track gauge: 4 ft 8 1/4 in (1,429 mm)

Following the replacement of the 1000, 2000, 4000 and 5000-series cars with the new 7000-series between 2016 and 2024, Metro proposed that all remaining 3000-series cars be replaced by the 8000-series cars. Metro considered using an open gangway married pair- or quad-configuration design concept for the 8000-series railcars, but initially decided against advancing those designs, making them similar in appearance to the 7000-series. In February 2023, WMATA decided to re-evaluate the open gangway design for potential improvements in accessibility and capacity. In April 2023, WMATA released concept renderings that show an open gangway between two cars and longitudinal seating on one side with designated spaces for strollers, luggage, and bikes.

Early plans for the 8000-series procurement had delivery of the cars to begin in 2023. In September 2018, Metro issued a request for proposals from manufacturers for 256 railcars with options for a total of up to 800. The agency originally planned to award the contract in 2019 and receive the first railcars in 2024. On October 6, 2020, Metro selected Hitachi Rail to construct the new railcars. The first order would replace the 3000-series equipment, while the options, if selected, would allow the agency to increase capacity and retire the 6000-series.

The new 8000-series railcars will be built at a factory in Hagerstown, Maryland. In October 2022, Hitachi released its final design of the railcar manufacturing plant and test track. They are expected to enter service by late 2027.

In August 2025, after a public vote, WMATA announced the new livery design for the 8000-series, featuring a departure from the silver design from the 7000-series and a return to the brown scheme from previous trainsets, as well as a large M next to the doors.

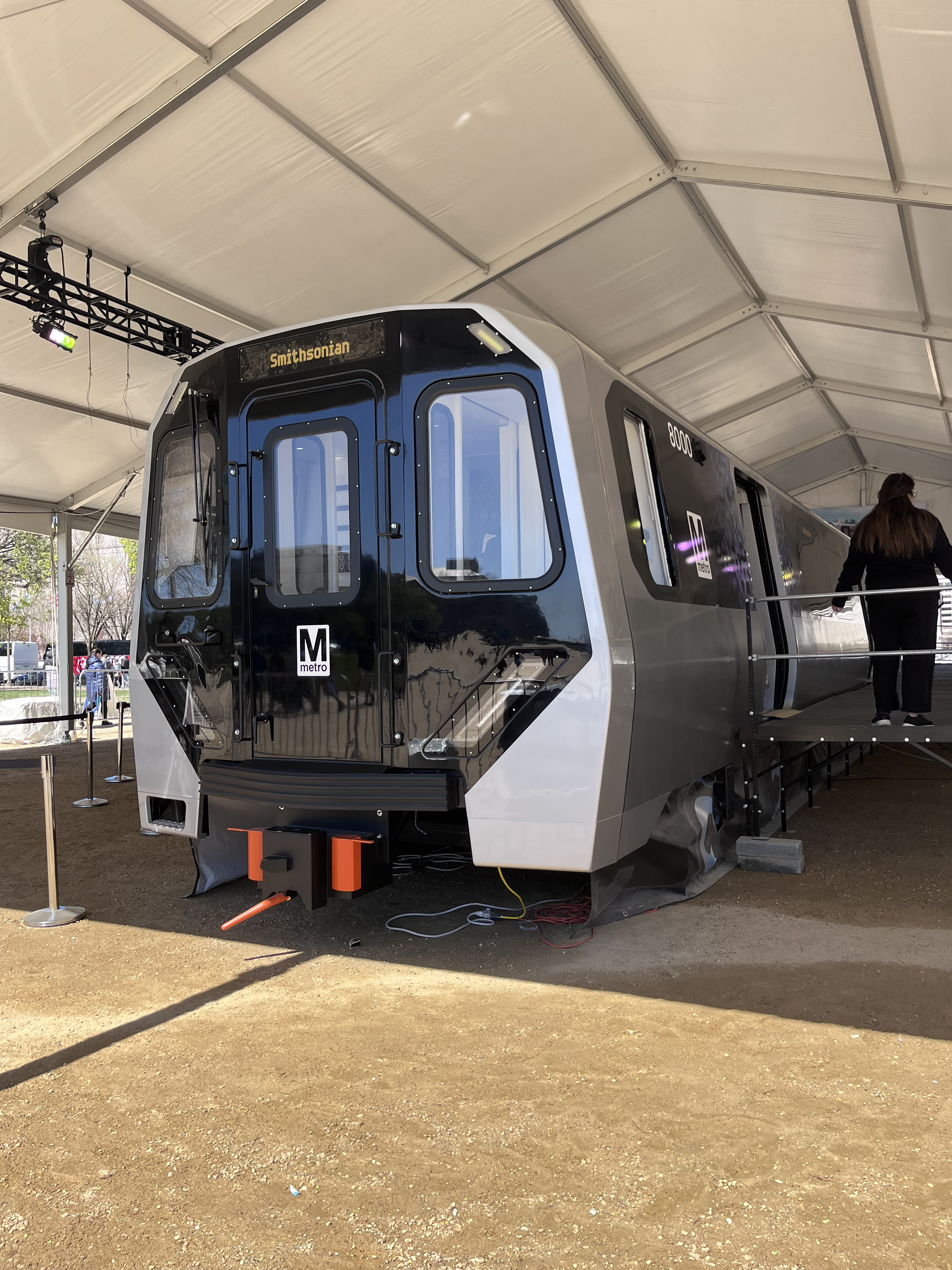
Mock-up of the earlier rendition of the front exterior, March 2024

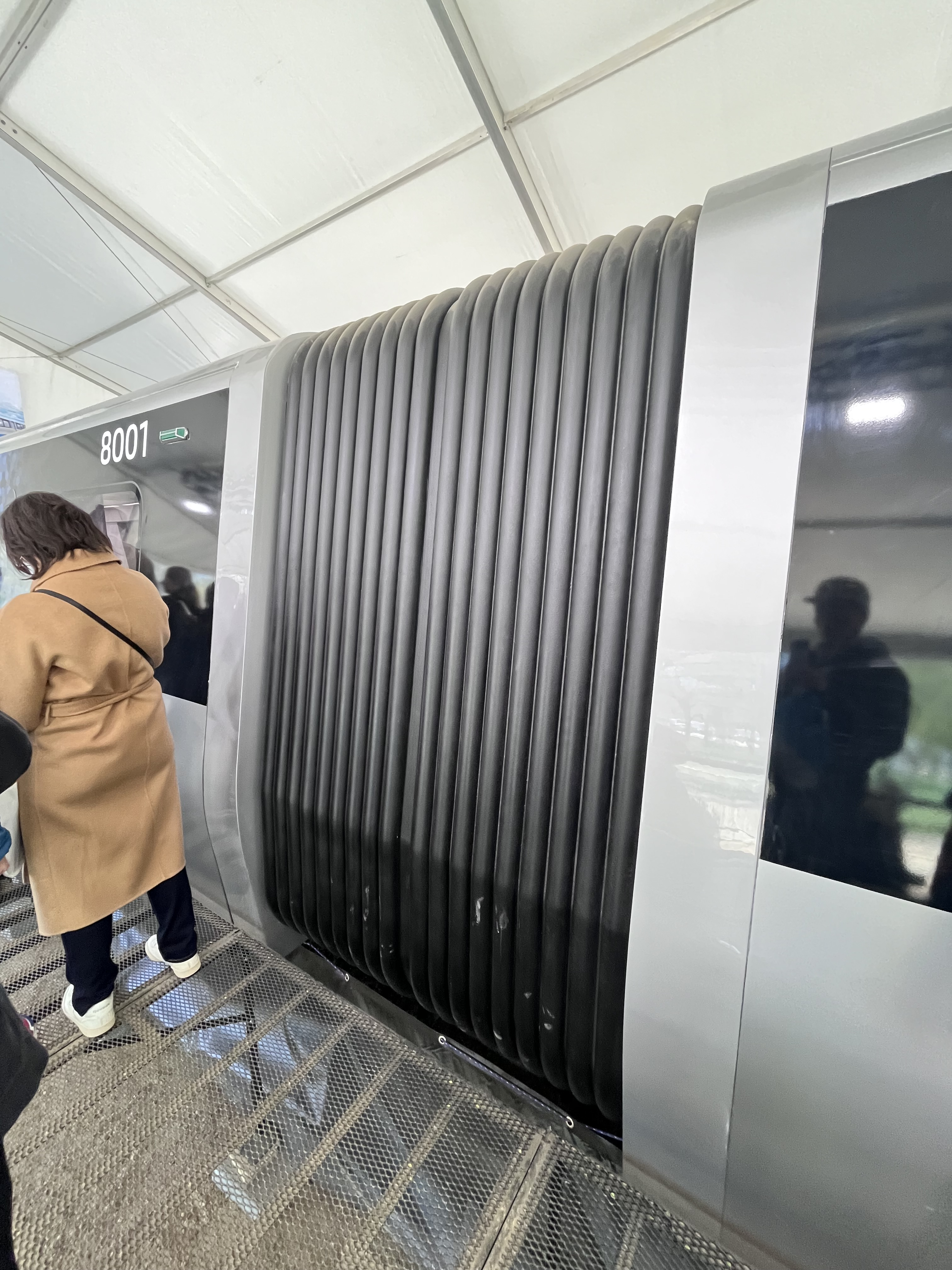
Exterior of the open gangway, March 2024

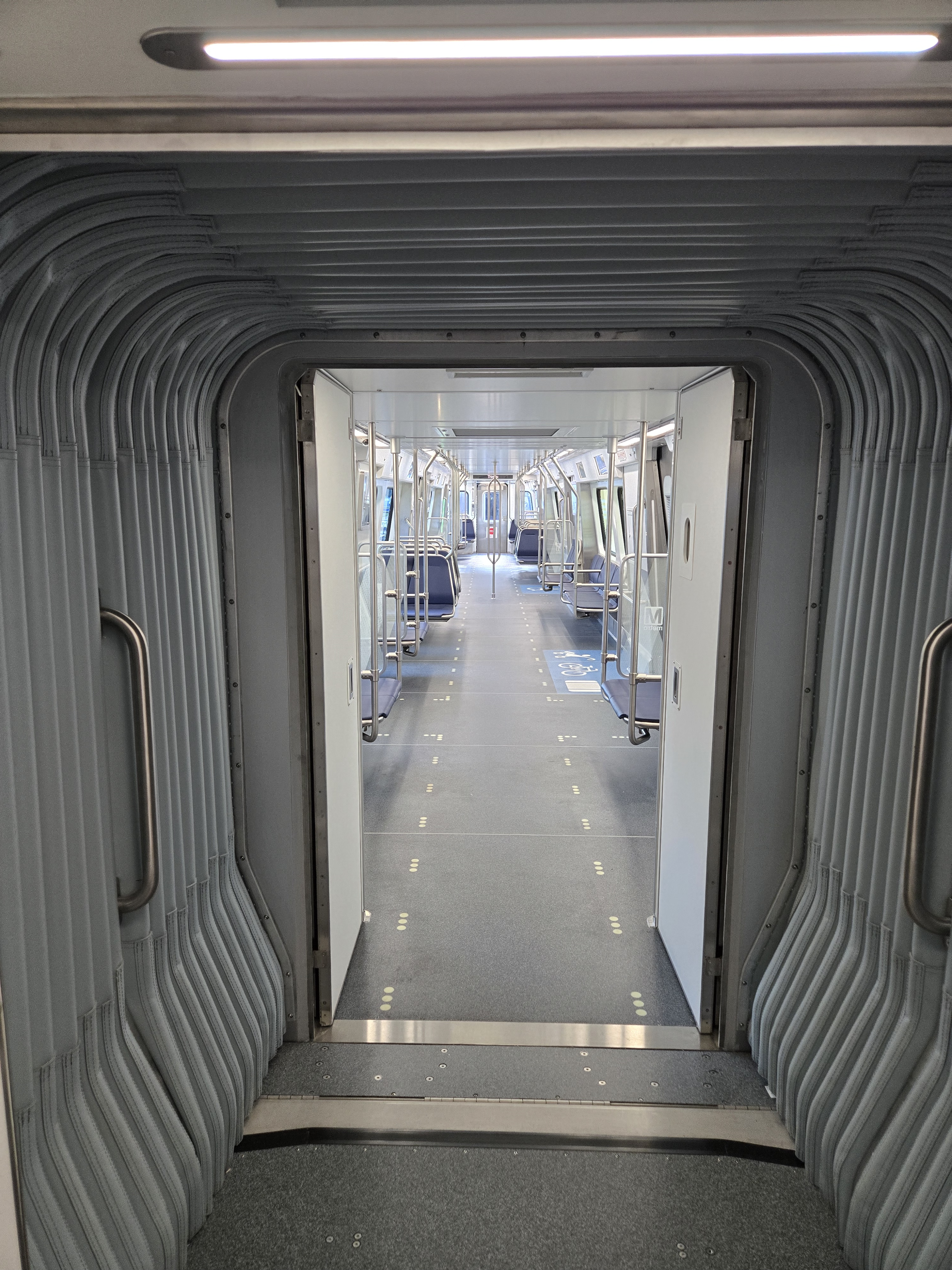
The open gangway between the full scale A and B cars as well as the open space visible for luggage, wheelchairs, or strollers in the foreground

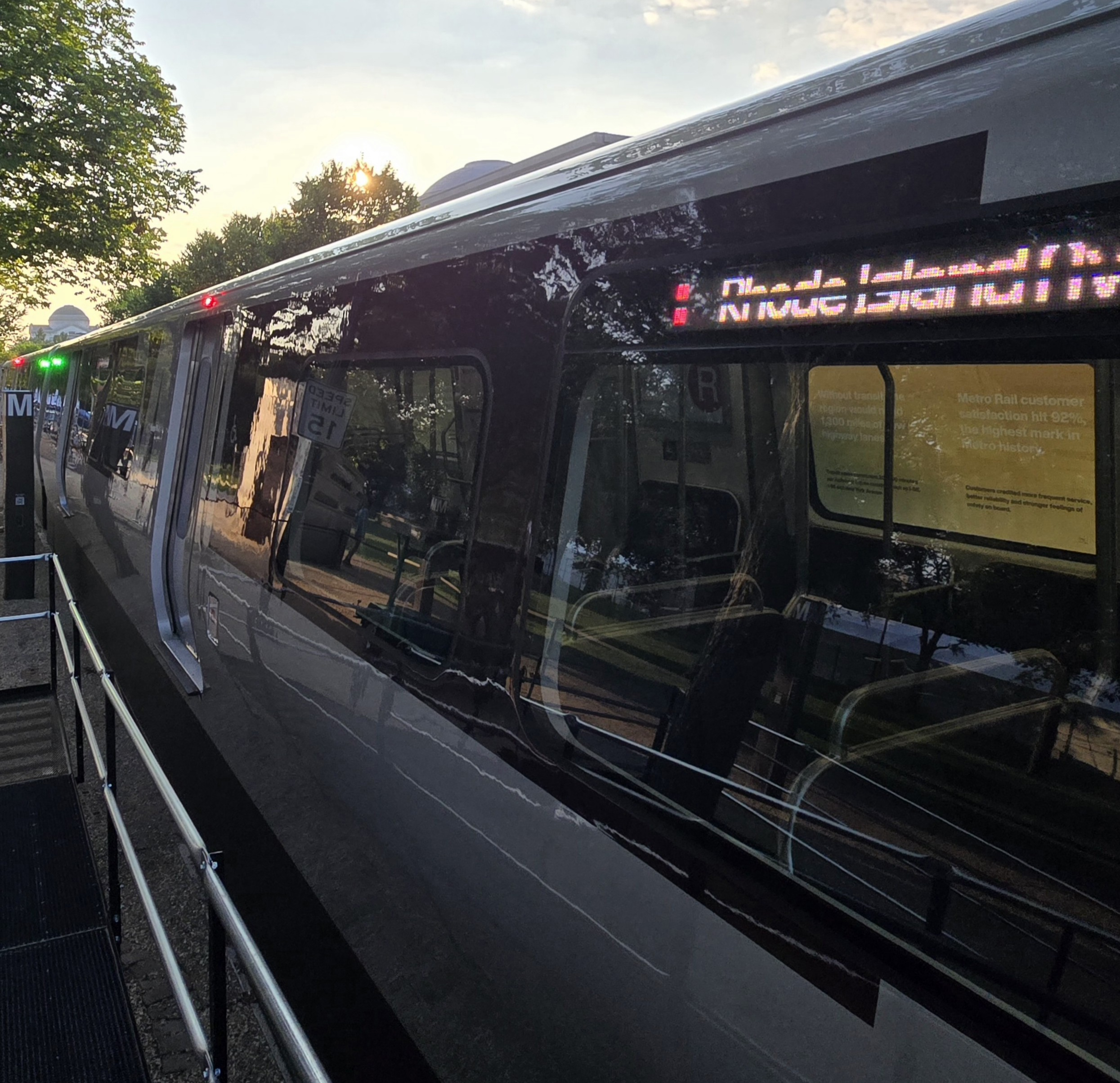
Side view of the 8000-series full-scale mockup. New features include flush windows (compared to previous car series) and door interlock status indicator lights; here the green light is illuminated, indicating the door interlock is engaged.

== Retired ==
=== Rohr 1000-series ===
Washington Metro 1000-series
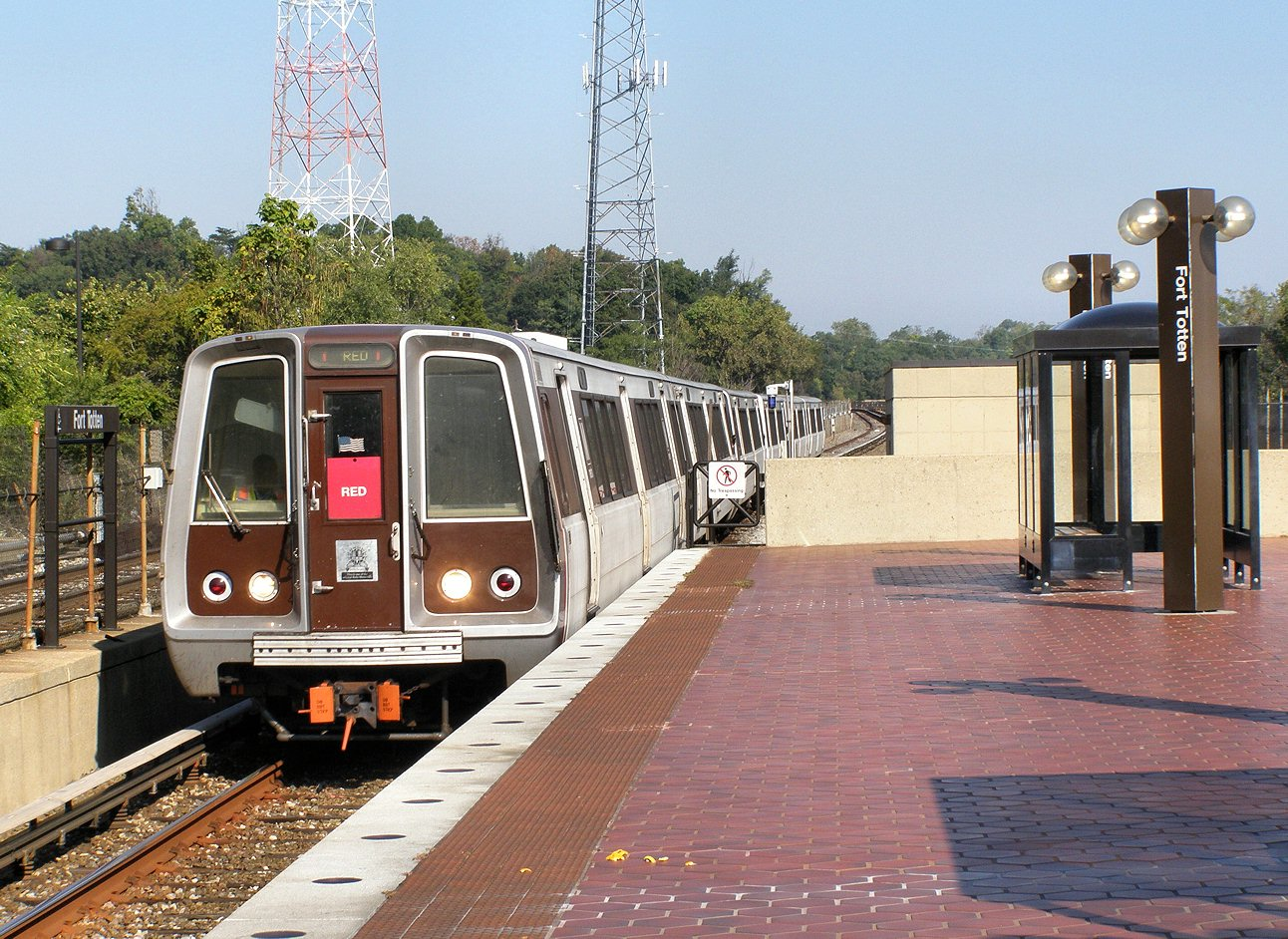
- Train of Rohr cars arrives at Fort Totten in November 2008

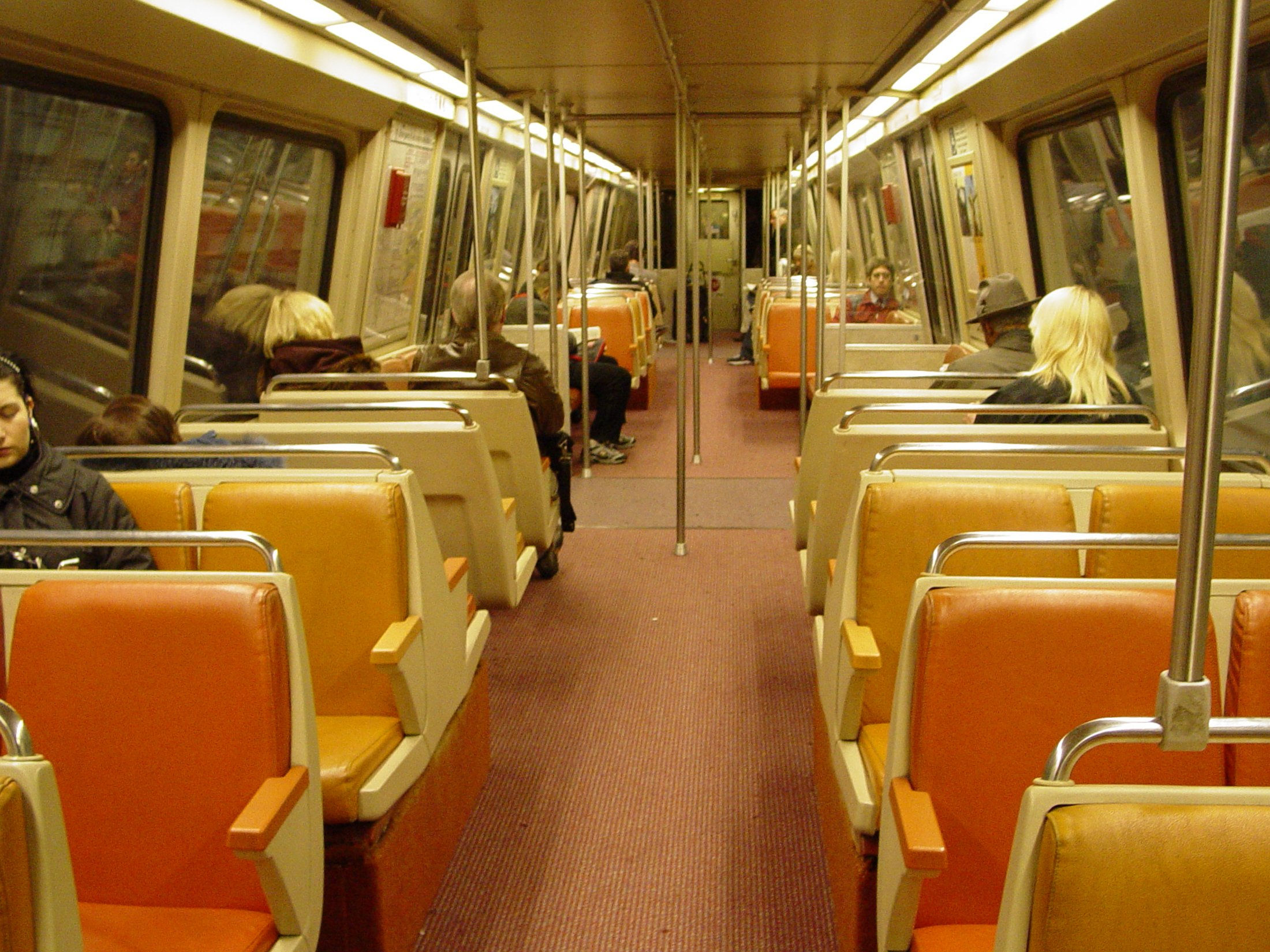
- Interior of Rohr 1112 in February 2006
- In service: 1976–2017
- Manufacturer: Rohr, Inc.
- Built at: Winder, Georgia
- Constructed: 1973–1978
- Entered service: 1976
- Refurbished: 1993–1996 by WMATA Brentwood Shop/Breda Costruzioni Ferroviarie
- Scrapped: 2016–2017
- Number built: 300
- Number preserved: 2
- Number scrapped: 288
- Successor: 7000-series
- Fleet numbers: 1000–1299
- Capacity: Seating: 82; Total: 175
- Operator: WMATA

Specifications
- Car body construction: Extruded aluminum
- Train length: 600 ft (182.88 m) (8-car train)
- Car length: 75 ft (22.86 m)
- Width: 10 ft 1 3/4 in (3.09 m)
- Height: 10 ft 10 in (3.30 m)
- Floor height: 40 in (1,016 mm)
- Doors: Sliding, 6 per car
- Maximum speed: 75 mph (121 km/h)
- Traction system: Westinghouse cam-control (as built); GE GTO–VVVF (after refurbishment)
- Traction motors: Westinghouse DC motor (as built); 4 × GE 5GEB 186.5 kW (250.1 hp) 3-phase AC 4-pole induction motor (after refurbishment)
- Power output: 1,492 kW (2,001 hp) (after refurbishment)
- Acceleration: 2.8 mph/s (4.5 km/(h⋅s))
- Electric system: 750 V DC (nominal) from third rail
- Current collection: Contact shoe
- UIC classification: Bo′Bo′+Bo′Bo′
- AAR wheel arrangement: B-B+B-B
- Bogies: Cast steel
- Braking system: ABEX Hydraulics
- Track gauge: 4 ft 8 1/4 in (1,429 mm)

The original order of 300 Metro cars was manufactured by Rohr Industries in 1973, with delivery in 1976. These cars were numbered 1000–1299, and rehabilitated in the mid-1990s by Breda Costruzioni Ferroviarie and WMATA at their Brentwood Shop in northeast Washington, D.C.

==== Features ====
Two major characteristics distinguished the 1000-series from the later series cars. On their sides, the cars had two mylar curtain rollsigns, one above a window next to the doors on each end (while the other car classes have a single flip-dot or LED sign above a window next to the center doors). Second, the bulkheads on each end of the 1000-series cars featured windows that extended to the top of the bulkhead frame, whereas other car classes' bulkhead windows only extend slightly higher than the side windows. These cars were the only cars to have curtain rollsigns. During rehabilitation of these cars in 1993, an exterior loudspeaker was added in place of where one of the rollsigns used to be. The cars also received General Electric three-phase AC propulsion (same as that of the Breda A650 railcar used on LA Metro Rail), replacing the original Westinghouse cam-control DC propulsion systems, making them the first cars on the system to use such propulsion systems.

The 1000-series had more seating capacity than the other cars, with 82 seats. The original interiors had a white grained appearance with orange and brown seats. These cars had the standing capacity of 175 passengers, the same amount as their successors, until the arrival of the 7000-series cars, which increased the standing capacity.

Around August 2008, Metrorail tested new overhead handles of different styles on railcars 1122–1123 and 1126–1127, as well as some 3000-series cars to gauge public opinion.

==== Incidents and repurposing ====
Car 1028 was separated from its mate, car 1029, which was destroyed during the Federal Triangle derailment in 1982. The car became the clearance car for the metro until it was retired in April 2016.

Car 1076 was taken out of service and was then used as a parts source after its mate, car 1077 was destroyed in the 2004 accident at the Woodley Park station.

Car 1079 was the lead car on the second train involved in the June 22, 2009, Washington Metro train collision and was subsequently destroyed. Its mate, car 1078, was used as a parts source until it was scrapped in 2017. Cars 1106–1107 and 1170–1171 were retired following damage from a collision at Falls Church rail yard on November 29, 2009.

Four cars, formerly numbered 1010–1011 and 1044–1045, were renumbered to 8000–8003 and served as the "money train" to collect the revenue from station fare card machines. A third pair, 1092–1093, was converted in April 2016 and was renumbered to 8004–8005. Cars 8000–8001 were replaced by Alstom 6000-series cars 6182–6183 in 2018, and the other four were replaced by Breda 2000-series cars 2016–2017 on May 20, 2020.

Following the June 22, 2009, collision, Metro implemented a policy of no longer placing 1000-series railcar pairs at the ends of trains in order to prevent telescoping in a collision, as they were structurally the weakest rolling stock. The new policy placed 1000-series cars in the center of six and eight-car trains, with rail cars of other series in the end positions.

==== Retirement ====
The 7000-series cars started replacing these cars in 2016. In July 2015, Metro released a request for proposals seeking a contractor to pick-up and dispose of Metro's entire remaining fleet of 1000-series railcars. Metro announced on June 7, 2017, that the 1000-series cars would be fully retired and removed from service on July 1, 2017, after running for 41 years. On October 27, 2017, WMATA announced that the last of the cars had been sent off property. However six cars numbered 8000–8005 remained in non-revenue work service, being used for the "money train". Cars 8000–8001 were retired in 2018 while cars 8002–8005 were retired on May 20, 2020.

==== Preservation ====
- 1000–1001 are preserved by WMATA. They are currently stored in Greenbelt Yard. Car 1000 was displayed at the National Mall between June 25 and July 10, 2026.
- 1090–1091 were sent to the Asymmetric Warfare Training Center at Fort AP Hill.
- 1024–1025, 1070–1071, 1130–1131, and 1236–1237 were taken to the Guardian Centers facility in Georgia. Car 1025 was blown up to simulate a subway bombing response situation.

==== Gallery ====
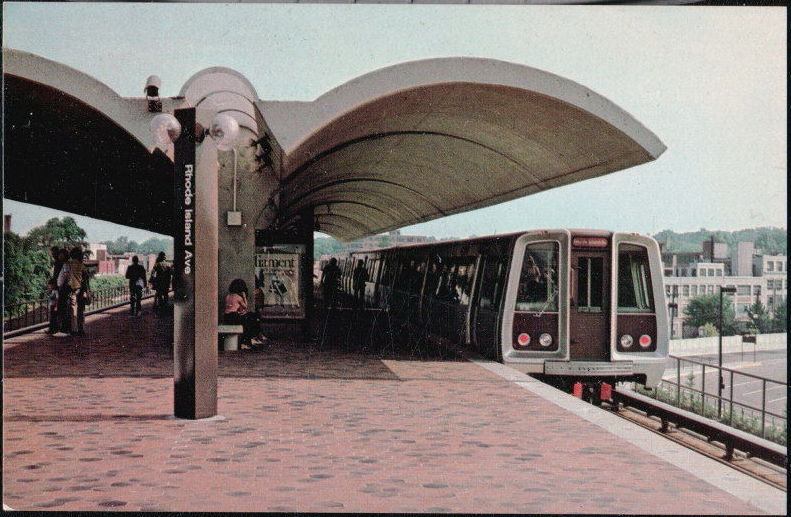
A 1000-Series train at Rhode Island Avenue in 1976.

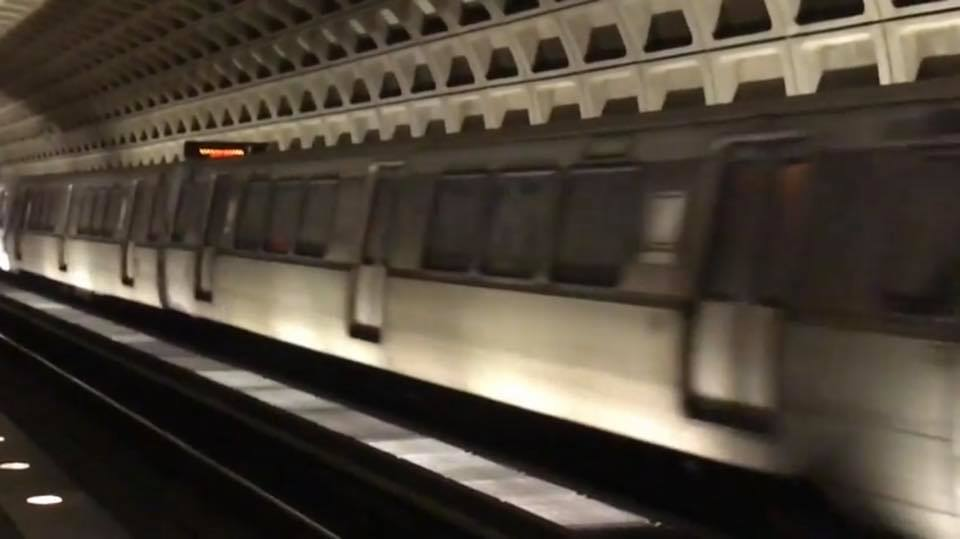
WMATA Rohr Money Train 8000–8001 (former car numbers 1010–1011) bypassing Pentagon City station. These cars were not rehabilitated along with 8002–8003 (former car numbers 1044–1045) and retain their original roll signs.

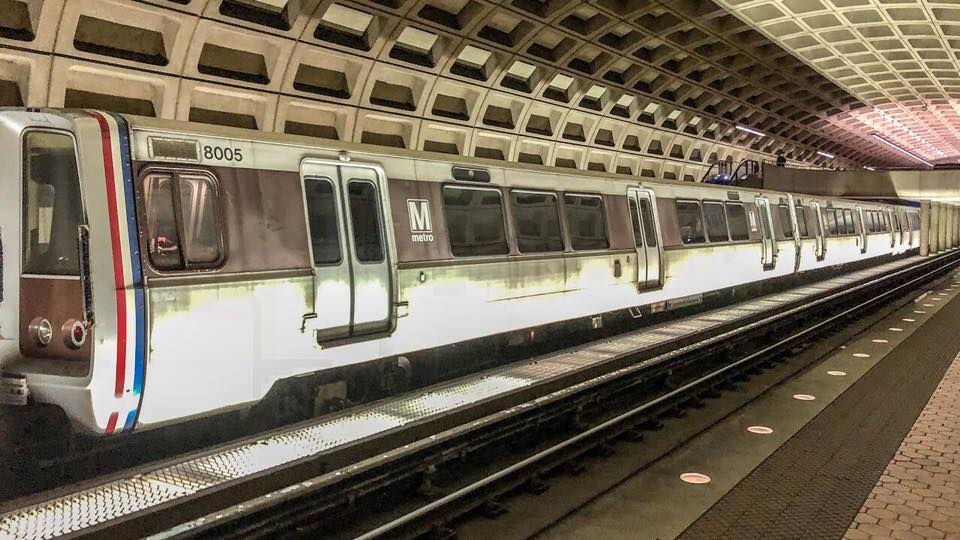
WMATA Rohr 8005 at Pentagon City. 8004–8005 were formerly cars 1092–1093 that were converted in 2016.

=== Breda 2000-series ===
Washington Metro 2000-series
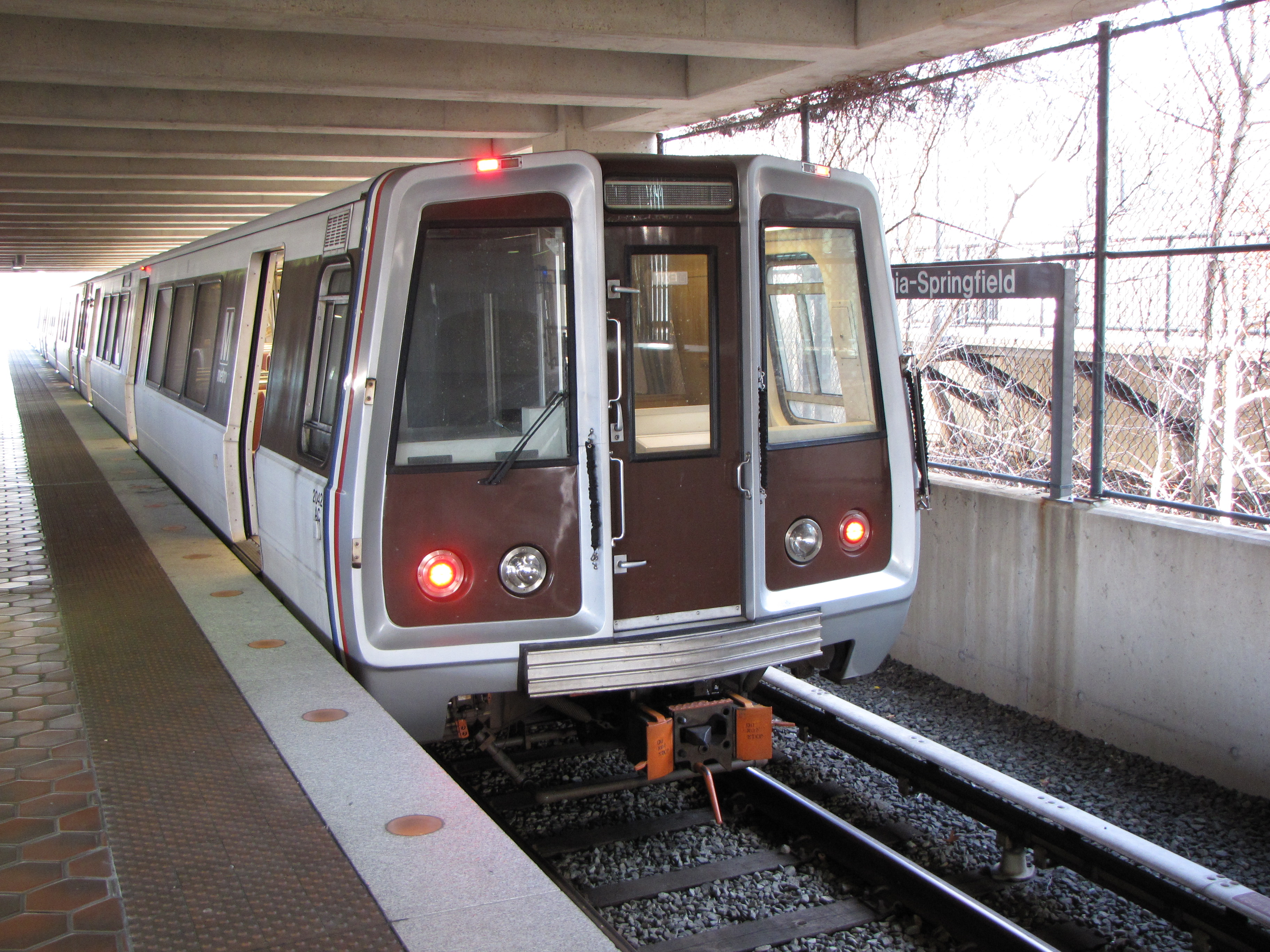
- A train of 2000-series Breda cars at Franconia–Springfield in February 2009 following rehabilitation

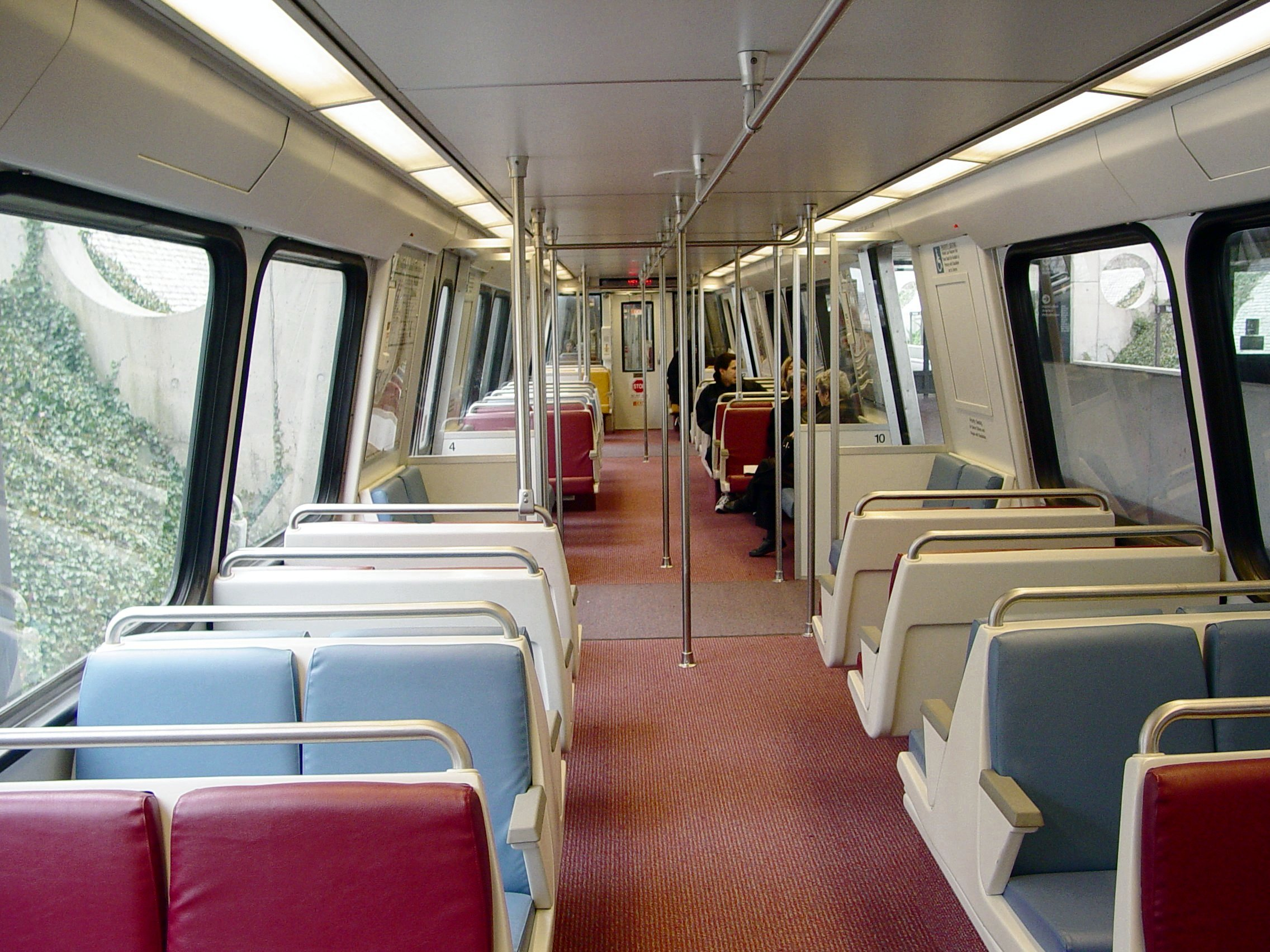
- Interior of Breda 2075 in January 2004 following rehabilitation
- In service: 1983–2024
- Manufacturer: Breda Costruzioni Ferroviarie
- Built at: Pistoia, Italy
- Constructed: 1981–1983
- Refurbished: 2002–2004 by Alstom
- Scrapped: 2024
- Number built: 76
- Number in service: 0; (2 in work service)
- Successor: 8000-series
- Fleet numbers: 2000–2075
- Capacity: Seating: 68; Total: 175
- Operator: WMATA

Specifications
- Car body construction: Extruded aluminum
- Train length: 600 ft (182.88 m) (8-car train)
- Car length: 75 ft (22.86 m)
- Width: 10 ft 1 3/4 in (3.09 m)
- Height: 10 ft 10 in (3.30 m)
- Floor height: 40 in (1,016 mm)
- Doors: Sliding, 6 per car
- Maximum speed: 75 mph (121 km/h)
- Traction system: Westinghouse cam-control (as built); Alstom ONIX 2000 2-level IGBT–VVVF (after refurbishment)
- Traction motors: DC motor (as built); 4 × Alstom 4 EXA 2122 165 kW (221 hp) 3-phase AC induction motor (after refurbishment)
- Power output: 1,320 kW (1,770 hp) (after refurbishment)
- Acceleration: 2.8 mph/s (4.5 km/(h⋅s))
- Electric system: 750 V DC (nominal) from third rail
- Current collection: Contact shoe
- UIC classification: Bo′Bo′+Bo′Bo′
- AAR wheel arrangement: B-B+B-B
- Bogies: Fabricated steel
- Track gauge: 4 ft 8 1/4 in (1,429 mm)

The second order, of 76 cars, was built by Breda Costruzioni Ferroviarie, with delivery in 1981. These cars were numbered 2000–2075, and were rehabilitated between 2002 and 2004 by Alstom in Hornell, New York.

==== Features ====
These cars were the first cars to have a single flip-dot sign above a window next to the center doors, instead of two rollsigns originally found on the 1000-series cars before rehabilitation. In place of the second side rollsign, these cars had an exterior loudspeaker. The 2000-series had 14 fewer seats than the 1000-series cars, while retaining the same amount of standing capacity. From 2002 to 2004, as part of the rehabilitation project, the 2000-series cars received new three-phase AC propulsion systems with IGBT technology, replacing the original cam-controlled DC propulsion systems. Also included were new railcar monitoring systems, exterior LED destination signs, interior LED next stop signs, and improved emergency exit signage. The refurbished railcars also received the red, white and blue interior found on the 5000-series cars.

==== History ====
In late 2018, cars 2016–2017 were removed from service with their seats and carpet removed and were converted into money train pairs, which replaced the 1000 series running the route. They were wrapped in a yellow vinyl wrap and entered service in spring 2020. Beginning in late 2023, the yellow vinyl wrap was removed and was repainted into an all silver design.

Beginning in early 2020, these cars were gradually placed into long-term storage due to the COVID-19 pandemic. They were not often in service since then due to reduced service. However, some were brought out when the 6000 series were sidelined in November 2020 but then once again stored due to low ridership from the COVID-19 pandemic. When the 7000 series were sidelined from service in October 2021, these cars began to gradually return to service once again to fill in the shortage gap, mostly paired with the 3000-series, remaining in service until March 2024.

==== Retirement ====
WMATA retired the 2000-series cars on May 10, 2024, with cars 2000-2001 preserved by WMATA, and two other cars are still used on the "money train." The last of the cars ran in March 2024 following the implementation of six-car 7000-series trains. On October 19, 2024, a ceremonial last trip of the 2000-series cars was run on the Green Line consisting of cars 2000-2001, 2038-2039, and 2058-2059.

=== Breda 4000-series ===
Washington Metro 4000-series
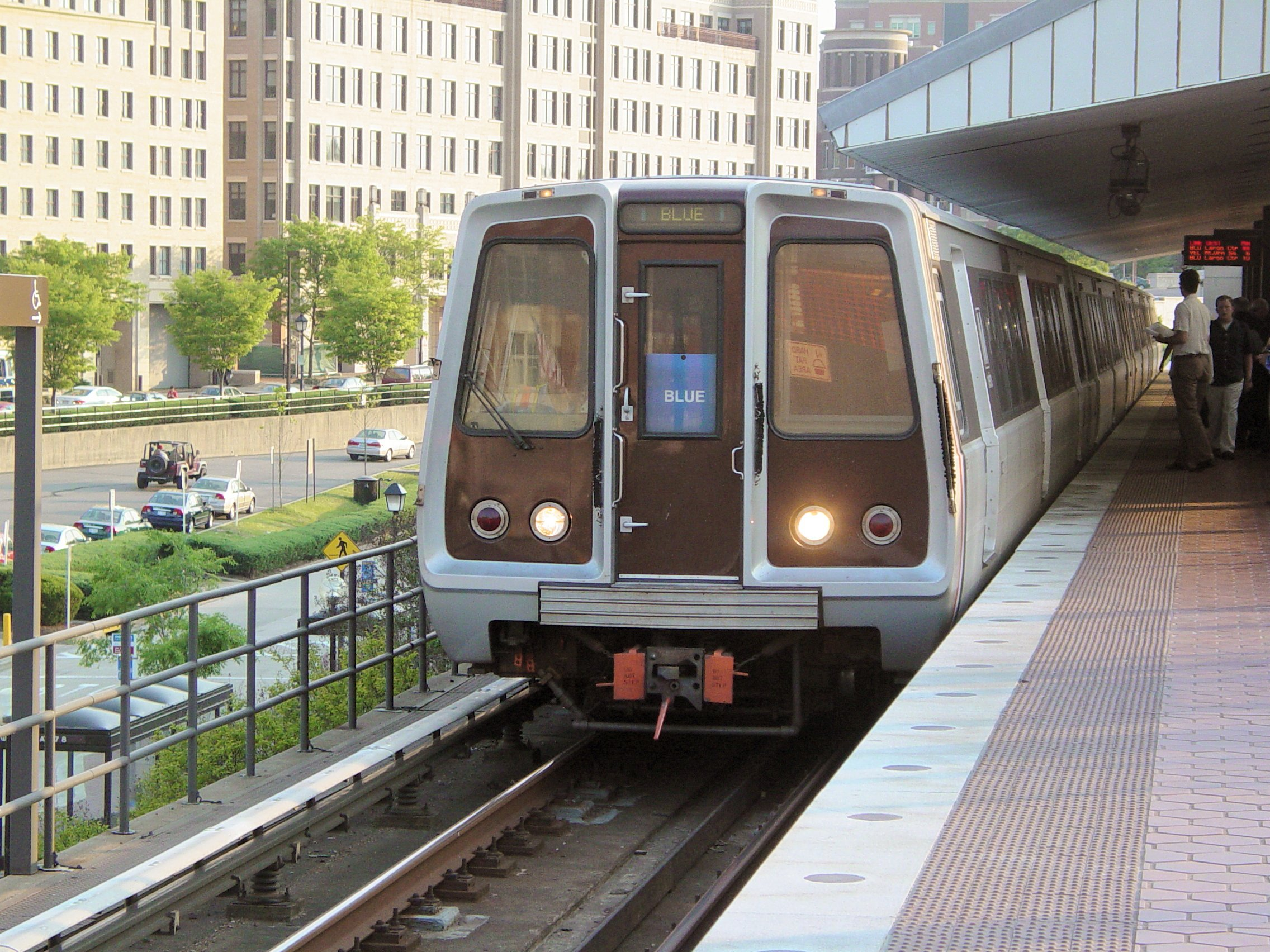
- A Blue Line train of Breda 4000-series cars arrives at King Street–Old Town in May 2005.

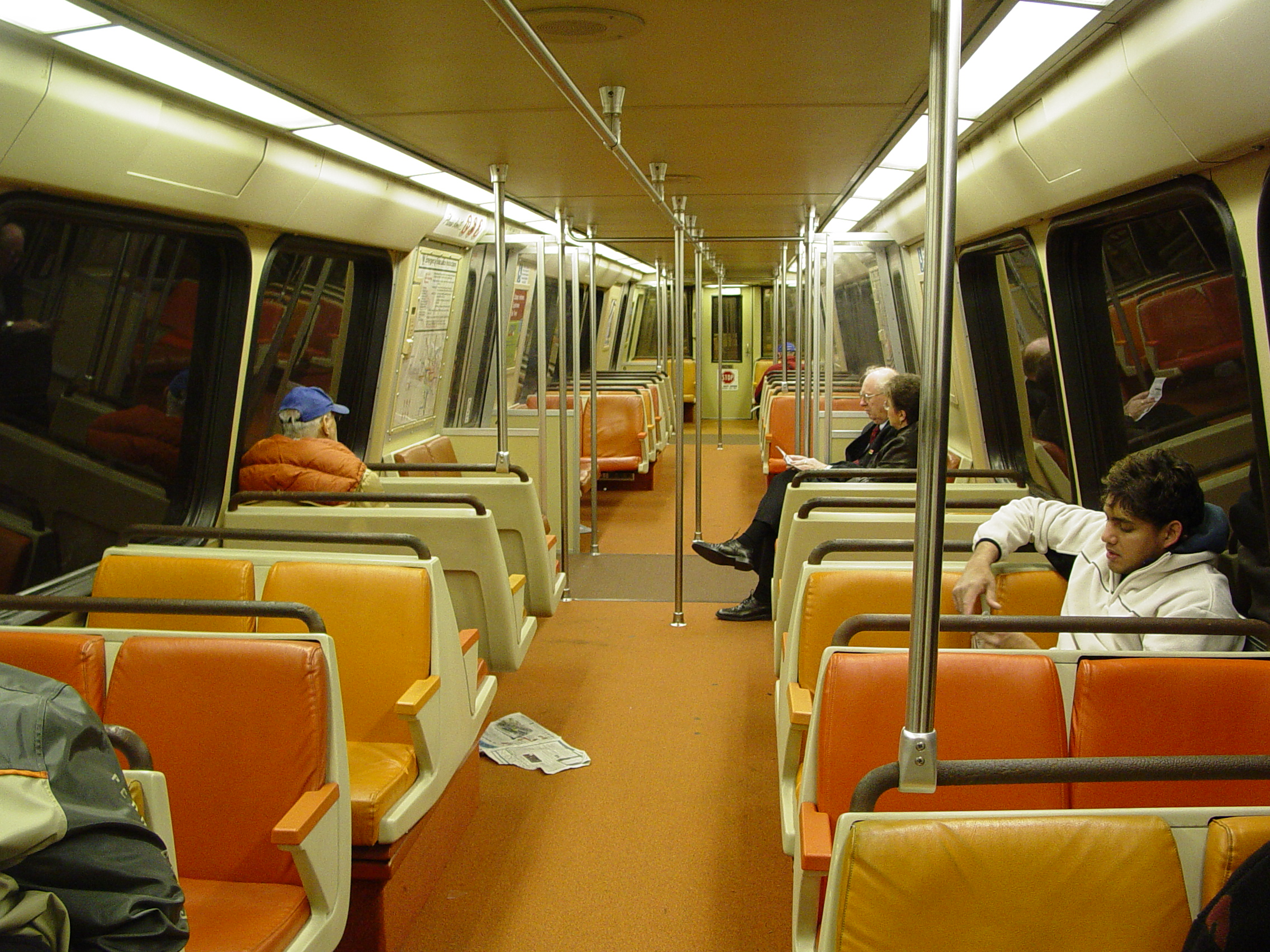
- Interior of Breda 4018
- In service: 1991–2017
- Manufacturer: Breda Costruzioni Ferroviarie
- Built at: Pistoia, Italy
- Constructed: 1991–1994
- Scrapped: 2017
- Number built: 100
- Number preserved: 2
- Number scrapped: 98
- Successor: 7000-series
- Fleet numbers: 4000–4099
- Capacity: Seating: 68; Total: 175
- Operator: WMATA

Specifications
- Car body construction: Extruded aluminum
- Train length: 600 ft (182.88 m) (8-car train)
- Car length: 75 ft (22.86 m)
- Width: 10 ft 1 3/4 in (3.09 m)
- Height: 10 ft 10 in (3.30 m)
- Floor height: 40 in (1,016 mm)
- Doors: Sliding, 6 per car
- Maximum speed: 75 mph (121 km/h)
- Weight: 78,000 lb (35,000 kg)
- Traction system: Westinghouse chopper control
- Traction motors: 4 × Westinghouse 1462 159.25 kW (213.56 hp) DC motor
- Power output: 1,274 kW (1,708 hp)
- Acceleration: 2.8 mph/s (4.5 km/(h⋅s))
- Electric system: 750 V DC (nominal) from third rail
- Current collection: Contact shoe
- UIC classification: Bo′Bo′+Bo′Bo′
- AAR wheel arrangement: B-B+B-B
- Bogies: Fabricated steel
- Track gauge: 4 ft 8 1/4 in (1,429 mm)

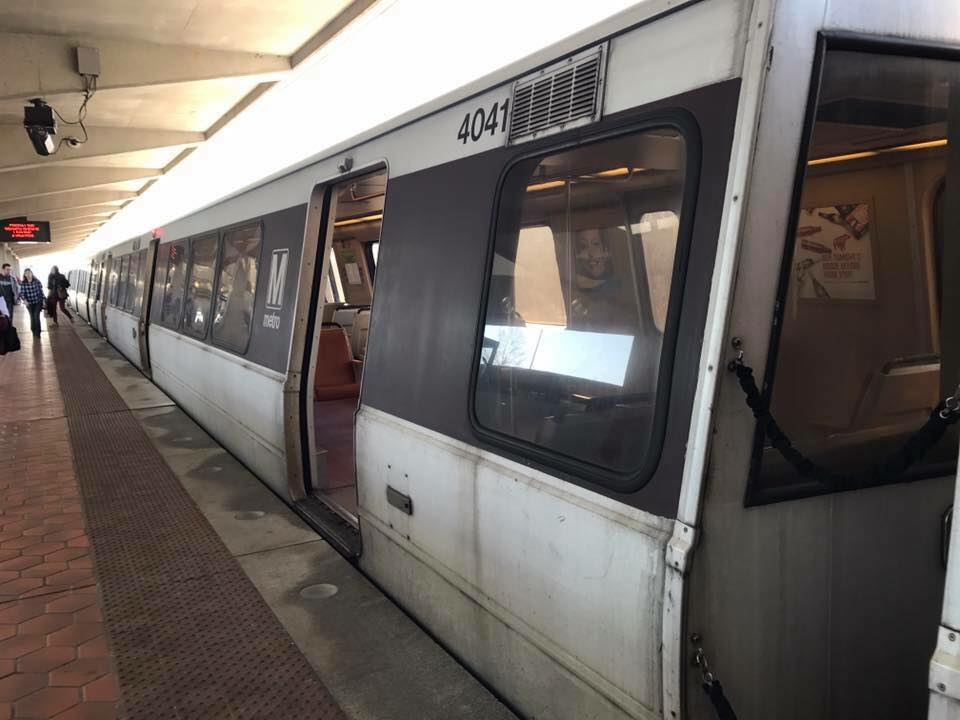
Breda 4041 at Greenbelt in February 2017. These cars were forced into the middle of trainsets (similar to the 1000 series) due to a glitch that could display an incorrect speed limit to a train operator while operating in manual mode in November 2016.

The fourth order consisted of 100 cars from Breda, numbered 4000–4099. These cars were delivered in 1991.

==== Features ====
There were some minor differences between these and the earlier Breda cars prior to rehabilitation. First, the bulkhead windows were rounded as compared to being squared, and like the 1000-series before refurbishment, these cars did not have exterior speakers.

These cars used the original flip-dot exterior destination signs, chopper-controlled DC propulsion system, and the original cream, orange and yellow interior all the way up to their retirement.

==== Incidents ====
Car 4060 was involved in an accident at Greenbelt Yard on June 8, 1998, when it jumped the metal bumper and crashed into the yards operation building. The car was repaired and returned to service.

Car 4018 was damaged in the Woodley Park collision on November 3, 2004, when car 1077 telescoped on top of it, but was repaired and returned to service.

On July 4, 2010, Metro took all 100 4000-series cars out of service to repair the door motors to prevent them from unintentionally opening while the train is in motion, a situation that Metro engineers were able to replicate in a rail yard. On July 20, the cars were returned to service after the repair was completed.

==== Retirement ====
These cars were to be rehabilitated starting 2014 onward based on design specifications that were partially drafted in 2010; however, WMATA indicated in subsequent budgets that it wished to replace these rail cars with an additional 100 7000-series cars instead of overhauling them. This resulted in an increase of new cars being delivered. According to an April 2013 Washington Post news story, the transit agency said that it would forgo updating the 4000-series rail cars, and Metro had exercised an option with Kawasaki to purchase an additional one hundred 7000-series cars to replace its 4000-series cars, costing an additional $215 million under the contract. In June 2015 Metro pulled all 4000-series railcars from service, following reports that doors were opening during travel; although no systemic problem was located, Metro kept the series out of service for more than a month to address door components that were below acceptable tolerance levels.

In July 2015, Metro released a request for proposals seeking a contractor to pick-up and then dispose of all 1000-series and 4000-series cars, as part of its plan to replace those cars with the new 7000-series cars. On November 17, 2016, Metro discovered a glitch in which a 4000-series car would display an incorrect speed limit to a train operator while in manual mode. All 4000-series cars were taken out of service in the afternoon, but were returned to service in the middle of trainsets. Metro announced that they would discontinue using 4000-series railcars in lead positions and considered accelerating the retirement of the cars to late 2017 or possibly earlier. On February 6, 2017, Metro confirmed the accelerated retirement of the 4000-series cars due to their many reliability concerns. According to WMATA, "The 4000-series rail cars were by far Metro's least reliable, traveling an average of only 27,259 miles (43,869 km) between delays. By contrast, the best performing cars, the 6000-series, are nearly four times more reliable, traveling more than 103,000 miles (166,000 km) between delays." On June 7, 2017, Metro announced that the 4000-series cars would be fully retired and removed from service on July 1, 2017, and by that date, all cars were taken out of service. The last of the cars left for scrapping on February 13, 2018.

==== Preservation and other uses ====
- 4000–4001 are preserved by WMATA. As of 2026, they remain in the Greenbelt Yard.
- 4020–4021 were sent to the Montgomery County Public Safety Training Academy in Maryland.
- 4044–4045 were acquired by the Loudoun County Combined Fire and Rescue System for its Metrorail Training Simulator, which was dedicated on June 28, 2017.
- 4074–4075 were sent to the New York State Preparedness Training Center.
- 4089 was sliced into seven sections and turned into vendor kiosks at the Grosvenor-Strathmore Metro Station as part of the pop up vendors plaza, which opened from May to June 30, 2017.

=== CAF/AAI 5000-series ===
Washington Metro 5000-series
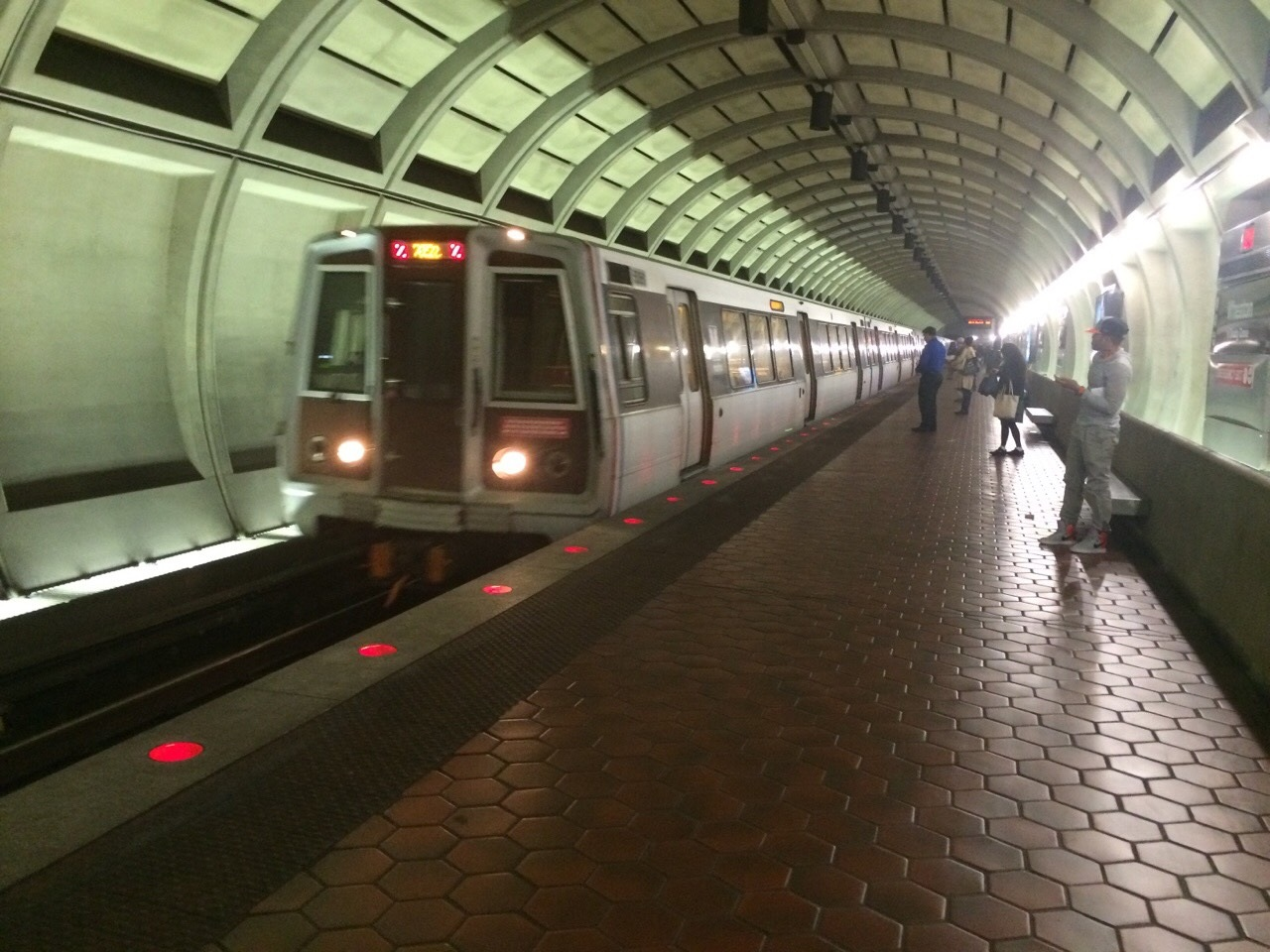
- 5000-series train arriving at Wheaton in October 2015

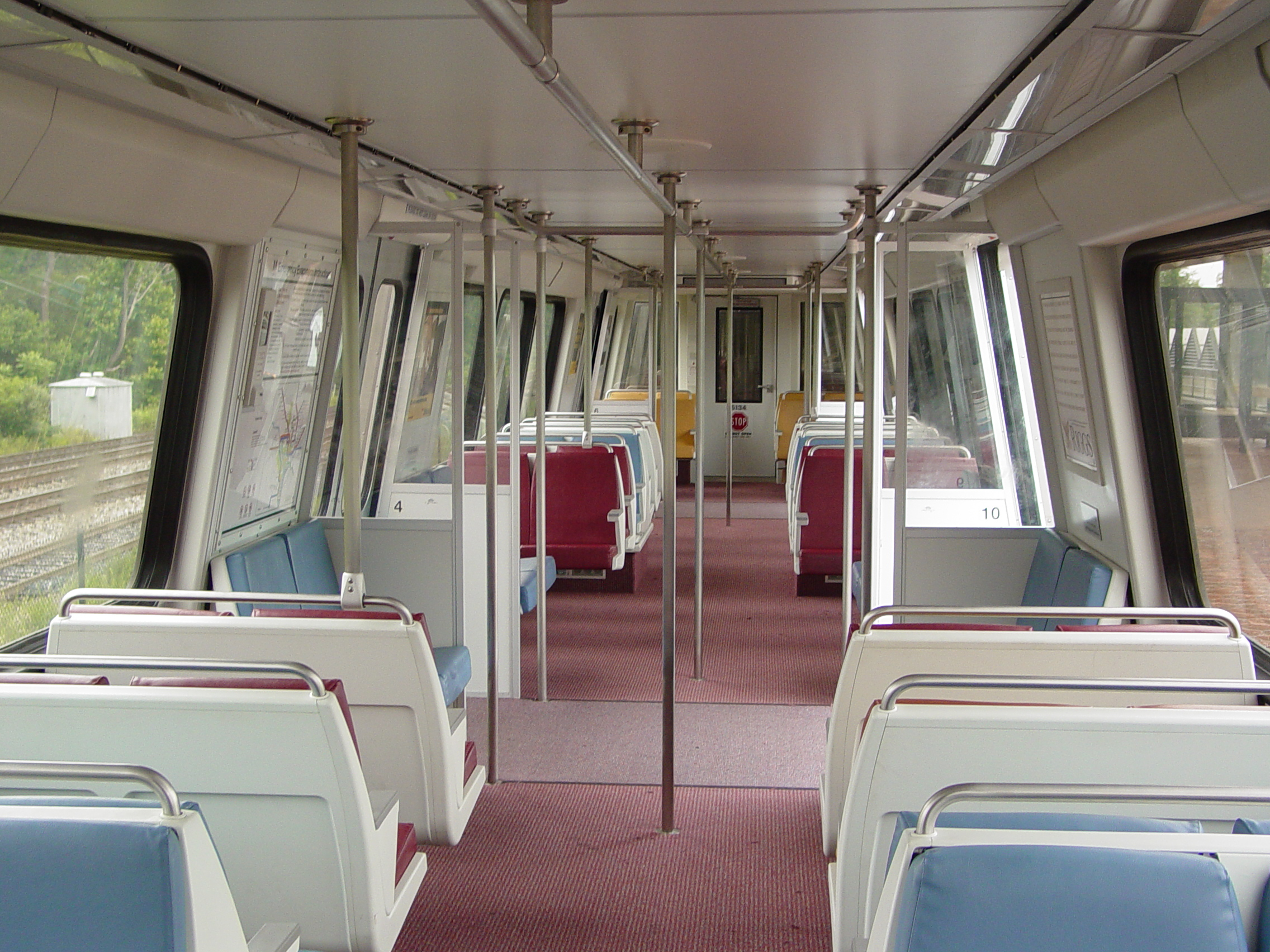
- Interior of CAF 5134
- In service: 2001–2018
- Manufacturers: CAF/AAI, Zaragoza and Bessain
- Built at: Spain and Hunt Valley, Maryland
- Constructed: 2001–2004
- Entered service: June 2001
- Scrapped: 2018–2019
- Number built: 192
- Number preserved: 2
- Number scrapped: 170
- Successor: 7000-series
- Fleet numbers: 5000–5191
- Capacity: Seating: 68; Total: 175
- Operator: WMATA

Specifications
- Car body construction: Extruded aluminum
- Train length: 600 ft (182.88 m) (8-car train)
- Car length: 75 ft (22.86 m)
- Width: 10 ft 1 3/4 in (3.09 m)
- Height: 10 ft 10 in (3.30 m)
- Floor height: 40 in (1,016 mm)
- Doors: Sliding, 6 per car
- Maximum speed: 75 mph (121 km/h)
- Weight: 77,000 lb (35,000 kg)
- Traction system: Bombardier MITRAC DR1000 2-level IGBT–VVVF
- Traction motors: 4 × 175 kW (235 hp) 3-phase AC induction motor
- Power output: 700 kW (940 hp)
- Acceleration: 2.8 mph/s (4.5 km/(h⋅s))
- Electric system: 750 V DC (nominal) from third rail
- Current collection: Contact shoe
- UIC classification: Bo′Bo′+Bo′Bo′
- AAR wheel arrangement: B-B+B-B
- Bogies: Cast steel
- Track gauge: 4 ft 8 1/4 in (1,429 mm)

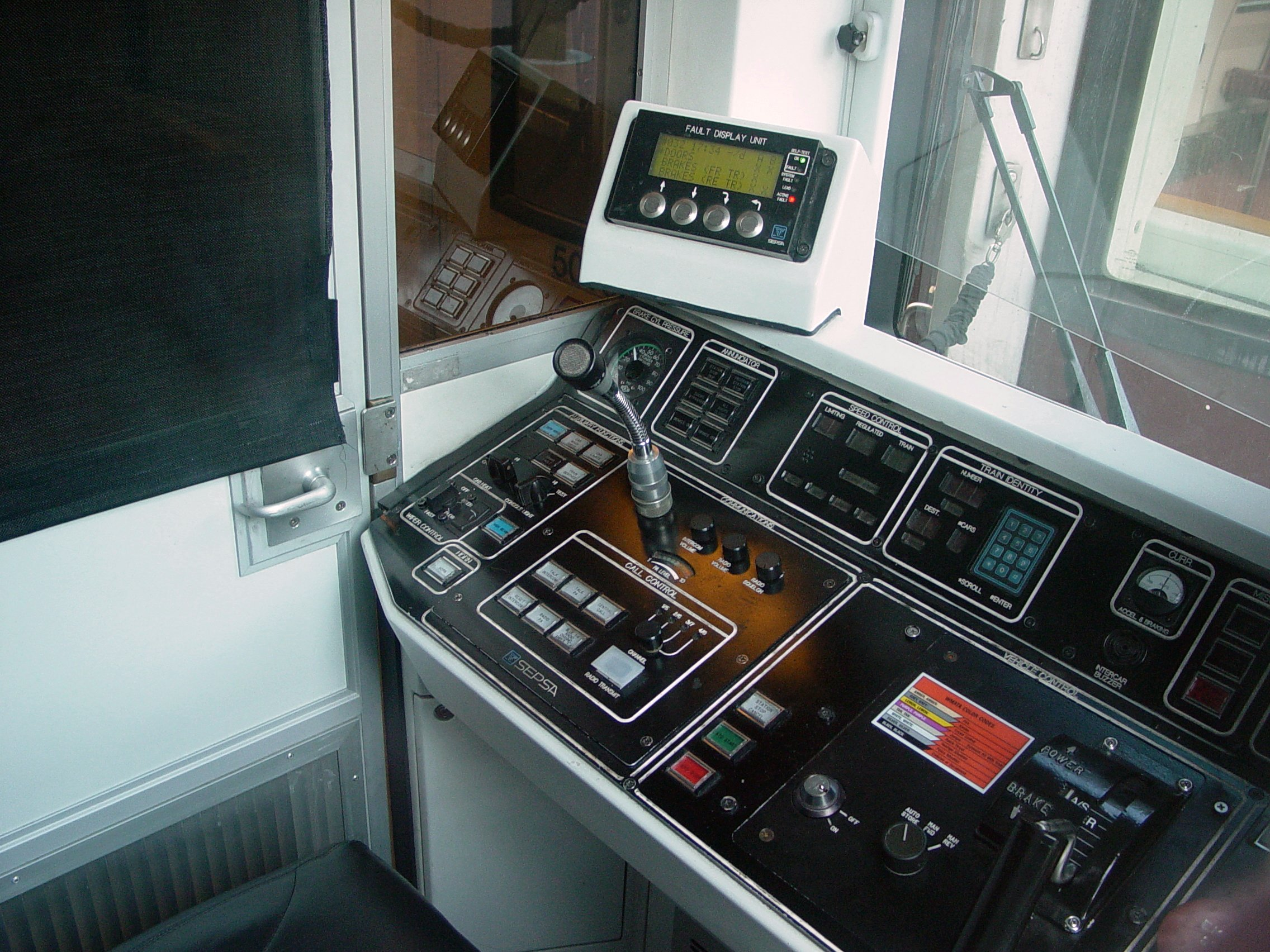
Cab of a 5000-series rail car

The fifth order consisted of 192 rail cars from a joint venture of Construcciones y Auxiliar de Ferrocarriles (CAF) of Spain and AAI Corporation of Hunt Valley, Maryland. These cars are numbered 5000–5191, with delivery in 2001. Service introduction of these cars was heavily delayed due to software "glitches" which plagued delivery. At one point, WMATA looked to impose penalties against CAF for the service entry delays.

==== Features ====
The contract consisted of CAF engineering, designing the cars, and managing the project, while AAI performed assembly. These cars were the first Metrorail cars to originally feature three-phase AC traction motors, this time with IGBT inverters. The traction motors on these cars were also used on the 2009 Stock on the London Underground Victoria line. They were also the first to have LED destination signs on the exterior and LED "next stop" indication signs on the interiors. Along with these improvements, they were also the first to have intercar safety barriers (which have since been added to all other rolling stock) and railcar monitoring systems. The 5000-series cars premiered the red, white and blue interior. This interior color scheme has also been used on the 2000/3000-series rehabilitation project and the 6000-series cars from Alstom.

Another feature was the return of cast steel trucks, which were previously used only on the Rohr cars. This was done as a cost-saving measure since fabricated trucks take additional time to manufacture due to the machining required.

==== Incidents ====
The National Transportation Safety Board began investigating issues with these cars due to non-revenue service derailments in Metrorail yards and the January 7, 2007, derailment of a revenue train on the Green Line at the Mount Vernon Square station.

Cars 5066–5067 were involved in the June 22, 2009, Washington Metro train collision being a part of the stationary train.

Cars 5152–5153 were involved in the Mount Vernon Square train derailment on January 7, 2007.

Cars 5056–5057 were damaged following a collision striking car 3217 at West Falls Church Yard on November 29, 2009. Both were repaired and returned to service, but however, 3217 was not repaired and got retired.

==== Retirement ====
The planned midlife rehabilitation of the 5000-series cars was to take place in the late 2010s through the early 2020s. Design specifications were to be drafted in 2017 with the first cars rehabbed in 2022. This series of cars would have been the third series to have automated station announcements and the stainless steel paint scheme, which would have made them compatible with the 7000-series once the rehabilitation process was completed.

On June 4, 2015, the Federal Transit Administration approved an early decommission of the 5000-series railcars, which were replaced with 7000-series railcars instead of being rehabbed. Retirement process began in 2017, and WMATA announced that the last cars were removed from service on October 12, 2018, although cars were reported still in service up until October 17. After retirement, some cars were used for work service such as de-icing tracks during the winter, and on the Silver Line Phase 2 construction, where they tested the tracks on the line and polished the third rail. The cars retained for work service were ultimately retired in spring 2019.

==== Preservation and other uses ====
- 5000–5001 are preserved by WMATA. As of 2026, they remain in the Greenbelt Yard.
- 5058–5059 were sold to a private investor. They were outside the West Hyattsville station beginning in September 2019 but were cut in two pieces and removed in January 2020. As of June 2021, car 5058 was repurposed into a bar in Northeast DC. Car 5059 is in storage on a private property in Halethorpe, MD.

== See also ==
- Purple Line (Maryland)
