= Veirs Mill Road Line =

Bus route in Washington Metropolitan Area

Q2, Q4, Q6
- Veirs Mill Road Line

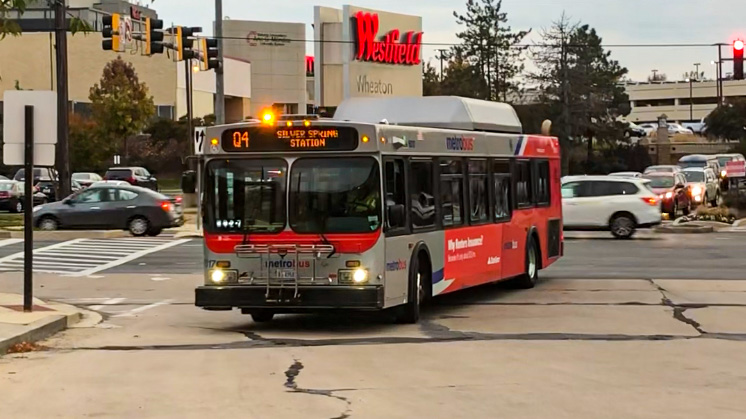
- Route Q4 at Wheaton station

Overview
- System: Metrobus
- Operator: Washington Metropolitan Area Transit Authority
- Garage: Montgomery
- Livery: Local
- Status: Replaced by route M20 and Ride On routes 40, and 55
- Began service: 1940s
- Ended service: June 29, 2025

Route
- Locale: Montgomery County, Maryland
- Communities served: Silver Spring, Forest Glen, Wheaton, Glenmont, Rockville, King Farm, Shady Grove, Derwood
- Landmarks served: Shady Grove station (Q2, Q6), Montgomery College (Q2, Q6), Rockville station, Wheaton station, Westfield Wheaton, Forest Glen station (Q2, Q4), Paul S. Sarbanes Transit Center (Silver Spring station) (Q2, Q4)
- Start: Q2, Q6: Shady Grove station Q4: Rockville station
- Via: Rockville Pike, Veirs Mill Road, Georgia Avenue
- End: Q2, Q4: Silver Spring station Q6: Wheaton station
- Length: 55-60 minutes

Service
- Level: Daily
- Frequency: 16-30 minutes (each line); 10 minutes (Weekday peak-hours); 15 minutes (Weekday midday and weekends); 30 minutes (Late nights)
- Operates: 4:15 AM - 12:40 AM (Monday - Thursday); 4:15 AM - 1:40 AM (Friday); 4:45 AM - 1:40 AM (Saturday); 5:50 AM - 12:40 AM (Sunday)
- Ridership: 455,238 (Q2, FY 2024); 838,786 (Q4, FY 2024); 710,937 (Q6, FY 2024)
- Transfers: SmarTrip only
- Timetable: Veirs Mills Road Line

The Veirs Mill Road Line, designated routes Q2, Q4, Q6, were daily bus routes operated by the Washington Metropolitan Area Transit Authority between Silver Spring and Shady Grove Metro stations of the Red Line of the Washington Metro. The line operated every 16–30 minutes at all times at a combined frequency of 10 minutes during weekday peak-hours, 15 minutes during the weekday midday and weekends, and 30 minutes during the late nights. All trips roughly took 55–60 minutes. The line operated along the Veirs Mill Road (MD 586) corridor connecting passengers to various Metro stations and communities. The line was transferred to Ride On and renamed to Route 40 during WMATA's Better Bus Redesign in June 2025.

== Background ==
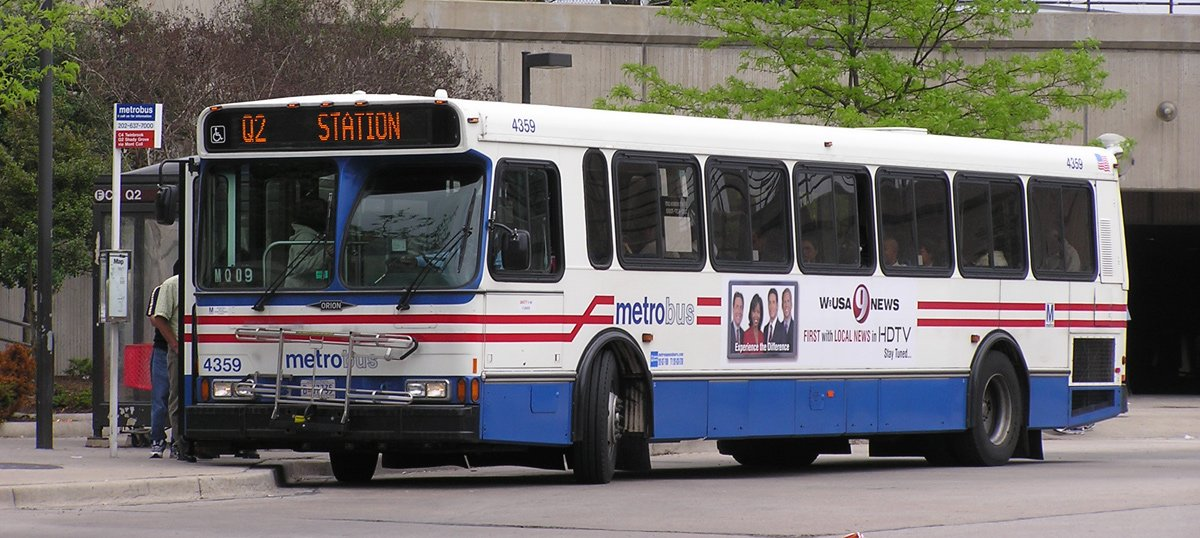
Route Q2 heading to Wheaton station

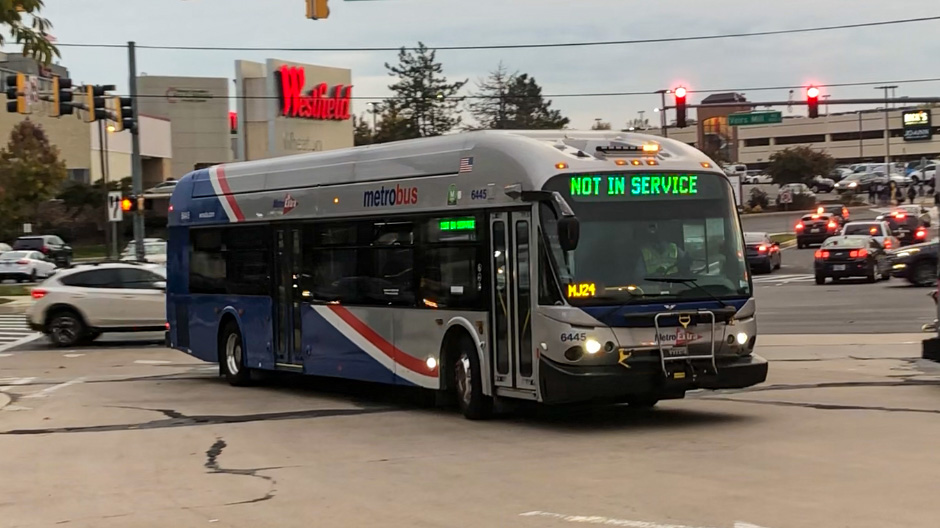
Entering Wheaton station as Not In Service but formerly route Q6

The Veirs Mill Road Line consisted of routes Q2, Q4 and Q6. Route Q2 operated between Silver Spring and Shady Grove Metro stations. Route Q4 operated between Silver Spring and Rockville Metro stations. Route Q6 operated between Wheaton and Shady Grove Metro stations. All three of the routes operated under the same routing between Wheaton and Rockville stations. Most of the Q2 and Q6 trips served Montgomery College's Rockville campus, except during early morning and late night hours (before 6 AM and after 10 PM), and all day on a Sunday. During AM peak, the Q4 route did not operate, and all of the Q2 trips operated between Silver Spring and Montgomery College's Rockville campus only. The scheduling of the routes went as the following:

- Route Q2 operated during the AM Peak Hours and after 6:20 PM on weekdays, and before 8:00 AM and after 7:00 PM on Saturdays and before 8:00 AM and after 5:00 PM on Sundays.
- Route Q4 operated daily until 7:00 PM between Monday and Friday, until 8:00 PM on Saturdays and until 5:00 PM on Sundays.
- Route Q6 operated from Monday through Friday from 5:05 AM until 7:35 PM, from 7:00 AM until 7:35 PM on Saturdays and from 9:00 AM until 5:35 PM on Sundays.

Routes Q2, Q4 and Q6 operated out of Montgomery division. They sometimes utilized articulated buses due to their high ridership volumes.

=== Route stops ===
Bus stop	Direction	Q2	Q4	Q6	Connections
Montgomery County, Maryland
Silver Spring station Bus Bay 218	Northbound station, Southbound terminal	check	check	☒	Metrobus: 70, 79, F4, J1, J2, S2, S9, Y2, Y7, Y8, Z2, Z6, Z7, Z8; Ride On: 1, 2, 4, 5, 8, 9, 11, 12, 13, 14, 15, 16, 17, 18, 19, 20, 21, 22, 28, Flash BRT (Blue, Orange); MTA Maryland Bus: 915, 929; Shuttle-UM: 111; Peter Pan Bus; Washington Metro: MARC: Brunswick Line; MTA: Purple Line (Planned)
Georgia Avenue / Ellsworth Drive	Northbound	check	check	☒	Metrobus: F4, Y2, Y7, Y8; Ride On: 12, 13, 14, 16, 17, 20
Wayne Avenue / Dixon Avenue	Southbound	check	check	☒	Metrobus: 70, Y2, Y7, Y8
Georgia Avenue / Colesville Road	Southbound	check	check	☒	Metrobus: Y2, Y7, Y8; Ride On: 8, 21, 22
Georgia Avenue / Cameron Street	Bidirectional	check	check	☒	Metrobus: Y2, Y7, Y8; Ride On: 28
Georgia Avenue / Spring Street	Bidirectional	check	check	☒	Metrobus: Y2, Y7, Y8
Georgia Avenue / Ballard Street	Bidirectional	check	check	☒	Metrobus: Y2, Y7, Y8
Georgia Avenue / Noyes Drive	Bidirectional	check	check	☒	Metrobus: Y2, Y7, Y8
Georgia Avenue / Highland Drive	Bidirectional	check	check	☒	Metrobus: Y2, Y7, Y8
Georgia Avenue / Grace Church Road	Bidirectional	check	check	☒	Metrobus: Y2, Y7, Y8
Georgia Avenue / Luzerne Avenue	Bidirectional	check	check	☒	Metrobus: Y2, Y7, Y8
Georgia Avenue / Seminary Place	Bidirectional	check	check	☒	Metrobus: Y2, Y7, Y8
Georgia Avenue / Forest Glen Road Forest Glen station	Bidirectional	check	check	☒	Metrobus: Y2, Y7, Y8; Ride On: 7, 8 Washington Metro:
Georgia Avenue / Tilton Drive	Northbound	check	check	☒	Metrobus: Y2, Y7, Y8
Georgia Avenue / American Finnmark Entrance	Southbound	check	check	☒	Metrobus: Y2, Y7, Y8
Georgia Avenue / Belvedere Boulevard	Bidirectional	check	check	☒	Metrobus: Y2, Y7, Y8
Georgia Avenue / August Drive	Northbound	check	check	☒	Metrobus: Y2, Y7, Y8
Georgia Avenue / Hildarose Drive	Southbound	check	check	☒	Metrobus: Y2, Y7, Y8
Georgia Avenue / Dexter Avenue	Bidirectional	check	check	☒	Metrobus: Y2, Y7, Y8
Georgia Avenue / Dennis Avenue	Bidirectional	check	check	☒	Metrobus: Y2, Y7, Y8
Georgia Avenue / Evans Parkway	Northbound	check	check	☒	Metrobus: Y2, Y7, Y8
Georgia Avenue / Evans Drive	Southbound	check	check	☒	Metrobus: Y2, Y7, Y8
Georgia Avenue / Dayton Street	Northbound	check	check	☒	Metrobus: Y2, Y7, Y8
Georgia Avenue / Predella Drive	Southbound	check	check	☒	Metrobus: Y2, Y7, Y8
Georgia Avenue / Plyers Mill Road	Bidirectional	check	check	☒	Metrobus: Y2, Y7, Y8; Ride On: 37
Georgia Avenue / Windham Lane	Bidirectional	check	check	☒	Metrobus: Y2, Y7, Y8; Ride On: 37
Georgia Avenue / Veirs Mill Road	Southbound	check	check	☒	Metrobus: Y2, Y7, Y8; Ride On: 37
Wheaton Station Bus Bays A and C	Bidirectional	check	check	check	Ride On: 7, 8, 9, 31, 34, 37, 38, 48; Metrobus: C2, C4, Y2, Y7, Y8; Washington Metro:
Veirs Mill Road / University Boulevard	Bidirectional	check	check	check	Metrobus: C2 (Eastbound only), C4; Ride On: 8 (Northbound Only), 9 (Northbound only), 34, 38, 48
Veirs Mill Road / University Boulevard	Bidirectional	check	check	check	Metrobus: C4; Ride On: 34, 38, 48
Veirs Mill Road / Galt Avenue	Northbound	check	check	check	Metrobus: C4; Ride On: 34, 38, 48
Veirs Mill Road / College View Drive	Southbound	check	check	check	Metrobus: C4; Ride On: 34, 38, 48
Veirs Mill Road / Norris Drive	Bidirectional	check	check	check	Metrobus: C4; Ride On: 34, 38, 48
Veirs Mill Road / Newport Mill Road	Bidirectional	check	check	check	Metrobus: C4; Ride On: 33, 34, 38, 48
Veirs Mill Road / Claridge Road	Bidirectional	check	check	check	Metrobus: C4; Ride On: 33, 34, 38, 48
Veirs Mill Road / Andrew Street	Northbound	check	check	check	Metrobus: C4; Ride On: 34, 38, 48
Veirs Mill Road / Gail Street	Southbound	check	check	check	Metrobus: C4; Ride On: 34, 38, 48
Veirs Mill Road / Centerhill Street	Southbound	check	check	check	Metrobus: C4; Ride On: 34, 38, 48
Veirs Mill Road / Connecticut Avenue	Bidirectional	check	check	check	Metrobus: C4, L8; Ride On: 34, 38, 48
Viers Mill Road / Ferrara Avenue	Bidirectional	check	check	check	Metrobus: C4; Ride On: 38, 48
Veirs Mill Road / Bushey Drive	Bidirectional	check	check	check	Metrobus: C4; Ride On: 48
Veirs Mill Road / Randolph Road	Bidirectional	check	check	check	Metrobus: C4, C8; Ride On: 10, 48
Veirs Mill Road / Gridley Road	Bidirectional	check	check	check	Ride On: 48
Veirs Mill Road / Havard Street	Bidirectional	check	check	check	Ride On: 48
Veirs Mill Road / Turkey Branch Parkway	Northbound	check	check	check	Ride On: 48
Veirs Mill Road / Edgebrook Road	Southbound	check	check	check	Ride On: 48
Veirs Mill Road / Parkland Drive	Northbound	check	check	check	Ride On: 48
Veirs Mill Road / Gaynor Road	Southbound	check	check	check	Ride On: 48
Veirs Mill Road / Robindale Road	Bidirectional	check	check	check	
Veirs Mill Road / #12701	Northbound	check	check	check	
Veirs Mill Road / #12704	Southbound	check	check	check	
Veirs Mill Road / Arbutus Avenue	Northbound	check	check	check	
Veirs Mill Road / Parklawn Memorial	Southbound	check	check	check	
Veirs Mill Road / Aspen Hill Road	Bidirectional	check	check	check	Ride On: 26
Veirs Mill Road / Twinbrook Parkway	Bidirectional	check	check	check	Ride On: 26, 45
Veirs Mill Road / Meadow Hall Drive	Bidirectional	check	check	check	
Veirs Mill Road / Atlantic Avenue	Bidirectional	check	check	check	
Veirs Mill Road / #1902	Northbound	check	check	check	
Veirs Mill Road / #1907	Southbound	check	check	check	
Veirs Mill Road / Nimitz Avenue	Northbound	check	check	check	
Veirs Mill Road / Midway Avenue	Southbound	check	check	check	
Veirs Mill Road / Okinawa Avenue	Bidirectional	check	check	check	Ride On: 44
Veirs Mill Road / Broadwood Drive	Bidirectional	check	check	check	Ride On: 44
Veirs Mill Road / Clagett Drive	Bidirectional	check	check	check	
Veirs Mill Road / Edmonston Drive	Bidirectional	check	check	check	
Veirs Mill Road / Woodburn Road	Bidirectional	check	check	check	
Veirs Mill Road / First Street	Bidirectional	check	check	check	
Veirs Mill Road / Dodge Street	Bidirectional	check	check	check	
Rockville Station Bus Bays D and G	Bidirectional	check	check	check	Ride On: 44, 45, 46, 47, 52, 55, 56, 59, 63, 81, 101, 301; Metrobus: T2; Washington Metro: MARC: Brunswick Line; Amtrak: Capitol Limited
Hungerford Drive / Beall Avenue	Bidirectional	check	☒	check	
Hungerford Drive / #451	Bidirectional	check	☒	check	
Hungerford Drive / North Washington Street	Bidirectional	check	☒	check	
Hungerford Drive / Frederick Avenue	Bidirectional	check	☒	check	Ride On: 45, 46, 55
Mannakee Street / Hungerford Drive	Bidirectional	check	☒	check	Ride On: 46, 55
Mannakee Street / South Campus Drive	Bidirectional	check	☒	check	Ride On: 46, 55
Montgomery College / West Campus Drive	Bidirectional	check	☒	check	Ride On: 46, 55, 101
Mannakee Street / South Campus Drive	Bidirectional	check	☒	check	Ride On: 46, 55
Mannakee Street / Hungerford Drive	Bidirectional	check	☒	check	Ride On: 46, 55
Frederick Road / Mannakee Street	Bidirectional	check	☒	check	Ride On: 45, 55
Hungerford Drive / Campus Drive	Bidirectional	check	☒	check	Ride On: 45, 55
Frederick Road / College Parkway	Bidirectional	check	☒	check	Ride On: 45, 55 (Northbound only)
Frederick Road / East Gude Drive	Northbound	check	☒	check	Ride On: 45, 55
Frederick Road / West Gude Drive	Southbound	check	☒	check	Ride On: 45
Frederick Road / #15501	Northbound	check	☒	check	Ride On: 55
Frederick Road / West Gude Drive	Southbound	check	☒	check	Ride On: 55
Frederick Road / Indianola Drive	Northbound	check	☒	check	Ride On: 55
Frederick Road / Watkins Pond Boulevard	Southbound	check	☒	check	Ride On: 55
Frederick Road / Redland Road	Bidirectional	check	☒	check	Ride On: 55
Sommerville Drive / Redland Road	Bidirectional	check	☒	check	Ride On: 55, 57, 59, 63, 66
Sommerville Drive / #15910	Southbound	check	☒	check	Ride On: 55, 57, 59, 63, 66
Shady Grove station Bus Bay C	Southbound station, Northbound terminal	check	☒	check	Ride On: 43, 46, 53, 55, 57, 58, 59, 60, 61, 63, 64, 65, 66, 67, 71, 74, 76, 78, 79, 90, 100, 101, PINK, LIME; MTA Maryland Bus: 201, 202, 991; Washington Metro:

== History ==
=== Introduction ===
Route Q2 originally operated under the Washington Suburban Lines bus company when it was introduced in the 1940s. The line provided service along Veirs Mill Road between Wheaton and Rockville Maryland and later Silver Spring.

=== 1970s ===
The Washington Suburban Lines was later acquired by DC Transit, and then became a WMATA route on February 4, 1973, when WMATA acquired DC Transit.

The Veirs Mill Road Line originally consisted of routes Q1, Q2, and Q7. They would all operate between Silver Spring station and Montgomery Village. The Q1 would make some trips to the U.S. Atomic Energy Commission in Germantown, while the Q7 would operate through Wheaton Woods via Aspen Hill Road and Parkland Drive.

On February 21, 1978, routes Q1 and Q7 were eliminated. Meanwhile, the Q2 would be truncated from Montgomery Village to the Rockville Campus of Montgomery College. On the same day, routes Q4 and Q8 would be added to the line. Route Q4 would operate between Silver Spring station and Rock Creek Village, and route Q8 would operate between Montgomery Mall and Silver Spring station.

=== 1980s ===
On December 15, 1984, when both Shady Grove and Rockville Metro stations opened, route Q2 was extended to terminate at Shady Grove Metro station and route Q4 was extended to Rockville Metro station.

On January 27, 1985, route Q4 would be redesignated as the Parkland Drive Line. That designation would remain until 1994, when it would be replaced by Ride On's current route 48. On the same day, Metrobus route Q8 would be eliminated and replaced by Ride On routes 38 and 47. Route 38 would replace the portion of the route between Wheaton Mall and Congressional Plaza, while route 47 would replace the portion of the route that operated along Seven Locks Road.

=== 1990s ===
On September 22, 1990, the line was slightly rerouted to serve the Wheaton station bus bays when the station opened. On the same day, route Q1 would be reincarnated to operate between Wheaton station and Rockville station. It would provide supplemental express service along Veirs Mill Road during rush hour.

Routes Q1 and Q2 would operate the Veirs Mill Road Line on its own between Silver Spring station and Shady Grove station via Montgomery College along Georgia Avenue and Veirs Mill Road.

=== 2000s ===
On January 13, 2001, route Q1 was discontinued and replaced by route Q2.

In 2009, WMATA proposed to restructure the Veirs Mill Road Line. In coordination with Montgomery County and the Maryland Department of Transportation, WMATA proposed to restructure route Q2 in order to address continuing performance-related issues, including schedule adherence, bus bunching, traffic congestion, delays, passenger crowding, and long trip duration.

WMATA proposed to split the Q2 into two routes into a Q2A and Q2B. Route Q2A would operate between Shady Grove and Wheaton Metro stations while route Q2B will operate between Rockville and Silver Spring Metro stations. The proposal will provide overlapping service along Veirs Mill Road between Wheaton and Rockville operating daily with a 7.5-minute peak service and 15-minute off-peak service, while providing wider headways along the Maryland Route 355 segment (Shady Grove to Rockville), where parallel Ride On service is available and the well-served Georgia Avenue segment (Wheaton to Silver Spring, where parallel Metrobus service is available) with 15-minute peak service and 30-minute off-peak service. A new limited bus stop route along Veirs Mill Road will be implemented in the future.

The proposal was brought up as early as 2003 and discussed in 2005. Route Q2 is one of the most popular routes in the entire system with an average weekday ridership of 10,200 riders.

In later proposals, WMATA proposed to introduce routes Q4 and Q6 to operate alongside route Q2. Route Q4 will operate between Silver Spring and Rockville Metro stations and route Q6 will operate between Shady Grove and Wheaton Metro stations. Performance measures went as the following:

Bus Productivity Measure	June 2009 Productivity	June 2011 Productivity
Daily passengers	10,200	10,400
Passengers per trip	53	54
Cost recovery	36.5%	36.5%
Operating speed	14.4 MPH	+5% savings

Financial impacts to the proposed changes goes as follow:

Item	FY 2010 (6 months) Jan 2010 – Jun 2010	FY 2011 (12 months) July 2010 – Jun 2011
Cost (Savings) to Convert Q2 to Q4 and Q6	($135,000)	($261,900)
Revenue from Ridership Increase	($30,000)	($60,000)
Net Cost (Savings)	($165,000)	($321,900)
Cost for one Service Operations Manager	$40,000	$80,000
Total Net Cost (Savings)	($125,000)	($241,900)

On December 27, 2009, changes were made to the Veirs Mill Road.

Route Q2 kept its same routing, but would only operate during early morning and post PM peak service and discontinue Sunday service. A new route Q1 would operate during early morning and late nights as well but would skip Montgomery College's Rockville campus. A new Q4, Q5, and Q6 were also introduced to operate alongside the Q1 and Q2. Route Q4 would operate between Rockville and Silver Spring Metro stations and routes Q5 and Q6 will operate between Shady Grove and Wheaton Metro stations. Route Q4 would operate daily, route Q5 would skip Montgomery College's Rockville campus and only operating on Sunday, and route Q6 will operate Monday through Saturdays serving Montgomery College's Rockville campus. Additionally, a new limited bus stop route along Veirs Mill Road would be implemented in the new future.

The new line will have a combined frequency of 7–8 minutes during weekday peak hours and 15 minutes during off-peak hours.

=== 2010-2015 ===
When the Paul S. Sarbanes Transit Center at the Silver Spring Metro station opened, routes Q1, Q2, and Q4 were rerouted from their bus stop along Wayne Avenue to Bus Bay 218 at the transit center on the second level sharing the bay with route J5.

In 2015, WMATA proposed to simplify the Veirs Mill Road Line. WMATA proposed to terminate the line at Wheaton Metro station when Metrorail is open and coordinate all routes into two routes. The line will still operate to Silver Spring station only during the early mornings and late nights when Metrorail isn't operating. This will help buses to arrive on time by having them avoid the heavy traffic near the Capital Beltway and simplify the bus service by reducing the number of routes from five to two according to WMATA. Alternative service would be provided by routes Y2, Y7, and Y8.

WMATA also proposed to implement a new limited stop MetroExtra route Q9 between Wheaton and Rockville Metro stations during the weekdays to help relieve crowding.

=== 2016-2025 ===
On June 26, 2016, as part of a pilot program, customers traveling southbound on Q Line buses were able to transfer to Red Line trains at Wheaton station or Forest Glen station and continue southbound to Silver Spring station free of charge using their SmarTrip card. The same thing applies to Northbound service. However, customers choosing the northbound will be charged the regular fare, but will receive a credit for the free Red Line trip applied to their card within three days. The free Red Line trip only applies to customers boarding the Red Line at Silver Spring or Forest Glen stations who then transfer to the Q Line buses at Wheaton northbound and Forest Glen and Silver Spring stations Southbound. Customers traveling outside this area on the Red Line will be charged the regular rail fare.

During WMATA's FY2021 budget year, WMATA proposed to eliminate service between Rockville station and Shady Grove station with all routes terminating at Rockville station and consolidated into route Q4. This was because service is duplicate to both Red Line and Ride On and would cut costs terminating the line at Rockville. According to performance measures, 1,539 weekday riders (24%) would be required to transfer, 861 Saturday riders (18%) would be required to transfer, and 626 Sunday riders (18%) would be required to transfer.

Montgomery County residents expressed concerns over the proposed changes. Many residents voiced their concerns of the proposed changes on economic impacts and proposed loss of service. Members of the Montgomery County Council and state delegation sent a letter to WMATA Chairman Paul Smedberg quoting;

The Metrobus routes currently recommended for service reductions, including the Q, J, L and Z bus lines, provide transportation for many of our most transit-dependent residents," the lawmakers wrote. "Service reductions will disproportionately affect students commuting to Montgomery College, seniors running daily errands and service workers accessing jobs. Roughly 65,000 Montgomery riders use Metrobus on a daily basis, and for many these bus routes are their only source of transportation.

Tom Hucker stated:

The WMATA General Manager's proposed bus cuts would have a severe negative impact on riders, and we want to make sure residents have their voice heard before the board makes their decision on the proposal

At least 30 Montgomery County leaders called on WMATA not to cut Metrobus routes in the region, saying it will "disproportionately affect" students, seniors, and service workers with no other source of transportation. The letter's signatories include state senators Craig Zucker, Susan Lee, and Cheryl Kagan, Maryland State Delegates Marc Korman, Sara Love, and Julie Palakovich Carr and all nine members of the county council. In the letter to Metro Chairman Paul Smedberg, members of the Montgomery County Council and state delegation said they opposed the cuts, which are part of WMATA's proposed FY 2021 operating budget, and urged the agency to prioritize "maintaining frequent and reliable service."

According to 343 voters to the line, 21% of voters were in favor of the changes, 60% were against the changes, and 19% were undecided. Most of the responses were concerns of passengers trips becoming longer and not wanting to transfer to other buses. On April 2, 2020, WMATA would back out of the proposal due to the major customer and political pushback.

During the COVID-19 pandemic, the line was reduced to operate on its Saturday supplemental schedule beginning on March 16, 2020. However beginning on March 18, 2020, the line was further reduced to operate on its Sunday schedule with routes Q2 and Q6 being suspended and replaced by routes Q1 and Q5. Weekend service was also suspended beginning on March 21, 2020. The line restored its weekday schedule beginning on August 23, 2020. However, route Q2 and Q6 Saturday schedule remained suspended.

On September 26, 2020, WMATA proposed to eliminate all route Q2 and Q6 Saturday service and replace them with routes Q1 and Q5 full time. They also will eliminate the Q5 weekday trips and reduce service due to low federal funding. Routes Q2 and Q6 has not operated on Saturdays since March 14, 2020 due to Metro's response to the COVID-19 pandemic. However, on September 5, 2021, all Q2 and Q6 Saturday service was restored.

On June 25, 2023, all Q1 trips was changed to Q2 trips and all Q5 trips was changed to Q6 trips, with Q2 and Q6 trips continuing to bypass Montgomery College before 6 AM and after 10 PM Monday-Saturday, and all day on Sundays.

=== Better Bus Redesign ===
In 2022, WMATA launched its Better Bus Redesign project, which aimed to redesign the entire Metrobus Network and is the first full redesign of the agency's bus network in its history.

In April 2023, WMATA launched its Draft Visionary Network. As part of the drafts, WMATA renamed the Veirs Mill Road Line to Route MD141 in the drafts. The route would run the current Route Q2 regular routing between Silver Spring station and Shady Grove station via Montgomery College.

During WMATA's Revised Draft Visionary Network, WMATA renamed Route MD141 to Route M10 and would operate the route between Wheaton station and Montgomery College only. Service between Silver Spring station and Wheaton station would be taken over by Route M20 while service between Montgomery College and Shady Grove would be fully taken over by Ride On Route 55. WMATA also introduced a proposed Route M1X which would operate limited stop express service between Wheaton station and Montgomery College, supplementing the proposed Route M10. All changes were then proposed during WMATA's 2025 Proposed Network.

During the 2025 Proposed Network, WMATA dropped the M1X proposal in favor of the planned bus rapid transit Ride On Flash service along Veirs Mill Road. WMATA also proposed to transfer Route M10 to Ride On and have them operate the route to maximize bus resources. The proposed transfer would keep the proposed Route M10 routing.

On November 21, 2024, WMATA approved its Better Bus Redesign Network.

In February 2025, Ride On proposed to name the M10 to Route 40, and would operate between Wheaton station and Montgomery College via Veirs Mill Road. The route was ultimately approved by Montgomery County.

Beginning on June 29, 2025, routes Q2, Q4, and Q6 were transferred to Ride On and were renamed to Route 40, shortening the routes between Wheaton Metro station and Montgomery College's Rockville campus, with early morning, late evening and all Sunday service operating between Wheaton and Rockville Metro stations only. The service between Shady Grove Metro station and Montgomery College's Rockville campus was taken over by Ride On route 55 while the service between Wheaton and Silver Spring Metro stations was replaced by route M20.

While diminished, the line reflects the general route of the planned Ride On's Flash BRT service, further enhancing a service with modernized stations and faster headways.
