= Georgia Avenue–Silver Spring Line =

M20
- Georgia Avenue–Silver Spring Line

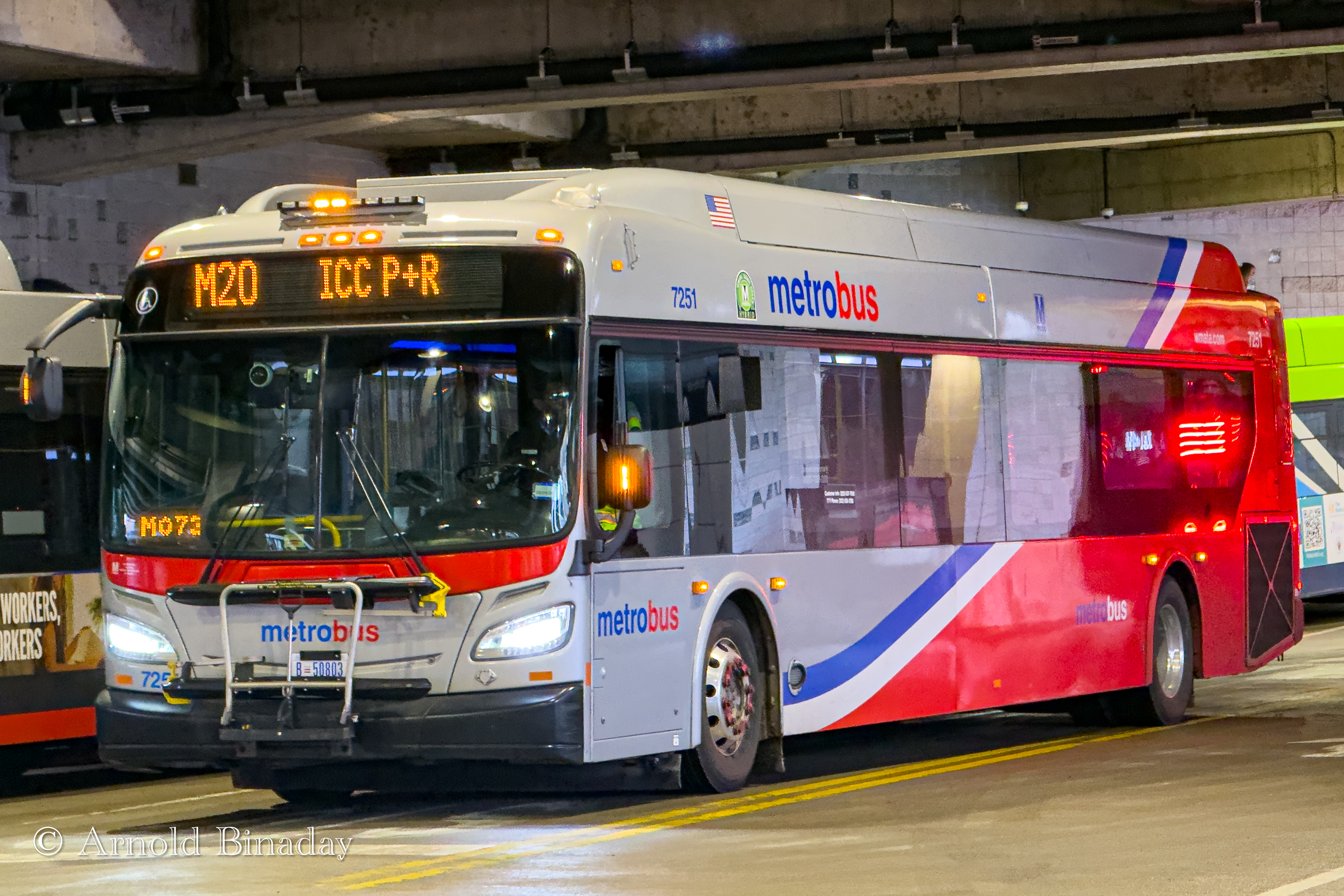
- Route M20 at Silver Spring station

Overview
- System: Metrobus
- Operator: Washington Metropolitan Area Transit Authority
- Garage: Montgomery
- Livery: Local
- Status: In Service
- Began service: Y2, Y7, Y8: 1970s M20: June 29, 2025
- Ended service: Y2, Y7, Y8: June 28, 2025

Route
- Locale: Montgomery County
- Communities served: Silver Spring, Forest Glen, Wheaton, Glenmont, Aspen Hill, Olney
- Landmarks served: ICC Park & Ride Lot (Select weekday trips only), Glenmont station (Select weekday trips only), Wheaton station, Westfield Wheaton, Forest Glen station, Paul S. Sarbanes Transit Center (Silver Spring station)
- Start: ICC Park & Ride Lot (Select weekday trips only); Wheaton station
- Via: Georgia Avenue
- End: Silver Spring station
- Length: 60 Minutes

Service
- Level: Daily
- Frequency: 7-30 minutes (varies based on time of day)
- Operates: 4:15 AM - 1:00 AM (Monday-Friday); 4:35 AM - 2:00 AM (Saturday); 5:05 AM - 12:50 AM (Sunday)
- Ridership: 838,749 (Y2, FY 2025); 763,952 (Y7, FY 2025); 835,583 (Y8, FY 2025)
- Transfers: SmarTrip only
- Timetable: Georgia Avenue-Maryland Line

The Georgia Avenue–Silver Spring Line, designated Route M20, is a daily bus route operated by the Washington Metropolitan Area Transit Authority between Silver Spring station and Wheaton Station of the Red Line of the Washington Metro, with select weekday trips extending to the ICC Park & Ride Lot. The line operates every 7–20 minutes during the weekday peak hour, 12 minutes on weekday evenings and during the day on weekends, and 30 minutes during late nights. Trips are roughly 65 minutes long. This route provides service along Georgia Avenue in Maryland providing service to multiple communities.

== Background ==
Routes M20 operates along Georgia Avenue providing service between Silver Spring Station and Wheaton Station, with some weekday trips extended to serve Glenmont Station and the ICC Park & Ride Lot. All Service to Leisure World and MedStar Montgomery Medical Center, as well as all weekend service to Glenmont Station has been replaced by route M22, which operates between Bethesda Station and Olney.

Routes M20 operates out of Montgomery division. It often uses articulated buses due to its high ridership volume.

=== Route Stops ===
Bus stop	Direction	Connections
Montgomery County, Maryland
Silver Spring station Bus Bay 219	Northbound station, Southbound terminal	Metrobus: C87, D40, D4X, D60, D6X, M52, M54, M70, P30; Ride On: 1, 2, 4, 5, 8, 9, 11, 12, 13, 14, 15, 16, 17, 18, 19, 20, 21, 22, 28, Flash BRT (Blue, Orange); MTA Maryland Bus: 915, 929; Shuttle-UM: 111; Peter Pan Bus; Washington Metro: MARC: Brunswick Line; MTA: Purple Line (Planned)
Georgia Avenue / Ellsworth Drive	Northbound	Metrobus: P30; Ride On: 12, 13, 14, 16, 17, 20
Wayne Avenue / Dixon Avenue	Southbound	Metrobus: D40
Georgia Avenue / Colesville Road	Southbound	Ride On: 8, 21, 22
Georgia Avenue / Cameron Street	Bidirectional	Ride On: 28
Georgia Avenue / Spring Street	Bidirectional	
Georgia Avenue / Noyes Drive	Bidirectional	
Georgia Avenue / Highland Drive	Bidirectional	
Georgia Avenue / Luzerne Avenue	Bidirectional	
Georgia Avenue / Seminary Place	Bidirectional	
Georgia Avenue / Forest Glen Road Forest Glen station	Bidirectional	Ride On: 7, 8 Washington Metro:
Georgia Avenue / Belvedere Boulevard	Bidirectional	
Georgia Avenue / August Drive	Northbound	
Georgia Avenue / Dexter Avenue	Southbound	
Georgia Avenue / Dennis Avenue	Bidirectional	
Georgia Avenue / Evans Parkway	Northbound	
Georgia Avenue / Evans Drive	Southbound	
Georgia Avenue / Plyers Mill Road	Bidirectional	Ride On: 37
Georgia Avenue / Windham Lane	Bidirectional	Ride On: 37
Georgia Avenue / Veirs Mill Road	Southbound	Ride On: 37
Wheaton Station Bus Bays A and E	Bidirectional	Ride On: 7, 8, 9, 31, 34, 37, 38, 40, 41, 48; Metrobus: M12, M22; Washington Metro:
Veirs Mill Road / University Boulevard	Northbound	Metrobus: M12, M22; Ride On: 8 (Northbound Only), 9 (Northbound only), 34, 38, 40, 48
Georgia Avenue / Reedie Drive	Southbound	Metrobus: M22
Georgia Avenue / Ennalls Avenue	Southbound	Metrobus: M22
Grandview Avenue / University Boulevard	Northbound	Metrobus: M22
Georgia Avenue / University Boulevard	Southbound	Metrobus: M22
Georgia Avenue / Blueridge Avenue	Bidirectional	Metrobus: M22
Georgia Avenue / Dawson Avenue	Bidirectional	Metrobus: M22
Georgia Avenue / Arcola Avenue	Bidirectional	Metrobus: M22
Georgia Avenue / Henderson Avenue	Bidirectional	Metrobus: M22
Georgia Avenue / Weisman Road	Southbound	Metrobus: M22
Georgia Avenue / Shorefield Road	Northbound	Metrobus: M22
Georgia Avenue / Mason Street	Bidirectional	Metrobus: M22
Georgia Avenue / Randolph Road	Northbound	Metrobus: M22, M42, M44; Ride On: 10
Georgia Avenue / Judson Road	Southbound	Metrobus: M22, M42, M44; Ride On: 10
Glenmont Station Bus Bays D and H	Bidirectional	Metrobus: M22, M42, M44; Ride On: 26, 31, 33, 39, 41, 49, 51, 53; Washington Metro:
Georgia Avenue / Epping Road	Bidirectional	Metrobus: M22; Ride On: 41, 51
Georgia Avenue / Hathaway Drive	Bidirectional	Metrobus: M22; Ride On: 51
Georgia Avenue / Janet Road	Bidirectional	Metrobus: M22; Ride On: 51
Georgia Avenue / Kayson Street	Bidirectional	Metrobus: M22; Ride On: 51
Georgia Avenue / Rippling Brook Drive	Northbound	Metrobus: M22; Ride On: 51
Georgia Avenue / May Street	Southbound	Metrobus: M22; Ride On: 51
Georgia Avenue / Verona Drive	Bidirectional	Metrobus: M22; Ride On: 51
Georgia Avenue / Hewitt Avenue	Bidirectional	Metrobus: M22; Ride On: 51
Georgia Avenue / Wendy Lane	Bidirectional	Metrobus: M22
Georgia Avenue / Aspen Hill Road	Bidirectional	Metrobus: M22
Georgia Avenue / Connecticut Avenue	Bidirectional	Metrobus: M22; Ride On: 26, 34, 41
Georgia Avenue / Heathfield Road	Southbound	Metrobus: M22
Georgia Avenue / Postgate Terrace	Northbound	Metrobus: M22
Georgia Avenue / Bel Pre Road	Bidirectional	Metrobus: M22; Ride On: 49
Georgia Avenue / Bel Pre Road	Bidirectional	Metrobus: M22; Ride On: 49
Georgia Avenue / Georgian Colonies	Bidirectional	Metrobus: M22
Georgia Avenue / Rossmoor Boulevard	Bidirectional	Metrobus: M22
Georgia Avenue / International Drive	Bidirectional	Metrobus: M22
Georgia Avenue / Norbeck Road	Bidirectional	Metrobus: M22; Ride On: 52
Georgia Avenue / Norbeck Road	Northbound	Metrobus: M22; Ride On: 52
Georgia Avenue-ICC Park & Ride Lot / Bus Bay Shelter	Southbound station, Northbound terminal	Ride On: 51, 53; MTA Maryland Bus: 201, 204

== History ==
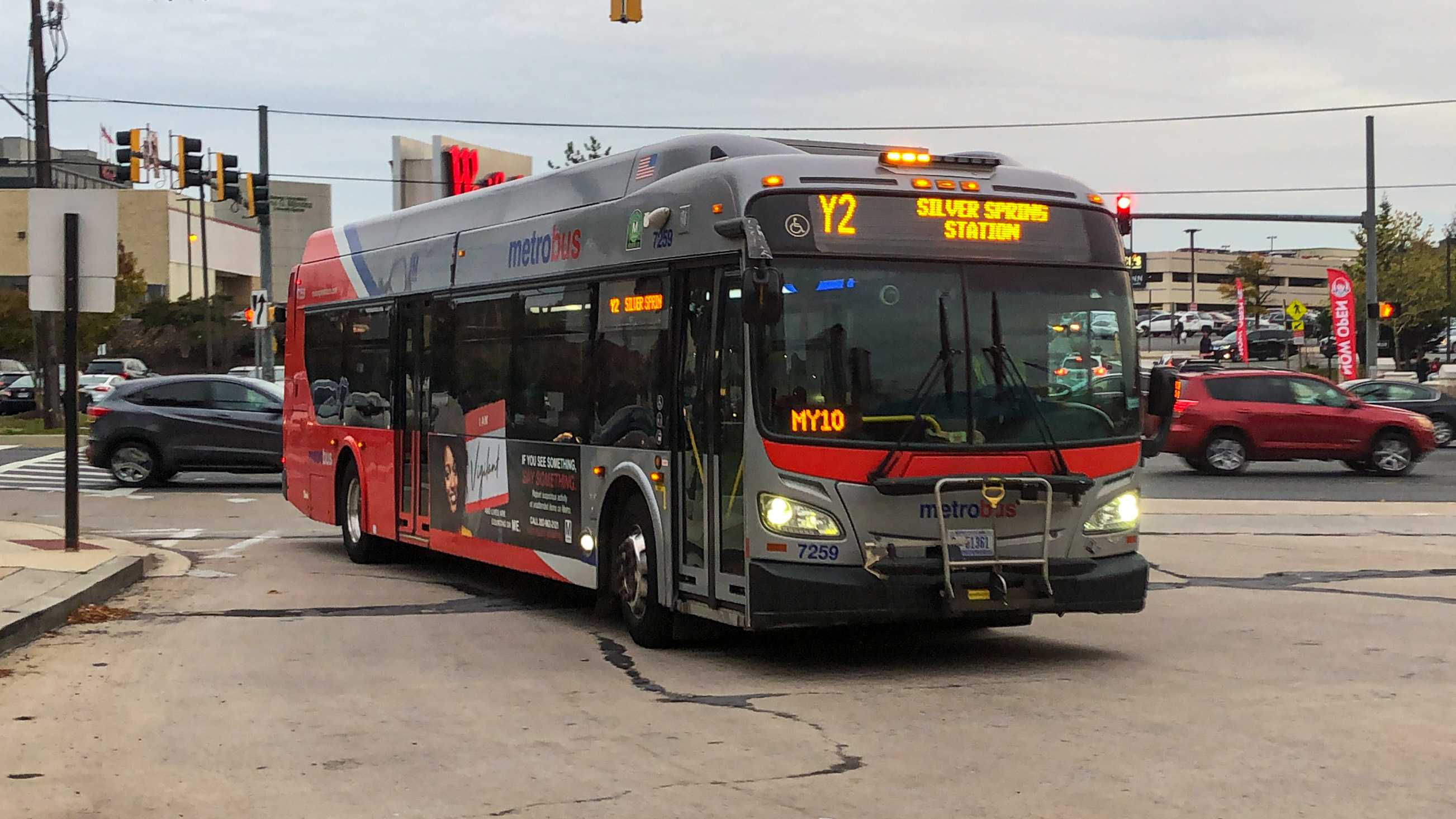
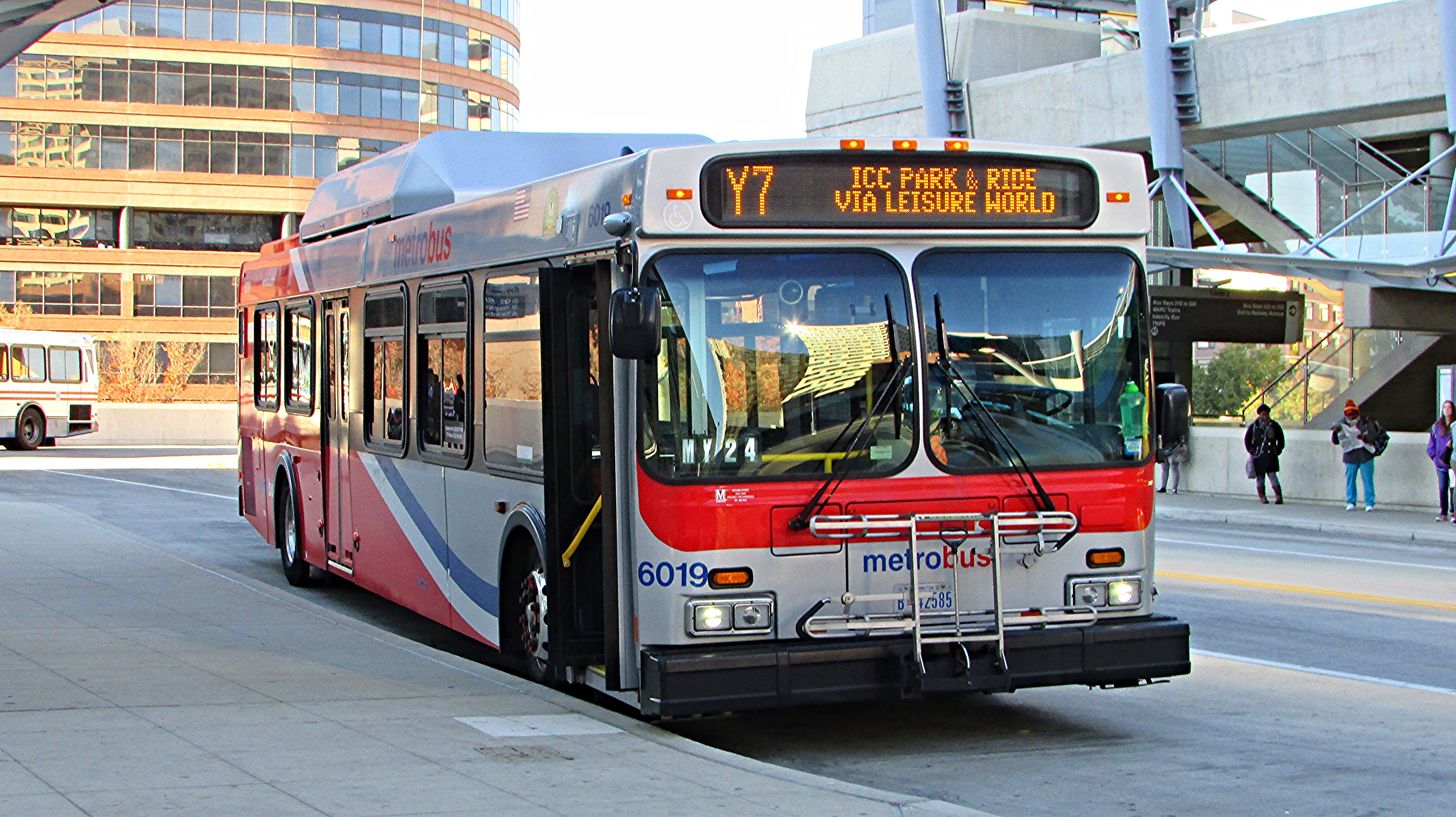
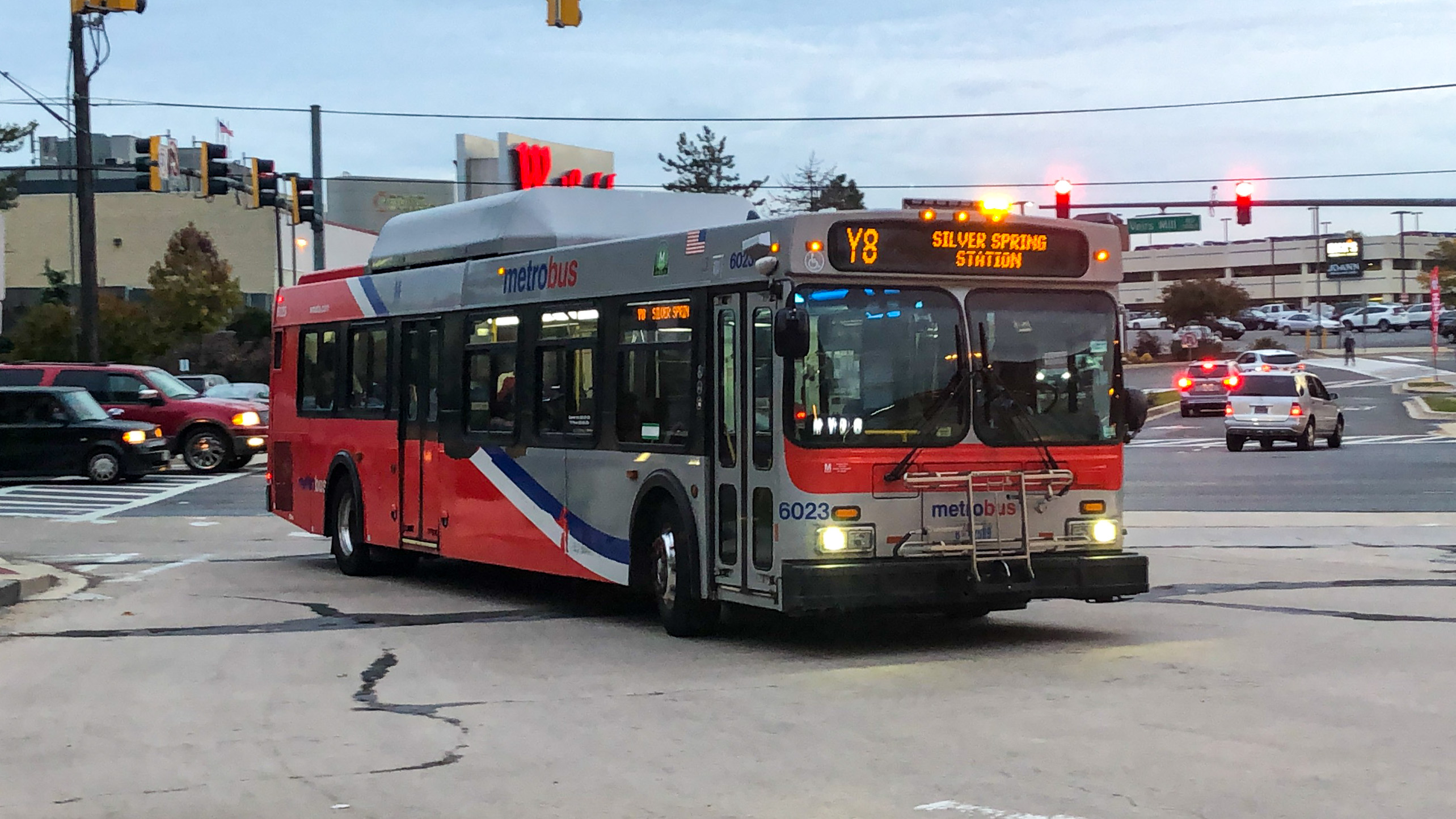
Former Routes Y2, Y7 and Y8

The line originally operated under former streetcar lines prior to becoming buses in 1973. During Metro's inception, routes Y2 and Y4 operated between Silver Spring station and Kensington before being replaced by Ride On through the 1980s-1990s. Then route Y4 operated between Rockville and Glenmont station before being replaced by Ride On route 49 in 1998. Route Y1 operated between Montgomery Village and Potomac Park. Route Y3 originally operated between Leisure World and Southwest Mall, then became a part of the Homecrest-Wheaton Line. Both the Y1 and Y3 were later discontinued around the 1990s and replaced by Ride On routes.

The original Georgia Avenue–Maryland Line operated as routes Y5, Y6, Y7, Y8, and Y9. At one point during its inception, route Y5 would operate between Leisure World to Federal Triangle, then operate as part of the Norbeck–Wheaton Line until the 1990s when it was replaced by Ride On route 48. Route Y5 would later join the Georgia Avenue–Maryland Line. Route Y6 operated between Glenmont and Wheaton before being extended to Aspen Hill. Route Y7 would operate between Montgomery Village and Southwest Mall. Routes Y8 and Y9 would only operate between MedStar Montgomery Medical Center and Silver Spring. All routes would primarily operate along Georgia Avenue.

During the 1980 to 1990s, routes Y5, and Y7 were rerouted to operate with routes Y8 and Y9 MedStar Montgomery Hospital and Silver Spring. Y6 would also join the line but would keep its same routing between Glenmont and Aspen Hill.

In the 1990s, route Y6 was renamed route Q3 which would operate on its same routing. The route was later replaced by Ride On route 41 in 1998.

Y5 was also eliminated and replaced by routes Y7, Y8, and Y9.

Since the 1990s, the Georgia Avenue–Maryland Line operates as the following:

- Y7: Rockville station to Silver Spring station via the Norbeck Park and Ride. Trips to Rockville are only served during peak hours.
- Y8: Montgomery General Hospital to Silver Spring via Leisure World only.
- Y9: Montgomery General Hospital to Wheaton as a direct route.

On June 29, 2003, WMATA made changes to the line where all trips will operate between Montgomery General Hospital and Silver Spring station. Trips passing Leisure World Clubhouse were named route Y9 while trips serving the clubhouse were named route Y8. The Norbeck Park & Ride Lot will be served directly only by southbound trips in the morning rush and by northbound trips in the afternoon rush as route Y7 which was extended to the Montgomery General Hospital. Route Y7 trips to Rockville station were eliminated with all trips terminating at the Norbeck Park and Ride lot.

At the time, routes Y7 and Y9 did not serve Silver Spring station making route Y8 the only route to serve Silver Spring. Route Y7 and Y8 operate daily while route Y9 operated during the weekday peak hours only.

On September 7, 2003, Leisure World Clubhouse requested that on weekdays, the number of trips diverting off of Georgia Avenue to serve clubhouse directly be significantly reduced. Route Y8 trips not diverting into the clubhouse were named route Y9 and half of Y7 trips will no longer serve the clubhouse. Existing route Y7 trips serving the clubhouse were named route Y5. The changes goes as follows:

- All Y5 and Y7 trips will serve the Norbeck Park & Ride Lot.
- All Y5 and Y8 trips will serve Leisure World
- All Y8 trips will serve Leisure World, but not the Norbeck Park & Ride Lot
- All Y9 trips will serve neither. The times that most weekday trips pass stops south of Leisure World will not change.

On December 18, 2011, new service was added to the new Intercounty Connector Park and Ride Lot off Georgia Avenue. Routes Y5 and Y7 would enter the Park and Ride in order for passengers to transfer to MTA Maryland 201 and 202. Service to the Norbeck Park & Ride Lot was discontinued.

Between 2011 and 2012, WMATA released a study on the Y lines. At the time, the Y line was suffering from insufficient run time, inconvenient service frequencies, and operational issues the line has. Proposals were to simplify the line, add time to schedule buses, combine bus stops together, improve amenities at bus stops, and convert route Y9 as a MetroExtra route. These changes will go under short to long term plans.

At the time of the study, frequencies goes as the following:

- Y5: Weekday Peak Hour service (AM to Silver Spring, PM to Olney) and Sunday service only.
- Y7: Weekday Peak Hour service (AM to Silver Spring, PM to Olney) and late night Saturday service only.
- Y8: Daily (except service in the Weekday Peak direction). Most Saturday service only operates between SIlver Spring and Leisure World.
- Y9: Daily direct between Silver Spring and Olney. Most Sunday trips only operates between Medstar Montgomery Medical Center and Wheaton station.

=== Simplification ===
On August 24, 2014, routes Y5 and Y9 were discontinued by WMATA and replaced by routes Y7 and Y8 in order to simplify the Georgia Avenue–Maryland Line. Route Y7 would also be shortened and rerouted to Georgia Ave–ICC Park & Ride Lot instead of MedStar Hospital while route Y8 would discontinue service to the Leisure World clubhouse remaining straight along Georgia Avenue. During the weekends, route Y7 would only operate between Leisure World clubhouse and Wheaton station.

==== Temporary Y4 ====
Between October 14, 2014 and December 12, 2014, a temporary route Y4 was introduced as the Leisure World–Olney Line running on weekdays between 8:00 AM and 3:00 PM in order to provide residents access to the Leisure World clubhouse from Olney. This was because residents lost direct access to the clubhouse on August 24, 2014 when the Y8 became a direct route. Passengers would have to walk from the clubhouse onto Georgia Avenue to take the Y8 instead of waiting at the bus stops as the Y7 would take them to Silver Spring or up to the Georgia Ave–ICC Park & Ride Lot on weekdays only.

==== December 2014 Changes ====
On December 14, 2014, a new route Y2 was introduced to operate a direct routing between MedStar Montgomery Medical Center and Silver Spring station which was the Y8 routing and former Y9 routing. Route Y8 was also rerouted back to the Leisure World clubhouse but discontinued all weekend service. Route Y4 was also discontinued as there was no need for the route to operate anymore as the Y8 covered the same routing. These changes were all towards customer feedback and frustration due to the August 24 changes.

=== Later Changes ===
When the Paul S. Sarbanes Transit Center at Silver Spring station opened, routes Y2, Y7, and Y8 were rerouted from its terminus along Wayne Avenue to the new transit center. The Y2, Y7, and Y8 were assigned to Bus Bay 219 on level 2.

On June 25, 2017, weekend route Y8 service was restored, operating its full route. Route Y7 also discontinued weekend service on the same day being replaced by routes Y2 and Y8. This gives residents from Olney weekend service to the Leisure World clubhouse which has not happened since the 2014 changes.

On December 17, 2017, northbound buses that departed from Wheaton station will operate via Veirs Mill Road, University Boulevard, Grandview Avenue, and Blueridge Avenue to access Georgia Avenue due to the closure of Reedie Drive. Northbound service on Reedie Drive and Georgia Avenue between Reedie Drive and Blueridge Avenue will be eliminated.

During the COVID-19 pandemic, all Route Y7 service was suspended and Routes Y2 and Y8 were reduced to operate on its Saturday supplemental schedule beginning on March 16, 2020. However beginning on March 18, 2020, the line was further reduced to operate on its Sunday schedule. Weekend service was also suspended on the Y8 beginning on March 21, 2020, with Route Y2 operating every 30 minutes in its place. The line restored its full schedule beginning on August 23, 2020 with the Y7 also returning to service.

On September 5, 2021, the line's frequency was improved to operate every 20 minutes.

In 2024 during WMATA's FY2024 Budget crisis, WMATA proposed to eliminate all service after midnight daily. However on April 25, 2024, Metro’s Board of Directors approved a $4.8 billion capital and operating budget which avoided service cuts.

=== Better Bus Redesign ===
In 2022, WMATA launched its Better Bus Redesign project, which aimed to redesign the entire Metrobus Network and is the first full redesign of the agency's bus network in its history.

In April 2023, WMATA launched its Draft Visionary Network. As part of the drafts, WMATA proposed to reroute the terminus from Silver Spring station to Bethesda station. The line would run on Route Y8's routing between MedStar Montgomery Medical Center in Olney to Wheaton station, but would be changed to also operate inside the Georgia Avenue–ICC Park & Ride Lot, and then be partially combined with the current Route Y8 and operate via University Boulevard, Connecticut Avenue, and East-West Highway to Bethesda station, and was named Route MD142 in the proposals. Service between Wheaton station and Silver Spring station was taken over by the proposed Route MD141, which is the current routing of Route Q2.

During WMATA's Revised Draft Visionary Network, WMATA renamed the MD142 to Route M22 and kept its proposed routing, with additional short trips operating between Wheaton station and the Georgia Avenue-ICC Park & Ride Lot. The Route MD141 segment between Wheaton station and Silver Spring station was also retained and renamed to Route M20, and would only operate between the two points. All changes were then proposed during WMATA's 2025 Proposed Network.

During the 2025 Proposed Network proposals, the line was changed again, where the proposed Route M20 would follow the current Y7 routing and operate to the Georgia Avenue–ICC Park & Ride Lot while skipping the Leisure World Clubhouse. The line would operate short trips between Silver Spring station and Wheaton station on weekdays, and all day on weekends, with service north of Wheaton station replaced by Route M22. Route M22 would also not serve the Georgia Avenue–ICC Park & Ride Lot as the proposed Route M20 would serve the Park & Ride instead.

On November 21, 2024, WMATA approved its Better Bus Redesign Network.

Beginning on June 29, 2025, Route Y7 was renamed to the M20, keeping its same routing except that the route would bypass the Leisure World Clubhouse. Route M20 would also operate short trips between Silver Spring and Wheaton stations on weekdays and all day on weekends. Route Y2 was discontinued, and the Y8 was partially combined with the L8 and renamed to the M22. The new M22 follows the same routing as the Y8 between Olney and Wheaton, then deviates along University Boulevard and follows the L8 routing along Connecticut Avenue before turning onto East-West Highway and serving Bethesda station. Late-night service only operates between Olney and Wheaton station.
