= Flash BRT =

Bus rapid transit network in Montgomery County, Maryland, US

Overview
- Owner: Ride On
- Locale: Montgomery County, Maryland
- Transit type: Bus rapid transit
- Number of lines: 1 operational and 7 under development
- Number of stations: 14 (operational); ~45 (overall)
- Headquarters: Rockville, Maryland
- Website: www.ridetheflash.com

Operation
- Began operation: October 14, 2020 (US 29 only)
- Operator: Ride On
- Number of vehicles: 19

Technical
- System length: 14 mi (23 km) on US 29

Flash is a bus rapid transit network in Montgomery County, Maryland, with currently one corridor in operation and seven future corridors development. It is part of Montgomery County's Ride On bus system.

== Corridors ==
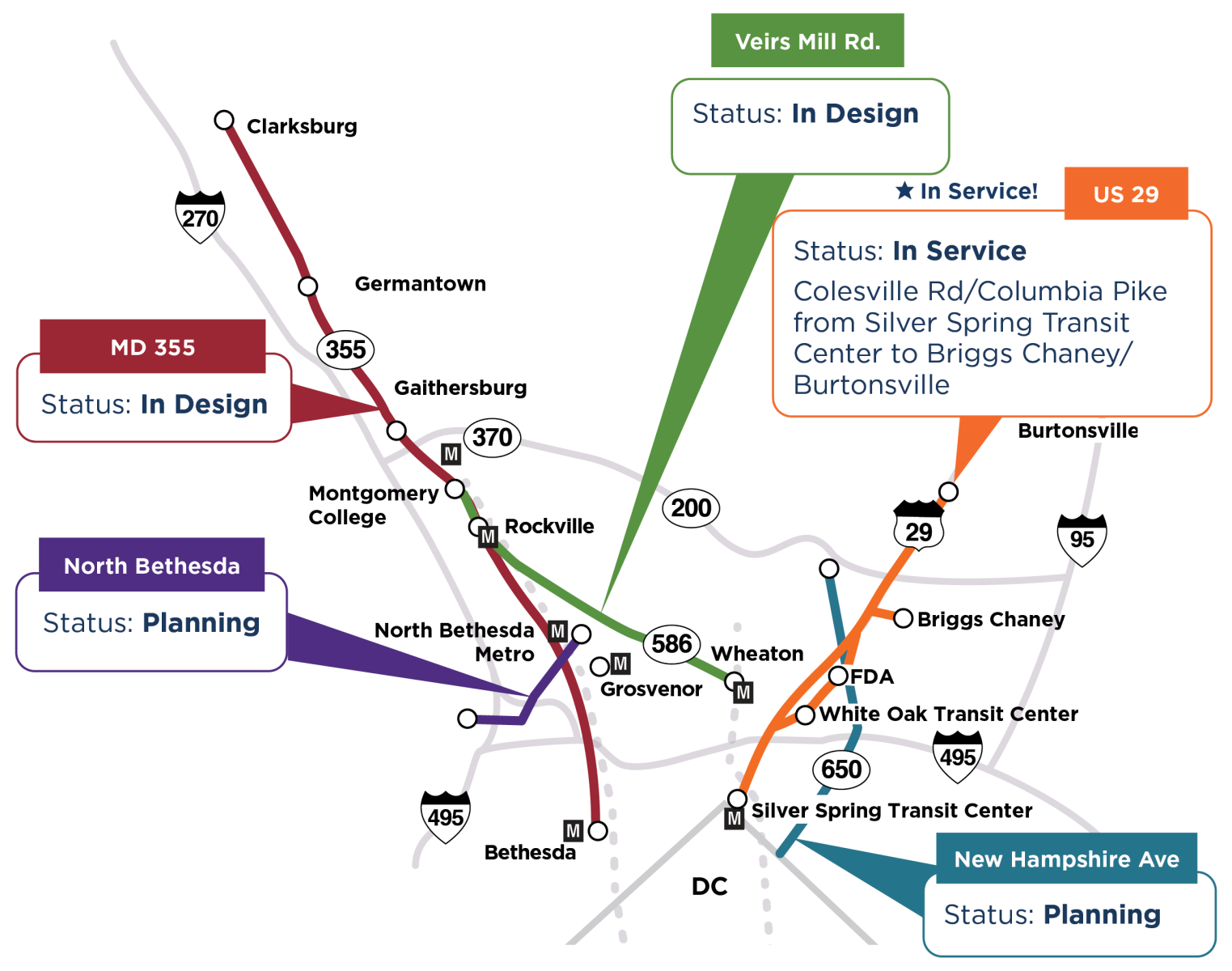
Existing and planned corridors

=== US 29 corridor ===
In the corridor which is currently in operation, the Flash BRT service has two routes designated as Blue and Orange running along U.S. Route 29 in Maryland, both beginning at the Silver Spring Metro station and extending northeast. Route Blue has 10 total bus stops, ending at the Mall in Columbia. Route Orange has 11 total bus stops, ending at Briggs Chaney Park and Ride.

The two routes designated as Blue and Orange started on October 14, 2020, replacing Ride On route 129 and Metrobus route Z11. All the buses go along the shoulder of US 29 along the northern end of the route, with the remainder of the service using mixed-traffic roadways. The buses receive signal priority at some intersections.

Stations serving the US 29 corridor
| Station/stop name | Location | Connections | Facilities |
|---|---|---|---|
| Silver Spring | Bus Bay 229; 8400 Colesville Rd; Silver Spring, MD 20910 | Washington Metro: Red Line; MARC: Brunswick Line; Purple Line (under construction); Metrobus: C87, D40, D4X, D60, D6X, M20, M52, M54, M70, P30; Ride On: 1, 2, 4, 5, 8, 9, 11, 12, 13, 14, 15, 16, 17, 18, 19, 20, 21, 22, 28; MTA Maryland Bus: 915, 929; Shuttle–UM: 111 | Transit center; Capital Bikeshare |
| Fenton Street | Colesville Rd & Fenton St; Silver Spring, MD 20910 | Metrobus: M52, M54 and P30; Ride On: 8, 9, 12, 13, 14, 16, 17, 20, 21, 22, 28; MTA Maryland Bus: 305, 315, 325 | Capital Bikeshare |
| Four Corners | NB: Colesville Rd & Lanark Way; SB: Colesville Rd & University Blvd; Silver Spring, MD 20901 | Metrobus: M12, M52, M54; Ride On: 9, 19, 21 | |
| Burnt Mills | Burnt Mills Shopping Center; Silver Spring, MD 20901 | Metrobus: M52, M54; Ride On: 21, 22 | Capital Bikeshare |
| Oak Leaf Drive | NB: Lockwood Dr & Northwest Dr; SB: Lockwood Dr & Oak Leaf Dr; Silver Spring, MD 20901 | Metrobus: M52, M54 | Capital Bikeshare |
| FDA | Northwest Loop Rd; White Oak, MD 20903 | Metrobus: M6X; MTA Maryland Bus: 203, 204 | |
| White Oak Transit Center | Lockwood Dr north of New Hampshire Ave; White Oak, MD 20904 | Metrobus: M42, M52, M54, M60 | Capital Bikeshare |
| April Lane | Stewart Ln & April Ln; White Oak, MD 20904 | Metrobus: M42, M52, M54, M60 | Capital Bikeshare |
| Tech Road | Columbia Pk & Tech Rd; Silver Spring, MD 20904 | Metrobus: M42, M44, M52, M54 | 130 parking spaces |
| Castle Boulevard | Castle Blvd & Castle Ridge Cir; Silver Spring, MD 20904 | Metrobus: M52 | Capital Bikeshare |
| Briggs Chaney | Gateshed Manor Way & Briggs Chaney Rd; Silver Spring, MD 20904 | Metrobus: M52; Ride On: 21, 39 | Capital Bikeshare; 240 parking spaces; Public restrooms |
| Burtonsville | National Dr & US 29; Burtonsville, MD 20866 | Metrobus: M52; MTA Maryland Bus: 201, 202, 203, 305, 315 | Bus loop/drop off; >500 parking spaces |
| Maple Lawn Boulevard | East Market Place Columbia, MD 21044 | | 4 parking spaces |
| Johns Hopkins Road | Johns Hopkins University Applied Physics Laboratory (APL) Columbia, MD 21044 | | 6,682 parking spaces |
| Little Patuxent Parkway | Little Patuxent Pkwy & Corporate Center Way Columbia, MD 21044 | | Capital Bikeshare |
| Merriweather Drive | Downtown Columbia / Merriweather Post Pavilion area Columbia, MD 21044 | | 1,350 to 1,700 parking spaces |

=== Veirs Mill Road (MD 586) corridor ===
Scheduled to open circa 2028, the Veirs Mill Road (MD 586) corridor is planned to run along Veirs Mill Road between Wheaton Metrorail station and Montgomery College's Rockville campus. This corridor will use hydrogen cell buses.

=== MD 355 corridor ===
Scheduled to open circa 2029, the MD 355 corridor is planned to begin at Friendship Heights Metrorail station and run northwest along Maryland Route 355 through Rockville, Gaithersburg, and Germantown and end at Clarksburg Outlets.

=== North Bethesda corridor ===
This proposed route would run from North Bethesda Metrorail station to Montgomery Mall. Early planning work is under way as of 2023 but an opening date has not been announced yet.

=== New Hampshire Avenue (MD 650) corridor ===
This proposed route would run along New Hampshire Avenue between Fort Totten Metrorail station and Colesville Park and Ride. Early planning work is under way as of 2023 but an opening date has not been announced yet.

=== Randolph Road corridor ===
This proposed route would run along Randolph Road between North Bethesda Metrorail station and Adventist HealthCare White Oak Medical Center. Early planning work was under way as of 2023 but an opening date has not been announced yet.

=== Georgia Avenue corridor ===
This proposed route would run along Georgia Avenue between MedStar Montgomery Medical Center, formerly Montgomery General Hospital, and Montgomery College's Silver Spring/Takoma Park campus. Early planning work was under way as of 2023 but an opening date has not been announced yet.

=== University Boulevard (MD 193) corridor ===
This proposed route would run along University Boulevard between Wheaton Metrorail station and Takoma Langley Crossroads Transit Center. Early planning work was under way as of 2023 but an opening date has not been announced yet.

== Buses ==
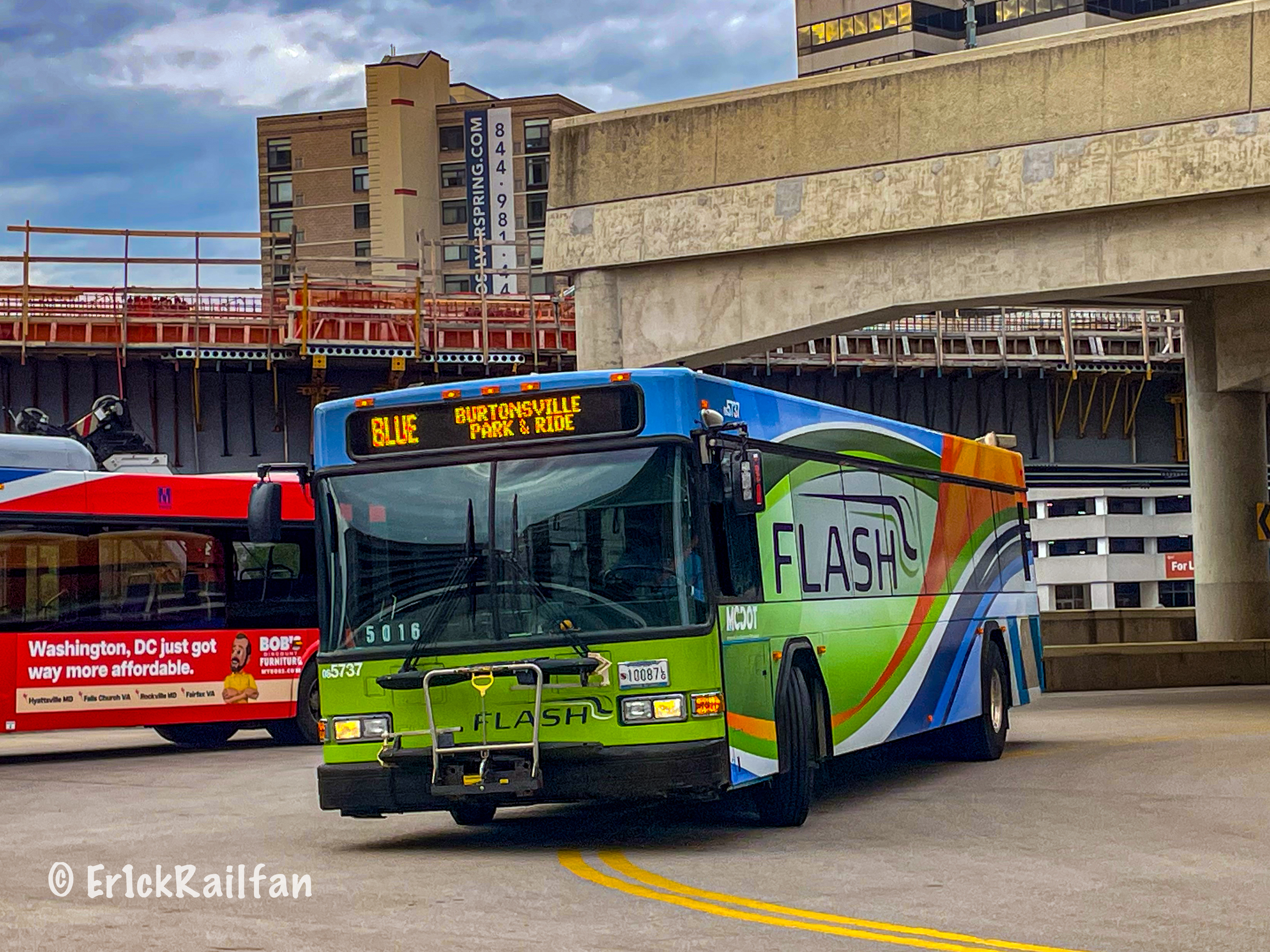
Gillig LF40 diesel bus

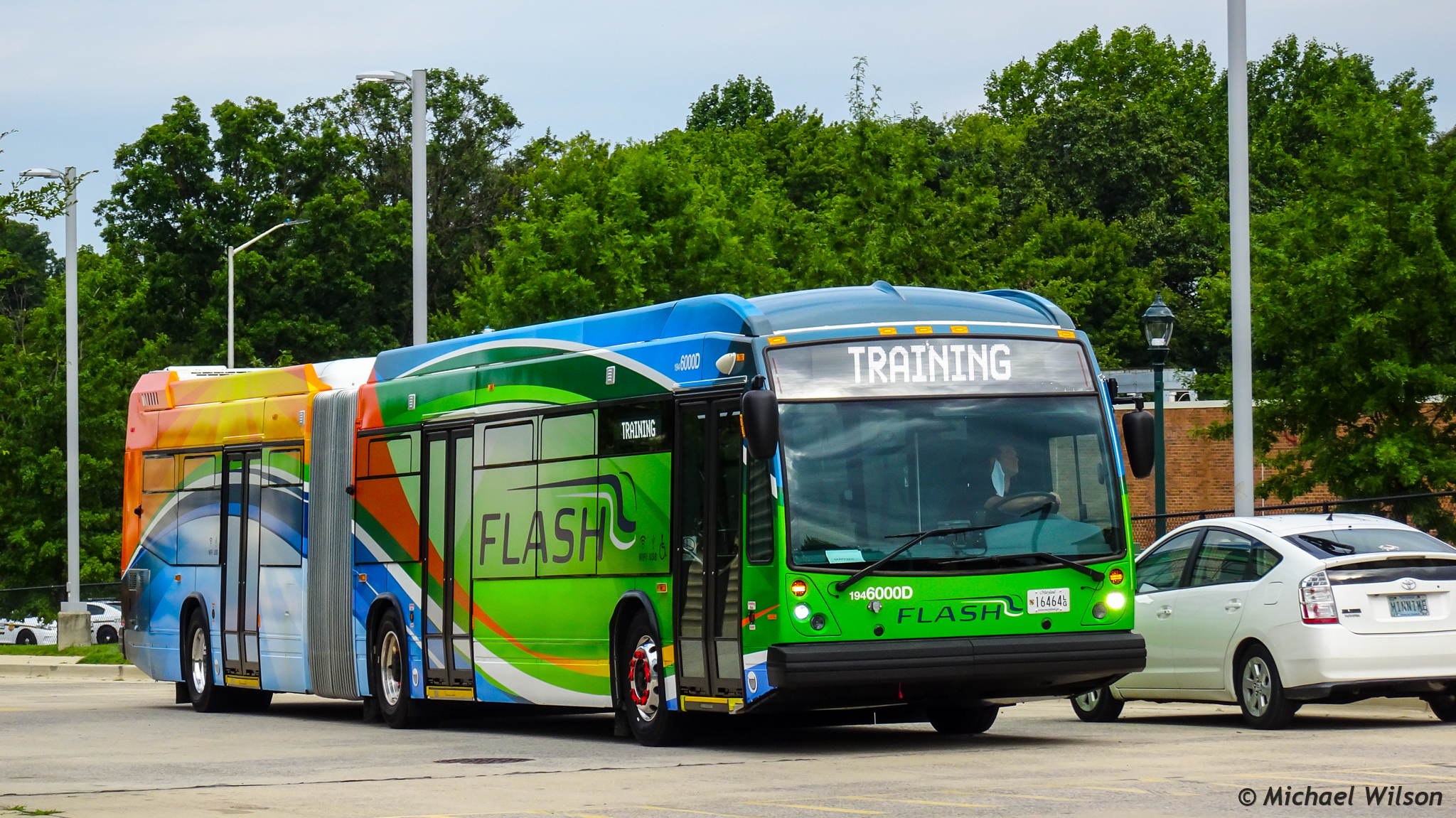
Nova Bus LFS articulated bus

The Montgomery Country Department of Transportation purchased 16 Nova Bus LFS articulated buses (46000D–46015D) for the US 29 corridor, which are based out of the Gaithersburg garage. These buses can fit up to 80 passengers and feature level boarding, onboard bike racks, and an automatic wheelchair securement system. The buses are also equipped with a pedestrian sensor, which alerts the driver when people are passing in front of the bus. Each bus has a free Wi-Fi hotspot, digital interior signage, and USB-A charging ports. Passengers can board or exit the buses through any of their three doors.

Flash also uses 3 of Ride On's 2008 40-foot (12 m) Gillig Low Floor diesel buses (5737, 5744, and 5746) and 4 of Ride On’s 2026 40-foot (12 m) Gillig Low Floor Plus Battery Electric buses (44254E–44257E) that are branded in the FLASH scheme.

During icy weather conditions that prevent the use of the articulated buses, Flash uses the 2017 40-foot (12 m) Gillig LF40 BRT Plus diesel buses (44056D–44072D) that are branded in the Ride On extRa scheme.

In January 2025 and on December 5 of that year, Flash used 13 of Ride On's 2008 40-foot (12 m) Gillig Low Floor diesel buses (5726, 5728, 5730, 5732–5736, 5738/5739, 5742/5743, and 5745) during the blizzard.

In February 2025, Flash used 8 of Ride On's 2009 40-foot (12 m) Gillig Low Floor diesel buses (5747–5750 and 5753–5756) due to snowy weather.

As early as the spring months of 2027, the 2026 New Flyer XHE60s (46016H–46028H) are expected to enter service.

== Stations ==
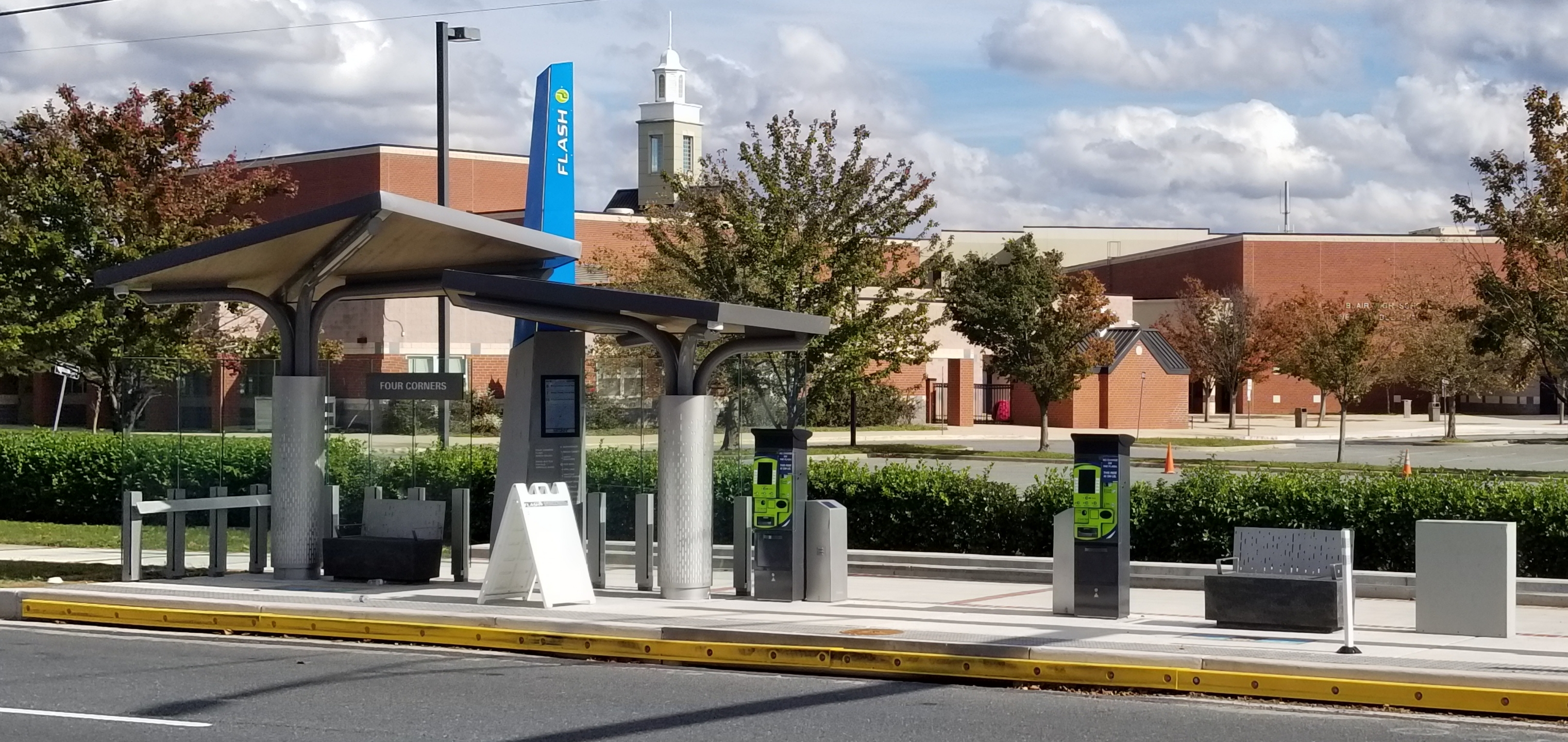
Four Corners station

There are approximately 49 stations proposed across the entire future network, with 14 stations currently operating on the US 29 routes. Each station includes a canopy, a seating area, a passenger information system that displays when the next bus is coming, and a blue pylon mounted above the canopy that flashes when a bus is about to arrive.
