= Forest Glen station =

Washington Metro station

Forest Glen
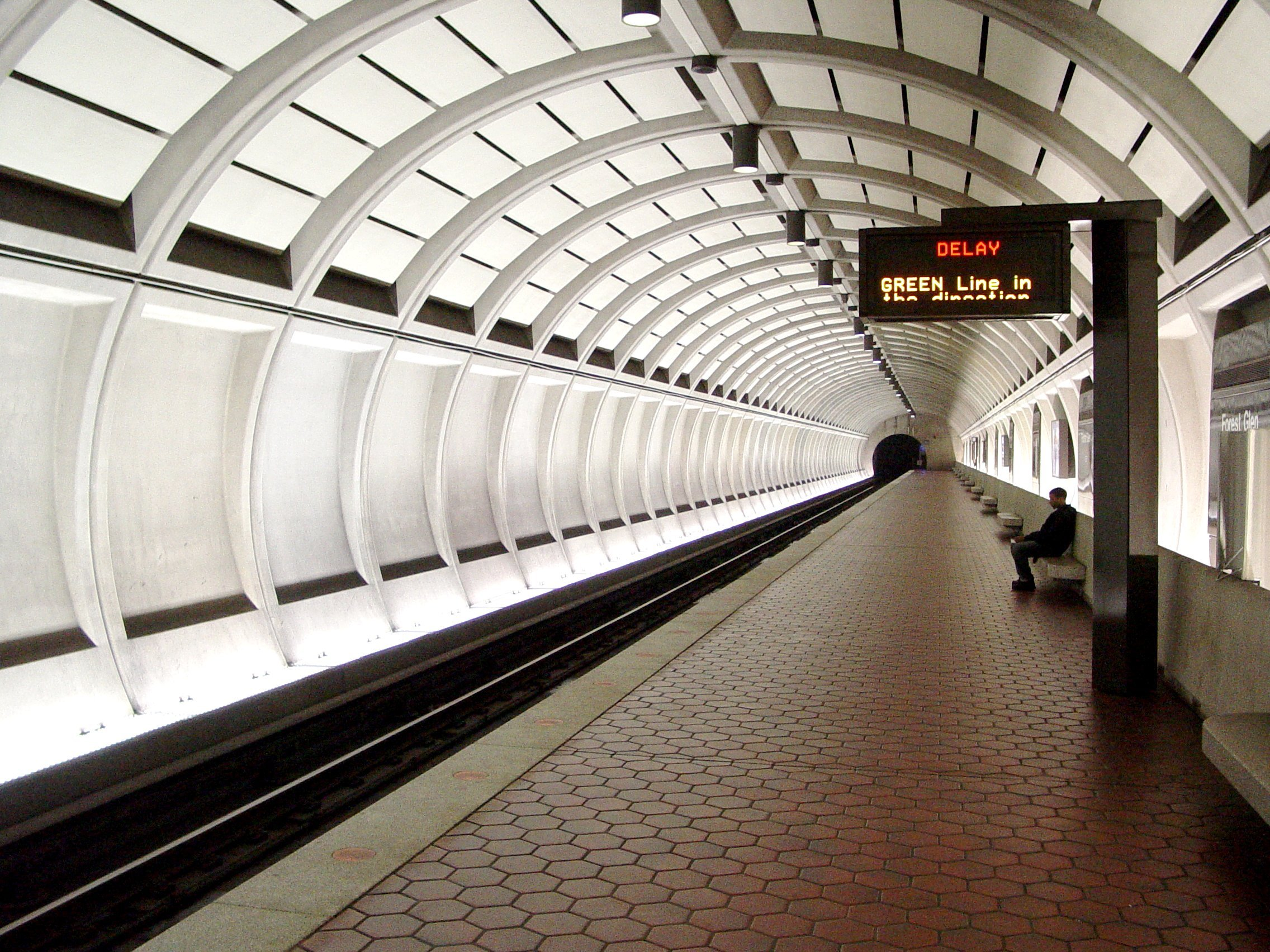
- Forest Glen station platform in October 2003

General information
- Location: 9730 Georgia Avenue; Forest Glen, Maryland
- Coordinates: 39.0153°N 77.0430°W
- Owner: Washington Metropolitan Area Transit Authority
- Platforms: 2 twin tube interconnected side platforms
- Tracks: 2
- Connections: Ride On: 7, 8; Metrobus: M20

Construction
- Structure type: Underground
- Depth: 196 ft (60 m)
- Parking: 592 spaces
- Cycle facilities: 42 racks, 16 lockers
- Accessible: Yes

Other information
- Station code: B09

History
- Opened: September 22, 1990; 36 years ago

Passengers
- 2025: 1,598 (average weekday)
- Rank: 85 of 98

Services
Preceding station	Washington Metro	Following station
Silver Spring toward Shady Grove	Red Line	Wheaton toward Glenmont
Route map
Location

Forest Glen station is a Washington Metro station in Montgomery County, Maryland, United States. The station was opened on September 22, 1990, and is operated by the Washington Metropolitan Area Transit Authority (WMATA). Its opening coincided with the completion of 3.2 miles (5.1 km) of rail north of the Silver Spring station and the opening of Wheaton. Providing service for the Red Line, the station is located at Georgia Avenue (Maryland Route 97) and Forest Glen Road. The station is the deepest on the system and the state of Maryland at 196 feet (60 m) deep, so high-speed elevators, rather than escalators, are used for access to the surface.

== History ==
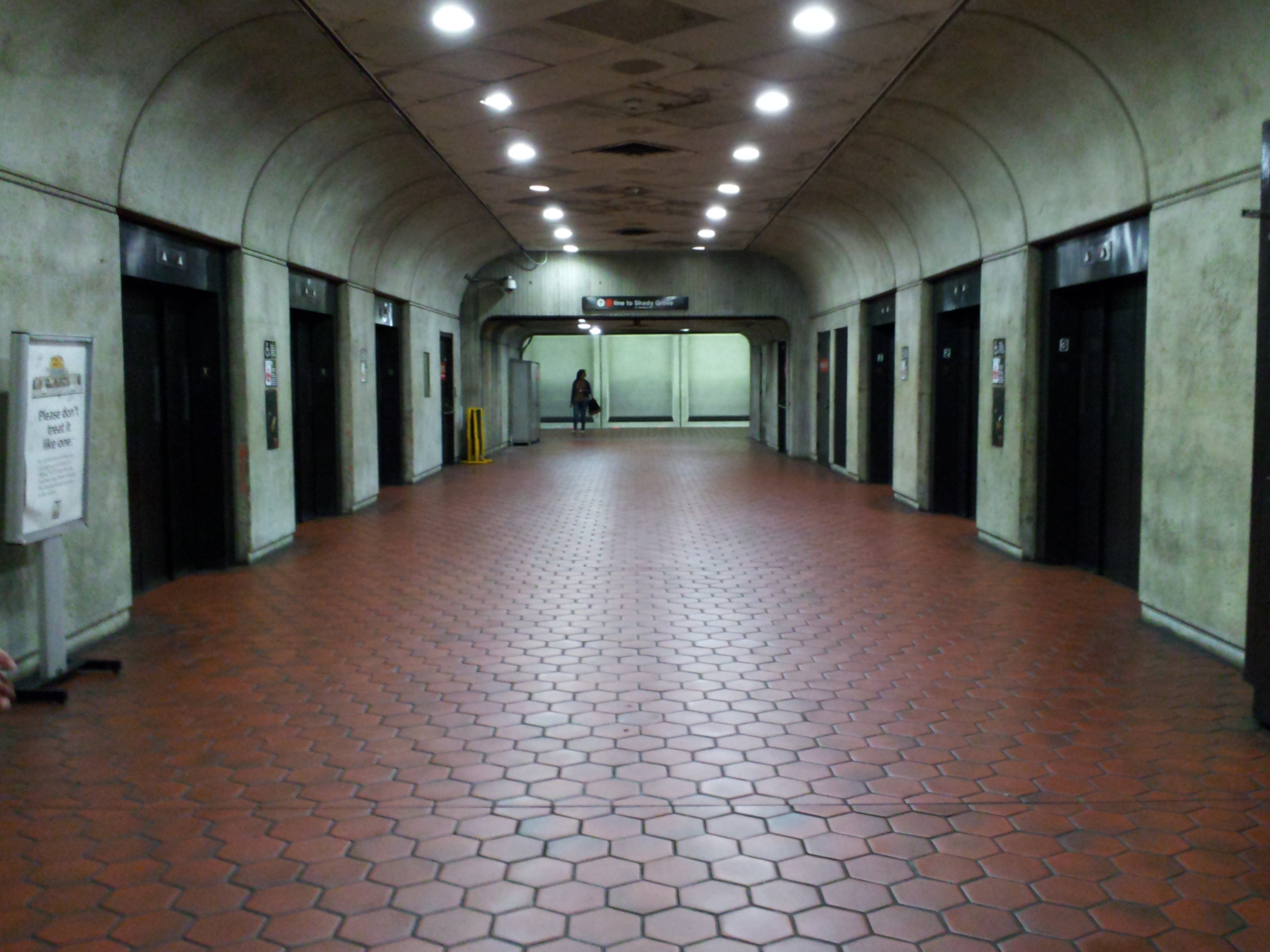
Elevator hall, train level

The original plan was to build the station above ground, with a parking lot that would have required demolishing about fifteen homes. After community opposition to the above-ground station, Montgomery County approved a modified plan for an underground station.

The originally planned location for the parking lot and bus stops was on the east side of Georgia Avenue, between Sherwood Road and Tilton Drive, near Woodland Drive. Tilton Drive would have been closed between Georgia Avenue and Woodland Drive in order to reduce traffic through the nearby residential neighborhood. Building the parking lot and bus stops there would have required the demolition of one business and several homes.

Response to plans for the underground station were mixed, with some residents and local businesses looking forward to the convenience of a nearby station and other residents concerned about potential increases in traffic in the area. Metro contended that deleting the station from the plans altogether would have overloaded both Wheaton and Silver Spring metro stations. The Montgomery County council approved the station in January 1976, three months after it had approved the further-away Wheaton station.

On August 13, 1991, all six elevators broke down due to a malfunctioning fire sensor, blocking access to and from the station for several hours.

On June 1, 2024, all Red Line stations north of Fort Totten, including this one, were closed to allow the Maryland Transit Authority to work on the upcoming Purple Line. Takoma re-opened on June 29 while the rest of the stations re-opened on September 1, 2024.

== Layout ==
Building the tunnels through soft rock close to the surface would have been either very costly or impossible, so engineers decided to dig the tunnels through harder, more solid rock deeper in the ground. Due to tracks resting at a depth of 196 feet (60 m), Forest Glen is the only station in the system without direct surface access by way of escalators. Instead, a bank of six high-speed elevators serve the station, with each elevator able to travel at a rate of 17 feet per second (5.2 m/s) between the underground station and the surface. Because of the lack of escalators, Forest Glen is the only station equipped with fire doors to protect customers during a train fire and evacuation. In addition, a 20-story staircase exists for emergency use. South of this station, trains emerge from the tunnel.

This station, along with Wheaton station farther north and Fort Totten's lower level, has separate tunnels and platforms for each direction, instead of the large, vaulted common room seen at most other underground stations in the Metro system; this design, which is similar to many of the London Underground's tube stations, was used to save money due to the station's depth.
