= Colesville Road Line =

Bus route

M52, M54
- Colesville Road–Burtonsville Line; Colesville Road–Greencastle Line

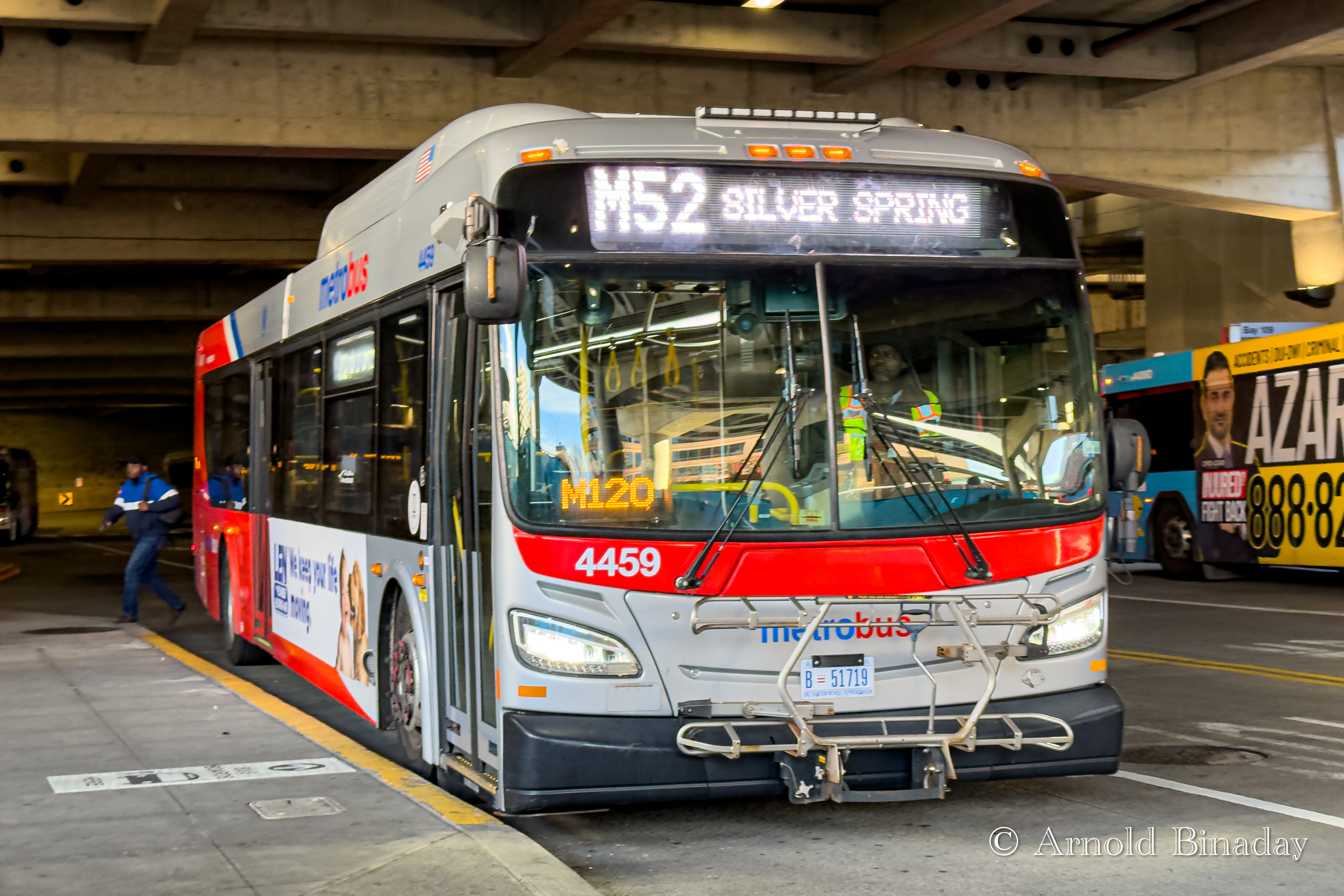
- Route M52 at Silver Spring station in January 2026

Overview
- System: Metrobus
- Operator: Washington Metropolitan Area Transit Authority
- Garage: Montgomery
- Livery: Local
- Status: In Service

Route
- Locale: Montgomery County, Prince George's County
- Communities served: Silver Spring, Four Corners, White Oak, Fairland, Calverton, Burtonsville, Laurel
- Landmarks served: South Laurel Park & Ride Lot (M52), Burtonsville Crossing Park & Ride Lot (M52), Greencastle Park & Ride Lot (M54), Paint Branch High School (M52), Fairland, Calverton (M52), Westfarm (M52), East County Education Center (M52), White Oak, Four Corners, Montgomery Blair High School, Paul S. Sarbanes Transit Center (Silver Spring station)
- Start: M52: Burtonsville Crossing Park & Ride Lot (Off-Peak and Weekends); South Laurel Park & Ride Lot (Select Weekday Peak Hour Trips only); M54: Greencastle Park & Ride Lot
- Via: Briggs Chaney Road, Calverton Boulevard, Old Columbia Pike, Lockwood Drive, Columbia Pike, Colesville Road
- End: Silver Spring station
- Length: 60 minutes

Service
- Level: Daily
- Frequency: 30 minutes (Both routes)
- Operates: 4:30 AM - 1:30 AM
- Ridership: 835,383 (Z6, FY 2025); 801,404 (Z8, FY 2025)
- Transfers: SmarTrip only
- Timetable: Colesville Road Line

The Colesville Road Line, designated as the Colesville Road–Burtonsville Line on Route M52, and Colesville Road–Greencastle Line on Route M54, are daily bus routes operated by the Washington Metropolitan Area Transit Authority between Burtonsville Crossing Park & Ride lot (M52) and Greencastle Park & Ride Lot (M54), and Silver Spring station of the Red Line of the Washington Metro. Both lines operate every 30 minutes at all times, at a combined frequency of every 15 minutes. Both trips are roughly 60 minutes long. These new routes replaced the Silver Spring–Fairland Line routes Z6 and Z8, and Laurel–Burtonsville Express Line route Z7 as part of WMATA's Better Bus Network Redesign on June 29, 2025.

== Background ==
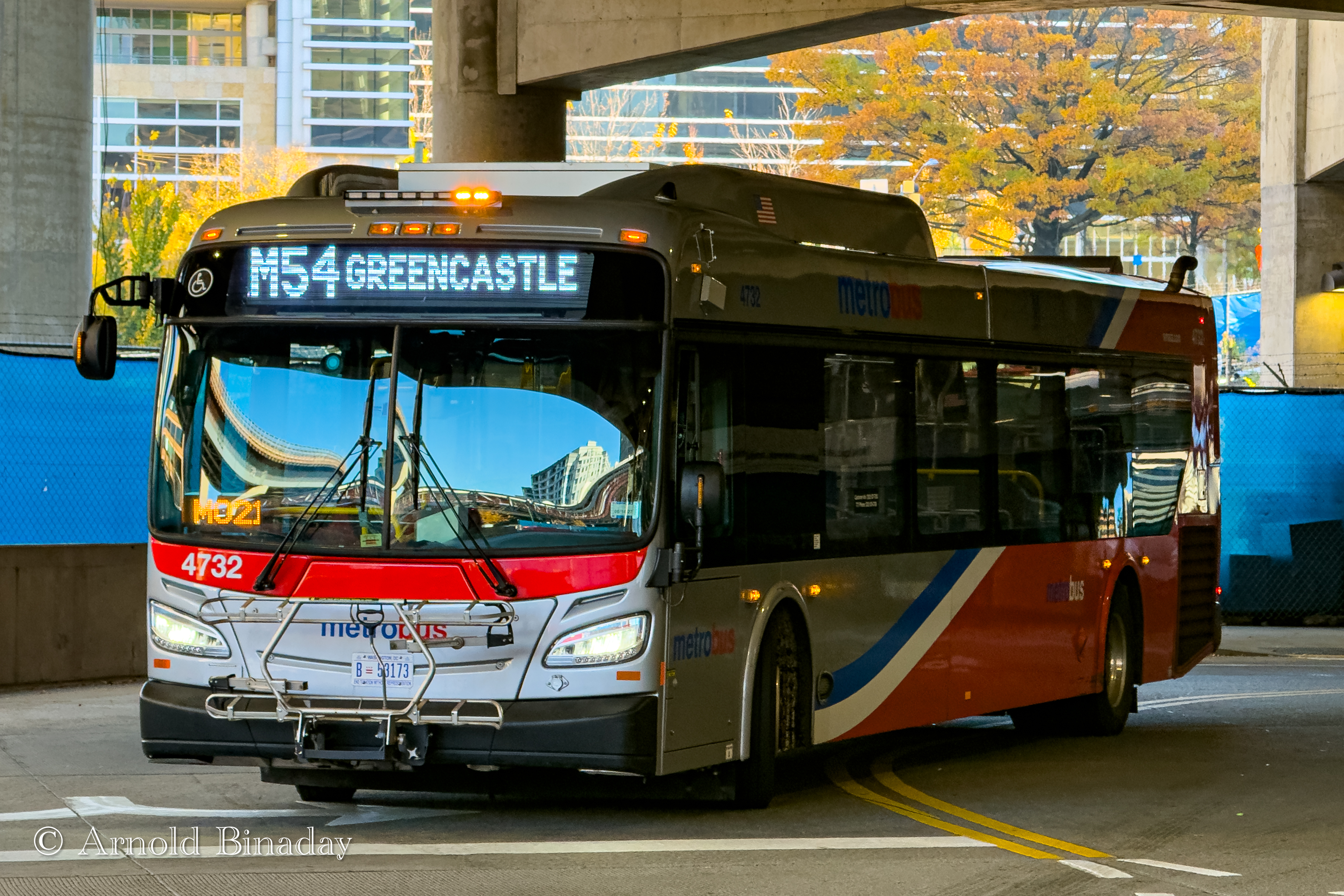
Route M54 at Silver Spring station in November 2025

Route M52 operates daily running between Silver Spring station and Burtonsville Crossing Park & Ride with select weekday peak hour trips extended to South Laurel Park & Ride. The route operates via Calverton, Westfarm, and White Oak, Maryland.

Route M54 operates daily running between Silver Spring station and Greencastle Park & Ride mostly along Old Columbia Pike and Colesville Road.

Both Routes operate out of Montgomery division.

== History ==
=== 20th Century ===
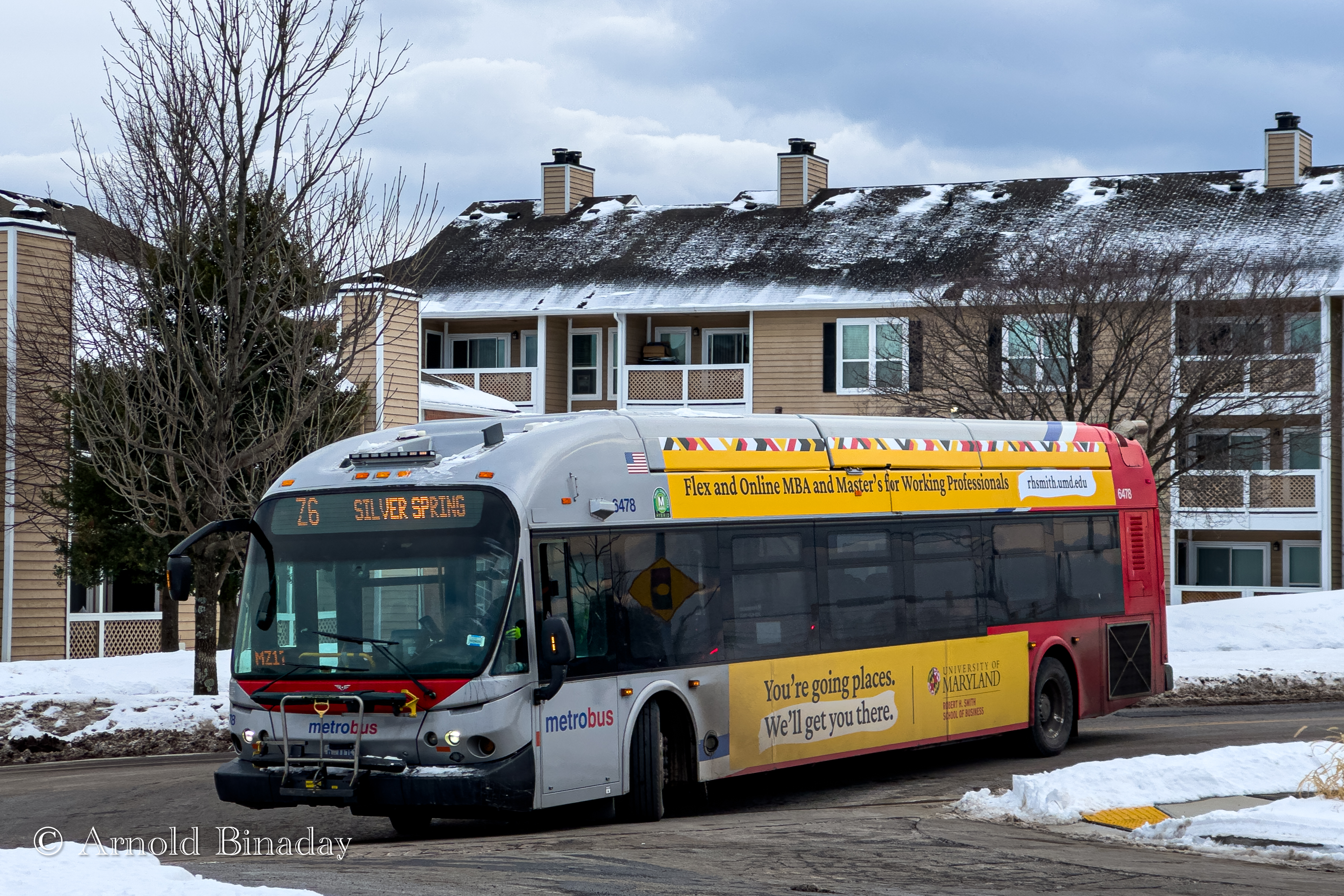
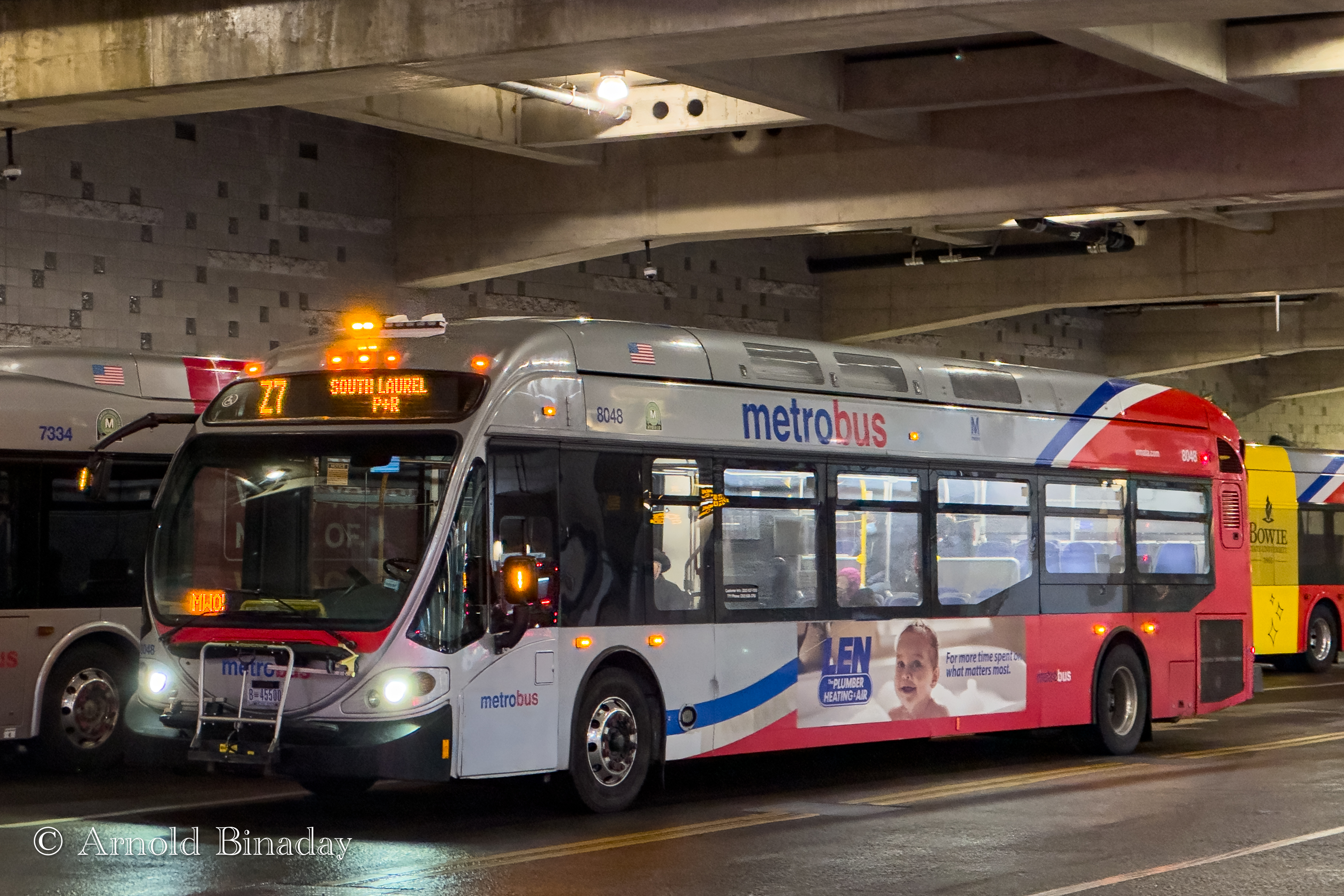
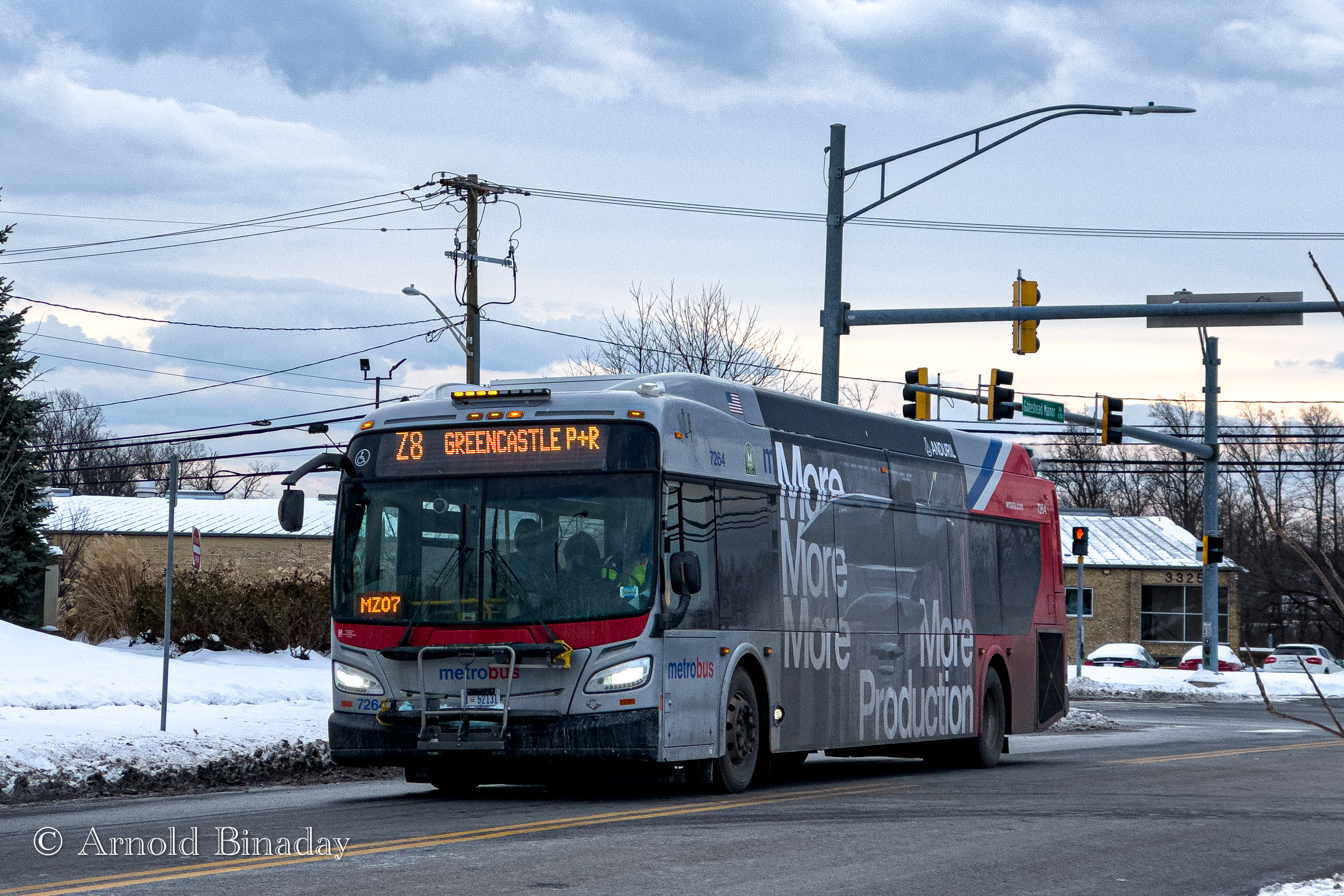
Former Routes Z6, Z7, and Z8 in January 2025.

Route Z2 originally operated as the Silver Spring-Wheaton Line under the Capital Transit Company. The line originally operated between Silver Spring and Wheaton Metro stations. The line was transferred to buses in the 1940s but was later discontinued.

The Colesville–Ashton Line was originally operated under route Z1 which operated as Streetcars. The line was later formed by buses in June 1956, renamed to route Z2, and acquired by DC Transit. The line was later acquired by WMATA on February 4, 1973.

Route Z2 operated alongside the Z1, Z3, and Z4 as the Colesville Line. Route Z2 operated between Silver Spring Metro station and Olney with select trips ending in Cloverly.

On February 19, 1978, route Z2 alongside the Z1, Z3, and Z4 was extended to Silver Spring Metro station after it opened on February 6, 1978.

Route Z6 was created on January 27, 1985, which operated between Silver Spring station and Calverton mostly operating along Calverton Boulevard, Old Columbia Pike, Columbia Pike, Lockwood Drive, Colesville Road. In the 1990s, route Z6 was discontinued and replaced by route Z7 which took over the Calverton routing which Z6 operated on.

Route Z7 was also created on January 27, 1985, which operated between Silver Spring station and Burtonsville Crossing Park & Ride lot alongside route Z6 which operated to Calverton instead of Burtonsville. In the 1990s, Z7 was rerouted to operate under the Calverton Express Line alongside route Z17 replacing route Z6. Route Z7 and Z17 operated along Colesville Road, Columbia Pike, and Beltsville Drive with route Z7 diverting onto Colesville Road between Burtonsville Park & Ride and Columbia Pike and Industrial Parkway while route Z17 remaining on Columbia Pike. A route Z19 was later introduced to operate between Silver Spring station and the Seventh-day Adventist Church Parking Lot via Takoma station having a single trip operate in both directions during the weekday peak hours. The route was later discontinued on June 29, 2003, due to low ridership.

Route Z8 had prior incarnations as the Old Bladensburg Road Line and the Sligo Avenue Line. The lines were at first operated as streetcars under the Capital Traction Company. The lines would later be operated by buses in 1927 and 1940. Both lines were later merged into one, later operated until DC Transit in 1956 and then acquired by WMATA on February 4, 1973. However the Z8 was later replaced by Ride On.

Route Z8 would later be reincarnated as the Colesville Road–Fairland Line which would operate between Silver Spring station and Burtonsville Crossing Park & Ride lot via White Oak, Greencastle Park & Ride Lot, Briggs Chaney Park & Ride Lot, and a few peak-hour trips to Verizon–Chesapeake Complex.

Routes Z9 and Z29 operate as part of the Laurel–Burtonsville Express Line operating between today current route between Silver Spring station and South Laurel Park & Ride Lot. The major difference between routes Z9 and Z29 was route Z29 remained on Columbia Pike while route Z9 was rerouted along Colesville Road between Burtonsville Park & Ride and Columbia Pike and Industrial Parkway.

Routes Z1, Z3, and Z4 were separated from the Colesville Line and got formed into different routes by the 1990s. Routes Z1 and Z4 were formed into the Glenmont–Silver Spring Line to operate between Silver Spring and Glenmont Metro stations. Routes Z3 and Z5 operated between Silver Spring Metro station and Burtonsville Park and Ride. Route Z2 remained under the Colesville Line being extended to Olney (Spartan Road & Georgia Avenue).

In September 1993, Ride On took over the Saturday service for the Z2, under the Colesville–Silver Spring Line. The reason why was because WMATA had to reduce costs and apply buses to more higher ridership routes.

=== 21st Century ===
After a series of proposals in early 2004, many changes happened on the Colesville Road Line.

Route Z2 was rerouted to serve Briggs Chaney, Good Hope, and Cape May roads instead of operating directly via New Hampshire Avenue and replacing route Z3. Weekday, midday, and Saturday trips only operated between Silver Spring Metro station and Colesville. Route Z2 would be renamed to the Colesville–Ashton Line as a result of the changes.

Route Z6 was also reincarnated in service as the Tanglewood–Westfarm Line, which would operate between Silver Spring station and Burtonsville Crossing Park & Ride lot via Calverton, Westfarm, and White Oak, Maryland on September 26, 2004. The new Z6 replaced the Glenmont–Silver Spring Line (Z1 and Z4), Colesville–Fairland Express Line (Z3 and Z5), the Calverton Express Line (Z7 and Z17), and route Z8's routing between Greencastle Park & Ride Lot and Burtonsville Park & Ride.

Route Z6 replaced route Z4 routing between Lockwood Drive, Stewart Lane, and Old Columbia Pike through the White Oak Shopping Center and White Oak Apartments, Z1, Z4, Z5, Z7, & Z17's routing on Columbia Pike, Industrial Parkway, Tech Road, and Broadbirch Drive in Westfarm, and a portion of Z7 & Z17's routing on Calverton Boulevard in Calverton. Routes Z1, Z3, Z4, Z5, Z7, and Z17 were all discontinued and route Z8 was shorten to Greencastle Park & Ride Lot with all the discontinued routings combined into the new route Z6. Route Z6 will operate along Lockwood Drive to White Oak, then operate to Calverton via Broadbirch Drive, Calverton Boulevard, Galway Drive, and Fairland Road. Route Z6 will then operate along Briggs Chaney Road serving Briggs Chaney Park & Ride and #14000 Castle Boulevard. It will then operate along Old Columbia Pike to Burtonsville Crossing Park & Ride lot. The service would only operate on weekdays however.

Route Z8 was also shorten to operate between Silver Spring station and Greencastle Park & Ride Lot via Briggs Chaney Park & Ride Lot on the same. Service to the Burtonsville Crossing Park & Ride Lot was replaced by new Route Z6. The Z8 also replaced portions of the Z1, Z3, Z4, and Z5 which were all discontinued on the same day. Route Z9 and Z29 also replaced portions of route Z7 and Z17 between Silver Spring and Industrial Parkway.

==== Later Changes ====
On June 24, 2007, Route Z2 was rerouted to remain on New Hampshire Avenue between Briggs Chaney and Cape May roads. Service along Good Hope and Cape May roads got discontinued and replaced by Ride On Route 39. Route Z6 service to Tanglewood was discontinued and replaced by a new Ride On Route 21. The line was also changed from the Tanglewood–Westfarm Line to the Calverton–Westfarm Line.

On June 28, 2009, most off-peak service for route Z2 was discontinued due to low ridership. Weekday peak hour service and Saturday service still operated.

In 2012, WMATA proposed to eliminate all the Saturday Z2 service and on the four federal holidays on which a Saturday schedule is operated. This was due to unduplicated segment of the Saturday Z2 (between Bonifant Road / Good Hope and Randolph roads) that served very few passengers and most of the Saturday Z2 was served by another route with capacity to accommodate the 2012 route Z2 riders. Alternative service was provided by Routes C8 and Z8.

In December 2012, WMATA announced that all the weekend Z2 trips operated by Ride On will be eliminated on January 12, 2013 due to low ridership. Alternative service would be provided by routes C8 and Z8.

When the Paul S. Sarbanes Transit Center at Silver Spring station opened, Routes Z2, Z6, Z8, Z9, and Z29 were rerouted from its bus stop along Dixon Avenue to Bus Bay 113, Bus Bay 106, Bus Bay 114, and Bus Bay 112 respectively.

During WMATA's Fiscal Year of 2016, WMATA proposed to add Saturday service to route Z6 between Silver Spring, Calverton and Fairland with buses arriving every 30 minutes and to reduce the number of trips between Castle Boulevard and Burtonsville. WMATA reasons that the current route Z6 schedule does not provide enough time for buses to get from one end to the other, ridership is high for route Z6 on the weekdays, and there are very few riders using the Z6 between Castle Boulevard and Burtonsville.

Routes Z9 and Z29 were also proposed to be combined into one route into a new route Z29. However, route Z29 will divert onto Old Columbia Pike between Greencastle and Briggs Chaney Roads discontinuing a portion of the route along Columbia Pike. A new Route Z3 will provide off–peak direction bus service between Silver Spring, Burtonsville and South Laurel replacing route Z9. The express section of Columbia Pike, between Greencastle and Briggs Chaney roads would be eliminated.

On March 27, 2016, Saturday service was added for Route Z6 which will operate between Silver Spring station and #14000 Castle Boulevard only. Saturday service will operate every 30 minutes, the same as weekday frequency. Routes Z9 and Z29 were also discontinued and replaced by a new Route Z7. The new route would operate every 30 minutes along the former Route Z9 routing with express service along Columbia Pike between Industrial Parkway and Burtonsville Park & Ride. Route Z7 will operate during peak hours primarily in the peak direction with a few trips operating in the non peak direction and have the same boarding/alighting restrictions as Routes Z9 and Z29. Route Z7 will also have an increase frequency in South Laurel, which was something that wasn't provided by routes Z9 and Z29.

In 2016 during WMATA's 2017 Fiscal Year, it was proposed for route Z7 to eliminate service between Burtonsville Park & Ride and South Laurel with alternative service provided by routes 87, 89, and 89M. The reason was for WMATA to reduce costs and it was a high subsidy per rider. Another option was for route Z7 to be available at a reduced frequency and span. Other proposals was for route Z7 to be shorten around Fairland or Burtonsville Park & Ride discontinuing service to Silver Spring station with service replaced by Ride On Flash BRT U.S. Route 29 route when it opens.

On June 25, 2017, the frequency of buses from reduced from 30 minutes to 35–45 minutes for route Z7.

During WMATA's 2021 Fiscal Year, WMATA proposed to eliminate the Z6 route segment between Castle Boulevard and Burtonsville Park-and-Ride and replace it with the Ride On Flash BRT U.S. Route 29 route when it opens. However, Route Z6 will be extended to Greencastle Park and Ride replacing routes Z8 and Z11 and adding additional frequency to the Z6 and add new Sunday service. The reasons all come down due to the upcoming Ride On Flash BRT service along U.S. Route 29. As a result, WMATA would eliminate all Route Z2, Z8, and Z11 service as it was going to overlap the upcoming Ride On Flash BRT service along U.S. Route 29.

Montgomery County expressed concerns over the proposed changes. According to Council Vice President Tom Hucker, residents impacted 65,000 residents of the Maryland county. Residents urged WMATA not to cut service as it will cause a lack of transportation towards the residents. Additionally, at least 30 Montgomery County leaders called on WMATA not to cut Metrobus routes in the region, saying it will "disproportionately affect" students, seniors, and service workers with no other source of transportation. The letter's signatories include state senators Craig Zucker, Susan Lee, and Cheryl Kagan, Maryland State Delegates Marc Korman, Sara Love, and Julie Palakovich Carr and all nine members of the county council. In a letter to Metro Chairman Paul Smedberg, members of the Montgomery County Council and state delegation said they opposed the cuts, which are part of WMATA's proposed FY 2021 operating budget, and urged the agency to prioritize "maintaining frequent and reliable service." They also quote;

The Metrobus routes currently recommended for service reductions, including the Q, J, L and Z bus lines, provide transportation for many of our most transit-dependent residents," the lawmakers wrote. "Service reductions will disproportionately affect students commuting to Montgomery College, seniors running daily errands and service workers accessing jobs. Roughly 65,000 Montgomery riders use Metrobus on a daily basis, and for many these bus routes are their only source of transportation.

The 35 lawmakers ended the letter by saying cuts to Metrobus service for Montgomery County would counter their "regional goals of reducing traffic congestion and greenhouse gas emissions."

On April 2, 2020, the FY2021 budget was released and WMATA. For Route Z2, out of 232 votes from customer feedback, 85% of votes were against the changes, 4% of votes in favor with the remaining 11% uncertain. For Route Z6, out of 251 votes from customer feedback, 59% of votes were against the changes while 18% of votes in favor with the remaining 33% uncertain. For Route Z8, out of 286 votes from customer feedback, 70% of voters were against the changes while 13% were in favor of the changes with 17% uncertain. As a result, WMATA backed off from the proposal.

Beginning on March 16, 2020, Routes Z6 and Z8 began operating on its Saturday schedule in WMATA's response to the COVID-19 pandemic. However, on March 18, 2020, all Route Z2, Z6 and Z7 service were suspended and Route Z8 was further reduced as WMATA shifted to a modified Sunday schedule. On March 21, 2020, weekend service was reduced to operate every 30 minutes on the Z8. Routes Z2, Z6, and Z7 were restored on August 23, 2020, but all three routes were reduced to having limited weekday service and Route Z6 Saturday service being suspended. Route Z8 was also restored to its pre-pandemic schedule.

On September 26, 2020, WMATA proposed to eliminate all route Z6 Saturday service due to low federal funding. However Route Z6 Saturday service was restored and the route was restored to its pre-pandemic schedule on March 14, 2021.

On September 5, 2021, Routes Z6 and Z8 were merged into the Silver Spring–Fairland Line, eliminating the Calverton–Westfarm Line and Fairland Line names operating every 15 minutes between both lines. Route Z6 also added new Sunday service. Route Z8's routing inside the Verizon-Chesapeake Complex was also eliminated. However, Route Z8 was extended to Greencastle Park & Ride during the weekday peak hours.

In 2024 during WMATA's FY2024 Budget crisis, WMATA proposed to eliminate all Z2 and Z7 service, and eliminate all weekend Z6 service. However on April 25, 2024, Metro’s Board of Directors approved a $4.8 billion capital and operating budget which avoided service cuts.

=== Better Bus Redesign ===
In 2022, WMATA launched its Better Bus Redesign project, which aimed to redesign the entire Metrobus Network and is the first full redesign of the agency's bus network in its history.

In April 2023, WMATA launched its Draft Visionary Network. As part of the drafts, WMATA proposed to combine the Z6, Z7, and Z8 into one singular route between Silver Spring station and Laurel station on the MARC Camden Line. The route was named Route MD242 and would operate via Colesville Road, Columbia Pike, Old Columbia Pike, Briggs Chaney Road, Robey Road, Ballinger Drive, Wexhall Drive, Greencastle Park & Ride, Greencastle Road, Old Columbia Pike, Burtonsville Park & Ride, Sandy Springs Road, Sweitzer Lane, Konterra Drive, Contee Road, Laurel Bowie Road, South Laurel Park & Ride, Cherry Lane, 4th Street, and Gorman Avenue.

Service in White Oak along Lockwood Drive and Stewart Lane would be operated by the Ride On Flash BRT Orange Line, and the proposed Route MD346, which would operate between the Food and Drug Administration Headquarters and South Laurel Park & Ride. Service between Tech Road Park & Ride and Castle Boulevard via Industrial Parkway, Broadbirch Drive, Calverton Boulevard, Galway Drive, Fairland Road, Briggs Chaney Road, and Briggs Chaney Park & Ride would be discontinued under WMATA's proposal.

Additionally, all Route Z2 service would be eliminated. The Z2 segment along New Hampshire Avenue via the intersection of Columbia Pike & New Hampshire Avenue and the intersection of New Hampshire Avenue & Randolph Road would be covered by Route MD 144 (later got renamed to routes M6X and M42). All service between the intersection of New Hampshire Avenue & Randolph Road and MedStar Montgomery Medical Center via New Hampshire Avenue, and Norwood and Olney Sandy Spring roads, plus service to Ashton would be eliminated.

During WMATA's Revised Draft Visionary Network, WMATA renamed the proposed Route MD242 to Route M52 and modified the proposal to serve Castle Boulevard and the Briggs Chaney Park & Ride. The proposed M52 would also serve White Oak via Lockwood Drive and Stewart Lane, and the Z6 routing between Tech Road Park & Ride and Castle Boulevard. Also, service in Laurel was modified with Route M52 terminating at South Laurel Park & Ride, with service to Laurel station being shelved. The route would also be modified in Laurel with the route operating via Van Dusen Road, Cherry Lane, 4th Street, 5th Street (to Silver Spring), Talbott Avenue, Gorman Avenue (to Laurel), and Laurel Bowie Road to South Laurel Park & Ride. All trips were to operate between Silver Spring and Laurel daily, with new weekend service to Burtonsville.

A new Route P11 was introduced under the proposal to operate to Greencastle Park & Ride and would operate under the proposed Route MD248 routing between Hyattsville Crossing station and White Oak Medical Center via Route 86's routing along East-West Highway, Baltimore Avenue, Rhode Island Avenue, Powder Mill Road, Amendale Road, and Cherry Hill Road. Then the proposed Route P11 would be extended to Greencastle Park & Ride via Broadbirch Drive, Tech Road, Old Columbia Pike, Briggs Chaney Road, Briggs Chaney Park & Ride, Robey Road, Ballinger Drive, Wexhall Drive, and Greencastle Road. All changes were then proposed during WMATA's 2025 Proposed Network.

During the proposal, WMATA changed the M52 to only have service to Laurel operating during the weekday peak hours, with service between Silver Spring and Burtonsville Park & Ride operating daily. Route P11 was also dropped from the proposal in favor of a new Route M54. The route, being similar to the current Route Z8, would operate alongside the proposed Route M52 between Silver Spring station and Greencastle Park & Ride. However, the proposed route would split from the M52 at Tech Road Park & Ride and operate along Old Columbia Pike to Briggs Chaney Road. Then the route would operate along the former proposed Route P11 routing to Greencastle Park & Ride. Service to Briggs Chaney Park & Ride and along Castle Boulevard would be served by the proposed Route M52.

On November 21, 2024, WMATA approved its Better Bus Redesign Network.

Beginning on June 29, 2025, Route Z6 remained mostly the same between Silver Spring and Burtonsville; however, it was also combined with Route Z7 to South Laurel Park & Ride Lot during the weekday peak hours, and was renamed to the M52. Weekend service was also extended to Burtonsville Park & Ride. Route Z8 was renamed to the M54 and discontinued service along Castle Boulevard and Briggs Chaney Park & Ride. All Route Z2 service was eliminated with replacement service being covered by the M52, M54, and M60.

As a result of Route Z2 being discontinued, Ride On announced a new Flex Zone Route 918, serving areas near White Oak, Sandy Spring, and New Hampshire Avenue to cover areas previously served by the discontinued Metrobus route Z2.

== Incidents ==
- On February 1, 2012, a Z8 bus (DE40LF 6020) and a truck collided along Colesville Road and Franklin Avenue during the AM peak hour. Two passengers from the bus suffered minor injuries.
- On December 19, 2021, a car collided with a Z8 bus along Fairland Road and Fairridge Drive killing the driver and injuring the bus operator.
- On February 17, 2023, at around 7:45 p.m., 22-year-old Trevon Hatcherson-Ross shot and killed 19-year-old Justice T’Ziyan Elliott on board a Z6 bus at the intersection of Lockwood Drive and New Hampshire Avenue in White Oak after both passengers got into an altercation. Hatcherson-Ross fled the scene but was later arrested on June 14, 2024, for the shooting.
