= Wheaton station (Washington Metro) =

Washington Metro station

Wheaton
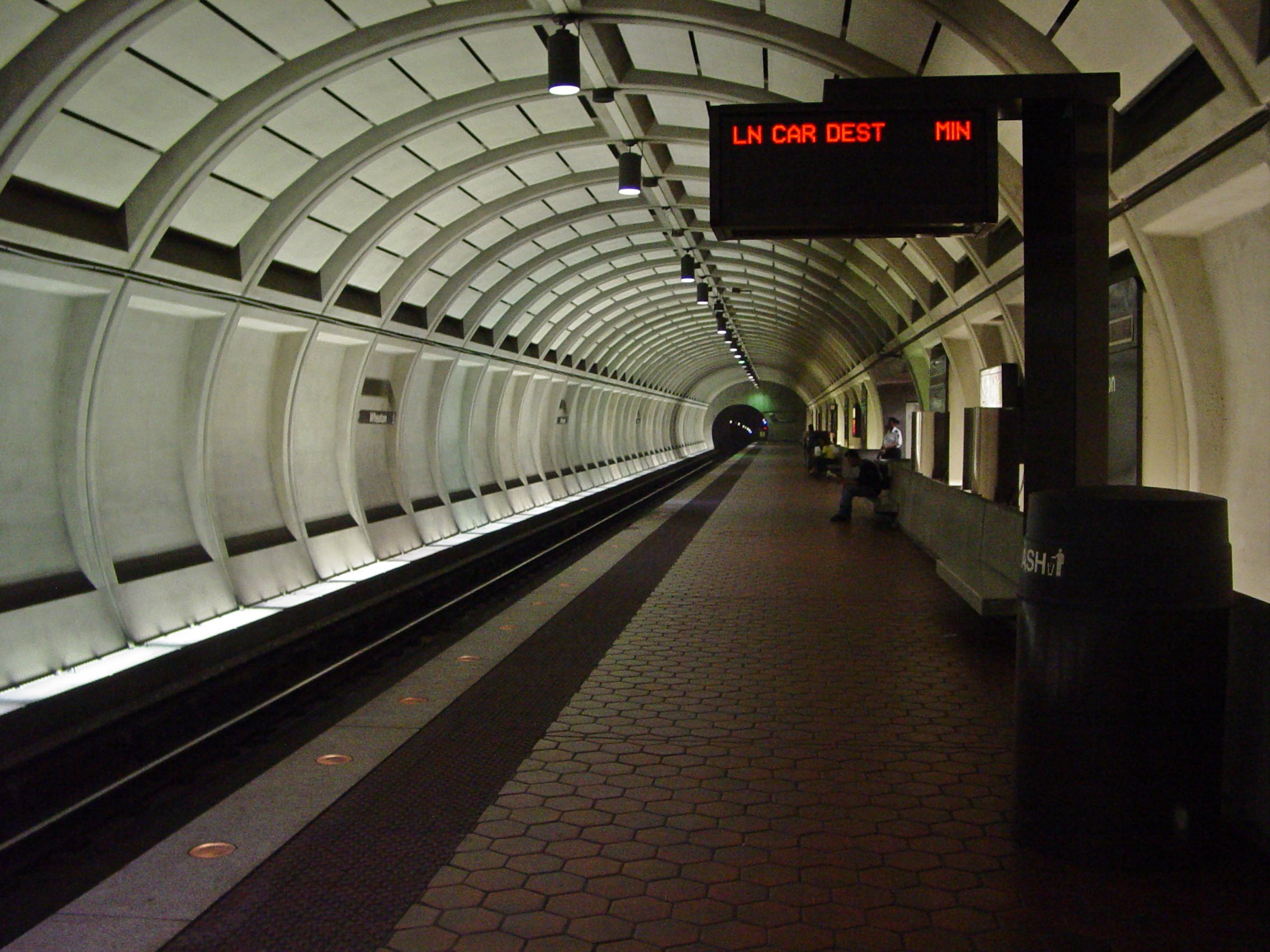
- Station platform in July 2006

General information
- Location: 11001 Veirs Mill Road; Wheaton, Maryland
- Coordinates: 39.0386°N 77.0508°W
- Owner: Washington Metropolitan Area Transit Authority
- Platforms: 2 twin tube interconnected side platforms
- Tracks: 2
- Connections: Ride On: 4, 7, 8, 9, 31, 34, 37, 38, 40, 41, 48; Metrobus: M12, M20, M22

Construction
- Structure type: Underground
- Depth: 145 ft (44 m)
- Parking: 977 spaces
- Cycle facilities: Capital Bikeshare, 36 racks, 20 lockers
- Accessible: Yes

Other information
- Station code: B10

History
- Opened: September 22, 1990

Passengers
- 2025: 2,404 (average weekday)
- Rank: 72 of 98

Services
Preceding station	Washington Metro	Following station
Forest Glen toward Shady Grove	Red Line	Glenmont Terminus
Route map
Location

Wheaton station is a Washington Metro station in Montgomery County, Maryland on the Red Line. The station serves the suburb of Wheaton, and is located at the intersection of Georgia Avenue (Maryland Route 97) and Reedie Drive. The station contains 230-foot-long (70 m) escalators, which are the longest set of single-span escalators in the Western Hemisphere.

Service at Wheaton began on September 22, 1990. It was the northeastern end of the Red Line for nearly eight years, until Glenmont opened in July 1998.

On June 1, 2024, all Red Line stations north of Fort Totten were closed to allow the Maryland Transit Administration to work on the upcoming Purple Line. Takoma re-opened on June 29, while the rest of the stations re-opened on September 1.

== Station layout ==
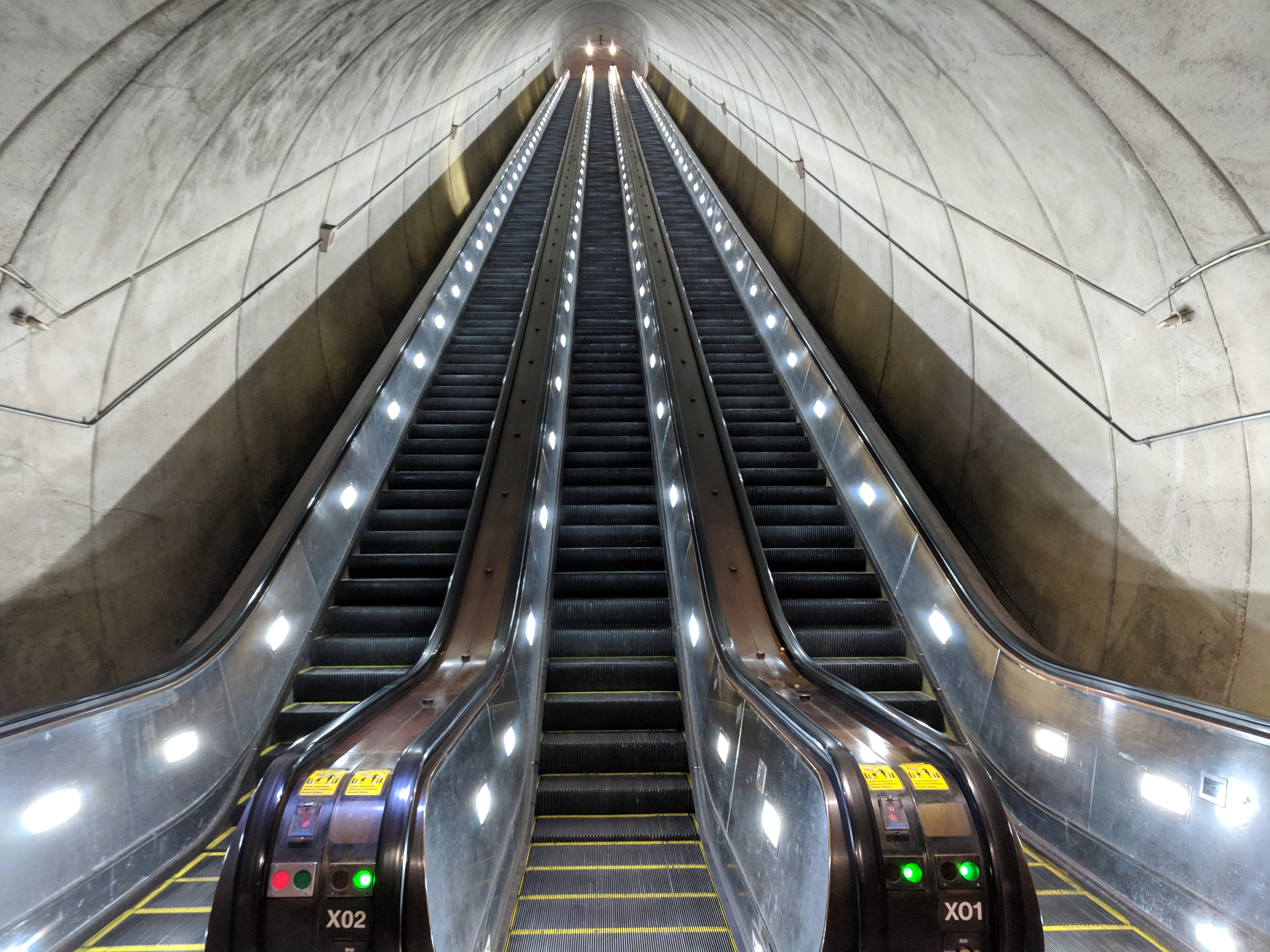
The station's escalators are 230 feet (70 m) long, the longest escalators in the Western Hemisphere.

Wheaton station features the longest set of single-span escalators in the Western Hemisphere, each featuring a length of 230 feet (70 m), with a vertical rise of 115 feet (35 m). Wheaton's escalators travel at a speed of 90 feet (27 m) per minute (±5%) and are set at an inclination of 30 degrees. The trip takes approximately 2 minutes and 45 seconds. There are two elevators leading into the station's parking garage at the Reedie Drive entrance, while the entrance at the bus bay is at ground level. Inside the station, there is one elevator leading from the mezzanine to the Shady Grove bound side of the platform. The station is compliant with the Americans with Disabilities Act of 1990. However, the station lacks backup elevators. In the event that the elevator to the platform is not operational, the station is not accessible and disabled users must take a shuttle to the next station.

This station, along with Forest Glen farther south and Fort Totten's lower level, has separate tunnels and platforms for each direction, instead of the large, vaulted common room seen at most other underground stations in the Metro system; this design was used to save money due to the station's depth.
