= Forest Glen, Maryland =

- Census-designated place
- Location of Forest Glen, Maryland
- Coordinates: 39°01′08″N 77°02′41″W
- Country: United States
- State: Maryland
- County: Montgomery

Area
  - Total: 1.00 sq mi (2.60 km^{2})
  - Land: 1.00 sq mi (2.60 km^{2})
  - Water: 0.0039 sq mi (0.01 km^{2})
- Elevation: 371 ft (113 m)

Population (2020)
  - Total: 6,897
  - Density: 6,877.4/sq mi (2,655.36/km^{2})
- Time zone: UTC−5 (Eastern (EST))
  - Summer (DST): UTC−4 (EDT)
- FIPS code: 24-28640
- GNIS feature ID: 2389096

Forest Glen is a census-designated place (CDP) in Montgomery County, Maryland, United States. Its population was 6,897 as of the 2020 census.

== Geography ==
Forest Glen is recognized by the United States Census Bureau and the United States Geological Survey as a census-designated place. It is located just north of central Silver Spring, and just north of the Capital Beltway around Georgia Avenue.

According to the United States Census Bureau, the place has a total area of 1.3 square miles (3.4 km^{2}), all land, although Sligo Creek and several drainage ponds are located in the area.

== Demographics ==
Historical population
Census	Pop.	Note	%±
2000	7,344		—
2010	6,582		−10.4%
2020	6,897		4.8%
source:2000 2010–2020

=== 2020 census ===
As of the 2020 census, Forest Glen had a population of 6,897. The median age was 39.4 years. 24.4% of residents were under the age of 18 and 17.3% of residents were 65 years of age or older. For every 100 females there were 89.3 males, and for every 100 females age 18 and over there were 83.7 males age 18 and over.

100.0% of residents lived in urban areas, while 0.0% lived in rural areas.

There were 2,556 households in Forest Glen, of which 34.8% had children under the age of 18 living in them. Of all households, 49.5% were married-couple households, 14.9% were households with a male householder and no spouse or partner present, and 30.5% were households with a female householder and no spouse or partner present. About 27.5% of all households were made up of individuals and 13.8% had someone living alone who was 65 years of age or older.

There were 2,640 housing units, of which 3.2% were vacant. The homeowner vacancy rate was 0.7% and the rental vacancy rate was 3.7%.

Racial composition as of the 2020 census
Race	Number	Percent
White	3,408	49.4%
Black or African American	1,112	16.1%
American Indian and Alaska Native	46	0.7%
Asian	582	8.4%
Native Hawaiian and Other Pacific Islander	2	0.0%
Some other race	955	13.8%
Two or more races	792	11.5%
Hispanic or Latino (of any race)	1,550	22.5%

=== Demographic estimates ===
According to U.S. Census Bureau QuickFacts, 37.9% of residents age 5 and older spoke a language other than English at home, 6.3% of residents were under the age of 5, and the average household size was 2.70.

=== Education ===
65.2% of residents age 25 and older had a bachelor's degree or higher.

=== Income and poverty ===
The median household income was $127,820, the per capita income was $66,373, and 7.0% of the population was below the poverty line.

== Community ==
Forest Glen has access to many parks including Rock Creek Park and Sligo Creek Park. It is also home to the National Museum of Health and Medicine and a regional hospital, Holy Cross Hospital. The community is also served by the Friends of Forest Glen advocacy group. Forest Glen is also home to the National Park Seminary, a unique and landmark residential community in an old building complex.

== History ==
Forest Glen was once part of a land grant made in 1680 to one of Archbishop John Carroll's ancestors.

Daniel Carroll, one of the Founding Fathers of the United States, lived in Forest Glen. Carroll's body was buried in St. John the Evangelist Catholic Church Cemetery in Forest Glen. The church building was originally built as a wood-framed structure in 1774. It was replaced by a brick structure in 1894.

Racial covenants were used in the Woodside Knolls neighborhood of Forest Glen to exclude Black and Jewish residents. A 1939 covenant from Woodside Knolls states: "No part of the land above described shall ever be used or occupied by or sold demised, transferred unto, or in trust for, leased, or rented, or given to negroes, or any person or persons of negro blood extraction, or to any person of the Semitic race, blood or origin, which racial description shall be deemed to include Jews and Hebrews, except that this paragraph shall not be held to exclude partial occupancy of the premises by domestic servants of said races."

The Forest Estates neighborhood of Forest Glen was developed in the 1940s by Jewish real estate developers. The area was formerly rural. Forest Estates was desirable to white Jewish homeowners moving to the suburbs from the city, because some white Christian neighborhoods in Washington, D.C. used antisemitic and racist covenants in real estate to exclude Jews, as well as African-Americans and other people of color. Antisemitic covenants were not used in Forest Estates, however, some Jewish developers used anti-Black covenants to exclude African-Americans. In 1945, Forest Glen Homes purchased land formerly owned by the Getty family, who had farmed the land since 1883. The houses in Forest Estates began construction in 1947. The Forest Glen Homes real estate company included Leo Minskoff, Sadie Milestone, Philip Milestone, and several others. Other builders in Forest Glen included the Russian immigrant Nathan Brisker and the Italian immigrant Anthony Campitelli.

Forest Glen station was originally planned to be built above-ground, which would have required the demolition of about fifteen homes. After community opposition to the above-ground station, Montgomery County approved a modified plan for an underground station. The community also opposed the originally planned location for the station, on the east side of Georgia Avenue between Sherwood Road and Tilton Drive. The station opened on September 22, 1990. Forest Glen station is 160 feet (49 m) below ground, the deepest train station in the Metrorail system.

Forest Glen has been the subject of redevelopment for many years. In 2017, Montgomery County Park and Planning Commission began the consolidated Forest Glen/Montgomery Hills sector plan review.

In 2018, WMATA announced that it would do a feasibility study on the redevelopment of the 8-acre (32,000 m^{2}) parking lot of Forest Glen station.
