= Columbia Heights =

Columbia Heights may refer to one of these United States locations:

- Columbia Heights (Washington, D.C.), a neighborhood of Washington, D.C.
  - Columbia Heights (WMATA station), a Metro station in Washington, D.C.
- Columbia Heights, Minnesota, a city in Anoka County
- Columbia Heights, Brooklyn, a street in New York City
- Columbia Heights (Oregon), a mountain in Umatilla County near Milton-Freewater
- Columbia Heights, Columbia County, Oregon, a populated place near St. Helens, Oregon
