= Georgia Avenue =

Street in NW Washington, DC, and Maryland, US

Coordinates: 38°59′05″N 77°01′36″W

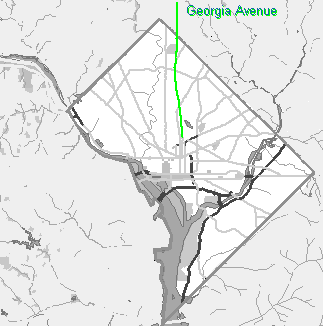
Small grayscale map of Washington DC showing Georgia Avenue

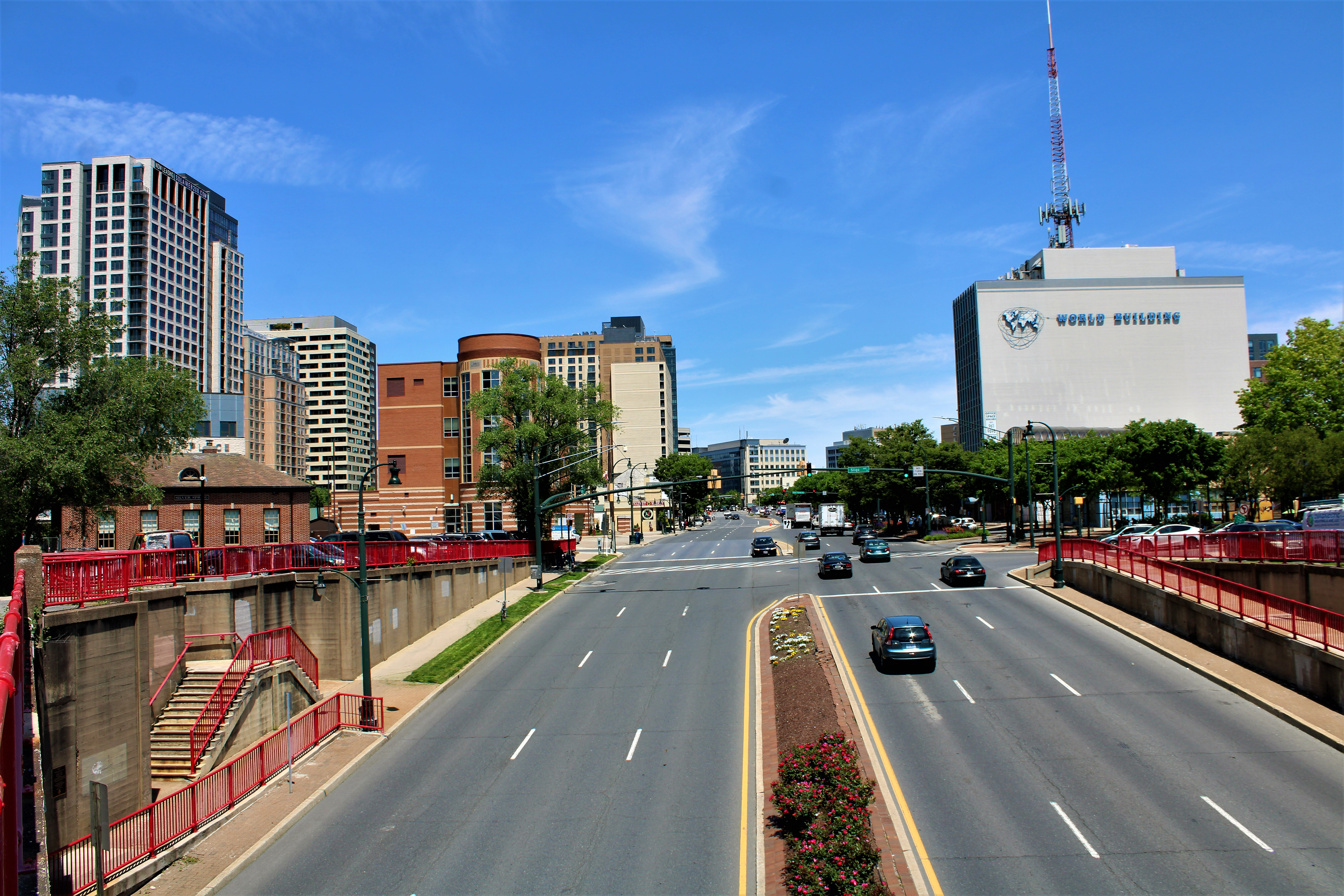
Georgia Avenue (US 29) heading north in Silver Spring, Maryland

Georgia Avenue is a major north-south artery in Northwest Washington, D.C., and Montgomery County, Maryland. In Washington, D.C., and for a short distance in Silver Spring, Maryland, Georgia Avenue is also U.S. Route 29. Howard University is located on Georgia Avenue.

== Geography ==
Georgia Avenue begins north of Florida Avenue, which was the boundary of the Old City, and is a continuation of 7th Street. Traveling northward, the street passes Howard University and Fort Stevens. At Eastern Avenue, the road crosses into Montgomery County and passes through Silver Spring.

Where it crosses Colesville Road a mile into Maryland, Georgia Avenue splits off U.S. Route 29 and becomes Maryland State Highway 97. Georgia Avenue ends at the boundary with Howard County, where it becomes Roxbury Mills Road. The total length of the road is about 24 miles (39 km), of which 5 miles (8 km) are in Washington, D.C.

== History ==
The original Georgia Avenue was the road now named Potomac Avenue in Southwest and Southeast. Current-day Georgia Avenue was originally named 7th Street Extended and Brightwood Avenue.

Seventh Street Pike was built as a plank road from Boundary Avenue (now Florida Avenue) to the District Line in 1852. Being a plank road, it was essentially paved with wooden planks that had to be replaced periodically due to rotting. The road was also known as Brightwood Avenue.

A tollgate was located at current-day 6400 Georgia Avenue, at the corner of Georgia Avenue and Piney Branch Road NW. Prominent residents living north of the tollgate decided to buy enough land to build a road to bypass the tollgate; this road became Piney Branch Road NW.

The road was also the path of the Seventh Street Railway, which took riders from Brightwood to downtown. The railway consisted of cars drawn by horses, guided by metal tracks that protruded above the road. On April 12, 1890, Seventh Street Railway became electrically powered; its cable cars were powered by overhead electrical lines, and the cars themselves were guided by metal tracks embedded in the road. Other electrically powered railways were built elsewhere in the District in later years.

In 1906, Georgia's senator Augustus O. Bacon was so dismayed that Georgia Avenue had become so neglected that he proposed to rename it Navy Yard Avenue and at the same time change the name of Brightwood Avenue to Georgia Avenue. The Washington Evening Star editorialized against the bill. While Senator Bacon's proposal did not come to fruition, Wisconsin's senator John Coit Spooner offered the same proposal again in 1907, which also included changing the name of 16th Street to Washington Avenue.

Renaming of Brightwood Avenue was opposed by residents of Brightwood and Park View. The Business Men's Association also opposed the bill, saying it opposed the renaming of any avenue that was named in the original plan of the city. The street renaming was stricken from the bill during the reconciliation process.

In 1908, Senator Bacon proposed the street renaming again. The bill was opposed by residents of Brightwood, Brightwood Park, Takoma, and Petworth, the Southeast Washington Citizens' Association, and the East Washington Citizens' Association.

The Washington Evening Star also editorialized against the bill again, arguing that changing the name of Brightwood Avenue "would remove all local significance from the name" and confuse those living in the neighborhood around what was then Georgia Avenue. The 1908 appropriations bill ended up changing the name of Georgia Avenue to Potomac Avenue and Brightwood Avenue to Georgia Avenue.

The portion between Glenmont and Norbeck was built in 1927.

== Future ==
The Montgomery County Planning Board is undertaking a concept study to provide "a design framework for future master plans and projects from the District of Columbia to Howard County." The study covers each neighborhood in the corridor, examining pedestrian safety, urban design, and public transportation issues.

== Event ==
Every June, Washington holds the D.C. Caribbean Carnival, which includes a parade down the lower portion of Georgia Avenue, an area that is home to many Caribbean immigrants.

== Transit service ==
=== Metrorail ===
Starting just north of the Silver Spring station, the Washington Metro Red Line runs roughly parallel to Georgia Avenue.

Metrorail stations on or near Georgia Avenue, from south to north, include:

==== Washington DC ====
- Shaw-Howard University
  Green Line
- Georgia Ave-Petworth
  Green Line

==== Maryland ====
- Silver Spring
  Red Line
- Forest Glen
  Red Line
- Wheaton
  Red Line
- Glenmont
  Red Line

=== Metrobus ===
The following Metrobus routes travel along the street (listed from south to north):

- D40 (Silver Spring station to 7th St.)
- D4X (Limited stop service from the Silver Spring station to 7th St.)
- C75 (Kansas Ave. to New Hampshire Ave.)
- D74 (Upshur St. to New Hampshire Ave.)
- M20, M22 (Olney-Sandy Spring Rd. to Silver Spring station)

=== Ride On ===
The following Ride On routes travel along the street (listed from south to north):

- 28 VanGo Circulator (Southbound only from Bonifant St. to 13th St.)
- 33 (Glenmont station to Arcola Ave.)
- 51 (Hewitt Ave. to Glenmont station)
- 53 (Prince Philip Dr. to Glenmont station, express south of Norbeck Rd.)
- 52 (Both directions from Olney-Sandy Spring Rd. to Hines Rd.; northbound only from Norbeck Rd. to Hines Rd.)

=== MARC ===
The following MARC train stop lies near the street:

- Silver Spring
  Brunswick Line

== In popular culture ==
The music video for the Wale song Chillin was filmed on Georgia Avenue.

The first three missions in the video game Syphon Filter were set in Georgia Avenue.

In the Alice McKinley book series, Alice’s dad managed a fictional store on Georgia Avenue.
