= Shaw–Howard University station =

Washington Metro station

Coordinates: 38.912919°N 77.022194°W

Shaw–Howard U
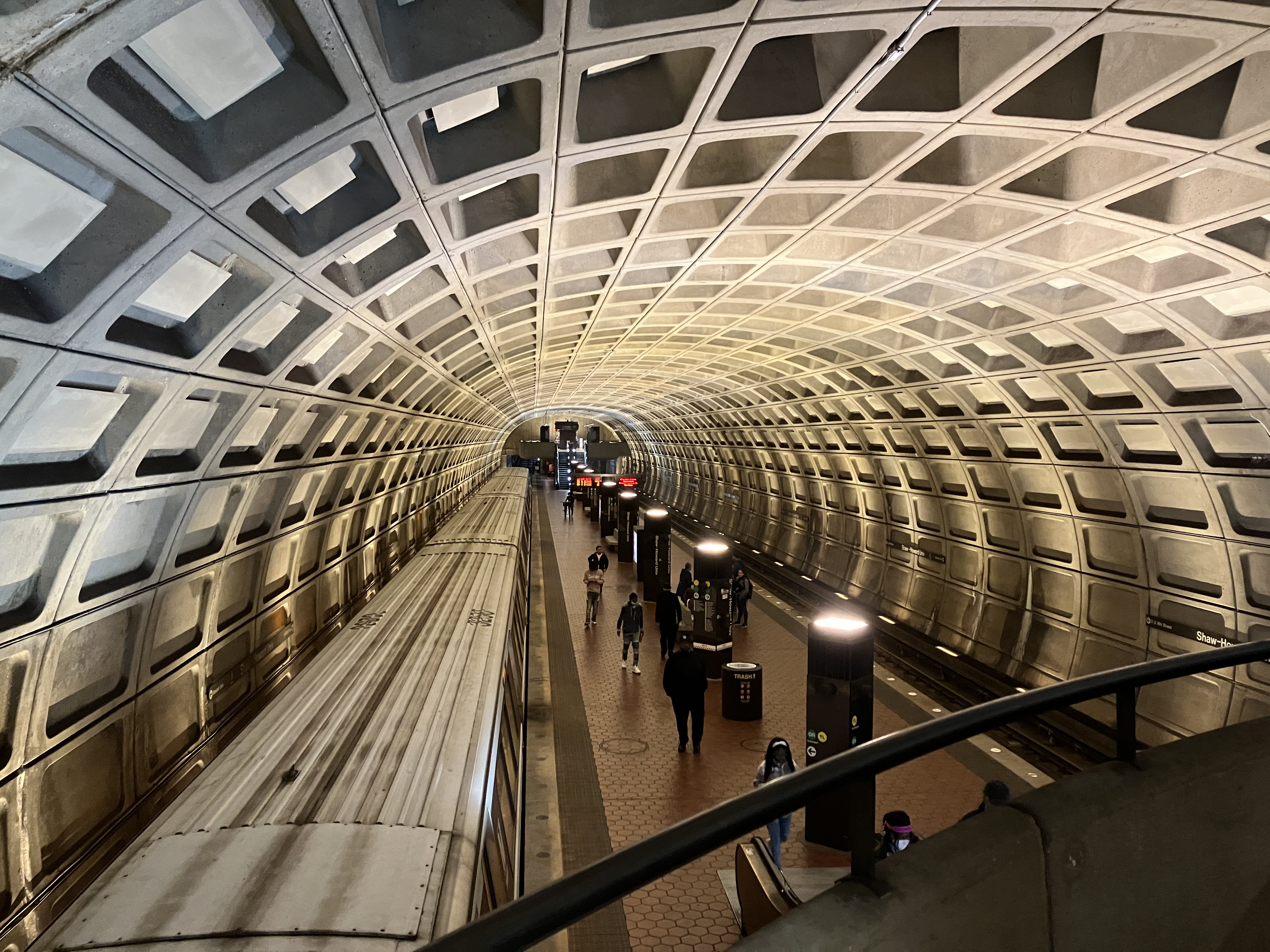
- Shaw-Howard University station in October 2022

General information
- Location: 1701 8th Street NW; Washington, D.C.
- Owner: Washington Metropolitan Area Transit Authority
- Platforms: 1 island platform
- Tracks: 2
- Connections: Metrobus: C51, C53, C57, C91, D32, D40, D4X

Construction
- Structure type: Underground
- Cycle facilities: Capital Bikeshare, 6 racks
- Accessible: Yes

Other information
- Station code: E02

History
- Opened: May 11, 1991
- Former names: Shaw

Passengers
- 2025: 4,050 (average weekday)
- Rank: 44 of 98

Services
Preceding station	Washington Metro	Following station
Mount Vernon Square toward Huntington	Yellow Line	U Street toward Greenbelt
Mount Vernon Square toward Branch Avenue	Green Line	U Street toward Greenbelt
Route map
Location

Shaw–Howard University station is a Washington Metro station in Washington, D.C., on the Green Line and Yellow Line. The station primarily serves Washington's Shaw neighborhood, the home of Howard University.

The station is located within the neighborhood of the same name in the Northwest quadrant of the city, on 7th Street between R and S Streets. It lies just outside the defined boundaries of the Shaw Historic District, which encompasses much the area to the southwest.

== Station layout ==
Like most underground Metro stations, Shaw–Howard University is an island-platformed station lying directly below street level. There are two entrances, one to the north at the corner of 7th and S Streets and the other to the south on R Street between 7th and 8th Streets.

== Transit-oriented development ==
Like other stations along the stretch of the Green Line between Gallery Place and Fort Totten, Shaw has been revitalized by transit-oriented development, increasing economic development, residential density, and—controversially—accelerating the pace of gentrification.

Among other projects, Progression Place and CityMarket at O catalyzed development in the area in the early 2010s. The former occupies previously vacant land on the same block as the northern entrance to the station. It contains 115,000 sq ft (10,700 m^{2}) of office space (with the UNCF being the anchor tenant), 205 apartments labeled as "7th Flats," and 19,000 sq ft (1,800 m^{2}) of retail.

CityMarket at O, located between 7th, 9th, O, and P Streets NW, renovated the long-neglected O Street Market and added 87,000 sq ft (8,100 m^{2}) of retail and 629 residential units.

== History ==
Part of the original Metro plan, the station was initially referred to simply as "Shaw". It opened on May 11, 1991, as part of a northward extension of the Green Line from Gallery Place–Chinatown to U Street. The central route under 7th Street, below which the station sits, was added in 1967 primarily to serve the "inner city." The downtown segment of the line was initially projected to open in September 1977, but the first Green Line stations did not open until 1991. While a cut-and-fill tunnel for the Green Line was built under 7th Street and U Street, maintaining vehicle traffic and pedestrian access on those streets was difficult.

On May 7, 2023, the northeastern terminus of the Yellow Line was truncated from Greenbelt to Mount Vernon Square, following its reopening after a nearly eight-month-long major rehabilitation project on its bridge over the Potomac River and its tunnel leading into L'Enfant Plaza. Some Yellow Line service was re-extended to Greenbelt on December 31, 2025.
