= North Capitol Street Line =

Bus route in Washington, D.C., United States

D30
- North Capitol Street Line

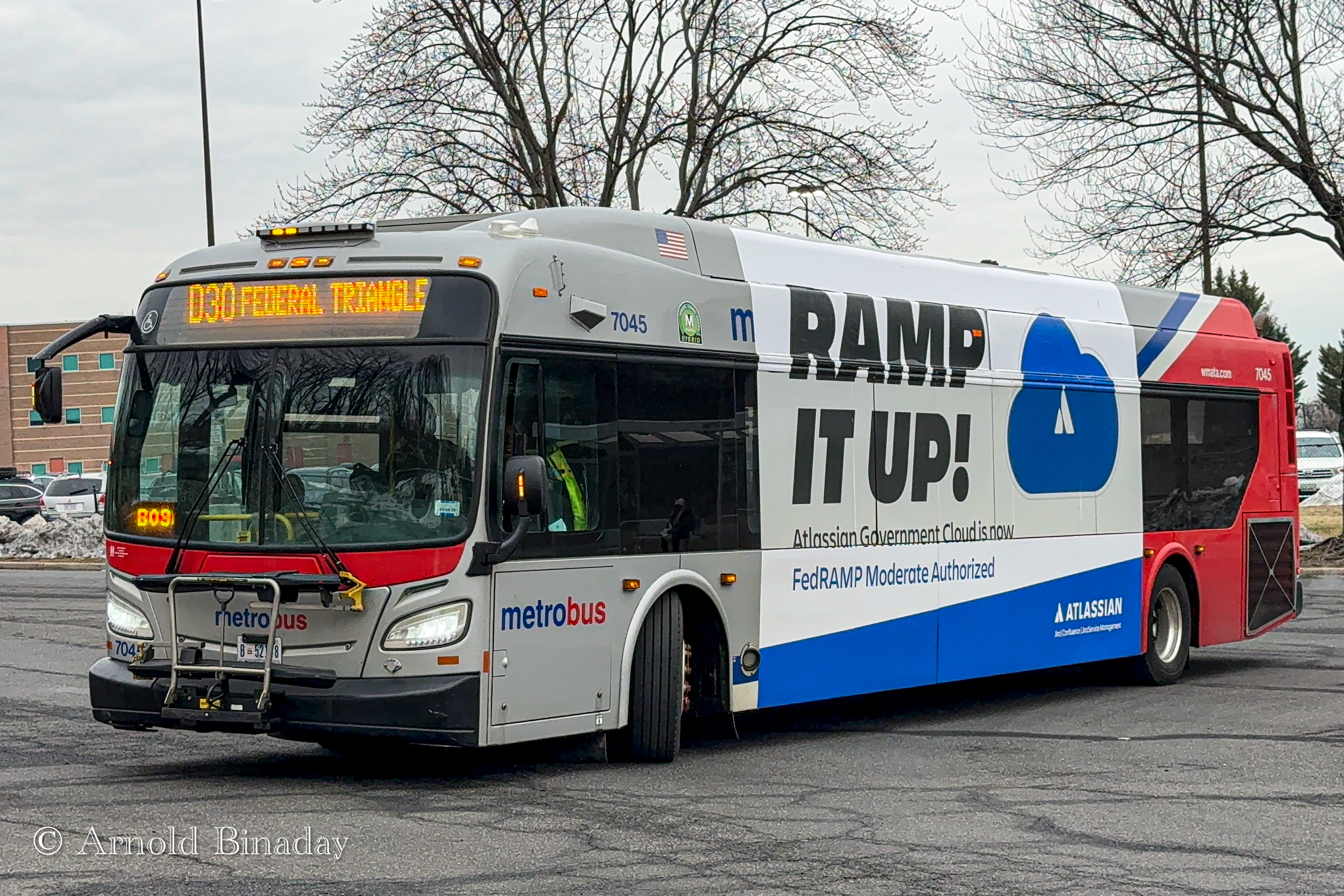
- Route D30 at Fort Totten station

Overview
- System: Metrobus
- Operator: Washington Metropolitan Area Transit Authority
- Garage: Bladensburg
- Livery: Local
- Status: In Service
- Began service: 1872
- Predecessors: 80

Route
- Locale: Southwest, Northwest, Northeast
- Communities served: Fort Totten, Brookland, Stronghold, Truxton Circle, NoMa, Judiciary Square, Chinatown, Downtown, Federal Triangle
- Landmarks served: Fort Totten station, Providence Hospital, Brookland station, Basilica of the National Shrine of the Immaculate Conception, Catholic University of America, Trinity Washington University, Government Publishing Office, Washington Union Station, Union Station, Judiciary Square station, Gallery Place station, Capital One Arena, Metro Center station, Federal Triangle station, L'Enfant Plaza station
- Start: Fort Totten station
- Via: 12th Street NE, Michigan Avenue NE, North Capitol Street, E Street NW
- End: Federal Triangle; L'Enfant Plaza station (D & 7th Streets SW) (Late nights)

Service
- Level: Daily
- Frequency: 15-20 minutes
- Operates: 24 Hours
- Ridership: 1,746,495 (FY 2025)
- Transfers: SmarTrip only
- Timetable: North Capitol Street Line

The North Capitol Street Line, designated as Route D30 is a daily bus route that is operated by the Washington Metropolitan Area Transit Authority between Fort Totten station of the Red, Green and Yellow Lines of the Washington Metro and Federal Triangle in Downtown Washington, D.C., with late night and early morning trips extending to L'Enfant Plaza station which is served by the Blue, Orange, Silver, Green and Yellow Lines of the Washington Metro. The line operates every 15 minutes during the day and every 20 minutes at night.

== Background ==
Route D30 operates between Fort Totten station and Federal Triangle with late night and early morning trips extending to L'Enfant Plaza station providing service along North Capitol Street. The route was one of the most popular routes, with having 4,594 average weekday ridership in 2023. Route D30 operates out of Bladensburg division.

=== Route D30 stops ===
Bus stop	Direction	Connections
Fort Totten Bus Bay E	Southbound stop	Metrobus: C71, C77, C81, D44, M60, M6X, P15, P16, P32, P35; Washington Metro:
Fort Totten Alighting Only	Northbound terminal	Metrobus: C71, C77, C81, D44, M60, M6X, P15, P16, P32, P35; Washington Metro:
Galloway Street NE / 4th Street NE	Southbound	Metrobus: C81 (Westbound only), P32, P35
Galloway Street NE / South Dakota Avenue NE	Northbound	Metrobus: C81 (Westbound only), P32, P35
South Dakota Avenue NE / Farragut Place NE	Bidirectional	Metrobus: P32, P35
South Dakota Avenue NE / Delafield Street NE	Southbound	
South Dakota Avenue NE / Emerson Street NE	Northbound	
South Dakota Avenue NE / Decatur Street NE	Bidirectional	
12th Street NE / Buchanan Street NE	Southbound	
12th Street NE / Allison Street NE	Northbound	
12th Street NE / Varnum Street NE	Bidirectional	
12th Street NE / Taylor Street NE	Bidirectional	
12th Street NE / Michigan Avenue NE	Bidirectional	Metrobus: P33
12th Street NE / Quincy Street NE	Bidirectional	
12th Street NE / Perry Street NE	Bidirectional	
12th Street NE / Newton Street NE	Northbound	Metrobus: C63, D34, D74
12th Street NE / Monroe Street NE	Southbound	Metrobus: C63, D34, D74
Brookland Bus Bays D & J	Bidirectional	Metrobus: C61, C63, D34, D74, P33; CUA Shuttle: Blue, Green; Washington Metro: ACHS Shuttle: Brookland Metro; Metropolitan Branch Trail
Monroe Street NE / 7th Street NE	Bidirectional	Metrobus: C61, C63, D34
Michigan Avenue NE / Gibbons Hall Catholic University of America	Southbound	Metrobus: C61, C63
Michigan Avenue NE / 4th Street NE	Northbound	Metrobus: C61, C63
Michigan Avenue NE / Irving Street NE	Bidirectional	Metrobus: C61, C63
Michigan Avenue NE / Franklin Street NE	Bidirectional	Metrobus: C61, C63
Michigan Avenue NE / North Capitol Street NE	Northbound	Metrobus: C61, C63, D36
North Capitol Street NW / Girard Street NE	Southbound	Metrobus: C61, C63, D36
North Capitol Street NE / Evarts Street NE	Northbound	
North Capitol Street NW / Douglas Street NE	Southbound	
North Capitol Street NW / Channing Street NW	Southbound	
North Capitol Street NE / Channing Street NE	Northbound	
North Capitol Street NW / Bryant Street NW	Southbound	
North Capitol Street NE / Bryant Street NE	Northbound	
North Capitol Street NW / Adams Street NW	Southbound	
North Capitol Street NW / W Street NW	Southbound	
North Capitol Street NE / V Street NE	Northbound	
North Capitol Street NW / V Street NW	Southbound	
North Capitol Street NE / Rhode Island Avenue NE	Northbound	Metrobus: D32
North Capitol Street NW / Rhode Island Avenue NW	Southbound	Metrobus: D32
North Capitol Street NE / T Street NE	Northbound	
North Capitol Street NW / Randolph Place NW	Southbound	
North Capitol Street NE / Randolph Place NE	Northbound	
North Capitol Street NE / Florida Avenue NE	Northbound	Metrobus: C53, C57
North Capitol Street NW / Bates Street NW	Southbound	Metrobus: C53, C57
North Capitol Street NE / P Street NE/NW	Northbound	
North Capitol Street NE / N Street NE	Northbound	
North Capitol Street NW / M Street NE/NW	Northbound	
North Capitol Street NE / Pierce Street NE	Southbound	
North Capitol Street NE / K Street NE	Northbound	Metrobus: C71, D36
North Capitol Street NW / K Street NW	Southbound	Metrobus: C71, D36
North Capitol Street NE / I Street NE	Northbound	Metrobus: C71
North Capitol Street NW / H Street NW	Southbound	Metrobus: C71, D20, D2X
North Capitol Street NE / H Street NE	Northbound	Metrobus: C71, D20, D2X
North Capitol Street NE / Massachusetts Avenue NE Union Station	Northbound	Amtrak, VRE, MARC (at Union Station); Metrobus: C43, C51, C55, C71, D20, D24, D2X, D80; Washington Metro: MTA Maryland Bus: 903, 922; Loudoun County Transit; PRTC OmniRide
North Capitol Street NW / Massachusetts Avenue NW Union Station	Southbound	Amtrak, VRE, MARC (at Union Station); Metrobus: C43, C51, C55, C71, D20, D24, D2X, D80; Washington Metro: MTA Maryland Bus: 903, 922; Loudoun County Transit; PRTC OmniRide
North Capitol Street NE / E Street NE/NW	Northbound	Metrobus: C43, C51, C55, C71, D24, D80
E Street NW / New Jersey Avenue NW	Bidirectional	Metrobus: D24
E Street NW / 1st Street NW	Southbound	Metrobus: D24
E Street NW / 2nd Street NW	Northbound	Metrobus: D24
E Street NW / 4th Street NW Judiciary Square	Bidirectional	Metrobus: D24; Washington Metro:
E Street NW / 6th Street NW	Bidirectional	Metrobus: D24
E Street NW / 7th Street NW	Bidirectional	Metrobus: D20, D24, D2X, D34, D36, D40, D4X; Washington Metro: at Gallery Place
E Street NW / 8th Street NW	Northbound	Metrobus: D24, D2X, D94
E Street NW / 9th Street NW	Southbound	Metrobus: D24, D2X, D94
E Street NW / 11th Street NW Metro Center	Northbound	Metrobus: D32, D34, D44, D5X, D60, D6X, D94; Washington Metro:
10th Street NW / Pennsylvania Avenue NW Federal Triangle	Northbound stop, Southbound terminal Southbound (Late night & early morning only)	Metrobus: D10, D1X, D32, D44, D60, D6X; Washington Metro: at Federal Triangle
12th Street NW / Constitution Avenue NW Federal Triangle	Northbound	Metrobus: D10, D1X, D32, D44, D60, D6X; Washington Metro:
Constitution Avenue NW / 9th Street NW	Northbound (Late night & early morning only)	Metrobus: D1X, D32, D60
7th Street SW / Independence Avenue SW	Southbound (Late night & early morning only)	Metrobus: D1X, D40, D60
7th Street SW / Jefferson Drive SW	Northbound (Late night & early morning only)	Metrobus: D1X, D40, D60
7th Street SW / C Street SW L'Enfant Plaza	Southbound (Late night & early morning only)	Metrobus: D40, D60; Washington Metro:
7th Street SW / Maryland Avenue SW L'Enfant Plaza	Northbound (Late night & early morning only)	Metrobus: D40, D60; Washington Metro:
E Street SW / 7th Street SW	Northbound (Late night & early morning only)	Metrobus: A40, C11, C55, D40, D50, D60
D Street SW / 7th Street SW L'Enfant Plaza	Northbound stop, Southbound terminal (Late night & early morning only)	Metrobus: A40, C11, C55, D40, D50, D60; Washington Metro:

== History ==
Before WMATA implemented the Better Bus Redesign network, Route D30 was previously known as Route 80. Route 80 began service in 1872 as the North Capitol Street and College Park Line as a horsecar service.

The line was a mix of its current and the College Park Line, Operated along North Capitol Street and in College Park, Maryland via Brentwood.

After electric streetcars operated by the Metropolitan Railroad took over the city, the line was acquired in 1902 by the Washington Railway and Electric Company, which merged to become the Capital Traction Company in the 1930s, and operated as DC Transit after 1956. Just two years later on September 7, 1958, Routes 80 and 82 were abandoned, the first streetcar lines to be abandoned.

After DC Streetcars, Route 80 service on the North Capitol Street Streetcar Line, alongside 81 between Brookland & Potomac Park. it was later extended to Riggs Road NE, via 12th Street NE and South Dakota Avenue NE during the early 1970s although both routes were eventually truncated to the Fort Totten Metro Station on February 19, 1978, shortly after it opened.

Route 81 operated as a part of the Line until 1996/1997 when it became a part of the College Park Line, operating between Rhode Island Avenue-Brentwood station and Cherry Hill via Greenbelt station.

During the COVID-19 pandemic, the line was reduced to operate on its Saturday supplemental schedule beginning on March 16, 2020. However beginning on March 18, 2020, the line was further reduced to operate on its Sunday schedule. Weekend service was also suspended beginning on March 21, 2020. The line restored its full schedule beginning on August 23, 2020.

In February 2021 during WMATA's FY2022 budget crisis, WMATA proposed to cutback the 80 from the Kennedy Center to McPherson Square station and add late-night service to 2:00 AM between July and December 2021 in the first half of the fiscal year. In the second half of the fiscal year between January to June 2022, WMATA proposed to reroute the 80 to terminate at Federal Triangle station, from the intersection of North Capitol Street NW & Massachusetts Avenue NW to operate over E Street and 10th Street to partially replace the D6. Service after midnight would also be eliminated Subsequently on April 22, 2021, WMATA approved the FY2022 budget and received federal funding to avoid service changes.

On June 6, 2021, late-night service was increased to operate up to 2:00 AM.

On June 10, 2021, WMATA proposed to increase the 80 to operate every 12 minutes daily between 7:00 AM to 9:00 PM daily as part of WMATA's Pandemic Recovery Plan. However the proposed cutback from The Kennedy Center to McPherson Square station was brought back. Service to Kennedy Center would be replaced by Routes 42 and 43.

On September 5, 2021, the line was shorten to operate up to McPherson Square station and service to Kennedy Center was replaced by routes 42 and 43. Service was also increased to operate every 12 minutes daily.

Due to rising cases of the COVID-19 Omicron variant, the line was reduced to its Saturday service on weekdays with Route 31 being suspended. Full weekday service and all Route 31 service resumed on February 7, 2022.

Early morning and late night service was extended to Foggy Bottom station on June 25, 2023.

As of December 17, 2023, the route now operates 24/7.

In WMATA's FY2025, they proposed terminating Route 80 at Washington Union Station instead of McPherson Square, eliminating service on service along H Street, I Street, K Street, 15th Street, 13th Street, Pennsylvania Avenue, and Massachusetts Avenue. It was also proposed Route 80 would be moved into the 20-minute Frequent Service Network, rather than the 12-minute Frequent Service Network from 7 a.m. to 9 p.m. every day of the week. However on April 25, 2024, Metro’s Board of Directors approved a $4.8 billion capital and operating budget which avoided the service changes.

=== Better Bus Redesign ===
In 2022, WMATA launched its Better Bus Redesign project, which aimed to redesign the entire Metrobus Network and is the first full redesign of the agency's bus network in its history.

In April 2023, WMATA launched its Draft Visionary Network. As part of the drafts, WMATA proposed to keep the 80 mostly the same, renaming it to Route DC110, except the route would travel along E Street NW instead of H Street NW.

During WMATA's Revised Draft Visionary Network, WMATA renamed the DC110 to Route D30 and originally kept the routing the same. However the route was then rerouted to serve Federal Triangle station via 12th Street NW and 10th Street NW. Late night service would then be extended to L'Enfant Plaza station via Constitution Avenue NW and 7th Street NW. All changes were then proposed during WMATA's 2025 Proposed Network.

On November 21, 2024, WMATA approved its Better Bus Redesign Network.

Beginning on June 29, 2025, Route 80 was mostly kept the same, but it was modified to operate along E Street NW and terminate at Federal Triangle instead of McPherson Square. Late night service was extended to L'Enfant Plaza station. The line was renamed into the D30.
