= Fort Totten station =

Washington Metro station

Fort Totten
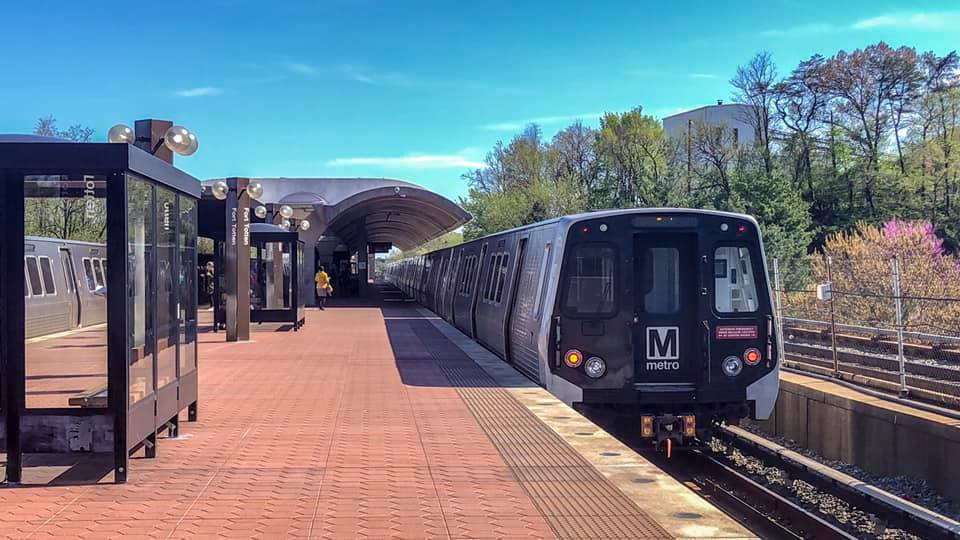
- Red Line trains serving the upper level in April 2019

General information
- Location: 550 Galloway Street NE; Washington, D.C.
- Coordinates: 38.951777°N 77.002174°W
- Owner: Washington Metropolitan Area Transit Authority
- Platforms: 2 island platforms (1 per level)
- Tracks: 4 (2 per level)
- Connections: Metrobus: C71, C77, C81, D30, D44, M60, M6X, P15, P16, P32, P35

Construction
- Structure type: Red Line: Elevated; Green/Yellow Line: Below grade
- Platform levels: 2
- Parking: 408 spaces
- Cycle facilities: Capital Bikeshare, 10 racks and 6 lockers
- Accessible: Yes

Other information
- Station code: B06 (upper level); E06 (lower level)

History
- Opened: February 6, 1978

Passengers
- 2025: 7,324 (average weekday)
- Rank: 18 of 98

Services
Preceding station	Washington Metro	Following station
Brookland–CUA toward Shady Grove	Red Line	Takoma toward Glenmont
Georgia Avenue–Petworth toward Huntington	Yellow Line	West Hyattsville toward Greenbelt
Georgia Avenue–Petworth toward Branch Avenue	Green Line	West Hyattsville toward Greenbelt
Route map
Location

Fort Totten station is a Washington Metro station in northeastern Washington, D.C. It is one of the four major transfer points on the Metrorail system. It acts as a transfer point between the Green, Yellow and Red Lines. It is the last station on the Green and Yellow Lines in the District of Columbia before heading into Maryland and the second to last for the Red Line. It is one of two stations (the other being Arlington Cemetery) with three levels (the entrance and exit are on the second floor between the three lines), and is doubly unique in being the only multi-level transfer station built above ground and being the only such station to have island platforms on both levels as opposed to just the lower level. The station's name comes from a Civil War-era fortification which itself was named after General Joseph Gilbert Totten, the Chief Engineer of the antebellum US Army.

The station is located in the middle of Fort Totten Park in Northeast, serving the neighborhoods of Fort Totten to the west and Queens Chapel to the east. The station also serves the adjacent neighborhoods of Riggs Park, North Michigan Park, and Michigan Park in Northeast D.C., the Manor Park neighborhood of Northwest, and the Maryland neighborhood of Chillum.

== Station layout ==
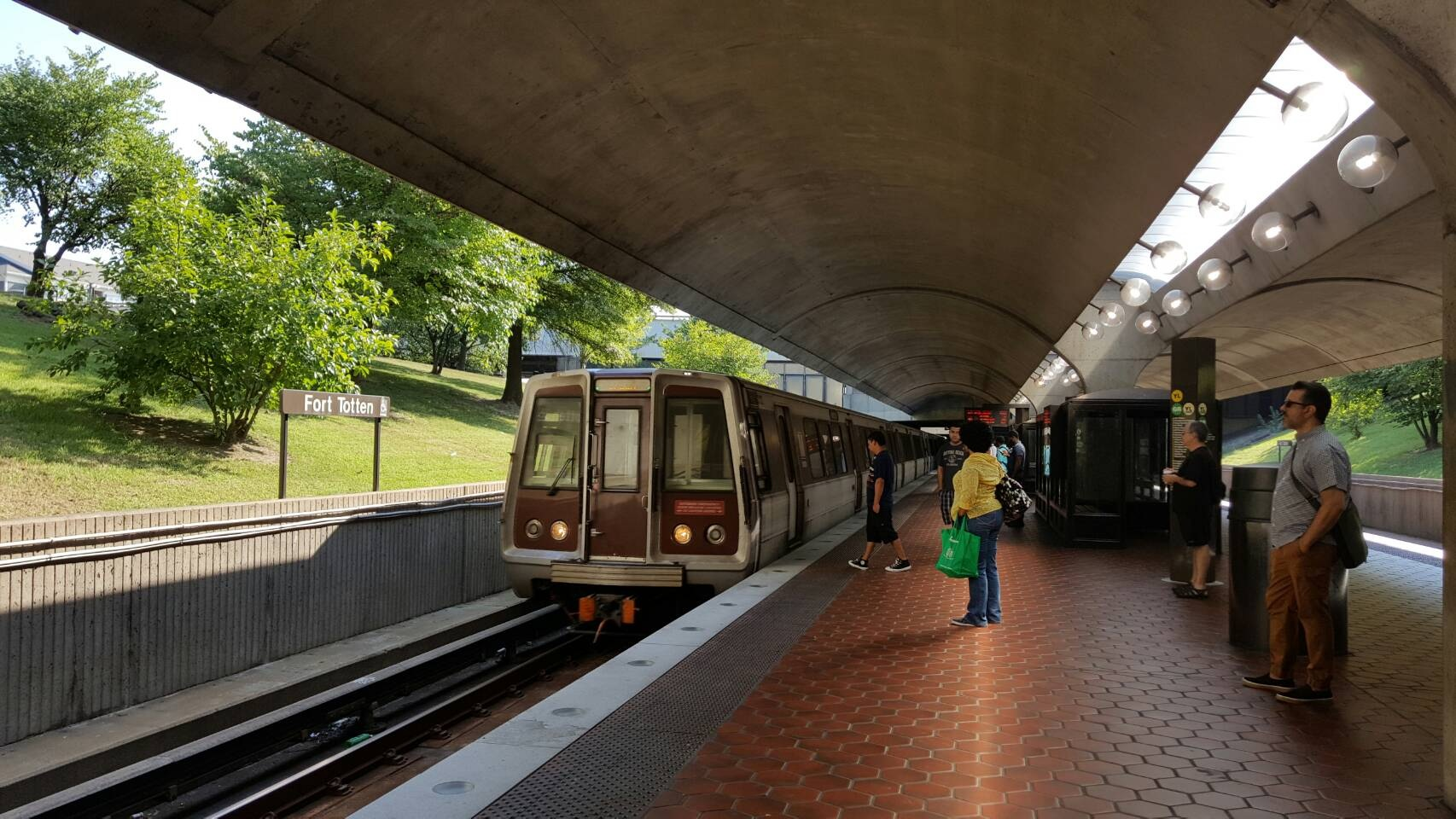
Station's lower level platform in September 2016 facing northbound with southbound Green Line train arriving

The lower-level platform for the Green and Yellow Lines is unique in that it is built into a hillside, part underground in a rock tunnel, and part at ground level in an open cut and has separate tunnels and platforms for each direction, instead of the large, vaulted common room seen at most other underground stations in the Metro system like at Forest Glen and Wheaton; this design was used to save money due to the station's depth. A single-track connection east of the station allows trains to be moved between the Red and Green Lines and was once used for the Green Line Commuter Shortcut service to Farragut North via the Red Line tracks before the mid-city segment of the Green Line was completed in September 1999.

Like Brookland-CUA, Takoma, and Silver Spring, the Red Line tracks at Fort Totten are located in the middle of the CSX Metropolitan Subdivision rail line. There are two tracks to either side of the island platform, with Metro trains using the inner tracks and all freight, Amtrak and MARC Trains using the outer tracks, though neither one makes stops.

Access to the station is provided from Galloway Street NE, which connects to South Dakota Avenue NE to the east and Riggs Road NE to the north.

== History ==
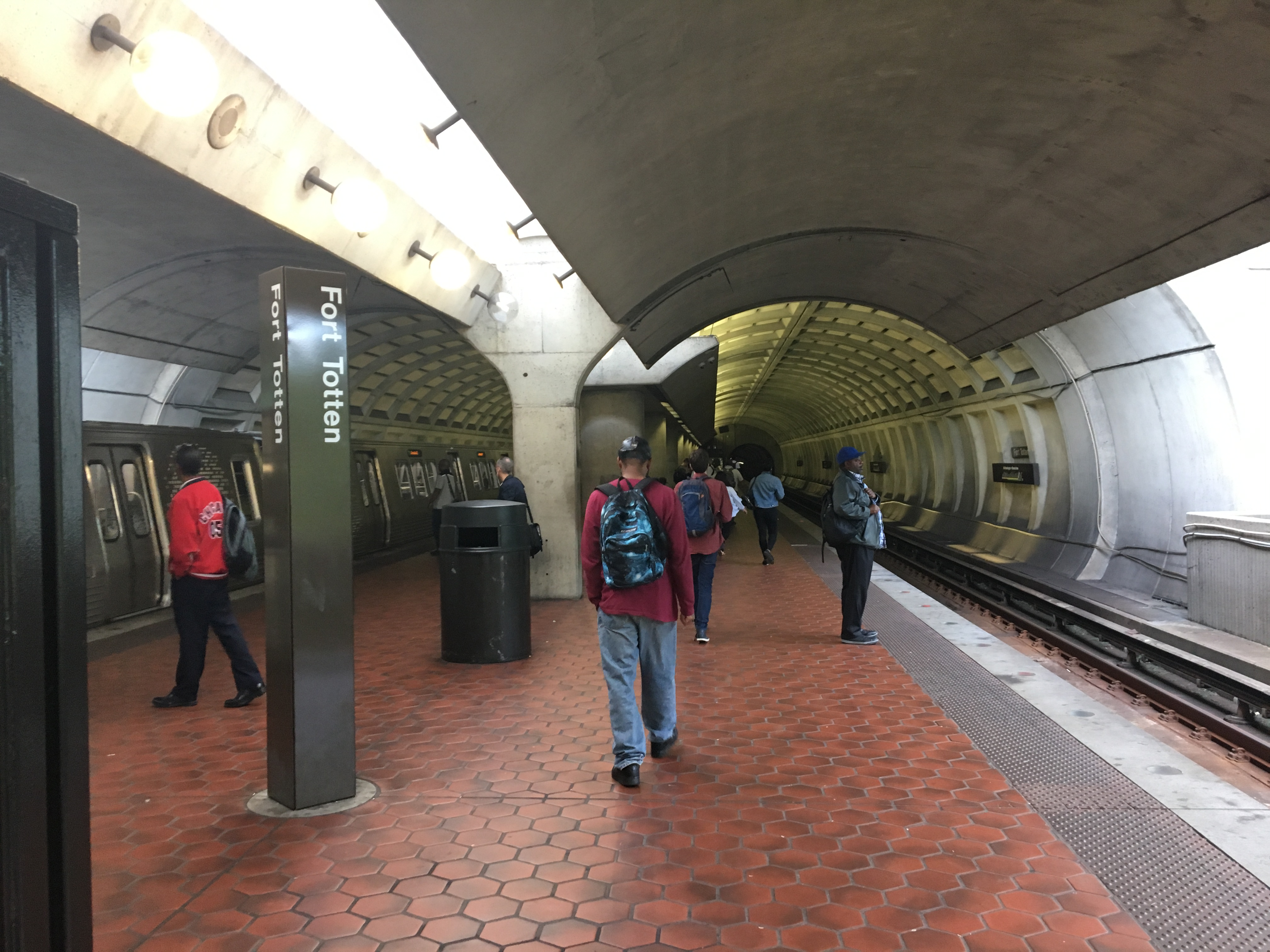
Lower level in September 2017, looking southbound with northbound Green Line train servicing the platform

Service began on the Red Line (upper) platform on February 6, 1978, and on the Green Line (lower) platform on December 11, 1993.

The initial, southern section of the Green Line, between the Anacostia and U Street stations, opened roughly two years earlier, in December 1991. The northern portion, between the Greenbelt and Fort Totten stations, was completed on December 11, 1993. Between December 1993 and September 1999, the Green Line operated as two separate, unconnected segments because the line between Fort Totten and U Street had not been completed. The underground platform at Fort Totten served as the northern and southern terminus until the mid-city Georgia Avenue–Petworth and Columbia Heights stations opened. Passengers traveling between the two Green Line sections had to transfer to Red Line trains at Fort Totten's upper level to continue their journey to Downtown Washington, D.C. However, to eliminate this transfer, during weekday rush hour peak commuter times between January 1997 and September 1999, the Washington Metropolitan Area Transit Authority (WMATA) operated the Green Line Commuter Shortcut that bypassed Fort Totten station and used an underground connection to the Red Line and served all stations up to Farragut North in Downtown. The Commuter Shortcut was discontinued in September 1999 when the northern and southern portions of the Green Line were connected, and the Georgia Avenue–Petworth and Columbia Heights stations opened.

On June 22, 2009, two southbound Metro trains on the Red Line collided between Takoma and Fort Totten, killing nine and injuring 80, the deadliest accident in the system's history. A plaque in the station's mezzanine commemorates the victims of the crash. A plan to create a memorial outside the station has been proposed, as the current sign was felt to be insensitive by the victims' families.

On December 31, 2006, as part of an 18-month trial, WMATA decided to extend the Yellow Line north of its original terminus at the Mount Vernon Square to Fort Totten outside weekday rush hour/peak period commuter times. Signage was replaced at all Green Line Stations between Mount Vernon Square and Fort Totten to reflect this change between December 4, 2006, and January 1, 2007. On June 26, 2008, due to the success of the 18-month trial of the Yellow Line Extension to Fort Totten, WMATA decided to permanently extend the Yellow Line to operate up to Fort Totten at all other times, except during peak hours.

Eventually, in June 2012, as part of the Metro Rush Plus program trial, Yellow Line trains were extended further north of Fort Totten to operate up to Greenbelt during the weekday rush hour. These services were discontinued on June 25, 2017 due to budget cuts.

On May 25, 2019, the Yellow Line was extended to operate to Greenbelt at all times instead of terminating at Fort Totten during off-peak hours and Mount Vernon Square during peak hours.

On May 7, 2023, the northeastern terminus of the Yellow Line was truncated from Greenbelt to Mount Vernon Square, following its reopening after a nearly eight-month-long major rehabilitation project on its bridge over the Potomac River and its tunnel leading into L'Enfant Plaza. Half of Yellow Line service was re-extended to Greenbelt on December 31, 2025.
