= Silver Spring station =

Washington Metro and MARC Train station

Silver Spring
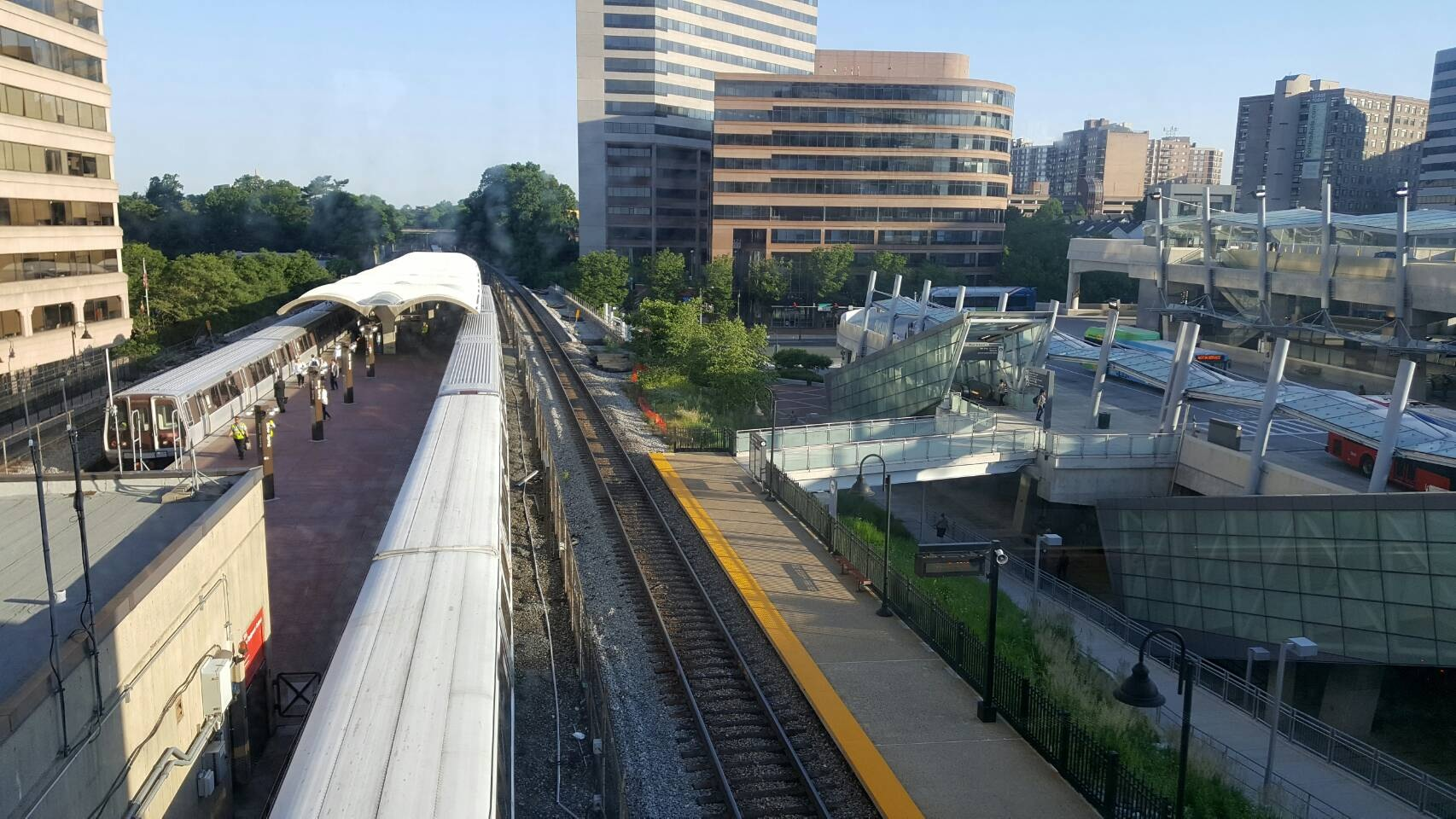
- The Metro and MARC (top) and Purple Line (bottom) platforms

General information
- Location: 8400 Colesville Road; 1170 Bonifant Street; Silver Spring, Maryland
- Coordinates: 38.993841°N 77.031321°W
- Owner: Washington Metropolitan Area Transit Authority (Metro station); Maryland Transit Administration (MARC and Purple Line stations)
- Line: Metropolitan Subdivision
- Platforms: 1 island platform (Metro); 2 side platforms (MARC); 2 side platforms (Purple Line – future)
- Tracks: 4 (2 each for Metro and MARC); 2 (Purple Line – future)
- Connections: Metrobus: C87, D40, D4X, D60, D6X, M20, M52, M54, M70, P30; Ride On: 1, 2, 4, 5, 8, 9, 11, 12, 13, 14, 15, 16, 17, 18, 19, 20, 21, 22, 28, Flash BRT (Blue, Orange); MTA Maryland Bus: 915, 929; Shuttle-UM: 111; Peter Pan Bus

Construction
- Structure type: Elevated
- Parking: 715 spaces (leased)
- Cycle facilities: Capital Bikeshare, 26 racks, 30 lockers
- Accessible: Yes

Other information
- Station code: B08

History
- Opened: February 6, 1978

Passengers
- 2025: 7,354 (average weekday) (Metro)
- Rank: 16 of 98 (Metro)

Services
Preceding station	MARC	Following station
Kensington toward Martinsburg or Frederick	Brunswick Line	Union Station Terminus
Kensington toward Brunswick	Brunswick Line limited service	College Park toward Camden Station
Preceding station	Washington Metro	Following station
Takoma toward Shady Grove	Red Line	Forest Glen toward Glenmont
Future services
Preceding station	Maryland Transit Administration	Following station
16th Street–Woodside toward Bethesda	Purple Line	Silver Spring Library toward New Carrollton
Route map
Location

Silver Spring station is a train station in Montgomery County, Maryland on the Red Line of the Washington Metro and the Brunswick Line of the MARC Train commuter rail system. The Metro station averaged 4,536 daily riders in 2023, making it the 19th-busiest stop in the network and the busiest in the state of Maryland. Trains travelling south from the station quickly cross the border into Washington, D.C., while northbound trains head underground and make their way further into Montgomery County.

Silver Spring station mainly serves the populous suburb of Silver Spring and is located east of the intersection between Colesville Road (Route 384) and East-West Highway (Route 410). In addition to rail service, several Metrobus and Ride On bus routes also serve the station at the Paul S. Sarbanes Transit Center, formerly known as the Silver Spring Transit Center.

It will be a stop for the Purple Line light rail system, which is currently under construction.

== History ==
Red Line service at Silver Spring began on February 6, 1978. Prior to the opening of Forest Glen on September 22, 1990, Silver Spring was the northeastern terminus of the Red Line. MARC trains began service in this location in 2003, replacing the previous Silver Spring station, located about .25 miles (0.40 km) to the south.

On July 7, 2020, a 7000-series train derailed at low speed on the southbound track as it was leaving the station. There were no injuries. An investigation is underway to determine the cause.

As of 2026 the Purple Line system is under construction and is scheduled to open in late 2027.

=== Bus station ===
On September 26, 2008, there was a groundbreaking ceremony that took place at the Silver Spring Metro Station, as construction of the Silver Spring Transit Center was about to begin two days later. On September 28, 2008, both the original Silver Spring Metro Station Bus Bay where all WMATA Metrobus, Montgomery County Ride-On, and Shuttle UM Bus Routes originally stopped at, as well as the original Silver Spring Metro Station Kiss & Ride Lot were demolished, in order to make room for the construction of the Silver Spring Transit Center. As a result, all bus route terminals were temporarily rerouted to the side streets near the Silver Spring Metro Station until the Silver Spring Transit Center opened. The facility has 34 bays for Metro, Ride-on Buses, Shuttle-UM, "Kiss and Ride" access, Metrorail, and MARC train service. Its increased capacity is expected to ease the implementation of the Purple Line. The Transit Center will also mark the location for the future northern terminus of the Metropolitan Branch Trail, which heads southbound to Washington Union Station. The transit center is named for former U.S. Senator Paul Sarbanes.

The complex was subject to construction problems and the schedule was extensively delayed.

On March 19, 2013, an engineering firm engaged by Montgomery County to investigate the defects issued a report that indicated "significant and serious design and construction defects, including excessive cracking, missing post-tensioning cables, inadequate reinforcing steel, and concrete of insufficient strength and thickness."

In May 2014, repairs were announced to begin for the summer with the hope of completing them in time to open by early 2015, but after two months they had not resumed.

The facility was transferred from Montgomery County to the Washington Metropolitan Area Transit Authority (WMATA) in August 2015 after the completion of renovations, and opened on September 20, 2015, five years behind schedule.

On June 1, 2024, all Red Line stations north of Fort Totten, including Silver Spring, were closed to allow the Maryland Transit Authority to work on the upcoming Purple Line. Takoma re-opened on June 28, with the rest of the stations re-opening on September 1st.

== Station layout ==
Like Brookland–CUA, the Red Line island platform at Silver Spring is slightly curved, with convex mirrors located on the inbound side of the platform to aid train operators in making sure the area is clear before closing the doors. There is a pocket track just beyond the WMATA station, which used to be for turning back trains towards Grosvenor–Strathmore in select rush hour trips. The MARC station straddles the Metro station, with a single track and side platform on either side of the Red Line. The MARC platforms are slightly offset from the Metro platform and are connected by a pedestrian bridge. Access between the Red Line and other services is provided via an elevator or escalators from the platform to two ground-level mezzanines, one at the north end of the platform connecting to Colesville Road and one at the center of the platform serving the Transit Center and Metropolitan Branch Trail. Silver Spring station is accessible, with a single elevator between the Metro platform and the lobby. Installation of redundant elevators is planned as part of the construction of the Purple Line. The Purple Line will have two side platforms.

=== Penguin Rush Hour ===
The Silver Spring station is also home to Penguin Rush Hour, a 100-by-8-foot (30.5 by 2.4 m) mural painted by Sally Callmer Thompson, depicting penguins as Metro customers during rush hour. Although originally intended to be a temporary exhibit, the mural placed at the station in the early 1990s has become a symbol of the downtown area of Silver Spring. In 2004, the Silver Spring Regional Center, a county government facility, commissioned the original artist to restore the mural, which was damaged by the elements and missing sections, for approximately $30,000. In 2004-2005, the mural was removed for restoration, with the promise that it would be returned by the end of 2005. Subsequently, the county decided to postpone re-installation of the mural until completion of the new transit center. In March 2017 a digital copy of the mural, printed on aluminum sheets for durability, was installed at the transit center.
