= 7th Street–Georgia Avenue Limited =

D4X
- 7th Street–Georgia Avenue Limited

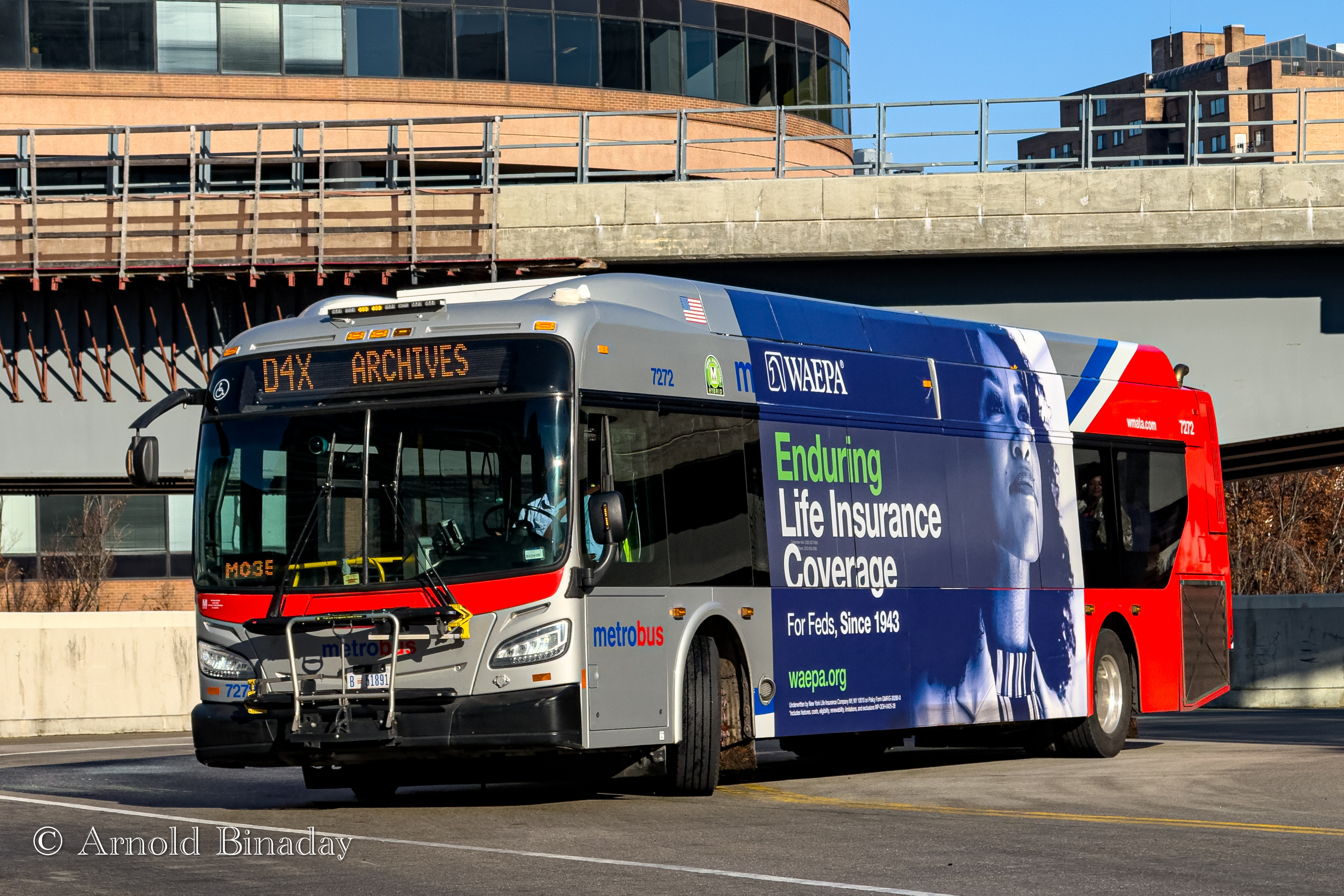
- Route D4X at Silver Spring station

Overview
- System: Metrobus
- Operator: Washington Metropolitan Area Transit Authority
- Garage: Montgomery
- Livery: MetroExtra
- Status: In Service
- Began service: March 19, 2007
- Predecessors: 79

Route
- Locale: Northwest, Montgomery County
- Communities served: Silver Spring, Shepherd Park, Brightwood, Petworth, Park View, Shaw, Mount Vernon Square, Chinatown, Archives, Downtown
- Landmarks served: Silver Spring station, Shepherd Park, Butternut/Aspen Streets, Piney Branch, Brightwood, Kennedy Street, Decatur Street, Upshur Street/Kansas Avenue, Georgia Avenue–Petworth station, Columbia/Irving, Howard University, Howard University Hospital, Florida Avenue, Shaw–Howard University station, Mount Vernon Square station, Walter E. Washington Convention Center, H Street, Gallery Place station, Capital One Arena, Archives station
- Start: Silver Spring station
- Via: Georgia Avenue NW, 7th Street NW
- End: Archives station
- Other routes: D40 7th Street-Georgia Avenue Local

Service
- Level: Daily
- Frequency: 10-15 minutes
- Operates: Weekdays: 6:00 AM – 10:00 PM; Weekends: 6:00 AM - 9:00 PM
- Ridership: 2,631,491 (FY 2025)
- Transfers: SmarTrip only
- Timetable: Georgia Avenue Limited Line

The 7th Street–Georgia Avenue Limited, designated as Route D4X, is a daily limited stop bus route that is operated by the Washington Metropolitan Area Transit Authority between Silver Spring station of the Red Line of the Washington Metro and Archives station of the Green and Yellow lines of the Washington Metro. The line operates every 10–12 minutes at all times. Trips are roughly 50 minutes long. This line provides additional limited-stop service for route D40 daily between 6:00 AM and 10:00 PM during weekdays and 6:00 AM and 9:00 PM during the weekends, serving select stops along Georgia Avenue and 7th Street.

== Route ==
Route D4X operates between Silver Spring station and Archives station providing limited stop service along Georgia Avenue. While it was still route 79, it and the S9 (now D6X) were the only MetroExtra routes to have full-time service with all other MetroExtra routes operating only during weekday or weekday peak periods prior to the MetroExtra branding being discontinued due to the 2025 Better Bus Network Redesign. It was also one of the few Metrobus routes with dedicated bus lanes. Route D4X operates out of Montgomery division.

=== Route D4X Stops ===
Bus stop	Direction	Connections
Montgomery County, Maryland
Silver Spring Bus Bay 221	Southbound station, Northbound terminal	Metrobus: C87, D40, D60, D6X, M20, M52, M54, M70, P30; Ride On: 1, 2, 4, 5, 8, 9, 11, 12, 13, 14, 15, 16, 17, 18, 19, 20, 21, 22, 28, Flash BRT (Blue, Orange); MTA Maryland Bus: 915, 929; Shuttle-UM: 111; Peter Pan Bus; Washington Metro: MARC: Brunswick Line; MTA: Purple Line (Planned)
Georgia Avenue / Blair Road	Northbound	Metrobus: D40, D60
Washington, D.C.
Georgia Avenue NW / Eastern Avenue NW	Southbound	Metrobus: D40, D60
Georgia Avenue NW / Aspen Street NW	Northbound	Metrobus: D40, D50, D5X
Georgia Avenue NW / Butternut Street NW	Southbound	Metrobus: D40, D50, D5X
Georgia Avenue NW / Tuckerman Street NW	Northbound	Metrobus: D40
Georgia Avenue NW / Piney Branch Road NW	Southbound	Metrobus: D40
Georgia Avenue NW / Missouri Avenue NW	Northbound	Metrobus: D40
Georgia Avenue NW / Rock Creek Ford Road NW	Southbound	Metrobus: D40
Georgia Avenue NW / Kennedy Street NW	Bidirectional	Metrobus: C81, D40
Georgia Avenue NW / Decatur Street NW	Bidirectional	Metrobus: D40
Georgia Avenue NW / Kansas Avenue NW	Southbound	Metrobus: C75, D40, D74
Georgia Avenue NW / Upshur Street NW	Northbound	Metrobus: C75, D40, D74
Georgia Avenue NW / New Hampshire Avenue NW Georgia Avenue-Petworth	Northbound	Metrobus: C63, C75, D40, D44, D74; Washington Metro:
Georgia Avenue-Petworth Bus Bay B	Southbound	Metrobus: C63, C75, D40, D44, D74; Washington Metro:
Georgia Avenue NW / Irving Street NW	Northbound	Metrobus: C61, C63, D40
Georgia Avenue NW / Columbia Road NW	Southbound	Metrobus: C61, C63, D40
Georgia Avenue NW / Howard Place NW Howard University	Bidirectional	Metrobus: D40
Georgia Avenue NW / Florida Avenue NW	Northbound	Metrobus: C51, C53, C57, D40
7th Street NW / T Street NW	Southbound	Metrobus: C51, C53, C57, D40
7th Street NW / Rhode Island Avenue NW Shaw-Howard U	Northbound	Metrobus: D32, D40; Washington Metro:
7th Street NW / R Street NW Shaw-Howard U	Southbound	Metrobus: D32, D40; Washington Metro:
7th Street NW / L Street NW Mount Vernon Square/7th Street-Convention Center	Northbound	Metrobus: D40; Washington Metro:
7th Street NW / M Street NW Mount Vernon Square/7th Street-Convention Center	Southbound	Metrobus: D40; Washington Metro:
7th Street NW / H Street NW Gallery Place-Chinatown	Bidirectional	Metrobus: D20, D2X, D24, D30, D34, D36, D40, D80, D94; Washington Metro:
7th Street NW / Pennsylvania Avenue NW Archives-Navy Memorial-Penn Quarter	Bidirectional	Metrobus: D10, D1X, D40; MTA Maryland Bus: 610, 640, 650, 705, 810, 820, 830, 840; PRTC OmniRide; MTA Maryland Commuter Bus; OmniRide Commuter; Washington Metro:
9th Street NW / Constitution Avenue NW Archives	Northbound station, Southbound terminal	Metrobus: D10, D1X, D30, D40, D60; MTA Maryland Bus: 610, 640, 650, 705, 810, 820, 830, 840; PRTC OmniRide; MTA Maryland Commuter Bus; OmniRide Commuter

== History ==
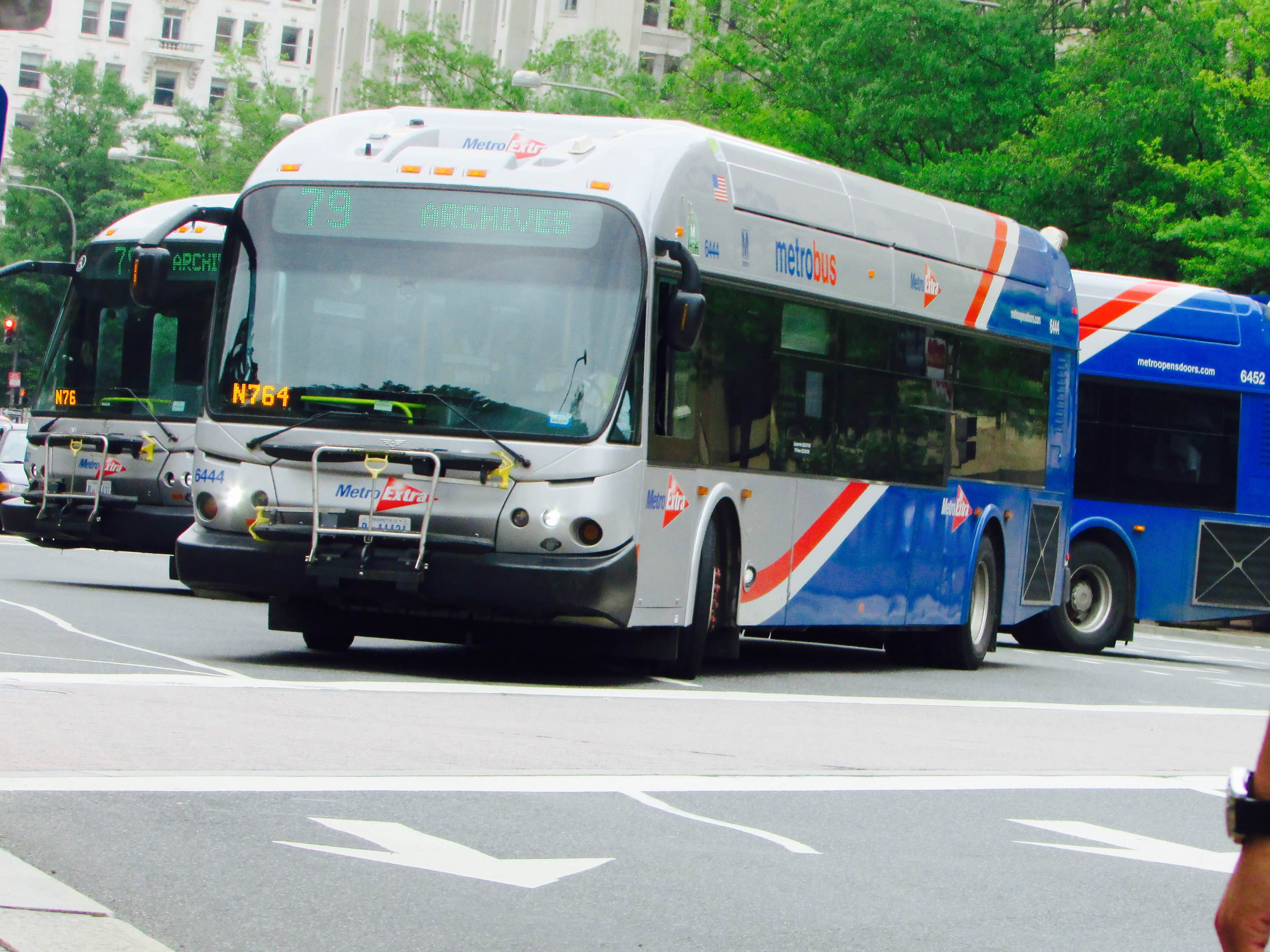
Former Route 79 in 2015

Before WMATA implemented the Better Bus Redesign network, Route D4X was previously known as Route 79. Prior to route 79, the only express route that operated along Georgia Avenue was the Brightwood Express Line under route 73. Route 73 was the main express route operating along Georgia Avenue running between the intersection of Eastern Avenue & King Street and L'Enfant Plaza station via Georgia Avenue NW, Sherman Avenue, 9th Street NW, and 7th Street NW. However, in 2000, route 73 was discontinued and replaced by routes 70 and 71.

=== New Route 79 ===
In response to growing demand along Georgia Avenue, plus to reduce overcrowding on routes 70 and 71, WMATA launched Route 79 under their new MetroExtra brand on March 19, 2007 as a limited stop express service providing service on high ridership lines. Route 79 was the first MetroExtra route introduced by WMATA which would operate between Silver Spring station and Archives station during weekday peak-hours only. The new route will only serve 16 stops northbound and 15 stops southbound.

The original run of route 79 used the 2007 New Flyer C40LFRs out of Bladensburg division. Although, route 79 started using other buses throughout the years, when the C40LFRs undergoes maintenance.

=== Changes ===
On September 25, 2011, new midday service was added to route 79 which operates every 10–12 minutes.

On March 24, 2013, new Saturday service was added to route 79. The line would operate every 15 minutes between 6:00 a.m. and 7:00 p.m. only.

On December 29, 2013, new Sunday service was added to route 79 also operating between 6:00 a.m. and 7:00 p.m. operating every 15 minutes.

During WMATA's FY2021 budget year proposal, WMATA proposed to raise the MetroExtra fare from $2.00 to $3.00 at all times. However, WMATA also proposed to operate route 79 up to 10:00 p.m. instead of 7:00 p.m. daily.

During the COVID-19 pandemic, the line was reduced to operate on its Saturday supplemental schedule during the weekdays beginning on March 16, 2020. On March 18, 2020, the line was further reduced to operate on its Sunday schedule. On March 21, 2020, weekend service was also suspended and replaced by the 70.

On August 23, 2020, southbound route 79 service was rerouted to operate along 7th street instead of 9th street in order to streamline service. Weekend service was also restored.

On June 10, 2021, WMATA proposed to increase the 79 to operate every 12 minutes daily between 7:00 AM to 9:00 PM daily as part of WMATA's Pandemic Recovery Plan.

On September 5, 2021, the 79 was increased to operate every 12 minutes daily between 7AM and 9PM daily.

=== Cash Free pilot ===
On June 24, 2018, route 79 began a six-month cash free pilot for WMATA. According to WMATA, route 79 was selected for the pilot due to its proximity to retail stores and Metrorail stations to purchase or load SmarTrip cards, as well as alternative bus service for cash-paying riders. Passengers wishing to pay with cash would have to ride the local route 70 instead.

==== Controversy ====
The pilot had passengers worried overall. Non SmarTrip riders will lose access to one of the most heavily used bus lines in the system.

It is something that’s a trend within the industry, but we want to see how that plays out here in our community.

— WMATA General Manager Paul Wiedefeld

DC Councilmember David Grosso sent a letter to WMATA General Manager Paul Wiedefeld, urging him to consider the implications of cashless bus service stating:

As this policy seeks to push cash users to utilize a SmarTrip, it will lengthen their commutes because it will be difficult and potentially expensive to find and use a SmartTrip machine unless they happen to live, work, or go to school near a Metrorail station or WMATA retail partner. This is particularly concerning for residents in Wards 7 and 8, where only 3 non-Metrorail station sales locations exist.

Metro also asked the public's feedback on cashless payment and can be expanded onto other MetroExtra routes and future limited stop routes. However, riders are not in favor of the cashless experiment. Metro Accessibility Advisory Committee Chair Phil Posner told the Metro Board in an WTOP interview:

Cash-free buses are something we have always worried about for the disability community and the underserved community, because there is a group that doesn’t have access to anything but cash — do not have credit cards, do not have bank accounts, do not have checking accounts. The 79 express makes 16 stops... the alternate route, the 70, makes 49 stops. Make a decision that has a little heart to it for the people, the large population, that doesn’t have it, because this is a pilot that’s going to affect everything from Columbia Pike throughout the entire system, and I think that’s really important to take into account.

Maryland Metro Board Member Michael Goldman also said:

Let’s see what the experiment shows, but we obviously have problems not just on bus but on rail with individuals entering the system and not paying. So let’s see what happens on the bus side and see if, on balance, this produces more benefits in terms of shorter stops at bus stops and a shorter ride for our passengers than... whatever revenue might be lost by allowing a few riders to travel for free.

The Metro Board took in all surveys by November 2018 and will consider if they should extend the cashless payment.

In December 2018, WMATA announced that the cashless payment pilot will be extended for another six months on route 79 with a full permanent adoption being decided in 2019. In May 2019, WMATA announced that the cashless payment pilot will end on June 23, 2019. Regular fares will still be applied to the route.

=== Better Bus Redesign ===
In 2022, WMATA launched its Better Bus Redesign project, which aimed to redesign the entire Metrobus Network and is the first full redesign of the agency's bus network in its history.

In April 2023, WMATA launched its Draft Visionary Network. As part of the drafts, WMATA proposed to extend the 70 and 79 to Waterfront station via 7th Street NW, Maine Avenue SW, and M Street SW, keeping the same routing between Silver Spring station and Archives station. The route was named Route DC107 in the drafts.

During WMATA's Revised Draft Visionary Network, WMATA renamed the DC107 to Route D42 and was cutback to Archives station with late night service being extended to L'Enfant Plaza station, taking the current routing of Route 70. Service to Buzzard Point and Waterfront would be served by the proposed Route D14. A new Route D4X was also introduced to do limited stops along Georgia Avenue NW and 7th Street NW, following the same routing as Route 79. All changes were then proposed during WMATA's 2025 Proposed Network.

On November 21, 2024, WMATA approved its Better Bus Redesign Network.

Beginning on June 29, 2025, Route 79 was renamed into the D4X, keeping the same routing.
