= Georgia Avenue–Petworth station =

Washington Metro station

Georgia Avenue–Petworth
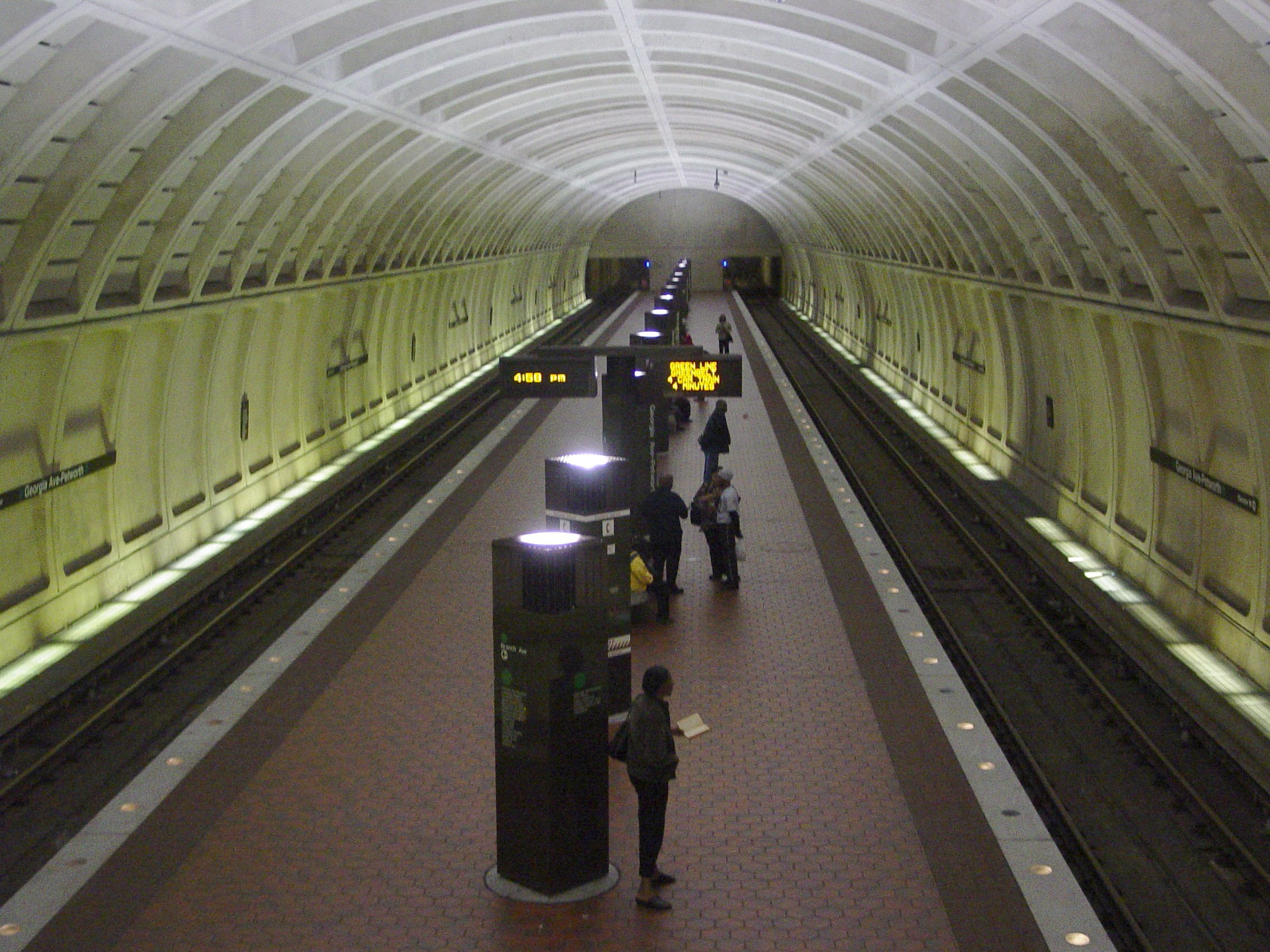
- Station platform in May 2004

General information
- Location: 3700 Georgia Avenue NW; Washington, D.C.
- Coordinates: 38.936112°N 77.024395°W
- Owner: WMATA
- Platforms: 1 island platform
- Tracks: 2
- Connections: Metrobus: C63, C75, D40, D44, D4X, D74

Construction
- Structure type: Underground
- Cycle facilities: Capital Bikeshare, 12 lockers
- Accessible: Yes

Other information
- Station code: E05

History
- Opened: September 18, 1999

Passengers
- 2025: 4,986 (average weekday)
- Rank: 31 of 98

Services
Preceding station	Washington Metro	Following station
Columbia Heights toward Huntington	Yellow Line	Fort Totten toward Greenbelt
Columbia Heights toward Branch Avenue	Green Line	Fort Totten toward Greenbelt
Route map
Location

Georgia Avenue–Petworth station is a Washington Metro station in Washington, D.C., on the Green and Yellow Lines. It is located at the border of the neighborhoods of Petworth, Sixteenth Street Heights, and Park View in Northwest.

== Station layout ==
The station has an island platform located below New Hampshire Avenue, with street-level access from the intersection with Georgia Avenue. It also features the "Arch II" design found at Columbia Heights, Congress Heights, Glenmont, and Mount Vernon Square.

== History ==
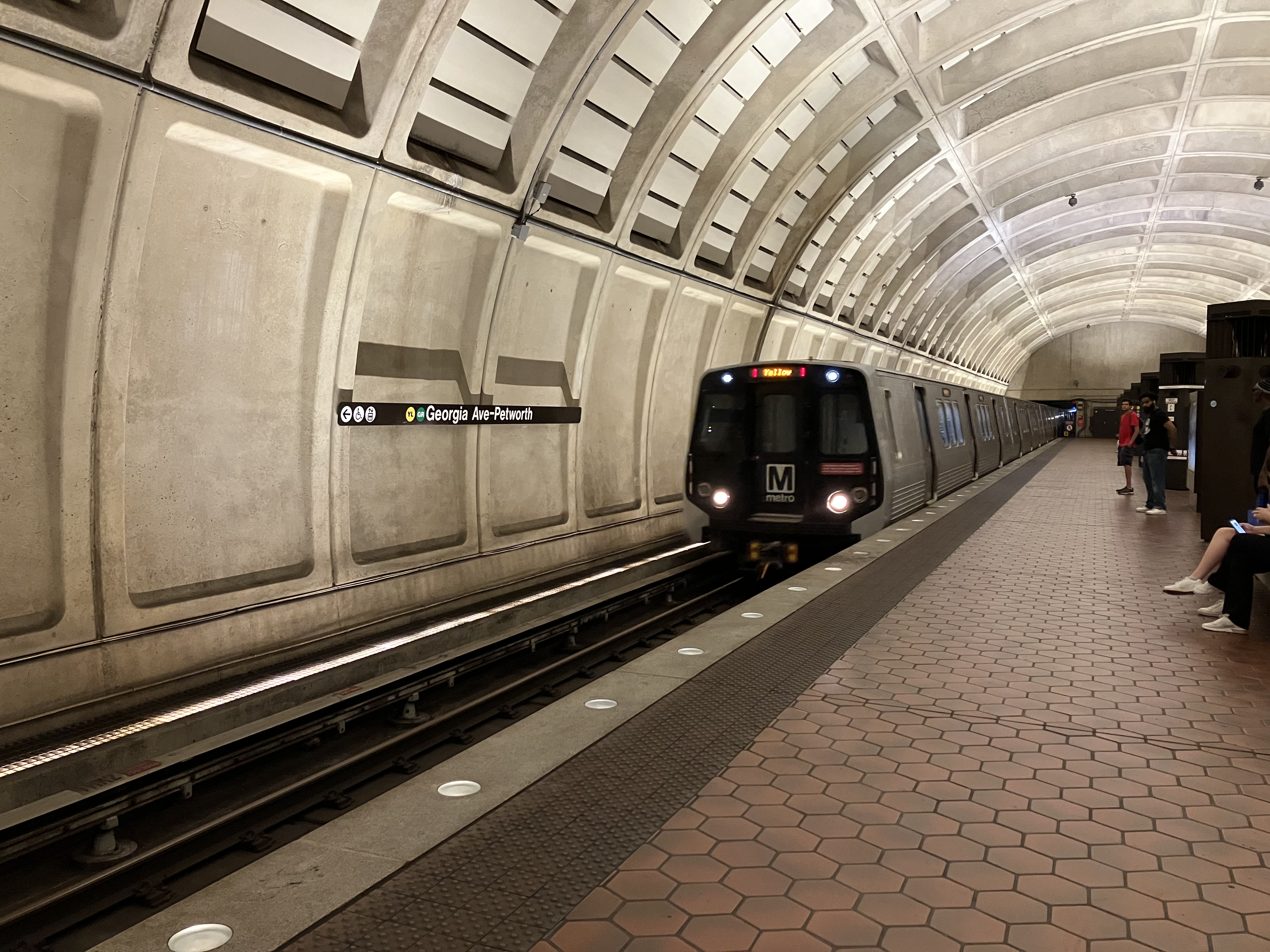
A Huntington-bound Yellow Line train at the station in September 2022

It opened on September 18, 1999, part of an extension of the Green Line that connected U Street and Fort Totten, allowing trains to travel between Anacostia and Greenbelt.

The station's west entrance closed on December 11, 2006, to accommodate construction of a mixed-use development. Bus stops, bike racks, and lockers were moved, and the entrance remained closed until 2009, a year later than planned.

Like many other Metro stations, Georgia Avenue–Petworth has catalyzed nearby development. The District of Columbia Office of Planning has divided development proposals near the station into four localities:

- Park View. Composed of three blocks along Georgia Avenue south of the station—3200 West, 3400 East, and 3500 East—Park View development is mainly limited by a 50-foot (15 m) height limit to infill residential or four- to six-story mixed-use development.
- Pleasant Plains. Further south, sites at 2700 West and 2900 West on Georgia Avenue are also subject to the low height restriction but with more emphasis on apartments and row houses.
- Petworth-Metro. To the north, this is the largest neighborhood by sites available and height, with a restriction of 65 ft (20 m). It contains a series of blocks on Georgia Avenue from Princeton Place to Shepherd Street, with the 3700 West block already developed as Park Place, containing 148 condos and 17,000 sq ft (1,579 m^{2}) of street-level retail space.
- Upshur. The northernmost of the four regions, it is centered on Upshur Street near Kansas Avenue. As with Pleasant Plains, the Planning Office has focused on residential development for Upshur.

On May 7, 2023, the northeastern terminus of the Yellow Line was truncated from Greenbelt to Mount Vernon Square, following its reopening after a nearly eight-month-long major rehabilitation project on its bridge over the Potomac River and its tunnel leading into L'Enfant Plaza. Half of Yellow Line service was re-extended to Greenbelt on December 31, 2025.
