= Gallery Place station =

Metro rail station in Washington, D.C.

Gallery Place Chinatown
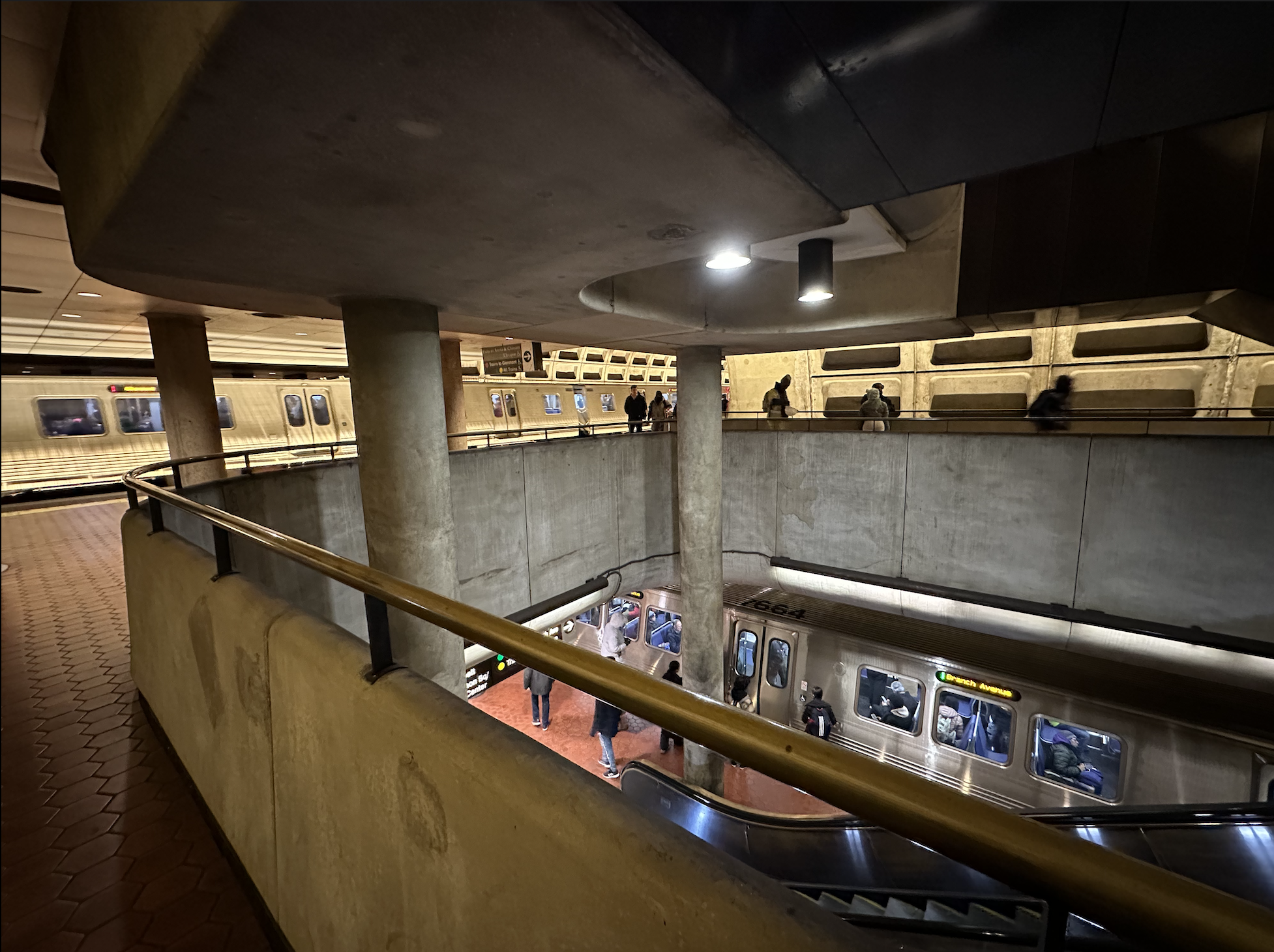
- A Glenmont-bound Red Line train on the upper level of Gallery Place departing while a Branch Avenue-bound Green Line serves the lower level of the station in February 2023.

General information
- Location: 630 H Street NW; Washington, D.C.
- Coordinates: 38°53′56″N 77°01′18″W
- Platforms: 2 side platforms (upper level); 1 island platform (lower level)
- Tracks: 4 (2 per level)
- Connections: Metrobus: D20, D24, D2X, D30, D34, D36, D40, D4X, D80, D94

Construction
- Structure type: Underground
- Depth: 28 ft (8.5 m) (upper level); 41 ft (12 m) (lower level)
- Platform levels: 2
- Cycle facilities: Capital Bikeshare
- Accessible: Yes

Other information
- Station code: B01 (upper level); F01 (lower level)

History
- Opened: December 15, 1976
- Former names: Gallery Place (1976–1986; 2011-present); Gallery Place–Chinatown (1986–2011)

Passengers
- 2025: 15,044 (average weekday)
- Rank: 4 of 98

Services
| Preceding station | Washington Metro | Following station |
|---|---|---|
| Metro Center toward Shady Grove | Red Line | Judiciary Square toward Glenmont |
| Archives toward Huntington | Yellow Line | Mount Vernon Square toward Mount Vernon Square or Greenbelt |
| Archives toward Branch Avenue | Green Line | Mount Vernon Square toward Greenbelt |
Former services
| Preceding station | Washington Metro | Following station |
|---|---|---|
| Metro Center toward Farragut North | Green Line Commuter Shortcut | Judiciary Square toward Greenbelt |
Route map
Location

Gallery Place station is a Washington Metro station in Washington, D.C., United States, on the Green, Yellow and Red Lines. It is one of the 4 major transfer points, a transfer station between the Red Line on the upper level and the Green/Yellow Lines on the lower level.

Gallery Place is located in Northwest Washington, with entrances at 7th and F, 7th and H, and 9th and G Streets. The station's only street elevator is north of F Street on the east side of 7th Street. The station, which is beneath Capital One Arena, serves that arena and the surrounding Chinatown and Penn Quarter neighborhoods in downtown Washington.

== Station layout ==
Like other downtown transfer stations, Gallery Place has a two-level configuration. However, unlike Metro Center and L'Enfant Plaza, where the platforms cross centrally, the Green and Yellow Line platforms are located near the east end of the station, resulting in an off-balance layout. This is a result of the Green and Yellow Lines' location below 7th Street NW, while the Red Line curves southeast heading towards Judiciary Square and Union Station.

Plans to add a pedestrian tunnel connecting Gallery Place with Metro Center have long been in the works. The "Gallery Place/Chinatown - Metro Center Pedestrian Passageway Tunnel Study" was completed in July 2005.

== History ==
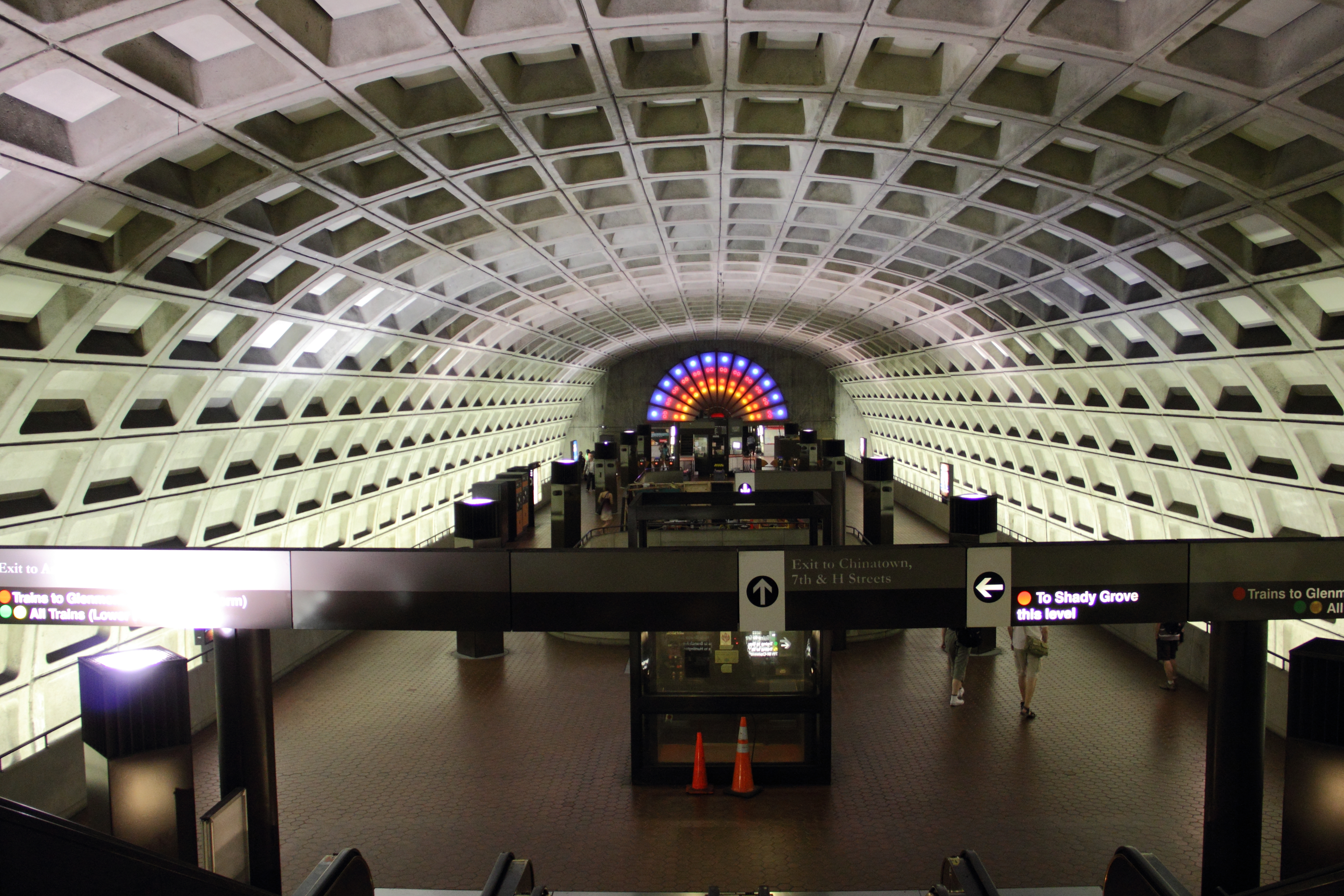
The north mezzanine with The Glory of the Chinese Descendants

Service began on December 15, 1976, as part of the original Red Line that ran from Farragut North to Rhode Island Avenue–Brentwood. The opening of the station was delayed by a court order over lack of accessibility for all (it was originally supposed to open with the rest of the first stations on March 27, 1976). WMATA provided assurance that such access would be available by June 1, 1977.

Yellow Line service began on April 30, 1983, extending service to the Pentagon and National Airport stations. An abstract wall sculpture, The Yellow Line by Constance Fleures, was installed in 1989 on the lower-level platform, Green Line service began in 1991, adding service (at the time) to U Street and Anacostia.

Originally named Gallery Place after the nearby National Portrait Gallery and Smithsonian American Art Museum, the station was renamed Gallery Place–Chinatown in 1986 (although the station's signage was not replaced until 1990). By 1997, elevators at the east mezzanine were added as part of the construction of the Verizon Center. In 2000, a sculpture entitled The Glory of the Chinese Descendants by Foon Sham, was installed over the 7th and H Street entrance at the mezzanine level. The sculpture depicts a large Chinese-style fan above a bowl of rice. The station reverted to its original name, Gallery Place, on November 3, 2011, with "Chinatown" listed as a subtitle.

This station has been a testing ground for new features in Metro stations. In 1993, the station was one of the first Metro stations to receive tactile edging on its platforms. Since 2004, the station has been the site of testing for new signage. As a result, there is far more signage in this station than most others, including lighted signs, as well as signage that isn't found anywhere else in the system. In 2007, red LEDs were tested for the platform edge lights on the upper level. Orange LEDs were tested at the platform edge on the lower level, before being replaced by red LEDs in 2008. In 2017, WMATA added yellow stickers on the platform floors to remind riders where the end of six-car trains stop, to help riders avoid being in the area near the end of the platform behind where the last car of the train stops.

The station was closed from January 15–21, 2021, because of security concerns due to the 2021 Inauguration.
