= Mount Vernon Square station =

Washington Metro station

Mount Vernon Square 7th Street–Convention Center
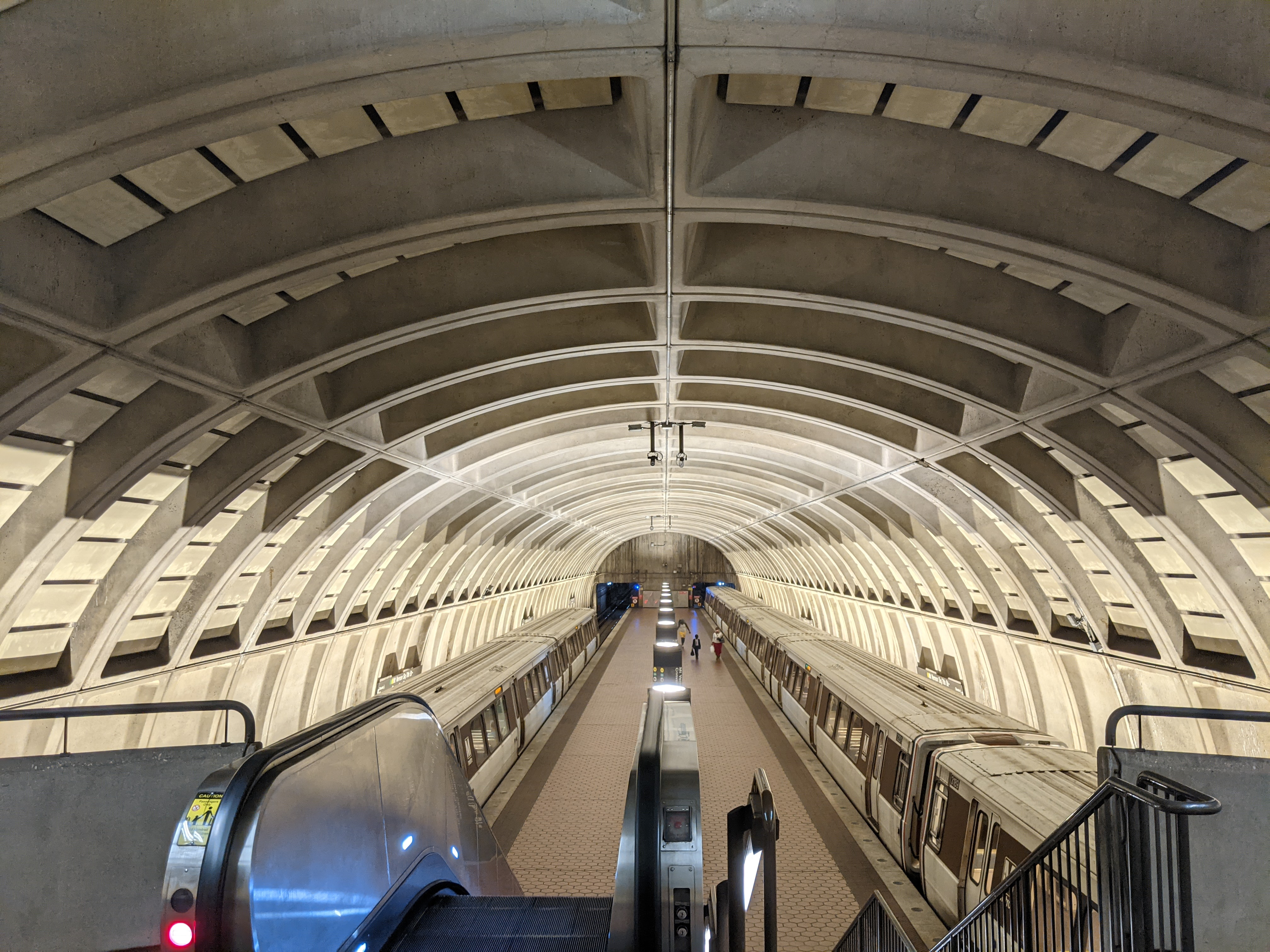
- Station platform from the mezzanine in August 2022

General information
- Location: 700 M Street NW; Washington, D.C.
- Coordinates: 38.905645°N 77.021928°W
- Owner: Washington Metropolitan Area Transit Authority
- Platforms: 1 island platform
- Tracks: 2
- Connections: Metrobus: D40, D4X; Loudoun County Commuter Bus

Construction
- Structure type: Underground
- Cycle facilities: Capital Bikeshare, 6 racks
- Accessible: Yes

Other information
- Station code: E01

History
- Opened: May 11, 1991
- Rebuilt: 2003
- Former names: Mt Vernon Square-UDC (1991–2001); Mt Vernon Sq/7th St-Convention Center (2001–2011)

Passengers
- 2025: 4,288 (average weekday)
- Rank: 42 of 98

Services
| Preceding station | Washington Metro | Following station |
|---|---|---|
| Gallery Place toward Huntington | Yellow Line | Terminus |
| Gallery Place toward Huntington | Yellow Line | Shaw–Howard University toward Greenbelt |
| Gallery Place toward Branch Avenue | Green Line | Shaw-Howard University toward Greenbelt |
Route map
Location

Mount Vernon Square station is a Washington Metro station in Washington, D.C., served by the Green Line and Yellow Line. It is the northern terminus for half of Yellow Line service.

== Location and design ==
Mount Vernon Square station is located at the border of the neighborhoods of Downtown and Shaw in the northwestern quadrant of Washington. Its namesake, Mount Vernon Square, is located two blocks to the south at the convergence of New York Avenue and Massachusetts Avenues and 7th, 9th, and K Streets. The station's subtitle is derived from the station's location along 7th Street NW and its proximity to the Walter E. Washington Convention Center. However, the station is only one of five Metro stations underneath 7th Street NW.

The station) has a single island platform accessed from the southwest corner of Seventh and M Streets, NW. There is a pocket track just beyond the station going north, which is currently used to turn Yellow Line trains for service back to Huntington. The station uses the "Arch II" design found at Columbia Heights, Congress Heights, Georgia Avenue-Petworth, and Glenmont.

== Transit-oriented development ==
Like many other Metro stations in the Washington Metropolitan Area, Mount Vernon Square station has spurred development in its proximity. Most prominent is the Washington Convention Center, although a number of smaller residential and commercial projects have been completed within the surrounding blocks. To the southeast of the station is the Mount Vernon Triangle, a business improvement district (BID) seeing rapid mixed-use growth. To the southwest of the station is the mixed-use CityCenterDC development project, which is home to luxury condominiums and luxury retail franchises such as Louis Vuitton, Moncler, Gucci, Hugo Boss, Tesla, Del Frisco's Double Eagle Steak House, Fig & Olive and other upscale dining and shopping destinations.

== History ==
Service began on May 11, 1991. The station mezzanine was renovated in 2003 to coincide with the opening of the Walter E. Washington Convention Center. The renovation included additional faregates and a new street entrance. In 2003, two redundant elevators near the entrance with escalators were opened. The station was the first station in the system to get redundant elevators.

On January 7, 2007, the fifth car of a six-car train derailed in the tunnel at the interlocking south of the station, sending twenty people to the hospital for minor injuries and significantly damaging a rail car. Service resumed the next day at 5 AM.

Beginning on May 25, 2019, Yellow Line trains no longer terminated at this station during rush hours and extended to Greenbelt at all times.

From March 26, 2020 until June 28, 2020, this station was closed due to the 2020 coronavirus pandemic.

From October 12 to 14, 2021, Blue Line trains temporarily served the station due to a derailment near the Arlington Cemetery station. Since May 7, 2023, the northeastern terminus of the Yellow Line was truncated from Greenbelt to this station, following its reopening after a nearly eight-month-long major rehabilitation project on its bridge over the Potomac River and its tunnel leading into L'Enfant Plaza. Some Yellow Line service was re-extended to Greenbelt in December 2025.

=== Name changes ===
Originally to be named "Federal City College", the station was named Mount Vernon Square–UDC at the time of its 1991 opening, reflecting the establishment of the University of the District of Columbia. The station was renamed Mt Vernon Sq/7th Street–Convention Center in 2001; the "7th Street" helped distinguish that the stop served the new Walter E. Washington Convention Center as opposed to the old Washington Convention Center at 9th Street NW. On November 3, 2011, the station was again renamed, taking "Mount Vernon Square" as the main name, with "7th Street–Convention Center" as a subtitle.
