= 7th Street–Georgia Avenue Line =

Bus route in Washington, D.C., United States

D40
- 7th Street–Georgia Avenue Line

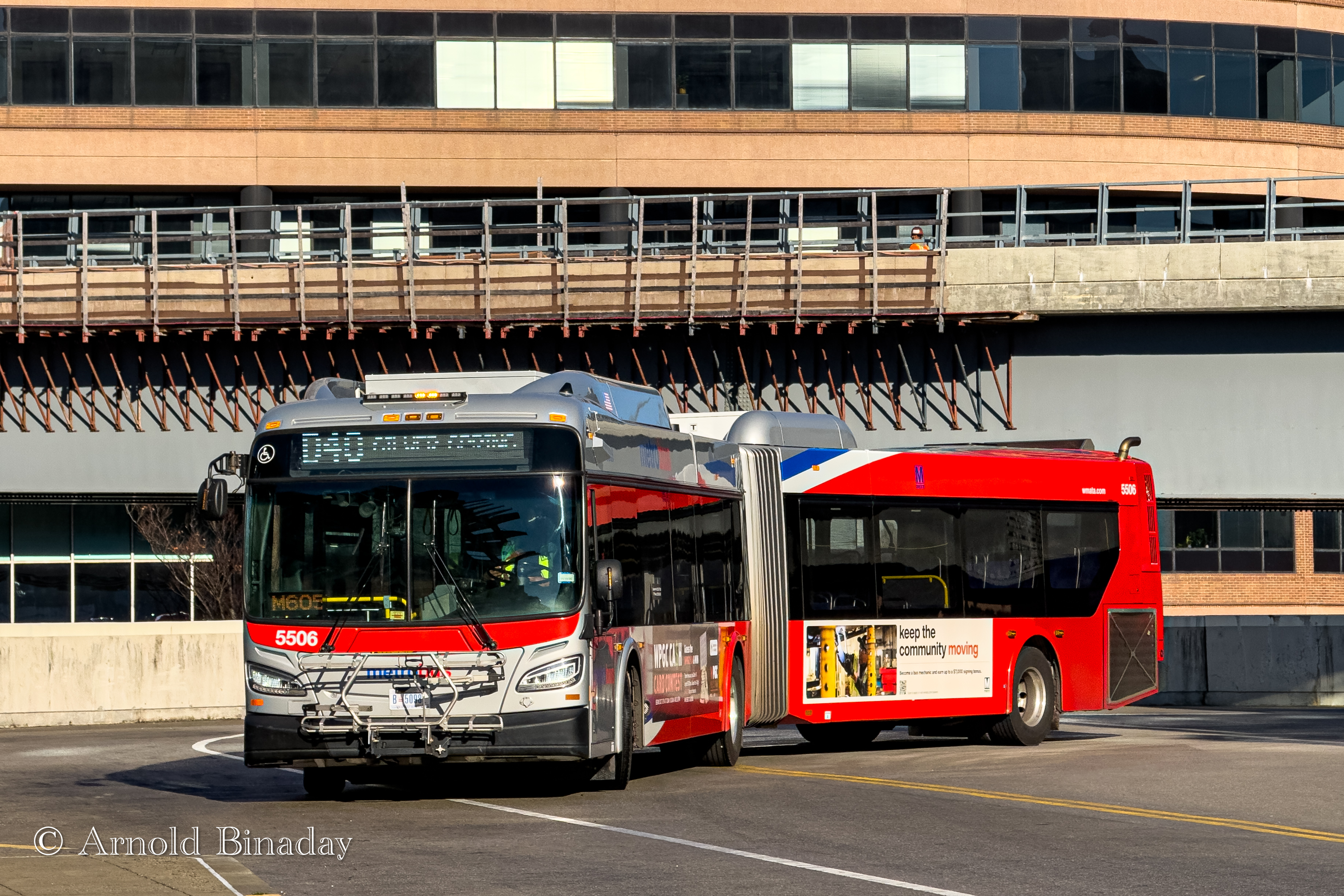
- Route D40 at Silver Spring station

Overview
- System: Metrobus
- Operator: Washington Metropolitan Area Transit Authority
- Garage: Montgomery
- Livery: Local
- Status: In Service
- Began service: 1863
- Predecessors: 70

Route
- Locale: Southwest, Northwest, Montgomery County
- Communities served: Silver Spring, Shepherd Park, Brightwood, Petworth, Park View, Shaw, Mount Vernon Square, Chinatown, Downtown
- Landmarks served: Silver Spring station, Georgia Avenue–Petworth station, Howard University, Howard University Hospital, Shaw–Howard University station, Mount Vernon Square station, Walter E. Washington Convention Center, Gallery Place station, Capital One Arena, Archives station, L'Enfant Plaza station (Late night and early morning only)
- Start: Silver Spring station
- Via: Georgia Avenue NW, 7th Street NW
- End: Archives station L'Enfant Plaza station (D & 7th Streets SW) (Late night and early morning only)
- Other routes: D4X 7th Street-Georgia Avenue Limited

Service
- Level: Daily
- Frequency: 12 minutes (Weekdays); 15 minutes (Weekends); 20 minutes (After 11:00 PM)
- Operates: 24 Hours
- Ridership: 4,293,943 (FY 2025)
- Transfers: SmarTrip only
- Timetable: Georgia Avenue–7th Street Line

The 7th Street–Georgia Avenue Line, designated as Route D40, is a daily bus route that is operated by the Washington Metropolitan Area Transit Authority between Silver Spring station of the Red Line of the Washington Metro and Archives station of the Green and Yellow lines of the Washington Metro, with late night and early morning trips extending to L'Enfant Plaza station of the Blue, Orange, Silver, Green and Yellow Lines of the Washington Metro. The line operates every 12 minutes during the weekdays, 15 minutes during the weekends, and 20 minutes during the late nights. Route D40 trips are roughly 60 minutes long.

== Current route ==
Route D40 operates between Silver Spring station and Archives station with late night and early morning trips extending to L'Enfant Plaza station providing service along the Georgia Avenue and 7th street corridor. The line was one of the most heavily used routes, ranking 2nd in ridership as of 2023, and combined with its limited-stop counterpart, the D4X, make up the busiest transit corridor in the system. It was also one of the few Metrobus routes with dedicated bus lanes. The line was one of the most recognized and popular bus routes.

Route D40 operates 24 hours a day out of Montgomery division. It is one of the few routes to use articulated buses on its route due to high passenger volume.

== History ==
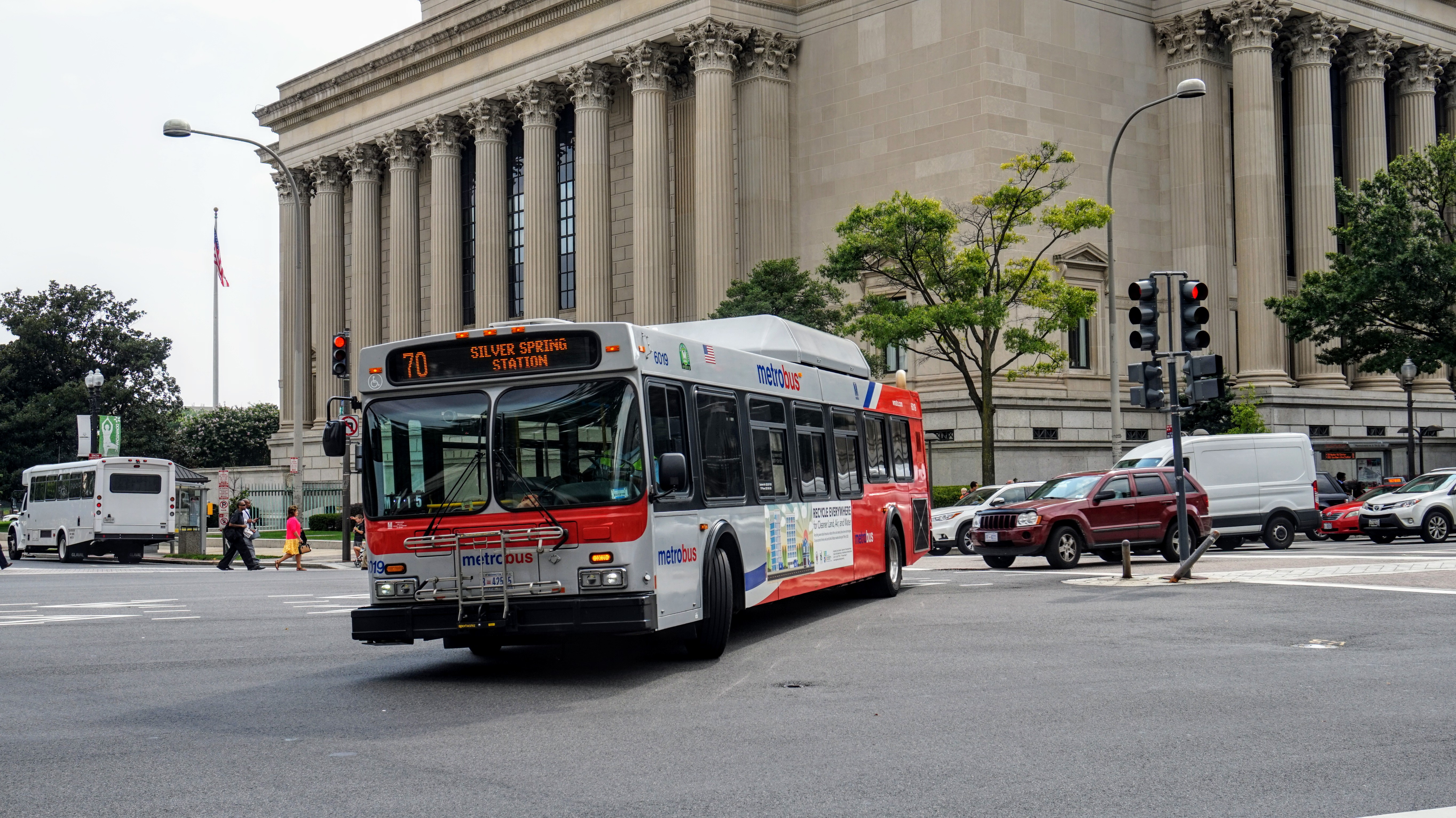
Route 70 at Archives station in 2017

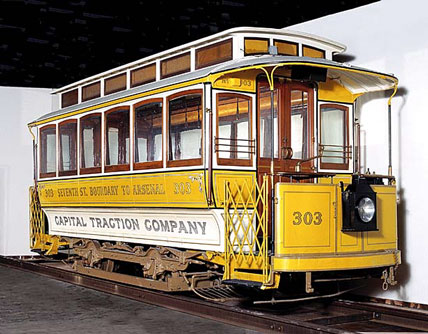
This 4-wheel, electric motor car was one of sixteen built for the Capital Traction Company by the American Car Company and was assigned to the 7th Street line.

Before WMATA implemented the Better Bus Redesign network, Route D40 was previously known as Route 70. Route 70 originally operated under both the Georgia Avenue Line and 7th Street Line. The Georgia Avenue portion was created in 1862 and originally operated by streetcars by the Washington Railway & Electric Company alongside routes 72 and 74. Route 70 operated between Archives and Silver Spring, route 72 operated between Takoma and Downtown DC along Georgia Avenue, and route 74 operated between Soldiers Home in Northwest and Fort McNair.

On October 18, 1888, the day after the Eckington and Soldiers' Home Railway began operation, Congress authorized the Brightwood Railway to electrify the Metropolitan's streetcar line on Seventh Street Extended NW or Brightwood Avenue NW (now known as Georgia Avenue NW) and to extend it to the District boundary at Silver Spring. In 1890 they bought the former Boundary and Silver Spring line from the Metropolitan, but continued to operate it as a horse line. In 1892 it was ordered by Congress to switch to overhead electrical power and complete the line. The next year, the streetcar tracks reached Takoma Park via a spur along Butternut Street NW to 4th Street NW. In 1898, the Brightwood was ordered to switch to underground electric power on pain of having its charter revoked.

Route 70 was later electrified in 1890, followed by route 72 in 1892, and route 74 in 1893.

The 7th Street section was operated by the Capital Traction Company when it was created in 1873. It originally operated between Archives and Half and O Street in Southwest DC. That line was electrified in 1898.

=== Later years ===
When the Capital Traction Company and the Washington Railway & Electric Company merged, forming the Capital Transit Company in 1933, the Georgia Avenue and 7th Street Lines were merged into one route operated under route 70 between Silver Spring and Half and O Streets. Routes 72 and 74 were not affected by the changes.

In 1956, DC Transit acquired the Capital Transit Company and routes 70, 72, and 74 were acquired by them. This also meant the end of streetcars beginning in 1958. Routes 70, 72 and 74 were converted into buses on January 3, 1960, when the Southern Division (Maine Avenue) Car Barn was closed.

Routes 70, 72, and 74 were later acquired by WMATA to run under Metrobus when DC Transit was acquired by WMATA on January 4, 1973.

Following the changes, route 72 was discontinued and replaced by routes 50, 52, and 54 while 74 was also discontinued and replaced by route 60. A new route 71 was later introduced to operate alongside the 70 during the weekday peak hours between Silver Spring and Buzzard Point via the 70's routing except operating along 2nd Street, V Street, 1st Street, and T street. A new route 73 was also introduced as the Brightwood-Petworth Line to operate alongside the 70 and 71.

=== Changes ===
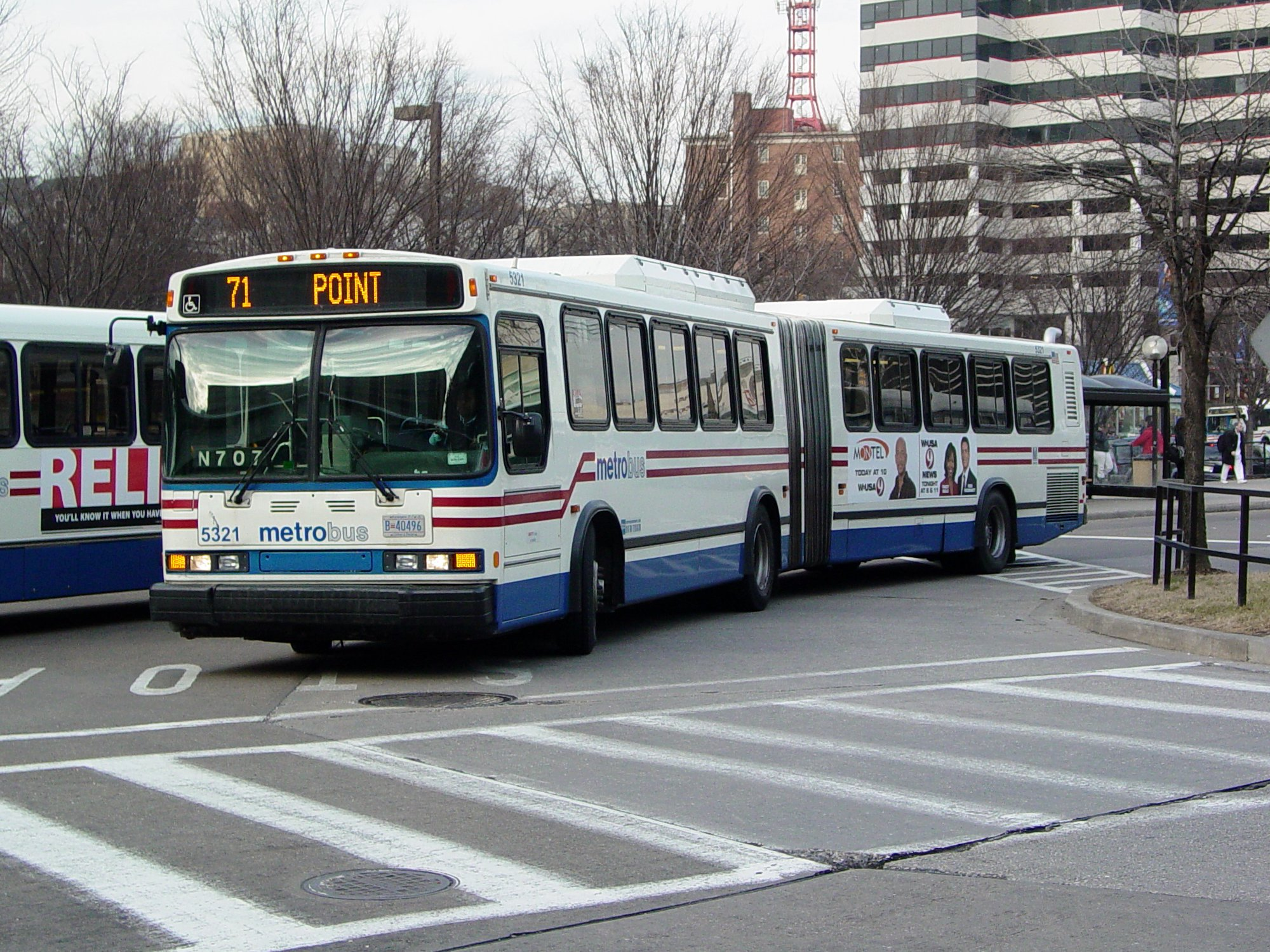
Route 71 at Silver Spring station.

In 1978, route 70 was rerouted to serve the newly opened Silver Spring station connecting riders to the Red Line.

On June 25, 2000, route 73 was eliminated and replaced by routes 70 and 71 as route 73 overlapped both routes.

In 2010, WMATA proposed to shorten routes 70 and 71 to Archives station in order to improve reliability and improve on time performance. All route 70 and 71 service past Archives station to Half and O streets and Buzzard Point would be eliminated. Route P6 would be rerouted from M Street SW via Delaware Avenue, Canal Street, P Street, and 4th Street back to M Street to replace Route 70 and via Delaware Avenue, Canal Street, 2nd Street, V Street, Half Street, S Street, 1st Street, P Street, and 4th Street back to M Street to replace route 71.

A year later, WMATA proposed to end route 70 at Archives station and eliminate all route 71 service. The length of these routes, and the congested traffic conditions under which they operate, are subject them to delays, bunching, and overall poor reliability according to WMATA. Service past Archives station to Half and O streets would be replaced by a new route 74 which will operate on weekdays between Chinatown and Buzzard Point during the weekday peak-hours and between Chinatown and Fort McNair during the off-peak hours. During the weekday evenings and all day weekends, route V8 would be extended to Gallery Place station via Fort McNair.

At the time of the proposals, route 70 operated daily between Silver Spring station and Half and O Street with late night trips ending at Archives station while route 71 only operated during the weekday peak hours while serving Buzzard Point.

On September 25, 2011, route 71 was discontinued and all route 70 trips were shortened to Archives station terminating along Constitution Avenue. Service past Constitution Avenue to Half and O Street/Buzzard Point was discontinued on route 70 with a new route 74 operating between Walter E. Washington Convention Center and Half and O Street while running the Buzzard Point loop during the weekday peak hours. The new 74 replaced the 70 and 71 to Half and O Street while also replacing the DC Circulator Convention Center-Southwest Waterfront route.

When the Paul S. Sarbanes Transit Center at Silver Spring station opened, route 70 was rerouted from its terminus along Wayne Avenue to the new transit center. Route 70 were assigned to Bus Bay 220 on level 2.

During the COVID-19 pandemic, the line was reduced to operate on its Saturday supplemental schedule during the weekdays beginning on March 16, 2020. On March 18, 2020, the line was further reduced to operate on its Sunday schedule. On March 21, 2020, weekend service was reduced to operate every 30 minutes. Service was restored to its full service on August 23, 2020.

In February 2021 during WMATA's FY2022 budget crisis, WMATA proposed to increase span to add late-night service to 2:00 AM between July and December 2021 in the first half of the fiscal year, but would reduce it back to midnight between January to June 2022 in the second half of the fiscal year. Subsequently on April 22, 2021, WMATA approved the FY2022 budget and received federal funding to avoid service cuts.

On June 6, 2021, late-night service was increased to operate up to 2:00 AM. On May 29, 2022, all late night route 70 service was extended to terminate at L'Enfant Plaza station. On December 17, 2023, new 24 hour service was added.

=== Better Bus Redesign ===
In 2022, WMATA launched its Better Bus Redesign project, which aimed to redesign the entire Metrobus Network and is the first full redesign of the agency's bus network in its history.

In April 2023, WMATA launched its Draft Visionary Network. As part of the drafts, WMATA proposed to extend the 70 and 79 to Waterfront station via 7th Street NW, Maine Avenue SW, and M Street SW, keeping the same routing between Silver Spring station and Archives station. The route was named Route DC107 in the drafts.

During WMATA's Revised Draft Visionary Network, WMATA renamed the DC107 to Route D42 and was cutback to Archives station with late night service being extended to L'Enfant Plaza station, taking the current routing of Route 70. Service to Buzzard Point and Waterfront would be served by the proposed Route D14. All changes were then proposed during WMATA's 2025 Proposed Network.

During the proposals, Route D42 was renamed to Route D40 and kept its same proposed routing.

On November 21, 2024, WMATA approved its Better Bus Redesign Network.

Beginning on June 29, 2025, Route 70 was renamed into the D40, keeping the same routing.
