= Columbia Heights (Oregon) =

Mountain in Oregon, United States

- Location within Oregon Location within the United States

Highest point
- Elevation: 1,322 ft (403 m)
- Coordinates: 45°55′44″N 118°23′49″W

Geography
- Location: Umatilla County, Oregon, U.S.
- Topo map: USGS Milton-Freewater

Columbia Heights is a mountain in Umatilla County in the U.S. state of Oregon, near the city of Milton-Freewater. The summit is at an elevation of 1,322 feet (403 m).
