= Columbia Heights station =

Washington Metro station

Columbia Heights
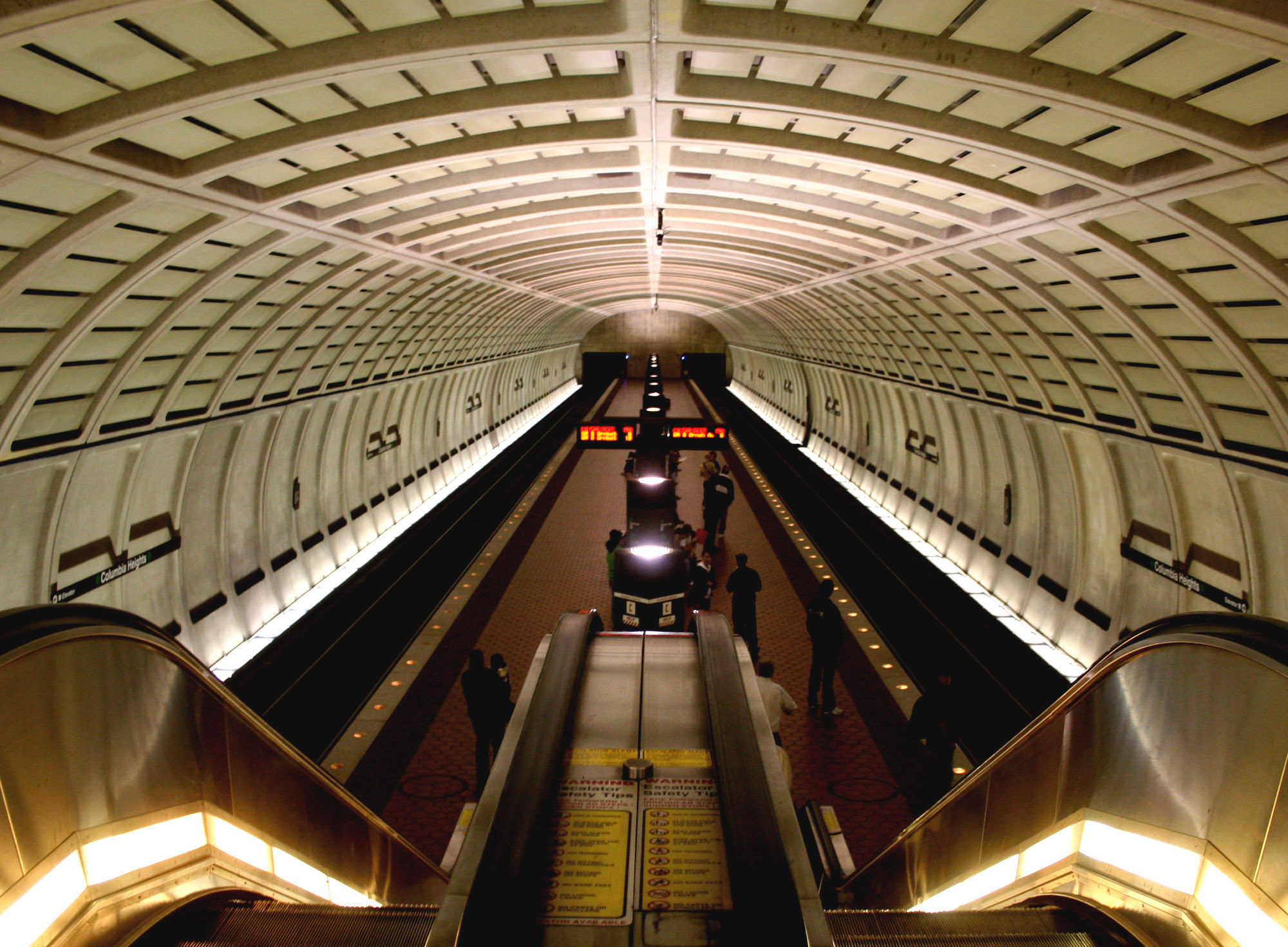
- Station platform viewed from mezzanine in October 2006

General information
- Location: 3030 14th Street NW; Washington, D.C.
- Coordinates: 38.928718°N 77.032442°W
- Owner: Washington Metropolitan Area Transit Authority
- Platforms: 1 island platform
- Tracks: 2
- Connections: Metrobus: C61, D50, D5X, D60, D6X, D74

Construction
- Structure type: Underground
- Cycle facilities: Capital Bikeshare, 4 racks and 12 lockers
- Accessible: Yes

Other information
- Station code: E04

History
- Opened: September 18, 1999

Passengers
- 2025: 9,071 (average weekday)
- Rank: 13 of 98

Services
Preceding station	Washington Metro	Following station
U Street toward Huntington	Yellow Line	Georgia Avenue–Petworth toward Greenbelt
U Street toward Branch Avenue	Green Line	Georgia Avenue–Petworth toward Greenbelt
Route map
Location

Columbia Heights station is a Washington Metro station in Washington, D.C., on the Green and Yellow Lines. Due to successful redevelopment since the station's opening, Columbia Heights is one of the busiest Metro stops outside the downtown core, with over four million exits in 2010.

== Station layout ==
The station has an island platform located underneath 14th Street, with an entrance at the intersection with Irving Street. It also features the "Arch II" design found at Congress Heights, Georgia Avenue-Petworth, Glenmont, and Mount Vernon Square.

=== Public art ===
Installed in 1999, Woven Identities is a mural and wall sculpture located in the Metro station. Installed as part of the DC Commission on the Arts and Humanities public art agenda the piece was created by D.C. architect Meghan Walsh, AIA and youth from Casa Del Pueblo Community Center. A series of painted panels, which appear like mosaics, the mural is abstract featuring faces representing the diversity of the Columbia Heights neighborhood. Neon lights of many colors glow from behind the framed painted mosaics. The piece was removed for repairs in 2024.

== History ==
The station is located in Northwest Washington at 14th and Irving Streets (entrances at both the Southwest and Northeast corners), serving both the Columbia Heights and Mount Pleasant neighborhoods. It is also close to the Adams Morgan neighborhood. Service began on September 18, 1999.

On May 7, 2023, the northeastern terminus of the Yellow Line was truncated from Greenbelt to Mount Vernon Square, following its reopening after a nearly eight-month-long major rehabilitation project on its bridge over the Potomac River and its tunnel leading into L'Enfant Plaza. Half of all Yellow Line trains were re-extended to Greenbelt on December 31, 2025.
