= Glenmont station =

Washington Metro station

Glenmont
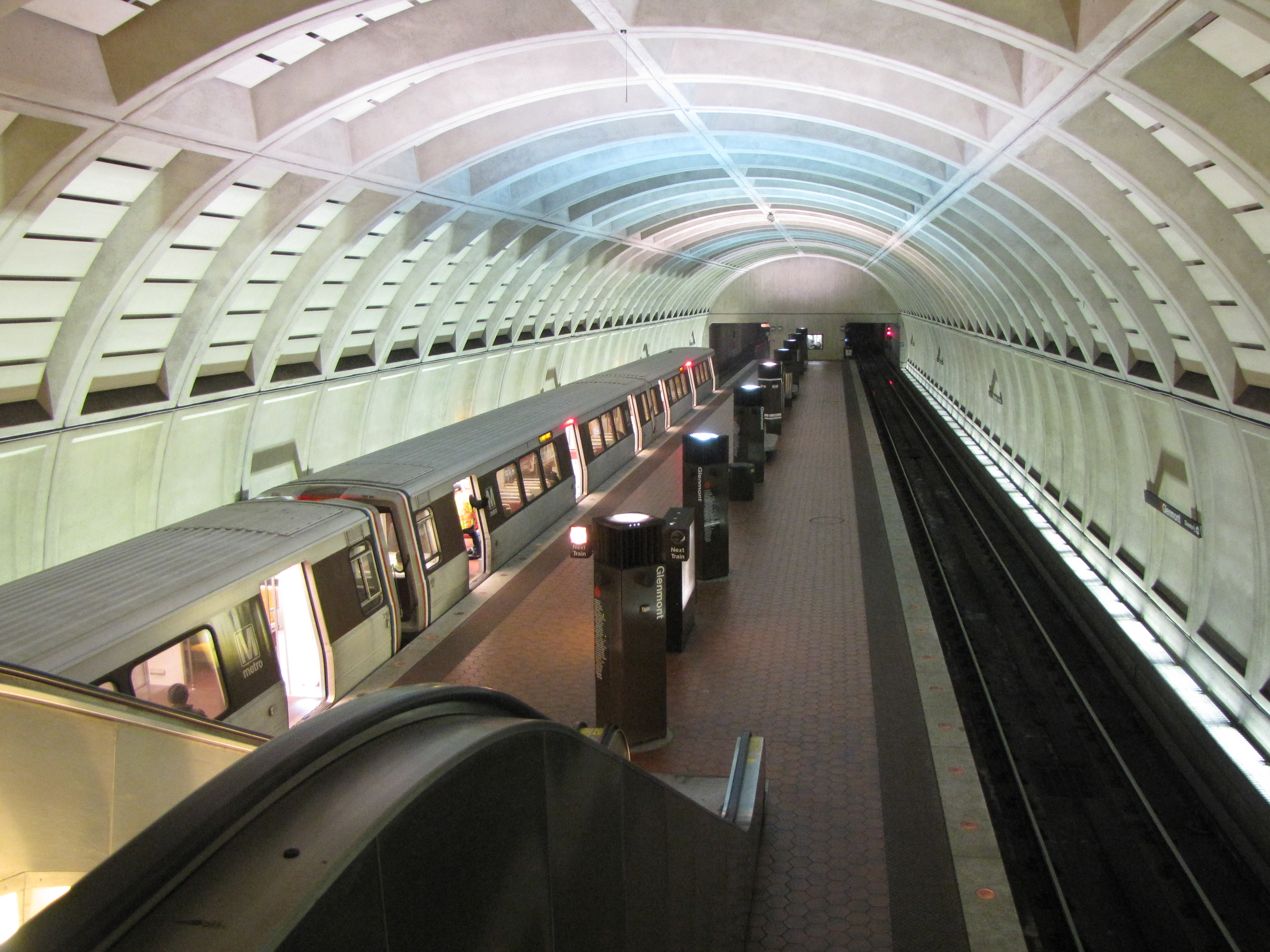
- Glenmont station platform seen from the mezzanine

General information
- Location: 12501 Georgia Avenue; Glenmont, Maryland
- Coordinates: 39°03′44″N 77°03′12″W
- Owner: Washington Metropolitan Area Transit Authority
- Platforms: 1 island platform
- Tracks: 2
- Connections: Metrobus: M20, M22, M42, M44; Ride On: 26, 31, 33, 39, 41, 49, 51, 53

Construction
- Structure type: Underground
- Parking: 2,998 spaces
- Cycle facilities: 36 racks, 48 lockers
- Accessible: Yes

Other information
- Station code: B11

History
- Opened: July 25, 1998; 28 years ago

Passengers
- 2025: 3,865 (average weekday)
- Rank: 47 of 98

Services
Preceding station	Washington Metro	Following station
Wheaton toward Shady Grove	Red Line	Terminus
Route map
Location

Glenmont station is a Washington Metro station in Montgomery County, Maryland on the Red Line. It is the eastern terminus of the Red Line.

The station, located at Georgia Avenue and Layhill Road, serves the suburbs of Glenmont and Aspen Hill. Service began on July 25, 1998.

== Station layout ==
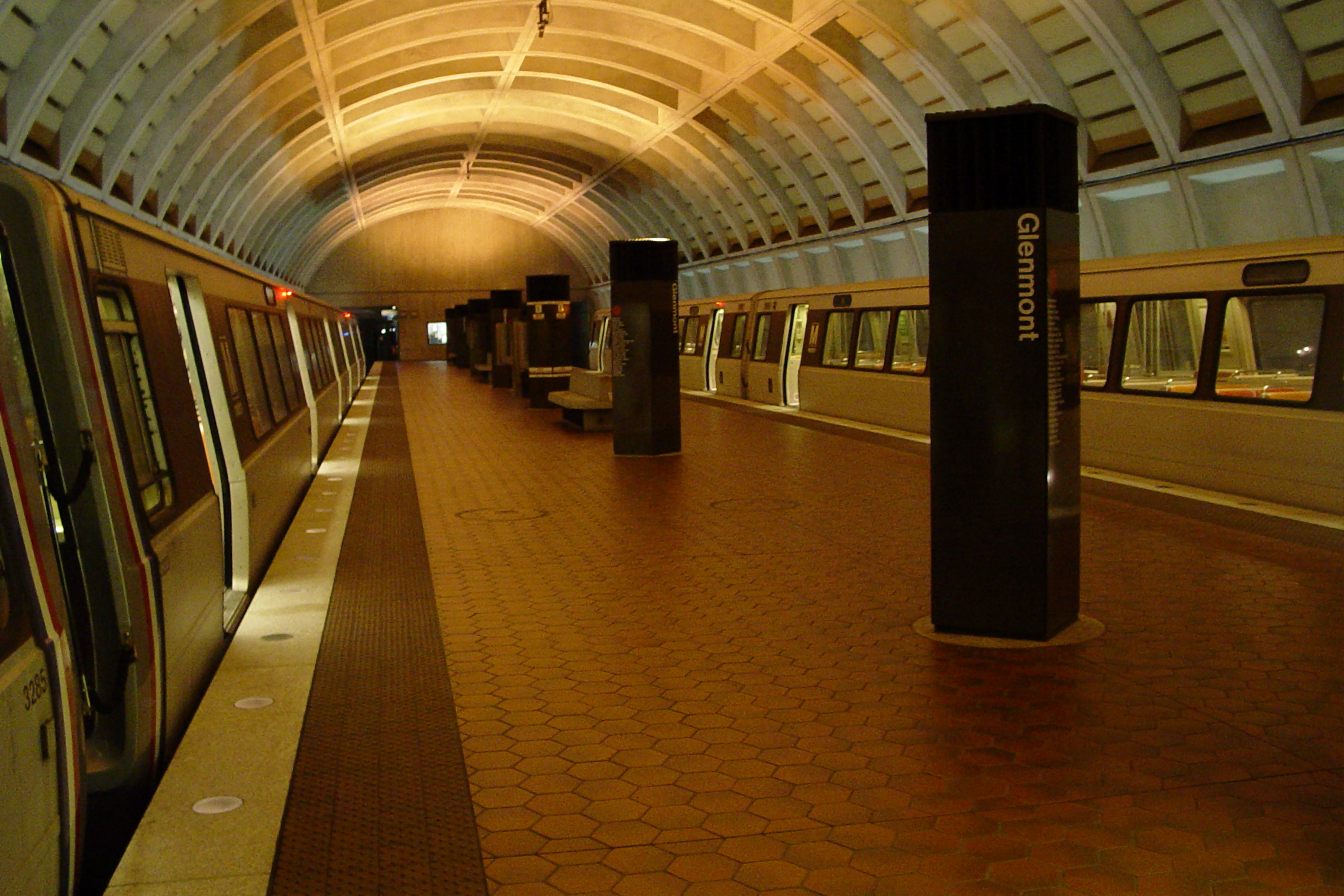
Interior of the station, photographed in 2003 with the original lighting

Glenmont is the only station on the Red Line to feature the six-coffer arch design, which is also seen on the Green and Yellow lines. It is one of only two underground terminus stations in the Washington Metro (the other is Mount Vernon Square), and until 2006, it was also the only station in the system lit with sodium-vapor lamps. These lamps gave the station a warm orange glow and were later replaced with the mercury vapor lamps found in other underground stations. The Glenmont rail yard is located just beyond this station and has the ability to store 132 rail cars.

There are two street-level access points for the station, located on either side of Georgia Avenue (Route 97). Unlike older Metro stations, there are two street elevators serving the mezzanine, though there is only one elevator between the mezzanine and platform levels. The station is compliant with the Americans with Disabilities Act of 1990. However, the station lacks backup elevators leading to the platform. In the event that the elevator is not operational, shuttle service is provided to the next station. Many Metrobus routes serve the station.

There is a parking lot north of the station that was originally purchased by the county for the proposed Foxhall Elementary School and Layhill Junior High School, neither of which were built.

It also features the "Arch II" design found at Columbia Heights, Congress Heights, Georgia Avenue-Petworth, and Mount Vernon Square.

== History ==
=== Early planning ===
Glenmont was planned to be the location of the end of a line in the original layout of the Metrorail system that was approved in 1968. Two months later, the Glenmont Vicinity Citizens Association and several other citizens' groups attempted to have the line end at Silver Spring instead because they did not want the added development, and they thought the extended lines would be too expensive. There were also concerns that the line would eventually be extended to Olney, which would change its rural character. The House Interior Appropriates Subcommittee was not convinced, and the plan went along unchanged. At the time, the station was planned to open in 1979.

As of 1970, the site for building the station was vacant land zoned for residential use and owned by Georgia Avenue Baptist Church. Safeway wanted to build a supermarket on the site, and it petitioned the county to change the site from residential to commercial zoning in 1970. Metro had not planned to purchase the land until 1975. WMATA protested, saying that rezoning would add $750,000 to the value of the land, which would increase its costs when it later needed to purchase the land. WMATA could not purchase the land at the time because engineering studies determining the exact placement of the station had not yet been completed and, regardless, it had not appropriated the funds to purchase the land yet.

Metro asked Montgomery County to purchase the land to hold for its eventual use, but the county declined when WMATA could not guarantee that engineering studies would later find the site suitable for the station. Because the surrounding land was already classified as commercial and because WMATA would not need the land for the station for at least eight more years, the Montgomery County Council said it had no authority to decline the rezoning request. Days later, a deal was struck, whereas WMATA pledged to purchase the land within three years, Montgomery County would reserve the land for WMATA, and Georgia Avenue Baptist Church would not be required to pay property tax on the land.

=== 1977 plans ===
In May 1977, Secretary of Transportation Brock Adams questioned extending the Red Line to Glenmont, citing the increased costs projected after engineers determined that the bedrock required building the tracks much deeper than had been anticipated. Under pressure from the Office of Management and Budget and President Jimmy Carter's administration, Adams requested that the line be studied again to determine whether a bus, trolley, or highway would be a good alternative to extending the red line to Glenmont. Montgomery County Executive James P. Gleason responded, saying that the line had been studied extensively already, and he considered pulling all county funding from building the Metrorail system if the Glenmont extension did not go forward.

By June, a compromise had been reached; cost-cutting measures would be studied, but the Red Line would indeed be extended to Glenmont. The following month, Gleason decided to withhold all funding to WMATA until the Department of Transportation guaranteed in writing that the Metrorail extension to Glenmont would be built. The Montgomery County Council voted in disagreement with Gleason's decision, thinking that the action might also jeopardize the Metrorail extension to Shady Grove, but the Council did not actually have the power to force him to send the money to WMATA. Maryland Secretary of Transportation Hermann Intemann also decided to withhold state funding to WMATA until Adams guaranteed the line would be built.

In October, consultants suggested building Forest Glen and Wheaton stations as two small separated tubes rather than using one large cavernous design that had been used for nearly every other underground station. The consultants said that changing the design of those two stations would save $352.6 million. Glenmont station would still be built with the cavernous underground design. Gleason praised the study because it saved significant money without sacrificing the stations, and he decided to release Montgomery County's construction funding after plans surfaced for a study by region-wide task force.

In February 1978, the Department of Transportation approved engineering studies of the Glenmont line extension, which suggesting it was warming to building the line after all. The study by a regionwide task force ended up approving the routing of stations on other Metrorail lines but it did not review the routing of the red line at all. In August, WMATA board members approved a Metrorail plan that included building the Glenmont extension as the latter phase of a two-phase construction schedule. WMATA released the plan to the Department of Transportation.

=== Delays ===
In July 1979, Adams released all held-up federal funding for all of Metrorail's lines. With all federal construction delays resolved, Glenmont metro station was scheduled to open in 1986. By 1982, the station's opening was rescheduled to 1991.

In 1984, President Reagan's administration limited the number of miles of track that could be built, effectively preventing the extending the red line from Wheaton to Glenmont. Later that year, the Senate Appropriations Committee voted to lift the construction limitation. The Reagan administration continued to block federal funding, and opening of the Glenmont station was pushed back to 1994. In 1985, the Office of Management and Budget recommended halting all federal funding of construction, further jeopardizing the Glenmont extension. In 1991, Congress approved construction funding, and WMATA said the Glenmont station was scheduled to open in 1998.

President Bill Clinton's administration approved funding of the Glenmont extension in 1993. WMATA broke ground on construction of the station in 1993, and workers began laying rail lines in 1996. The station opened on July 25, 1998.

=== 2024 closing ===
On June 1, 2024, all Red Line stations north of Fort Totten, including this one were closed to allow the Maryland Transit Authority to work on the upcoming Purple Line. Takoma reopened on June 29 while the rest of the stations reopened September 1.
