= 2009 Washington Metro train collision =

2009 Washington Metro train collision may refer to:

- June 2009 Washington Metro train collision, between two revenue trains on the Red Line between Fort Totten and Takoma stations
- November 2009 Washington Metro train collision, between two non-revenue trains at the Falls Church rail yard
