= Washington Metro signaling and operation =

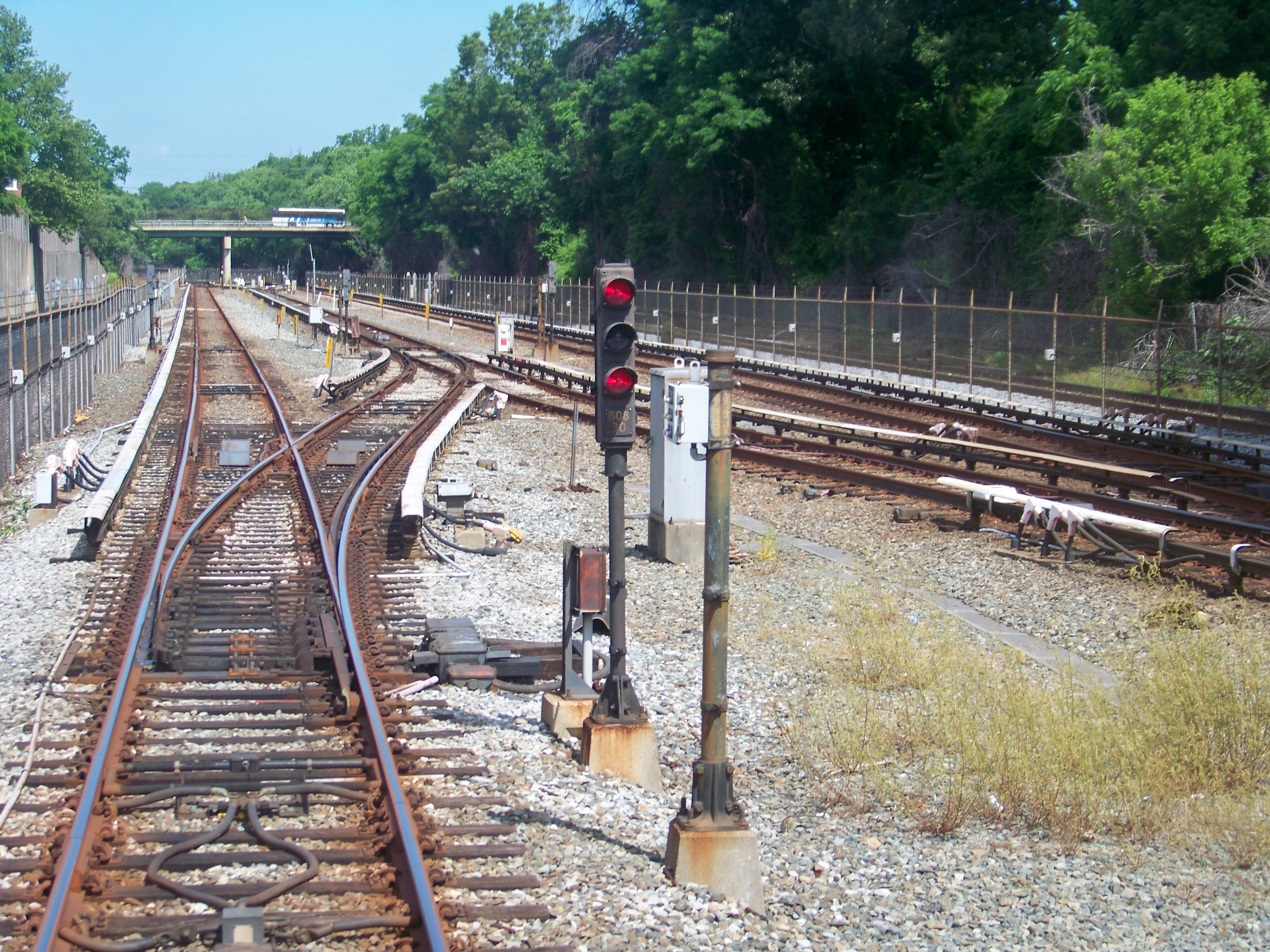
Red signal ahead of Silver Spring pocket track on the B Route.

Signaling and operation on the Washington Metro consists of a sprawling system of train controls, station identification, train signaling, signage, and train length. The Washington Metro was designed with advanced features such as Automatic Train Control, Automatic Door Opening, wayside cab signaling for speed limit enforcement, and other automation tools that make it one of the only rail rapid transit systems in the United States with such features.

== Train control ==
Metro was designed to use an Automatic Train Control (ATC) system, which comprises three sub-systems. Automatic Train Protection (ATP) protects trains by separating them so as to avoid collision. Automatic Train Supervision (ATS) routes trains and assists in maintaining adherence to schedule. Together, these two sub-systems provide input to the train's cab signals and to a third sub-system, Automatic Train Operation (ATO), which can control the trains directly. Due to a train collision in 2009 which was suspected to be caused by an ATC malfunction (although later was found to have not been caused by ATC), Metro did not use the ATO system following the accident until it was temporarily re-introduced on the Red Line in September 2014 as a test program. It was finally permanently restored in 2024 on the Red line and 2025 on all other lines.

The Automatic Train Protection sub-system uses coded track circuit technology originally supplied by Rochester, New York-based General Railway Signal when the line was constructed in the 1970s. It is a life-critical system that provides a continuous stream of information to the train regarding the maximum safe speed via the running rails. Speed commands are designed to ensure trains maintain a safe stopping distance from any obstruction and do not exceed the speed limit for any segment of track. The system stops trains in advance of any other train traffic, and before stop signals at interlockings. The cab signaling system relies on track circuits to detect track occupancy, and thus send the appropriate speed code. Although the ATP system was designed to be fail-safe, the track circuit control equipment on which it relies has been prone to parasitic oscillations which can cause the system intermittently to fail to detect the presence of a train. This resulted in the 2009 collision, after which Metro began to operate all trains manually.

The Automatic Train Supervision sub-system provides for headway management and proper interleaving of trains at junctions by speeding up or slowing down trains. The system works via a series of track mounted balises, which function as information beacons transmitting a speed code to the train as it passes overhead. Its designers intended its function to be non-vital, and for this reason, the design is not fail-safe. At no point can the ATC system override the maximum speed limit enforced by the cab signal system.

Automatic Train Operation controls trains so that, between stations, they will move at the speed specified by the automatic train protection and automatic train supervision sub-systems. All Metro trains carry train operators who work the doors, make station announcements, and supervise the train. The train operator also can control whether the train operates in automatic mode or manual mode. From November 17, 1995 until January 6, 1996, Metro management required its employees to use the automatic mode at all times. During the Blizzard of 1996, however, there was a collision on January 6 that occurred when the ATS system failed to pick up proper instructions from the wayside communication system during a snowstorm, and defaulted to the highest speed. This speed would have been safe during dry weather, but because of ice or snow, trains required additional stopping distance, which was not provided for by the ATC system.

ATO resumed on the Red Line on December 15, 2024. ATO resumed on the Green and Yellow lines on May 23, 2025, and on the Blue, Orange, and Silver lines on June 15, 2025.

An automated announcement system is equipped on the 7000-series rolling stock.

Non-revenue tracks (storage tracks, tail tracks, yard tracks) are not equipped with ATC. Green signs with letters reading "START ATC" and "END ATC" mark the beginning and ending respectively of ATC territory.

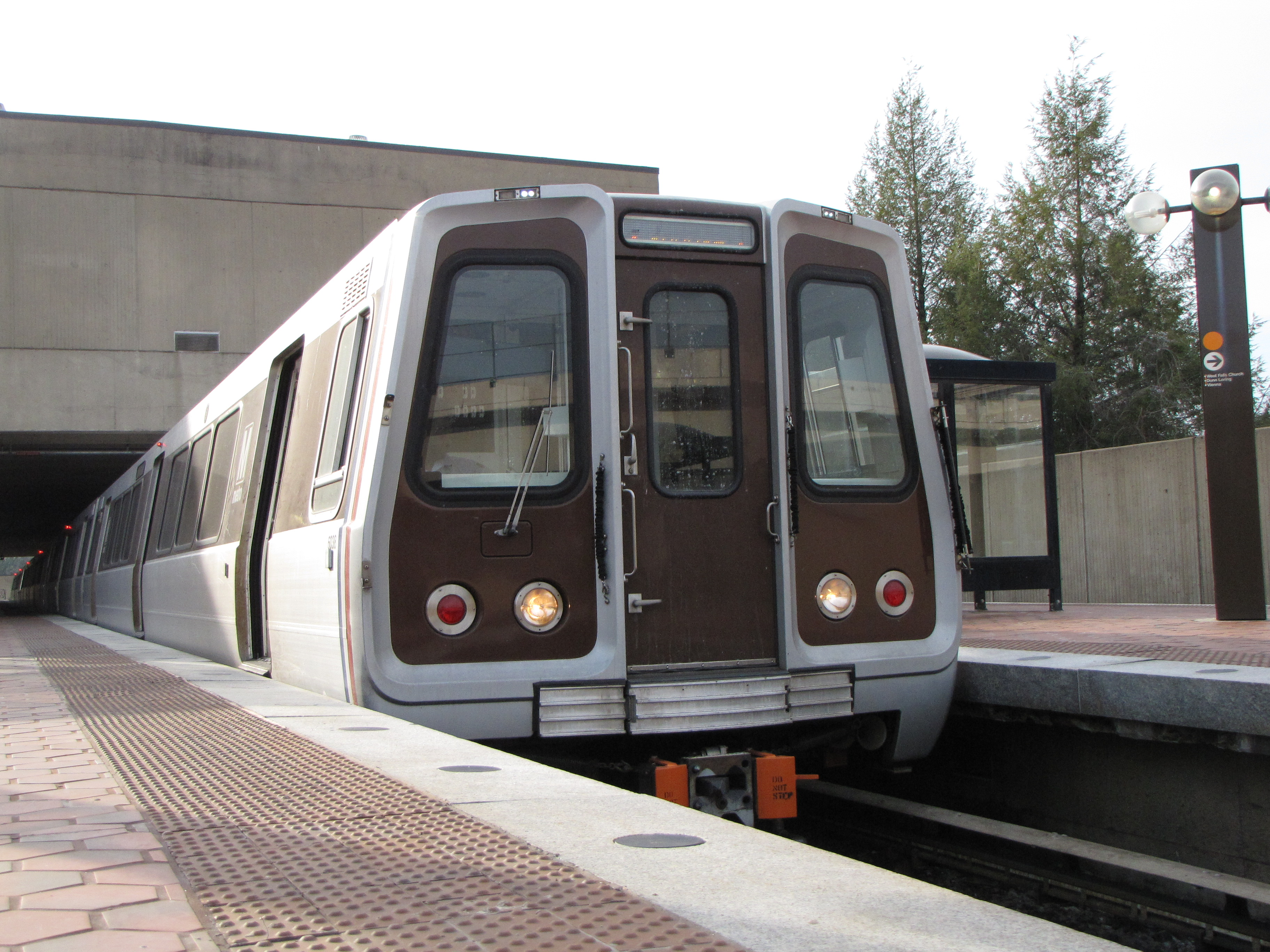
A train services the West Falls Church station from the center track, due to single-tracking west of the station.

== Route and station identification ==
The system has eleven lettered "routes" – track segments used by one or more services:

- A Route: Metro Center to Shady Grove (Red)
- B Route: Metro Center to Glenmont (Red)
- C Route: Metro Center to Huntington via Arlington Cemetery (Orange, Blue, Yellow and Silver)
- D Route: Metro Center to New Carrollton (Orange, Blue and Silver)
- E Route: Gallery Place to Greenbelt (Yellow and Green)
- F Route: Gallery Place to Branch Avenue (Yellow and Green)
- G Route: D&G Junction (east of Stadium-Armory) to Downtown Largo (Blue and Silver)
- J Route: C&J Junction (south of King Street–Old Town) to Franconia–Springfield (Blue) (Note: Original plans called for the J route to extend west to Springfield, with a spur to Franconia to be designated the H Route.)
- K Route: C&K Junction (south of Rosslyn) to Vienna (Orange and Silver)
- L Route: F&L Junction (south of L'Enfant Plaza) to C&L Junction (north of Pentagon) via Fenwick Bridge (Yellow)
- N Route: K&N Junction (east of West Falls Church) to Ashburn (Silver)

Within these routes, each station is also identified by a letter and number system based on the route letter and the station number in ascending order from the system's geographic center. For example, on the A Route, Metro Center is A01, Farragut North is A02, Dupont Circle is A03, and so on. Metro Center, Gallery Place, L'Enfant Plaza, and Fort Totten have separate numbers for each level. Gaps were left in the numbering for potential infill stations at Potomac Yard (C11) and Wolf Trap (N05), as well as for a cancelled station at Telegraph Road (J01). The infill station at NoMa–Gallaudet U did not have a planned gap and was assigned B35.

== Signaling ==
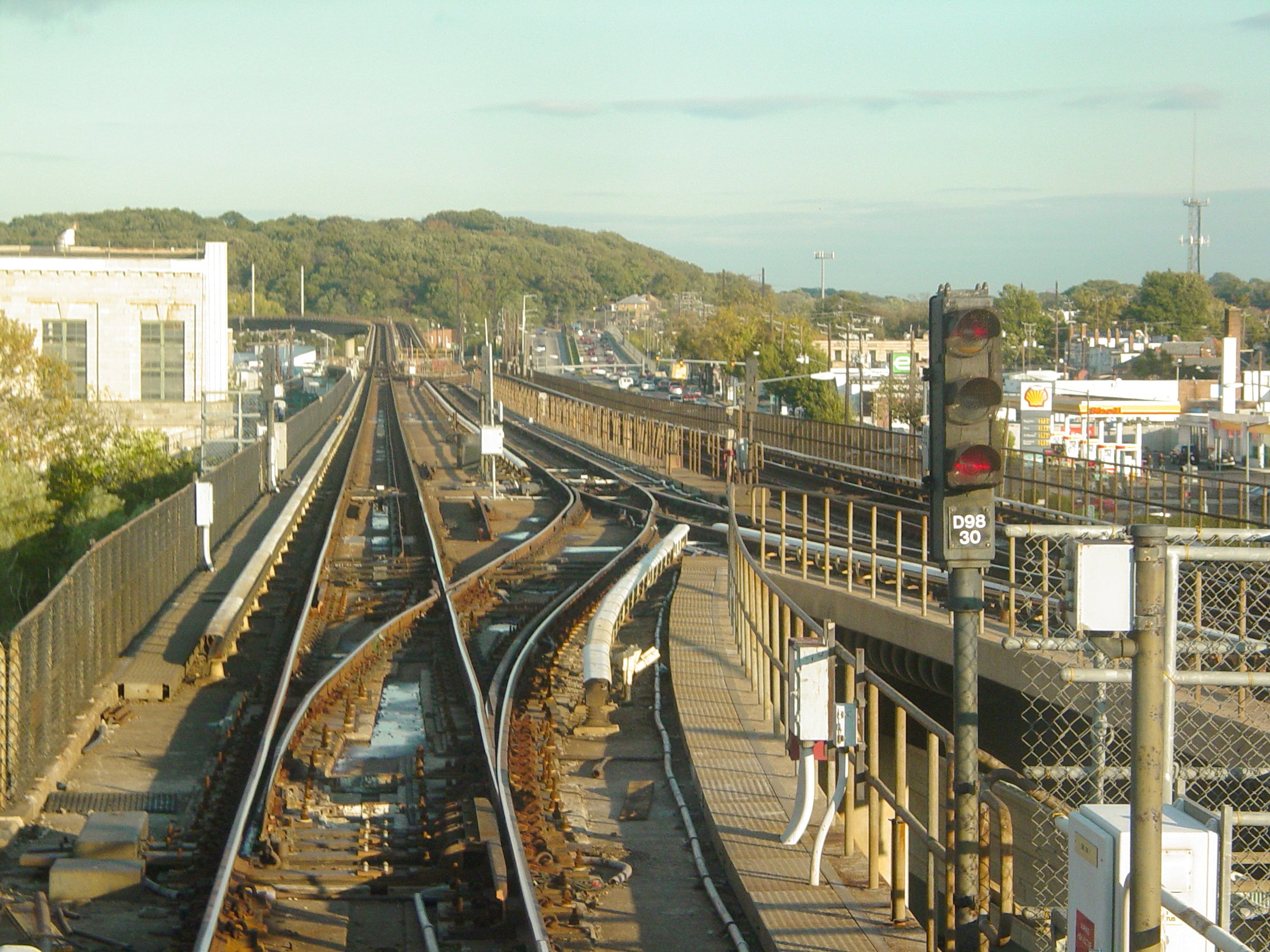
Interlocking and signal for the D Route pocket track (D98). The D&G junction is in the background. The track was to be used to turn Silver Line trains, however, safety concerns raised in December 2012 necessitated the Silver Line to be extended to Largo.

Fixed signals are only present at interlockings, and consist of three lamps: two red and one lunar. They show a red over red aspect for "stop and stay," a lunar (white) aspect for "proceed," and a flashing lunar aspect for "proceed on diverging route" (only present on newer interlockings; older interlockings are being updated with signals that show this aspect). Tracks are divided into block sections, which can only be occupied by one train at a time, a method to protect against collisions used by most railway systems worldwide, but there are generally no fixed signals to protect block sections (signals tend to be only at beginning/end of route and just before track switches). Virtual signal aspects are transmitted to the train by a cab signaling system and displayed to the operator in the cab, as well as transmitted to the ATC system. Entry into an occupied block is prevented by an automatic train protection system (ATP), which supervises both manual and ATC operation and stops the train well before it would enter an occupied block.

At switches entering into pocket tracks in a direction reverse to the normal operating direction, there is a "P Signal". The P Signal is a single lunar signal that displays the letter "P" and is found at the entrance to some but not all pocket tracks and other selected main line interlockings in the reverse direction of the normal flow of traffic. Below the P signal on the same post is a punch box to allow the train operator to manually set the switch to the diverting direction (reverse) when the P Signal is lit. The P signal is only lit when a train occupies the two track circuit approaching the P Signal and all possible routes into the interlocking are not occupied.

The signaling system used by WMATA is a variant of a signaling system that was first introduced on the PATCO Speedline when it opened in 1969. An identical system was used by the Baltimore Metro SubwayLink from its 1983 opening until that system's conversion to CBTC-compatible signals.

== Signage ==
Two trackside signs exist: The "S"-Sign is posted at revenue tracks and indicates to the operator that a station is ahead. It is located at a distance no greater than 1200 feet (365.75 m) before a station platform. The "TB"-Sign is posted to indicate to the operator that an eight-car train (the longest used in the system) is clear of an interlocking ("turnback") when the train front is flush with the sign, and that the train can turn back in the direction from which it came on the opposite track.

== Train length ==
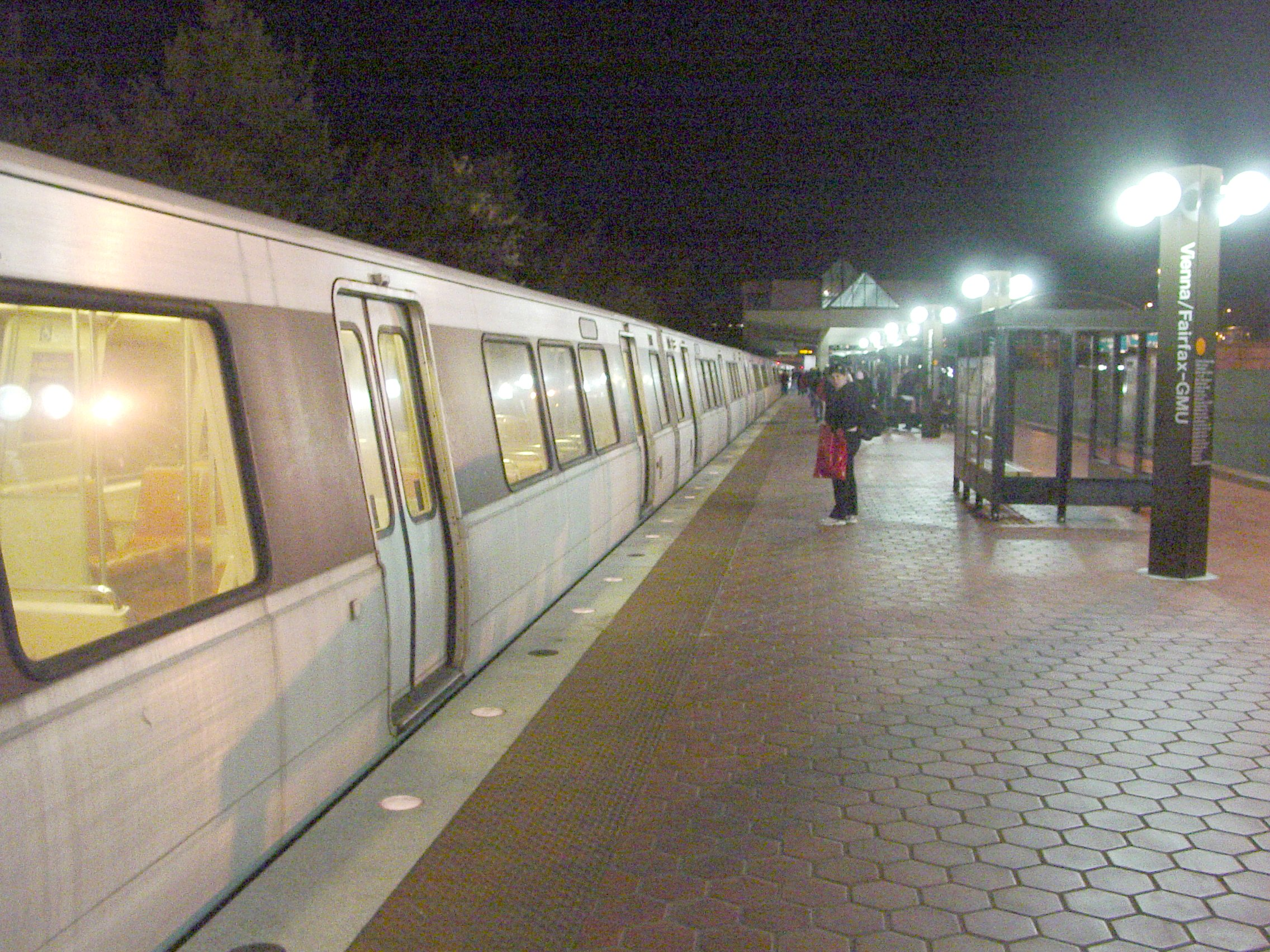
An eight-car train sits out of service at Vienna station.

When it first opened, Metro ran a mix of four- and six-car trains; however, there have not been any four-car trains used in the system (except for the money train) since the mid-2000s. At all times, a mix of six- and eight-car trainsets are used. In 2008, Metro began planning to acquire sufficient quantities of the new 7000-Series cars to run 100% eight-car trains. Metro also tested eight-car trains on the Yellow and Blue lines in preparation for increased service during the 2009 inauguration of Barack Obama.

By early 2010 it was clear that WMATA would not be able to purchase enough train cars for 100% eight-car trains and in December 2010 WMATA delayed the plans indefinitely.

In 2021, during peak hour service the Red Line ran 51% eight-car trains, the Orange Line ran 40%, and the Green Line ran 50%, while the Blue and Yellow Lines ran only six-car trains, for a total of 43 of 129 trains running at full length, or 33%.

As of 2024, 40% of all Metro trains ran with 8 cars.
