= 1982 Washington Metro train derailment =

1982 train derailment in Washington, D.C.

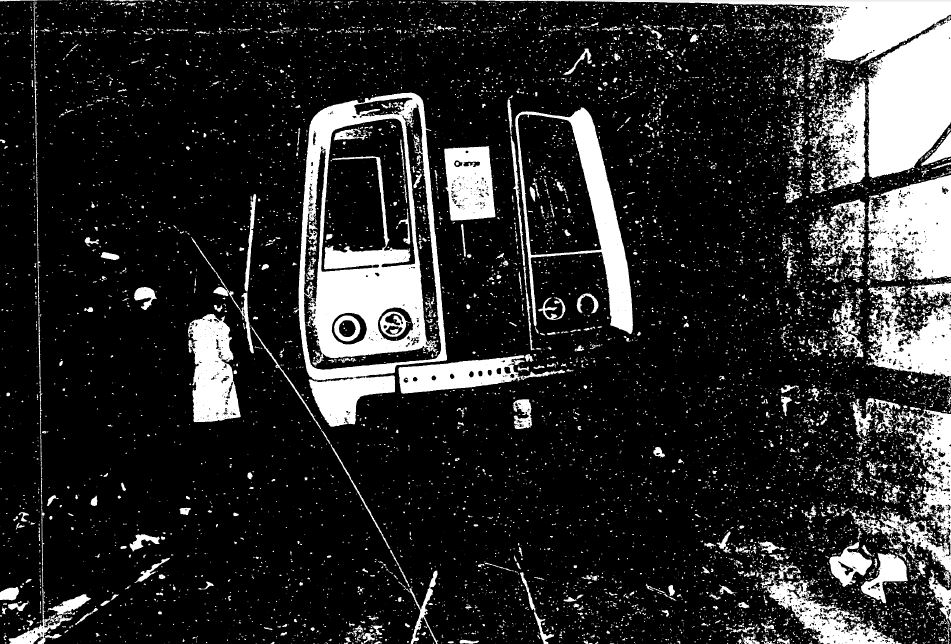
- The train being inspected after the derailment

Details
- Date: January 13, 1982; 44 years ago 4:29 p.m. EST (21:29 UTC)
- Location: Between Federal Triangle and Smithsonian stations, Washington, D.C.
- Coordinates: 38°53′26″N 77°01′44″W
- Country: United States
- Line: Orange Line
- Operator: Washington Metropolitan Area Transit Authority
- Incident type: Train derailment
- Cause: Operator error

Statistics
- Trains: 1 six-car train
- Deaths: 3
- Injured: 25

The 1982 Washington Metro train derailment was an incident involving a single Orange Line Washington Metro train during the afternoon rush hour of January 13, 1982, in Downtown Washington, D.C. in the United States. The train derailed as it was being backed up from an improperly closed rail switch between the Federal Triangle and Smithsonian stations, and caused the deaths of three passengers. Several survivors were trapped for hours, and 25 were injured. The incident was the first resulting in a fatality involving the Metro system and remained as the deadliest incident occurring in the system until the June 22, 2009 collision that resulted in nine fatalities.

The incident occurred only 30 minutes after Air Florida Flight 90 crashed at the 14th Street bridge complex, a short distance to the south, taxing emergency responders and paralyzing transportation across the Washington metropolitan area.

== Overview ==
=== Events preceding the derailment ===
On Wednesday, January 13, 1982, the Washington Metropolitan Area Transit Authority (WMATA) experienced disruptions to Blue and Orange Line services during the afternoon rush hour. At approximately 3:45 p.m. Eastern Standard Time (20:45 UTC), a westbound train was taken out of passenger service at Federal Triangle station following a reported propulsion malfunction. To reduce the resulting delays, some trains were temporarily turned back at McPherson Square station using the nearby interlocking.

Following these movements, the Operations Control Center (OCC) attempted to restore the switches at Smithsonian interlocking to their normal positions. Although the switches associated with westbound movements responded to commands, the eastbound switches remained aligned for crossover movements. The OCC was unable to establish that the switches had been correctly restored, and the interlocking signals continued to display stop indications. Consequently, trains were required to operate under manual control and proceed through the affected area only when authorised by the OCC.

Before the derailment, Train 403 passed through the affected interlocking without incident.

At approximately 4:15 p.m. EST (21:15 UTC), the OCC instructed a transportation supervisor stationed at Smithsonian interlocking to remain at the location until maintenance personnel arrived. The supervisor was subsequently instructed to unblock the switches to permit the restoration of normal operations. However, the supervisor experienced difficulty operating switch 3B using the manual crank and reported that switches 3A and 3B, although unblocked, remained in the reverse position.

The supervisor subsequently attempted to block and secure the switches. Following instructions from the OCC, Trains 904 and 415 passed through the interlocking without incident.

At approximately 4:24 p.m. EST (21:24 UTC), the supervisor reported to the OCC that the switches had been blocked and secured. On receiving this confirmation, the OCC authorised trains to continue through the interlocking. However, the switches had not been correctly positioned and secured for the authorised movements.

=== Movement of Train 410 ===
Train 410 was a six-car Blue and Orange Line service operating between National Airport and New Carrollton stations. The train consisted of six 1000-series railcars, numbered 1029, 1028, 1199, 1198, 1235 and 1234, arranged in three married pairs.

After being temporarily held near McPherson Square interlocking, Train 410 continued towards Federal Triangle. The train was heavily crowded, carrying an estimated 1,320 passengers, including approximately 220 in the leading car, No. 1029. Passenger loading was described as being at "crush capacity".

After departing Federal Triangle, Train 410 proceeded towards Smithsonian interlocking under manual control. The OCC advised the operators of Trains 410 and 906 that a supervisor stationed in the tunnel would provide instructions for passing through the affected interlocking.

On approaching signal D02-02, which was displaying a stop indication, Train 410 made the required stop. The supervisor subsequently authorised the train to proceed through the interlocking. Approximately ten seconds after giving this authorisation, the supervisor instructed the operator to stop.

The train came to a halt while occupying the crossover switches at Smithsonian interlocking. At switch 1B, a switch point was not correctly positioned against its adjacent stock rail, creating a potential route for a wheelset to follow the crossover rather than the main track.

At approximately 4:28 p.m. EST (21:28 UTC), the supervisor informed the OCC that the switch alignment appeared incorrect and indicated an intention to reverse Train 410 over the switches.

The supervisor then boarded the rear car, No. 1234, and instructed the train operator to remove the control key from the operating cab. This allowed the supervisor to take control of the train from car 1234 for the reverse movement.

=== Derailment ===
Position of damaged train after striking end barrier

At approximately 4:29 p.m. EST (21:29 UTC), the supervisor applied power from car 1234 and began reversing Train 410 towards Federal Triangle station.

During the reverse movement, a wheelset of car 1029 derailed at switch 1B. The incorrectly positioned switch caused the wheelsets of the affected car to follow different routes, with one following the main track and another entering the crossover. As the movement continued, the car was forced diagonally across the trackwork towards the crossover.

The derailed car subsequently struck a concrete barrier at the end of the crossover, causing severe structural damage to the car and its passenger compartment. The collision resulted in extensive deformation of the car body and damage to the surrounding railway infrastructure.

During the movement, the supervisor initially experienced normal train operation before the train began braking and jerking. The supervisor subsequently became aware of a loss of brake pressure and propulsion power.

The train operator, who remained in the original operating cab, contacted the supervisor through the onboard intercom and instructed the supervisor to stop the movement. However, the operator did not apply the emergency brakes, having failed to recognise that the train had derailed or that an emergency situation existed.

Following the collision, third-rail traction power was lost in the affected section of the subway. A supervisor at Federal Triangle station reported the power failure to the OCC, while the supervisor aboard Train 410 also reported that traction power was unavailable.

At approximately 4:33 p.m. EST (21:33 UTC), the supervisor reported the derailment to the OCC, advising that both tracks were obstructed and that passengers had been injured or killed.

Three passengers were killed and 25 others were injured in the derailment. The accident caused extensive damage to car 1029 and the infrastructure at Smithsonian interlocking.

The derailment occurred on the same afternoon as the crash of Air Florida Flight 90 into the 14th Street Bridge over the Potomac River. The two accidents placed additional demands on emergency services in Washington, D.C.

=== Response ===
Immediately following the derailment, an off-duty Washington Metropolitan Area Transit Authority (WMATA) police officer who was travelling aboard Train 410 began assisting passengers in the damaged car. After leaving the car, the officer observed electrical arcing near the damaged third rail, presenting an additional hazard to passengers and emergency personnel.

Approximately five minutes after the collision, the supervisor aboard Train 410 informed the Operations Control Center (OCC) that an attempt would be made to evacuate the passengers. Many passengers in the undamaged cars were initially unaware that a derailment had occurred. Supervisors 31 and 35 subsequently coordinated the evacuation of the train.

Passengers travelling in the undamaged cars were evacuated approximately 40 to 45 minutes after the derailment. However, evacuation of the damaged car was delayed because of the electrical hazards associated with the damaged third rail. At approximately 4:57 p.m. Eastern Standard Time (21:57 UTC), traction power to the affected section was confirmed to have been disconnected, allowing the off-duty police officer to receive authorisation to evacuate passengers from the damaged car.

Emergency services were notified of the derailment at approximately 4:34 p.m. EST (21:34 UTC). Firefighters and emergency medical personnel were dispatched to the scene, with the first fire apparatus arriving at the station at approximately 4:53 p.m. EST (21:53 UTC). Emergency personnel subsequently assisted with passenger evacuation, treatment of the injured and recovery operations.

The emergency response was complicated by hazardous weather conditions and the simultaneous demands placed on emergency services following the crash of Air Florida Flight 90 into the 14th Street Bridge over the Potomac River approximately 30 minutes earlier. The two incidents placed considerable pressure on Washington, D.C.'s emergency response resources.

Following the derailment, Blue and Orange Line services were suspended between McPherson Square and Federal Center SW stations. Shuttle buses were introduced to transport passengers around the affected section of the network while emergency operations and recovery work continued.

The damaged train and associated debris were subsequently removed from the tunnel, and repairs were undertaken to restore the affected infrastructure. Full service through the affected section was not restored until the evening of January 15, 1982, approximately two days after the derailment.

=== Fatalities ===
Of the approximately 1,320 passengers aboard Train 410, three were killed and 25 were injured. The fatalities occurred in the leading car, No. 1029, which sustained extensive structural damage when it collided with the concrete barrier at Smithsonian interlocking.

The derailment was the first fatal accident involving passengers on the Washington Metro system and remained its deadliest accident until June 22, 2009, when a collision between two Red Line trains resulted in nine deaths.

== Aftermath ==
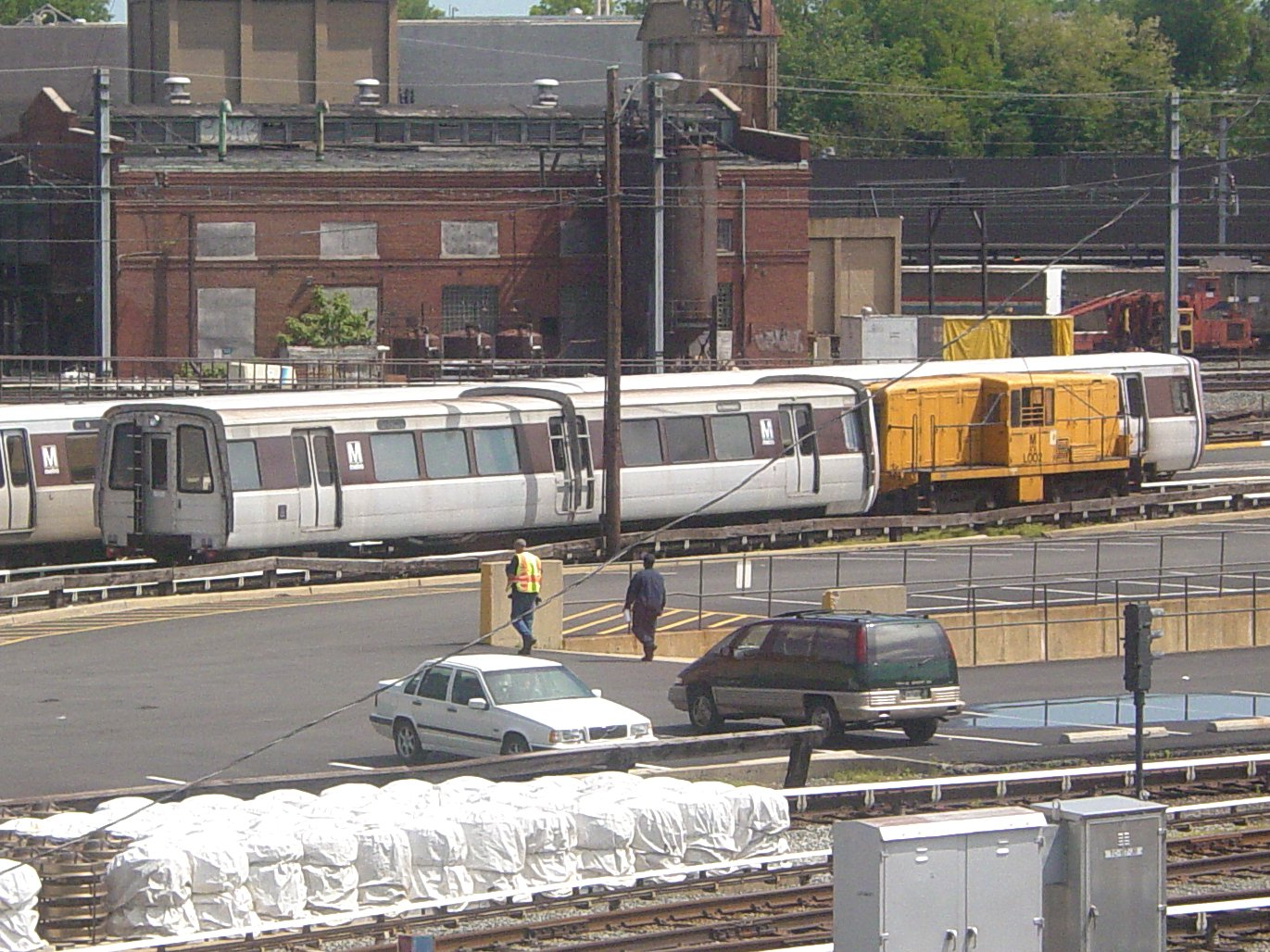
Car 1028 which was converted into work service following the collision

=== Investigation and findings ===
Investigations conducted by the National Transportation Safety Board (NTSB) and the Washington Metropolitan Area Transit Authority (WMATA) identified a series of operational errors, procedural deficiencies and failures in the handling of the malfunctioning switches at Smithsonian interlocking. The investigation concluded that the derailment resulted from a combination of human error and inadequate operational safeguards rather than a single isolated failure.

A WMATA investigation identified 11 errors involving a transportation supervisor, including failures to correctly assess and secure the malfunctioning switches and to ensure that train movements could be undertaken safely. The train operator was also found to have failed to follow established operating procedures after passing through the affected interlocking. Additional deficiencies were identified in the OCC's monitoring of the switch malfunction and its instructions to personnel at the scene.

The NTSB investigation identified deficiencies in the procedures governing the manual operation of trains through malfunctioning interlockings, the securing and verification of switch positions, and communication between the OCC, transportation supervisors and train operators. The investigation also examined the decision to reverse Train 410 after it had stopped within the interlocking and the failure to recognise the derailment before the collision with the concrete barrier.

The findings prompted a review of WMATA's operating procedures, employee training and supervisory practices, particularly those relating to abnormal train movements and the management of signalling and switch failures.

=== Safety improvements ===
Following the accident, WMATA examined measures to improve passenger protection and reduce the consequences of future derailments and collisions. These included consideration of modifications to the structural design of its railcars to improve resistance to side impacts.

In April 1982, WMATA commissioned an additional study into the structural integrity of its railcars, including the possibility of incorporating additional steel reinforcement to provide greater protection to passengers during side-impact collisions.

The derailment also contributed to changes in WMATA's approach to emergency passenger evacuation. Before the accident, passengers were generally instructed to remain aboard disabled trains until authorised personnel arrived, partly because of the electrical hazards posed by the system's 750-volt direct-current third rail. Concerns about unauthorised use and potential misuse of emergency exits had also influenced the system's evacuation arrangements.

Following a review of these arrangements, WMATA introduced measures to provide passengers with greater ability to evacuate railcars during emergencies. By July 1985, emergency door-release handles were being installed in Metrorail cars to allow passengers to open the doors in circumstances such as a fire or other emergency requiring evacuation.

=== Damage and rolling stock ===
The derailment caused extensive damage to the train and railway infrastructure at Smithsonian interlocking. Car 1029 sustained catastrophic structural damage when it collided with the concrete barrier and was subsequently scrapped at the accident site.

Approximately 200 feet (61 metres) of track and associated switches were destroyed, while approximately 80 feet (24 metres) of third rail required replacement or repair. Two automatic train control circuit loops were destroyed, and additional signalling equipment was damaged.

The NTSB estimated the total property damage resulting from the accident at $1,325,000 (1982 US dollars).

Car 1028, which had been coupled to car 1029 as part of a permanently coupled pair, survived the accident and was subsequently converted for departmental use. It later served as a clearance inspection vehicle, commonly known as a feeler car, used to identify potential obstructions and verify clearances throughout the Metrorail network. The vehicle was retired from service in April 2016.

== See also ==
- Incidents on the Washington Metro
- Air Florida Flight 90 – a plane crash that happened 30 minutes earlier one mile away.
