= Daniel Kaniewski =

American politician

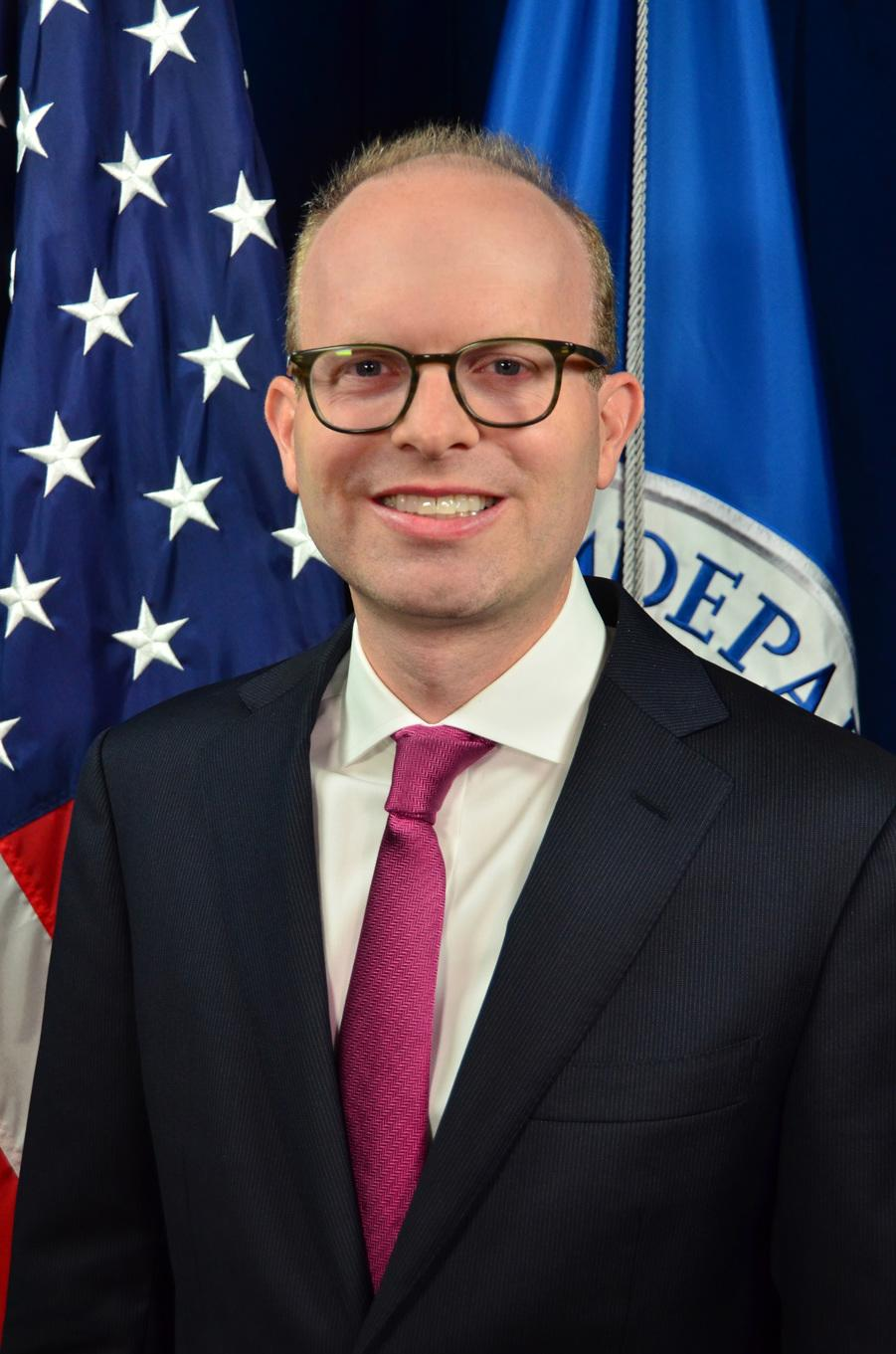
- Official portrait, 2017

Deputy Administrator for Resilience of the Federal Emergency Management Agency
- In office September 14, 2017 – January 31, 2020
- President: Donald Trump

Acting Deputy Administrator of the Federal Emergency Management Agency
- In office September 14, 2017 – October 11, 2018
- President: Donald Trump

Special Assistant to the President for Homeland Security and Senior Director for Response Policy
- In office March 2007 – August 2008
- President: George W. Bush

Personal details
- Party: Republican
- Education: George Washington University (BS); Georgetown University (MA); George Washington University (PhD)

Daniel Kaniewski is a former American government official who served as the deputy administrator for resilience at the Federal Emergency Management Agency. He also served as the acting deputy administrator of FEMA. He was subsequently appointed to the DHS Homeland Security Advisory Council.

== Career ==
Earlier in his career, Kaniewski served as director of response and recovery policy and later as special assistant to the president for homeland security and senior director for response policy in the White House. Kaniewski began his career as a firefighter and paramedic.

Prior to being confirmed by the United States Senate for his role at FEMA, Kaniewski was vice president for global resilience at AIR Worldwide, a Verisk business, and a senior fellow at George Washington University's Center for Cyber and Homeland Security. He also served as the mission area director for resilience and emergency preparedness/response at the Homeland Security Studies and Analysis Institute and as an adjunct professor at the Georgetown University School of Foreign Service.

After his departure from FEMA in 2020, Kaniewski joined Marsh McLennan as managing director, public sector. In 2026, he founded Northstar Risk & Resilience, a disaster risk and resilience advisory firm.
