= June 2009 Washington Metro train collision =

2009 public transit accident in the neighborhood of Northeast, Washington, D.C.

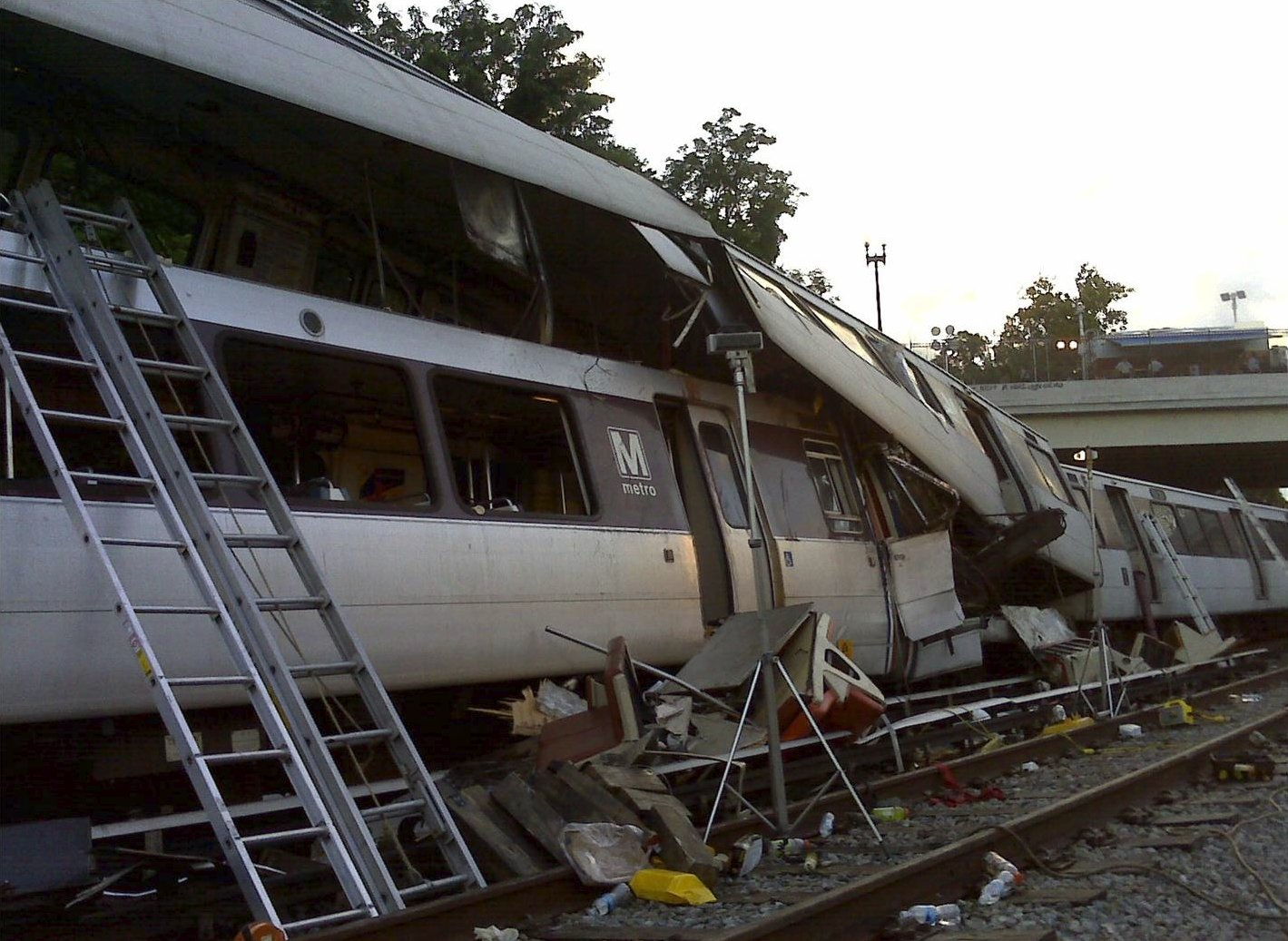
- NTSB photo of crash scene

Details
- Date: June 22, 2009; 17 years ago 17:02 EDT (21:02 UTC)
- Location: Between Takoma and Fort Totten, Northeast, Washington, D.C.
- Coordinates: 38°57′37″N 77°0′21″W
- Country: United States
- Line: Red Line
- Operator: Washington Metropolitan Area Transit Authority
- Incident type: Train collision/telescoping
- Cause: Track circuit malfunction

Statistics
- Trains: 2 (2 six-car trains)
- Deaths: 9 (including a train operator)
- Injured: Approximately 80

During the afternoon rush hour of June 22, 2009, a subway train wreck occurred between two southbound Red Line Washington Metro trains in Northeast Washington, D.C., United States. A moving train collided with a train stopped ahead of it; the train operator along with eight passengers died, and 80 people were injured, making it the deadliest crash in the history of the Washington Metro.

The National Transportation Safety Board (NTSB) investigation found that after a June 17 replacement of a track circuit component at what became the crash site, the track circuit had been suffering from parasitic oscillations that left it unable to reliably report when that stretch of track was occupied by a train. The struck train came to a stop because of traffic ahead. Because the entire train was within the faulty circuit, it became invisible to the Automatic Train Control (ATC) system. The train behind it was therefore commanded to proceed at 55 mph (89 km/h). The operator of the striking train applied the emergency brake after the stopped train came into full view, but there was not enough time to prevent the collision, which occurred at approximately 49 mph (79 km/h).

== Collision ==
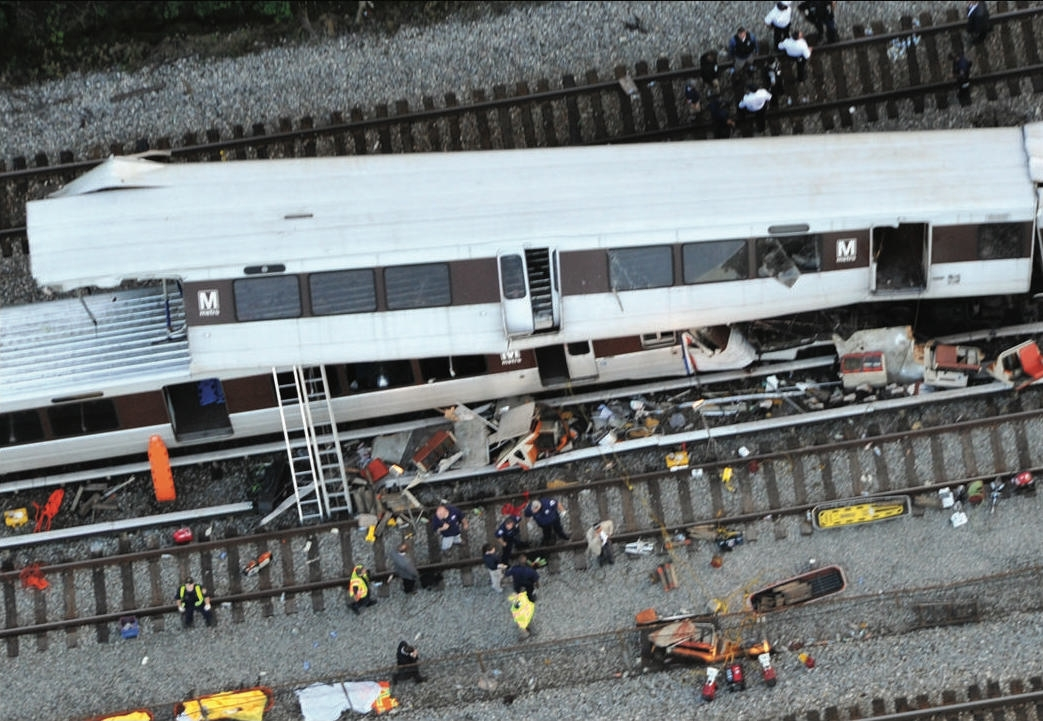
Aerial view of emergency responders at the crash

=== Rolling stock involved ===
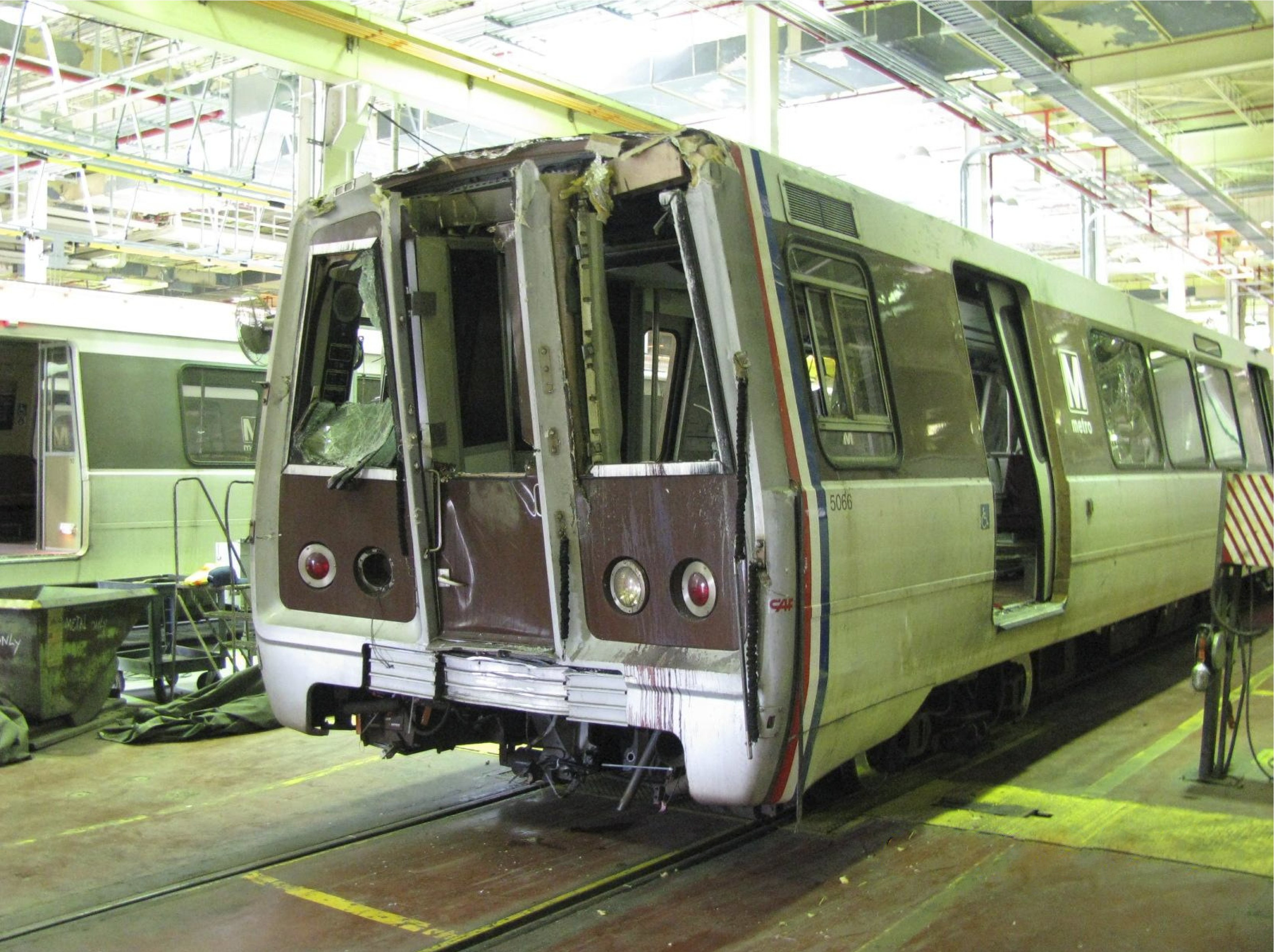
Car 5066 following the collision being investigated by the NTSB.

Train 112 (the moving train) was made up of cars 1079, 1078, 1071, 1070, 1130 and 1131—all from the 1000-series. Train 214 (the stationary train) was made up of cars 3036, 3037, 3257, 3256, 5067 and 5066, from the Breda 3000-series and the CAF 5000-series respectively. The cars are equipped with on-board systems called Automatic Train Operation and Automatic Train Control, which allow autonomous operation with little human intervention.

=== Accident Sequence ===
On June 17, 2009, technicians ran maintenance on track circuits between Fort Totten station and Takoma station, as part of a system-wide track circuit replacement program. This includes replacing an impedance bond for circuit B2-304 near Fort Totten station. During the installation, the Operations Control Center reported that circuit B2-304 began “bobbing” (intermittently losing detection) due to electrical issues, where the circuit would keep showing if the tracks are occupied or unoccupied, even if a train was not present on the circuit. The Operations Control Center began a work order for circuit B2-304, but the repairs were not acted on, despite maintenance crews visiting the sections prior. Between June 17 and June 22, trains passing through the section would experience a loss of speed commands in the controls, but would resume once they reached the next circuit, B2-303. Due to this, operators did not report the issue.

On June 22, 2009, Train 214 began its rush hour run from Silver Spring station, heading to Grosvenor–Strathmore station, operating in manual mode. Following behind Train 214 was Train 112, also beginning its rush hour run from Silver Spring station, heading to Shady Grove station, operating in automatic mode. Due to an earlier train malfunction, trains were congested outside of Fort Totten station. After Train 214 left Takoma station, it was following Train 110 closely, with Train 214 slowing down multiple times.

At approximately 4:55 pm EDT (20:55 UTC), Train 112 left Takoma station. One minute later, Train 112 received a 0 mph speed limit due to the presence of Train 214. At the same time, Train 214 entered the faulty B2-304 track circuit, receiving a loss of speed commands. The operator of Train 214 manually slowed his train down and stopped the train completely. However, Train 214 stopped on top of the faulty B2-304 track circuit, making the Automatic Train Control computer indicate the tracks were cleared ahead, and failing to detect Train 214. As a result, at 4:57 pm EDT, Train 112 was given a 55 mph speed limit and the train began moving. At 4:58 pm EDT (20:58 UTC), at 53 mph, Train 112 had a clear view of Train 214 ahead. Train 112's operator Jeanice McMillan applied the emergency brakes, managing to slow Train 112 to 44 mph. However the collision was already unavoidable.

Train 112 collided with Train 214 at 44 mph. The first railcar of Train 112 (Car 1079), overrode and telescoped on top of car 5066 from Train 214, causing severe structural damage on Car 1079. While stopped outside Fort Totten, the operator of Train 214 felt a "strong push", hearing noise at the end of his train, and lost power in his car. The operator looked outside his cab window and noticed a train "kind of like on top” of his train, thinking a CSX freight train derailed. Train 214's operator went to investigate, carrying a portable radio due to the operator thinking the public address system was inoperable due to the loss of power. As the operator walked through the trains, he noticed many passengers knocked out their seats from the impact, and tried to contact the Operations Control Center using the portable radio and his personal cell phone, but the attempt was unsuccessful. Later, it was determined that the Operations Control Center personnel could hear the operator, but the operator was unable to hear their responses.

After the operator got to the fourth car, he encountered smoke, and told passengers to move forward on the train. Then the operator applied the emergency release lever in the car to open one of the train doors, from which he jumped to the ground to investigate. After realizing a collision had occurred, the operator successfully established communications with Metro Control and reported the collision, also asking for both electrical power on the third rail to be cut, and requested emergency medical assistance to the injured passengers. The operator then reboarded the train to help injured and trapped passengers.

Following the collision, a Red Line controller at the Operations Control Center showed the third rail on the inbound track de-energized between Takoma and Fort Totten stations on his display screen. Also, a graphical representation of Train 112 was showing to be occupying the Control Center's display screen. The controller attempted to contact Train 112, but received no response. The controller did hear Train 214's operator reporting a collision.

An employee from Metrorail's car equipment maintenance was at Fort Totten station at the time of the accident. The controller from the Operations Control Center sent the employee to the accident area to verify any information that the OCC was receiving, and ordered all trains in the area to hold at stations. At 5:10 pm EDT, the Operations Control Center cut power on the adjacent track following the collision.

== Response ==
At 5:20 pm, rescuers first entered car 1079, the lead car of train 112. This car had telescoped over the rear car of the stationary train, trapping many passengers who required rescue by emergency workers using ladders for access. Survivors described the crash as "like... hit[ting] a concrete wall," with air clouded by smoke and debris, and panic among passengers when car doors did not immediately open.

Dennis Oglesby, a United States Army soldier, and Martin Griffith, an Army contractor and former Army soldier, who were in the lead train and were uninjured in the collision, helped passengers evacuate from their train, most of whom appeared to have minor injuries. Oglesby and Griffith then noticed that six to eight people from the other train had been ejected by the force of the collision and were more seriously injured. One person from the overtaking train had been thrown onto the roof of the stationary train and had suffered a severe head wound. Oglesby and Martin gave first aid to the more seriously injured victims until help arrived, and informed responding emergency personnel that the rails were still powered and needed to be shut down.

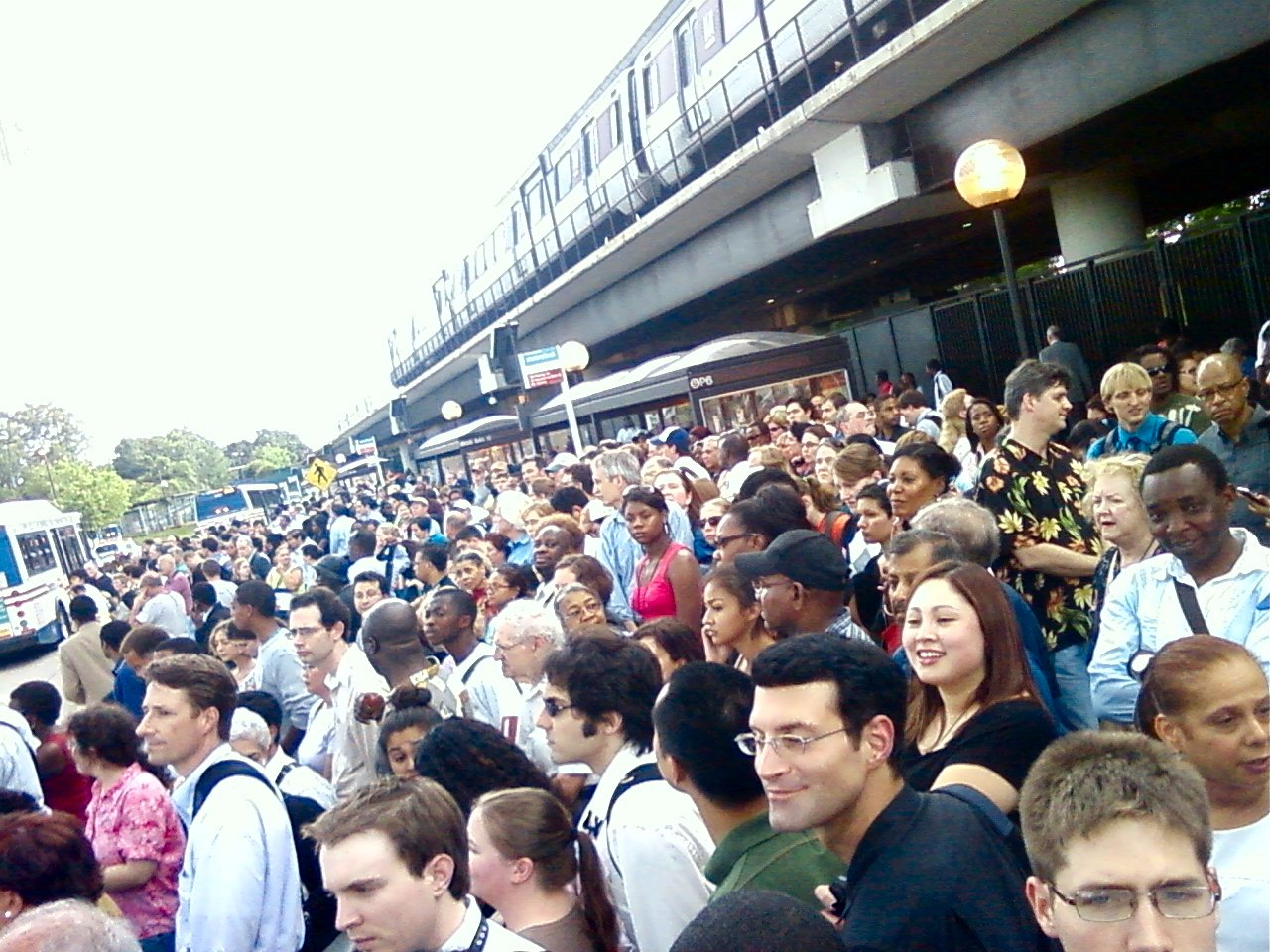
Evening rush hour commuters waiting to board shuttle buses at the Rhode Island Avenue–Brentwood station on the evening of the collision

Immediately following the collision, firefighters and paramedics from the District of Columbia Fire and Emergency Medical Services Department were dispatched to the Takoma Metro station, and arrived at the location of the collision soon after. D.C. Fire Chief Dennis Rubin stated that the initial 9-1-1 emergency calls made the incident seem small, but after firefighters arrived on scene, they dispatched mass casualty incident teams. Within two hours, more than 200 firefighters were on-scene in response to the three-alarm incident. Rescuers worked through the night of June 22, using cranes and heavy rescue equipment to free trapped passengers and search for bodies.

Fire Chief Dennis Rubin initially confirmed four fatalities (including the train operator) and 74 injuries, 14 of which were considered moderate and 6 critical. Five of the dead were discovered in the wreckage and removed from the site of the collision on the morning of June 23, as cranes dismantling the wrecked trains revealed the bodies. Nine fatalities were eventually confirmed. Jeanice McMillan, 42, of Springfield, Virginia, the train operator, died while attempting to stop the train and was later commended for her efforts. Major General (ret.) David F. Wherley Jr. of the District of Columbia Air National Guard – known for deploying fighter jets to defend Washington, D.C. during the September 11 attacks – died in the collision along with his wife, Ann; the other passengers who died in the crash were Lavonda King, Veronica DuBose, Cameron Williams, Dennis Hawkins, Mary Doolittle, and Ana Fernandez. An additional 80 people were injured. The death toll makes the crash the deadliest in Metro history.

According to Daniel Kaniewski, a former George W. Bush administration Homeland Security official now with the Homeland Security Policy Institute at George Washington University, the overall emergency response was "calm and ordered," indicating that U.S. emergency response "during extraordinary incidents [has] significantly improved" since the September 11 attacks.

=== Service disruption ===
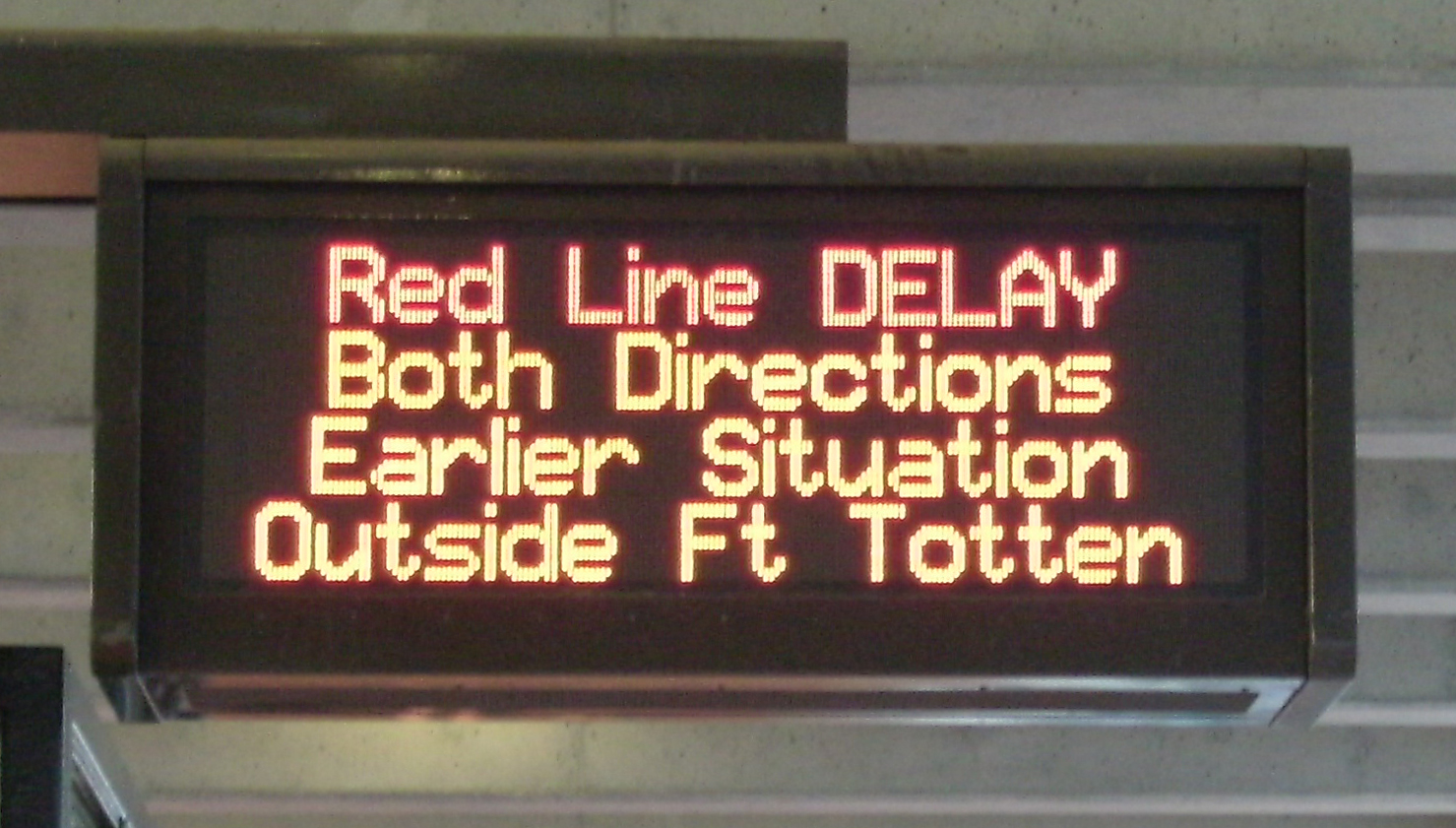
Delays continued on the Red Line the day after the collision, the "earlier situation" referred to on the Passenger Information Display System sign.

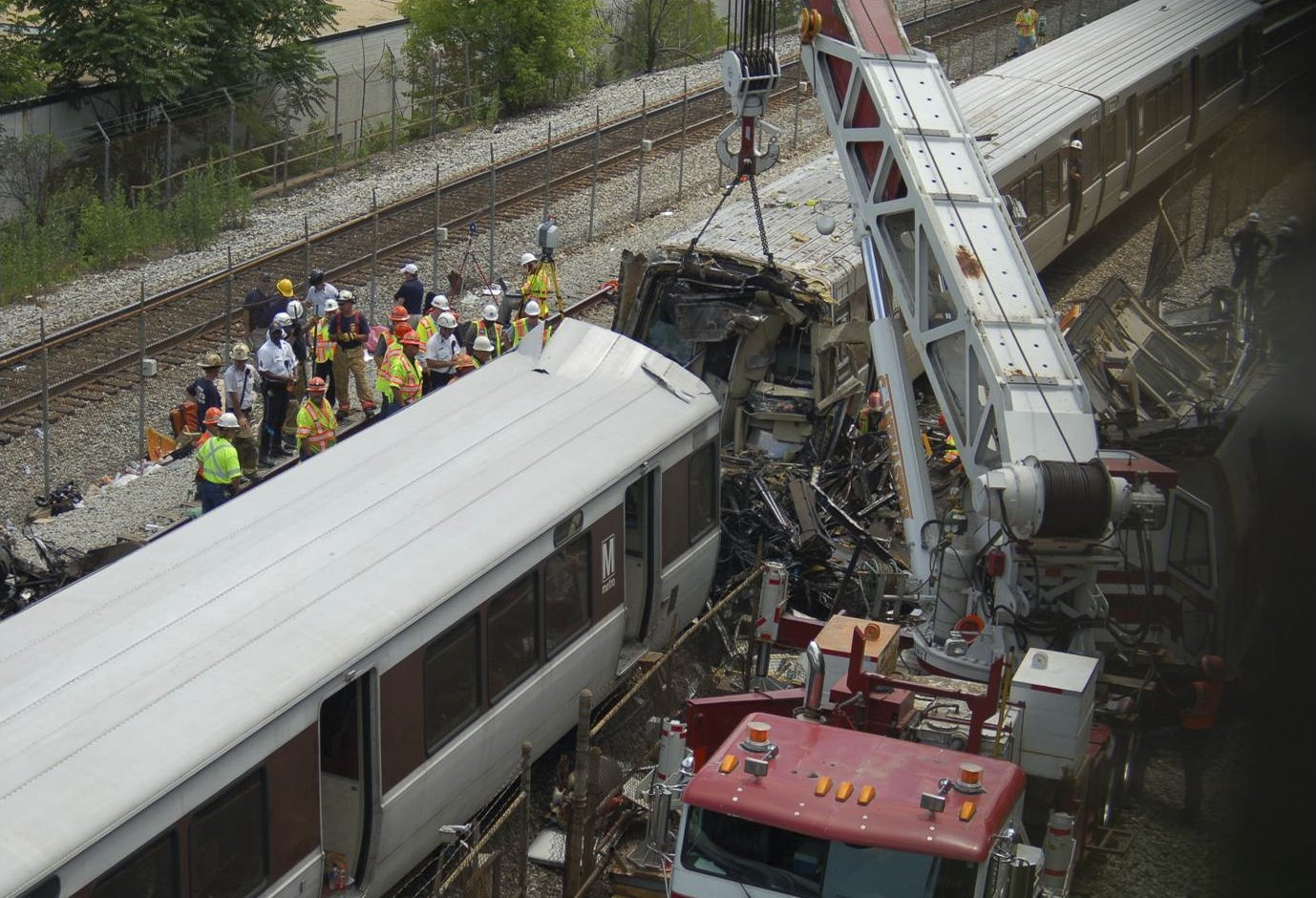
Clean up recovery of the wrecked cars following the collision. Red Line service was suspended between Fort Totten and Silver Spring until Saturday June 27.

Immediately following the incident, Red Line service was suspended between the Fort Totten and Takoma stations, and New Hampshire Avenue was closed, running in two sections between Silver Spring and Glenmont stations, and between Shady Grove and Rhode Island Avenue/Fort Totten stations pending the completion of the initial investigation and the clearing of debris. Service was temporarily increased on the 79 and S9 in response to the crash. Washington Mayor Adrian Fenty said that transportation "all along the East Coast will be significantly impacted," as Amtrak and MARC Trains run on tracks adjacent to the crash site. Shuttle Bus service was deployed to route Metrorail passengers around the closed track, but area commuting was severely affected. The federal government urged its employees in the Washington metropolitan area to remote work on June 23 if possible. The Red Line was projected to be very crowded after resumption of service and the Washington Metropolitan Area Transit Authority (WMATA) advised people to take alternate bus routes. The replacement bus shuttle between the affected stations was expected to be subjected to long delays. Service between Fort Totten and Silver Spring remained suspended until limited service between Fort Totten and Takoma stations resumed on June 25, with trains single-tracking on track 2 (towards Glenmont) from 5 to 10 a.m. and 3 to 10 p.m.

Services were restored in both directions by June 27, but with a reduced maximum speed of 35 mph (56 km/h) on the entire Red Line, and slower speeds in the area of the collision.

== Investigation ==
The NTSB found that Train 214 came to a stop entirely within the faulty circuit B2-304, making it effectively invisible to the automatic train control (ATC) system. Investigators discovered that on June 17, technicians ran maintenance on track circuits and replaced an impedance bond for circuit B2-304. The circuit became faulty as a result, often “bobbing” (intermittently losing detection), showing the computers that the circuit was either occupied or unoccupied, even if no train was present. Other trains had received speed commands of 0 when traveling through this circuit, but had enough forward momentum to make it to the next circuit and resume detection and receipt of speed commands from the ATC system. On the day of the collision, trains were congested and Train 214 was going slower than normal because it was being driven in manual mode by its operator, and it came to a stop while remaining on circuit B2-304, therefore making the train invisible to the computer. As a result, Train 112 behind it was given full speed (55 mph [89 km/h]) commands by the ATC to proceed on the track. The investigation found that the emergency brakes had been applied by the operator of Train 112 when Train 214 came into view three seconds before the collision, but the collision was already unavoidable at that point, which occurred with a speed of about 44 mph (71 km/h).

A series of near-collisions in 2005 in similar circumstances in the tunnel between Foggy Bottom and Rosslyn stations led to a new test procedure that would have identified the faulty circuit after installation. By 2009, however, Metro engineers were unaware of this incident or the tests developed to detect the failure condition.

== Aftermath ==
=== Initial inquiry ===
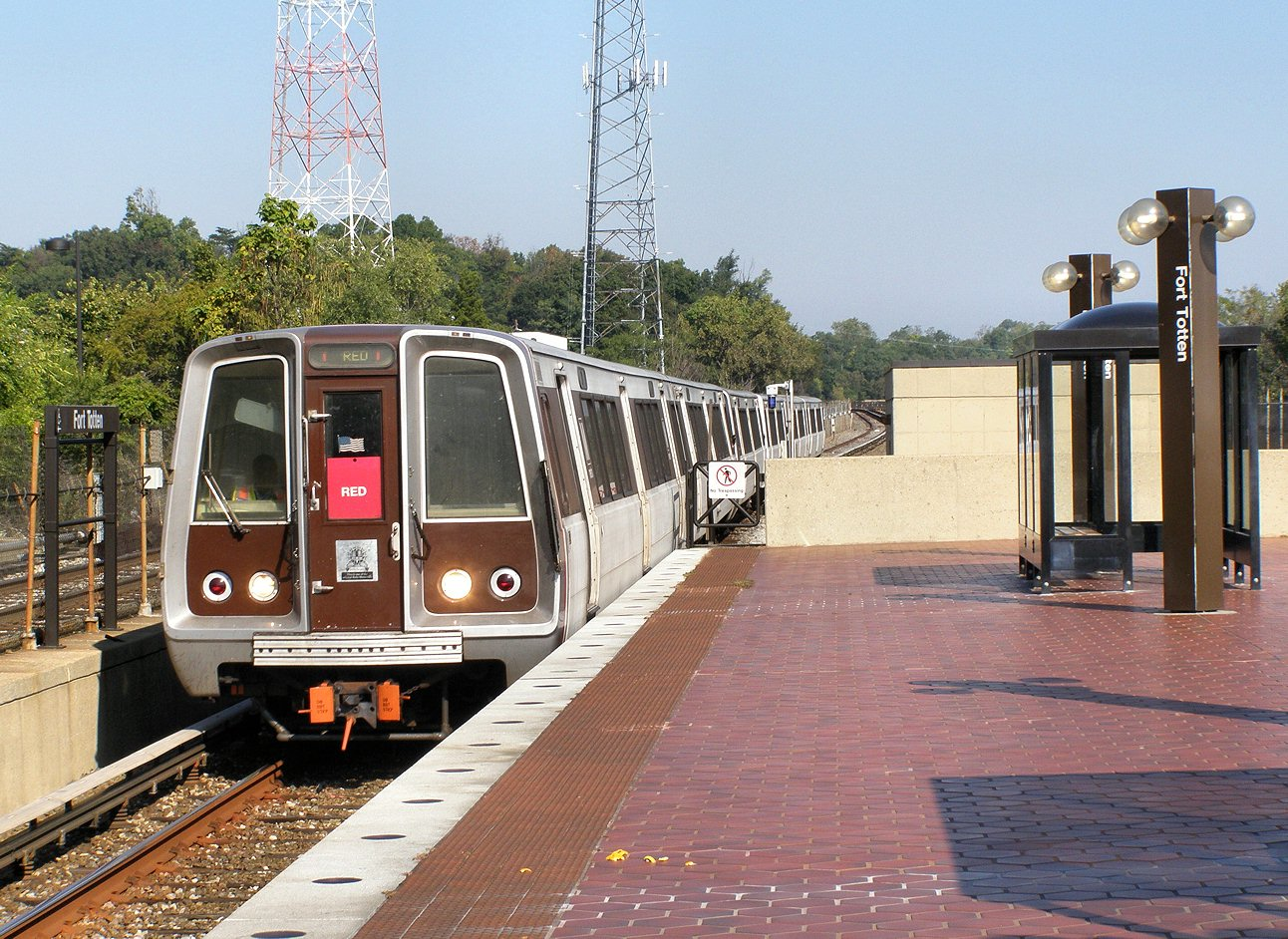
A typical 1000-Series trainset similar to the moving train in the crash arriving at Fort Totten

Shortly after the incident, WMATA General Manager John Catoe stated that the cause was not known but that "the system is safe." The National Transportation Safety Board (NTSB) began an investigation. WMATA and NTSB investigators considered several possible causes, which might include operator error, brake failure, fault in the computerized signal and operation system, or a combination of the three. During rush hour operation, train movement is typically controlled by a centralized computer system, and a separate decentralized system can automatically apply the brakes to prevent a collision. These systems had failed at least once in the past, and the NTSB subsequently identified incompatible specifications, from the maximum deceleration capability of the trains to the deceleration rates used in the wayside system design. The train has a manual emergency brake, which can be applied by the driver in the event of an imminent collision, if the driver can see and identify the hazard with sufficient time to stop. Officials indicated that the manual brake was indeed engaged. It is possible that the brake system failed to perform as designed, or that the operator applied the brake too late. The lead car of the moving train was two months overdue for scheduled brake maintenance. In a press conference the evening of June 22, Catoe stated that the last car on the stopped train was a CAF 5000-Series car (car 5066), which entered service in 2001, and that the lead car on the moving train was a Rohr Industries 1000-Series car. WMATA later confirmed that all of the cars on the moving train were 1000-Series.

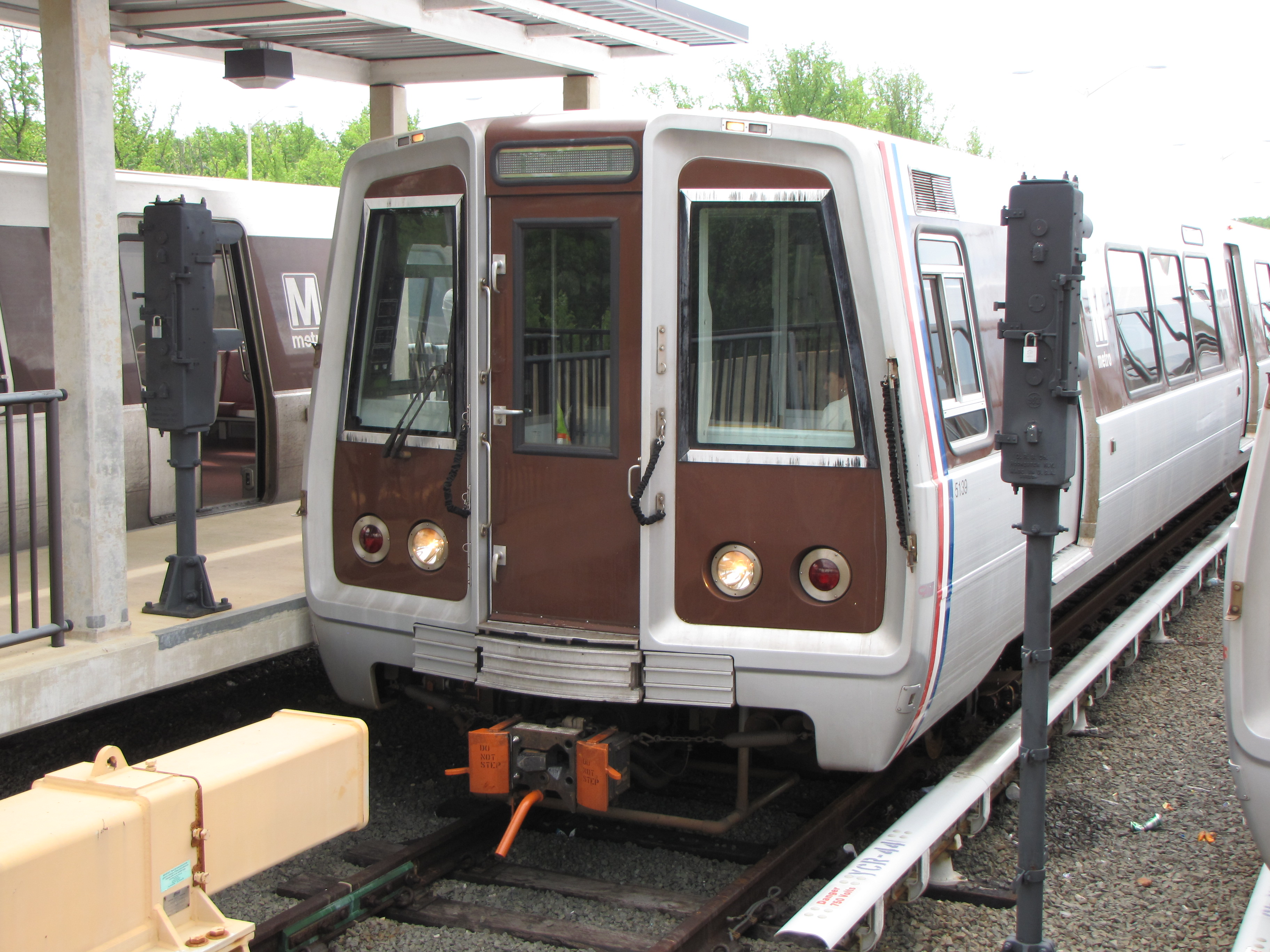
A typical 5000-Series car similar to the stopped train in the crash at the Branch Avenue Rail Yard

The 1000-Series entered service in 1976 when the Metro system opened, and were refurbished and had their motors converted from DC to AC propulsion by Breda Costruzioni Ferroviarie in the mid-1990s. In 2006, the NTSB cited the 1000-Series cars as "vulnerable to catastrophic telescoping damage and complete loss of occupant survival space in a longitudinal end-structure collision". It recommended refurbishment of the entire series after a 2004 collision at the Woodley Park station in which a 1000-Series Rohr car telescoped into another train. In this case, NTSB's Hersman confirmed that, "the first car [of the striking train] overrode the rear car [of the struck train], and much of the survivable space on that first car of the striking train was compromised". The NTSB called for the accelerated retirement of the 1000-Series cars, or urged that they be "retrofitted with crashworthiness collision protection that is comparable to 6000-Series car railcars." Additionally, the 1000-Series cars lack data recorders that could be used in determining the cause of a crash. During the press conference, Catoe stated that he had "no basis to suspend the use of 1000-Series cars at this time", but WMATA later announced a decision to stop using the 1000-Series cars as the lead or trailing units of any trains.

On June 24, WMATA issued a press release stating that the agency is "not likely to know the cause for several weeks or months as the investigation unfolds." Twenty-four hours after the incident, the NTSB confirmed that evidence indicated that the emergency brake had been engaged by the operator. Additionally, the striking train was in automatic mode and so the on-board software should have stopped the train.

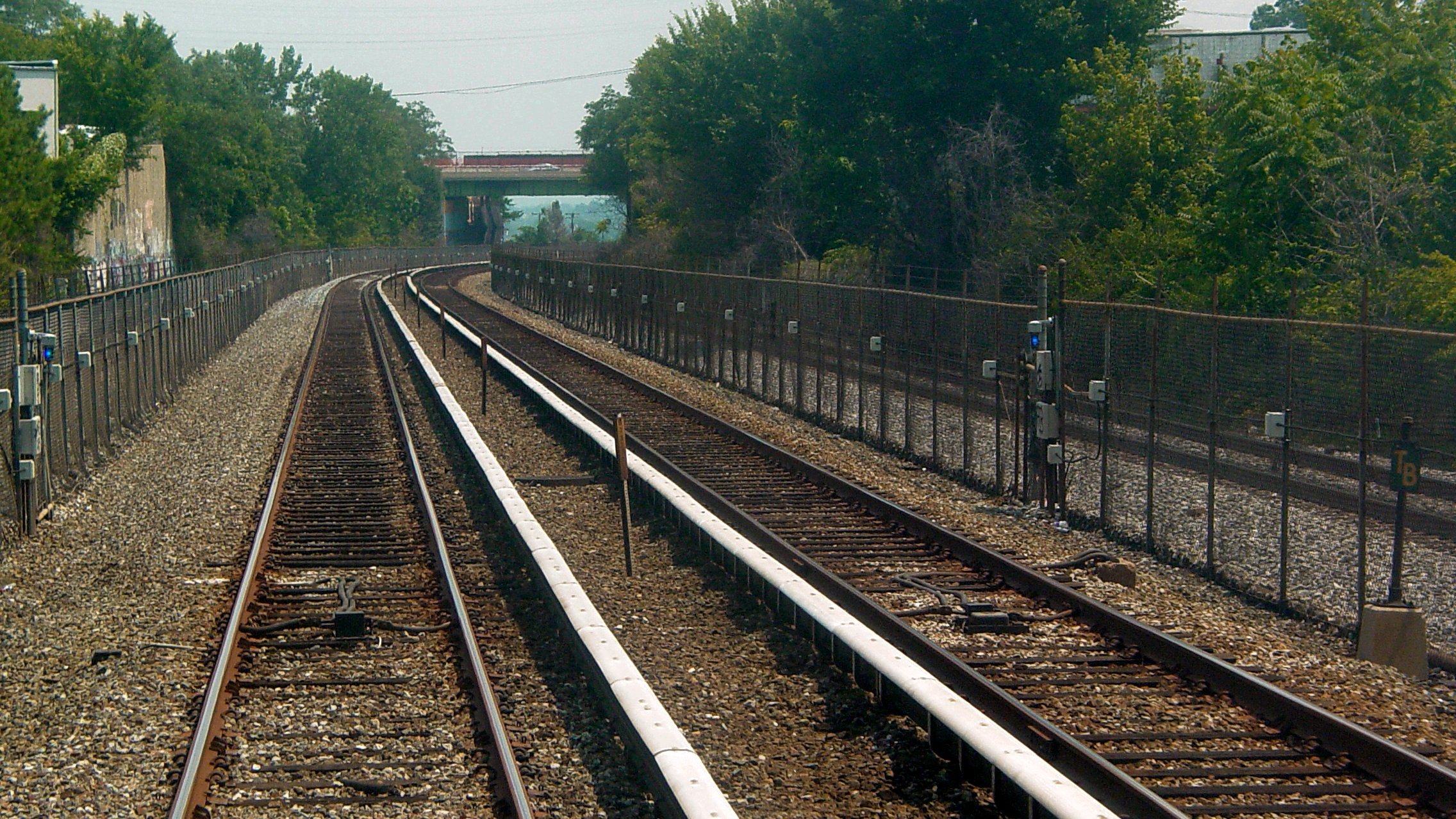
Inbound approach to collision site

On June 25, NTSB tests of the 740-foot (230 m) long track circuit below the stopped train showed that it did not work correctly, failing to detect the presence of a test train that investigators had placed on it. Hersman said, "These circuits are vital. It's a signal system. It's providing information, authorization and speed commands to the following train," but stopped short of blaming them in this case. WMATA had replaced all 20,000 track circuit relays system-wide in 1999, after a component designed to last 70 years began failing after only 25 years in service, but the agency claims that none of the newer relays had failed prior to this event. WMATA ordered the inspection of all track circuits on its 106 miles (171 km) of track after the NTSB test. On July 23, the NTSB announced that the track circuit at the crash site had been malfunctioning since 2007, 18 months prior to the collision, and WMATA has since found six other circuits within the system that have been behaving unusually. WMATA disabled each circuit that could not be immediately fixed and created an online circuit tracking system, similar to its elevator outage tracker.

=== NTSB report ===
The NTSB report on the crash was released on July 27, 2010, and blamed a faulty track circuit, part of the automatic train control system, for causing the crash. WMATA made a press release detailing changes on July 26 in anticipation of the release of the report.

=== WMATA ===
After the collision, WMATA announced a policy of no longer placing the 1000-series at the end of trainsets to prevent telescoping in a collision, as they were structurally the weakest cars. All 1000-series cars were then put in the middle of trainsets and served for another eight years until their retirement in June 2017.

WMATA suspended Automatic Train Control indefinitely systemwide following the collision, with all trains now being operated manually. Automatic Train Control would resume on the Red Line on December 15, 2024, Green and Yellow lines on May 23, 2025, and on the Blue, Orange, and Silver lines on June 15, 2025, 15–16 years after the collision.

Car 1079 was destroyed in the accident and was scrapped on site, with its remains being brought to the Brentwood Shops. Car 1078 and cars 5066-5067 were also retired as a result of the accident. Despite being relatively undamaged, cars 1070–1071, 1130–1131, 3036–3037, and 3256-3257 also were retired following the accident. 1070-1071 and 1130-1131 were sent to the Guardian Centers facility in Georgia, while 3036-3037 and 3256-3257 were likely scrapped.

== Memorials ==
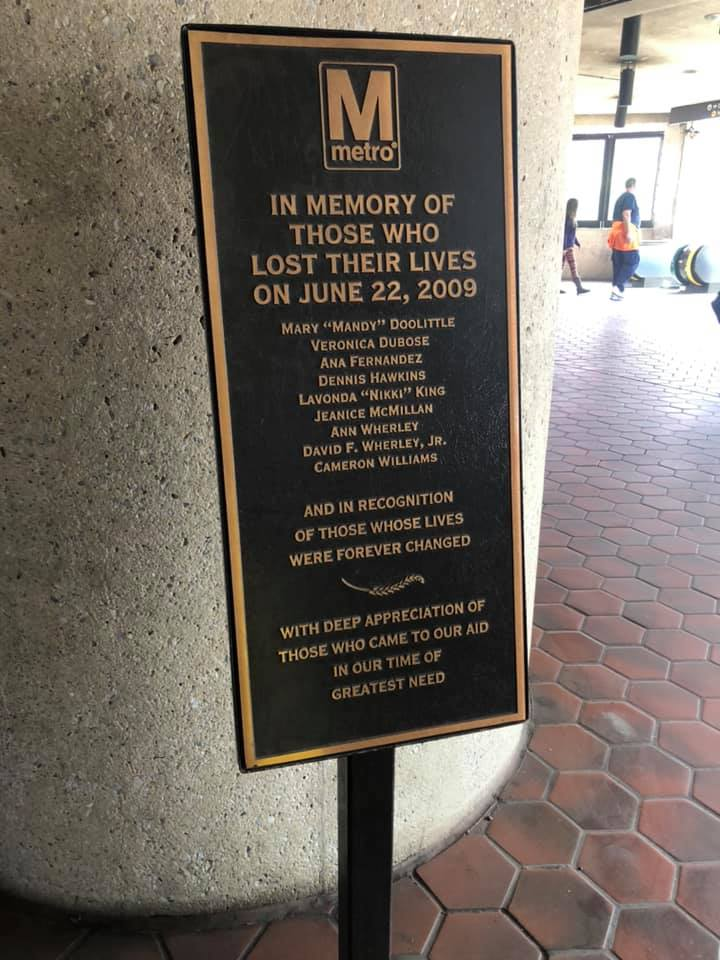
A plaque that commemorates the victims of the collision at Fort Totten station

A plaque is located in Fort Totten's mezzanine that commemorates the victims of the crash.

On the third anniversary of the crash, NTSB chairwoman Deborah Hersman and Mayor Gray attended the unveiling of a plaque on the Charles A. Langley Bridge. The bridge crosses the rail tracks at the site of the crash, and a makeshift memorial had been maintained there by victims' families.

On June 22, 2015, the sixth anniversary of the crash, the Legacy Memorial Park in honor of the victims was opened; ground was broken exactly one year previously by Mayor Vincent C. Gray. The park features a memorial wall and nine inscribed sculptures, one in honor of each person who died in the crash. The sculptures were created by sculptor Barbara Liotta, and the memorial was designed by the firm of Hunt Laudi; the design is titled A Sacred Grove. Representatives of victims' families and city government officials attended the dedication, but Metro officials did not. The park is located at the entrance to Blair Memorial Gardens, which is close to the site of the collision.

The same week as the memorial dedication, the National Transportation Safety Board held hearings related to another fatal incident in the Metro system that happened earlier in 2015; the juxtaposition of the two events was noted by some commentators.

== See also ==
- Incidents on the Washington Metro
- Wrong-side failure
