= Incidents on the Washington Metro =

Collisions, derailments, and other accidents involving the WMATA transit service

There have been numerous incidents on the Washington Metro over its history, including several collisions causing injuries and fatalities, and numerous derailments. The Washington Metropolitan Area Transit Authority (WMATA) has been criticized for disregarding safety warnings and advice from experts.

== Collisions ==
=== January 6, 1996 ===
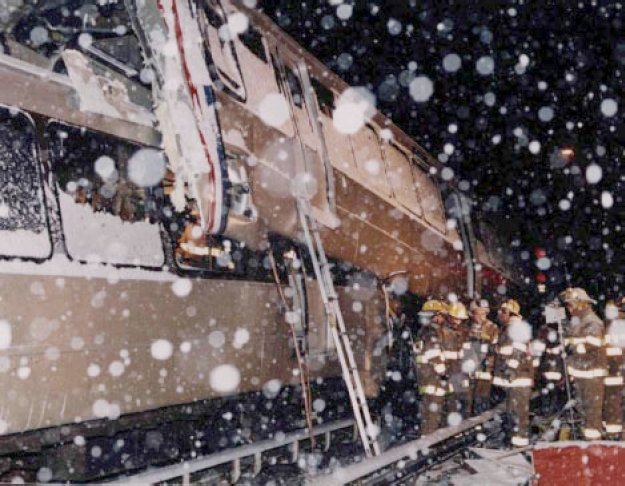
Final train positions in the January 6, 1996, accident at the Shady Grove station.

On January 6, 1996, during the Blizzard of 1996, a Metro operator was killed when Train 111 consisting of 3000-series railcars failed to come to a stop at the Shady Grove station. The four-car train overran the station platform and struck an unoccupied train also consisting of 3000-series railcars at the end of Shady Grove station. The National Transportation Safety Board (NTSB) investigation found that the crash was a result of a failure in the train's computer-controlled braking system. The NTSB recommended that Metro grant train operators the ability to manually control the braking system, even in inclement weather. Additionally, investigators recommended that Metro prohibit parked railcars on tracks used by inbound trains. The NTSB also recommended that Metro reinforce the 1000-series cars to help protect them against telescoping in a crash. Metro rejected this recommendation in 2002, saying the modification was impractical and might lead to "higher longitudinal accelerations" and thus greater injuries. The NTSB also advised Metro to install event recorders, similar to airplane black boxes, on all 1000-series cars. This recommendation echoed one made following Metrorail's first fatal accident in 1982, when the NTSB recommended the installation of event recorders in trains, but despite some discussion by WMATA managers, no recorders had been installed by January 1996. Train 111 consisted of railcars 3252, 3253, 3192 and 3193. The gap train consisted of railcars 3190, 3191, 3120, 3121, 3164, and 3165. 3252 and 3191 were destroyed in the collision with both cars being retained by WMATA for training purposes at Carmen Turner Facility in Landover, Maryland until 2023. The remaining cars involved in the collision were repaired. 3253 and 3190 were later mated together and renumbered to 3290 (3190) and 3291 (3253).

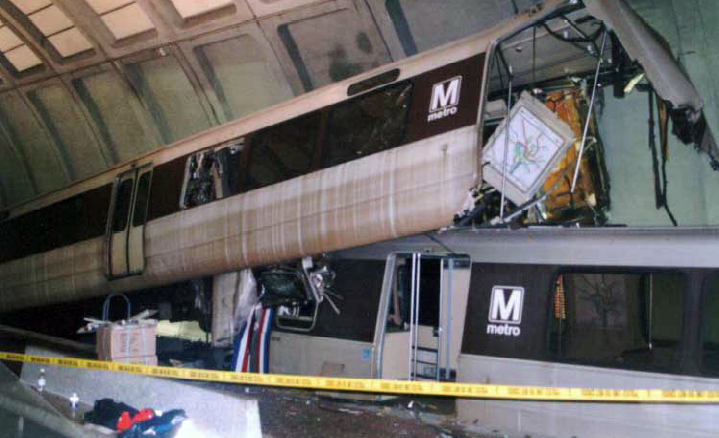
The November 3, 2004, accident at the Woodley Park station.

=== November 3, 2004 ===
On November 3, 2004, Train 703, an out-of-service train consisting of 1000-series railcars rolled backwards into the Woodley Park station and hit Train 105, an in-service Red Line train consisting of 4000-series railcars that was at the platform servicing the station. No one was killed, but 20 people were injured. A 14-month investigation concluded that the train operator was most likely not alert as the train rolled backwards into the station, and failed to apply the brakes while the train was holding. Safety officials estimated that had the out-of-service train been full, at least 79 would have died. The train operator was dismissed and Metro officials agreed to add rollback protection to more than 300 railcars. Train 703 consisted of railcars 1128, 1129, 1064, 1065, 1076, and 1077. Train 105 consisted of railcars 4018, 4019, 4017, 4016, 4092, and 4093. Car 1077 telescoped car 4018 and was destroyed in the collision. 1076 was also retired while 4018 was later repaired and returned to service.

=== June 22, 2009 ===
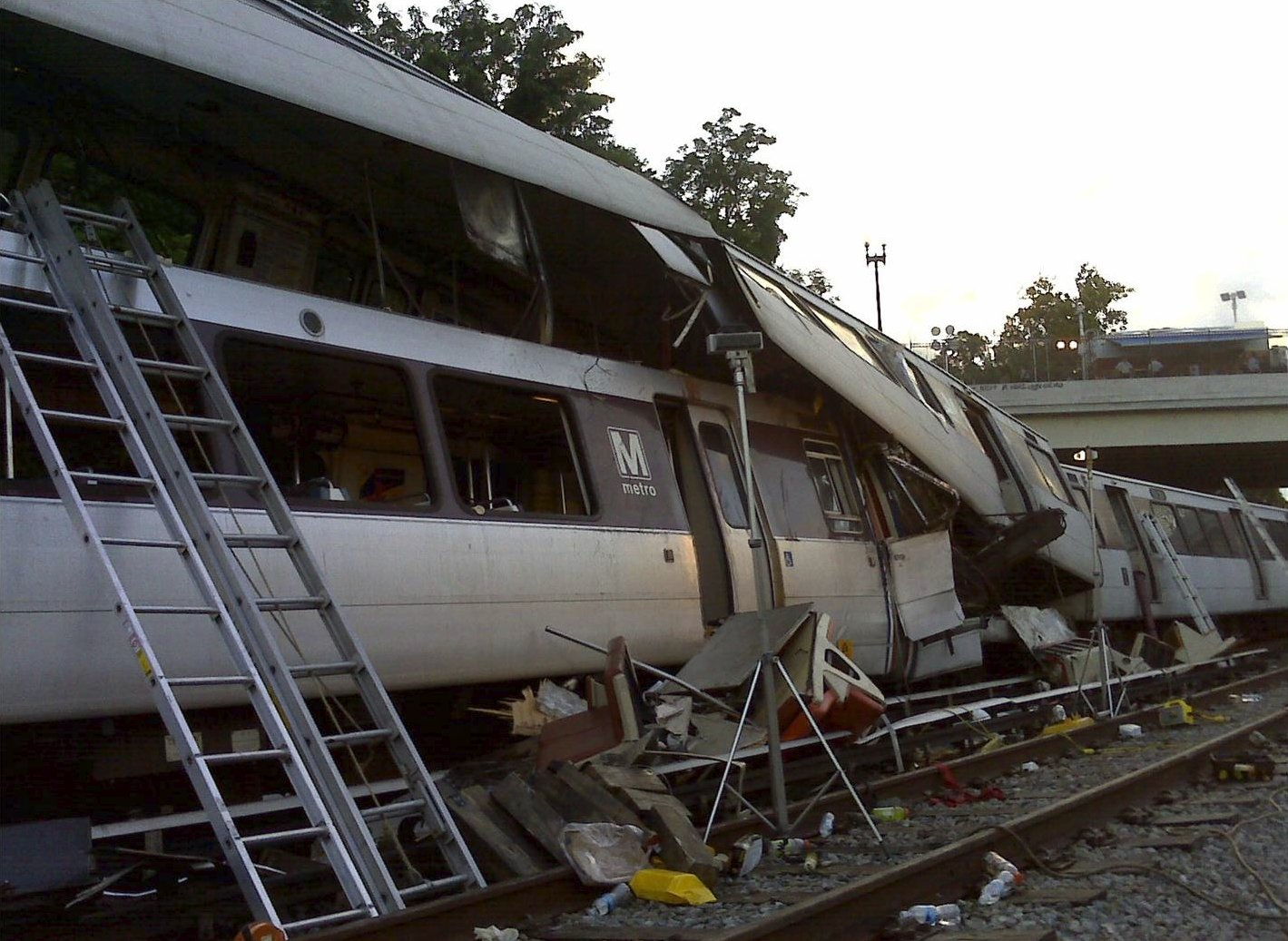
The June 22, 2009, accident on Metro's Red Line. Nine people were killed and over 70 people were injured.

On June 22, 2009, at 5:02 pm EDT, two trains on the Red Line collided. A southbound train bound for Shady Grove stopped on the track short of the Fort Totten station, and another southbound train collided with the rear of the first train. The lead car of the moving train telescoped into the rear car of the stationary one. Several surviving and deceased passengers were trapped for hours during the rescue operation. Nine people died and more than 70 were injured, dozens of which were described as "walking wounded". The moving train's operator was killed. According to WMATA, trains were not single-tracking in the area when the crash occurred, but the trains were on the same track. Red Line service was suspended between the Fort Totten and Takoma stations, and New Hampshire Avenue was closed.

=== November 29, 2009 ===
At 4:27 am on November 29, 2009, a collision occurred between two out-of-service trains at the Falls Church rail yard in Fairfax County, Virginia. According to Metro, three railcars were believed to be damaged beyond repair. Three Metro employees with minor injuries were taken to a local hospital. The NTSB planned to launch an investigation of the incident.

The train operator, whose name was not released, was fired for "failure to follow standard operating procedures." He had been a WMATA employee since 2007. His train was moving at 18 mph; the speed limit for train yards is 15 mph, and operators are supposed to reduce their speed even further when approaching parked trains.

All twelve railcars on the trains were damaged in the crash, and two were derailed, causing at least $9 million in damages. Train 902 (the moving train) was made up of cars 5056, 5057, 1171, 1170, 3223 and 3222. The stationary train was made up of cars 5138, 5139, 1107, 1106, 3216 and 3217. Cars 1106, 1107, 1170, 1171, 3216, and 3217 were damaged beyond repair.

=== October 7, 2019 ===
At 12:48 am on October 7, 2019, two out-of-service trains, both consisting of 3000-series railcars, collided between Foggy Bottom and Farragut West as both trains were being moved to their respective rail yards affecting the Blue, Orange, and Silver Lines during the morning rush. Two train operators were injured due to the collision. Train 755 (the stationary train) consisted of cars 3141, 3140, 3121, 3120, 3206 and 3207. Train 700 (the striking train) consisted of cars 3008, 3009, 3010, 3011, 3019 and 3018. Car 3008, the lead car of the striking train, struck car 3207 from the stationary train. Both cars suffered damage as of a result. Cars 3140 and 3120 also suffered broken couplers during the collision. Cars 3008, 3009, 3120, 3121, 3206, and 3207 were damaged beyond repair as a result of the accident.

The cause of the collision was a result of the operator from Train 700 repeatedly accelerating the train despite receiving a “zero speed command,” and not having permission to do so by the Metro’s Rail Operations Control Center. The operator of train 700 had a history of violations including being suspended between 2006 and 2010 from operating trains, being involved in a 2013 derailment, and failing to report a station overrun in 2015, and was subsequently fired following the collision.

=== April 22, 2026 ===
On April 22, 2026 shortly after midnight, a work train (Prime Mover 64, PM64) traveling from Alexandria Rail Yard to New Carrollton Rail Yard collided with car 7698 on a stationary Silver Line train at Metro Center station, injuring 11 passengers. The resulting collision caused service disruptions on the Blue, Orange, and Silver lines the following morning.

== Track worker accidents ==
Metro had a string of three fatal accidents involving track workers in a little over a year. In October 2005, a Metro employee was struck and killed at the Braddock Road station on the Blue and Yellow Lines. In May 2006, another Metro employee died after being hit by a Red Line train at Dupont Circle station. On November 30, 2006, two Metro employees were struck and killed by a Metrorail train while performing routine track maintenance on the Yellow Line near Eisenhower Avenue station. The operator of the train was found to be at fault for not following appropriate emergency braking procedures, and was permanently barred from operating Metro trains or buses. WMATA subsequently limited when track inspections can take place and lowered train speeds to 20 miles per hour (32 km/h) when within 600 feet (180 m) of inspectors.

On August 9, 2009, Metro employee Michael Nash was struck and killed by a ballast regulator, a track unit that deposits and spreads track ballast onto the track bed. The incident occurred halfway between the Dunn Loring and Vienna stations on the western end of the Orange Line in Fairfax County.

On September 10, 2009, Metro employee John Moore was struck between the Braddock Road and Ronald Reagan Washington National Airport stations. He was taken to a local hospital, where he died four days later from his injuries.

On January 26, 2010, two Metro employees Jeff Garrard, 49 and Sung Oh, 68 were found dead when they were hit by a piece of track equipment at the Rockville station. They were installing new train control equipment in the track bed on the outbound track of the Red Line, towards Shady Grove.

On October 6, 2013, two Washington Metro employees were injured and a contractor, Harold Ingram, was killed when they were struck by a 40-foot (12 m) section of rail following a fire and loud noise approximately 70 to 80 feet (21 to 24 meters) from the injured workers. The incident occurred shortly after midnight in a work zone on the outbound (Glenmont direction) track approximately 400 feet (120 m) from the Union Station platform towards Judiciary Square.

== Derailments ==
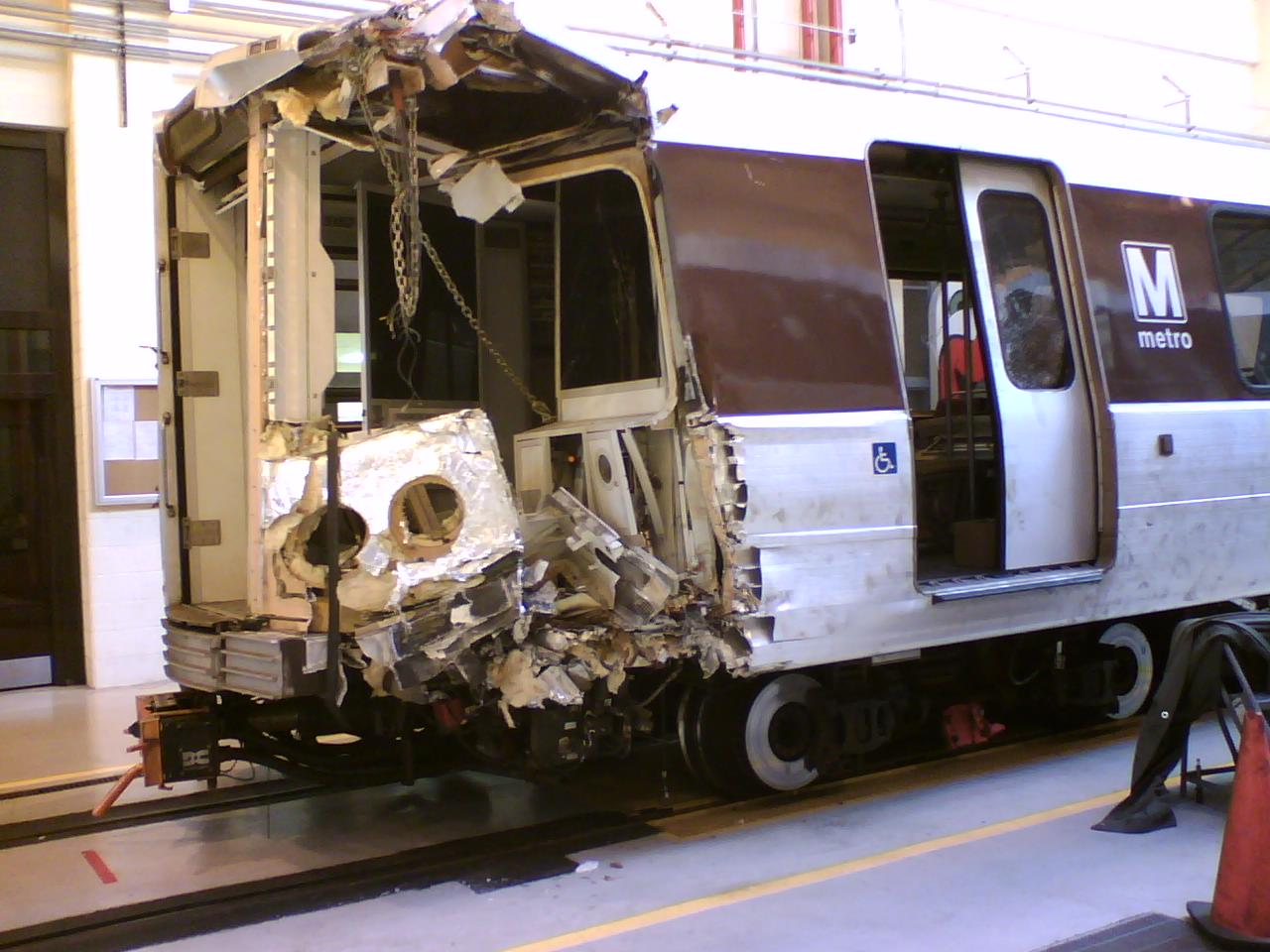
Green Line train following the January 7, 2007, derailment, seen at Greenbelt Yard

- On January 13, 1982, a train derailed at a malfunctioning crossover switch south of the Federal Triangle station. In their attempt to restore the train to the rails, supervisors failed to notice that another car had also derailed. That car slid off the track and hit a tunnel support, killing three people and injuring 25. This accident occurred just thirty minutes after the crash of Air Florida Flight 90 into the 14th Street Bridge.
- In January 2003, a Blue Line train carrying 46 passengers derailed at the National Airport station. This incident was followed by a string of seven other derailments in the following 20 months, some of which occurred in rail yards or yard lead track.
- A 5000-series train derailed on August 19, 2004, just north of the Silver Spring station on a section of pocket track used for turning Red Line trains around when they terminate at the station.
- On January 7, 2007, the fifth car of a Greenbelt bound Green Line train derailed and hit a retaining wall near the Mount Vernon Square station in downtown Washington. At the time, trains were single tracking, and the derailment of the train's fifth car occurred where the train was switching from the south to northbound track. The train was carrying approximately 120 people and the accident injured at least 18 people and prompted the rescue of 60 people from a tunnel. At least one person had a serious but non-life-threatening injury. The Mount Vernon Square accident was one of a series of five derailments involving Metrorail's 5000-Series cars, up to that point, with four of those occurring on side tracks and not involving passengers. The cars involved in the derailment (5152-5153) were damaged beyond repair and were retired as a result of the accident despite proposals to repair both railcars.
- On June 9, 2008, an Orange Line train (2000-series) derailed between the Rosslyn and Court House stations. Prior to this incident, the tracks were improperly inspected and problems with the tracks were not reported.
- On March 27, 2009, a Red Line train derailed near the Bethesda station, after it was experiencing mechanical difficulties and passengers had been offloaded. The first car of the second train, sent to recover the disabled train, also derailed.
- On February 19, 2009, a vacuum maintenance vehicle derailed along the K Route near the Court House station, and derailed again the same day when it was being taken to a rail yard. The same day, a Yellow Line train with 5000-Series cars derailed near Mount Vernon Square, but with no serious injuries, as the train had already offloaded passengers.
- On February 12, 2010, a Red Line train derailed after it left the Farragut North station near downtown Washington. In the derailment the front wheels of the first car were forced off the tracks, stopping the train. Almost all of the estimated 345 passengers were evacuated from the damaged train by 11:50 am The evacuation was completed by moving passengers into the third, fourth, fifth, and sixth cars of the consist, decoupling the cars from the lead pair, and then running the remaining four cars back to Farragut North station. The lead pair was left in the tunnel. Two minor injuries were reported, and a third passenger was taken to George Washington University Hospital. The NTSB arrived on the scene by 12:00 pm. The NTSB determined that after leaving the station, the train entered a pocket track due to an improper configuration of train identification and destination codes caused by improper management of the train operator by WMATA. The operator, who was newly returned to service from an extended leave, mistakenly believed she was told to run past the red signal. As it continued, an automatic derailer at the end of the pocket track intentionally derailed the train as a safety measure.
- On April 24, 2012, around 7:15 pm, a Blue Line train bound for Franconia–Springfield derailed near Rosslyn. No injuries were reported.
- On July 6, 2012, a southbound Green Line train derailed in a tunnel in Hyattsville, Maryland. Three cars derailed, but remained upright, and none of the 55 passengers were injured. Heat is thought to have played a factor in the derailment, causing a kink in the rail.
- On August 30, 2013, just after midnight, a non-revenue Red Line train derailed while in transit between two rail yards. The incident occurred outbound on the Red Line between the Rhode Island Avenue–Brentwood and Brookland–CUA stations. There were no injuries. The incident caused a portion of the Red Line to be closed from Fort Totten to NoMa during the Friday pre-Labor Day morning rush hour. The derailment damaged several pieces of track equipment including the 3rd rail. It was reported that railcars 1090 and 1091, which were damaged in a previous incident at Silver Spring, were part of the derailed consist.
- On August 6, 2015, an unoccupied multi-car train derailed causing major delays during the morning rush hour and effectively closed three of the six metro lines. Several metro stations were also closed leading to emergency bus shuttles which caused further congestion as thousands of passengers, with little guidance or instruction from Metro employees, were evacuated from the East Falls Church and Metro Center stations.
- On July 29, 2016, a westbound Silver Line train derailed in an interlock zone outside of East Falls Church station during Safetrack. Two cars of the passenger-laden train were described as being 'heavily damaged', although only minor injuries have been reported. East Falls Church station was shut down causing major delays and crowds the entire day.
- On January 15, 2018, a Red Line train derailed between Farragut North and Metro Center stations, and involved the new 7000-series train cars. No injuries were reported. A broken rail was likely the cause of the accident.
- On July 7, 2020, around 11:20 am, the first two cars (car 7502 and 7503) of a Glenmont-bound Red Line train jumped the switch and derailed at Silver Spring station. None of the 32 passengers or operator on board were injured. According to reports, the train may have passed through a red signal and entered the pocket track where another train was idling on and the switch possibly aligned back to the main tracks. The first car (7502) entered the pocket track while the second car (7503) remained on the main track and derailed. The train was traveling at a low speed as the train derailed.
- On October 12, 2021, a westbound Blue Line train consisting of 7000-series cars derailed in the tunnel between Rosslyn and Arlington Cemetery causing service to be suspended between Rosslyn and Pentagon stations. No injuries were reported. Service was disrupted between Arlington Cemetery/Court House and Foggy Bottom stations until October 15, 2021. The incident also caused the entire fleet of 7000-series railcars to be pulled from service for inspection of the axle since October 17, 2021, causing severe service reductions. In a final report released in January 2023, one axle from the 4th car was found to be out of compliance with the specification of the wheel assembly by 2 inches (5.1 cm). The wheel migration occurred over time, possibly due to reduced interference between the axle and wheel.
- On September 29, 2023, a southbound Blue Line train derailed on an elevated track south of National Airport station. After an investigation, it was determined that the derailment was caused by a collision with a piece of debris that had fallen off the previous 3000-series train. There were no injuries reported.
- On July 4, 2026, at about 11:50 am, a six-car 3000-series train in the direction of Greenbelt derailed close to College Park–University of Maryland station. 11 passengers evacuated the train safely with one particular passenger being sent to the hospital. The cause of the incident was most likely a heat kink in the rail that was caused by overwhelmingly humid temperatures, which caused one of the cars, 3138, to come off the track and derail. Trains were forced to limit their speeds up to 35 mph, and Green and Yellow line trains were forced to single track shortly after that incident. The following day, train service was suspended between Hyattsville Crossing station and Greenbelt station with Yellow line trains only running up to Mount Vernon Square station or Fort Totten station in order to fix the broken rail.

== Other incidents ==
In 1987, a CSX train derailed near the Takoma station, where the freight trains and Metro tracks run along the same corridor. The CSX train tore through a chain-link fence and onto the Metro tracks. One car penetrated the Metro power substation building adjacent to the tracks, causing significant damage. This accident led NTSB to recommend an intrusion detection warning system along this stretch of tracks.

In 1989, an Orange Line train hit a car that had fallen onto the tracks from an Interstate 66 overpass, though the train operator was able to apply the emergency brakes and slow the train to 5 mph at impact, resulting in no serious injuries for the 40 passengers. In a similar incident on February 11, 2026, a car fell onto the Orange Line tracks near Dunn Loring station, this time from the westbound HOT lanes on I-66, temporarily suspending rail service between West Falls Church and Vienna and shutting down the westbound HOT lanes where the car fell from. No trains were involved in the incident.

On March 22, 2025, a piece of fencing fell from Washington Boulevard's overpass of I-66, disrupting Orange and Silver Line service between Ballston–MU and West Falls Church/McLean.

=== Train separations ===
- On January 6, 2016, two 3000 Series cars on the Green Line separated from each other while on approach to Navy Yard station causing delays.
- On December 12, 2016, two 7000 Series cars separated from each other while operating on the Red Line at Twinbrook station.
- On August 27, 2018, cars 6038 and 6039 separated from each other while operating on the Silver Line between McLean and East Falls Church station.
- On April 15, 2019, a non-revenue 3000 series train separated while it was being moved onto the Wiehle-Reston pocket tracks.
- On October 9, 2020, cars 6075 and 6079 on a northbound Red Line train separated from each other between NoMa and Union station causing service to be suspended between Gallery Place and Rhode Island Avenue stations. There were no injuries but at least 100 passengers were stranded on the train.
- On November 24, 2020, cars 6150 and 6177 on a southbound Red Line train pulled apart from each other while departing Glenmont station causing service to be suspended between Glenmont and Forrest Glen stations. There were no injuries. Immediately after the incident, Metro pulled all 6000-series railcars from service for a pending investigation.

=== Near-collisions ===
Metro has also experienced a number of incidents in which trains narrowly missed colliding. On June 7, 2005, a train operator in the tunnel beneath the Potomac River, between the Foggy Bottom–GWU and Rosslyn stations, had a signal to proceed but noticed red lights ahead and engaged the emergency brakes. His train missed colliding with the one ahead of it by 35 feet (11 m), and the train behind his missed colliding by 20 feet (6.1 m). Another incident occurred in March 2009, near the Potomac Avenue station, when one train missed colliding with another by 500 feet (150 m) after the Automatic Train Protection system failed.

=== Smoke incidents ===
==== January 12, 2015 ====
On January 12, 2015, during early evening rush, a Yellow Line train departing L'Enfant Plaza for Pentagon began to fill with smoke. Everyone on board was evacuated; 84 people were taken to hospitals and one person died. The National Transportation Safety Board released a statement saying "an electrical arcing event" sparked the incident. According to an Associated Press story the next day, the last fatality on the metro system had been on June 22, 2009. The report went on to state that electricity had arced from the third rail to the track, and that the cause was still undetermined. One victim was known to be in critical condition. Questions were raised about the timeliness and adequacy of the emergency response by Metro and rescue personnel.

==== December 10, 2019 ====
On December 10, 2019, smoke was reported from an arcing insulator along the Red Line near Tenleytown–AU station, causing service to be suspended between Friendship Heights and Van Ness–UDC stations during the morning rush hour. A train was stuck in the smoke inside the tunnel at Tenleytown. Later in the afternoon rush hour, more smoke was reported from an arcing insulator at Woodley Park station causing service to be suspended between Dupont Circle and Van Ness. Red Line trains were then forced to operate on a single track between Friendship Heights and Van Ness due to another arcing insulator failure. This led to WMATA replacing 36 arcing insulators the next day.

==== February 4, 2020 ====
On February 4, 2020, smoke was reported at L'Enfant Plaza when maintenance crew attempted to remove a padlock from an employee locker in a mechanical room at L'Enfant Plaza by using an unauthorized tool. The crew extinguished the fire but operators on trains that were carrying passengers were told to do a track inspection of the vicinity before the smoke can clear out. WMATA took criticism from the smoke incident.

=== "Lost Child" emergency pull ===
On July 21, 2015, a man at the L'Enfant Plaza station pulled an emergency stop lever after apparently missing his stop. The man was captured on closed circuit television forcing open the doors of the stopped train and running down the platform with a young child in hand. In accordance with Metro procedures, the entire line on which the train had stopped was secured with teams dispatched to review the situation. The action caused extensive delays and led to outrage among Metro passengers. Several days later, Metro Transit Police reported that the man had stopped the train after being separated from a second younger child on the train platform. The man was questioned by police and no charges were filed.

=== Structural incidents ===
On September 1, 2016, the Rhode Island Avenue station was shut down due to falling debris. After two incidents of concrete chunks and metal falling from the mezzanine ceiling, Metro announced the temporary closure of the station pending emergency investigation.

=== Summary of incidents ===
Date of incident	Location	Type	Cause	Casualties	Notes
1/13/1982	Federal Triangle	Derailment	Switch malfunction	3 dead, 25 injured	First major incident in Metro's history, took place 30 minutes after the crash of Air Florida Flight 90.
1/6/1996	Shady Grove	Collision	ATC malfunction	1 dead	
Jan 2003	National Airport	Derailment	Unknown	Unknown	
8/19/2004	Silver Spring	Derailment	Unknown	Unknown	
11/3/2004	Woodley Park	Collision	Unintended roll-back	20 injured	
1/7/2007	Mount Vernon Square	Derailment	Unknown	18 injured	
6/9/2008	Rosslyn/Court House	Derailment	Neglected maintenance work	Unknown	
2/9/2009	Court House	Derailment (work vehicle)	Unknown	Unknown	
2/9/2009	Unknown	Derailment (work vehicle)	Unknown	Unknown	
2/9/2009	Mount Vernon Square	Derailment	Unknown	None	
6/22/2009	Fort Totten/Takoma	Collision	ATC malfunction	9 dead, 70+ injured	Deadliest Accident in the system's history
11/29/2009	Falls Church Yard	Collision	Operator error	Unknown	
2/12/2010	Farragut North	Derailment	Improper train management	3 injured	
4/24/2012	Rosslyn	Derailment	Unknown	None	
7/6/2012	Hyattsville	Derailment	Rail kink caused by heat	None	
8/30/2013	Brentwood	Derailment	Unknown	None	
8/6/2015	Multiple locations	Derailment	Unknown	Unknown	
1/6/2016	Navy Yard	Railcar separation	Unknown	None	
7/29/2016	East Falls Church	Derailment	Unknown	Minor injuries	
12/12/2016	Twinbrook	Railcar separation	Unknown	None	
1/15/2018	Farragut North/Metro Center	Derailment	Broken rail	None	
8/27/2018	McLean/East Falls Church	Railcar separation	Unknown	None	
4/15/2019	Wiehle-Reston East	Railcar separation	Unknown	None	
10/7/2019	Foggy Bottom/Farragut West	Collision	Operator error	None	
7/7/2020	Silver Spring	Derailment	Red signal violation	None	
10/9/2020	NoMa/Union Station	Railcar separation	Incorrect coupler tools	None	6000 Series temporarily removed from service following the second separation.
11/24/2020	Glenmont	Railcar separation	Incorrect coupler tools	None	6000 Series temporarily removed from service following the second separation.
10/12/2021	Rosslyn	Derailment	Wheel migration	None	7000 Series temporarily removed railcars from service following the derailment.
9/29/2023	National Airport	Derailment	Collision with debris	None	
4/22/2026	Metro Center	Collision with work vehicle	Unknown	Minor injuries	
7/4/2026	College Park	Derailment	Heat Kink	Unknown	

== Oversight ==
The Tri-State Oversight Committee formerly oversaw WMATA, but had no regulatory authority. Metro's safety department usually was in charge of investigating incidents, but could not require other Metro agencies to implement its recommendations. In October 2015, following several safety lapses, the Federal Transit Administration assumed oversight of WMATA with the authority to conduct inspections and impose sanctions. The NTSB, which is charged with investigating every civil aviation accident and significant accidents in other modes of transportation, does not have the authority to set or enforce standards. This lack of authority has been scrutinized after NTSB recommended that WMATA take measures to increase crash worthiness of trains after collisions in 1996 and again in 2006. WMATA did not take action on these recommendations, citing tax advantage leases and an eventual replacement around 2014. NTSB, unable to compel action, classified the recommendation as, "Safety Recommendation R-06-2 Closed Unacceptable Action".
