= Greenbelt–BWI Thurgood Marshall Airport Express Line =

B30
- Greenbelt–BWI Thurgood Marshall Airport Line

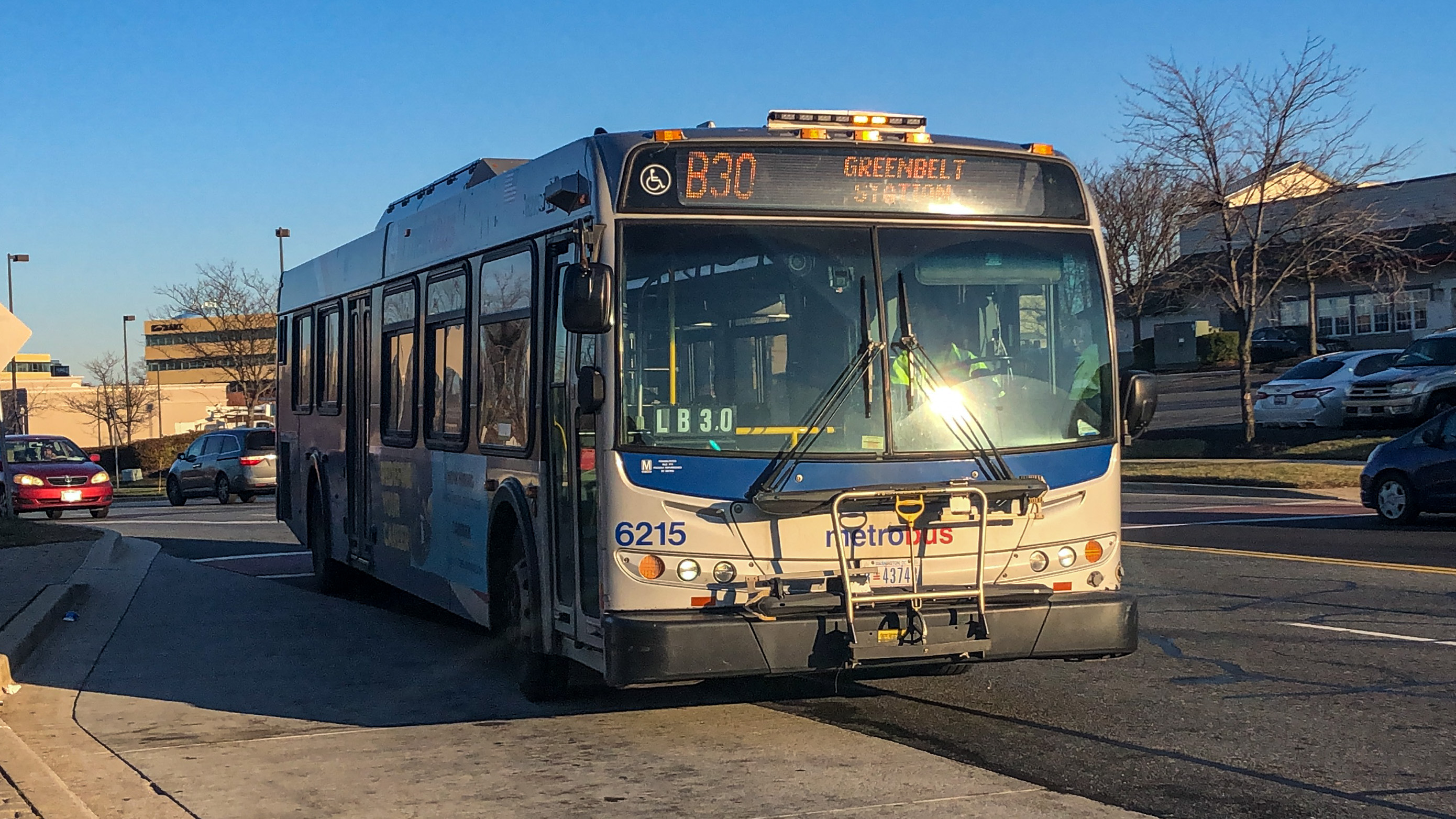
- Route B30 at Arundel Mills Mall

Overview
- System: Metrobus
- Operator: Washington Metropolitan Area Transit Authority
- Garage: Landover
- Status: Discontinued
- Began service: 2001
- Ended service: 2020

Route
- Locale: Prince George's County; Anne Arundel County
- Communities served: Greenbelt
- Landmarks served: BWI Business District station BWI Airport Arundel Mills Mall
- Start: Greenbelt station
- Via: Baltimore-Washington Parkway
- End: BWI Marshall Airport
- Length: Northbound: 30.7 miles (49.41 km)

Service
- Level: Daily
- Frequency: 70 minutes
- Weekend frequency: No Service
- Operates: 6:00 AM – 10:45 PM (weekdays)
- Transfers: SmarTrip only
- Timetable: Greenbelt-BWI Thurgood Marshall Airport Express Line

The Greenbelt–BWI Thurgood Marshall Airport Express Line (commonly shortened to the Greenbelt–BWI Airport Line), designated Route B30, was a weekday-only bus route operated by the Washington Metropolitan Area Transit Authority between Baltimore-Washington International Thurgood Marshall Airport and the Greenbelt station of the Green and Yellow Lines of the Washington Metro. When it last ran, the line operated every 70 minutes five days a week along the Baltimore–Washington Parkway between these two locations with no intermediate stops, with the exception of the BWI Business District Light Rail Stop and Arundel Mills Mall, and the last bus leaving BWI at 10:09 pm. The trip was approximately 50 minutes long.

== Service ==
Service operated every 70 minutes between Greenbelt station and Baltimore-Washington International Thurgood Marshall Airport on weekdays only. WMATA used 6 2006 New Flyer D40LFRs numbered 6212–6217 to operate on the route based out of Landover Division. However, other buses could be used on the route if the D40LFRs were running on other routes or undergoing maintenance. The original vehicles used were now retired 1997 Orion Vs numbered 4390–4395. Each bus had suburban seating with overhead luggage racks with a larger luggage rack in the middle of the bus.

=== Stops ===
Bus stop	Direction	Connections
Greenbelt, Maryland
Greenbelt Station Bus Bay D	Southbound Terminal, Northbound station	Metrobus: 87, 89, 89M, C2, G12, G14, R12; RTA: 302/G; TheBus: 11, 15, 16; Shuttle-UM: 129; BoltBus; Washington Metro: MARC: Camden Line
Greenbelt Metro Drive / Cherrywood Lane	Bidirectional	Metrobus: 87, 89, 89M, C2, G12, G14, R12
Baltimore–Washington Parkway
Hanover, Maryland
Arundel Mills Mall	Bidirectional	MTA Maryland: 75, 201; RTA: 201, 202, 501, 502
Baltimore–Washington Parkway
Baltimore, Maryland
BWI Rail station	Bidirectional	MARC: Penn Line; Amtrak
BWI Business District station	Bidirectional	Baltimore Light RailLink
Baltimore–Washington International Thurgood Marshall Airport	Northbound Terminal, Southbound station	Baltimore Light RailLink

== Background ==
Service began on November 16, 2001, to connect service to BWI Airport from Prince George's County.

The line is unique for being the only WMATA bus line that has a connection with any Maryland Transit Administration non-commuter services, and is responsible for providing a regular link between the two services. The original $3 one-way fare was seen as a bargain compared with other transportation modes in the area, including Greyhound and MARC Train Service.

In 2007, it was reported that the B30 line was partly responsible for BWI Airport ranking as one of the nation's top 10 airports in ease of access. WMATA also provides higher levels of service on the line in special times of need, especially on certain holidays.

The state of Maryland, which provides funds for operating the service, has been criticized for doing little to promote its use.

Between 2016 and 2017, WMATA proposed to eliminate the B30 route completely due to the route under-performing under WMATA standards.

On June 25, 2017, weekend service for the B30 was discontinued and the one-way fare for the route was increased to $7.50 making the B30 bus a more expensive option than the MARC train. Buses also increase head-ways from 40 to 60 minutes.

Later during WMATA's FY2019 proposed budget, WMATA proposed to reroute the B30 to serve Arundel Mills via Arundel Mills Boulevard beginning in June 2018. WMATA also proposed to add service along Baltimore Avenue between Sunnyside Avenue and Fort Meade Road, serving select limited stops beginning in June 2018. These proposals were meant to provide brand-new services to other markets and improve connections to the Maryland Transit Administration and Regional Transportation Agency of Central Maryland in Greenbelt and the Airport, establishing Metrobus service to Arundel Mills, increase ridership, and would provide transfer-free service between Greenbelt, Beltsville, Laurel, Arundel Mills, and BWI Thurgood Marshall Airport.

On June 24, 2018, the B30 was rerouted to serve Arundel Mills via Arundel Mills Boulevard.

On December 30, 2018, headways were increased from 60 to 70 minutes.

Through the years, WMATA proposed to eliminate all route B30 service due to low ridership and multiple alternative services. The route last operated on March 17, 2020, due to Metro's response to the COVID-19 pandemic. When WMATA began to increase service in August 2020, the B30 remained suspended. By September 2021, with WMATA beginning improved frequencies on high ridership routes, all suspended routes, including the B30 were no longer mentioned on WMATAs website.

Despite its elimination, there were calls from the public for WMATA to restore the B30, which was also called for during WMATA's Better Bus Redesign Proposal. Despite an overwhelming support for WMATA to restore the route, WMATA did not include a service to BWI Marshall Airport in its Better Bus Redesign draft, and its approval in November 2024.

== See also ==
- D.C.–Dulles Line
