= Greenbelt Line =

Greenbelt Line may refer to:

- An internal route name of Green Line (Washington Metro)
- Greenbelt Lines, Metrobus routes in Maryland, designated P20 or P21
