= Kenilworth Avenue Line =

Bus route

P14
- Kenilworth Avenue Line

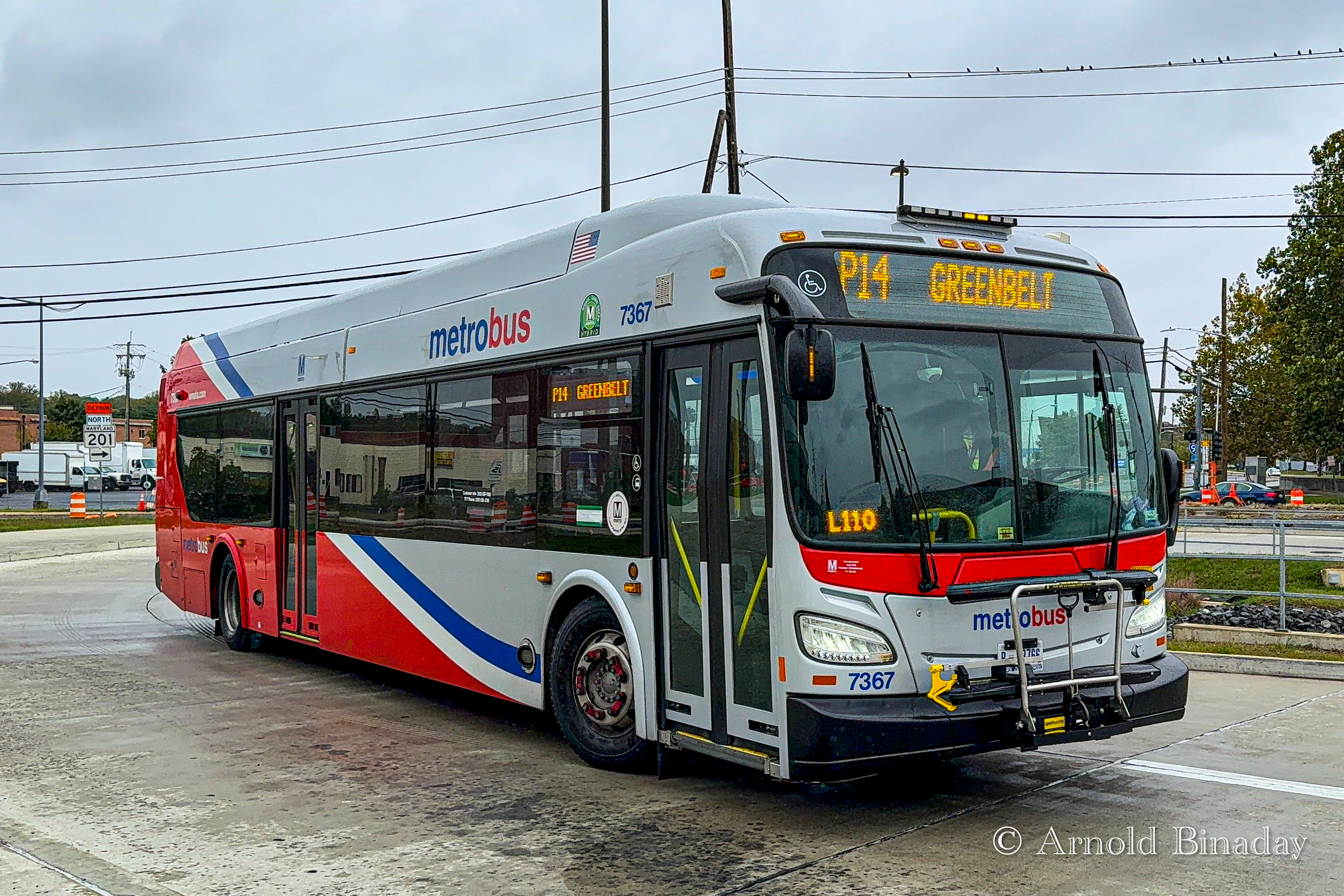
- Route P14 at College Park station

Overview
- System: Metrobus
- Operator: Washington Metropolitan Area Transit Authority
- Garage: Landover
- Livery: Local
- Status: Active
- Began service: 1963
- Ended service: R11: 2015; R12: June 29, 2025; R13, R14: 1978; R15: 1993

Route
- Locale: Prince George's County, Northeast
- Communities served: Deanwood, Tuxedo, Bladensburg, Rogers Heights, Edmonston, Riverdale Park, College Park, Berwyn Heights, Westchester Park, Franklin Park, Greenbelt
- Landmarks served: Franklin Park, Springhill Lake Apartments, Beltway Plaza, Westchester Park, College Park station
- Start: Greenbelt station
- Via: Kenilworth Avenue, Edmonston Road
- End: Deanwood station
- Length: 45 minutes

Service
- Level: Daily
- Frequency: 30 minutes
- Weekend frequency: 30-60 minutes
- Operates: 5:00 AM – 10:26 PM
- Ridership: 366,641 (FY 2025)
- Transfers: SmarTrip only
- Timetable: Kenilworth Avenue Line

The Kenilworth Avenue Line, designated Route P14, is a daily bus route operated by the Washington Metropolitan Area Transit Authority. It runs between Greenbelt station of the Green and Yellow Lines of the Washington Metro and Deanwood station of the Orange and Silver Lines of the Washington Metro. Buses run every 30 minutes Mondays-Saturdays and every 60 minutes on Sundays. Trips are roughly 45 minutes long.

== Background ==
Route P14 operates daily from Greenbelt station and Deanwood station mostly along Kenilworth Avenue. The route provides service along Kenilworth Avenue and smaller communities to various Metrorail stations. Route P14 operates out of Landover division.

=== Route P14 stops ===
Bus stop	Direction	Connections
Prince George's County, Maryland
Greenbelt Bus Bay F	Southbound station, Northbound terminal	Metrobus: P12, P20, P21, P32; RTA: 302/G; TheBus: P19, P22, P2X; Shuttle-UM: 129; BoltBus; Washington Metro: MARC: Camden Line
Greenbelt Metro Drive / Cherrywood Lane	Bidirectional	Metrobus: P12, P20, P21, P32; RTA: 302/G; TheBus: P22; Shuttle-UM: 129
Cherrywood Lane / Springhill Drive	Bidirectional	Metrobus: P20, P32; RTA: 302/G; TheBus: P22
Springhill Drive / Cherrywood Lane	Bidirectional	TheBus: P22
Springhill Drive / Cherrywood Terrace	Bidirectional	TheBus: P22
Springhill Drive / Springhill Lane	Bidirectional	TheBus: P22
Springhill Drive / Market Lane	Bidirectional	
Springhill Drive / Lakeside Drive	Bidirectional	
Edmonston Road / Springhill Drive	Bidirectional	
Edmonston Road / Springhill Court	Bidirectional	
Edmonston Road / Edmonston Court	Bidirectional	
Edmonston Road / Breezewood Drive	Bidirectional	
Breezewood Drive / Springhill Lane	Bidirectional	
Breezewood Drive / Cherrywood Terrace	Bidirectional	TheBus: P22
Breezewood Drive / Cherrywood Lane	Bidirectional	TheBus: P22
Cherrywood Lane / #5510	Bidirectional	Metrobus: P20, P32; RTA: 302/G; TheBus: P22
60th Avenue / Greenbelt Road	Bidirectional	
60th Avenue / Seminole Street	Bidirectional	
60th Avenue / Quebec Place	Northbound	
60th Avenue / Quebec Street	Southbound	
Cunningham Drive / Pontiac Street	Southbound	
Pontiac Street / Cunningham Drive	Northbound	
Pontiac Street / 60th Avenue	Bidirectional	
Pontiac Street / 63rd Avenue	Bidirectional	
Westchester Park Drive	Bidirectional	Shuttle-UM: 143
Edmonston Road / Pontiac Street	Bidirectional	
Edmonston Road / 63rd Avenue	Bidirectional	
Edmonston Road / Charlton Avenue	Bidirectional	
Edmonston Road / Bryn Mawr Road	Bidirectional	
Edmonston Road / Wellesley Drive	Bidirectional	
Edmonston Road / Knoxville Drive	Bidirectional	
Edmonston Road / Radcliffe Drive	Bidirectional	
Kenilworth Avenue / Good Luck Road	Northbound	
Campus Drive / 52nd Avenue	Bidirectional	
Campus Drive / 51st Avenue	Bidirectional	
College Park Bus Bay A	Bidirectional	Metrobus: M42, P10, P31; RTA: 302/G; TheBus: P37; Shuttle-UM: 104, 109; MTA Maryland: 204; Washington Metro: MARC: Camden Line; MTA: Purple Line (Planned)
River Road / American Physics Building	Bidirectional	Metrobus: P31
River Road / Rivertech Court	Bidirectional	Metrobus: P31
River Road / Haig Drive	Bidirectional	Metrobus: P31; MTA: Purple Line (at Riverdale Park North–UMD station) (Planned)
River Road / Kenilworth Avenue	Bidirectional	Metrobus: P31, P35
Kenilworth Avenue / Rittenhouse Street	Bidirectional	Metrobus: P31, P35
Kenilworth Avenue / Quintana Street	Bidirectional	Metrobus: P31, P35
Kenilworth Avenue / Powhatan Road	Southbound	Metrobus: P30, P31, P35, P42; MTA: Purple Line (at Riverdale Park-Kenilworth station) (Planned)
Kenilworth Avenue / East-West Highway	Northbound	Metrobus: P30, P31, P35, P42; MTA: Purple Line (at Riverdale Park-Kenilworth station) (Planned)
Kenilworth Avenue / Nicholson Street	Bidirectional	Metrobus: P42
Kenilworth Avenue / Jefferson Street	Northbound	Metrobus: P42
Kenilworth Avenue / Spring Lane	Southbound	Metrobus: P42
Kenilworth Avenue / Kennedy Street	Northbound	Metrobus: P42
Kenilworth Avenue / Greenway Drive	Southbound	Metrobus: P42
Kenilworth Avenue / Carters Lane	Northbound	Metrobus: P42
Kenilworth Avenue / Fountain Park Apartments	Bidirectional	
Kenilworth Avenue / Decatur Street	Bidirectional	
Kenilworth Avenue / Buchanan Street	Bidirectional	
Kenilworth Avenue / Upshur Street	Bidirectional	
Kenilworth Avenue / Kenilworth Towers	Bidirectional	
Kenilworth Avenue / 49th Avenue	Bidirectional	
Kenilworth Avenue / Lawrence Street	Bidirectional	
Kenilworth Avenue / 52nd Avenue	Bidirectional	
Kenilworth Avenue / Lydell Road	Bidirectional	TheBus: P22
Kenilworth Avenue / #2529	Northbound	TheBus: P22
Kenilworth Avenue / Creston Street	Southbound	TheBus: P22
John Hanson Highway
Baltimore–Washington Parkway
Northeast Washington, D.C.
Eastern Avenue / Olive Street NE	Bidirectional	Metrobus: C35, C63
Minnesota Avenue NE / Quarles Street NE	Bidirectional	Metrobus: C35, C63, D24, P62
Minnesota Avenue NE / 48th Street NE	Northbound	Metrobus: C35, C63, D24, P62
Deanwood Bus Bay C	Northbound station, Southbound terminal	Metrobus: C35, C63, D24, P62; Washington Metro:

== History ==
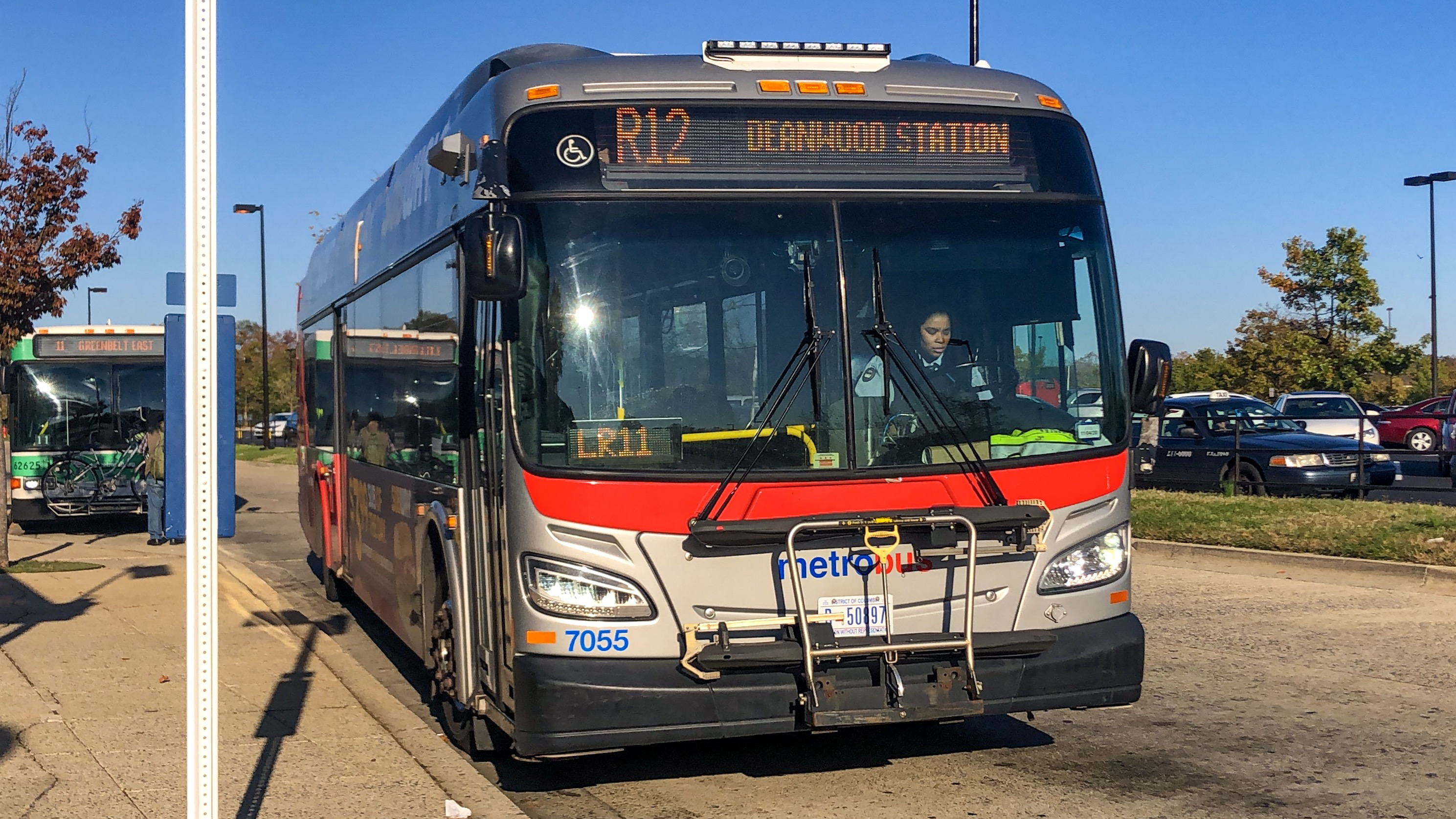
Former Route R12 at Greenbelt station in 2019

Route R12 was created as a brand new express streetcar route around 1963 operating as an express streetcar route all the way between Farragut Square in Downtown D.C. & Goddard Space Flight Center in Greenbelt weekdays only, and between Federal Triangle and Beltway Plaza Mall on Saturdays as part of the "Kenilworth Avenue Express" Streetcar Line, with routes R11 & R15 operating between Farrugut Square & Springhill Lake Apartment Complex peak hours only, and routes R13 & R14 operating between Southwest D.C. & the Macke Industrial Park Complex.

In 1973, all routes were converted into Metrobus Routes when WMATA took over all of the streetcar companies that operated throughout the Washington D.C. Metropolitan Area and merged them all into its "Metrobus" System keeping their exact same routing as their streetcar lines.

Following the opening of Stadium–Armory station, routes R11, R12, & R15 were shorten to terminate their routes at the Stadium Armory on July 18, 1977 with all routes discontinuing service to Farragut Square. Routes R11 and R15 will also operate during early Saturday morning trips before the first Blue Line train operated.

Routes R13 and R14 were discontinued on July 18, 1977 being replaced by the R11, R12, and R15

On September 26, 1977, early Saturday morning service on routes R11 & R15's were discontinued, due to new Blue and Orange Line service being introduced during earlier times on Saturday mornings. Weekday peak hour service was not changed.

On December 3, 1978, shortly after Deanwood station opened, R12 was truncated even further to only operate up to Deanwood station discontinuing service to Stadium–Armory station. Route R11 and R15 were rerouted to operate as a brand new express route between Beltway Plaza Mall (R11)/Greenbelt Center (R15) and New Carrollton station, running primarily along via Greenbelt Road, Cherrywood Lane, Kenilworth Avenue, the Capital Beltway, and John Hanson Highway.

As a result of these changes, R11 & R15 were split their own separate line as the, "Greenbelt-New Carrollton Express Line" while R12 remained a part of its own line, which was renamed the, "Kenilworth Avenue Line".

On January 4, 1981 when Addison Road station opened, R12 was extended from Deanwood station to Addison Road station via Minnesota Avenue NE, and route P12's former routing on Addison Road, Palmer Highway, Addison Road, Seat Pleasant Drive, Hill Road, and Central Avenue when P12 discontinue service to Deanwood. On the other hand, during the time this particular change took place, R12 was truncated to only operate up to the Beltway Plaza Mall, discontinuing service to Goddard Space Flight Center. Route R12 was renamed the " Kenilworth Avenue–Addison Road" Line as of result.

=== From 1990 ===
On December 11, 1993, when both College Park–University of Maryland station & Greenbelt station opened, R12 was rerouted to operate between Deanwood & New Carrollton stations, via the segment of its route between the Deanwood station and intersection of Keniworth Avenue and River Road. Route R12 would run along River Road to serve College Park station, before returning onto River Road to rejoin Kenilworth Avenue. R12 would then operate on the same exact routing it had been operating on between the intersection of Kenilworth Avenue & River Road and Beltway Plaza, and run along Cherrywood Lane to serve Greenbelt station. Then R12 would operate past the Capital Office Park & Greenbelt Federal Courthouse, before turning onto Kenilworth Avenue, and then operating the rest of the way to the New Carrollton station, Route R12 was renamed the, "Kenilworth Avenue-New Carrollton Line".

Also Routes R11 and R15 were discontinued and was replaced by the R12 which operates on a combination of both former routes between Greenbelt & the New Carrollton station, essentially replacing both of those Metrobus Routes in their entirety. The segment of R12's former route between the Deanwood & Addison Road station, was replaced by both routes V14 & V15, which were extended from Addison Road to operate between Deanwood station & Penn Mar Shopping Center, via R12's former routing.

=== From 2010 ===
Bus service in Greenbelt, Maryland were controversial over the last few years due to lack of services. The proposal was mentioned as part of Metro's systemwide bus and rail cuts proposed during a budget crisis in spring of 2010. The Metro Board then took all service cuts off the table before approving the budget for this fiscal year. Alterations to Greenbelts bus service came back up at the request of the City and Prince George's County. At the time of the proposal, the R12 was suffering bus bunching and scheduling problems due to its long route.

Proposals were set for route R12 including shortening the section to Greenbelt station with the Greenbelt to New Carrollton portion to be replaced by a new route T14 operating between Goddard Corporate Park and Beltway Plaza along the old R12 routing in Old Greenbelt. This however would lead to a reduction of service and a loss of a direct route from route R12 routing to New Carrollton station.

Other proposals were a route G12 would run on route R12's routing in Old Greenbelt running between Greenbelt station and New Carrollton station in May and discontinue service into Franklin Park and the Beltway Plaza loop being replaced by route G14 and G16. In September 2010, it was proposed for route R12 to still terminate at Greenbelt station and split the Greenbelt to New Carrollton station portion to route G12 but route R12 would serve Franklin Park instead of route G14 and G16 and serve the Beltway Plaza loop.

On December 19, 2010, R12 was shorten to only operate between Deanwood station & Greenbelt station. The rest of its route between Greenbelt and New Carrollton station, was replaced by a new route G12 under the request of the city of Greenbelt to break R12's super lengthy route into two separate routes and in order to improve service reliability, adherence to schedule times, and avoid duplication with the already existing Prince George's County TheBus Routes & other Metrobus Routes.

Route R12 was rerouted inside Franklin Park and the Springhill Lake Complex. Buses previously operated along Edmonston Road, Springhill Drive, Springhill Lane, Breezewood Drive, and backtrack to Beltway Plaza Mall via Cherrywood Lane and Greenbelt Road before running again on Cherrywood Lane to Greenbelt station going northbound and from Greenbelt to Beltway Plaza to Springhill Lake Complex going southbound under the same path. The route was change to operate along Greenbelt Road, Beltway Plaza, Cherrywood Lane, Breezewood Drive, Edmonston Road, Springhill Drive, and back along Cherrywood Lane to Greenbelt station Northbound. The route would operate vice versa going from Greenbelt station, Springhill Lake Complex, and Beltway Plaza going southbound. Service along Springhill Lane was replaced by TheBus route 16.

Route R12 was also rerouted to operate along Campus drive to/from College Park–University of Maryland station instead of backtracking along River Road in order to add Metrobus service to the parks and recreational centers along Campus drive. Route R12 would only operate along River Road one way in both directions. Route R11 was also reincarnated back into service to operate parallel to R12 operating during weekday early mornings, skipping R12's diversion into the Springhill Lake Apartment Complex and Beltway Plaza.

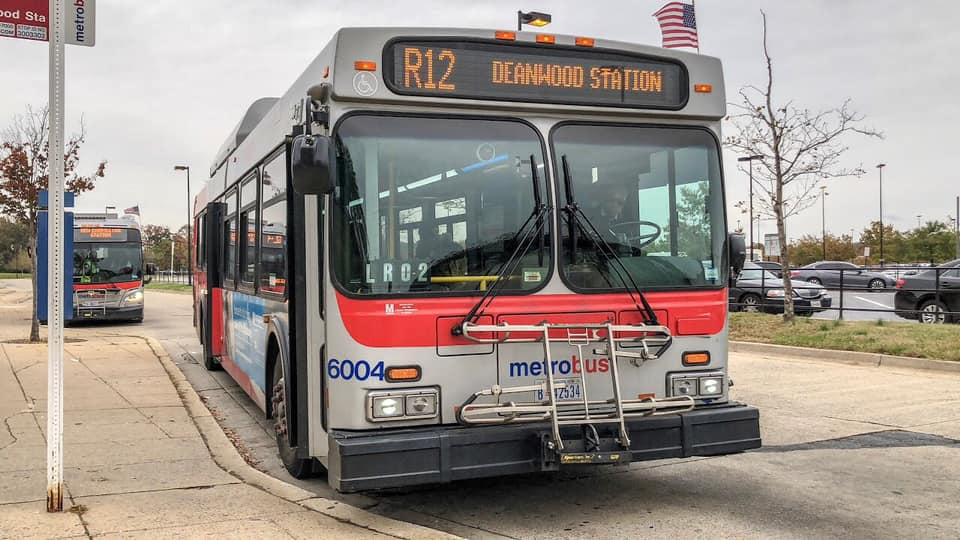
Former Route R12 at Greenbelt Station in 2018

On August 23, 2015, the R11 was discontinued and replaced by more frequent route R12 service. These services would not enter Beltway Plaza.

Beginning on September 1, 2019 for nine months, the College Park Metrobus loop was temporarily closed for construction of the Purple line at College Park station having all stops located along River Road. As of a result, route R12's bus stops were moved onto River Road in order to serve the station. There were no detours that affected route R12.

During the COVID-19 pandemic, the R12 was relegated to operate on its Saturday supplemental schedule beginning on March 16, 2020. However beginning on March 18, 2020, the route was further reduced to operate on its regular Saturday schedule with the supplemental trips not operating and having no Saturday service when WMATA implemented its modified Sunday schedule and regular Sunday service during the weekends. Additional service was brought back on August 23, 2020; however, Saturday service remained suspended.

On September 26, 2020, WMATA proposed to eliminate all route R12 Saturday service and reduce weekday service to only every 60 minutes due to low federal funding. However on March 14, 2021, all route R12 Saturday service was restored.

On September 5, 2021, full service was restored on the R12. On May 29, 2022, Saturday service was increased to operate earlier.

On June 12, 2022, service to the east side of College Park station resumed with buses serving Bus Bay G.

In 2024 during WMATA's FY2024 Budget crisis, WMATA proposed to eliminate all R12 service. However on April 25, 2024, Metro’s Board of Directors approved a $4.8 billion capital and operating budget which avoided service cuts.

=== Better Bus Redesign ===
In 2022, WMATA launched its Better Bus Redesign project, which aimed to redesign the entire Metrobus Network and is the first full redesign of the agency's bus network in its history.

In April 2023, WMATA launched its Draft Visionary Network. As part of the drafts, WMATA proposed to keep the R12 mostly the same, except the route was to serve the Berwyn Heights neighborhood between the Beltway Plaza Mall loop, and Westchester Park via Pontiac Street, Cunningham Drive, Berwyn Road, 57th Avenue, Quebec Street, and 60th Avenue, essentially swapping routing with TheBus Route 16. The line would be named Route MD253.

During WMATA's Revised Draft Visionary Network, WMATA renamed the MD253 to Route P14, and it would be modified in Berwyn Heights to no longer serve Berwyn Road, 57th Avenue, or Quebec Street. The route would also no longer operate to the Beltway Plaza Loop, and would instead remain on Cherrywood Lane. WMATA would also include new Sunday service on the proposed P14, something the R12 never had. The change was then proposed during WMATA's 2025 Proposed Network.

On November 21, 2024, WMATA approved its Better Bus Redesign Network, with service on the Kenilworth Avenue Line being simplified.

Beginning on June 29, 2025, Route R12 routing was mostly kept the same, except it was modified to serve the Berwyn Heights neighborhood via Pontiac Street, Cunningham Drive, and 60th Avenue, swapping routing with TheBus Route 16, which was rerouted to serve the Beltway Plaza Mall loop. The R12 was also renamed Route P14 and added brand new Sunday service.
