= Chillum Road-New Carrollton Line =

Bus route in Washington, D.C., United States

P42
- Chillum Road-New Carrollton Line

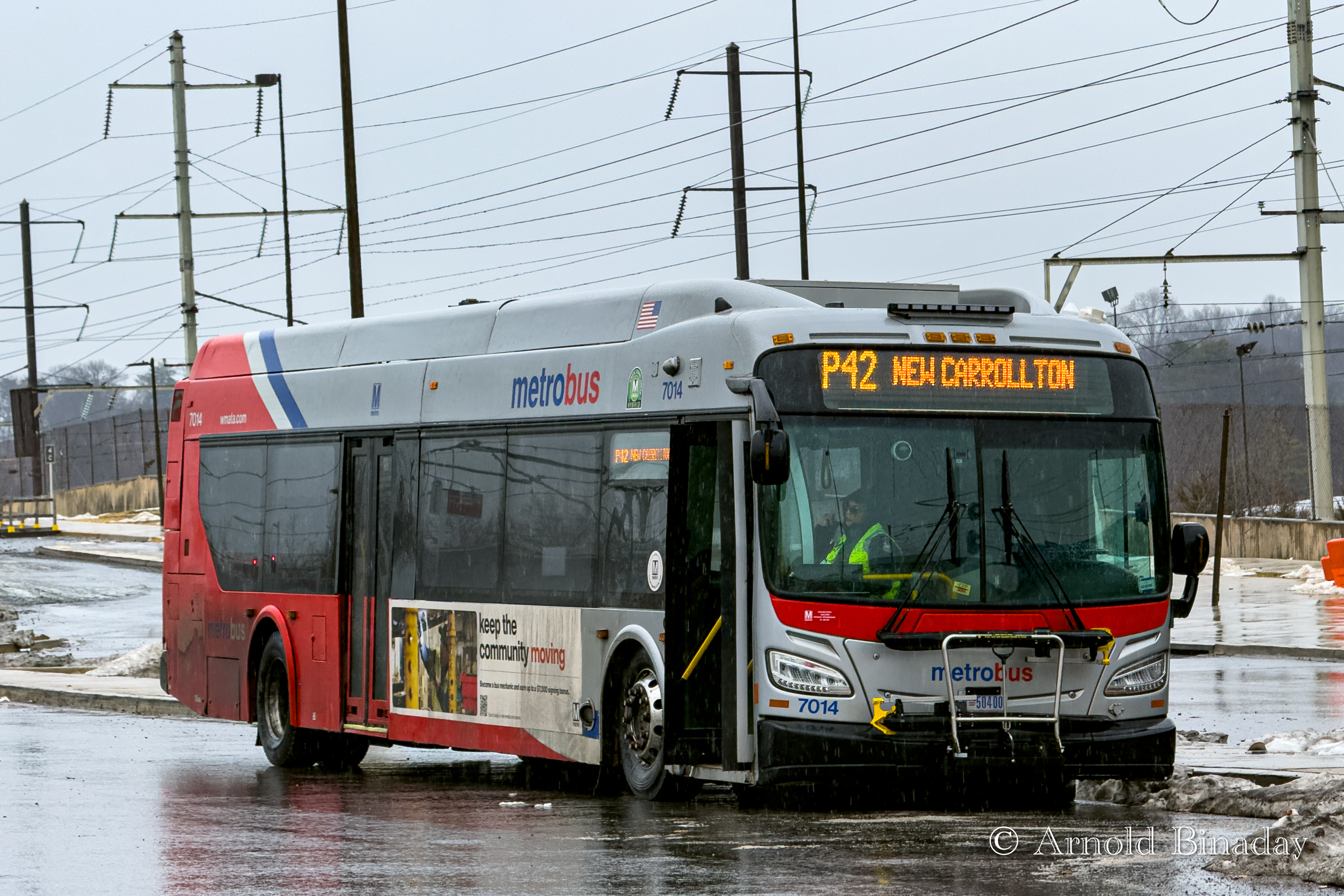
- Route P42 at New Carrollton station

Overview
- System: Metrobus
- Operator: Washington Metropolitan Area Transit Authority
- Garage: Landover
- Livery: Local
- Status: Active
- Began service: 1950s-1960s
- Predecessors: 84, 85, F1, T14

Route
- Locale: Prince George's County, Northeast, Northwest
- Communities served: New Carrollton, Riverdale Park, Edmonston, Bladensburg, Colmar Manor, Cottage City, Fort Lincoln, Mount Rainier, Hyattsville, Avondale, Chillum, Takoma Park, Takoma
- Landmarks served: East Pines, Riverdale Park, Edmonston, Bladensburg, Peace Cross, Colmar Manor, Cottage City, Fort Lincoln, The Shops at Dakota Crossing, Avondale, Chillum
- Start: New Carrollton station
- Via: Eastern Avenue, Chillum Road, Bladensburg Road, Annapolis Road, Edmonston Road, Kenilworth Avenue, Good Luck Road
- End: Takoma station

Service
- Level: Daily
- Frequency: 20-30 minutes
- Weekend frequency: 30 minutes
- Operates: 5:30 AM – 9:30 PM
- Ridership: 545,955 (FY 2025)
- Transfers: SmarTrip only
- Timetable: Chillum Road-New Carrollton Line

The Chillum Road-New Carrollton Line, designated Route P42, is a daily bus route operated by the Washington Metropolitan Area Transit Authority between the New Carrollton station of the Orange and Silver Lines of the Washington Metro and Takoma station of the Red Line of the Washington Metro. The line operates every 20-30 during the weekdays and 30 minutes during the weekends. Route P42 trips roughly takes 70 minutes to complete.

== Background ==
Route P42 operates daily between New Carrollton station and Takoma station primarily running into neighborhoods. Route P42 operates out of Landover division.

=== Route P42 stops ===
Bus stop	Direction	Connections
Prince George's County, Maryland
New Carrollton station Bus Bay K	Westbound station, Eastbound terminal	Metrobus: P20, P21, P24, P30, P31, P35, P40, P60, P61; MTA Maryland Commuter Bus; TheBus: P22, P23, P2X, P44, P52, P5X, P71; Greyhound; Peter Pan Bus Lines; Washington Metro: MARC: Penn Line; Amtrak: Northeast Regional, Palmetto, Vermonter; MTA: Purple Line (Planned)
85th Avenue / Lenox Court Apartments	Westbound	TheBus: P22
85th Avenue / Carrollan Gardens Condos	Eastbound	TheBus: P22
85th Avenue / Carrollan Manor Apartments	Bidirectional	TheBus: P22
85th Avenue / Longfellow Street	Bidirectional	
85th Avenue / Legation Road	Westbound	
Westbrook Drive / 85th Avenue	Eastbound	
Westbrook Drive / Madison Street	Westbound	
Westbrook Drive / Nicholson Street	Eastbound	
Westbrook Drive / Oglethorpe Street	Westbound	
Westbrook Drive / Oliver Street	Eastbound	
Westbrook Drive / Powhatan Street	Westbound	
Powhatan Street / Westbrook Drive	Eastbound	
85th Place / Powhatan Street	Bidirectional	
85th Place / Fremont Street	Bidirectional	
85th Place / Carrollton Parkway	Westbound	
85th Place / Ravenswood Road	Eastbound	
Carrollton Parkway / 85th Place	Bidirectional	
Carrollton Parkway / Fairbanks Street	Bidirectional	
Carrollton Parkway / Quentin Street	Bidirectional	
Carrollton Parkway / Lamont Drive	Westbound	TheBus: P22
Lamont Drive / Carrollton Parkway	Eastbound	TheBus: P22
Lamont Drive / Quentin Street	Bidirectional	TheBus: P22
Lamont Drive / Fairbanks Street	Westbound	TheBus: P22
Lamont Drive / Lamont Place	Eastbound	TheBus: P22
Good Luck Road / Lamont Elementary School	Bidirectional	
Good Luck Road / Nashville Road	Bidirectional	
Good Luck Road / Harland Street	Westbound	
Good Luck Road / Trexler Road	Eastbound	
Good Luck Road / Ian Street	Westbound	
Good Luck Road / Adrian Street	Eastbound	
Auburn Avenue / Chestnut Avenue	Bidirectional	Metrobus: P35
Auburn Avenue / 3rd Street	Bidirectional	Metrobus: P35
Auburn Avenue / 2nd Street	Bidirectional	Metrobus: P35
Auburn Avenue / 1st Street	Bidirectional	Metrobus: P35
Auburn Avenue / Riverdale Road	Bidirectional	Metrobus: P30, P31, P35
Riverdale Road / Auburn Avenue	Westbound	Metrobus: P30, P31
Riverdale Road / 67th Place	Westbound	Metrobus: P30, P31
Riverdale Road / 67th Avenue	Bidirectional	Metrobus: P30, P31; MTA: Purple Line (at Beacon Heights-East Pines station (Planned)
Riverdale Road / 64th Avenue	Westbound	Metrobus: P30, P31
Riverdale Road / Eastpine Drive	Eastbound	Metrobus: P30, P31
Riverdale Road / Mustang Drive	Westbound	Metrobus: P30, P31
Riverdale Road / 63rd Avenue	Eastbound	Metrobus: P30, P31
Riverdale Road / 61st Avenue	Westbound	Metrobus: P30, P31
Riverdale Road / 57th Avenue	Bidirectional	Metrobus: P14, P30, P31, P35; MTA: Purple Line (at Riverdale Park-Kenilworth station) (Planned)
Kenilworth Avenue / Nicholson Street	Bidirectional	Metrobus: P14
Kenilworth Avenue / Nicholson Street	Bidirectional	Metrobus: P14
Kenilworth Avenue / Jefferson Street	Eastbound	Metrobus: P14
Kenilworth Avenue / Spring Lane	Westbound	Metrobus: P14
Kenilworth Avenue / Kennedy Street	Eastbound	Metrobus: P14
Kenilworth Avenue / Greenway Drive	Bidirectional	Metrobus: P14
Edmonston Road / Hamilton Street	Bidirectional	
Edmonston Road / Gallatin Street	Bidirectional	
Edmonston Road / Farragut Street	Eastbound	
Edmonston Road / Emerson Street	Bidirectional	
Edmonston Road / Decatur Street	Bidirectional	
Edmonston Road / Chesapeake Road	Bidirectional	
Edmonston Road / Buchanan Street	Bidirectional	
Edmonston Road / 51st Street	Bidirectional	
Edmonston Road / Upshur Street	Westbound	
Edmonston Road / Tilden Road	Eastbound	
Edmonston Road / Taylor Street	Bidirectional	
Edmonston Road / Annapolis Road	Bidirectional	Metrobus: P40; TheBus: P43
Annapolis Road / 48th Street	Bidirectional	Metrobus: P40; TheBus: P43
Annapolis Road / 46th Street	Bidirectional	Metrobus: P40; TheBus: P43
Bladensburg Road / 43rd Avenue	Bidirectional	Metrobus: P40; TheBus: P43
Bladensburg Road / 42nd Avenue	Eastbound	Metrobus: P40; TheBus: P43
Bladensburg Road / 41st Avenue	Westbound	Metrobus: P40; TheBus: P43
Bladensburg Road / 40th Place	Eastbound	Metrobus: P40; TheBus: P43
Bladensburg Road / 40th Avenue	Eastbound	Metrobus: P40; TheBus: P43
Bladensburg Road / 38th Avenue	Bidirectional	Metrobus: P40; TheBus: P43
Bladensburg Road / Fort Lincoln Cemetery	Bidirectional	
Bladensburg Road / Eastern Avenue	Bidirectional	Metrobus: C41
Washington, D.C.
Fort Lincoln Drive NE / Robert Clifton Weaver Way NE	Bidirectional	Metrobus: C63, D32
Fort Lincoln Drive NE / 33rd Place NE	Bidirectional	Metrobus: C63, D32
Market Street NE / Lowe's	Bidirectional	Metrobus: C63, D32
Market Street NE / Costco	Bidirectional	Metrobus: C63, D32
Commodore Joshua Barney Drive NE / Jamison Street NE	Bidirectional	Metrobus: D32
Commodore Joshua Barney Drive NE / Recreation Center	Bidirectional	Metrobus: D32
Eastern Avenue / Bladensburg Road	Westbound	Metrobus: C41
Eastern Avenue / 34th Street	Westbound	Metrobus: C41
Eastern Avenue / Monroe Street NE	Eastbound	Metrobus: C41
Eastern Avenue / Rhode Island Avenue NE	Eastbound	Metrobus: C41, P10, P1X, P40
Eastern Avenue / Perry Street NE	Bidirectional	Metrobus: C41, P10, P1X, P40
Eastern Avenue / Randolph Street NE	Eastbound	Metrobus: D34
Eastern Avenue / Bunker Hill Road	Westbound	Metrobus: D34
Eastern Avenue / 28th Street	Westbound	Metrobus: D34
Eastern Avenue / Russell Avenue	Bidirectional	Metrobus: D34
Eastern Avenue / Kaywood Place	Bidirectional	Metrobus: D34
Eastern Avenue / Varnum Street NE	Bidirectional	Metrobus: D34
Eastern Avenue / 20th Street NE	Westbound	Metrobus: D34
Eastern Avenue / Michigan Avenue NE	Bidirectional	Metrobus: D34, P33
Prince George's County, Maryland
LaSalle Road / Woodreeve Road	Bidirectional	
LaSalle Road / Ingraham Street	Eastbound	
LaSalle Road / 19th Avenue	Westbound	
19th Avenue / Chillum Road	Bidirectional	
Chillum Road / Longford Drive	Bidirectional	Metrobus: P32
Chillum Road / 18th Avenue	Bidirectional	Metrobus: P32
Chillum Road / 16th Avenue	Bidirectional	Metrobus: P32
Chillum Road / Sargent Road	Bidirectional	Metrobus: P32, P35
Chillum Road / Twin Oak Drive	Bidirectional	
Chillum Road / 10th Place	Westbound	
Chillum Road / Chillumgate Road	Bidirectional	
Chillum Road / Riggs Road	Bidirectional	Metrobus: P15, P16
Chillum Road / #812	Westbound	
Chillum Road / #815	Eastbound	
Chillum Road / Berkshire Drive	Bidirectional	
Chillum Road / Eastern Avenue	Eastbound	Metrobus: M60, M6X
Washington, D.C.
Eastern Avenue / New Hampshire Avenue	Westbound	Metrobus: M60, M6X
Eastern Avenue / 5th Avenue	Westbound	
Eastern Avenue / Tuckerman Street NE	Eastbound	
Eastern Avenue / Kansas Avenue NE	Bidirectional	Metrobus: C77 (Northbound only)
Eastern Avenue / North Capitol Street	Bidirectional	Metrobus: C77
Eastern Avenue / Whittier Street NW	Eastbound	Metrobus: C77 (Southbound only)
Eastern Avenue / Walnut Avenue	Westbound	Metrobus: C77
Eastern Avenue / Walnut Street NW	Eastbound	Metrobus: C77
Eastern Avenue / Laurel Avenue	Westbound	Metrobus: C77
Eastern Avenue / Laurel Street NW	Eastbound	Metrobus: C77
Takoma station Bus Bay D	Eastbound station, Westbound terminal	Metrobus: C75, C77, D50, D5X; Ride On: 12, 13, 14, 16, 18, 24, 25; Metropolitan Branch Trail; Washington Metro:

== History ==
Route T14 was originally named the Bowie-Belair Line and operated alongside the former route T12 Route between Rhode Island Avenue-Brentwood station and Bowie State University, between March 27, 1976, when both routes were created as brand new Metrobus Routes. Then on December 3, 1978, when New Carrollton station opened, both routes T12 & T14 were truncated to only operate between New Carrollton station & Bowie State University. In the early 1990s, the line was discontinued and replaced by routes B24, B25, and B27.

Routes 84 and 85 operated alongside much of exactly the same routing, even when both routes were still streetcar routes that had yet to become Metrobus routes with route 84 operating daily and route 85 operating peak hours only. Routes 84 and 85 originally operated all the way between West Potomac Park & the Eastpine Shopping Center in Riverdale mostly operating via, Riverdale Road, Kenilworth Avenue, Edmonston Road, Annapolis Road, Bladensburg Road, and North Capitol Street, to Downtown Washington D.C. as streetcar routes and the first few years of being Metrobus routes in 1973.

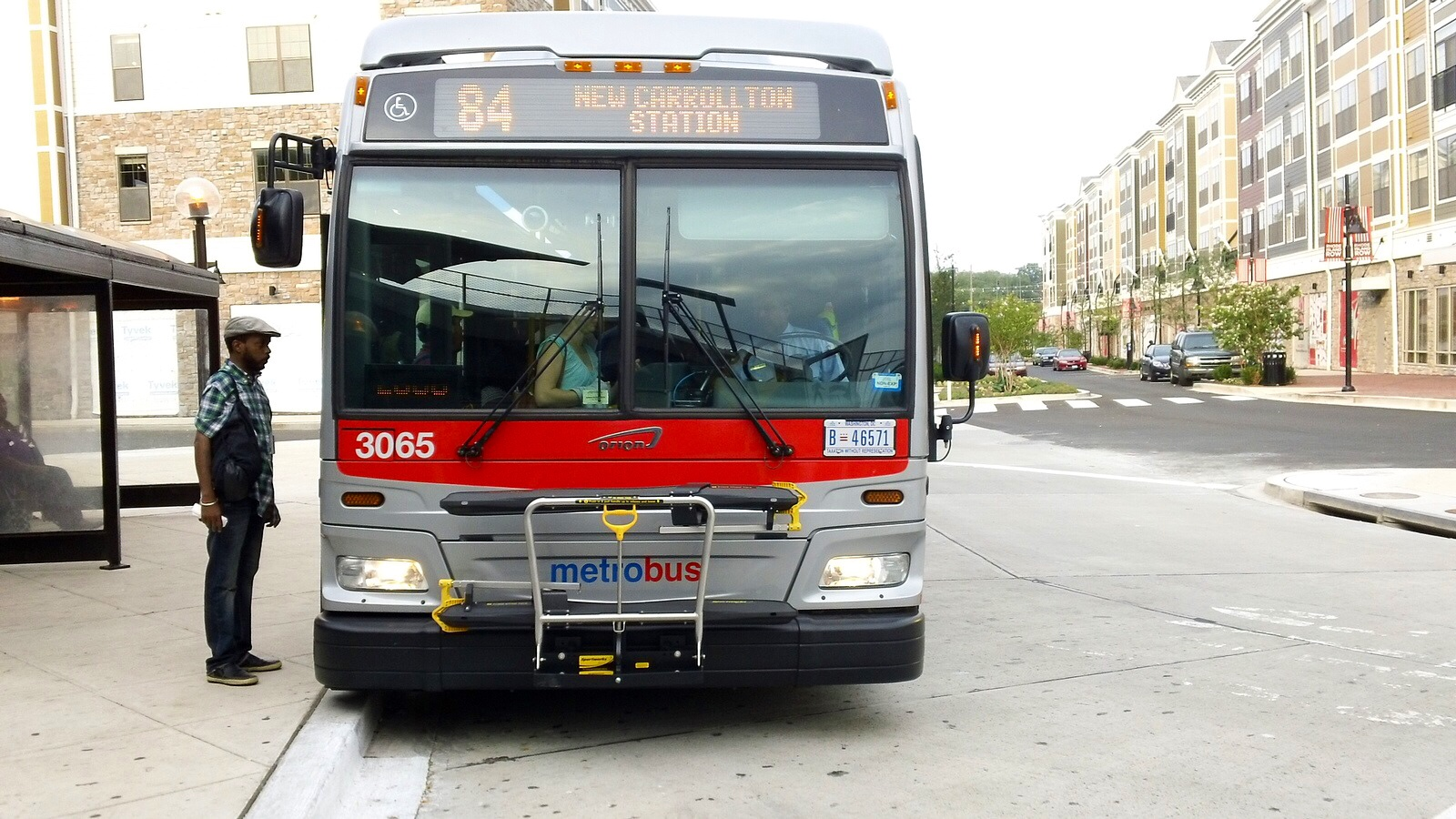
Former Route 84 running to New Carrollton Station in 2014

On March 27, 1976, routes 84 & 85 were rerouted to make a turn from Rhode Island Avenue, onto the intersection of Washington Place to enter and serve the newly opened Rhode Island Avenue–Brentwood station. Routes 84 & 85 would then loop back onto Washington Place and then make a turn to get back onto Rhode Island Avenue and follow the rest of their routing along with routes 82, 83, & 86, the rest of the way from the Rhode Island Avenue–Brentwood station all the way up to West Potomac Park via Downtown Washington D.C. The routes would also serve Rhode Island when going Southbound.

On September 21, 1978, routes 82, 83, 86, 84, 85 were shorten to terminate at Rhode Island Avenue–Brentwood station only due to it being cost effective and duplicate to both the Red Line and other Metrobus routes. Passengers would have to transfer to either another Metrobus route or the Red Line to travel the rest of the way to Downtown Washington D.C. or West Potomac Park from Rhode Island Avenue–Brentwood station.

On November 21, 1978, when New Carrollton station opened, routes 84 & 85 were extended from their terminus at Eastpine Shopping Center, to New Carrollton station via Riverdale Road, Auburn Avenue, Good Luck Road, Lamont Drive, Carrollton Parkway, 85th Place, Powhatan Street, Westbrook Drive, 85th Avenue, West Lanham Drive, and Ellin Road. While route 84 would be the main route that operated seven days a week between Rhode Island Avenue–Brentwood station & New Carrollton, route 85 would operate during weekday peak hours that would only allow passengers to board in Washington D.C. and alight in Maryland. Route 84 would still serve the Eastpine Shopping Center terminal while route 85 will bypass the terminal inside the shopping center.

On December 30, 2007, route 85 was discontinued and replaced it with modified route 84 trips which would have the same restrictions as the route 85 trips, while allowing passengers to board in Washington D.C. and alight in Maryland. During that same time, route 84's diversion into the Eastpine Shopping Center was removed and route 84 was rerouted to follow 85's routing straight along Riverdale Road through the Eastpine Shopping Center.

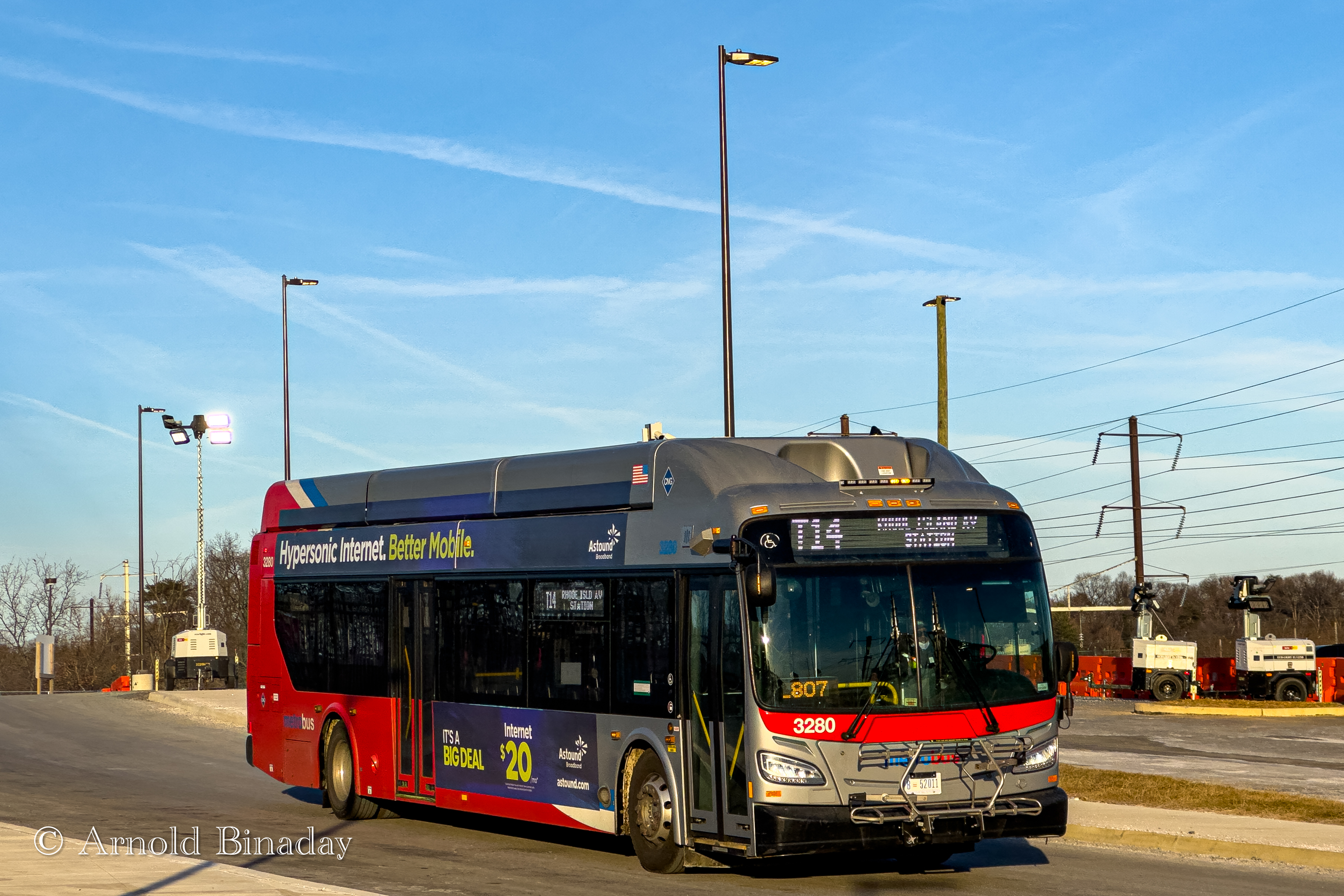
Former Route T14 at New Carrollton station in January 2025

On December 14, 2014, route 84 was renamed Route T14 keeping the same routing and discontinuing the 84 designation. WMATA also began a new limited-stop segment along Rhode Island Avenue between Mount Rainier terminal and Rhode Island Avenue-Brentwood station along with route T18. The limited stop segment was to reduce bus bunching along Rhode Island Avenue and improve on time performance for routes T14 and T18. Buses would only serve the following stops:

- Rhode Island Ave & 12th St NE
- Rhode Island Ave & Montana Ave NE (eastbound)/14th St NE (westbound)
- Rhode Island Ave & 18th St NE
- Rhode Island Ave & South Dakota Ave NE (eastbound)/24th St NE (westbound)
- Rhode Island Ave & Newton St NE

Passengers wishing for local service will have to use routes 83 or 86.

During the COVID-19 pandemic, the route was relegated to operate on its Saturday supplemental schedule beginning on March 16, 2020. However, beginning on March 18, 2020, the route was further reduced to operate on its Sunday schedule. Also beginning on March 21, 2020, all weekend service was suspended. On August 23, 2020, route T14 was restored to its regular weekday schedule but with a reduced Saturday schedule and all Sunday schedule suspended.

On September 26, 2020, WMATA proposed to eliminate all route T14 Sunday service due to low federal funding in response to the COVID-19 pandemic. However on March 14, 2021, Route T14 Sunday service was restored.

In 2024 during WMATA's FY2024 Budget crisis, WMATA proposed to eliminate all T14 service between Mount Rainier Terminal and Rhode Island Avenue station, with service being replaced by Routes 83, 86, and T18. However on April 25, 2024, Metro’s Board of Directors approved a $4.8 billion capital and operating budget which avoided service cuts.

=== Better Bus Redesign ===
In 2022, WMATA launched its Better Bus Redesign project, which aimed to redesign the entire Metrobus Network and is the first full redesign of the agency's bus network in its history.

In April 2023, WMATA launched its Draft Visionary Network. As part of the drafts, WMATA proposed to shorten the T14 to terminate at Mount Rainier Terminal, and it was named Route MD252 in the drafts. Service to Rhode Island Avenue station would be covered by other Metrobus routes.

During WMATA's Revised Draft Visionary Network, WMATA renamed the MD252 to Route P42 and the route was changed to operate to Takoma station via the current F1 routing (and proposed MD342 routing) along Chillum Road, La Salle Road, Eastern Avenue NE, Fort Lincoln Drive NE, Joshua Barney Drive NE, Colmar Manor, and Fort Lincoln. Service along 38th Street and Rhode Island Avenue was taken over by Route T18 (renamed to Route P40). The current T14 routing between New Carrollton station and the intersection of Bladensburg Road & 38th Street remained the same. The change was then proposed during WMATA's 2025 Proposed Network.

On November 21, 2024, WMATA approved its Better Bus Redesign Network.

Beginning on June 29, 2025, Route T14 was modified to serve Takoma station via Chillum Road and Fort Lincoln, then follow the current routing between Bladensburg Road and New Carrollton. The line was also renamed to Route P42. This also partially reincarnates the former Route B9 routing between Colmar Manor and Fort Lincoln.
