= Beltway Plaza Mall =

Beltway Plaza
- Beltway Plaza Mall logo
- Location: Greenbelt, Maryland, United States
- Coordinates: 38°59′57.8″N 76°54′29.3″W
- Opened: October 17, 1963
- Developer: Sidney J. Brown and First National Realty
- Manager: Quantum Companies
- Num. of stores: 100
- Floor area: 900,000 square feet (84,000 m^{2})
- Floors: 2 (2nd floor is small)
- Public transit: GoPGC: P22; Metrobus: P14, P20, P32
- Website: beltwayplazamall.com

The Beltway Plaza mall is located in Greenbelt, Maryland. It was developed by Sidney J. Brown and First National Realty, opening on October 17, 1963. It was originally composed of a massive S. Klein department store separated by a large parking lot from an A&P Supermarket located in a strip shopping center along with a barbershop, single screen movie theater, and Drug Fair store. By 1972-73, a small indoor mall was created, situated between the strip shopping center and the S. Klein store, that included a 6-screen theater, steakhouse (Emerson's Steakhouse), a branch of George's appliance store chain, an ice cream shop, and in-house catalog store.

Within a few years of the S. Klein closing in 1975, the mall underwent major renovations. In the course of renovations, the space occupied by S. Klein was split up to create new spaces for different stores. Small fountains were added. The renovations included an additional 8-screen cinema and a Giant supermarket that was added to one wing of the former shopping strip. The renovation also enclosed the area from the original mall to the supermarket.

The mall has 115 stores and restaurants and anchors include a Giant supermarket, Burlington Coat Factory, Marshalls, JoAnn Fabrics, Target, Shoppers World, and TJ Maxx (opened May 2014). (Shoppers World and the former Big Lots replaced a space formerly occupied by Value City until 2010.) The Target cannot be reached from the mall without going outdoors, though it shares a common roof.

== History ==
On July 15, 1962, The Washington Post and Times-Herald published a sketch of the 320,000-square-foot (30,000 m^{2}) department store of the S. Klein chain, to be constructed in the Beltway Plaza Regional Shopping Center in Greenbelt, Maryland. At the time the two-story and basement structure would be the largest Washington suburban department store and was expected to open the following Easter. Maryland Governor J. Millard Tawes witnessed the signing of the 30-year lease (the store would last only 13) between the plaza developer and S. Klein. The store opened on Oct 17, 1963.

The Beltway Plaza property is home to some perilous slopes that have periodically given way. During construction of the store, in December 1962, five men died and 11 were injured in a basement earth slide and the mall was forced to close for a short period in 1966. S. Klein was at Beltway Plaza until 1975, when the chain decided to close the store. The Washington Post of Feb 6, 1975 (p. G14) reported:

S. Klein Department Stores, a New York retailer that was a pioneer in the discount business, is closing its two big Washington area stores within six weeks, industry sources said yesterday. Officers of the company, a subsidiary of McCrory Corp., refused to conform [sic] or deny the reports.

In the weeks prior to September 11, 2001, all five of the terrorists who hijacked American Airlines Flight 77 and flew it into the Pentagon had frequently visited Beltway Plaza mall, including Giant Food, Gold's Gym, and Burlington Coat Factory.
