= Greenbelt station =

Washington Metro and MARC Train station

Coordinates: 39.011068°N 76.911011°W

Greenbelt
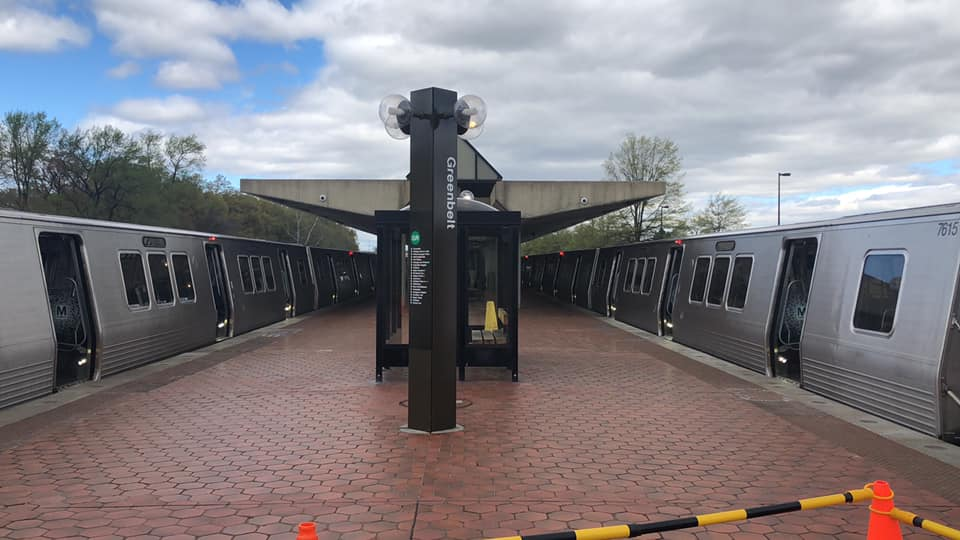
- Greenbelt station platform in April 2019

General information
- Location: 5600-5717 Greenbelt Metro Drive; Greenbelt, Maryland
- Owner: WMATA
- Line: Capital Subdivision
- Platforms: 1 island platform (Washington Metro); 2 side platforms (MARC)
- Tracks: 2 (Washington Metro); 4 (MARC/CSX)
- Connections: Metrobus: P12, P14, P20, P21, P32; RTA: 302/G; GoPGC: P19, P22, P2X; Shuttle-UM: 129

Construction
- Structure type: At-grade
- Parking: 3,399 spaces
- Cycle facilities: Capital Bikeshare, 60 racks, 52 lockers
- Accessible: Yes

Other information
- Station code: E10

History
- Opened: December 11, 1993
- Rebuilt: 2021

Passengers
- 2025: 3,888 (average weekday) (Metro)
- Rank: 46 of 98 (Metro)

Services
Preceding station	MARC	Following station
College Park toward Union Station	Camden Line	Muirkirk toward Camden Station
Preceding station	Washington Metro	Following station
College Park toward Huntington	Yellow Line	Terminus
College Park toward Branch Avenue	Green Line	Terminus
Former services
Preceding station	Washington Metro	Following station
College Park toward Farragut North	Green Line Commuter Shortcut	Terminus
Route map
Location

Greenbelt station is a Washington Metro and MARC station in Prince George's County, Maryland. The station is the northeastern terminus of both the Green Line and Yellow Line of the Washington Metro. MARC commuter rail trains on the Camden Line also stop at Greenbelt on a set of tracks parallel to the Metro tracks.

The station is located in the city of Greenbelt, at its northwestern border (near Berwyn Heights, Beltsville, and the northern part of College Park), off of Cherrywood Lane, near the Capital Beltway. It has a parking lot that contains more than 3,300 spaces, with convenient access both from the inner loop of the Beltway (I-95 southbound) and to the outer loop of the Beltway (I-95 northbound). It serves as a commuter station for both local residents and commuters who arrive from elsewhere — such as those who travel on the inner loop of the Beltway or south on I-95 from Baltimore. The Greenbelt Metro is the most accessible station for employees and visitors of NASA's Goddard Space Flight Center, who can connect to GoPGC's route P2X.

Between Greenbelt and College Park stations, trains pass Lake Artemesia, which was created as part of the construction of the two stations. The Greenbelt Rail Yard is also nearby, the largest storage yard in the Metrorail network.

== Station layout ==
Metro trains stop at an island platform, while MARC trains utilize two high-level side platforms. All platforms are accessible to riders with disabilities, but the MARC station is unstaffed and lacking facilities.

== History ==
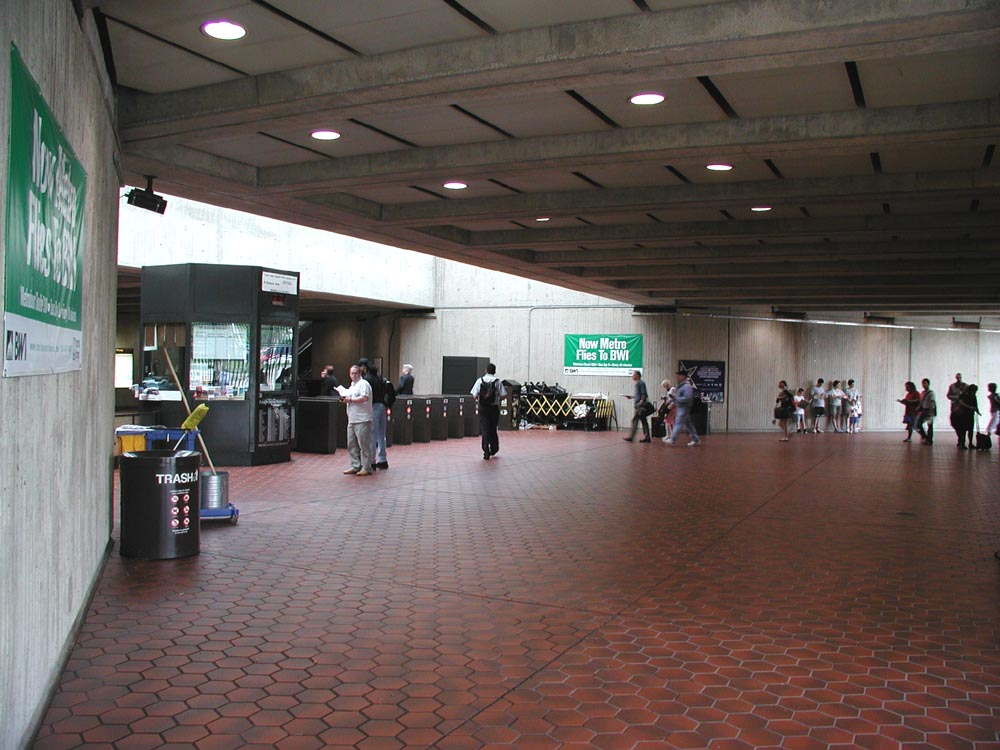
Greenbelt station mezzanine

Metro service at Greenbelt began on December 11, 1993, coinciding with the opening of three other stations in northern Prince George's County, Maryland — the completion of 7.96 miles of Green Line rail north of Fort Totten in Washington, D.C. In 1979, before opening, the name was changed from "Greenbelt Road" to just "Greenbelt".

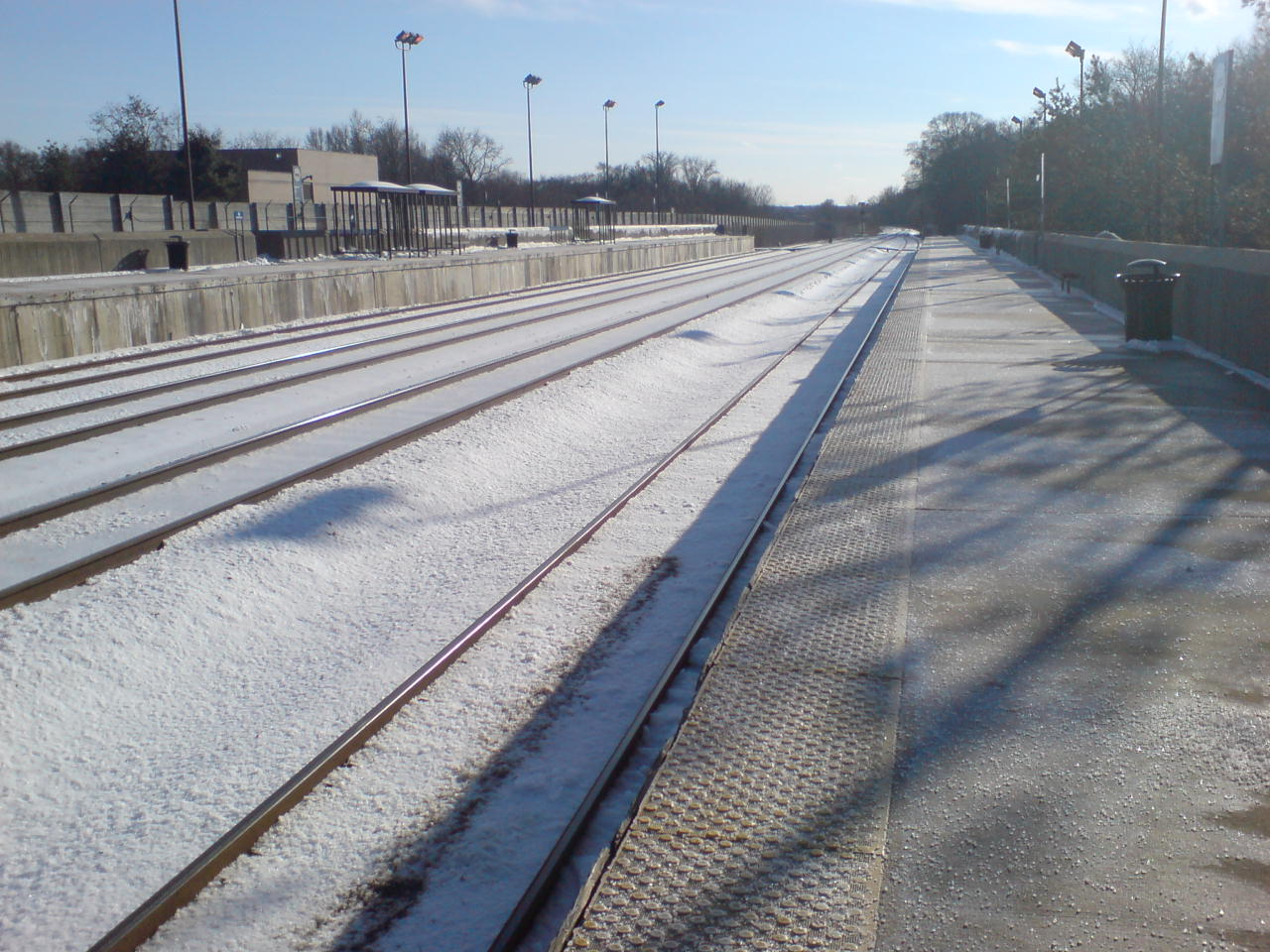
MARC train platforms at Greenbelt in February 2007 (facing south)

The Greenbelt station played a role during the January 20, 2009 presidential inauguration of Barack Obama. Prior to this date, a decision was made by Washington Metropolitan Area Transit Authority (WMATA) officials not to allow private cars to park at this station in order to allow more than 1,100 charter buses to use the parking. However, only 35 such requests were made by private bus companies, and WMATA then reversed its decision, opening up 3,400 spaces to private vehicles.

Route B30 express service to Baltimore–Washington International Airport (BWI) formerly began/ended at Greenbelt station, allowing for connections to Baltimore's regional transit services. The line used to run daily until 2017 before eliminating all weekend service. Service was suspended in March 2020 and permanently discontinued due to the COVID-19 pandemic.

On June 25, 2017, Metro's Yellow Line trains stopped serving the station due to the elimination of Rush+, which was part of major changes to the Metrorail system. On May 20, 2019, Metro announced that Yellow Line trains will be re-extended from Mount Vernon Square and Fort Totten to Greenbelt at all service hours beginning May 25, 2019.

In May 2018, Metro announced an extensive renovation of platforms at twenty stations across the system. The platforms at the Greenbelt station would be rebuilt starting on May 29, 2021 through September 6, 2021. On April 8, 2021, a COVID-19 mass vaccination site was opened in the parking lot of Greenbelt station.

On May 7, 2023, the northeastern terminus of the Yellow Line was truncated from Greenbelt to Mount Vernon Square, following its reopening after a nearly eight-month-long major rehabilitation project on its bridge over the Potomac River and its tunnel leading into L'Enfant Plaza. From July 22 to September 4, 2023, the Metro station was closed to improve rail system technologies, along with all other Green Line stations north of Fort Totten. Half of Yellow Line service was re-extended to Greenbelt on December 31, 2025.
