= Greenbelt Lines =

Daily bus routes serving the metropolitan area of Washington, D.C., United States

P20, P21
- Greenbelt Road-New Carrollton Line; Hanover Parkway-New Carrollton Line

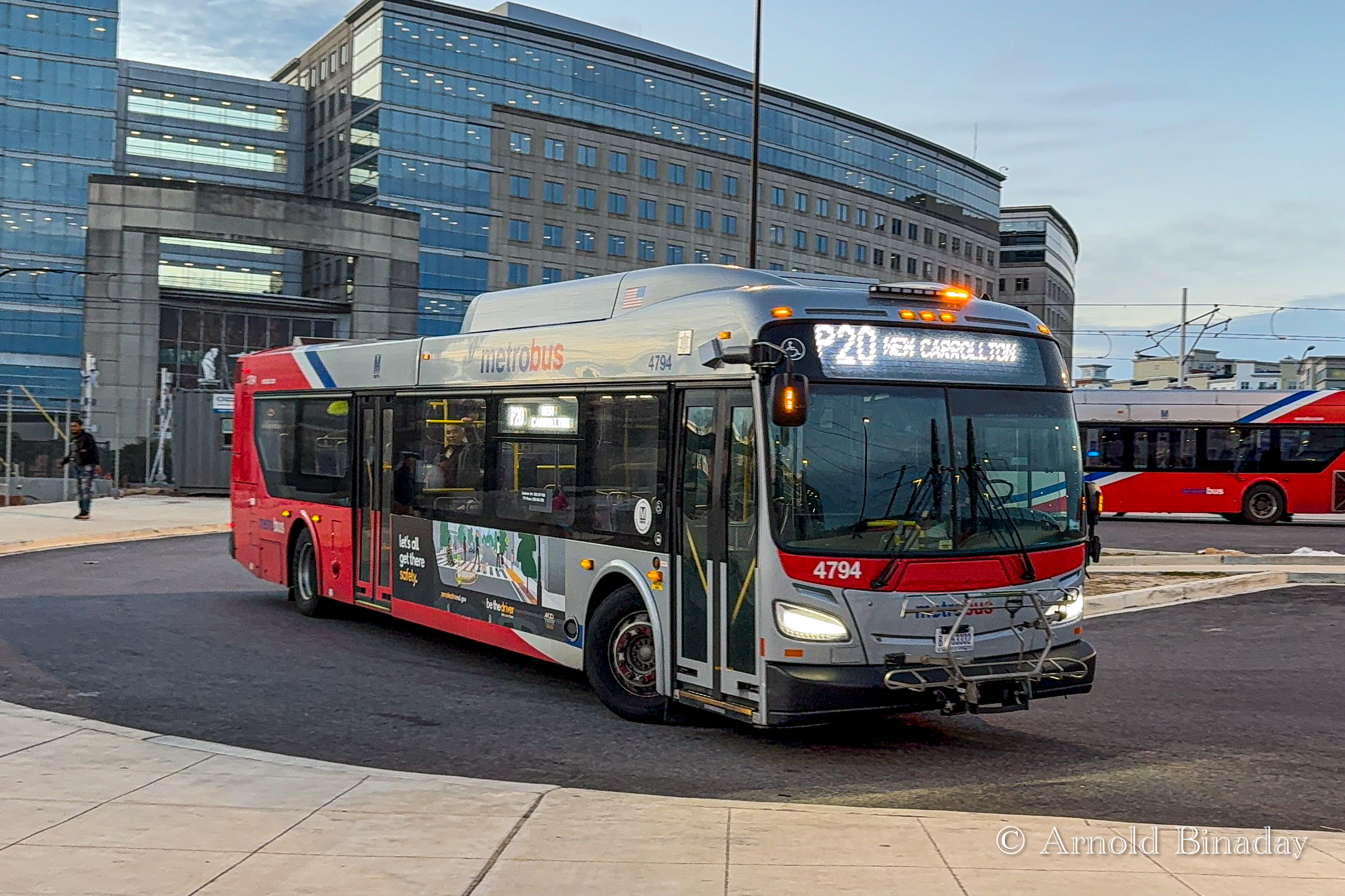
- Route P20 at New Carrollton station

Overview
- System: Metrobus
- Operator: Washington Metropolitan Area Transit Authority
- Garage: Landover
- Livery: Local
- Status: Active
- Began service: 1976
- Predecessors: C2, G12, G13, G14, G16, R11, R12, R15, T15, T16, T17

Route
- Locale: Prince George's County
- Communities served: Lanham, Seabrook, New Carrollton, Greenbelt
- Landmarks served: Greenbelt station, Beltway Plaza (P20), Old Greenbelt, Roosevelt Center, Eleanor Roosevelt High School, Goddard Space Flight Center (P20), Goddard Corporate Park (P20), Doctors Community Hospital (P21), New Carrollton station
- Start: Greenbelt station
- Via: Cherrywood Lane, Greenbelt Road (P20), Ridge Road (P21), Lanham Severn Road (P20), Princess Garden Parkway (P21), Annapolis Road
- End: New Carrollton station

Service
- Level: Daily
- Frequency: 30 minutes
- Weekend frequency: 30-60 Minutes
- Operates: 5:00 AM – 12:00 AM
- Ridership: 362,694 (G12, FY 2025); 736,680 (G14, FY 2025)
- Transfers: SmarTrip only
- Timetable: Greenbelt Road-New Carrollton Line; Hanover Parkway-New Carrollton Line

The Greenbelt Lines designated as the Greenbelt Road-New Carrollton Line on Route P20, and Hanover Parkway-New Carrollton Line on Route P21, are daily bus routes operated by the Washington Metropolitan Area Transit Authority between Greenbelt station of the Green and Yellow Lines of Washington Metro and New Carrollton station of the Orange and Silver Lines of the Washington Metro. Both routes provides service between New Carrollton and Greenbelt connecting travelers to both communities without having to enter Washington, D.C. by train.

== Route description and service ==
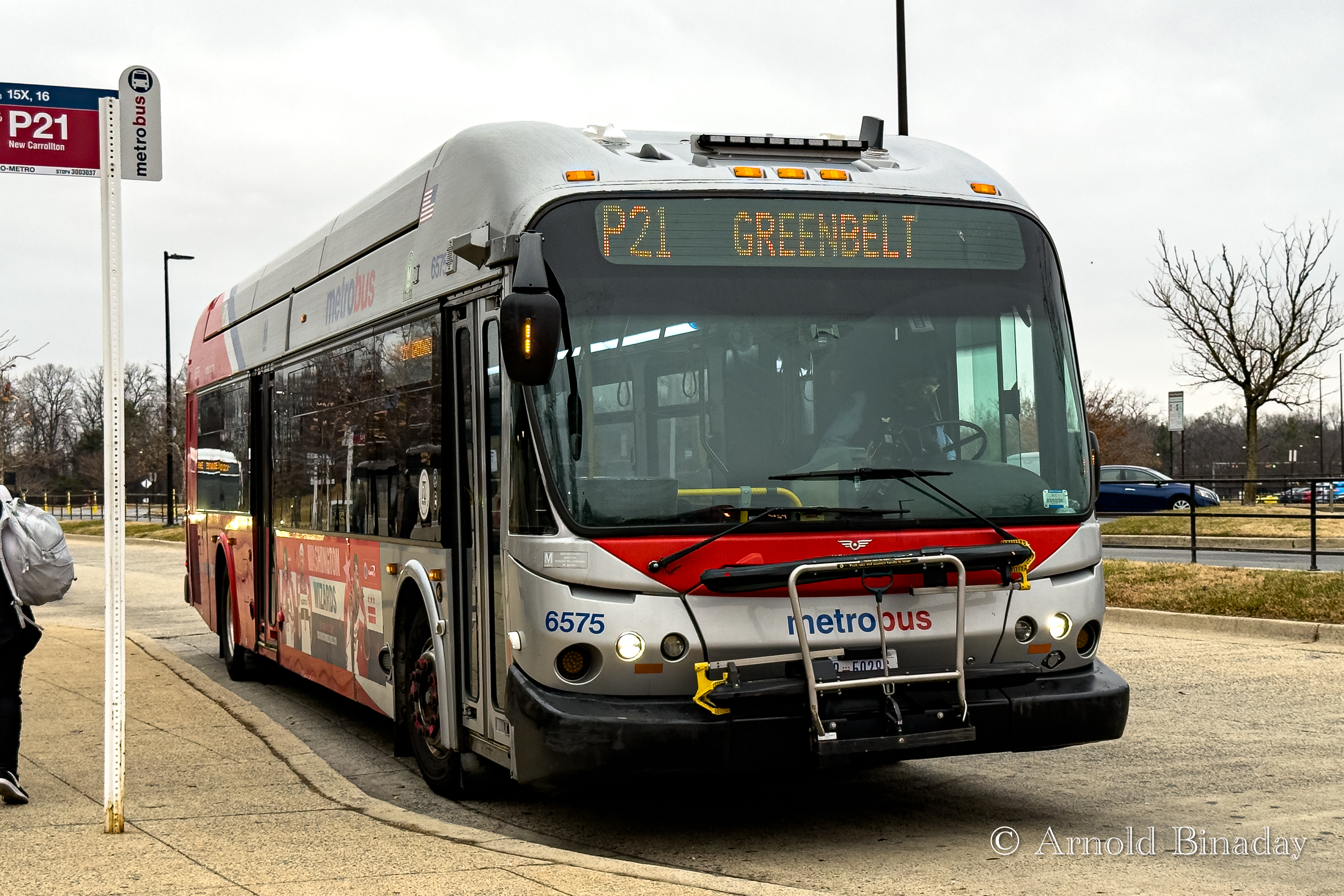
Route P21 at Greenbelt station

Routes P20 and P21 operate daily between Greenbelt station and New Carrollton station. The route operates between 5:00 am and 12:00 am on weekdays and between 6:00 am and 10:00 pm on the weekends. Route P20 trips skip the Beltway Plaza Mall loop on weekdays only before 7:45 am. Both routes operates every 30 minutes weekdays, with the P20 operating every 30 minutes on weekends and the P21 operating every 60 minutes on weekends. Both routes replaced the previous G12 and G14 on June 29, 2025.

Both routes operate out of Landover division.

=== Former G12 stops ===
Bus stop	Direction	Connections
Prince George's County, Maryland
Greenbelt station Bus Bay E	Westbound station, Eastbound terminal	Metrobus: 89M, C2, G14, R12; RTA: 302/G; TheBus: 11, 15X, 16; Shuttle-UM: 129; BoltBus; Washington Metro: MARC: Camden Line
Greenbelt Metro Drive / Cherrywood Lane	Bidirectional	Metrobus: 89M, C2, G14, R12; RTA: 302/G; TheBus: 11, 15, 16; Shuttle-UM: 129
Cherrywood Lane / Ivy Lane	Bidirectional	Metrobus: 89M; RTA: 302/G TheBus: 11; Shuttle-UM
Ivy Lane / #6400	Bidirectional	Metrobus: 89M; TheBus: 11
Ivy Lane / Greenbelt Marriott	Bidirectional	Metrobus: 89M; TheBus: 11
Ivy Lane / Turner Place	Bidirectional	Metrobus: 89M; TheBus: 11
Kenilworth Avenue / Crescent Road	Westbound	Metrobus: 87; TheBus: 11
Ivy Lane / Ridge Road	Bidirectional	Shuttle-UM
Ivy Lane / Lastner Lane	Bidirectional	Shuttle-UM
Lastner Lane / Julien Court	Bidirectional	Shuttle-UM
Ridge Road / #73 Court	Bidirectional	
Ridge Road / Research Road	Bidirectional	
Ridge Road / Laurel Hill Road	Bidirectional	
Ridge Road / #57-#58 Road	Bidirectional	
Ridge Road / Plateau Place	Bidirectional	
Ridge Road / Northway	Bidirectional	
Ridge Road / Eastway	Bidirectional	
Ridge Road / #35-#38 Court	Bidirectional	
Ridge Road / Hamilton Place	Bidirectional	
Ridge Road / Gardenway	Bidirectional	Metrobus: G14
Crescent Road / Gardenway	Bidirectional	Metrobus: G14; TheBus: 11
Southway / Crescent Road	Bidirectional	Metrobus: G14; TheBus: 11
Ridge Road / 12 Court	Bidirectional	Metrobus: G14
Westway / Ridge Road	Bidirectional	Metrobus: G14
Lakeside Drive / Westway	Bidirectional	Metrobus: G14
Lakeside Drive / Lakecrest Drive	Bidirectional	Metrobus: G14
Lakeside Drive / Lakecrest Circle	Westbound	Metrobus: G14
Lakeside Drive / American Legion Drive	Eastbound	Metrobus: G14
Greenbelt Road / Greenway Shopping Center	Bidirectional	Metrobus: G14; TheBus: 11, 15X, 16; Shuttle-UM
Hanover Parkway / Greenbelt Road	Bidirectional	TheBus: 11 (Westbound only); Shuttle-UM
Hanover Parkway / #7722	Bidirectional	TheBus: 11 (Westbound only); Shuttle-UM
Hanover Parkway / #7800	Bidirectional	TheBus: 11 (Westbound only); Shuttle-UM
Hanover Parkway / Mandan Road	Bidirectional	TheBus: 11 (Westbound only); Shuttle-UM
Mandan Road / #7648-#7676	Bidirectional	TheBus: 11 (Westbound only); Shuttle-UM
Mandan Road / #7516-#7546	Bidirectional	TheBus: 11 (Westbound only); Shuttle-UM
Mandan Road / #7501-#7509	Bidirectional	TheBus: 11 (Westbound only); Shuttle-UM
Mandan Road / Court #7	Eastbound	Shuttle-UM
Mandan Road / Canning Terrace	Westbound	TheBus: 11; Shuttle-UM
Ora Glen Drive / Mandan Road	Bidirectional	TheBus: 11 (Westbound only); Shuttle-UM
Ora Glen Drive / Morrison Drive	Bidirectional	TheBus: 11 (Westbound only); Shuttle-UM
Ora Glen Drive / Wintergreen Circle	Eastbound	
Ora Glen Drive / Greenbrook Drive	Westbound	
Ora Glen Drive / Ora Court	Eastbound	
Ora Glen Drive / South Ora Court	Westbound	
Handover Parkway / Greenway Center Drive	Eastbound	TheBus: 11, 16
Hanover Parkway / Ora Glen Drive	Eastbound	TheBus: 16
Hanover Parkway / Handover Drive	Bidirectional	TheBus: 11 (Eastbound only), 16
Hanover Parkway / Greenbrook Drive	Bidirectional	TheBus: 16
Hanover Parkway / Hunting Ridge	Bidirectional	TheBus: 16
Hanover Parkway / Village Park Drive	Bidirectional	TheBus: 16
Hanover Parkway / Megan Lane	Bidirectional	TheBus: 16
Hanover Parkway / Spring Manor Drive	Bidirectional	TheBus: 16
Hanover Parkway / Megan Lane	Bidirectional	TheBus: 16
Hanover Parkway / Green Crescent Court	Bidirectional	TheBus: 16
Doctors Community Hospital Bus Shelter	Bidirectional	TheBus: 16
Princess Garden Parkway / Greenfield Drive	Eastbound	
Princess Garden Parkway / Tiffany Lane	Westbound	
Princess Garden Parkway / Greenfield Drive	Eastbound	
Princess Garden Parkway / #6512	Bidirectional	
Princess Garden Parkway / Woodburn Court	Bidirectional	
Princess Garden Parkway / Hickory Hill Avenue	Bidirectional	
Princess Garden Parkway / City Hall	Bidirectional	
Princess Garden Parkway / Annapolis Road	Bidirectional	Metrobus: B24, B27, F13, G14
Annapolis Road / Princess Garden Parkway	Westbound	Metrobus: B24, B27, F13, G14
Annapolis Road / 85th Avenue	Bidirectional	Metrobus: B24, B27, F13, G14
Annapolis Road / Riverdale Road	Bidirectional	Metrobus: B24, B27, F4 (Eastbound only), F13, G14
Annapolis Road / #7990	Bidirectional	Metrobus: B24, B27, F4, F13, G14
Annapolis Road / West Lanham Drive	Bidirectional	Metrobus: B24, B27, F4, F13, G14
Harkins Road / Annapolis Road	Bidirectional	Metrobus: B24, B27, F4, F6, F13, G14, T18
Harkins Road / Sherwood Street	Bidirectional	Metrobus: B24, B27, F4, F6, F13, G14, T18
Harkins Road / Ellin Road	Bidirectional	Metrobus: B24, B27, F4, F6, F13, G14, T18
New Carrollton station Bus Bay J	Westbound terminal Eastbound station	Metrobus: A12, B21, B22, B24, B27, F4, F6, F12, F13, F14, G14, T14, T18; MTA Maryland Commuter Bus; TheBus: 15X, 16, 21, 21X; Greyhound; Peter Pan Bus Lines; Washington Metro: MARC: Penn Line; Amtrak: Northeast Regional, Palmetto, Vermonter; MTA: Purple Line (Planned)

=== Former G14 stops ===
Bus stop	Direction	Connections
Prince George's County, Maryland
Greenbelt station Bus Bay F	Westbound station, Eastbound terminal	Metrobus: 89M, C2, G12, R12; RTA: 302/G; TheBus: 11, 15X, 16; Shuttle-UM: 129; BoltBus; Washington Metro: MARC: Camden Line
Greenbelt Metro Drive / Cherrywood Lane	Bidirectional	Metrobus: 89M, C2, G12, R12; RTA: 302/G; TheBus: 11, 15, 16; Shuttle-UM: 129
Cherrywood Lane / Springhill Drive	Bidirectional	Metrobus: C2, R12; RTA: 302/G; TheBus: 16
Cherrywood Lane / Cherrywood Court	Westbound	Metrobus: C2; RTA: 302/G
Cherrywood Lane / Breezewood Drive	Westbound	Metrobus: C2; RTA: 302/G
Cherrywood Lane / #5510	Bidirectional	Metrobus: C2, R12; RTA: 302/G; TheBus: 16
Greenbelt Road / Cherrywood Lane	Westbound	Metrobus: R12; RTA: 302/G
Beltway Plaza / Cunningham Drive Entrance	Bidirectional	Metrobus: R12
Beltway Plaza / Main Entrance	Bidirectional	Metrobus: R12
Beltway Plaza / Cunningham Drive Exit	Bidirectional	Metrobus: R12
Greenbelt Road / 63rd Avenue	Bidirectional	Metrobus: R12; RTA: 302/G
Greenbelt Road / Edmonston Road	Bidirectional	Metrobus: R12; RTA: 302/G
Greenbelt Road / Walker Drive	Bidirectional	TheBus: 16
Lakeside Drive / American Legion Drive	Eastbound	Metrobus: G12
Lakeside Drive / Lakecrest Circle	Westbound	Metrobus: G12
Lakeside Drive / Lakecrest Drive	Bidirectional	Metrobus: G12
Lakeside Drive / Westway	Bidirectional	Metrobus: G12
Westway / Ridge Road	Bidirectional	Metrobus: G12
Ridge Road / 12 Court	Bidirectional	Metrobus: G12
Ridge Road / 18 Court	Eastbound	
Ridge Road / 21 Court	Bidirectional	
Ridge Road / Gardenway	Bidirectional	Metrobus: G12
Crescent Road / Gardenway	Bidirectional	Metrobus: G12; TheBus: 11
Southway / Crescent Road	Bidirectional	Metrobus: G12; TheBus: 11
Southway / Ridge Road	Eastbound	TheBus: 11
Southway / #7 Court	Westbound	TheBus: 11
Southway / #10 Court	Eastbound	TheBus: 11
Southway / #11 Court	Westbound	TheBus: 11
Greenbelt Road / Greenway Shopping Center	Bidirectional	Metrobus: G12; TheBus: 11, 15X, 16; Shuttle-UM
Greenbelt Road / Handover Parkway	Bidirectional	
Greenbelt Road / Frankfort Drive	Bidirectional	
Greenbelt Road / Mandan Road	Bidirectional	
Greenbelt Road / Chelsea Road Condominium	Bidirectional	
Greenbelt Road / Gates of Cipriano Condos	Eastbound	
Greenbelt Road / Goddard Road	Bidirectional	TheBus: 15X
Greenbelt Road / Vandenberg Court	Bidirectional	
Greenbelt Road / Good Luck Road	Bidirectional	
Greenbelt Road / Aerospace Road	Bidirectional	
Greenbelt Road / Woodland Landing Apartments	Bidirectional	
Greenbelt Road / Forbes Boulevard	Bidirectional	
Mission Drive / Greenbelt Road	Bidirectional	
Mission Drive / Goddard Corporate Park	Bidirectional	
Mission Drive / Greenbelt Road	Bidirectional	
Greenbelt Road / Forbes Boulevard	Bidirectional	
Greenbelt Road / Woodland Landing Apartments	Bidirectional	
Greenbelt Road / Aerospace Road	Bidirectional	
Good Luck Road / Greenbelt Road	Bidirectional	
Good Luck Road / Forest Lake Apartments	Bidirectional	
Good Luck Road / Palamar Drive	Bidirectional	
Good Luck Road / Elvis Lane	Bidirectional	
Good Luck Road / 97th Place	Bidirectional	
Good Luck Road / 96th Avenue	Bidirectional	
Good Luck Road / Presley Road	Bidirectional	
Good Luck Road / 94th Avenue	Bidirectional	
Good Luck Road / Cipriano Road	Westbound	
Cipriano Road / Tuckerman Street	Bidirectional	
Cipriano Road / Wellington Place	Bidirectional	
Cipriano Road / 3rd Street	Bidirectional	
Cipriano Road / Hickory Hill Avenue	Eastbound	
Cipriano Road / 5th Street	Eastbound	
Cipriano Road / Spring Avenue	Eastbound	
Cipriano Road / 7th Street	Eastbound	
Cipriano Road / 10th Street	Bidirectional	
Lanham Severn Road / Cipriano Road	Bidirectional	Metrobus: B27
Annapolis Road / Princess Garden Parkway	Westbound	Metrobus: B24, B27, F13, G12
Annapolis Road / 85th Avenue	Bidirectional	Metrobus: B24, B27, F13, G12
Annapolis Road / Riverdale Road	Bidirectional	Metrobus: B24, B27, F4 (Eastbound only), F13, G12
Annapolis Road / #7990	Bidirectional	Metrobus: B24, B27, F4, F13, G12
Annapolis Road / West Lanham Drive	Bidirectional	Metrobus: B24, B27, F4, F13, G12
Harkins Road / Annapolis Road	Bidirectional	Metrobus: B24, B27, F4, F6, F13, G12, T18
Harkins Road / Sherwood Street	Bidirectional	Metrobus: B24, B27, F4, F6, F13, G12, T18
Harkins Road / Ellin Road	Bidirectional	Metrobus: B24, B27, F4, F6, F13, G12, T18
New Carrollton station Bus Bay J	Westbound terminal Eastbound station	Metrobus: 87, A12, B21, B22, B24, B27, F4, F6, F12, F13, F14, G12, T14, T18; MTA Maryland Commuter Bus; TheBus: 15X, 16, 21, 21X; Greyhound; Peter Pan Bus Lines; Washington Metro: MARC: Penn Line; Amtrak: Northeast Regional, Palmetto, Vermonter; MTA: Purple Line (Planned)

== History ==
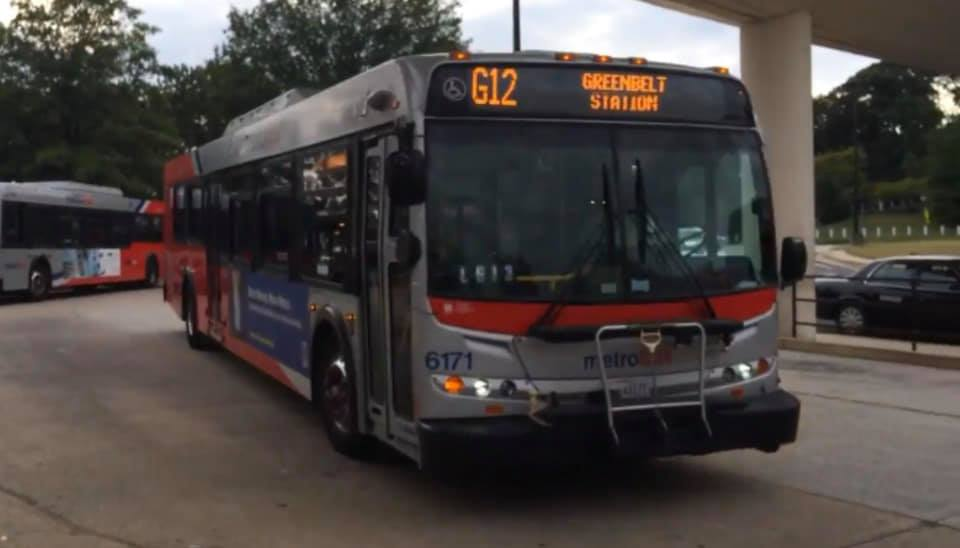
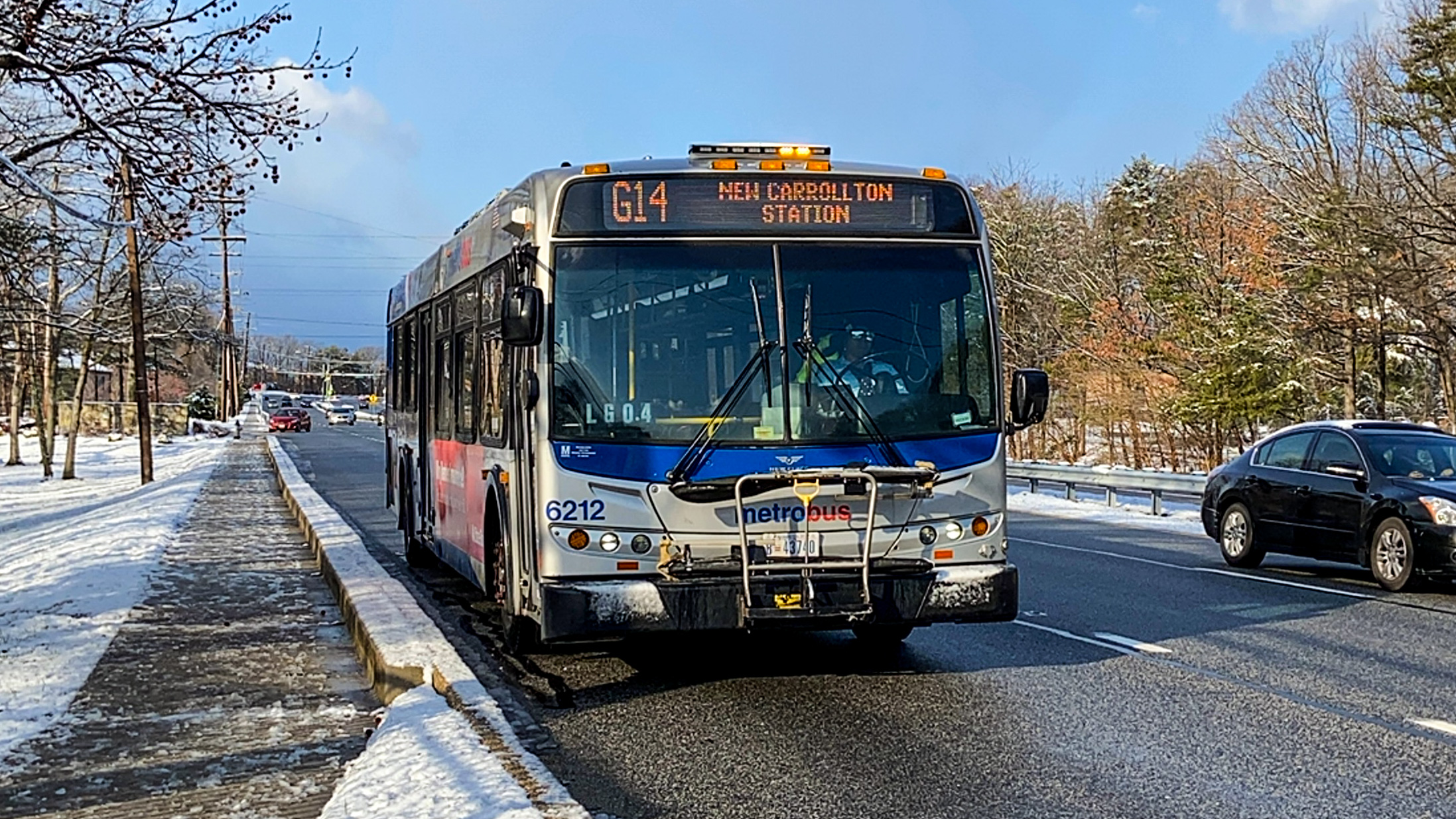
Former Routes G12 and G14

The Greenbelt–New Carrollton Line was run by two different Metrobus routes from 1978 until 1993. The local routes were operated by routes T15, T16, and T17 from 1976 until 2010 while the Express routes were operated by the "Greenbelt-New Carrollton Express Line" operated by routes R11 and R15. After 1993, the line was solely operated by routes T15, T16, and T17. After the mid 2000s, routes T16 and T17 continued.

=== R11, R15 ===
Routes R11 and R15 operated express routes during peak hours only between 1978 and 1993. Both routes operated during rush hours only.

==== Greenbelt–New Carrollton Express Line ====
Routes R11 and R15 originally began as Street Car Lines operating between Farragut Square and Springhill Lake Apartment Complex when they were a part of the Kenilworth Avenue Line. In 1973, both routes R11 and R15 became Metrobus routes along with routes R12, R13, and R14. On July 18, 1977, routes R11 and R15 were shorten to Stadium–Armory station. Early morning Saturday service was discontinued on September 26, 1977 being replaced with the Orange and Blue Lines with peak hour trips not being affected.

On December 3, 1978, routes R11 and R15 were separated from the Kenilworth Avenue Line and were created as the "Greenbelt-New Carrollton Express Line" which would provide express service between Greenbelt and New Carrollton station. Route R11 would operate between Beltway Plaza Mall and New Carrollton station while route R15 would operate between Greenbelt Center and New Carrollton station. Both routes would primarily run along Greenbelt Road, Cherrywood Lane, Kenilworth Avenue, the Capital Beltway, and John Hanson Highway.

On December 11, 1993, routes R11 and R15 were discontinued when the Green Line portion between Greenbelt station and Fort Totten station opened and replaced by routes R12, T15, T16, and T17.

=== T15, T16, T17 ===
Route T16 originally operated as part of the Bowie-Belair Line with route T14 in the 1980s.

Routes T15, T16 and T17 were the original Greenbelt–New Carrollton Line which was known as the Greenbelt Line before the G12, G13, G14, and G16. The T16 ran Mondays and Saturdays while the T17 only had rush-hour service. Both buses ran at different times and the T15 and T17 only served Goddard Corporate Park. Route T15 would also loop around Edmonston Road, Cherrywood Lane, and Ivy Lane serving Greenbelt Marriott. All routes operated on 60 minute headways with routes T15 and T17 operating at a combined 30 minute frequency.

=== History ===
Routes T16 and T17 originally operated all the way between Rhode Island Avenue–Brentwood station and Beltway Plaza Mall, via New Carrollton and Capital Plaza Mall, between March 27, 1976 and December 3, 1978 when both routes were truncated to only operate between Beltway Plaza and New Carrollton station. Route T15 originally operated as the Bowie–Belair Shuttle before being replaced by route T12 on December 3, 1978. Routes T15 also originally served Crofton until being replaced by the B29 and B31 around the early 1990s.

On December 11, 1993, routes T16, and T17 were extended from Beltway Plaza Mall to Greenbelt station in order to provide Greenbelt residents access to the Washington Metro. T15 also joined the T16 and T17 on December 11, 1993 when Greenbelt station opened and only operated during weekday peak hours via Cherrywood Lane and Ivy Lane.

On June 30, 2002, routes T15, T16, and T17 routing were changed where buses will operate via Soil Conservation Road to the NASA visitors center outside the security fence at Goddard Space Flight Center with customers can get off the bus at new bus stops along Greenbelt Road near the main gate. On weekends, buses will bypass the center.

On September 29, 2002, route T15 was discontinued and replaced by routes R12, T16, and T17 since almost all of its routing overlapped the three routes between Greenbelt and New Carrollton station. Route T17 began operating every 30 minutes to fulfill T15 service. Routes T16 and T17 were also rerouted inside Goddard Space Flight Center to no longer operate along Explorer Road and Goddard Road and instead operate via Icesat Road and the visitor center only.

On March 27, 2005, service to Goddard Space Flight Center visitors center resumed on Saturdays as the visitors center reopened on Saturday. The route previously only served the loop on weekdays only.

=== Restructuring service in Greenbelt ===
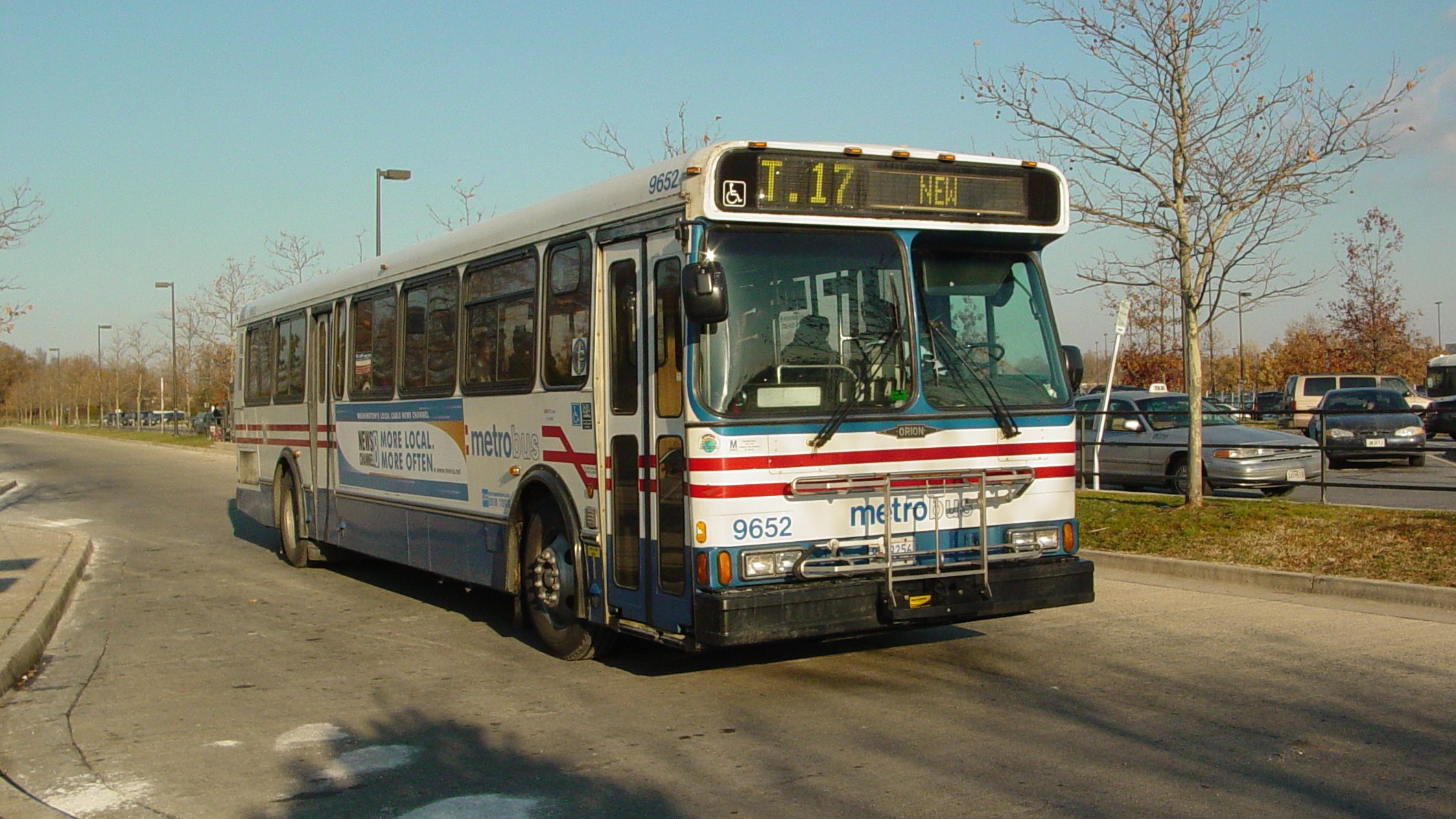
Route T17 at Greenbelt station

Bus service in Greenbelt, Maryland was controversial over the years due to lack of services and long routes. Proposal were mentioned as part of Metro's systemwide bus and rail cuts proposed during a budget crisis in spring of 2010. The Metro Board then took all service cuts off the table before approving the budget for that fiscal year. Alterations to Greenbelt's bus service came back up at the request of Greenbelt and Prince George's County.

The Greenbelt City Council supported the changes mainly because they feared that if changes were not made, Greenbelt would be at the top of the list for service reductions during the next budget cycle. WMATA staff wanted to reconstructive the routes because they felt that resources could be used more efficiently. WMATA estimates that proposed changes will save about $563,000 per year in operating costs. At the time of the announcement, only the 81 (on Sundays only), R3, C2, R12, and the T16 and T17 were running into Greenbelt along with TheBus 11, 15, 15X, and 16. The C2, R12, T16, and T17 and TheBus routes were the only routes that operates into Greenbelt as the 81, and R3 only operated to Greenbelt station.

Routes T16 and T17 ran very long routes as all the landmarks were combined into one long route and the T17 was only rerouted to service Goddard Corporate Park during peak hours. This meant inconsistent scheduling to the T16 and T17 around its path. T16 operates Monday through Saturday up until 9:00 PM with no peak-hour service. Route T17 also only operates during the weekday peak-hours. Route R12 was an extremely long route experiencing bus bunching and scheduling problems and route C2 had to backtrack to serve Greenbelt station. There is no Sunday service on any route at the time except route 81 which only operates to Greenbelt station and heads to Cherry Hill or Rhode Island Avenue–Brentwood station and route R3 was shorten to operate between Fort Totten station and Prince George's Plaza (now Hyattsville Crossing) station on weekends only having no Greenbelt service during those times.

==== April 2010 proposals ====
In April 2010, proposals were set for brand new routes T12 and T14 to join the T16 and eliminate the T17. It sets as the following:

- Route T12 would operate on a combination of the C2 and R12 routing as both routes were proposed to be shorten to terminate at Greenbelt station. The T12 would operate between Greenbelt and New Carrollton station but would not enter the Beltway Plaza Mall loop. The route would also turn on Handover Parkway and serve Doctor's Community Hospital.
- Route T14 would operate between Beltway Plaza and Goddard Corporate Park only via Greenbelt station, Franklin Park, and Old Greenbelt replacing route R12 routing in Greenbelt and completely replacing route T17. The route would also turn on Greenbelt and Handover Parkway and run along Ora Glen Drive. It'll be the only service to operate the Beltway Plaza loop. However the Goddard Space Flight Center visitors center loop will be eliminated.
- Route T16 would operate via the C2 routing between Greenbelt station and Greenbelt Center, and then the current routing between Greenbelt Center and New Carrollton station but will discontinue service to Doctors Community Hospital being replaced by the T12, and having Old Greenbelt and Beltway Plaza service replaced by route T14. Service along Kenilworth Avenue and to the Goddard Space Flight Center visitors center loop would also be eliminated.
- Route T17 would be eliminated and replaced by a combination of routes T12, T14, and T16.

This would lead to the following reductions of services on already running routes:

- Route C2 would end at Greenbelt station discontinuing service between Greenbelt station to Greenbelt Center, being replaced by Routes T12 and T16. This would eliminate direct service to University of Maryland and Wheaton station in Old Greenbelt and Greenbelt Center.
- Route R3 would be discontinued completely and be replaced by a combination of routes C2, F6, R2.
- Route R12 would also end at Greenbelt with service discontinuing to New Carrollton being replaced by Routes T12 and T14. This would eliminate direct service to New Carrollton along the R12 routing in Old Greenbelt as the proposed T14 would end at Goddard Corporate Park only.

==== May 2010 proposals ====
On May 8, 2010, WMATA released another proposal for simplified Greenbelt service which includes brand new routes G12, G14, and G16 instead of routes T12, T14, and T16. It was set as the following:

- Route G12 would operate along route R12's service along the Old Greenbelt neighborhood with a reroute along Lastner Lane and Ridge Road instead of operating along Crescent Road, Hillside Road, and Laurel Hill Road and an option for the route to remain on the R12 and T16 regular routing. The G12 would also have service through the University Square apartments off Westway. It would also turn along Greenbelt and Mandan Road and run along Ora Glen Drive replacing route R12 service and would also serve Doctor's Community Hospital. The route would be a similar route to route T14 but would instead operate between Greenbelt station and New Carrollton station instead of Beltway Plaza and Goddard Corporate Park via Greenbelt. Parts along Crescent Road, Hillside Road, and Laurel Hill Road would be replaced by a rerouted TheBus Route 11.
- Route G14 would operate along a combination of routes C2, R12, T16, and T17 operating on route C2's routing between Greenbelt station and Greenbelt Center via Franklin Park, and routes T16 and T17 routing between Greenbelt Center and New Carrollton station. It would be the only route to operate via Goddard Corporate Park and would only operate weekdays only until 6:00 pm. However the Goddard Space Flight Center visitors center loop, service along Kenilworth Avenue, Old Greenbelt service, and service to Doctor's Community Hospital will be eliminated.
- Route G16 would operate the same pathway as route G14 but would skip Goddard Corporate Park and operate during late nights after 6:00 pm and Saturday only.
- Route C2 would still end at Greenbelt station discontinuing service to Greenbelt Center being replaced by Route G14.
- Route R3 was removed from the proposals and would not be discontinued.
- Route R12 would discontinue service along Franklin Park being replaced by routes G14 and G16.

==== September 2010 proposals ====
In September 2010, WMATA released the final proposal for future Greenbelt service along with Prince George's County TheBus in October 2010. The WMATA changes were similar to the May 8 proposal but with some changes.

- Route G12 would be rerouted along Lastner Lane and Ridge Road, and would operate along Lakecrest Drive, Westway and Lakeside Drive similar to route G14 and G16 but going the opposite direction (which means stops route G14 go along that goes towards New Carrollton station would instead operate to Greenbelt station for route G12 and vice versa) and turn onto Greenbelt and Lakecrest Drive. It would also instead serve route T16 and T17 routing along Handover Parkway and Mandan Road plus run along Ora Glen Drive. Service along Southway would be run by routes G14 and G16. Service along Crescent Road, Hillside Road, and Laurel Hill Road would be replaced by a rerouted TheBus Route 11.
- Routes G14 and G16 would remain along Greenbelt Road and not run along Handover Parkway and Mandan Road with that part being run by route G12. Routes G14 and G16 would also not serve Franklin Park with route R12 running along it instead. But the G14 and G16 would serve the Beltway Plaza Mall loop.
- A new "Time Transfer" were to be added at Greenbelt Center for routes G12, G14, and G16.
- Route R12 would serve Franklin Park and the Beltway Plaza loop.
- Route C2 would still end at Greenbelt station discontinuing service to Greenbelt Center.
- TheBus route 11 would be extended into the Old Greenbelt Neighborhood running on the former route R12, T16, and T17 routes and operate as a loop.
- TheBus Route 15 would be eliminated and replaced with a combinations of routes G14, G16, TheBus and routes 11 and 16.

The Metro Board was to vote on the changes on September 30, 2010. If the vote gets approved, the changes will begin as early as December.

=== Restructuring ===
In late 2010 in part of a reconstructing attempt, WMATA announced changes to bus lines in Greenbelt that will affect the current route T16 and T17 along with routes C2, and R12 beginning on December 19, 2010.

Routes T16 and T17 were eliminated and replaced by routes G12, G13, G14, and G16 being renamed to the Greenbelt–New Carrollton Line. Routes G13, G14, and G16 would replace routes C2, T16 and T17 while route G12 would replace route R12's routing between Greenbelt and New Carrollton stations. While both routes T16 and T17 served Doctors Community Hospital, routes G13, G14, and G16 would not serve the hospital as route G12 will serve the hospital instead as the route was more closer to the hospital than the G13, G14, and G16. Also, routes G13 and G14 would serve Goddard Corporate Park on weekdays at all times while route G16 would not serve the park. The new Greenbelt Line would be the same proposal from the September 2010 proposal.

Route G12 would run between Monday and Saturday (the same as the T16), the G13 was a morning rush-hour service only that doesn't serve Beltway Plaza Mall and has the same routing as the G14, the G14 only ran Monday and Friday from 8:00 AM to 6:00 PM running via Goddard Corporate Park, and the G16 ran Weekday late nights after 6:00 PM and Saturday service only skipping Goddard Corporate Park. Most of the former C2, R12, T16, T17 routing was absorbed into the new G12, G13, G14, and G16.

A new "Timed transfer" was also introduced with the G12, G13, G14, and G16 routing. Buses will be scheduled to meet each other at Old Greenbelt. It works as an eastbound/westbound bus on one route arrives at the same time as an eastbound/westbound bus on the other route. Buses will have a scheduled wait of about 5 minutes to allow for the vagaries of traffic. For example, someone in the northern part of Old Greenbelt (the G12) will be able to reach Goddard Corporate Park (G13/G14) by transferring at Greenbelt Center. Similarly, someone at Beltway Plaza (G13/G14/16) can reach Roosevelt High or Doctors Community Hospital (G12) the same way.

Route C2 was cutback to end at Greenbelt station with service between the station and Greenbelt Center being replaced by routes G13, G14, and G16. Route R12 was split into two routes. The R12 portion between Greenbelt and New Carrollton station was replaced by the G12 while diverting into Doctors Community Hospital and operating along Ridge Road, Ivy Lane, and Lastner Lane. TheBus route 11 replaced parts of the T16, T17, and R12 along Hillside Road, Laurel Hill Road, and the portion of Crescent Road between Hillside Road and Lastner Lane which was extended as a loop running from Greenbelt station and a loop along Handover Parkway Mandan Road and Ora Glen Drive in the Westbound Direction. TheBus route 15 was also discontinued and replaced by routes G12, G13, G14, G16 and TheBus routes 11, and 16.

All changes went into effect on December 19, 2010 with service beginning the next day as there was no Sunday service on any route at the time.

=== Later Changes ===
On June 26, 2011, routes G13 and G14 were rerouted in Goddard Corporate Park to operates along Forbes Boulevard and Aerospace Road then return to Greenbelt Road due to provide service closer to an office building at 7700 Hubble Drive housing for NASA and NOAA employees.

During WMATA's FY2016 budget, WMATA proposed to eliminate routes G13 and G16 and replace them with route G14. All G13 and G16 trips will be renamed route G14. Service along Aerospace Road and Forbes Boulevard would be discontinued due to low ridership for route G14. Also, new Sunday service will be added to both G12 and G14. The reasons for the proposed changes was simplify the Greenbelt–New Carrollton Line, very few people use stops on Aerospace Road, extending all G16 trips to Goddard Corporate Park will provide better service to the apartments on the south side of Greenbelt Road (east of Good Luck Road) and to Eastgate Shopping Center and the route has many riders during the week and Saturday which should have Sunday service under WMATA standards. Service to Goddard Corporate Park would become more frequent and would be daily instead of having a reduced service during the week.

On March 27, 2016, routes G13 and G16 were discontinued by WMATA and replaced by the G14 which added weekend service. The G14 would absorb the G13's Beltway Plaza Mall skip in the morning before 7:30 AM and serve Goddard Corporate Park at all times. Route G14 would also discontinue service along Forbes Boulevard and Aerospace Road due to low ridership. With the G14 adding full daily service, this also added additional service after 6:00 pm on weekdays and weekend service for residents in Goddard Corporate Park on the former T17 routing. The G12 and G14 also added Sunday service for the first time which was not available to the T16 and T17, and gives Greenbelt residents daily service inside Greenbelt.

In 2017, WMATA proposed to revise the G12 and G14 schedule which would eliminate the Time Transfer at Roosevelt Center. The G12 and G14 are scheduled to depart from both Greenbelt and New Carrollton within a few minutes of each other and are timed to meet at Roosevelt Center. WMATA proposed to stagger the departure times because staggering departures at the stations could provide more departure options to customers travelling to and from stops served by both routes, including at Roosevelt Center in Greenbelt, improving the combined frequency of service from approximately every 30 and 60 minutes to every 15 and 30 minutes at stops served by both routes G12 and G14 and would improve service operations and reduce bus congestion at the New Carrollton, where routes G12 and G14 share a bus bay according to WMATA. An example of the proposed scenario goes as follows:

	Current departure from New Carrollton	Proposed departure Example from New Carrollton
Weekday peak hours
G14	6:00 AM	6:00 AM
G12	6:02 AM	6:15 AM
G14	6:30 AM	6:30 AM
G12	6:32 AM	6:45 AM
G14	7:00 AM	7:00 AM
G12	7:02 AM	7:15 AM
Weekday midday and weekends
G14	11:30 AM	11:30 AM
G12	11:32 AM	11:45 AM
G14	12:30 PM	12:30 PM
G12	12:32 PM	12:45 PM

Performance measures according to WMATA go as the following as of the FY2016 budget:

Performance measures	Routes G12, G14	WMATA Guideline	Pass/Fail
Average Weekday Riders	2,966	432	Pass
Cost Recovery	27.30%	16.6%	Pass
Subsidy per Rider	$2.97	$4.81	Pass
Riders per Trip	28.0	10.7	Pass
Riders per Revenue Mile	2.27	1.3	Pass

On June 24, 2018, the "Timed Transfer" at Greenbelt Center was discontinued by WMATA in order to improve the combined service frequency for customers on both routes. The G12 and G14 now run 15 minutes apart during peak hours and 30 minutes during other times.

During the COVID-19 pandemic, routes G12 and G14 operated on its Saturday supplemental schedule beginning on March 16, 2020. However beginning on March 18, 2020, the route was further reduced to operate on its Sunday schedule. Also beginning on March 21, 2020, the G12 and G14 were suspended during the weekends. Full weekday service and Saturday service resumed on August 23, 2020 but with Sunday service now only operating between 8:00 AM to 8:00 PM.

On June 6, 2021, the routes were split into two separate lines, with route G12 remaining the Greenbelt-New Carrollton Line and route G14 being renamed the Greenbelt Road-Good Luck Road Line, trip times and routing remained the same on both routes.

On September 5, 2021, full Sunday service was restored on both routes.

In August 2022, the G12 temporarily bypassed Doctors Community Hospital due to a safety concern. It resumed service on September 14, detouring on Mallery Drive in the process.

In 2024 during WMATA's FY2024 Budget crisis, WMATA proposed to eliminate all G12 service. However on April 25, 2024, Metro’s Board of Directors approved a $4.8 billion capital and operating budget which avoided service cuts.

=== Better Bus Redesign ===
In 2022, WMATA launched its Better Bus Redesign project, which aimed to redesign the entire Metrobus Network and is the first full redesign of the agency's bus network in its history.

In April 2023, WMATA launched its Draft Visionary Network. As part of the drafts, WMATA proposed multiple changes to the Greenbelt Lines.

The current route G12 mostly remained the same, with service inside Old Greenbelt being swapped with TheBus Route 11. The route was named Route MD350.

The G14 was split into two different routes. The portion between Greenbelt station and Goddard Corporate Park mostly remained the same, except the route turning onto Hanover Parkway, Ora Glen Drive, and Mandan Road, and was extended to Bowie State University from Goddard Corporate Park via the former B27 routing along Lanham Severn Road, 11th Street, and Laurel Bowie Road and was named Route MD349. Service along Good Luck Road was changed into Route MD348. The proposed MD348 operated between Goddard Corporate Park and Cherry Hill Campgrounds via Greenbelt Road, Good Luck Road, Doctors Community Hospital, Paint Branch Parkway, College Park–University of Maryland station, then the current Route 83 routing via Baltimore Avenue, Greenbelt Road, Rhode Island Avenue, Edgewood Road, Cherry Hill Road, and Seven Springs Apartments.

A third route combined Routes G12 and G14 into one route that also operated between Greenbelt station and New Carrollton station, operating on the current G12 portion between Greenbelt Road and the intersection of Mandan Road & Greenbelt Road, then operating on the G14 portion along Greenbelt Road, except the route would turn onto Cipriano Road and run until reaching the current G14 routing at the intersection of Cipriano Road & Good Luck Road, then operate on the G14 routing to New Carrollton station. The line was named Route MD351.

During WMATA's Revised Draft Visionary Network, WMATA changed the Greenbelt Lines. The MD348 was retained as Route P46, the MD349 was renamed to the P24 and changed to operate to New Carrollton station instead of Grenebelt station, the MD350 was renamed to the P21 and P22, and the MD351 was renamed to the P20. Additionally, new Routes P25 and P26 were included in the proposals. The changes go as follows:

- The proposed P20 would operate on the current G14 routing between Greenbelt station and Goddard Corporate Park, then operate along Greenbelt Road, then turn onto Lanham Severn Road and operate to New Carrollton along the former Route B27 routing via Lanham Severn Road, Annapolis Road, Harkins Road, and Ellin Road.
- The proposed P21 would operate on the current G12 routing between Greenbelt Station and New Carrollton Station.
- The proposed P22 would operate on a modified TheBus Route 16 routing between Greenbelt station and the intersection of Riverdale Road & Annapolis Road via Beltway Plaza Mall and no service inside Berwyn Heights (with service replaced by the proposed Route P14), then would turn onto Annapolis Road and operate to Cheverly station via the current Route F13 routing between the intersection of Annapolis Road & Harkins Road, and Cheverly station via Cooper Lane, Old Landover Road, Landover Road, Cheverly Avenue, and Columbia Pike Road.
- The proposed P24 would operate on the current G14 routing between New Carrollton Station and Goddard Corporate Park via Good Luck Road, then would operate on Greenbelt Road and turn onto Lanham Severn Road and operate the current B27 routing to Bowie State University.
- The new proposed P25 would operate between Greenbelt station and Bowie High School via the G12 routing between Greenbelt station and Greenway Center, then operate the G14 routing between Greenway Center and Goddard Corporate Park before continuing straight along Greenbelt Road to Annapolis Road via the Glenn Dale Splash Park. Then the line would continue along Annapolis Road to Bowie High School via Moylan Drive and Millstream Drive before terminating at Bowie High School.
- The new proposed P26 would operate as a limited-stop express service during the weekdays only between Greenbelt and New Carrollton via Cirpano Road and Goddard Space Flight Center, operating similar to the former TheBus Route 15X.
- The proposed P46 would operate between College Park–University of Maryland station and New Carrollton station via the G12 routing between New Carrollton station and Doctors Community Hospital, then operate along Good Luck Road and Paint Branch Parkway to College Park station. The original routing between Goddard Corporate Park and Doctors Community Hospital was not included in the proposal, while service between Cherry Hill Campground and College Park was instead operated by the proposed Route M44.

By the time WMATA's 2025 Network Proposal came around, WMATA dropped the P25, P26, and P46 proposals in favor of the P20, P21, and P24 proposals, and had the P22 be operated under TheBus. Route P24 was also modified to have short trips operate between New Carrollton and Goddard Corporate Park on weekdays only. All changes were then proposed during WMATA's 2025 Proposed Network. The P26 proposal would later be revived under TheBus as the P2X, which is the same routing as TheBus Route 15X.

On November 21, 2024, WMATA approved its Better Bus Redesign Network.

Beginning on June 29, 2025, Route G12 was renamed to Route P21, with the route remaining unchanged, while the G14 was renamed to the P20, having service rerouted to serve Lanham-Severn Road between Goddard Corporate Park and Annapolis Road. Service along Good Luck Road and Goddard Corporate Park was replaced by Route P24, which was a modified route of the former B27. Late night and all Sunday trips only operate between New Carrollton and Goddard Corporate Park on Route P24.
