= BoltBus =

American commercial intercity bus service

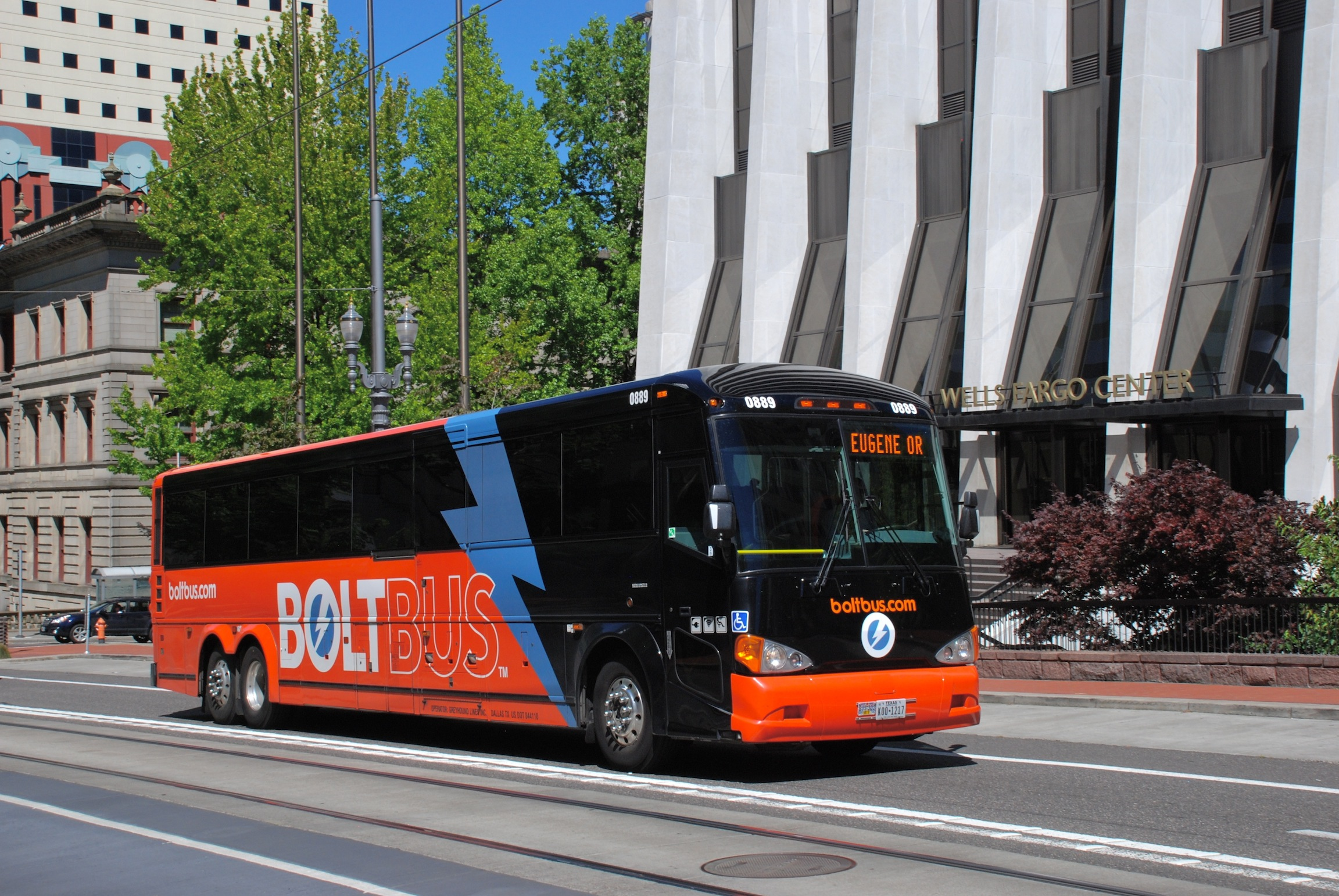
- A BoltBus in Portland, Oregon, in 2014
- Parent: Greyhound Lines
- Founded: March 27, 2008; 18 years ago
- Defunct: July 1, 2021; 5 years ago
- Headquarters: One Dallas Center; 350 N St. Paul St; Dallas, Texas, U.S.
- Service area: Northeastern United States; Pacific Northwest; California/Nevada
- Service type: Intercity bus service
- Destinations: Northeast: Baltimore; Boston; Cherry Hill; Greenbelt, Maryland; Newark, New Jersey; New Haven, Connecticut; New York City; Philadelphia; Washington, D.C. Northwest: Albany; Bellingham; Eugene; Portland; Seattle; Vancouver
- Fleet: 101 units: 70 Prevost X3-45; 31 MCI D4505
- Fuel type: Diesel
- Operator: Greyhound Lines

BoltBus was an intercity bus common carrier and a division of Greyhound Lines that operated from March 2008 until July 2021 in the northeast and western United States and British Columbia, Canada.

At least one ticket on every bus was randomly sold for $1, excluding "handling charges". The $1 fare was the basis for its slogan "Bolt for a Buck".

In the northeast, BoltBus provided service between New York City and South Station Bus Terminal in Boston, Union Station in Washington, D.C., Penn Station in Baltimore, the Greenbelt Metro station in Greenbelt, Maryland, Penn Station in Newark, 30th Street Station in Philadelphia, and the Cherry Hill Mall in Cherry Hill, New Jersey. On the west coast, BoltBus service was offered in Oregon, Washington, and British Columbia, Canada. Service was available between International District/Chinatown station in Seattle and Portland, Pacific Central Station in Vancouver, Bellingham, Albany, and Eugene.

The BoltBus branding incorporated a thunderbolt logo similar to the one used by the British Union of Fascists, but the company claimed that the resemblance was purely coincidental.

When ticketed, passengers were assigned to a boarding group (S, A, B & C). Passengers who purchased their tickets earlier or were members of the company's loyalty program or had special needs got an earlier boarding group assignment.

== History ==
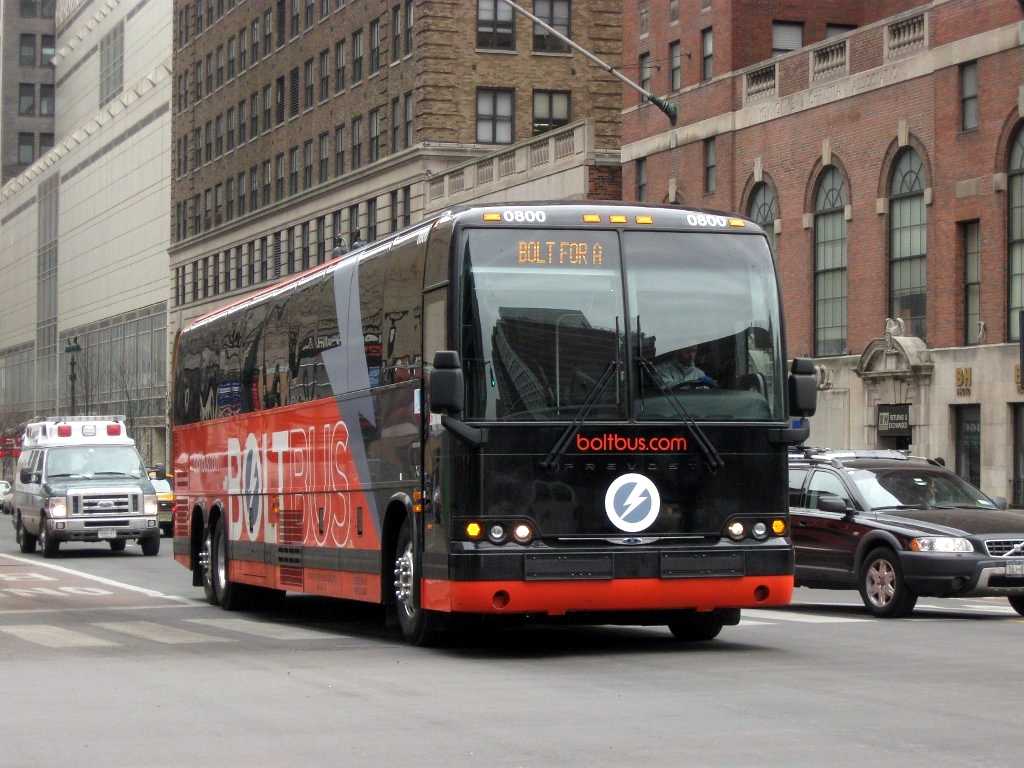
A BoltBus Prevost X3-45 in New York City.

In March 2008, facing competition from Chinatown bus lines in the northeast, Greyhound and Peter Pan Bus Lines partnered to launch BoltBus as a lower-cost brand.

The first route was between New York City and Washington, D.C., launched on March 27, 2008, followed by a route between New York City and Philadelphia launched on April 10, 2008, and between New York City and Boston launched on April 24, 2008.

That year, the company was named one of America's hottest brands by Ad Age.

Stops in Baltimore and Greenbelt, Maryland were added in 2009.

A stop in Newark, New Jersey was added on March 24, 2011.

BoltBus expanded to the Pacific Northwest on May 17, 2012, offering service between Seattle and Portland. Unlike the service in the northeast, Greyhound operated its BoltBus service on the west coast without a partner bus carrier. Service in the Pacific Northwest was expanded to Vancouver and Bellingham on May 31, 2012 and to Albany and Eugene on October 3, 2013.

BoltBus expanded into California on October 31, 2013, offering service between Los Angeles and San Jose and Oakland. A stop at Transbay Terminal in San Francisco was added to the route on December 12, 2013.

A second route between Union Station in Los Angeles and San Diego was added on November 14, 2013.

On December 12, 2013, a route was added between Los Angeles Union Station and Las Vegas, with a stop in Barstow.

In 2015, it added a pickup in Hollywood, Los Angeles for routes to/from Northern California.

In October 2016, the company launched a new onboard entertainment system.

Effective September 27, 2017, after a lengthy legal skirmish, Greyhound and Peter Pan Bus Lines ended their partnership and Greyhound became the sole owner of BoltBus.

On October 19, 2017, BoltBus service was extended to Fresno, California, with routes to Los Angeles, Hollywood, San Jose, San Francisco, and Oakland.

In March 2019, BoltBus added stops in Tacoma, Washington and Everett, Washington. It also added a stop in Wilmington, Delaware.

On July 1, 2021, BoltBus discontinued its operations.

In September 2021, FlixMobility acquired Greyhound.

== Fleet ==
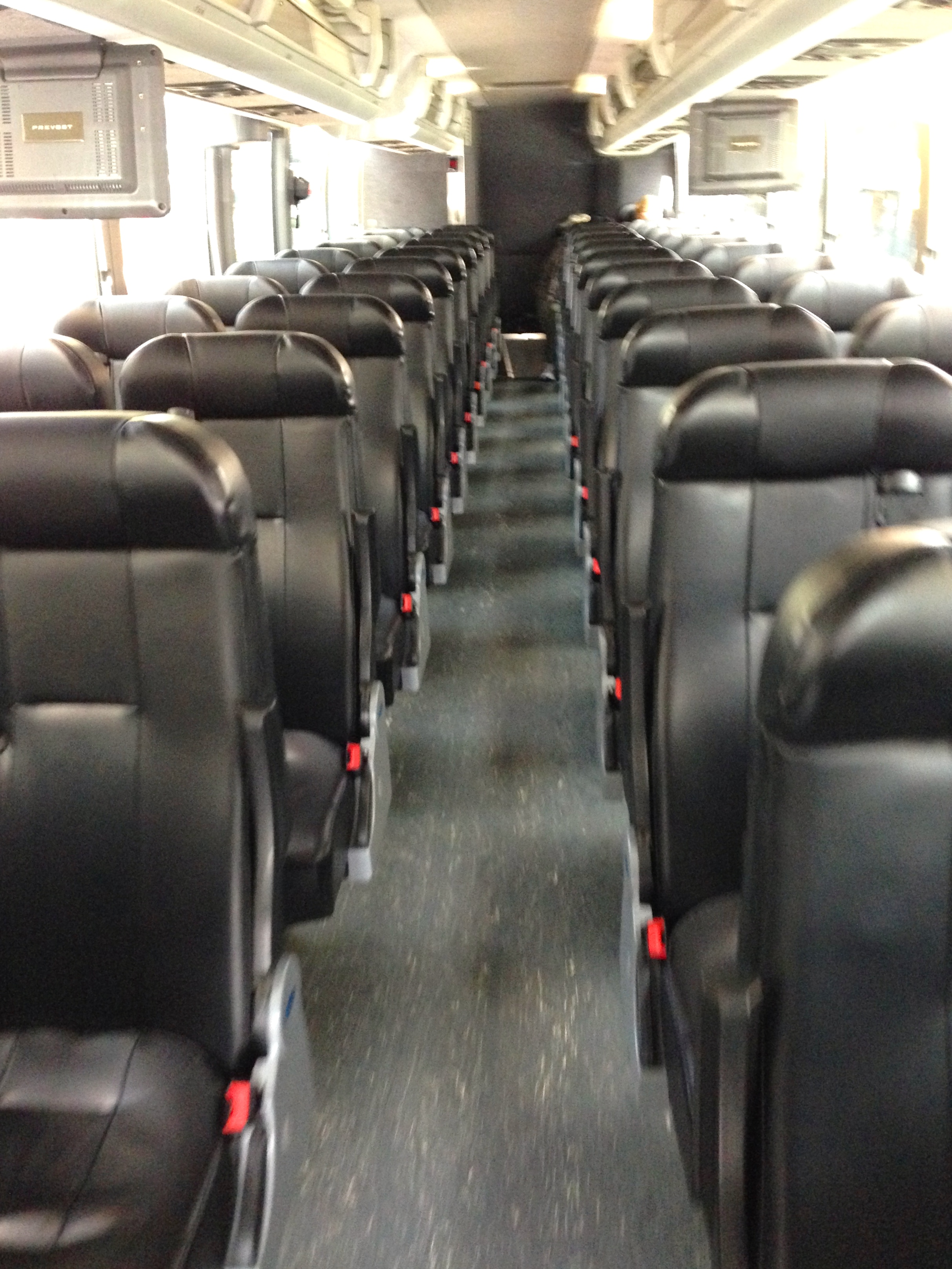
BoltBus interior with leather seats.

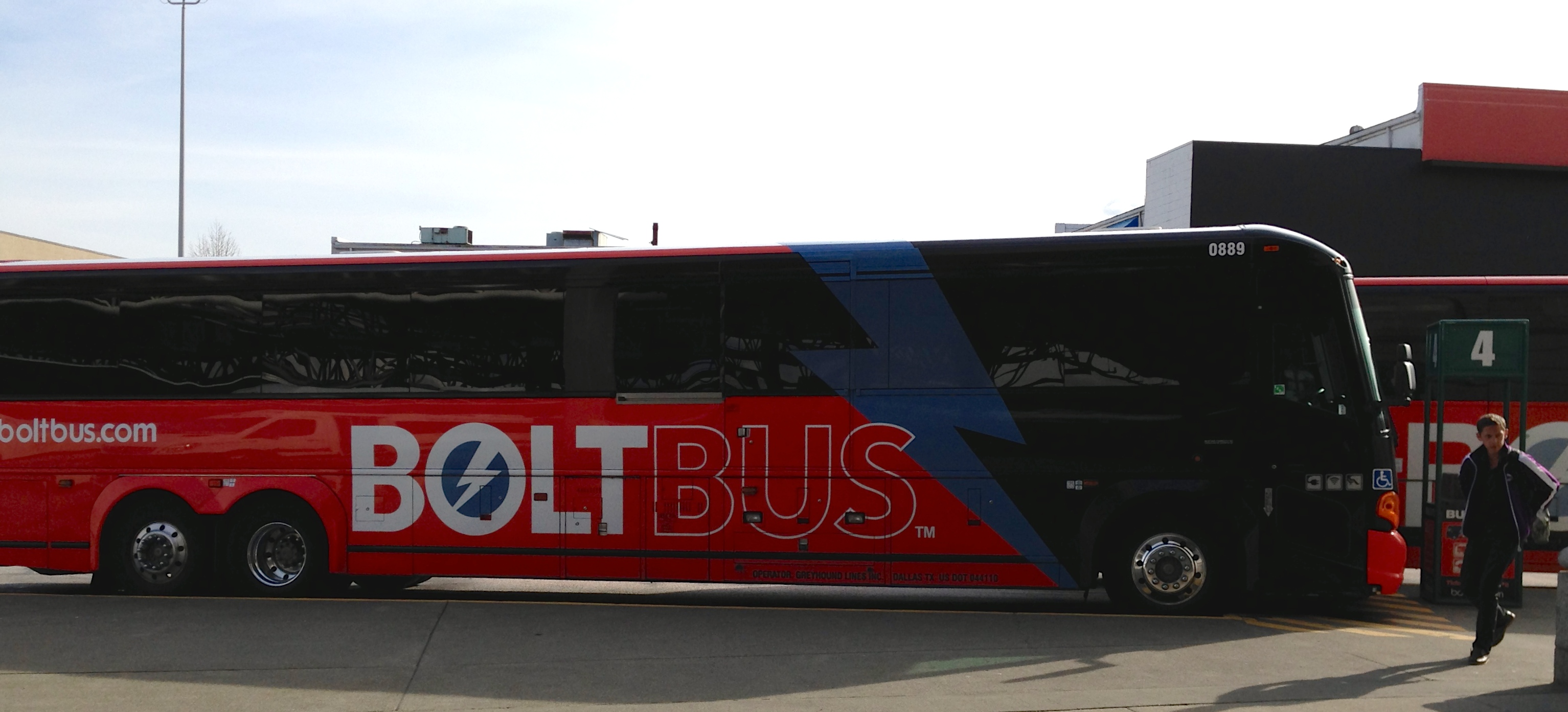
BoltBus #0889, a 2013 Motor Coach Industries D4505 stopped at Pacific Central Station in Vancouver, British Columbia, Canada.

BoltBus routes used Prevost X3-45 and MCI D4505 coaches. All motorcoaches were equipped with wireless internet access and seats that had armrests, footrests, seat belts, cup holders. Most seats had a pair of 120-volt power outlets. The motorcoaches used on BoltBus had 5 fewer seats than the industry standard, giving passengers additional legroom and eliminating the middle seat from the last row.

Manufacturer	Model	Year	Fleet numbers	Notes
Prevost	X3-45	2008	0800-0832	Powered by Detroit Diesel Series 60 14L. Equipped with Amaya Patriot PT seating. 2017 year models are powered by the Volvo D13
Prevost	X3-45	2009	0833-0837, 0840-0841, 0843-0851, 0854-0870	Powered by Detroit Diesel Series 60 14L. Equipped with Amaya Patriot PT seating. 2017 year models are powered by the Volvo D13
Prevost	X3-45	2017	0908-0922	Powered by Detroit Diesel Series 60 14L. Equipped with Amaya Patriot PT seating. 2017 year models are powered by the Volvo D13
Motor Coach Industries	D4505	2012	0886	Owned by Motor Coach Industries, replacement unit for 0883.
Motor Coach Industries	D4505	2014	0887-0901	Powered by Cummins ISX12. Equipped with American Seating Premier.
Van Hool	CX-45	2015	0902-0907	
