= Suitland-Oxon Hill Line =

P96
- Suitland-Oxon Hill Line

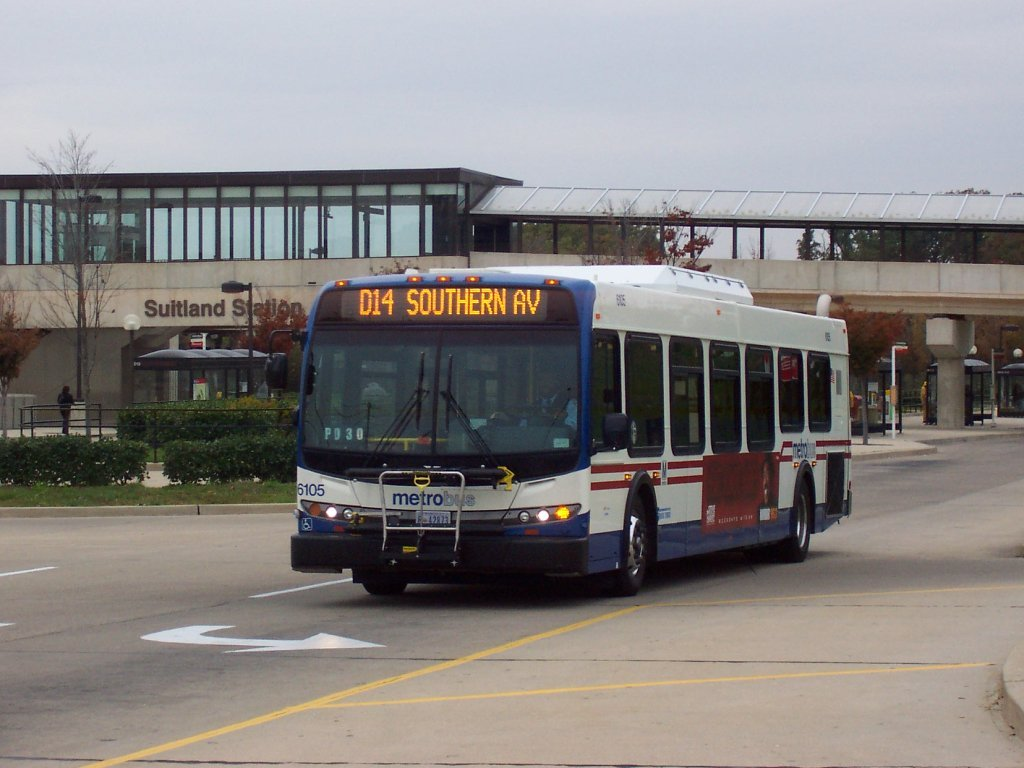
- Former Route D14 at Suitland station

Overview
- System: Metrobus
- Operator: Washington Metropolitan Area Transit Authority
- Garage: Andrews Federal Center
- Livery: Local
- Status: Active
- Predecessors: D12, D13, D14

Route
- Locale: Prince George's County, Maryland
- Communities served: Eastover, Southlawn, Birchwood City, Oxon Hill, Camp Springs, Marlow Heights, Morningside, Camp Springs, Silver Hill, Suitland, Hillcrest Heights, Glassmanor, Forest Heights, Temple Hills
- Landmarks served: Suitland station, Suitland Federal Center, Joint Base Andrews, Camp Springs, Haras Place, Oxon Hill, Oxon Hill Park & Ride Lot
- Start: Suitland station
- Via: Saint Barnabas Road (D12), Brinkley Road, Allentown Road, Indian Head Highway
- End: Oxon Hill Park & Ride
- Length: 60 minutes

Service
- Level: Daily
- Frequency: 30 Minutes
- Operates: D14: 5:00 AM - 12:00 AM (Monday - Friday); 5:30 AM - 12:30 PM (Saturday); 6:00 AM - 10:00 PM (Sunday)
- Ridership: 1,108,318 (D12, FY 2025); 592,826 (D14, FY 2025)
- Timetable: Oxon Hill-Suitland Line (D12); Oxon Hill-Suitland Line (D14)

The Suitland-Oxon Hill Line, designated Route P96, is a daily bus route operated by the Washington Metropolitan Area Transit Authority between Oxon Hill Park & Ride and Suitland station of the Green Line of the Washington Metro. The line operates every 30 minutes daily.

== Background ==
Route P96 operates between Southern Avenue station and Suitland station daily, mainly connecting riders along Brinkley Road, Allentown Road, and Indian Head Highway for route D14.

Route P96 operates out of Andrews Federal Center garage.

=== Former D12 Stops ===
Bus stop	Direction	Connections
Prince George's County, Maryland
Southern Avenue station Bus Bay P	Eastbound station, Westbound terminal	Metrobus: 32, A2, A32, D14, NH1, P12, P18, W1, W2, W14; TheBus: 33, 35, 37; Washington Metro:
Southern Avenue / #1380	Bidirectional	Metrobus: A2, D14, NH1, P12, W2; TheBus: 33, 35, 37
Southern Avenue / United Medical Center	Eastbound	Metrobus: A2, D14, NH1, P12, W2; TheBus: 33, 35, 37
Southern Avenue / Forest Hills Apartments	Westbound	Metrobus: A2, D14, NH1, P12, W2; TheBus: 33, 35, 37
Southern Avenue / 13th Street SE	Bidirectional	Metrobus: A2, D14, NH1, P12, P18, W2, W14; TheBus: 33, 35, 37
Southern Avenue / Wheeler Road	Bidirectional	Metrobus: A2, A6, A7, D14, NH1, P12; TheBus: 33, 35, 37
Southern Avenue / 9th Street SE	Bidirectional	Metrobus: A6, A7, D14, NH1, P12; TheBus: 33, 35, 37
Southern Avenue / Chesapeake Street SE	Bidirectional	Metrobus: A6, A7, D14, NH1, P12, P18, W14; TheBus: 33, 35, 37
Southern Avenue / Robert L. Yeldell Towers	Bidirectional	Metrobus: A6, A7, D14; TheBus: 33, 35, 37
Southern Avenue / Owens Road	Bidirectional	Metrobus: A6, A7, D14; TheBus: 33, 35, 37
Southern Avenue / Barnaby Street SE	Bidirectional	Metrobus: A6, A7, D14; TheBus: 35, 37
Southern Avenue / 6th Street SE	Bidirectional	Metrobus: A6, A7, A8, D14, P18, W14; TheBus: 35, 37
Southern Avenue / South Capitol Street	Westbound	Metrobus: A6, A7, A8, D14, P18, W14; TheBus: 35, 37
Indian Head Highway / Southern Avenue	Bidirectional	Metrobus: A6, A7, A8, D14, P18, W14; TheBus: 35, 37
Audrey Lane / Neptune Avenue	Bidirectional	Metrobus: P12
Audrey Lane / #632	Westbound	Metrobus: P12
Audrey Lane / Deal Drive	Eastbound	Metrobus: P12
Deal Drive / Audrey Lane	Westbound	Metrobus: P12
Deal Drive / Kennebec Street	Westbound	Metrobus: P12
Deal Drive / Dunster Drive	Bidirectional	
Deal Drive / Marcy Avenue	Eastbound	
Marcy Avenue / Neptune Avenue	Westbound	
Marcy Avenue / Leverett Street	Eastbound	
Livingston Terrace / #5501-#5507	Eastbound	
Livingston Terrace / Livingston Road	Westbound	
Livingston Road / Livingston Terrace	Westbound	
Livingston Road / Shawnee Drive	Eastbound	
Birchwood Drive / Livingston Road	Bidirectional	
Birchwood Drive / Dunwoody Avenue	Bidirectional	
Birchwood Drive / Fountain Road	Bidirectional	
Birchwood Drive / Galloway Drive	Bidirectional	
Birchwood Drive / Birchwood Court	Bidirectional	
Birchwood Drive / Fenwood Avenue	Bidirectional	
Helmont Drive / Fenwood Avenue	Bidirectional	
Helmont Drive / Ironton Drive	Bidirectional	
Helmont Drive / Clearview Avenue	Bidirectional	
Helmont Drive / Dundalk Drive	Bidirectional	
Galloway Drive / Fenwood Avenue	Bidirectional	
Galloway Drive / Colony Road	Bidirectional	
Livingston Road / Comanche Drive	Bidirectional	
Livingston Road / Oxon Hill Road	Bidirectional	Metrobus: NH1, W14; TheBus: 35
Oxon Hill Road / Riverside Plaza Apartments	Bidirectional	Metrobus: NH1; TheBus: 35
Oxon Hill Road / #6188	Eastbound	Metrobus: NH1; TheBus: 35
Oxon Hill Road / Rivertowne Commons Market Place	Westbound	Metrobus: NH1; TheBus: 35
Oxon Hill Road / John Hanson Lane	Bidirectional	Metrobus: NH1; TheBus: 35
St. Barnabas Road / Alice Avenue	Bidirectional	Metrobus: NH1
Silver Hill Road / Larry Avenue	Eastbound	Metrobus: NH1
St. Barnabas Road / Rosecroft Village Drive	Westbound	Metrobus: NH1
St. Barnabas Road / #5401	Westbound	Metrobus: NH1
St. Barnabas Road / Arts Drive	Eastbound	Metrobus: NH1
St. Barnabas Road / Wheeler Road	Westbound	TheBus: 33
St. Barnabas Road / Winston Street	Eastbound	TheBus: 33
St. Barnabas Road / Frazier Terrace	Bidirectional	TheBus: 33
St. Barnabas Road / St. Barnabas Church	Westbound	TheBus: 33
St. Barnabas Road / Frazier Drive	Eastbound	TheBus: 33
St. Barnabas Road / Lime Street	Westbound	TheBus: 33
St. Barnabas Road / Kernal Lane	Eastbound	TheBus: 33
St. Barnabas Road / Hagan Road	Bidirectional	TheBus: 33
St. Barnabas Road / Temple Lane	Bidirectional	TheBus: 33
St. Barnabas Road / Temple Hill Road	Eastbound	Metrobus: H12; TheBus: 32, 33
St. Barnabas Road / Raleigh Road	Westbound	Metrobus: H12; TheBus: 32, 33
St. Barnabas Road / Pohanka Place	Bidirectional	Metrobus: H12
St. Barnabas Road / Clifton Road	Bidirectional	Metrobus: H12
St. Barnabas Road / Stamp Road	Bidirectional	Metrobus: H12
St. Barnabas Road / Holly Tree Road	Eastbound	Metrobus: H12
St. Barnabas Road / Leisure Drive	Westbound	Metrobus: H12
St. Barnabas Road / 28th Avenue	Westbound	Metrobus: H12
28th Avenue / St. Barnabas Road	Bidirectional	Metrobus: C12, C14, H12
28th Avenue / Riviera Street	Bidirectional	
28th Avenue / #4219	Bidirectional	
28th Avenue / St. Clair Drive	Bidirectional	Metrobus: H12; TheBus: 32
28th Avenue / Keith Street	Bidirectional	Metrobus: H12; TheBus: 32
Keith Street / Triton Court	Bidirectional	Metrobus: H12
Marlow Heights Shopping Center / #3927	Bidirectional	Metrobus: C12, C14, H12
Marlow Heights Shopping Center / Macy's	Bidirectional	Metrobus: C12, C14, H12
Marlow Heights Shopping Center / 28th Avenue	Bidirectional	Metrobus: C12, C14, H12
St. Barnabas Road / Bedford Way	Bidirectional	Metrobus: C12, C14
St. Barnabas Road / Wilkinson Drive	Bidirectional	
St. Barnabas Road / Silver Hill Road	Bidirectional	Metrobus: P12
Silver Hill Road / Silver Park Drive	Bidirectional	Metrobus: P12
Silver Hill Road / Terrace Drive	Bidirectional	Metrobus: P12
Silver Hill Road / Maywood Lane	Bidirectional	Metrobus: P12
Suitland Station Roadway / Suitland Federal Center	Eastbound	Metrobus: D14, K12, P12, V12; TheBus: 34
Suitland station Bus Bay H	Westbound station, Eastbound terminal	Metrobus: D14, K12, P12, V12; TheBus: 34; MTA Maryland Bus: 735, 850; Washington Metro:

=== Former D14 Stops ===
Bus stop	Direction	Connections
Prince George's County, Maryland
Southern Avenue station Bus Bay Q	Eastbound station, Westbound terminal	Metrobus: 32, A2, A32, D12, NH1, P12, P18, W1, W2, W14; TheBus: 33, 35, 37; Washington Metro:
Southern Avenue / #1380	Bidirectional	Metrobus: A2, D12, NH1, P12, W2; TheBus: 33, 35, 37
Southern Avenue / United Medical Center	Eastbound	Metrobus: A2, D12, NH1, P12, W2; TheBus: 33, 35, 37
Southern Avenue / Forest Hills Apartments	Westbound	Metrobus: A2, D12, NH1, P12, W2; TheBus: 33, 35, 37
Southern Avenue / 13th Street SE	Bidirectional	Metrobus: A2, D12, NH1, P12, P18, W2, W14; TheBus: 33, 35, 37
Southern Avenue / Wheeler Road	Bidirectional	Metrobus: A2, A6, A7, D12, NH1, P12; TheBus: 33, 35, 37
Southern Avenue / 9th Street SE	Bidirectional	Metrobus: A6, A7, D12, NH1, P12; TheBus: 33, 35, 37
Southern Avenue / Chesapeake Street SE	Bidirectional	Metrobus: A6, A7, D12, NH1, P12, P18, W14; TheBus: 33, 35, 37
Southern Avenue / Robert L. Yeldell Towers	Bidirectional	Metrobus: A6, A7, D12; TheBus: 33, 35, 37
Southern Avenue / Owens Road	Bidirectional	Metrobus: A6, A7, D12; TheBus: 33, 35, 37
Southern Avenue / Barnaby Street SE	Bidirectional	Metrobus: A6, A7, D12; TheBus: 35, 37
Southern Avenue / 6th Street SE	Bidirectional	Metrobus: A6, A7, A8, D12, P18, W14; TheBus: 35, 37
Southern Avenue / South Capitol Street	Westbound	Metrobus: A6, A7, A8, D12, P18, W14; TheBus: 35, 37
Indian Head Highway / Southern Avenue	Bidirectional	Metrobus: A6, A7, A8, D12, P18, W14; TheBus: 35, 37
Indian Head Highway / Audrey Lane	Bidirectional	Metrobus: P12, P18, W14; TheBus: 35, 37
Indian Head Highway / Talbert Drive	Eastbound	Metrobus: P18, W14; TheBus: 37
Indian Head Highway / Livingston Road	Westbound	Metrobus: P18, W14; TheBus: 37
Indian Head Highway / Seneca Drive	Eastbound	Metrobus: P18, W14; TheBus: 37
Indian Head Highway / Tecumseh Drive	Eastbound	Metrobus: P18, W14; TheBus: 37
Indian Head Highway / I-95, I-495	Westbound	Metrobus: P18, W14; TheBus: 37
Oxon Hill Park & Ride Lot Bus Bay C	Bidirectional	Metrobus: NH1, NH2, P18; TheBus: 35, 35S
Oxon Hill Road / Harborview Avenue	Bidirectional	Metrobus: NH1, NH2, P18; TheBus: 35, 35S
Oxon Hill Road / Oxon Hill Manor	Southbound	Metrobus: P18; TheBus: 35S
Oxon Hill Road / Tanger Outlets Main Entrance	Northbound	Metrobus: P18; TheBus: 35S
Oxon Hill Road / Pipers Glen Lane	Southbound	Metrobus: P18
Oxon Hill Road / Brockton Road	Northbound	Metrobus: P18
Oxon Hill Road / Abbington Drive	Bidirectional	Metrobus: P18
Oxon Hill Road / Claudia Drive	Bidirectional	Metrobus: P18
Indian Head Highway Service Road / Wilson Towers Apartments	Bidirectional	TheBus: 37
Livingston Road / Murray Hill Drive	Westbound	
Livingston Road / #7916	Eastbound	
Livingston Road / Carey Branch Drive	Eastbound	
Livingston Road / Hart Road	Bidirectional	
Livingston Road / Elwin Road	Bidirectional	
Livingston Road / Broderick Drive	Westbound	
Livingston Road / Busit Avenue	Eastbound	
Livingston Road / White Oak Drive	Bidirectional	
Lindsay Road / Jarrett Avenue	Bidirectional	
Lindsay Road / Wilmette Drive	Eastbound	
Leyte Drive / Lindsay Road	Westbound	
Leyte Drive / #6902	Eastbound	
Leyte Drive / #6903	Westbound	
Leyte Drive / Shelby Drive	Bidirectional	
Wentworth Drive / Haven Avenue	Bidirectional	
Wentworth Drive / #1123	Westbound	
Wentworth Drive / Devonshire Drive	Eastbound	
Wentworth Drive / Westfield Drive	Westbound	
St. Barnabas Road / Tucker Road	Bidirectional	
St. Barnabas Road / Bock Road	Bidirectional	Metrobus: W14; TheBus: 35
St. Barnabas Road / Careyhurst Drive	Bidirectional	TheBus: 35
St. Barnabas Road / Barrowfield Road	Bidirectional	TheBus: 35
St. Barnabas Road / John Hanson Lane	Eastbound	TheBus: 35
Brinkley Road / John Hanson Lane	Westbound	TheBus: 35
Brinkley Road / St. Ignatius Drive	Bidirectional	TheBus: 35
Brinkley Road / #2505	Eastbound	TheBus: 35
Brinkley Road / Kildare Court	Westbound	TheBus: 35
Glen Rock Avenue / Brinkley Road	Bidirectional	
Glen Rock Avenue / Corning Avenue	Bidirectional	
Everhart Place / Corning Avenue	Bidirectional	
Everhart Place / Henson Creek Manor	Bidirectional	
Glen Rock Avenue / Corning Avenue	Bidirectional	
Glen Rock Avenue / Brinkley Road	Bidirectional	
Brinkley Road / Brinkley Crest Townhouses	Bidirectional	TheBus: 33, 35
Brinkley Road / Huntcrest Condos	Bidirectional	TheBus: 33, 35
Brinkley Road / Huntley Square Drive	Eastbound	TheBus: 33, 35
Brinkley Road / Arbor View Apartments	Westbound	TheBus: 33, 35
Brinkley Road / Cherryfield Road	Eastbound	TheBus: 33, 35
Brinkley Road / Roberts Drive	Westbound	TheBus: 33, 35
Brinkley Road / Middlefield Road	Eastbound	TheBus: 33, 35
Brinkley Road / Morton Place	Westbound	TheBus: 33, 35
Brinkley Road / Trude Street	Bidirectional	TheBus: 33, 35
Brinkley Road / Farmer Drive	Bidirectional	TheBus: 33, 35
Brinkley Road / Temple Hill Road	Bidirectional	TheBus: 32, 33, 35
Temple Hill Road / Cardwell Drive	Bidirectional	TheBus: 33
Temple Hill Road / Farmer Drive	Bidirectional	TheBus: 33
Allentown Road / Temple Hill Road	Bidirectional	TheBus: 30, 33, 35, 37
Allentown Road / #7052	Bidirectional	TheBus: 30, 33, 35, 37
Allentown Road / Waldran Avenue	Bidirectional	TheBus: 30, 33, 35, 37
Allentown Road / Karen Anne Drive	Southbound	TheBus: 30, 33, 35, 37
Allentown Road / Kingston Drive	Bidirectional	TheBus: 30, 33, 35, 37
Allentown Road / Westchester Drive	Eastbound	TheBus: 30, 33, 35, 37
Allentown Road / Westchester Court	Bidirectional	TheBus: 30, 33, 35, 37
Allentown Road / Coolridge Road	Bidirectional	TheBus: 30, 33, 35, 37
Allentown Road / Brinkley Road	Bidirectional	TheBus: 30, 32, 33, 35, 37
Allentown Road / Allentown Way	Eastbound	Metrobus: C11, C13; TheBus: 30, 33, 37
Old Branch Avenue / Allentown Way	Bidirectional (Short trips only)	Metrobus: C11, C13; TheBus: 30, 32, 33, 37
Allentown Way / Old Branch Avenue	Bidirectional terminal (Short trips only)	Metrobus: C11, C13; TheBus: 30, 32, 33, 37
Allentown Way / #5816	Bidirectional (Short trips only)	
Allentown Road / Perrie Lane	Bidirectional	TheBus: 30
Allentown Road / Robin Lane	Westbound	TheBus: 30
Allentown Road / Leon Street	Eastbound	TheBus: 30
Allentown Road / #5711	Bidirectional	TheBus: 30
Allentown Road / Maxwell Drive	Westbound	Metrobus: K12; TheBus: 30
Allentown Road / Command Drive Joint Base Andrews (West Gate)	Bidirectional	Metrobus: K12
Allentown Road / Andrews Manor Shopping Center	Bidirectional	Metrobus: K12
Allentown Road / Suitland Road	Westbound	Metrobus: K12
Suitland Road / Allentown Road	Eastbound	Metrobus: K12
Suitland Road / Lou Lane	Eastbound	
Suitland Road / Tournament Street	Westbound	
Suitland Road / Marianne Drive	Eastbound	
Suitland Road / Popular Road	Bidirectional	
Suitland Road / Randolph Road	Bidirectional	
Suitland Road / Pine Line Drive	Eastbound	
Suitland Road / Skyline Terrace	Westbound	
Suitland Road / John Street	Westbound	
Suitland Road / Skyline Drive	Eastbound	
Suitland Road / Woodland Road	Bidirectional	
Suitland Road / Kingswood Drive	Eastbound	
Suitland Road / #5829-#5897	Westbound	
Suitland Road / Rock Quarry Terrace	Eastbound	
Suitland Road / Regency Park Court	Westbound	
Suitland Road / Regency Parkway	Bidirectional	
Regency Parkway / Rock Quarry Terrace	Eastbound	
Regency Parkway / Stoney Meadows Drive	Westbound	
Regency Parkway / Andrew Jackson Middle School	Bidirectional	
Regency Lane / #5745	Bidirectional	
Hil Mar Drive / Monacco Court	Bidirectional	
Hil Mar Drive / Princess Caroline Court	Bidirectional	
Hil Mar Drive / Little Hill Lane	Eastbound	
Hil Mar Drive / Round Hill Lane	Westbound	
Suitland Road / Belgreen Street	Bidirectional	
Suitland Road / Romain Court	Bidirectional	
Suitland Road / Eastern Lane	Bidirectional	
Suitland Road / Silver Hill Road	Eastbound	Metrobus: K12, P12, V12; TheBus: 34
Silver Hill Road / Suitland Road	Eastbound	Metrobus: K12, P12, V12; TheBus: 34
Silver Hill Road / Swann Road	Bidirectional	Metrobus: K12, P12, V12; TheBus: 34
Silver Hill Road / Randall Road	Bidirectional	Metrobus: K12, P12, V12; TheBus: 34
Silver Hill Road / Parkway Terrace Drive	Westbound	Metrobus: K12, P12, V12; TheBus: 34
Suitland Station Roadway / Suitland Federal Center	Eastbound	Metrobus: D12, P12, K12, V12; TheBus: 34; MTA Maryland Bus: 735, 850
Suitland station Bus Bay J	Westbound station, Eastbound terminal	Metrobus: D12, K12, P12, V12; TheBus: 34; MTA Maryland Bus: 735, 850; Washington Metro:

== History ==
Routes D12 and D14 was originally operated under the Washington Marlboro & Annapolis Motor Lines Inc. (WM&A) which operated between Eastover Shopping Center and Downtown Washington DC beginning in 1945 (D14) and 1948 (D12). The line was connected via South Capitol Street towards Downtown (11th and E Streets NW). Route D12 originally was named Route D while route D14 was originally named Route M. In 1953 WM&A adopted letter designations for its routes with new routes D12 and D14. In 1973, routes D12 and D14 were acquired by WMATA when they acquired the WM&A.

Later, route D14 would be eliminated, but a new route S12 would be introduced to operate alongside the D12. Route S12 would operate between Southview apartments and Federal Center station while route D12 operate between Marlow Heights and Federal Center station. At the time, the line was run as the Eastover–Marlow Heights Line.

On November 21, 1978, both routes D12 and S12 were shorten to operate between Eastover Shopping Center and Federal Center station. S12 service between Southview Apartments and Eastover was replaced by route P12.

On January 3, 2000, new boarding and alighting restrictions were implemented on route D12. During the AM rush, passengers can get on and off any southbound D12 bus going to Marlow Heights at any bus stop in Maryland and the District of Columbia with restrictions for northbound buses not changing. Passengers can get on and off the bus in Maryland but only get off the bus at stops in the District of Columbia.

During the PM rush, passengers can get on and off northbound buses going to Federal Center SW at any bus stop in Maryland and the District of Columbia with southbound restrictions not changing. Passengers can only get on the bus in the District of Columbia, and get on or off the bus at any stop in Maryland.

On January 13, 2001, when the Green Line extension to Branch Avenue station opened, route D12 was rerouted to operate between Suitland station and Southern Avenue station mainly operating along Saint Barnabas Road, Oxon Hill Road, Indian Head Highway, and Southern Avenue. Buses were also rerouted via 28th Avenue and Keith Street (behind Marlow Heights Shopping Center) and extended from the shopping center to the Suitland station via Branch Avenue and Saint Barnabas and Silver Hill roads.

Routes W11 and W12 from the Eastover–Indian Head Highway Line were also rerouted to operate alongside the D12 between Southern Avenue and Suitland stations and were renamed into routes D13 (W11) and D14 (W12). The line would mainly operate along Suitland Road, Allentown Road, Brinkley Road, Livingston Road, Indian Head Highway, and Southern Avenue. The line also operated via Andrews Air Force Base, as well as the Camp Springs, Temple Hills, and Glassmanor neighborhoods, which former Routes W11, W12, and W17 originally operated on between the Federal Center SW station and Acokeek.

All route S12 service was eliminated in the process being replaced by route D12, and P12.

In 2010 during WMATA's FY2011 budget, WMATA proposed to divert routes D13 and D14 into Oxon Hill Park & Ride Lot off Oxon Hill Road just west of Indian Head Highway in order to create a transfer connection between those routes and the NH1, which serves National Harbor. This would provide closer connections to National Harbor for passengers instead of having to take the Green Line to Branch Avenue station.

Beginning on October 15, 2019, for two years, eastbound D13 and D14 buses were forced to detour due to the Maryland State Highway Administration’s Maryland Route 210 Interchange Project. This prevents buses from turning left from Indian Head Hwy - MD 210 onto Livingston Road. As a result, routes D13 and D14 were forced to backtrack along Indian Head Highway detouring on Wilson Bridge Drive, before resuming its regular route Lindsay Rd at Livingston Rd. A temporary time transfer was also implemented for affected passengers at closed bus stops westbound. Westbound buses were unaffected by the detour.

During the COVID-19 pandemic, route D13 was suspended and routes D12 and D14 was reduced to operate on its Saturday supplemental schedule during the weekdays beginning on March 16, 2020. On March 18, 2020, the line was further reduced to operate on its Sunday schedule. On March 21, 2020, weekend service on the D14 became suspended and Route D12 was reduced to operate every 30 minutes. Service was restored to its full service on August 23, 2020.

In February 2021 during WMATA's FY2022 budget crisis, WMATA proposed to add late-night service to 2:00 AM on Route D12 beginning in July 2021. However beginning in January 2022, WMATA proposed to eliminate Routes D13 and D14, and extend the D12 to National Harbor via Oxon Hill Pakr & Ride to replace the NH1 and eliminate service between Southern Avenue station and Livingston Road & Oxon Hill Road, plus all service after midnight daily. Subsequently on April 22, 2021, WMATA approved the FY2022 budget and received federal funding to avoid service cuts.

On June 6, 2021, late-night service was increased to operate up to 2:00 AM on Route D12.

On June 10, 2021 as part of WMATA's Pandemic Recovery Plan, WMATA proposed to increase the D12 to operate every 20 minutes daily between 7:00 AM to 9:00 PM daily, and combine the D13 and D14 into one route. The new Route D14 would operate on the current D13 routing, and would be rerouted inside Oxon Hill to operate along Kerby Hill Road and Oxon Hill to serve Oxon Hill Park & Ride with service along Livingston Road, Livingston Terrace, Marcy Avenue, Deal Drive, Kennebec Street, Glassmanor Drive, Irvington Street, and Audrey Lane being eliminated.

Beginning on June 15, 2021, eastbound routes D13 and D14 resumed its regular routing on Livingston Road following the completion of the Maryland State Highway Administration's Maryland Route 210 Interchange Project.

On September 5, 2021, all Route D13 service was renamed to the D14 while D14 service along Livingston Road, Livingston Terrace, Marcy Avenue, Deal Drive, Kennebec Street, Glassmanor Drive, Irvington Street, and Audrey Lane in Glassmanor was eliminated. Service was replaced by Routes D12 and P12 which increased service to every 12 (P12) and 20 (D12) minutes. Between Wilson Bridge Drive and the intersection of Indian Head Highway & Oxon Hill Road, service will operate along Kirby Hill Road and Oxon Hill Road, adding service at Oxon Hill Park & Ride. Service will continue to Wilson Bridge Drive. Additionally, Route D12 was increased to operate every 20 minutes daily between 7:00 AM to 9:00 PM daily.

Due to rising cases of the COVID-19 Omicron variant, the line was reduced to its Saturday service on weekdays beginning on January 10, 2022. Full weekday service resumed on February 7, 2022.

On December 17, 2023, route D12 was rerouted to operate along Deal Drive and Audrey Lane in Glassmanor, discontinuing service along Glassmanor Drive and Irvington Street.

In 2024 during WMATA's FY2024 Budget crisis, WMATA proposed to eliminate all D14 service, and eliminate all trips after midnight for Route D12, and reduce the frequency of buses from 20 minutes to 30 minutes. However on April 25, 2024, Metro’s Board of Directors approved a $4.8 billion capital and operating budget which avoided service cuts.

=== Better Bus Redesign ===
In 2022, WMATA launched its Better Bus Redesign project, which aimed to redesign the entire Metrobus Network and is the first full redesign of the agency's bus network in its history.

In April 2023, WMATA launched its Draft Visionary Network.

As part of the drafts, WMATA proposed to combine the D12 with the NH2 and operate the route between Suitland station and King Street–Old Town station. The line named Route MD263 would operate on the D12 routing between Suitland station and the intersection of Oxon Hill Road & Livingston Road via St. Barnabas Road, then would continue along Oxon Hill Road and serve Oxon Hill Park & Ride, MGM National Harbor, Eisenhower Avenue station, and King Street–Old Town station via Monument Avenue, National Harbor Boulevard, St. George Boulevard, the Capital Beltway, the Woodrow Wilson Bridge, Eisenhower Avenue, Mill Road, Jamieson Avenue, Dulany Street, and Diagonal Road.

D12 service between Southern Avenue station and Birchwood City would be combined with the P12 and named Route MD265. The routing follows the P12 routing between Southern Avenue station and Eastover Shopping Center via Southern Avenue SE, Southview Drive, Iverson Street, Owens Road, Kennebec Street, Deal Drive, and Audrey Lane, but the route would turn onto Indian Head Highway, then operate on Livingston Road before serving the D12's Birchwood City loop via Birchwood Drive, Galloway Drive, and Helmont Drive. Following the loop, the proposed Route MD265 would continue to National Harbor via Livingston Road, Oxon Hill Park & Ride, Monument Avenue, National Harbor Boulevard, and St. George Boulevard.

Route D14 would also be changed. In one of the proposals, which is named Route MD264, the D14 was to follow the D12 routing to Marlow Heights Shopping Center via Silver Hill Road, St. Barnabas Road, 28th Avenue, Keith Street, and St Clair Drive. The proposed route would then continue on St. Barnabas Road and turn onto Temple Hills Road, then onto Fisher Road, partially taking over Route H12 service. The route would then turn onto Brinkley Road, then operate a modified routing of the D14 to Oxon Hill Park & Ride via Brinkley Road, the Haras Place loop, Oxon Hill Road, Livingston Road, Wentworth Drive, Leyte Drive, Lindsay Road, Livingston Road, Wilson Towers Apartments, Kirby Hill Road, and Oxon Hill Road. The D14 portion between Suitland station and the intersection of Allentown Road & Temple Hill Road also remained the same, but remained along Allentown Road and operated to Hunters Mill Shopping Center via Tucker Road, Palmer Road, and Livingston Road, and was named as Route MD367.

D12 service between Southern Avenue station and the intersection of Indian Head Highway & Audrey Lane, and D14 service between Southern Avenue station and Oxon Hill Park & Ride was taken over by the proposed MD376 (Route W14) and MD377 (Route P18).

During WMATA's Revised Draft Visionary Network, WMATA renamed Route MD263 to Route P94, keeping the same routing from the visionary network proposal, except the Route would now serve National Harbor directly via Monument Avenue, National Harbor Boulevard, St. George Boulevard, and MGM National Avenue. Route MD264 was renamed to Route P96 and was changed to no longer loop around Marlow Heights Shopping Center, and was instead changed to operate on Silver Hill Road to serve Iverson Street, then was rerouted to take Deer Park Heights to St Clair Drive to serve Marlow Heights Shopping Center without having to loop around. The line would then operate along Olson Street and Raleigh Road before operating on the original proposed Route MD264 routing to Oxon Hill Park & Ride. The P96 would also operate on the D12's Birchwood City loop instead of the proposed MD265. Route MD367 was also retained and renamed to Route P87, but would instead operate along Brinkley Road to Oxon Hill Park & Ride via Oxon Hill Road.

The proposed route MD265 was merged with the proposed Route MD148 and renamed to Route P93. The new proposed P93 would operate on the proposed MD148 portion between Suitland station and Eastover Shopping Center via Silver Hill Road, Iverson Street, Iverson Place, Wheeler Road, Forest Hill Apartments, Southern Avenue SE, and Southern Avenue station (current Route P12), then operate on the proposed Route MD265 to National Harbor via Southview Drive, Iverson Street, Owens Road, Kennebec Street, Deal Drive, Audrey Lane, Eastover Shopping Center, Livingston Road, Oxon Hill Park & Ride, Monument Avenue, National Harbor Boulevard, and St. George Boulevard.

All changes were then proposed during WMATA's 2025 Proposed Network.

Following the 2025 Proposed Network, WMATA made more changes to the proposed P87, P93, P94, and P96. Route P94 was renamed to Route P90, which kept the same routing between Suitland station and King Street-Old Town station, with additional trips only operating between Suitland and Oxon Hill Park & Ride daily. Route P93 was modified to serve the Birchwood City loop and no longer operate to National Harbor, and kept the same routing between Suitland station and the intersection of Livingston Road & Birchwood Drive. A new Route P94 would operate on the same proposed routing that the P93 was originally supposed to operate between Suitland station and National Harbor. Both the P93 and P94 would have a combined frequency of 12 minutes daily between the two routes. Routes P87 and P96 would remain the same from the revised proposals.

On November 21, 2024, WMATA approved its Better Bus Redesign Network, with service on the College Park Line being simplified.

Beginning on June 29, 2025, the D12 kept its routing between Suitland station and Oxon Hill Road via St. Barnabas Road, but was changed to continue along Oxon Hill Road and serve Oxon Hill Park & Ride, National Harbor, and King Street–Old Town station, combining the route with the NH2, and was renamed into the P90. Service to Birchwood City was replaced by Route P93, which was a combination of the D12 and P12. Service to Marlow Heights Shopping Center was discontinued.

The D14 was modified into two routes. One of the new routes was renamed into the P96 and was partially combined with the H12 and had a modified routing between Oxon Hill Park & Ride and Haras Place Loop. The second route was renamed into the P87 and also operated between Suitland and Oxon Hill Park & Ride via the former D14 routing, except the route turns onto Brinkley Road and no longer operates along Temple Hills Road. The route remains straight along Brinkley Road before terminating at Oxon Hill Park & Ride.

Service to Southern Avenue station on both Routes D12 and D14 were discontinued.
