= National Harbor–Alexandria Line =

Bus route in Maryland and Virginia

NH2
- National Harbor-Alexandria Line

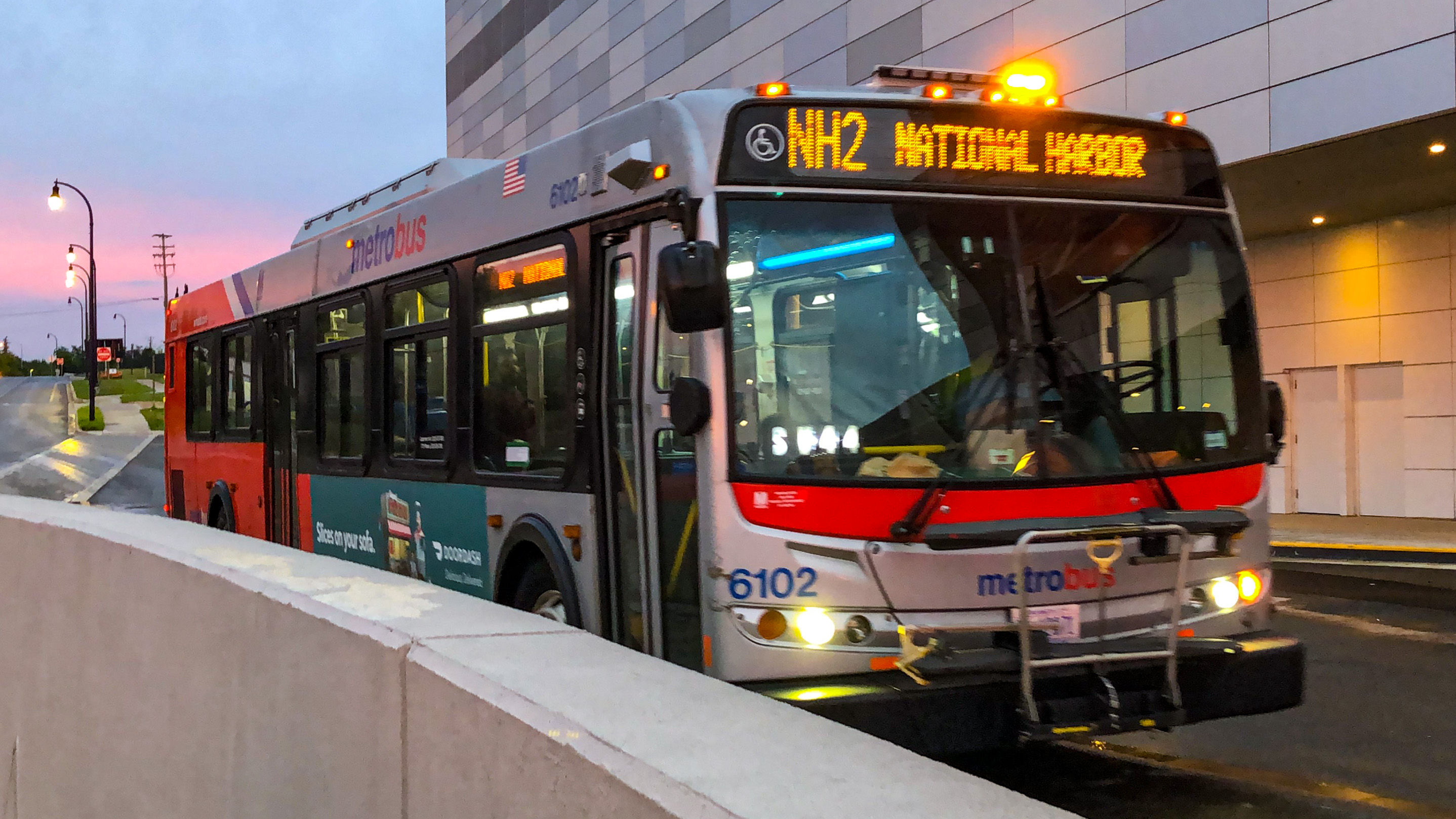
- Route NH2 at MGM National Harbor Casino

Overview
- System: Metrobus
- Operator: Washington Metropolitan Area Transit Authority
- Garage: Four Mile Run (Weekday); Shepherd Parkway (Weekend)
- Livery: Local
- Status: Merged with D12 and replaced by route P90
- Began service: October 23, 2016
- Ended service: June 29, 2025

Route
- Locale: Prince George's County, Maryland, Alexandria, Virginia
- Communities served: Alexandria, Oxon Hill, National Harbor
- Landmarks served: King Street–Old Town station, Carlyle, Oxon Hill Park & Ride Lot, MGM National Harbor, National Harbor
- Start: King Street–Old Town station
- Via: I-495, Woodrow Wilson Bridge, Monument Avenue / MGM National Avenue
- End: National Harbor (St. George Boulevard & Waterfront Street)

Service
- Level: Daily
- Frequency: 30 Minutes
- Operates: 5:00 AM – 12:00 AM
- Ridership: 302,378 (FY 2024)
- Transfers: SmarTrip only
- Timetable: National Harbor-Alexandria Line

The National Harbor–Alexandria Line, designated as Route NH2, was a daily bus route operated by the Washington Metropolitan Area Transit Authority between King Street–Old Town station of the Blue and Yellow Lines of the Washington Metro and National Harbor via the Woodrow Wilson Bridge. The line operates every 30 minutes at all times. NH2 trips were roughly 30 minutes. This line provided service to National Harbor and MGM National Harbor from Alexandria, Virginia via the Woodrow Wilson Bridge at Capital Beltway (I-495). It was the only Metrobus route that operates via the bridge and the only Metrobus route that connected Maryland and Virginia by bus.

== Route description and service ==
=== Background ===
The NH2 was created as a plot route on October 23, 2016, due to high demand. The route would be a plot for nine months and if successful, the NH2 would become a permanent route in 2017. The route is funded by National Harbor developer Peterson Companies, the City of Alexandria, Fairfax County and the Maryland Department of Transportation in a unique public/private partnership. The route had since become permanent by July 2017.

The NH2 operated between 5:00 AM with the last bus leaving at 12:00 AM every 30 minutes daily. The NH2 operated buses out of Shepherd Parkway division.

=== Stops ===
Bus stop	Direction	Connections
Alexandria, Virginia
King Street – Old Town Station Bus Bay J	Eastbound stop, Westbound terminal	Amtrak and VRE (at Alexandria Union Station); DASH: 30, 31, 32, 33, 102, King Street Trolley; Metrobus: 28A, 29K, 29N; Richmond Highway Express; Washington Metro:
Dulaney Street / Duke Street	Bidirectional	DASH: 32; Richmond Highway Express
Mill Road / Eisenhower Avenue	Eastbound	DASH: 32 Richmond Highway Express
Eisenhower Avenue / Swamp Fox Road	Westbound	DASH: 32; Richmond Highway Express
Woodrow Wilson Memorial Bridge
Oxon Hill, Maryland
Oxon Hill Road / Harborview Avenue	Westbound	Metrobus: D14, NH1, P18; TheBus: 35
Oxon Hill Park & Ride Bus Bay A	Bidirectional	Metrobus: D14, NH1, P18; TheBus: 35
Monument Avenue MGM Casino	Bidirectional	Metrobus: NH1; TheBus: 35
St. George Boulevard / Waterfront Street National Harbor	Westbound stop, Eastbound terminal	Metrobus: NH1; TheBus: 35

== History ==
National Harbor opened on April 1, 2008, with the opening of the Gaylord National Resort & Convention Center and has since got more attractions like Tanger Outlets and the Capital Wheel. With the opening of the new Woodrow Wilson Bridge, it could handle capacity for any future Washington Metro line that would connect to National Harbor. However, there were no plans to build any lines over the bridge. Instead, the state of Maryland pays $312,000 annually for the NH1 to National Harbor from the Southern Avenue station on the Green Line. The NH1 would begin service on March 23, 2008.

In June 2008, Gaylord National Resort and Convention Center asked Maryland to fund additional transit service since employees found it difficult to reach National Harbor. In 2011, Metro began considering the possibility of building a rail extension to National Harbor via the Green Line as part of its long-term plan. In 2013, it was also proposal for the NH1 to serve King Street station and alternative service would be provided by TheBus 35 with the NH1 serving Southern Ave during late nights. However the proposal didn't go through and plans for a Metrobus service along the Woodrow Wilson Bridge was shelved.

On June 8, 2016, the Metro Board announced a proposal to create a new Route NH2 that would operate between Huntington station and National Harbor via the Woodrow Wilson Bridge, which would make it the first Metrobus route to operate between Maryland and Virginia since 2004. It would serve King Street–Old Town station, Oxon Hill Park & Ride, and MGM National Harbor. The route would operate between 6:00 AM and 1:00 AM and operate every 30 minutes daily. The route would operate between October 2016 and June 2017 as a nine-month pilot, allowing Metro to evaluate ridership demand, conduct customer surveys, and complete an FTA-required Title VI equity analysis. If the route were to be successful, WMATA would implement the NH2 as a permanent route during WMATA's FY2018 budget year beginning on July 1, 2017.

The pilot is expected to cost around $2.175 million, covered by a mixture of bus fares, Prince George's County, Maryland's Department of Transportation, the City of Alexandria, Fairfax County, and $500,000 from National Harbor's developer the Peterson Group. If the route were to become permanent, a full year of service would cost close to $2.9 million.

=== Introduction of the NH2 ===
On October 23, 2016, WMATA implemented the NH2 as a nine-month test plot due to high demand. The NH2 is the first route to provide service across the reconstructed Woodrow Wilson Bridge, the first route since the former N11 & N13 route that ran between King Street station and Branch Avenue/Suitland stations before June 2004.

Before the NH2 was implemented, passengers would have to travel via the Yellow Line to L'Enfant Plaza station. Then they'll have to transfer onto a Branch Avenue bound Green Line train to Southern Avenue station to catch the NH1. Passengers can use the NH2 without having to travel through Washington, D.C. and instead travel via the Bridge. Before the NH2 came into service, National Harbor only had two bus routes heading into National Harbor. Besides the already running NH1, National Harbor also had TheBus 35 and 35S. However, both routes would only operate on weekdays. National Harbor also used to have Metrobus NH3 which would be replaced by the NH1 when it was rerouted back to Southern Avenue.

With the introduction of the NH2, the route will fill the demand from passengers running from Alexandria Virginia to National Harbor.

Due to the success of the NH2, WMATA made the route permanent in its FY2018 budget year beginning on June 25, 2017.

=== Changes ===
Beginning on September 9, 2018, the St George Blvd & Waterfront St bus stop in National Harbor was discontinued and the NH2 along with the NH1 were rerouted to follow straight on National Harbor Blvd, turn right on Waterfront Street, and make a right turn onto St. George Blvd where it'll serve its current stop at Waterfront St & Potomac Passage. The reason WMATA made the reroute was due to traffic congestion along Downtown National Harbor (Waterfront St) and wanted to offer customers a more efficient trip. However, it meant that both the NH1 & NH2 only served one stop at National Harbor.

During WMATA's 2020 Fiscal Year budget, it was proposed for the NH2 to be shorten to King Street–Old Town station only and discontinue service to Huntington station as it overlaps both the Yellow Line and the Richmond Highway Express. However the frequency for buses will decrease from 30 to 40 minutes every day, with post-midnight trips being eliminated.

In response to the COVID-19 pandemic route NH2 began operating on its weekend schedule beginning on March 16, 2020, with weekend service being suspended. All route NH2 was temporarily suspended on June 28, 2020, due to the route having low ridership following reduced service, and low demand at National Harbor. WMATA announced the NH2 would return to service on August 23, 2020, as part of the Metro's COVID-19 Recovery Plan, with some minor changes of the route. Service between King Street–Old Town station and Huntington station was eliminated as the NH2 overlaps with the Yellow Line and Richmond Highway Express. Weekend service also remained suspended.

On September 26, 2020, as part of its FY2022 proposed budget, WMATA proposed to eliminate all weekend route NH2 service to reduce costs and low federal funds. However on March 14, 2021, all weekend service on route NH2 was restored operating on its pre-pandemic schedule.

In 2024 during WMATA's FY2024 Budget crisis, WMATA proposed to eliminate all NH2 service. However on April 25, 2024, Metro’s Board of Directors approved a $4.8 billion capital and operating budget which avoided service cuts.

=== Better Bus Redesign ===
In 2022, WMATA launched its Better Bus Redesign project, which aimed to redesign the entire Metrobus Network and is the first full redesign of the agency's bus network in its history.

In April 2023, WMATA launched its Draft Visionary Network. As part of the drafts, WMATA proposed multiple services to operate along the Woodrow Wilson Bridge. One of the routes was named Route MD263 and would be the main service that would operate along the Woodrow Wilson Bridge. The proposed route would operate between King Street–Old Town station and Suitland station via the current D12 routing between Suitland station and the intersection of Oxon Hill Road & Livingston Road via St. Barnabas Road, then would continue along Oxon Hill Road and serve Oxon Hill Park & Ride, MGM National Harbor, Eisenhower Avenue station, and King Street–Old Town station via Monument Avenue, National Harbor Boulevard, St. George Boulevard, the Capital Beltway, the Woodrow Wilson Bridge, Eisenhower Avenue, Mill Road, Jamieson Avenue, Dulany Street, and Diagonal Road.

The current NH2 would be renamed to Route VA389 and would keep the same routing as the current NH2. A third route operating along the Bridge would be named Route VA488, and would operate between National Harbor and Franconia–Springfield station via St. George Boulevard, MGM National Avenue, Oxon Hill Park & Ride, Monument Avenue, MGM National Harbor, the Capital Beltway, the Woodrow Wilson Bridge, Richmond Highway, Huntington Avenue, Huntington station, Telegraph Road, Eisenhower Avenue, Eisenhower Avenue station, Van Dorn Street station, South Van Dorn Street, Kingstowne Boulevard, Manchester Boulevard, and Franconia-Springfield Parkway.

During WMATA's Revised Draft Visionary Network, WMATA renamed Route MD263 to Route P94, keeping the same routing from the visionary network proposal. Additionally, the proposed P94 also incorporates the proposed VA389 routing into the route, operating directly into National Harbor via Monument Avenue, National Harbor Boulevard, St. George Boulevard, and MGM National Avenue, alongside operating along the proposed MD263 routing. WMATA also renamed Route VA488 to Route F88, keeping the same routing. However, the proposed F88 was extended to Springfield Park & Ride (Backlick North Park & Ride) via Frontier Drive, Spring Mall Drive, Loisdale Road, Commerce Street, and Backlick Road.

Before WMATA's 2025 Proposed Network, the proposed Route F88 was dropped completely in favor of the Route P94 proposal. All changes were then proposed during WMATA's 2025 Proposed Network.

During WMATA's 2025 Proposed Network, Route P94 was renamed to Route P90, keeping its proposed routing.

On November 21, 2024, WMATA approved its Better Bus Redesign Network.

Beginning on June 29, 2025, Route NH2 was merged with the D12, operating between King Street–Old Town station and Suitland station via National Harbor and St Barnabas Road as Route P90, keeping the existing routing of the former NH2. Every other trip would operate between Suitland and Oxon Hill Park & Ride during the weekdays.
