= National Harbor Line =

Bus route in Maryland

NH1
- National Harbor Line

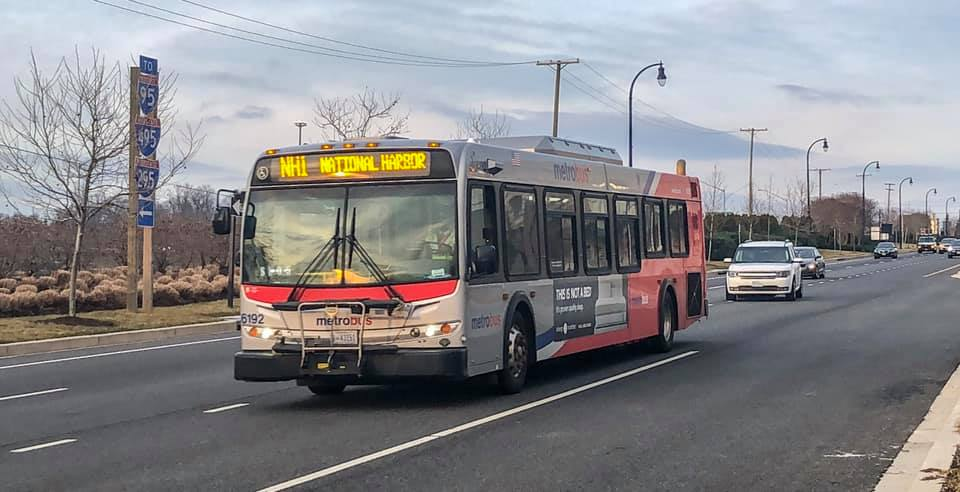
- A D40LFR operating on the NH1

Overview
- System: Metrobus
- Operator: Washington Metropolitan Area Transit Authority
- Garage: Andrews Federal Center
- Livery: Local
- Status: Discontinued
- Began service: NH1: March 23, 2008; NH3: December 29, 2013
- Ended service: NH1: June 29, 2025; NH3: June 21, 2015

Route
- Locale: Prince George's County
- Communities served: Temple Hills, Oxon Hill, National Harbor
- Landmarks served: Southern Avenue station, Rivertowne Commons Shopping Center, Oxon Hill Park & Ride Lot, MGM National Harbor, National Harbor, Maryland
- Start: Southern Avenue station
- Via: Southern Ave, Owens Road, Oxon Hill Road, Monument Avenue / MGM National Avenue, St. George Boulevard
- End: National Harbor (St. George Boulevard & Waterfront Street)

Service
- Level: Daily
- Frequency: 30 – 40 Minutes
- Operates: 5:45 AM – 12:00 AM
- Ridership: 441,451 (FY 2024)
- Transfers: SmarTrip only
- Timetable: National Harbor Line

The National Harbor Line, designated as Route NH1, was a daily bus route operated by the Washington Metropolitan Area Transit Authority between Southern Avenue station of the Green Line of the Washington Metro and National Harbor. The line operated every 30 minutes at rush hour and 40 minutes all other times. NH1 trips were roughly 30–35 minutes. This line provided service to National Harbor and MGM National Harbor from Southern Avenue station. Service to Alexandria, Virginia was provided by the NH2.

== Route description ==
The NH1 operated beginning at 5:45 AM with the last bus leaving at 12:00 AM connecting Southern Avenue station to National Harbor via Southview Apartments and Oxon Hill Parking Lot. The NH1 operated buses out of Andrews Federal Center division. Prior to 2012, the NH1 would get its buses out of Southern Avenue division, and prior to 2021, the NH1 would get its buses out of Shepherd Parkway division.

=== NH1 Stops ===
Bus stop	Direction	Connections
Prince George's County, Maryland
St. George Boulevard / Waterfront Street National Harbor	Westbound terminal, Eastbound stop	Metrobus: NH2; TheBus: 35
Oxon Hill Road / Harborview Avenue	Eastbound	Metrobus: D14, NH2, P18; TheBus: 35
Monument Avenue MGM Casino	Westbound	Metrobus: NH2; TheBus: 35
Oxon Hill Park & Ride Bus Bay A	Bidirectional	Metrobus: D14, NH2, P18; TheBus: 35
Oxon Hill Road / Felker Avenue	Bidirectional	Metrobus: W14; TheBus: 35
Oxon Hill Road / Livingston Road	Bidirectional	Metrobus: W14; TheBus: 35
Oxon Hill Road / Riverside Plaza Apartments	Bidirectional	Metrobus: D12; TheBus: 35
Oxon Hill Road / #6188	Eastbound	Metrobus: D12; TheBus: 35
Oxon Hill Road / Rivertowne Commons Market Place	Westbound	Metrobus: D12; TheBus: 35
Oxon Hill Road / John Hanson Lane	Bidirectional	Metrobus: D12; TheBus: 35
Saint Barnabas Road / Alice Avenue	Bidirectional	Metrobus: D12
Saint Barnabas Road / Larry Avenue	Eastbound	Metrobus: D12
Saint Barnabas Road / Rosecroft Village Drive	Westbound	Metrobus: D12
Saint Barnabas Road / Arts Drive	Eastbound	Metrobus: D12
Saint Barnabas Road / #5401	Westbound	Metrobus: D12
Owens Road / Wheeler Road	Bidirectional	TheBus: 33
Owens Road / Woodland Road	Bidirectional	TheBus: 33
Owens Road / Norlinda Avenue	Bidirectional	TheBus: 33
Owens Road / Martin Drive	Bidirectional	TheBus: 33
Owens Road / Weaver Terrace	Bidirectional	TheBus: 33
Owens Road / Barnaby Run Drive	Bidirectional	TheBus: 33
Owens Road / Kennebec Street	Bidirectional	Metrobus: P12; TheBus: 33
Owens Road / #1100	Bidirectional	Metrobus: P12; TheBus: 33
Iverson Street / Owens Road	Bidirectional	Metrobus: P12; TheBus: 33
Iverson Street / #1305	Eastbound	Metrobus: P12
Iverson Street / #1306	Westbound	Metrobus: P12
Iverson Street / Sutler Road	Bidirectional	Metrobus: P12
Southview Drive / #1510	Bidirectional	Metrobus: P12
Southview Drive / #1373	Bidirectional	Metrobus: P12
Southview Drive / #1333	Bidirectional	Metrobus: P12
Southview Drive / #1271	Bidirectional	Metrobus: P12
Southview Drive / #1224	Eastbound	Metrobus: P12
Southview Drive / #1125	Westbound	Metrobus: P12
Southview Drive / Southview Court	Bidirectional	Metrobus: P12
Southern Avenue / Chesapeake Street SE	Bidirectional	Metrobus: A6, A7, D12, D14, P12, P18, W14; TheBus: 33, 35, 37
Southern Avenue / 9th Street SE	Bidirectional	Metrobus: A6, A7, D12, D14, P12; TheBus: 33, 35, 37
Southern Avenue / Wheeler Road	Bidirectional	Metrobus: A2, A6, A7, D12, D14, P12; TheBus: 33, 35, 37
Southern Avenue / 13th Street SE	Bidirectional	Metrobus: A2, D12, D14, P12, P18, W2, W14; TheBus: 33, 35, 37
Southern Avenue / Forest Hills Apartments	Eastbound	Metrobus: A2, D12, D14, P12, W2; TheBus: 33, 35, 37
Southern Avenue / United Medical Center	Westbound	Metrobus: A2, D12, D14, P12, W2; TheBus: 33, 35, 37
Southern Avenue / #1380	Bidirectional	Metrobus: A2, D12, D14, P12, W2; TheBus: 33, 35, 37
Southern Avenue station Bus Bay M	Westbound station, Eastbound terminal	Metrobus: 32, A2, A32, D12, D14, P12, P18, W1, W2, W14; TheBus: 33, 35, 37; Washington Metro:

== History ==
=== Introduction of the NH1 ===
National Harbor opened on April 1, 2008 with the opening of the Gaylord National Resort & Convention Center and has since got more attractions like Tanger Outlets and the Capital Wheel through the years. Under the request of Gaylord and National Harbor, WMATA announced new service connecting Southern Avenue station to National Harbor with the new route NH1 beginning on March 23, 2008. The new route will operate 7 days a week between 6 AM and 10 PM every 20 minutes during rush hours and 30 minutes during other times. The state of Maryland pays $312,000 annually for the NH1 operations. In June 2008, Gaylord National Resort and Convention Center have asked Maryland to fund for additional transit service since employees found it difficult to reach National Harbor.

=== Reroute to Branch Ave ===
In August 2009 under the request of National Harbor, WMATA rerouted the NH1 to Branch Avenue station travelling along the Capital Beltway.

The changes caused controversy among workers as they will now have to travel out further on the Green Line to catch the NH1. Service was also deducted in the morning with buses now arriving past 8:00 AM on the weekends. Gaylord requested for WMATA to restore the original routing back to Southern Avenue station.

In response to the changes, Prince George's County created TheBus Route 35 to restore the connection between Southern Ave station and National Harbor.

=== Route NH3 ===
In December 2013, WMATA announced a new NH3 route to operate along the former NH1 service between Southern Avenue station and National Harbor during early mornings and late nights with new stops being added of the grand opening of Tanger Outlets Mall. It was also announced that both the NH1 and NH3 will operate via Harborview Avenue instead of National Avenue.

=== Changes ===
In 2014, WMATA announced a proposal to restore the NH1 routing to Southern Ave and to discontinue the NH3 completely being replaced by the NH1.

Another proposal was to reroute the NH1 along the Woodrow Wilson Bridge to serve King Street–Old Town station. This routing would later become route NH2 in 2016.

In June 2015, WMATA announced that the NH3 will be discontinued and replaced by the NH1. The NH1 would restore service to Southern Avenue station and will serve Southview Apartments. Service to Branch Avenue station would be discontinued.

Beginning on September 9, 2018, the St George Blvd & Waterfront St bus stop in National Harbor was discontinued and the NH1 along with the NH2 were rerouted to follow straight on National Harbor Blvd, turn right on Waterfront Street, and make a right turn onto St. George Blvd where it'll serve its current stop at Waterfront St & Potomac Passage. The reason WMATA made the reroute was since of traffic congestion along Downtown National Harbor (Waterfront St) and wanted to offer customers a more efficient trip. However it meant that both the NH1 & NH2 only served one stop at National Harbor.

During the COVID-19 pandemic, the line was reduced to operate on its weekend schedule beginning on March 16, 2020. Also beginning on March 21, 2020, all weekend service was suspended. Full service resumed on August 23, 2020.

=== Better Bus Redesign ===
In 2022, WMATA launched its Better Bus Redesign project, which aimed to redesign the entire Metrobus Network and is the first full redesign of the agency's bus network in its history.

In April 2023, WMATA launched its Draft Visionary Network. As part of the drafts, WMATA proposed to partially merge the NH1 with the P12. The new line would be named Route MD265 and would follow the P12 routing between Southern Avenue station and Eastover Shopping Center via Southern Avenue SE, Southview Drive, Iverson Street, Owens Road, Kennebec Street, Deal Drive, and Audrey Lane, but the route would turn onto Indian Head Highway, then operate on Livingston Road before serving Route D12's Birchwood City loop via Birchwood Drive, Galloway Drive, and Helmont Drive. Following the loop, the proposed route would continue to National Harbor via Livingston Road, Oxon Hill Park & Ride, Monument Avenue, National Harbor Boulevard, MGM National Harbor, MGM National Avenue (to Southern Avenue), and St. George Boulevard (to National Harbor). The current NH1 routing between Southern Avenue station and the intersection of St. Barnabas Road & Brinkley Road would be reworked into a TheBus route.

During WMATA's Revised Draft Visionary Network, WMATA merged the proposed Route MD265 with the proposed Route MD148 (the current P12 routing between Suitland station and Eastover Shopping Center) and renamed the route to the P93. The proposed P93 was to operate between Suitland station and National Harbor via the proposed Route MD148 routing (and current P12 routing) between Suitland station and Eastover Shopping Center, and the proposed Route MD265 routing between Southern Avenue station and National Harbor. The route would serve the Eastover Shopping Center, but would skip the Birchwood City loop with the proposed Route P96 taking it over instead. All changes were then proposed during WMATA's 2025 Proposed Network.

During the proposals, the Route P93 number would be changed to Route P94 and would operate the same routing as the original P93. The P93 was instead to operate up to Birchwood City via Birchwood Drive, Galloway Drive, and Helmont Drive.

On November 21, 2024, WMATA approved its Better Bus Redesign Network, with service on the College Park Line being simplified.

Beginning on June 29, 2025, Route NH1 was merged with the P12 and was renamed to the P94. The P94 operates along the former P12 routing between Suitland station and Eastover Shopping Center, then runs along Livingston Road before turning onto Saint Barnabas Road and operating on the NH1 routing to National Harbor. Service between Southern Avenue station and the intersection of St. Barnabas Road & Owens Road was replaced by TheBus Route P88.
