= Southern Avenue =

Southern Avenue may refer to:

In India:

- Southern Avenue (Kolkata)

In the United States:

- Southern Avenue (Washington, D.C.), forming part of the border with Maryland
- Southern Avenue (Washington Metro), a metro station in Prince George's County, Maryland
- Southern Avenue (band), an American five-piece blues and soul blues band from Memphis, Tennessee
