= NH1 =

NH1, or NH-1, or similar, may refer to:

- NH1 News, a New Hampshire based television and radio news network formerly aired on WBIN-TV and WNNH
- Howard NH-1, a World War II instrument training aircraft
- National Harbor Line (Route NH1), a WMATA bus line in Prince George's County, Maryland
- National Highway 1 (Cambodia)
- National Highway 1 (India)
- New Hampshire's 1st congressional district
