= Washington Metropolitan Area Transit Commission =

Passenger carrier regulatory agency

The Washington Metropolitan Area Transit Commission (WMATC) is a regulatory agency established by the Washington Metropolitan Area Regulation Compact, an interstate compact established between the Commonwealth of Virginia, the District of Columbia and the State of Maryland, and consented to by Congress under Public Law 86–794 in 1960 to regulate passenger common carriers operating within the District of Columbia, and the suburbs in Maryland and Virginia.

== Registration ==
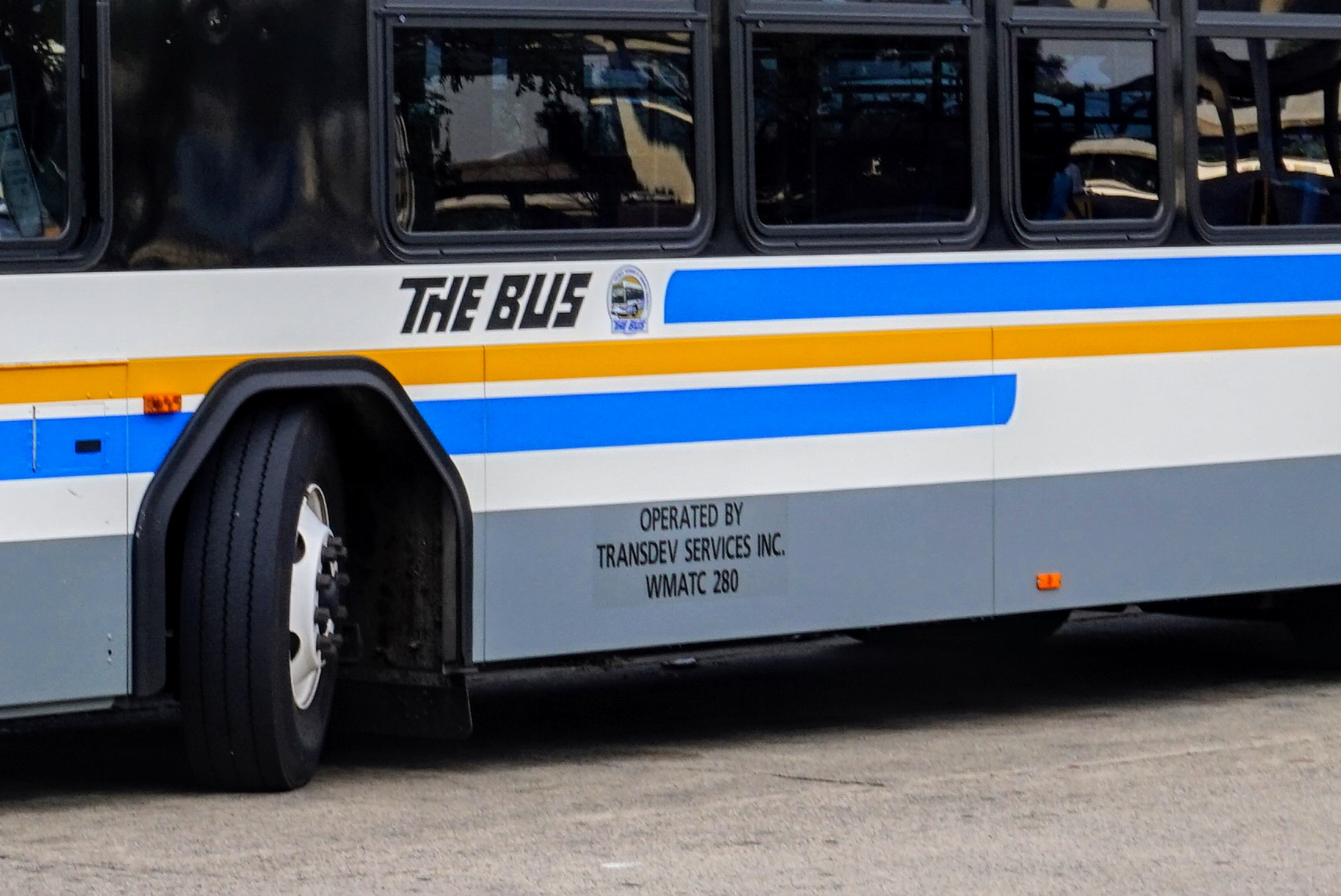
WMATC registration on a bus operated by Transdev for TheBus in Prince George's County, Maryland

A common carrier desiring to offer passenger transportation for hire within the "Metropolitan District" must register with the commission and obtain a WMATC number. This includes public bus systems owned by cities and counties in the region, which are managed and operated by a private company. Carriers directly operated by a state or a municipality within the region are exempt from registration. Carriers operating exclusively within Virginia are exempt from registration with WMATC as they would register with the Virginia State Corporation Commission.

Taxicab companies that operate vehicles carrying nine or fewer passengers (including the driver) are also exempt from registration with WMATC.

Being authorized by the commission and issued a WMATC number to operate vehicles means the organization does not have to register as a common carrier with the U.S. Department of Transportation if they operate exclusively within the Metropolitan District. Depending on the type of service, it may or may not have to also register with the District of Columbia Department of For-Hire Vehicles, the Virginia State Corporation Commission, and/or the Maryland Public Service Commission. WMATC serves as a single registration point for passenger common carriers operating within the "Metropolitan District," consisting of the District of Columbia; the cities of Alexandria and Falls Church, Arlington County and Fairfax County and the political subdivisions located within those counties, and that portion of Loudoun County occupied by Dulles International Airport; and Montgomery and Prince Georges Counties in Maryland and political subdivisions located within those counties.

== Requirements ==
The general requirement to obtain a WMATC number is similar to the U.S. Department of Transportation's requirement to obtain a DOT number, or most state Public Utilities Commissions to obtain a state registration number: submit a set of tariffs stating prices for services, pay a fee of about $500, and provide evidence of either a minimum of $1.5 million in insurance for carriers operating vehicles having 15 passengers or less (including the driver), or at least $5 million in insurance for carriers operating vehicles which can carry more than 15 persons.

As with any other registration system, the carrier posts its number on the outside of its vehicles in the form "WMATC 126".

WMATC should not be confused with the Washington Metropolitan Area Transit Authority (WMATA), which operates buses and trains for the City of Washington and its suburbs. WMATA is also exempt from regulation by WMATC.
