= Naylor Road station =

Washington Metro station

Coordinates: 38°51′4.1″N 76°57′22.7″W

Naylor Road
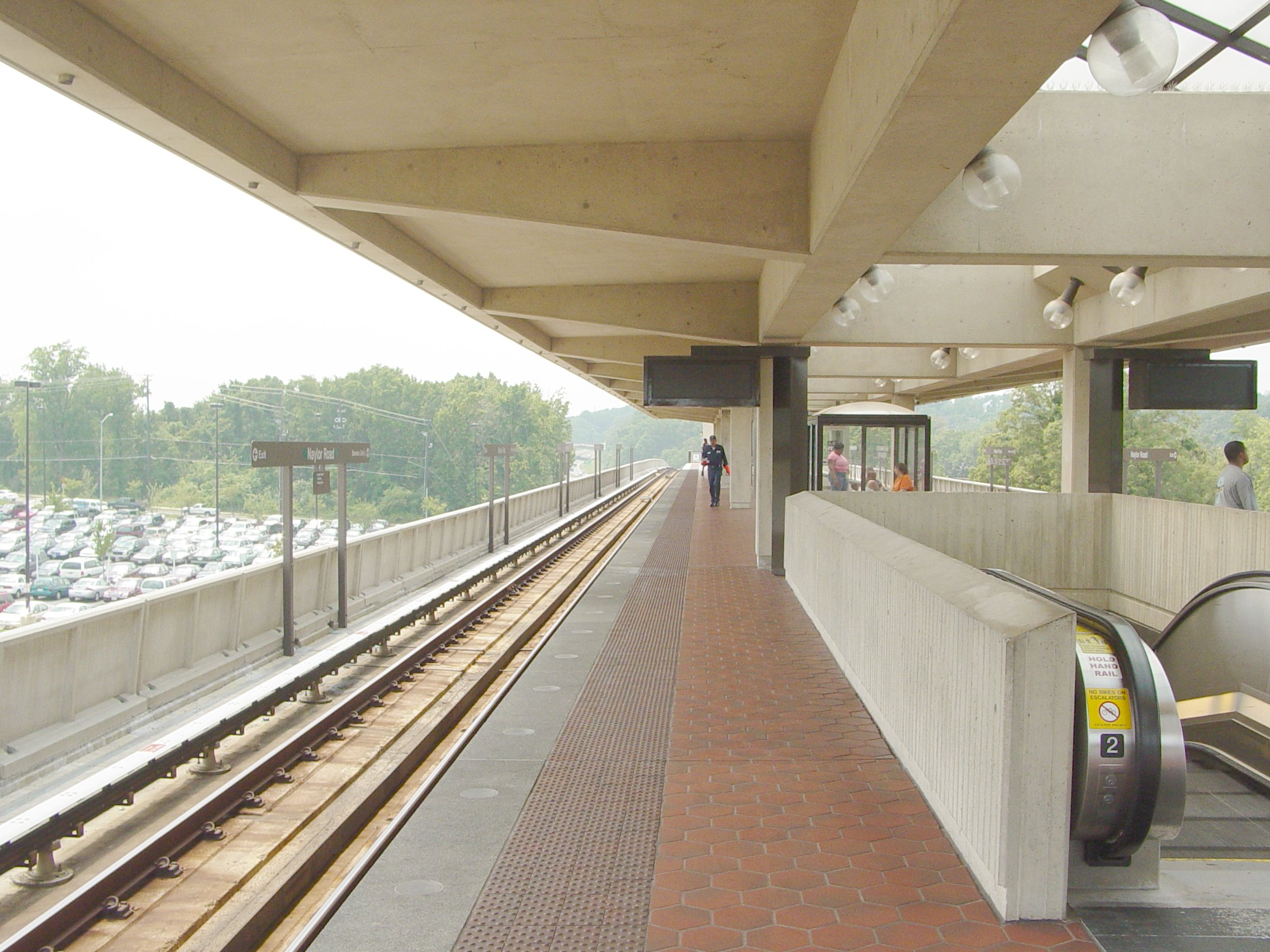
- Naylor Road station platform facing north in July 2004

General information
- Location: 3101 Branch Avenue; Temple Hills, Maryland
- Owner: Washington Metropolitan Area Transit Authority
- Platforms: 1 island platform
- Tracks: 2
- Connections: Metrobus: C27, C35, D1X, P63; GoPGC: P83, P86

Construction
- Structure type: Elevated
- Parking: 368 spaces
- Cycle facilities: 10 racks, 4 lockers
- Accessible: Yes

Other information
- Station code: F09

History
- Opened: January 13, 2001; 25 years ago

Passengers
- 2025: 1,311 (average weekday)
- Rank: 88 of 98

Services
Preceding station	Washington Metro	Following station
Suitland toward Branch Avenue	Green Line	Southern Avenue toward Greenbelt
Route map
Location

Naylor Road station is an island-platformed Washington Metro station in Hillcrest Heights, Maryland, United States. The station was opened on January 13, 2001, and is operated by the Washington Metropolitan Area Transit Authority (WMATA). Providing service for only the Green Line, the station is located between Naylor Road, Branch Avenue, and Suitland Parkway.

Groundbreaking for the final segment of the Green Line occurred on September 23, 1995, and the station opened on January 13, 2001. Its opening coincided with the completion of approximately 6.5 miles (10.5 km) of rail southeast of the Anacostia and the opening of the Branch Avenue, Congress Heights, Southern Avenue, and Suitland stations. The station won an award from the Portland Cement Association for its use of concrete.

== Station layout ==
The station has an elevated island platform southeast of the intersection between Suitland Parkway and Naylor Road. A parking lot is located south of the platform.
