= Southern Avenue-Fort Washington Line =

P97
- Southern Avenue-Fort Washington Line

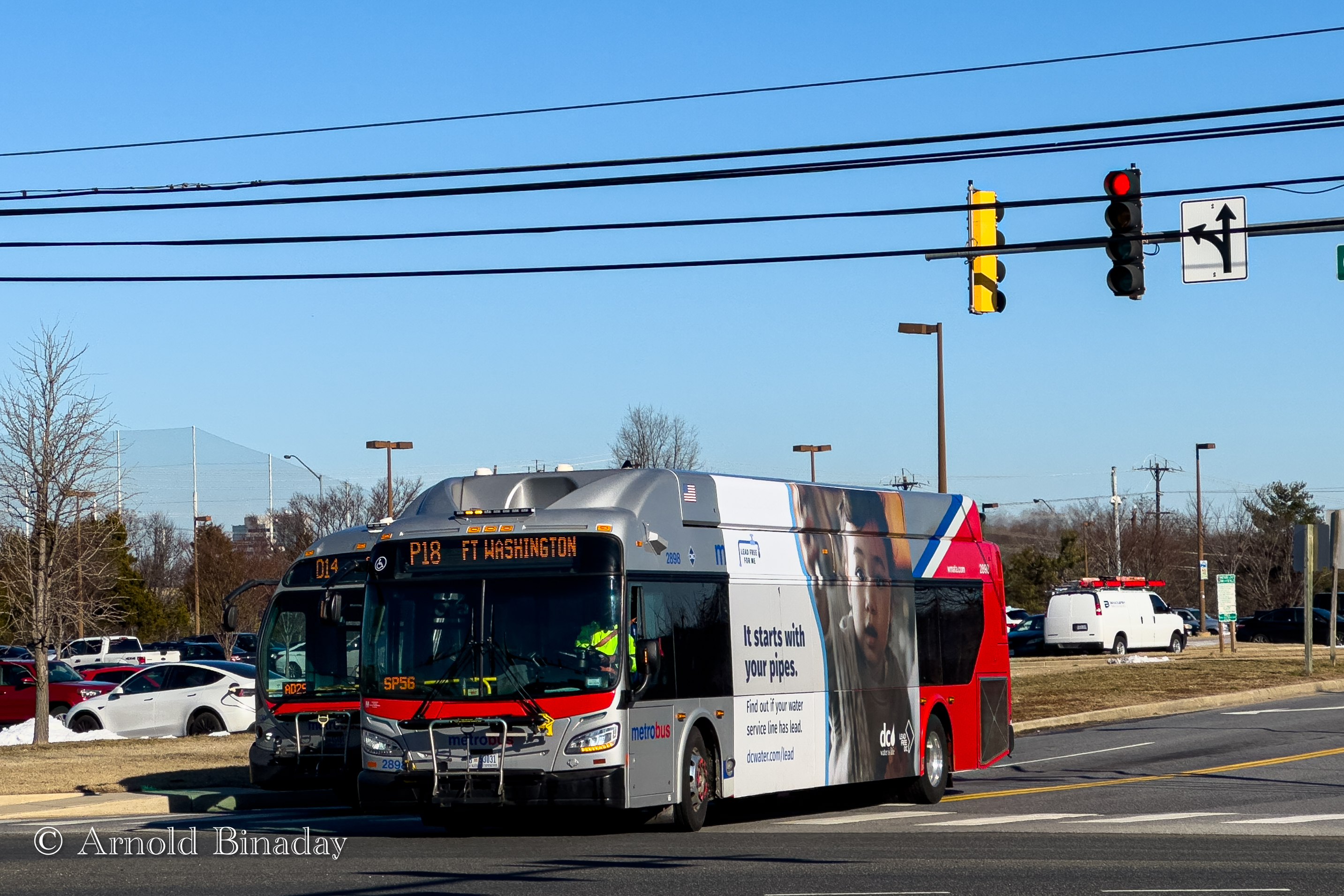
- Former Route P18 at Oxon Hill Park & Ride in February 2025

Overview
- System: Metrobus
- Operator: Washington Metropolitan Area Transit Authority
- Garage: Shepherd Parkway
- Livery: Local
- Status: In Service
- Predecessors: P17, P18, P19

Route
- Locale: Prince George's County
- Communities served: Fort Washington, Tantallon, Oxon Hill, Forest Heights, Temple Hills
- Landmarks served: Fort Foote, Oxon Hill Park & Ride Lot, Eastover
- Start: Fort Washington Park & Ride Lot
- Via: Oxon Hill Road, Indian Head Highway, Southern Avenue
- End: Southern Avenue station
- Length: 45 minutes

Service
- Level: Weekday service only
- Frequency: 20-30 minutes (Weekday Peak Hours); 60 minutes (Weekday midday)
- Operates: 4:32 AM - 7:30 PM
- Ridership: 186,401 (FY 2025)
- Transfers: SmarTrip only
- Timetable: Southern Avenue-Fort Washington Line

The Southern Avenue-Fort Washington Line, designated Route P97, is a weekday only bus route operated by the Washington Metropolitan Area Transit Authority between the Fort Washington Park & Ride Lot and Southern Avenue station of the Green Line of the Washington Metro. The line operates every 20-30 minutes during the weekday peak hours and 60 minutes during the weekday midday. Route P97 trips are roughly 45 minutes long.

== Background ==
Route P97 operates weekdays only between Fort Washington Park & Ride Lot and Southern Avenue station, mostly operating along Oxon Hill Road, Indian Head Highway, and Southern Avenue. Route P97 operates all day on weekdays. A limited stop segment runs between Southern Avenue station and Indian Head Highway at all times serving only 3 stops in each direction. Local service is provided by Routes C15, P93 and P94.

Route P97 operates out of Shepherd Parkway division.

=== P97 Stops ===
| Bus stop | Direction | Connections |
Prince George's County, Maryland
| Southern Avenue station Bus Bay N | Southbound station, Northbound terminal | Metrobus: C15, C29, D10, P93, P94; TheBus: P88, P95; Washington Metro: |
| Southern Avenue / 13th Street SE | Bidirectional | Metrobus: C15, C29, P93, P94; TheBus: P88, P95 |
| Southern Avenue / Chesapeake Street SE | Bidirectional | Metrobus: C15, P93, P94; TheBus: P88, P95 |
| Southern Avenue / 6th Street SE | Southbound | Metrobus: C15, C27; TheBus: P95 |
| Southern Avenue / South Capitol Street | Northbound | Metrobus: C11, C13, C15, C17, C27; TheBus: P95 |
| Indian Head Highway / Southern Avenue | Bidirectional | Metrobus: C11, C13, C15, C17, C27; TheBus: P95 |
| Indian Head Highway / Audrey Lane | Bidirectional | Metrobus: C11, C13, C17, P93, P94; TheBus: P95 |
| Indian Head Highway / Salisbury Drive | Northbound | Metrobus: C11, P93, P94; TheBus: P95 |
| Indian Head Highway / Talbert Drive | Southbound | Metrobus: C11, P93, P94; TheBus: P95 |
| Indian Head Highway / Livingston Road | Northbound | Metrobus: C11, P93, P94; TheBus: P95 |
| Indian Head Highway / Seneca Drive | Southbound | Metrobus: C11, P93, P94; TheBus: P95 |
| Indian Head Highway / I-95, I-495 | Bidirectional | Metrobus: C11; TheBus: P95 |
| Oxon Hill Park & Ride Lot Bus Bay D | Bidirectional | Metrobus: C11, P87, P90, P94, P96; TheBus: P95 |
| Oxon Hill Road / Harborview Avenue | Bidirectional | Metrobus: P96 |
| Oxon Hill Road / Oxon Hill Manor | Southbound | Metrobus: P96 |
| Oxon Hill Road / Tanger Outlets Main Entrance | Northbound | Metrobus: P96 |
| Oxon Hill Road / Pipers Glen Lane | Southbound | Metrobus: P96 |
| Oxon Hill Road / Brockton Road | Northbound | Metrobus: P96 |
| Oxon Hill Road / Abbington Drive | Bidirectional | Metrobus: P96 |
| Oxon Hill Road / Claudia Drive | Bidirectional | Metrobus: P96 |
| Oxon Hill Road / Kerby Parkway | Bidirectional | |
| Fort Foote Road / River Bend Road | Bidirectional | |
| Fort Foote Road / River Wood Drive | Bidirectional | |
| Fort Foote Road / Potomac Valley Drive | Southbound | |
| Fort Foote Road / Loughran Road | Northbound | |
| Fort Foote Road / East Fort Foote Terrace | Southbound | |
| Fort Foote Road / Bluffwood Lane | Bidirectional | |
| Fort Foote Road / Bluffwood Lane | Northbound | |
| Fort Foote Road / Fortside Driveway | Southbound | |
| Fort Foote Road / Lark Lane | Bidirectional | |
| Fort Foote Road / Ivanhoe Road | Northbound | |
| Fort Foote Road / Sandy Bar Drive | Southbound | |
| Fort Foote Road / Loughran Road | Northbound | |
| Fort Foote Road / Wedgewood Drive | Southbound | |
| Fort Foote Road / Indian Queen Elementary School | Southbound | |
| Fort Foote Road / Round Table Drive | Northbound | |
| Fort Foote Road / Traverse Way | Southbound | |
| Fort Foote Road / Messina Drive | Northbound | |
| Fort Foote Road / Shady Tree Court | Southbound | |
| Fort Foote Road / Stony Hill Drive | Northbound | |
| Oxon Hill Road / Livingston Road | Bidirectional | |
| Livingston Road / Fort Washington Road | Bidirectional | |
| Fort Washington Road / #11310 | Bidirectional | |
| Fort Washington Road / Riverview Road | Bidirectional | |
| Fort Washington Road / Kimberly Woods Lane | Bidirectional | |
| Fort Washington Road / Beech Street | Bidirectional | |
| Fort Washington Road / Autumnwood Lane | Southbound | |
| Fort Washington Road / Lourdes Drive | Northbound | |
| Fort Washington Road / Swan Creek Road | Bidirectional | |
| Fort Washington Road / Rexburg Avenue | Bidirectional | |
| Fort Washington Road / Tantallon Drive | Bidirectional | |
| Tantallon Drive / Asbury Drive | Bidirectional | |
| Tantallon Drive / Buckmaster Lane | Bidirectional | |
| Gable Lane / Tantallon Drive | Bidirectional | |
| Gable Lane / Merek Place | Bidirectional | |
| Fort Washington Park & Ride Lot Bus Bay A | Northbound station, Southbound terminal | TheBus: P95 |

== History ==
Before WMATA implemented the Better Bus Redesign network, Route P97 was previously known as Route P18. The line was created during the 1970s in order to provide service to Downtown DC to Fort Washington. Routes P17, P18, and P19 were created to run the new Oxon Hill–Fort Washington Line. Routes P17 and P19 operated during the weekday peak-hours between Fort Washington Park & Ride Lot and Farragut Square via Oxon Hill Road, Indian Head Highway, and South Capitol Street. Route P18 operated between Fort Washington Park & Ride Lot and Bolling Air Force Base. Routes P17 and P19 operated during weekday peak-hours in the peak direction while route P18 operated during the weekday midday.

Routes P17 and P18 operates along Tantallon Drive, Swan Creek Road, Gable Lane and Fort Foote Road while route P19 remains straight along Oxon Hill Road, making it more direct. Routes P17 and P19 operates a limited stop segment between the Oxon Hill Park & Ride and Washington DC and had several boarding and alighting restrictions to passengers.

On December 28, 1991, route P18 was diverted along Firth Sterling Avenue to serve Anacostia station when it opened.

On January 13, 2001, route P19 was rerouted between Fort Washington and Oxon Hill Park & Ride lots to operate via East Swan Creek, Fort Washington, Livingston and Oxon Hill Roads. Routes P17 and P18 were not affected.

In 2014 during WMATA's FY2015 budget, WMATA proposed to reroute P18 to Southern Avenue station via Southern Avenue in order to improve connectivity in southern Prince George's County and to Shifting to Southern Avenue Station will help alleviate crowding at Anacostia station. Another option was to transfer the P18 to TheBus and being rerouted to Southern Avenue station.

Also WMATA proposed to eliminate existing boarding and alighting restrictions and instead create a limited stop segment between the Oxon Hill Park & Ride and South Capitol & O Streets for routes P17 and P19 because the existing boarding and alighting restrictions are confusing for passengers and operators and creating a limited stop segment would preserve the “express” nature of the route in a more easy to understand way.

On June 21, 2015, route P18 was diverted along Southern Avenue to serve Southern Avenue station discontinuing service to Anacostia station. Routes P17 and P19 also discontinue the boarding and alighting restrictions and instead had a limited stop segment created between the Oxon Hill Park & Ride and South Capitol & O Streets.

During WMATA's FY2018 budget, WMATA proposed to either eliminate the entire line or discontinue service to Downtown DC being rerouted to Southern Avenue station. WMATA would also charge the local fare for routes P17 and P19 as express service would be discontinued if it was rerouted to Southern Avenue. This was to reduce costs and it has a high subsidy per rider. Performance measures for WMATA goes as the following:

| Performance Measure | Routes P17, P18, P19 | WMATA Guideline | Pass/Fail |
|---|---|---|---|
| Average Weekday Riders | 1,167 | 432 | Pass |
| Cost Recovery | 32.33% | 16.6% | Pass |
| Subsidy per Rider | $6.68 | $4.81 | Fail |
| Riders per Trip | 21.3 | 10.7 | Pass |
| Riders per Revenue Mile | 1.3 | 1.3 | Pass |

The line would later be saved in 2017.

Beginning on June 25, 2017, service to Downtown DC was discontinued. Route P19 was rerouted along Southern Avenue to serve Southern Avenue station alongside route P18, keeping its same routing between Oxon Hill Park & Ride and Fort Washington Park & Ride. Route P17 was discontinued and replaced by route P18 which added weekday peak hour service in both directions. P19 would still operate in the weekday peak-hour direction during the changes. Express fares for route P19 was also discontinued and the limited stop segment was also discontinued due to all trips becoming local.

Beginning on August 7, 2017, in response to customer feedback, routes P18, P19, and W14 implemented a new limited stop segment along Southern Avenue between Southern Avenue station and Indian Head Highway serving only three stops in each direction. Local service is provided by routes A6, A7, D12, D13, D14, NH1, and P12.

All service was suspended during the COVID-19 pandemic beginning on March 22, 2020. Route P18 resumed service on August 23, 2020, adding peak direction service, but Route P19 remained suspended.

On September 26, 2020, WMATA proposed to eliminate all route P19 service and replace them with route P18 due to low federal funding. Route P19 has not operated since March 17, 2020 due to Metro's response to the COVID-19 pandemic. By September 5, 2021, the P19 was no longer listed on WMATA's website.

In 2024 during WMATA's FY2024 Budget crisis, WMATA proposed to eliminate all P18 service. However on April 25, 2024, Metro’s Board of Directors approved a $4.8 billion capital and operating budget which avoided service cuts.

=== Better Bus Redesign ===
In 2022, WMATA launched its Better Bus Redesign project, which aimed to redesign the entire Metrobus Network and is the first full redesign of the agency's bus network in its history.

In April 2023, WMATA launched its Draft Visionary Network. As part of the drafts, WMATA proposed to modify the P18 in Fort Washington and reroute the route from the intersection of Livingston Road & Fort Washington Road to operate via Livingston Road, Washington Lane, Old Fort Road, Lampton Lane, Tantallon Drive, Fort Washington Road, and Swan Creek Road to Fort Washington Park & Ride instead of operating via Fort Washington Road, Tantallon Drive, and Gable Lane. The line was named Route MD377 in the drafts. WMATA also proposed to add weekend service to the MD377.

During WMATA's Revised Draft Visionary Network, WMATA renamed the MD377 to Route P97 and had the routing the same as the current P18, except service would operate via Fort Washington Road, Tantallon Drive, and Gable Lane to Fort Washington Park & Ride. However, weekend service would not be included in the new Route P97. The change was then proposed during WMATA's 2025 Proposed Network.

On November 21, 2024, WMATA approved its Better Bus Redesign Network.

Beginning on June 29, 2025, Route P18 was renamed to Route P97, keeping the same routing from the current P18.

== Incidents ==
- On November 27, 2015, at around 1:55 PM, a man was hit by a P18 bus at the intersection of Southern Avenue SE, and Indian Head Highway suffering serious injuries.
- On September 28, 2017, a P18 bus stalled and lost all power to the bus causing it to crash. The accident lead to WMATA pulling its 105 NABI 42-BRT buses from revenue service for two months.
