= GoPGC =

Public transit service in Prince George's County, Maryland

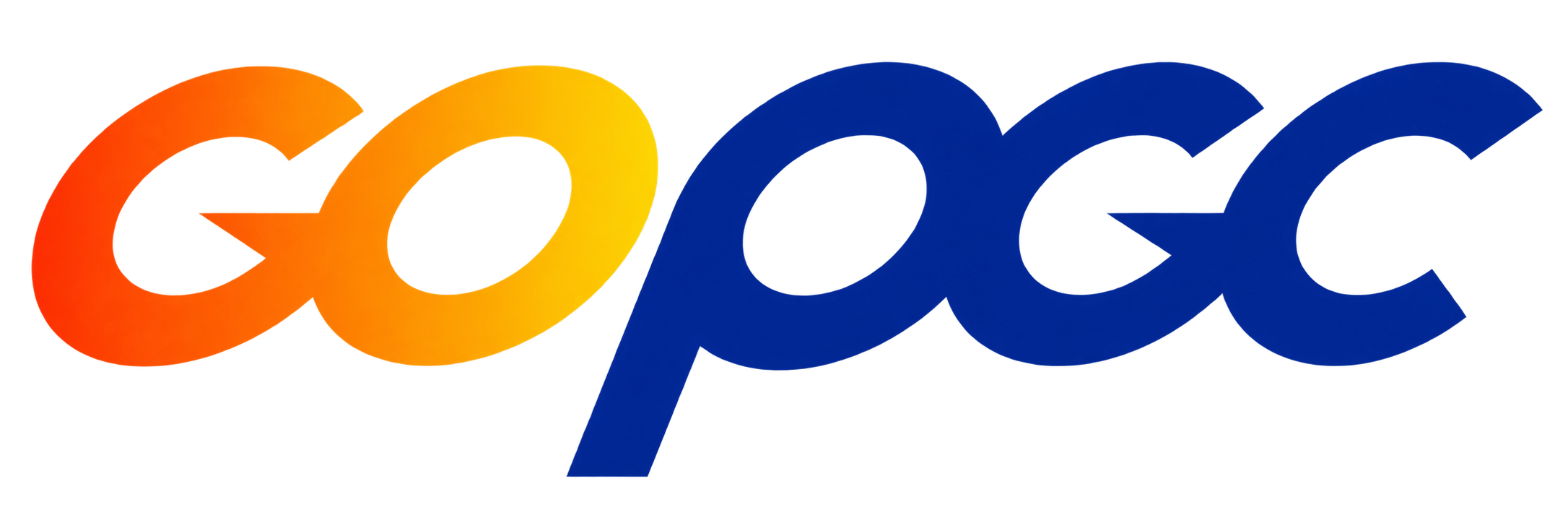

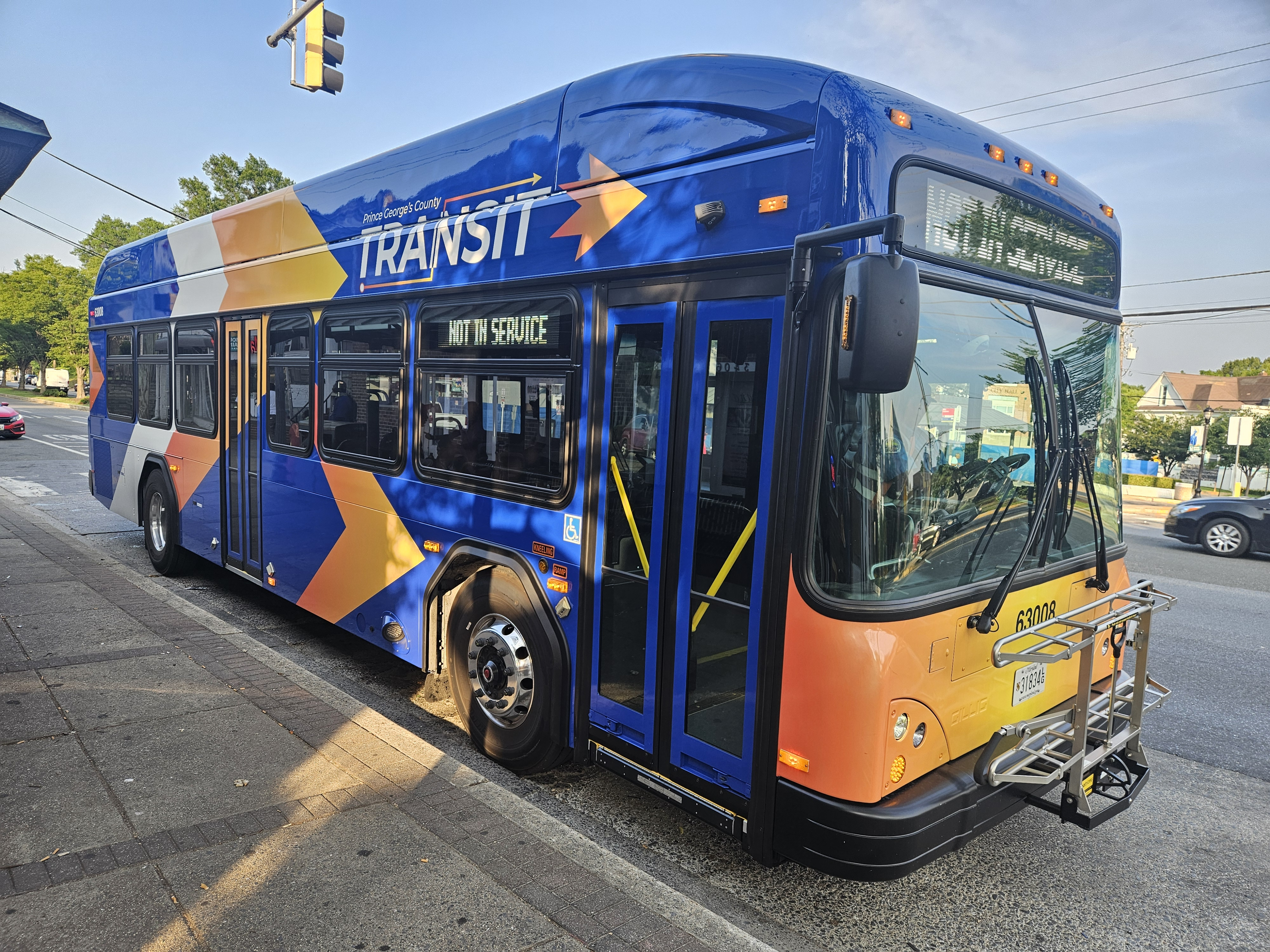
- A GoPGC bus at Mount Rainier Terminal
- Founded: January 1990; 36 years ago
- Service area: Prince George's County, Maryland, US
- Service type: Bus service
- Routes: 24
- Fleet: Gillig, ENC, Proterra
- Daily ridership: 12,700 (2026)
- Annual ridership: 2,441,500
- Fuel type: Diesel
- Operator: RATP Dev (WMATC 3226)
- Website: GoPGC

GoPGC (stylized as GO PGC) is a bus transportation system serving Prince George's County, Maryland. There are 24 bus routes, with most operating between Washington Metro stations in the county, with two routes running to Upper Marlboro. In 2025, the system had a ridership of 2,441,500 or about 15,100 per weekday as of the second quarter of 2026.

The service was originally known as "The Bus" until 2025, when rebranding saw the name shortened to "Prince George's County Transit", and rebranded again in 2026 to GoPGC.

== History ==
The idea for Prince George's County establishing its own transit system was initially brought up in 1986, to provide better transportation access to the Upper Marlboro Courthouse and other important government offices, that were isolated from the WMATA Metrorail and Metrobus system. At the time, WMATA charged counties the costs of operating some routes, because regional routes were not profitable due to lower ridership. Prince George's County decided it would be cheaper for the county to operate their own transit system instead. Prince George's County learned to watch Montgomery County, which successfully developed its own Ride On transit system in March 1975 in response to WMATA asking the county to pay for routes operating in Montgomery County. Prince George's County's TheBus system was created in January 1990.

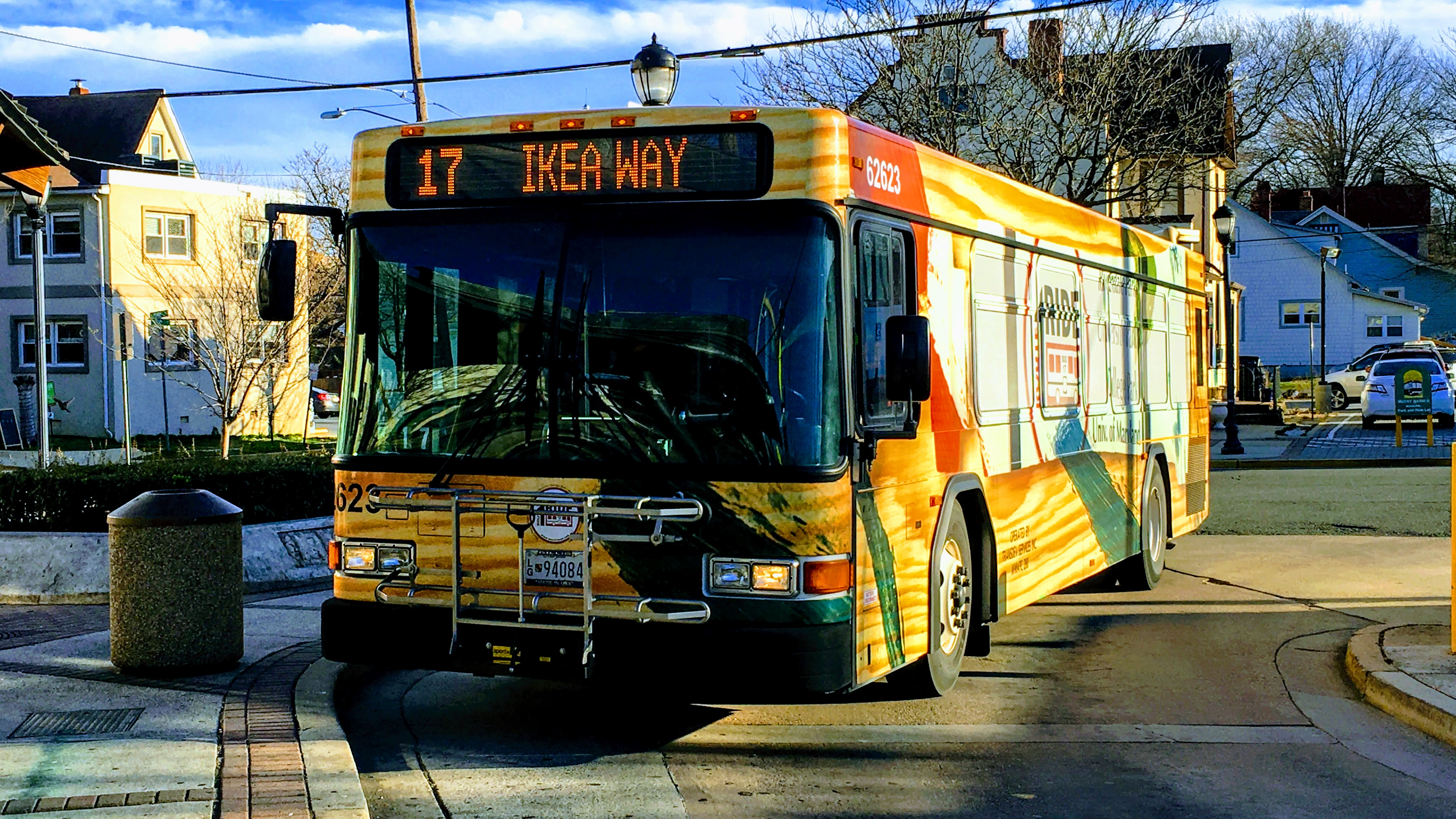
Gillig LF Diesel in Route US 1 Ride Wrap on The Bus Route 17: Mount Rainier

The first two routes that Prince George's County started off operating were routes 20 and 21. Route 20 would operate between Addison Road station and the Upper Marlboro Courthouse. Route 21, on the other hand, would operate between the New Carrollton station (WMATA's Orange Line's northern terminus in Prince George's County) and the Equestrian Center, also serving the Upper Marlboro Courthouse. After observing the success of these two routes, Prince George's County decided to add four new routes in April 1996 to serve residential areas being built around WMATA's northern Green Line stations in Prince George's County, which opened in December 1993. These new routes served areas somewhat already served by WMATA, providing additional transportation service to residents and business there. Even more routes were added as several Metro Green Line stations opened in January 2001 and in December 2004 when Morgan Boulevard and the Largo Town Center stations on the Blue Line opened.

On November 7, 2020, TheBus launched Saturday service on several routes, marking the first time that service was not restricted to weekdays in the agency's then-30-year history. All Saturday routes would operate every 30–45 minutes between 6:00 AM and 6:00 PM.

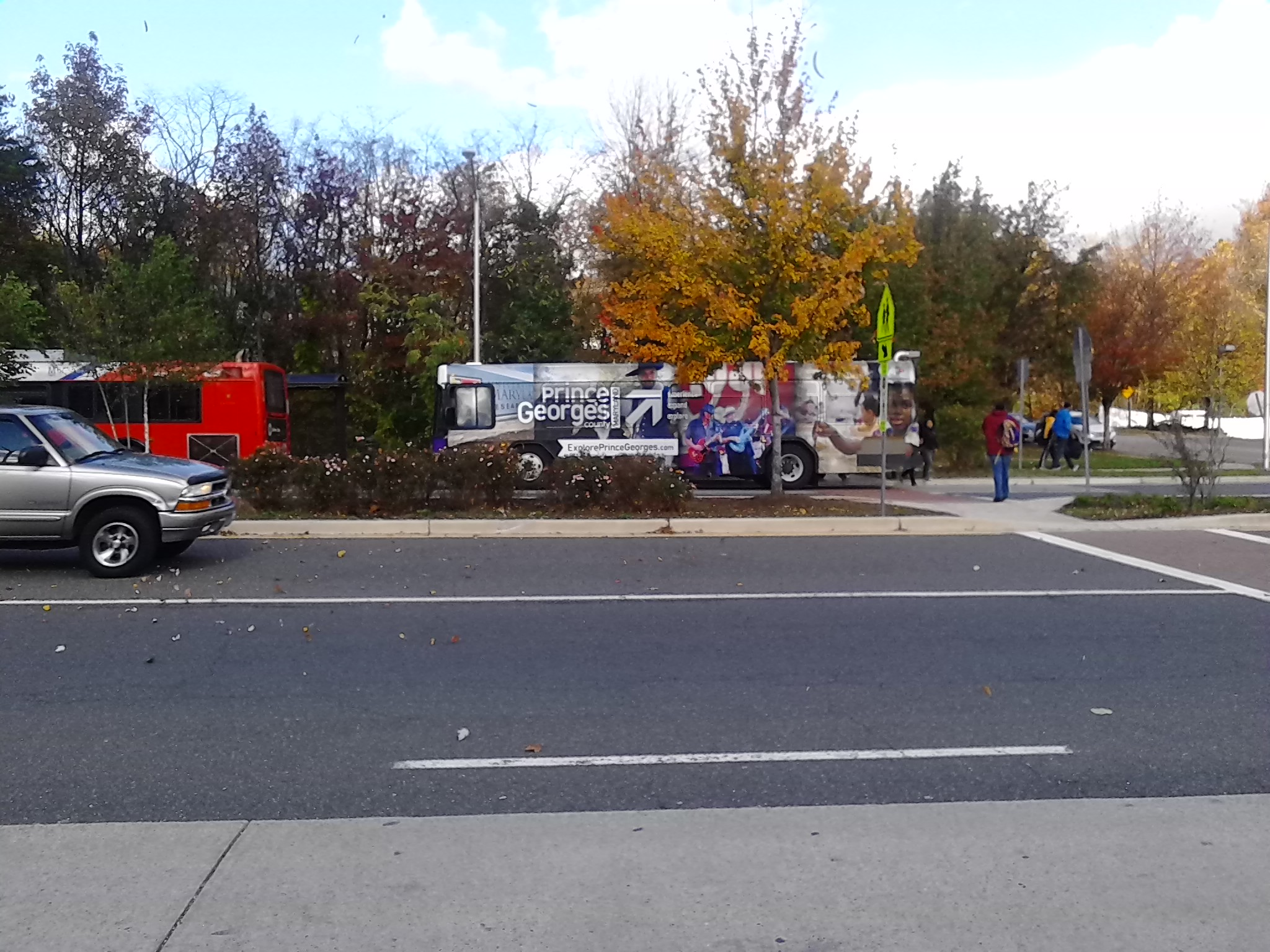
A new version of The Bus Route 21X: Prince George's Community College

In 2023, TheBus partnered with Metrobus to redesign its current network dubbed as Better Bus. After months of proposals, on November 21, 2024, WMATA approved its Better Bus Network Redesign, which began in 2022. All TheBus routes were renamed into P routes. At the same time, TheBus changed its name to Prince George's County Transit.

In May 2026, Prince George's County Transit announced they would launch new Sunday service beginning on June 14, 2026, on five different bus routes. They had long been criticized for being the only bus operator serving a county fully or partially within the Beltway to have no Sunday service, and they had no weekend service at all before Saturday service launched in 2020.

On August 24, 2026, Prince George's County Transit TheBus announced they will rebrand to GoPGC on September 2, 2026 after a 36-year run being branded and known as TheBus since its initial launch in January 1990.

== Authority ==
While a bus service operated in the Maryland suburbs of Washington, D.C., by Metrobus, or a local or state government in Maryland, is not required to have an Operating Authority from the Washington Metropolitan Area Transit Commission, such authorization is required for a service operated by a non-government agency. Because GoPGC is operated by RATP Dev, under a contract with Prince George's County, it has operating authorization as WMATC 3226.

== Routes ==
All routes operate on Weekdays with select routes operating on Saturdays and Sundays. Service usually ends around 6:30 pm on most routes with some routes ending at 8:00 pm. Sunday service on select routes began on June 14, 2026. GoPGC does not operate on New Year's Day, Memorial Day, Independence Day, Labor Day, Thanksgiving Day, and Christmas Day.

All routes listed below began service on June 30, 2025.

| Route | Name | Terminals | | Major streets | Service Notes | History |
|---|---|---|---|---|---|---|
| P19 | Greenbelt - Laurel | Greenbelt station | Laurel Town Center | Baltimore Avenue; Konterra Drive; Contee Road; Laurel-Bowie Road | Weekday peak hours service only | Began service on June 3, 2024; Existing routing of the former Route 61. |
| P22 | Greenbelt - Cheverly | Greenbelt station | Cheverly station | Good Luck Road; Hanover Parkway; Greenbelt Road; Cherrywood Lane; Annapolis Road | Weekday trips from Greenbelt alternate ending between New Carrollton and Cheverly.; Weekend service operates between Greenbelt and New Carrollton only. | Combination of a modified Route 16 routing and WMATA Metrobus Route F13 between Cheverly and New Carrollton.; Sunday service began on June 14, 2026. |
| P23 | New Carrollton - Fairwood | New Carrollton station | Bowie Medical Center | Whitfield Chapel Road; Annapolis Road | Operates Monday-Friday Only. | Combination of former WMATA Metrobus Routes B24 and F13. |
| P2X | Greenbelt - New Carrollton Express | Greenbelt station | New Carrollton station | Greenbelt Road; Cipriano Road; Annapolis Road | Weekday peak hours service only | Existing routing of the former Route 15X. |
| P37 | College Park - Adelphi | College Park station | Adelphi | Adelphi Road; Campus Drive | Weekday peak hours service only. | Replaced former WMATA Metrobus Route C8 portion between College Park and Adelphi. |
| P43 | Takoma Langley - Addison Road | Takoma Langley Crossroads Transit Center | Addison Road station | University Boulevard; East-West Highway; Queens Chapel Road; Annapolis Road; Columbia Park Road; Martin Luther King Jr. Highway | | Existing routing of the former Route 18.; Sunday service began on June 14, 2026. |
| P44 | New Carrollton - Downtown Largo | New Carrollton station | Downtown Largo station | Pennsy Drive; Landover Road; Kent Village Drive; Sheriff Road; Brightseat Road | Operates Monday-Friday Only | Combination of the former Route 27 between Downtown Largo and Palmer Park, and a modified routing of the former WMATA Metrobus Route F12 between Kent Village and New Carrollton. |
| P52 | New Carrollton - Upper Marlboro | New Carrollton station | Upper Marlboro Courthouse | Garden City Drive; Ardwick-Ardmore Road; Lottsford Road; Largo Road | Operates Monday-Saturday Only | Existing routing of the former Route 21. |
| P54 | Cheverly - Addison Road | Cheverly station | Addison Road station | Columbia Park Road; Cabin Branch Drive; Sheriff Road; Nalley Road; Central Avenue | Operates Monday-Saturday Only. | Existing routing of the former Route 23 with service along Walker Mill Drive being replaced by Route P56. |
| P56 | Addison Road - Downtown Largo | Addison Road station | Downtown Largo station | Morgan Boulevard; Hampton Park Boulevard; Ritchie-Marlboro Road; Harry S. Truman Drive; Campus Way South; Largo Road | Saturday trips operate between Downtown Largo and Morgan Boulevard only.; Operates Monday-Saturday Only. | Existing routing of the former Route 26 with an extension to Addison Road via Central Avenue and Walker Mill Drive. |
| P57 | Downtown Largo - Woodmore/Jericho | Downtown Largo station | Woodmore Town Centre | Largo Drive West; Lottsford Road; Medical Center Drive; McCormick Drive; Campus Way North | Operates Monday-Friday Only. | Existing routing of the former Route 28. |
| P5X | New Carrollton - PGCC Express | New Carrollton station | Prince George's Community College | Garden City Drive; Ardwick-Ardmore Road; Landover Road; Campus Way | Weekday peak hours service only | Existing routing of the former Route 21X. |
| P64 | Suitland - Downtown Largo | Downtown Largo station | Suitland station | Brightseat Road; Hampton Park Boulevard; Ritchie Road; Silver Hill Road | | Modified Routing of the former Route 24 between Forestville and Central Avenue (Eastern Half), with the terminus moved to Downtown Largo, and combined with former WMATA Metrobus Route K12 between Penn Mar Shopping Center and Suitland station.; Route 24 now serves Central Avenue, Hampton Park Boulevard, and Edgeworth Drive, swapping the original routing with Route 26.; Sunday service began on June 14, 2026. |
| P65 | Capitol Heights - Forestville | Capitol Heights station | Penn Mar Shopping Center | Rollins Avenue; Walker Mill Road; Forestville Road | Operates Monday-Saturday Only | Existing Routing of the former Route 24 between Forestville and Capitol Heights station (Western Half). |
| P71 | New Carrollton - Bowie | New Carrollton station | Bowie State University | John Hanson Highway; Laurel-Bowie Road | Operates Monday-Friday Only | Modified Routing of the former WMATA Metrobus Routes B21, B22, and B24. |
| P76 | Addison Road - Upper Marlboro | Addison Road station | Upper Marlboro Courthouse | Addison Road; Marlboro Pike; Old Marlboro Pike; Main Street | Every other weekday trip and all Saturday trips bypass Melwood Training Center.; Operates Monday-Saturday Only. | Existing routing of the former Route 20. |
| P77 | Villages of Marlborough - Marlboro Meadows | Village Drive West | Correctional Center | Village Drive West; Marlboro Pike; Old Marlboro Pike | Operates Monday-Friday Only | Existing routing of the former Route 53. |
| P78 | Equestrian Center/Courthouse | Equestrian Center | | Water Street | Operates Monday-Friday Only | Existing routing of the former Route 51X. |
| P83 | Naylor Road - Suitland | Naylor Road station | Capital Crossing Apartments | Suitland Road; Silver Hill Road; Iverson Street; 23rd Parkway | Operates Monday-Friday Only | Existing routing of the former Route 34 and combined with former WMATA Metrobus Route C12 between The Shops at Iverson and Naylor Road station. |
| P84 | Branch Avenue - Brandywine | Brandywine Crossing | Branch Avenue station | Brandywine Road; Crain Highway | Operates Monday-Saturday Only | Existing routing of the former Route 36 with an extension to Branch Avenue station. |
| P85 | Branch Avenue - Southern Maryland Hospital Center | Branch Avenue station | Southern Maryland Hospital | Auth Road; Allentown Road; Temple Hill Road; Piscataway Road | Operates Monday-Saturday Only | Modified routing of the former Route 30. |
| P86 | Naylor Road - Clinton | Naylor Road station | Clinton Park & Ride | 28th Parkway; Temple Hill Road; Brinkley Road; Coventry Way; Woodyard Road | | Combination routing of the former Route 32 and former WMATA Metrobus Route H12.; Sunday service began on June 14, 2026. |
| P88 | Southern Avenue - Branch Avenue | Southern Avenue station | Branch Avenue station | Southern Avenue; Owens Road; Brinkley Road; Allentown Road; Auth Road | | Existing routing of the former Route 33.; Sunday service began on June 14, 2026. |
| P95 | Southern Avenue - Friendly | Southern Avenue station | Fort Washington Park & Ride Lot; Friendly (Allentown & Old Fort Roads); Southern Regional Technology and Recreation Complex | Bock Road; Southern Avenue | Service to Fort Washington operates weekday peak hours only (AM to Southern Avenue, PM to Fort Washington); Every other weekday peak hour trip and weekday midday trip operates between Southern Avenue and Friendly only.; Saturday service only operates between Southern Avenue and Southern Regional Technology and Recreation Complex; Operates Monday-Saturday Only | Modified routing of the former Route 35 combined with WMATA Metrobus Route W14.; Via MGM National Harbor |

=== GoPGC Link ===
In addition to fixed-route buses, TheBus system also includes microtransit service. Rides cost $2 and must be booked and paid with the TransLoc app.

== Fare ==
The use of the buses has been free since June 30, 2025. The fare was $1.25, but seniors, the disabled, and students (between 2:00PM and 7:00PM) riding free. On October 13, 2008, TheBus began accepting payment using SmarTrip regional farecards.

== Fleet ==
Vehicles used in the fleet are manufactured by Proterra (now Phoenix Motorcars), Gillig Corporation, Eldorado National (now ENC), Ford and New Flyer.

| Photo | Builder and model name | Model year | Length | Numbers (Total) | Engines | Transmission | Notes |
|---|---|---|---|---|---|---|---|
| | New Flyer DE40LFA | 2009-2010 | 40 ft (12.19 m) | 63080, 63082-63087, 63090-63091 (9 buses) | Cummins ISL EPA 2007 | Allison EP40 | Ex-WMATA units, acquired in 2024-2025; 63089 Was retired from service. |
| | New Flyer DE41LFR | 2009 | 40 ft (12.19 m) | 63093-63097 (5 buses) | Cummins ISL EPA 2007 | Allison EP40 | Ex-MTA Maryland units, acquired in 2024-2025; Only 63093, 63095, 63096 are active; 63093 is ex-MTA Maryland 09044; 63095 is ex-MTA Maryland 09050 |
| | Gillig Low Floor | 2010–2012 | 35 ft (10.67 m) | 63188–63217, 62616, 62623–62628, 62633–62652 (68 buses) | Cummins ISL9 EPA 2010 | Voith DIWA D864.5 | Several units retired |
| | Gillig Low Floor | 2011–2012 | 29 ft (8.839 m) | 62617–62622, 62629–62632 (10 buses) | Cummins ISL9 EPA 2010 | Voith DIWA D864.5 | |
| | Ford E4-50 | 2019 | 22.5 ft (6.86 m) | 62812-62813 (2 buses) | 6.8L V10 | 6-speed automatic | |
| | ElDorado National Axess BRT | 2019 | 35 ft (10.67 m) | 63011–63016 (6 buses) | Cummins L9 EPA 2017 | Allison B400R6 | |
| | ElDorado National E-Z Rider II BRT | 2020 | 35 ft (10.67 m) | 63032–63036 (5 buses) | Cummins L9 EPA 2017 | Allison B300R6 | |
| | Gillig BRT | 2020 | 29 ft (8.839 m) | 63017–63031, 63037–63045 (23 buses) | Cummins L9 EPA 2017 | Allison B300R6 | |
| | Proterra Catalyst | 2021 | 35 ft (10.67 m) | 63052–63055 (4 buses) | UQM HD220 | Eaton EEV-7202 2-speed auto | First Electric buses ordered for TheBus; All Units Withdrawn from service due to Proterra's Bankruptcy |
| | Proterra ZX5 | 2022 | 35 ft (10.67 m) | 63056–63063 (8 buses) | UQM HD220 | Eaton EEV-7202 2-speed auto | Only 63062-63063 & 63056 remain in service as a result of Proterra's Bankruptcy |
| | ElDorado National E-Z Rider II BRT | 2022 | 30 ft (9.144 m) | 63064–63069 (6 buses) | Cummins B6.7 EPA 2021 | Allison B300R6 | |
| | Ford F-550 Allstar XL | 2022 | 30-32 ft (8.53 to 9.75 m) | 63070-63073 (4 buses) | 7.3L V8 | 10-speed automatic | |
| | Gillig Low Floor Plus | 2025 | 35 ft (10.67 m) | 63001-63010, 63046-63047 (12 buses) | Cummins L9 EPA 2024 | Allison B400R6 | Delivered in a new Navy, White and Orange Livery as part of the bus network redesign. |
| | Gillig Low Floor Plus EV | 2025/2026 | 35 ft (10.67 m) | 63048-63051, 63075-63076-63077-79 63088, 63098-99 (12 buses) | Cummins BES | Direct-Drive | Delivered in a new Navy, White and Orange Livery as part of the bus network redesign. |
| | Gillig Low Floor Plus | 2026 | 35 ft (10.67 m) | 66400-66403? (4 buses) | Cummins L9 EPA 2024 | Allison B400R6 | Delivered in a new Navy, White, Orange and Yellow Livery as part of GoPGC redesign; 66400, 66402-66403 are delivered; Only 66401 is in service; Total amount of units orderded unknown |

=== On order ===
| Manufacturer | Model | Length | Year built | Fleet Numbers (quantity) | Fuel | Notes |
|---|---|---|---|---|---|---|
| N/A | N/A | N/A | | N/A | N/A | Ex-WMATA buses?; TBD, (7/26) |

=== Retired Fleet ===
| Year | Builder and model name | Numbers (preserved numbers) | Year Retired | Engine | Transmission | Picture | Notes |
|---|---|---|---|---|---|---|---|
| Unknown | Thomas Dennis SLF | 63128–63130 | Unknown | | | | |
| 1990 | Flxible Metro B | 9485, 9493, 9497 | Unknown | Cummins L10 | Voith DIWA D863.3 | | Ex-WMATA buses, acquired between 2006 and 2007 |
| 1996 | Gillig Phantom 35' | 62895–62899 | Unknown | Detroit Diesel Series 50 | Unknown | | |
| 1996–97 | Champion Contender | 62922–62935 | Unknown | Unknown | Unknown | | |
| 1997 | Orion Bus Industries Orion V (05.501) | 8033–8036 | Unknown | Detroit Diesel Series 50 | Allison B400R5 | | Previously operated by New Orleans Regional Transit Authority (NORTA), Valley Coach, and Fairfax Connector |
| 1999 | Thomas Built Buses TL960 30' | 62992–62994 | Unknown | Unknown | | | |
| 2000–01 | Thomas Dennis SLF230 | 63004–63008, 63017–63031, 63076–63078 | Unknown | Unknown | | | |
| 2000–01 | Goshen Presidential | 63009–63016, 63039–63056, 63100 | Unknown | Unknown | | | 63100 is a 2004 model. |
| 2001–02 | Thomas Dennis SLF230 | 53012, 53015–53016, ? | Unknown | Unknown | | | Ex-MTA Maryland buses |
| 2005–06 | Thomas Saf-T-Liner HDX | 63086–63099, 63101–63108 | 2015–16 | Unknown | | | |
| 2006 | Gillig Phantom 35' | 63139–63151 | 2020 | Cummins ISL EPA 2007 | Voith DIWA D864.5 | | Replaced by ElDorado buses and Gillig BRTs |
| 2008 | Gillig Low Floor | 63159–63170 (12 buses) | 2021 | Cummins ISL EPA 2007 | Voith DIWA D864.5 | | |
| 2009 | Gillig Low Floor | 62616 | 2023 | Cummins ISL EPA 2007 | Unknown | | |
