= Southern Avenue station =

Washington Metro station

Coordinates: 38°50′27.6″N 76°58′30.3″W

Southern Avenue
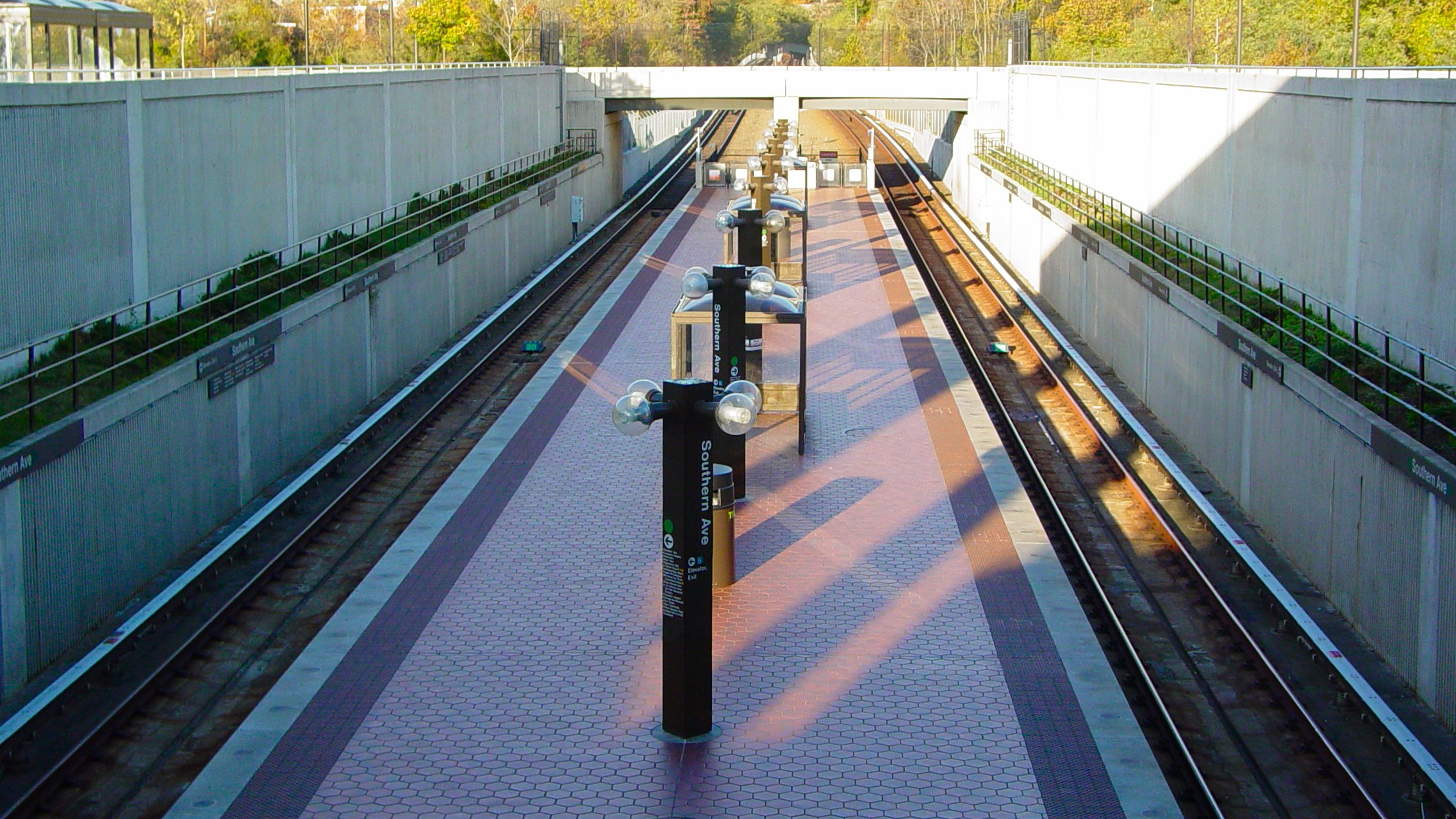
- Station platform facing south in October 2006

General information
- Location: 1141 Southern Avenue; Temple Hills, Maryland
- Owner: Washington Metropolitan Area Transit Authority
- Platforms: 1 island platform
- Tracks: 2
- Connections: Metrobus: C15, C29, D10, P93, P94, P97; GoPGC: P88, P95

Construction
- Structure type: At-grade
- Parking: 1,980 spaces
- Cycle facilities: Capital Bikeshare, 14 racks and 40 lockers
- Accessible: Yes

Other information
- Station code: F08

History
- Opened: January 13, 2001; 25 years ago

Passengers
- 2025: 3,490 (average weekday)
- Rank: 52 of 98

Services
Preceding station	Washington Metro	Following station
Naylor Road toward Branch Avenue	Green Line	Congress Heights toward Greenbelt
Route map
Location

Southern Avenue station is an island platformed Washington Metro station in Prince George's County, Maryland, United States. The station was opened on January 13, 2001, and is operated by the Washington Metropolitan Area Transit Authority (WMATA). Providing service for only the Green Line, the station is located on the southern side of Southern Avenue, putting it just outside the District of Columbia, opposite Valley Terrace straddling the D.C/Maryland border. Southern Avenue is the first station in Maryland going southeast on the Green Line.

Groundbreaking for the final segment of the Green Line occurred on September 23, 1995, and the station opened on January 13, 2001. Its opening coincided with the completion of approximately 6.5 miles (10.5 km) of rail southeast of the Anacostia station and the opening of the Congress Heights, Naylor Road, Suitland, and Branch Avenue stations.

This station provides service to National Harbor via Metrobus route P94 and GoPGC route P95.

== Station layout ==
The Southern Avenue station consists of a single island platform in an open cut, located below and in the middle of its associated parking and bus transfer complex. Although this station is open-cut, and the next station east (railroad south) (Naylor Road) is elevated, there is an underground section of the Green Line's tracks between these two stations; additionally, the Southern Avenue station descends into a tunnel at its western (railroad northern) end. The construction and overall design of the station is similar to that of Greensboro on the Silver Line because of its depressed but open-air layout. This is also the last above ground station for northbound train towards Greenbelt until Fort Totten.
