= MGM National Harbor =

Casino in National Harbor, Maryland

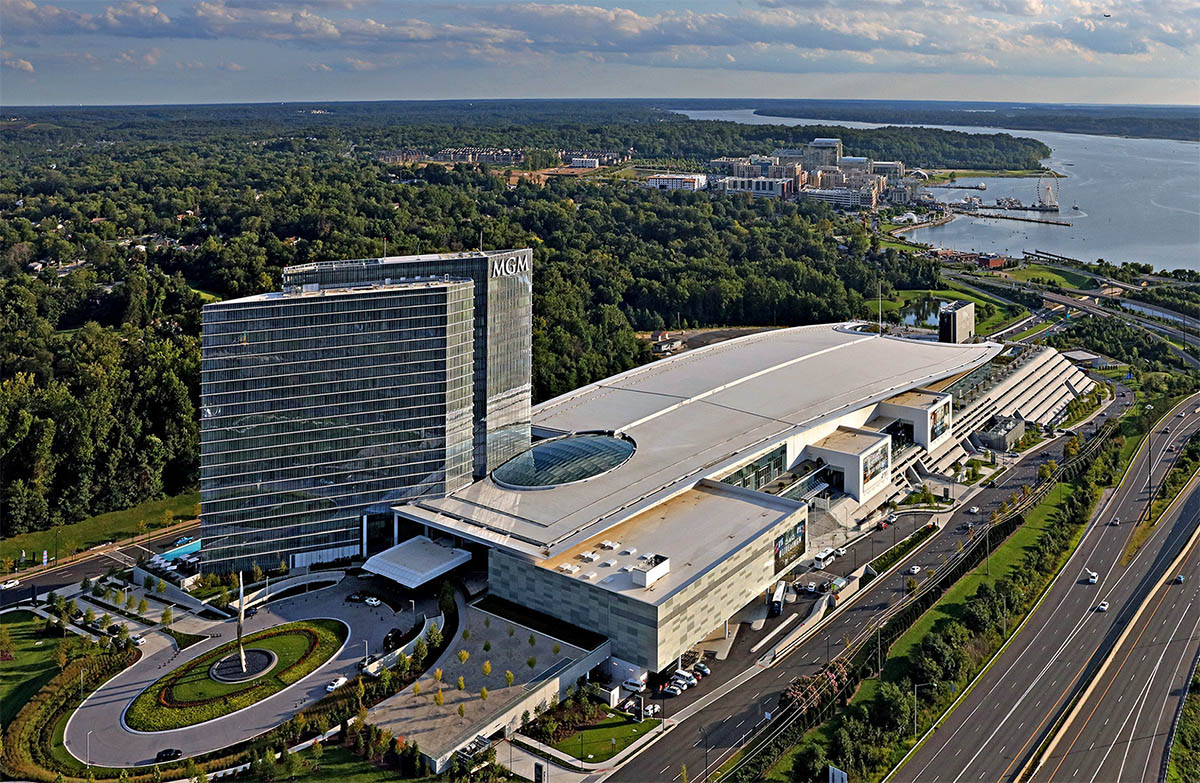
- Aerial view of hotel and casino
- Interactive map of MGM National Harbor
- Location: National Harbor; 101 MGM National Ave; 38°47′41.4″N 77°00′34.5″W
- Opened: December 8, 2016
- No. of rooms: 308
- Gaming space: 135,000 sq ft (12,500 m^{2})
- Signature attractions: The Theater at MGM National Harbor
- Casino type: Land-based
- Owner: Vici Properties
- Operating license holder: MGM Resorts International
- Website: mgmnationalharbor.com

MGM National Harbor is a casino hotel in National Harbor, Maryland, just outside of Washington, D.C. It opened on December 8, 2016, and cost $1.4 billion. It is owned by Vici Properties and operated by MGM Resorts International.

== History ==
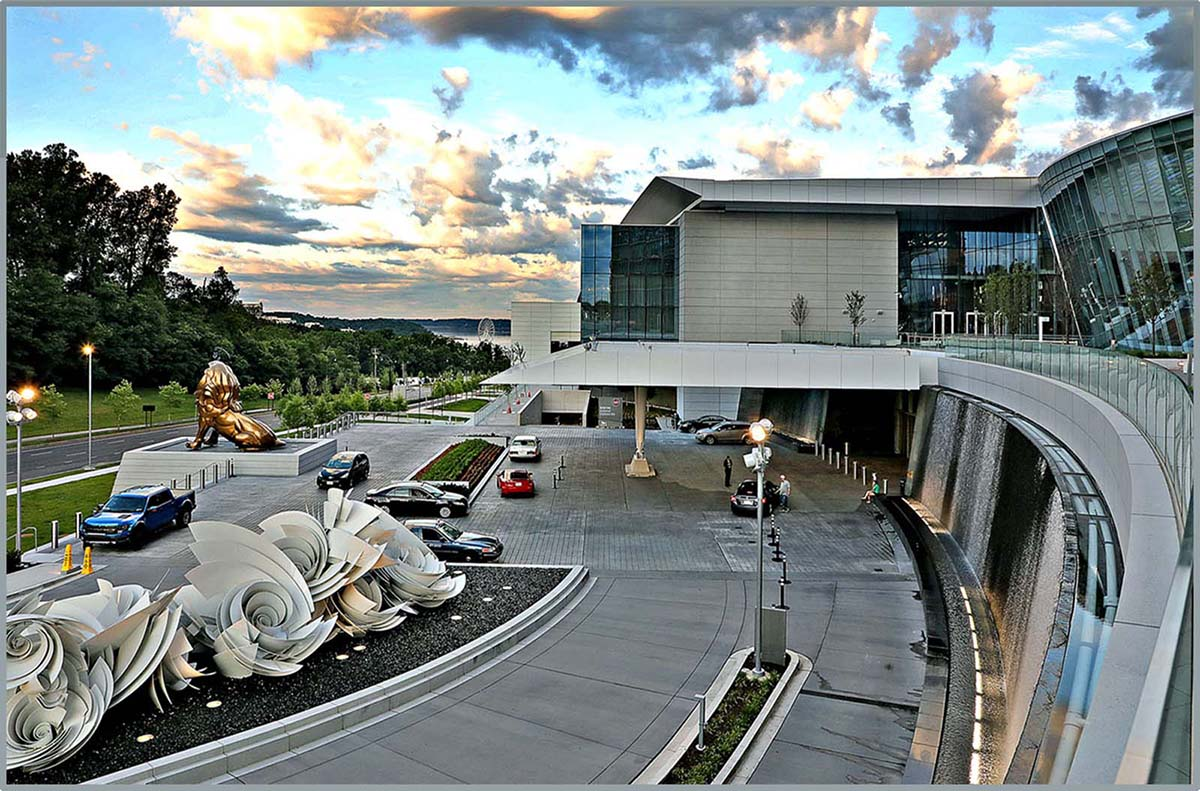
South entrance

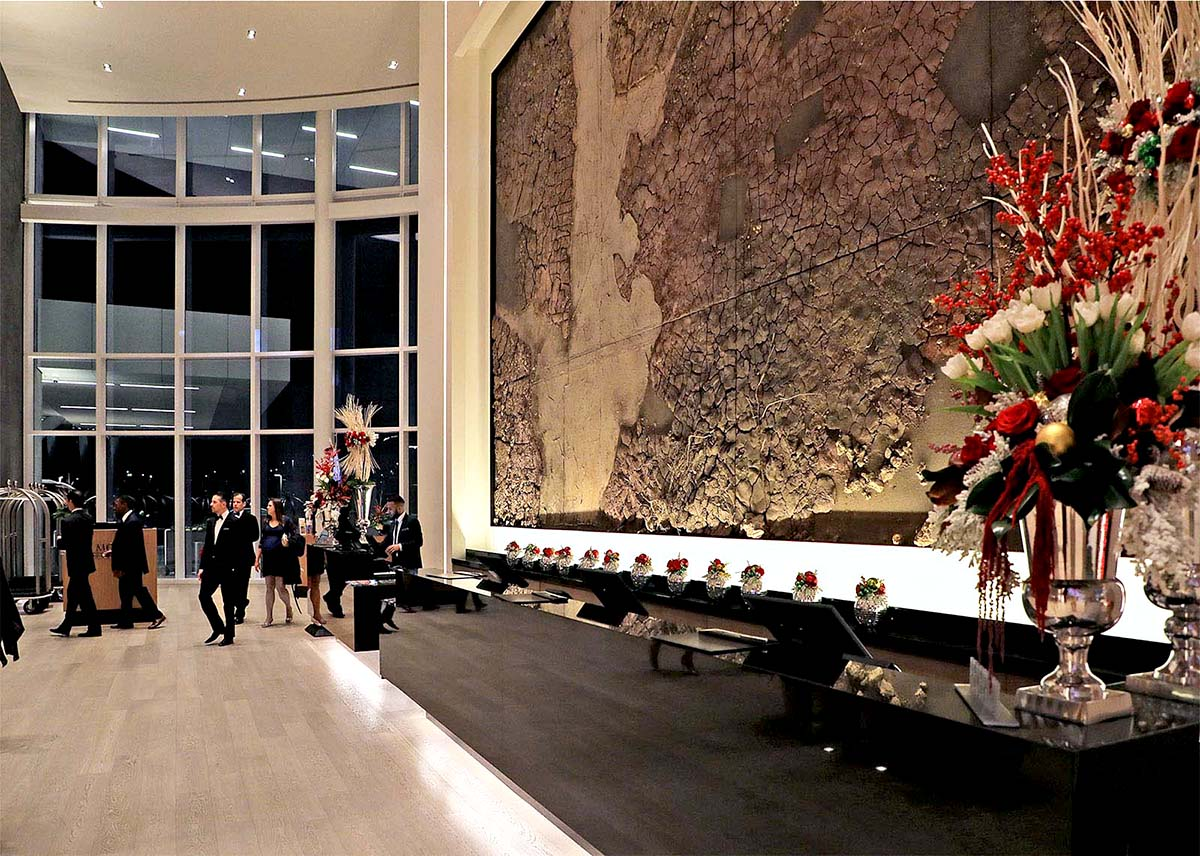
Hotel entrance and lobby

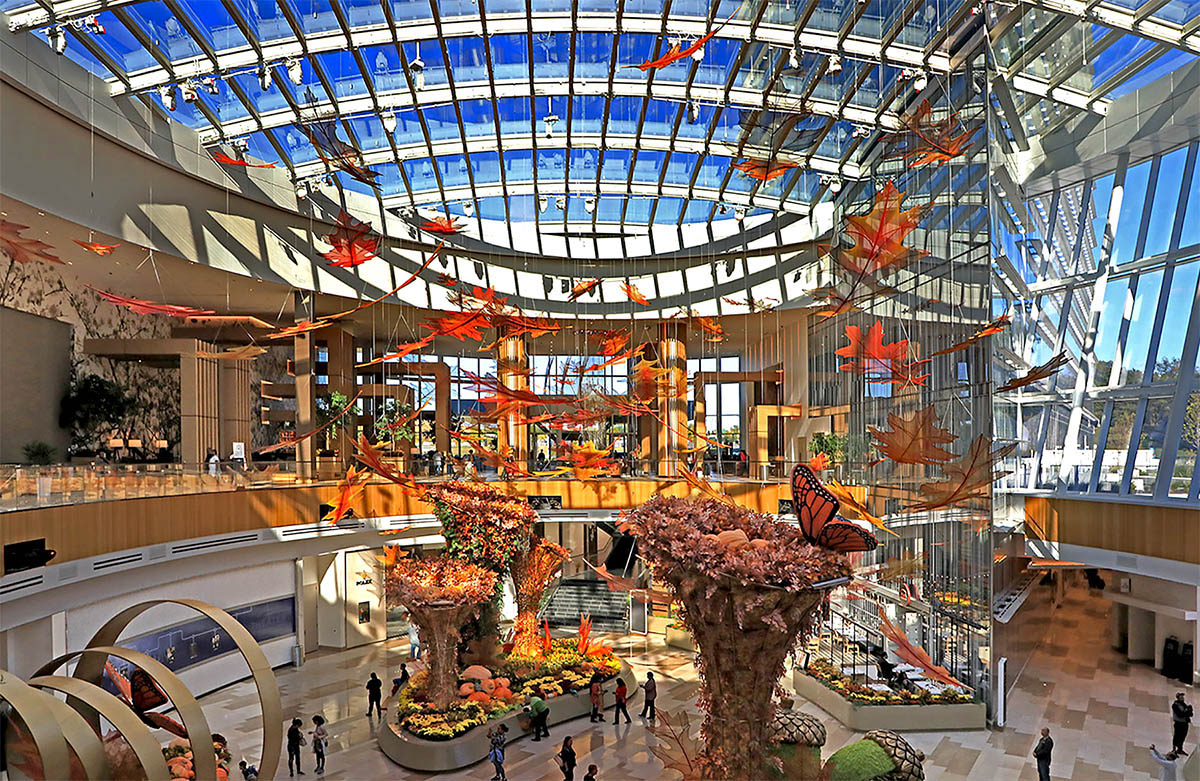
Conservatory, decorated in autumn decor

MGM Resorts International received a license in December 2013 to develop a $925-million resort (later increased to $1.2 billion) in National Harbor. The company received the license after competing with bids from Penn National Gaming to develop a $700-million facility at its Rosecroft Raceway and Greenwood Racing to develop a $761-million facility near Maryland Route 210.

Construction on MGM National Harbor began in April 2014. It opened on December 8, 2016.

In September 2017, MGM Growth Properties purchased the land and buildings of MGM National Harbor from MGM Resorts International for $1.2 billion in a leaseback transaction. Vici Properties acquired MGM Growth, including MGM National Harbor, in 2022.

== Design and features ==
The white exterior of the building is in keeping with the marble used in many of the buildings in Washington DC. The organization of the casino is along a central axis, similar to the arrangement for the National Mall. The design was provided by HKS, Inc. while the architect of record for the project is SmithGroupJJR.

MGM National Harbor includes a 23-story hotel with 308 rooms, 135,000 square feet (12,500 m^{2}) in gaming space, retail space, a spa, seven restaurants, a 3,000-seat theater with seven VIP suites, 27,000 square feet (2,500 m^{2}) of meeting and event space, and a parking garage for 4,800 cars.

The resort's public spaces feature a permanent collection of art inspired by the Washington metropolitan area and developed in collaboration with Prince George's County Arts and Humanities Council, Atlantic Arts, and RareCulture. Artists, sculptors, and photographers featured in the collection include Alice Aycock, Charles Hinman, Chul Hyun Ahn, John Safer, Liao Yibai, Margaret Boozer, Martha Jackson Jarvis, Sam Gilliam, and Terry O'Neill. The west entrance to the facility features a 25-by-15-foot (7.6 m × 4.6 m) iron archway composed of "found objects" such as farming tools, children's toys, wheels and axes designed by Bob Dylan.

== Incidents ==
=== MBE participation ===
In April 2015, the MGM casino was sued by a group of Prince George's County businesses who claimed the casino didn't comply with minority business enterprise (MBE) contracting standards.

=== Child electric shock ===
On June 26, 2018, a seven-year-old girl suffered traumatic brain injury while visiting the casino. Due to a faulty installation of a device meant to control the electrical flow to the rail lighting, Zynae Green suffered an electric shock and was left requiring the use of a wheelchair. Despite the family's pleas for help, MGM security did not initiate resuscitation, MGM stating "the guards followed protocol responding to the incident and determined that Zynae was breathing and did not need CPR". Prince George's County Police Officers started resuscitation upon arrival. The incident prompted an FBI investigation and the family had not been compensated more than a year after the incident.

=== Cheating ===
In 2019, a baccarat dealer who worked at the casino was sentenced to 18 months in prison for a cheating scheme. Ming Zhang showed his co-conspirators cards before they were dealt, and they split the winnings with him.

=== Boxing death ===
Russian boxer Maxim Dadashev died on July 23, 2019, from injuries suffered during a July 19 boxing match at the Theater at MGM National Harbor.

=== Brawls ===
Multiple brawls have been reported at the facility, including on the casino floor. During the casino's first night of operations, video emerged of an attendee who was beaten while on the floor, while another person grabbed a stool. In 2022, brawls were reported in the dining area between multiple patrons, with no security visible. The casino canceled the Thursday event where the incident occurred.

=== Robbery of winners ===
In 2020, two winners were robbed of more than $40,000 in winnings after leaving the casino and shot during the crime. The victims were followed by the assailants from the casino and robbed in Woodbridge, Virginia, where one of them lived and the other was shot.

In another 2020 incident, a casino patron and hotel guest was shot and robbed of his casino winnings. After returning to his room in the hotel portion of the facility, Nathaniel Nagbe opened the door to find two armed men accompanied by a woman he knew. After he refused to open the hotel safe that contained more than $60,000 in winnings, Nagbe was shot in his stomach and fled down 17 flights of stairs before a valet called 911.

=== 2025 shooting ===
On December 3, 2025, one man was shot and killed in the food court on the premises, while another was grazed by a bullet. Prince George's County Police are investigating the matter.

== See also ==
- List of casinos in Maryland
- List of integrated resorts

| Preceded by Crown of Beauty Theatre (China) Sanya (2015) | Miss World venue 2016 | Succeeded by Sanya City Arena (China) Sanya (2017, 2018) |
