= Southern Avenue (Washington, D.C.) =

Boundary street in Washington DC, USA

- Southern Avenue SE
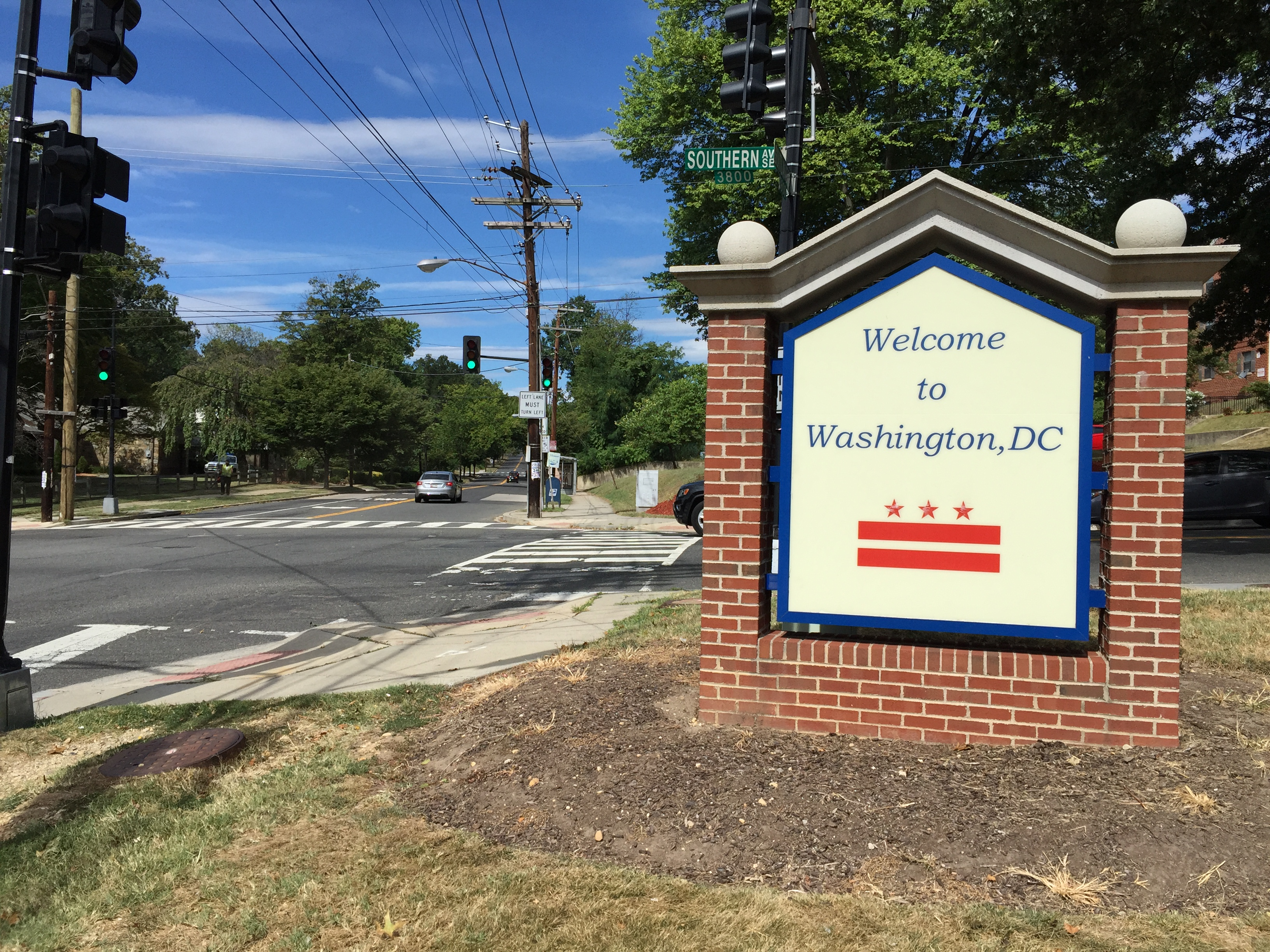
- Interactive map of Southern Avenue
- Owner: District of Columbia and Prince George's County
- Maintained by: DDOT and PGC DPW&T
- Location: Southeast, Washington, DC and Prince George's County
- Nearest metro station: Capitol Heights and Southern Avenue
- Coordinates: 38°51′24.79″N 76°57′19.47″W
- West end: MD 210 / South Capitol Street
- Major junctions: MD 5 (Branch Avenue); MD 218 (Suitland Road); MD 4 (Pennsylvania Avenue); MD 214 / East Capitol Street
- East end: Eastern Avenue SE

Construction
- Construction start: Before 1928

Southern Avenue is one of three boundary streets between Washington, D.C., and the state of Maryland. Following a southwest-to-northeast line, Southern Avenue begins at the intersection of South Capitol Street in Southeast, Washington, D.C., and Indian Head Highway on the Maryland side. It runs for approximately 7 miles (11 km) to its other end at Eastern Avenue in Northeast, Washington, D.C., with an uncompleted gap between Naylor Road SE and Branch Avenue SE.

Southern Avenue was built in pieces. For example, the portion between Benning Road SE and 46th Street SE was not started until 1928. One of the first residential developments on Southern Avenue was Fairfield, a cluster of luxury homes at the intersection of Highview Terrace SE and 34th Street SE in the Summit Park neighborhood.

The Southern Avenue bridge over Suitland Parkway was the first orthotropic deck girder bridge built in Washington, D.C.

== Bibliography ==
- Modern Welded Structures. Volume 4. Cleveland, Ohio: James F. Lincoln Arc Welding Foundation. 1980.
