= Sheriff Road–Capitol Heights Line =

F14
- Sheriff Road–Capitol Heights Line

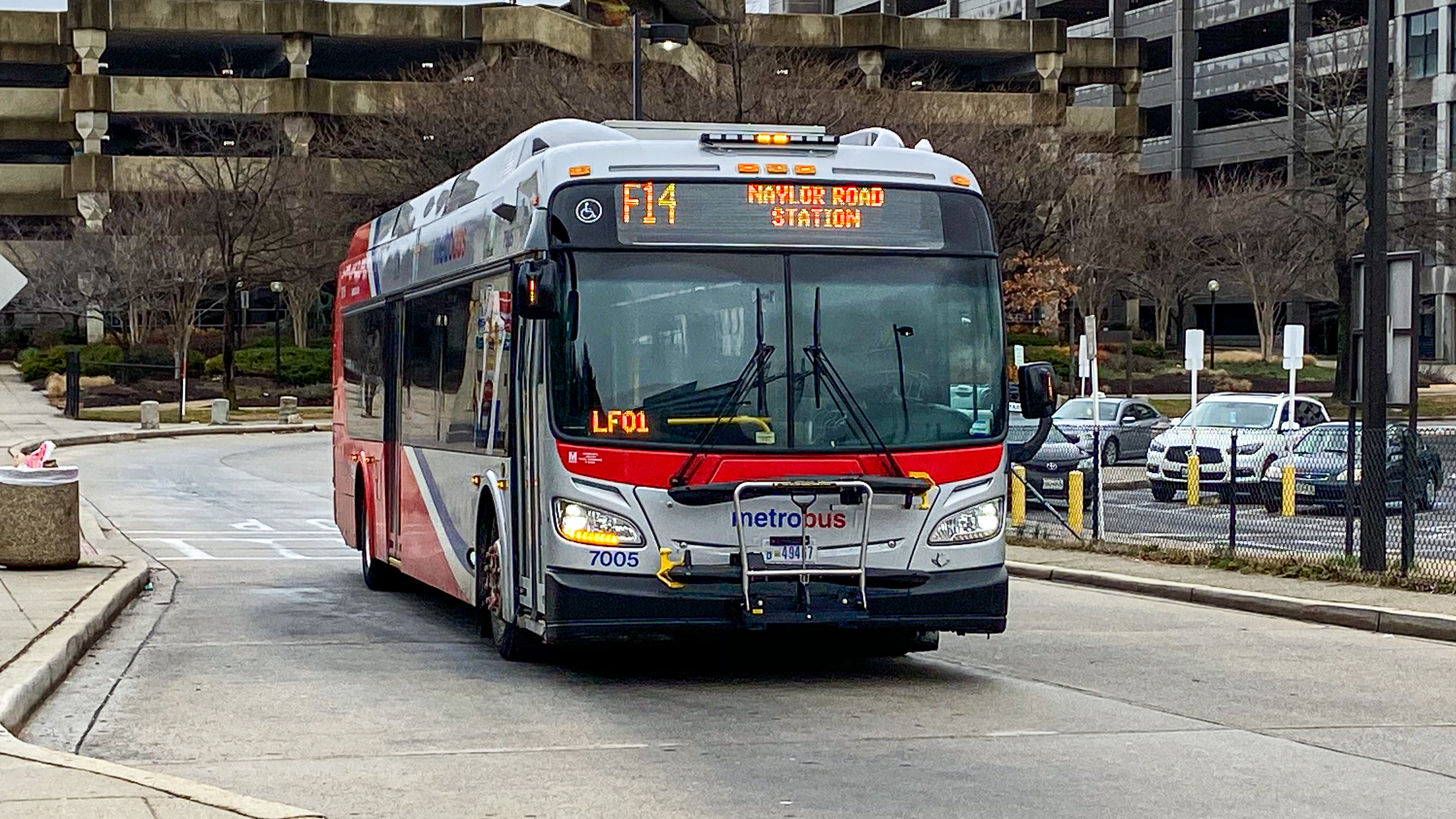
- Route F14 at New Carrollton station

Overview
- System: Metrobus
- Operator: Washington Metropolitan Area Transit Authority
- Garage: Landover
- Livery: Local
- Status: Discontinued
- Began service: 1951
- Ended service: June 29, 2025

Route
- Locale: Prince George's County, Northeast, Southeast
- Communities served: New Carrollton, Glenarden, Landover, Hyattsville, Village Green, Chapel Oaks, Cedar Heights, Palmer Park, Fairmount Heights, Seat Pleasant, Capitol Heights, Coral Hills, Suitland, Hillcrest Heights, Fort Davis Park, Fairfax Village, Temple Hills
- Landmarks served: Washington Heights, Capitol Heights station, Addison Road station, Bradbury Heights
- Start: New Carrollton station
- Via: Sheriff Road, Martin Luther King Highway, Larchmont Avenue, Southern Avenue
- End: Naylor Road station
- Length: 60 minutes

Service
- Level: Monday-Saturday
- Frequency: 30-35 minutes (Peak Hours); 50 Minutes (Midday and Saturday Service)
- Operates: 4:39 AM – 8:52 PM (Weekdays); 5:02 AM – 8:52 PM (Saturdays)
- Ridership: 401,303 (FY 2024)
- Transfers: SmarTrip only
- Timetable: Sheriff Road-Capitol Heights Line

The Sheriff Road–Capitol Heights Line, designated Route F14, was a bus route that operated Monday to Saturday that was operated by the Washington Metropolitan Area Transit Authority between New Carrollton station of the Orange and Silver Lines of the Washington Metro and Naylor Road station of the Green Line of the Washington Metro. The line operated every 30–35 minutes during rush hours and 50 minutes at all other times. Trips roughly took 60 minutes to complete. The route was combined with the V12 and renamed to Route P61 during WMATA's Better Bus Redesign.

== Background ==
Route F14 operated Monday through Saturday between 4:39 AM to 8:52 PM on weekdays and 5:02 AM to 8:52 PM on Saturdays. The line connects New Carrollton to Temple Hills without having to take Metrorail or enter Washington DC. It connected multiple neighborhoods to various Metrorail stations. A portion of the F14 routing between Capitol Heights station and Addison Road station along East Capitol Street was replaced by the A12 on Sundays.

Route F14 operated out of Landover Division.

=== F14 stops ===
Bus stop	Direction	Connections
Prince George's County, Maryland
New Carrollton Bus Bay A	Southbound station, Northbound terminal	Metrobus: A12, B21, B22, B24, B27, F4, F6, F12, F13, G12, G14, T14, T18; MTA Maryland Commuter Bus; TheBus: 15X, 16, 21, 21X; Greyhound; Peter Pan Bus Lines; Washington Metro: MARC: Penn Line; Amtrak: Northeast Regional, Palmetto, Vermonter; MTA: Purple Line (Planned)
Corporate Drive / Garden City Drive	Northbound	Metrobus: A12, F12
Ardwick Ardmore Road / Pennsy Drive	Southbound	Metrobus: A12, F12; TheBus: 21
Ardwick Ardmore Road / Ardwick Place	Bidirectional	Metrobus: A12, F12; TheBus: 21
Ardwick Ardmore Road / Whitetire Road	Southbound	Metrobus: A12; TheBus: 21
Ardwick Ardmore Road / #8335-8361	Southbound	Metrobus: A12; TheBus: 21
Ardwick Ardmore Road / #8440	Northbound	Metrobus: A12; TheBus: 21
Ardwick Ardmore Road / Preston Drive	Southbound	Metrobus: A12; TheBus: 21
Ardwick Ardmore Road / West Street	Northbound	Metrobus: A12; TheBus: 21
Martin Luther King Highway / Dellwood Court	Southbound	Metrobus: A12
Martin Luther King Highway / Reed Street	Northbound	Metrobus: A12
Johnson Avenue / Martin Luther King Highway	Southbound	Metrobus: A12
Johnson Avenue / Hayes Street	Northbound	Metrobus: A12
Hayes Street / Johnson Avenue	Bidirectional	Metrobus: A12
Hayes Street / Glenarden Parkway	Southbound	Metrobus: A12
Glenarden Parkway / Hayes Street	Northbound	Metrobus: A12
Glenarden Parkway / Martin Luther King Highway	Southbound	Metrobus: A12
Glenarden Parkway / Municipal Center	Northbound	Metrobus: A12
Glenarden Parkway / McLain Avenue	Southbound	Metrobus: A12
Glenarden Parkway / Reed Street	Bidirectional	Metrobus: A12
Glenarden Parkway / Wesley Street	Bidirectional	Metrobus: A12
Glenarden Parkway / Brightseat Road	Southbound	Metrobus: A12; TheBus: 21
Brightseat Road / McLain Avenue	Northbound	Metrobus: A12; TheBus: 21
Brightseat Road / Reicher Street	Bidirectional	Metrobus: A12; TheBus: 21
Brightseat Road / Hamlin Street	Bidirectional	Metrobus: A12; TheBus: 21
Brightseat Road / Girard Street	Northbound	Metrobus: A12; TheBus: 21, 21X
Brightseat Road / Evarts Street	Bidirectional	Metrobus: A12; TheBus: 21, 22
Brightseat Road / Maple Ridge Apartments	Southbound	Metrobus: A12; TheBus: 21, 22
Brightseat Road / Maple Ridge Apartments	Bidirectional	Metrobus: A12; TheBus: 21, 21X, 22
Brightseat Road / Landover Road	Bidirectional	TheBus: 22
Hill Oaks Road / Michele Drive	Bidirectional	
Hill Oaks Road / Nalley Road	Bidirectional	TheBus: 23
Nalley Road / Capital View Drive	Bidirectional	TheBus: 23
Nalley Road / Nalley Terrace	Bidirectional	TheBus: 23
Belle Haven Drive / Nalley Road	Bidirectional	TheBus: 23
Belle Haven Drive / Belle Haven Court	Bidirectional	TheBus: 23
Village Green Drive / Belle Haven Drive	Northbound	TheBus: 23
Village Green Drive / Sheriff Road	Bidirectional	TheBus: 23
Sheriff Road / Village Green Drive	Northbound	TheBus: 23
Belle Haven Drive / Sheriff Road	Bidirectional	TheBus: 23
Belle Haven Drive / #1825-#1827	Bidirectional	
Belle Haven Drive / Martin Luther King Highway	Northbound	Metrobus: A12, F12; TheBus: 18
Martin Luther King Highway / King Shopping Center	Bidirectional	Metrobus: A12; TheBus: 18
Martin Luther King Highway / Ryderwood Court	Bidirectional	Metrobus: A12; TheBus: 18
Martin Luther King Highway / Roosevelt Avenue	Bidirectional	Metrobus: A12; TheBus: 18
Sheriff Road / Martin Luther King Highway	Southbound	Metrobus: A12; TheBus: 18, 23
Sheriff Road / Giant Gate #2	Northbound	Metrobus: A12; TheBus: 18, 23
Sheriff Road / Giant Main Entrance	Bidirectional	TheBus: 23
Sheriff Road / Cabin Branch Drive	Bidirectional	TheBus: 23
Sheriff Road / Glen Willow Drive	Bidirectional	TheBus: 23
Sheriff Road / Cypresstree Drive	Bidirectional	TheBus: 23
Sheriff Road / Cedar Heights Drive	Bidirectional	TheBus: 23
Sheriff Road / Marblewood Avenue	Bidirectional	
Sheriff Road / Fairmount Heights Drive	Southbound	
Sheriff Road / 60th Avenue	Northbound	
Addison Road / Sheriff Road	Bidirectional	Metrobus: V14
Addison Road / L Street	Bidirectional	Metrobus: V14
Addison Road / 60th Avenue	Bidirectional	Metrobus: V14
Addison Road / 61st Avenue	Bidirectional	Metrobus: V14
Addison Road / Greig Street	Northbound	Metrobus: V14
Addison Road / Field Street	Southbound	Metrobus: V14
Addison Road / G Street	Northbound	Metrobus: V14
Martin Luther King Highway / 68th Street	Southbound	
Northeast Washington, D.C.
63rd Street NE / Eastern Avenue	Northbound	Metrobus: V2, V4, X9
63rd Street NE / Clay Street NE	Southbound	Metrobus: V2, V4
Prince George's County, Maryland
East Capitol Street / Southern Avenue Capitol Heights	Southbound	Metrobus: 96, A12, V2, V4, X9; TheBus: 24, 25; Washington Metro:
Capitol Heights Bus Bay A	Northbound	Metrobus: 96, A12, V2, V4, X9; TheBus: 24, 25; Washington Metro:
East Capitol Street / Maryland Park Drive	Bidirectional	Metrobus: A12; TheBus: 24, 25
East Capitol Street / Yost Place	Bidirectional	Metrobus: A12; TheBus: 24, 25
Addison Road-Seat Pleasant Bus Bay A	Bidirectional	Metrobus: A12, C21, C22, C27, C29, J12, P12, V12, V14; TheBus: 18, 20, 23; Washington Metro:
Central Avenue / Yolanda Avenue	Northbound	Metrobus: J12, V14; TheBus: 24, 25
Central Avenue / Yeoman Place	Southbound	Metrobus: J12, V14; TheBus: 24, 25
Central Avenue / Rollins Avenue	Northbound	Metrobus: J12, V14; TheBus: 24, 25
Central Avenue / Maryland Park Drive	Southbound	Metrobus: J12, V14; TheBus: 25
Central Avenue / Xenia Avenue	Northbound	Metrobus: J12, V14; TheBus: 25
Central Avenue / Ventura Avenue	Bidirectional	Metrobus: J12, V14; TheBus: 25
Central Avenue / Tunic Avenue	Southbound	Metrobus: J12, V14; TheBus: 25
Central Avenue / United States Post Office	Bidirectional	Metrobus: J12; TheBus: 25
Central Avenue / Quire Avenue	Southbound	Metrobus: J12; TheBus: 25
Central Avenue / Capitol Heights Boulevard	Bidirectional	Metrobus: J12; TheBus: 25
Central Avenue / Clovis Avenue	Northbound	Metrobus: J12
Larchmont Avenue / Clovis Avenue	Southbound	Metrobus: J12
Larchmont Avenue / Cumberland Street	Bidirectional	Metrobus: J12
Larchmont Avenue / Doppler Street	Bidirectional	Metrobus: J12
Larchmont Avenue / #717	Bidirectional	Metrobus: J12
Larchmont Avenue / Emo Street	Bidirectional	Metrobus: J12
Larchmont Avenue / Fable Street	Bidirectional	Metrobus: J12
Larchmont Avenue / #1221	Southbound	Metrobus: J12
Larchmont Avenue / #1218	Northbound	Metrobus: J12
Larchmont Avenue / Marlboro Pike	Southbound	Metrobus: J12; TheBus: 25
Marlboro Pike / Jansen Avenue	Bidirectional	Metrobus: J12; TheBus: 25
Marlboro Pike / Glacier Avenue	Bidirectional	TheBus: 25
Marlboro Pike / Edgewick Avenue	Bidirectional	TheBus: 25
Marlboro Pike / Boones Hill Road	Bidirectional	
Southern Avenue / Bowen Road SE	Southbound	Metrobus: V7, W4
Southern Avenue / Pear Street	Northbound	Metrobus: V7, W4
Southern Avenue / Ridge Road SE	Southbound	Metrobus: S35, V7, W4
Southern Avenue / Rail Street	Northbound	Metrobus: S35, V7, W4
Southern Avenue / Torque Street	Bidirectional	Metrobus: S35, V7, W4
Southern Avenue / Barker Street SE	Southbound	Metrobus: S35, V7, W4
Southern Avenue / Vine Street	Northbound	Metrobus: S35, V7, W4
Southern Avenue / Massachusetts Avenue	Southbound	Metrobus: M6, S35, V7, W4
Southern Avenue / Byers Street	Northbound	Metrobus: M6, S35, V7, W4
Southern Avenue / 42nd Street SE	Bidirectional	Metrobus: M6, S35, V7, W4
Southern Avenue / Ellis Street	Northbound	Metrobus: M6, S35, V7, W4
Southern Avenue / 41st Street SE	Southbound	Metrobus: M6, S35, V7, W4
Southern Avenue / 41st Place SE	Bidirectional	Metrobus: M6, S35, V7, W4
Southern Avenue / Fort Dupont Street SE	Southbound	Metrobus: M6, S35, V7, W4
Southern Avenue / Belt Road	Northbound	Metrobus: M6, S35, V7, W4
Southern Avenue / Suitland Terrace	Bidirectional	Metrobus: M6
Southern Avenue / Suitland Road	Bidirectional	Metrobus: M6
Southern Avenue / Forest Glade Lane	Bidirectional	
Southern Avenue / 36th Place SE	Southbound	
Southern Avenue / Oxon Run Place	Northbound	
Southern Avenue / 34th Street SE	Bidirectional	
Southern Avenue / Fairhill Drive	Bidirectional	
Branch Avenue / Southern Avenue	Bidirectional	
Naylor Road Bus Bay B	Northbound stop, Southbound terminal	Metrobus: 36, C12, C14, H12; TheBus: 32; Washington Metro:

== History ==
The F14 began operation as the Sheriff Road Line under the Washington Marlboro & Annapolis Motor Lines Inc. (WM&A) in 1951, to operate between the Mayfair neighborhood in Northeast Washington D.C. and Glenn Dale Hospital in Glenn Dale, Maryland, mostly operating along Kenilworth Terrace, Sheriff Road, and Palmer Highway. F14 was eventually acquired by WMATA on February 4, 1973.

On December 3, 1978 shortly after Deanwood and New Carrollton stations opened, F14 was rerouted to operate between New Carrollton and Deanwood mostly operating along Annapolis Road, Whitfield Chapel Road, Palmer Highway, Sheriff Road, Addison Road, and Minnesota Avenue. The segment of F14's routing on Sheriff Road NE & Eastern Avenue NE, was replaced by a new route U4. The F14's loop inside the Mayfair neighborhood was also replaced by route U2. The segment of F14's routing between the intersection of Palmer Highway and Whitfield Chapel Road and Glenn Dale Hospital, was replaced by route T12.

On January 4, 1981, after both Addison Road and Capitol Heights station opened, route F14 was rerouted to operate between New Carrollton station & Bradbury Heights (Ridge Road SE & Southern Avenue SE), instead of operating to Deanwood station. The F14 would keep its original route between New Carrollton and the intersection of Addison Road & Sheriff Road in Chapel Oaks, then was rerouted to operate along Addison Road, and East Capitol Street and serve Capitol Heights station when operating towards Bradbury Heights. The route would enter Capitol Heights station bus bays when operating to New Carrollton.

The F14 would then remain on East Capitol Street, which would become Central Avenue, then turn onto Addison Road, then serve Addison Road station. The line would then operate along Central Avenue, Larchmont Avenue, Marlboro Pike, and Bowen Road, to reach its Bradbury Heights terminal at the intersection of Ridge Road SE & Southern Avenue SE. The line would operate on its same routing back to New Carrollton.

The segment of F14's routing between the intersection of Addison Road & Sheriff Road and Deanwood station, was taken over by route R12.

On December 11, 1993, routes F13 and F14 swapped their routing. The F14's terminal at New Carrollton station, was relocated from the western side of the station to the eastern side of New Carrollton. The F14 was also rerouted to operate between New Carrollton and the intersection of Martin Luther King Jr. Highway & Belle Haven Drive, via the Glenarden neighborhood and Landover Mall. Route F13 operated along Ellin Road, Harkins Road, Annapolis Road, and Whitfield Chapel Road.

On January 13, 2001, when Naylor Road station opened, route F14 was extended from Bradbury Heights to Naylor Road station via Southern Avenue and Branch Avenue. The line was also renamed to the Sheriff Road–Capitol Heights Line.

In 2014, WMATA proposed to reroute the F14 by turning left on Landover Road from Brightseat Road to serve a portion of the A12 route before turning back onto MLK highway where the A12 was proposed to be extended to New Carrollton station via Brightseat Road. Service between Brightseat and Landover Road and Brightseat and Martin Luther King Jr. Highway will be discontinued and replaced by extended route A12.

During the COVID-19 pandemic, the route was reduced to operate on its Saturday supplemental schedule beginning on March 16, 2020. Saturday service was also suspended beginning on March 21, 2020. Full service resumed on August 23, 2020.

On May 29, 2022, Saturday service was increased.

In 2024 during WMATA's FY2024 Budget crisis, WMATA proposed to eliminate all F14 service. However on April 25, 2024, Metro’s Board of Directors approved a $4.8 billion capital and operating budget which avoided service cuts.

=== Better Bus Redesign ===
In 2022, WMATA launched its Better Bus Redesign project, which aimed to redesign the entire Metrobus Network and is the first full redesign of the agency's bus network in its history.

In April 2023, WMATA launched its Draft Visionary Network. As part of the drafts, WMATA proposed to split the F14 into two routes.

The first route was named Route MD363 and would operate closely to the current F14 between New Carrollton station and Suitland station, however, the routing between the intersection of Sheriff Road & Martin Luther King Jr. Highway and the intersection of Brightseat Road & Landover Road would see significant changes. The route would operate along Sheriff Road, Belle Haven Drive, Martin Luther King Jr. Highway, Greenleaf Drive, Barlowe Road, and Landover Road, serving the Palmer Park neighborhood.

The second route was named Route MD257 and would closely operate along the current F14 routing between New Carrollton station and FedEx Field, but would not serve Johnson Street or Hayes Street in Glenarden. Following FedEx Field, the route would be extended to Branch Avenue station via Garrett A Morgan Boulevard, Morgan Boulevard station, Central Avenue, Shady Glenn Drive, Walker Mill Drive, Marlboro Pike, Forrestville Road, Allentown Road, and Auth Road, partially combining the route with the current Route K12.

During WMATA's Revised Draft Visionary Network, WMATA changed Routes MD257 and MD363 heavily.

Route MD257 would be renamed to Route P61 and would be modified to serve Suitland station. The route would follow the current F14 routing between New Carrollton station and FedEx Field, with service along Johnson Street and Hayes Street being restored, then would operate on the proposed route MD257 routing to the intersection of Central Avenue & Shady Glenn Drive via Garrett A Morgan Boulevard and Morgan Boulevard station. There, the route would be combined with the current Route V12 and would operate to Suitland station via Shady Glenn Drive, Walker Mill Drive, Rochell Avenue, Council Drive, Gateway Boulevard, Marlboro Pike, Brooks Drive, Pennsylvania Avenue, Shadyside Avenue, Suitland Road, and Silver Hill Road.

Route MD363 would be renamed to Route P63 and would only operate between Naylor Road station and Addison Road station via the current F14 routing along Branch Avenue SE, Southern Avenue SE, Marlboro Pike, Larchmont Avenue, Central Avenue, Old Central Avenue, and Addison Road. Service between Capitol Heights station and FedEx Field was taken over by various Metrobus and TheBus routes.

All changes were then proposed during WMATA's 2025 Proposed Network.

During the proposal, Route P63 was changed to be combined with the proposed Route P51 and operate between Downtown Largo station and Naylor Road station via Central Avenue, Garrett A Morgan Boulevard, Morgan Boulevard station, Addison Road station, Old Central Avenue, Larchmont Avenue, Marlboro Pike, Southern Avenue SE, and Branch Avenue SE. Route P61 kept its proposed routing.

On November 21, 2024, WMATA approved its Better Bus Redesign Network.

Beginning on June 29, 2025, Route F14 was combined with the V12 and was renamed the P61. The F14 portion between New Carrollton and Northwest Stadium remained the same, but the route followed Garrett A. Morgan Boulevard before serving Morgan Boulevard station, before turning onto Central Avenue and then onto Shady Glen Drive, following the V12 routing to Suitland station. F14 service between Naylor Road station and Addison Road station was replaced by Route P63 (former Routes C21, C22, C26, C27, and C29) and service between Capitol Heights station and Northwest stadium was discontinued or covered by other routes.
