= Marlboro Pike Line =

Bus route in Washington, D.C.

J12
- Marlboro Pike Line

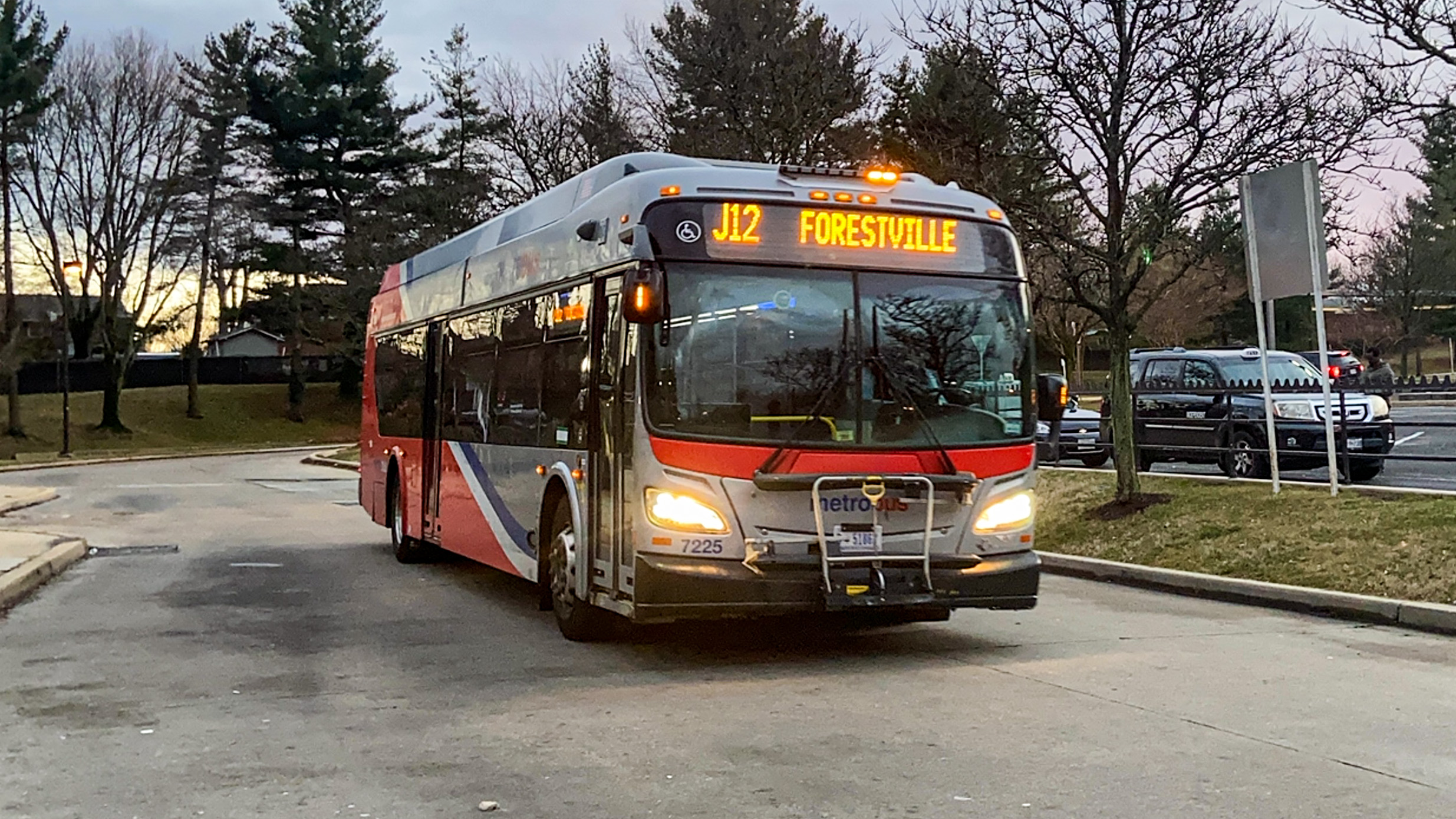
- Route J12 at Addison Road station

Overview
- System: Metrobus
- Operator: Washington Metropolitan Area Transit Authority
- Garage: Andrews Federal Center
- Livery: Local
- Status: Discontinued
- Began service: 1925
- Ended service: J11, J13: June 26, 2016; J14, J15: December 18, 2004; J12: June 29, 2025

Route
- Locale: Prince George's County, MD
- Communities served: Walker Mill, Capitol Heights, Coral Hills, District Heights, Forestville
- Landmarks served: Forestville, Presidential Corporate Center, District Heights, Capitol Heights, Addison Road station
- Start: Addison Road station
- Via: Larchmont Avenue, Marlboro Pike, Pennsylvania Avenue (to Forestville), Presidential Parkway (rush hour trips only), Old Marlboro Pike (to Forestville), Forestville Road, Suitland Parkway (to Addison Road)
- End: Forestville (8411 Old Marlboro Pike)
- Length: 20-30 minutes (All times); 45 minutes (Peak Hours)

Service
- Level: Daily
- Frequency: 35 minutes (Peak Hours); 60-70 Minutes (All other times)
- Weekend frequency: 70 minutes
- Operates: 4:25 AM - 11:30 PM (Weekdays); 6:15 AM - 10:00 PM (Weekends)
- Ridership: 243,868 (FY 2024)
- Transfers: SmarTrip only
- Timetable: Marlboro Pike Line

The Marlboro Pike Line, designated Route J12, was a daily bus route operated by the Washington Metropolitan Area Transit Authority between the Addison Road station of the Blue & Silver Lines of the Washington Metro & Forestville (8411 Old Marlboro Pike). The line operated every 35 minutes during peak hours, and 70 minutes during midday and on the weekends. J12 trips were roughly 28–35 minutes long. The route was eliminated during WMATA's Better Bus Redesign with portions of the Route replaced by WMATA Route P66 and TheBus Route P76.

== Background ==
Route J12 operated between Addison Road station and Forestville (8411 Old Marlboro Pike) from 4:25 am to 11:30 pm on weekdays and 6:15 am to 10:00 pm on weekends every 35 minutes during peak hours and 70 minutes during the off-peak hours. Route J12 originally operated out of the Southern Avenue Annex division until February 1989, when the Landover division opened. The J12 was shifted to operate out of Andrews Federal Center division on June 23, 2019.

=== J12 stops ===
Bus stop	Direction	Connections
Prince George's County, Maryland
Addison Road station Bus Bay E	Eastbound stop, Westbound terminal	Metrobus: A12, C21, C22, C27, C29, F14, P12, V12, V14; TheBus: 18, 20, 23; Washington Metro:
Central Avenue / Yolanda Avenue	Westbound	Metrobus: F14, V14; TheBus: 24, 25
Central Avenue / Yeoman Place	Eastbound	Metrobus: F14, V14; TheBus: 24, 25
Central Avenue / Rollins Avenue	Westbound	Metrobus: F14, V14; TheBus: 24, 25
Central Avenue / Maryland Park Drive	Eastbound	Metrobus: F14, V14; TheBus: 25
Central Avenue / Xenia Avenue	Westbound	Metrobus: F14, V14; TheBus: 25
Central Avenue / Ventura Avenue	Bidirectional	Metrobus: F14, V14; TheBus: 25
Central Avenue / Tunic Avenue	Eastbound	Metrobus: F14, V14; TheBus: 25
Central Avenue / United States Post Office	Westbound	Metrobus: F14; TheBus: 25
Central Avenue / Quire Avenue	Eastbound	Metrobus: F14; TheBus: 25
Central Avenue / Capitol Heights Boulevard	Bidirectional	Metrobus: F14; TheBus: 25
Central Avenue / Clovis Avenue	Westbound	Metrobus: F14
Larchmont Avenue / Clovis Avenue	Eastbound	Metrobus: F14
Larchmont Avenue / Cumberland Street	Bidirectional	Metrobus: F14
Larchmont Avenue / Doppler Street	Bidirectional	Metrobus: F14
Larchmont Avenue / #717	Bidirectional	Metrobus: F14
Larchmont Avenue / Emo Street	Bidirectional	Metrobus: F14
Larchmont Avenue / Fable Street	Bidirectional	Metrobus: F14
Larchmont Avenue / #1221	Eastbound	Metrobus: F14
Larchmont Avenue / #1218	Westbound	Metrobus: F14
Larchmont Avenue / Marlboro Pike	Eastbound	Metrobus: F14; TheBus: 25
Marlboro Pike / Larchmont Avenue	Westbound	Metrobus: F14; TheBus: 25
Marlboro Pike / Nova Avenue	Eastbound	TheBus: 25
Marlboro Pike / Opus Avenue	Bidirectional	TheBus: 25
Marlboro Pike / Shamrock Avenue	Bidirectional	
Marlboro Pike / Lee Jay Drive	Bidirectional	
Marlboro Pike / Brooks Drive	Bidirectional	Metrobus: V12; TheBus: 24
Marlboro Pike / Walker Mill Road	Bidirectional	Metrobus: V12; TheBus: 24
Marlboro Pike / Tanow Place	Bidirectional	Metrobus: V12
Marlboro Pike / Oakwood Lane	Bidirectional	Metrobus: V12
Marlboro Pike / Penn Crossing Drive	Bidirectional	Metrobus: V12
Marlboro Pike / Weber Drive	Bidirectional	Metrobus: V12
Marlboro Pike / Silver Hill Road	Bidirectional	Metrobus: V12
Marlboro Pike / Delano Lane	Bidirectional	Metrobus: V12
Marlboro Pike / Old Silver Hill Road	Bidirectional	Metrobus: P12, V12; TheBus: 24
Marlboro Pike / Gateway Boulevard	Eastbound	Metrobus: P12, V12; TheBus: 20, 24
Marlboro Pike / Kipling Parkway	Bidirectional	TheBus: 20, 24
Marlboro Pike / Upland Avenue	Bidirectional	TheBus: 20
Marlboro Pike / Walters Lane	Bidirectional	TheBus: 20
Marlboro Pike / Forest Run Drive	Eastbound	TheBus: 20
Marlboro Pike / Whitney Place	Westbound	TheBus: 20
Marlboro Pike / Lorring Drive	Bidirectional	Metrobus: K12, V14
Marlboro Pike / Boones Lane	Bidirectional	Metrobus: K12, V14
Marlboro Pike / Kirtland Avenue	Westbound	Metrobus: K12
Marlboro Pike / Lakehurst Avenue	Eastbound	Metrobus: K12
Marlboro Pike / Ritchie Road	Westbound	Metrobus: K12
Marlboro Pike / Newkirk Avenue	Eastbound	Metrobus: K12
Marlboro Pike / Pumphrey Drive	Bidirectional	Metrobus: K12; TheBus: 24
Presidential Parkway / #8903 (Police Plaza)	Eastbound (Weekday Peak Hours only)	
Presidential Parkway / IAM Building	Eastbound (Weekday Peak Hours only)	
Old Marlboro Pike / #8411 Forestville	Westbound stop, Eastbound terminal	
Old Marlboro Pike / The Kelly Building	Westbound	
Forestville Road / #4211	Westbound	Metrobus: K12
Forestville Road / Suit Road	Westbound	Metrobus: K12
Forestville Road / Stewart Road	Westbound	Metrobus: K12

== History ==
J12 began operation in 1925 and initially operated as part of the Marlboro Pike streetcar line between Federal Triangle in Downtown Washington D.C. and Andrews Air Force Base in Camp Springs, Maryland. J12 was later converted into a bus route during the 1950s, before ultimately becoming a WMATA Metrobus Route on February 4, 1973, when WMATA acquired four private bus companies that operated throughout the Washington D.C. Metropolitan Area. J12 began serving Potomac Avenue and Eastern Market stations, once they opened on July 15, 1977, in the middle of its already existing route.

On September 25, 1978, J12 was shortened to only operate between Potomac Avenue station and Andrews Air Force Base during the times the Blue Line operated. J12 would continue to make one early morning and late night trip that operated between the Federal Triangle & Andrews Air Force Base during the e times the Blue Line did not operate.

On January 4, 1981, route J12 was truncated even further to only operate between the Addison Road station and Andrews Air Force Base.

WMATA also introduced new Routes J11, J13, J14, and J15 around this time. Route J11 would operate between Addison Road station and Andrews Air Force Base, operating the weekday middays alongside the J12, except it would operate via the Machinists Place Building. During weekday early morning weekday times before Metrorail opens, J11 would operate on special southbound trips alongside the J13, from Federal Triangle towards Andrews Air Force Base, bypassing Addison Road station altogether. Route J13 would operate along the original J12 route between Andrews Air Force Base and Federal Triangle when Metrorail was closed. Routes J14 and J15 would operate between Addison Road station & Ritchie, via Addison Road, Central Avenue, Larchmont Avenue, Marlboro Pike, Kipling Parkway, Ritchie Road, Ashwood Drive, Dunmore Place, Edgeworth Drive, Central Avenue (J15), Brightseat Road (J15), CentrePointe Office Park (J15), Hampton Mall (J15), and Hampton Park Boulevard (J15). Both routes J14 & J15 would operate all-day service on weekdays, in a counterclockwise manner, meaning in the exact opposite directions of each other. Route J14 would only operate during midday hours while J15 operated during the weekday peak hours in the peak direction.

On January 13, 2001, when the Green Line extension to Branch Avenue was complete, routes J11, J12, & J13 were rerouted to operate to between Potomac Avenue station (J11 rush hour trips only, J13)/Addison Road station J11 & J12 only and Forestville (8411 Old Marlboro Pike) instead of Andrews Air Force Base, by diverting from the intersection of Forestville Road onto the intersection of Pennsylvania Avenue and then J12 & J13, making a turn onto the intersection of Old Marlboro Pike to reach the Forestville terminus. Route J11 would continue to still operate by diverting onto the intersection of Pennsylvania Avenue and turning onto the intersection of Presidential Parkway/Machinists Place to serve the Machinists Place building.

The segment of Routes J11, J12, and J13's routing on Forestville Road between the intersections of Suitland Parkway & Allentown Road and the intersection of Forestville Road & Andrews Air Force Base Gates, was replaced by both Routes K11 and K12, which were extended from their original terminus to terminate at the newly opened Branch Avenue station.

In October 2001, due to heightened security at the Andrews Air Force Base, in response to the September 11 attacks, Routes J11, J12, and J13 were no longer allowed to enter inside the Andrews Air Force Base gates and were truncated to only operate to Forestville (8431 Old Marlboro Pike) instead. Due to the unexpected nature of these changes, WMATA was not able to update its schedule to reflect those route changes until June 30, 2002.

On December 18, 2004, when Morgan Boulevard & Largo Town Center stations opened, routes J14 and J15 were discontinued and replaced by Prince George's County TheBus Route 24. Route 24 was extended from its original terminus at District Heights, to operate up to the newly opened Morgan Boulevard station, via Kipling Parkway, Ritchie Road, Ashwood Drive, Dunmore Place, Edgeworth Drive, Ritchie Road, Central Avenue, Hampton Mall, Hampton Park Boulevard, and Brightseat Road to replace the J14 and J15. Despite this route change, Prince George's County TheBus Route 24 still kept operating on the segment of its route by the Penn Mar Shopping Center in Forestville, Maryland.

On June 24, 2007, as the Blue Line began operating earlier, northbound J13 trips operating from Forestville towards Federal Triangle as well as the special southbound J11 trip operating back from Federal Triangle towards Forestville (bypassing Addison Road station) were discontinued.

On June 26, 2016, both routes J11 & J13 were discontinued and fully replaced by route J12. Peak hour route J11 trips to Machinists Place Building were renamed route J12,

In 2016, WMATA proposed to reroute the J12 to serve Capitol Heights station, discontinuing service along Central Avenue to Addison Road station. WMATA also proposed to reroute the line into the Penn Mar Shopping Center via Donnell Drive for improved transfer opportunities to Routes K12, V12 and TheBus 20. However none of the proposals went through. The same proposal came up during WMATA's FY2019 budget proposal, with only the Capitol Heights reroute being mentioned.

During the COVID-19 pandemic, the line was reduced to operate on its Saturday supplemental schedule beginning on March 16, 2020. Beginning on March 18, 2020, the line was further reduced to operate on its Sunday schedule. Weekend service was also suspended beginning on March 21, 2020. The line restored its full schedule beginning on August 23, 2020.

In 2024 during WMATA's FY2024 Budget crisis, WMATA proposed to eliminate all J12 service. However on April 25, 2024, Metro’s Board of Directors approved a $4.8 billion capital and operating budget which avoided service cuts.

On June 16, 2024, all service to the Machinists Place Building was eliminated.

=== Better Bus Redesign ===
In 2022, WMATA launched its Better Bus Redesign project, which aimed to redesign the entire Metrobus Network and is the first full redesign of the agency's bus network in its history.

In April 2023, WMATA launched its Draft Visionary Network. As part of the drafts, WMATA proposed to split the J12 into two routes. The J12 portion between Addison Road station and the intersection of Marlboro Pike & Donnell Drive was made into its own route and named Route MD260. J12 service to Presidential Parkway/Machinists Building was taken over by the K12, was named Route MD261, and operated between Suitland station and the Presidential Parkway via the K12 routing between Suitland station and the intersection of Forrestville Road & Pennsylvania Avenue, then operate via Pennsylvania Avenue and Presidential Parkway.

During the proposal, WMATA retained both the MD260 and MD261 and renamed the Routes to the P67 (MD260) and P66 (MD261). The P67 would keep the same routing as the proposed Route MD260, but the P66 was modified to operate on the J12 Forrestville loop along Pennsylvania Avenue, Old Marlboro Pike, Suitland Parkway, and Forrestville Road, as service to Presidential Parkway/Machinists Building was eliminated in June 2024. The remaining routing would remain the same from the proposed Route MD261. All changes were then proposed during WMATA's 2025 Proposed Network.

During the proposals, the P67 was dropped completely in favor of Routes P61 and P62. Route P66 was not affected by the changes.

On November 21, 2024, WMATA approved its Better Bus Redesign Network, with service on the Marlboro Pike Line being simplified.

Beginning on June 29, 2025, Route J12 was discontinued, with the portion between Penn Mar Shopping Center and the Forestville loop being combined with the K12, operating between Suitland station and Forestville and renamed to the P66. Service between Addison Road station and Penn Mar Shopping Center was taken over by TheBus Route P76.
