= MLK Highway–Suitland Line =

P60
- MLK Highway–Suitland Line

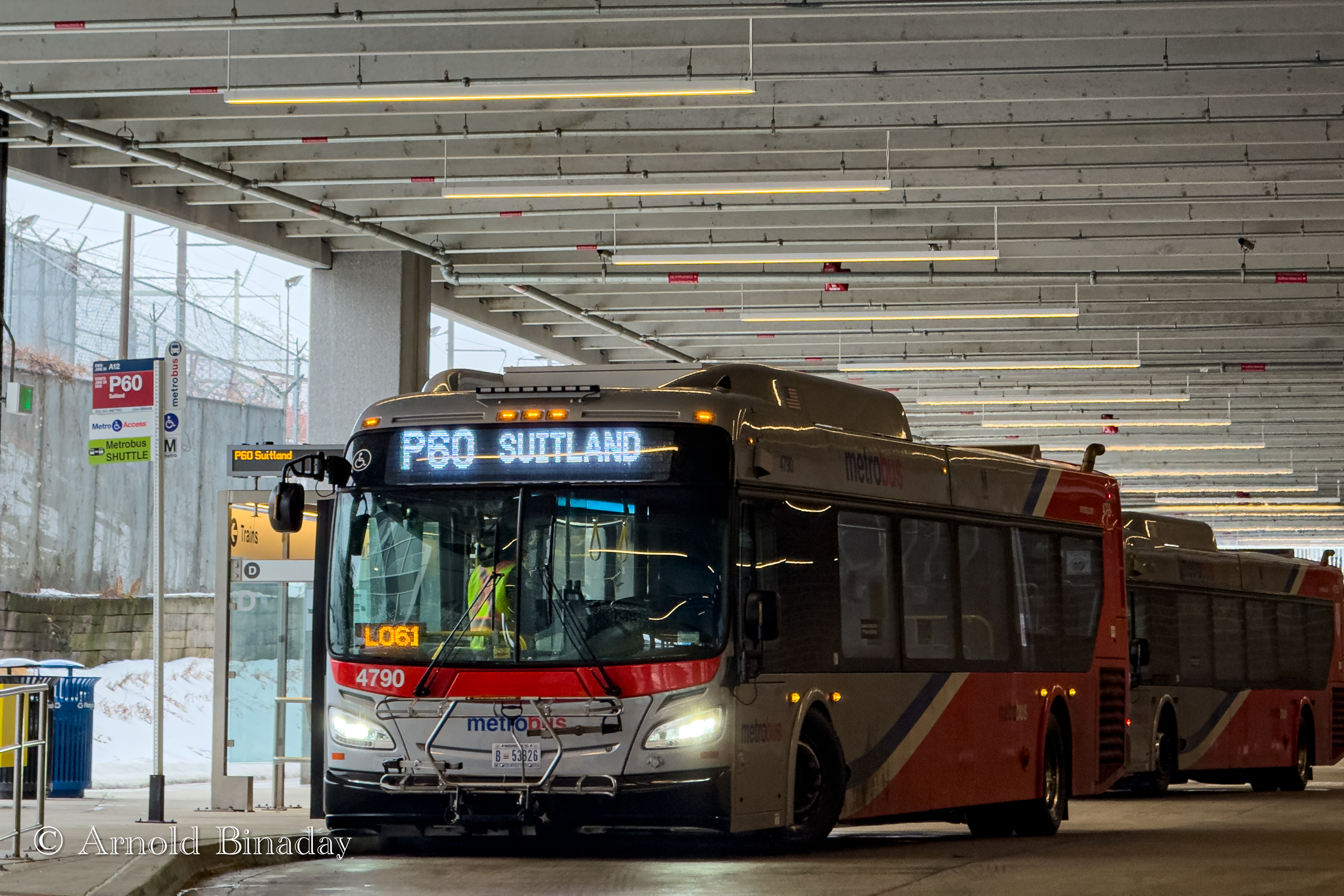
- Route P60 at New Carrollton station

Overview
- System: Metrobus
- Operator: Washington Metropolitan Area Transit Authority
- Garage: Landover
- Livery: Local
- Status: Active
- Began service: 1978
- Predecessors: A11, A12, A13, A15, A17

Route
- Locale: Prince George's County
- Communities served: New Carrollton, Glenarden, Landover, Walker Mill, Seat Pleasant, District Heights, Suitland
- Landmarks served: New Carrollton station, Addison Road station, Suitland station
- Start: New Carrollton station
- Via: Ardwick-Ardmore Road, Martin Luther King Jr Highway, Addison Road, Walker Mill Road, County Road, Old Silver Hill Road, Silver Hill Road
- End: Suitland station

Service
- Level: Daily
- Frequency: 12 minutes (5 AM - 9 PM Daily); 30 minutes (After 9 PM)
- Operates: 5:00 AM – 2:00 AM
- Ridership: 663,441 (FY 2025)
- Transfers: SmarTrip only
- Timetable: MLK Highway-Suitland Line

The MLK Highway–Suitland Line, designated Route P60 is a daily bus route operated by the Washington Metropolitan Area Transit Authority between New Carrollton station of the Orange and Silver Lines of the Washington Metro and Suitland station of the Green Line of the Washington Metro. The line operates every 12 minutes daily between 5 AM and 9 PM and 30 minutes after 9 PM. Route P60 trips roughly take 45 minutes.

== Route ==
Route P60 operates daily between New Carrollton station and Suitland station providing service among the Landover community, primarily operating along Martin Luther King Jr Highway. Route P60 gets its buses out of Landover division.

=== Former A12 Stops ===
Bus stop	Direction	Connections
Prince George's County, Maryland
Capitol Heights Bus Bay B	Northbound station, Southbound terminal (Sundays only)	Metrobus: 96, F14, V2, V4, X9; TheBus: 24, 25; Washington Metro:
East Capitol Street / Maryland Park Drive	Bidirectional (Sundays only)	Metrobus: F14; TheBus: 24, 25
East Capitol Street / Yost Place	Bidirectional (Sundays only)	Metrobus: F14; TheBus: 24, 25
Addison Road-Seat Pleasant Bus Bay D	Northbound station, Southbound terminal (Monday-Saturday); Bidirectional (Sundays only)	Metrobus: C21, C22, C27, C29, J12, F14, P12, V12, V14; TheBus: 18, 20, 23 Washington Metro:
Addison Road / Adak Street	Bidirectional	TheBus: 18
Addison Road / Adel Street	Bidirectional	TheBus: 18
Addison Road / Baltic Street	Bidirectional	TheBus: 18
Addison Road / Crown Street	Bidirectional	TheBus: 18
Addison Road / Dry Log Street	Bidirectional	TheBus: 18
Addison Road / Eads Street	Bidirectional	TheBus: 18
Addison Road / Seat Pleasant Drive	Northbound	Metrobus: V14; TheBus: 18
Addison Road / James Farmer Way	Southbound	Metrobus: V14; TheBus: 18
Martin Luther King Highway / Addison Road	Northbound	TheBus: 18
Martin Luther King Highway / 65th Avenue	Southbound	TheBus: 18
Martin Luther King Highway / 69th Place	Bidirectional	TheBus: 18
Martin Luther King Highway / Greig Street	Bidirectional	TheBus: 18
Martin Luther King Highway / 69th Place	Bidirectional	TheBus: 18
Martin Luther King Highway / Glen Willow Drive	Bidirectional	TheBus: 18
Martin Luther King Highway / Carrington Avenue	Bidirectional	TheBus: 18
Martin Luther King Highway / Hill Road	Northbound	TheBus: 18
Martin Luther King Highway / Southland Drive	Southbound	TheBus: 18
Martin Luther King Highway / Sheriff Road	Bidirectional	Metrobus: F14; TheBus: 18, 23
Martin Luther King Highway / Roosevelt Avenue	Bidirectional	Metrobus: F14; TheBus: 18
Martin Luther King Highway / Ryderwood Court	Bidirectional	Metrobus: F14; TheBus: 18
Martin Luther King Highway / King Shopping Center	Bidirectional	Metrobus: F14; TheBus: 18
Martin Luther King Highway / Columbia Park Road	Southbound	Metrobus: F12, F14; TheBus: 18
Martin Luther King Highway / Belle Haven Drive	Northbound	Metrobus: F12, F14; TheBus: 18
Martin Luther King Highway / East Ridge Drive	Southbound	Metrobus: F12
Martin Luther King Highway / Flagstaff Street	Northbound	Metrobus: F12
Martin Luther King Highway / Greenleaf Road	Bidirectional	Metrobus: F12
Greenleaf Road / Muncy Road	Southbound	Metrobus: L12
Greenleaf Road / Normandy Road	Bidirectional	Metrobus: L12
Greenleaf Road / Romney Court	Bidirectional	Metrobus: L12
Greenleaf Road / Matthew Henson Avenue	Bidirectional	Metrobus: L12
Matthew Henson Avenue / Barlowe Road	Northbound	Metrobus: L12
Barlowe Road / Palmer Park Road	Bidirectional	Metrobus: L12
Barlowe Road / Ray Leonard Road	Bidirectional	Metrobus: L12
Barlowe Road / Allendale Drive	Bidirectional	Metrobus: L12
Barlowe Road / Landover Road	Bidirectional	Metrobus: L12
Brightseat Road / Maple Ridge Apartments	Bidirectional	Metrobus: F14; TheBus: 21, 21X, 22
Brightseat Road / Maple Ridge Apartments	Southbound	Metrobus: F14; TheBus: 21, 21X, 22
Brightseat Road / Evarts Street	Bidirectional	Metrobus: F14; TheBus: 21, 22
Brightseat Road / Girard Street	Northbound	Metrobus: F14; TheBus: 21, 21X
Brightseat Road / Hamlin Street	Bidirectional	Metrobus: F14; TheBus: 21
Brightseat Road / Reicher Street	Bidirectional	Metrobus: F14; TheBus: 21
Brightseat Road / McLain Street	Northbound	Metrobus: F14; TheBus: 21
Glenarden Parkway / Wesley Street	Bidirectional	Metrobus: F14
Glenarden Parkway / Reed Street	Bidirectional	Metrobus: F14
Glenarden Parkway / Municipal Center	Bidirectional	Metrobus: F14
Glenarden Parkway / Martin Luther King Jr. Highway	Southbound	Metrobus: F14
Glenarden Parkway / Hayes Street	Northbound	Metrobus: F14
Hayes Street / Glenarden Parkway	Southbound	Metrobus: F14
Hayes Street / Johnson Avenue	Bidirectional	Metrobus: F14
Johnson Avenue / Hayes Street	Northbound	Metrobus: F14
Johnson Avenue / Martin Luther King Jr. Highway	Southbound	Metrobus: F14
Martin Luther King Jr. Highway / Reed Street	Northbound	Metrobus: F14
Martin Luther King Jr. Highway / Dellwood Court	Southbound	Metrobus: F14
Ardwick Ardmore Road / West Street	Northbound	Metrobus: F14; TheBus: 21
Ardwick Ardmore Road / Preston Drive	Southbound	Metrobus: F14; TheBus: 21
Ardwick Ardmore Road / #8335-8361	Southbound	Metrobus: F14; TheBus: 21
Ardwick Ardmore Road / Whitetire Road	Bidirectional	Metrobus: F14; TheBus: 21
Ardwick Ardmore Road / Ardwick Place	Bidirectional	Metrobus: F12, F14; TheBus: 21
Ardwick Ardmore Road / Pennsy Drive	Southbound	Metrobus: F12, F14; TheBus: 21
Corporate Drive / Garden City Drive	Northbound	Metrobus: F12, F14
New Carrollton Bus Bay C	Southbound station, Northbound terminal	Metrobus: B21, B22, B24, B27, F4, F6, F12, F13, F14, G12, G14, T14, T18; MTA Maryland Commuter Bus; TheBus: 15X, 16, 21, 21X; Greyhound; Peter Pan Bus Lines; Washington Metro: MARC: Penn Line; Amtrak: Northeast Regional, Palmetto, Vermonter; MTA: Purple Line (Planned)

== History ==
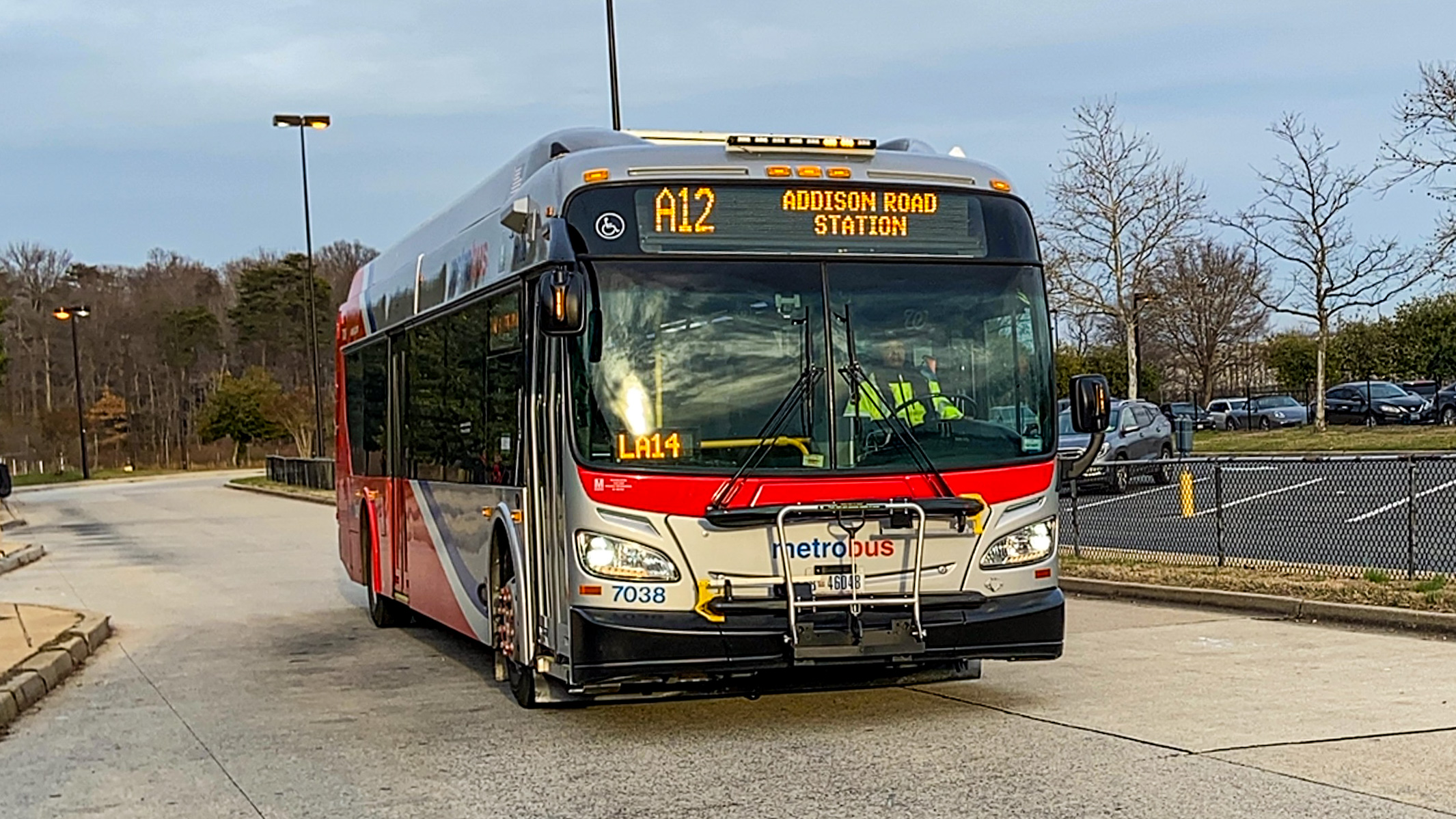
Former Route A12 at Landover station in January 2020

The Martin Luther King Jr. Highway Line began in 1978 consisting of routes A11, A12, A13, A15, and A17. Routes A11 and A12 operated between Capital Plaza and Federal Triangle in Downtown Washington D.C., via Annapolis Road, Baltimore Washington Parkway, Landover Road, Palmer Highway, Marlboro Pike, Pennsylvania Avenue, Independence Avenue, and Constitution Avenue. Route A13 operated between Federal Triangle and Washington Business Park and routes A15 and A17 provided weekday peak hour service between Dodge Park and Federal Triangle.

Route A12 originally operated by the Bradbury Heights Bus Line as the Kent Village Line in 1922. It then operated under the Washington Marlboro & Annapolis Motor Lines Inc. (WM&A). It also operated under the District Heights Line but was later replaced by the P12 and V14. The line was later acquired by WMATA on February 4, 1973.

On November 21, 1978 when Landover station opened, routes A11, A13, A15, and A17 were discontinued and route A12 was shorten to Potomac Avenue station discontinuing service to Downtown. Routes A11, A15, and A17 were replaced by both route A12 and the Orange Line while route A13 was replaced by route F13.

On November 22, 1980, when Addison Road station and Capitol Heights station opened, A12 was shortened even further to operate between Capital Plaza and Addison Road station Mondays through Saturdays, as both the Orange and Blue Lines would provide much faster and direct service between much of Prince George's County and Downtown Washington D.C. Route A12 was also extended to operate to Capitol Heights station via, East Capitol Street on Sundays replacing a portion of route F14 which doesn't operate on Sundays.

Route A11 was also reincarnated on November 22, 1980 to make a one way trip between Capital Plaza to Federal Triangle on Saturday mornings only before the first Orange Line trip from the New Carrollton station departs. Route A11 would mainly operate using the A12's former routing between Capital Plaza and the Federal Triangle in Downtown Washington D.C., except it would not serve Landover station.

In 1983, route A15 was reincarnated to operate between Capital Plaza and Addison Road station via Landsdowne Village Apartments in Landover during weekday peak periods using the same routing as A12 but instead serving Landsdowne Village Apartments.

On December 15, 2004, route A15 was discontinued and replaced by routes A11, A12, and Prince George's County's The Bus Route 22. Alternative service was provided by routes A12 between Capital Plaza and Landover Mall and The Bus Route 22 operated between Landover Mall and Landsdowne Village Apartments, via Morgan Boulevard station.

Even after Landover Mall had closed in 2002, routes A11 & A12 would still loop around the former mall due to Sears still being opened. On March 30, 2014, both A11 & A12 were rerouted to no longer serve the former site of the Landover Mall and were rerouted to operate along Brightseat Road, Glenarden Parkway, Ardwick Ardmore Road, Martin Luther King Jr. Highway, via route F14's routing, to provide weekly Metrobus service to Glenarden, due to Sears announcing that its Landover store will close in March 2014. This routing gives direct bus service to Landover station as it was only previously provided between Glenarden and New Carrollton station.

In 2014, WMATA proposed to split the A12 into two routes, with the A12 running between Addison Road station and New Carrollton station via Brightseat Road and Ardwick Industrial Park and discontinuing service to Capital Plaza and Landover station, primarily running along Martin Luther King Jr. Highway. A new Route L12 would operate the A12 routing between Capital Plaza and Largo Town Center (now Downtown Largo) station via Landover station and Woodmore Town Centre, primarily running on Landover Road via Palmer Park and Hawthorne Street, running along the old A12 routing. Stops between Martin Luther King Jr. Hwy and Brightseat Road will be replaced by a rerouted route F14 which will discontinue service along a portion of Brightseat Road being replaced by Route A12. Public feedback however opposed to the changes and the reroutes were not implemented.

On March 29, 2015, route A11 was discontinued making route A12 the only Route to operate the Martin Luther King Jr. Highway Line.

During the COVID-19 pandemic, route A12 was reduced to operate on its Saturday supplemental schedule beginning on March 16, 2020. However beginning on March 18, 2020, route A12 was further reduced to operate on its Sunday schedule operating between Capital Plaza and Capitol Heights station. Weekend service was also suspended beginning on March 21, 2020. Weekend service was restored on a limited basis on July 18, 2020. Full service resumed on August 23, 2020.

In February 2021 during WMATA's FY2022 budget crisis, WMATA proposed to add late-night service to 2:00 AM on Route A12 beginning in July 2021, but would reduce it back to midnight beginning in January 2022. Subsequently on April 22, 2021, WMATA approved the FY2022 budget and received federal funding to avoid service cuts.

On June 6, 2021, late-night service was increased to operate up to 2:00 AM on Route A12.

On June 10, 2021, WMATA proposed to increase the A12 to operate every 20 minutes daily between 7:00 AM to 9:00 PM daily as part of WMATA's Pandemic Recovery Plan. On September 5, 2021, Route A12 service was increased to operate every 20 minutes daily between 7:00 AM and 9:00 PM.

Due to rising cases of the COVID-19 Omicron variant, the line was reduced to its Saturday service on weekdays beginning on January 10, 2022. Full weekday service resumed on February 7, 2022.

In 2023, WMATA brought back the proposed A12 and L12 route split, which is roughly the same as the 2014 proposals; however, the F14 would not be rerouted along Brightseat Road.

On June 25, 2023, route A12 was changed to operate between Addison Road station to New Carrollton station following its regular route between Addison Road and the intersection of Glenarden Parkway & Martin Luther King Jr. Highway, then operate along the F14 route between Hayes Street, Johnson Avenue, Ardwick-Ardmore Road and Pennsy Drive to New Carrollton. A12 service between Capital Plaza and Landover Road & Barlowe Road was replaced by Route L12, which operates between Capital Plaza Mall and Downtown Largo station via Woodmore Towne Centre.

In 2024 during WMATA's FY2024 Budget crisis, WMATA proposed to eliminate all A12 service after midnight daily, reduce the frequency of buses from 20 minutes to 30 minutes, and eliminate the Sunday segment between Addison Road and Capitol Heights station. However on April 25, 2024, Metro’s Board of Directors approved a $4.8 billion capital and operating budget which avoided service cuts.

=== Better Bus Redesign ===
In 2022, WMATA launched its Better Bus Redesign project, which aimed to redesign the entire Metrobus Network and is the first full redesign of the agency's bus network in its history.

In April 2023, WMATA launched its Draft Visionary Network. Despite the A12 split not being implemented yet, WMATA still included the A12 split proposals alongside the L12 in the drafts.

As part of the drafts, WMATA proposed to modify the A12 to no longer operate inside Glenarden or Palmer Park and instead remain straight along Martin Luther King Jr. Highway between New Carrollton and Addison Road stations, being renamed to Route MD147. Service was also combined with the P12 and was extended to Suitland station via Addison Road, Walker Mill Road, County Road, and Silver Hill Road. This proposed change was made before WMATA implemented the A12/L12 split in June 2023.

The A12 portion along Landover Road was modified into different routes. The portion between Prince George's Hospital and the intersection of Landover Road & Brightseat Road was changed to operate between Prince George's Hospital and Downtown Largo station via Hospital Drive, Landover Road, Pennsy Drive, Landover station, Pinebrook Avenue, Hawthrone Avenue, Fire House Road, Landover Road, Martin Luther King Jr. Highway, Greenleaf Road, Barlowe Road, Landover Road, St. Josephs Drive, Ruby Lockhart Boulevard, Woodmore Town Centre, Lottsford Road, Largo Drive West, and Harry S Truman Drive. The line was named Route MD256. This route would later become the L12 in June 2023, with the route also serving Capital Plaza.

The A12 portion between Landover station and Capital Plaza via Pennsy Drive, Landover Road, Hospital Drive, Prince George's Hospital, the Baltimore–Washington Parkway, and Annapolis Road was extended to operate to College Park–University of Maryland station via Annapolis Road, Veterans Parkway, Riverdale Road, Auburn Avenue, Good Luck Road, and Paint Branch Parkway. The line was named Route MD255.

Service along the Glenarden loop via Brightseat Road, Martin Luther King Jr. Highway, and Ardwick Ardmore Road was taken over by the proposed Route MD257, MD357, and MD363.

Before WMATA's Revised Draft Visionary Network, WMATA implemented the L12 between Capital Plaza and Downtown Largo station via Landover Road. This change was essentially the proposed MD256 routing with the extension to Capital Plaza. As a result, the proposed MD255 was dropped from the proposals, and Route MD256 was renamed to Route P41, with service operating along the current Route MD256 and L12 routing, but service to Prince George's Hospital was not included in the proposal. WMATA also renamed the proposed Route MD147 to the P60, keeping the proposed routing for the 2025 proposed network. All changes were then proposed during WMATA's 2025 Proposed Network.

On November 21, 2024, WMATA approved its Better Bus Redesign Network.

Beginning on June 29, 2025, the A12 was modified to no longer operate inside Glenarden or Palmer Park, and instead remain straight along Martin Luther King Jr. Highway between New Carrollton and Addison Road station. The route then combines with the P12, operating between Addison Road and Suitland station. The new line was renamed to the P60. The A12 designation was given to the former 10B route.
