= Eastover–Addison Road Line =

WMATA bus route

P12
- Eastover–Addison Road Line

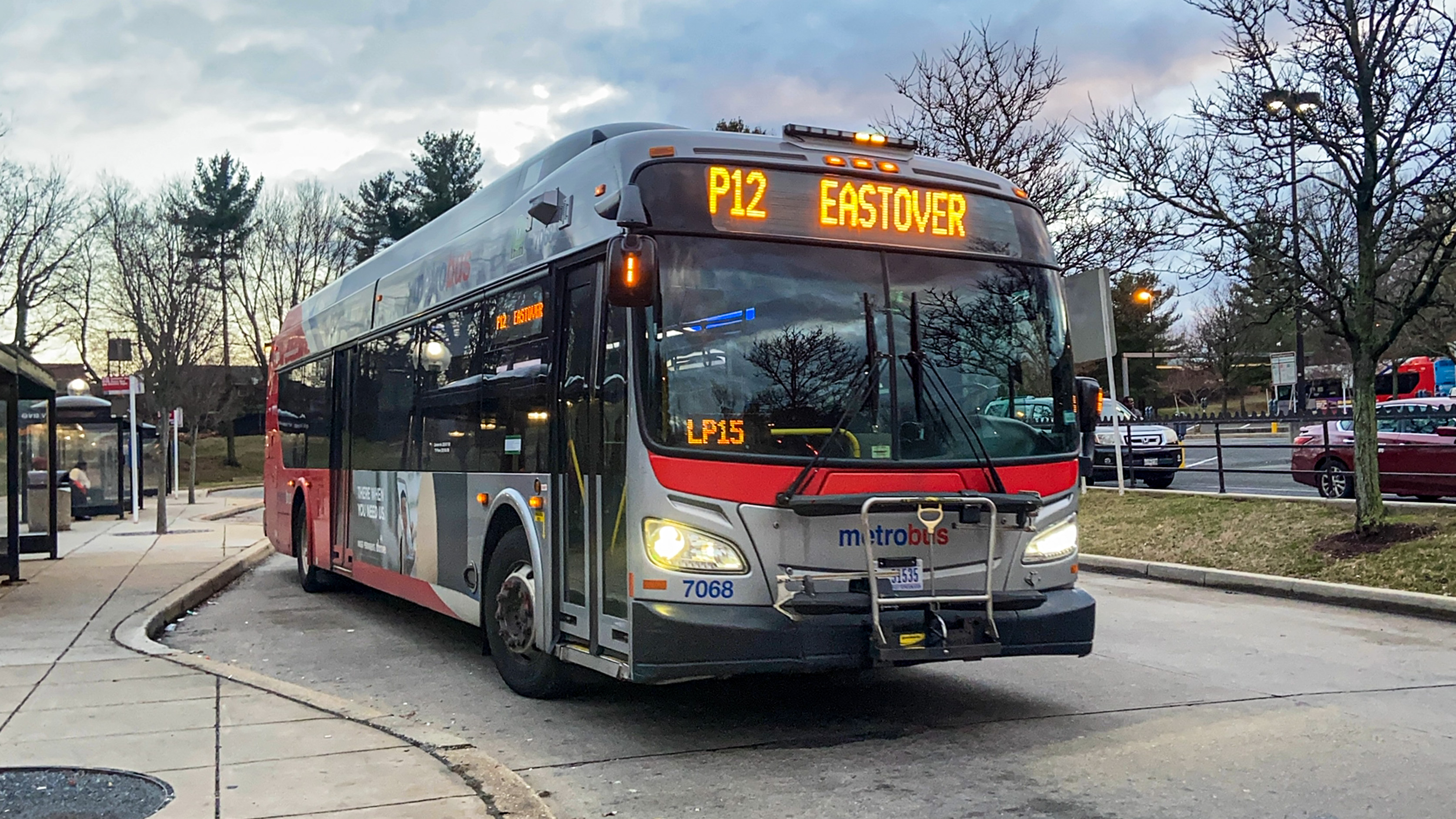
- P12 at Addison Road station

Overview
- System: Metrobus
- Operator: Washington Metropolitan Area Transit Authority
- Garage: Landover
- Livery: Local
- Status: Discontinued
- Began service: 1965
- Ended service: June 29, 2025

Route
- Locale: Prince George's County
- Communities served: Capitol Heights, Coral Hills, Walker Mill, District Heights, Suitland, Silver Hill, Hillcrest Heights, Glassmanor, Forest Heights
- Landmarks served: Southview, United Medical Center, Southern Avenue station, Iverson Mall, Suitland station
- Start: Addison Road station
- Via: Addison Road, Silver Hill Road, Iverson Street
- End: Eastover Shopping Center
- Length: 60 minutes

Service
- Level: Daily
- Frequency: 12 minutes (7 AM - 9 PM); 30 minutes (After 9 PM)
- Journey time: 4:45 AM - 2:00 AM
- Ridership: 2,529,161 (FY 2024)
- Transfers: SmarTrip only
- Timetable: Eastover-Addison Road Line

The Eastover–Addison Road Line, designated Route P12, was a daily bus route operated by the Washington Metropolitan Area Transit Authority between the Addison Road station of the Blue & Silver Lines of the Washington Metro and Eastover Shopping Center in Forest Heights, Maryland. The line operated every 12 minutes between 7AM and 9PM and 30 minutes after 9PM. P12 trips were roughly 60 minutes long.

== Background ==
Route P12 operated daily between Addison Road station and Eastover Shopping Center via Southern Avenue station and Suitland station. The line mostly provided service along Addison Road, Silver Hill Road and Iverson Street connecting many neighborhoods to various Metrorail stations. The P12 operated every 12 minutes between 7AM and 9PM and 30 minutes after 9PM daily.

Route P12 operated out of Landover division.

=== P12 Stops ===
Bus stop	Direction	Connections
Prince George's County, Maryland
Addison Road station Bus Bay C	Westbound station, Eastbound terminal	Metrobus: A12, C21, C22, C27, C29, J12, F14, V12, V14; TheBus: 18, 20, 23 Washington Metro:
Addison Road / St. Margaret's Church	Bidirectional	TheBus: 20
Addison Road / Ernie Banks Street	Bidirectional	TheBus: 20
Addison Road / Wilburn Drive	Bidirectional	TheBus: 20
Addison Road / Gethsemane United Methodist Church	Bidirectional	
Addison Road / Ronald Road	Bidirectional	TheBus: 20
Addison Road / Walker Mill Road	Bidirectional	TheBus: 20
Addison Road / St. Paul Baptist Church	Bidirectional	Metrobus: V12
Walker Mill Road / Rochelle Avenue	Bidirectional	Metrobus: V12, V14; TheBus: 20
Walker Mill Road / County Road	Eastbound	Metrobus: V14
County Road / #2004-#2008	Eastbound	
County Road / Tilghman's Lane	Westbound	
County Road / Atwood Street	Bidirectional	TheBus: 20
County Road / Belwood Street	Bidirectional	TheBus: 20
County Road / District Heights Parkway	Bidirectional	
County Road / Elmhurst Street	Bidirectional	TheBus: 20
County Road / Foster Street	Bidirectional	TheBus: 20
Old Silver Hill Road / Parkland Drive	Bidirectional	Metrobus: J12, V12; TheBus: 24
Old Silver Hill Road / Parkland Court	Bidirectional	TheBus: 24
Old Silver Hill Road / Kentucky Avenue	Bidirectional	TheBus: 24
Silver Hill Road / Pennsylvania Avenue	Westbound	TheBus: 24 (Westbound only)
Silver Hill Road / West Avenue	Bidirectional	Metrobus: K12
Silver Hill Road / Plaza Drive	Eastbound	Metrobus: K12
Silver Hill Road / Silver Hill Court	Westbound	Metrobus: K12
Silver Hill Road / Royal Plaza Drive	Bidirectional	Metrobus: K12
Silver Hill Road / Sunset Lane	Eastbound	Metrobus: K12
Silver Hill Road / Brooks Drive	Westbound	Metrobus: K12
Silver Hill Road / Porter Avenue	Bidirectional	Metrobus: K12
Silver Hill Road / Suitland Road	Bidirectional	Metrobus: D14, K12, V12; TheBus: 34
Silver Hill Road / Swann Road	Bidirectional	Metrobus: D14, K12, V12; TheBus: 34
Silver Hill Road / Randall Road	Bidirectional	Metrobus: D14, K12, V12; TheBus: 34
Silver Hill Road / Parkway Terrace Drive	Eastbound	Metrobus: D14, K12, V12; TheBus: 34
Suitland Station Roadway / Suitland Federal Center	Bidirectional	Metrobus: D12, D14, K12, V12; TheBus: 34; MTA Maryland Bus: 735, 850
Suitland station Bus Bays M and N	Bidirectional	Metrobus: D12, D14, K12, V12; TheBus: 34; MTA Maryland Bus: 735, 850; Washington Metro:
Silver Hill Road / Maywood Lane	Bidirectional	Metrobus: D12
Silver Hill Road / Terrace Drive	Bidirectional	Metrobus: D12
Silver Hill Road / Silver Park Drive	Bidirectional	Metrobus: D12
Silver Hill Road / St. Barnabas Road	Eastbound	Metrobus: D12
Silver Hill Road Road / Old Silver Hill Road	Westbound	Metrobus: D12
Iverson Street / Branch Avenue The Shops at Iverson	Bidirectional	Metrobus: C12, C14, H13; TheBus: 32
Iverson Street / 28th Avenue	Bidirectional	Metrobus: C12; TheBus: 32
Iverson Street / 26th Avenue	Bidirectional	Metrobus: C12, H12
Iverson Street / 25th Avenue	Bidirectional	Metrobus: C12, H12
Iverson Street / 24th Street	Bidirectional	Metrobus: C12, H12
Iverson Street / 23rd Place	Bidirectional	Metrobus: C12, H12
Iverson Street / 23rd Parkway	Bidirectional	Metrobus: C12, H12
Iverson Street / 22nd Avenue	Bidirectional	
Iverson Street / 21st Avenue	Bidirectional	
Iverson Street / 19th Place	Westbound	
Iverson Street / Iverson Place	Eastbound	
Iverson Place / #4707	Westbound	
Iverson Place / #4708	Eastbound	
Wheeler Road / Iverson Place	Bidirectional	
Wheeler Road / Manor Drive	Bidirectional	
Wheeler Road / Leland Drive	Eastbound	
Wheeler Road / Brierfield Road	Westbound	
Wheeler Road / Calais Court	Bidirectional	
Wheeler Road / Vermillion Avenue	Bidirectional	
Wheeler Hills Road / Wheeler Road	Bidirectional	
Wheeler Hills Road / #4551	Bidirectional	
Forest Hills Apartments / Wheeler Hills Road	Westbound	
Forest Hills Apartments / #1417	Eastbound	
Forest Hills Apartments / Rental Office	Bidirectional	
Forest Hill Apartments / Southern Avenue	Westbound	Metrobus: A2, D12, D14, NH1, W2; TheBus: 33, 35, 37
Southern Avenue / #1380	Bidirectional	Metrobus: A2, D12, D14, NH1, W2, W14; TheBus: 33, 35, 37
Southern Avenue station Bus Bays E and N	Bidirectional	Metrobus: 32, A2, A32, D12, D14, NH1, P18, W1, W2, W14; TheBus: 33, 35, 37; Washington Metro:
Southern Avenue / #1380	Bidirectional	Metrobus: A2, D12, D14, NH1, W2; TheBus: 33, 35, 37
Southern Avenue / United Medical Center	Westbound	Metrobus: A2, D12, D14, NH1, W2; TheBus: 33, 35, 37
Southern Avenue / Forest Hills Apartments	Eastbound	Metrobus: A2, D12, D14, NH1, W2; TheBus: 33, 35, 37
Southern Avenue / 13th Street SE	Bidirectional	Metrobus: A2, D12, D14, NH1, P18, W2, W14; TheBus: 33, 35, 37
Southern Avenue / Wheeler Road	Bidirectional	Metrobus: A2, A6, A7, D12, D14, NH1; TheBus: 33, 35, 37
Southern Avenue / 9th Street SE	Bidirectional	Metrobus: A6, A7, D12, D14, NH1; TheBus: 33, 35, 37
Southern Avenue / Chesapeake Street SE	Bidirectional	Metrobus: A6, A7, D12, D14, NH1, P18, W14; TheBus: 33, 35, 37
Southview Drive / Southview Court	Bidirectional	Metrobus: NH1
Southview Drive / #1125	Westbound	Metrobus: NH1
Southview Drive / #1224	Eastbound	Metrobus: NH1
Southview Drive / #1271	Bidirectional	Metrobus: NH1
Southview Drive / #1333	Bidirectional	Metrobus: NH1
Southview Drive / #1373	Bidirectional	Metrobus: NH1
Southview Drive / #1510	Bidirectional	Metrobus: NH1
Iverson Street / Sutler Drive	Bidirectional	Metrobus: NH1
Iverson Street / #1305	Eastbound	Metrobus: NH1
Iverson Street / #1306	Westbound	Metrobus: NH1
Iverson Street / Owens Road	Bidirectional	Metrobus: NH1; TheBus: 33
Owens Road / #1100	Bidirectional	Metrobus: NH1; TheBus: 33
Kennebec Street / Owens Road	Bidirectional	Metrobus: NH1; TheBus: 33
Kennebec Street / #1101	Eastbound	
Kennebec Street / #1100	Westbound	
Kennebec Street / Glassmanor Drive	Eastbound	
Kennebec Street / Deal Drive	Westbound	Metrobus: D12
Deal Drive / Audrey Lane	Westbound	Metrobus: D12
Audrey Lane / Deal Drive	Eastbound	Metrobus: D12
Audrey Lane / #632	Westbound	Metrobus: D12
Audrey Lane / Neptune Avenue	Bidirectional	Metrobus: D12
Audrey Lane / Eastover Park & Ride Lot (Eastover)	Eastbound station, Westbound terminal	Metrobus: D12, D14, P18, W14; TheBus: 35, 37
Eastover Shopping Center / #5035B	Eastbound	
Eastover Shopping Center / Dollar Tree	Eastbound	
Eastover Shopping Center / Giant Super Market	Eastbound	
Audrey Lane / Indian Head Highway	Eastbound	Metrobus: D12, D14, P18, W14; TheBus: 35, 37

== History ==
Route P12 was created as a brand new bus route by the WM&A Bus Company in 1965, to operate as part of the District Heights-Silver Hill Road Line between the Eastover Shopping Center in Forest Heights, Maryland and the intersection of Shady Glen Drive and Central Avenue along Walker Mill Road. P12 was eventually converted into a WMATA Metrobus Route on February 4, 1973, when WMATA acquired all four bus companies that operated throughout the Washington D.C. Metropolitan Area and merged them to form its own Metrobus System.

On December 3, 1978, route P12 was extended from its original terminus at the intersection of Shady Glen Drive & Central Avenue to Deanwood station beginning on December 3, 1978. The name of the P12 was also changed to the Eastover–Deanwood Line.

On January 4, 1981, two months after the Addison Road station opened, route P12 discontinued service to Deanwood station and instead terminate at Addison Road station. Route P14 and R12 would replace the P12 between Deanwood and Addison Road stations operating along the former P12 routing. The only changes route P12 would also have was that the P12 would operate along Central Avenue to Shady Glen Drive, then turn onto Shady Glen Drive to the Eastover Shopping Center and vice versa to Addison Road. The line was then renamed the Eastover–Addison Road Line.

On January 13, 2001, when both Suitland and Southern Avenue stations opened, P12 went through a minor rerouting change to divert to Suitland and Southern Avenue stations.

In 2014, it was proposed for the P12 and V12 to swap routings between Addison Road station and the intersection of Addison Road and Walker Mill Road which will provide a more direct route for the P12 as the V12 is focused to become a neighborhood focused route. Also P12 was also proposed to terminate only at Southern Avenue station with a brand new P10 service operating between Southern Avenue and Eastover Shopping Center but discontinue service at United Medical Center with alternative service provided by the A2, W2, and W3.

This was because discontinuing service through United Medical Center property will save time and increase reliability, since buses will make fewer turns and will no longer get stuck behind illegally parked vehicles at the hospital entrance, swapping P12 and V12 routing on Walker Mill Road and Shady Glen Drive will provide a more direct route for the P12 as the V12 is already designed to be a more neighborhood-focused service, and splitting the P12 route at Southern Avenue Station will increase reliability and on time performance plus also provides the flexibility to focus future resources on the portions of the line with the highest demand. According to Performance Measures, only 11% of passengers on the route travel through Southern Avenue Station, the route averages approximately 52 passengers per hour on weekday, and 41 passengers per hour on Saturdays and Sundays north of Southern Avenue Station, and the route averages approximately 58 passengers per hour of weekdays, 54 passengers per hour on Saturdays and 56 passengers per hour on Sundays south of Southern Avenue Station.

On June 21, 2015, routes P12 and V12 swapped their routing between the intersection of Addison Road and Walker Mill Road and Addison Road station. Route P12 would operate along Addison Road, while route V12 would operate along Shady Glen Drive, Walker Mill Road, and Central Avenue. Also, route P12 discontinued service to the United Medical Center and instead serve bus stops along Southern Avenue. As a result of these changes, route P12 also became a more direct route while route V12 a neighborhood-focused route which was WMATA's "Better Bus Service" initiative program's goal.

During the COVID-19 pandemic, route P12 operated on its Saturday supplemental schedule beginning on March 16, 2020. However beginning on March 18, 2020, Route P12 began operating on its Sunday service. Weekend service was also reduced to operate every 30 minutes. Route P12 regular service was restored on August 23, 2020.

On September 5, 2021, service was increased to operate every 12 minutes daily between 7 a.m. to 9 p.m.

In 2024 during WMATA's FY2024 Budget crisis, WMATA proposed to reduce the frequency of buses from every 12 minutes to 20 minutes daily and eliminate all trips after midnight daily for the P12. However on April 25, 2024, Metro’s Board of Directors approved a $4.8 billion capital and operating budget which avoided service cuts.

On January 12, 2025, all service in the Forest Hill Apartments were eliminated, with service being rerouted along Southern Avenue SE. This is due to a cease-and-desist complaint letter from the owner of Forest Hill Apartments.

=== Better Bus Redesign ===
In 2022, WMATA launched its Better Bus Redesign project, which aimed to redesign the entire Metrobus Network and is the first full redesign of the agency's bus network in its history.

In April 2023, WMATA launched its Draft Visionary Network. As part of the drafts, WMATA proposed to split the P12 into two routes. The P12 portion between Addison Road station and Suitland station remained the same, but the route was partially combined with the A12 and was extended to New Carrollton station via Addison Road, Martin Luther King Jr. Highway, and Ardwick Ardmore Road and was named Route MD147. The P12 portion between Suitland station and Eastover Shopping Center via Southern Avenue station also remained the same and was named Route MD148. A third route, named Route MD265, would also follow the P12's routing between Southern Avenue station and the intersection of Indian Head Highway & Audrey Lane, but the route would turn onto Indian Head Highway, then operate on Livingston Road before serving Route D12's Birchwood City loop via Birchwood Drive, Galloway Drive, and Helmont Drive. Following the loop, the proposed route would continue to National Harbor via Livingston Road, Oxon Hill Park & Ride, Monument Avenue, National Harbor Boulevard, MGM National Harbor, MGM National Avenue (to Southern Avenue), and St. George Boulevard (to National Harbor).

During WMATA's Revised Draft Visionary Network, WMATA retained the Route MD147 proposal and renamed it to Route P60 and extended the route to Naylor Road station via Silver Hill Road, Iverson Street, Colebrooke Drive, and Branch Avenue, incorporating parts of Route H12. The proposed Route MD148 was also retained and was merged with the proposed Route MD265 and renamed to Route P93. The new proposed P93 would operate on the proposed MD148 portion between Suitland station and Eastover Shopping Center via Silver Hill Road, Iverson Street, Iverson Place, Wheeler Road, Forest Hill Apartments, Southern Avenue SE, Southern Avenue station, Southview Drive, Iverson Street, Owens Road, Kennebec Street, Deal Drive, and Audrey Lane. Then Route P93 would operate via the proposed MD265 routing to National Harbor via Livingston Road, Oxon Hill Park & Ride, Monument Avenue, MGM National Harbor, National Harbor Boulevard, and St. George Boulevard.

Before WMATA released the 2025 Proposed Network, WMATA dropped the P60 proposal to Naylor Road and instead incorporated it into the proposed Route P83, which would have been operated by TheBus. The P60 and P93 were then proposed during WMATA's 2025 Proposed Network.

During the proposals, the proposed Route P93 was changed to only operate up to Birchwood City via Birchwood Drive, Galloway Drive, and Helmont Drive, with the portion between Suitland station and the intersection of Livingston Road & Birchwood Drive remaining the same. A new Route P94 was proposed to operate alongside the P93 between Suitland station and National Harbor via the original proposed P93.

On November 21, 2024, WMATA approved its Better Bus Redesign Network.

Beginning on June 29, 2025, Route P12 was split into two routes. The P12 route portion between Addison Road station and Suitland station was combined with the A12 and renamed to the P60. The P12 route portion between Suitland and Eastover Shopping Center was made into Routes P93 and P94. The P93 operated between Suitland and Birchwood City via Livingston Road, while the P94 operated between Suitland and National Harbor via Livingston Road and Oxon Hill Park & Ride. The P12 designation was given to the former 89M route.

== Incidents ==
- On April 29, 2022, a person was stabbed to death after he got into an altercation with another person on board a P12 bus near Southview Court and Southview Drive in Oxon Hill. The suspect was charged with second-degree murder on May 4, 2022.
