= District Heights–Suitland Line =

V12
- District Heights-Suitland Line

Overview
- System: Metrobus
- Operator: Washington Metropolitan Area Transit Authority
- Garage: Landover
- Livery: Local
- Status: Discontinued
- Began service: December 3, 1978
- Ended service: V11: June 24, 2007; V12: June 29, 2025
- Predecessors: B12

Route
- Locale: Prince George's County, Maryland
- Communities served: Capitol Heights, Coral Hills, Walker Mill, District Heights, Suitland
- Start: Addison Road station
- Via: Central Avenue, Shady Glen Drive, Walker Mill Road, Shadyside Avenue, Marlboro Pike
- End: Suitland station
- Length: 35-40 minutes

Service
- Level: Daily
- Frequency: 30 minutes (Weekday Peak-Hours); 40 minutes (All other times on Weekdays); 60 minutes (Weekends)
- Operates: 4:35 AM - 12:25 AM (Weekdays); 5:30 AM - 9:45 PM (Weekends)
- Ridership: 449,106 (FY 2024)
- Transfers: SmarTrip only
- Timetable: District Heights–Suitland Line

The District Heights–Suitland Line, designated Route V12, was a daily bus route operated by the Washington Metropolitan Area Transit Authority between the Addison Road station of the Blue & Silver Lines of the Washington Metro and Suitland station of the Green Line of the Washington Metro. The line operated every 30–40 minutes on weekdays and 60 minutes on weekends. V12 trips were roughly 35 minutes long.

== Background ==
Route V12 operated daily between Addison Road station and Suitland station connecting Capitol Heights, Coral Hills, Walker Mill, District Heights, Suitland neighborhoods to both stations, supplementing Route P12. Route V12 operated out of Landover division.

== History ==
Route V12 was created as a brand new Metrobus route by WMATA on December 3, 1978 to replace the former B12 Metrobus route that was discontinued. Unlike the B12 which operated between Federal Triangle in Downtown Washington D.C. (11th Street NW and E Street NW) & the Penn Mar Shopping Center, V12 would operate as part of the Pennsylvania Avenue-Maryland Line, between the newly opened Potomac Avenue station & Penn Mar Shopping Center, via Potomac Avenue, Pennsylvania Avenue, and Donnell Drive. The B12 former routing between the intersection of Potomac Avenue SE & Pennsylvania Avenue SE and Federal Triangle was replaced by the Pennsylvania Avenue Line (routes 32, 34, and 36).

On January 4, 1981 two months after Addison Road station opened, route V12 was truncated to only operate between Potomac Avenue and Addison Road stations. The segment along Pennsylvania Avenue between Silver Hill Road and Penn Mar Shopping Center was replaced by the existing K12 and K19, and new routes V14, and V15. Route V11 was also discontinued on the same day. As a result of the change in V12's routing, V12 was renamed the Addison Road-Potomac Avenue Line.

New routes V14 and V15 would operate along the former V12 routing between Addison Road station and Penn Mar Shopping Center via the Coral Hills, District Heights, and Forestville neighborhoods, while also operating through Capitol Heights.

On January 13, 2001 when Suitland station opened, the V12's routing was truncated even further to only operate between the Addison Road and Suitland stations. V12's routing between Addison Road and Potomac Avenue stations, was replaced by a new route V11 which would only operate on early Saturday morning trips prior to Metro's opening. As a result of these route changes, the Addison Road–Potomac Avenue Line, was renamed the District Heights–Suitland Line.

On June 24, 2007, route V11 was discontinued as both the Blue & Orange Line trains began operating during the earlier times on Saturday mornings.

In 2014, it was proposed for the P12 and V12 to swap routings between Addison Road station and the intersection of Addison Road and Walker Mill Road which will provide a more direct route for the P12 as the V12 is focused to become a neighborhood focused route. This was because swapping P12 and V12 routing on Wheeler Road and Shady Glen Drive will provide a more direct route for the P12 as the V12 is already designed to be a more neighborhood-focused service.

On June 21, 2015, as part of Metro's Better Bus Service initiative, routes P12 and V12 swapped their routing between the intersection of Addison Road and Walker Mill Road and Addison Road station. Route P12 would operate along Addison Road, while Route V12 would operate along Shady Glen Drive, Walker Mill Road, and Central Avenue. Route P12 became a more direct route while allowing Route V12 to be a neighborhood-focused route.

During the COVID-19 pandemic, the line was reduced to operate on its Saturday supplemental schedule beginning on March 16, 2020. Beginning on March 18, 2020, the line was further reduced to operate on its Sunday schedule. Weekend service was also suspended beginning on March 21, 2020. The line its full schedule between Monday through Saturday beginning on August 23, 2020, but Sunday service remained suspended.

On September 26, 2020, WMATA proposed to eliminate all Route V12 Sunday service due to low federal funding. Route V12 has not operated on Sundays since March 15, 2020 due to Metro's response to the COVID-19 pandemic. However on March 14, 2021, route V12 Sunday service was restored.

In 2024 during WMATA's FY2024 Budget crisis, WMATA proposed to eliminate all V12 weekend service. However on April 25, 2024, Metro’s Board of Directors approved a $4.8 billion capital and operating budget which avoided service cuts.

=== Better Bus Redesign ===
In 2022, WMATA launched its Better Bus Redesign project, which aimed to redesign the entire Metrobus Network and is the first full redesign of the agency's bus network in its history.

In April 2023, WMATA launched its Draft Visionary Network. As part of the drafts, WMATA proposed to split the V12 into two routes.

The portion between Suitland station and the intersection of Marlboro Pike & County Road via Silver Hill Road, Shadyside Avenue, Pennsylvania Avenue, Brooks Drive, and Marlboro Pike remained the same, but the route was extended further down to Penn Mar Shopping Center via Marlboro Pike, and was named Route MD366 in the drafts.

The portion between the intersection of Central Avenue & Shady Glen Drive and the intersection of Rochell Avenue & Atwood Street was combined with Route F14 and was named Route MD257. The route would operate between New Carrollton station and Branch Avenue station via the current F14 routing between New Carrollton station and FedEx Field, then via Garrett A. Morgan Boulevard, Morgan Boulevard station, Central Avenue, Shady Glen Drive, Walker Mill Road, Marlboro Pike, Forestville Road, Allentown Road, and Auth Road. Service along Gateway Drive was eliminated, and service to Addison Road station was taken over by Route MD258.

During WMATA's Revised Draft Visionary Network, WMATA renamed the MD257 to Route P61 and was to operate between New Carrollton station and Suitland station. The route would follow the current F14 routing between New Carrollton station and FedEx Field, with service along Johnson Street and Hayes Street being restored, then would operate on the proposed route MD257 routing to the intersection of Central Avenue & Shady Glen Drive via Garrett A. Morgan Boulevard and Morgan Boulevard station. There, the route would be combined with the current Route V12 and would operate to Suitland station via Shady Glen Drive, Walker Mill Road, Rochell Avenue, Council Drive, Gateway Boulevard, Marlboro Pike, Brooks Drive, Pennsylvania Avenue, Shadyside Avenue, Suitland Road, and Silver Hill Road. Route MD366 was dropped from the proposal in favor of Route C37, P61, P62, P64, P65, P66, and P67. All changes were then proposed during WMATA's 2025 Proposed Network.

On November 21, 2024, WMATA approved its Better Bus Redesign Network.

Beginning on June 29, 2025, Route V12 was merged with the F14 and renamed to Route P61. The line remained the same between Suitland station and the intersection of Central Avenue & Shady Glen Drive, but the route no longer serves Addison Road station and instead operates to Garrett A. Morgan Boulevard, Morgan Boulevard station, and Northwest Stadium before following the F14 routing to New Carrollton station.
