= Branch Avenue =

Branch Avenue may refer to:

- Branch Avenue station, in Suitland, Maryland, United States
- Branch Avenue, part of Maryland Route 5 and its continuation into Washington, DC, United States
