= J12 =

J12 may refer to:

== Vehicles ==
=== Aircraft ===
- Nanchang J-12, a prototype Chinese fighter

=== Automobiles ===
- Hispano-Suiza J12, a French luxury car
- Subaru J12, a Japanese hatchback

=== Ships ===
- HSwMS Sundsvall (J12), a Visby-class destroyer of the Swedish Navy

== Other uses ==
- Chanel J12, a Swiss-made watch
- County Route J12 (California)
- Triangular bipyramid, a Johnson solid (J_{12})
- Marlboro Pike Line, a bus route in the Washington Metro Area
- Viral pneumonia
