= Cedar Heights =

Cedar Heights may refer to:

- Cedar Heights, Maryland
- Cedar Heights, New Jersey
