= Forestville-Suitland Line =

P66
- Forestville-Suitland Line

Overview
- System: Metrobus
- Operator: Washington Metropolitan Area Transit Authority
- Garage: Andrews Federal Center
- Livery: Local
- Status: Active
- Began service: 1963
- Ended service: K11, K13: June 26, 2016; K19: January 13, 2001; K12: June 29, 2025
- Predecessors: J12, K12

Route
- Locale: Prince George's County
- Communities served: Suitland, District Heights, Forestville
- Landmarks served: The Centre at Forestville, Penn Mar Shopping Center, Park Berkshire, Surrey Square, Suitland station
- Start: Forestville (8411 Old Marlboro Pike)
- Via: Silver Hill Road, Surrey Service Drive, Hil-Mar Drive, Pennsylvania Avenue, Donnell Drive, Marlboro Pike, Forestville Road
- End: Suitland station

Service
- Level: Daily
- Frequency: 30 minutes
- Operates: 4:45 AM - 12:01 AM (Weekdays); 6:15 AM - 11:20 PM (Saturday); 6:06 AM - 10:10 PM (Sunday)
- Ridership: 667,658 (FY 2024)
- Transfers: SmarTrip only
- Timetable: Forestville-Suitland Line

The Forestville-Suitland Line, designated as Route P66, is a daily bus route operated by the Washington Metropolitan Area Transit Authority between Suitland station of the Green Line of the Washington Metro and Forestville (8411 Old Marlboro Pike).

== Background ==
Route P66 operates between Suitland station and Forestville via Penn Mar Shopping Center. Route P66 operates out of Andrews Federal Center division.

=== Former K12 Stops ===
Bus stop	Direction	Connections
Prince George's County, Maryland
Branch Avenue station Bus Bay H	Northbound stop, Southbound terminal	Metrobus: C11, C12, C13, C14; TheBus: 30; Washington Metro:
Old Soper Road / Auth Way	Southbound	Metrobus: C12, C13, C14; TheBus: 30
Old Soper Road / Auth Road	Northbound	Metrobus: C12, C13, C14; TheBus: 30
Auth Road / Gloria Drive	Southbound	TheBus: 30
Auth Road / Henderson Way	Northbound	TheBus: 30
Auth Road / Procopio Drive	Southbound	TheBus: 30
Auth Road / Oakland Way	Northbound	TheBus: 30
Auth Road / Dublin Drive	Bidirectional	TheBus: 30
Auth Road / Clacton Avenue	Northbound	TheBus: 30
Auth Road / Braymer Avenue	Southbound	TheBus: 30
Auth Road / Carswell Avenue	Bidirectional	TheBus: 30
Auth Road / Magruder Avenue	Bidirectional	TheBus: 30
Maxwell Drive / Morris Avenue	Southbound	TheBus: 30
Allentown Road / Maxwell Drive	Southbound	Metrobus: D14; TheBus: 30
Allentown Road / Command Drive Joint Base Andrews (West Gate)	Bidirectional	Metrobus: D14
Allentown Road / Andrews Manor Shopping Center	Bidirectional	Metrobus: D14
Allentown Road / Joint Base Andrews (Main Gate)	Northbound	Metrobus: D14
Allentown Road / Suitland Road	Southbound	Metrobus: D14
Forestville Road / Rena Road	Bidirectional	
Forestville Road / #4111	Southbound	Metrobus: J12 (Westbound only)
Forestville Road / #4200	Northbound	Metrobus: J12 (Westbound only)
Forestville Road / Suit Road	Northbound	Metrobus: J12 (Westbound only)
Forestville Road / Penn Belt Drive	Southbound	Metrobus: J12 (Westbound only)
Forestville Road / Stewart Road	Bidirectional	Metrobus: J12 (Westbound only)
Marlboro Pike / Pumphrey Drive	Bidirectional	Metrobus: J12; TheBus: 24
Marlboro Pike / Ritchie Road	Northbound	Metrobus: J12
Marlboro Pike / Newkirk Avenue	Southbound	Metrobus: J12
Marlboro Pike / Kirtland Avenue	Northbound	Metrobus: J12
Marlboro Pike / Lakehurst Avenue	Southbound	Metrobus: J12
Marlboro Pike / Boones Lane	Bidirectional	Metrobus: J12, V14
Marlboro Pike / Lorring Drive	Bidirectional	Metrobus: J12, V14
Donnell Drive / Marlboro Pike	Bidirectional	Metrobus: J12; TheBus: 20
Donnell Drive / Penn Mar Shopping Center	Southbound	Metrobus: V14 (Southbound only); TheBus: 20
Donnell Drive / The Centre at Forestville	Northbound	Metrobus: V14 (Southbound only); TheBus: 20
Donnell Drive / Pennsylvania Avenue	Bidirectional	TheBus: 20
Walters Lane / Chavez Lane	Bidirectional	
Hil Mar Drive / Rental Office	Northbound	
Hil Mar Drive / Regency Village Apartments	Southbound	
Hil Mar Drive / #6505	Bidirectional	
Hil Mar Drive / #6303	Bidirectional	
Hil Mar Drive / North Hil Mar Circle	Bidirectional	
Hil Mar Drive / South Hil Mar Circle	Southbound	
Hil Mar Drive / Dynasty Drive	Northbound	
Surrey Square Lane / Regency Parkway	Bidirectional	
Surrey Square Lane / Berkshire Elementary School	Northbound	
Avenue Apartments Roadway / Surrey Service Lane	Southbound	
Avenue Apartments Roadway / Surrey Service Drive	Northbound	
Surrey Service Drive / Park Berkshire Apartments	Southbound	
Surrey Service Drive / Surrey Square Apartments	Bidirectional	
Surrey Service Drive / Regency Parkway	Bidirectional	
Surrey Service Drive / Parkland Drive	Bidirectional	
Pennsylvania Avenue / Parkland Drive	Bidirectional	
Silver Hill Road / West Avenue	Bidirectional	Metrobus: P12
Silver Hill Road / Plaza Drive	Southbound	Metrobus: P12
Silver Hill Road / Silver Hill Court	Northbound	Metrobus: P12
Silver Hill Road / Royal Plaza Drive	Bidirectional	Metrobus: P12
Silver Hill Road / Sunset Lane	Southbound	Metrobus: P12
Silver Hill Road / Brooks Drive	Northbound	Metrobus: P12
Silver Hill Road / Porter Avenue	Bidirectional	Metrobus: P12
Silver Hill Road / Suitland Road	Bidirectional	Metrobus: D14, P12, V12; TheBus: 34
Silver Hill Road / Swann Road	Bidirectional	Metrobus: D14, P12, V12; TheBus: 34
Silver Hill Road / Randall Road	Bidirectional	Metrobus: D14, P12, V12; TheBus: 34
Suitland Station Roadway / Suitland Federal Center	Northbound	Metrobus: D12, D14, P12, V12; TheBus: 34; MTA Maryland Bus: 735, 850
Silver Hill Road / Parkway Terrace Drive	Southbound	Metrobus: D14, P12, V12; TheBus: 34
Suitland station Bus Bay K	Southbound stop, Northbound terminal	Metrobus: D12, D14, P12, V12; TheBus: 34; MTA Maryland Bus: 735, 850; Washington Metro:

== History ==
Routes K12 & K19 were initially created as new bus routes in 1963, to operate between Federal Triangle in Downtown Washington D.C. & Andrews Air Force Base Gates in Camp Springs, MD, via 11th Street NW, E Street NW, 10th Street NW, Pennsylvania Avenue NW, 7th Street SW, Independence Avenue SW/SE, Pennsylvania Avenue SE, Pennsylvania Avenue, Shadyside Avenue, Suitland Road, Silver Hill Road, Pennsylvania Avenue, Parkland Drive, Surrey Service Drive, the Park Berkshire Apartment Complex, Hil Mar Drive, Walters Lane, Forestville Road, and Allentown Road. Both routes eventually became WMATA Metrobus Routes on February 4, 1973 when WMATA acquired all four private bus companies that were operating throughout the Washington D.C. Metropolitan Area and merged them all together to form its own, "Metrobus" System.

Both routes were rerouted to serve Potomac Avenue & Eastern Market stations in the middle of their routes on July 15, 1977.

On September 25, 1978, both routes K12 & K19 were truncated to Potomac Avenue station only eliminating service to Downtown DC.

On January 13, 2001 when the Green Line was extended to Branch Avenue and both the Suitland and Branch Avenue stations opened, route K19 was eliminated K12 was truncated even further, to only operate between Suitland and Branch Avenue stations, via Andrews Air Force Base.

A new route K11 replaced the segment of the former route K12 & K19's routing between Potomac Avenue Metro Station and the intersection of Suitland Road & Silver Hill Road operating parallel to route K12. Unlike route K12, route K11 would not serve Suitland station and operated during times the Green Line is not operating. Another new route, the K13 was also introduced to operate on select rush hour trips between Suitland Metro Station & Penn Mar Shopping Center.

Due to the planned closure by the management of the Park Berkshire Apartments roadway that connects with Hil-Mar Drive on June 27, 2004, routes K11, K12 & K13 were rerouted to operate to Suitland station, via their regular routing between the intersection of Walters Lane & Pennsylvania Avenue and intersection Hil Mar Drive & Park Berkshire roadway. All K11 & K12 trips to the Branch Avenue station as well as the K13 routes were also rerouted to follow the exact same routing, except in the exact opposite direction.

On June 26, 2016, route K11 was discontinued and replaced by K12. This and the J11 were the last one morning trips that operate prior to Metro opening heading to Potomac Avenue station.

On June 24, 2018, route K13 was discontinued and replaced by Route K12. Route K13 shortened trips between Suitland Metro Station & Penn Mar Shopping Center, were replaced by rush hour K12 trips as of a result. Route K12 was also rerouted to operate via Donnell Drive, Marlboro Pike, and Forestville Road between Pennsylvania Avenue & Donnell Drive and Pennsylvania Avenue & Forestville Road but no longer stop on Command Drive at Allentown Road (Joint Base Andrews West Gate).

During the COVID-19 pandemic, the line was reduced to operate on its Saturday supplemental schedule beginning on March 16, 2020. Beginning on March 18, 2020, the line was further reduced to operate on its Sunday schedule. Weekend service was also suspended beginning on March 21, 2020. The line restored its full schedule beginning on August 23, 2020.

=== Better Bus Redesign ===
In 2022, WMATA launched its Better Bus Redesign project, which aimed to redesign the entire Metrobus Network and is the first full redesign of the agency's bus network in its history.

In April 2023, WMATA launched its Draft Visionary Network. As part of the drafts, WMATA proposed to split the K12 into two routes. The K12 portion between Suitland station and the intersection of Forestville Road & Pennsylvania Avenue via Silver Hill Road, Pennsylvania Avenue, Surrey Service Drive, Surrey Square Lane, Regency Parkway, Hil-Mar Drive, Pennsylvania Avenue, Donnell Drive, and Marlboro Pike remained the same, but the route would be extended to Presidential Parkway/Machinists Building via Pennsylvania Avenue as Route MD261. The K12 portion between the intersection of Forestville Road & Pennsylvania Avenue and Branch Avenue station via Forestville Road, Allentown Road, and Auth Road would be combined with the F14 and was named Route MD257 and would closely operate along the current F14 routing between New Carrollton station and Northwest Stadium, then the route would be extended to Branch Avenue station via Garrett A. Morgan Boulevard, Morgan Boulevard station, Central Avenue, Shady Glen Drive, Walker Mill Road, Marlboro Pike, and the K12 routing via Forestville Road, Allentown Road, and Auth Road.

During the proposals, Route MD257 was renamed to Route P61 and would be modified to serve Suitland station, combining the F14 and V12 routes. Route MD261 was renamed to Route P66 and had the routing modified to follow the proposed MD261 and current K12 routing between Suitland station and the intersection of Forestville Road & Pennsylvania Avenue, but would follow the J12 loop around Forestville via Pennsylvania Avenue, Old Marlboro Pike, Suitland Parkway, and Forestville Road. Service between the intersection of Forestville Road & Pennsylvania Avenue and Branch Avenue station was combined with the V14 as Route P62 and operated between Penn Mar Shopping Center and New Carrollton station. All changes were then proposed during WMATA's 2025 Proposed Network.

On November 21, 2024, WMATA approved its Better Bus Redesign Network.

Beginning on June 29, 2025, Route K12 was split into two routes. The portion between Branch Avenue station and Penn Mar Shopping Center was modified and combined with the V14, operating its full route to Deanwood station and renamed into the P62. The portion between Suitland station and Penn Mar Shopping Center was combined with the J12, operating to Forestville (8431 Old Marlboro Pike), and renamed into the P66.
