= The Centre at Forestville =

- Location: 3393 Donnell Dr., Forestville, Maryland, United States
- Coordinates: 38°50′51″N 76°53′13″W
- Opened: 1979
- Developer: Melvin Simon & Associates
- Manager: Petrie Richardson
- Num. of stores: 70
- Num. of anchor tenants: 2
- Floor area: 463,461 square feet (43,056.9 m^{2})
- Floors: 1
- Public transit: GoPGC: P64, P65, P76; Metrobus: P62, P66

The Centre at Forestville is an enclosed shopping mall located in Forestville, Maryland. It is anchored by JCPenney and Target.

== History ==
The mall opened 1979 as Forest Village Park Mall, anchored by JCPenney and Kmart and developed by Melvin Simon & Associates. The Kmart store closed in 2002. In 2003, Petrie Ross Ventures purchased the mall from Simon Property Group for $20.3 million. Petrie Ross tore down the vacant Kmart store and constructed a new Target store, remodeled the mall's interior, and renamed the mall as The Centre at Forestville.

On July 31, 2020, JCPenney announced they would be selling their surplus stores with 21 stores including Forestville. As of March 2022, this location is still open.
