= Cedar Heights, Maryland =

Cedar Heights
- Census-designated place
- Location within the state of Maryland Cedar Heights (the United States)
- Coordinates: 38°54′9″N 76°54′29″W
- Country: United States of America
- State: Maryland
- County: Prince George's

Area
  - Total: 0.22 sq mi (0.56 km^{2})
  - Land: 0.22 sq mi (0.56 km^{2})
  - Water: 0 sq mi (0.00 km^{2})

Population (2020)
  - Total: 1,597
  - Density: 7,393.8/sq mi (2,854.76/km^{2})
- Time zone: UTC-5 (Eastern (EST))
  - Summer (DST): UTC-4 (EDT)
- FIPS code: 24-14550
- GNIS feature ID: 597202

Cedar Heights is a census designated place in Prince George's County, Maryland, United States. Per the 2020 Census, the population was 1,597.

== Demographics ==
Historical population
Census	Pop.	Note	%±
2020	1,597		—
U.S. Decennial Census; 2020

Cedar Heights first appeared as a census designated place in the 2020 U.S. census.

=== Racial and ethnic composition ===
Cedar Heights CDP, Maryland – Racial and ethnic composition Note: the US Census treats Hispanic/Latino as an ethnic category. This table excludes Latinos from the racial categories and assigns them to a separate category. Hispanics/Latinos may be of any race.
Race / Ethnicity (NH = Non-Hispanic)	Pop 2020	% 2020
White alone (NH)	17	1.06%
Black or African American alone (NH)	1,310	82.03%
Native American or Alaska Native alone (NH)	1	0.06%
Asian alone (NH)	12	0.75%
Native Hawaiian or Pacific Islander alone (NH)	0	0.00%
Other race alone (NH)	5	0.31%
Mixed race or Multiracial (NH)	21	1.31%
Hispanic or Latino (any race)	231	14.46%
Total	1,597	100.00%

=== 2020 census ===
As of the 2020 census, Cedar Heights had a population of 1,597. The median age was 36.8 years. 24.4% of residents were under the age of 18 and 14.3% of residents were 65 years of age or older. For every 100 females there were 94.8 males, and for every 100 females age 18 and over there were 90.7 males age 18 and over.

100.0% of residents lived in urban areas, while 0.0% lived in rural areas.

There were 553 households in Cedar Heights, of which 33.1% had children under the age of 18 living in them. Of all households, 31.6% were married-couple households, 23.5% were households with a male householder and no spouse or partner present, and 39.8% were households with a female householder and no spouse or partner present. About 27.6% of all households were made up of individuals and 9.8% had someone living alone who was 65 years of age or older.

There were 579 housing units, of which 4.5% were vacant. The homeowner vacancy rate was 3.2% and the rental vacancy rate was 2.7%.

== Notable people ==
- Earl P. Williams Jr., U.S. flag historian (paleovexillologist) who discovered that U.S. Founding Father Francis Hopkinson designed a flag for the United States and a flag for the U.S. Navy, which became the prototype for the Stars and Stripes flag.

== See also ==
- Chapel Oaks-Cedar Heights, a single census area recorded during the 1970 Census.
