= Downtown Largo station =

Washington Metro station

Downtown Largo
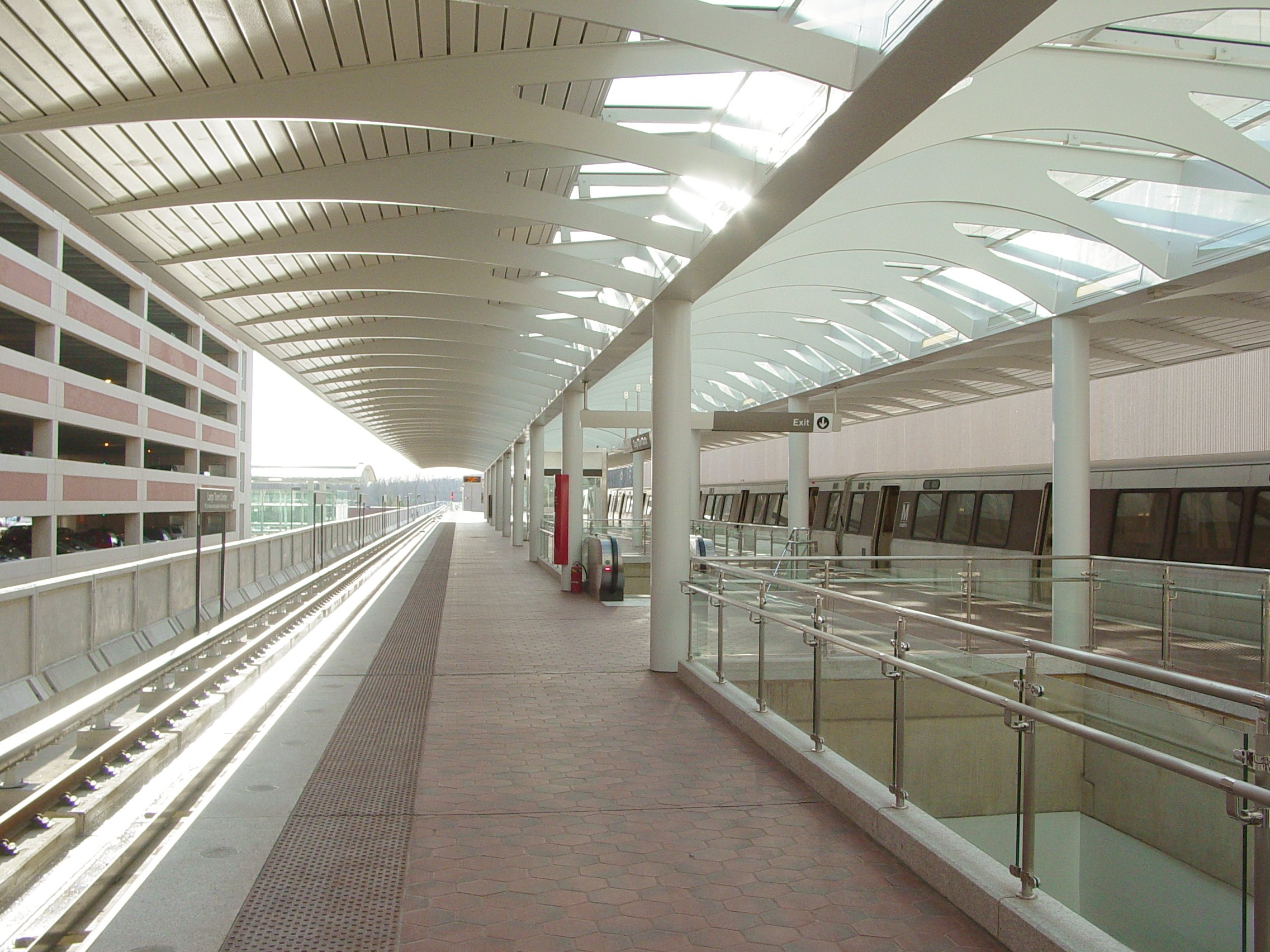
- Station platform in June 2005, a few months after opening.

General information
- Location: 9000 Lottsford Road; Largo, Maryland
- Coordinates: 38°54′2.1″N 76°50′40.3″W
- Owner: Washington Metropolitan Area Transit Authority
- Platforms: 1 island platform
- Tracks: 2
- Connections: Metrobus: P41, P63, P72, P73; GoPGC: P44, P52, P56, P57, P5X, P64

Construction
- Structure type: Elevated
- Parking: 2,200 spaces
- Cycle facilities: Capital Bikeshare, 4 racks
- Accessible: Yes

Other information
- Station code: G05

History
- Opened: December 18, 2004; 21 years ago
- Former names: Largo Town Center (2004–2022)

Passengers
- 2025: 3,127 (average weekday)
- Rank: 57 of 98

Services
Preceding station	Washington Metro	Following station
Morgan Boulevard toward Ashburn	Silver Line	Terminus
Morgan Boulevard toward Franconia–Springfield	Blue Line	Terminus
Former services
Preceding station	Washington Metro	Following station
Morgan Boulevard toward Vienna	Orange Line	Terminus
Route map
Location

Downtown Largo station is an island-platformed Washington Metro station in Lake Arbor, Prince George's County, Maryland, United States, with a Largo postal address.

The station opened on December 18, 2004, as Largo Town Center and is operated by the Washington Metropolitan Area Transit Authority (WMATA). It is the eastern terminus of the Blue and half of Silver Line trains, and serves the town of Largo and the former The Boulevard at the Capital Centre.

It is the first and so far only station in Prince George's County outside the Capital Beltway, and is located about 1 mile (1.6 km) from Northwest Stadium, the home of the Washington Commanders. It is also a major commuter station, with two parking garages, containing a total of 2,200 spaces, connected by a bridge at the top level.

== Station layout ==
Tail tracks with provisions for a route extension at the east end of the station.

The station consists of an elevated island platform station, similar in architecture to Morgan Boulevard, one stop to the west. Track G1 is the nominal eastbound track, while G2 is the nominal westbound track. Since the station is the terminus of the G route, trains approach to whichever platform track is unused and switch onto the westbound track after departure. The station itself is flanked on both sides by a six-story parking structure, with the garage to the southeast being roughly double the size of the one to the northwest. Past the station to the northeast, tracks dip underground to connect to a 3-track train storage facility located underneath a WMATA building. Provisions exist on the elevated trackage just beyond the station to the northeast, before the tracks enter the tunnel portal, for a further elevated extension if one was ever to be built. No tracks or switches are installed, only the concrete structure for a flying junction exists. A crossover is installed just past the platform to the southwest of the station.

== History ==
In 1980, Herbert Harris and other local legislators introduced legislation to study the feasibility of constructing an additional 47 miles (76 km) to the original 103-mile (166 km) network. Included in this request was a previously considered 13-mile (21 km) extension of the Blue Line through Largo en route to a proposed terminus at Bowie.

In October 1996, the proposed routing for the extension of the Blue Line to Largo received a favorable environmental impact statement thus allowing for the project to move forward. The plan represented the first expansion to the original 103-mile (166 km) Metro network and would include both the then named Summerfield and Largo stations. The station gained approval from Congress as part of the extension in February 2000 with the federal government contributing $259 million towards its construction.

Construction began in 2001, and the station opened as Largo Town Center on December 18, 2004 within 4 weeks after the opening of the system's first infill station, NoMa-Gallaudet University, between Union and Rhode Island Avenue-Brentwood stations. Its opening coincided with the completion of 3.2 miles (5.1 km) of rail east of the Addison Road station and the opening of the Morgan Boulevard station. The final cost of building it, its sister station and rail extension was $456 million.

In December 2012, the station was one of five added to the route of the Silver Line, which was originally supposed to end at the Stadium–Armory station but was extended into Prince George's County, Maryland to Largo due to safety concerns about a pocket track just past Stadium–Armory. Therefore, the station is also the eastern terminus of the Silver Line, which began service on July 26, 2014.

On January 13, 2022, WMATA's Safety and Operations Committee recommended the name of the station be changed to Downtown Largo after conducting a brief public opinion survey, despite the survey saying participants did not like the term "Downtown". The new name became effective on September 11, 2022.
