= Chapel Oaks-Cedar Heights, Maryland =

Chapel Oaks-Cedar Heights
- Former CDP
- Location within the state of Maryland Chapel Oaks-Cedar Heights (the United States)
- Coordinates: 38°54′22″N 76°54′40″W
- Country: United States
- State: Maryland
- Counties: Prince George's

Area
  - Land: 1.0 sq mi (2.6 km^{2})

Population (1970)
  - Total: 6,049
  - Density: 6,000/sq mi (2,300/km^{2})
- Time zone: UTC−5 (Eastern (EST))
  - Summer (DST): UTC−4 (EDT)
- ZIP code: 20743
- Area code(s): 301 & 240
- FIPS code: 24-15225

Chapel Oaks-Cedar Heights was a census-designated place in Prince George's County, Maryland during the 1970 United States census. It consisted of the communities of Chapel Oaks and Cedar Heights. The population in 1970 was 6,049. The census area dissolved in 1980 and has not been reorganized since. The ZIP code serving the area is 20743.

== Geography ==
Located at 38.906236 north and 76.911198 west, the census area of Chapel Oaks-Cedar Heights was bordered by Cheverly to the northeast, Kentland to the east, Seat Pleasant to the south and Fairmount Heights to the southwest. The land area of the CDP was 1 square mile and a population density of 6,049 persons per sq. mi.
