= Addison Road station =

Washington Metro station

Addison Road Seat Pleasant
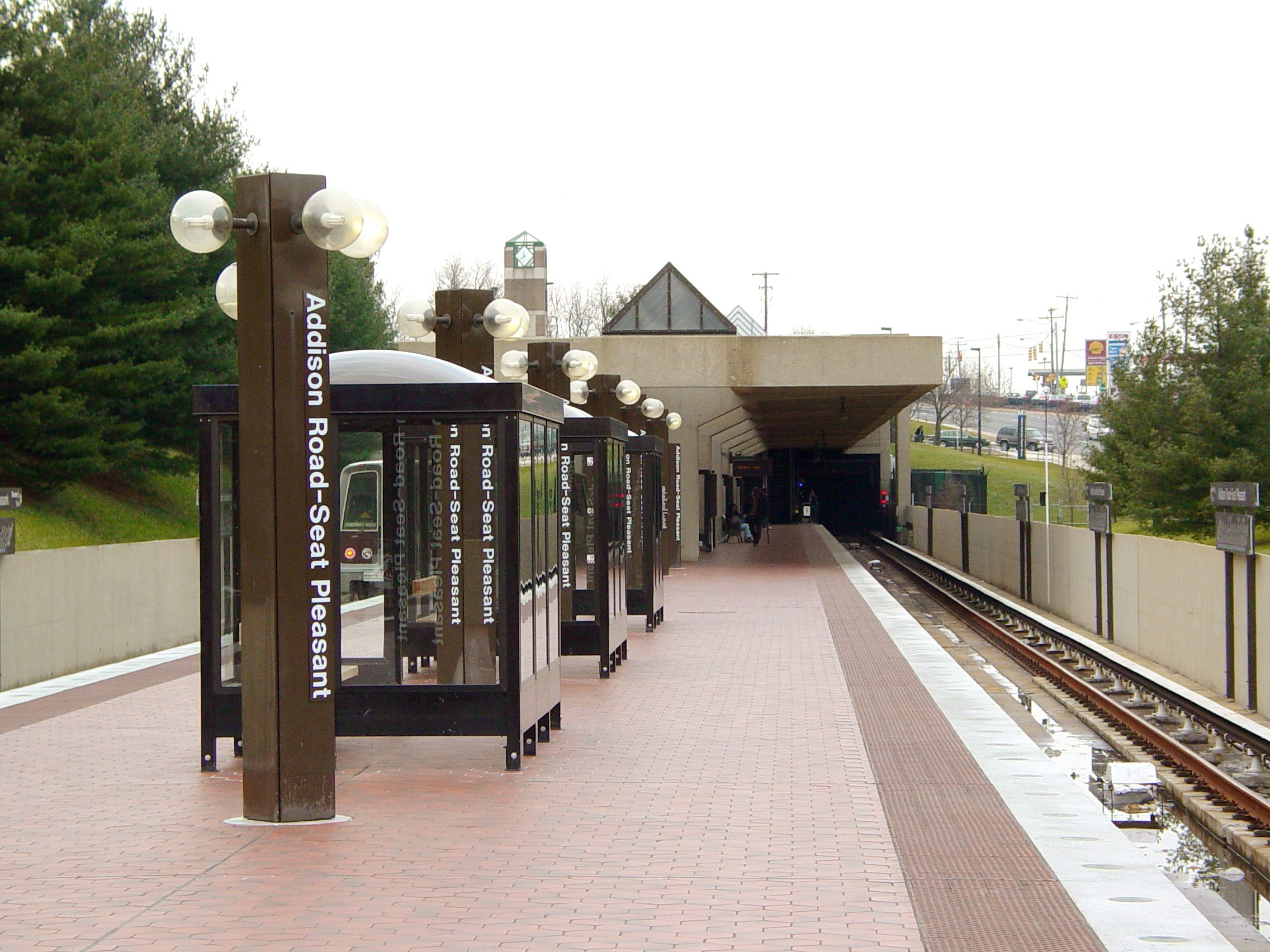

General information
- Location: 100 Addison Rd S Capitol Heights, Maryland
- Coordinates: 38°53′12.2″N 76°53′39.4″W
- Owner: WMATA
- Platforms: 1 island platform
- Tracks: 2
- Connections: Metrobus: P60, P62, P63; GoPGC: P43, P54, P56, P76

Construction
- Structure type: At grade
- Parking: 1,268 spaces
- Cycle facilities: Capital Bikeshare, 16 racks
- Accessible: Yes

Other information
- Station code: G03

History
- Opened: November 22, 1980; 45 years ago
- Former names: Addison Road—Seat Pleasant (2000–2011)

Passengers
- 2025: 1,759 (average weekday)
- Rank: 82 of 98

Services
Preceding station	Washington Metro	Following station
Capitol Heights toward Ashburn	Silver Line	Morgan Boulevard toward Downtown Largo
Capitol Heights toward Franconia–Springfield	Blue Line	Morgan Boulevard toward Downtown Largo
Former services
Preceding station	Washington Metro	Following station
Capitol Heights toward Vienna	Orange Line	Morgan Boulevard toward Downtown Largo
Route map
Location

Addison Road station is a rapid transit station on the Washington Metro's Silver and Blue Lines. It is operated by the Washington Metropolitan Area Transit Authority, who opened it in 1980. It was the eastern end of the Blue Line until 2004. The station is in Seat Pleasant on Central Avenue, although its official address puts it in Capitol Heights.

== History ==
The station, which has a single central platform, opened on November 22, 1980, and coincided with the completion of 3.52 miles (5.66 km) of rail east of the Stadium–Armory station and the opening of the Benning Road and Capitol Heights stations. The station features escalators with the elevator between them as seen at North Bethesda and Union Station between the mezzanine and platform. The station was originally named "Addison Road"; the name "Seat Pleasant" was added in 2000 and moved to a new subtitle location in 2011. It was the eastern terminus of the Blue Line from its opening until December 18, 2004, when the extension to the Largo Town Center (now known as Downtown Largo) station opened to the east. In the early eighties, due to peculiarities of the system at the time, trains travelling toward Addison Road showed blue rollsigns, but switched to orange signs before departing westward, back into the city.

In December 2003, security cameras at this station filmed a deer walking around the station mezzanine, running down an escalator, and going down the platform past a waiting train, as startled passengers watched. The deer then jumped onto the tracks and escaped into nearby woods. Metro spokesperson Lisa Farbstein reported that Metro had nicknamed the deer "Rudolph the Blue Line Reindeer".

In December 2012, Addison Road was one of five stations added to the route of the Silver Line, which was originally supposed to end at the Stadium–Armory station, but was extended into Prince George's County, Maryland, to Largo (the eastern terminus of the Blue Line) due to safety concerns about a pocket track just past Stadium-Armory. Silver Line service at Addison Road began on July 26, 2014.

In May 2018, Metro announced an extensive renovation of platforms at twenty stations across the system. The platform at the Addison Road station would be rebuilt from February 13 to May 23, 2021.
