= Suitland station =

Washington Metro station

Coordinates: 38.84384°N 76.931607°W

Suitland
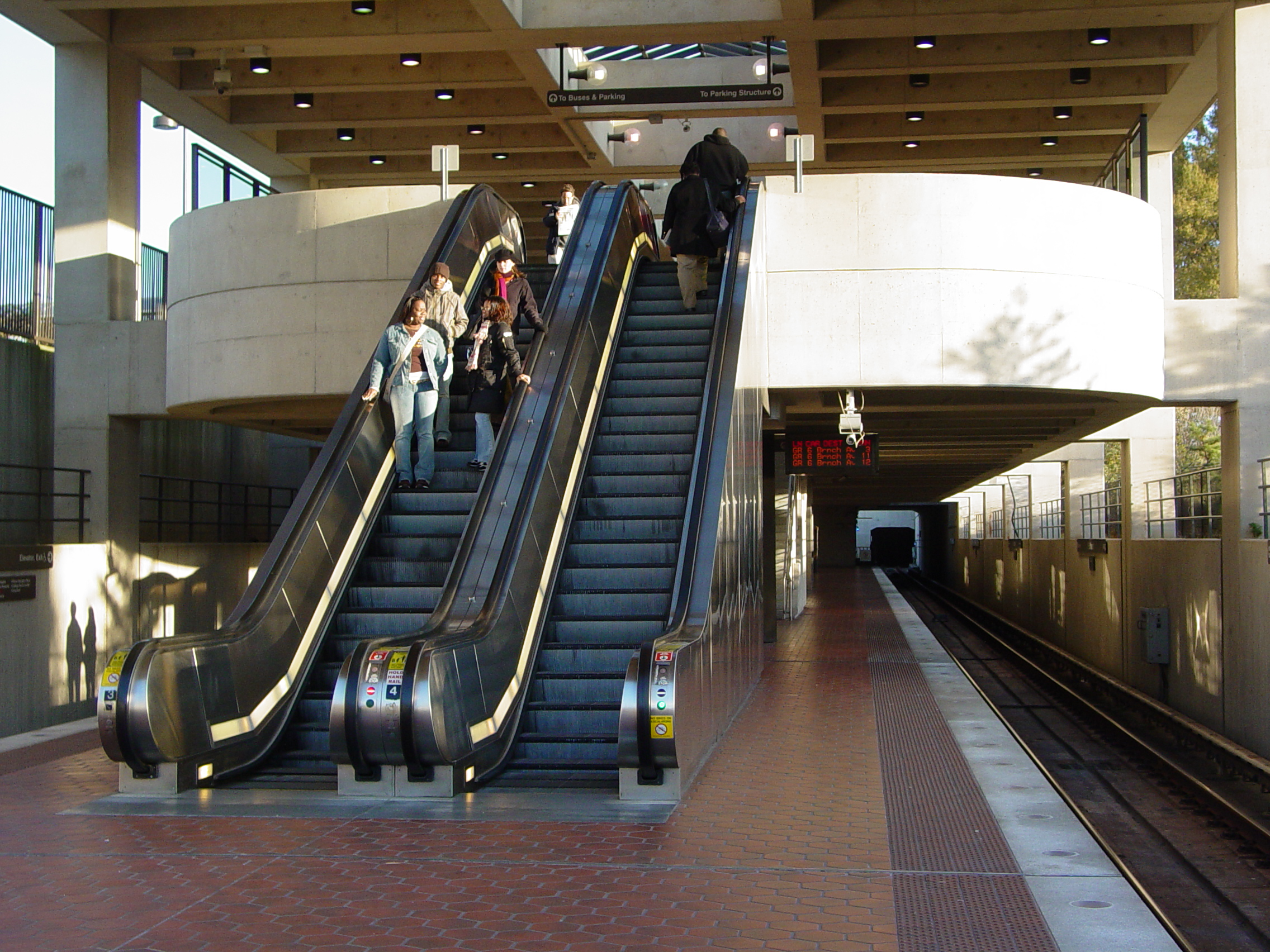
- Station platform facing south in October 2006

General information
- Location: 4500 Silver Hill Road; Suitland, Maryland
- Owner: Washington Metropolitan Area Transit Authority
- Platforms: 1 island platform
- Tracks: 2
- Connections: Metrobus: P60, P61, P66, P87, P90, P93, P94, P96; GoPGC: P64, P93; MTA Maryland Commuter Bus

Construction
- Structure type: Open cut
- Parking: 1,890 spaces
- Cycle facilities: 10 racks, 20 lockers
- Accessible: Yes

Other information
- Station code: F10

History
- Opened: January 13, 2001; 25 years ago

Passengers
- 2025: 3,163 (average weekday)
- Rank: 56 of 98

Services
Preceding station	Washington Metro	Following station
Branch Avenue Terminus	Green Line	Naylor Road toward Greenbelt
Route map
Location

Suitland station is an island platformed Washington Metro station in Suitland, Maryland, United States. The station was opened on January 13, 2001, and is operated by the Washington Metropolitan Area Transit Authority (WMATA). The station is located at Silver Hill Road and Suitland Parkway, providing service for only the Green Line.

Groundbreaking for the final segment of the Green Line occurred on September 23, 1995, and the station opened on January 13, 2001. Its opening coincided with the completion of approximately 6.5 miles (10.5 km) of rail southeast of the Anacostia station and the opening of the Branch Avenue, Congress Heights, Naylor Road and Southern Avenue stations.

== Station layout ==
The station has an island platform located in an open cut northeast of the interchange between Suitland Parkway and Silver Hill Road. A parking garage is located east of the station.

== Notable places nearby ==
- United States Census Bureau
- Washington National Records Center
