= Deanwood-Branch Avenue Line =

P62
- Deanwood-Branch Avenue Line

Overview
- System: Metrobus
- Operator: Washington Metropolitan Area Transit Authority
- Garage: Landover
- Livery: Local
- Status: Active
- Began service: January 4, 1981
- Predecessors: K12, V14, V15

Route
- Locale: Northeast, Prince George's County
- Communities served: Deanwood, Chapel Oaks, Fairmount Heights, Seat Pleasant, Carmody Hills, Pepper Mill Village, Capitol Heights, Coral Hills, Walker Mill, District Heights, Forestville, Morningside, Andrews Manor, Camp Springs
- Landmarks served: Addison Road station, Penn Mar Shopping Center, The Centre at Forestville, Joint Base Andrews
- Start: Deanwood station
- Via: Walker Mill Road, Hill Road, Seat Pleasant Drive, Central Avenue, Addison Road, Forestville Road, Allentown Road, Auth Road
- End: Branch Avenue station

Service
- Level: Daily
- Frequency: 20 minutes (Weekday peak periods); 60 minutes (All other times)
- Operates: 5:00 AM - 11:25 PM (Weekdays); 6:20 AM - 11:25 PM (Saturdays); 7:20 AM - 11:25 PM (Sundays)
- Ridership: 361,623 (FY 2024)
- Transfers: SmarTrip only
- Timetable: Deanwood-Branch Avenue Line

The Deanwood-Branch Avenue Line, designated Route P62, is a daily bus route operated by the Washington Metropolitan Area Transit Authority between Deanwood station of the Orange and Silver Lines of the Washington Metro and Branch Avenue station of the Green Line of Washington Metro. The line operates every 20 minutes during the peak periods and 60 minutes all other times. The line takes roughly 65 minutes to complete.

== Background ==
Route P62 operates daily between Deanwood station and Branch Avenue station via Addison Road station. The route provides service inside multiple neighborhoods to various Metrorail stations.

Route P62 operates out of Landover division.

== History ==
Routes V14 and V15 were created as brand new Metrobus Routes to provide alternative Metrobus service between the newly opened Addison Road station & Penn Mar Shopping Center on January 4, 1981, when the V12 was shortened to operate between Addison Road and Potomac Avenue stations only. The main difference was that the V14 and V15 would mostly operate along Addison Road, Central Avenue, Suffolk Avenue, Walker Mill Road and other various streets instead of operating straight along Pennsylvania Avenue. While V14 would be the primary Metrobus Route on the line that operate throughout most of the day, route V15 would only operate during the weekday peak-hours only.

On December 11, 1993, both the V14 and V15 were extended north from Addison Road station, to operate to Deanwood station in order to replace the R12 former routing between Deanwood and Addison Road stations, via Central Avenue, Hill Road, Seat Pleasant Drive, Addison Road, and Minnesota Avenue NE. Main differences were that the V14 would operate straight on Hill Road between the intersections of Seat Pleasant Drive and Central Avenue while the V15 would divert from the intersection of Hill Road onto the intersection of Hastings Drive, then make turn onto the intersection of Pepper Mill Drive, before returning onto Central Avenue. The routing between Addison Road and Penn Mar Shopping Center mostly remained the same other than for a small segment in the Pepper Mill Village neighborhood that was altered. As a result of these changes, the line was renamed from the District Heights Line to the District Heights–Seat Pleasant Line.

In 2015, WMATA proposed to eliminate route V15 and the segment along Pepper Mill Drive and Hastings Drive. Route V14 would add weekend service and run its full route on Sundays instead of terminating at Addison Road station.

On March 27, 2016, route V15 was discontinued and replaced by the V14 which added Saturday service. Route V14 also would operate the full route on Sundays between Deanwood station and Penn Mar Shopping Center instead of Addison Road station.

During the COVID-19 pandemic, the line was reduced to operate on its Saturday supplemental schedule beginning on March 16, 2020. Beginning on March 18, 2020, the line was further reduced to operate on its Sunday schedule. Weekend service was also suspended beginning on March 21, 2020. The line restored its full schedule beginning on August 23, 2020.

In 2024 during WMATA's FY2024 Budget crisis, WMATA proposed to eliminate all V14 service. However on April 25, 2024, Metro’s Board of Directors approved a $4.8 billion capital and operating budget which avoided service cuts.

=== Better Bus Redesign ===
In 2022, WMATA launched its Better Bus Redesign project, which aimed to redesign the entire Metrobus Network and is the first full redesign of the agency's bus network in its history.

In April 2023, WMATA launched its Draft Visionary Network. As part of the drafts, WMATA proposed to retain the V14, and it was renamed to Route MD259.

During WMATA's Revised Draft Visionary Network, WMATA renamed the MD259 to Route P62 and kept the same routing, but the route was extended from Penn Mar Shopping Center to Branch Avenue station via a modified routing of the K12 via Pennsylvania Avenue, Forestville Road, Allentown Road, and Auth Road. All changes were then proposed during WMATA's 2025 Proposed Network.

On November 21, 2024, WMATA approved its Better Bus Redesign Network.

Beginning on June 29, 2025, Route V14 remained the same, but was also combined with the K12 and was extended from Penn Mar Shopping Center to Branch Avenue station, following the former K12's routing from Penn Mar Shopping Center. The line was renamed to the P62.
