= Morgan Boulevard station =

Washington Metro station

Coordinates: 38°53′36.9″N 76°52′6.5″W

Morgan Boulevard
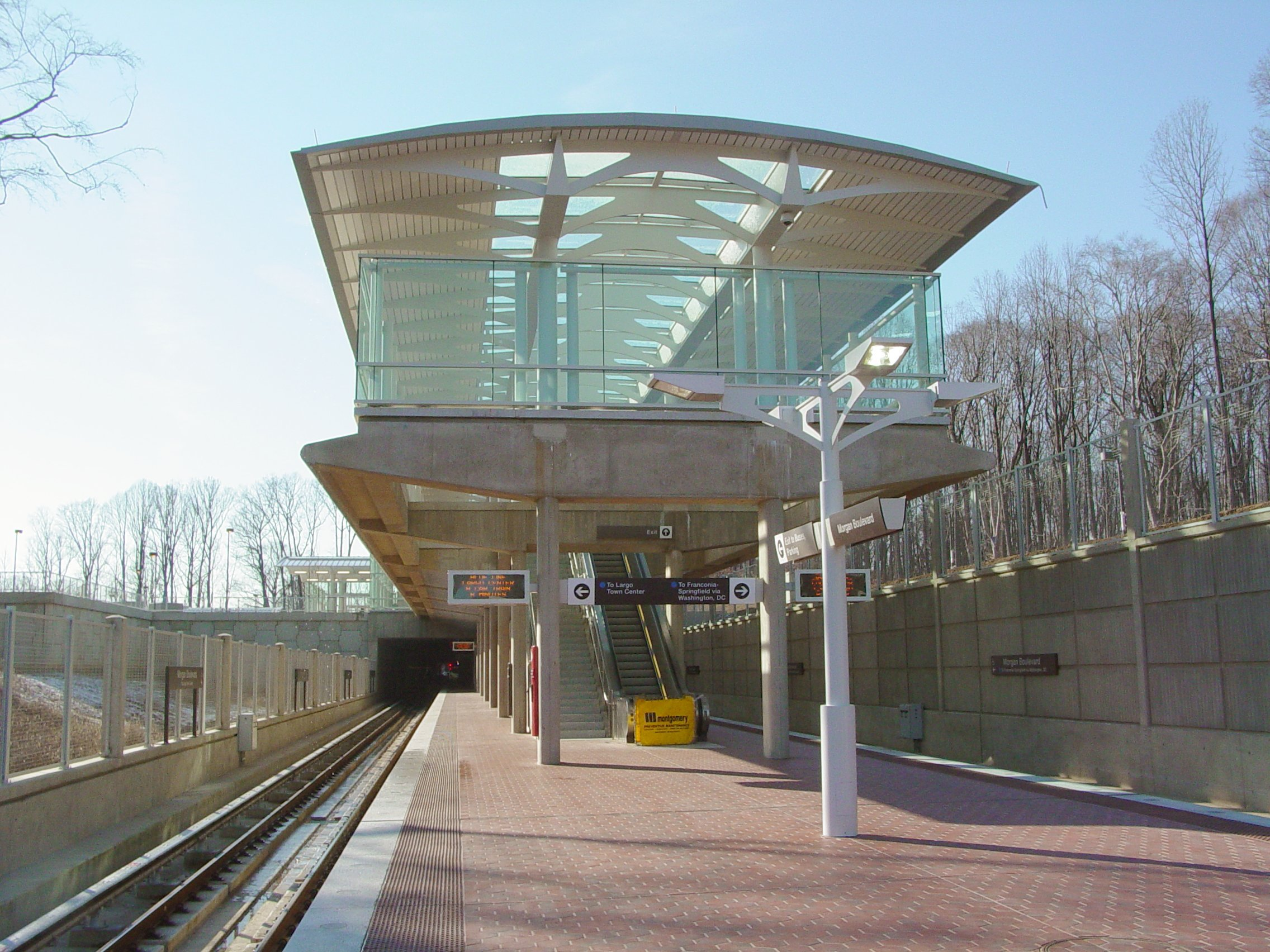
- Morgan Boulevard station in December 2004

General information
- Location: 300 Garrett Morgan Boulevard; Landover, Maryland
- Owner: Washington Metropolitan Area Transit Authority
- Platforms: 1 island platform
- Tracks: 2
- Connections: Metrobus: P61, P63; GoPGC: P56

Construction
- Structure type: Below-grade
- Parking: 635 spaces
- Cycle facilities: Capital Bikeshare, 9 racks, 40 lockers
- Accessible: Yes

Other information
- Station code: G04

History
- Opened: December 18, 2004
- Former names: Summerfield (during construction)

Passengers
- 2025: 1,261 (average weekday)
- Rank: 90 of 98

Services
Preceding station	Washington Metro	Following station
Addison Road toward Ashburn	Silver Line	Downtown Largo Terminus
Addison Road toward Franconia–Springfield	Blue Line	Downtown Largo Terminus
Former services
Preceding station	Washington Metro	Following station
Capitol Heights toward Vienna	Orange Line	Downtown Largo Terminus
Route map
Location

Morgan Boulevard station is an island-platformed Washington Metro station in Summerfield, Prince George's County, Maryland, United States, with a Landover postal address. The station was opened on December 18, 2004, and is operated by the Washington Metropolitan Area Transit Authority (WMATA). It provides service for the Blue and Silver Lines.

== Facilities and nearby landmarks ==
The station is located on Garrett Morgan Boulevard, one mile (1.6 km) from Northwest Stadium, home to the Washington Commanders. The stadium is about a 20 minute walk from the station.

The platform at this station is wider than others and the station features double the number of faregates of similar stations because of the large volumes of passengers using it before and after football games.

== History ==
In October 1996, the proposed routing for the extension of the Blue Line to Largo received a favorable environmental impact statement thus allowing for the project to move forward. The plan represented the first expansion to the original 103-mile (166 km) Metro network and would include both the then named Summerfield and Largo stations. The station gained approval from Congress as part of the extension in February 2000 with the federal government contributing $259 million towards its construction.

Construction began in 2001, and by 2002 its name was changed to Morgan Boulevard as a result of the Prince George's County Board changing the name of the street from Summerfield Boulevard to Morgan Boulevard in memory of the African-American inventor Garrett Morgan. The station opened on December 18, 2004. Its opening coincided with the completion of 3.2 miles (5.1 km) of rail east of the Addison Road station and the opening of Largo Town Center (now Downtown Largo) station. The final cost of building it, its sister station and the rail extension was $456 million.

In December 2012, Morgan Boulevard was one of five stations added to the route of the Silver Line, which was originally supposed to end at the Stadium-Armory station, but was extended into Prince George's County, Maryland to the Largo station (the eastern terminus of the Blue Line) due to safety concerns about a pocket track just past Stadium-Armory. Silver Line service at Morgan Boulevard began on July 26, 2014.

From March 26, 2020 until June 28, 2020, this station was closed due to the 2020 coronavirus pandemic.
