= Branch Avenue station =

Washington Metro station

Coordinates: 38.826995°N 76.912134°W

Branch Avenue
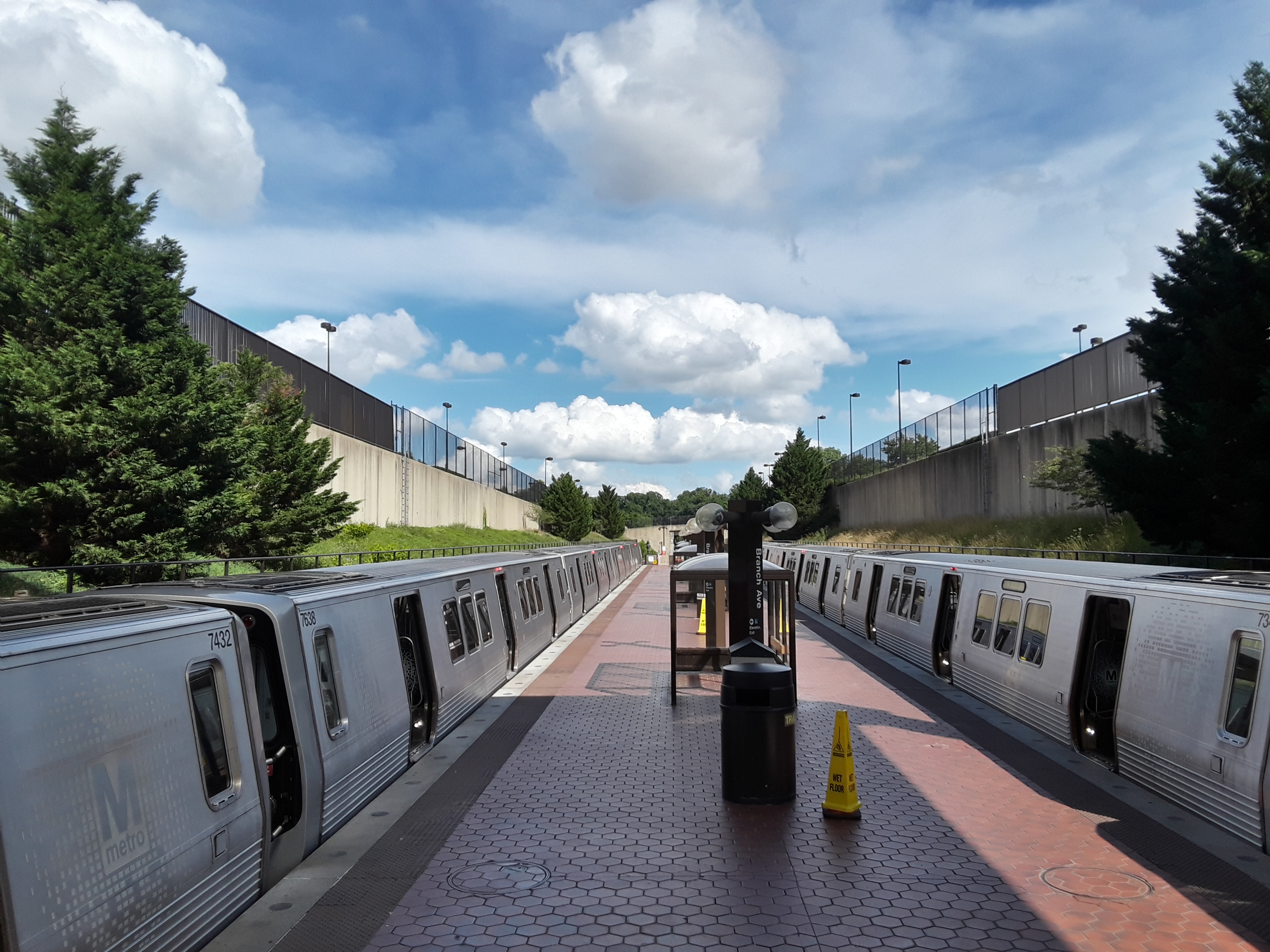
- Station platform facing south in June 2019

General information
- Location: 4704 Old Soper Road; Suitland, Maryland
- Owner: Washington Metropolitan Area Transit Authority
- Platforms: 1 island platform
- Tracks: 2
- Connections: Metrobus: P62; GoPGC: P84, P85, P88

Construction
- Structure type: Open cut
- Parking: 3,072 spaces
- Cycle facilities: 10 racks, 24 lockers
- Accessible: Yes

Other information
- Station code: F11

History
- Opened: January 13, 2001; 25 years ago

Passengers
- 2025: 3,420 (average weekday)
- Rank: 54 of 98

Services
Preceding station	Washington Metro	Following station
Terminus	Green Line	Suitland toward Greenbelt
Route map
Location

Branch Avenue station is an island-platformed Washington Metro station in Suitland, Maryland, United States. The station was opened on January 13, 2001, and is operated by the Washington Metropolitan Area Transit Authority (WMATA). The station presently serves as the southeastern terminus for the Green Line, with the Branch Avenue Rail Yard lying just beyond this station. The station is located near the intersection of Auth Road and Old Soper Road.

This is also the station closest to Andrews Air Force Base.

== History ==
Plans for a station as the southeastern terminus of the Green Line initially appeared in the original 1968 route map. However, by 1978 the Prince George's County Council, after initially supporting the Branch Avenue alignment, changed their support to moving the terminus to a location adjacent to the Rosecroft Raceway. Metro followed suit and pursued the Rosecroft alignment instead of Branch Avenue in 1980. By May a group of citizens filed suit against Metro stating that the route was improperly changed and failed to conform to the plan adopted by county voters in 1968. In February 1981, the court ruled in favor of the plaintiffs in stating the routing to Rosecroft could not be undertaken until it went through public review. After further appeal, in March 1982 the judge ruled that none of the proposed Green Line along the Rosecroft alignment could start construction until it went through the entire planning process again. After deciding to not file an appeal, in December 1984 Metro voted to change the southeastern terminus back to Branch Avenue thus allowing for construction to commence on the Green Line towards Prince George's County.

Groundbreaking for the final segment of the Green Line occurred on September 23, 1995. The station opened on January 13, 2001. Its opening coincided with the completion of approximately 6.5 miles (10.5 km) of rail southeast of Anacostia and the opening of the Congress Heights, Naylor Road, Southern Avenue and Suitland. This represented the completion of the system as originally planned.

== Station layout ==
Branch Avenue station has an island platform in an open cut between Auth Way and Capital Gateway Drive. Parking lots are located both east and west of the station platform. Constructed adjacent to the station is a 37-acre (15 ha) rail yard with the capacity to store 116 cars.
