= 14th Street Line =

14th Street Line can refer to the following transit lines:

- BMT 14th Street Line (rapid transit), Manhattan, New York
- 14th Street Crosstown Line (surface) (bus, formerly streetcar), Manhattan, New York
- 14th Street Line (Washington, D.C.), now the Route 52 and 54 buses
