= 14th Street Limited =

Bus route in Washington, D.C. area

D5X
- 14th Street Limited

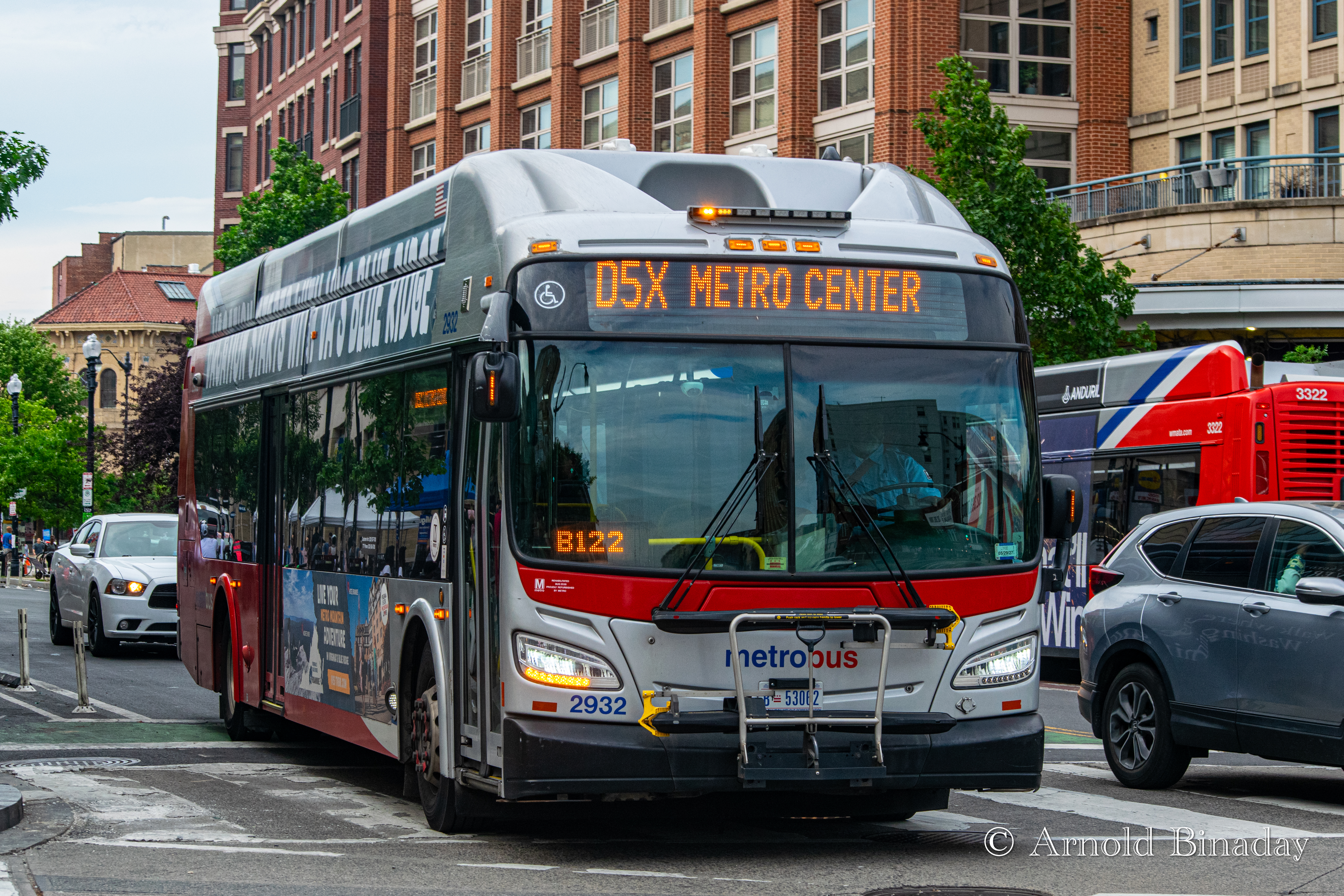
- Route D5X in Columbia Heights

Overview
- System: Metrobus
- Operator: Washington Metropolitan Area Transit Authority
- Garage: Bladensburg
- Livery: MetroExtra
- Status: In Service
- Began service: January 8, 2018
- Predecessors: 59

Route
- Locale: Northwest
- Communities served: Takoma, Brightwood, Columbia Heights, Downtown
- Landmarks served: Takoma station, 14th Street & Colorado Avenue NW, Tivoli Theatre, DC USA, Columbia Heights station, U Street station, Reeves Center, Logan Circle, McPherson Square station, Metro Center station
- Start: Takoma station
- Via: 14th Street NW
- End: Metro Center station
- Other routes: D50 14th Street Local

Service
- Level: Daily
- Frequency: 15 minutes
- Operates: Weekdays: 5:11 AM – 9:45 PM; Saturdays: 6:56 AM – 9:55 PM; Sundays: 6:59 AM - 9:46 PM
- Ridership: 369,094 (FY 2025)
- Transfers: SmarTrip only
- Timetable: 14th Street Limited Line

The 14th Street Limited, designated Route D5X, is a daily limited-stop Metrobus bus route operated by the Washington Metropolitan Area Transit Authority between Takoma station which is served by the Red Line of the Washington Metro, and Metro Center station which is served by the Red, Blue, Orange, and Silver Lines of the Washington Metro. The line operates every 12 minutes during the weekdays, every 16 minutes on Saturdays, and every 20 minutes on Sundays. Trips are roughly 50 minutes long. This line provides additional service along the 14th Street corridor, supplementing route D50.

== Background ==
Route D5X provides limited stop service along the 14th Street corridor, supplementing route D50. The route operates daily. Route D5X operates out of the Bladensburg garage. Prior to 2019, the line would operate out of the Northern division before being closed due to structural problems.

=== Route D5X Stops ===
Bus stop	Direction	Connections
Washington, D.C.
Takoma Station Bus Bay B	Northbound terminal, Southbound station	Metrobus: C75, C77, D50, P42; Ride On: 12, 13, 14, 16, 18, 24, 25; Washington Metro:
4th Street NW / Butternut Street NW	Southbound	Metrobus: C75, D50
Butternut Street NW / 4th Street NW	Northbound	Metrobus: C75, D50
Butternut Street NW / Piney Branch Road NW	Bidirectional	Metrobus: D50
Georgia Avenue NW / Butternut Street NW	Southbound	Metrobus: D40, D4X, D50
Aspen Street NW / 13th Place NW	Northbound	Metrobus: D40, D4X, D50
Aspen Street NW / Georgia Avenue NW	Southbound	Metrobus: D40, D4X, D50
14th Street NW / Aspen Street NW	Bidirectional	Metrobus: D50
14th Street NW / Underwood Street NW	Bidirectional	Metrobus: D50
14th Street NW / Sheridan Street NW	Bidirectional	Metrobus: D50
14th Street NW / Fort Stevens Drive NW	Bidirectional	Metrobus: D50
14th Street NW / Missouri Avenue NW	Northbound	Metrobus: C81, D50
14th Street NW / Oglethorpe Street NW	Southbound	Metrobus: C81, D50
14th Street NW / Montague Street NW	Bidirectional	Metrobus: C81, D50
14th Street NW / Longfellow Street NW	Bidirectional	Metrobus: C81, D50
14th Street NW / Colorado Avenue NW	Northbound	Metrobus: C81, D50
14th Street NW / Jefferson Street NW	Southbound	Metrobus: C81, D50
14th Street NW / Buchanan Street NW	Bidirectional	Metrobus: D50
14th Street NW / Upshur Street NW	Bidirectional	Metrobus: D50
14th Street NW / Spring Road NW	Bidirectional	Metrobus: D50
14th Street NW / Monroe Street NW	Northbound	Metrobus: D50
14th Street NW / Park Road NW	Southbound	Metrobus: D50
14th Street NW / Irving Street NW Columbia Heights station	Bidirectional	Metrobus: C61, D50, D60, D6X, D74; Washington Metro:
14th Street NW / Belmont Street NW	Northbound	Metrobus: D50
14th Street NW / Chapin Street NW	Southbound	Metrobus: D50
14th Street NW / U Street NW U Street station	Bidirectional	Metrobus: C51, C53, C57, D50; Washington Metro:
14th Street NW / P Street NW	Bidirectional	Metrobus: C91, D50
14th Street NW / K Street NW	Bidirectional	Metrobus: A29, A49, D10, D20, D24, D36, D50, D60, D72, D80, D94
14th Street NW / I Street NW McPherson Square station	Bidirectional	Metrobus: A29, A49, D10, D20, D24, D36, D50, D60, D6X, D72, D80, D94; Loudoun County Transit; MTA Maryland Commuter Bus; OmniRide Commuter; Washington Metro:
F Street NW / 13th Street NW Metro Center station	Bidirectional	Metrobus: A29, A49, D10, D20, D24, D32, D34, D36, D44, D5X, D60, D6X, D94; MTA Maryland Bus: 901, 902, 904, 905; Loudoun County Transit; PRTC OmniRide; Ride Smart Northern Shenandoah Valley; Washington Metro:
F Street NW / 12th Street NW Metro Center station	Southbound terminal, Northbound station	Metrobus: A29, A49, D10, D20, D24, D30, D32, D34, D36, D44, D5X, D60, D6X, D94; MTA Maryland Bus: 901, 902, 904, 905; Loudoun County Transit; PRTC OmniRide; Ride Smart Northern Shenandoah Valley; Washington Metro:

== History ==
The 14th Street Line, run by route D50 are one of the most heavily used routes in the Metrobus system with about 15,000 riders using these buses on a typical weekday. Those routes connect Takoma Station to Downtown Washington DC via 14th Street. However, the routes suffers from crowding, delays, traffic, and ineffectiveness due to the routes having at least 26 stops and the frequency of buses are at least 20 minutes. This leads to residents opting for the more efficient 16th Street buses (the S1, S2, and S9, now the D60 and D6X).

The idea for a 14th Street express line went as far back as 2011. In 2011, WMATA teamed up with the DC Department of Transportation to study the 14th Street corridor, with the biggest conclusion being an express service. The study concluded that express bus service on the 14th Street line (it called express service "limited-stop bus service") would benefit riders:

The advantages to this proposal are that this service would not only enhance route capacity, but would also improve service frequencies at bus stops served by the limited stop service (service frequency at local-only stops would not be impacted). It would also reduce travel times for passengers able to utilize the bus stops that would be served by the limited stop service. The primary disadvantage is that this proposal would likely incur additional operating costs.

WMATA also recommended extending route 53 from McPherson Square station up to G street, running more service north of Colorado Avenue NW, and extending service to the Waterfront area, as well as giving riders better information, doing more to enforce parking restrictions, using articulated buses, and training bus operators specifically for the lines they drive.

However, the proposal could not find enough support in previous city budget negotiations, and the idea was scrapped. Since 2012, the 14th Street corridor began to grow even more, with businesses in the area nearly doubling from 7,371 in 2011 to 13,992 in 2015.

=== Proposed New Route ===
The proposal came back between 2016 and 2017 due to the increased ridership along 14th Street and due to more political support.

During WMATA's FY2018 budget, it was proposed that the 14th Street limited stop route be called Route 59, which would operate a limited stop segment between Takoma Station and Federal Triangle Station, replacing route 54's routing between Metro Center Station and Federal Triangle as a response to requests by the District of Columbia and the District Department of Transportation. The route will be implemented as early as December 2017 if passed.

Many residents and local leaders were in favored for the new limited stop service and pushed the DC Council to fund the new route. The proposal was endorsed by several Advisory Neighborhood Commissions in the 14th Street corridor to respond to growing development activity and passenger crowding on local service.

Ward 4 Council member Brandon Todd stated on the 59 proposal:

I strongly support the creation of an express bus line on 14th Street. With increased residential and commercial development along that corridor, there has never been a more important time to make this critical investment in our transportation network...Ward 4 cannot wait any longer for more robust and efficient transportation options.

Ward 1 Council member Brianne Nadeau, a 52 and 54 bus rider herself, has also pledged early support:

As the population along 14th Street continues to grow, it's vital that we provide additional service in this well-utilized corridor... Access to reliable bus service is essential for District residents, and express service on other bus lines has provided relief to those who rely on transit to get around the city.

At-large Council members Robert White, Elissa Silverman, and David Grosso, along with Ward 6's Charles Allen, have also said they support the new bus service.

As an up-town resident far from a Metro station myself," says White, "I know the 59 bus could offer critical economic, transit, and environmental benefits to our residents and neighborhoods and is the closest we can get to bus rapid transit right now.

Funding would still need to be approved with mayor Bowser submitting her budget proposal, and the DC Council will debate and amend it before a final approval in late spring.

On March 29, 2017, DC Mayor Muriel Bowser announced funding for additional service along 14th Street.

On June 13, 2017, the DC Council and DC Mayor Muriel Bowser approved WMATA's FY2018 budget (a $1.2 million budget) which includes the new limited stop route along 14th Street. Councilmembers who publicly advocated in favor of 59 funding include Brianne Nadeau, Brandon Todd, Jack Evans, Elissa Silverman, David Grosso, Charles Allen, and Robert White. The new route will begin in December 2017 to ease out the overcrowding already on routes 52, 53, and 54.

=== Route Implication ===
In December 2017, WMATA announced that route 59 would begin service on January 8, 2018. The new route 59 will operate between Takoma station and Federal Triangle station along the 14th Street corridor, making limited stops every 15 minutes during weekday rush hours only between 6:30 and 9:30 AM and 3:45-7:00 PM. Route 59 will enhance route capacity and also improve service frequencies at stops served by the limited-stop bus.

In the process of the new route 59, route 52 was extended to Southwest Waterfront, discontinuing service along D street, route 53 was discontinued and replaced by route 54, and route 54 was shorten to Metro Center, with Federal Triangle service replaced by route 59. All the changes happened on December 17, 2017, while route 59 began service on January 8, 2018.

The launch of Route 59 was met with positive feedback from 14th Street residents, council members, and riders on its first day. DC Mayor Muriel Bowser held a press conference with riders following the inaugural ride from Takoma Station. After Mayor Bowser's ride, she stated;

Safe and reliable public transportation makes it easier for residents to get to work, school, and beyond. The 14th Street corridor has seen substantial economic development and growth, making it one of the most heavily traveled corridors in the District. As the District continues to grow, we're going to continue finding ways to make it easier for our residents to share in our prosperity.

The route was successful on its first day and helped out routes 52 and 54 from overcrowding and delays.

=== Changes ===
In 2019, during WMATA's FY2021 year, WMATA proposed to give route 59 daily service in order to replace route 54. Route 59 will operate every 8 minutes during peak hours and during the same span as route 54 during off peak hours and weekends. However, the route will become a local route between 14th and Colorado and Takoma station serving all stops in between the two points.

This was due to the following reasons:

- To streamline service and simplify the route structure, making service easier for customers to understand.
- To provide all-day, 7-day-a-week limited-stop service on 14th Street to complement DDOT's planned 14th Street bus priority projects in Columbia Heights.
- To maintain frequent service on upper 14th Street north of Colorado Avenue, Aspen Street, and Butternut Street, where there is one travel lane in each direction, and it is difficult for MetroExtra buses to pass local buses.

About 4,800 riders board Route 52 or 54 local service at stops south of 14th Street & Colorado Avenue that are not served by Route 59, which would see a 50% reduction in frequency of local service. This is approximately 38% of the total 12,800 riders that board all 52, 54 buses on an average weekday, according to WMATA. Approximate frequency at stops south of Colorado Avenue would be as follows:

	52 Local Only Stops	52 and 59 Local and Limited Service Stops
Weekday Peak Periods	10 minutes	5 minutes
Weekday Off-Peak Periods	16 minutes	8 minutes
Saturday	20 minutes	10 minutes
Sunday	30 minutes	15 minutes

If the proposals were to go through, routes 52 and 59 would be the only two routes running along the 14th Street Corridor. However, WMATA later backed out of the proposals due to customer pushback on April 2, 2020.

All Route 59 service was suspended during the COVID-19 pandemic. The route would later resume on August 23, 2020.

In February 2021, during the FY2022 budget, WMATA proposed to eliminate the 59 in the second half of the fiscal year if WMATA does not get any federal funding. Subsequently on April 22, 2021, WMATA approved the FY2022 budget and received federal funding to avoid service cuts.

Due to rising cases of the COVID-19 Omicron variant, all Route 59 service was suspended when WMATA reduced its weekday service to Saturday Supplemental service. Route 59 resumed service on February 7, 2022.

=== Better Bus Redesign ===
In 2022, WMATA launched its Better Bus Redesign project, which aimed to redesign the entire Metrobus Network and is the first full redesign of the agency's bus network in its history.

In April 2023, WMATA launched its Draft Visionary Network. As part of the drafts, WMATA proposed to combine the 52, 54, and 59 into one route, operating between Takoma station and L'Enfant Plaza station, named Route DC106 in the drafts.

During WMATA's Revised Draft Visionary Network, WMATA renamed the DC106 into two different routes. The first route was named Route D52, and was proposed to operate between 14th Street & Colorado Avenue NW and Waterfront station via 14th Street NW, Maine Avenue SW, and M Street SW. The second route was named Route D54 and was proposed to operate between Takoma station and Metro Center station via Carroll Street NW, Butternut Street NW, Aspen Street NW, 14th Street NW, F Street NW, 12th Street NW, G Street NW, and 11th Street NW. Late-night service would be extended to L'Enfant Plaza station. All changes were then proposed during WMATA's 2025 Proposed Network.

During the proposals, WMATA made further changes to the proposed 14th Street Line. The D52 was changed to Route D5X, which would operate the former D54 proposed routing between Takoma station and Metro Center Station. The D54 was also changed to Route D50, and was modified to operate the former proposed D52 routing between 14th Street & Colorado Avenue NW and Waterfront station. Late-night service would operate between Takoma Station and L'Enfant Plaza station, combining the D50 and D5X services into one. Initial plans were for the D52 to be cut and replaced by the D5X, the D5X operating between Takoma station and Waterfront station, and the D54 operarting between Takoma station and Metro Center station.

On November 21, 2024, WMATA approved its Better Bus Redesign Network, with service on the 14th Street Line being simplified.

Beginning on June 29, 2025, Route 59 was renamed to the D5X and operates between Takoma Station and Metro Center Station, upgraded to run all day, daily service, essentially approving the 2019 proposed changes.
