= 14th Street Line (Washington, D.C.) =

Daily bus route in Washington, D.C., United States

D50
- 14th Street Line

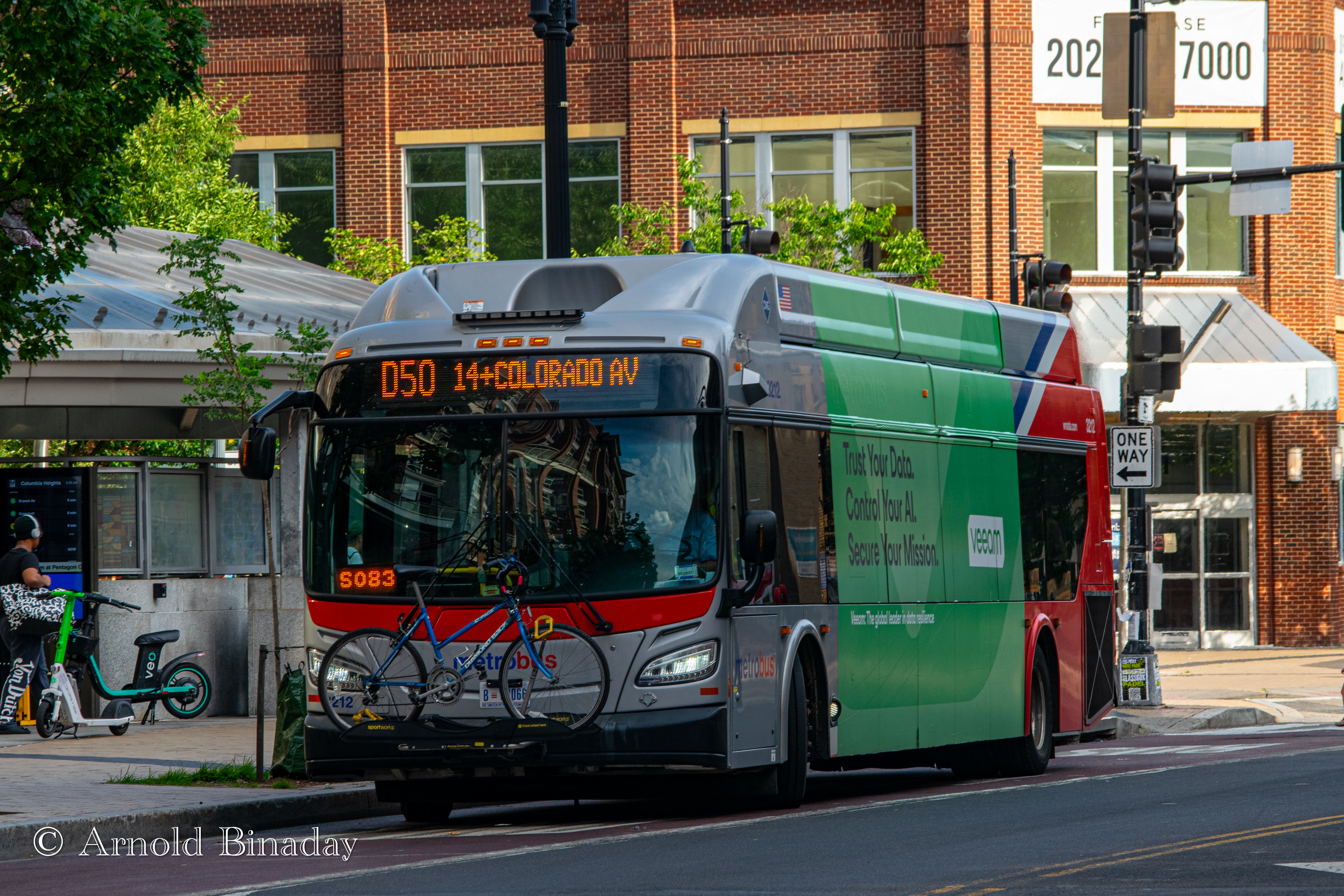
- Route D50 in Columbia Heights

Overview
- System: Metrobus
- Operator: Washington Metropolitan Area Transit Authority
- Garage: Western; Bladensburg; Shepherd Parkway
- Livery: Local
- Status: Active
- Predecessors: 52, 54

Route
- Locale: Northwest, Southwest
- Communities served: Takoma, Brightwood, Columbia Heights, Downtown, Southwest Waterfront
- Landmarks served: Takoma station, 14th Street & Colorado Avenue NW, Tivoli Theatre, DC USA, Columbia Heights station, U Street station, Reeves Center, Logan Circle, McPherson Square station, Smithsonian station, The Wharf, L'Enfant Plaza station, Arena Stage, Waterfront station
- Start: Takoma station (Late nights); 14th Street & Colorado Avenue NW
- Via: 14th Street NW
- End: Waterfront station L'Enfant Plaza station (D & 7th Streets SW) (Late nights)
- Length: 40-60 minutes
- Other routes: D5X 14th Street Limited

Service
- Level: Daily
- Frequency: 12 to 20 minutes (7AM-9PM); 20 minutes (After 9PM)
- Operates: 24 hours
- Ridership: 2,482,554 (52)(FY 2025); 2,654,062 (54)(FY 2025)
- Transfers: SmarTrip only
- Timetable: 14th Street Line

The 14th Street Line, designated Route D50, is a daily bus route operated by the Washington Metropolitan Area Transit Authority. It is one of the most heavily used routes in the Metrobus system; about 15,000 riders use it on a typical weekday.

Buses run 24 hours a day, operating between 14th Street & Colorado Avenue NW and Waterfront station of the Green Line of the Washington Metro. From late night to early morning, buses run between L'Enfant Plaza station of the Green, Yellow, Blue, Orange and Silver Lines and Takoma station of the Red Line of the Washington Metro. On school days, some Route D50 trips run north from 14th and Aspen Streets NW or Reeves Center.

The line operates every 12 to 20 minutes during the day and every 20 minutes at night. Buses cover the route in roughly 40 to 60 minutes.

Route D50 operates from Shepherd Parkway and Western Division; late-night service operates from Bladensburg Division.

== History ==
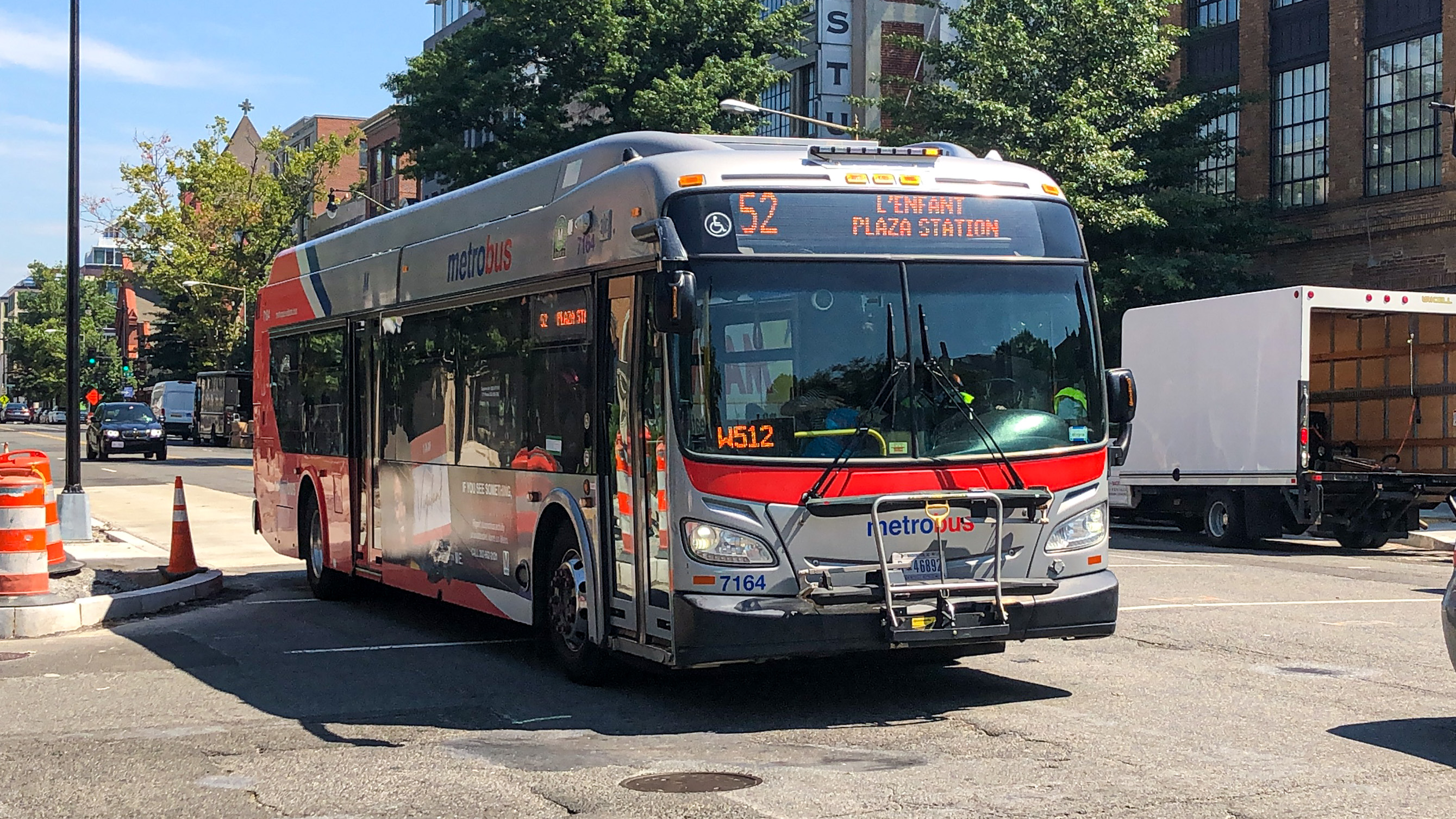
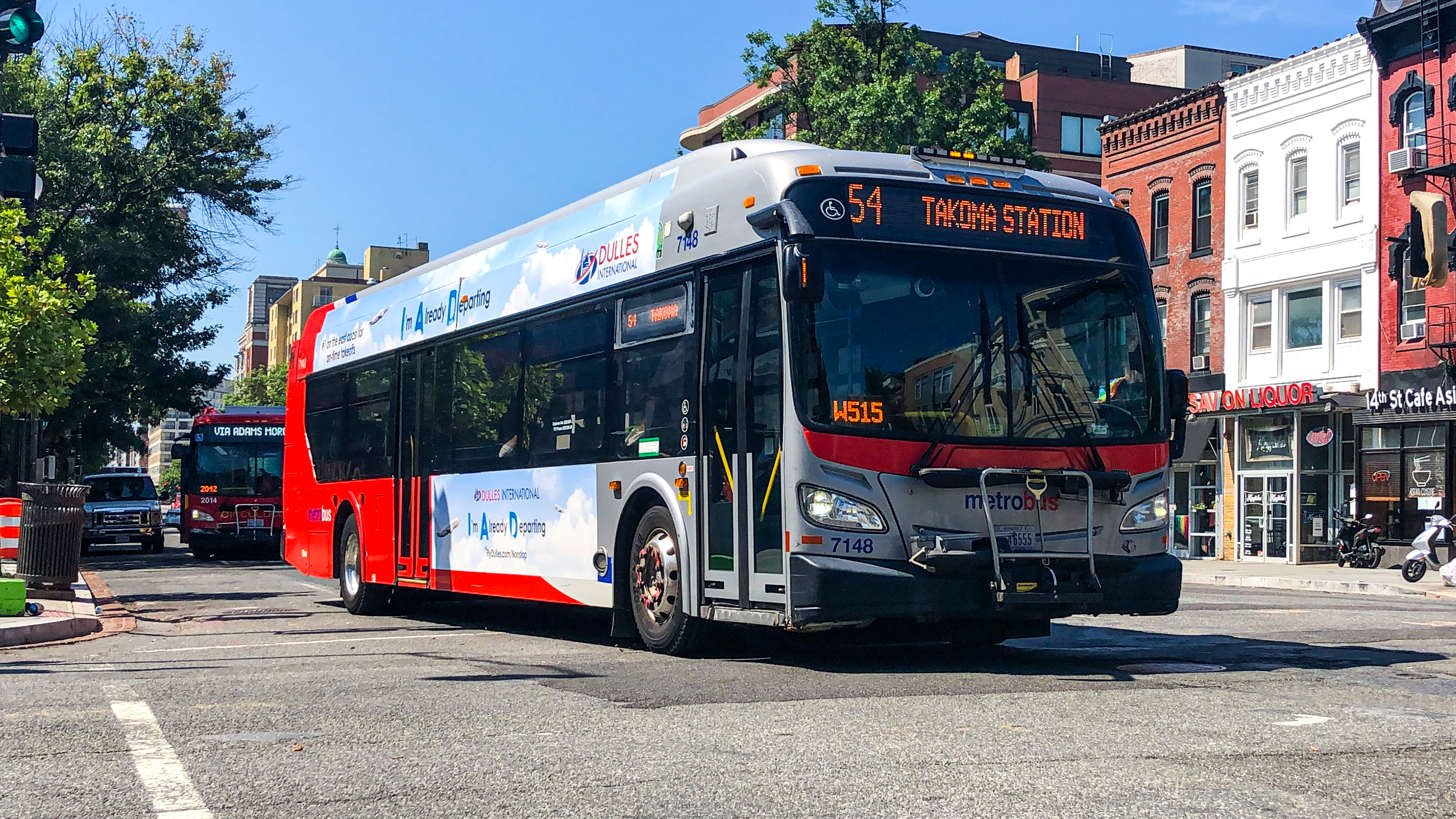
Former Routes 52 and 54.

=== Streetcar era ===
The 14th Street line was originally a streetcar line. On September 21, 1895, the Rock Creek Railway bought the Washington and Georgetown and changed its name to the Capital Traction Company.

In 1896, the former Rock Creek line experimented with a new power system on U Street NW between 9th Street NW and 18th Street NW. The Love system transmitted electricity through a set of trolley wheels running on underground conduit rails. The system worked but was replaced in the spring of 1899 by the less-expensive sliding shoe used elsewhere. The line was extended to the Calvert Street Loop.

Meanwhile, the branch of the Pennsylvania Avenue Line from the east edge of the White House northeast on New York Avenue and north on 14th Street Northwest to Florida Avenue, part of the original charter, was opened November 15, 1862. A law passed June 30, 1864, allowed it to continue the line north; it was eventually extended to Park Road and later to Colorado Avenue, where it connected to the Washington and Maryland Line.

The line was originally run by cable cars. After the powerhouse along 14th Street burned down, the line was electrified on February 27, 1898. The Pennsylvania Avenue Line and 7th Street Line followed in 1898.

By the 1920s, cars were turned at four northern terminals: Park Road, Decatur Street, Colorado Avenue, and Takoma (via the Washington and Maryland Line). Some Park Road cars turned west on Pennsylvania Avenue, while cars from all four terminals turned east. 14th Street was also used by Chevy Chase Line cars to Chevy Chase Lake, which turned off at the U Street Line.

The North American Company, a transit and utilities holding company began to acquire stock in the Washington Railway in 1922, gaining a controlling interest by 1928. By December 31, 1933, it owned 50.016% of the voting stock. North American tried to purchase Capital Traction, but Capital Traction always remained widely owned by the residents of Washington, without a principal stock holder. North American never owned more than 2.5% of Capital Traction stock.

The Great Depression proved difficult for the transit companies. On December 1, 1933, Washington Railway and Electric Company, Capital Traction, and Washington Rapid Transit merged to form the Capital Transit Company. Washington Railway continued as a holding company, owning half of Capital Transit and all of PEPCO, but Capital Traction was later dissolved. For the first time, street railways in Washington were under the management of one company.

After the 1933 consolidation, the Fourteenth Street Line was combined with part of the ex-Washington Railway and Electric Company Fourth Street Line, which used Fourteenth Street from the White House south to the Bureau of Engraving, where a new underground terminal was built. It later formed routes 50, 52, and 54 which were used the old Fourteenth Street Line, running respectively to the Bureau of Engraving, the ex-WR&E Eleventh Street Line (via U Street), and the Pennsylvania Avenue Line to the Navy Yard. Route 52 was discontinued which ran to U street and 11th Street, but 50 and 54 remained until January 28, 1962.

=== Buses take over ===
Routes 50 and 54 were acquired to run by buses under DC Transit when streetcars began to phase out. Routes 50 and 54 operated from Takoma and Bureau of Engraving and Printing (50) and Navy Yard (54) primarily running along 14th Street. Route 52 would also be reincarnated to operate a similar pattern to route 52 but altered slightly running via Independence Avenue, 12th Street, and D street. Most trips would end at 14th and Colorado while some trips are extended to Takoma. Routes 50, 52, and 54 eventually became Metrobus routes on February 4, 1973, when WMATA acquired DC Transit and three other transit agencies.

Other routes that weren't formed under the Metrobus tag were the 56 and 58. Route 56 operated from Summit Hills Apartments to the Bureau of Engraving and route 58 operated to Takoma. Route 56 was renamed routes 50, 52, and 54 after the 1973 merger. Route 58 was later renamed K8.

On February 6, 1978, routes 50, 52, and 54 were rerouted to serve the new Takoma station to connect riders to the Washington Metro. By the mid-1990s, route 50 was discontinued, route 52 was shortened to L'Enfant Plaza station, and route 54 was shortened to Federal Triangle. Route 54 was later extended to the L'Enfant Plaza station during the 1990s. Several years after Route 50 was eliminated, a new Route 53 was introduced to operate along the former route 50 routing between Takoma station and the Bureau of Engraving. It was then later shortened to Federal Triangle and then later shortened to Franklin Square/McPherson Square station.

In 2013, riders complained that the buses were slow because of traffic and the 26-stop routes. Headways between buses were at least 20 minutes. Some riders opted for 16th Street buses (the S1, S2, S4, and S9, now D60 and D6X) until 2017.

In 2015, WMATA proposed to cut back the 54 to McPherson Square station due to low ridership south of the station. Service to Archives station and L'Enfant Plaza station would be discontinued. However it was also proposed to improve the frequency of buses between Takoma station and 14th Street and Colorado due to high ridership volume.

On June 26, 2016, route 54 was shortened to Federal Triangle with alternative service provided by routes 52 and 53. However, the frequency of buses increased between Takoma station and 14th Street and Colorado.

In 2017, WMATA proposed many changes to the 52, 53, and 54. Route 52 was to be rerouted to serve the Wharf development via 12th Street, Maine Avenue, and 7th Street SW to and from L'Enfant Plaza station. WMATA also proposed to combine routes 53 and 54 into a new route 54 operating between Metro Center (12th and F Streets NW) and Takoma stations. WMATA would also adjust the weekday schedule to coordinate local route 52 and 54 services with a proposed new MetroExtra limited-stop route 59, serve the Wharf, and decrease the time between buses to Takoma station.

These proposed changes were to provide service to the new Wharf development, coordinate schedules with new route 59 limited-stop service, simplify 14th Street service and route designations, alleviate bus congestion at Franklin Square, and responds to requests by the District of Columbia and District Department of Transportation. Performance measures for routes 52, 53, and 54:

Measure	Routes 52, 53, 54	WMATA guideline	Pass/fail
Average weekday riders	13,058	432	Pass
Cost recovery	33%	16.6%	Pass
Subsidy per rider	$1.72	$4.81	Pass
Riders per trip	40	10.7	Pass
Riders per revenue mile	7.0	1.3	Pass

At the time of the proposals, routes 52 and 54 would mainly operate up to 14th Street and Colorado and would only run to Takoma station during select times and Sundays (it would start at Takoma station however). Route 53 would operate between Monday and Saturday only its full route.

On June 13, 2017, the DC Council and DC Mayor Muriel Bowser approved WMATA's FY2018 budget (a $1.2 million budget) which includes the new limited stop route and reconstructed service along 14th Street. Changes will be implemented as soon as December 2017.

On December 17, 2017, route 52 was extended along 12th Street and Maine Avenue SW to serve the Wharf development to and from L'Enfant Plaza station with most service along D Street being discontinued. Routes 53 and 54 were combined into one route operating between Takoma station and Metro Center station (F & 12th streets NW) with the 53 designation and service to Federal Triangle being discontinued. A new route 59 limited-stop route was also introduced to operate alongside routes 52 and 54 between Takoma station and Federal Triangle which replaced the 54 portion between Metro Center and Federal Triangle and fully replaced route 53. Service began on January 8, 2018.

In 2019, WMATA proposed to replace Route 54 with Route 59, which would run 54's off-peak hours and weekend schedule, plus buses every eight minutes during peak hours. 59 would be a local route between 14th and Colorado and Takoma station, serving all stops in between the two points. Officials said the changes would:

- Streamline service and simplify the route structure to make it easier for customers to understand.
- Provide all-day, 7-day-a-week limited-stop service on 14th Street to complement DDOT's planned 14th Street bus priority projects in Columbia Heights.
- Maintain frequent service on upper 14th Street north of Colorado Avenue, Aspen Street and Butternut Street, where there is one travel lane in each direction and it is difficult for MetroExtra buses to pass local buses.

As of 2019, about 4,800 riders boarded Route 52 or 54 local service at stops south of 14th Street & Colorado Avenue that are not served by route 59, which would see halving in frequency of local service. This is about 38% of the total 12,800 riders that board all 52 and 54 buses on an average weekday. Approximate frequency at stops south of Colorado Avenue would be:

	52 Local Only Stops	52 and 59 Local and Limited Service Stops
Weekday Peak Periods	10 minutes	5 minutes
Weekday Off-Peak Periods	16 minutes	8 minutes
Saturday	20 minutes	10 minutes
Sunday	30 minutes	15 minutes

These changes would have made routes 52 and 59 the only two on the 14th Street Corridor, but WMATA announced that customer pushback scuttled the proposals on April 2, 2020.

During the COVID-19 pandemic, weekday service on the line was reduced, first to its Saturday supplemental schedule on March 16, 2020, then to its Sunday schedule two days later. On March 21, 2020, weekend service on the 52 was suspended and Route 54 service was reduced to every 30 minutes. Service was restored on August 23, 2020.

In February 2021 during WMATA's FY2022 budget crisis, WMATA proposed to increase span to add late-night service to 2:00 AM on Route 52 between July and December 2021 in the first half of the fiscal year, but would reduce it back to midnight between January to June 2022 in the second half of the fiscal year. Subsequently on April 22, 2021, WMATA approved the FY2022 budget and received federal funding to avoid service cuts.

On June 6, 2021, late-night service was increased to operate up to 2:00 AM for Route 52.

On June 10, 2021, WMATA proposed to increase the 52 and 54 to operate every 12 minutes daily between 7:00 AM to 9:00 PM daily as part of WMATA's Pandemic Recovery Plan.

On September 5, 2021, the daily frequency of buses increased to 12 minutes.

Due to rising cases of the COVID-19 Omicron variant, the line was reduced to its Saturday service on weekdays. Full weekday service resumed on February 7, 2022.

On December 17, 2023, new 24 hour service was added to Route 52.

In 2024 during WMATA's FY2024 Budget crisis, WMATA proposed to terminate all 52 service at Metro Center station. Route 52 service between 14th Street south of F Street NW and L'Enfant Plaza station would be eliminated. However on April 25, 2024, Metro’s Board of Directors approved a $4.8 billion capital and operating budget which avoided service cuts.

=== Better Bus Redesign ===
In 2022, WMATA launched its Better Bus Redesign project, its first-ever redesign of the entire Metrobus route system.

In April 2023, WMATA released a first draft of the new route plan, dubbed Draft Visionary Network. It proposed to combine the 52, 54, and 59 into a single Route DC106 operating between Takoma station and L'Enfant Plaza station.

A second draft, called Revised Draft Visionary Network, split the DC106 into two routes: Route D52, to run between 14th Street & Colorado Avenue NW and Waterfront station via 14th Street NW, Maine Street SW, and M Street SW; and Route D54, to run between Takoma station and Metro Center station via Carroll Street NW, Butternut Street NW, Aspen Street NW, 14th Street NW, F Street NW, 12th Street NW, G Street NW, and 11th Street NW. Late-night service would be extended to L'Enfant Plaza station.

A third draft, called 2025 Proposed Network, proposed further changes to the 14th Street Line. The D52 was changed to Route D5X, which would operate the former D54 proposed routing between Takoma station and Metro Center station. The D54 was also changed to Route D50, and was modified to operate the former proposed D52 routing between 14th Street & Colorado Avenue NW and Waterfront station. Late-night service would operate between Takoma station and L'Enfant Plaza station, combining the D50 and D5X services into one. Initial plans were for the D52 to be cut and replaced by the D5X, the D5X operating between Takoma station and Waterfront station, and the D54 operarting between Takoma station and Metro Center station.

On November 21, 2024, WMATA approved its Better Bus Redesign Network.

Beginning on June 29, 2025, Routes 52 and 54 were renamed D50 and operates between 14th Street & Colorado Avenue NW and Waterfront station, with late-night service operating between L'Enfant Plaza station and Takoma station. Daytime service to Takoma was replaced by the D5X, essentially approving the 2019 proposals.

== Incidents ==
- On January 11, 2023, two children were shot aboard a 54 bus on 14th Street near Fort Stevens Drive. The suspect fled the scene.
