= DC USA =

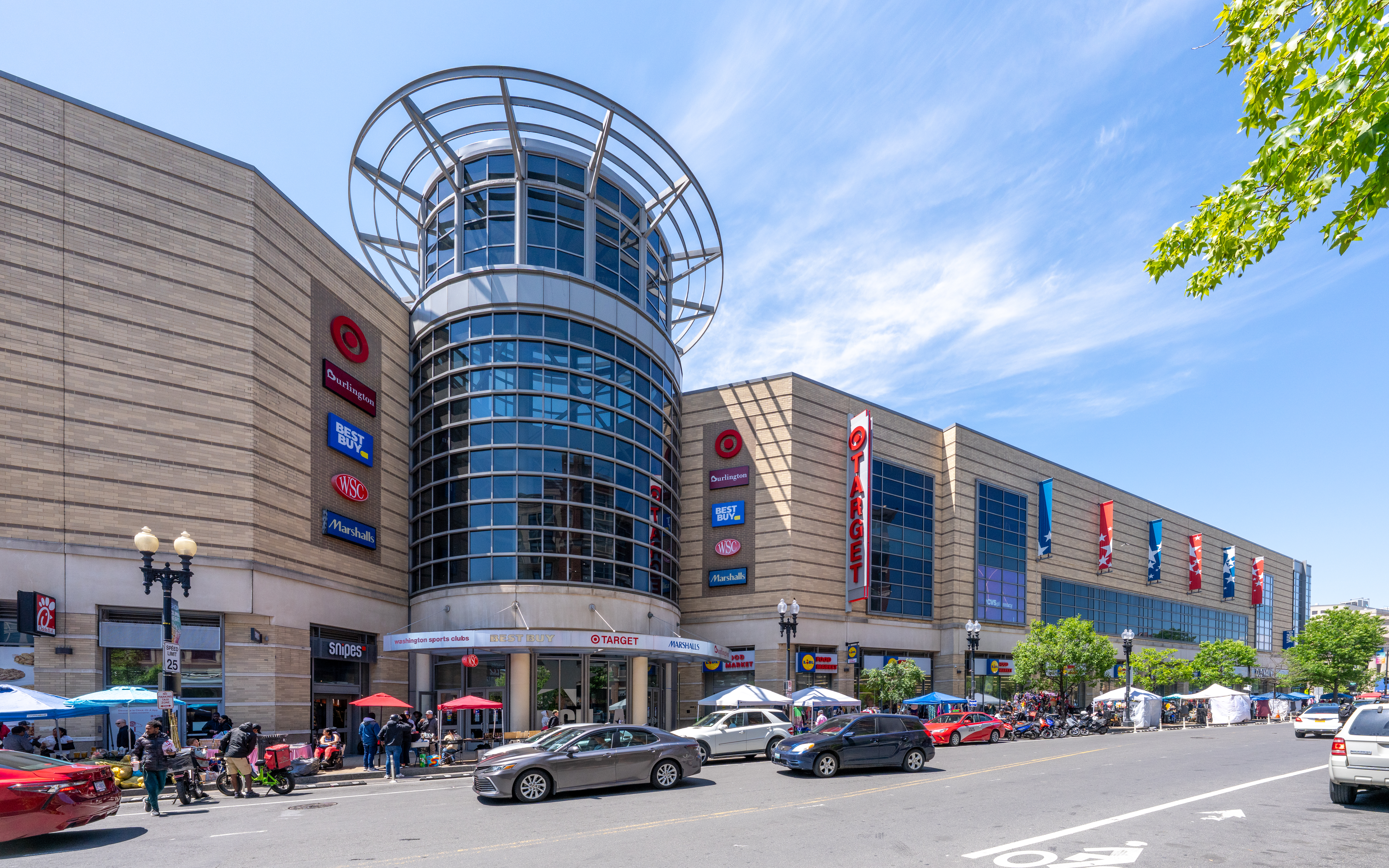
- Location: Washington, D.C., United States
- Coordinates: 38°55′46″N 77°02′01″W
- Address: 3100 14th Street NW
- Opened: February 2008
- Owner: DC USA Operating Co., LLC
- Architect: Bower Lewis Thrower Architects
- Num. of anchor tenants: 9
- Floor area: 546,000 square feet (50,700 m^{2})
- Floors: 3
- Parking: 1,000 spaces
- Public transit: at Columbia Heights (Washington Metro); Metrobus: C61, D50, D5X, D60, D6X, D74
- Website: shopdcusa.com

DC USA is an 890,000-square-foot (83,000 m^{2}) vertical power center, i.e. a multilevel enclosed urban shopping center anchored by big box stores. It is located in the Columbia Heights neighborhood of Washington, D.C. A Washington City Paper poll named DC USA the "Best Designed Retail Space" of 2009. The development is adjacent to the Columbia Heights station on the Green and Yellow Lines of the Washington Metro. It is also served by six bus routes and has a 1,000-space parking garage.

The complex is accessible to more than 36,000 residents within a 10-minute walk of the site. A total of 335,000 residents live within a 3-mile (4.8 km) radius. The development has been designed to fit into its urban setting, with the buildings holding the street line to frame the sidewalks and continue the urban scale.

Target, one of the anchors, has expanded its urban store concept to numerous cities across the country.

== Site history ==
DC USA sits on the site of the old Romanesque Revival style electric streetcar garage of the Capitol Traction Company built in 1892, located at what was then the terminus of a streetcar line. After the line was extended north the building was no longer needed as a car barn and in 1910, investors repurposed it as an entertainment complex, The Arcade. It contained ground floor retail space, an auditorium, dance hall, cinema, small Dutch restaurant, pool, bowling alley, and food market with over 100 vendor stalls. After commercial decline and debt, Kress purchased the building in 1947 and tore it down, eventually building a two-story commercial building that would house a Safeway supermarket and People's Drug store.
