= Lake Artemesia =

Artificial lake in Prince George's County, Maryland, United States

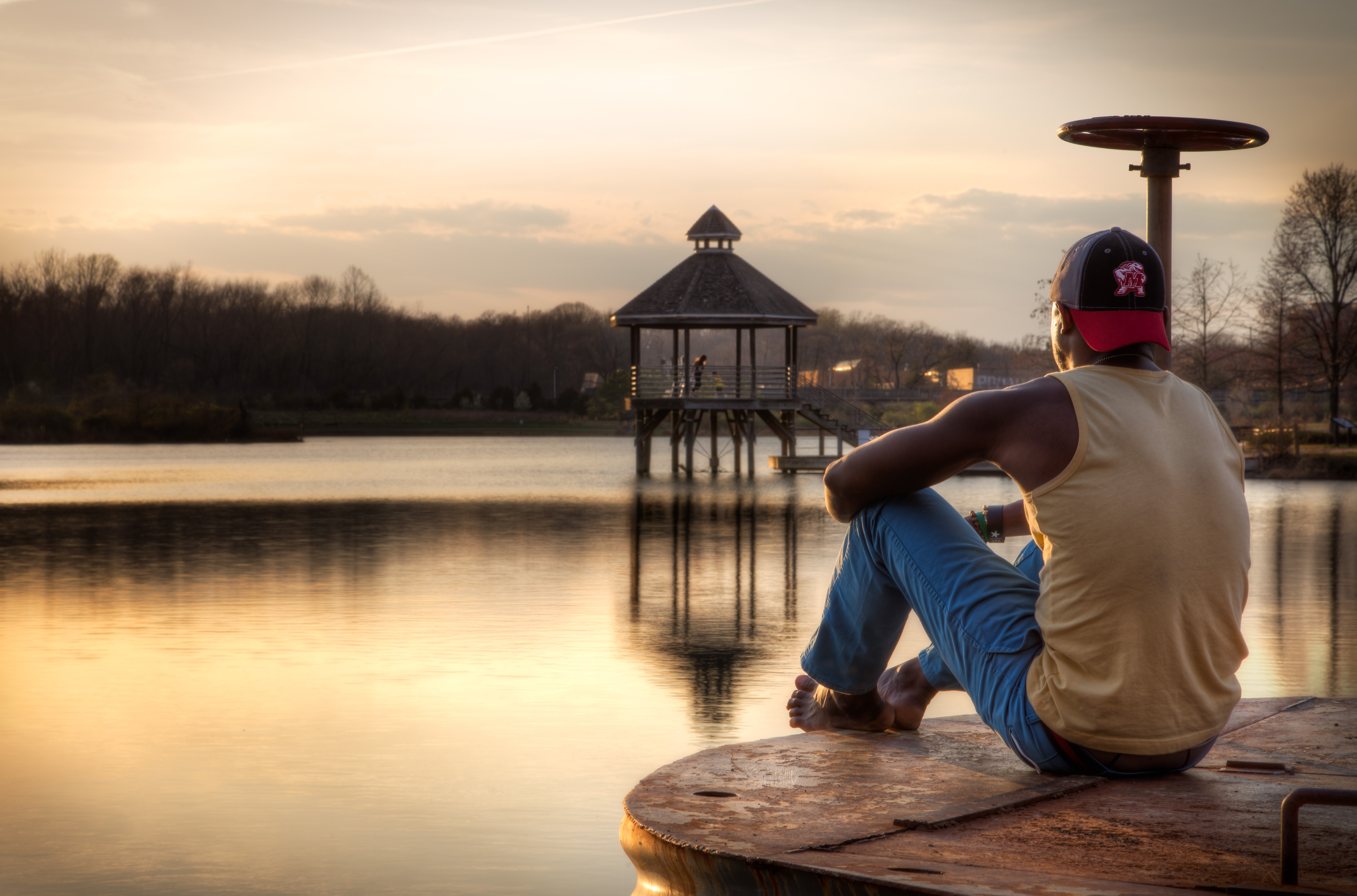
- View of the gazebo

- Location within Maryland Location within the United States
- Location: College Park, Prince George's County, Maryland, United States
- Coordinates: 38°59′12″N 76°55′20″W
- Basin countries: United States
- Surface area: 38 acres (150,000 m^{2})
- Surface elevation: 43 ft (13 m)

Lake Artemesia is an artificial lake in Prince George's County, Maryland, located within the Lake Artemesia Natural Area in College Park and Berwyn Heights. The lake covers an area of 38 acres (0.15 km^{2}), and the surrounding natural area is administered by Maryland-National Capital Park and Planning Commission and includes aquatic gardens, fishing piers, and hiker-biker trails.

The lake, located between Indian Creek and Paint Branch, was constructed during the late-1980s completion of the Washington Metro's Green Line, which runs alongside the lake. Sand and gravel were excavated from the site of a smaller lake and the surrounding area to construct the rail beds and parking lots for the College Park–University of Maryland and Greenbelt stations. Metro saved $10 million by sourcing the material locally and in return spent $8 million constructing the lake and natural area to repair the excavation damage. During the construction phase, signs identified the site as "Lake Metro."

The park is named for Artemesia N. Drefs, who donated ten lots to the county for preservation as open space in 1972. The smaller lake that existed on the site, which was created in the mid-1800s when stone was quarried from the area for use on the B&O Railroad's Washington Branch line, was already named Lake Artemesia after Artemesia's mother and grandmother, who shared the same name. Drefs's father, Arthur, surveyed the land for his Lakeland development in the 1890s; according to Drefs, the pre-existing lake was originally used to raise goldfish, but was later stocked with bass.

The 1.35 mile hiker-biker trail around the lake is part of the Anacostia Tributary Trail System and East Coast Greenway.

The site of Lake Artemesia Park was once home to about one third of the Lakeland community, an African-American community which became part of College Park, Maryland in 1945.
