= Waterfront Station =

Waterfront station may refer to:

- Waterfront station (Vancouver), a major intermodal public transportation facility and the main transit terminus in Downtown Vancouver, British Columbia, Canada
- Waterfront station (Washington Metro), a Washington Metro station in the Southwest Waterfront neighborhood of Washington, D.C., United States
