= Green Line (Washington Metro) =

Washington Metro rapid transit line

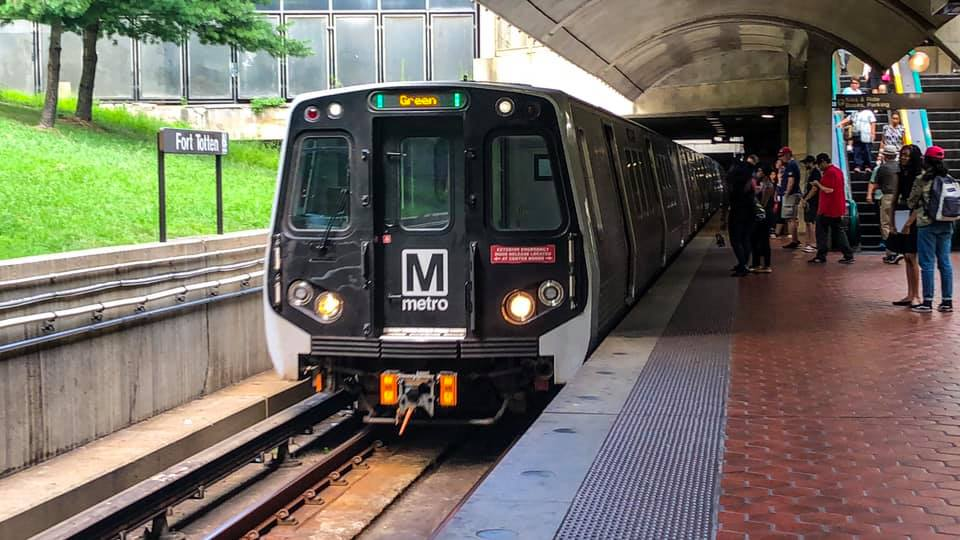
- Southbound Green Line train arriving at Fort Totten in July 2019

Overview
- Status: Operating
- Locale: Prince George's County, MD; Washington, D.C.
- Termini: Branch Avenue; Greenbelt
- Stations: 21

Service
- Type: Rapid transit
- System: Washington Metro
- Operator: Washington Metropolitan Area Transit Authority
- Rolling stock: 3000-series, 6000-series, 7000-series

History
- Opened: May 11, 1991; 35 years ago

Technical
- Line length: 23.04 mi (37.1 km)
- Number of tracks: 2
- Character: At-grade, elevated, and underground
- Track gauge: 4 ft 8 1/4 in (1,429 mm)
- Electrification: Third rail, 750 V DC
Route map
Green Line highlighted in green

Washington Metro system map

The Green Line is a rapid transit line of the Washington Metro system, consisting of 21 stations in Washington, D.C., and Prince George's County, Maryland, United States. The Green Line runs from Branch Avenue to Greenbelt, connecting the southeast suburbs to the northeast suburbs through downtown Washington, D.C.

It was the last line in the original Metro plan to be constructed. Planning for the Green Line began in 1968, at which point it was supposed to serve some of the poorest neighborhoods in Washington, D.C. Delays arose due to various disputes, including disagreements over funding and the line's routing. Partial service began in 1991. The line was completed on January 13, 2001, with the opening of the line's final five stations, marking the completion of the original 101-mile (163 km) system.

It is one of three north–south lines through the city of Washington. The Green Line shares track with the Yellow Line from L'Enfant Plaza to Greenbelt.

On weekdays, trains run every six minutes until 9:30 p.m. and every 7.5 minutes afterward. On weekends, trains run every eight minutes.

== Planning ==
Planning for Metro began with the Mass Transportation Survey in 1955, which attempted to forecast what freeway and mass transit systems would meet the needs of the region in 1980. In 1959, the study's final report included two rapid transit lines which anticipated subways in downtown Washington. Because the plan called for extensive freeway construction within the District of Columbia, alarmed residents lobbied for legislation that created a new transportation agency and blocked freeway construction. The agency, the National Capital Transportation Administration, issued a 1962 Transportation in the National Capital Region report, which did not include the route that became the Green Line. A central route under 7th Street in downtown was only added in 1967 primarily to serve the "inner city."

In March 1968, the Washington Metropolitan Area Transit Authority (WMATA) board approved its 98-mile (158 km) Adopted Regional System (ARS) which included the Green Line from Branch Avenue to Greenbelt. It also foresaw possible future extensions to Laurel, Maryland and Brandywine, Maryland.

=== Early decision making ===
Mid-century plans for rapid transit neglected some of the District's less affluent neighborhoods. By late 1966, some plans started to include a line along 7th Street in the District of Columbia. In 1968, the new WMATA included the line in its master plan for its proposed 101 miles (163 km) system. At that time, a Green Line was planned to pass through some of the area's poorest and most transit-dependent neighborhoods and provide them with subway service. Riots following the death of Martin Luther King in 1968 destroyed much of the commercial district around 14th and U Streets, and planners hoped that adding a subway stop in that area would stimulate redevelopment. The original 1969 plan called for a line under 13th Street NW with just two stations. However, in 1970, the District of Columbia Council agreed to pay an additional $3 million to add a third station and reroute the Green Line under U Street, and 14th Street NW. The southern part of the Green Line was originally planned to pass over the 11th Street Bridges to the intersection of Good Hope Road SE and Martin Luther King, Jr., Avenue SE, follow Martin Luther King, Jr., Avenue SE to Suitland Parkway, down Suitland Parkway to Branch Avenue SE, and down Branch Avenue to a terminus at the intersection of Branch Avenue and the Capital Beltway. Public hearings on whether to build a Green Line and the route it should take were completed in 1973, and portions of the line were originally scheduled to open in 1976. However, construction delays kept the first Green Line stations from opening until 1991.

The downtown segment of the line was originally projected to open in September 1977. Obtaining approval of the District of Columbia and Prince George's County of the exact alignment of the Green Line north of U Street delayed construction. Originally, the ARS called for the line to be placed in the median strip of the planned North Central Freeway, but after that road was cancelled, the route of the replacement subway tunnel became controversial, resulting in years of expensive delays.

The tunnel between the Gallery Place and Waterfront stations, including the junction with the future Yellow Line, was built at the same time as the other Metro tunnels in downtown Washington in the early 1970s. During construction under 7th Street and U Street, where the cut-and-cover technique was used, street traffic and pedestrian access on those streets was difficult. That led to the closure of the traditional retail businesses along the route.

The southern section of the line was not spared from issues, however. The site of Anacostia station, set for the intersection of Martin Luther King, Jr., Avenue SE and Good Hope Road SE, led to concerns that the station would destroy historic Old Anacostia, and after pressure from the federal government, Metro moved the site of the station to Howard Road SE.

By late 1977, Metro had pushed the opening of the Green Line to June 1983. Increasing construction costs and financing problems (caused primarily by the inability of local governments to contribute their share of Metro's funding) led WMATA to consider shifting the Green Line to a more southerly route, along Wheeler Road SE, to terminate near Rosecroft Raceway. Another alternative would have built two Green Lines, one following Wheeler Road SE with a terminus at Southern Avenue and the other following Suitland Parkway to Martin Luther King, Jr., Avenue SE, proceeding northerly along Martin Luther King, Jr., Avenue SE to Good Hope Road SE, and terminating at Good Hope Road SE and Minnesota Avenue SE (then called "Anacostia Station").

In October 1977, WMATA's Board of Directors refused to declare construction of the Green Line a "high priority" (favoring extension of the Red Line to Glenmont) although it instructed Metro staff to work on plans to fund the line and to determine its route. Although the United States Department of Transportation approved the Glenmont extension, federal officials were unhappy that Metro had yet to construct the Green Line into Anacostia.

In January 1978, a WMATA regional task force approved a Green Line route in Anacostia that followed Martin Luther King, Jr., Avenue and then Wheeler Road down to the Beltway, with a new station added near St. Elizabeths Hospital. Nonetheless, the Prince George's County government successfully demanded in May 1978 for WMATA to choose the Suitland Parkway to Rosecroft route instead. In August 1978, WMATA's Board of Directors recommended to the federal government and its partner state and local governments for the entire 100-mile (160 km)-long Metrorail system to be fully built, a proposal that included immediate construction of the Archives, Waterfront, Navy Yard–Ballpark, and Anacostia stations. WMATA announced in November 1978 that it had secured funding to build the Green Line from Gallery Place to Waterfront and that construction was nearly complete on that portion of the line, but that funding did not exist to push the line from Waterfront to Anacostia. Nonetheless, Metro reiterated that it intended to complete the extension by late 1983.

Two additional realignments occurred at the north end of the Green Line but with less acrimony. North of Fort Totten, the line was to have surfaced in the median of the planned North Central Freeway, I-95, and to have proceeded to a point just west of Prince George's Plaza, with an intermediate station at Chillum. I-95 and Metro would have run through the Northwest Branch Stream Valley Park, but the cancellation of I-95 through the District and out to the Beltway in 1974 meant that it was no longer necessary or appropriate to condemn an I-95-sized swath of parkland just for Metro. WMATA eventually selected a new route that skirted most of the park, and it was federally approved by the mid-1980s. The planned Chillum station was relocated and named West Hyattsville. The other alignment dispute occurred in the Petworth section of Washington and involved whether the tunnel would go under or skirt Rock Creek Cemetery and how to go through its soft-soil burial ground (i) and the least disruptive way under New Hampshire Avenue from Georgia Avenue–Petworth to Columbia Heights. The tunnels eventually skirted the cemetery by using the New Austrian tunnelling method and stacked under New Hampshire Avenue.

=== Legal and funding battles ===
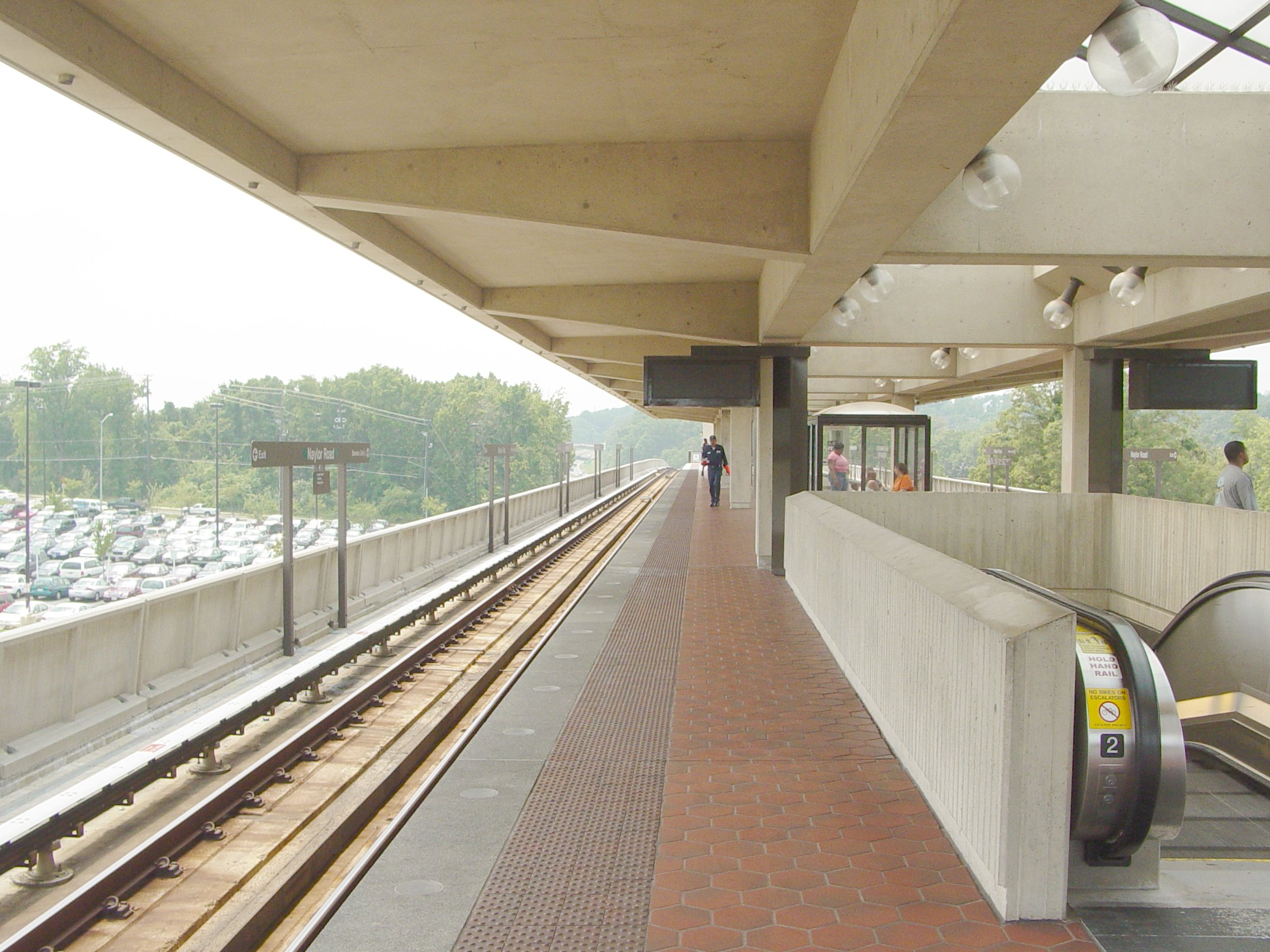
Naylor Road in Prince George's County, MD

In December 1978, Metro announced that the new completion date of the Green Line past the Anacostia station to Rosecroft Raceway would be 1987, a year later than anticipated. Metro also announced that cost considerations had forced it to abandon the high-vault ceiling design for all unbuilt stations (except Navy Yard), and that a less-costly design would be used at all unbuilt Green Line stations. By July 1979, despite the release of billions of dollars in construction funds by the U.S. Department of Transportation, Metro had pushed back the construction of the Anacostia station to mid-1985 and the completion of the Branch Avenue extension to late 1986. But construction schedules continued to slip: despite reaffirming its construction schedules in December 1979, Metro announced in January 1980 that completion of the Green Line terminus in Prince George's County would be pushed back six more months to 1987.

Even as Metro officially designated Rosecroft Raceway as the Green Line's southern terminus, more than half of Prince George's County's representatives in the Maryland state legislature asked Governor Harry Hughes to review the proposed route after allegations of improper political pressure regarding the 1978 route decision surfaced. Metro officials proceeded anyway in March 1984 with Green Line design and planning, and moved the line's completion date up to late 1986.

==== 1980 troubles and near-cancellation ====
Funding troubles delayed construction even further. In March 1980, Maryland officials worried that high inflation would leave Metro without enough funds to complete the Green Line, forcing Maryland to bear these construction costs alone. These fears were confirmed in part in September 1980 when Metro announced that inflation had created a $16 million shortfall in its $271 million budget. By now, Anacostia residents were increasingly angry at the repeated delays in building the Green Line. In September 1980, D.C. City Council member Jerry A. Moore, Jr. delivered a petition containing 1,000 signatures from Anacostia residents demanding that construction on the Green Line be sped up.

In October 1980, The Washington Post ran a major article asking "What Ever Happened to the Green Line?" in which the newspaper concluded: "The 18.86-mile (30.35 kilometer) Green Line, which some argue should have been the first built because it would serve the most disadvantaged sections of the Washington area, is last on the construction list and threatened with extinction." The article confirmed that funds were in place and contracts signed to complete the Green Line to the proposed Anacostia station at Howard Road SE and Martin Luther King, Jr. Avenue SE, but that repeated local opposition in Maryland to the line's actual location had forced planners to delay final siting of the line inside the District of Columbia. Additionally, Maryland businessmen argued that the switch of the terminus from Branch Avenue to Rosecroft Raceway had economically harmed them, and they filed a suit in the United States District Court for the District of Maryland demanding a halt to construction of the Green Line until the line's route could be again reconsidered.

The District of Columbia government responded by threatening to veto any further Metro subway construction unless construction of the Green Line was made Metro's highest priority. Twenty-four hours of intense discussions later, Metro agreed to the District government's wishes. Construction began on the Waterfront station, which was largely complete by January 1981. Once complete, the station was used for storage. By December 1980, Metro was still predicting that the Green Line to Anacostia would open in July 1986, but in January 1981, Metro admitted that the line would not open until at least 1990 because of funding constraints. Two months later, Metro estimated the cost of building the Green Line from U Street NW to Anacostia at $175 million.

==== 1981 ====
Controversies regarding the siting of the Green Line continued. In May 1980, a group of business owners near the former proposed terminus at Branch Avenue and Auth Road near Marlow Heights sued Metro on the grounds that the decision to change the course of the Green Line was illegal because it had been undertaken without a public hearing (in violation of Metro's rules). In February 1981, Judge Norman Park Ramsey of the U.S. District for Maryland held that Metro did not correctly advertise the hearings at which the change would be discussed. Metro appealed the ruling, and Judge Ramsey did not enjoin Metro from proceeding with construction until the appeal was resolved. The Prince George's County government, however, reaffirmed in April 1981 its support for the Rosecroft Raceway terminus, and Metro promised to hold a public hearing on the issue in June 1981. Shortly thereafter, the civil rights office of the U.S. Department of Transportation sent a letter to Metro warning that the Rosecroft Raceway route could negatively impact two historically black communities nearby. In May 1981, Metro changed its estimate for the opening of the Green Line to Anacostia to early 1988.

Prince George's County officials continued to worry that cutbacks in federal funding for mass transit might lead to the cancellation of the four proposed stations in the county (Southern Avenue, Naylor Road, Suitland, and Branch Avenue). Prince George's County officials vetoed in July 1981 any further expenditure of Metro's construction funds unless Metro diverted $100 million from the Red Line extension in Montgomery County to Glenmont and began the immediate purchase of land and rights-of-way in Prince George's County. Metro agreed a month later to the plan, with the provision that $90 million per year would be spent to begin work on the inner-city portion of the Green Line (the Gallery Place, Waterfront, and Navy Yard stations).

Metro held its long-awaited hearings over the Green Line's route in October 1981, but only in Prince George's County (not the District). A month later, the 4th Circuit Court of Appeals turned down Metro's appeal. Metro subsequently estimated on December 9, 1981, that the Green Line would reach Anacostia in late 1989.

==== 1982 ====
Funding problems delayed construction even further. In February 1982, President Ronald Reagan proposed cutting Metro construction funds by 21.4% to just $295 million a year. Planned Green Line construction constituted 40.5% of Metro's construction budget, and the cuts threatened to cancel the entire Green Line. To African American community leaders, the cuts were evidence that Metrorail was meant for suburban white commuters while inner city African Americans were relegated to taking Metrobus. Despite the funding troubles, Metro planned to seek contractors in March 1982 for a $60 million contract to tunnel under the Anacostia River, a $60 million contract to build the Anacostia station, and a $100 million contract to build the Navy Yard station. However, on March 16, 1982, Judge Ramsey barred Metro from spending any money on the construction of the Rosecroft Raceway route for the southern half of the Green Line. The judge held that Metro had decided to shift the Green Line route without properly advertising the public hearings, which the transit system would now be required to hold again, delaying construction of the Green Line and Anacostia station by at least a year. Although Metro had advertised the hearings, Judge Ramsey said, the advertisements contained the same wording flaws that had precipitated the Maryland lawsuit. Metro subsequently scheduled new hearings for June 1982.

Metro officials considered shifting construction funds from the southern Green Line to the northern Green Line in order to start construction on that end of the line, but the D.C. City Council opposed this shift. Metro held the court-ordered hearings in June 1982, at which Prince George's residents argued that they had voted for Metro's 1968 bond issue based on the original Green Line route. Metro promised attendees at the hearing that agency staff would study the Green Line route and issue a report recommending a route, after which construction on the Anacostia River tunnel would begin. The site of the tunnel thus became an issue, with some residents arguing for a tunnel from the Navy Yard under Anacostia Park to Martin Luther King, Jr. Avenue SE, while others wanted the tunnel to take a more northerly route alongside the 11th Street Bridges to Good Hope Road SE. In October 1982, Metro estimated that opening of the Green Line to Anacostia would happen in the "late 1980s", and in November a Metro staff report recommended construction of the Rosecroft Raceway route.

Cuts in federal construction funds for Metro again delayed construction. Metro announced in December 1982 that service on the line would not cross the Anacostia River until late 1989 at the earliest. The federal contribution to Metro's construction fund was lowered to $44 million from $95 million for fiscal 1983, and Metro said that it would divert most of that money to dig tunnels from Gallery Place to Mount Vernon Square. In February 1983, the Reagan administration proposed cutting Metro's construction budget by $145 million to $230 million, which Metro said would push the opening of the Green Line to 1991. On February 11, 1983, Metro, for the first time in its history, formally announced that (absent full construction funding) it could not build the Green Line, the Red Line from Wheaton to Glenmont, or the Yellow Line from Franconia–Springfield to King Street–Old Town.

==== Anacostia terminus ====
As Metro struggled to secure construction funding for the Green Line and Anacostia station, it also struggled to lift the district court's injunction on Green Line construction. Metro asked the court to allow construction of the Navy Yard, Anacostia, and Congress Heights stations pending a decision on the Green Line route in Prince George's County, but the court refused. Judge Ramsey said that Metro's public hearing process was biased and "inadequate". Even as the court refused to let Green Line construction in Anacostia begin, more than 23,000 Anacostia residents signed a public petition demanding that the line be built. Metro declined to appeal Judge Ramsey's latest ruling, and the Prince George's County Council voted to reverse its earlier decision and support the original Green Line route to Branch Avenue.

Frustrated by funding constraints and the court injunction, in December 1983 Metro released a proposed "final" system map that showed the Green Line terminating at the Anacostia and Mount Vernon Square stations.

=== Resolution of controversies ===
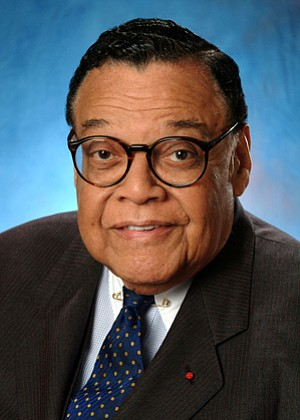
William T. Coleman, civil rights attorney and former Ford administration Cabinet official, helped break the funding impasse.

In 1984, Metro undertook two steps to secure completion of the Green Line. First, the transit agency hired former U.S. Secretary of Transportation William T. Coleman, Jr. in December 1983 to oversee negotiations with the various entities involved with the siting of the Green Line route and seek a resolution through the U.S. district court. On February 21, 1984, Prince George's County Executive Parris Glendening announced that construction of the Green Line in Prince George's must start by September 30, 1984, or he would begin vetoing Metro spending proposals. At the same time, Metro and Coleman opened negotiations to build the Green Line from the L'Enfant Plaza Station to Anacostia. Advocates of the Rosecroft route, however, warned that they would sue if Metro switched back to the original route.

Just four days later, Metro, D.C. and Prince George's County officials, reached an agreement with advocates of both the Branch Avenue and Rosecroft routes to begin construction from L'Enfant Plaza to Anacostia, pending resolution of the line's final route by December 6, 1984. The agreement called for construction of the Green Line to Waterfront station in the summer, siting of the tunnel under the Anacostia River by June 28, and the holding of public hearings on the remaining route between July 18 and August 3. The U.S. Federal District Court approved the agreement on March 7. Following the ruling, Metro announced that it would build the Anacostia station on Howard Road between Martin Luther King, Jr. Avenue SE and the Anacostia Freeway, as well as a new Metro station at the Washington Navy Yard, and would open the Green Line by 1990. Metro asked and won approval from the court to build the Navy Yard and Anacostia stations and the tunnel in June 1984.

Metro also began new political efforts to secure funding to complete the transit system. Initially, Reagan administration officials balked at this plan, reiterating that they would not permit Metro to build more than 76.4 miles (123.0 km) of subway. But in June, House and Senate committees passed legislation requiring the Reagan administration to release all funds appropriated for Metro, putting pressure on the administration to rescind its mileage limit.

=== Bus controversy ===
Like all Metrorail stations, Anacostia station was intended to be a major hub for Metrobus service in the area. However, with the Anacostia neighborhood being the poorest and most transit-dependent area in the District of Columbia, changes to bus routes in the area proved highly controversial. As the opening of the Green Line to Anacostia neared, WMATA proposed halving the number of bus routes traveling between Anacostia and the National Archives Building downtown. That would force riders to take the more expensive Metrorail and require many riders to walk several blocks to their destination, rather than the "virtually door-to-door service" that they enjoyed. A total of 25 routes were changed, affecting more than 80,000 riders.

Many of the new routes now terminated at the Anacostia station, rather than continuing into downtown Washington. WMATA officials admitted that fares for most Anacostia residents would rise an average of 50% and that Anacostia residents would be forced to pay more and travel farther to access the services (such as doctors) and shopping that most District residents can readily access. To help mediate the impact of the total fare increase on Anacostia residents, WMATA reduced basic bus fares for many routes in the area from $1 to 35 cents.

==== Protests and boycott ====
District residents protested the route cuts with a picket line in front of WMATA's downtown headquarters in August 1991. Prince George's County residents were also angered by the changes. They argued that Metro had promised more, not less, bus service and complained that they would be forced to use a rail station located in the District of Columbia's most violent and crime-prone neighborhood. More than 1,000 people packed "raucous" public hearings for three nights in the District and Prince George's County in early September that denounced Metro and claimed that they were "becoming a victim of transportational apartheid." Worried about the impact of the cuts as well as a possible bus boycott, D.C. Mayor Sharon Pratt Kelly (later Sharon Pratt Dixon) announced on September 11, 1991, that she would seek an alternative to the changes proposed by WMATA. Suburban commuters were angry that Metro would keep the bus routes open in Anacostia, at an estimated cost of $4 million, when their bus service had been cut when Metrorail stations opened in their areas; D.C. residents countered that poor African American District citizens could not afford the same transit changes and fare increases that wealthy, white suburbanites were asked to absorb.

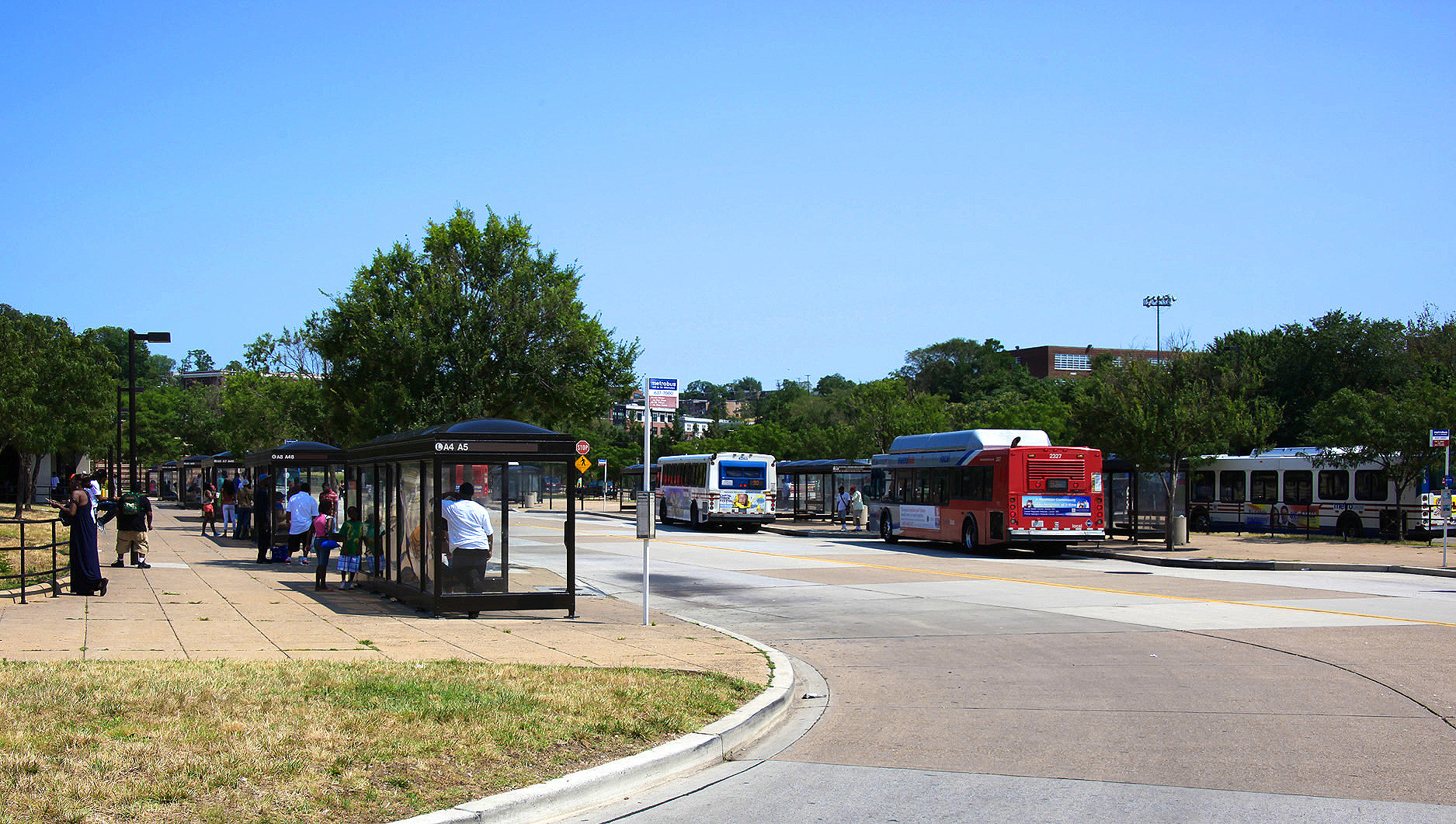
Extensive bus bays (depicted) were added to the Anacostia station to accommodate Prince George's County buses that never serviced the station.

Calls for a boycott increased in mid-September. On September 16, 1991, declaring that the city paid "40 percent of the Metro subsidy, but we're the last to get service," Mayor Dixon threatened to withhold the District's payment to Metro unless the bus changes were rescinded. Metro officials were angered by Dixon's statement and said that District officials had been involved in the bus route planning process for months. Mayor Dixon proposed on September 20 for Metro to continue to use Anacostia station as a hub but with bus service provided into downtown D.C. The plan, estimated to cost less than $500,000 a year, would require residents to transfer at Anacostia station but would not raise the total fare to more than $1. A month later, Metro's board of directors unanimously agreed to accept Dixon's plan and cancelled all planned route changes in the District of Columbia and Prince George's County. The cost of operating the bus routes totaled $2.5 million annually. The compromise led residents to call off their boycott of Metrobus.

Prince George's County, meanwhile, had announced that its county-run buses ("The Bus") would not run to Anacostia Station, as previously promised, drawing outrage from the D.C. representatives on Metro's board. The District of Columbia had spent more than $20 million adding bus bays at the station to accommodate The Bus arrivals.

==== Fare loss ====
Two months after the Anacostia station opened, WMATA said that a study of bus and rail ridership showed that the unaltered bus routes were costing the transit agency $200,000 a month in lost rail fares. To make up the lost revenue, WMATA said that it would run only two-car trains (the shortest on the system) on the Green Line during slow periods on weekdays and evenings and on Sundays beginning in June 1992. In November 1992, WMATA reported that ridership at the Anacostia station was (on average) 7,500 riders a day, 700 below estimates. WMATA admitted that although riders had made the switch from bus to rail, the lower ridership numbers were caused by the recession, not because of continuing downtown bus service in the area. Metro said ridership on buses in the neighborhood was down significantly, and the transit agency reduced the number of buses on some routes to avoid having empty buses.

=== Rail car shortage ===
WMATA first became aware of a rail car shortage in 1988. Although the transit authority knew that it needed at least 98 new rail cars to provide adequate service to the new stations to be added on the Green Line and other lines by 1993, it did not place an order for the cars. Metrorail also suffered from internal squabbling over rail car design, and rail car production had historically been plagued by poor quality and labor strikes—both of which added to construction delays. By September 1990, more frequent breakdowns in the existing, aging rail car fleet heightened the urgency to buy more cars. Officials estimated that the rail car shortage would become critical when the Anacostia station opened. When the Van Dorn Street station opened in June 1991, Metro was forced to run trains every 12 minutes during rush hour rather than every 8 due to the rail car shortage. Eventually, crowding was addressed when additional cars became available by running 8-car trains.

Metro also encountered significant problems estimating the number of riders who would board the system at the Anacostia and other Green Line stations. In June 1991, WMATA estimated that just over 15,000 riders on average would board at the Waterfront, Navy Yard, and Anacostia stations. In December 1991, when the Anacostia station opened, Metro had revised that number to 30,700 riders per day (by June 1992). Just a week later, Metro dropped that estimate to only 28,000 riders a day (by June 1992).

Even though significant numbers of bus riders in Anacostia had switched to Metrorail by February 1992, WMATA nonetheless began running two- rather than four-car trains on the Green Line on Sundays and during slow periods in order to close a revenue shortfall.

Metro finally ordered new rail cars, but the first of the cars were not due to be delivered until February 2001.

The January 13, 2001 opening of the final five Green Line stations (Congress Heights, Southern Avenue, Naylor Road, Suitland, and Branch Avenue) significantly worsened overcrowding and service problems on the line. The five new stations added almost 20,000 new riders a day, overwhelming station platforms, jamming trains to capacity, and forcing many riders at Anacostia and other stations up the line to wait as train after train passed them, filled. Metro had estimated that 18,000 riders a day would board from these stations by June 2001. That estimate was exceeded by 2,000 riders a day on the second day the stations were open.

By January 24, the number had risen to more than 30,600 per day, three times as many as originally estimated. Angry commuters using the Anacostia, Navy Yard, and Waterfront stations peppered the transit agency with complaints. WMATA claimed that a number of factors contributed to the ridership crunch: the system was experiencing record ridership; two-year-old ridership projections were used; the five stations were opened two months ahead of schedule; the five new stations were opened two months before new rail cars were ready for service; and WMATA offered free parking at the Green Line stations, which drew 12,000 rather than 4,000 riders to the line.

== Construction and opening ==
=== 1984 ===
Construction of the Green Line south from L'Enfant Plaza began in July 1984 when WMATA issued a call for bids to tunnel under the Anacostia River. The firm of Harrison Western/Franki-Denys (a joint venture) was awarded the $25.6 million contract, with construction to begin in December 1984. WMATA delayed awarding the contract after American anti-apartheid activists alleged that a Belgian company with a minority financial interest in Franki-Denys did business with the racist white-led government of South Africa, but after the links were discovered to be extremely minor the contract was awarded.

The debate over the route for the remainder of the Green Line was finally resolved in December 1984. Residents and D.C. government officials asked WMATA to build stations at Congress Heights and Southern Avenue in order to promote economic development and provide service to St. Elizabeths Hospital and Greater Southeast Community Hospital. In December 1984, WMATA's Board of Directors agreed to return the Green Line to its original route, and build the Congress Heights and Southern Avenue stations. The U.S. district court approved WMATA's decision and dissolved its March 1982 injunction, which had barred construction of the $483 million southern Green Line (now estimated to cost $132 million more than the Rosecroft route).

=== 1985 ===
Funding for Green Line construction fell into place in 1985. Pressured by the previous year's Congressional action, the Reagan administration sought to provide WMATA with $250 million a year for four years to expand the system to 89.5 miles (144.0 km), a plan which would not fund construction of the system beyond the proposed Southern Avenue station.

Construction on the line started in 1985. Survey and clearing work for the twin 2,500-foot (762 m) Anacostia River tunnels began in March 1985. A 24-foot (7.32 m) long, 19 foot (5.8 m) diameter tunnel boring machine built by the Hitachi Zosen Corporation was shipped to the U.S. to drill the tunnel, which required boring techniques "so novel that they have never before been used in the eastern United States." The tunnel boring machine ate through "T5" (relatively fine sand mixed with gravel and boulders which occasionally required workers to physically break the boulders apart) and clay formations about 50 feet (15 m) beneath the riverbed. The walls of the tunnel were lined with concrete as the machine moved. Liquid nitrogen was used to harden the ground where the inbound tunnel reached the northern side of the Anacostia River, to lessen the possibility of cave-ins due to the wet earth.

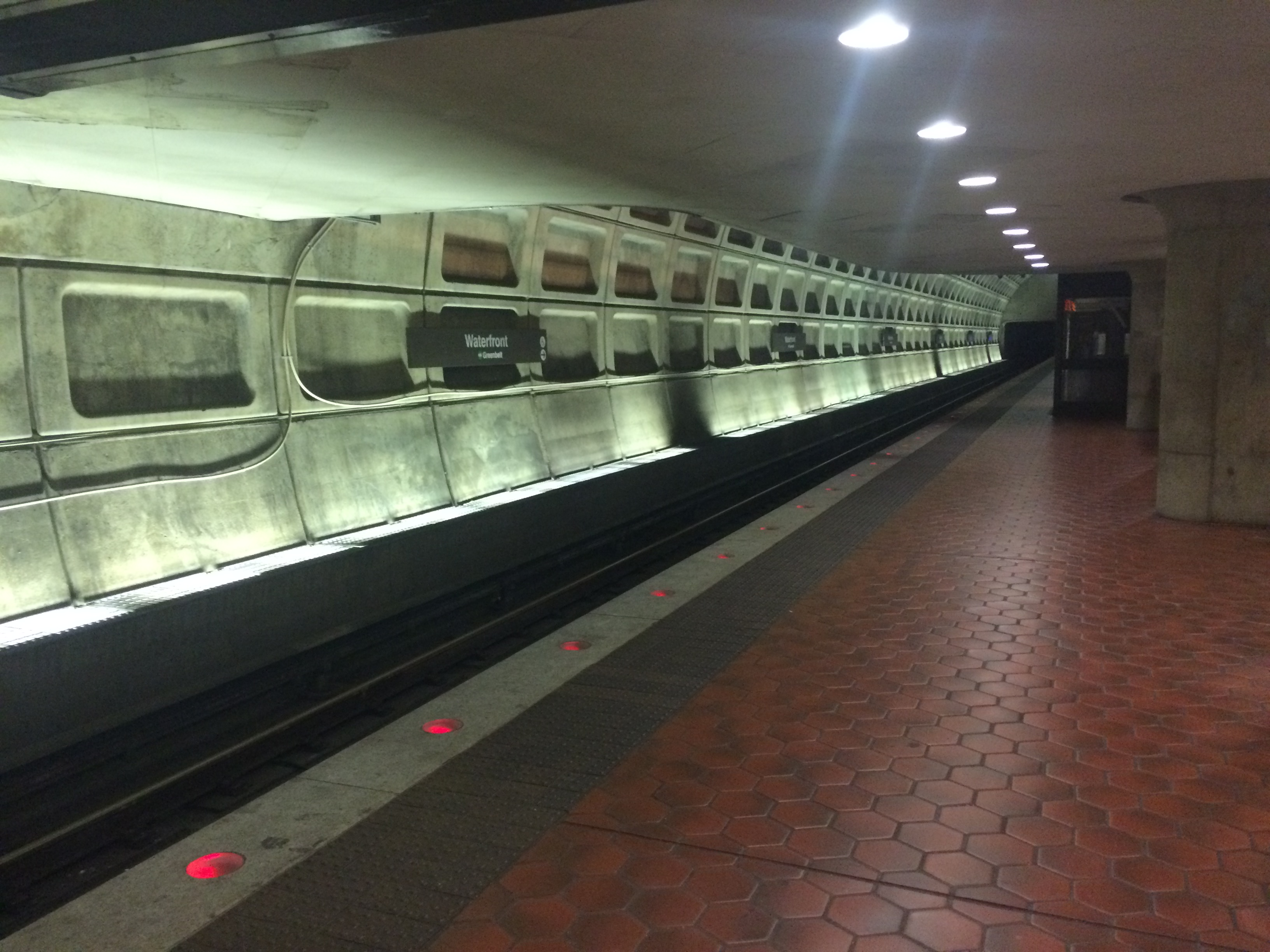
Waterfront Metro station was mothballed during the construction controversy over the Green Line.

The completion date for the two tunnels was estimated at late 1987. WMATA engineers also inspected the mothballed Waterfront station and found it to be still structurally sound (although water needed to be pumped from the station). However, some repairs to the tunnel between L'Enfant Plaza and Waterfront needed to be made. Construction of the tunnel from Waterfront to Navy Yard was set to begin in September 1985, construction of the Navy Yard station in early 1986, and linkage with the Anacostia River tunnels shortly thereafter. The two new Green Line stations were expected to open in 1990. In October 1985, WMATA awarded the $24.9 million contract to excavate the tunnel between the Waterfront and Navy Yard stations to Harrison Western Corp. WMATA's board awarded a $41.5 million contract for the construction of the Anacostia station to Kiewit Construction Co. in June 1985, and said the station would open in 1990. Ground was broken at the site on September 21, 1985.

=== 1986–88 ===
Funding for construction of the Green Line was threatened again in 1986. WMATA needed $2 billion in construction funds, but Congress was threatening to cut WMATA's funding by up to 26% to $184.5 million a year for four years. Congress approved $227 million for 1986 in December 1985, but the Reagan administration said that it would cut off all funding thereafter. WMATA appealed directly to President Reagan to release $400 million in funds already appropriated, but administration officials said WMATA had more than enough money to complete the Green Line. Prince George's County officials threatened to sue Metro as well as block all further construction spending in March 1985 unless WMATA agreed to use its existing funds to build the Green Line into their county. WMATA officials reacted in June by stretching out construction of the Green Line and Anacostia station to 1991. After lengthy negotiations (which included state and local guarantees to pay for cost overruns or funding shortfalls, penalties for defaults, and the imposition of two external financial monitors) and heavy pressure from Congress, Reagan administration officials released the $400 million on July 16, 1986.

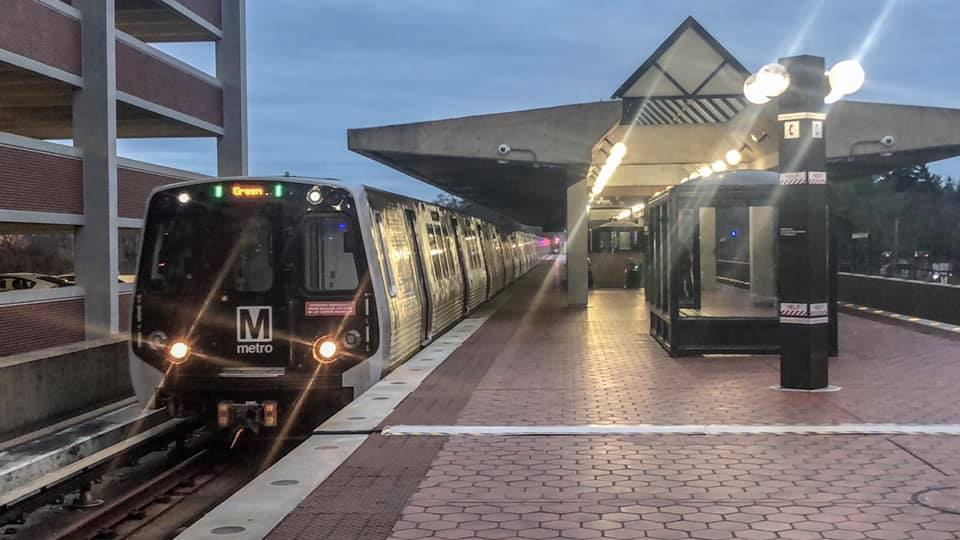
College Park station opened on December 11, 1993

With the funds released, construction on the Green Line proceeded quickly. In November 1986, WMATA awarded a $36.2 million contract to Mergentime Corp. to build the Navy Yard station. A month later, WMATA awarded a $19.5 million contract to excavate a tunnel from the Navy Yard Station to the tunnels being built under the Anacostia River. On March 23, 1986, the second of the two 2,450-foot (750 m), concrete-lined tunnels under the Anacostia River was completed. With the tunnels finished and other contracts awarded, WMATA announced yet another revised timeline for opening the Green Line in April 1987. The transit agency estimated that the Mount Vernon Square, Shaw, and U Street stations would open in late 1990, the Mount Vernon Square to Anacostia link in late 1991, and the Fort Totten to Greenbelt link by 1994. In January 1988, WMATA awarded a $179.1 million contract to build the Green Line from Fort Totten to Greenbelt, and a $6.9 million contract to complete the Waterfront station. In December 1988, WMATA reaffirmed that the Waterfront, Navy Yard, and Anacostia stations would open in late 1991.

=== Extension south of Anacostia ===
Beginning in 1989, WMATA sought funding to extend the Green Line beyond the Anacostia station and to operate the Green Line. Metro asked Congress to authorize $2.16 billion over 10 years to complete the 103-mile (166 km) system, as well as appropriate the remaining $193 million from the transit agency's original 1980 authorization to complete the Green Line from Anacostia to Branch Avenue and link the Green Line internally between U Street and Fort Totten. Although the Bush administration opposed the request, Congress provided $2.025 billion. Only the stations at Suitland and Branch Avenue remained unfunded.

By mid-1991, however, falling inflation had reduced WMATA's construction costs so much that the agency said it could build the two final Green Line stations in Prince George's County without asking Congress for additional money. WMATA also proposed spending money almost three times faster up-front to accelerate its construction schedule, a move which would be more than compensated for by savings in out-years. Prince George's County officials threatened to block all further Metrorail construction unless they received guarantees that the stations in their county would be built. Funding for the remaining seven Green Line stations in the District and Prince George's remained in doubt as of August 1991, with District officials saying that it made sense to build the Georgia Avenue–Petworth and Columbia Heights stations and Prince George's representatives demanding that the three stations in their county be completed. WMATA said that it had so little money it could not fund 16 critical small construction projects, among them security gates at the Navy Yard and Waterfront stations and parts for escalators at the seven new Green Line stations in D.C. and Prince George's County. The funding impasse was broken in November 1991 when local and state governments agreed to roughly triple their contribution to Metro's construction costs by 1994 to complete the entire system.

The first WMATA budget which contained funds for operating the Green Line was proposed in December 1989. The budget presumed a December 1, 1990, opening for the Mt. Vernon Square, Shaw–Howard University and U Street–Cardozo stations, and requested funds to test the soon-to-open Green Line from Gallery Place–Chinatown to the Anacostia station. The budget also projected that this section of the line would open in 1991, and that new Metrobus service will be added in Prince George's County to bring commuters to the new station.

=== Opening delays ===
==== Change of contractor ====
The opening of the Green Line was significantly delayed, however, when in May 1990 WMATA fired the contractor building the Shaw–Howard University and U Street–Cardozo stations. Mergentime/Perini Joint Venture, the contractor working on the stations, had violated its contract with WMATA by reducing the workforce on the project, not meeting project deadlines, and permitting unsafe working conditions to persist. Mergentime/Perini denied the accusations. Although similar problems plagued Mergentime/Perini's work on the Navy Yard station, WMATA did not fire the joint venture company from that project. WMATA said that the problems would delay the Green Line's opening until at least the late spring of 1991.

In August 1990, WMATA hired the Perini Corp. as the new contractor, and required the company to finish the job and rebuild the streets in the area, setting a new Green Line dedication of December 1991. Federal monitors overseeing WMATA's spending, however, issued a report in August 1990 accusing WMATA of poor financial oversight of the project and blamed the transit agency for the delays and problems Mergentime/Perini confronted. Mergentime/Perini sued WMATA, claiming that it was improperly dismissed from the project.

==== Other problems ====
The cost of testing and operating the Green Line left WMATA struggling financially. These costs (along with costs associated with extending and operating the Blue Line to Van Dorn Street) forced WMATA to cut 335 jobs as well as supplies, travel, overtime, and temporary employee budgets. Although ridership was projected to rise 3.8% to 260 million trips in the coming year, the increased revenue was not expected to cover the costs of operating the new lines and stations. Mount Vernon Square, Shaw–Howard University, and U Street–Cardozo stations opened on Saturday, May 11, 1991.

Construction of the Green Line past Anacostia station was complicated by the discovery of a potential toxic waste site in the path of the subway. In June 1991, WMATA discovered that the District of Columbia had dumped 426,000 tons of possibly hazardous incinerator bottom ash in an unused exposed culvert along the subway's potential path near St. Elizabeth's Hospital between 1977 and 1989. The city continued to dump the ash at the site for four years after it learned that WMATA planned to use the site for the Green Line. Experts were concerned that the ash dump contained pockets of methane gas and soluble acid, which would make the site unusable by Metrorail.

Maryland officials used the discovery to press yet again for realignment of the Green Line and abandonment of the planned stations at Congress Heights and Southern Avenue in favor of construction of the stations at Naylor Road, Suitland, and Branch Avenue. The proposal led to public protests against the Maryland plan in Anacostia, and heated arguments on the WMATA board of directors. In an initial report in June 1991, WMATA determined that ash posed no environmental risk, although there were concerns that the level of pollutants would prevent any excavated material from being accepted by landfills in D.C., Maryland, or Virginia. A final environmental report in November 1991 found that the ash was not hazardous, but would need to be removed at a cost of $1 million.

=== 1991 extension ===
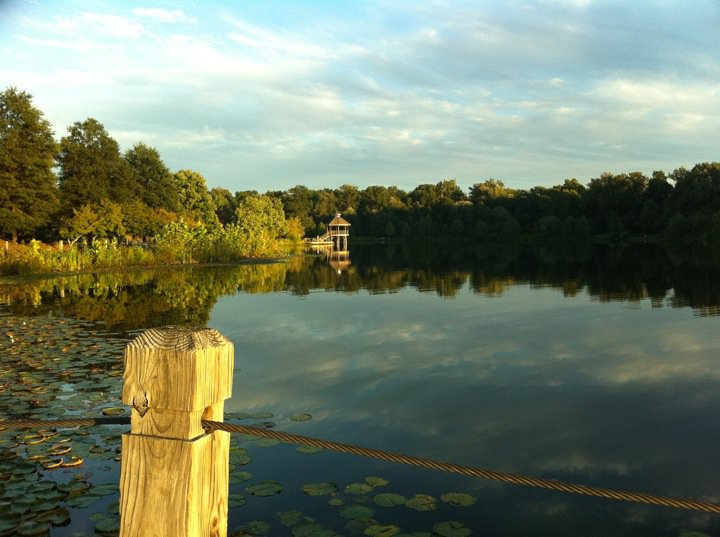
Lake Artemesia was created when WMATA mined sand and gravel at this location to build the Green Line.

The Green Line from L'Enfant Plaza to Anacostia opened as scheduled on December 28, 1991. Ridership expanded rapidly on the Green Line. In the first workweek of the year, more than 8,000 riders a day boarded at the three stations in Southeast D.C. (more than 5,000 of them at Anacostia), exceeding WMATA's estimates, and nearly 10,000 riders were boarding each day at the three stations by the third week of January.

Construction of the Green Line near Berwyn Heights, Maryland resulted in the creation of Lake Artemesia. In 1976, WMATA removed sand and gravel needed for construction from open space adjacent to the Green Line. In exchange, WMATA paid to develop the area as a lake surrounded by a park.

=== 1993 extension ===
The Greenbelt, College Park, Prince George's Plaza, and West Hyattsville stations opened in December 1993. Almost two years later, WMATA broke ground on the Suitland, Naylor Road, Southern Avenue, and Congress Heights stations, a $900 million project which would complete the final 6.5 miles (10.5 km) of the originally-planned 103-mile (165.8 km) Metrorail system in late 1999. The outbound tunnel to Congress Heights was completed in June 1998. The Georgia Avenue–Petworth and Columbia Heights stations were completed in September 1999, three months ahead of schedule. The Green Line's final five stations opened on January 13, 2001.

=== Recent years ===
Service on the Green Line tracks began on May 11, 1991 on three stations between U Street and Gallery Place–Chinatown. Initially, all trains through this section were run as Yellow Line trains terminating at Huntington. The Green Line formally began on December 28, 1991, with three stations south of L'Enfant Plaza to Anacostia. At this time, Yellow Line service north of Mount Vernon Square was discontinued and those stations were served only by the new Green Line. The four-station branch north of Fort Totten to Greenbelt opened on December 11, 1993. The two segments were connected on September 18, 1999, with two stations opening, and the last five stations south to Branch Avenue opened on January 13, 2001, completing the original 101-mile (163 km) Metrorail system.

After the branch north of Fort Totten opened, the Green Line Commuter Shortcut began as a six-month experiment on January 27, 1997, allowing passengers to get on a train on the Green Line segment during rush hours and travel as far as Farragut North on the Red Line without having to switch trains at Fort Totten; a transfer was needed during off-peak hours. This was accomplished by utilizing a single-track spur (B & E connection) between the Green and Red Lines near (and bypassing) Fort Totten station. This shortcut was so well-received that it was continued until September 17, 1999, when the mid-city portion of the Green Line was completed.

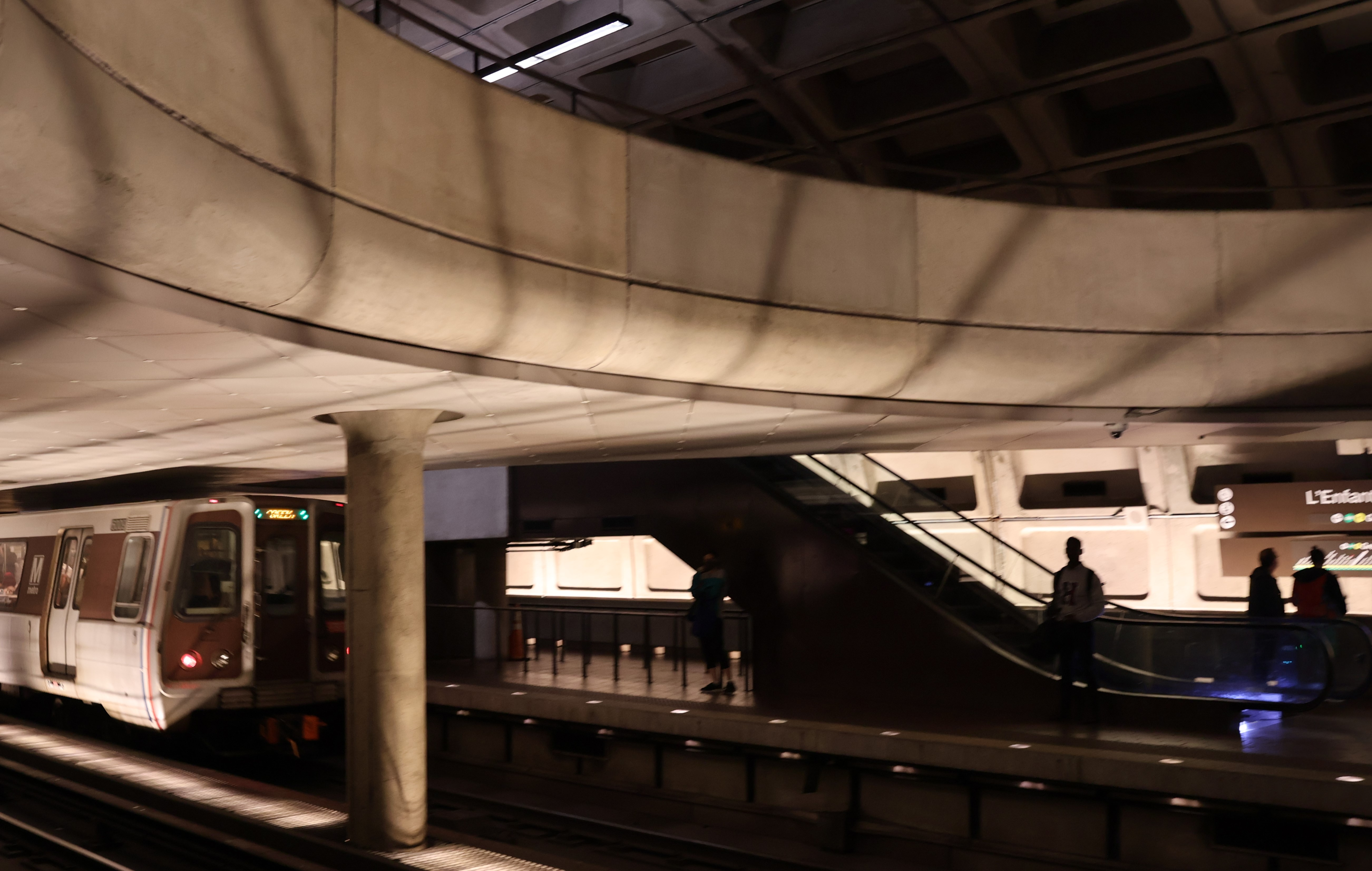
Northbound Green Line train departing L'Enfant Plaza in September 2023.

In 2006, WMATA board member Jim Graham and D.C. Mayor Anthony A. Williams proposed re-extending Yellow Line service to Fort Totten or even to Greenbelt, (which was the originally planned northern terminus for the line). Their proposal did not involve construction of any new track, because either extension would run along the same route as the existing Green Line and would thus relieve crowding on that line. Suburban members of the board initially resisted the proposal. Through a compromise that also increased service on the Red Line, on April 20, 2006 the WMATA board approved a Yellow Line extension to the Fort Totten station during off-peak hours. An 18-month pilot program began on December 31, 2006, at a cost of $5.75 million to the District of Columbia. At the end of the pilot, the program was extended and as of April 2019, is operational today.

From March 26, 2020 until June 28, 2020, trains were bypassing Archives, Mount Vernon Square, and College Park–University of Maryland stations due to the 2020 coronavirus pandemic. All stations were reopened beginning on June 28, 2020.

Between May 29 to September 6, 2021, all Green Line trains terminated at Fort Totten due to the Platform Improvement Project which closed stations north of Fort Totten. Shuttle buses were provided to the closed stations.

Between July 22 to September 4, 2023, all Green Line trains terminated at Fort Totten to improve rail system technologies on the closed stations north of Fort Totten. Automatic train operation on the Yellow and Green lines, which had ceased following the 2009 Red Line train collision, was allowed to resume in May 2025.

== Route ==
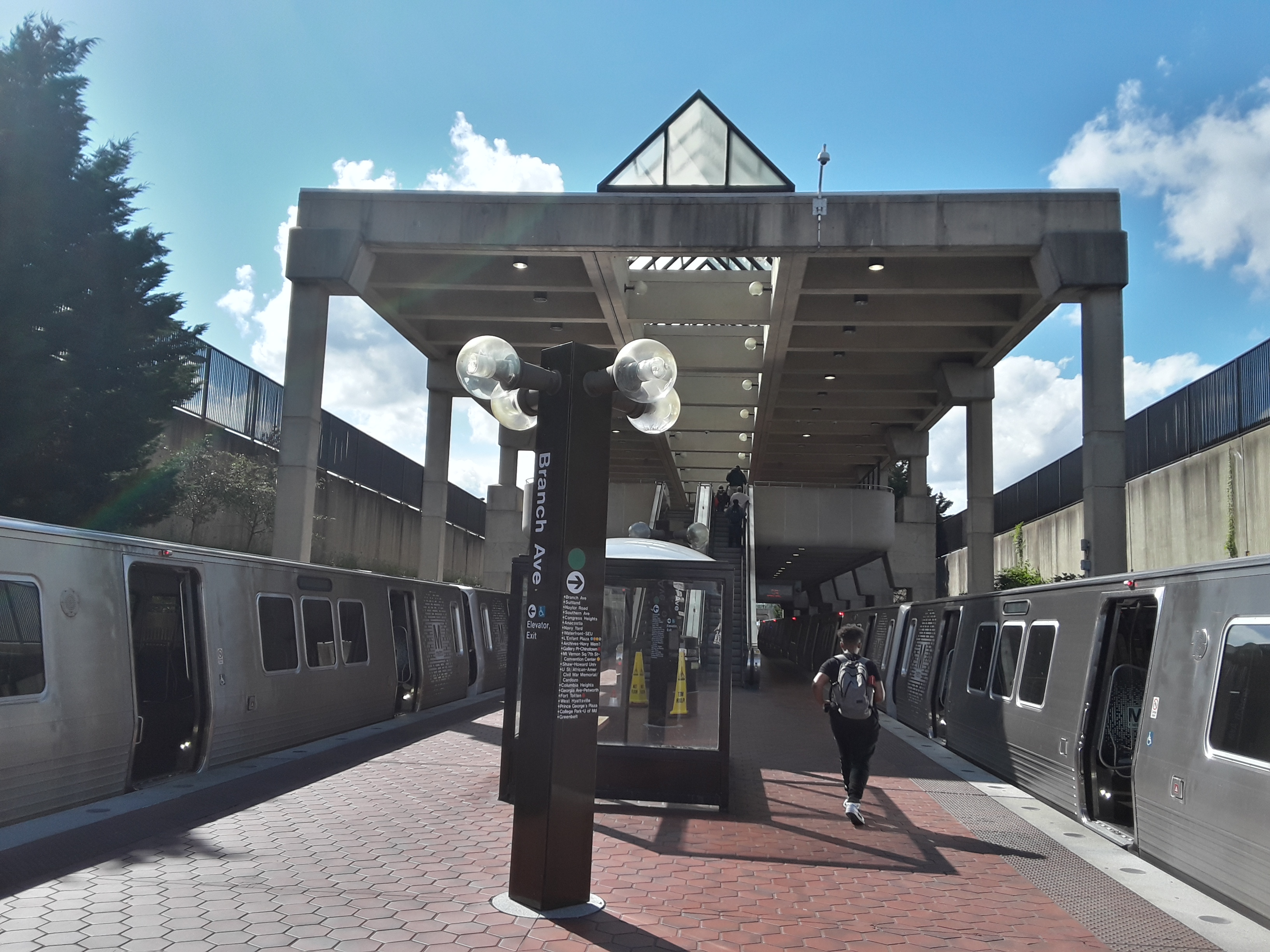
Branch Avenue, the southern terminus of the line

The southern terminus of the Green Line is in Prince George’s County and near the intersection of Branch Avenue (Maryland Route 5) and Auth Way, just inside the Capital Beltway near Andrews Air Force Base. The route goes northwest through a park to join the right of way of the Suitland Parkway. It veers southeast along Southern Avenue SE and then north on 13th Street SE to rejoin Suitland Parkway. The line then crosses the Anacostia River and tunnels under the Washington Navy Yard and travels west under M Street SE.

It then joins the Yellow Line in a tunnel under 7th Street SW just before L'Enfant Plaza while both lines go over the Blue, Orange and Silver lines. The tunnel goes through Chinatown, where they intersect with the Red Line from below at Gallery Place–Chinatown. The lines then bend west along Florida Avenue NW and U Street NW and then turns north under Park Road NW and 14th Street NW. The tunnel turns northeast under New Hampshire Avenue NW and across Fort Totten Park, crossing underneath the Red Line at Fort Totten. The Green Line then re-enters Prince George’s County with the Yellow Line and both lines continue to run east through Fort Circle Park and tunnels under Queens Chapel Road (Maryland Route 500) to emerge along the Baltimore and Ohio Railroad right of way parallel to MARC as both lines approach Greenbelt adjacent to the Capital Beltway.

Internally, the Green Line is known as the Greenbelt Route (E) and the Branch Avenue Route (F), which meet at the center of the lower level platform of Gallery Place (whose Remote Terminal Unit (RTU) code is F01, the first station on the Branch Avenue Route).

Along with the Red Line, the Green Line is one of two Metro lines that does not enter Virginia. It is the only Metro line to run entirely inside the Capital Beltway.

The Green Line requires 19 trains (10 eight-car trains and nine six-car trains, consisting of 134 rail cars) to run at peak capacity. There are rail yard facilities near the Branch Ave and Greenbelt stations.

As of March 2018, all Green Line trains were required to only run 8-car trains. However Green Line trains began operating 6-car trains again in summer 2019, and full time by September 2022.

== Stations ==
The following stations are on the Green Line. They are listed from south to north.

Station	Code	Opened	Image	Rail connections
Branch Avenue	F11	January 13, 2001		
Suitland	F10	January 13, 2001		
Naylor Road	F09	January 13, 2001		
Southern Avenue	F08	January 13, 2001		
Congress Heights	F07	January 13, 2001		
Anacostia	F06	December 28, 1991		
Navy Yard–Ballpark	F05	December 28, 1991		
Waterfront	F04	December 28, 1991		
L'Enfant Plaza	F03	July 1, 1977		Yellow Line; Orange Line; Silver Line; Blue Line; Virginia Railway Express (at L'Enfant)
Archives	F02	April 30, 1983		Yellow Line
Gallery Place	F01	December 15, 1976		Red Line; Yellow Line
Mount Vernon Square	E01	May 11, 1991		Yellow Line
Shaw–Howard University	E02	May 11, 1991		Yellow Line
U Street	E03	May 11, 1991		Yellow Line
Columbia Heights	E04	September 18, 1999		Yellow Line
Georgia Avenue–Petworth	E05	September 18, 1999		Yellow Line
Fort Totten	E06	December 11, 1993		Red Line; Yellow Line
West Hyattsville	E07	December 11, 1993		Yellow Line
Hyattsville Crossing (Note: Originally opened as Prince George’s Plaza, renamed in 2022.)	E08	December 11, 1993		Yellow Line
College Park–University of Maryland	E09	December 11, 1993		Yellow Line; Purple Line (planned); MARC: ■ Camden Line
Greenbelt	E10	December 11, 1993		Yellow Line; MARC: ■ Camden Line

== Future ==
A proposed extension from the line's Greenbelt terminus to Baltimore/Washington International Airport has been studied. This expansion, which would also serve the Laurel and Fort Meade areas of central Maryland, would link the Washington Metro system to the Baltimore Light RailLink of the Maryland Transit Administration.

== See also ==
- List of Washington Metro stations

== Bibliography ==
- Albanese, Jay S. Criminal Justice, 2000 Update. Boston: Allyn & Bacon, 1999. ISBN 0-205-31884-3
- Banks, James G. The Unintended Consequences: Family and Community, the Victims of Isolated Poverty. Lanham, Md.: University Press of America, 2004. ISBN 0-7618-2857-5
- Edleson, Harriet and Lindroth, David. The Little Black Book of Washington, DC: The Essential Guide to America's Capital. White Plains, N.Y.: Peter Pauper Press, 2007. ISBN 1-59359-868-8
- La Vigne, Nancy G. "Safe Transport: Security By Design on the Washington Metro." In Preventing Mass Transit Crime. Ronald V. Clarke, ed. Monsey, N.Y.: Criminal Justice Press, 2002. ISBN 1-881798-28-3
- Schrag, Zachary. The Great Society Subway: A History of the Washington Metro. Baltimore, Md.: Johns Hopkins University, 2006. ISBN 0-8018-8246-X
