= Waterfront station (Washington Metro) =

Washington Metro station

Coordinates: 38.876484°N 77.017186°W

Waterfront
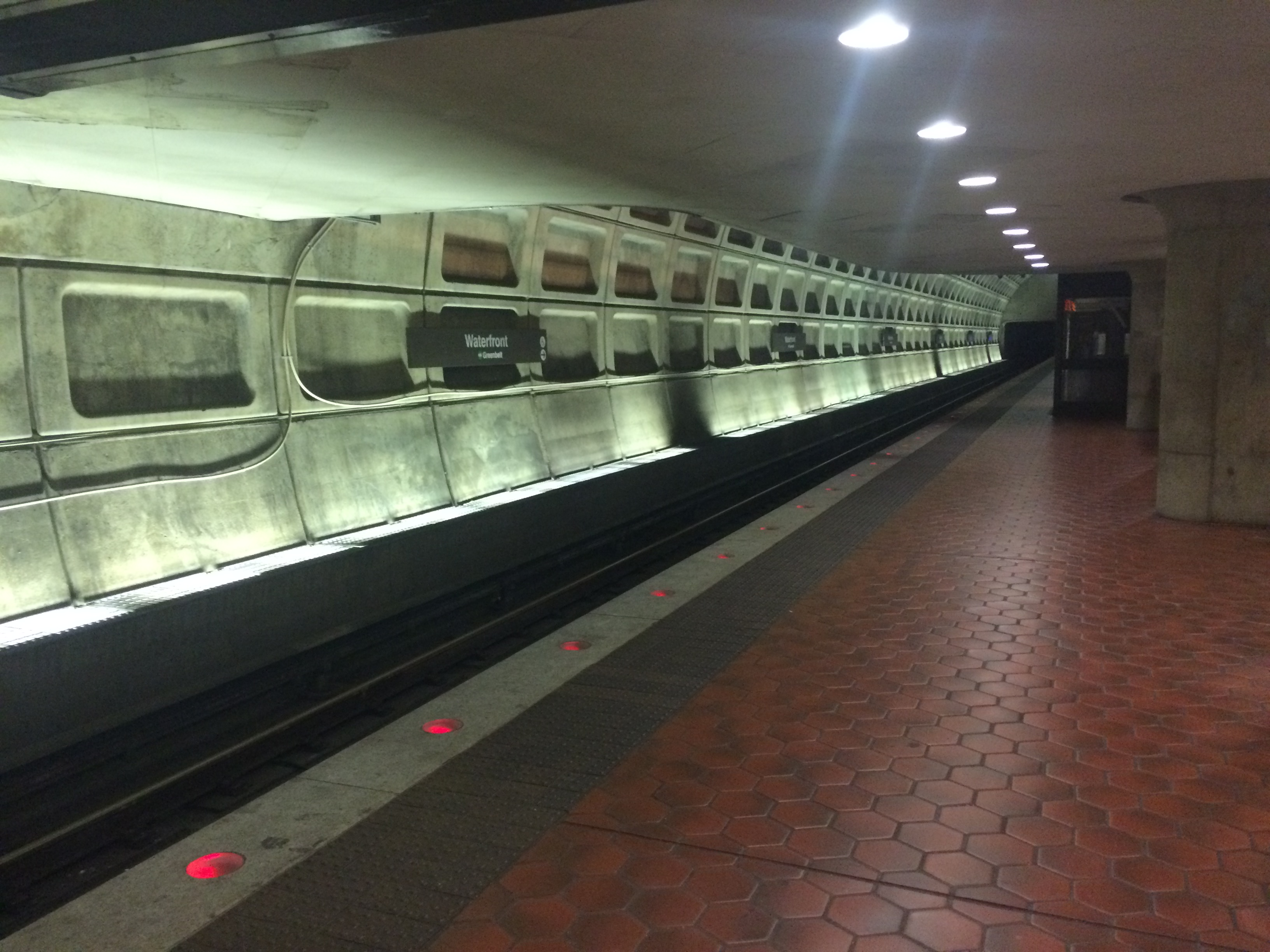
- Waterfront station platform in September 2016

General information
- Location: 399 M Street SW; Washington, D.C.
- Owner: Washington Metropolitan Area Transit Authority
- Platforms: 1 island platform
- Tracks: 2
- Connections: Metrobus: C11, C55, D50; MTA Maryland Commuter Bus; OmniRide Commuter; Loudoun County Transit

Construction
- Structure type: Underground
- Cycle facilities: Capital Bikeshare, 10 racks and 12 lockers
- Accessible: Yes

Other information
- Station code: F04

History
- Opened: December 28, 1991; 34 years ago
- Former names: Waterfront (1991–1997); Waterfront–SEU (1997–2011)

Passengers
- 2025: 4,526 (average weekday)
- Rank: 37 of 98

Services
Preceding station	Washington Metro	Following station
Navy Yard–Ballpark toward Branch Avenue	Green Line	L'Enfant Plaza toward Greenbelt
Route map
Location

Waterfront station (known as Waterfront–SEU from 1997 to 2011) is a Washington Metro station on the Green Line in the Southwest Waterfront neighborhood of Washington, D.C., United States. The station was opened on December 28, 1991, and is operated by the Washington Metropolitan Area Transit Authority (WMATA). Waterfront is located at the intersection of 4th and M Streets SW.

== Notable places nearby ==
- Arena Stage
- Fort Lesley McNair
- Titanic Memorial
- The Wharf

== History ==
Much of the physical construction of the station was complete by 1980, and its opening was initially to occur in 1983. However, due to litigation surrounding where the line would terminate in Prince George's County, planning and construction of the Green Line halted in 1981 and would not resume until 1985. The station opened on December 28, 1991, and coincided with the completion of approximately 2.88 miles (4.63 km) of rail southeast of the L'Enfant Plaza station and the opening of the Anacostia and Navy Yard – Ballpark stations.

=== Name changes ===
The station was renamed Waterfront–SEU in 1997, referring to the nearby Southeastern University. Southeastern University closed in 2009, and the station reverted to the Waterfront name on November 3, 2011.

== Station layout ==
The station has an island platform with a single escalator bank entrance north of the intersection of 4th and M Streets.

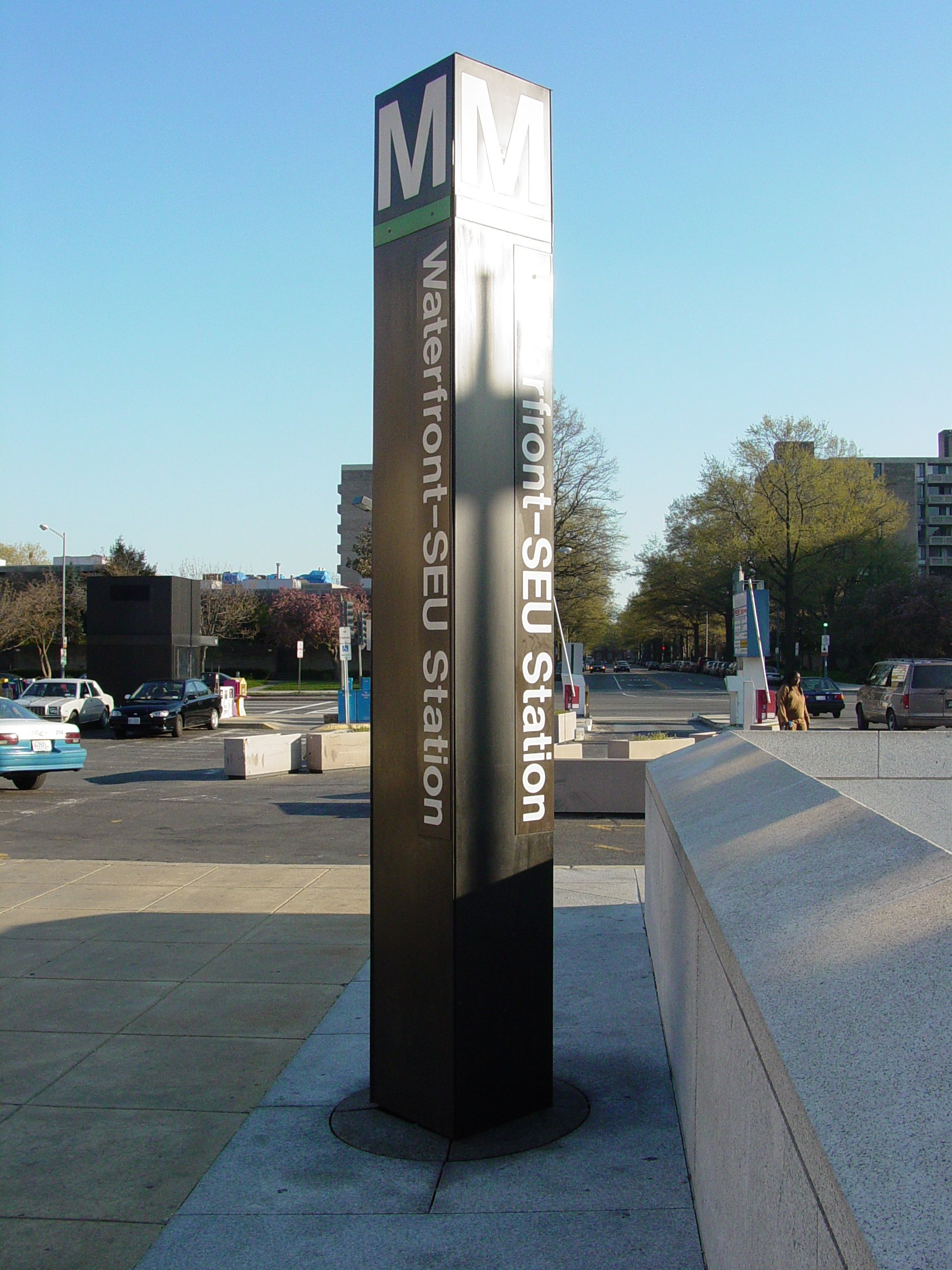
Entrance
