= National Register of Historic Places listings in western Washington, D.C. =

This is a list of properties and districts that are listed on the National Register of Historic Places in the Northwest quadrant of Washington, D.C. which are west of Rock Creek.

This National Park Service list is complete through NPS recent listings posted November 13, 2026.

== Current listings ==
	Name on the Register	Image	Date listed	Location	Neighborhood	Description
1	Alban Towers Apartment Building	Alban Towers Apartment Building	September 9, 1994 (#94001040)	3700 Massachusetts Ave., NW; 38°55′43″N 77°04′26″W	Cathedral Heights	
2	American Revolution Statuary	American Revolution Statuary	July 14, 1978 (#78000256)	Public buildings and various parks within DC; 38°56′16″N 77°05′09″W	American University Park	14 statues including 11 in central DC, and General Artemas Ward in American University Park
3	Babcock-Macomb House	Babcock-Macomb House	February 10, 1995 (#94001633)	3415 Massachusetts Ave., NW; 38°55′29″N 77°04′04″W	Massachusetts Heights	
4	Newton D. Baker House	Newton D. Baker House	December 8, 1976 (#76002126)	3017 N St., NW; 38°54′25″N 77°03′37″W	Georgetown	
5	Bazelon-McGovern House	Bazelon-McGovern House	April 30, 2021 (#100006457)	3020 University Terrace NW; 38°55′50″N 77°05′51″W	Palisades	
6	Alexander Graham Bell Laboratory	Alexander Graham Bell Laboratory	November 28, 1972 (#72001436)	3414 Volta Pl., NW; 38°54′34″N 77°04′09″W	Georgetown	
7	Boulder Bridge and Ross Drive Bridge	Boulder Bridge	March 20, 1980 (#80000348)	Rock Creek Park; 38°56′53″N 77°02′42″W	Rock Creek Park	Boulder Bridge crosses Rock Creek, while Ross Drive Bridge crosses a tributary west of it
8	Building at 3901 Connecticut Ave., NW	Building at 3901 Connecticut Ave., NW	September 11, 1997 (#97001117)	3901 Connecticut Ave., NW; 38°56′24″N 77°03′38″W	Forest Hills	
9	Hilleary T. Burrows House	Hilleary T. Burrows House	June 27, 2011 (#11000377)	4520 River Rd., NW; 38°57′20″N 77°05′25″W	American University Park	American University Park in Washington, D.C.: Its Early Houses, Pre-Civil War to 1911 MPS
10	Samuel and Harriet Burrows House	Samuel and Harriet Burrows House	June 28, 2011 (#11000378)	4624 Verplanck Pl., NW; 38°56′37″N 77°05′30″W	American University Park	American University Park in Washington, D.C.: Its Early Houses, Pre-Civil War to 1911 MPS
11	Capital Traction Company Union Station	Capital Traction Company Union Station	August 9, 2019 (#100004248)	3600 M Street NW; 38°54′18″N 77°04′11″W	Georgetown	
12	Carnegie Institution of Washington, Geophysical Laboratory	Carnegie Institution of Washington, Geophysical Laboratory	December 29, 1994 (#94001511)	2801 Upton St., NW; 38°56′35″N 77°03′24″W	Forest Hills	Building now houses the Levine School of Music.
13	Castle Gatehouse, Washington Aqueduct	Castle Gatehouse, Washington Aqueduct	March 13, 1975 (#75002048)	Near jct. of Reservoir Rd. and MacArthur Blvd., NW; 38°54′39″N 77°05′24″W	Foxhall	
14	Cathedral Mansions Apartment Buildings	Cathedral Mansions Apartment Buildings	September 9, 1994 (#94001037)	2900, 3000 and 3100 Connecticut Ave., NW; 38°55′48″N 77°03′21″W	Woodley Park	
15	The Causeway	The Causeway	June 28, 1990 (#90000910)	3029 Klingle Rd., NW; 38°55′54″N 77°03′40″W	Cleveland Park	Also known as Tregaron
16	Chain Bridge Road School	Chain Bridge Road School	December 9, 2003 (#03001255)	2820 Chain Bridge Rd. 38°55′45″N 77°05′48″W	Palisades	
17	N. Webster Chappell House	N. Webster Chappell House	June 23, 2011 (#11000379)	4131 Yuma St., NW; 38°56′48″N 77°04′52″W	Tenleytown	Tenleytown in Washington, D.C.: 1770-1941, MPS
18	Chesapeake and Ohio Canal National Historical Park	Chesapeake and Ohio Canal National Historical Park	October 15, 1966 (#66000036)	Bordering the Potomac River from Georgetown, D.C. to Cumberland, Maryland; 38°54′15″N 77°03′46″W	Georgetown	Boundary increase February 3, 2015
19	Chesapeake and Potomac Telephone Company, Cleveland-Emerson Exchange	Chesapeake and Potomac Telephone Company, Cleveland-Emerson Exchange	September 8, 2017 (#100001578)	4268 Wisconsin Ave. NW; 38°56′41″N 77°04′40″W	Tenleytown	
20	Chevy Chase Arcade	Chevy Chase Arcade	August 4, 2003 (#03000730)	5520 Connecticut Ave. 38°57′49″N 77°04′30″W	Chevy Chase	
21	Chevy Chase Savings Bank	Chevy Chase Savings Bank	April 27, 2023 (#100008870)	5530 Connecticut Ave. NW; 38°57′50″N 77°04′30″W		
22	Chevy Chase Theater	Chevy Chase Theater	July 18, 1996 (#96000734)	5612 Connecticut Ave. 38°57′56″N 77°04′35″W	Chevy Chase	
23	Christ Church	Christ Church	March 16, 1972 (#72001421)	3116 O St., NW; 38°54′47″N 77°03′43″W	Georgetown	
24	City Tavern	City Tavern	January 17, 1992 (#91001489)	3206 M St., NW; 38°54′17″N 77°03′48″W	Georgetown	
25	Civil War Fort Sites	Civil War Fort Sites	July 15, 1974 (#74000274)	Arc of sites surrounding central Washington in Maryland, Virginia, and D.C. 38°57′10″N 77°04′42″W	All quadrants	At the outset of the Civil War in 1861, Washington became a critical target for rebel attacks but was virtually without protection. The Union Army hastily began construction of a fortified defense line around the city, the physical remnants of which encompass these 19 earthwork forts, including Battery Kemble, Fort Bayard, Fort Reno, and Fort DeRussy. See also National Register listings in central D.C., upper NW D.C., NE D.C., SE D.C., Prince George's County, Maryland, and Fairfax County, Virginia.
26	Cleveland Park Historic District	Cleveland Park Historic District	April 27, 1987 (#87000628)	Roughly bounded by Tilden St., Connecticut Ave., Klingle Rd., and Wisconsin Ave. 38°56′07″N 77°03′54″W	Cleveland Park	
27	Cloverdale	Cloverdale	August 9, 1990 (#90001115)	2600 and 2608 Tilden St. NW; 38°56′25″N 77°03′16″W	Forest Hills	
28	Colony Hill Historic District	Colony Hill Historic District	May 21, 2021 (#100006546)	1700-1731, 1800-1821, 4501-4520 Hoban Rd. NW, 1801-1820 45th St. NW, 4407-4444 Hadfield Rd. NW, 1701-1717 Foxhall Rd. NW. 38°54′50″N 77°05′04″W	Berkley	
29	Conduit Road Schoolhouse	Conduit Road Schoolhouse	November 30, 1973 (#73000220)	4954 MacArthur Blvd., NW; 38°55′17″N 77°05′59″W	Palisades	
30	Connecticut Avenue Bridge over Klingle Valley	Connecticut Avenue Bridge over Klingle Valley	May 21, 2004 (#04000448)	Connecticut Avenue, NW over Klingel Valley; 38°56′01″N 77°03′23″W	Cleveland Park	
31	Convent de Bon Secours	Convent de Bon Secours	November 19, 2004 (#04001237)	4101 Yuma St. NW; 38°56′54″N 77°04′50″W	Tenleytown	
32	Customhouse and Post Office	Customhouse and Post Office	September 10, 1971 (#71001006)	1221 31st St., NW; 38°54′21″N 77°03′39″W	Georgetown	
33	Colonel William Robert Davis House	Colonel William Robert Davis House	October 23, 2015 (#15000742)	3020 Albemarle St. NW; 38°56′52″N 77°03′47″W	North Cleveland Park	
34	Sofia Reyes de Veyra Residence	Sofia Reyes de Veyra Residence	December 13, 2024 (#100011144)	2610 Cathedral Avenue, NW; 38°55′41″N 77°03′17″W		
35	Charles Dickson Site	Charles Dickson Site	May 29, 2024 (#100010450)	Address Restricted	Rock Creek Park	
36	Jane Dickson Site	Jane Dickson Site	May 29, 2024 (#100010451)	Address Restricted	Rock Creek Park	
37	Dumbarton Bridge	Dumbarton Bridge	July 16, 1973 (#73002080)	Q St. over Rock Creek; 38°54′39″N 77°03′04″W	Georgetown	
38	Dumbarton House	Dumbarton House	January 28, 1991 (#90002148)	2715 Q St., NW. 38°54′39″N 77°03′22″W	Georgetown	
39	Dumbarton Oaks Park and Montrose Park	Dumbarton Oaks Park and Montrose Park	May 28, 1967 (#67000028)	R St. NW; 38°54′55″N 77°03′44″W	Georgetown	
40	Dumblane	Dumblane	September 21, 2005 (#05000784)	4120 Warren St., NW. 38°56′46″N 77°04′55″W	Tenleytown	
41	Eldbrooke United Methodist Church	Eldbrooke United Methodist Church	September 5, 2008 (#08000840)	4100 River Rd., NW. 38°56′56″N 77°04′49″W	Tenleytown	
42	Engine Company 29	Engine Company 29	June 6, 2007 (#07000534)	4811 MacArthur Blvd., NW; 38°54′56″N 77°05′37″W	Palisades	Colonial Revival; "one of the more successful" designs by Municipal Architect Albert L. Harris
43	Engine Company 31	Engine Company 31	May 18, 2011 (#11000285)	4930 Connecticut Ave., NW; 38°57′16″N 77°04′10″W	North Cleveland Park	
44	Episcopal Home for Children	Episcopal Home for Children	August 5, 2025 (#100012073)	5901 Utah Avenue NW; 38°58′04″N 77°03′40″W		
45	Equitable Life Insurance Building	Equitable Life Insurance Building	July 29, 2019 (#100002110)	3900 Wisconsin Ave. NW. 38°56′26″N 77°04′33″W		
46	Evermay	Evermay	April 3, 1973 (#73002083)	1623 28th St., NW. 38°54′41″N 77°03′24″W	Georgetown	
47	Forrest-Marbury House	Forrest-Marbury House	July 2, 1973 (#73002084)	3350 M St., NW. 38°54′17″N 77°04′04″W	Georgetown	
48	Foxhall Village Historic District	Foxhall Village Historic District	November 29, 2007 (#07001221)	Bounded by Reservoir Rd. NW, Glover-Archibald Park, P St. NW & Foxhall Rd. NW. 38°54′37″N 77°04′56″W	Foxhall Village	
49	Garden Club of America Entrance Markers at Chevy Chase Circle	Garden Club of America Entrance Markers at Chevy Chase Circle	April 29, 2008 (#08000346)	Reservation 335A; 38°58′03″N 77°04′37″W	Chevy Chase	
50	Garden Club of America Entrance Markers at Westmoreland Circle	Garden Club of America Entrance Markers at Westmoreland Circle	April 29, 2008 (#08000348)	Reservation 559; 38°56′56″N 77°06′03″W	Westmoreland Circle	
51	Garden Club of America Entrance Markers at Wisconsin Avenue	Garden Club of America Entrance Markers at Wisconsin Avenue	May 12, 2008 (#08000394)	Wisconsin Ave. at Western Ave. 38°57′39″N 77°05′08″W	Friendship Heights	
52	Glover-Archbold Park	Glover-Archbold Park	January 16, 2007 (#06001260)	Reservation 351 and 450 (Foundry Branch Valley); 38°55′31″N 77°04′55″W	NW	
53	Georgetown Academy for Young Ladies	Georgetown Academy for Young Ladies	March 29, 1991 (#90002146)	1524 35th St., NW. 38°54′38″N 77°04′16″W	Georgetown	
54	Georgetown Historic District	Georgetown Historic District	May 28, 1967 (#67000025)	Roughly bounded by Whitehaven St., Rock Creek Park, Potomac River, and Georgetown University campus 38°54′34″N 77°03′54″W	Georgetown	The entire Georgetown neighborhood, listed in the second year of the National Register program
55	Georgetown Market	Georgetown Market	May 6, 1971 (#71001000)	3276 M St., NW. 38°54′17″N 77°03′56″W	Georgetown	
56	Georgetown University Astronomical Observatory	Georgetown University Astronomical Observatory	July 2, 1973 (#73002087)	Georgetown University; 38°54′30″N 77°04′39″W	Georgetown	
57	Glen Hurst	Glen Hurst	June 1, 2005 (#05000336)	4933 MacArthur Blvd. NW; 38°55′15″N 77°05′56″W	Foxhall	
58	Grace Protestant Episcopal Church	Grace Protestant Episcopal Church	May 6, 1971 (#71001001)	1041 Wisconsin Ave., NW. 38°54′13″N 77°03′44″W	Georgetown	
59	Grant Road Historic District	Grant Road Historic District	March 3, 2004 (#04000116)	4400 and 4500 blocks of Grant Rd., NW; 38°56′56″N 77°04′33″W	Tenleytown	
60	Halcyon House	Halcyon House	March 31, 1971 (#71001002)	3400 Prospect St., NW. 38°54′20″N 77°04′06″W	Georgetown	
61	Rose Lees Hardy School	Rose Lees Hardy School	June 3, 2019 (#100004071)	1550 Foxhall Rd. NW. 38°54′37″N 77°05′01″W	Palisades	
62	John Stoddert Haw House	John Stoddert Haw House	July 16, 1973 (#73002089)	2808 N St., NW. 38°54′23″N 77°03′29″W	Georgetown	
63	Healy Building, Georgetown University	Healy Building, Georgetown University	May 27, 1971 (#71001003)	Georgetown University campus, junction of O and Thirty-seventh Sts. 38°54′26″N 77°04′23″W	Georgetown	
64	The Highlands	The Highlands	March 16, 1972 (#72001423)	3825 Wisconsin Ave., NW. 38°56′21″N 77°04′27″W	Cleveland Park	Now the Sidwell Friends School
65	Hillandale-Main Residence and Gatehouse	Hillandale-Main Residence and Gatehouse	January 31, 1995 (#94001595)	3905 Mansion Ct., NW. and 3905 Reservoir Rd., NW. 38°54′55″N 77°04′43″W	Burleith-Hillandale	
66	Heurich-Parks House	Heurich-Parks House	October 13, 2015 (#15000719)	3400 Massachusetts Ave., NW. 38°55′28″N 77°04′05″W	Observatory Circle	
67	Immaculata Seminary Historic District	Immaculata Seminary Historic District	May 19, 2014 (#14000209)	4300 Nebraska Ave., NW; 38°56′44″N 77°04′50″W	Tenleytown	Tenley Campus of American University
68	Janney Elementary School	Janney Elementary School	May 10, 2010 (#10000241)	4130 Albemarle St., NW. 38°56′52″N 77°04′50″W	Tenleytown	
69	Jesse Reno School	Jesse Reno School	September 7, 2010 (#10000242)	4820 Howard St., NW; 38°57′09″N 77°04′38″W	Friendship Heights	
70	Dr. Franklin E. Kameny House	Dr. Franklin E. Kameny House	November 2, 2011 (#11000773)	5020 Cathedral Ave., NW; 38°55′48″N 77°06′08″W	Palisades	Ordinary-looking home and office of gay rights activist Frank Kameny (1925-2011). Location of important organizing meetings in gay rights struggle.
71	Kennedy-Warren Apartment Building	Kennedy-Warren Apartment Building	September 7, 1994 (#94001039)	3133 Connecticut Ave., NW; 38°55′54″N 77°03′21″W	Cleveland Park	
72	Francis Scott Key Bridge	Francis Scott Key Bridge	March 1, 1996 (#96000199)	US 29 over the Potomac River; 38°54′08″N 77°04′13″W	Georgetown	
73	Lafayette Elementary School	Lafayette Elementary School	March 30, 2018 (#100002290)	5701 Broad Branch Rd. NW; 38°57′59″N 77°04′05″W	Chevy Chase	
74	Massachusetts Avenue Historic District	Massachusetts Avenue Historic District	October 22, 1974 (#74002166)	Both sides of Massachusetts Ave. between 17th St. and Observatory Circle, NW; 38°54′50″N 77°03′06″W	Dupont Circle, Sheridan-Kalorama and Woodland-Normanstone Terrace	Extends to both sides of Rock Creek
75	Massachusetts Avenue Parking Shops	Massachusetts Avenue Parking Shops	July 25, 2003 (#03000670)	4841-4861 Massachusetts Ave. NW; 38°56′44″N 77°05′47″W	American University Park	
76	The Methodist Cemetery	The Methodist Cemetery	September 5, 2008 (#08000839)	Murdock Mill Rd. between River Rd. and 42nd St., NW. 38°56′57″N 77°05′04″W	Tenleytown	
77	Montrose Park	Montrose Park	November 15, 2007 (#07001178)	R St. & Lovers' Ln. (Res. 324); 38°54′51″N 77°03′42″W	Georgetown	
78	Morris House	Morris House	March 14, 2011 (#10000750)	4001 Linnean Ave., NW; 38°56′29″N 77°03′14″W	Forest Hills	
79	Mount Vernon Seminary for Girls	Mount Vernon Seminary for Girls	August 10, 2016 (#16000523)	3801 Nebraska Ave., NW. 38°56′21″N 77°05′05″W		
80	Mount Zion Cemetery	Mount Zion Cemetery	August 6, 1975 (#75002050)	27th and Q Sts., NW. 38°54′42″N 77°03′16″W	Georgetown	
81	Mount Zion United Methodist Church	Mount Zion United Methodist Church	July 24, 1975 (#75002051)	1334 29th St., NW. 38°54′28″N 77°03′31″W	Georgetown	
82	The National Cathedral	The National Cathedral	May 3, 1974 (#74002170)	Wisconsin and Massachusetts Ave., NW. 38°55′46″N 77°04′12″W	Cathedral Heights	
83	National Presbyterian Church	National Presbyterian Church	January 12, 2022 (#100007331)	4101, 4121, and 4125 Nebraska Ave. NW; 4120-4124 Van Ness Street NW. 38°56′33″N 77°04′53″W		
84	National Zoological Park	National Zoological Park	April 11, 1973 (#73002104)	3000 block of Connecticut Ave., NW. 38°55′44″N 77°02′59″W	Rock Creek Park	
85	Francis Griffith Newlands Memorial Fountain	Francis Griffith Newlands Memorial Fountain	October 12, 2007 (#07001058)	Chevy Chase Cir., Connecticut & Western Aves., NW (Res. 335A); 38°58′10″N 77°04′38″W	Chevy Chase	
86	Nixon-Mounsey House (1949-1976)	Nixon-Mounsey House (1949-1976)	May 24, 2022 (#100007758)	2915 University Terr. NW; 38°55′41″N 77°05′52″W	Palisades	
87	North Corner Boundary Marker of the Original District of Columbia	North Corner Boundary Marker of the Original District of Columbia	November 1, 1996 (#96001258)	1880 block of East-West Hwy. 38°59′45″N 77°02′29″W	Colonial Village	
88	Northwest No. 4 Boundary Marker of the Original District of Columbia	Northwest No. 4 Boundary Marker of the Original District of Columbia	November 1, 1996 (#96001241)	5906 Dalecarlia Pl., NW; 38°56′16″N 77°06′56″W	Palisades	
89	Northwest No. 5 Boundary Marker of the Original District of Columbia	Northwest No. 5 Boundary Marker of the Original District of Columbia	November 1, 1996 (#96001240)	Dalecarlia Reservoir, 600 ft. W of Dalecarlia Parkway and 300 ft SE of concrete culvert 38°56′41″N 77°06′24″W	Dalecarlia Reservoir	
90	Northwest No. 6 Boundary Marker of the Original District of Columbia	Northwest No. 6 Boundary Marker of the Original District of Columbia	November 1, 1996 (#96001262)	150 ft. NE of jct. of Park and Western Aves., NW; 38°57′19″N 77°05′37″W	American University Park	
91	Northwest No. 7 Boundary Marker of the Original District of Columbia	Northwest No. 7 Boundary Marker of the Original District of Columbia	November 1, 1996 (#96001261)	5600 Western Ave. 38°57′56″N 77°04′49″W	Chevy Chase	
92	Northwest No. 8 Boundary Marker of the Original District of Columbia	Northwest No. 8 Boundary Marker of the Original District of Columbia	November 1, 1996 (#96001260)	6422 Western Ave. 38°58′32″N 77°04′03″W	Barnaby Woods	
93	Northwest No. 9 Boundary Marker of the Original District of Columbia	Northwest No. 9 Boundary Marker of the Original District of Columbia	November 1, 1996 (#96001259)	Rock Creek Park, approximately 165 ft. NW of the centerline of Daniel Rd. and 5 ft. SE from edge of 2701 Daniel Rd. 38°59′08″N 77°03′16″W	Rock Creek Park	
94	Oak Hill Cemetery Chapel	Oak Hill Cemetery Chapel	March 16, 1972 (#72001429)	R St. at 29th St., NW. 38°54′46″N 77°03′32″W	Georgetown	
95	Old Stone House	Old Stone House	November 30, 1973 (#73000219)	3051 M St., NW. 38°54′20″N 77°03′38″W	Georgetown	
96	Old Swedish Ambassador's Residence	Old Swedish Ambassador's Residence	April 11, 2024 (#100010177)	3900 Nebraska Avenue NW; 38°56′27″N 77°05′03″W		
97	Old Woodley Park Historic District	Old Woodley Park Historic District	June 15, 1990 (#90000856)	Roughly bounded by Rock Creek Park, 24th St., 29th St., Woodley Rd. and Cathedral Ave., NW. 38°55′32″N 77°03′12″W	Woodley Park	
98	Isaac Owens House	Isaac Owens House	June 19, 1973 (#73002107)	2806 N St., NW. 38°54′24″N 77°03′29″W	Georgetown	
99	Peirce Mill	Peirce Mill	March 24, 1969 (#69000014)	Rock Creek Park, NW corner of Tilden St. and Beach Dr., NW; 38°56′24″N 77°03′08″W	Rock Creek Park	
100	Perna Brothers' Chesapeake Street Houses	Perna Brothers' Chesapeake Street Houses	June 26, 2017 (#100001234)	4112-4118 Chesapeake St., NW; 38°57′04″N 77°04′53″W		
101	Pierce Springhouse and Barn	Pierce Springhouse and Barn	October 25, 1973 (#73000222)	2400 block of Tilden St. and Beach Dr., NW; 38°56′27″N 77°03′13″W	Forest Hills	
102	Peirce Still House	Peirce Still House	September 6, 1990 (#90001295)	2400 Tilden St., NW. 38°56′25″N 77°03′10″W	Forest Hills	
103	Ponce de Leon Apartment Building	Ponce de Leon Apartment Building	September 7, 1994 (#94001038)	4514 Connecticut Ave., NW. 38°56′55″N 77°03′59″W	North Cleveland Park	
104	Potomac Boat Club	Potomac Boat Club	June 27, 1991 (#91000786)	3530 Water St., NW. 38°54′15″N 77°04′14″W	Georgetown	
105	Potomac Palisades Site	Potomac Palisades Site	April 15, 1982 (#82001714)	Above the Potomac at the junction of MacArthur Boulevard and Foxhall Rd. 38°54′21″N 77°04′52″W	NW	
106	Prospect House	Prospect House	March 16, 1972 (#72001430)	3508 Prospect St., NW. 38°54′20″N 77°04′11″W	Georgetown	
107	Quality Hill	Quality Hill	March 16, 1972 (#72001431)	3425 Prospect St., NW. 38°54′22″N 77°04′09″W	Georgetown	
108	Rock Creek and Potomac Parkway Historic District	Rock Creek and Potomac Parkway Historic District	May 4, 2005 (#05000367)	Rock Creek and Potomac Parkway; 38°54′47″N 77°03′16″W	NW	Extends to both sides of Rock Creek
109	Rock Creek Park Historic District	Rock Creek Park Historic District	October 23, 1991 (#91001524)	Roughly, Rock Creek Park from Klingle Rd. to Montgomery County line 38°57′27″N 77°02′42″W	NW	See Rock Creek Park. Extends to both sides of Rock Creek.
110	Theodore Roosevelt Island National Memorial	Theodore Roosevelt Island National Memorial	October 15, 1966 (#66000869)	S of Key Bridge in the Potomac River; 38°53′44″N 77°03′44″W	NW	
111	Rosedale	Rosedale	May 8, 1973 (#73002115)	3501 Newark St., NW. 38°56′08″N 77°04′07″W	Cleveland Park	
112	Scheele-Brown House	Scheele-Brown House	June 19, 2017 (#100001213)	2207 Foxhall Rd. NW; 38°55′10″N 77°05′19″W		
113	Sears, Roebuck and Company Department Store	Sears, Roebuck and Company Department Store	February 16, 1996 (#96000061)	4500 Wisconsin Ave., NW; 38°56′54″N 77°04′50″W	Tenleytown	
114	Sedgwick Gardens	Sedgwick Gardens	February 23, 2016 (#16000028)	3726 Connecticut Ave., NW. 38°56′01″N 77°03′27″W	Cleveland Park	
115	Pauline "Polly" Shackleton House	Pauline "Polly" Shackleton House	January 10, 2025 (#100011255)	3232 Reservoir Road, NW; 38°54′45″N 77°03′55″W		
116	William L. Slayton House	William L. Slayton House	October 2, 2008 (#08000956)	3411 Ordway St. 38°56′19″N 77°04′03″W	Cleveland Park	International style house, one of only three houses designed by I.M. Pei
117	Ambassador Romuald Spasowski House	Ambassador Romuald Spasowski House	September 8, 2017 (#100001579)	3101 Albemarle St. NW. 38°56′52″N 77°03′50″W	Forest Hills	
118	Springland	Springland	August 9, 1990 (#90001114)	3550 Tilden St. NW. 38°56′28″N 77°04′13″W	Cleveland Park	
119	Square 1500	Square 1500	August 7, 2003 (#03000731)	4820, 4860, 4872, 4874 Massachusetts Ave., and 4301 49th St. NW; 38°56′40″N 77°05′47″W	Spring Valley	
120	Robert and Lillie May Stone House	Robert and Lillie May Stone House	June 27, 2011 (#11000380)	4901 47th St., NW; 38°57′13″N 77°05′32″W	American University Park	
121	Tilden Hall	Tilden Hall	November 17, 2015 (#15000781)	3945 Connecticut Ave., NW; 38°56′27″N 77°03′39″W		
122	Traveling Carousel	Traveling Carousel	September 11, 1997 (#97001116)	Jct. of Massachusetts and Wisconsin Aves. NW; 38°55′43″N 77°04′15″W	Cathedral Heights	Assembled and operated once a year at the All Hallows Guild spring Flower Mart on the south lawn of the National Cathedral.
123	Tudor Place	Tudor Place	October 15, 1966 (#66000871)	1644 31st St., NW; 38°54′39″N 77°03′48″W	Georgetown	
124	Twin Oaks	Twin Oaks	February 5, 1986 (#86000153)	3225 Woodley Rd. 38°55′54″N 77°03′50″W	NW	
125	U.S. Naval Observatory, U.S. Naval Observatory and Hydrographical Office	U.S. Naval Observatory, U.S. Naval Observatory and Hydrographical Office	August 4, 2025 (#100010550)	3450 Massachusetts Avenue. NW; 38°55′27″N 77°03′59″W		
126	Uptown Theatre	Uptown Theatre	December 15, 2022 (#100008461)	3426 Connecticut Ave. NW; 38°56′06″N 77°03′31″W	Cleveland Park	
127	Van Ness Mausoleum	Van Ness Mausoleum	December 17, 1982 (#82001032)	Oak Hill Cemetery, 3001 R St. NW; 38°54′43″N 77°03′19″W	Georgetown	
128	Vigilant Firehouse	Vigilant Firehouse	May 6, 1971 (#71001008)	1066 Wisconsin Ave., NW. 38°54′16″N 77°03′49″W	Georgetown	
129	Walde-Carter House	Walde-Carter House	June 27, 2011 (#11000381)	4628 48th St., NW; 38°57′02″N 77°05′41″W	American University Park	
130	Wardman Park Annex and Arcade	Wardman Park Annex and Arcade	January 31, 1984 (#84000869)	2600 Woodley Rd. NW; 38°55′30″N 77°03′13″W	Woodley Park	Boundary increase approved May 10, 2019
131	Washington Aqueduct	Washington Aqueduct	September 8, 1973 (#73002123)	5900 MacArthur Blvd., NW; 38°56′09″N 77°06′43″W	Palisades	
132	Washington Canoe Club	Washington Canoe Club	March 19, 1991 (#90002151)	3700 K St., NW. 38°54′16″N 77°04′20″W	Georgetown	
133	George Washington Memorial Parkway	George Washington Memorial Parkway	June 2, 1995 (#95000605)	Roughly, south side of the Potomac River from American Legion to Memorial Bridge and north side from Brickyard Rd. to Chain Bridge; 38°56′00″N 77°06′49″W	NW	Extends into Arlington County, Virginia
134	Western High School	Western High School	July 25, 2003 (#03000673)	35th and R Sts., NW; 38°54′47″N 77°04′14″W	Burleith-Hillandale	
135	Wetzell-Archbold Farmstead	Wetzell-Archbold Farmstead	April 19, 1991 (#91000395)	4437 Reservoir Rd., NW. 38°54′47″N 77°04′56″W	Foxhall	
136	Sarah Whitby Site	Sarah Whitby Site	May 29, 2024 (#100010452)	Address Restricted	Rock Creek Park	
137	Woodrow Wilson High School	Woodrow Wilson High School	May 10, 2010 (#10000243)	3950 Chesapeake St., NW. 38°57′02″N 77°04′37″W	Tenleytown	

== Former listing ==
	Name on the Register	Image	Date listed	Date removed	Location	City or town	Description
1	Bank of Columbia	Bank of Columbia	May 27, 1971 (#71000995)	April 6, 1983	3210 M St., NW.	Georgetown	Also known as the Bureau of Indian Trade, National Firefighting Museum, and the Georgetown Town Hall and Mayor's Office. Now a BCBG.

== See also ==
- National Register of Historic Places listings in the upper NW Quadrant of Washington, D. C.
- National Register of Historic Places listings in central Washington, D.C.
