= Pierce House =

Pierce House may refer to:

== Alabama ==
- William F. Pierce House, Eutaw, Alabama, listed on the NRHP in Alabama

== Arizona ==
- Harry E. Pierce House, Phoenix, Arizona, listed on the NRHP in Phoenix, Arizona
- N. Clyde, House, Phoenix, Arizona, listed on the NRHP in Phoenix, Arizona

== California ==
- Pierce Ranch, Inverness, California, listed on the NRHP in Marin County, California

== Colorado ==
- Pierce-Haley House, Denver, Colorado, listed on the NRHP in downtown Denver, Colorado

== Florida ==
- Thomas R. Pierce House, Bushnell, Florida, listed on the NRHP in Florida

== Idaho ==
- Pierce–Borah House, Garden City, Idaho, listed on the NRHP in Ada County, Idaho

== Indiana ==
- James Pierce Jr. House, West Lafayette, Indiana, [listed on the NRHP in Tippecanoe County, Indiana

== Massachusetts ==
- Pierce Farm Historic District, Arlington, Massachusetts, listed on the NRHP in Massachusetts
- Pierce–Hichborn House, Boston, Massachusetts, listed on the NRHP in Massachusetts
- Pierce House (Dorchester, Massachusetts), in the Dorchester neighborhood of Boston, listed on the NRHP in Massachusetts
- Spencer-Pierce-Little House, Newbury, Massachusetts, listed on the NRHP in Massachusetts
- F. Lincoln Pierce Houses, Newton, Massachusetts, listed on the NRHP in Massachusetts
- Pierce House (Reading, Massachusetts), listed on the NRHP in Massachusetts
- Capt. Mial Pierce Farm, Rehoboth, Massachusetts, listed on the NRHP in Massachusetts
- Peirce–Nichols House, Salem, Massachusetts

== Minnesota ==
- Pierce House (Rochester, Minnesota), Rochester, Minnesota, listed on the NRHP in Olmsted County, Minnesota

== New Hampshire ==
- Pierce Manse or Franklin Pierce House, Concord, New Hampshire, listed on the NRHP in New Hampshire
- Franklin Pierce Homestead, Hillsborough, New Hampshire, listed on the NRHP in New Hampshire

== New Mexico ==
- Pierce-Fuller House, Red River, New Mexico, listed on the NRHP in Taos County, New Mexico

== New York ==
- Charles Pierce House, Durham, New York, listed on the NRHP in New York

== North Carolina ==
- John M. Pierce House, Crumpler, North Carolina, listed on the NRHP in North Carolina

== Ohio ==
- Elijah Pierce Properties, Columbus, Ohio, listed on the NRHP in Ohio
- Edgar T. Pierce House, Salem, Oregon, listed on the NRHP in Oregon

== Pennsylvania ==
- Lukens Pierce House, Ercildoun, Pennsylvania, listed on the NRHP in Pennsylvania
- Jonas J. Pierce House, Sharpsville, Pennsylvania, listed on the NRHP in Pennsylvania
- Tillie Pierce House Bed & Breakfast, (Maltilda's Mercantile), Gettysburg, Pennsylvania, listed as a 19th-century Civil War Building of Adams County
- Joseph Pierce Farm, North Kingstown, Rhode Island, listed on the NRHP in Rhode Island

== Washington, D.C. ==
- Pierce Springhouse and Barn, Washington, D.C., listed on the NRHP in Washington, D.C.
- Pierce-Klingle Mansion, Washington, D.C., listed on the NRHP in Washington, D.C.

== Wisconsin ==
- Carrie Pierce House, Madison, Wisconsin, listed on the NRHP in Wisconsin
