= Customhouse and Post Office (Washington, D.C.) =

Building in Washington, D.C.

- U.S. National Register of Historic Places
- D.C. Inventory of Historic Sites
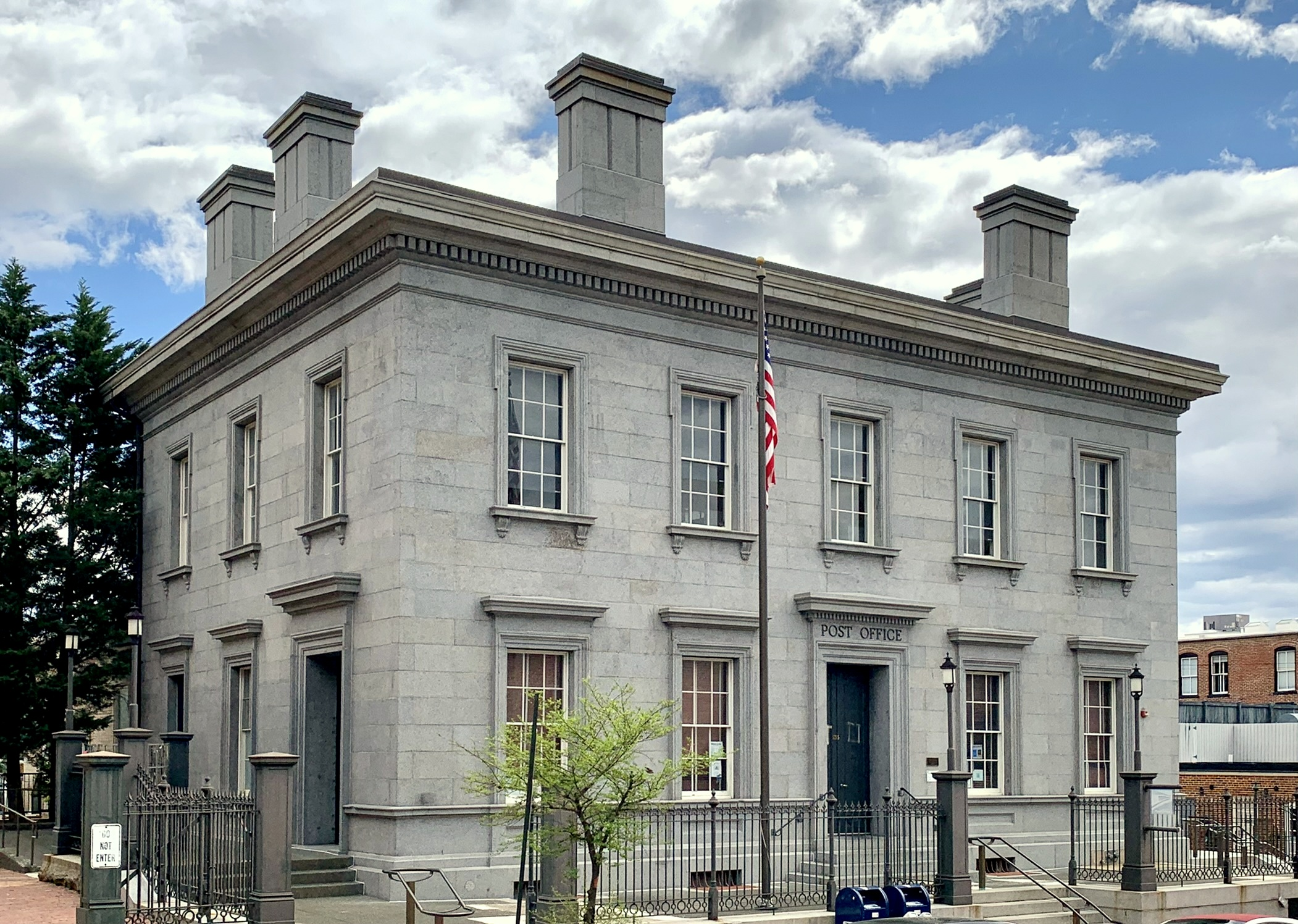
- Post Office in 2022

- Location within Washington, D.C.
- Location: 1221 31st St., NW., Washington, District of Columbia
- Coordinates: 38°54′21″N 77°03′39″W
- Area: 0.3 acres (0.12 ha)
- Built: 1858
- Architect: Ammi B. Young
- Architectural style: Renaissance, Italian Palace
- NRHP reference No.: 71001006

Significant dates
- Added to NRHP: September 10, 1971
- Designated DCIHS: November 8, 1964

The Customhouse and Post Office in Georgetown, Washington, D.C., was completed in 1858 in a Renaissance Revival–Italian Palace style. Construction cost was $55,468. The first floor was occupied by a branch post office and the second floor by the Customs Service. It was listed on the National Register of Historic Places in 1971. It was already included as a contributing building within the Georgetown Historic District.

It was designed during 1856–57 by Ammi B. Young (1798–1874), who was Supervising Architect of the United States Treasury. On June 23, 1967, the customhouse moved from its 31st Street location to a new building at 3180 Bladensburg Road, N.E., Washington, D.C. A small branch post office remains on the first floor.

The main block of the building is 61 feet (19 m) by 46 feet (14 m); it has additions to the north and to the east. It has a low seamed-metal roof.

== Gallery ==
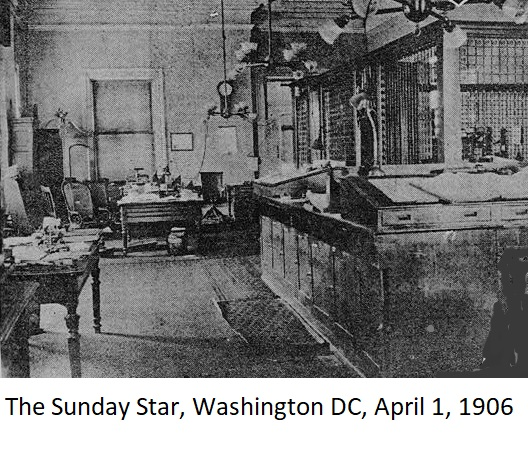
1906 interior photo

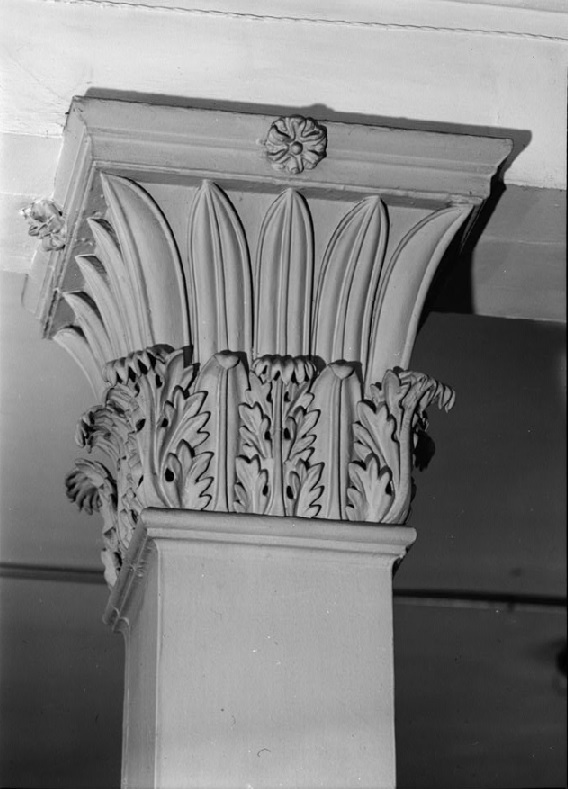
First floor column, 1933

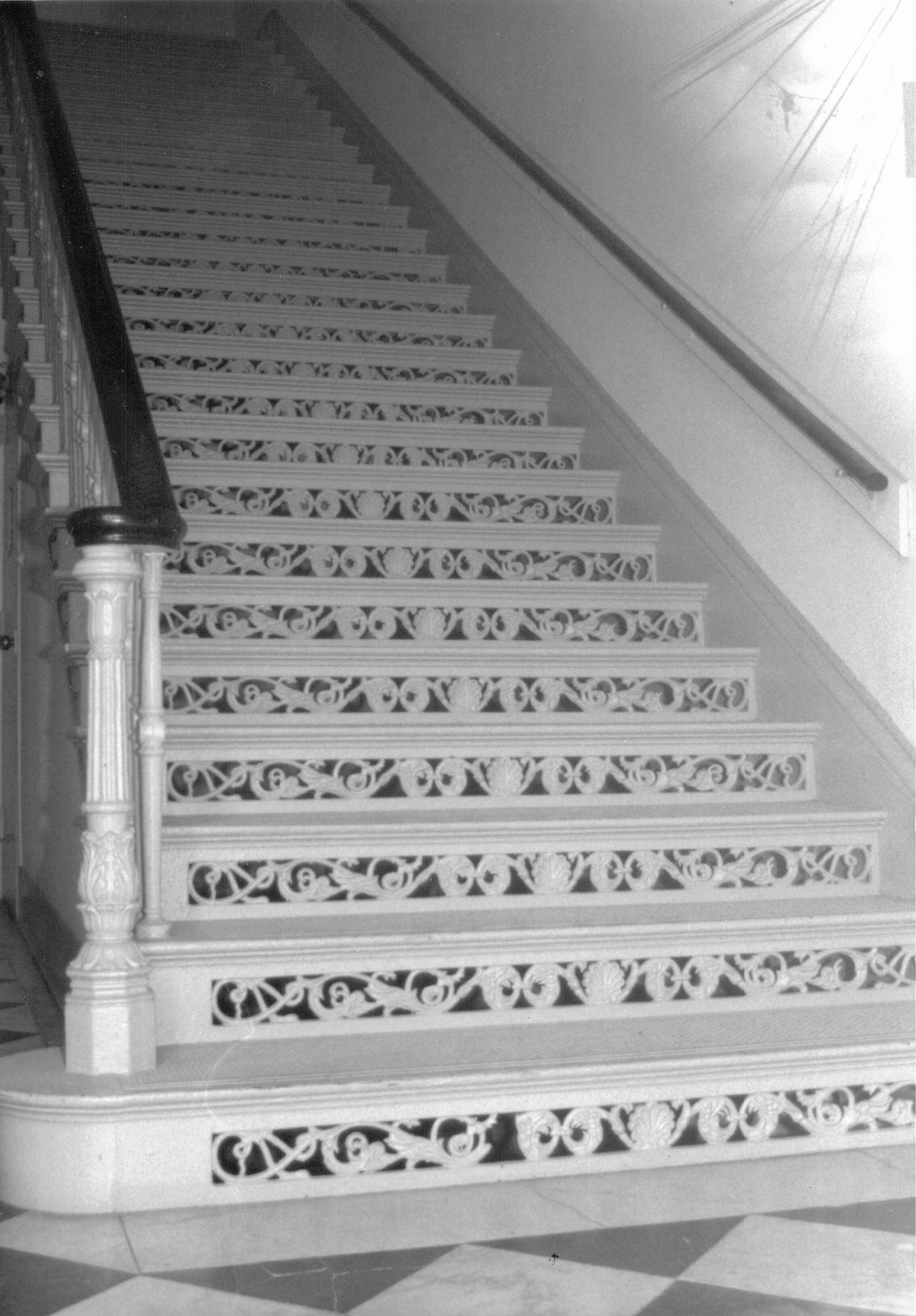
Interior staircase, first floor

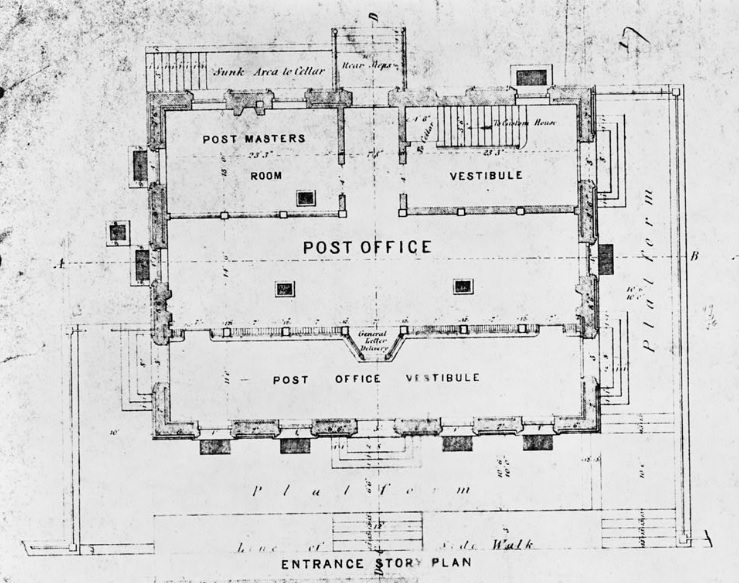
Original first-floor plan

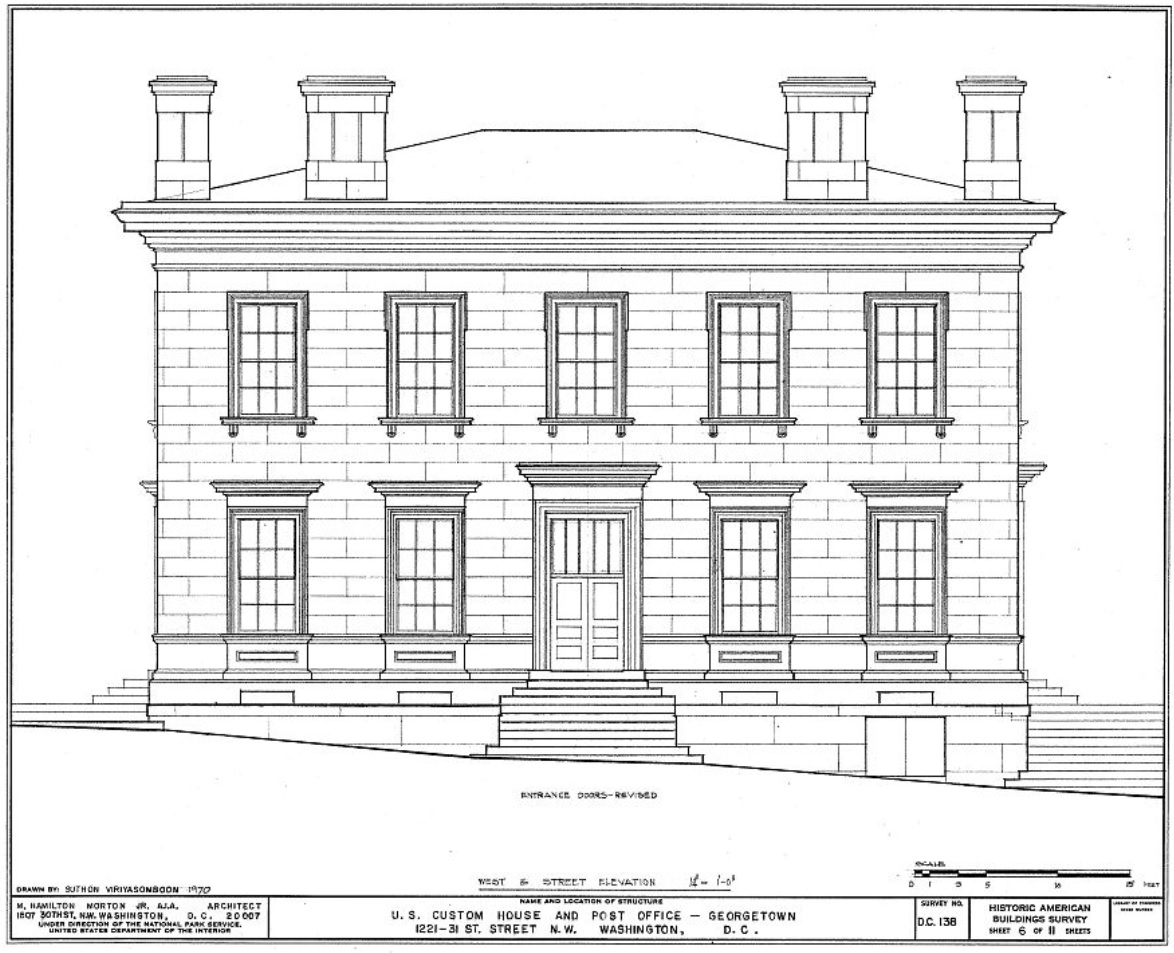
Front elevation, 1970

== See also ==
- List of United States post offices
- National Register of Historic Places listings in western Washington, D.C.
