= Pierce Organ Pipe Factory =

- U.S. National Register of Historic Places
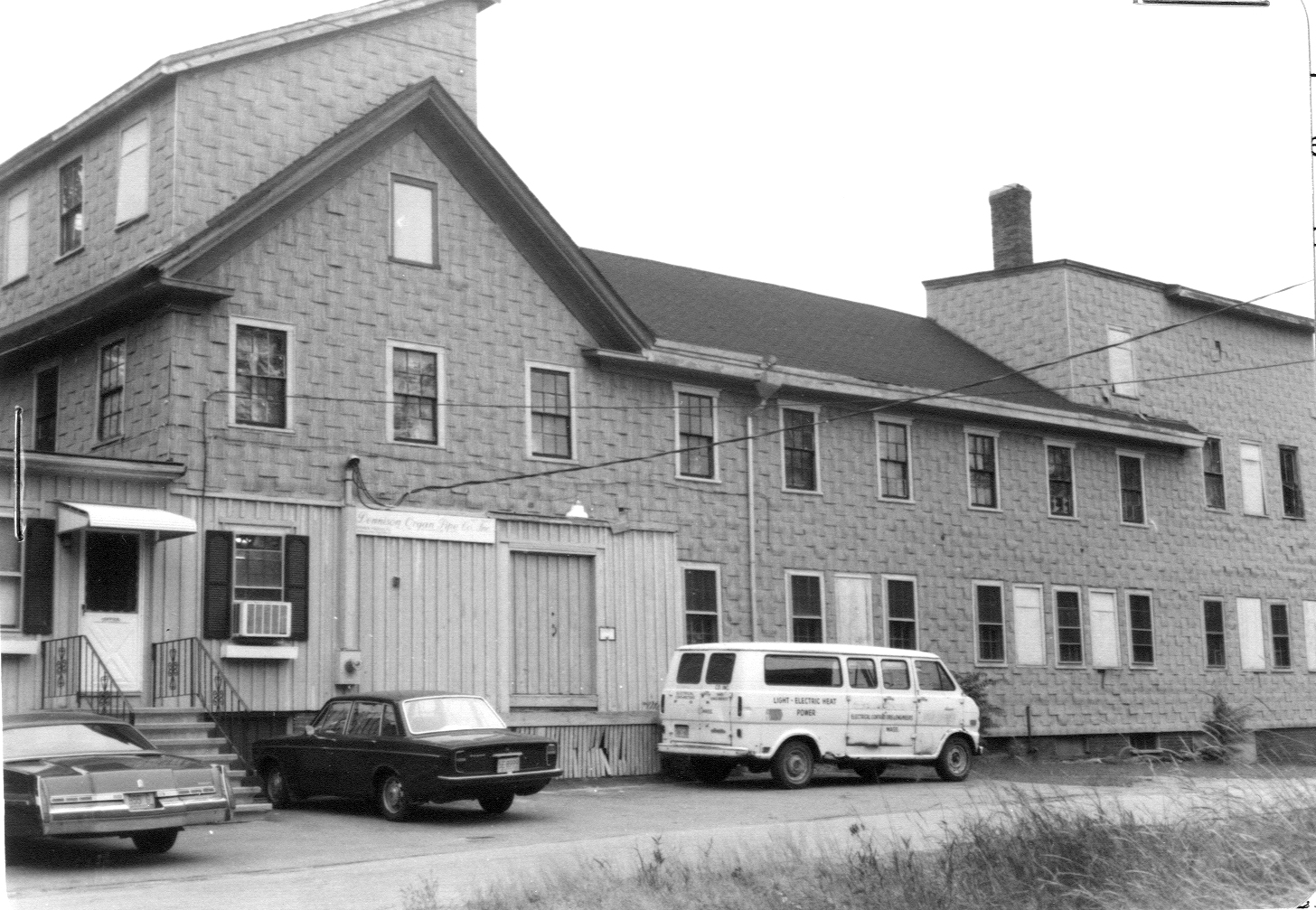

- Location within Massachusetts Location within the United States
- Location: 10–12 Pierce St., Reading, Massachusetts
- Coordinates: 42°31′39.8″N 71°5′44.09″W
- Built: 1852
- Architectural style: Italianate
- MPS: Reading MRA
- NRHP reference No.: 84002795
- Added to NRHP: July 19, 1984

The Pierce Organ Pipe Factory was a historic factory building in Reading, Massachusetts. The oldest portion of the two-story wood-frame Italianate structure was built in 1852 by Samuel Pierce, who had begun the manufacture of organ pipes in his nearby house in the 1840s. The building was expanded several times over the 19th century.

The building was listed on the National Register of Historic Places in 1984.

On Friday October 14, 2011, the building was torn down to make way for the construction of an eight unit condominium.

== See also ==
- National Register of Historic Places listings in Reading, Massachusetts
- National Register of Historic Places listings in Middlesex County, Massachusetts
