= Wetzell-Archbold Farmstead =

Historic house in Washington, D.C., United States

- U.S. National Register of Historic Places
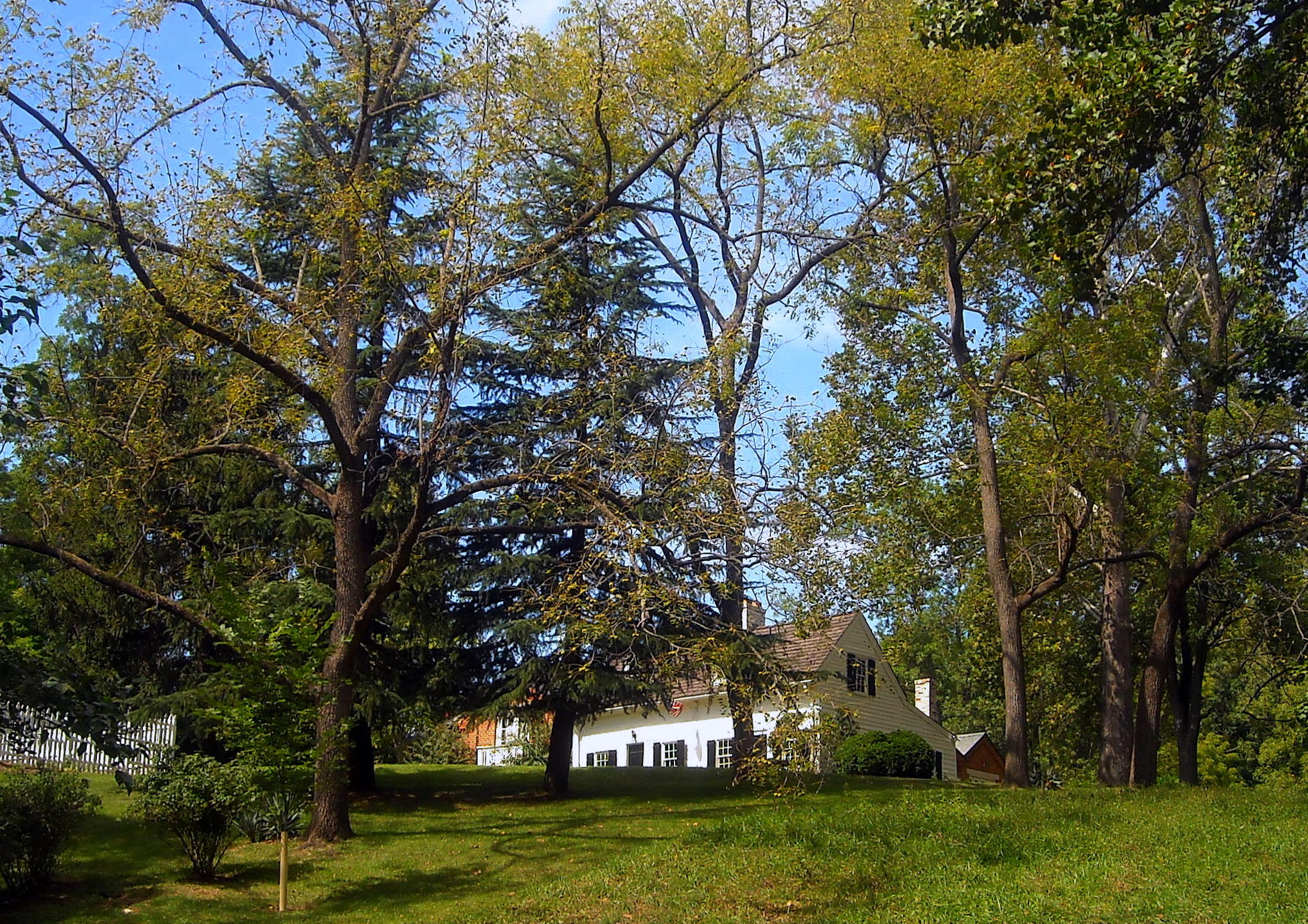
- Wetzell-Archbold Farmstead in 2008

- Location within Washington, D.C.
- Location: 4437 Reservoir Road, N.W., Washington, D.C.
- Coordinates: 38°54′46″N 77°4′56″W
- Area: 1.0538 acres (0.4265 ha)
- Built: 1843
- Built by: Lazarus Wetzell
- NRHP reference No.: 91000395
- Added to NRHP: April 19, 1991

The Wetzell-Archbold Farmstead is an historic stone and log farmhouse, located at 4437 Reservoir Road, Northwest, Washington, D.C., in the Foxhall neighborhood.

== History ==
It was built by Lazarus Wetzell in 1843. The home is listed on the National Register of Historic Places.
