= Massachusetts Avenue Parking Shops =

- U.S. National Register of Historic Places
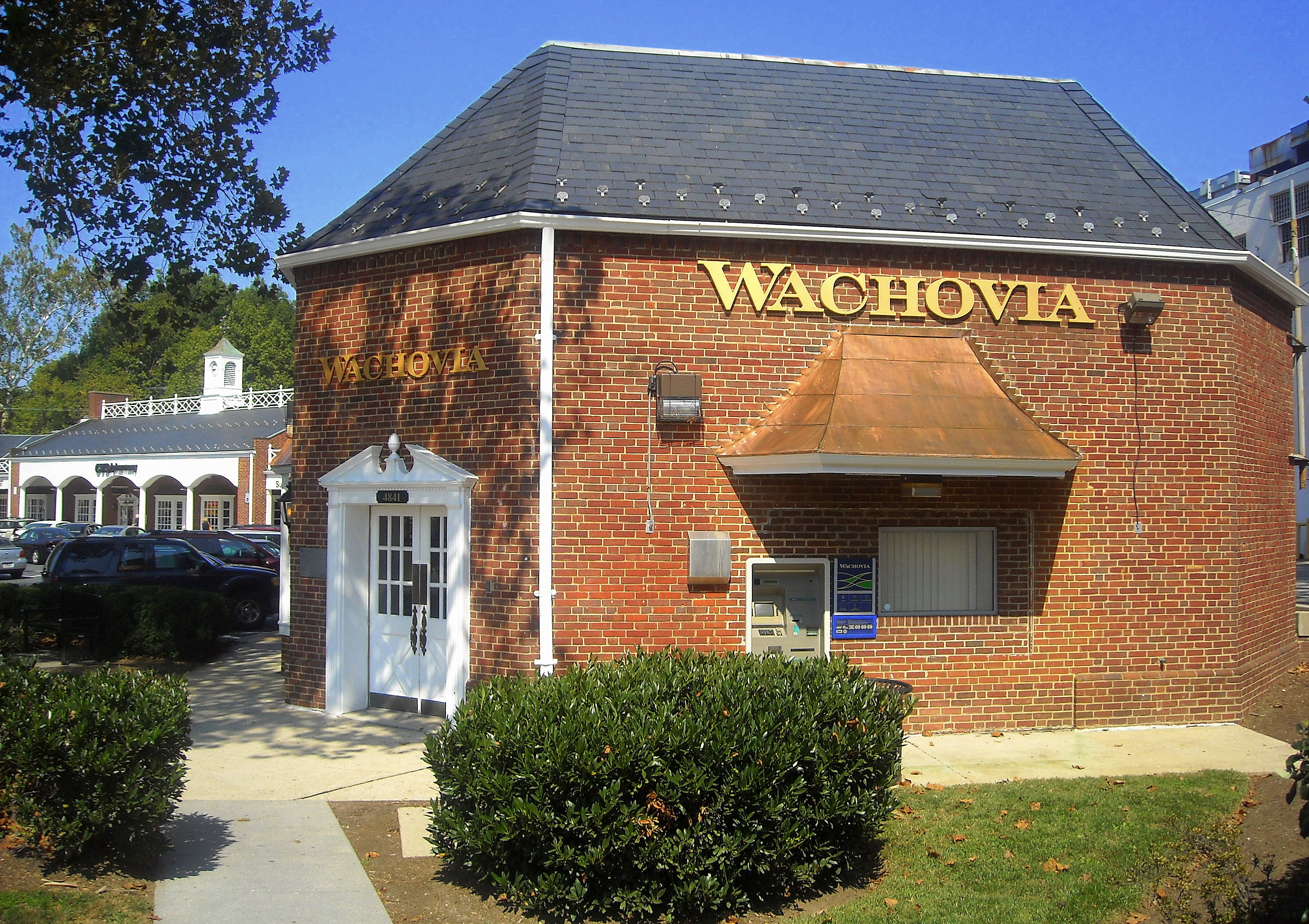
- Massachusetts Avenue Parking Shops in 2008

- Location within the District of Columbia Location within the United States
- Location: 4841-4861 Massachusetts Ave. NW, Washington, District of Columbia
- Coordinates: 38°56′45″N 77°05′45″W
- Area: 1 acre (0.40 ha)
- Built: 1936
- Architect: E. Burton Corning
- Architectural style: Colonial Revival
- NRHP reference No.: 03000670
- Added to NRHP: July 25, 2003

The Massachusetts Parking Shops is a historical neighborhood shopping area built in 1936, among the first developments to integrate the automobile and shopping with off-street parking. It was developed in the modern Colonial Revival style by C. H. Hillegeist following the designs of E. Burton Corning. It was added to the National Register of Historic Places in 2003.

Among the first stores in the small complex were a Sanitary Food Store and an A & P Grocery, a pharmacy, Homewood Hardware, Knife & Fork Delicatessen, Pat-a-Cake Bake Shop, Homewood Beauty Shop, Palace Laundry and a Gulf Oil filling station.

National planning publications used the Massachusetts Avenue Parking Shops as a model and small commercial postwar shopping centers were influenced by the style.

== See also ==
- National Register of Historic Places listings in western Washington, D.C.
