= Dumblane =

Historic house in Washington, D.C., United States

- U.S. National Register of Historic Places
- D.C. Inventory of Historic Sites
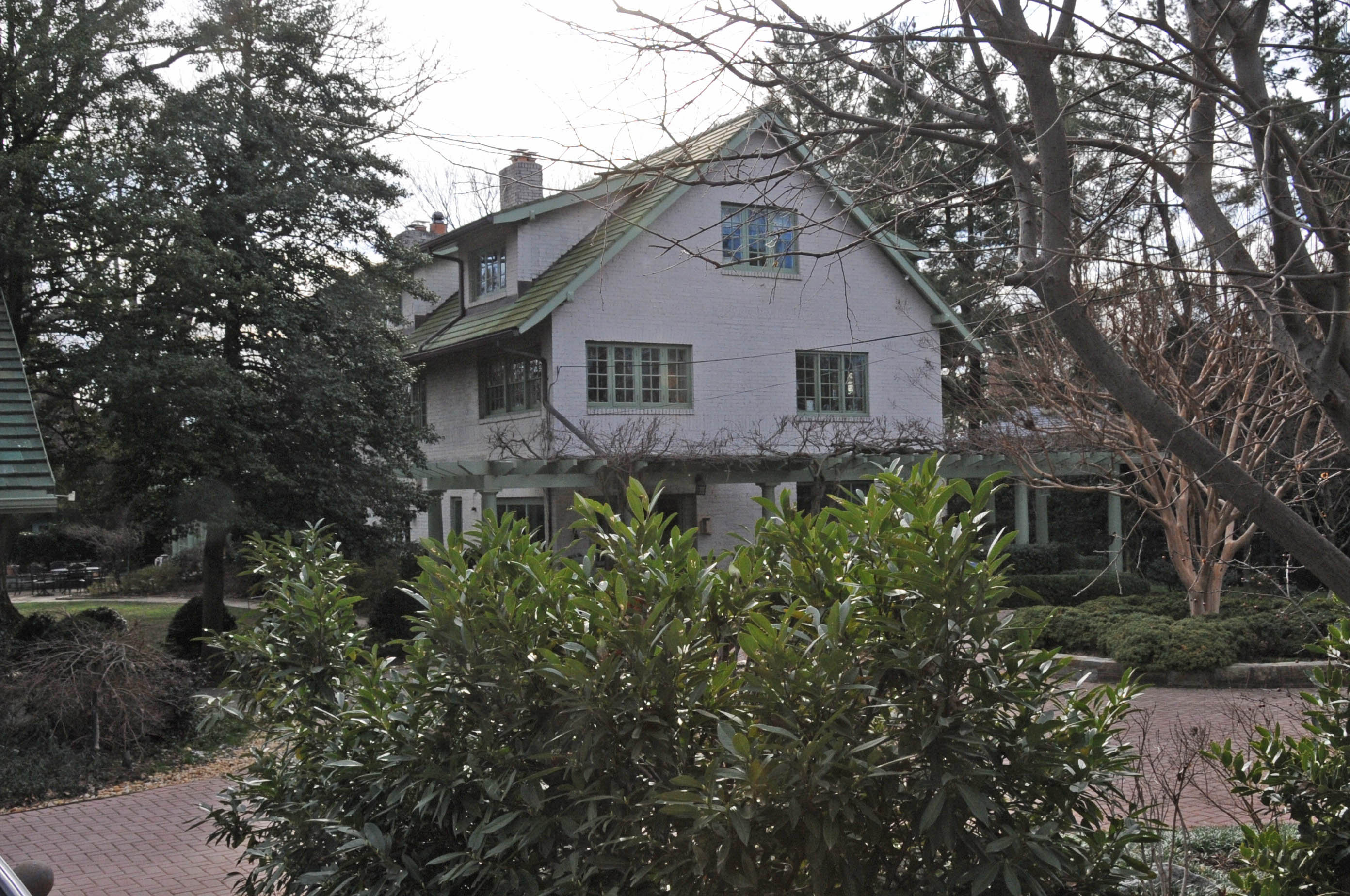
- Dumblane from the north in 2016

- Location within District of Columbia
- Location: 4120 Warren Street NW, Washington, D.C., U.S.
- Coordinates: 38°56′40″N 77°04′55″W
- Built: 1911
- Architect: Gustav Stickley
- Architectural style: American Craftsman
- NRHP reference No.: 05000784

Significant dates
- Added to NRHP: September 21, 2005
- Designated DCIHS: April 28, 2005

Dumblane is a historic house, located at 4120 Warren Street, Northwest, Washington, D.C. in the Tenleytown neighborhood.

== History ==
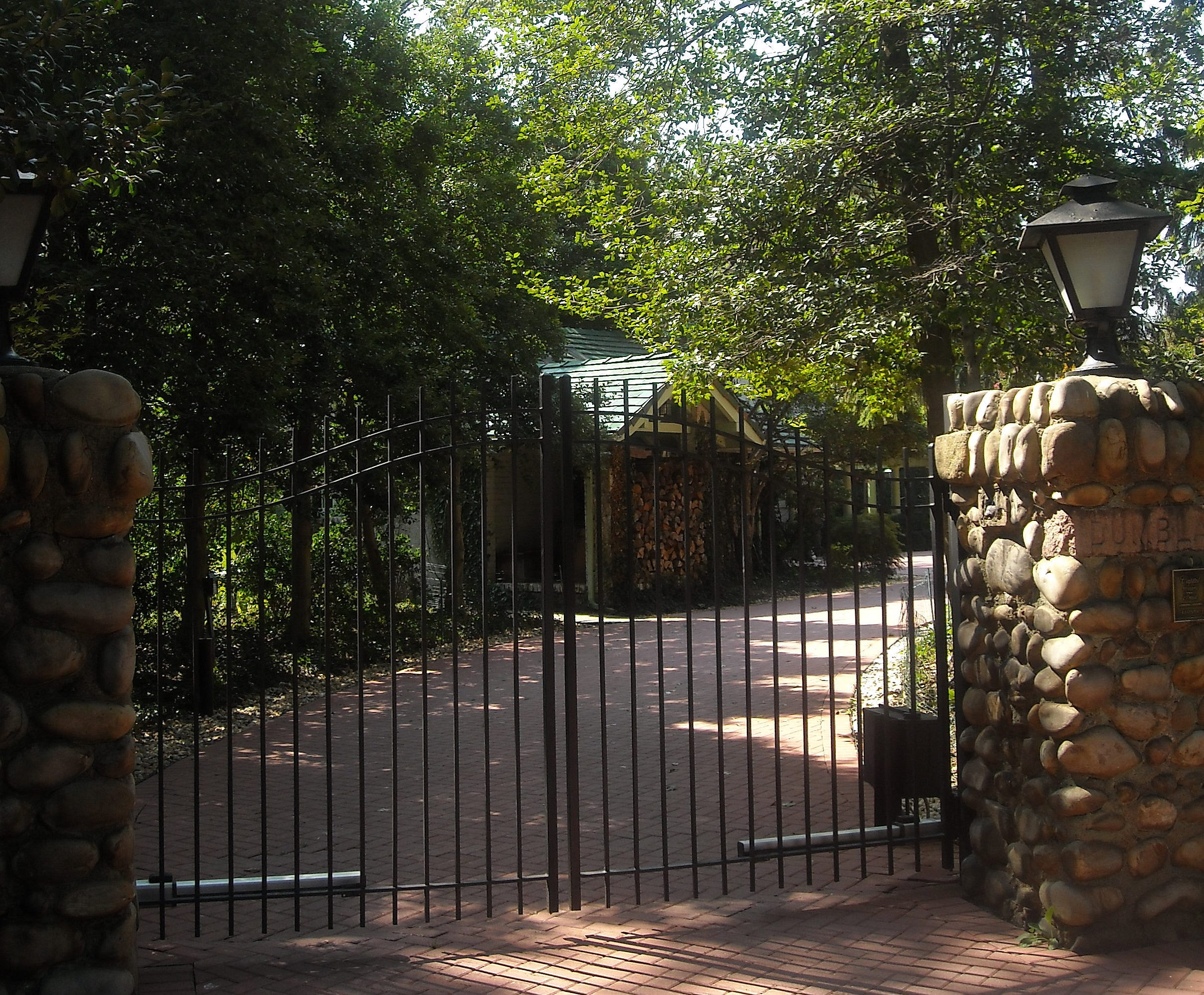
Inscribed entrance gate

The American Craftsman bungalow was built in 1911, by Mr. and Mrs. F. Hazen Bond. The house, occupied by its first owners until 1962, retains its original features as subsequent owners made very little alterations.

It is listed on the National Register of Historic Places. The 2009 property value of Dumblane is $2,238,890.

== See also ==
- Dunblane manor (alternatively spelled Dumblane), a circa 1839 manor house built across the street, after which Dumblane was named
