= Springland (Washington, D.C.) =

Historic house in Washington, D.C., United States

- U.S. National Register of Historic Places
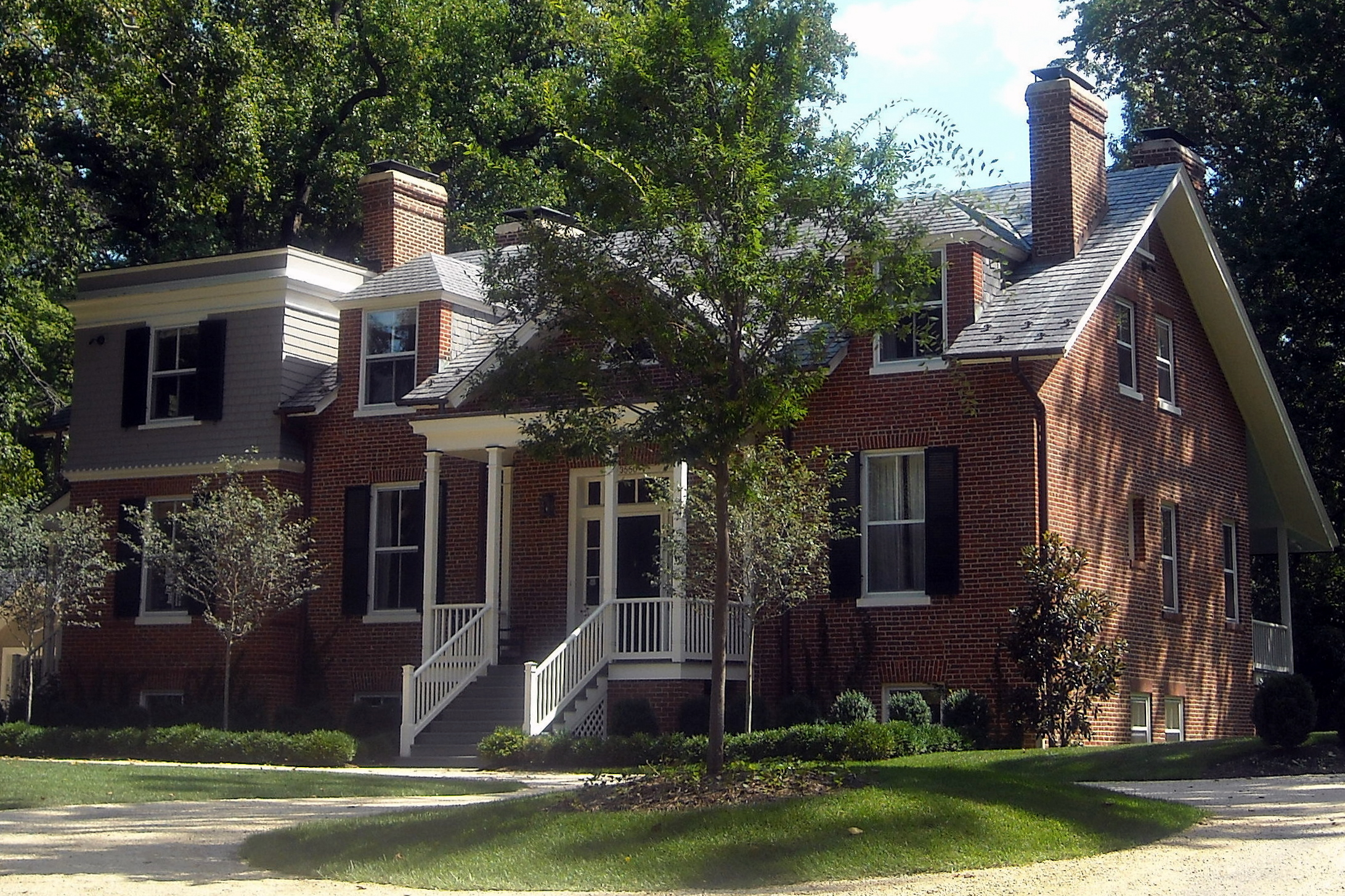
- Springland in 2008

- Location within District of Columbia
- Location: 3550 Tilden Street, N.W. Washington, D.C.
- Coordinates: 38°56′28.93″N 77°4′11.59″W
- Area: .93 acres (0.38 ha)
- Architectural style: vernacular
- NRHP reference No.: 90001114
- Added to NRHP: August 9, 1990

Springland, also known as the Dent House, is a historic house that is located at 3550 Tilden Street, Northwest, Washington, D.C., in the Cleveland Park neighborhood.

== History ==
The vernacular building was constructed in 1845 by the United States' Assistant Attorney General, Henry Hatch Dent and his wife Ann Maria Adlum Dent, daughter of John Adlum. There was an addition in 1891. James Macbride Sterrett lived there from 1891 to 1923.

Springland was added to the National Register of Historic Places on August 9, 1990. Its 2009 property value was $2,768,220.
