= Potomac Palisades Site =

- U.S. National Register of Historic Places
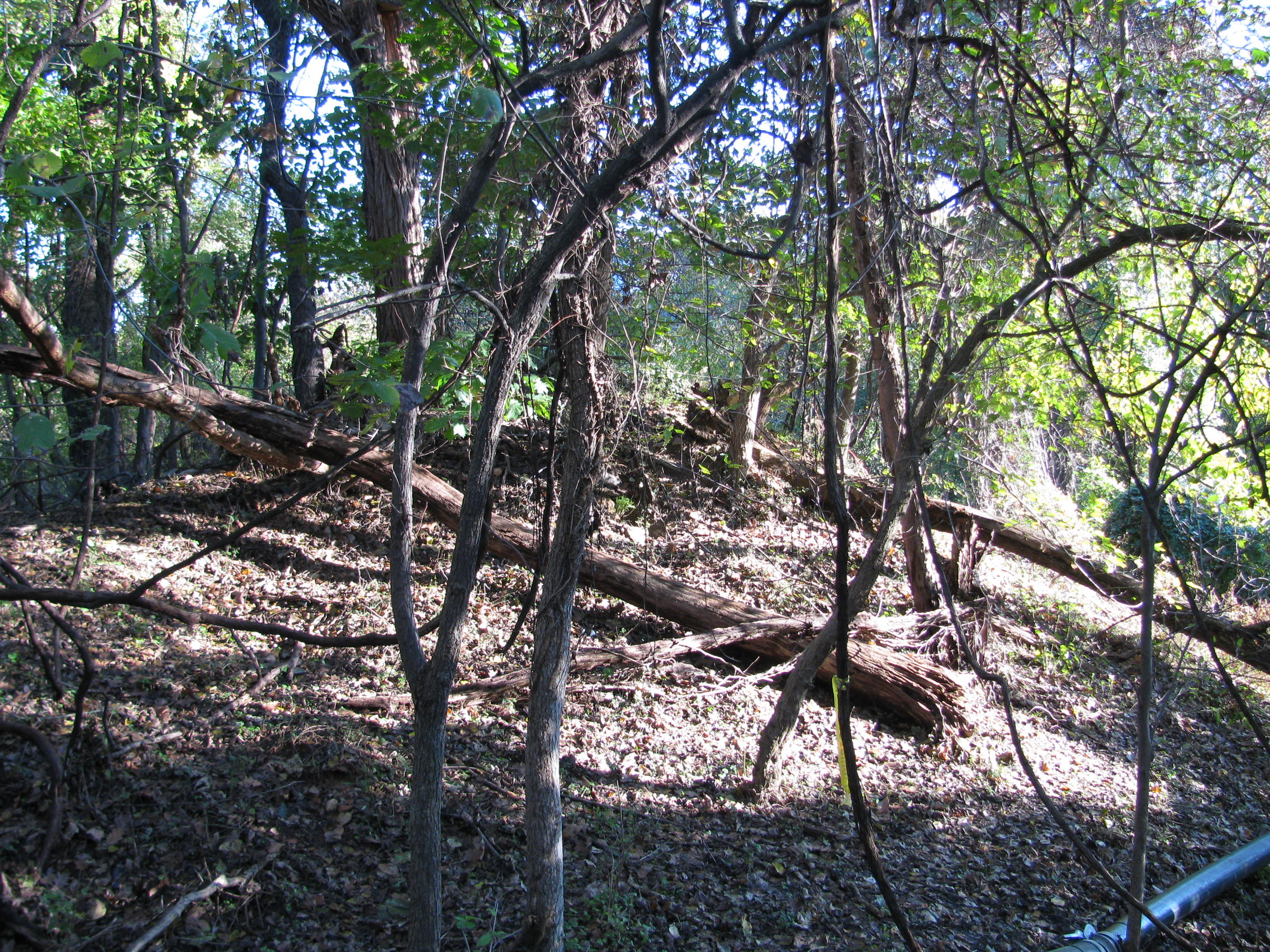
- Mound in the unexcavated site (2011)

- Location within Washington, D.C.
- Location: Overlooking the Potomac River at MacArthur Boulevard and Foxhall Road
- Nearest city: Washington, D.C.
- Coordinates: 38°54′21″N 77°4′52″W
- Area: 1 acre (0.40 ha)
- NRHP reference No.: 82001714
- Added to NRHP: April 15, 1982

The Potomac Palisades Site is an archaeological site in Washington, D.C., United States. Measuring about 1 acre (0.40 ha) in area, the site lies near the intersection of MacArthur Boulevard and Foxhall Road, along the Potomac River. It is one of many archaeological sites in the present-day Potomac Palisades; a 1984 field survey revealed evidence that supported earlier ideas of the archaeological richness of the northern bank of the Potomac in this area.

Among the artifacts found during excavation at the site is a triangle-shaped projectile point. The primary use of the site appears to have been during the Late Archaic period, during which time it was heavily used as a lithic workshop. In recognition of its archaeological value, the Potomac Palisades Site was listed on the National Register of Historic Places in 1982.
