= Robert and Lillie May Stone House =

Historic house in Washington, D.C., United States

- U.S. National Register of Historic Places
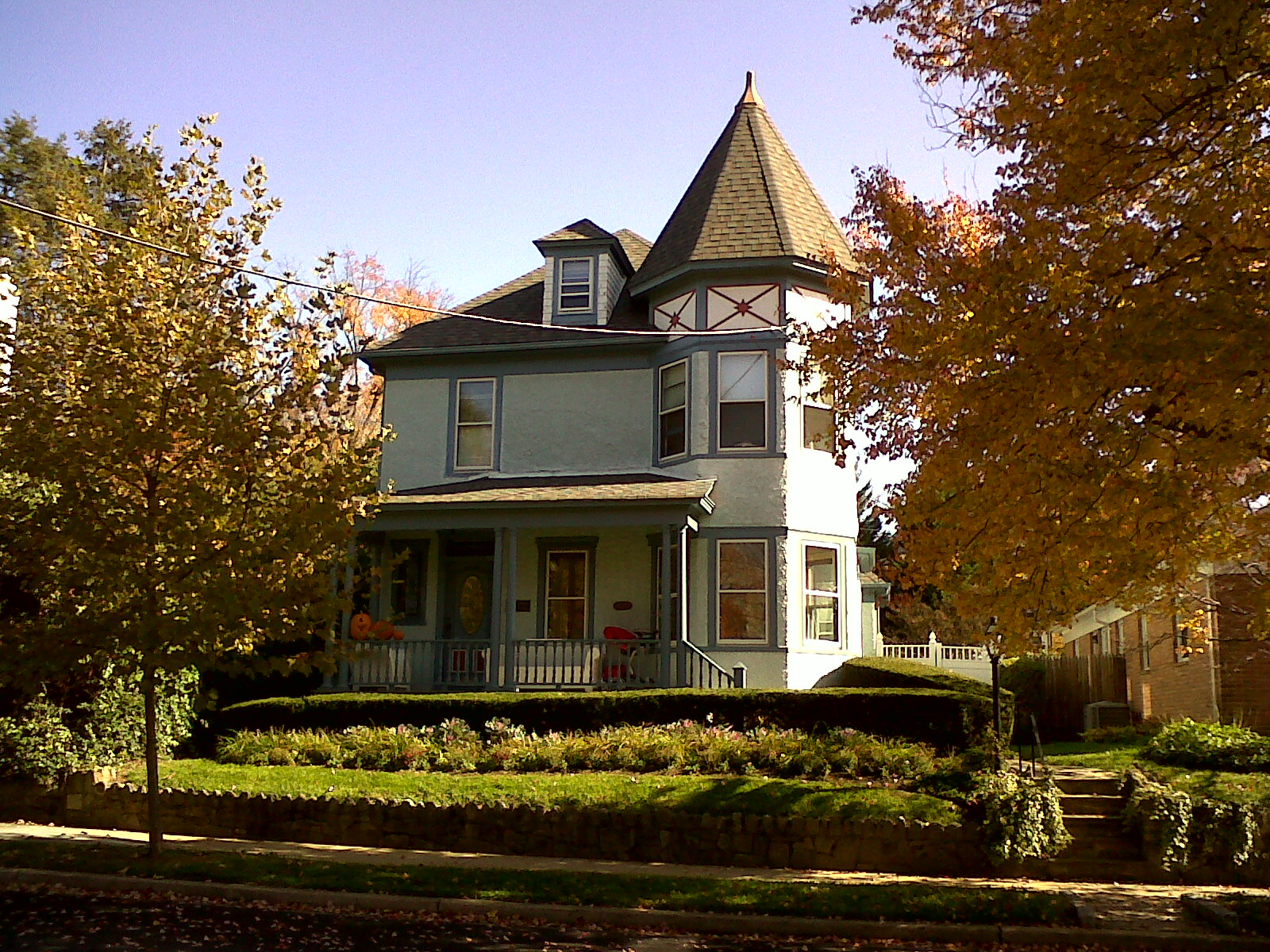

- Location within District of Columbia
- Location: 4900 47th Street, N.W. Washington, D.C.
- Coordinates: 38°57′13″N 77°5′32″W
- Architectural style: Victorian
- MPS: American University Park in Washington, D.C.: Its Early Houses, Pre-Civil War to 1911
- NRHP reference No.: 11000380
- Added to NRHP: June 27, 2011

The Robert and Lillie May Stone House is a historic Victorian home, located at 4900 47th Street, Northwest, Washington, D.C., in the American University Park neighborhood.

It was added to the National Register of Historic Places in 2011.
