= Peirce Still House =

Historic house in Washington, D.C., United States

- U.S. National Register of Historic Places
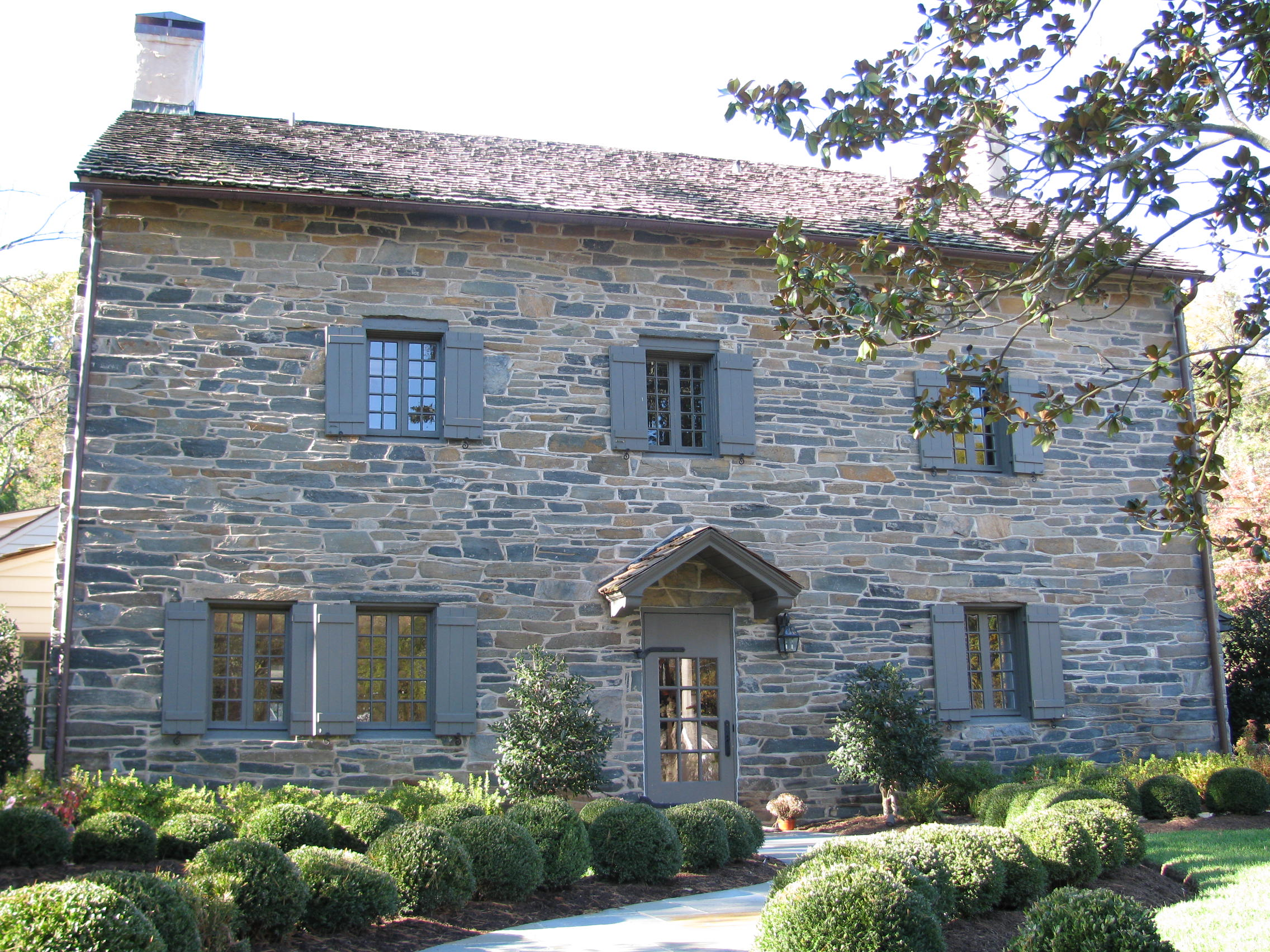
- Peirce Still House in 2011

- Location within District of Columbia
- Location: 2400 Tilden Street, N.W., Washington, District of Columbia
- Coordinates: 38°56′25″N 77°3′10″W
- Built: 1811
- NRHP reference No.: 90001295
- Added to NRHP: September 6, 1990

The Peirce Still House is an historic building located next to Rock Creek Park, at 2400 Tilden Street, Northwest, Washington, D.C.

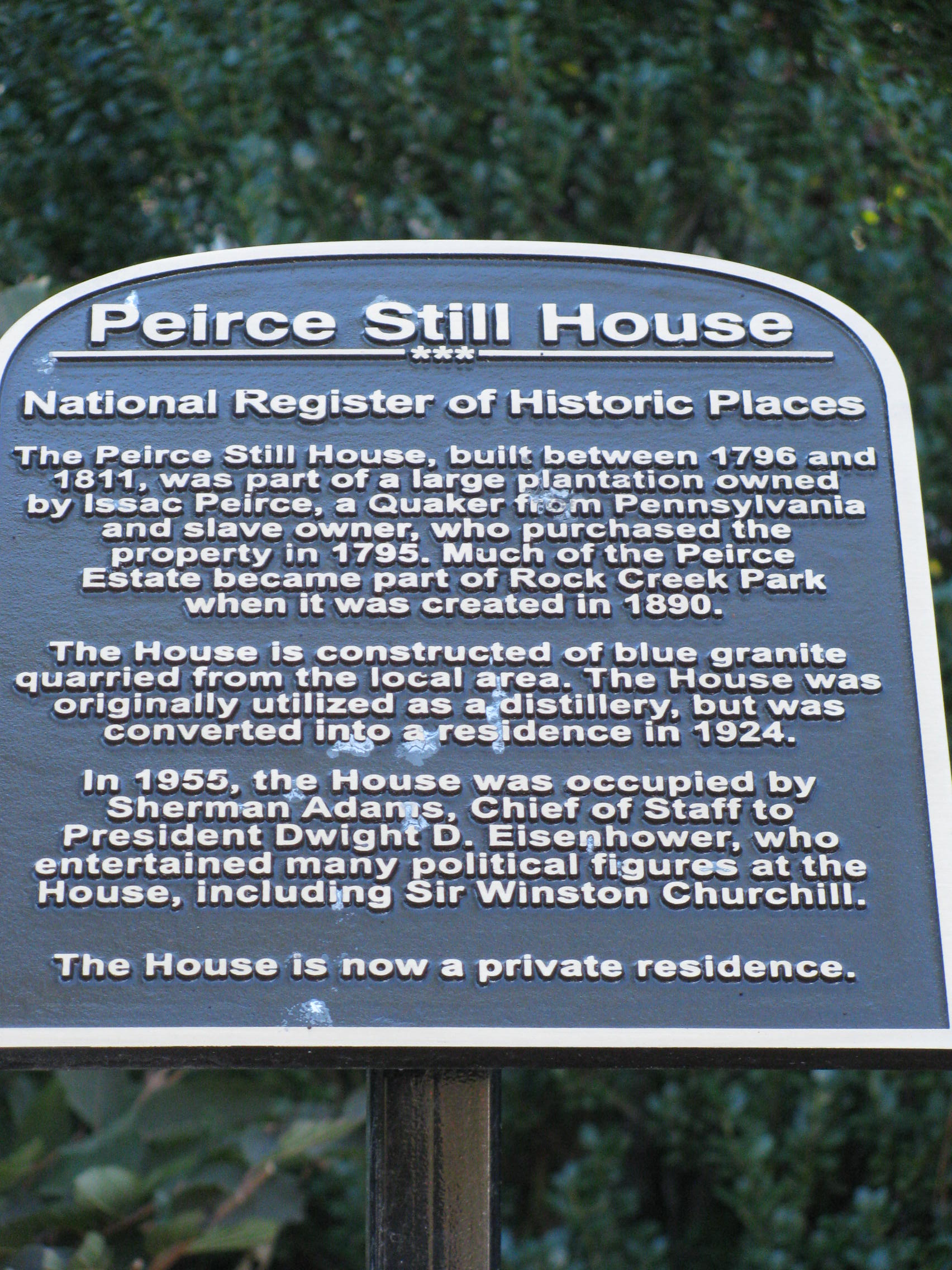

The stone house was a distillery, built for Isaac Peirce. In 1924, it was converted to a home.
