= Glen Hurst =

Historic house in Washington, D.C., United States

- U.S. National Register of Historic Places
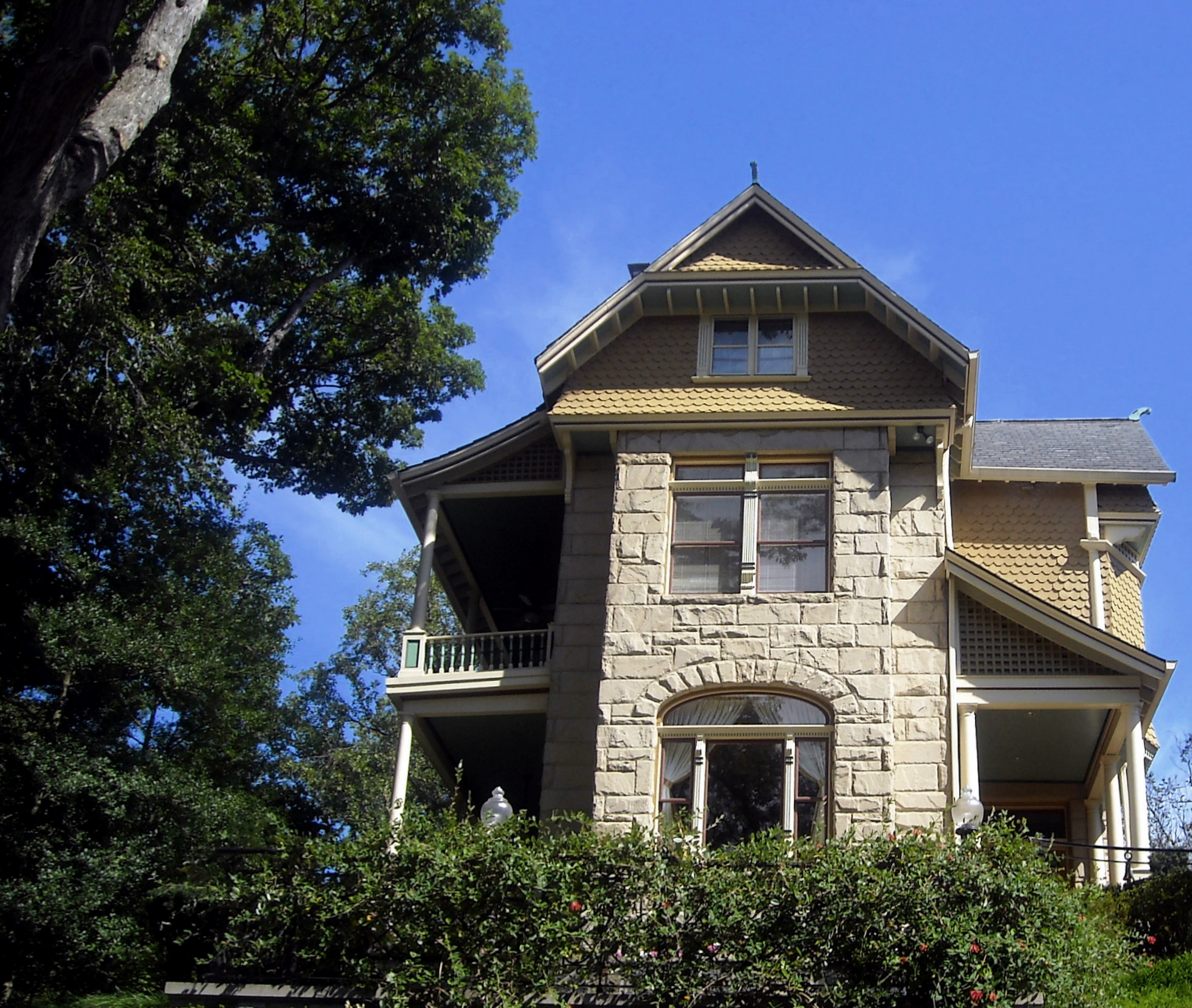
- Glen Hurst in 2008

- Location within District of Columbia
- Location: 4933 MacArthur Boulevard, NW; Washington, D.C.
- Coordinates: 38°55′15.33″N 77°5′54.58″W
- Area: 0.5 acres (0.20 ha)
- Built: 1892
- Architect: Richard Ough
- Architectural style: Queen Anne
- NRHP reference No.: 05000336
- Added to NRHP: June 1, 2005

Glen Hurst is a historic house, located at 4933 MacArthur Boulevard, Northwest, Washington, D.C., in the Palisades neighborhood.

== History ==
It was designed by Richard Ough in 1892, and built by John C. Hurst. The building is an example of Queen Anne style architecture. It is one of the five original houses in the Palisades.

It was added to the National Register of Historic Places on June 1, 2005.
