= Pierce House (Reading, Massachusetts) =

Historic house in Massachusetts, United States

- U.S. National Register of Historic Places
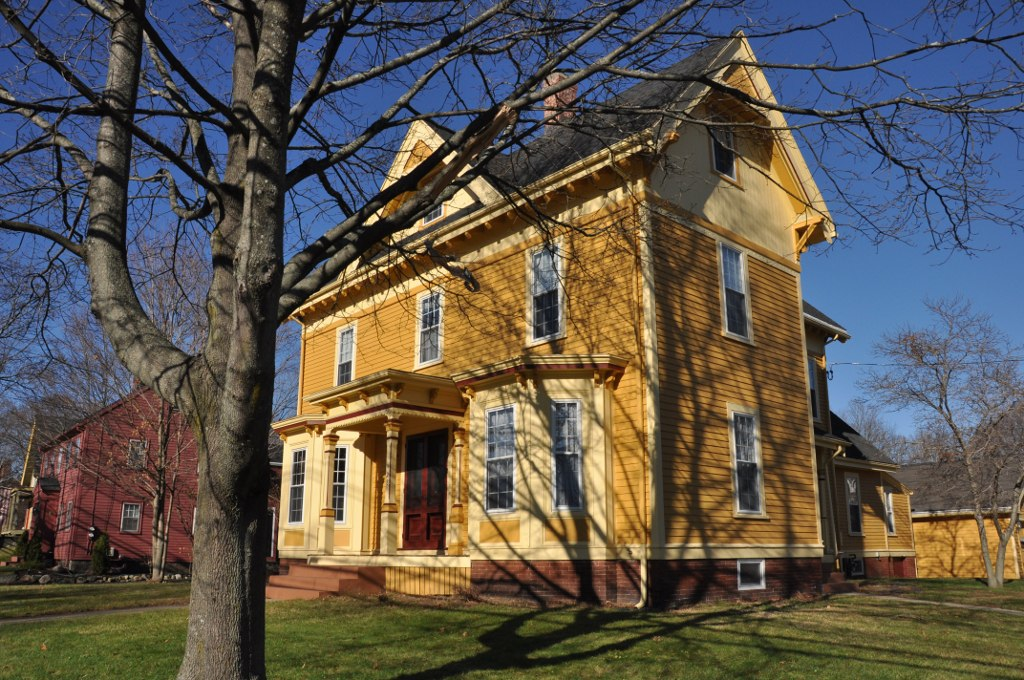

- Location within Massachusetts Location within the United States
- Location: Reading, Massachusetts
- Coordinates: 42°31′38″N 71°5′46″W
- Built: 1878
- Architect: Abbott, George
- Architectural style: Stick/Eastlake
- MPS: Reading MRA
- NRHP reference No.: 84002794
- Added to NRHP: July 19, 1984

The Pierce House is a historic house at 128 Salem Street in Reading, Massachusetts. The 2 1/2-story wood-frame house was built sometime between 1875 and 1880 for Samuel Pierce, owner of the nearby Pierce Organ Pipe Factory. The house has Stick style/Eastlake style features, including a steeply pitched gable roof with exposed rafter ends, and an elaborately decorated entry porch with square chamfered columns and brackets in the eaves.

The house was listed on the National Register of Historic Places in 1984.

== See also ==
- National Register of Historic Places listings in Reading, Massachusetts
- National Register of Historic Places listings in Middlesex County, Massachusetts
