= Hilleary T. Burrows House =

Historic house in Washington, D.C., United States

- U.S. National Register of Historic Places
- D.C. Inventory of Historic Sites
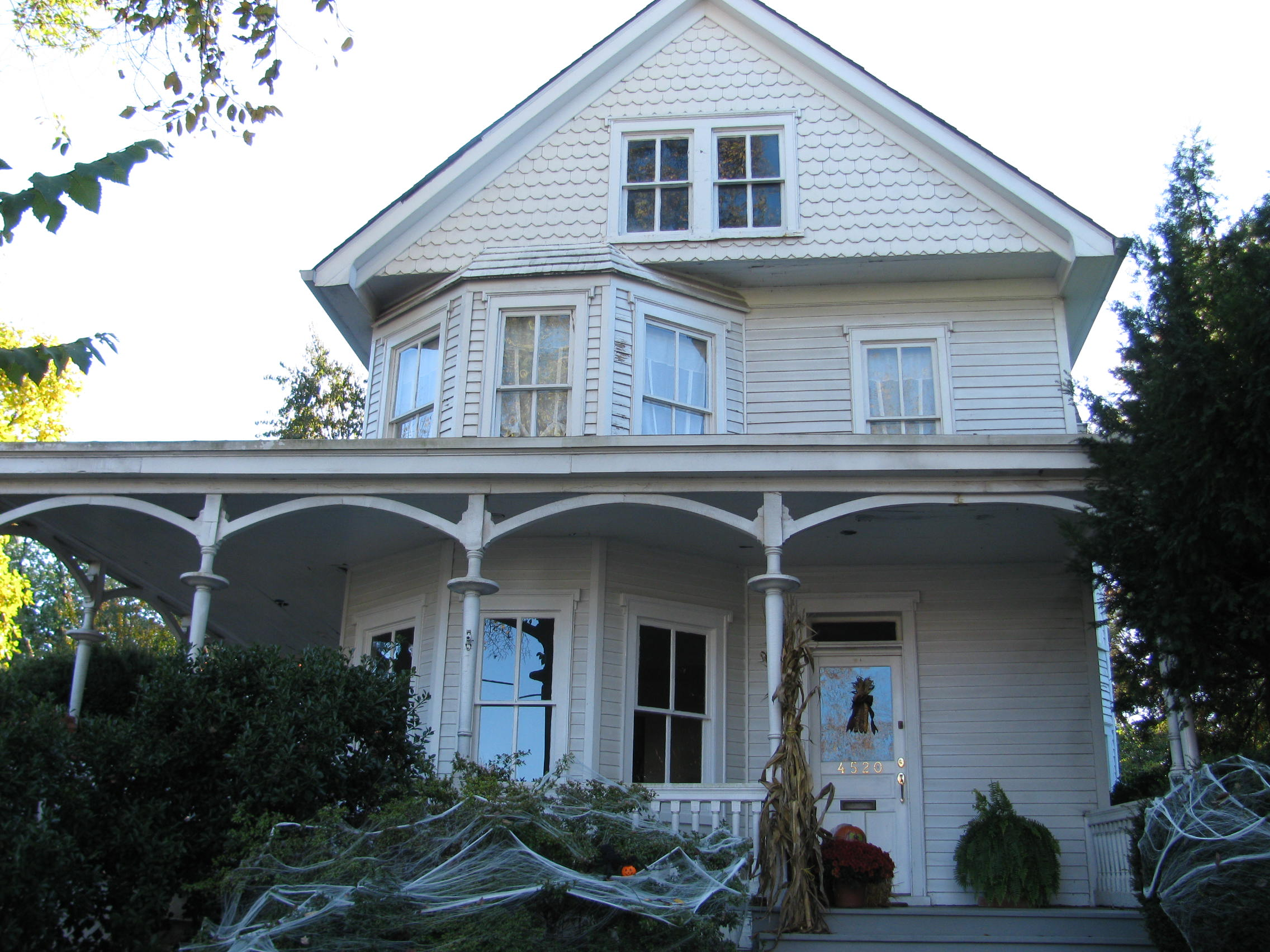

- Location within District of Columbia
- Location: 4520 River Road, N.W. Washington, D.C.
- Coordinates: 38°57′20″N 77°5′25″W
- Built: 1910
- Architectural style: Queen Anne
- MPS: American University Park in Washington, D.C.: Its Early Houses, Pre-Civil War to 1911 MPS
- NRHP reference No.: 11000377

Significant dates
- Added to NRHP: June 27, 2011
- Designated DCIHS: August 23, 2001

The Hilleary T. Burrows House is an historic Queen Anne style home, located at 4520 River Road, Northwest, Washington, D.C., west of Tenley Circle, in the Tenleytown neighborhood.

It was built in 1897, from H. Galloway Ten Eyck pattern book, by B. N. Burgoyne. It was added to the National Register of Historic Places in 2011.
