= Ponce de Leon Apartment Building =

- U.S. National Register of Historic Places
- D.C. Inventory of Historic Sites
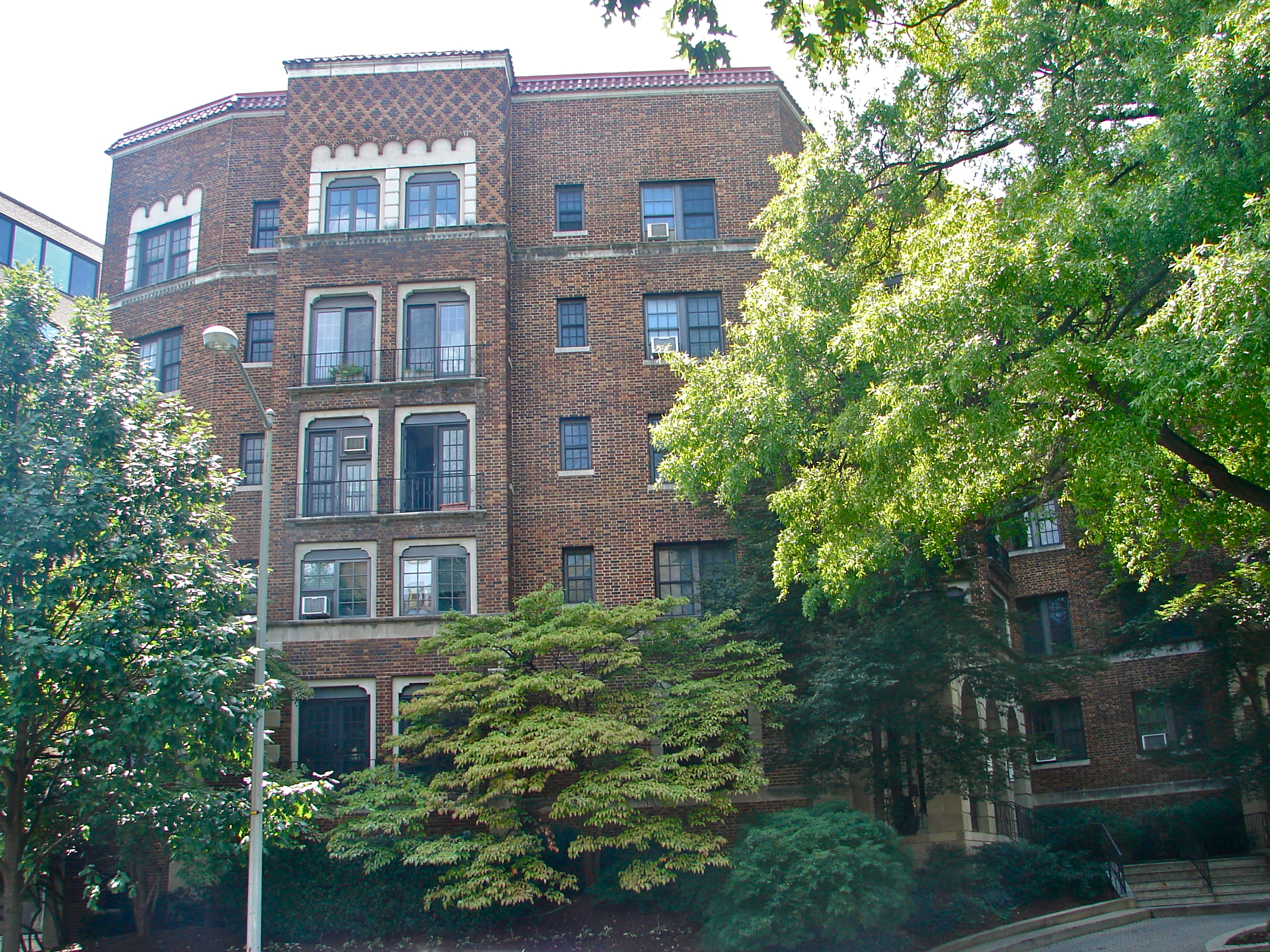

- Location within District of Columbia
- Location: 4514 Connecticut Ave., NW; Washington, D.C.
- Coordinates: 38°56′55″N 77°3′59″W
- Built: 1928
- Architect: David L. Stern
- Architectural style: Mission Revival; Spanish Revival
- MPS: Apartment Buildings in Washington, DC, MPS
- NRHP reference No.: 94001038

Significant dates
- Added to NRHP: September 7, 1994
- Designated DCIHS: January 17, 1990

The Ponce de Leon Apartment Building is a historic structure located in the North Cleveland Park neighborhood in the Northwest Quadrant of Washington, D.C. David L. Stern designed the structure in a combination of the Mission Revival and the Spanish Revival styles. The building was completed in 1928. It is an example of 1920s exoticism in a prominent apartment corridor in the city. The exterior features diapered brickwork, terra cotta tile roof, limestone portico and trim, and Moorish arch motifs. The interior features an intact lobby with a decorative plaster ceiling and a terrazzo floor. It was listed on the National Register of Historic Places in 1994.
