= Georgetown Market =

- U.S. National Register of Historic Places
- D.C. Inventory of Historic Sites
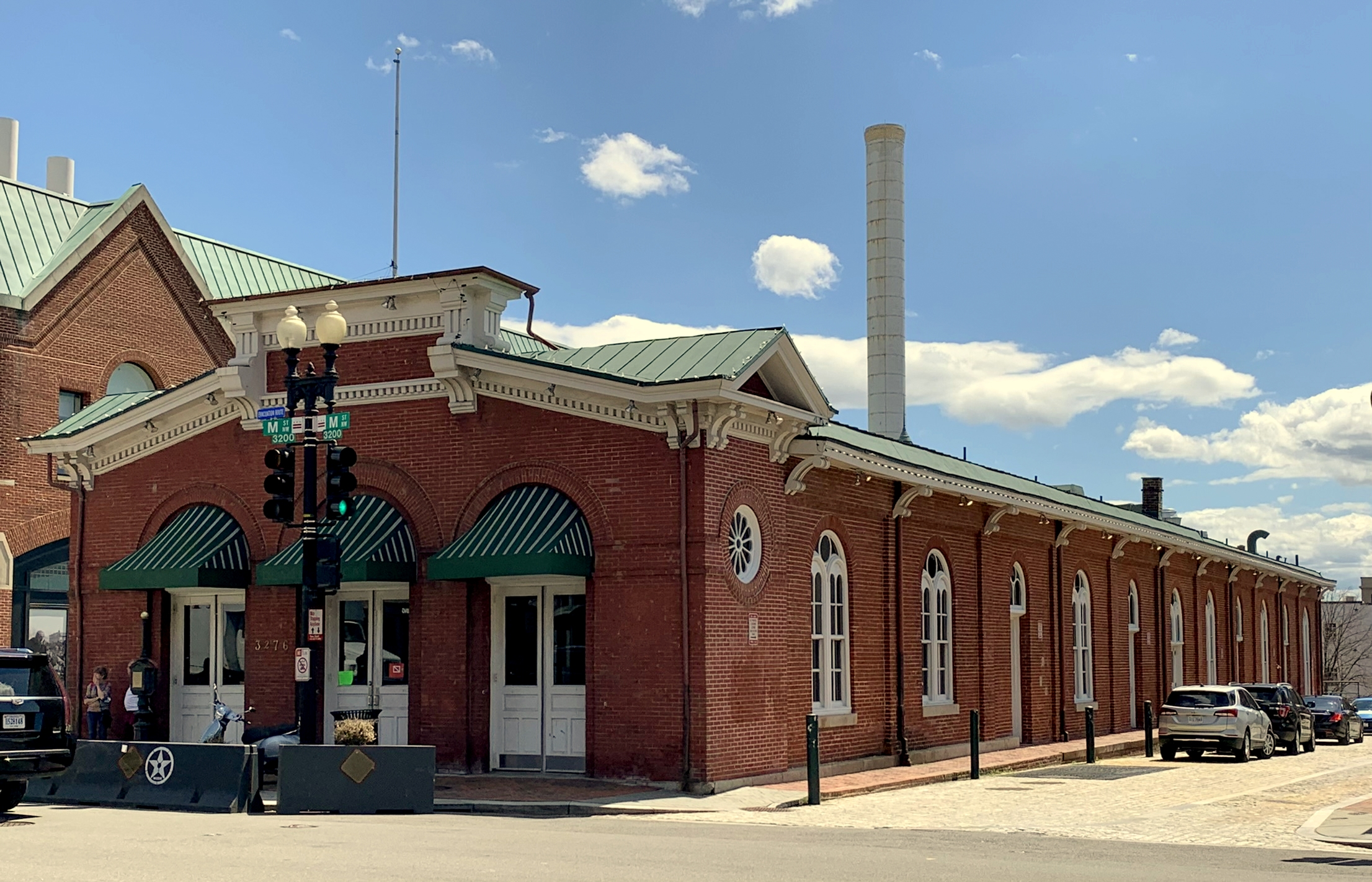
- Georgetown Market in 2022

- Location within Washington, D.C.
- Location: 3276 M Street, NW; Washington, D.C.
- Coordinates: 38°54′17.8″N 77°3′54.6″W
- Area: 0.2 acres (0.081 ha)
- Built: 1865
- Part of: Georgetown, Washington, D.C. (ID67000025)
- NRHP reference No.: 71001000

Significant dates
- Added to NRHP: May 6, 1971
- Designated DCIHS: November 8, 1964

The Georgetown Market is an historic building constructed in 1865, on the site of a market dating to 1795. It is located at 3276 M Street, Northwest, Washington, D.C., in the Georgetown neighborhood.

The Georgetown Corporation operated the market until incorporated into the District of Columbia. On September 11, 1966, the Congress passed preservation legislation.

== See also ==
- National Register of Historic Places listings in the District of Columbia
