= Samuel and Harriet Burrows House =

Historic house in Washington, D.C., United States

- U.S. National Register of Historic Places
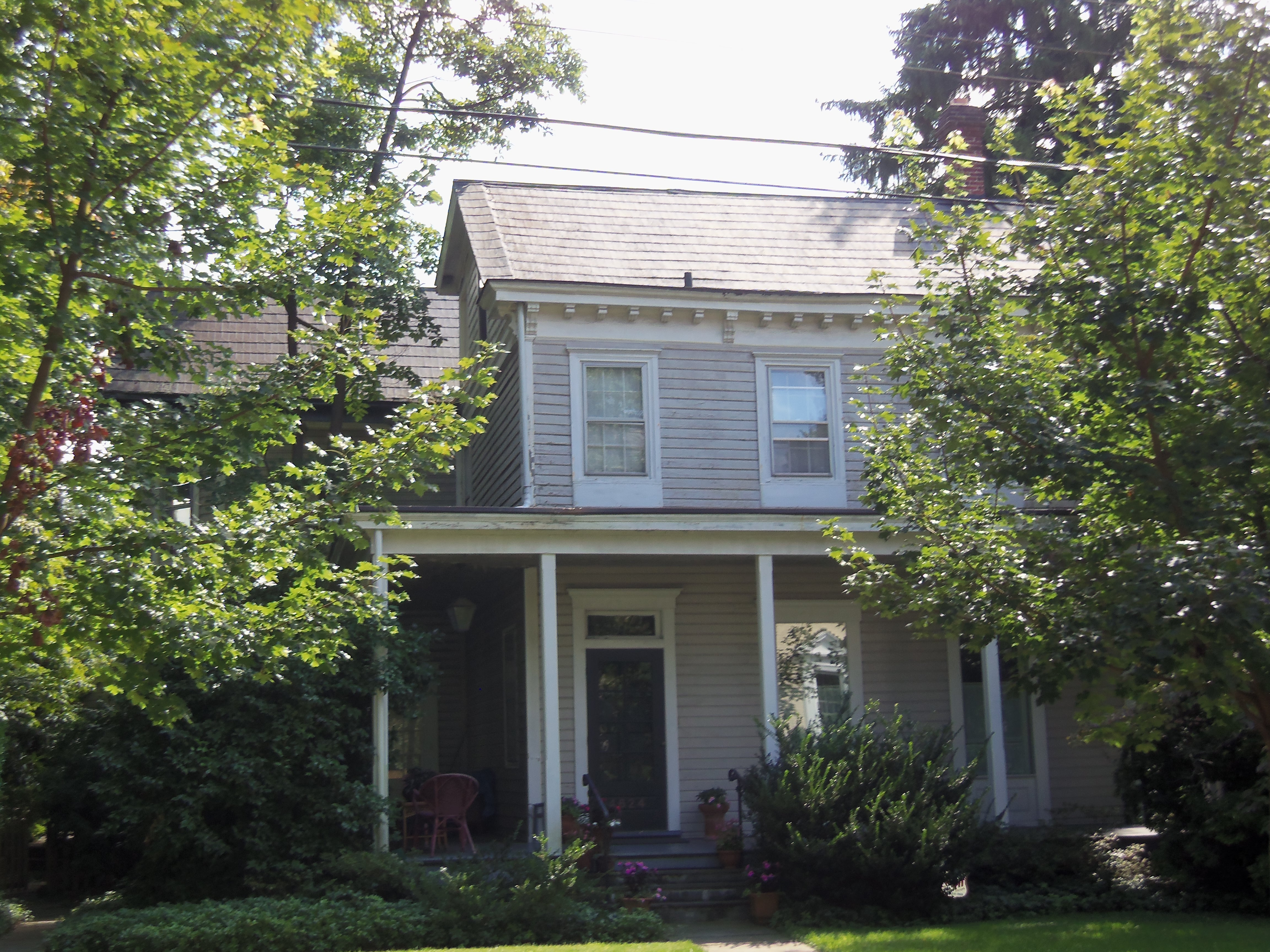

- Location within the District of Columbia Location within the United States
- Location: 4624 Verplanck Place, N.W. Washington, D.C.
- Coordinates: 38°56′37″N 77°5′30″W
- Architectural style: vernacular
- MPS: American University Park in Washington, D.C.: Its Early Houses, Pre-Civil War to 1911 MPS
- NRHP reference No.: 11000378
- Added to NRHP: June 27, 2011

The Samuel and Harriet Burrows House is a historic vernacular style home, located at 4624 Verplanck Place, Northwest, Washington, D.C., in the Tenleytown neighborhood.

== History ==
It was the home of Samuel Burrows and Harriet America Shekell. They were married in 1849. In 1857, they purchased property along River Road where they rebuilt the existing house. Mrs. Burrows met President Abraham Lincoln, when he came to review the troops at Fort Bayard. It was originally located near the corner of 45th Street, and Ellicott Street. It was moved in 1924. It was added to the National Register of Historic Places in 2011.
