= Pierce Springhouse and Barn =

- Peirce Springhouse and Barn
- U.S. National Register of Historic Places
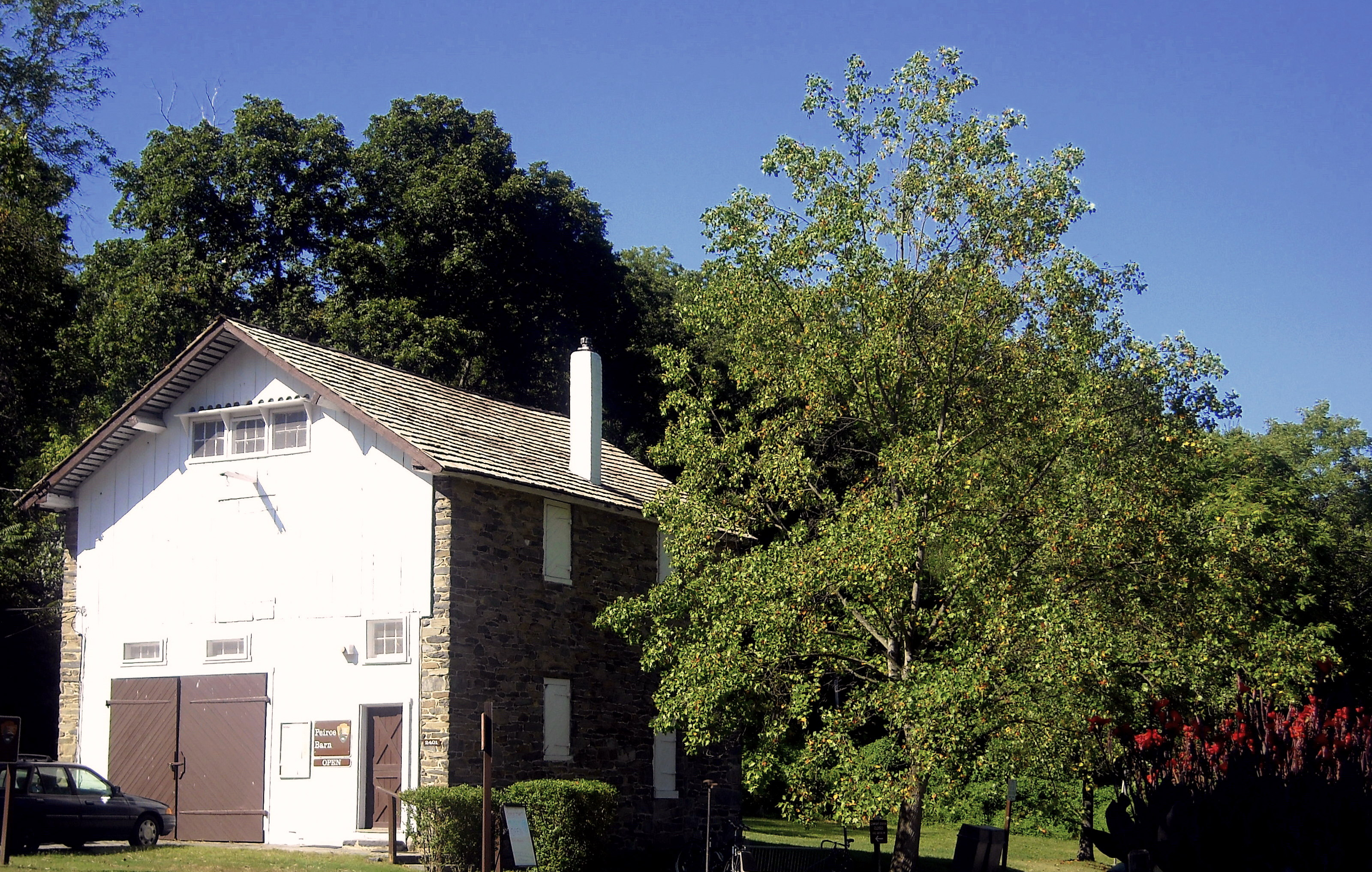
- Pierce Barn in 2008

- Location within District of Columbia
- Location: Tilden Street and Beach Drive, N.W., Washington, District of Columbia
- Coordinates: 38°56′24″N 77°3′8″W
- Built: 1820
- NRHP reference No.: 73000222
- Added to NRHP: October 25, 1973

The Pierce Springhouse and Barn, also known as the Art Barn, is an historic barn and springhouse located in Rock Creek Park, at Tilden Street and Beach Drive, Northwest, Washington, D.C.

== History ==
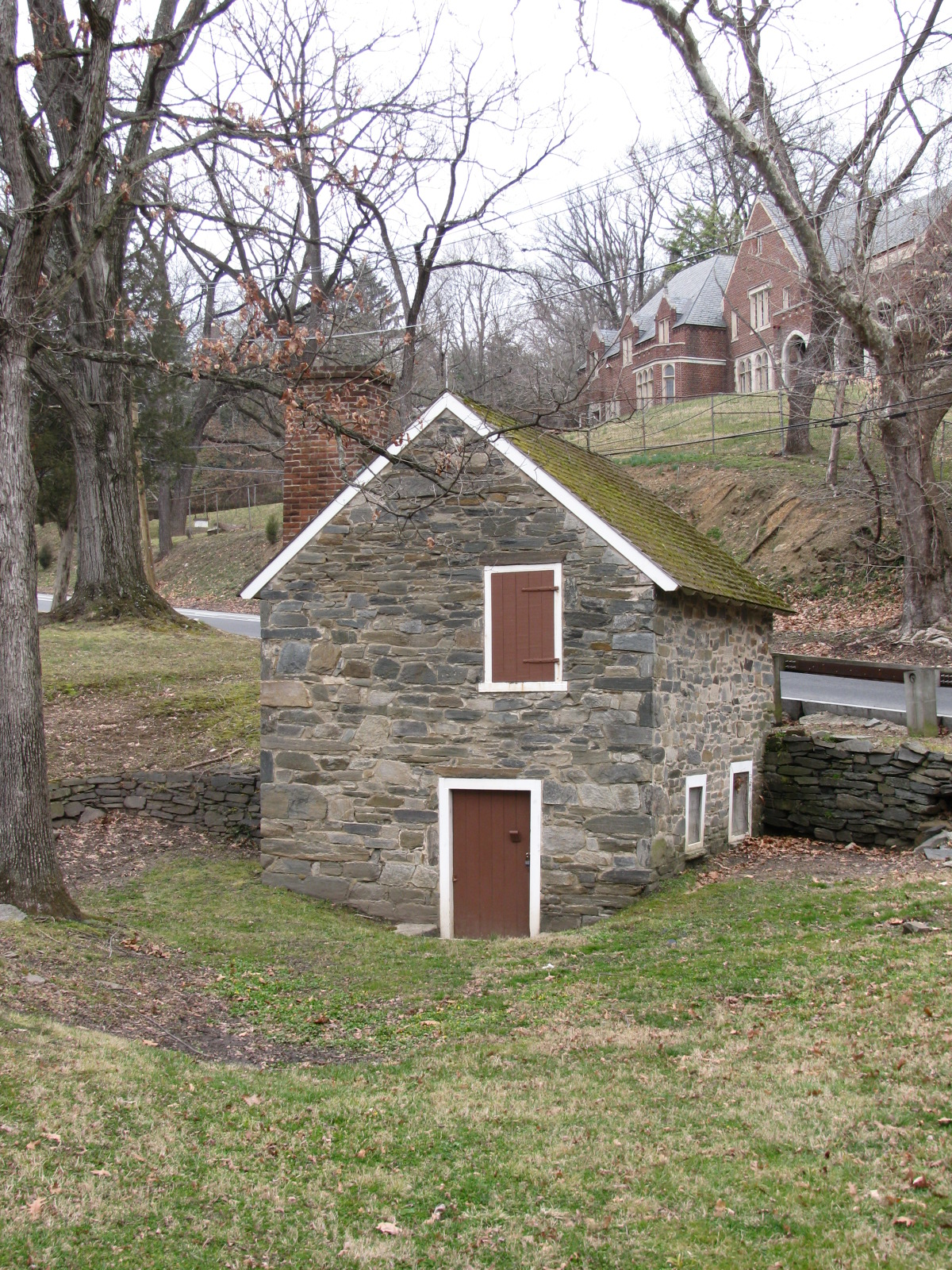
Pierce springhouse in 2013

The springhouse, built in 1801, is located in the median of Tilden Street west of the barn.

Issac Peirce built the barn for his farm complex.

In 1971, the barn was used as an Art Gallery, operated by Associates of Artists Equity. David Major, a counterintelligence adviser at the Reagan White House, ran a spy tour that claimed the pigeon coop of the barn (above the art gallery) was used to spy on the nearby Hungarian and Czechoslovak embassies.

== See also ==
- Rock Creek Park
