= Foxhall (Washington, D.C.) =

Neighborhood in Washington, D.C.

- Foxhall Village Historic District
- U.S. National Register of Historic Places
- U.S. Historic district
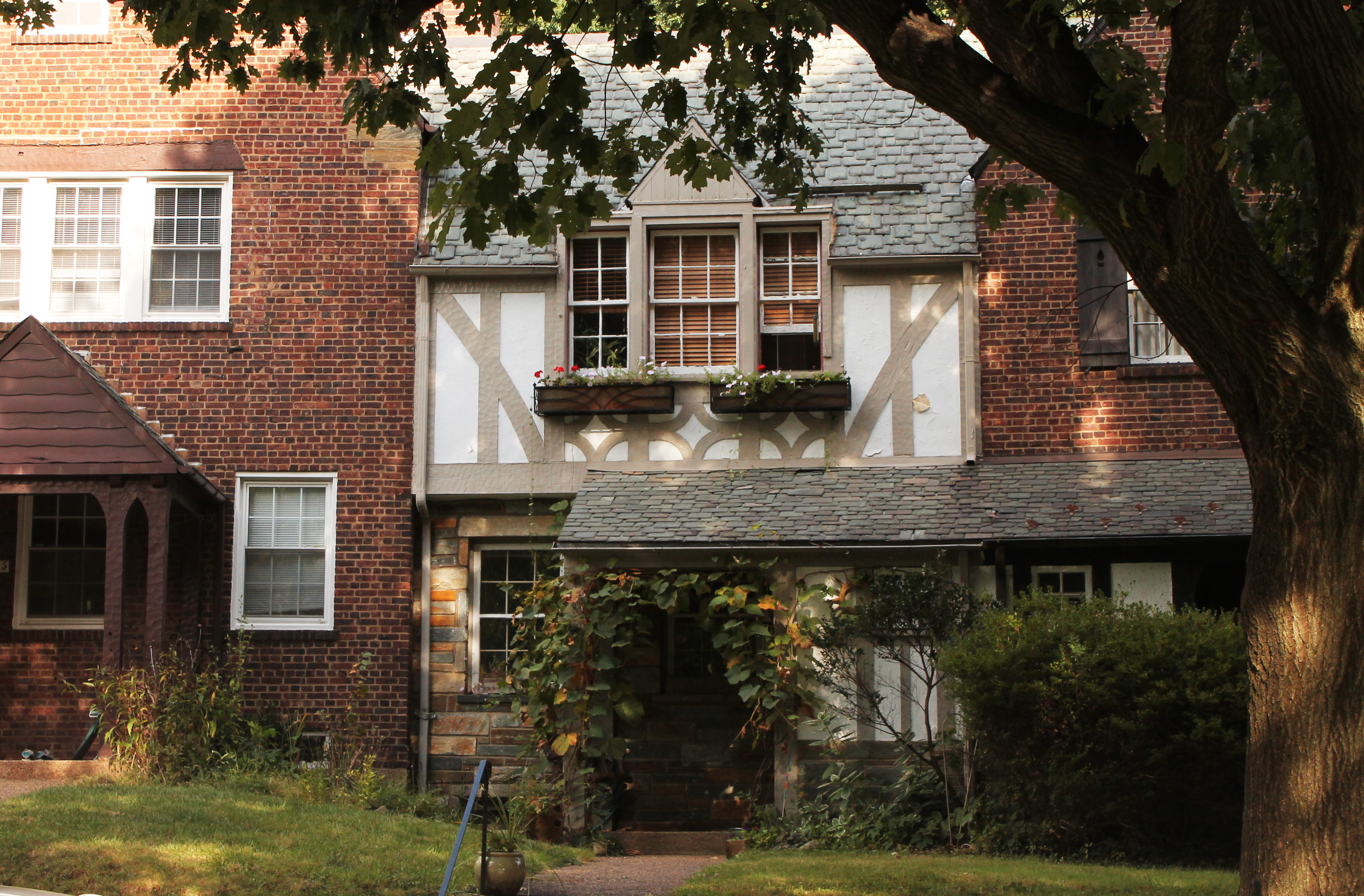
- Tudor-Style Row Houses in Foxhall (2014)

- Map of Washington, D.C., with Foxhall highlighted in maroon
- Location: Bounded by Reservoir Rd. NW, Glover-Archbold Park, P St. NW & Foxhall Rd. NW. Washington, D.C.
- Coordinates: 38°55′19.9″N 77°5′39.9″W
- Architectural style: Tudor Revival
- NRHP reference No.: 07001221
- Added to NRHP: November 29, 2007

Foxhall, also known as Foxhall Village, is a neighborhood in northwestern Washington, D.C., bordered by Reservoir Road on the north side, Foxhall Road on the west, Glover-Archbold Park on the east, and P Street NW on the south (with some properties south of P Street). The first homes were constructed along Reservoir Road and Greenwich Park Way in the mid-1920s. By the end of December, 1927, some 150 homes had been erected, and the community given the name of Foxhall Village.

Foxhall is mostly residential. Architecturally Foxhall is distinct, because the vast majority of the homes are a brick Tudor style. It was listed on the National Register of Historic Places in 2007. The neighborhood's namesake is Georgetown mayor Henry Foxall.

== Gallery ==
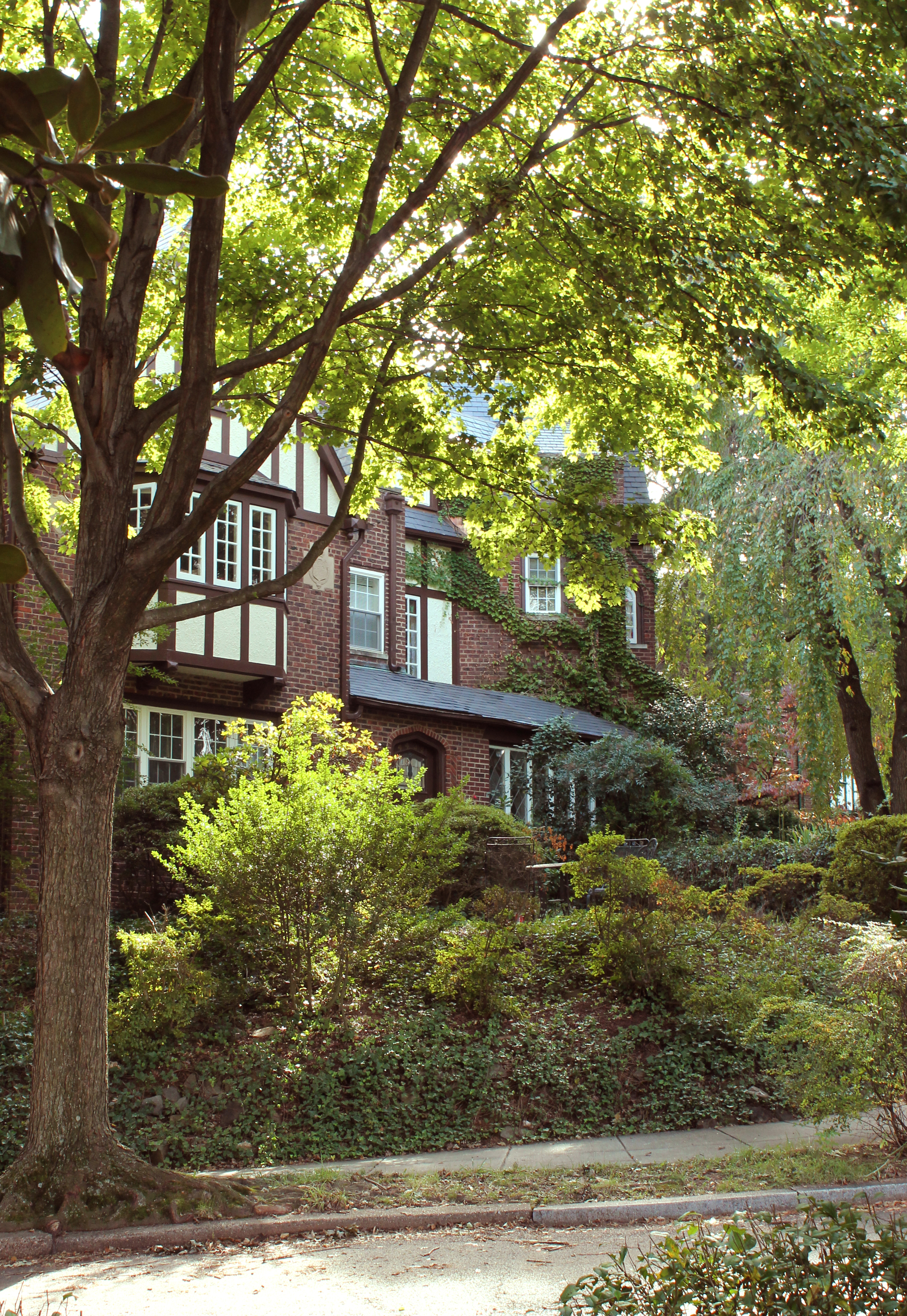
Houses in 2014

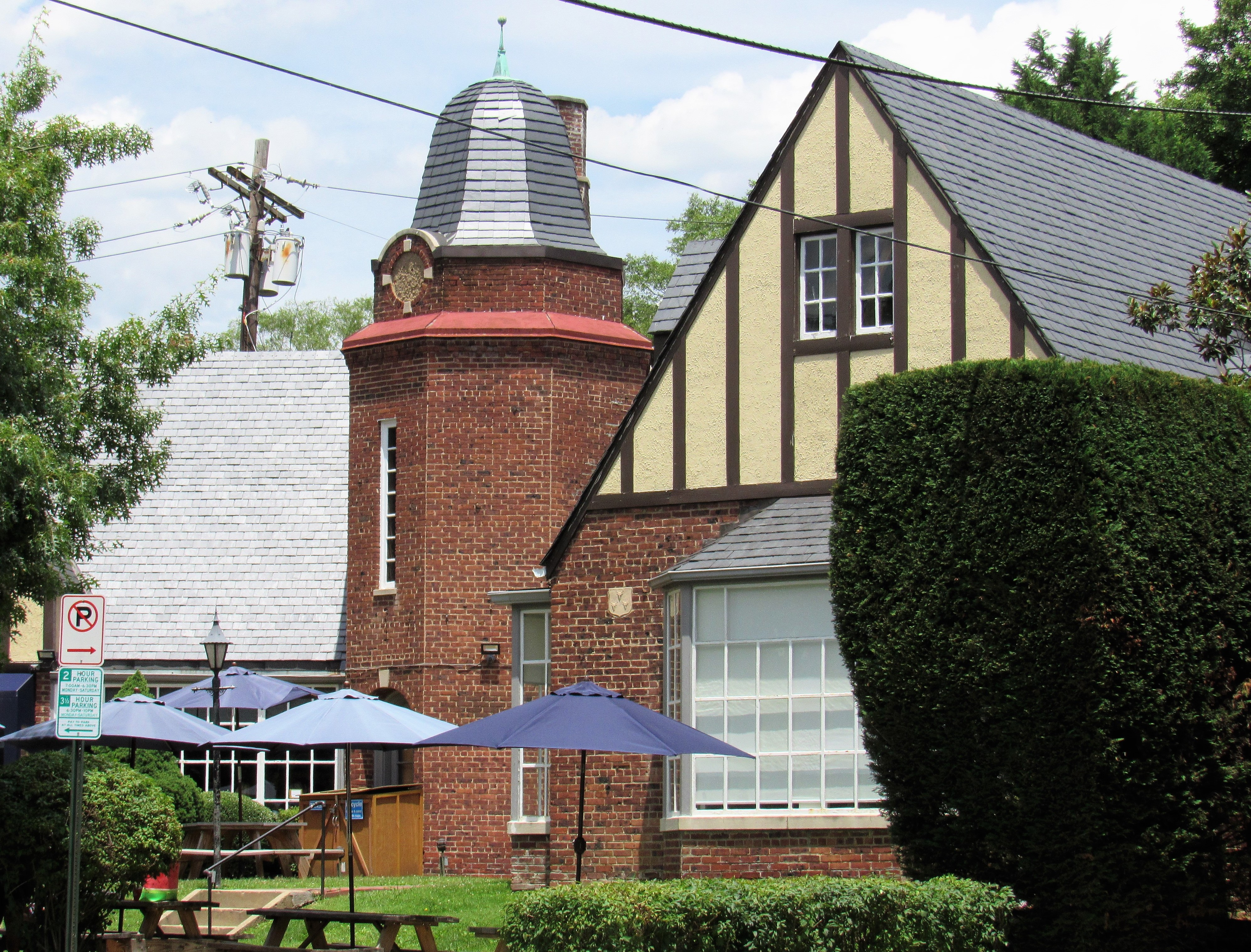
Houses in 2019

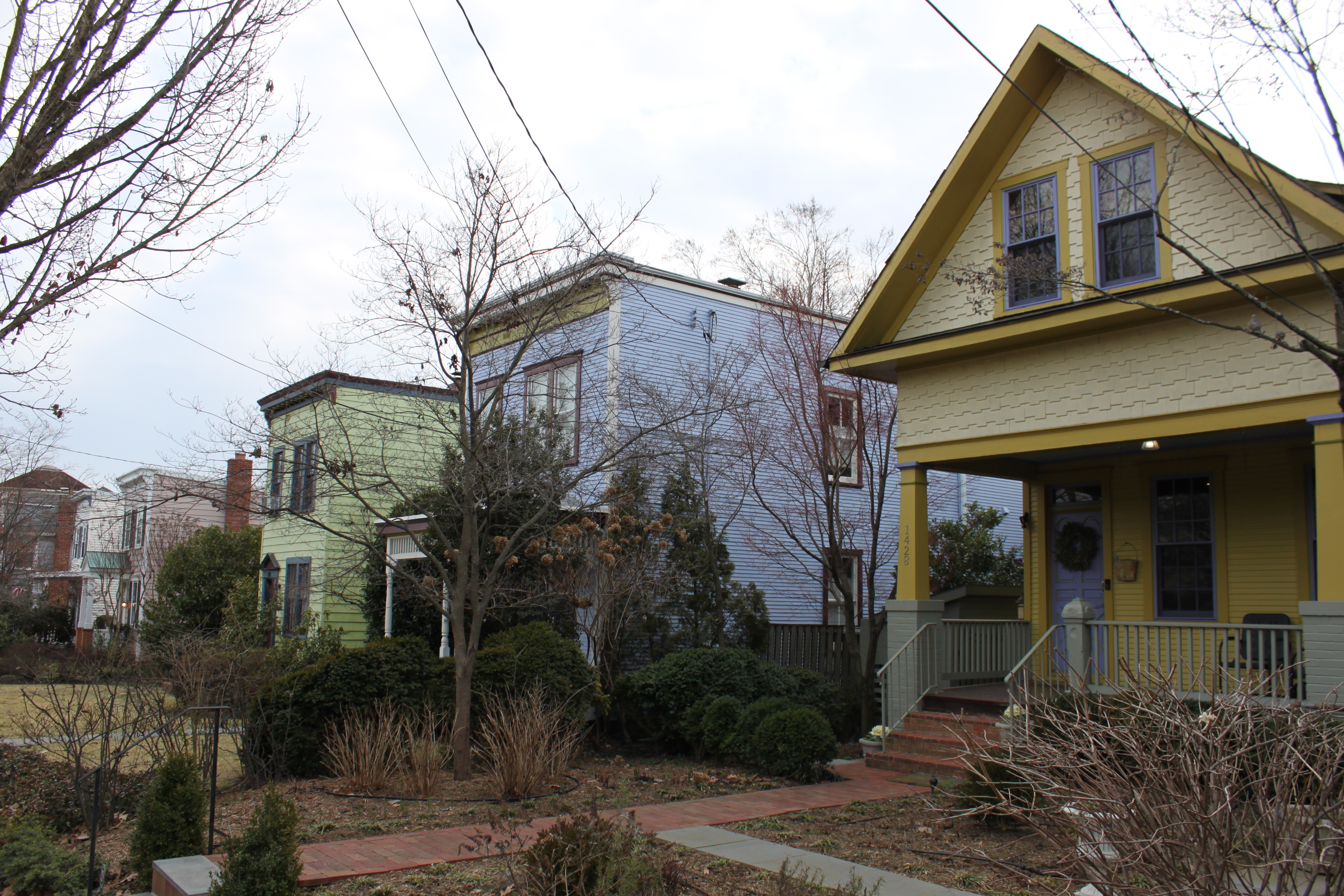
Houses on Foxhall Road in 2022

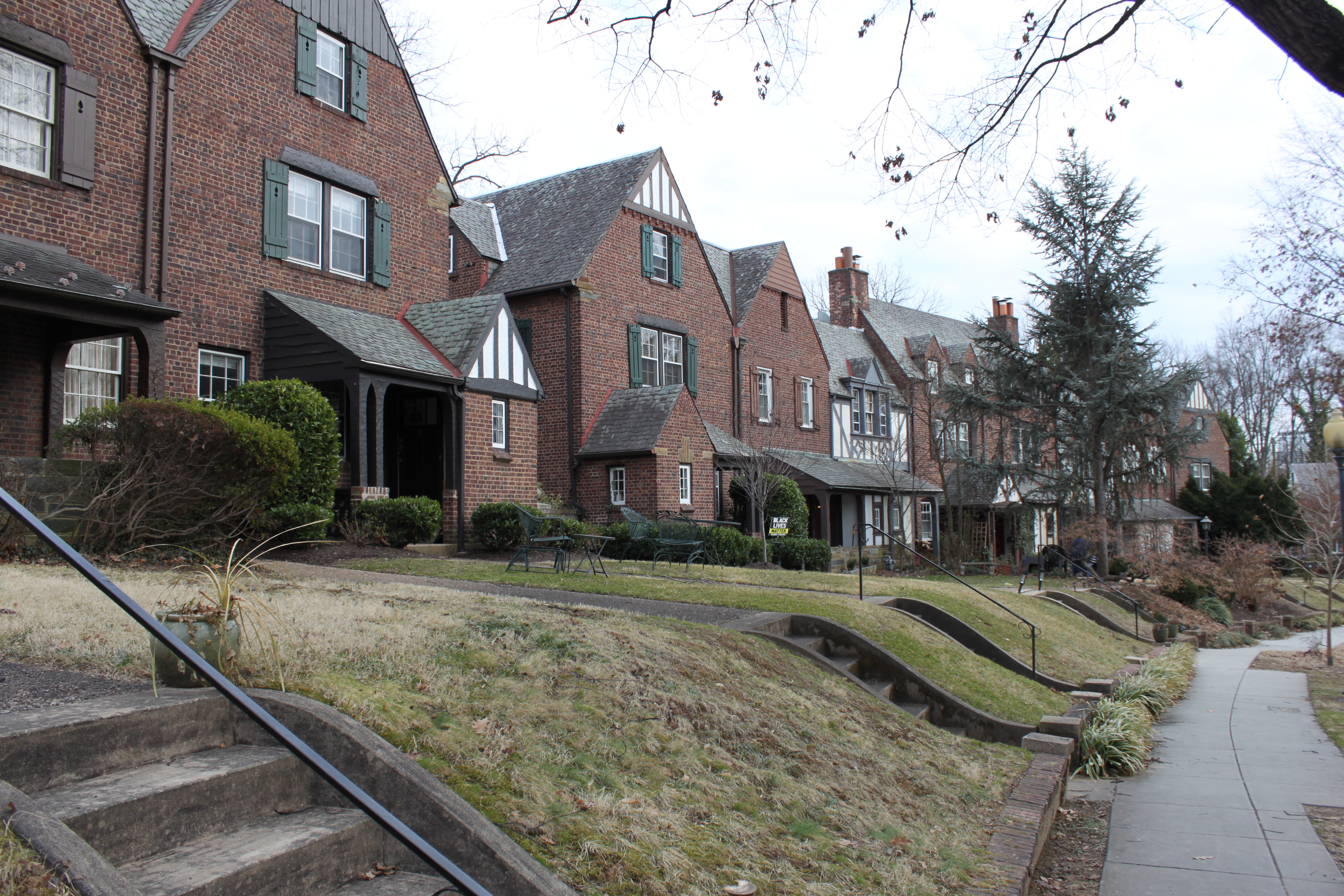
Houses on 44th St NW in 2022

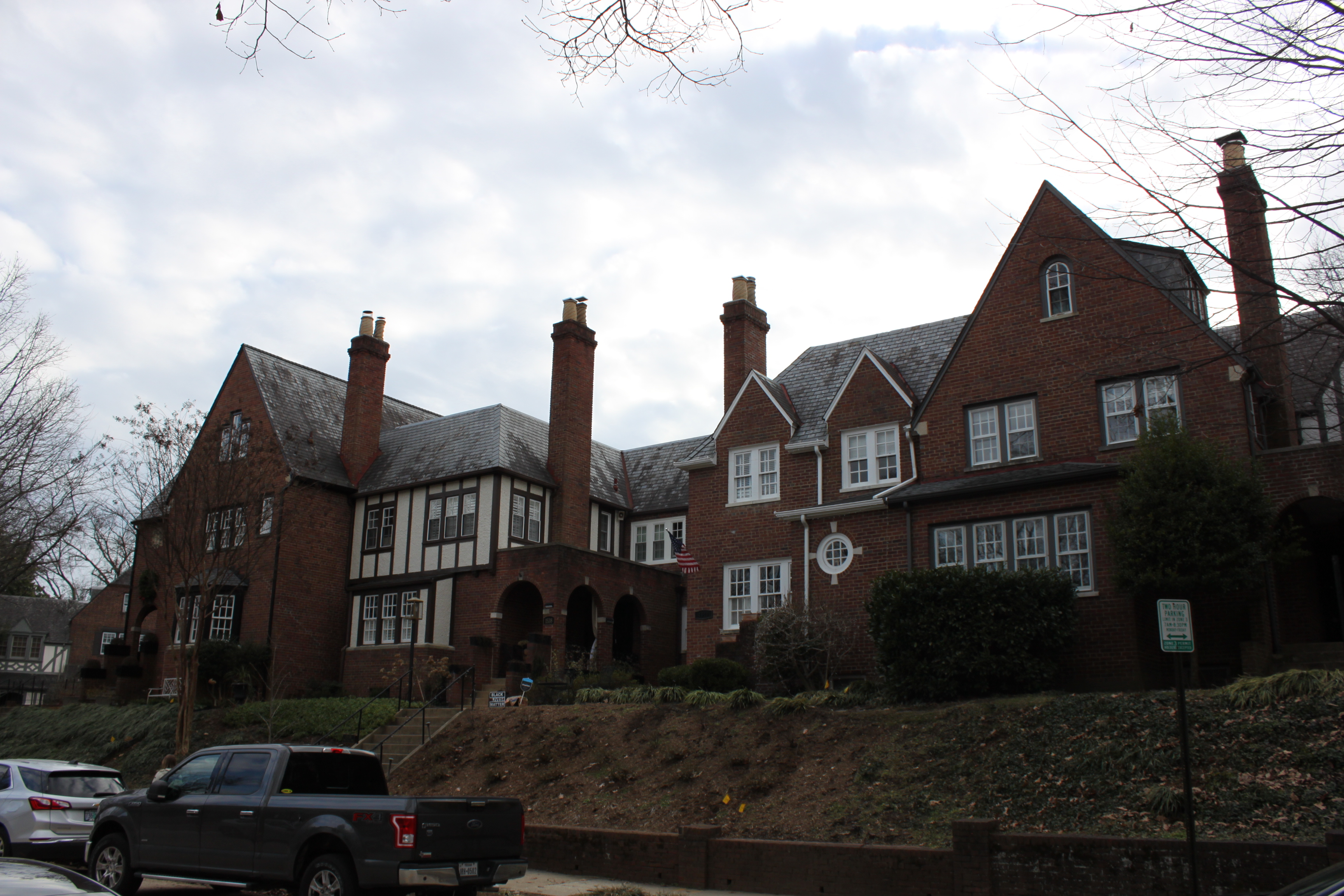
Houses with 'Foxhall chimneys' on 44th St NW in 2022
