= Tenley Campus =

- Immaculata Seminary Historic District
- U.S. National Register of Historic Places
- U.S. Historic district
- D.C. Inventory of Historic Sites
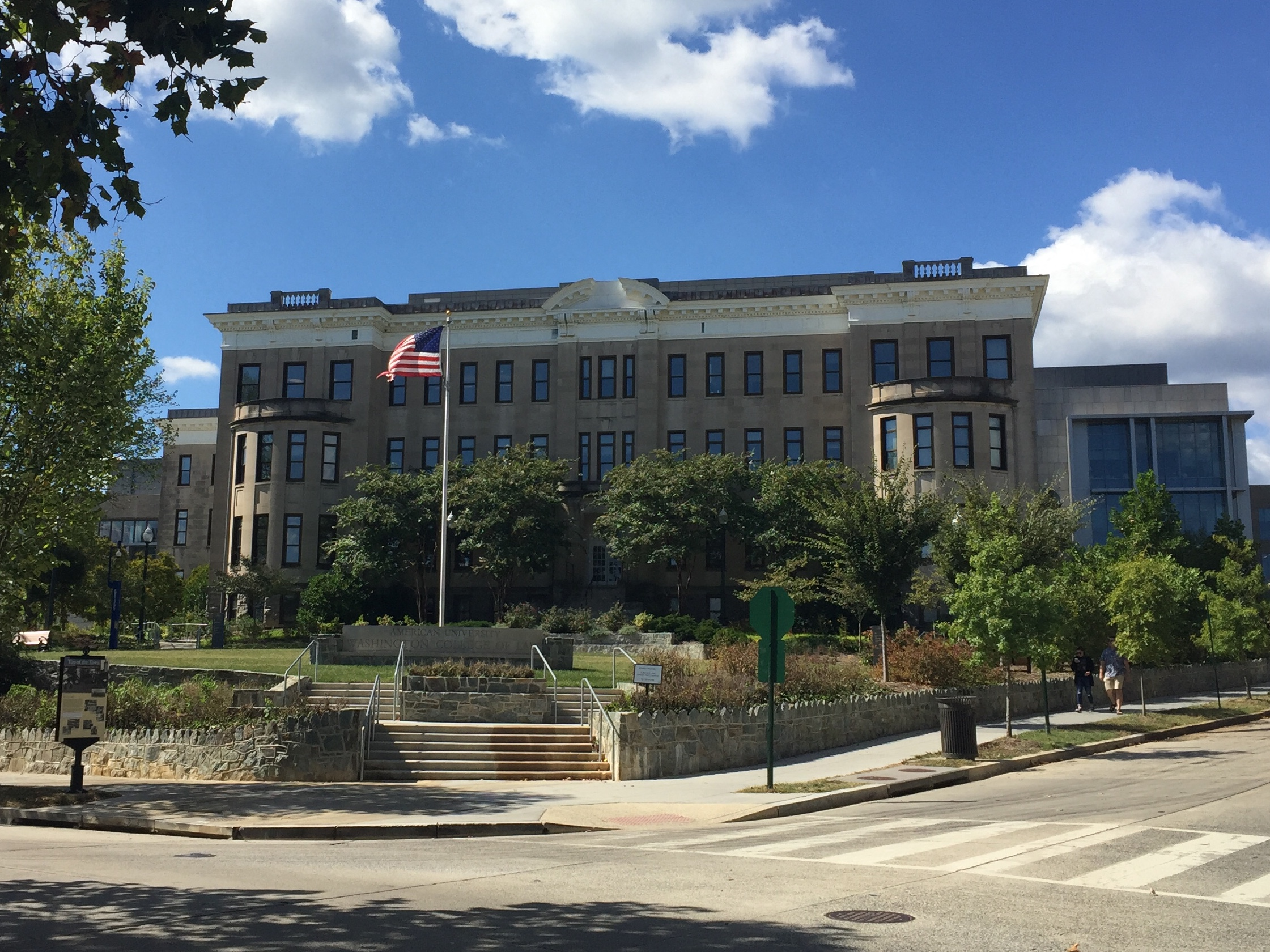
- WCL's Capital Building, the former Immaculata Seminary, from Tenley Circle in 2019

- Location within District of Columbia Location within the United States
- Location: 4300 Nebraska Avenue NW, Washington, D.C., United States
- Coordinates: 38°56′44″N 77°04′50″W
- Area: 8.2 acres (3.3 ha)
- Built: c. 1839–2016
- Website: Official website
- NRHP reference No.: 14000209

Significant dates
- Added to NRHP: May 19, 2014
- Designated DCIHS: October 27, 2011

The Immaculata Seminary Historic District, commonly known as Tenley Campus, is an 8.2-acre (3.3 ha) parcel of land, located off of Tenley Circle in the Northwest Washington, D.C. neighborhood of Tenleytown. The site of Dunblane, an early to mid-nineteenth-century Federal/Greek Revival-style manor house, it was once part of a large country estate on the outskirts of the capital city, owned by a succession of prominent Georgetown residents. From 1904 to 1906, the land was acquired by the Catholic Sisters of Providence of Saint Mary-of-the-Woods, who, for decades, operated all-girls primary, secondary, and postsecondary schools there under the Immaculata name, before being forced to shutter due to financial issues. Since 1986, it has been a satellite campus of American University, which purchased the site in part because of its proximity to Tenleytown station on the Red Line of the Washington Metro. It currently houses the school's Washington College of Law (WCL).

The district reflects Tenleytown's evolution from a rural Washington County community to a densely populated streetcar suburb, as well as the Catholic Church's role in education, particularly of women, during the twentieth century. It was added to the District of Columbia Inventory of Historic Sites in 2011 and the National Register of Historic Places in 2014. Development of the site that took place preceding the law school's move in 2016 preserved the existing character of outdoor spaces and incorporated historic structures, including Dunblane and the original 1905 A. O. Von Herbulis-designed seminary building, which has long stood prominently above passing traffic along Wisconsin Avenue.

== Geography ==
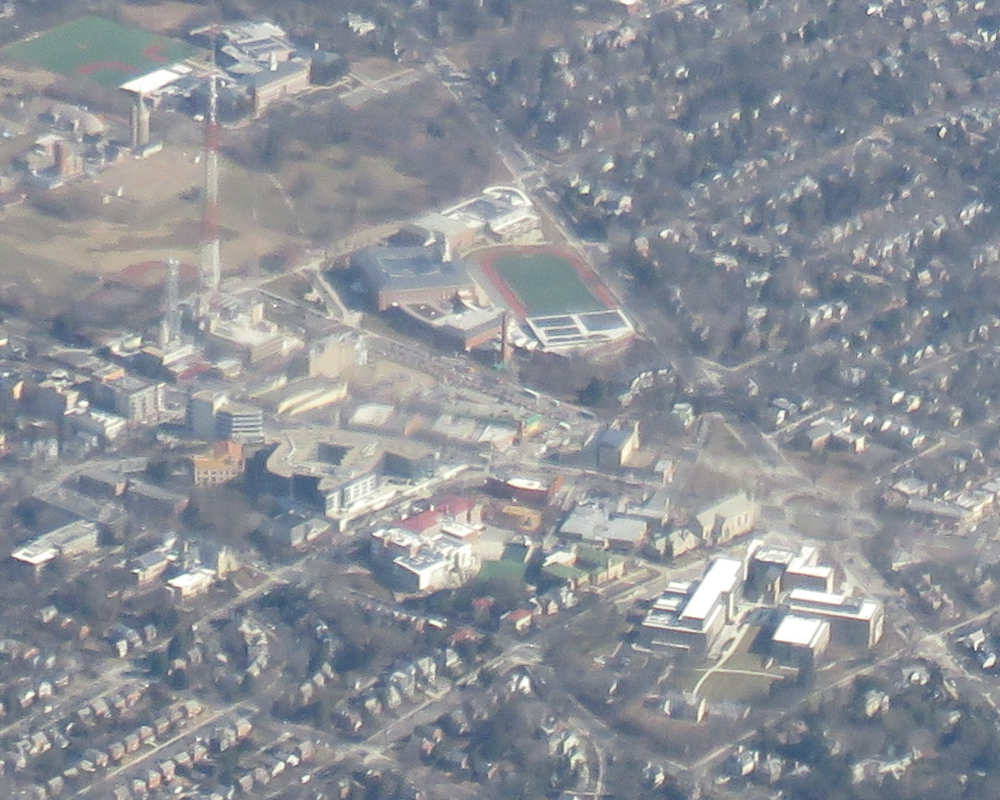
Aerial view of Tenleytown from the southwest, looking towards Fort Reno Park and Wakefield. Tenley Campus is at the bottom right.

Tenley Campus sits atop a knoll, fronting the western edge of Tenley Circle, at the intersection of Nebraska Avenue, Wisconsin Avenue, and Yuma Street NW in Northwest Washington, D.C.'s Tenleytown neighborhood. The eight-acre Tenley Campus is bounded by Yuma Street NW to the north; Warren Street NW to the south; Nebraska Avenue NW and Tenley Circle NW to the east; and 42nd Street NW to the west.

The block to the north is mostly institutional in character. It contains St. Ann Catholic Church and its rectory, the former Convent de Bon Secours, Janney Elementary School, and the Tenley-Friendship Neighborhood Library, as well as the historic N. Webster Chappell House. The rest of the surrounding area is residential; American University Park is to the west, consisting almost entirely of single-family detached homes. American University's main campus is about half a mile away, at the intersection of Nebraska and Massachusetts Avenues.

== History ==
=== Church use ===
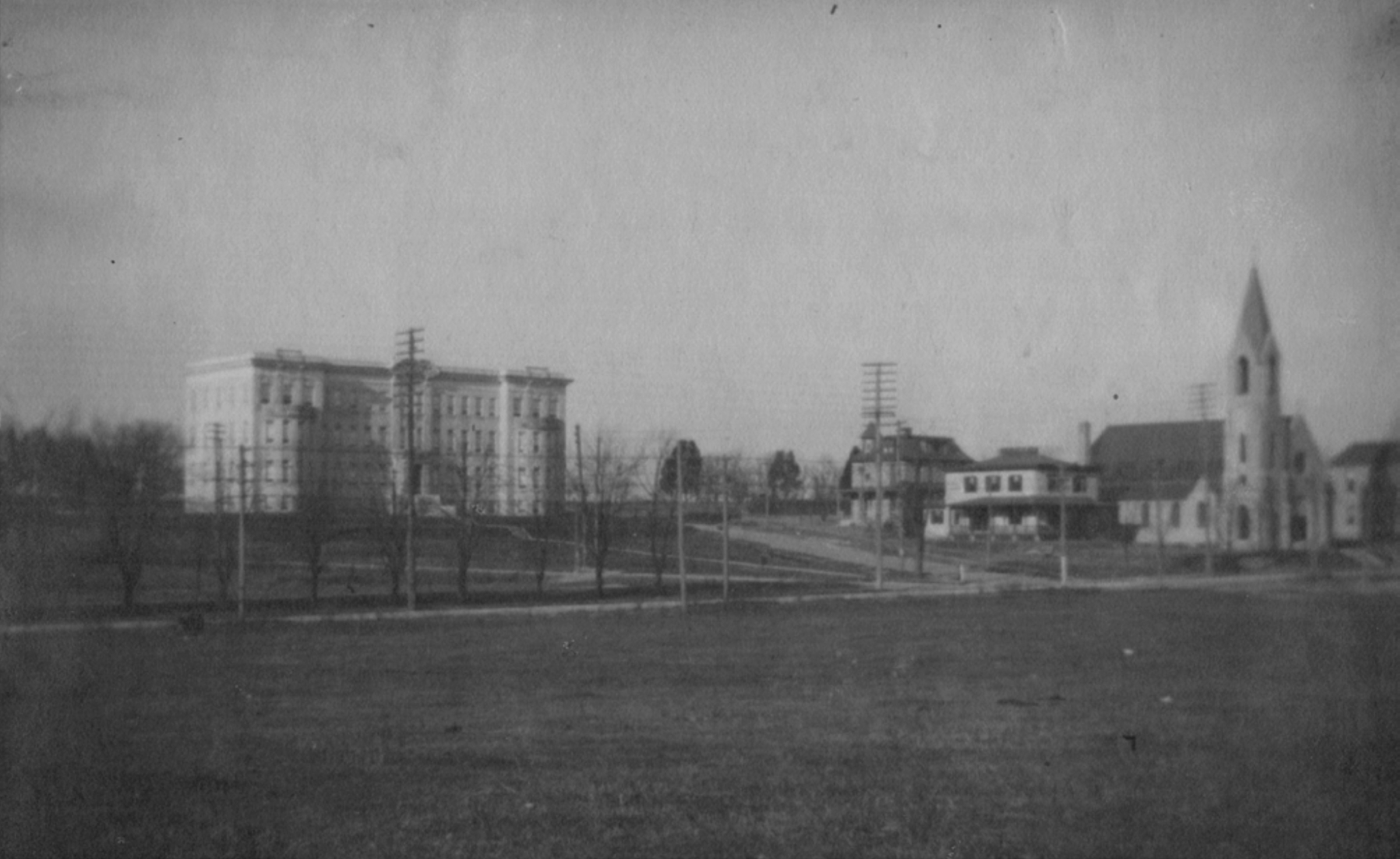
View of Immaculata Seminary (left), shortly after its completion, from across Wisconsin Avenue. The second St. Ann church building, built in 1903, and its rectory are to the right.

In 1902, with the support of Father Joseph C. Mallon, pastor of St. Ann Catholic Church in Tenleytown, the Sisters of Providence of Saint Mary-of-the-Woods, an order of religious sisters based in Indiana, announced plans to open a religious school in northwest Washington on land purchased from St. Ann's rectory. Two years later, another plot of land, this one across the street, was bought to spare the rectory from demolition. The plans followed a request by Cardinal James Gibbons, Archbishop of Baltimore, for the establishment of a "select school for girls" in the District. A new building for this purpose was designed by architect Albert Olszewski Von Herbulis, and, on July 2, 1904, the cornerstone was placed atop what the Sisters dubbed "Mount Marian."

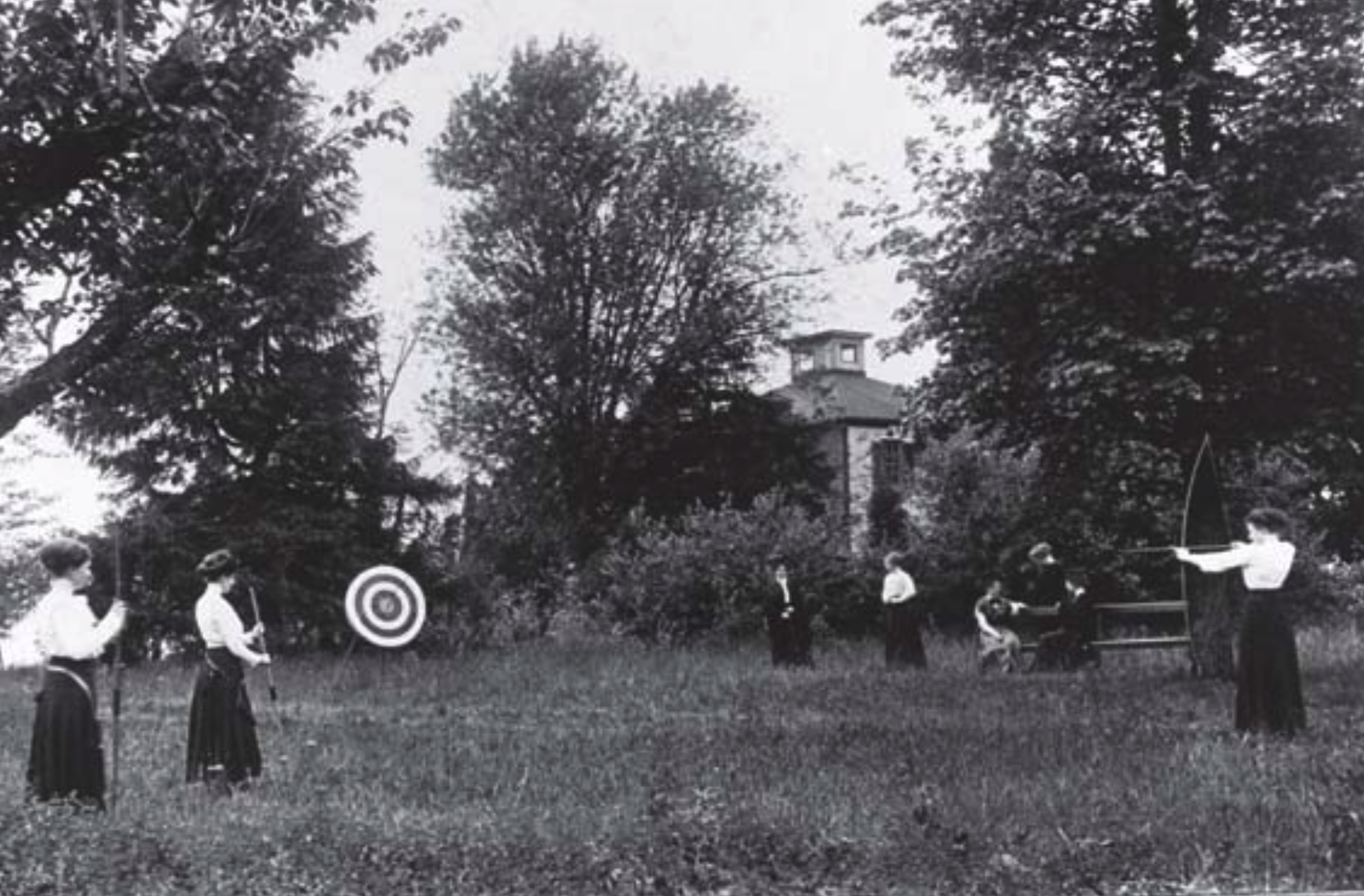
Immaculata students in front of Dunblane, practicing their archery skills, circa 1907

The Seminary of Our Lady Immaculate – or "Immaculata," for short – was completed the following year. It was so named in honor of the golden jubilee of Pope Pius IX's Ineffabilis Deus, which defined the dogma of the Immaculate Conception of the Virgin Mary. On September 8, the school hosted Cardinal Gibbons, who blessed the structure and then helped conduct a solemn high mass at St. Ann's; a sermon written for the occasion was given by F. X. McCarthy of Washington's St. Aloysius Church. Additional guests at the ceremonies included Bishop of Indianapolis Silas Chatard, President David H. Buel of Georgetown University, and other representatives of Catholic churches and organizations from around the region. Mother Superior Mary Cleophas Foley, also present, received a congratulatory letter from Cardinal Sebastiano Martinelli in Rome, passing along well-wishes on behalf of Pope Pius X. In 1906, the Sisters purchased the rear portion of the block, consolidating the land that would later comprise the U.S. historic district.

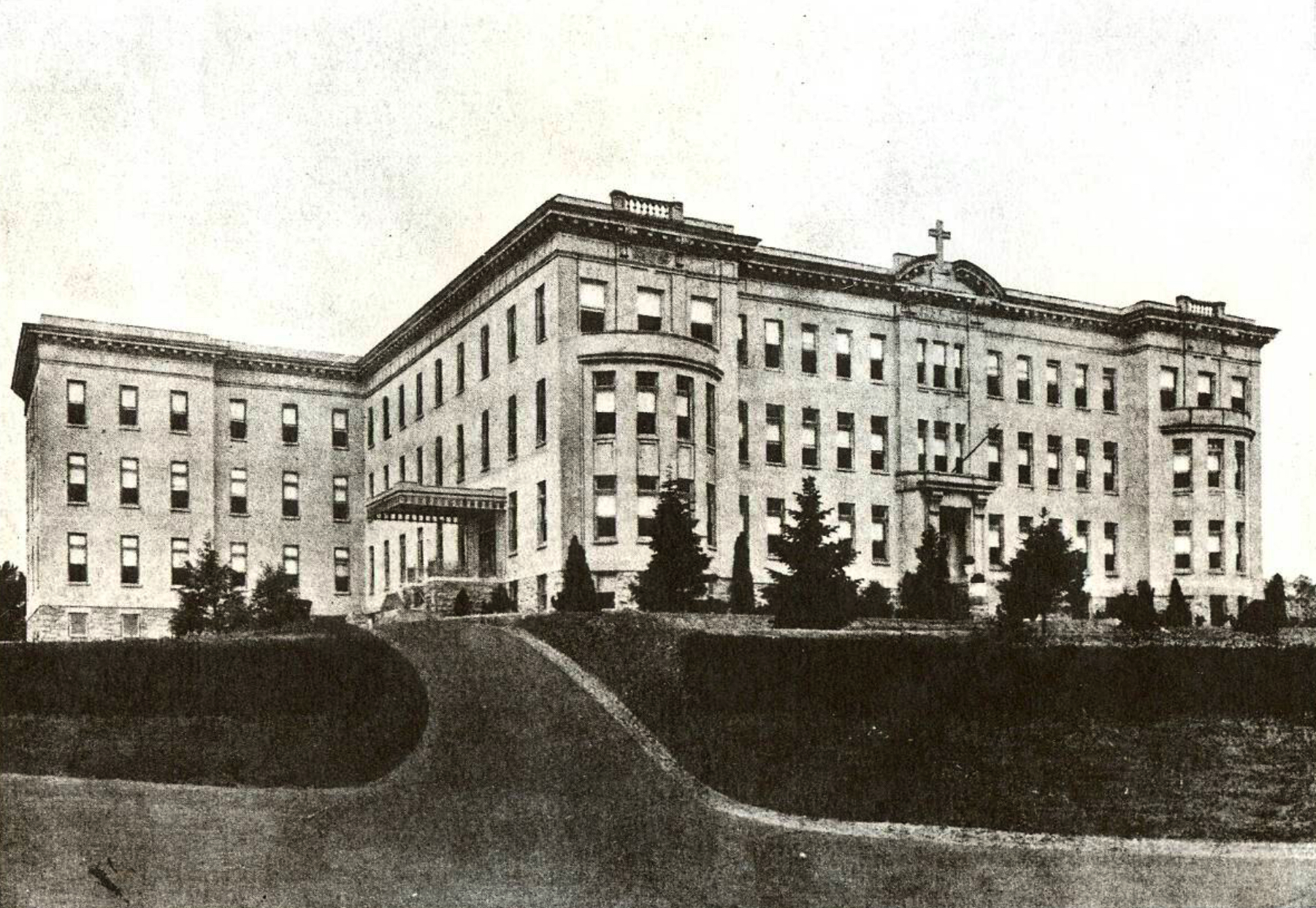
Immaculata Seminary, with 1921 dormitory addition visible, from Nebraska Avenue, circa 1929

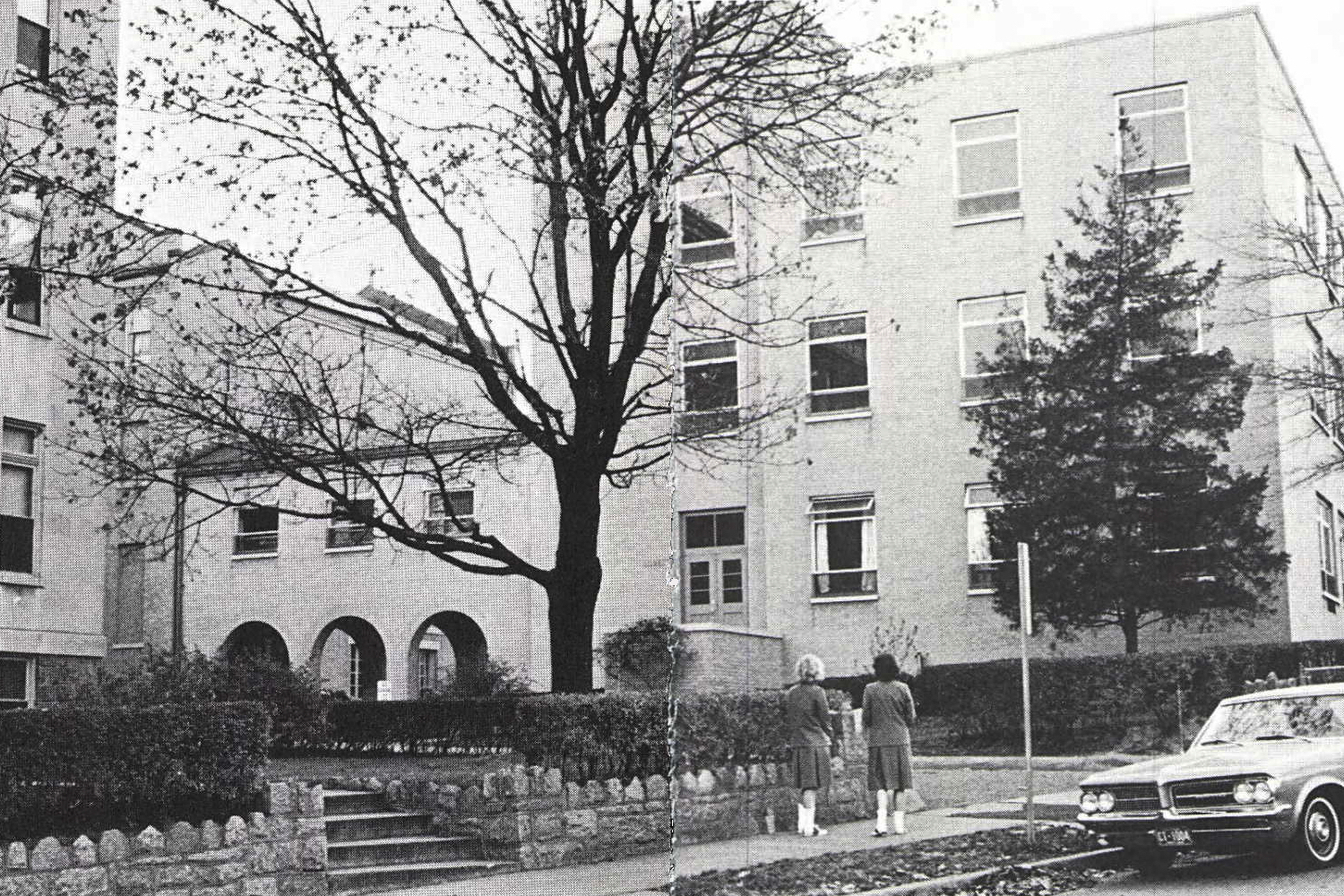
Two Immaculata students walking outside Loretta Hall on Yuma Street, circa 1965. Immaculata Hall and its chapel can be seen on the left.

On December 8, 1955, the day of the Feast of the Immaculate Conception, Amleto Cicognani, Apostolic Delegate to the United States laid the cornerstones for three new buildings at Immaculata: Marian, Loretta, and Regina Halls.

=== Acquisition by American University ===
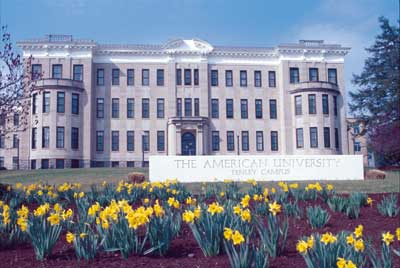
Capital Hall in 2006

In 1978, following the closure of Immaculata Junior College, American University began renting space in Marian Hall to address the need for additional student housing; shortly thereafter, they also started leasing Immaculata's gymnasium for evening use. AU officially took possession on December 4, 1986. After renovations were completed, the campus housed the university's Washington Semester and study abroad programs.

Purchased in 1987 by AU, Tenley Campus was acquired to alleviate space problems at the university's main campus. This campus was popular with interns because of its proximity to the Tenleytown-AU Metro station on the WMATA Red Line. It was formerly home to the School of Professional & Extended Studies, including the Washington Semester Program, as well as University Publications, the Media Relations department, and the Osher Lifelong Learning Institute.

- Federal Hall—Housed 128 students; Contained the mailroom, computer lab, and dining hall (Tenley Café).
- Congressional Hall—Housed 173 students; contained reception desk and Resident Director's office.
- Constitution Building—Contained the Washington Semester Program, University Publications, Alumni Relations, and other administrative offices.

These offices and the buildings that housed them were largely demolished in 2013 to make way for a new home for the Washington College of Law. In 2016 the school completed a slew of new academic buildings designed by the architectural firm SmithGroupJJR, and the Washington College of Law formally relocated to Tenley Campus.

The new law school was formally dedicated on February 12, 2016. In attendance were Mayor of the District of Columbia Muriel Bowser and Associate Justice of the Supreme Court of the United States Ruth Bader Ginsburg, who gave the keynote address at the event.

== Significant contributing properties ==
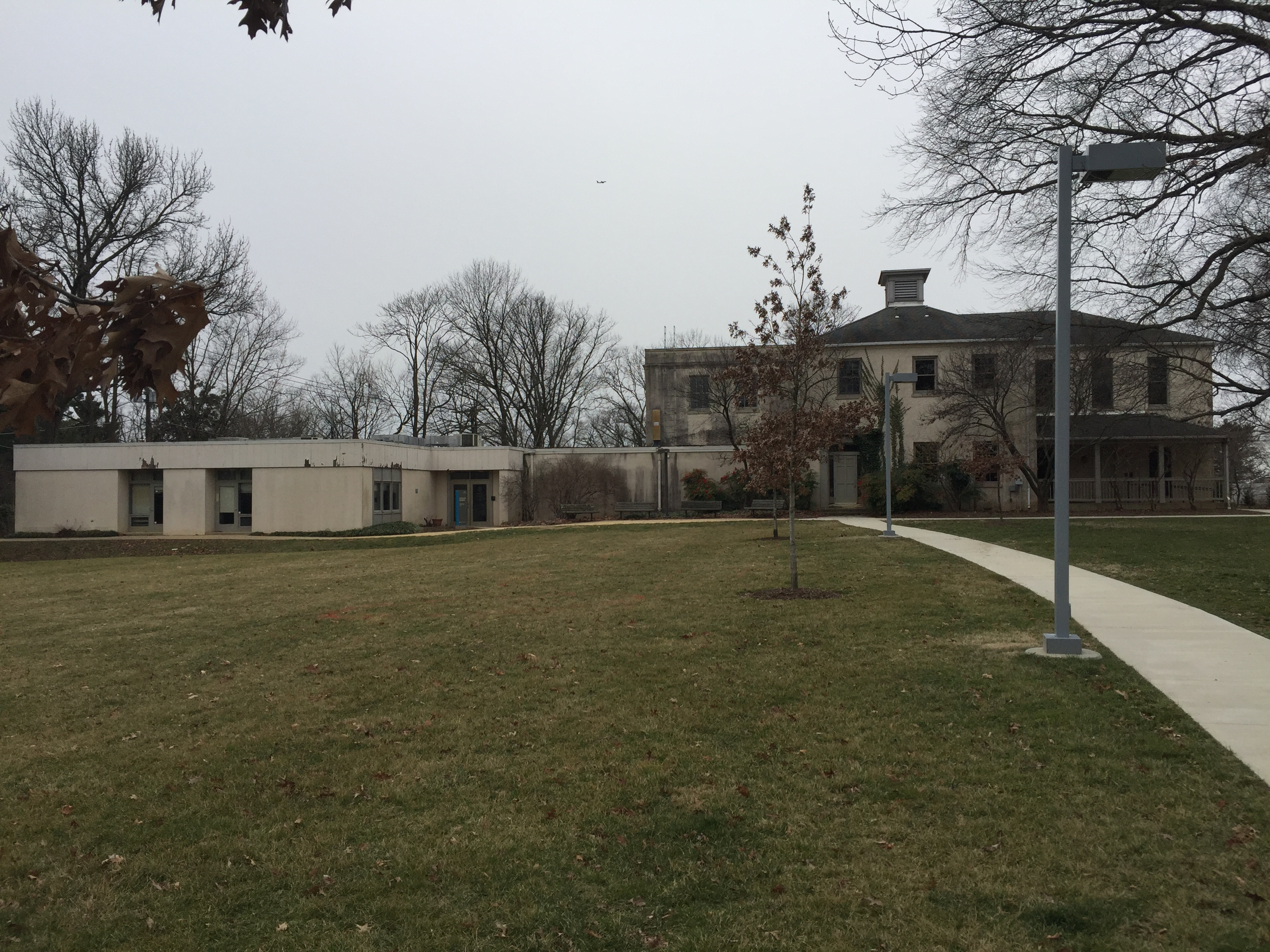
Dunblane, with its 1935 and 1974 additions visible at left

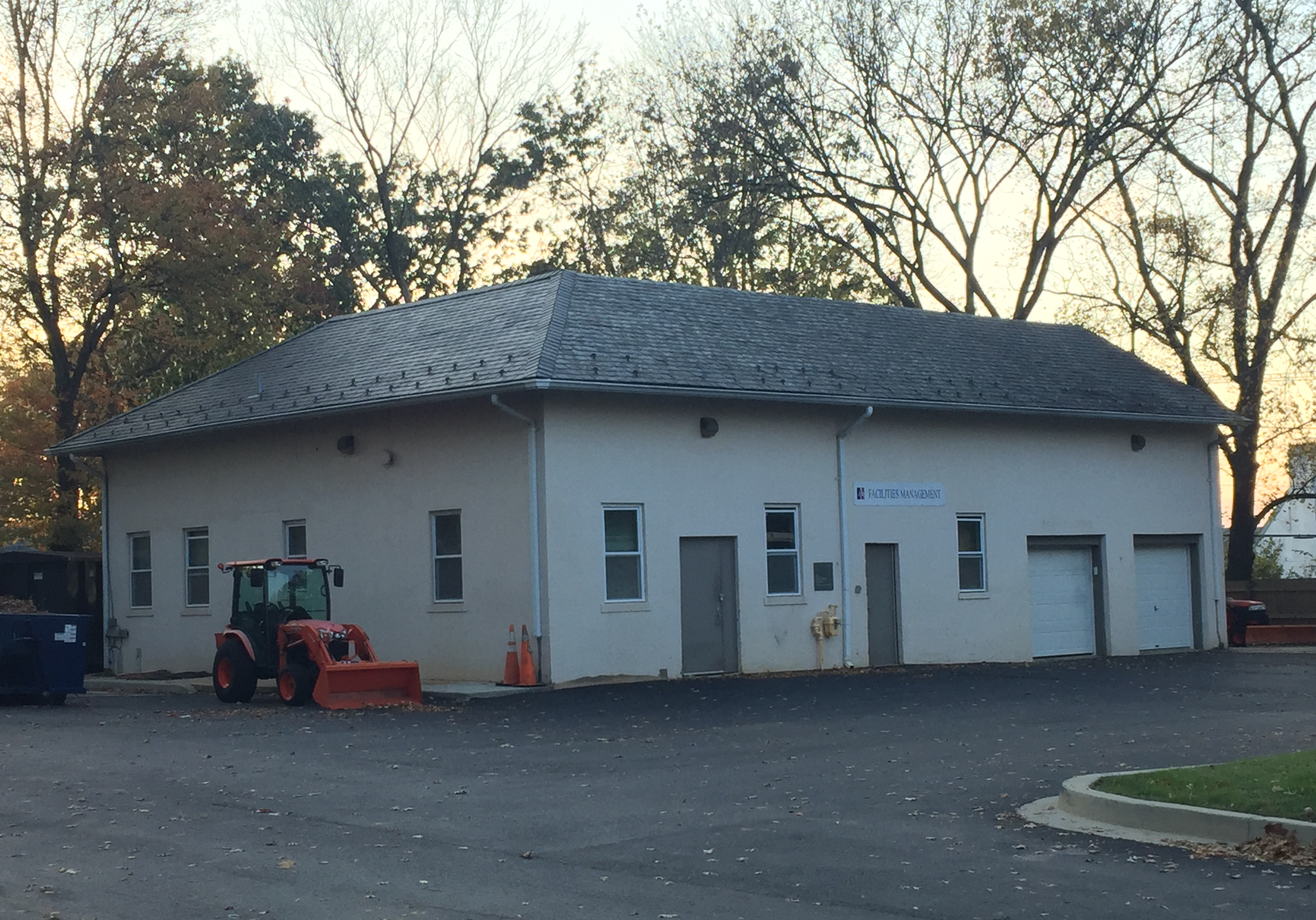
1921 garage and laundry building, currently used by American University facilities management

== Present use ==
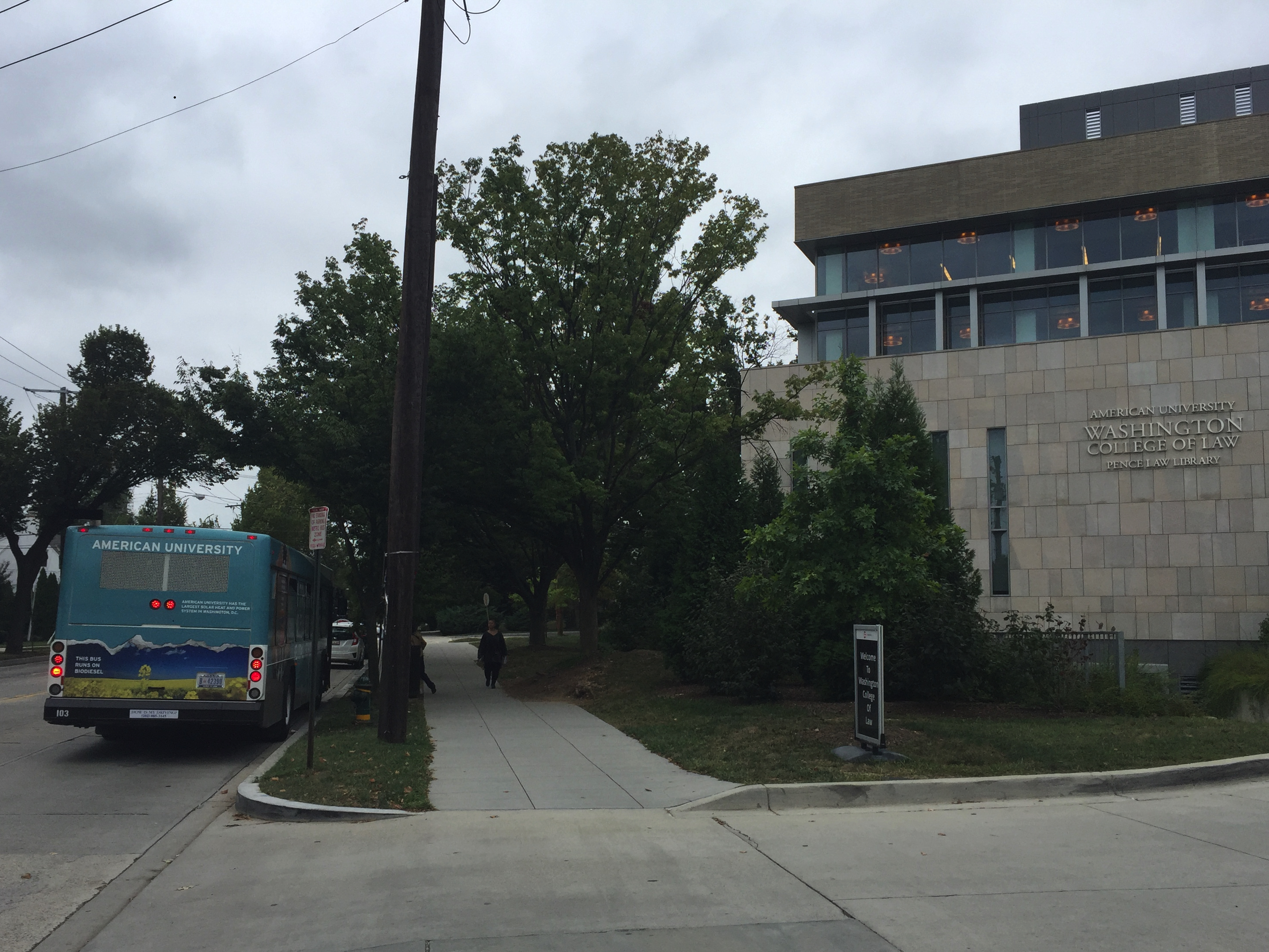
An American University shuttle on its way down Nebraska Avenue stops in front of WCL's Warren Building, home to the Pence Law Library.

New and Renovated Buildings (c. 2016):

- Capital Hall-Older but newly renovated former cathedral. Houses law school admissions and administrative services.
- Warren Building-Completely new academic building. Features various classrooms, offices, and the Pence Law Library.
- Yuma Building-Another completely new academic building. Houses many classrooms, faculty offices, and other academic and administrative spaces.

Tenley Campus's buildings are Gold-certified by Leadership in Energy and Environmental Design (LEED).

== See also ==
- National Register of Historic Places listings in western Washington, D.C.
- Dumblane, an NRHP-listed home built in 1911, across Warren Street from the Immaculata campus
