= Grant Road Historic District =

Historic district in Washington, D.C., United States

- U.S. National Register of Historic Places
- U.S. Historic district
- D.C. Inventory of Historic Sites
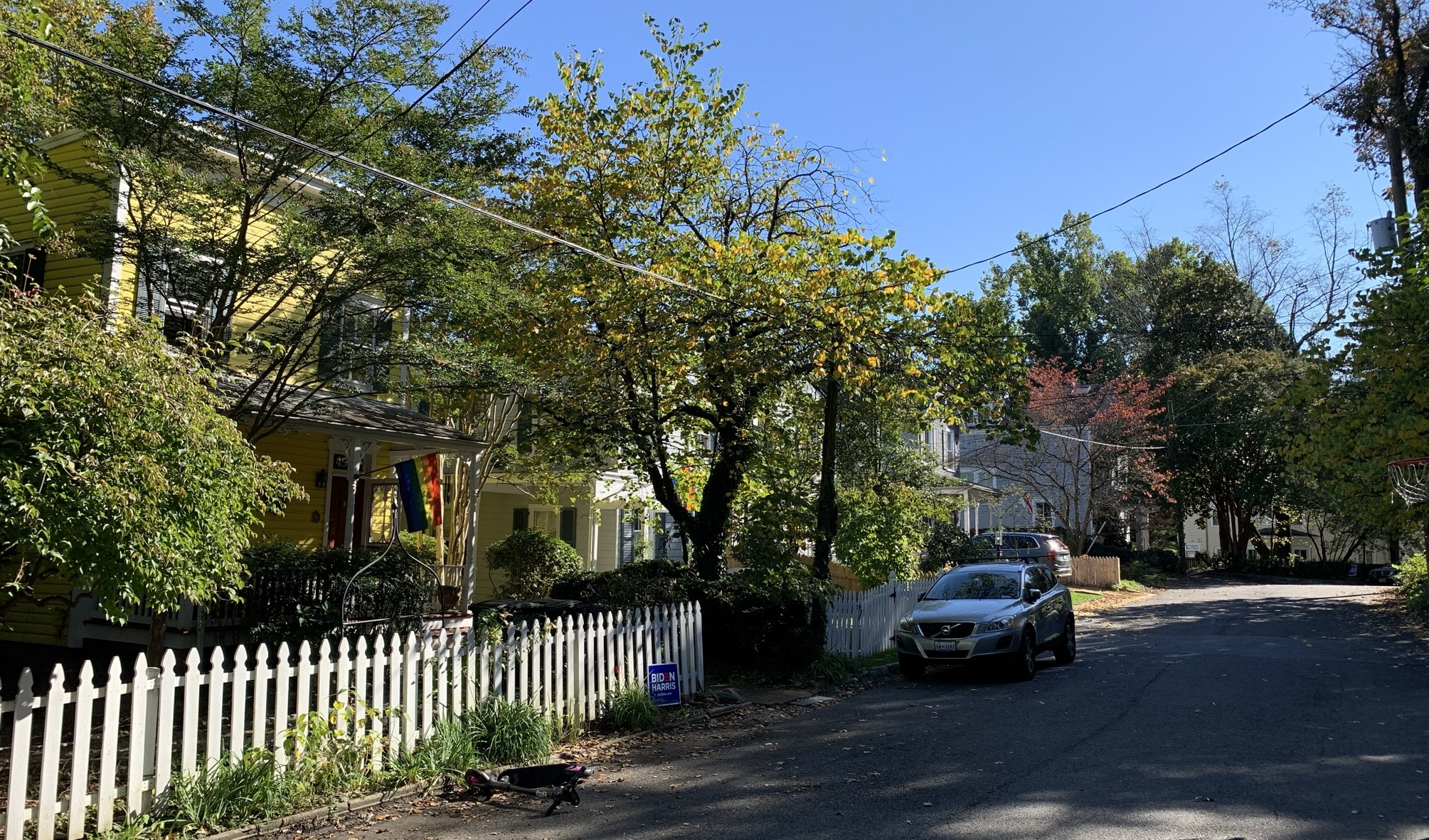
- Facing west on the 4500 block of Grant Road NW. The narrow street maintains a rural character which is unusual in Washington, D.C.

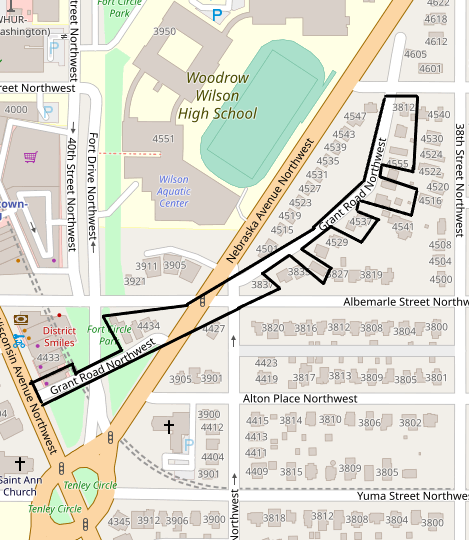
- Location: 4400 and 4500 blocks of Grant Road NW, Washington, D.C.
- Coordinates: 38°56′55.6″N 77°04′32.7″W
- NRHP reference No.: 04000116

Significant dates
- Added to NRHP: March 3, 2004
- Designated DCIHS: April 21, 2002

The Grant Road Historic District is located in the Tenleytown neighborhood of Washington, D.C. The two-block historic district is what remains of a former settlement in rural Washington County in the District of Columbia. It includes 13 contributing buildings and the road itself, a narrow remnant of a country road that was used by soldiers in the Civil War⁣⁣. Following the war, the road was named after Civil War general and president Ulysses S. Grant. Grant Road developed into a residential street lined with mostly small, two-story homes for working-class people.

As the surrounding area developed, Grant Road retained its rural character. Segments of the road were separated for large-scale development of middle-class homes. Many of the homes that once lined Grant Road were demolished in the process. After a large, prominent house on the corner of Grant Road and Albemarle Street was demolished in 1999, residents sought historic landmark status for their properties. The historic district was added to the District of Columbia Inventory of Historic Sites in 2002 and listed on the National Register of Historic Places in 2004. The buildings date from the 1860s to the 1900s. Residential styles employed include the I-house, Italianate boxes, and side- and front-gabled folk house forms. A former post office and general store are also located on Wisconsin Avenue.

== Geography ==
The Grant Road Historic District is located on the 4400 and 4500 blocks of Grant Road NW in the Tenleytown neighborhood of Washington, D.C. The 4400 block begins north of Tenley Circle at the intersection with Wisconsin Avenue, then crosses Fort Drive. Nebraska Avenue divides the two blocks. The 4500 block begins at the junction of 39th Street, Albemarle Street, and Grant Street, then proceeds northeast to the intersection with Brandywine Street. The historic district ends at this intersection, but this portion of Grant Road extends for another half block. Nebraska Avenue separates Grant Street from a one-block portion further northeast between Cumberland and Davenport Streets. There are two additional stretches of Grant Road further east: two blocks between 30th and 32nd Streets and an unnumbered portion between Broad Branch Road and Ridge Road that passes through Rock Creek Park.

The historic district includes the road itself and 13 contributing buildings, one of which is a commercial building on Wisconsin Avenue. The remaining buildings are single-family homes on Grant Road: homes on the north side of the 4400 block and south side of the 4500 block. There are several non-contributing houses on the 4500 block that were built in the mid-20th century. The 4500 block of Grant Road is narrow at only 33 feet (10 m) wide, which is around half the standard width of streets in the city, and does not have a sidewalk or street furniture. The buildings on the 4400 block include the commercial building fronting Wisconsin Avenue and three homes on a small ridge.

== History ==
=== 18th and 19th centuries ===
Around 1795, blacksmith John Tennally opened a small tavern at the intersection of present-day Wisconsin Avenue and River Road, which were former Native American footpaths. Around a dozen families soon moved to the area, forming a village called Tennallytown, the second oldest settlement in present-day Washington, D.C. The village became a stagecoach stop for people traveling between Georgetown and Maryland. In the 1791 plan for the new federal City of Washington, the village was included in the city's boundary. Due to its distance from the city center, Tenallytown would remain a small rural village in Washington County for many years. The village's name gradually changed to the present spelling, Tenleytown.

In 1805 present-day Wisconsin Avenue became a toll road and was later macadamized in the late 1810s and early 1820s. The village continued to grow in the 1800s, with a church, school, houses, and other businesses built near the tavern. By the 1850s the stagecoach service had ended due to the Baltimore and Ohio Railroad and the village was connected to rural communities to its east by a country lane that was called New Cut Road or Road from Turnpike to Broad Branch.

During the Civil War farmland in the surrounding area was seized by the federal government after the Union Army was defeated at the First Battle of Bull Run. The government built Fort Reno, one of 68 fortifications built to defend the city, on the city's highest natural point of 409 feet (125 m). New Cut Road was just south of Fort Reno and was used by soldiers to traverse between other forts. During the war Thomas Paxton reportedly constructed three houses on the present-day 4400 block of Grant Road. It is believed to be the same houses that stand there today. One of these homes, 4434 Grant Road NW, also known as the Tenant House, was possibly built as a tenant house for The Rest, an early 18th-century house at 39th Street and Windom Place, which is the neighborhood's oldest residence.

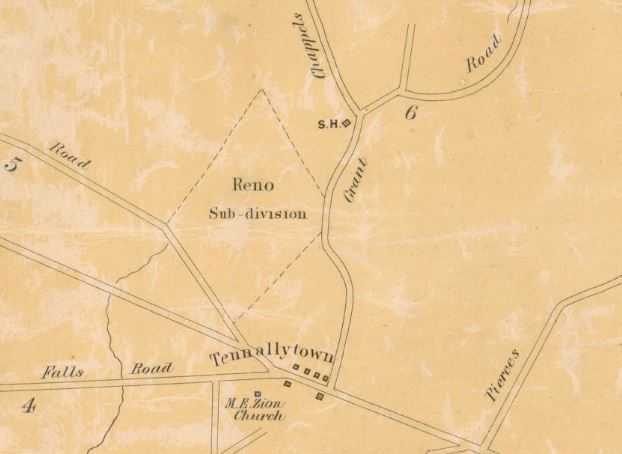
An 1870 map of Grant Road and Tennallytown.

Two schools were also built during the war. A school for white children stood on a hill overlooking the road and a school for black children was farther east, near the road's intersection with present-day Broad Branch Road. After the war, New Cut Road was renamed in honor of General Ulysses S. Grant. Due to development that resulted from Fort Reno, the area's population increased, and Grant Road became a residential street and an important part of the village's growth.

The last quarter of the 19th century saw gradual development on Grant Road and the surrounding farmland area. The land where Fort Reno stood became a predominantly Black neighborhood called Reno City. German, Irish, and Italian immigrants moved to Tenleytown, building their houses and opening a variety of shops. The area became a working-class village, with two-story frame houses lining streets on the east side of Wisconsin Avenue. Most of the buildings in the historic district date from this period. The commercial building at 4425 Wisconsin Avenue NW, the oldest surviving commercial building in the neighborhood, was constructed in 1887 by John J. O'Day. It originally served as the O'Day General Store and Tenleytown Post Office. The house at 3837 Albemarle Street NW was reportedly built near the Old Naval Observatory in the mid-19th century but relocated in the 1890s. Six surviving homes along the 4500 block of Grant Road were built between 1890 and 1894.

During the 1890s a streetcar line was installed along Wisconsin Avenue, linking the village with Georgetown and resulting in further development. The population of Tenleytown increased from 731 to 1,127 between 1892 and 1897, and large amounts of homes and shops were built along Wisconsin Avenue and the surrounding streets. In 1894, there were over 30 buildings on the 4400 and 4500 blocks of Grant Road. The road played such an important role in local development that a 1899 article in the Evening Star said that if Tenleytown was a hand, Grant Road was its thumb "with twisting and turning knuckles, grabbed onto by more than its shares of houses."

=== 20th and 21st centuries ===
By 1900 there were six churches, several schools, and a firehouse in Tenleytown, along with a variety of specialty businesses, including a restaurant, grocery shops, pharmacy, butcher shop, and dry goods store. President Theodore Roosevelt would ride his horse through the area as he made his way from the White House to his nearby hunting lodge. He reportedly stopped at the house at 4426 Grant Road NW on at least two occasions to take the children for a horseback ride. The two 20th-century houses in the historic district, 4547 and 4555 Grant Road NW, were built during this period in 1908.

During the 1910s real estate developers purchased large amounts of land in the area to build middle-class homes for white residents. These projects didn't succeed until after World War I, when developers Harry Kite and Samuel Kite Jr. led development east of Wisconsin Avenue, inspired by the success of nearby upper-middle-class subdivisions such as Chevy Chase, Cleveland Park, and Friendship Heights. These developments changed the demographics of Tenleytown from a working-class village to a middle-class neighborhood, and Reno City was demolished beginning in 1928. The developments also led to new roads being cut through the area. Wisconsin Avenue was widened in 1919 to accommodate streetcars and automobiles, and Albemarle Street was extended from Reno Road to Wisconsin Avenue. When Albemarle Street was extended in 1931, three houses on Grant Road were demolished and two were moved, including 3837 Albemarle Street NW. The houses on the 4400 block of Grant Road also lost their rear yards when Albemarle Street was extended.

In addition to the Albemarle Street extension, there were significant changes to Grant Road during the 1930s. Tenley Circle was paved in 1936, becoming a busy intersection for buses and streetcars, 39th Street was extended to Albemarle Street, and the diagonal Nebraska Avenue was created to link Tenleytown with Connecticut Avenue. Several houses were demolished in the process, and in 1937 C. Harold Gray wrote, "Tenleytown was the nucleus of an extensive country road net which has since largely disappeared...In extending Washington's straight streets through the community, many of the buildings were removed and its appearance changed almost beyond recognition."

There were also large developments that changed the character of the neighborhood. Woodrow Senior High and Deal Junior High were built, a reservoir and water tower were built on the Fort Reno site, and the National Capital Planning Commission planned a scenic drive that would connect Civil War-era forts. To build this scenic road, named Fort Reno Drive, several houses on Grant Road were demolished. The plan was approved by the neighborhood's new middle-class residents, who thought the older buildings were unattractive and hurt the value of their own properties, but the project was later cancelled.

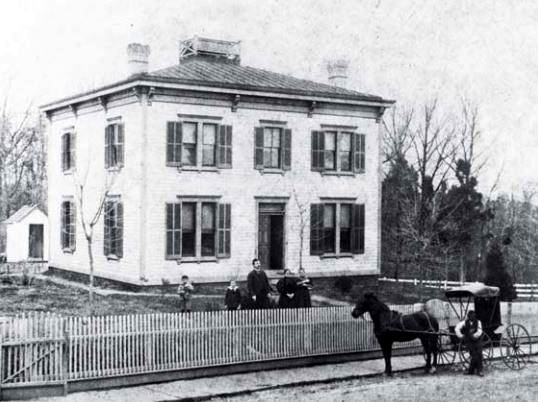
Chappell House, demolished in 1999

After Nebraska Avenue was completed, homes were built along the road in the 1940s. The rear of these homes faces the north side of the 4500 block of Grant Road. In the 1950s and 1960s, some of the lots on the south side of the 4500 block of Grant Road were divided to accommodate construction of new homes. These mid- to late 20th-century homes on each side of the block are considered noncontributing to the historic district, but due to the deep lots of the Nebraska Avenue properties, Grant Road kept the appearance of a rural country road.

After Metro's Tenleytown station opened in the 1980s, there was significant development in the neighborhood. In the 1990s, there were calls for higher-density housing to be built close to the Metro station. This was welcomed by locals, but they wanted this new housing to be built along major roads like Wisconsin Avenue. In 1999 the large house on the northwest corner of Albemarle Street and Grant Road was demolished and replaced with condominiums. The house had been built in 1890 for Dr. John W. Chappell and included a large garden. It was considered one of the nicest buildings on Grant Road, and its demolition was protested by area residents.

The people who lived in the remaining houses on Grant Road took notice and sought to protect their properties from demolition. Following a historic landmark designation process, the 4400 and 4500 blocks of Grant Road and its 13 remaining historic buildings were added to the District of Columbia Inventory of Historic Sites on April 21, 2002, and listed on the National Register of Historic Places on March 3, 2004. The Grant Road Historic District was the first historic district in the city to include just a single street. In 2017, a mural depicting some of Tenleytown's history and landmarks was painted on the side of 4425 Wisconsin Avenue NW.

== Architecture ==
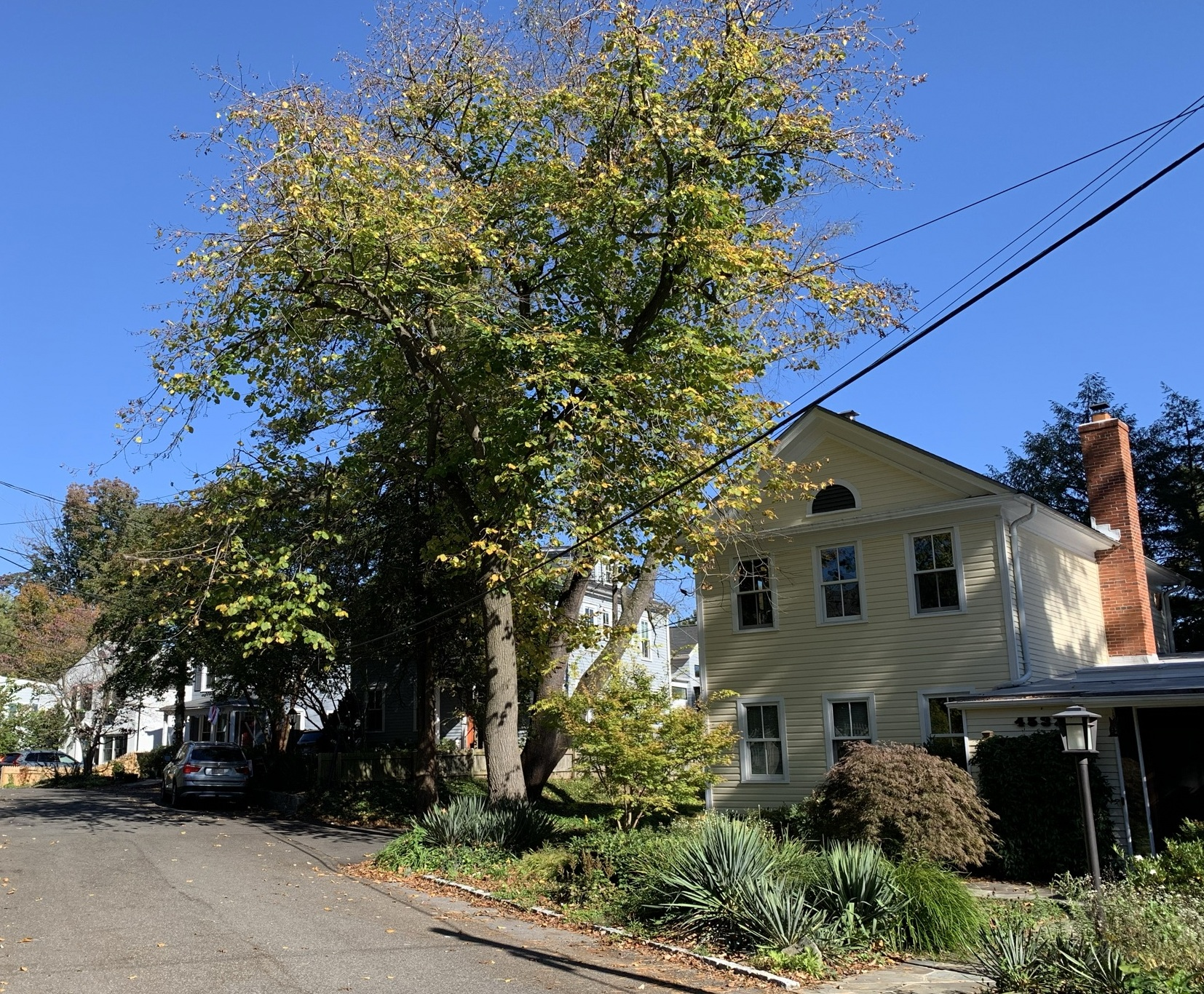
Facing east down the 4500 block of Grant Road NW. The house in the foreground is 4537 Grant Road NW.

The two-story stucco and stone commercial building at 4425 Wisconsin Avenue NW is one of several buildings in the historic district designed in the Italianate style. The building is two stories and three bays wide with a sloped roof. It originally included a projecting storefront, but that was later replaced with the current show window. The building's main entrance is on Wisconsin Avenue, but the side door facing Grant Road originally served as a second entrance.

The Italianate two-story house at 4426 Grant Road NW, also listed as 3926 Albemarle Street NW, is historically known as the Burrows House. This is one of three houses reportedly built by Thomas Paxton in the 1860s, and all are set slightly higher than street level. The building is three bays wide and features a gabled roof. The stone chimney, stone retaining wall, and stone columns supporting the one-story porch were reportedly quarried from local stones by W. Tyson Burrow in the 1880s. There is a one-story garage facing Albemarle Street. The house at 4430 Grant Road NW was designed in the vernacular Italianate style and is historically known as the Parks-Conner House. It is a two-story frame building with two bays and a bracketed cornice. The one-story wrap-around porch includes decorative elements. The vernacular Tenant House at 4434 Grant Road NW is believed to be the oldest of the three houses. Stucco covers the two-story, three-bay-wide frame building. There is a central chimney, gabled roof, and one-story porch. The original decorative porch included gingerbread detailing.

The first house on the next block is 3837 Albemarle Street NW, historically known as the Christian-Curran House. It is sited at the intersection of 39th Street, Albemarle Street, and Grant Road. The L-shaped building was designed in the vernacular Italianate style and is two bays wide with a hipped roof and one-story wrap-around porch. The Italianate house at 3831 Albemarle Street NW is historically known as the Poore House. The frame building is three bays wide and features a one-story porch.

The Hesterberg House at 4537 Grant Road NW was designed in the vernacular Greek Revival style. The rectangular building is two-and-a-half stories, three bays wide, and four bays deep and is connected to a one-story addition. The house at 4543 Grant Road NW is historically known as the Admiral's House. The house was originally two-story, L-shaped, and two bays wide but was renovated into a 2 1/2-story, four-bay-wide Colonial Revival building with a small porch. The Folk Victorian house at 4547 Grant Road NW is historically known as the Cottage. The house is a two-story frame building, two bays wide, and its original one-story porch includes decorative elements. The Voight House at 4555 Grant Road NW was designed in the Italianate style. It is two stories, two bays wide, with a one-story side porch.

The house at 4561 Grant Road NW, also known as the Payne House, is another two-story, two-bay-wide Italianate house. It includes the original porch with decorative elements. The vernacular I-house at 4565 Grant Road NW is two stories and three bays wide with a small porch. The last house in the historic district, 3812 Brandywine Street NW, is also two-stories and three bays wide. It was designed in the Italianate style and includes a small porch.

== Table of contributing buildings ==
Rating	Image	Address	Year	Style	Comments
Contributing		4425 Wisconsin Avenue NW; 38°56′50.1″N 77°04′44.3″W	1887	Italianate	Tenleytown's oldest surviving commercial building.
Contributing		4426 Grant Road NW; 38°56′51.5″N 77°04′41.5″W	1860s	Italianate	Also listed as 3926 Albemarle Street NW and known as the Burrows House. Features stonework that was locally quarried by W. Tyson Burrow.
Contributing		4430 Grant Road NW; 38°56′51.6″N 77°04′44.1″W	1860s	Italianate	Also known as the Parks-Conner House.
Contributing		4434 Grant Road NW; 38°56′51.8″N 77°04′40.6″W	1860s	Vernacular	Also known as the Tenant House. Believed to be the oldest of the three houses on this block.
Contributing		3837 Albemarle Street NW; 38°56′53″N 77°04′36.2″W	Mid-19th century	Italianate	Also known as the Christian-Curran House.
Contributing		3831 Albemarle Street NW; 38°56′53.5″N 77°04′34.1″W	1894	Italianate	Also listed as 4521 Grant Road NW and known as the Poore House.
Contributing		4537 Grant Road NW; 38°56′54.9″N 77°04′32.7″W	1890	Greek Revival	Also known as the Hesterberg House.
Contributing		4543 Grant Road NW; 38°56′55.5″N 77°04′31.6″W	1890	Colonial Revival	Also known as the Admiral's House.
Contributing		4547 Grant Road NW; 38°56′55.9″N 77°04′31.4″W	1908	Folk Victorian	Also known as the Cottage.
Contributing		4555 Grant Road NW; 38°56′56.6″N 77°04′31.2″W	1908	Italianate	Also known as the Voight House.
Contributing		4561 Grant Road NW; 38°56′57″N 77°04′31.2″W	1890	Italianate	Also known as the Payne House.
Contributing		4565 Grant Road NW; 38°56′57.6″N 77°04′30.9″W	1892	I-house	
Contributing		3812 Brandywine Street NW; 38°56′58.2″N 77°04′32″W	1890	Italianate	

== See also ==
- National Register of Historic Places listings in Washington, D.C.
