= Albert Olszewski Von Herbulis =

American architect

Adalbert Olszewski Von Herbulis
- Born: April 23, 1861; Budapest, Hungary
- Died: April 14, 1928 (aged 66)
- Occupation: Architect

Adalbert Olszewski "Albert" Von Herbulis (April 23, 1861 – April 14, 1928) was an architect who practiced in Washington, D.C., who is best known for having designed the Cathedral of St. Helena in Helena, Montana.

== Early life and education ==
Born Adalbert Olszewski in Budapest, Hungary, he changed his surname to Von Herbulis and kept Olszewski as his middle name. He graduated from the Military Academy of Vienna and the Polytechnic University of Vienna, after which he migrated to the United States. Von Herbulis immigrated to the United States sometime around 1880. He married Amalie Anne Wittke on November 26, 1884, in Scranton, Pennsylvania.

== Career in America ==
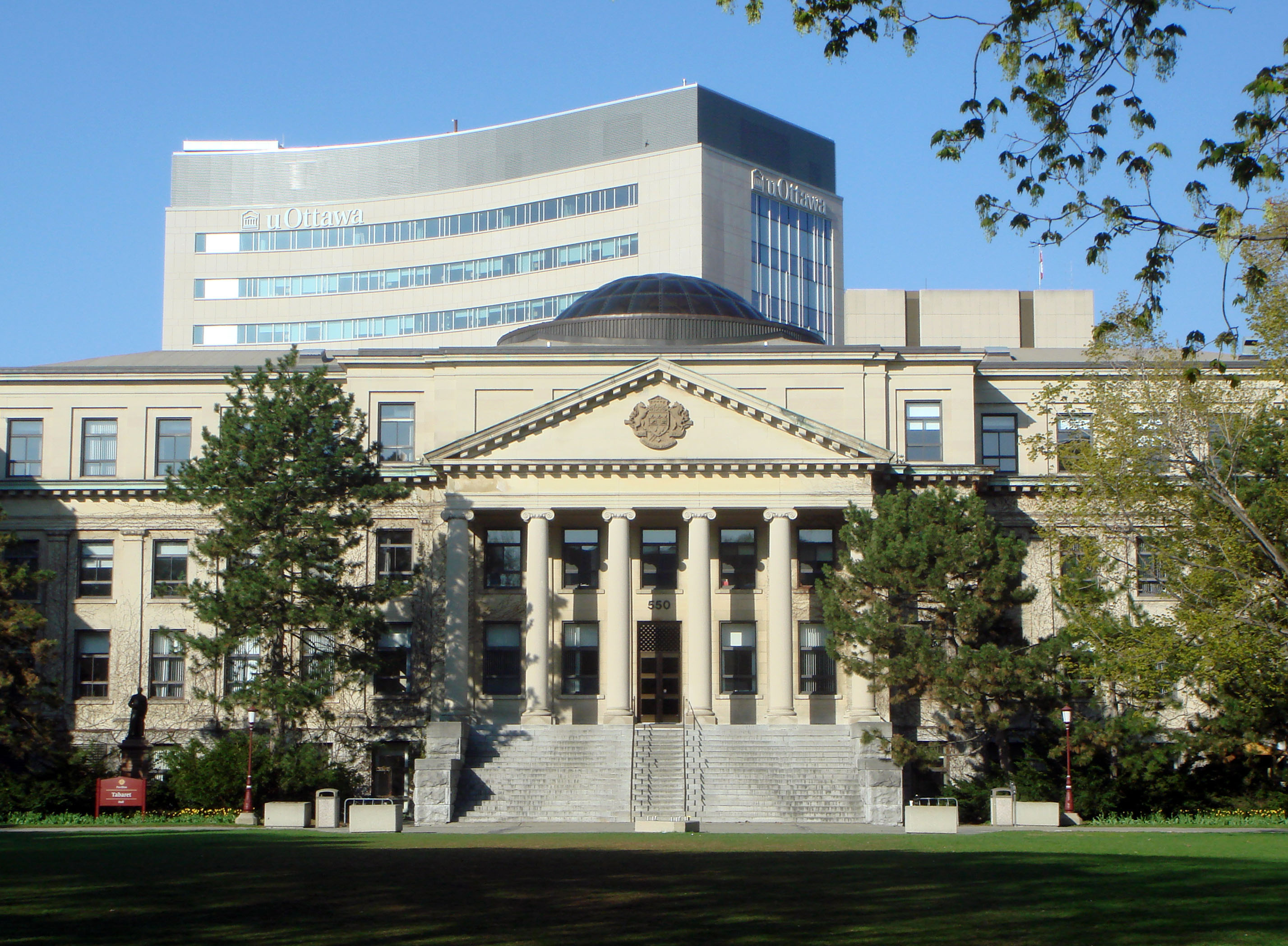
Arts and Science Building, University of Ottawa.

He practiced architecture for a short time in Scranton, Pennsylvania, after which he moved to Washington, D.C. The Roman Catholic Church, his principal client, engaged him to design numerous ecclesiastical and educational buildings. In 1904, the Catholic Diocese of Ottawa commissioned him to design a new campus plan, a scheme that included eight new buildings, of which only the Arts and Sciences Building was built. Among other works, Von Herbulis designed the Roman Catholic Cathedral at Helena, Montana; the Holy Angels Roman Catholic Academy & School, Buffalo, N.Y.; and Ryan Hall at Georgetown University.

In 1913, while supervising completion of the Blessed Sacrament Academy in Birmingham, Alabama, he opened an office in the Woodward Building and solicited other commissions in the region. His design for a 9-story "Hygeia Building" for medical offices in downtown Birmingham was unrealized, as was much of his Gothic-revival master plan for St. Bernard College in Cullman, Alabama. The Sacred Heart Hospital in Pensacola, Florida was his next large commission, which he clad in Alabama freestone quarried in Cullman County.

Von Herbulis suffered a heart attack on the Washington-Virginia Railway on 14 April 1928, and died on the spot. He was buried at St. James Catholic Church in Falls Church, Virginia.

== Architectural works ==
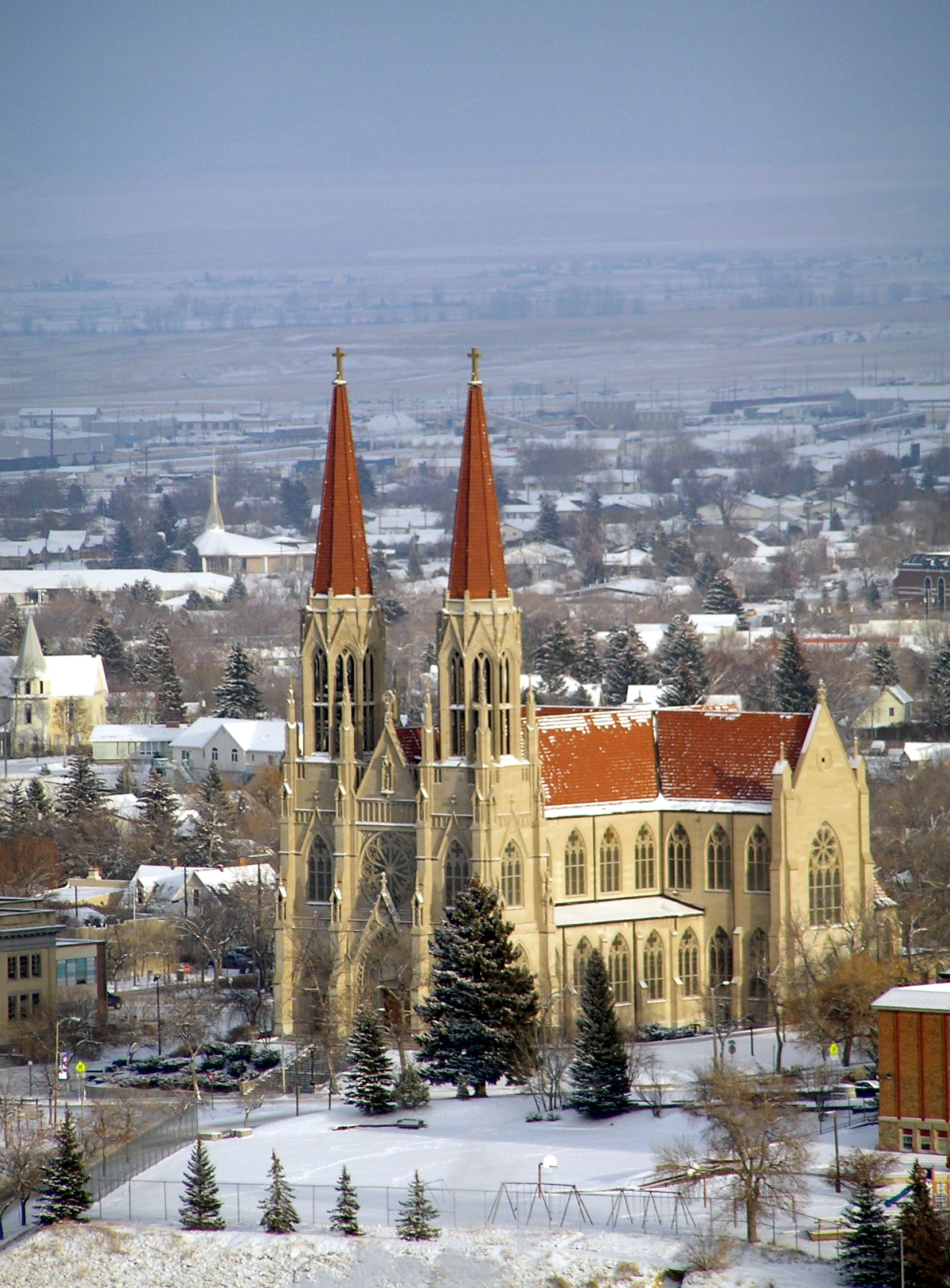
The Cathedral of St. Helena, Helena, Montana.

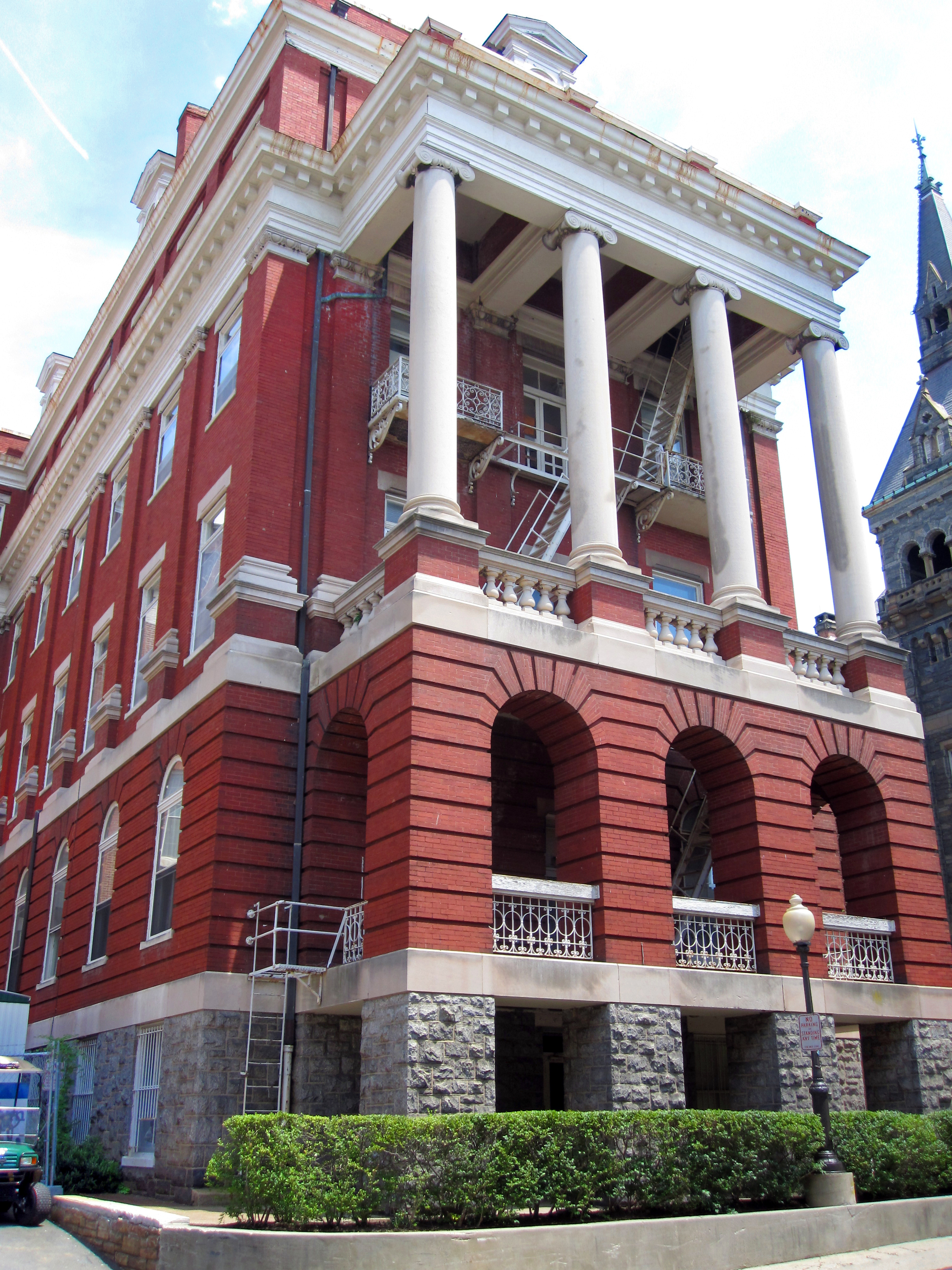
Ryan Hall at Georgetown University.

- Holy Cross College (now O'Boyle Hall), the Catholic University of America, Washington D.C. (completed 1899).
- Ryan Hall, Georgetown University, Washington, D.C. (completed 1903).
- Marist College, Savannah and Second Streets, Washington D.C. (built 1903–1904).
- Columbia Schoolhouse, Columbia Pike, Columbia Heights, Virginia (dedicated 1904).
- St. Mark's Lutheran Church, 8th and B Streets, SE, Washington, D.C. (cornerstone laid 1904).
- College of the Immaculate Conception (now Dominican House of Studies), 487 Michigan Avenue NE, Washington, D.C. (designed 1903; dedicated 1905).
- Arts and Science Building, University of Ottawa, Ottawa, Ontario (1904–1905).
- St. Peter's R.C. Church, Barclay Street, New York (restoration 1904–1905).
- Immaculata Seminary, American University Tenley Campus, Washington, D.C. (designed 1904; dedicated 1905).
- St. Joseph's R.C. College, West End, Cincinnati, Ohio (built about 1905).
- Holy Trinity Roman Catholic Church, 1118 North Noble Street, Chicago, Illinois (prepared original design; built 1905–1906 to modified design prepared by others).
- Two-Story brick dwellings, 3336-3340 M Street NW, Washington, D.C. (completed 1906).
- Residence of the Apostolic Delegate to the United States, 1811 Biltmore Street NW, Washington, D.C. (built 1906; razed).
- St. Mary's R.C. Church, Helena, Montana (completed 1908).
- St. Charles Hall, Mount St. Charles College, now Carroll College, Helena, Montana (completed 1909).
- Cathedral School, Helena, Montana (built 1909; demolished about 2008).
- Convent of Perpetual Adoration/Blessed Sacrament Academy in Birmingham, Alabama (built 1911–1913).
- The Cathedral of St. Helena, Helena, Montana (built 1908–1914).
- The Pensacola Hospital, Pensacola, Florida (completed 1915).
- Arts and Science Building (additions), University of Ottawa, Ottawa, Ontario (completed 1922).
