= The Methodist Cemetery =

Historic site in Washington, D.C.

- Methodist Cemetery
- U.S. National Register of Historic Places
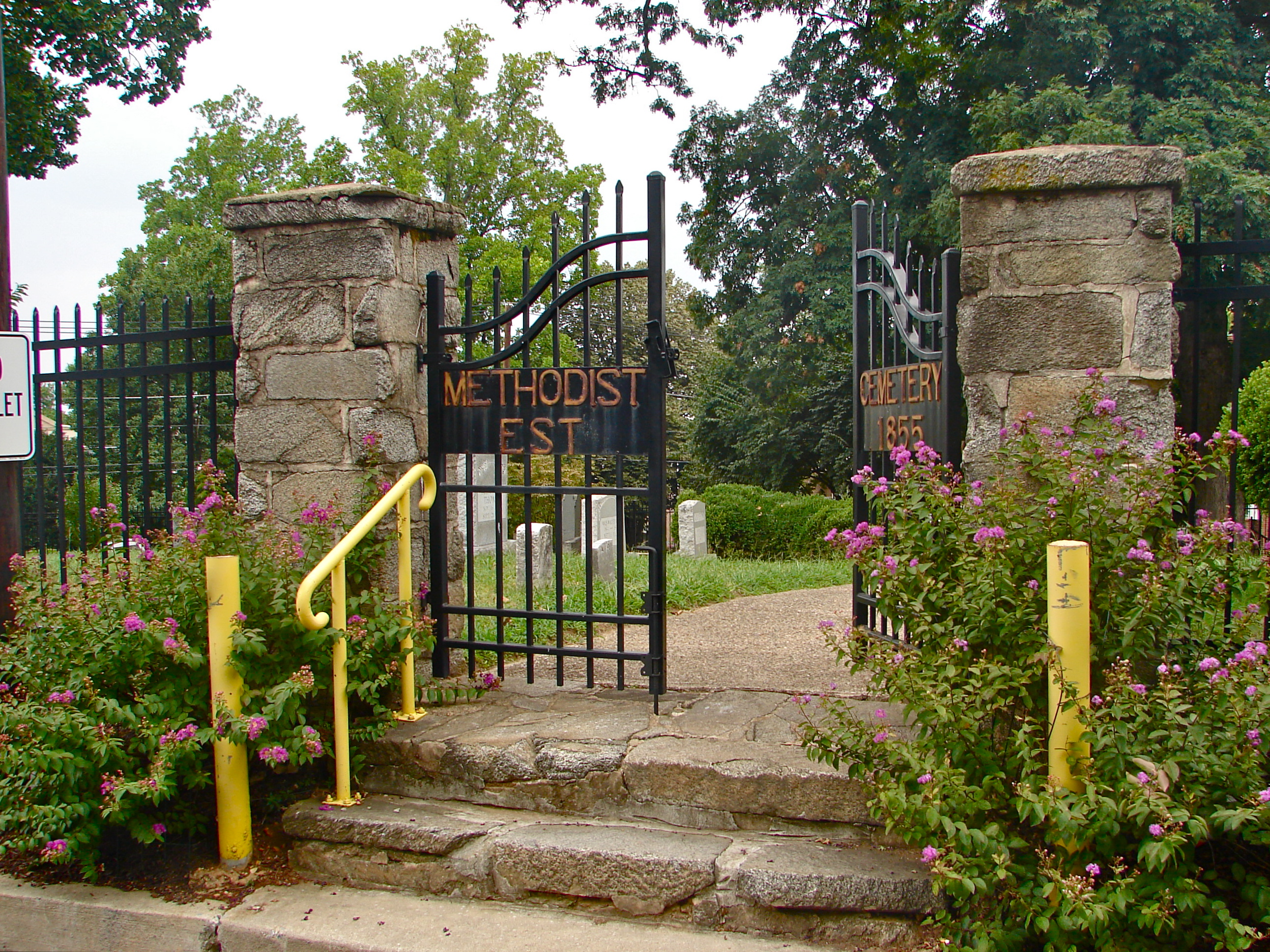

- Location within District of Columbia
- Location: Murdock Mill Rd. between River Rd. and 42nd St., Washington, D.C.
- Coordinates: 38.948738°N 77.08148°W
- Area: less than one acre
- Built: 1855
- MPS: Tenleytown in Washington, D.C.: 1770-1941, MPS
- NRHP reference No.: 08000839
- Added to NRHP: September 5, 2008

The Methodist Cemetery is an historic cemetery, located at Murdock Mill Road, between River Road, and 42nd Street, Northwest, Washington, D.C., in the Tenleytown neighborhood.

It is located behind the Eldbrooke United Methodist Church, also on the National Register of Historic Places.

== History ==
It was established in 1855, behind Mount Zion Methodist, renamed Eldbrooke United Methodist Church, and now The City Church.

It was listed in the District of Columbia Inventory of Historic Sites in 2008 and the NRHP since September 5, 2008.
