= The Rest (historic house) =

- U.S. National Register of Historic Places
- The Rest in 2026

- Location within the District of Columbia
- Location: 4343 39th St NW, Washington, D.C.
- Built: before 1801, 1890s
- Architectural style: Federal, Second Empire
- MPS: Tenleytown in Washington, DC: 1770-1941
- NRHP reference No.: 64501018

The Rest, also known as the Love-Lyles-Magruder House, is a historic house located at 4343 39th St NW in the Tenleytown neighborhood of Washington, D.C. Built before 1801, it was first the residence of Sarah Love, a first cousin of George Washington. It is a brick Federal structure painted white, with two full storeys in addition to a stone basement, dormers, and a Victorian Second Empire tower — built in the 1890s — from which the Capitol and Washington Monument may be viewed due to the high elevation of Tenleytown.

Its interior is well-preserved, with chestnut beams in the basement and built-in cabinetry in the front room dating to about the period of the house's construction. Owing to Sarah Love's relation to the Washingtons, the house once contained many Washington family heirlooms along with other relics of important local families, such as the Lees. It is a unique example of a rural plantation house fully absorbed into the urban landscape of Washington, D.C., as the street grid of the neighborhood was built around the house on land that formerly belonged to its estate.
