= N. Webster Chappell House =

Historic house in Washington, D.C., United States

- U.S. National Register of Historic Places
- D.C. Inventory of Historic Sites
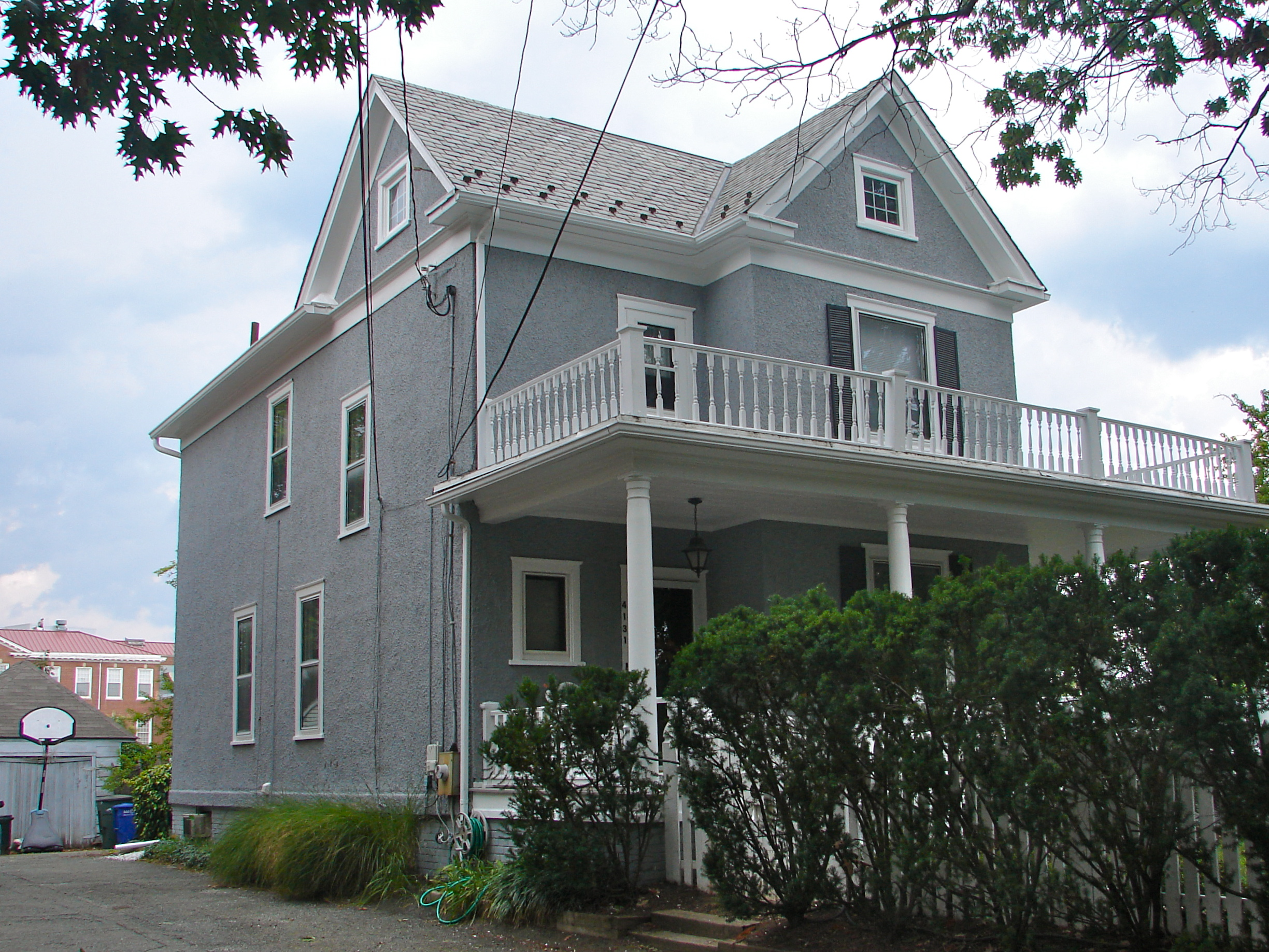

- Location within District of Columbia
- Location: 4131 Yuma St., N.W. Washington, D.C.
- Coordinates: 38°56′48″N 77°4′52″W
- Built: 1910
- Architectural style: Queen Anne
- MPS: Tenleytown in Washington, D.C.: 1770-1941, MPS
- NRHP reference No.: 11000379

Significant dates
- Added to NRHP: June 23, 2011
- Designated DCIHS: March 24, 2011

The N. Webster Chappell House is an historic Queen Anne style home, located at 4131 Yuma Street, Northwest, Washington, D.C., west of Tenley Circle, in the Tenleytown neighborhood.

It was built in 1910, and added to the National Register of Historic Places in 2011.
