= Tenleytown =

Neighborhood of Washington, D.C.

- Neighborhood of Washington, D.C.
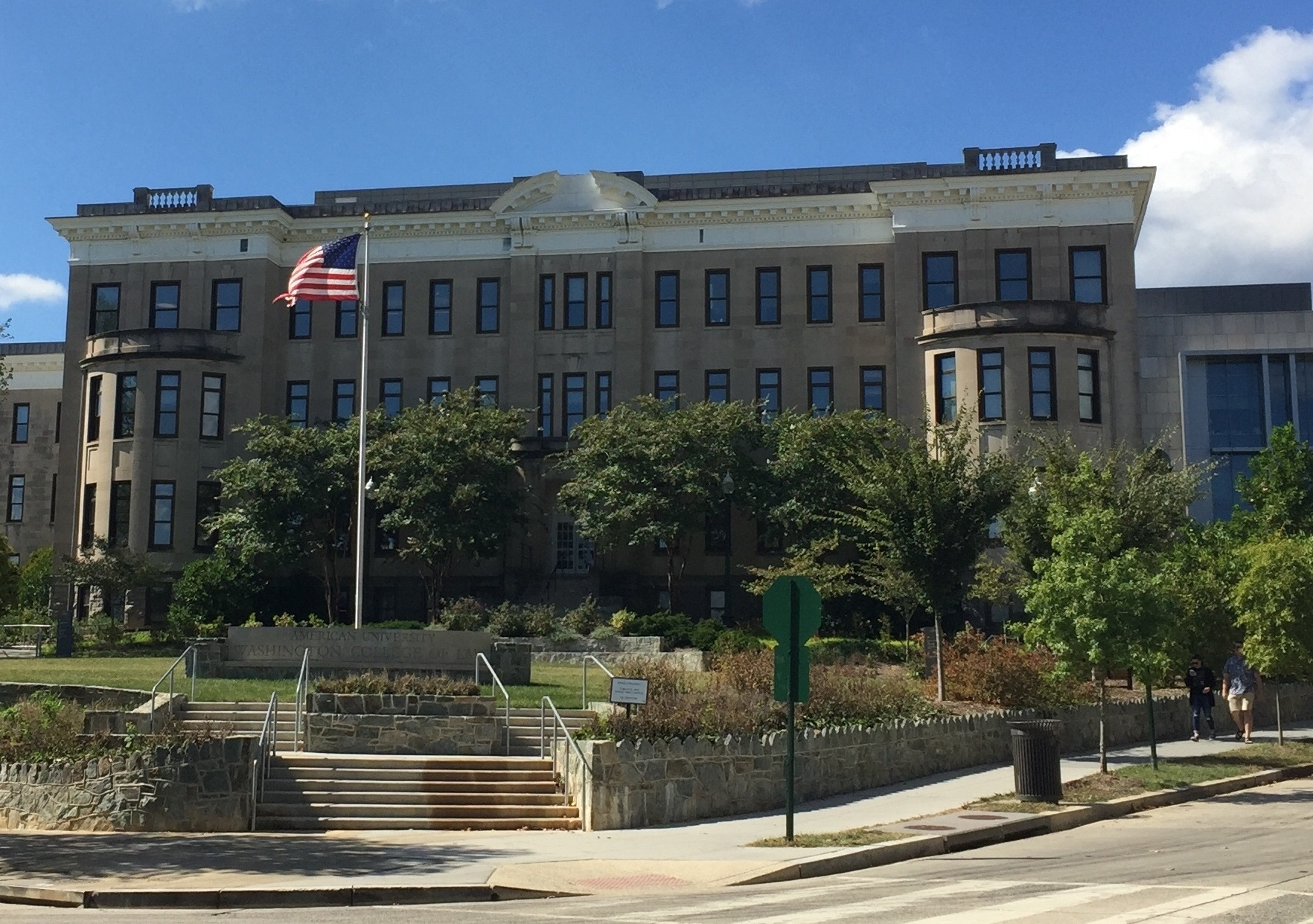
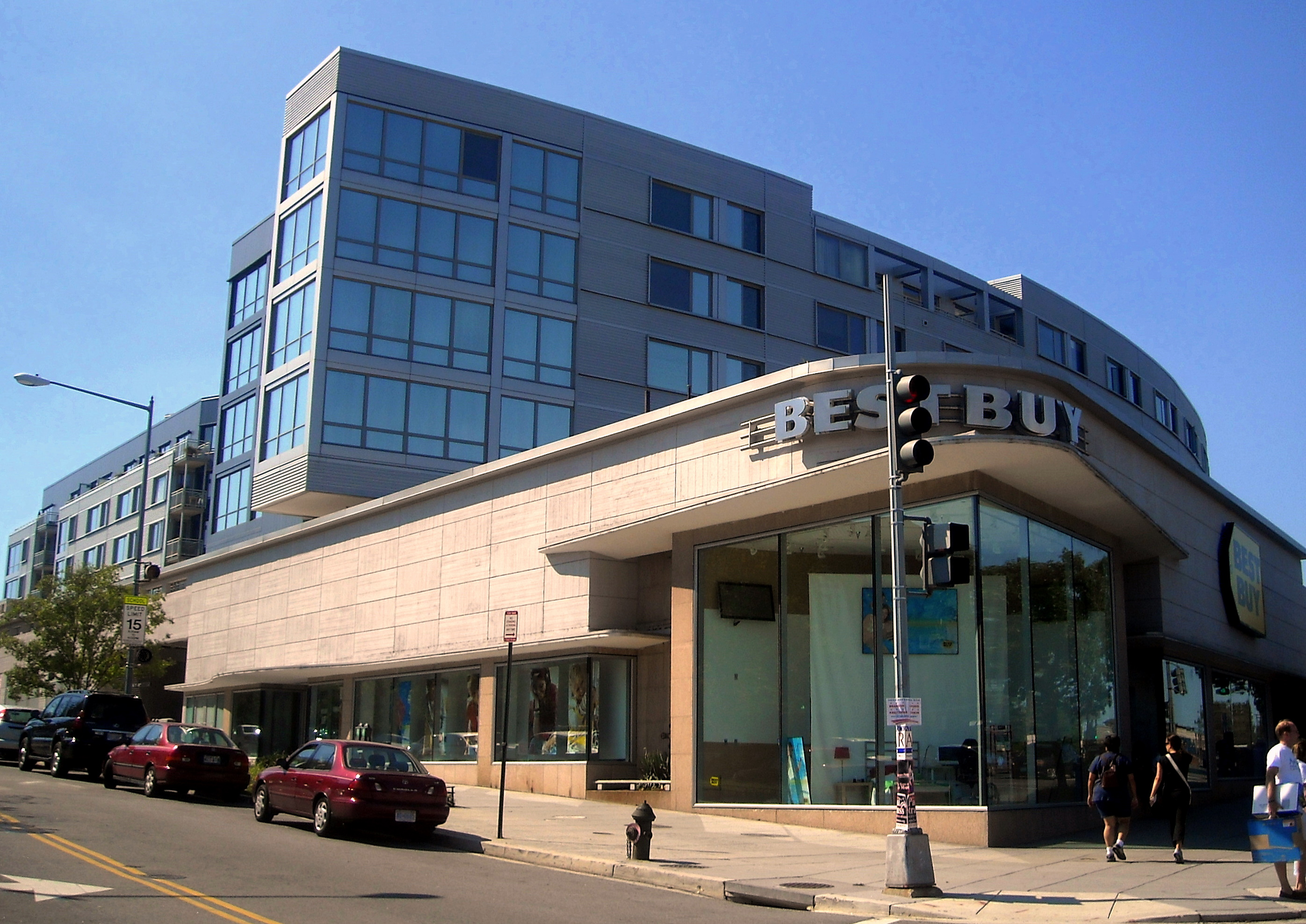
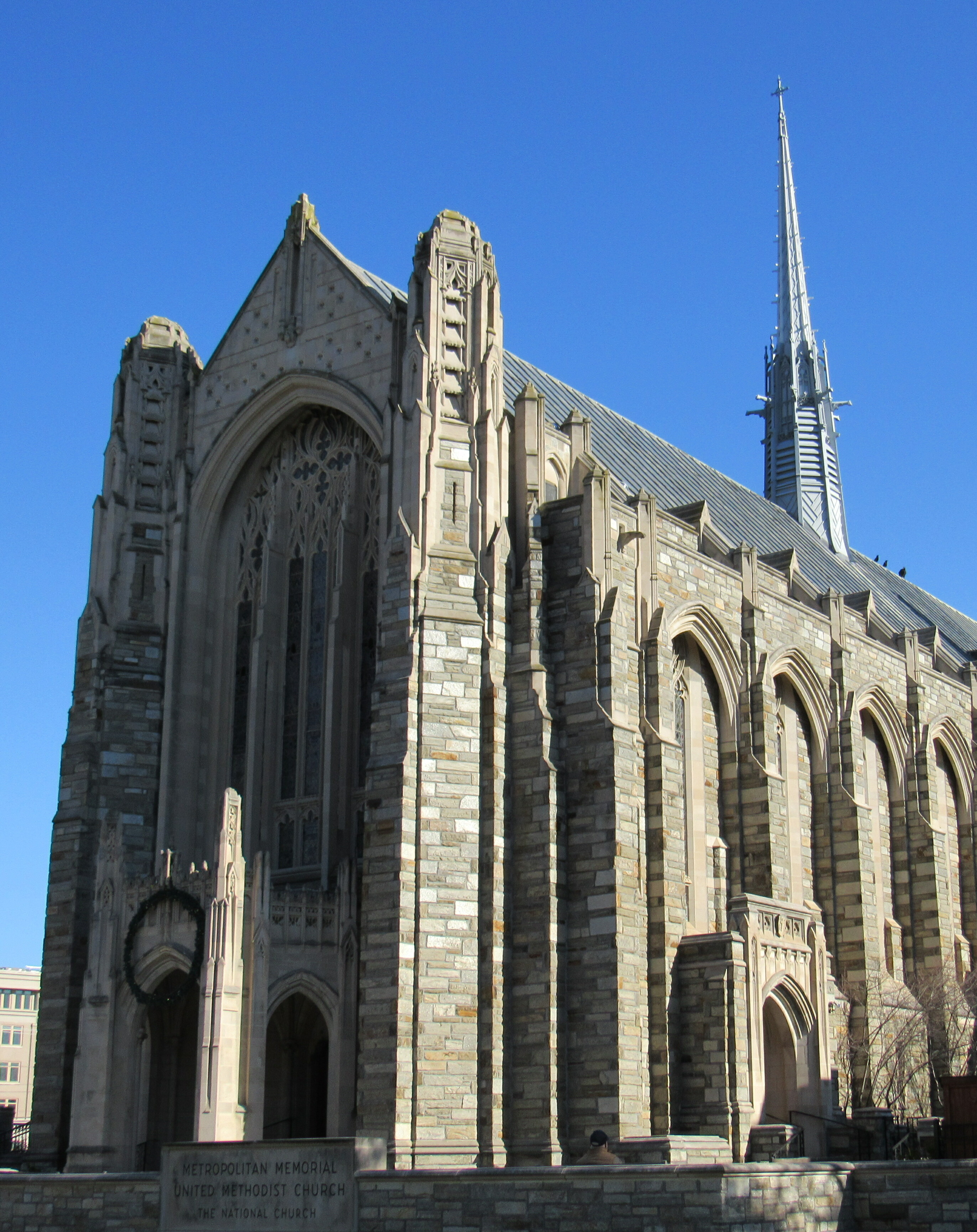
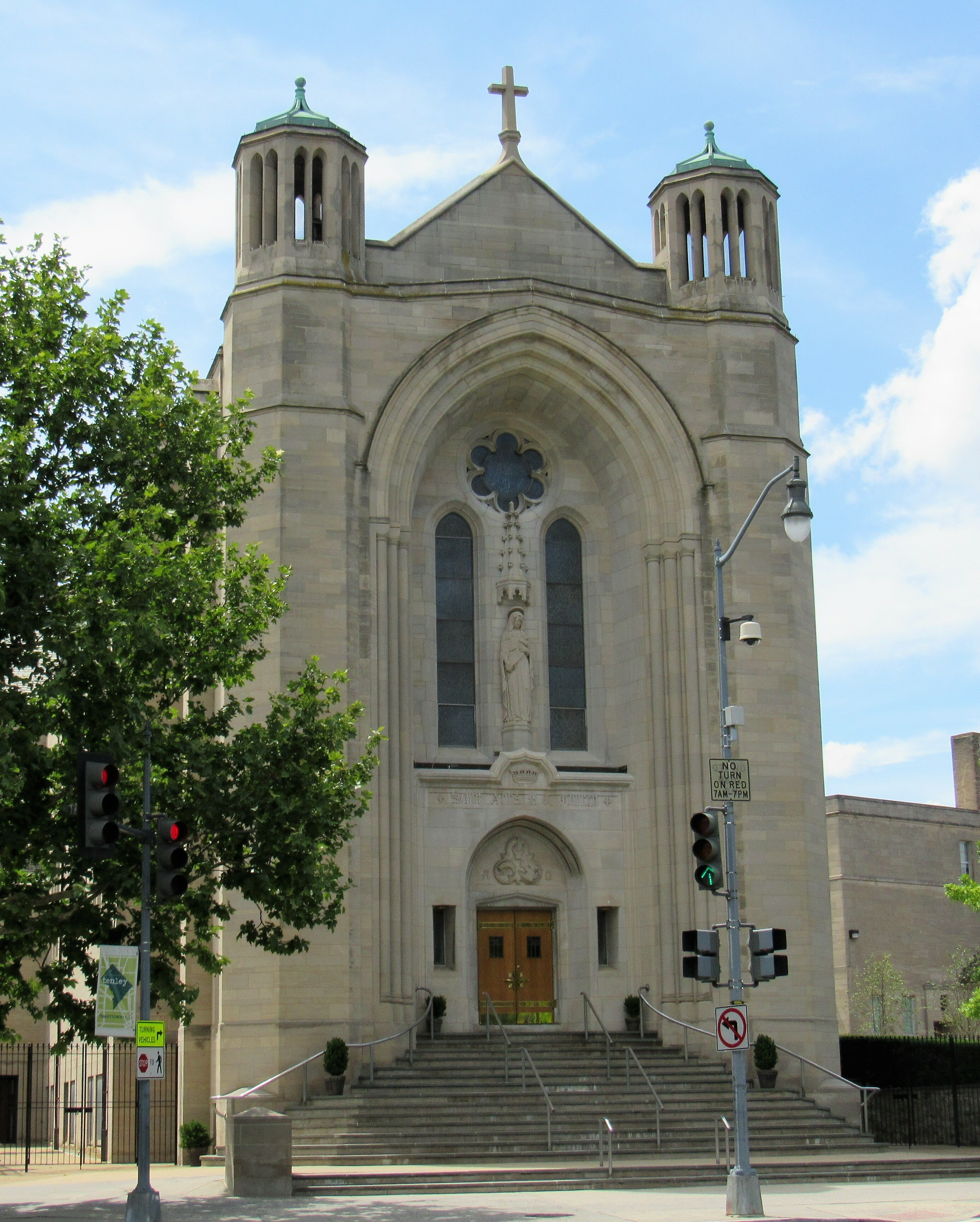
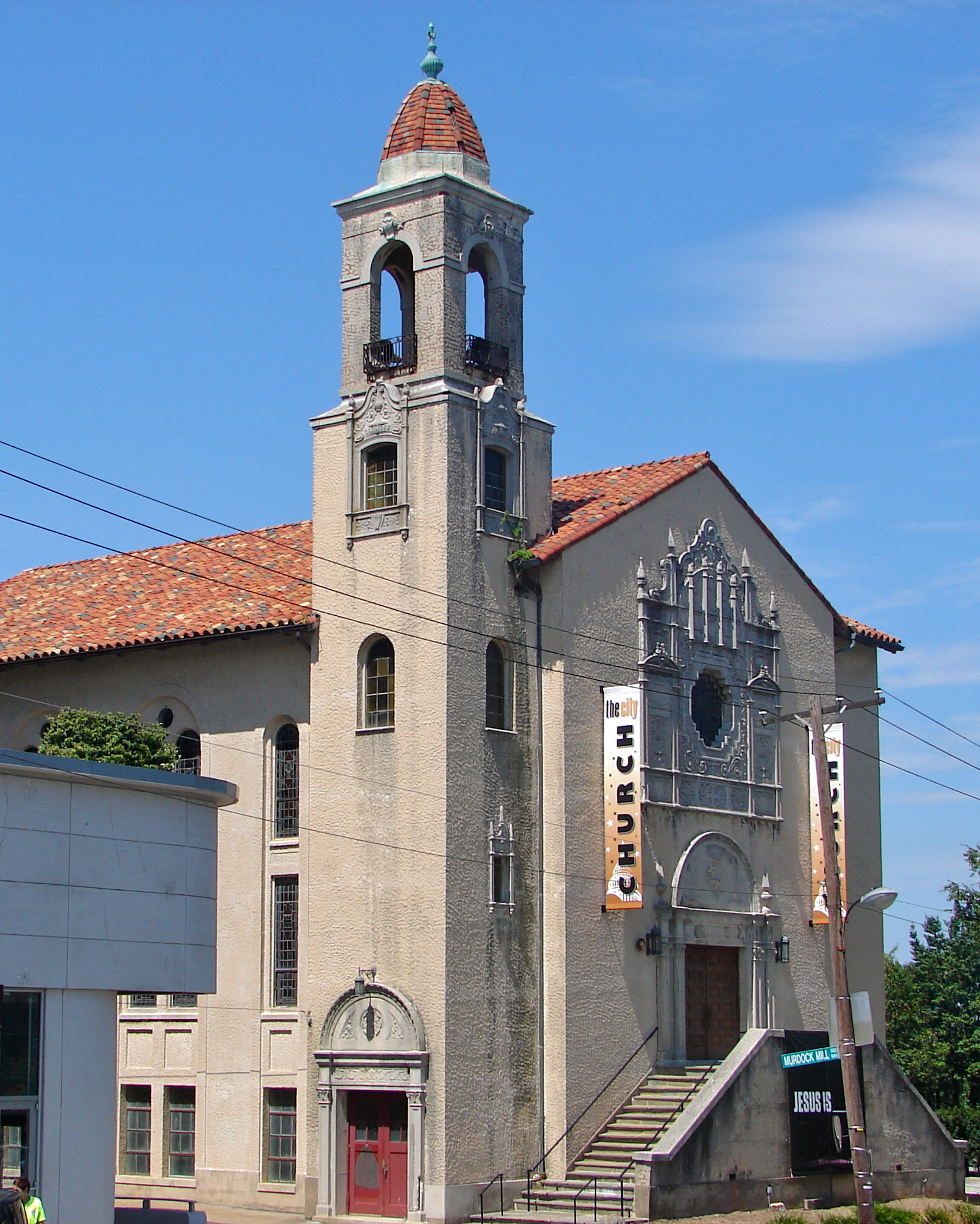
- Top: Washington College of Law (left) and Wisconsin Avenue (right); bottom: Metropolitan Memorial Church (left), St. Ann's Church (center), and Eldbrooke Church (right)

- Map of Washington, D.C., with Tenleytown highlighted in red
- Coordinates: 38.946°N 77.079°W
- Country: United States
- District: Washington, D.C.
- Ward: Ward 3

Government
  - Councilmember: Matthew Frumin
- Postal code: ZIP code
- Area code(s): 202, 771
- Website: http://tenleytowndc.org/

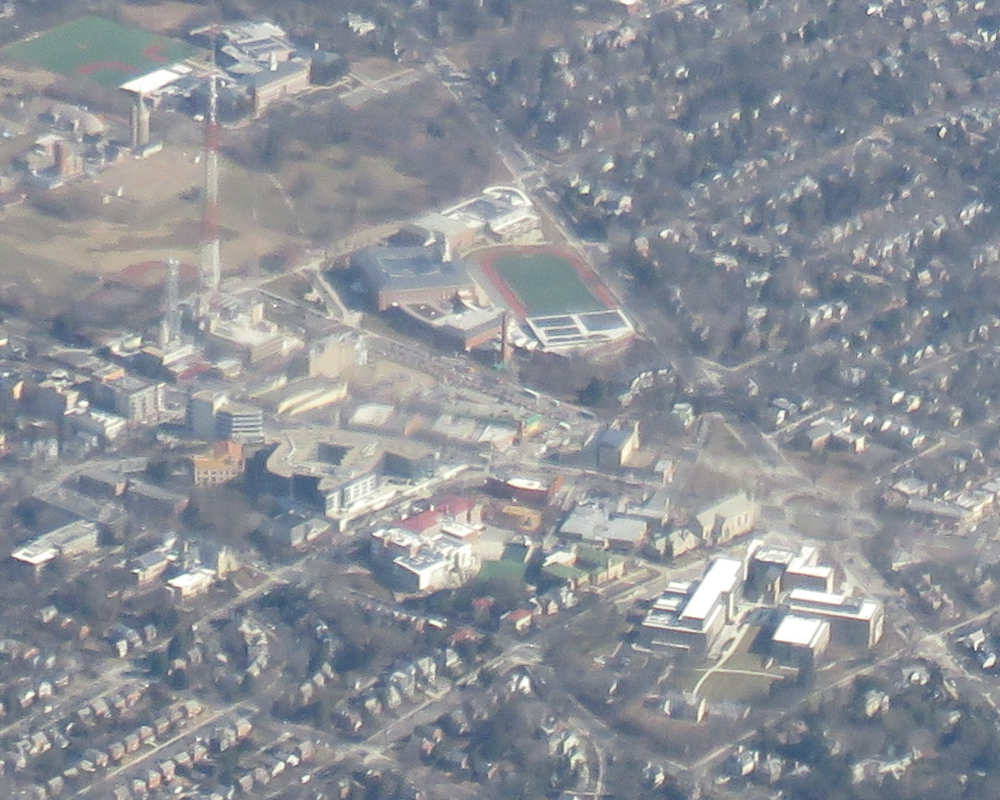
Aerial view of Tenleytown from the southwest, looking towards Fort Reno Park and Wakefield. Tenley Circle is at the bottom right.

Tenleytown is a historic neighborhood in the Northwest quadrant of Washington, D.C.

== History ==
In 1790, locals began calling the neighborhood "Tennally's Town" after area tavern owner John Tennally. Over time, the spelling has evolved and by the 19th century the area was commonly known by its current name, although the spelling Tennallytown continued to be used for some time in certain capacities, including streetcars through the 1920s.

The area is the site of Fort Reno, one of the forts that formed a ring around Washington, D.C. during the American Civil War to protect the capital against invasions. It proved to be the crucial lookout point for preventing a siege of Washington, because it is the highest natural elevation point in the District of Columbia.

Fort Reno was decommissioned with the surrender of the Confederate army. The last remains of Fort Reno were removed about 1900, when the land owned by the Dyer family was being prepared for a reservoir.

Due to its elevation it is also the site of an important Georgian plantation house. Charles Jones's home, called “The Rest,” is believed to have originally been built around 1700 and significantly expanded around 1800. This home stayed in the Jones family until 1920 when the Magruders (local grocers) bought the home. In 1974, the current family owning the home bought the house and still own it today.

After the American Civil War, what is now Fort Reno Park developed into an African-American community. This community existed in tension with the white residents of Tenleytown, as well as major landholders. Eventually, a coalition of groups persuaded the unelected government of D.C. and the Federal Government to clear the community for segregated neighborhood resources: Deal Middle School, a park, and a water tower. The Reno School building, built in 1903 for African-American students, is one of the few remaining traces of this community.

Within the park boundaries lies the highest natural point in the District of Columbia, 409 feet above sea level. Fort Reno also hosts community gardens, free rock concerts in the summer, sledding in the winter, and tennis courts, playing fields, and dog-walkers year round. Jackson-Reed HS baseball now uses the ball field for its home games.

Tenleytown was transformed on October 2, 1941, when Sears Roebuck opened its department store on Wisconsin Avenue at Albemarle Street. At the time the store was notable for its size and for its 300-car rooftop parking lot. In the 1990s, Sears abandoned its retail operation at the location and the building was used by Hechinger hardware until its demise in the late 1990s. In the 2000s, the building was converted to a mixed-use development complex called Cityline at Tenley, with luxury condominiums (The Cityline) on the top levels, a Best Buy (later closed and replaced by a Target store) and The Container Store at street level, and an Ace Hardware underground, located within the parking garage that serves the aforementioned stores. The west entrance to the Metro station is at the front of the building across from Whole Foods Market.

In 2010, the Top of the Town: Tenleytown Heritage Trail opened. Starting at the Tenleytown–AU metro station, the trail passes neighborhood landmarks such as American University, Fort Reno Park, and the studios of WRC-TV, Washington's NBC-affiliated station.

== Geographic impact ==
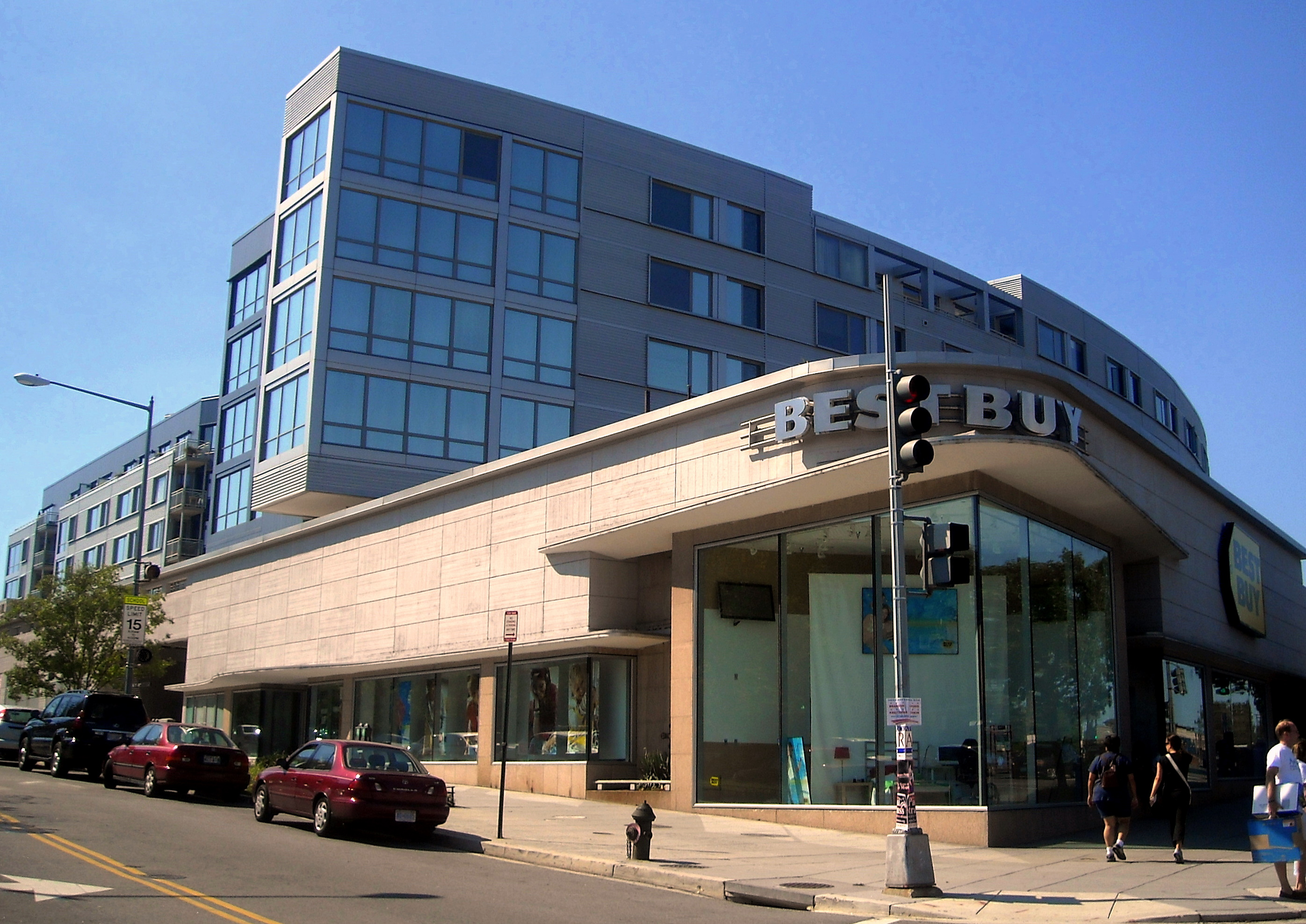
The Cityline Building, home to The Container Store, condominiums, and the west entrance of the Tenleytown-AU Station

The neighborhood is home to the highest point in Washington, Fort Reno Park, which houses a baseball field and a soccer field. Due to the high altitude, the neighborhood is home to nearly all of the city's radio masts and towers including the studios and/or towers for WRC-TV, WTTG, WUSA, WETA-TV, WHUT-TV, WDCA, WPXW-TV, WJLA-TV, and radio stations WAMU and WTOP-FM. American Tower started to build an even higher tower, 756 feet (about 230 meters) tall, which could support 169 transmitters, but the District of Columbia government reversed its position, and the incomplete tower was demolished in August 2006.

== Transportation ==
Tenleytown and adjacent American University Park are served by the Tenleytown–AU stop on the Washington Metro Red Line. American University offers a free shuttle bus between campus and the Tenleytown metro station at 40th and Albemarle Street, runs between the Metro stop and American University's main campus. The station is located in the heart of the neighborhood at the intersection of Wisconsin Avenue and Albemarle Street. Metrobus routes 31, 33, 96, D32, H2, H4, M4, N2, W45, and W47 serve the neighborhood, all making stops at the station.

The neighborhood is defined by Tenley Circle which lies at the intersection of Nebraska Avenue, Wisconsin Avenue, and Yuma Street. On Tenley Circle itself is St. Ann's Catholic Church, a large imposing stone church which serves area Catholics. On the opposite side of the circle is Wisconsin Avenue Baptist Church. American University's Washington College of Law, on the site of the former Immaculata School, also bounds the western edge of the circle.

== Education ==
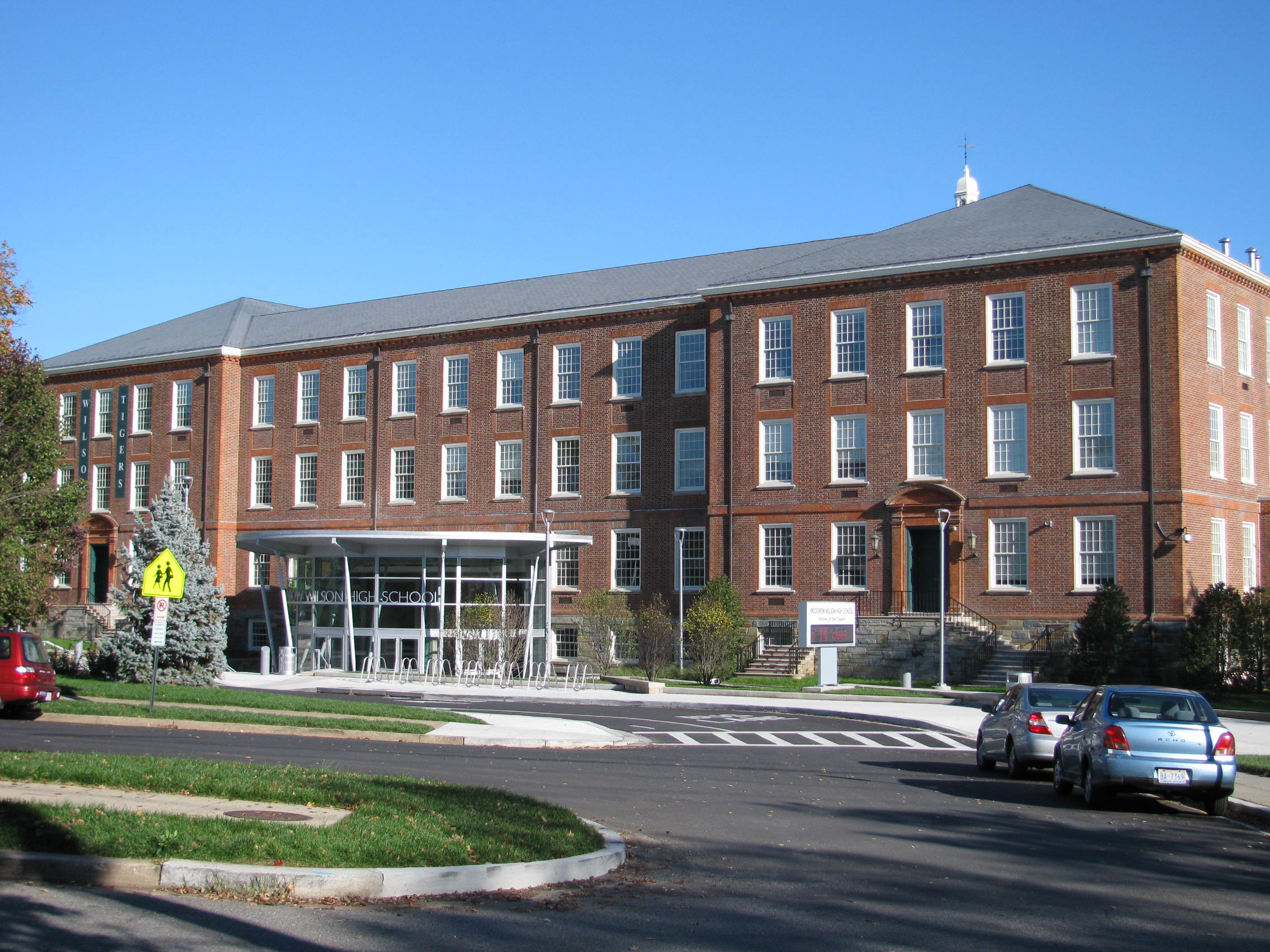
Jackson-Reed High School

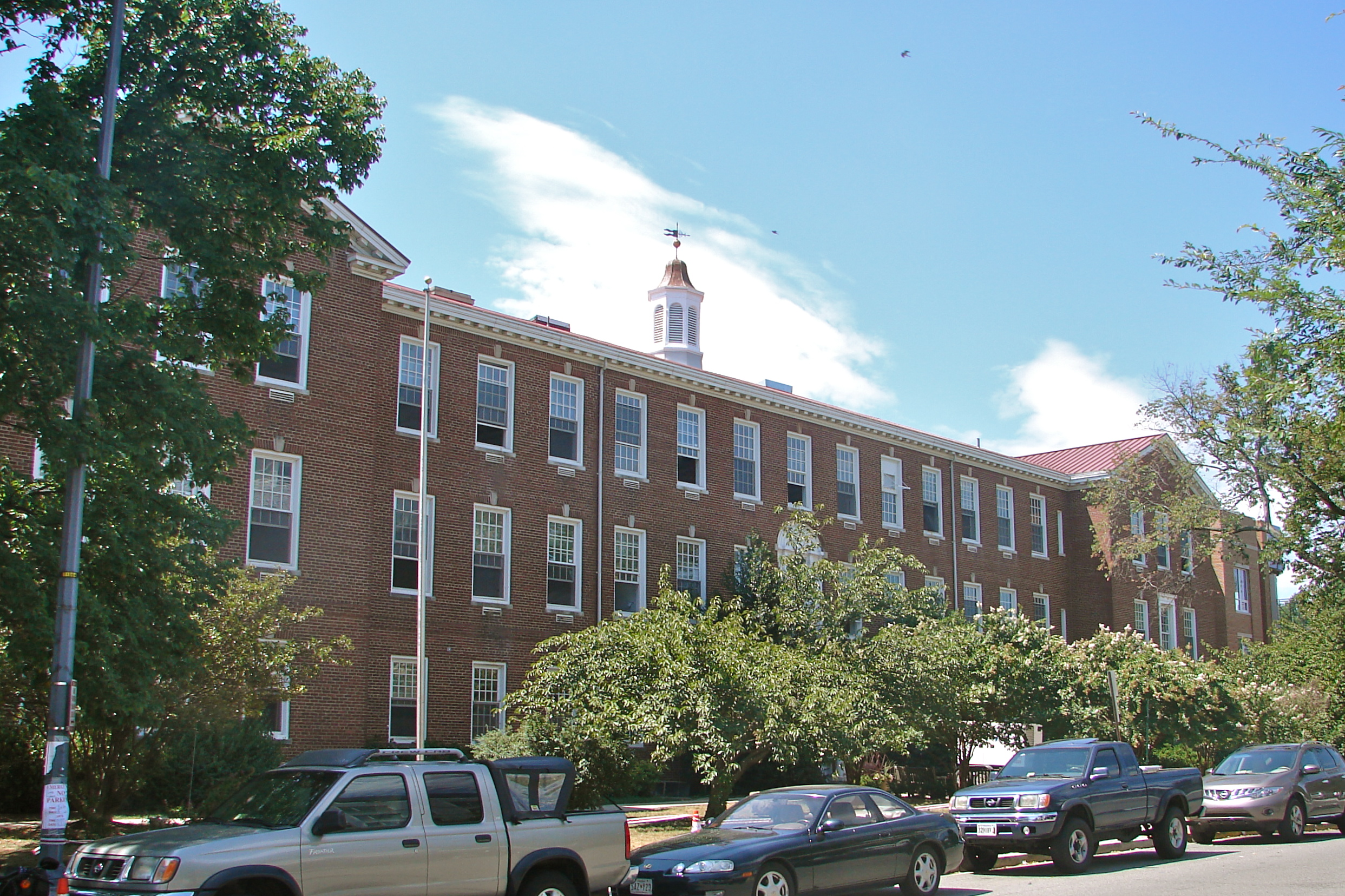
Janney Elementary School

The area is served by the District of Columbia Public Schools. Tenleytown is zoned to:

- Janney Elementary School
- Alice Deal Middle School
- Jackson-Reed High School

Tenleytown is the location of several independent schools, including National Presbyterian School (PS-6) and Georgetown Day School, whose 2021 campus expansion allowed its lower and middle schools to join the high school in Tenleytown.

The District of Columbia Public Library system operates the Tenley-Friendship Neighborhood Library, whose 2011 building sits at the corner of Wisconsin Avenue and Albemarle Streets.

== Historic landmarks ==
Several Tenleytown landmarks are listed on the National Register of Historic Places (NRHP). Residential listings include the N. Webster Chappell House, Dumblane, and Grant Road Historic District. Commercial properties listed on the NRHP include the Sears, Roebuck and Company Department Store and Chesapeake and Potomac Telephone Company, Cleveland-Emerson Exchange. Religious listings include Convent de Bon Secours, the Immaculata Seminary Historic District, and the Eldbrooke United Methodist Church and its adjoining Methodist Cemetery. There are two educational properties listed on the NRHP: Jackson-Reed High School and Janney Elementary School.
