= Sears, Roebuck and Company Department Store (Washington, D.C.) =

- U.S. National Register of Historic Places
- D.C. Inventory of Historic Sites
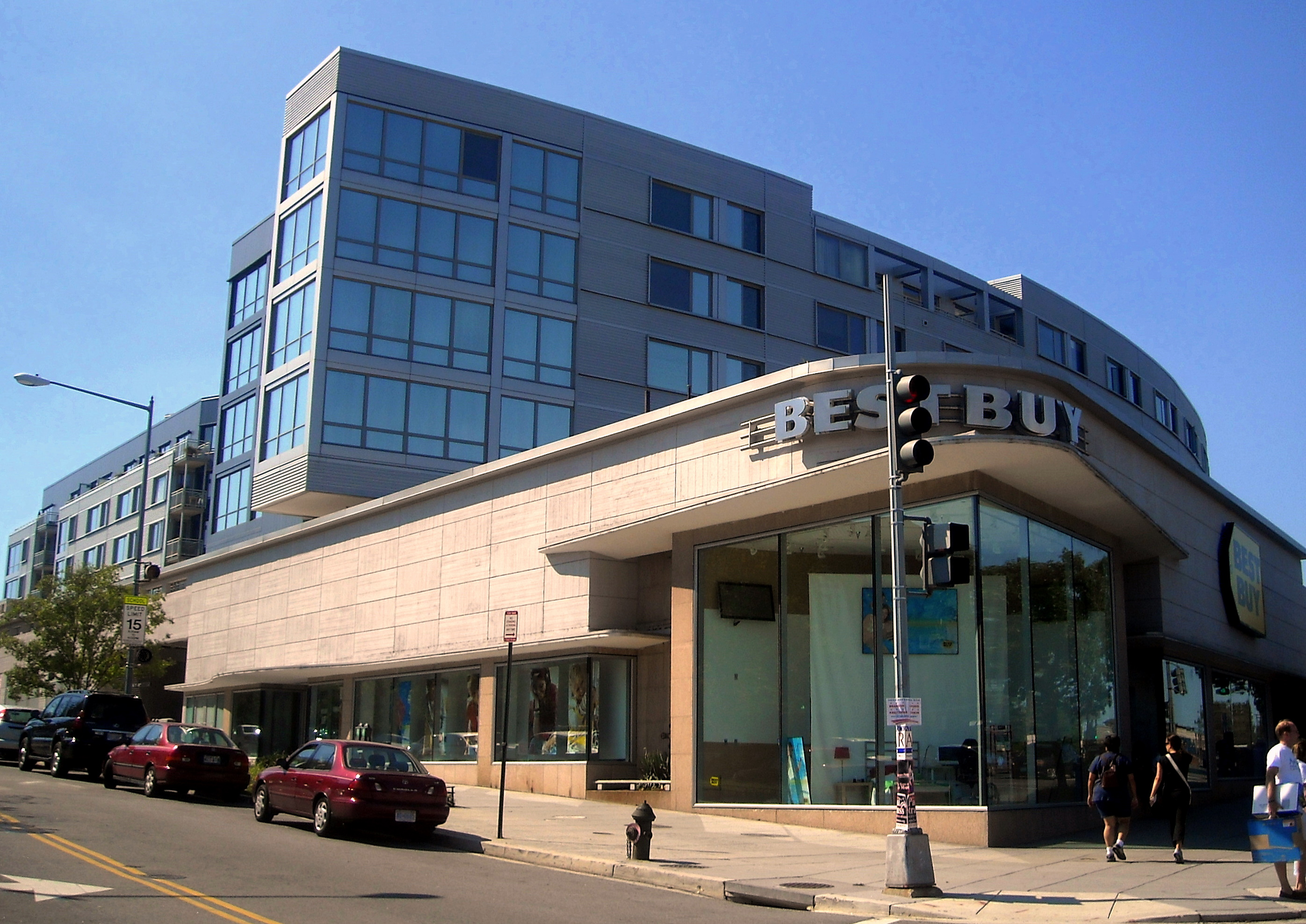
- Moderne building in 2008

- Location within District of Columbia Location within the United States
- Location: 4500 Wisconsin Avenue, N.W., Washington, D.C.
- Coordinates: 38.94805°N 77.08°W
- Built: 1941
- Architect: John Stokes Redden and John G. Raben
- Architectural style: Moderne
- NRHP reference No.: 96000061

Significant dates
- Added to NRHP: February 16, 1996
- Designated DCIHS: May 25, 1995

Sears, Roebuck and Company Department Store, also known as The Cityline Building, is an historic retail building, located at 4500 Wisconsin Avenue, Northwest, Washington, D.C., in the Tenleytown neighborhood.

== History ==
The Moderne building, was designed by John Stokes Redden and John G. Raben in 1941. Tenleytown was transformed on October 2, 1941, when Sears Roebuck opened its department store on Wisconsin Avenue at Albemarle Street. At the time the store was notable for its size, and for its 300 car rooftop parking lot. In 1975, the Wisconsin Avenue elevation was altered for the Tenleytown–AU (WMATA station). In the 1990s, Sears abandoned its retail operation at the location, and the building was used by Hechinger hardware until its demise in the late 1990s. It was added to the National Register of Historic Places, on February 16, 1996.

It was the location of the second Art-O-Matic, from September 29 to October 28, 2000.

In the 2000s, the building was converted to a mixed-use development complex called Cityline at Tenley, with luxury condos (The Cityline) on the top levels, a Best Buy and a Container Store at street level, and an Ace Hardware underground, located within the parking garage that serves the aforementioned stores.
