= Pensacola Hospital =

- U.S. National Register of Historic Places
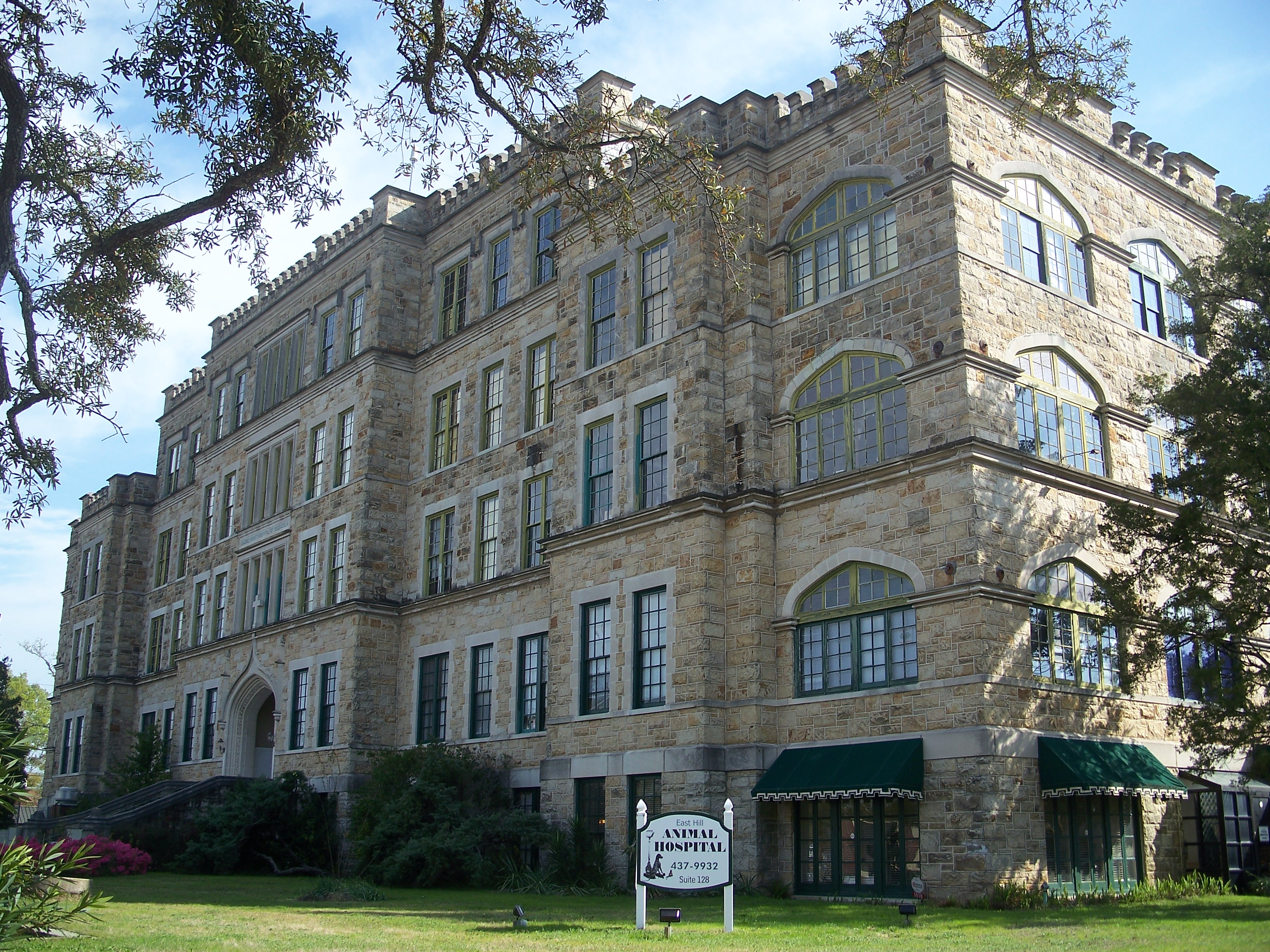

- Location within Florida Location within the United States
- Location: Pensacola, Florida
- Coordinates: 30°25′34″N 87°12′10″W
- Built: 1915
- Architect: A. O. Von Herbulis (Albert Olszewski)
- Architectural style: Late Gothic Revival
- NRHP reference No.: 82002373
- Added to NRHP: February 16, 1982

The Pensacola Hospital (also known as the Old Sacred Heart Hospital) was a hospital in Pensacola, Florida, United States, located at 1010 North 12th Avenue. On February 16, 1982, it was added to the United States National Register of Historic Places.

== History ==
Pensacola Hospital (1915)

Pensacola Hospital, now known as the historic Sacred Heart Hospital, opened in September 1915 as the first and oldest Catholic hospital in Florida. The Daughters of Charity, a religious order dating back to 1633 also dedicated to care for the poor and the sick, invested over $400,000 into building and opening this facility. The Daughters community was started originally in France by St. Vincent de Paul and St. Louise de Marillac.

Evans Brothers Construction, of Birmingham, Alabama, took one year to build this late Gothic Revival building for the Daughters to provide the residents of Pensacola with better health care.

This structure is both a medical and architectural landmark. Before this hospital, Pensacola had only a scattering of local clinics in converted houses. Doctors would send patients with serious cases as far away as New Orleans for complicated procedures not available in Pensacola. With this facility, Pensacola had the first surgical, radiological, bacterial, and therapeutical facilities in Florida. Following the Daughters of Charity motto of "service to all", the third level of the east wing was dedicated entirely to the Creole and Colored population so that they could also receive hospital care. A.O. Von Herbulis, a native of Austria who immigrated to the United States, designed the hospital. Using the vocabulary of English Gothic architecture, with elements such as the Tudor arches on the ends, the stone work around the front entrance, and the embattlement at the parapet, Von Herbulis created a lasting monument to health care.

In 1948, following the original desire of Mother Margaret O'Keefe, Pensacola Hospital's name changed to Sacred Heart Hospital of Pensacola. In 1965,50 years in its original stone structure on 12th Avenue, the hospital relocated in 1965 to a new hospital off to Ninth Avenue to continue its operations. Since then, Sacred Heart has continued to advance its technology and expand its services. After the hospital left, a private school for Liberal Arts used the building from 1969 through 1978, but lack of maintenance forced the school to abandon the building. In 1980, Tower East Group Inc. purchased the property to preserve the historic hospital for the future.

== Description ==
The building has several restaurants and a local theater company, as well as many private offices. Tower East Group Inc., a private enterprise, has been restoring and renovating this Late Gothic Revival landmark since March 1980. National Park Guidelines for historic preservation are followed voluntarily; however, no Federal or State funding has ever been received. Structurally, the building has received very few alterations in its history. The exterior stonework retains its Gothic appearance to this day and other original architectural details, such as the elaborate oak entrance doors, remain.

Dubbed "the heart of East Hill", it is currently home to a Montessori school and several local eateries including a gelato shop, pizza parlor, and restaurant/brewery.
