= Tenley-Friendship Neighborhood Library =

District of Columbia Public Library in the Tenleytown neighborhood

- The library in 2011
- 38.947659°N 77.079812°W
- Location: 4450 Wisconsin Ave. NW Washington, DC 20016, United States
- Type: Public library
- Branch of: District of Columbia Public Library

Other information
- Website: https://www.dclibrary.org/tenley

The Tenley-Friendship Neighborhood Library is a branch of the District of Columbia Public Library in the Tenleytown neighborhood of Washington, D.C. Located at 4450 Wisconsin Avenue NW, it services the neighborhoods of Tenleytown and Friendship Heights. A public library branch first opened in the area in 1926, and a library at the current site opened in 1960. A redesigned library branch was built at a cost of $18 million and opened in 2011. The Washington Post described the new library building, which featured a green roof and other sustainable-design features, as "one of the best things for D.C. in decades", though it experienced years of problems with a leaky roof.
