= Tenley Circle =

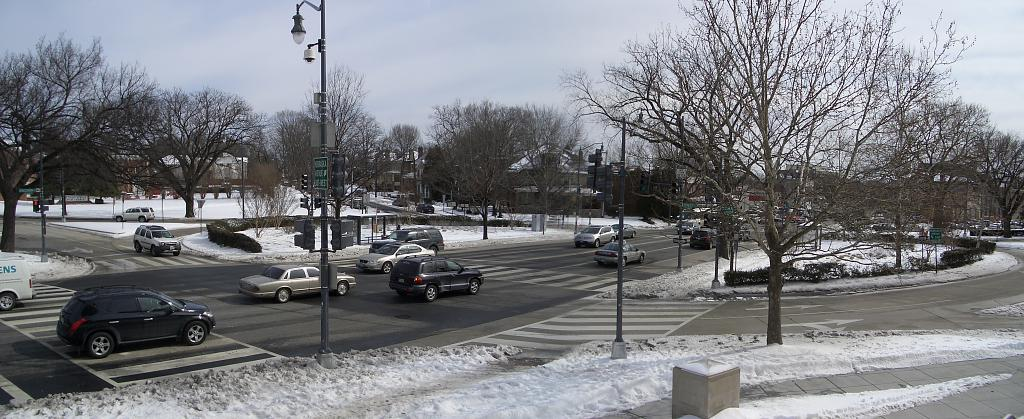
- Panoramic view of Tenley Circle in 2007
- Interactive map of Tenley Circle
- Namesake: John Tenally, later shortened to Tenley
- Type: Traffic circle
- Owner: District of Columbia
- Maintained by: DDOT, National Park Service
- Location: Tenleytown, Washington, D.C.
- Nearest metro station: Tenleytown–AU
- Coordinates: 38°56′46″N 77°4′44″W

Tenley Circle is a traffic circle in the Northwest Washington, D.C. neighborhood of Tenleytown. Tenley Circle lies at the intersection of Nebraska Avenue, Wisconsin Avenue, and Yuma Street. Unlike many of the circles in Washington, Tenley's traffic pattern has evolved such that the dominant roadway, Wisconsin Avenue, can pass straight through the center instead of going around the outside circumference.

== Description ==
The circle is bounded by St. Ann Catholic Church, a large imposing stone church, American University's Washington College of Law, and Wisconsin Avenue Baptist Church.

The circle is an important transportation hub for area residents, featuring stops for the Washington Metro's 31, 33, 96, H2, H4, M4, and N2 bus routes. The Tenleytown–AU Metro station is one block north of the circle, where one is able to catch a free shuttle to the main campus of American University a little less than a mile away, as well as to the Spring Valley annex.

== History ==
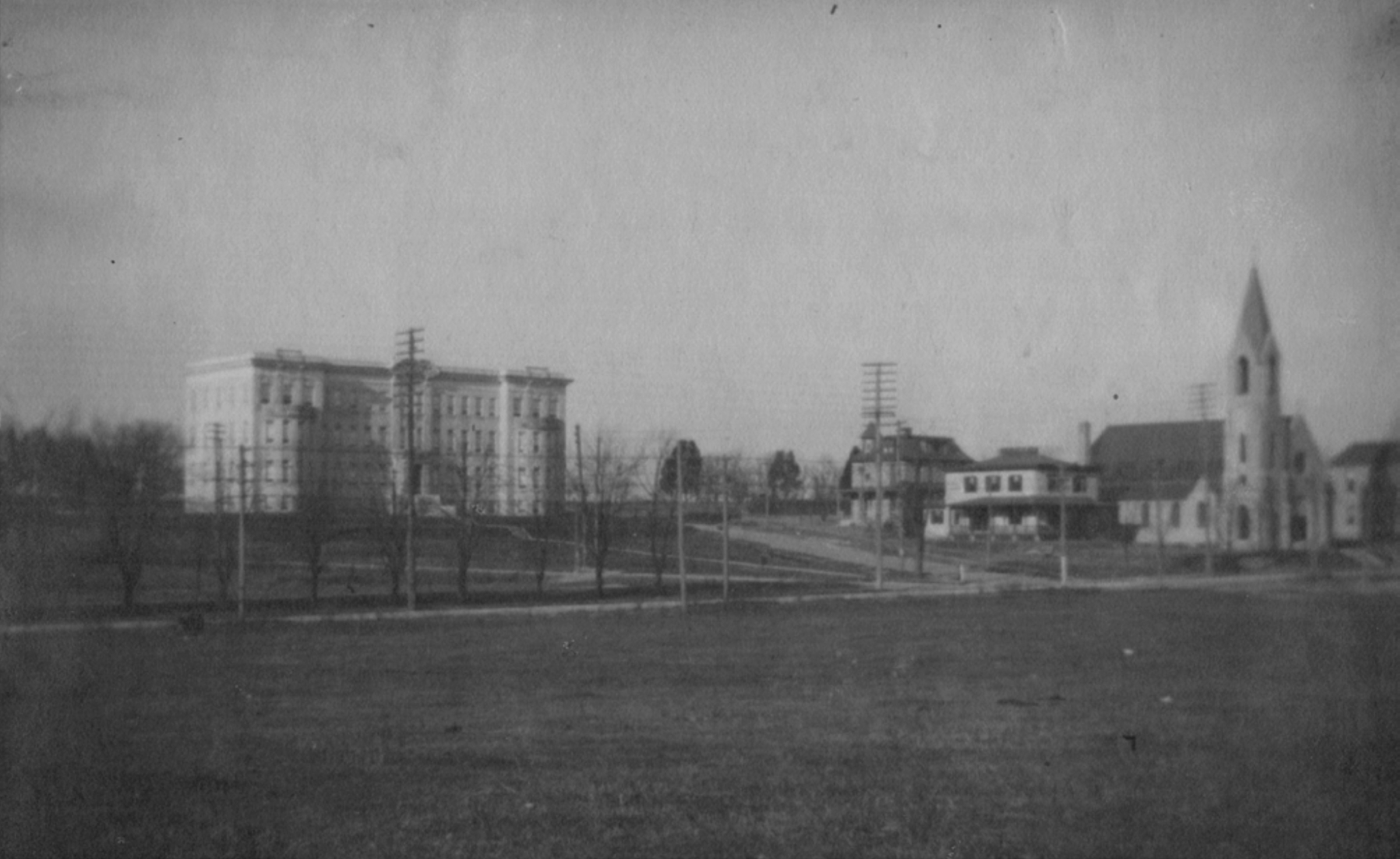
The intersection of Wisconsin and Nebraska Avenues and Yuma Street in 1905. Prominent are the old Saint Ann Church (right) and the still-extant Immaculata Seminary building (left).

Into the late nineteenth century, much of Northwest Washington west of the Rock Creek valley was rural, with Wisconsin Avenue (then known as "Georgetown and Rockville Pike" or "the Tenley Road" in Tenleytown) being one of the only major roads through the area. In 1902, as part of a report to the United States Senate Committee on the District of Columbia, the D.C. Park Commission proposed that a traffic circle be constructed at the junction of Wisconsin and Nebraska Avenues.

In 1926, after multiple accidents were caused by Wisconsin Avenue motorists following streetcar tracks through the center of the unpaved circle, D.C. Traffic Director M. O. Eldridge recommended that Wisconsin Avenue's paving follow the tracks, "leaving half moons of grass parking on each side." On May 27, 1927, the District of Columbia's Board of Commissioners voted to officially name the circle after eighteenth century local resident and tavern owner, John Tenley, who is also the namesake of the surrounding neighborhood.

== Future development ==
The National Park Service's 2016 "Memorials for the Future" competition included Tenley Circle as a potential location within Washington for a new national memorial.

Since 2017, Sunrise Senior Living has been in negotiations with Wisconsin Avenue Baptist Church and neighborhood groups to build a four-story assisted living facility on an unused lot fronting the eastern boundary of Tenley Circle.

== See also ==
- List of circles in Washington, D.C.
