= Anne Mills Archbold =

American philanthropist (1873–1968)

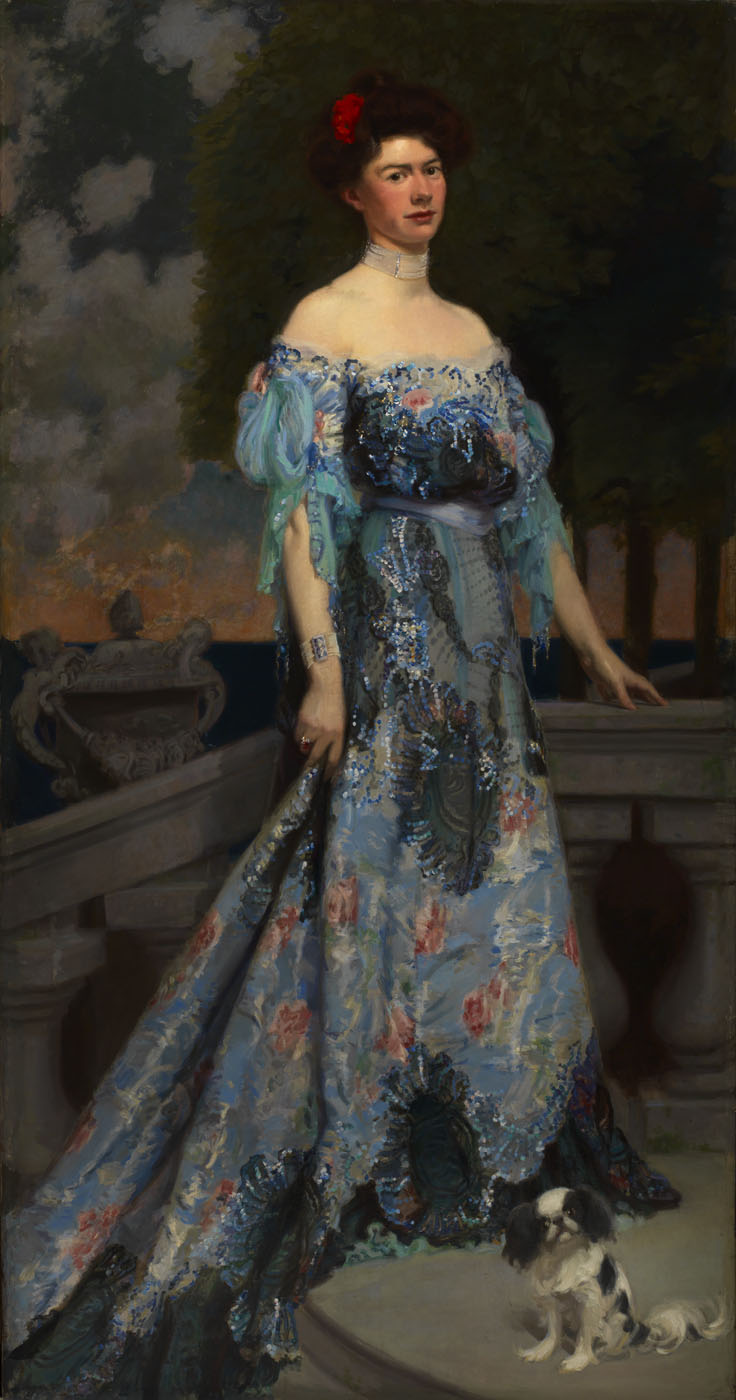
Portrait of Archbold by Frederick William MacMonnies, 1903

Anne Mills Archbold (November 24, 1873 – March 26, 1968) was an American heiress, big game hunter and philanthropist. Her father was the wealthy oil tycoon John Dustin Archbold and Archbold traveled extensively including to study in Paris and Florence. In 1903 she commissioned an unusual house in Bar Harbor, Maine, inspired by Tuscan villas. She married Armar Dayrolles Saunderson, son of British politician Edward James Saunderson, in 1906 having met in Tibet and had a short engagement. The couple had four children and Archbold became a keen hunter, donating trophies to several natural history museums.

Archbold separated from Saunderson in 1922, fleeing Britain on a Standard Oil steamship with her children, who had been made wards of court. After a divorce settlement, Archbold gave her English estate, Foxlease, to the Girl Guides. She settled in Washington, D.C., and became active in women's rights, as a member of the National Woman's Party and a supporter of the Equal Rights Amendment. She made donations to hospitals and social welfare programs and in 1924, with banker Charles C. Glover, she donated 100 acres (40 ha) of land to the National Capital Planning Commission; this became Glover-Archbold Park. Archbold fought several legal campaigns to save the park from highway development.

== Early life ==
Archbold was born in New York City on November 24, 1873; the second child of American oil tycoon John Dustin Archbold and his wife Annie Eliza Mills, she had a younger brother and two sisters. Her father became very wealthy after his small refining company was bought out by John D. Rockefeller and he rose rapidly in Rockefeller's Standard Oil company. The family moved to the Cedar Cliff estate in Tarrytown, New York, in 1885. The family wealth allowed Archbold to travel extensively, from around 1890, and she received part of her education in Paris and Florence.

In 1903 Archbold's portrait was painted by Frederick William MacMonnies. That same year she started construction of Archbold Cottage at Bar Harbor, Maine, based on a model Archbold had had made while in Paris. Finished in 1904, the cottage was designed by Frederick Lincoln Savage and inspired by villas Archbold had seen in Tuscany. It featured a terraced garden with fountain and 12 stucco arches overlooking a forest, mountains and the ocean. From the principal bedroom a spiral staircase led to a tower with panoramic views and a bathroom. A local newspaper described it as one of the most unique homes in Bar Harbor and as Savage's most exotic and unusual commission. The structure burnt down in 1947.

== Marriage ==
In 1906 Archbold made a tour of the Far East, passing through Hong Kong and becoming one of the first Western women to visit Tibet. In Tibet she met Armar Dayrolles Saunderson, son of British member of parliament and Leader of the Ulster Unionist Party Edward James Saunderson. Archbold's engagement to Saunderson was announced in the US on June 14, 1906. On June 16 English newspapers announced that the wedding had already taken place on Cuttyhunk Island in Buzzard's Bay, Massachusetts. The couple were at Saundersons' family seat, Castle Saunderson in Ireland, by October and honeymooned in Europe. Their first child, Lydia Ann, was born in France and was sponsored at her baptism by Grand Duke Michael Mikhailovich of Russia and presented at the British court.

The death of Saunderson's father in 1906 allowed him to purchase the Foxlease estate in Hampshire, England. Archbold, Saunderson and Lydia traveled to the US on the RMS Lusitania in 1908, making headlines for bringing with them two lion cubs the family had captured on a big game hunt in Africa. The lions were not permitted to be taken beyond the docks and ended up as star attractions at the Bronx Zoo. Archbold was a keen hunter, she donated big game trophies to several natural history museums and had others made into exotic furnishings. Archbold and Saunderson discussed big game hunting in Africa with Theodore Roosevelt at Oyster Bay in 1910. Archbold also held records for big game fishing.

Archbold gave birth to her second child and first son, Armar Edward, in 1909. A second son, John Dana, was born at Bar Harbor, Maine, in 1911 and her last child, a daughter, Moira, was born in 1912. After her father's death in 1916 Archbold received a two-ninths share of his estate, with her share worth around $9 million.

Archbold separated from Saunderson in 1922 with US papers claiming she had been "held virtually captive" and Archbold quickly left Britain on a Standard Oil steamship with her children, despite them having been made wards of court. The divorce settlement left Foxlease to Archbold who, keen to sever all ties to England, wanted to give it to the Girl Guides. The Guides did not want to own the property as they were concerned about upkeep costs. The 24-bedroom house and 65 acres (26 ha) estate were instead donated to Princess Mary who gave it to a trust for the use of the Guides, who used it as a training and activity centre. Archbold and her children, who had used the Saunderson name, reverted to Archbold after the divorce.

== Washington, D.C. ==
On her return to the US Archbold rented the Greystones estate, near Rock Creek Park, Washington, D.C., for six months before she purchased 60 acres (24 ha) of land on Reservoir Road where she built Hillandale, a house designed by Josephine Wright Chapman in the style of a Spanish villa. She also maintained houses in Maine and Rhode Island and often traveled to Florida, New York and the Bahamas.

At Hillandale, Archbold trained German Shepherd dogs for use by the visually impaired and police forces. Archbold was a member of the National Woman's Party and a keen supporter of the Equal Rights Amendment. In 1923 she was among a group of women that "invade[d] the offices of the senators and congressmen from their states, to ask them to vote for Equal Rights" and she personally petitioned president Warren G. Harding on the amendment. Archbold also donated large sums of money to hospitals and social welfare programs.

Possibly inspired by Moira's marriage to an explorer of southeast Asia, Archbold commissioned a diesel-powered replica of a 15th-century Chinese junk, the Cheng Ho, and took two expeditions on the vessel, collecting botanical and zoological samples in the Maluku Islands and Melanesia.

=== Glover-Archbold Park ===
On November 10, 1924, with Washington banker Charles C. Glover, Archbold donated 100 acres (40 ha) of land around the Foundry Branch of the Potomac River to the National Capital Planning Commission. The land now forms the majority of Glover-Archbold Park. Archbold was keen to establish the land, which contained excellent examples of beech, elm, and oak trees characteristic of the area before settlement, as a greenspace safeguarded from urban encroachment for the use of citizens of the city.

The park was threatened in 1947 with plans for a 4-lane highway to run through it. Archbold and Glover's son opposed the development, with Archbold noting "It is beautifully wooded, with a wealth of wild flowers and bird life. Quiet pathways lead down its sides along the meandering creek bed with its sycamore-tulip tangles, furnishing restful retreats for adults and fascinating children. Such a beautiful park cannot be eliminated if Washington is to grow as a living organism with its parts in proper balance". Another highway plan came under the Federal-Aid Highway Act of 1956, threatening around half of the park. Archbold opposed the scheme, retaining the Douglas, Obear & Campbell law firm at a cost of $10,000. Archbold secured the support of Secretary of the Interior Stewart Udall and, after a public meeting, the plans were amended on January 7, 1958, to save the park. The campaign led to proposals that the park be transferred to the NPS, though this was not immediately achieved.

A revived plan in 1959 was also opposed by Archbold in the District Court, again retaining Douglas, Obear & Campbell at a cost of $25,500, though the case was dropped when the so-called "Northwest Freeze" of the National Capital Transportation Act 1960 prohibited any highway development in an area of northwest DC. A further plan in 1962 to site part of the Three Sisters Bridge and associated highway on the park was defeated with Archbold paying $4,500 in legal fees. After this scheme was dropped in 1967 legislation passed transferring the park to the National Park Service.

== Death and legacy ==
Archbold died of a heart attack at her winter home in Nassau on March 26, 1968. After a funeral at Hillandale she was buried at Ivy Hill Cemetery in Upperville, Virginia, near her son John's Foxlease Farms estate. Her estate won a 1972 case in the United States Court of Claims for her Glover-Archbold Park legal fees to be counted as tax-deductible charitable contributions.
