= Burleith =

Neighborhood in Washington, D.C., United States

- Neighborhood of Washington, D.C.
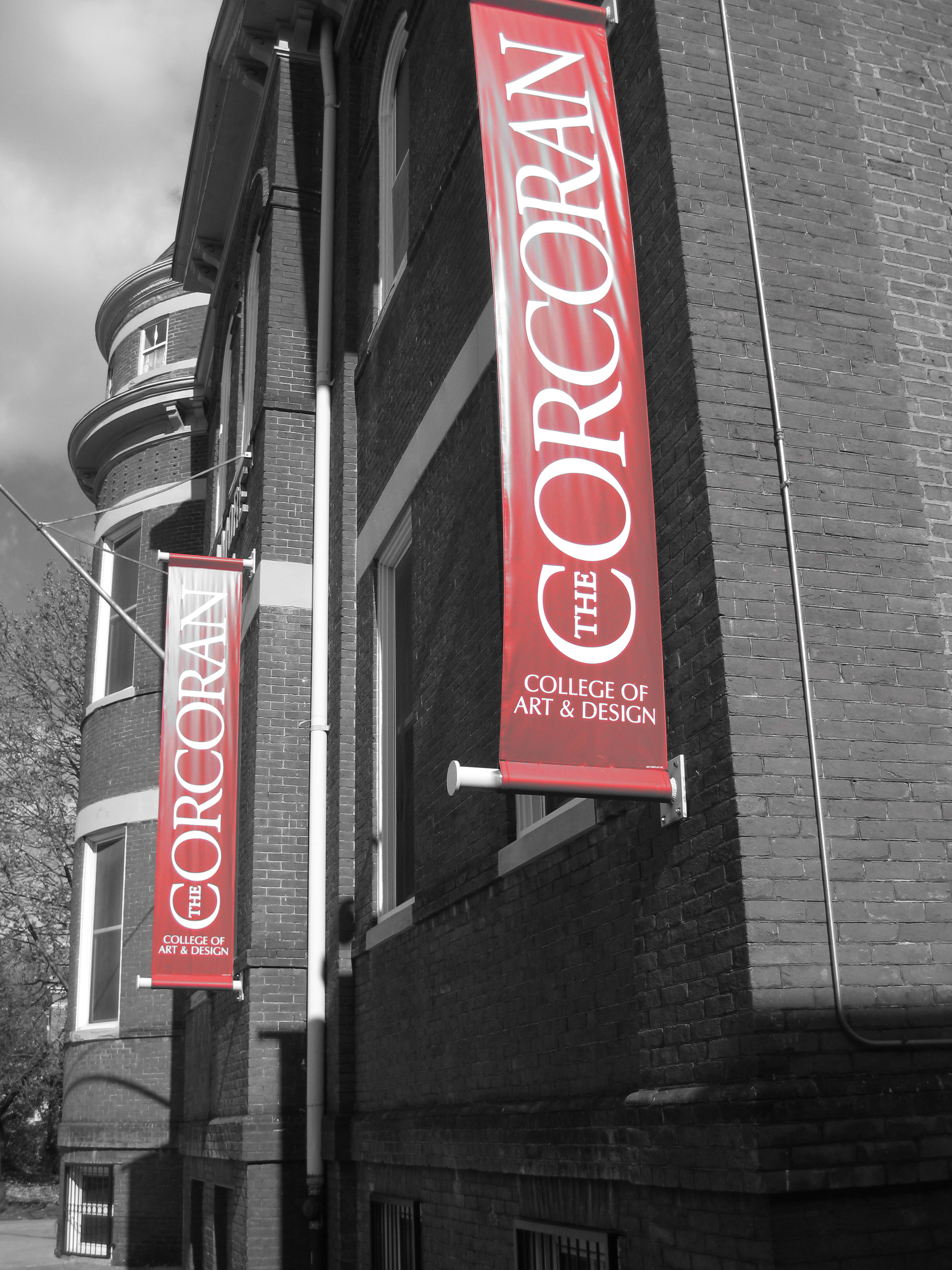
- Corcoran School in Burleith

- Burleith within the District of Columbia
- Coordinates: 38.9153°N 77.0728°W
- Country: United States
- District: Washington, D.C.
- Ward: Ward 2

Government
  - Councilmember: Brooke Pinto
- Postal code: ZIP code

Burleith is a neighborhood in Washington, D.C.’s Northwest quadrant. It is bordered by 35th Street NW to the east, Reservoir Road NW and the historic Georgetown district to the south, Whitehaven Park to the north, and Glover-Archbold Park to the west. The neighborhood is home to the Duke Ellington School of the Arts and the Washington International School (primary campus).

== History ==
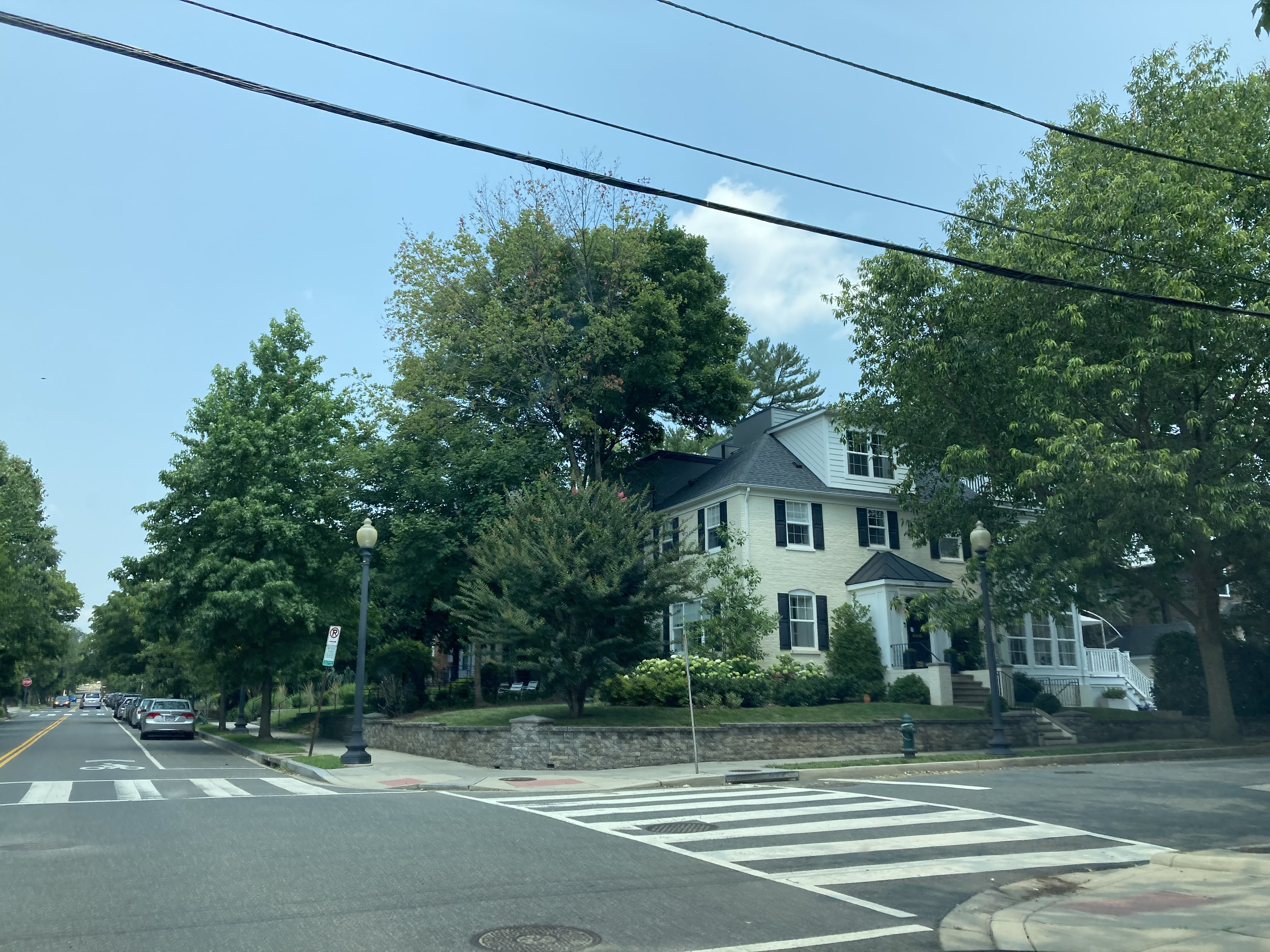
Intersection of 37th and S st. NW, July 2021, in Burleith

The history of Burleith can be traced back to 1886, when the Huidekoper family came into ownership of the Burleith tract of land. During their tenure as residents, they built a few buildings, but kept most of the land as woods and fields. In 1922 the Huidekopers sold the land to Shannon and Luchs, Inc. Instead of keeping the land in its natural state like the previous owners, Shannon and Luchs decided to hire an architect to develop the area. The architect designed homes with moderate prices between $8,950-$13,500 that were targeted for middle class residents with "moderate income, but above average taste".

== Burleith Citizens Association ==
In 1925 the Burleith Citizens Association was developed to deal with civic and social issues concerning the neighborhood. Issues have included parking, noise control, traffic lights, and the relationship with neighboring Georgetown University. The Association also plans social activities, such as picnics and children events. Burleith is in Ward 2 and belongs to ANC 2E along with Georgetown and Hillandale.

== Hillandale ==
To the west of Burleith is a 24-hour gated community called Hillandale; some consider this a separate neighborhood but it is technically part of Burleith. Residents of Hillandale have included U.S. Senators Joseph Lieberman (I-Connecticut) and Ted Stevens (R-Alaska), former NFL Commissioner Paul Tagliabue and Georgetown University President John J. DeGioia. Prior to 1979, Hillandale was an estate owned by John Dustin Archbold's family.
