= Charles C. Glover =

American banker and philanthropist (1846–1936)

Charles Carroll Glover
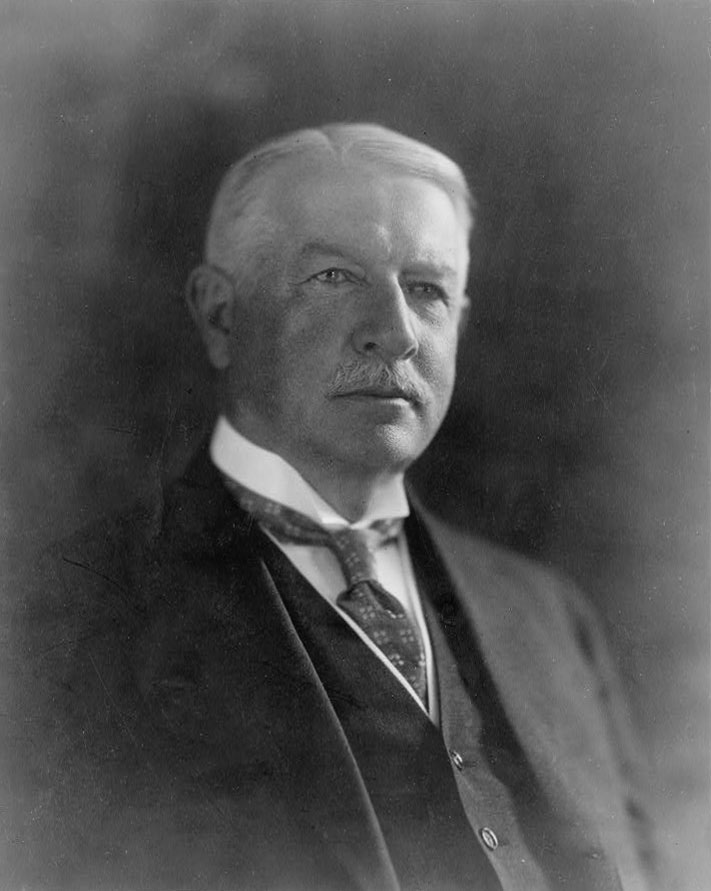
- Born: November 24, 1846; Macon County, North Carolina, US
- Died: February 25, 1936 (aged 89)
- Resting place: Oak Hill Cemetery; Washington, D.C., U.S.
- Education: Rittenhouse Academy
- Occupations: Banker; philanthropist
- Spouse: Annie Cunningham Poor (m. 1878)
- Children: 2, including Charles Jr.
- Relatives: Charles Carroll Glover (grandfather); Jane Cocking Glover (grandmother)

Charles Carroll Glover (November 24, 1846 – February 25, 1936) was an American banker and philanthropist who made major contributions to the modern landscape of Washington, D.C. in the late 19th and early 20th centuries. He was President of Riggs Bank, an effective advocate of urban beautification in Washington under the influence of the City Beautiful movement, and a generous donor of land and money for Washington's parks and monuments.

Glover played a critical role in the creation of Rock Creek Park, the National Zoo, the National Cathedral, Potomac Park, and Glover-Archbold Park. National Park Service historian Cornelius W. Heine, in a 1952 study of Glover's contributions, described him as "both a businessman and a poet." In his account, the parks that Glover directly helped to create in the District of Columbia together represented some 3,200 acres, nearly half the total surface of the National Capital Parks.

== Early life ==
Glover was born in Macon County, North Carolina, the son of Richard Leonidas Glover and Caroline Piercy Glover. His paternal grandparents were English-born socialite and poet Jane Cocking Glover and Charles Carroll Glover, a Maryland attorney.

At age eight, Glover moved to Washington, D.C., where he lived with his grandmother.

== Career ==
In 1866, Glover started working as a teller at Riggs & Company. Seven years later, in the wake of the Panic of 1873, during which many banks failed, Glover was promoted to chief administrative officer of Riggs, at age 27. In 1881, he was named partner and was the bank's effective leader following the death of George Washington Riggs.

In 1896, the bank was converted into a national bank and he became its President. In the early 1900s he oversaw the construction of the new Riggs National Bank headquarters facing the US Treasury Building. He retired from the bank in 1921.

Glover was active in the debate that led to the eventual adoption of the Federal Reserve Act and presented a plan for economic relief to the United States Congress in 1908. He is mentioned by Robert L. Owen together with Frank A. Vanderlip as a source of inspiration for key amendments to the Aldrich–Vreeland Act passed in 1914.

He was also involved in several other business ventures, including as Director of the Washington and Georgetown Railroad, the ancestor of the Washington Metro, and as President of the Washington Stock Exchange.

As a banker to U S. congressmen and U S. presidents, Glover was often a guest at the White House. A story by historian Carlton Fletcher describes Glover's relationship with U.S. president Theodore Roosevelt, whose children played at Glover's country house, despite the men being from being different political parties.

== Public advocacy and philanthropy ==
In 1881, Glover started to promote the reclamation of the Potomac mud flats that extended West and South of the National Mall, and their transformation into a great public park. This idea was met with stubborn opposition from railroad companies which then had facilities on the Mall and wanted to extend them further. The reclamation work started in 1882 under the leadership of Peter Conover Hains, including the creation of the Tidal Basin. But the future use of the land was not settled before early 1897, when Glover obtained the passage of a bill establishing Potomac Park and personally persuaded President Grover Cleveland to sign it on his last full day in office. This paved the way for the McMillan Plan a few years later. The Lincoln Memorial, Jefferson Memorial, Franklin Delano Roosevelt Memorial, and many other iconic monuments of Washington, D.C. owe their existence to the creation of Potomac Park.

In 1888, Glover became the leading promoter of the creation of Rock Creek Park. The project of protecting the natural area around Rock Creek had emerged a generation earlier, but several bills to materialize it had failed in Congress since a first attempt in 1866. Together with other local civic leaders including newspaper publisher Crosby Stuart Noyes and lawyer Calderon Carlisle, he successfully lobbied for bills that led to the creation of the National Zoo in 1889 and Rock Creek Park in 1890. In 1898, Glover was one of the founding members of the Washington Board of Trade, which quickly became the city's most politically powerful civic organization.

Glover made major contributions to the landscape of Massachusetts Avenue NW. While living at 4300 Massachusetts Avenue, Glover contributed to its development. Glover was also attributed with helping develop Embassy Row. In 1928, when Glover provided a site for the British Legation at 3100 Massachusetts Avenue, it was the birth of what is now known as Embassy Row.

The construction of the National Cathedral was launched under Glover's leadership at a meeting in his house on Lafayette Square in 1891. In 1896, anticipating on the avenue's extension beyond Rock Creek, he built his country house and estate, Westover, south of the present Ward Circle. (Westover was razed and redeveloped in the 1960s.) About a decade later, he moved there permanently and used the avenue for his daily commute downtown. Glover was also a trustee of American University, and was instrumental in its establishment on its current main campus, immediately northwest of Westover. Fittingly, when a new bridge was built in the late 1930s to carry Massachusetts Avenue over Rock Creek, it was dedicated with Glover's name.

In addition to promoting the creation of parkland through his efforts in Congress, Glover also donated land of his own. In 1924 he gave some 80 acres of land which, together with a smaller gift from oil heiress Anne Mills Archbold, daughter of John Dustin Archbold, formed Glover-Archbold Park. He also donated other tracts of land in the Eastern part of the District of Columbia. In the early 1920s, he also secured funding for the design of Arlington Memorial Bridge, which was completed a decade later.

He was Vice-President and Treasurer of the Corcoran Gallery.

== Personal life ==
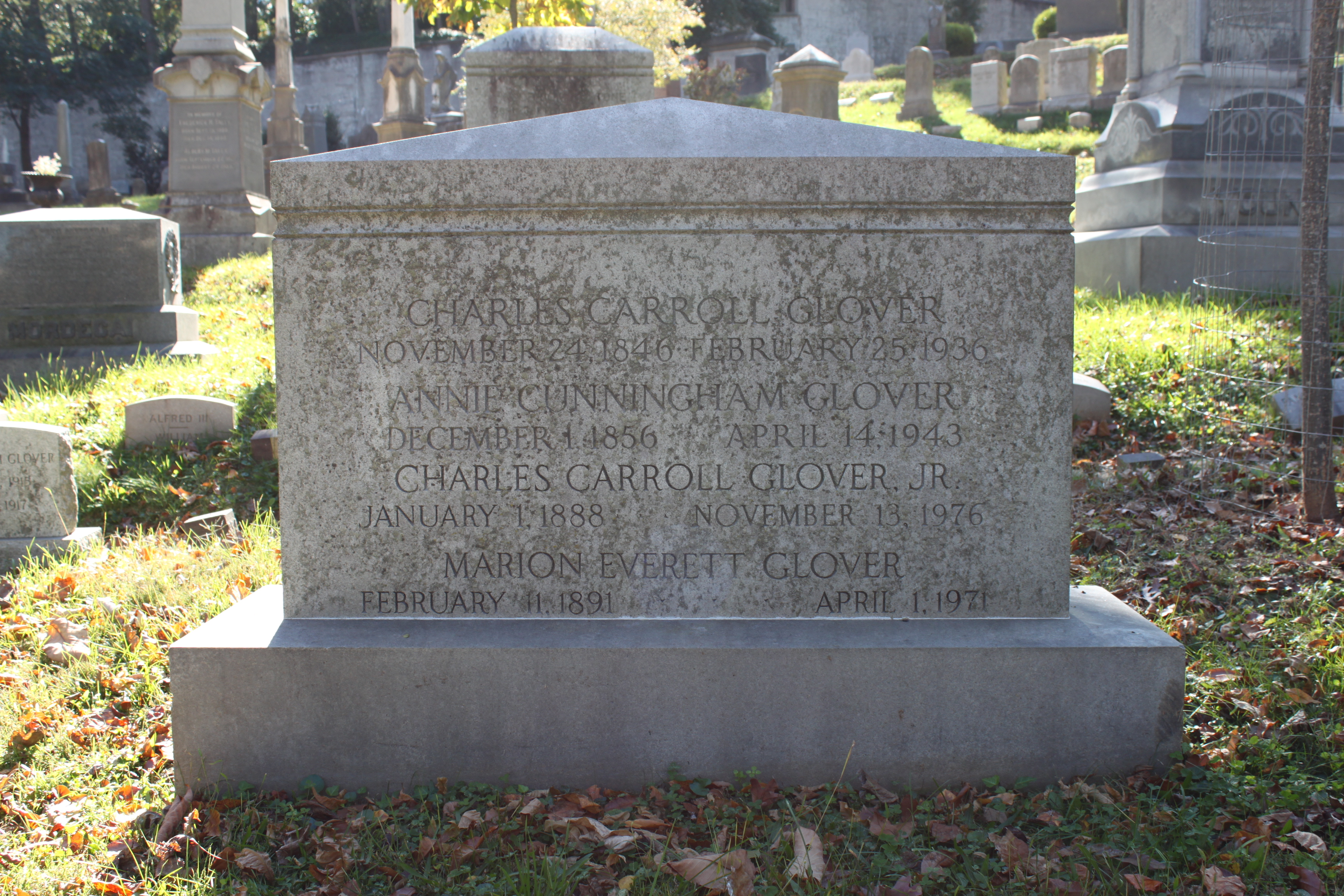
Grave of Glover at Oak Hill Cemetery

Glover married Annie Cunnigham Poor, daughter of Charles Henry Poor, on January 10, 1878. They had two children, Elizabeth Lindsay Glover and Charles Carroll Glover Jr. Elizabeth Glover married René de Marees van Swinderen, Dutch ambassador to the United States.

Glover, his wife, their son, and his wife Marion Everett Wise Glover, were all buried in a family grave in Oak Hill Cemetery.

== Legacy ==
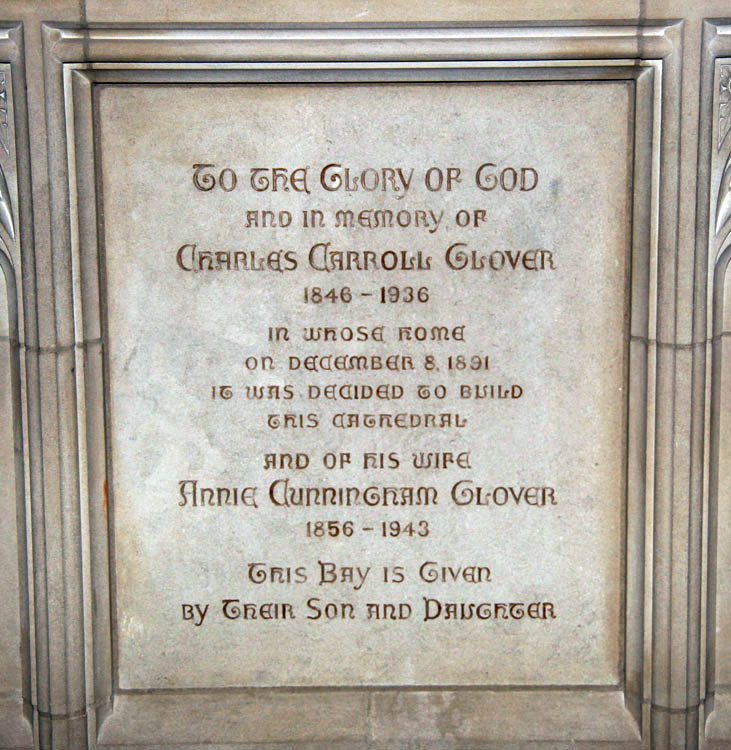
Plaque commemorating Glover in Washington National Cathedral

Glover's name is carried by the Glover-Archbold Park, and by extension, the Glover Park neighborhood; the Charles C. Glover Memorial Bridge; Glover Road in Rock Creek Park; and Glover Drive, a small street south of the site of Westover (see below).

His children dedicated a plaque commemorating his key contribution to the construction of the Washington National Cathedral in the church's south nave.

At American University, where Glover was treasurer of the Board of Trustees from 1891-1922, the gate of the main campus on Massachusetts Avenue bears Glover's name. A student award, the Charles C. Glover Award, was established in 1950 and is awarded annually to a senior that combines citizenship with business leadership in service to the university.

=== Riggs Bank ===
In the 1880s major shareholders of Riggs National Bank were dissatisfied with antitrust rules and federal banking legislation. The legislation made it challenging for commercial banks to manage trust funds. In response, the shareholders established the American Security and Trust Company, which was founded in 1889. Where Riggs was the commercial bank arm, American Security and Trust was the trust arm.

When Glover became president, he was involved American Security and Trust Company's creation. When he built the new Riggs building, he gave one wing to its use. American Security and Trust grew in the coming years, and in 1931, moved to a 10-story building across the street.

=== Westover ===
Also associated with Glover is the memory of his country estate, Westover. It occupied the whole 30-acre area between what are now Massachusetts Avenue NW, Nebraska Avenue NW, New Mexico Avenue NW, Cathedral Avenue NW, and the Glover-Archbold Park. The mansion of the same name, with entrance at 4300 Massachusetts Avenue, was built in 1896. In 1920, Glover gave the southern half of the estate (with entrance at 4200 Massachusetts Ave) to his son, Charles C. Glover Jr, who named it Orchard Hill and built a large Tudor-style house. After Glover's death, Westover was rented during the 1950s as the Irish Embassy. It was sold in 1959 to the National Presbyterian Church, which razed the house in 1967 but decided not to build a church there and relocated farther northeast on Nebraska Avenue NW instead. Orchard Hill in turn was razed in 1977 after the death of Glover's son. A number of residential developments were built on the site of Westover, including: The Towers at 4201 Cathedral Ave NW (1960), The Foxhall (1971), Westover Place (late 1970s), Sutton Towers (1979), Embassy Park (1981), Avalon at Foxhall (1982), and the East Campus of American University (under construction in 2015).

=== Assessment ===
James M. Goode, a historian of Washington, D.C., wrote of him: "Few if any native Washingtonians have left a more positive and lasting contribution to the city than Charles C. Glover Sr., who gave of his wealth (before the days of income-tax deductions for philanthropy) to the future public good." Goode also attributes a key role to Glover in the creation of the National Arboretum by act of Congress in 1927.
