= Hillandale =

Historic house in Washington, D.C., United States

- Hillandale-Main Residence and Gatehouse
- U.S. National Register of Historic Places
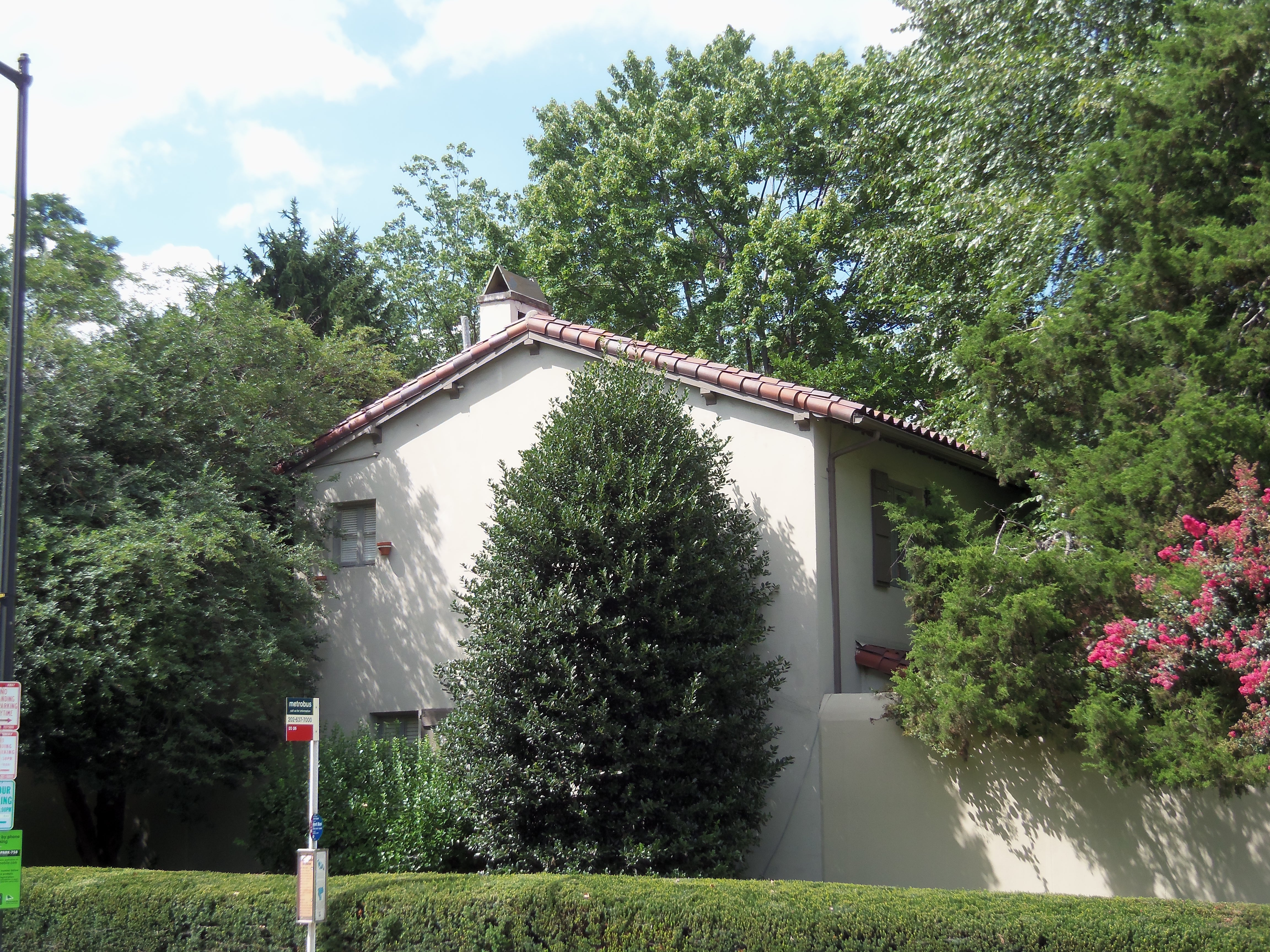
- Gatehouse along Reservoir Road, NW (2011)

- Location within District of Columbia
- Location: 3905 Mansion Court, NW and 3905 Reservoir Road, NW; Washington, D.C.
- Coordinates: 38°54′55″N 77°4′43″W
- Built: 1922–1925
- Architect: Josephine Wright Chapman
- Architectural style: Italian Villa
- NRHP reference No.: 94001595
- Added to NRHP: January 31, 1995

The Hillandale estate comprises a pair of historic structures located in the Burleith neighborhood in Washington, D.C. They have been listed on the National Register of Historic Places since 1995.

== History ==
The estate was originally the home of heiress Anne Mills Archbold, a daughter of Standard Oil executive John D. Archbold, who was a prominent Washington socialite. She donated much of the land that became Glover-Archbold Park. The buildings are the only known Washington works of Boston architect Josephine Wright Chapman. They were built from 1922 to 1925 in the Italian Villa style. The 42.1-acre (17.0 ha) site included the gatehouse and wall that was along Reservoir Road, NW with the main residence near the top of a hill. The building exteriors feature stucco facades, terra cotta tile roofs, balconies and loggias. The interior of the main residence includes a frescoed vestibule and music room with a vaulted ceiling. In the late 1970s and the early 1980s the estate was subdivided and 28 single family residences and 238 townhouses were built in a gated community. The main residence was converted into two single-family dwellings
