= Jane Cocking Glover =

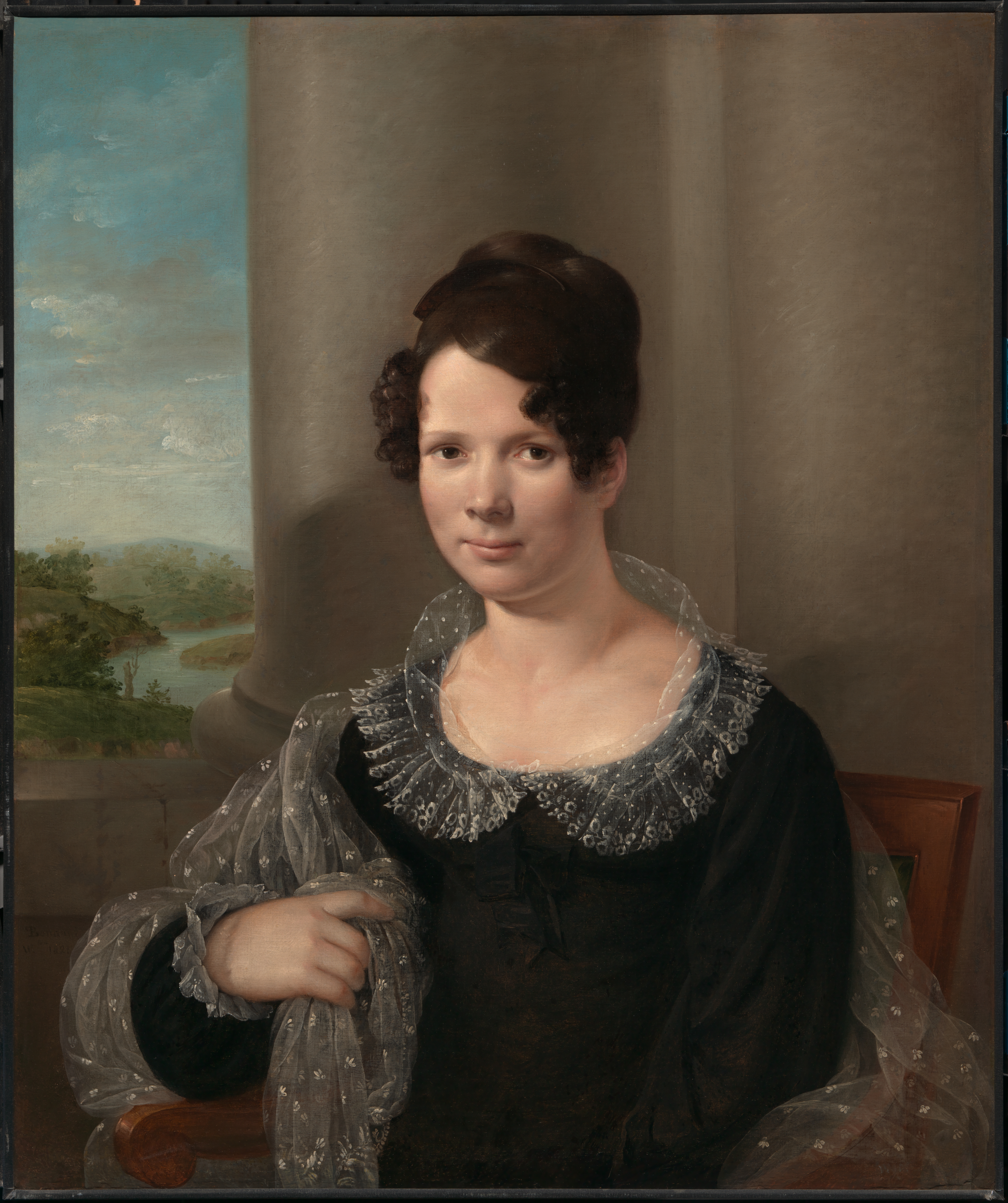
- Portrait by Pietro Bonanni
- Born: June 14, 1789; Doddington, Lincolnshire, England
- Died: September 15, 1876 (aged 87); Washington, D.C., U.S.
- Resting place: Oak Hill Cemetery; Washington, D.C., U.S.
- Occupations: Socialite; poet
- Spouse: Charles Carroll Glover (m. 1814)
- Children: 3
- Relatives: Charles C. Glover (grandson)

Jane Cocking Glover (June 14, 1789 – September 15, 1876) was an English-born American socialite who was also, at one time, active as a poet.

== Life ==
Glover was born Jane Cocking to William (1760–1820) and Ann (née Hind, formerly Worsley, 1750–1834) Cocking at Doddington, Lincolnshire. The family, which included her sister Ann (sometimes Anne), and three older half-siblings from their mother’s first marriage, lived at Holbeach Marsh. Just before turning 16, Jane began submitting poetry to The Lady's Magazine; six of her contributions, a pair of acrostics and an elegy among them, appeared in the poetry section of that April's magazine. Later issues contain such pieces as a response to a poem by James Murray Lacey, cataloguing the many loves of his life; other poems appeared in the October edition. At some point during 1805 the Cocking sisters began preparations to move to the United States; in June the Magazine printed two poems by "Belinda" wishing them well on the trip. That same month, Jane wrote a pair of farewell poems from London; on September 12, her sister married William Blanchard, and a few weeks later the sisters, their parents, and Blanchard left for the United States. Upon arrival they settled in Washington, D.C.

Cocking married, on August 19, 1813, at Christ Church, Washington Parish, Charles Carroll Glover, a prominent Maryland attorney. With him she had three children; the 1820 census records that they also owned two slaves, and an 1820 document notes the manumission of a 41-year-old female slave, Fanny, "she being able to obtain a living for herself".

Glover died in 1827, and was interred in the family plot at Washington's Oak Hill Cemetery. Whether or not she continued her literary career after emigration is unknown.

Sources differ on the question of the names and longevity of her children. Becoming Jane specifies Glover would go on to outlive all three of her children - a daughter, Adeline, who died at 9 months, and sons William, died at 21, and Richard, died at 29. Charles C. Glover, Jr., a great-grandson of the couple, specifies "a daughter, Matilda, the wife of Robert Harper Williamson, also lived to be eighty-seven, and another daughter, Mary Jane, wife of Abraham Ferree Shriver, lived to the age of ninety-four, dying of influenza in the war epidemic of 1918. The only son of Charles and Jane Glover was Richard Leonidas, who married Caroline Percy of North Carolina".

A portrait of Glover by Pietro Bonanni was painted in 1821, and later became part of the collection of the Corcoran Gallery of Art. At that museum's dissolution in 2014 the painting was accessioned by the National Portrait Gallery of the Smithsonian Institution, where it currently resides. Pierre Charles L'Enfant, a family friend, made a number of sketches of the Glover family; only two of these, both of Charles Glover, survive.
