= Foundry United Methodist Church =

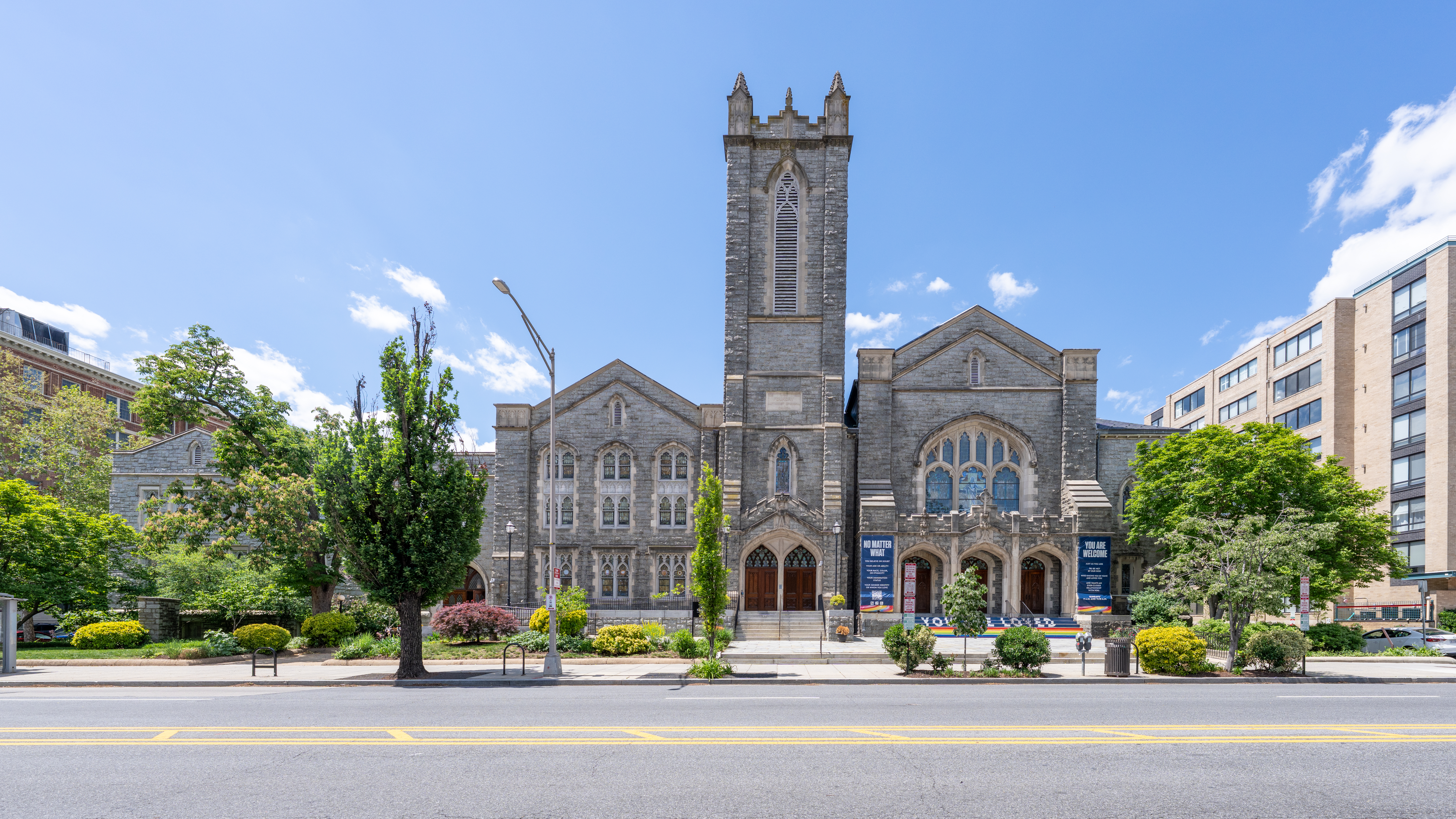
- Front View (2026)
- Foundry United Methodist Church
- 38.910028°N 77.036804°W
- Location: 1500 16th St. NW; Washington, D.C.
- Country: United States
- Denomination: United Methodist Church
- Previous denomination: Methodist Episcopal Church
- Website: www.foundryumc.com

History
- Founded: 1814
- Founder(s): Henry Foxall, Francis Asbury
- Dedicated: April 10, 1904

Architecture
- Functional status: Active
- Architect: Appleton P. Clark Jr.
- Architectural type: Church
- Style: Gothic Revival
- Completed: 1904

Administration
- Division: Baltimore-Washington Conference

Clergy
- Bishop: Rev. LaTrelle Easterling

Foundry United Methodist Church is a historic congregation of the United Methodist Church, located on 16th Street NW, Washington, D.C., and founded in 1814.

== History ==
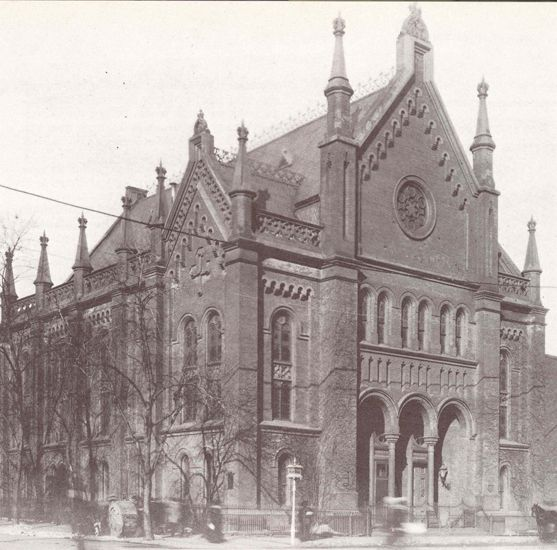
Foundry Church built in 1866

Henry Foxall, the prominent owner of the Columbia Foundry (besides the church, also namesake of the Foundry Branch), contributed the land and funds for the construction of the first church in 1814. By tradition, he made the contribution in gratitude for divine intervention after a thunderstorm prevented British soldiers from destroying the foundry during the Burning of Washington. Foxall, who later served as mayor of Georgetown, was an associate of Francis Asbury, the founder of American Methodism, and became a lay preacher himself.

A simple brick church was constructed at 14th and G Streets, Northwest, and Stephen G. Roszel became its first preacher, in 1815. The name "Foundry Chapel" was first used in 1816, and the community became an independent charge in 1817.

President Abraham Lincoln attended a January 18, 1863 service at Foundry, where visiting Bishop Matthew Simpson, raising funds for missionary work, proposed that Lincoln be made a life director of the Methodist Missionary Society. His successor Andrew Johnson is also known to have attended. In 1877, President Rutherford B. Hayes became a member of the congregation, and he and his wife Lucy attended services regularly for the next four years. Lucy Webb Hayes was a devout Methodist and known for her support of the temperance movement, and later nicknamed "Lemonade Lucy" as she did not serve alcohol at White House events.

In June 1872, the church purchased land at 15th and R Streets NW, which was developed into the Fifteenth Street Methodist Church. Foundry and the Fifteenth Street church merged in 1903. Around this time, the church leaders sought to build a bigger church, and acquired the current parcel on 16th Street NW. The new church opened for worship on February 28, 1904, and was dedicated on April 10 of that year.

In 1924, Frederick Brown Harris was appointed pastor, a position he would have for more than 30 years, during which time he also served as the Chaplain of the Senate, and became the longest-serving holder of that title.

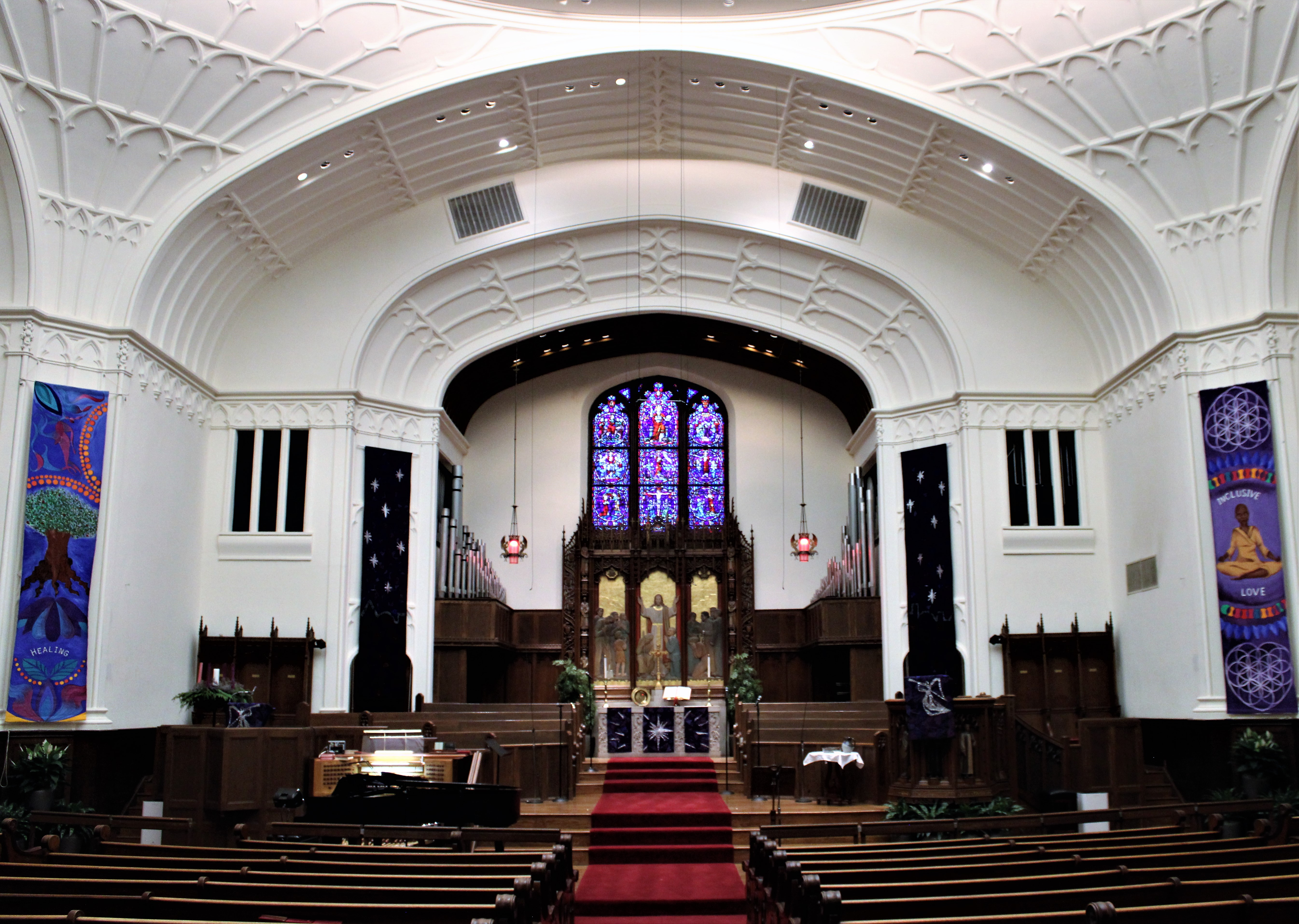
Sanctuary

Attendance reached an all-time high during World War II. Early in the American involvement in the war, President Franklin D. Roosevelt and U.K. Prime Minister Winston Churchill attended a special interfaith service at Foundry on December 25, 1941.

J. Philip Wogaman, previously of Wesley Theological Seminary, became senior minister in 1992. In 1993, Foundry welcomed President Bill Clinton and Hillary Clinton as members; the Clintons would attend services there about half the weekends they were in Washington. On June 7, 1995, the church voted to become a "Reconciling Ministry" for LGBTQIA+ members, an effort which continued under Wogaman's successor, Dean Snyder. The church voted overwhelmingly in 2010 to allow same-sex marriages, placing it in conflict with the larger United Methodist Church.

In 2014, Ginger E. Gaines-Cirelli became the first woman to serve as senior pastor.

== Beliefs ==
=== Marriage ===
The church has an inclusive vision and celebrates both opposite-sex marriages and same-sex marriages.

== Music ==
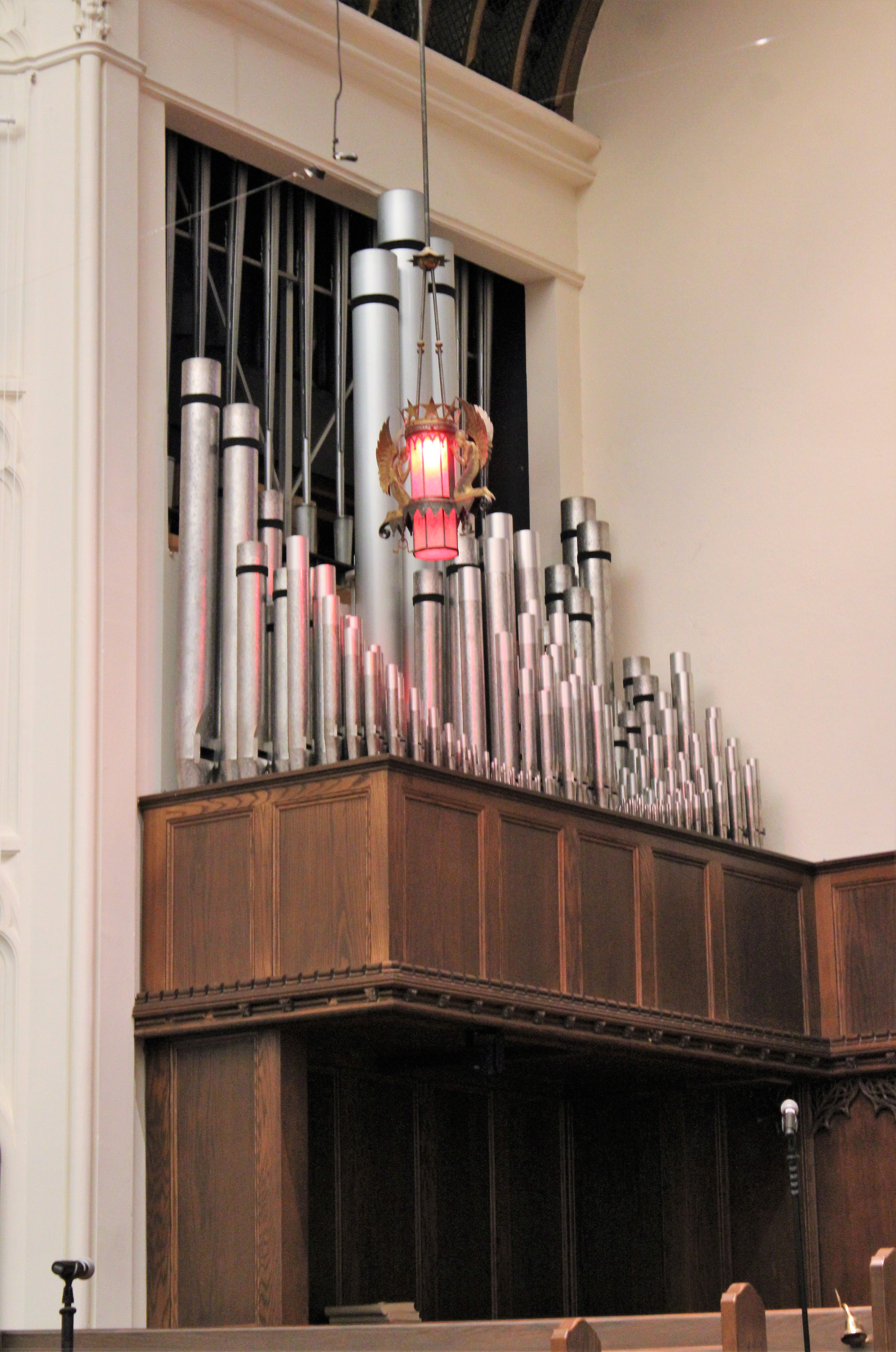
Some of the pipes of the pipe organ.

Foundry is known for its strong music program, which includes a children's choir, contemporary choir, and the 55-voice Foundry Choir. The Foundry Choir was selected to lead the opening communion service of the 1984 UMC General Conference, marking the bicentennial of Methodism in America.

The church organ is a Casavant of 3,364 pipes and 60 ranks installed as part of the church's 1984 renovation. A committee led by organist Eileen Guenther supervised its design and installation, choosing spots and voicing to reflect a focus on Classical and Romantic French literature. Guenther gave its first performance in February 1985.

== See also ==
- Sixteenth Street Historic District
