= Massachusetts Avenue Bridge =

The Massachusetts Avenue Bridge could mean

- Charles C. Glover Memorial Bridge, in Northwest Washington, D.C.
- Harvard Bridge, between Cambridge and Back Bay, Boston in Massachusetts, also known as the MIT or Smoot Bridge
