= Charles Carroll Glover Jr. =

American banker and philanthropist

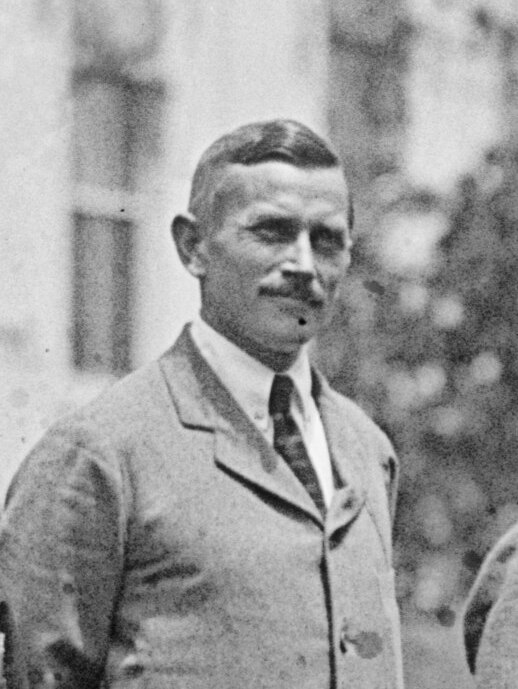
- Glover in 1925
- Born: January 1, 1888; Washington, D.C.
- Died: November 13, 1976 (aged 88)

Charles Carroll Glover Jr. (January 1, 1888 – November 13, 1976) was an American banker and philanthropist in Washington D.C. He was the son of former Riggs Bank President Charles Carroll Glover and Annie Cunningham Glover. He was related to Charles Henry Poor through his mother's side.

== Early life and career ==
Glover was born on January 1, 1888, in Washington, D.C. He received a Bachelor of Arts from Yale University in 1910, and a Master of Arts in 1915. He then received a Bachelor of Laws from George Washington University in 1912, and a Doctor of Laws in 1952. At Yale, he was a member of Alpha Delta Phi.

Glover then worked as a partner at Glover & Father, an investment banking firm, from 1915 until 1932. In 1916, he became director of the Riggs National Bank, where his father previously served as President. In 1927, he was appointed as president of the Washington Stock Exchange.

== Public advocacy and philanthropy ==
He served as president of the Corcoran Gallery of Art, the Metropolitan Club and the Yale Club of Washington, and an honorary trustee of George Washington University and the Washington National Cathedral. Glover was a District of Columbia representative on Unemployment Relief Commission from 1931-1932, and a member of the Board of Public Welfare. He also served as vice chairman of the Yale Alumni Advisory Board.

== Personal life ==
Glover was married to Marion Everett Wise Glover. They had a son, Charles C. Glover III, and a daughter, Nancy E. Symington.
