= Charles Poor =

Charles Poor may refer to:

- Charles Henry Poor (1808–1882), United States Navy admiral
- Charles Lane Poor (1866–1951), American astronomy professor
