= Henrietta McKenney =

American painter

Henrietta Foxall McKenney (November 11, 1825 – February 2, 1887) was an American painter.

McKenney was born in Georgetown, Washington, D.C., the daughter of Samuel and Mary Ann Foxall McKenney; her grandfather, Henry Foxall, was a noted industrialist and lay Methodist preacher. In youth she was a talented artist, painting at fifteen a View of Mount Vernon and at sixteen a view of Harper's Ferry. In 1845 she produced a harbor scene; two foreign views are known as well. She married Dr. Charles Hartwell Cragin, Sr., who served for a time as Police Commissioner of the District of Columbia, and died in Washington, where she is buried in Oak Hill Cemetery.

McKenney's view of Harper's Ferry was included in the inaugural exhibition of the National Museum of Women in the Arts, American Women Artists 1830–1930, in 1987.
