= Pietro Bonanni =

Italian painter (1789–1821)

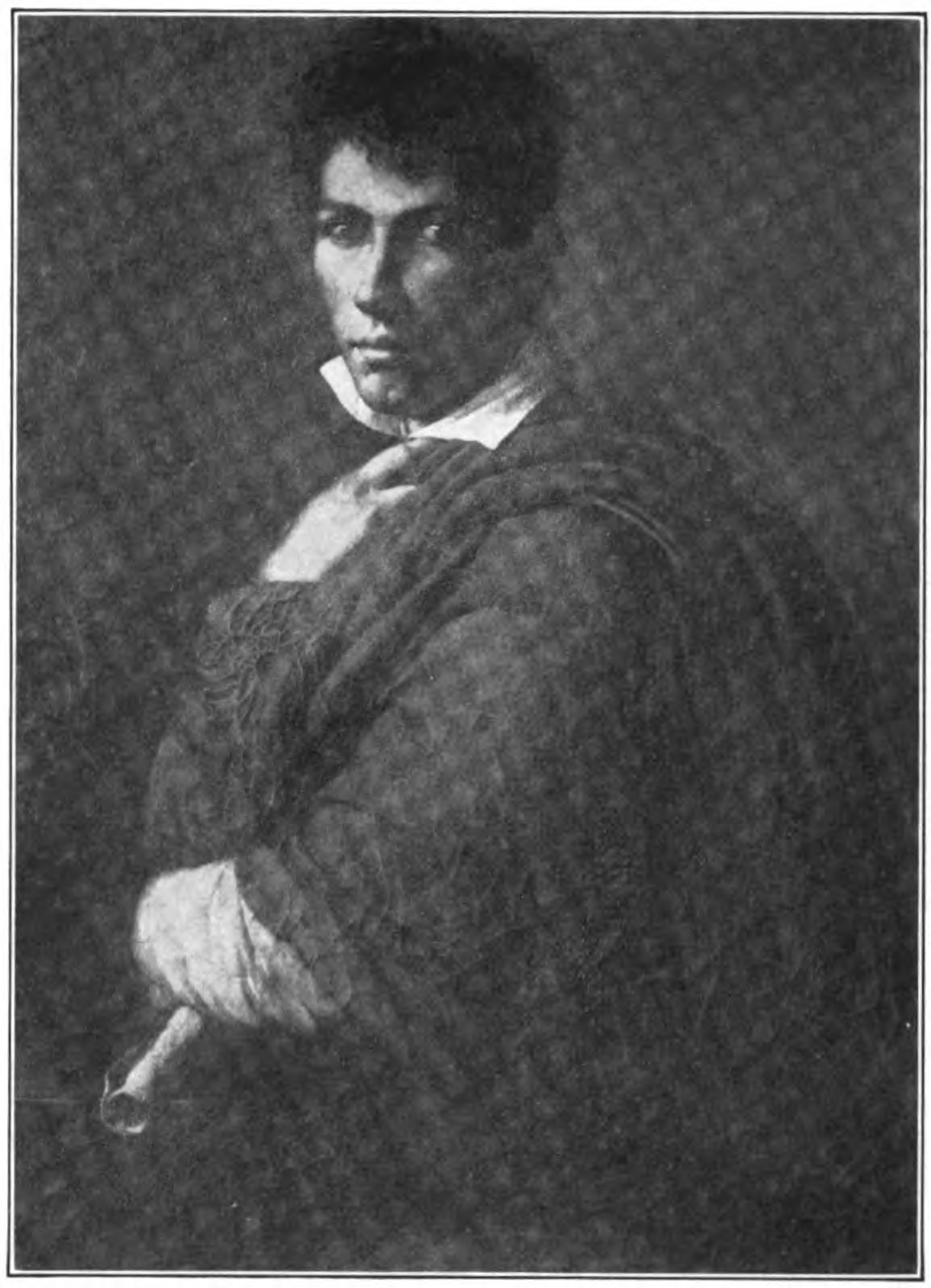
Self-portrait by Bonanni, now destroyed. Formerly in the collection of the United States Capitol

Pietro Bonanni (November 26, 1789 – June 15, 1821) was an Italian-born painter active in the United States.

== Life and career ==
Bonanni was a native of Carrara, and began his studies in the art academy of that city under Jean-Baptiste Frédéric Desmarais. His painting of The Death of Count Ugolino received an award from the same academy in 1809. From 1812 until 1814 he passed his time in Paris studying with Jacques-Louis David; he then returned to his native city and to Rome before traveling to Washington, D.C. sometime around 1816. Two years after his arrival he opened a drawing and painting academy in the home of sculptor Giovanni Andrei, at the same time finding work as a decorative painter during the construction of the United States Capitol. There his best-regarded contribution was the ceiling of the former chamber of the House of Representatives, today the National Statuary Hall, which he painted in mock relief to emulate the ceiling of the Pantheon. This was removed in 1901, but was replaced with a new ceiling reproducing the effect of the original. Bonanni showed work at the Pennsylvania Academy of the Fine Arts in 1819. He died in Washington; the auction house of Peter Mauro offered paintings and prints from his estate for sale soon thereafter.

== Work ==
Andrew Consentino has said of Bonanni that he was "the finest painter of the community at the time", and suggests that he "might have engendered a local tradition had he not died so prematurely". Comparatively little is known of his career in Washington, but in 1818 he raffled off a painting of James Monroe. A portrait of Jane Cocking Glover, painted in the year of his death, was formerly owned by the Corcoran Gallery of Art; at that institution's dissolution it passed into the collection of the National Portrait Gallery. The James Monroe Museum in Fredericksburg, Virginia, owns a painting of Monroe's Return to Washington, 1817, of uncertain date. An 1820 portrait of Mary Sumner Blount currently hangs in Mordecai House in Raleigh, North Carolina. An 1818 portrait of Carlo Franzoni is held in the collection of the United States Capitol; a self-portrait formerly in the same collection was destroyed in a fire in the Capitol's art restoration room in 1930.
