= J. Philip Wogaman =

J. Philip Wogaman is former Senior Minister at Foundry United Methodist Church in Washington, D.C. (1992–2002), and former Professor of Christian Ethics at Wesley Theological Seminary Washington, D.C. (1966–92), serving as dean of that institution from 1972–83.

Wogaman was born the second son of a Methodist minister in Toledo, Ohio, and lived in several Ohio communities as his father moved from parish to parish, until his father's respiratory condition forced the family's move to southern Arizona. He was a professor of Bible and social ethics at University of the Pacific from 1961–66, where he had previously earned his B.A. in 1954. He entered Boston University (M.Div., 1957, Ph.D., 1960) for graduate study in the semester following the graduation of Dr. Martin Luther King from the same institution.

Outside of theological circles, Wogaman is perhaps best known as one of the religious leaders who counseled President Bill Clinton, who attended Foundry Church during his terms as U.S. president. Wogaman is a past president of the Society of Christian Ethics of the United States and Canada (1976–77) and the American Theological Society (2004–05), and a member of the founding board of the Interfaith Alliance. A United Methodist Minister (ordained in 1957), he was a delegate to that denomination's General Conference four times. After retirement from Foundry Church in 2002, Wogaman served as Interim President of Iliff School of Theology, Denver, Colorado (2004–06) and as interim Senior Pastor of St. Luke United Methodist Church, Omaha, Nebraska (2008–09).

== Partial bibliography ==
- Protestant Faith and Religious Liberty (1967)
- Guaranteed Annual Income: The Moral Issues (1968)
- A Christian Method of Moral Judgement (1977)
- Economics and Ethics (1986)
- Christian Perspectives on Politics (1988)
- Making Moral Decisions (1990)
- Christian Ethics: A Historical Introduction (1993)
- Speaking the Truth in Love: Prophetic Preaching to a Broken World< (1998)
- From the Eye of the Storm: A Pastor to the President Speaks Out (1998), a memoir
- An Unexpected Journey: Reflections on Pastoral Ministry (2004).
- Moral Dilemmas: An Introduction to Christian Ethics (2009).
- What Christianity Can Learn from Other Religions (2014).
