= Jean-Baptiste Frédéric Desmarais =

French painter

Jean-Baptiste Frédéric Desmarais (1756–1813) was a French painter of the Neoclassical period, who after 1786 was active in Italy, rising to be a professor of the Academies of Fine Arts of Lucca and Massa Carrara.

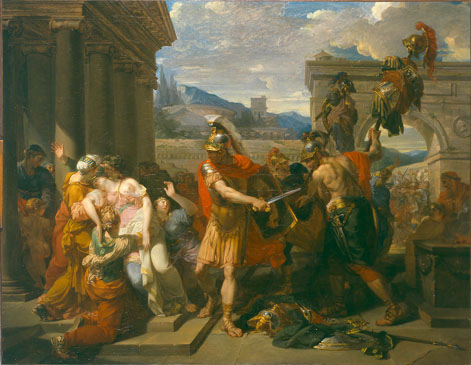
Horace slays his sister Camille

== Biography ==
He was born in Paris and died in Carrara. Jean-Baptiste studied at the Royal academy of Fine Arts in Paris in 1781, and was awarded the prestigious Prix de Rome in 1785, with his painting with a subject from early Roman History:Horace slays his sister Camille. He spent the years 1786 to 1790 in Rome. He was named professor at the Academy of Fine Arts of Florence in 1793. He appears not to have returned to France with the turmoil of the Revolution. During the Napoleonic occupation of Northern Italy, he was recruited by Princess Elisa Baciocchi to be professor of painting at the Academy of Fine Arts in Lucca in 1805, replacing Stefano Tofanelli, and he became Vice-President of the Academy of Design and Sculpture in Carrara in 1806, where he would recruit the famous sculptor Pietro Tenerani. Among his many pupils was Pietro Bonanni.
