= Mary Sumner Blount =

American philanthropist (1777–1822)

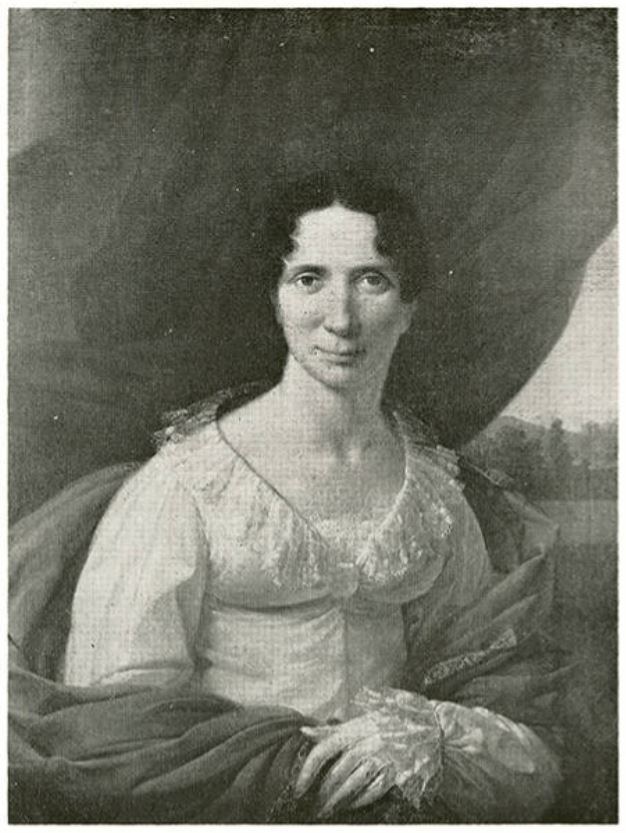
Portrait by Pietro Bonanni

Mary Sumner Blount, in earlier years known as Jackie (sometimes Jacky) (1777-1822) was an American philanthropist.

== Life ==
Born in Warren County, North Carolina, Blount was the daughter of Jethro Sumner and his wife, the former widow Heiss. Through her father she was descended from William Sumner, who had emigrated to the vicinity of Suffolk, Virginia from England around 1690. She had one brother, Thomas Edward. In 1796 Mary married Thomas Blount, becoming his second wife. At the time he represented North Carolina in the United States House of Representatives, a position which he occupied for the next sixteen years until his death, in office, in Washington, D.C. The couple had no children. Mary herself died suddenly while visiting a friend in Tarboro. She was buried in that town, in the Calvary churchyard. Legend says that her original grave marker was destroyed by lightning; it was replaced by one provided by the congregation of Christ Episcopal Church in Raleigh.

== Will ==
At her death, Mary Blount left a substantial amount of money, much of which was divided among her relatives and friends, her legatees numbering some sixty in total. Her will also contained a bequest for the "building of a Protestant Episcopal Church in the City of Raleigh", to be paid for by "a large sum of money now due to me by virtue of the will of my late husband"; the amount of this sum is believed to have been between $10,000 and $15,000. The agents for the bequest were to be Duncan Cameron and the Reverend William Hooper. The church lot was purchased in 1826, and a frame church building was erected; this was later replaced with the current building. An 1820 portrait of Mrs. Blount by Pietro Bonanni was bequeathed by her to Moses Mordecai, and was to be bequeathed in turn by his granddaughter to the congregation of Christ Church; she later changed her mind, however, and the painting is today in the possession of Raleigh's Mordecai House.

Blount's will also set aside money to erect a grave marker for her father, and specified the design of the stone. Initially buried in Warren County, in 1891 he was reinterred on the battleground at Guilford Courthouse; the monument was reerected over his grave at this time.
