= Yale Club (disambiguation) =

The Yale Club of New York City is a private club restricted to alumni and faculty of Yale University.

Yale Club may also refer to:

- Yale Club of Hartford
- Yale Glee Club
- Yale Corinthian Yacht Club
