= Foundry Branch =

Coordinates: 38.905112°N 77.079145°W

Location
- Country: United States
- Federal district: District of Columbia

Physical characteristics
- Mouth
  - location: Potomac River
  - elevation: 0 feet (0 m)

Foundry Branch is a tributary stream of the Potomac River in Washington, D.C.

The historic headwaters of the stream were in the Tenleytown area in Northwest Washington. Today, the section of the stream north of Massachusetts Avenue is hydrologically separated from the lower section and runs through a large stormwater pipe under the daylighted portion. The daylight portion of the stream can be seen south of Massachusetts Avenue and in Glover-Archbold Park. The stream continues to the Potomac, which drains to the Chesapeake Bay.

Originally known to settlers as Deep or Mill Creek, the stream eventually was named for the Columbia Foundry, established in Georgetown by Henry Foxall in 1799.

== See also ==
- List of District of Columbia rivers
