= Henry Foxall =

American politician, industrialist and preacher (1758–1823)

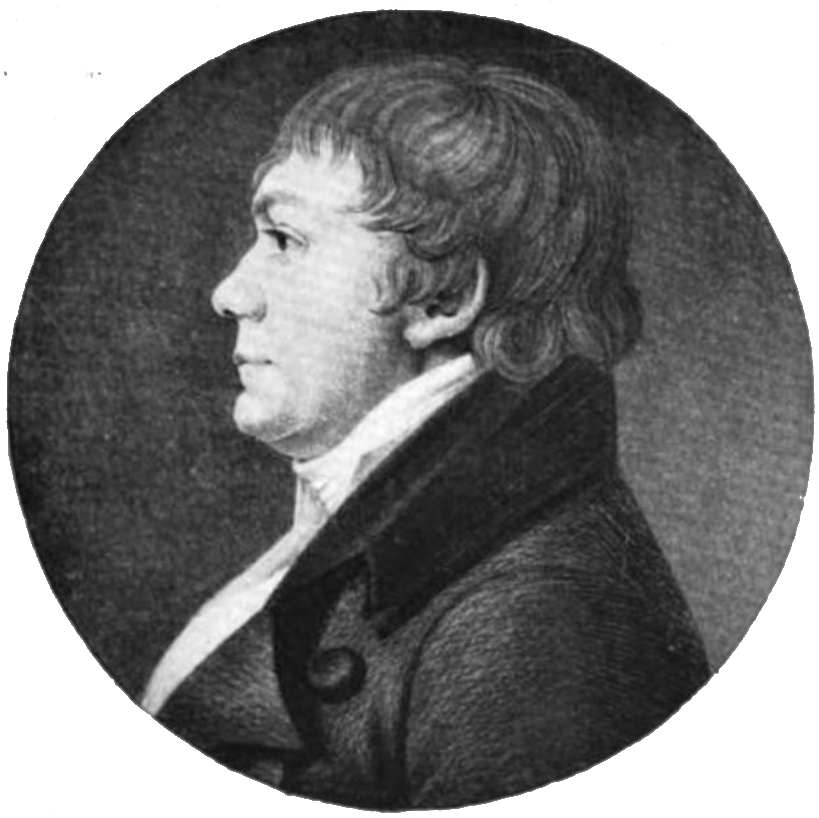

Personal details
- Born: May 24, 1758 South Wales
- Died: December 11, 1823 (aged 65) England
- Spouses: Ann Harward (m. 1780; died 1798) Margaret English Smith (died 1816) Catherine Holland (m. 1816)
- Children: 5
- Relatives: Henrietta McKenney (granddaughter)
- Known for: Mayor of Georgetown, Columbia Foundry, founding the Foundry United Methodist Church

Henry Foxall (May 24, 1758 – December 11, 1823) was an English-born American politician, industrialist and Methodist preacher. He is considered one of the first United States defense contractors because he supplied the U.S. Navy during the Quasi War, First Barbary War and the War of 1812 with cannons and cannonballs from his iron foundries in Philadelphia, Georgetown (then part of Maryland) and Richmond, Virginia. He also served as Mayor of Georgetown and helped found the Foundry United Methodist Church in Washington, D.C.

== Early life ==
Henry Foxall was born on May 24, 1758, in Monmouth Forge in South Wales to Mary (née Hays) and Thomas Foxall. After his birth, the family returned to the British West Midlands. The family became Methodist through their friendship with the Asbury family. Foxall would remain friends with Francis Asbury for the rest of his life. His father was an ironworker who served as foreman at the Old Forge in West Bromwich for a time.

== Career ==
=== Ironworking ===
Foxall learned the iron foundry trade in England and Ireland. He apprenticed at Funtley Forge, near HMNB Portsmouth. He was employed by Henry Cort for seven years and learned proficiency in the use of coke to fire the iron furnace and the puddling and rolling techniques pioneered by Cort. He then went to Ireland, having been recruited by Thomas O'Reilly, in the late 1780s and worked at the Arigna Iron Works in Arigna. By November 1791, Foxall converted to Methodism. Around June 1795, after the Catholic Defenders attacked Arigna, Foxall and his family fled to Annandale and later took the ship Joseph to New York City.

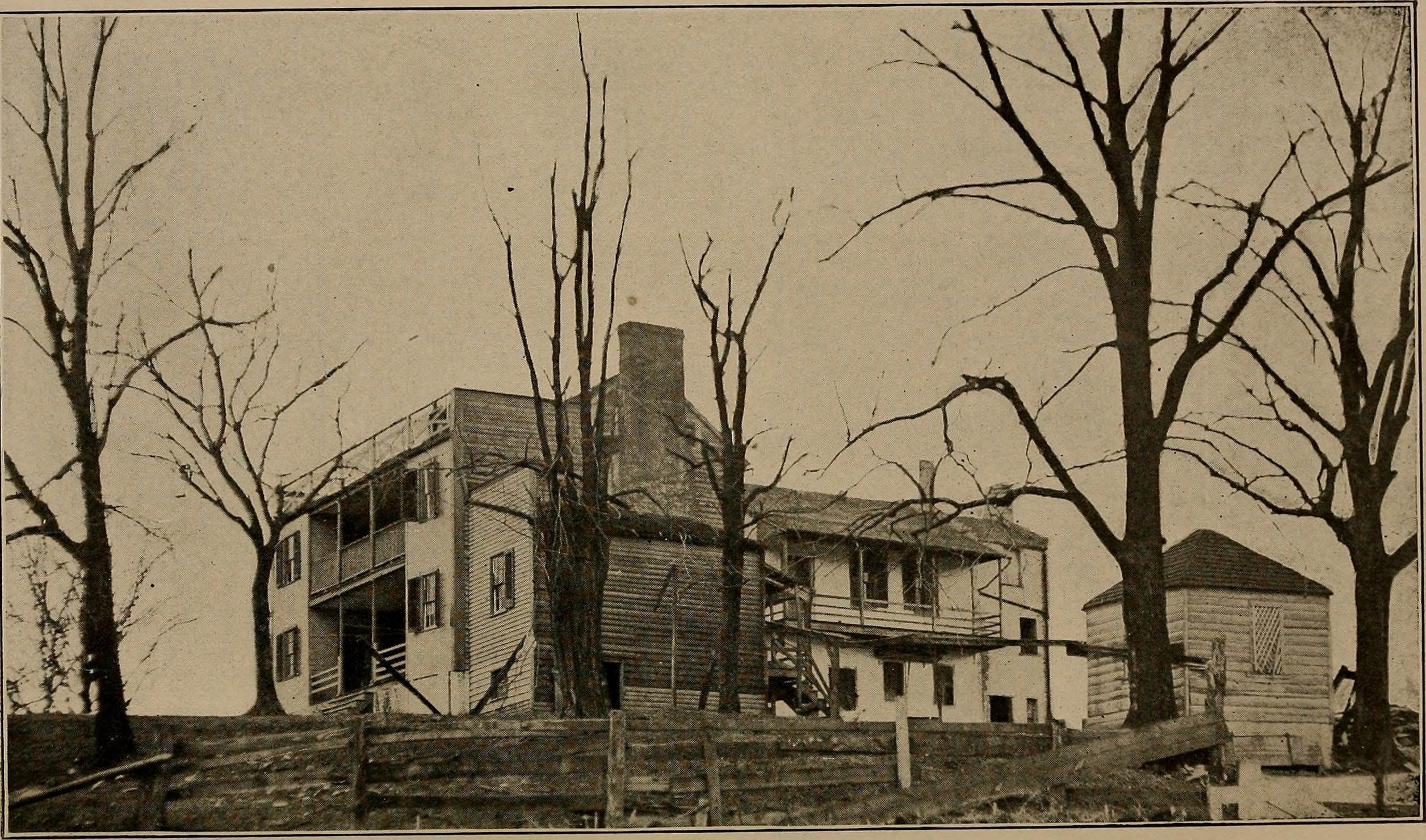
Foxall's Country Home (c. 1908)

By October 1795, they had settled in Philadelphia, Pennsylvania. While in Philadelphia, he set up and purchased the Eagle Iron Works in partnership with Robert Morris. Their partnership dissolved in 1800. While in Philadelphia, he was able to supply the U.S. Navy with cannons and cannonballs during the First Barbary War and the Quasi War. This act makes him considered one of the first United States defense contractor.

In 1800, Foxall moved to Georgetown and built the Columbia Foundry in 1801. He also set up a foundry in Richmond, Virginia in 1809. Both foundries produced cannons for the federal government. It was estimated that during his time leading the Columbia Foundry, approximately 300 heavy guns and 30,000 shots were produced in a year. He supplied armaments during the War of 1812 and his foundry was targeted by British forces, but the attack never happened due to weather and rumors of additional American forces. Foxall's business was also a supplier of cast iron to Thomas Jefferson and the U.S. Capitol building. He retired in 1815 and sold his foundries.

=== Other endeavors ===
Foxall served as Mayor of Georgetown. He also was the director of a bank in Georgetown, trustee of the Georgetown Importing and Exporting Company and the owner of a bakery.

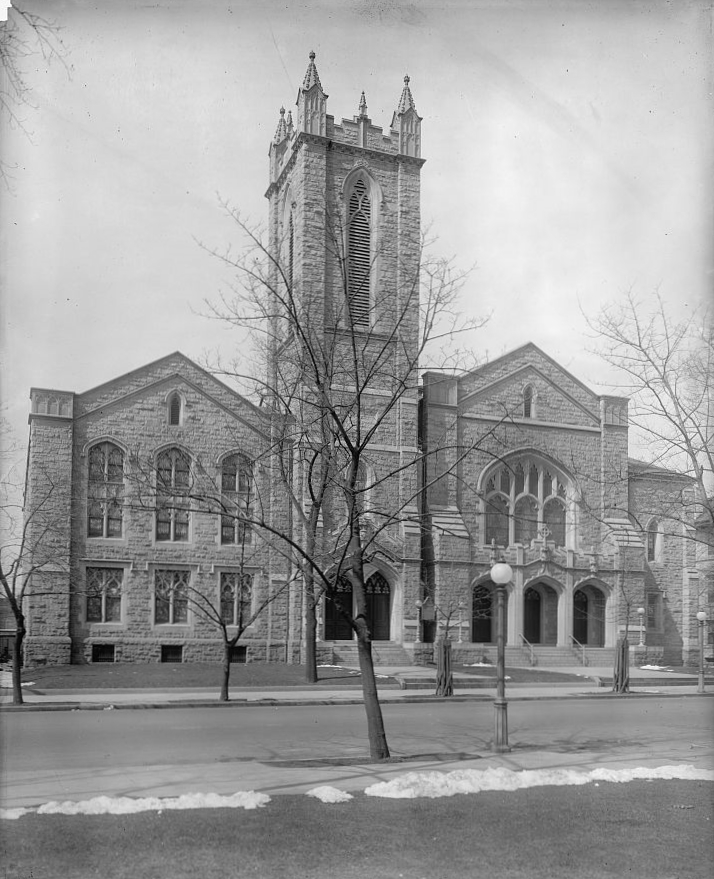
Foundry Church (c. 1910s-1920s)

Foxall was actively involved in the Methodist church. He worked as a lay preacher, but was ordained officially as an elder in 1814. Foxall donated in 1814 to have the Foundry Chapel (later the Foundry United Methodist Church) built. It was the first Methodist congregation organized in the city of Washington west of the Capitol. The church was dedicated on September 10, 1815, and named in commemoration of John Wesley's Foundry Chapel in London.

== Personal life ==
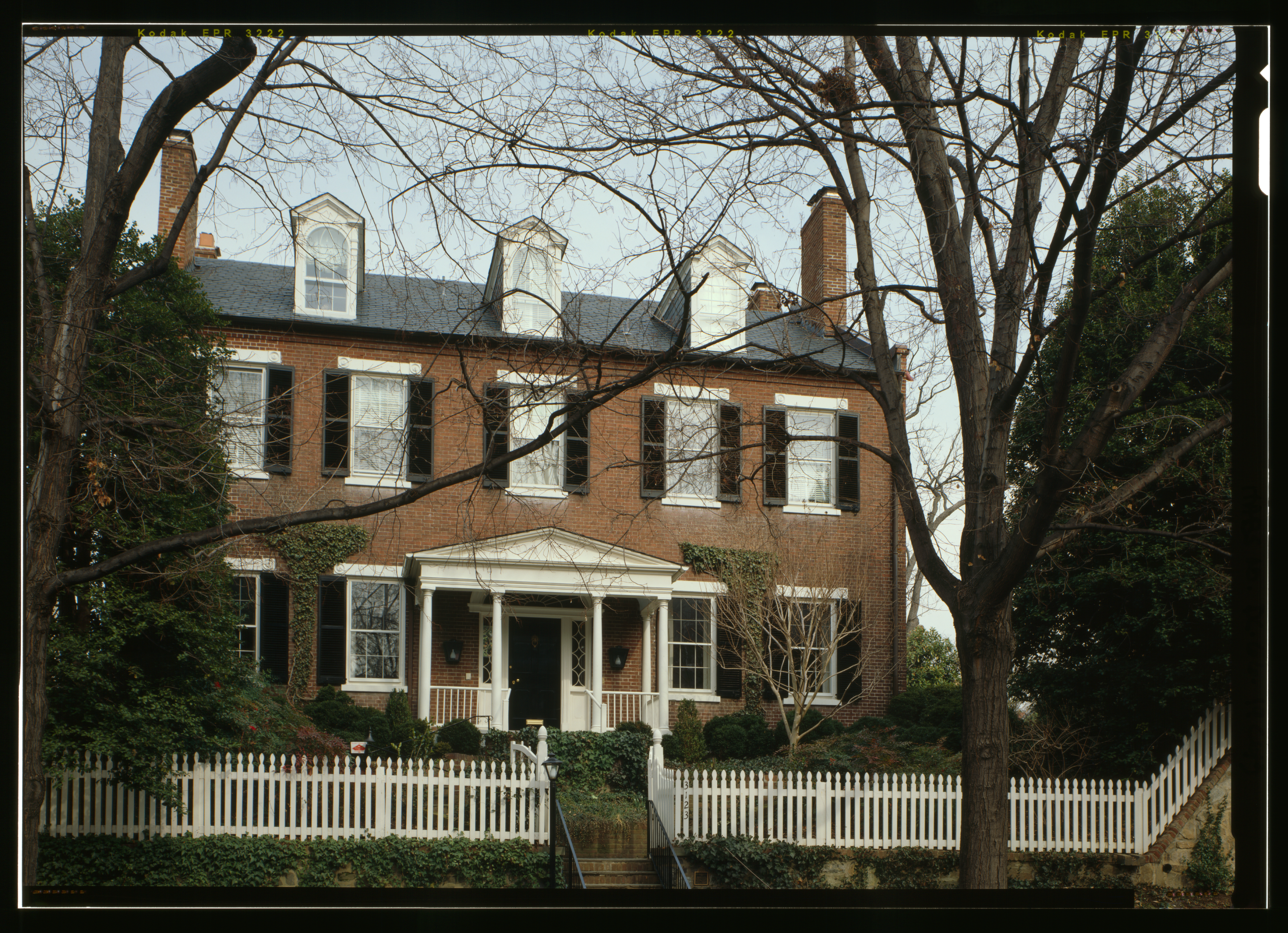
Foxall-McKenney House, 3123 Dumbarton Street, Georgetown (1999)

Foxall married three times. Foxall married Ann Harward of Stourport, Worcestershire in 1780 while in Ireland, and together they had five children, three that died at a young age, John (1786–1809) and Mary Ann (1791–1856). His wife died in the 1798 Philadelphia yellow fever epidemic. He married Margaret English Smith, and she died in 1816. He later married his third wife, Catherine Holland, in November 1816.

Foxall became a naturalized citizen after moving to Georgetown in 1803. Foxall owned a house on 34th Street, the previous residence of General James Lingan. He also owned a country house on Spring Hill in Georgetown. He also built a house for his daughter, Mary McKenney, at 3123 Dumbarton Avenue, later called the Foxall-McKenney House.

== Later life and death ==
After retiring in 1815, he returned to England on two occasions, once in 1815 and another time in 1823. On December 11, 1823, he died while visiting England.

== Legacy ==
The Foxhall Village neighborhood in Washington, D.C. is named after Foxall.
