= Charles C. Glover Memorial Bridge =

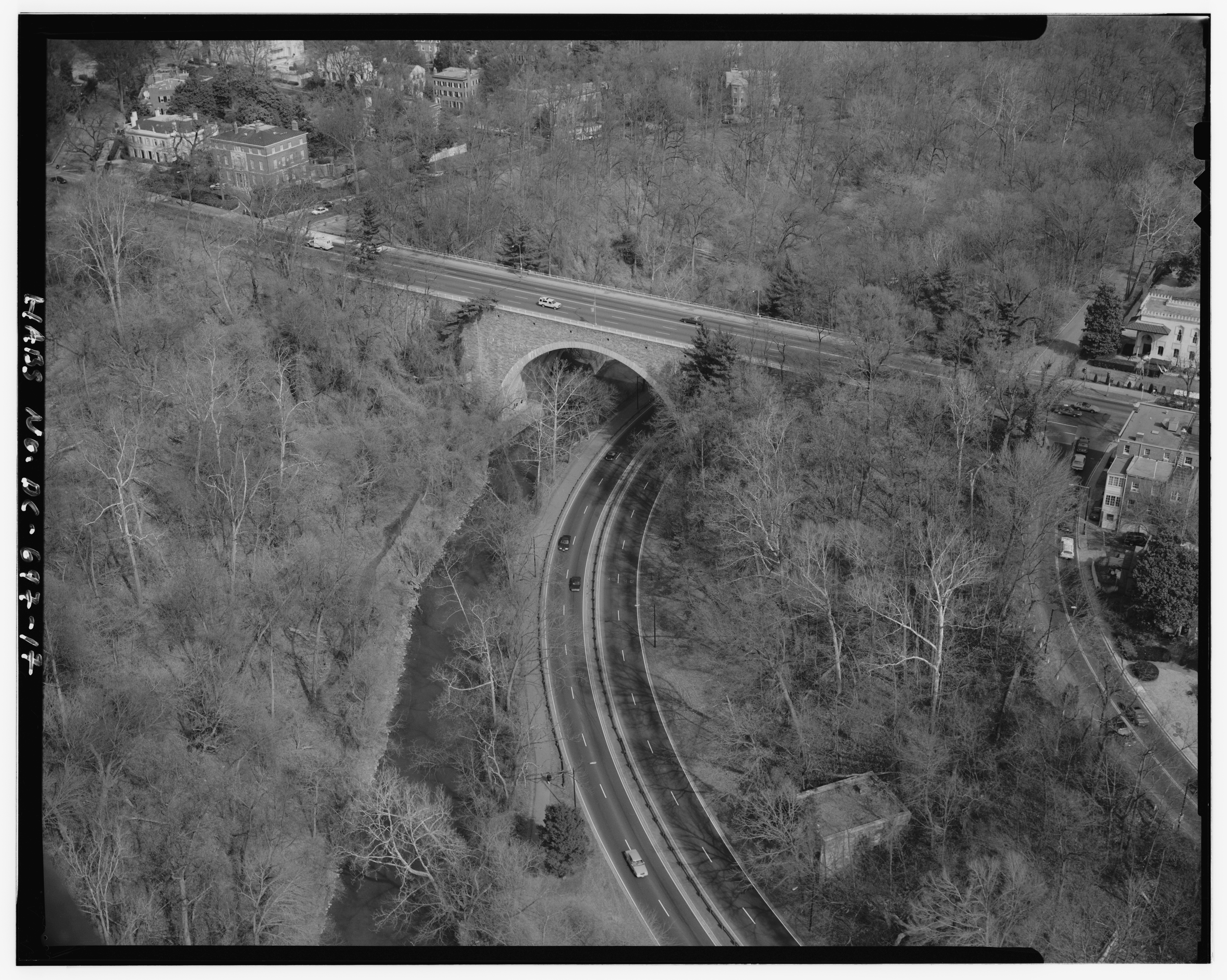
- Aerial view of the Charles C. Glover Memorial Bridge
- Coordinates: 38°55′4″N 77°3′30″W
- Carries: Massachusetts Avenue
- Crosses: Rock Creek
- Locale: Northwest Washington, D.C.
- Official name: Massachusetts Avenue Bridge
- Named for: Charles C. Glover
- Heritage status: Historic American Engineering Record in Washington, D.C.

Characteristics
- Total length: 386.2 ft

History
- Architect: Louis Justement
- Construction end: 1941

Location
- Interactive map of Charles C. Glover Memorial Bridge

The Charles C. Glover Memorial Bridge or Massachusetts Avenue Bridge in Northwest Washington, D.C. conveys Massachusetts Avenue over Rock Creek and Rock Creek Park. The concrete arch bridge was constructed in 1939–41 and has a length of 386.2 feet (117.7 m).

== History and name ==
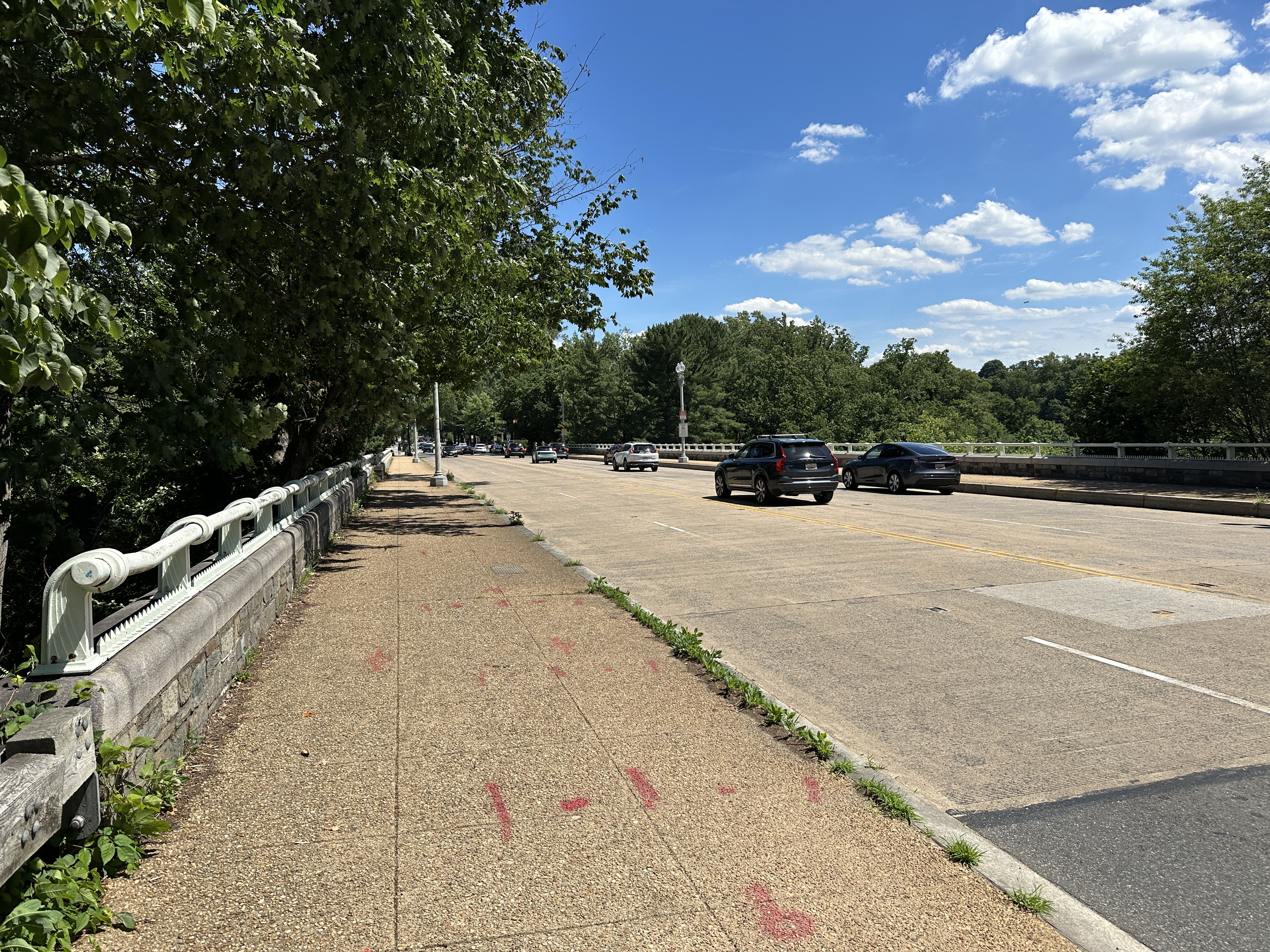
Massachusetts Avenue NW on the bridge

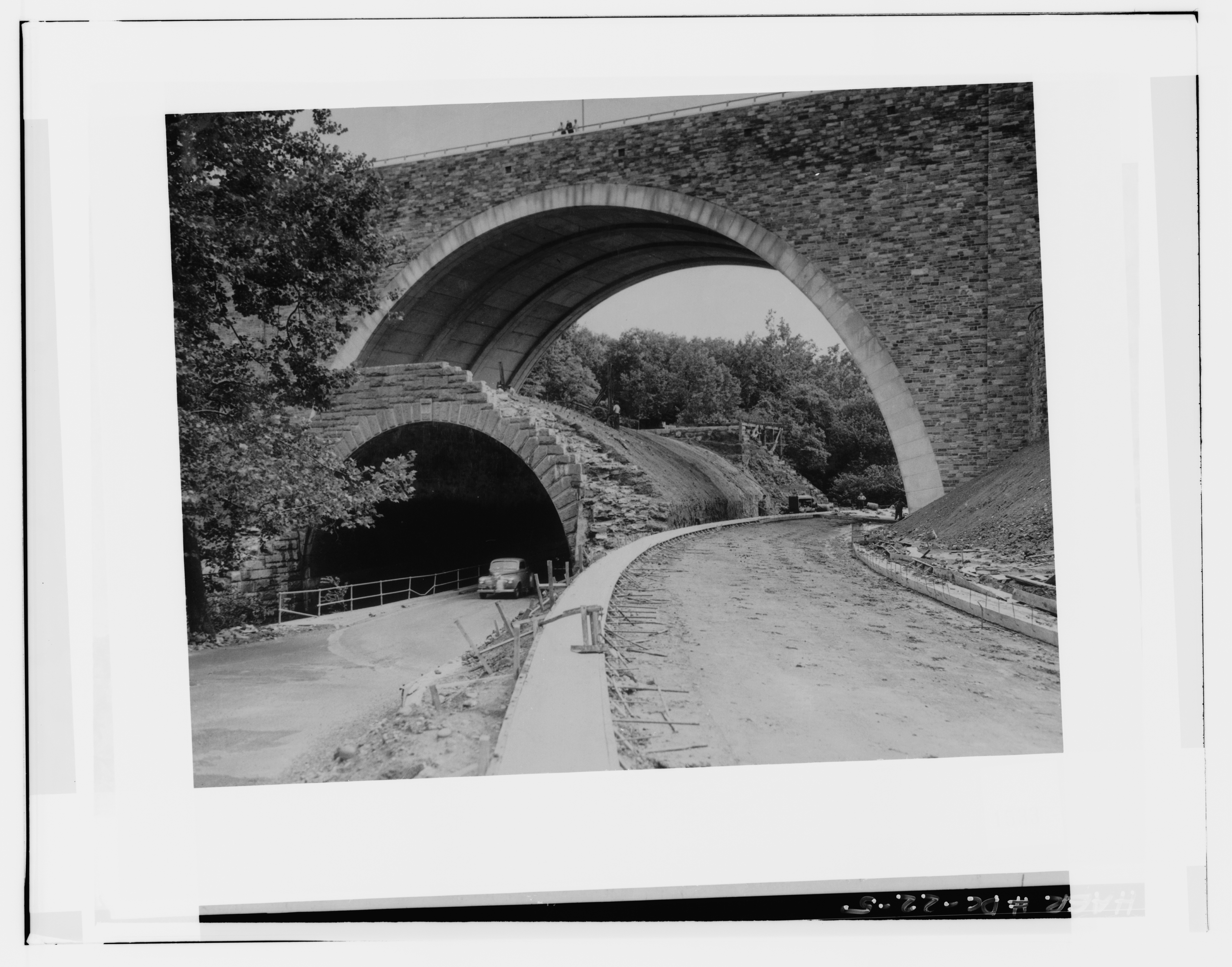
The newly built bridge and the lower land fill and culvert being dismantled, 1941.

A much smaller iron truss bridge was built at the bottom of the valley in 1888, following the decision to extend Massachusetts Avenue beyond Florida Avenue. In 1901, this bridge was replaced with a land fill, with Rock Creek channeled through a large culvert.

This in turn became inconvenient when Rock Creek Parkway was built in the 1930s. The construction of the bridge also allowed the level of Massachusetts Avenue to be raised significantly compared with the earlier bridge and land fill.

The bridge was named after Charles Carroll Glover, who had played a decisive role in shaping this area of Northwest Washington and who died in 1936.

On November 20, 1946, Stephen Norman, grandson of Theodor Herzl, jumped off the bridge to his death three weeks after learning that his whole family had been murdered in the Holocaust.

== See also ==
- List of bridges documented by the Historic American Engineering Record in Washington, D.C.
