= Riggs National Bank =

- U.S. National Register of Historic Places
- U.S. Historic district – Contributing property
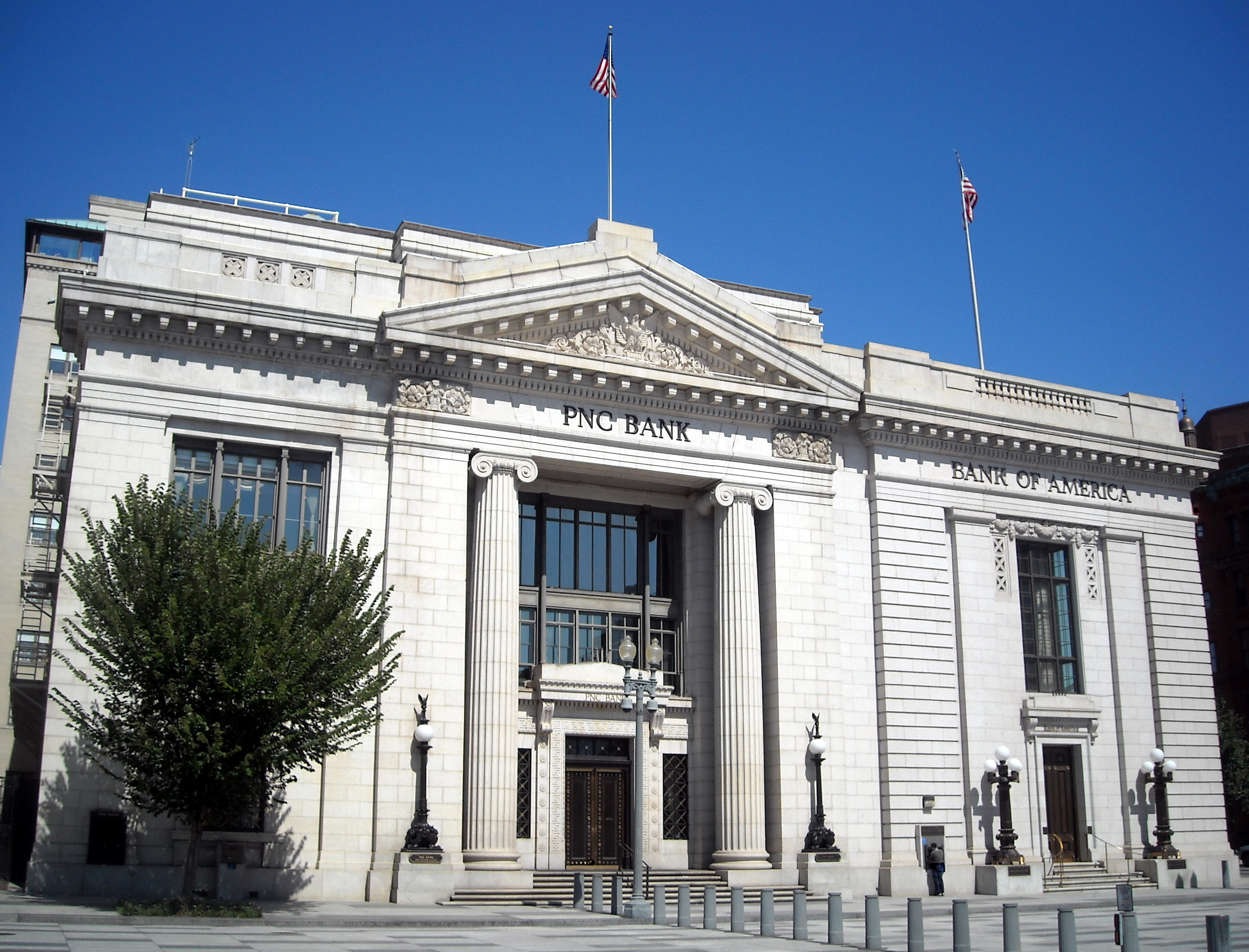
- PNC Bank (formerly Riggs National Bank) in 2009

- Location within Central Washington, D.C. Location within the District of Columbia Location within the United States
- Location: 1503–1505 Pennsylvania Avenue, N.W., Washington, District of Columbia
- Coordinates: 38°53′56.5″N 77°2′2.8″W
- Built: 1899
- NRHP reference No.: 73002113
- Added to NRHP: July 16, 1973

Riggs National Bank is the historic former headquarters building of Riggs Bank, located at 1503–1505 Pennsylvania Avenue, Northwest, Washington, D.C., in the downtown Washington, D.C. neighborhood.

Designed by architects York and Sawyer in 1899 and completed in 1902, the building is an example of Classical Revival architecture. A western office wing designed by Appleton P. Clark Jr. was added between 1922 and 1924.

Riggs National Bank was added to the National Register of Historic Places in 1973. The building is also a contributing property to the Fifteenth Street Financial Historic District and the Lafayette Square Historic District.

== See also ==
- Riggs National Bank, Washington Loan and Trust Company Branch, also NRHP-listed in Washington, D.C.
