= Charles Henry Poor =

American U.S. Navy officer

- Born: June 11, 1808; Cambridge, Massachusetts, U.S.
- Died: November 5, 1882 (aged 74); Washington, D.C., U.S.
- Burial place: Oak Hill Cemetery; Washington, D.C., U.S.
- Spouse: Mattie Lindsay Stark
- Children: 2
- Military career
- Allegiance: United States of America
- Branch: United States Navy
- Service years: 1825–1870
- Rank: Rear admiral
- Commands: Brooklyn; Roanoke; St. Louis; Saranac; North Atlantic Squadron
- Conflicts: American Civil War

Rear Admiral Charles Henry Poor (June 11, 1808 – November 5, 1882) was a U.S. Navy officer of the mid-19th century.

Born in Cambridge, Massachusetts, in 1808, Poor entered the Navy in 1825 and served nearly 30 years at sea. During the Civil War, he commanded the Brooklyn, Roanoke, St. Louis, and Saranac. He was promoted to rear admiral in 1868 and commanded the North Atlantic Squadron. Poor retired in 1870 from that post.

Poor married Mattie Lindsay Stark, daughter of Dr. Robert B. Stark. His daughters Elizabeth Lindsey Poor and Annie Cunnigham Poor married rear admiral Theodore Frelinghuysen Jewell (on June 15, 1871) and philanthropist Charles Carroll Glover, respectively. Poor died on November 5, 1882, in Washington, D.C. He was interred at Oak Hill Cemetery in Washington, D.C.

== Dates of rank ==
- Midshipman, 1 March 1825
- Passed midshipman, 4 June 1831
- Lieutenant, 22 December 1835
- Commander, 14 September 1855
- Captain, 16 July 1862
- Commodore, 2 January 1863
- Rear admiral, 20 September 1868

Military offices
Preceded by Henry K. Hoff	Commander-in-Chief, North Atlantic Squadron; 19 August 1869–9 June 1870	Succeeded by Samuel Phillips Lee
