= Glover-Archbold Park =

Park in Washington, D.C., U.S.

- Glover Archbold Park
- U.S. National Register of Historic Places
- D.C. Inventory of Historic Sites
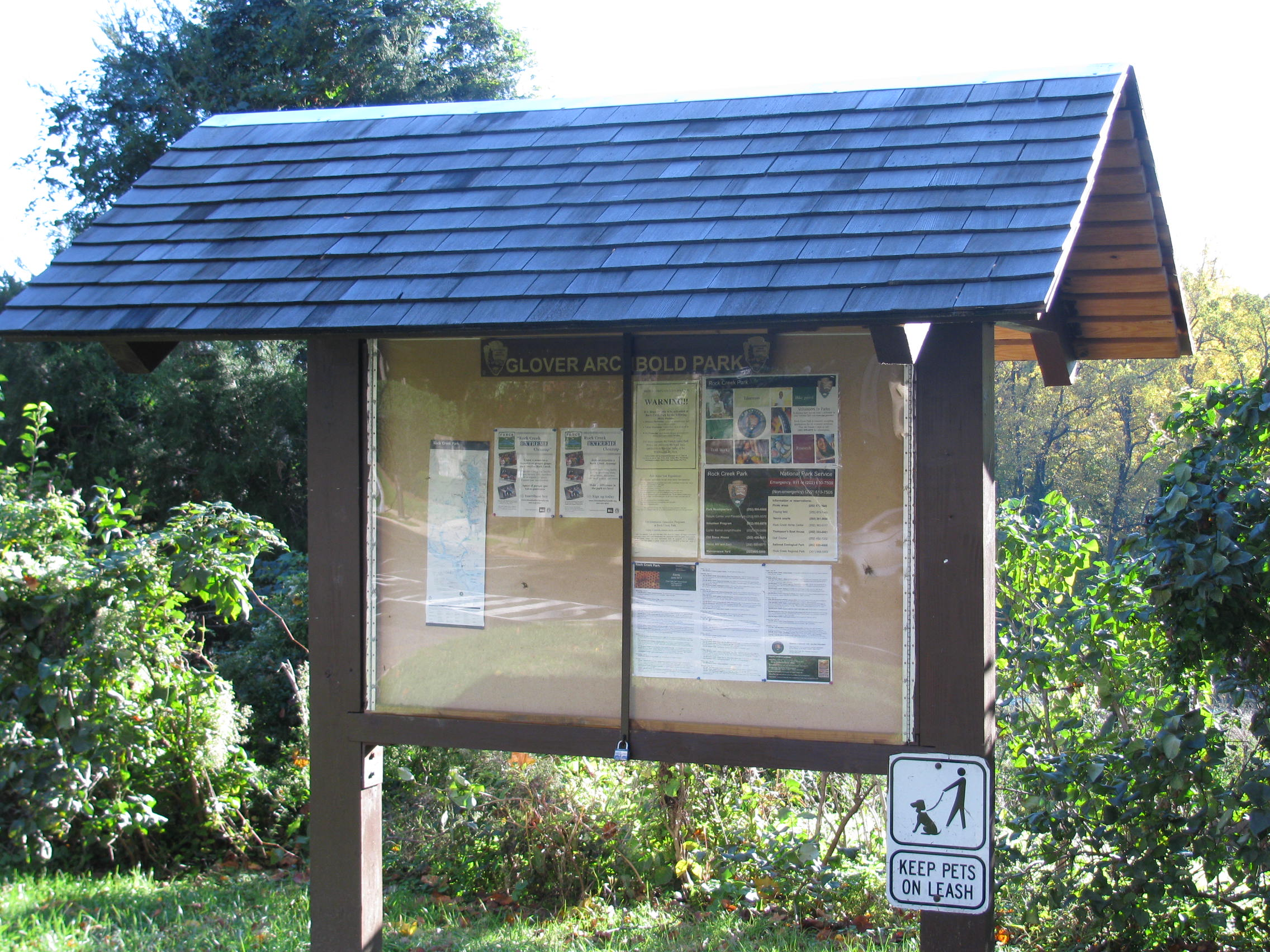
- Glover-Archbold Park sign (2011)

- Location within Washington, D.C.
- Location: Foundry Branch, NW; Washington, D.C.
- Coordinates: 38°55′31.32″N 77°4′55.33″W
- Area: 183 acres (74 ha)
- NRHP reference No.: 06001260

Significant dates
- Added to NRHP: January 16, 2007
- Designated DCIHS: November 8, 1964

Glover Archbold Park is a 183-acre quasi-natural, stream-valley park in Northwest Washington, D.C., on the western edge of Georgetown University and adjacent to the Burleith-Hillandale, Glover Park, McLean Gardens, and Westchester neighborhoods. One of the "finger parks" of Rock Creek Park, the Glover-Archbold Park is administered by the National Park Service (NPS).

The park includes a historical Victory Garden on W Street NW and the portion of Foundry Branch from Van Ness Street to Canal Road along the Potomac River. Several temporary streams, some originating from springs, flow into Foundry Branch.

== History ==
The land that is today Glover Archbold Park included a portion of the right-of-way of the Washington and Great Falls Electric Railway Company, which began operating streetcar service from Georgetown along the north bank of the Potomac River in 1895. The streetcar line crossed Foundry Branch and its valley on Foundry Branch Trestle Bridge, a 280-foot steel Pratt truss bridge. The last streetcar crossed the trestle in 1960. The trestle was acquired in 1997 by the Washington Metropolitan Area Transit Authority (WMATA) transit agency, whose efforts to obtain permission to demolish it were thwarted by preservationists until 2026. In June 2026, the National Park Service announced a Memorandum of Agreement allowing WMATA to demolish the bridge.

Glover Archbold Park is named after Charles Carroll Glover and Anne Mills Archbold, who donated its land in 1924.

In 1947, Senator Carl Hayden proposed to build a four-lane divided highway called Arizona Avenue through the park from Canal Road in Georgetown to Wisconsin Avenue in Friendship Heights. Hayden's proposed highway was not built; the path is now the Glover Archbold Trail and the Massachusetts-39th Trail. Weaver Street and Weaver Place were renamed Arizona Avenue in 1954 after a suggestion by the American University Park Citizens' Association. In 1963, the conservationist and writer Rachel Carson, accompanied by several members of the Audubon Naturalist Society, visited Glover Archbold Park. Georgetown University students have been studying and learning from the park since at least 1975.
