= John Dustin Archbold =

American businessman and Standard Oil executive

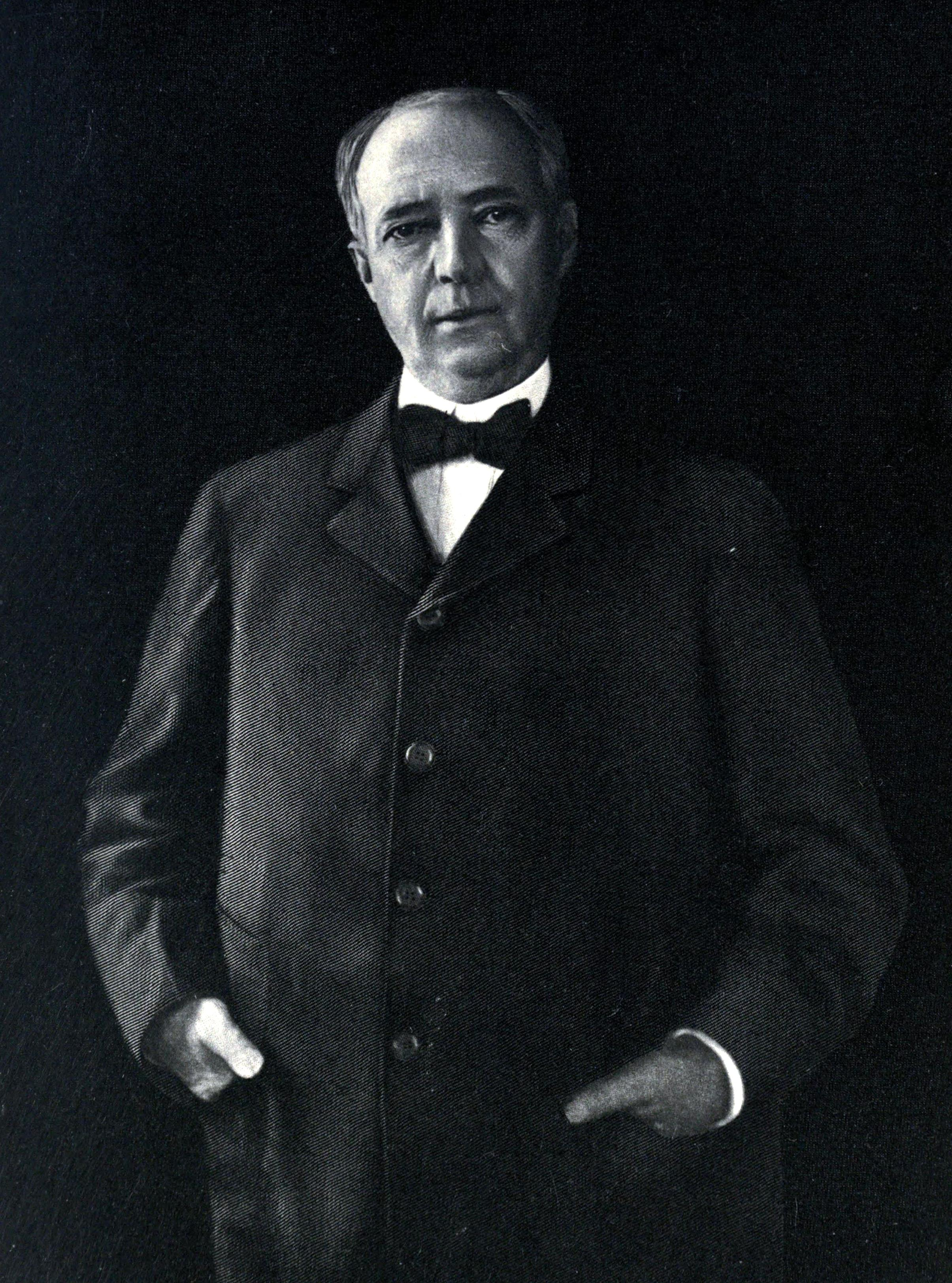
- Born: July 26, 1848; Leesburg, Ohio, US
- Died: December 5, 1916 (aged 68); Tarrytown, New York, US
- Burial place: Sleepy Hollow Cemetery, Sleepy Hollow, New York
- Political party: Republican
- Spouse: Annie Eliza Mills
- Children: 4, including Anne

6th President of the Standard Oil Company (New Jersey)
- In office December 4, 1911 – December 5, 1916
- Preceded by: John D. Rockefeller
- Succeeded by: Alfred C. Bedford

John Dustin Archbold (July 26, 1848 – December 5, 1916) was an American businessman and one of the United States' earliest oil refiners. His small oil company was bought out by John D. Rockefeller's Standard Oil Company. Archbold rose rapidly at Standard Oil, handling many of the complex secret negotiations over the years. By 1882, he was Rockefeller's closest associate, and typically acted as the company's primary spokesman. Rockefeller, after 1896, left business matters to Archbold while he pursued his philanthropy; as vice president, Archbold effectively ran Standard Oil until his death in 1916. Inspired by Rockefeller's policies, Archbold's main goals were stabilization, efficiency, and minimizing waste in refining and distributing petroleum products. When the company was broken up by the Supreme Court in 1911 into 34 smaller operations, Archbold became president of the largest one, Standard Oil of New Jersey.

== Personal life ==
Archbold was born to Methodist minister Reverend Israel Archbold and Frances Foster Dana (Archbold) in Leesburg, Ohio. After being educated in public schools, he moved to Pennsylvania by 1864.

On February 20, 1870, Archbold married Annie Eliza Mills, "daughter of Samuel Myers Mills of Titusville and Lavinia Jenkins." The couple had four children:

- Mary Lavina Archbold (b 1871)
- Anne Mills Archbold (b 1873), mother of John Dana Archbold
- Frances Dana Archbold (b 1875)
- John Foster Archbold (b 1877–1930), father of zoologist Richard Archbold

In 1885, Archbold purchased a large mansion in Tarrytown, New York. The estate, called Cedar Cliff, was located at 279 S. Broadway just across from the Carmelite Transfiguration Church.

== Professional life ==
=== Standard Oil Company ===
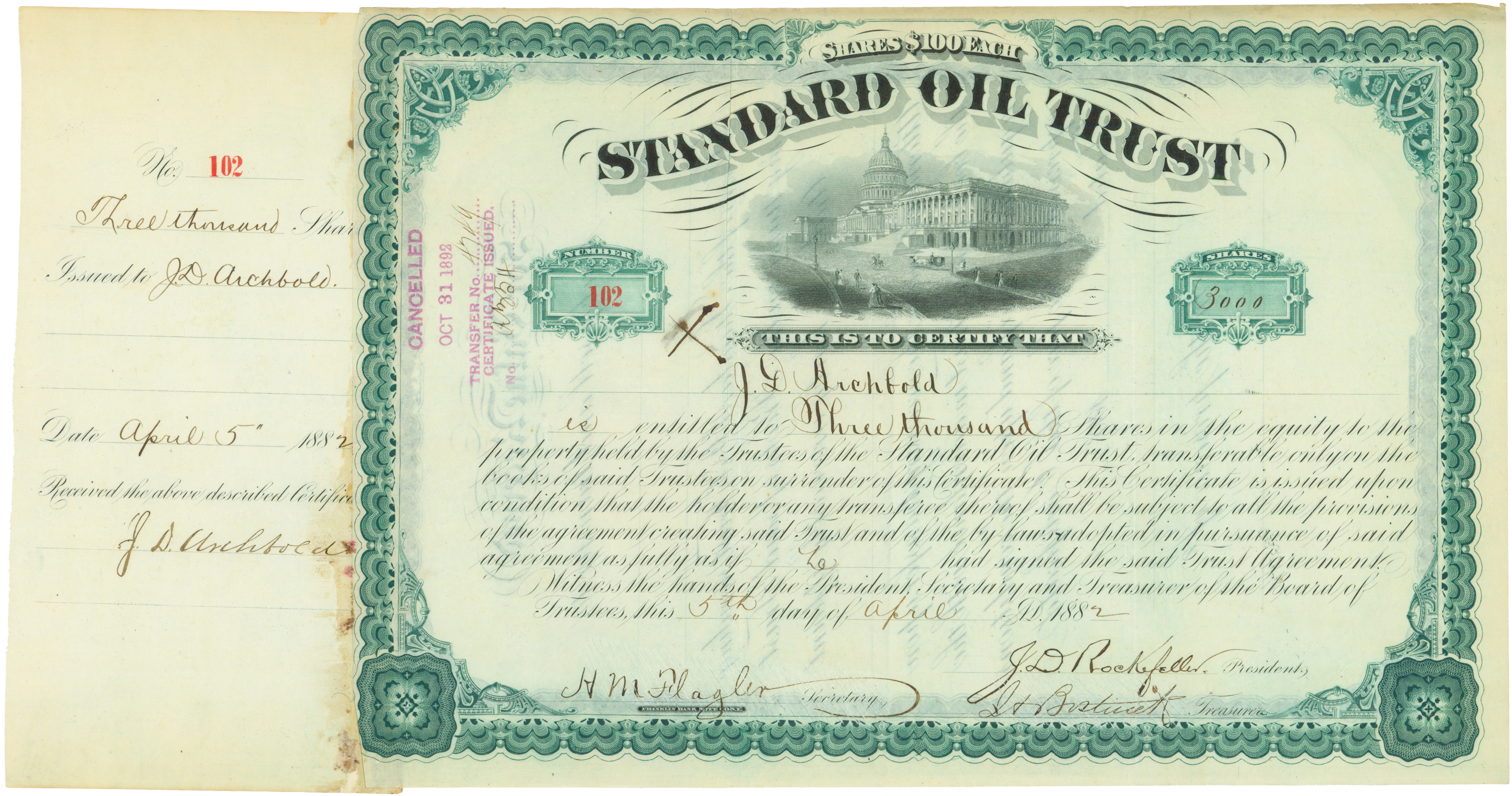
Share of the Standard Oil Trust, issued 5 April 1882, made out to John Dustin Archbold

In 1864, Archbold went to the north-west Pennsylvania oil fields and spent 11 years in the oil industry there. When John D. Rockefeller's Standard Oil Company began buying up refiners in this oil-rich region, many independent refiners felt squeezed out, and Archbold was among Standard's harshest and loudest critics. In 1885, after becoming skeptical of reports of oil discoveries in Oklahoma, he sold-out at a loss, saying "I'll drink every gallon produced west of the Mississippi!"

Archbold was subsequently recruited by Rockefeller to Standard Oil, where he became a director and served as its vice-president and president until its dissolution in 1911. Between 1911 and 1916, Archbold was president of the Standard Oil Company of New Jersey.

Archbold once made a $250,000 donation to the National Kindergarten Association, to whose board of directors his wife was elected in 1911.

=== The Hepburn Committee ===
A. Barton Hepburn was directed by the New York State Legislature in 1879 to investigate the railroads' practice of giving rebates within the state. Merchants without ties to the oil industry had pressed for the hearings. Prior to the committee's investigation, few knew of the size of Standard Oil's control and influence on seemingly unaffiliated oil refineries and pipelines – Hawke (1980) cites that only a dozen or so within Standard Oil knew the extent of company operations. The committee counsel, Simon Sterne, questioned representatives from the Erie Railroad and the New York Central Railroad and discovered that at least half of their long-haul traffic granted rebates, and that much of this traffic came from Standard Oil. The committee then shifted focus to Standard Oil's operations. John Dustin Archbold, as president of Acme Oil Company, denied that Acme was associated with Standard Oil. He then admitted to being a director of Standard Oil. The committee's final report scolded the railroads for their rebate policies and cited Standard Oil as an example. This scolding was largely moot to Standard Oil's interests since long-distance oil pipelines were now their preferred method of transportation.

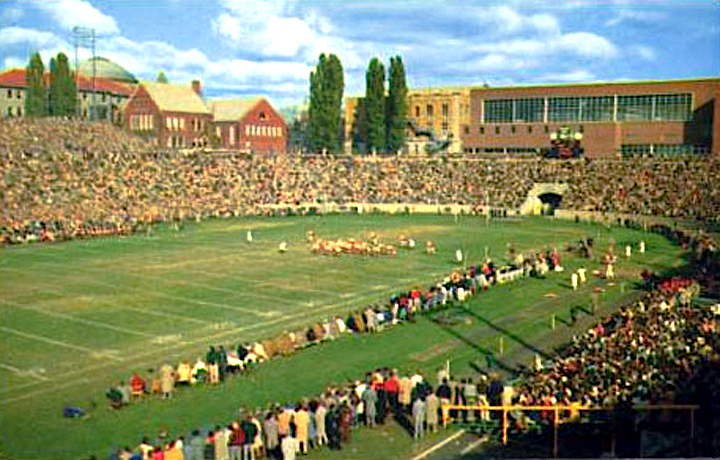
Archbold Stadium, Syracuse University

=== Syracuse University ===
In 1886, Archbold became a member of the board of trustees of Syracuse University, and was the board's president from 1893 until his death in 1916. From 1893 to 1914, he contributed nearly $6,000,000 for eight buildings, including the full cost of Archbold Stadium (opened 1907, demolished 1978; the Carrier Dome was built on this site), Sims Hall (men's dormitory, 1907), Archbold Gymnasium (1908, nearly destroyed by fire in 1947, but still in use), and the oval athletic field.

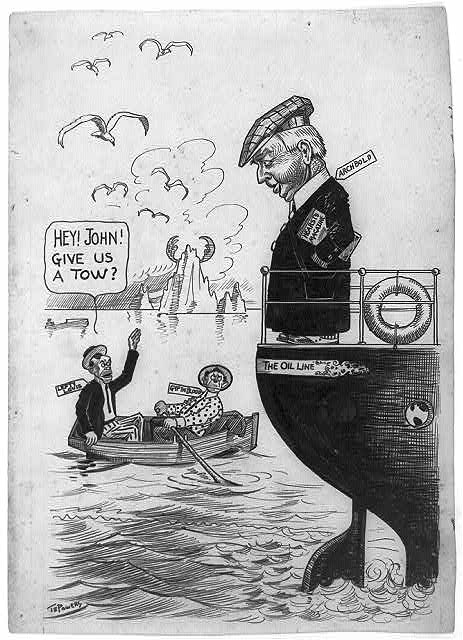
1912 political cartoon (Thomas E. Powers, US Library of Congress)

=== Theodore Roosevelt scandal ===
Archbold was involved in a scandalous affair involving monetary gifts to the Republican Party. In 1912, he was called to testify before a committee which was investigating political contributions made by the Standard Oil Company to the campaign funds of political parties. He claimed that President Theodore Roosevelt was aware of the $125,000 contribution made by Standard Oil Company to the 1904 campaign fund of the Republican Party, but Roosevelt produced letters written by him which directed his campaign managers to return such monetary contributions if they were offered.

=== Assassination attempt ===
In 1915, an attempt was made by anarchists and Industrial Workers of the World radicals to assassinate Archbold at Cedar Cliff by planting a large dynamite bomb at the entrance to the estate. The bomb, which failed to go off, was discovered by Archbold's gardener. Police suspected that the attempted bombing was precipitated by the execution by firing squad of 'Joe Hill', alias Joseph Hillstrom in Salt Lake City, Utah, the day before. Hill was an IWW member, songwriter and labor organizer who had been convicted of murder.

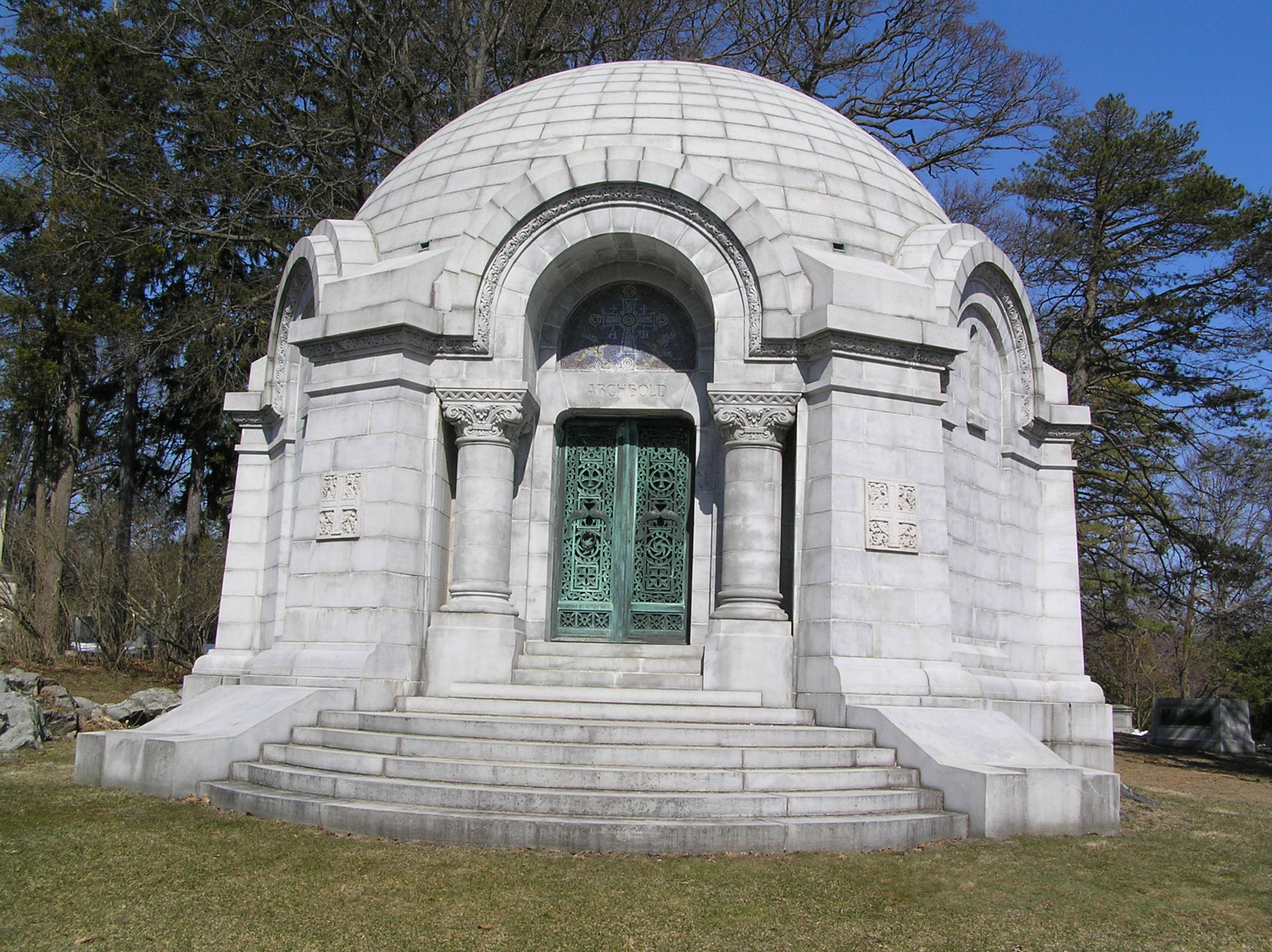
The Archbold Mausoleum, Sleepy Hollow Cemetery, New York

== Death ==
Archbold died of complications from appendicitis in Tarrytown, New York, on December 5, 1916, aged 68. He is buried in Sleepy Hollow Cemetery in Sleepy Hollow, New York.

== Legacy ==
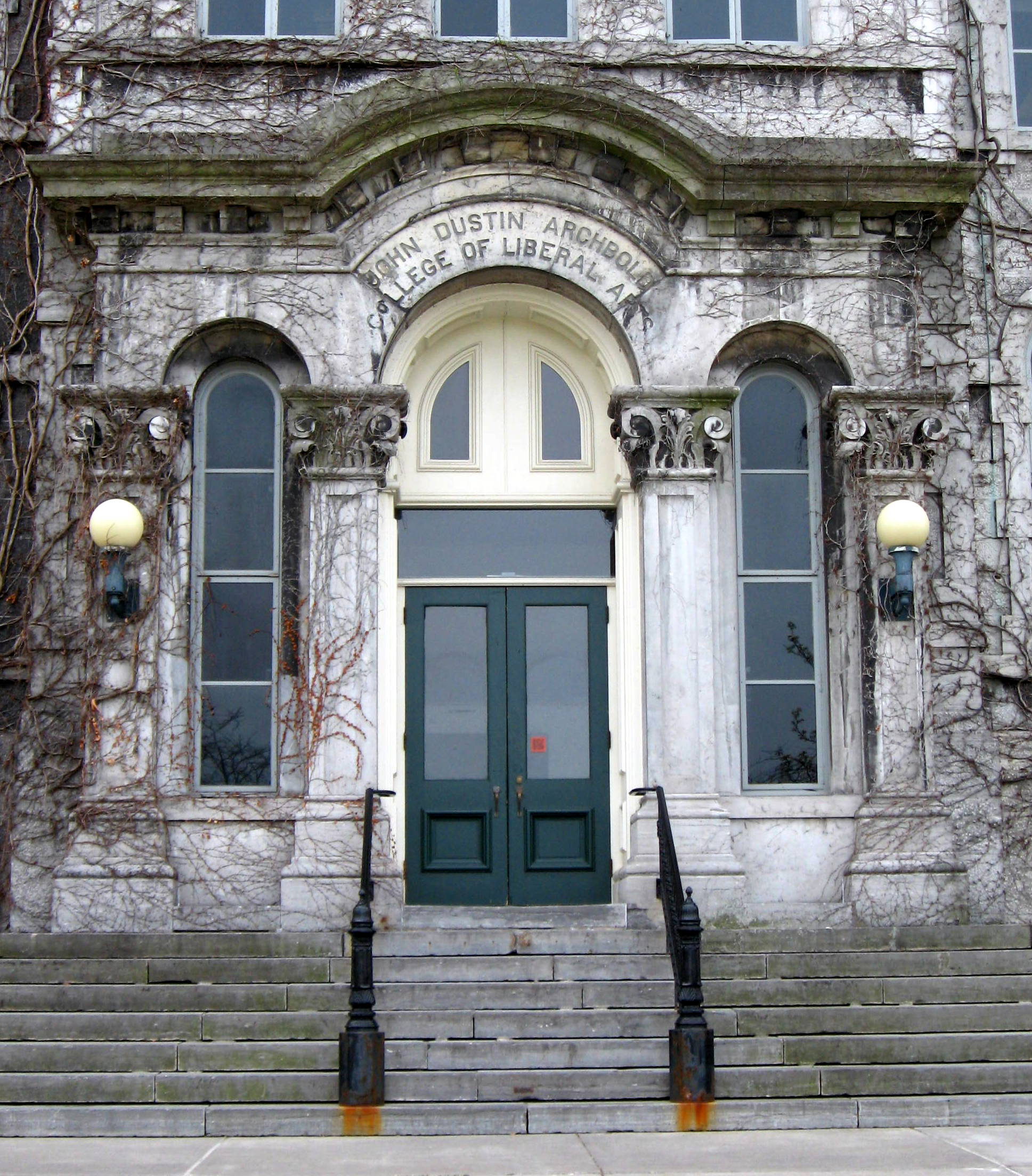
Main Entrance, Hall of Languages, Syracuse University

- In 1914, the "John Dustin Archbold College of Liberal Arts" at Syracuse University was renamed in his honor. The entrance to the university's Hall of Languages remains inscribed with this name.
- The John D. Archbold Memorial Hospital, now the Archbold Medical Center, in Thomasville, Georgia, was established in 1925, through a donation by his son, John Foster Archbold.
- His grandson, John Dana Archbold, was a member of the Board of Trustees of Syracuse University from 1976 to 1993.
- The John Dana Archbold Theatre at Syracuse Stage (Central New York's only professional theater) is named after his grandson.
- Another heir, grandson Richard Archbold, established Archbold Biological Station in 1941 on Lake Placid, Florida, land donated by John A. Roebling II.
- Namesake of the tanker vessel John Dustin Archbold (1914).
- His grandson, John Dana Archbold (Choate '29), is the namesake of Archbold House, a dormitory and the admissions building of Choate Rosemary Hall. It also houses the Head of School and Associate Head of School's offices. The building was built in 1928 using funds donated by J. Dustin's daughter and J. Dana's mother Anne Saunders Archbold, and it originally served as an infirmary.

== See also ==
- James Roscoe Day
