= Greater Allen A. M. E. Cathedral of New York =

Church in Queens, New York

Coordinates: 40°41′42.59″N 73°46′53.58″W

Greater Allen African Methodist Episcopal Cathedral
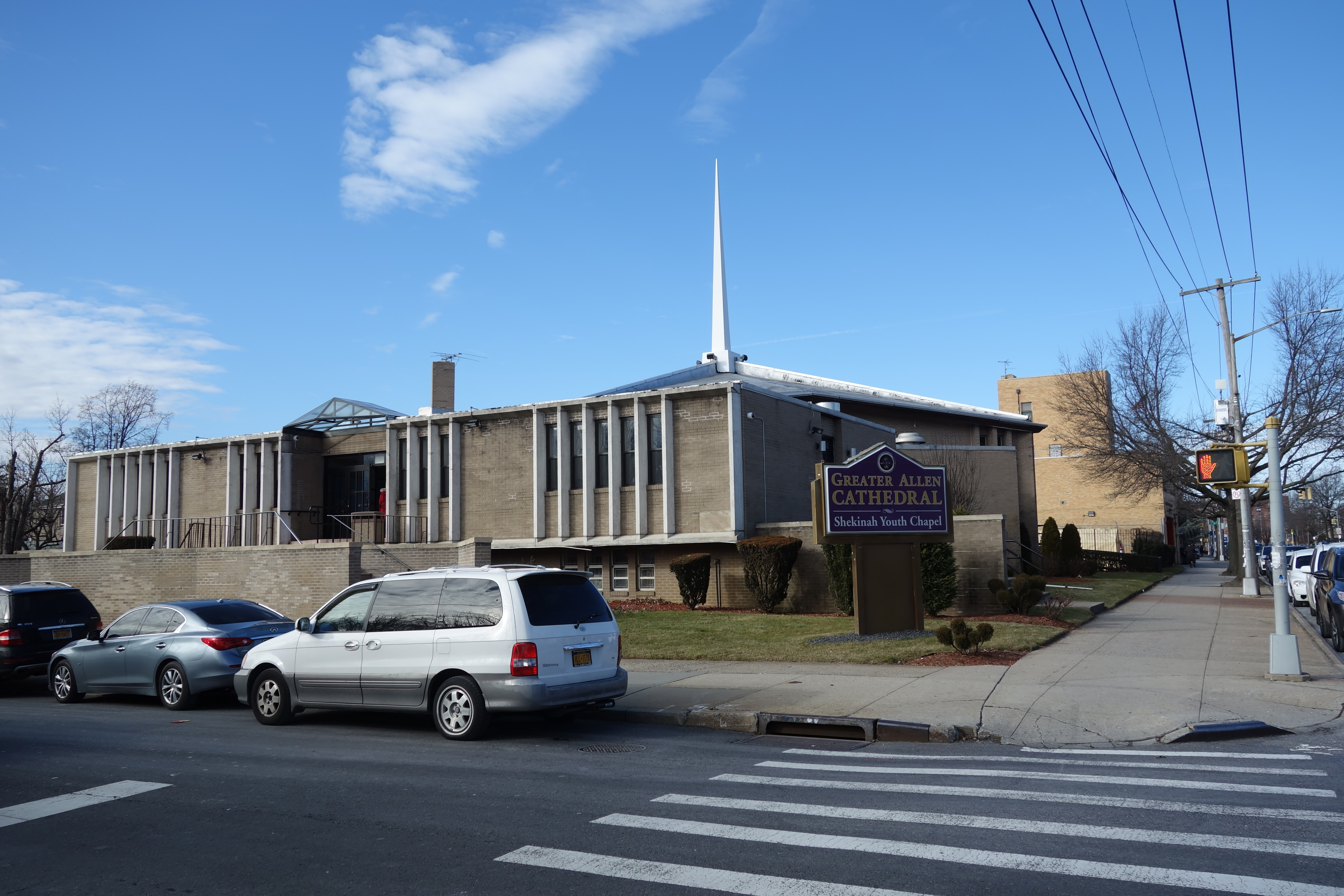
- The Greater Allen Cathedral in 2019.

Religion
- Affiliation: African Methodist Episcopal Church
- Status: Active

Location
- Location: Jamaica, Queens, New York, United States of America
- State: New York
- Interactive map of Greater Allen African Methodist Episcopal Cathedral

Architecture
- Type: Cathedral

The Greater Allen Cathedral of New York is an African Methodist Episcopal church located in Jamaica, Queens, New York. The congregation currently has over 24,500 members, making it one of the largest churches in the United States. Its annual budget exceeds $72 million.

GAC once operated a 750-student private school, (Pre-K through 8th Grade, now called The Eagle Academy of Queens.) Additionally, the church offers numerous commercial and social service enterprises. Allen holds a number of expansive commercial and residential properties and coordinates a number of subsidiary organizations.

GAC has been named one of the nation's most productive religious and urban development institutions, and is one of the Borough of Queens largest employers. The church had been pastored by Floyd Flake and his wife Elaine for nearly five decades. Floyd Flake also served as the president of Wilberforce University—his alma mater and a former United States Congressman.

Flake's wife, M. Elaine Flake, was appointed by Bishop Gregory Ingram to serve as senior Pastor when Floyd Flake retired in 2020. (The African Methodist Episcopal Church has a mandatory retirement age of 75. All clergymen must retire at the Annual Conference nearest to their 75th birthday.) On June 16, 2024, Rev. Stephen A. Green was appointed by Bishop Julius Harrison McAllister Sr.

The parent African Methodist Episcopal denomination is Methodist denomination founded by the Rev. Richard Allen in Philadelphia, Pennsylvania, in 1816. The African Methodist denomination includes other major churches such as the First A.M.E. Church of Los Angeles with over 19,000 members and the Reid Temple A.M.E. Church in Glenn Dale, Maryland with over 15,000 members.

== See also ==
- List of the largest churches in the USA
