= Chain Bridge Road School =

Historic school in Washington, D.C., U.S.

- U.S. National Register of Historic Places
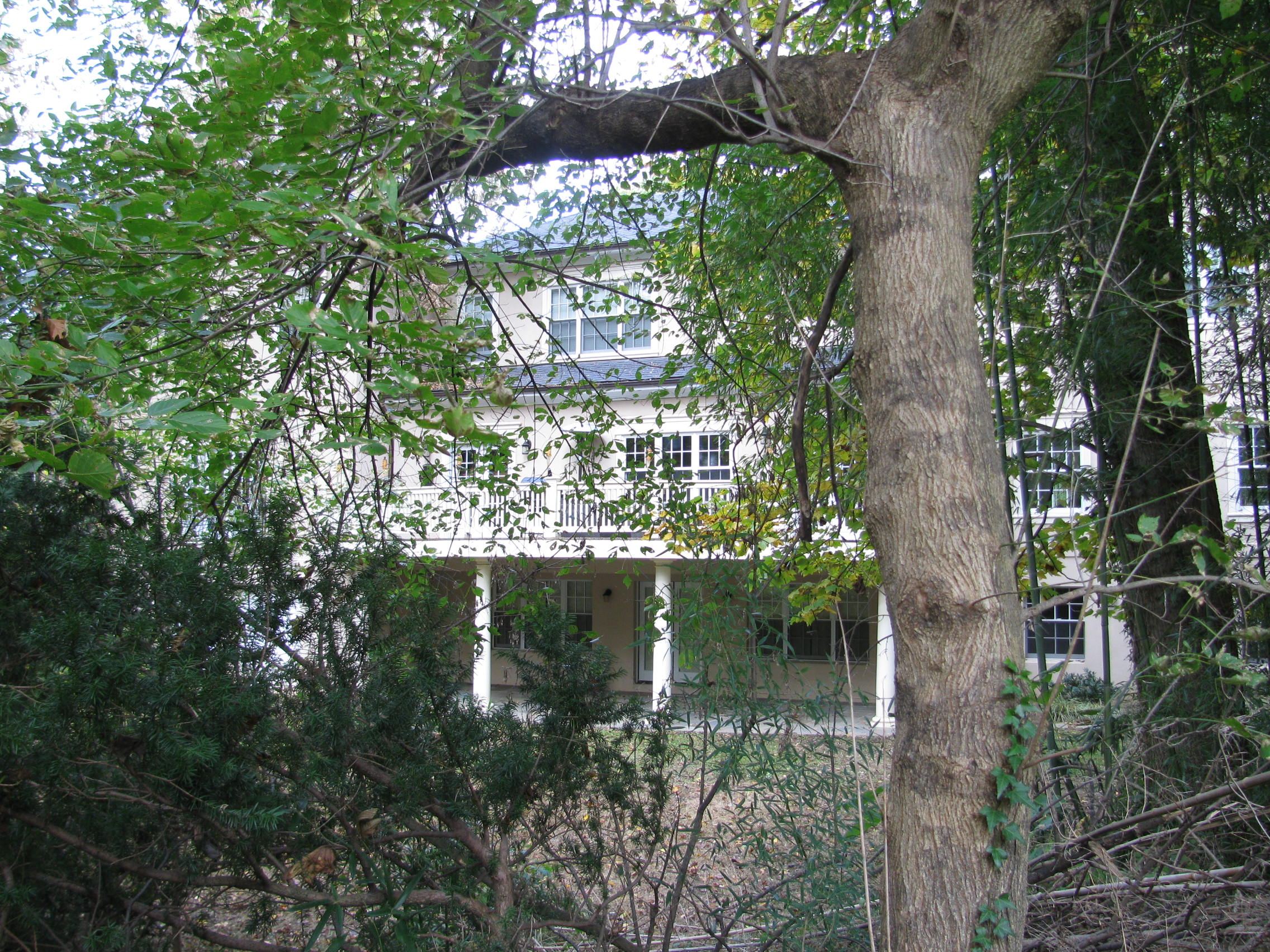
- Chain Bridge Road School in 2011

- Location within District of Columbia
- Location: 2820 Chain Bridge Road, NW; Washington, D.C.
- Coordinates: 38°55′45″N 77°5′48″W
- Area: less than one acre
- Built: 1923
- Architect: Albert L. Harris
- Architectural style: Colonial Revival
- MPS: Public School Buildings of Washington, DC MPS
- NRHP reference No.: 03001255
- Added to NRHP: December 9, 2003

The Chain Bridge Road School is an historic school, located at 2820 Chain Bridge Road, Northwest, Washington, D.C., in the Palisades neighborhood.

== History ==
It was built in 1923 to a Colonial Revival design by Municipal Architect Albert L. Harris. It replaced a one room schoolhouse from 1865. The school served African American public school students from the neighborhood around Battery Kemble.

== See also ==
- National Register of Historic Places listings in the District of Columbia
