= Bruce School =

The Bruce School may refer to:

- The Blanche Kelso Bruce Elementary School (now the Bruce-Monroe Elementary School at Park View) in Washington, D.C.
- Bruce School (Argyle, Manitoba)
