= First African Methodist Episcopal Church of Los Angeles =

Coordinates: 34.0343°N 118.3062°W

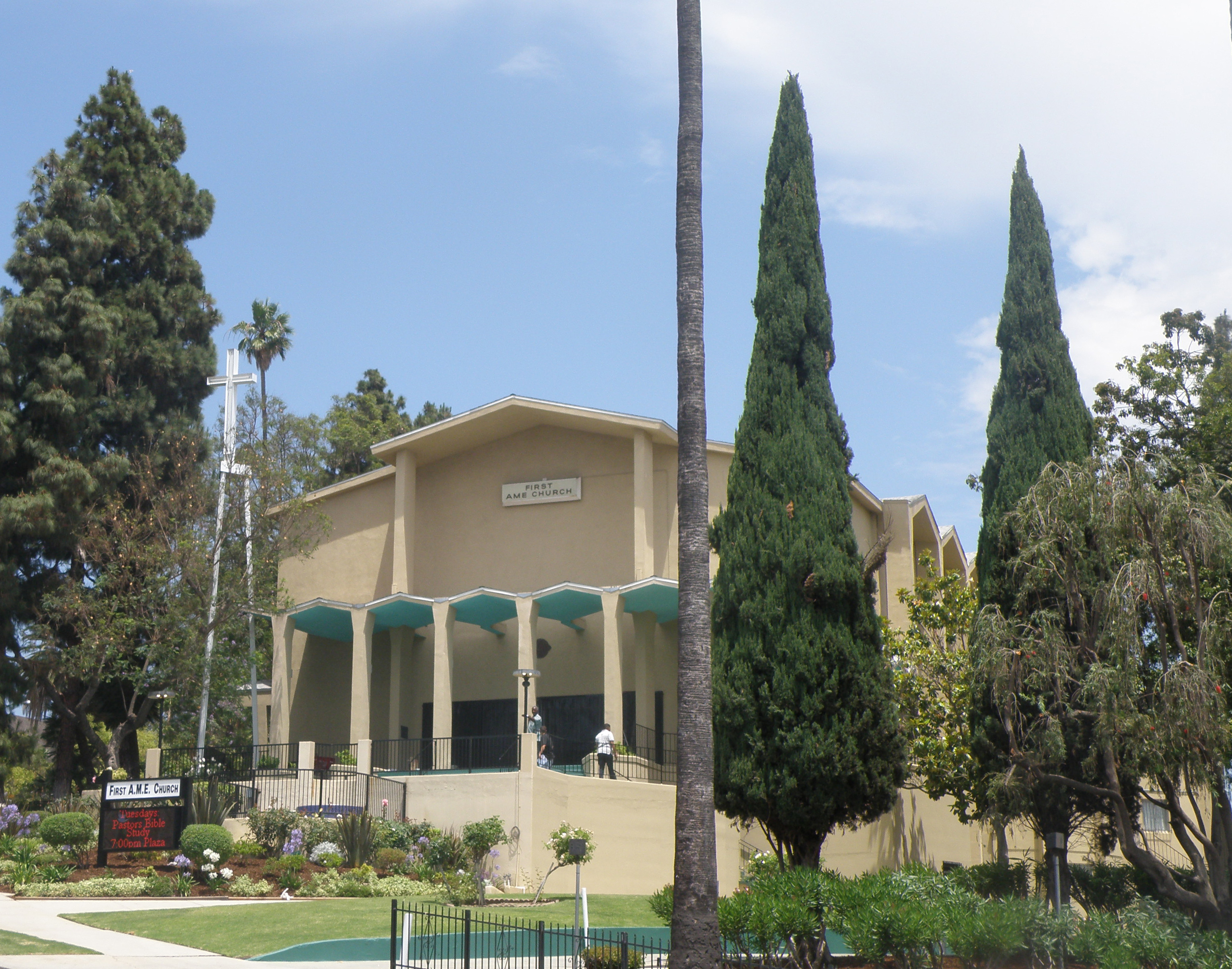
- First AME Church Los Angeles; 2270 S. Harvard Boulevard; Los Angeles, CA
- First African Methodist Episcopal Church of Los Angeles
- Country: United States
- Denomination: African Methodist Episcopal Church
- Website: http://www.famechurch.org/

History
- Founded: 1872

The First African Methodist Episcopal Church of Los Angeles (First A.M.E. or FAME) is a megachurch in Los Angeles, California, United States, part of the African Methodist Episcopal (AME) Church. It is the oldest church founded by African Americans in Los Angeles, dating to 1872. It has more than 19,000 members.

== History ==
The church was established in 1872 under the sponsorship of Biddy Mason, an African American nurse and a California real estate entrepreneur and philanthropist, and her son-in-law Charles Owens. The organizing meetings were held in Mason's home on Spring Street and she donated the land on which the first church was built.

The parent AME Church is a Methodist denomination founded by the Rev. Richard Allen in Philadelphia, Pennsylvania in 1816. The AME Church now has over 2,000,000 members in North and South America, Africa and Europe, and includes other major churches such as the Greater Allen A. M. E. Cathedral of New York with over 23,000 members and the Reid Temple A.M.E. Church in Glenn Dale, Maryland with over 15,000 members.

The former location of this church was at 8th & Towne (1902 - 1968) and in 1971, while at that location, it was nominated as Los Angeles' "#71 Landmark." The location prior to that was on Azusa Street, a building that was rented to the Azusa Street mission. The 8th & Towne building was burned down July 4, 1972, and was razed. The current church, located in the West Adams district, was completed in 1968. It was designed by African American architect Paul R. Williams.

In 1993 Federal authorities unearthed an alleged plot by young men associated with the "Fourth Reich Skinheads" to attack the First AME Church. The accused, said to be planning to blow up the church to ignite a race war, negotiated plea bargains with prosecutors.

=== Leadership ===
In 1977 Rev. Cecil "Chip" Murray was assigned to the church as pastor. At that time, it had 300 members. Under Murray's leadership the church grew during the next 27 years to a membership of 18,000 people.

In 2004 the Reverend Dr. John Joseph Hunter succeeded Cecil Murray as senior minister. In 2008 Hunter entered into a repayment plan to pay for tax obligations, family vacations, clothes and jewelry purchased with church funds. Several church leaders asked the church bishop to remove the pastor and his wife from authority. In November 2009 Hunter settled a sexual harassment complaint he denied for an undisclosed sum. In October 2012, in the face of continuing controversies about his ministry and the church's declining finances, Hunter was transferred to Bethel AME Church in San Francisco, which refused to accept him. His replacement was Rev. J. Edgar Boyd, who served as Bethel AME's pastor for 20 years (1992-2012). In December 2012, the church filed a lawsuit against Hunter, his wife, and others, charging that the Hunters have improperly maintained their control of the church and its assets. Mr. Hunter said he was blindsided by the lawsuit and called the asset control changes lawful.

After 52 years of ministry, Rev. Boyd retired in September 2023; he was succeeded by Rev. Robert Shaw II in October 2023, and he in turn was succeeded in September 2025 by current pastor Rev. Dr. Timothy E. Tyler, son of late AME bishop Carolyn Tyler Guidry, the second woman to be elected as a bishop in the AME church.

== Social involvement ==
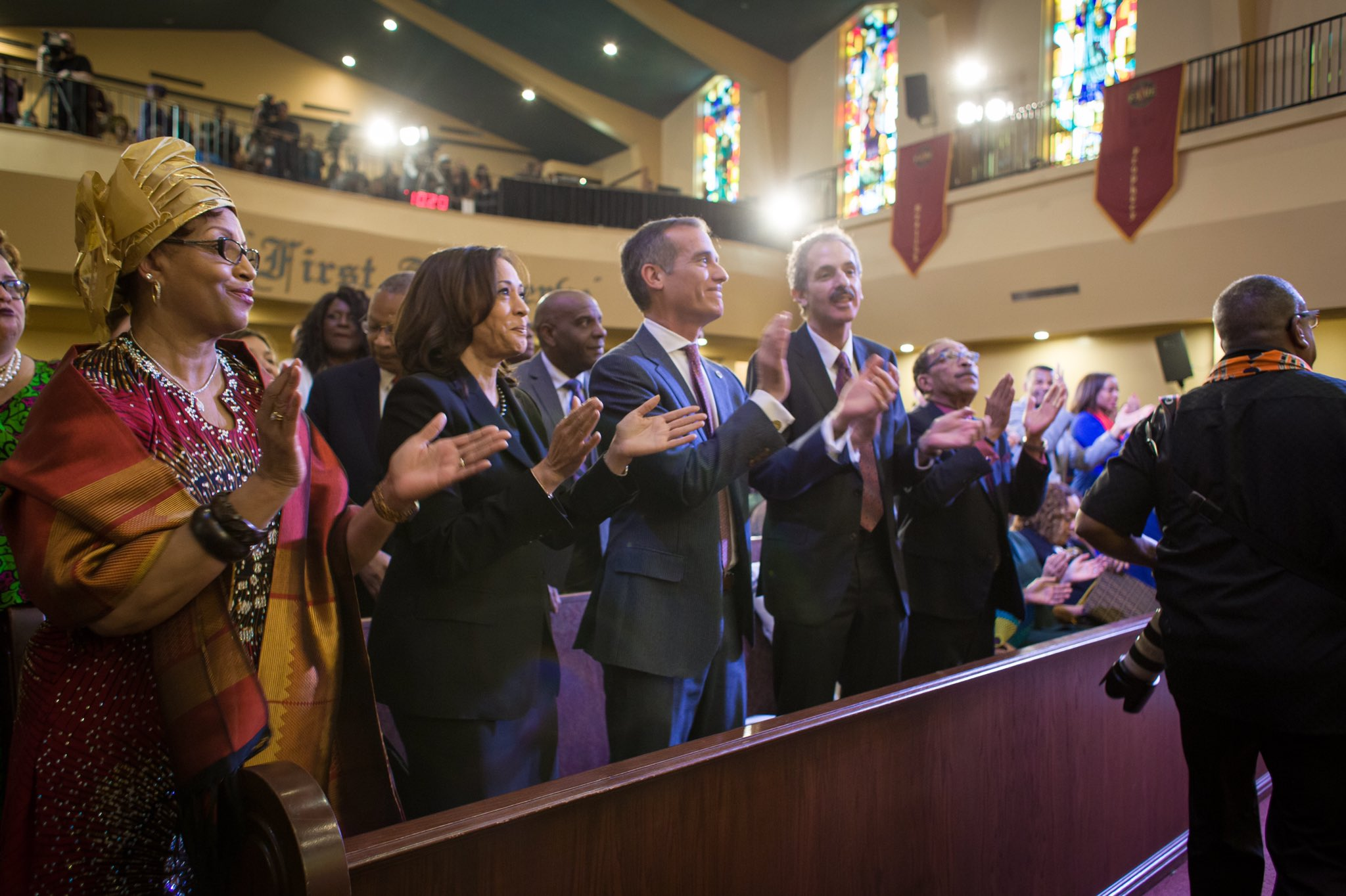
Kamala Harris and Eric Garcetti at the First AME Church of Los Angeles in 2020.

The church is a center of political and social action in the city. In the 80's and 90's, the church created 40 task forces concerned with health, substance abuse, homelessness, emergency food and clothing, housing, training, employment and so on. President George H. W. Bush named the Church the 177th Point of Light for outreach in community services. In December 1989 city officials including Mayor Tom Bradley and First AME leaders broke ground for FAME Arms, a 40-unit apartment complex for physically disabled, low-income people in Southwest Los Angeles.

After an earthquake in January 1994 FAME Renaissance, the nonprofit economic development arm of First AME Church, helped provide loans of up to $25,000 for affected small and new businesses who could not get help otherwise. In September 2009 the church launched an open-air fresh produce market to bring healthful foods to residents of South Los Angeles.

== See also ==
- List of the largest churches in the USA
