= Fletcher's Cove =

Park and recreation area in Washington, D.C., United States

- Location within District of Columbia
- Location: Washington, D.C.
- Coordinates: 38°55′08″N 77°06′11″W

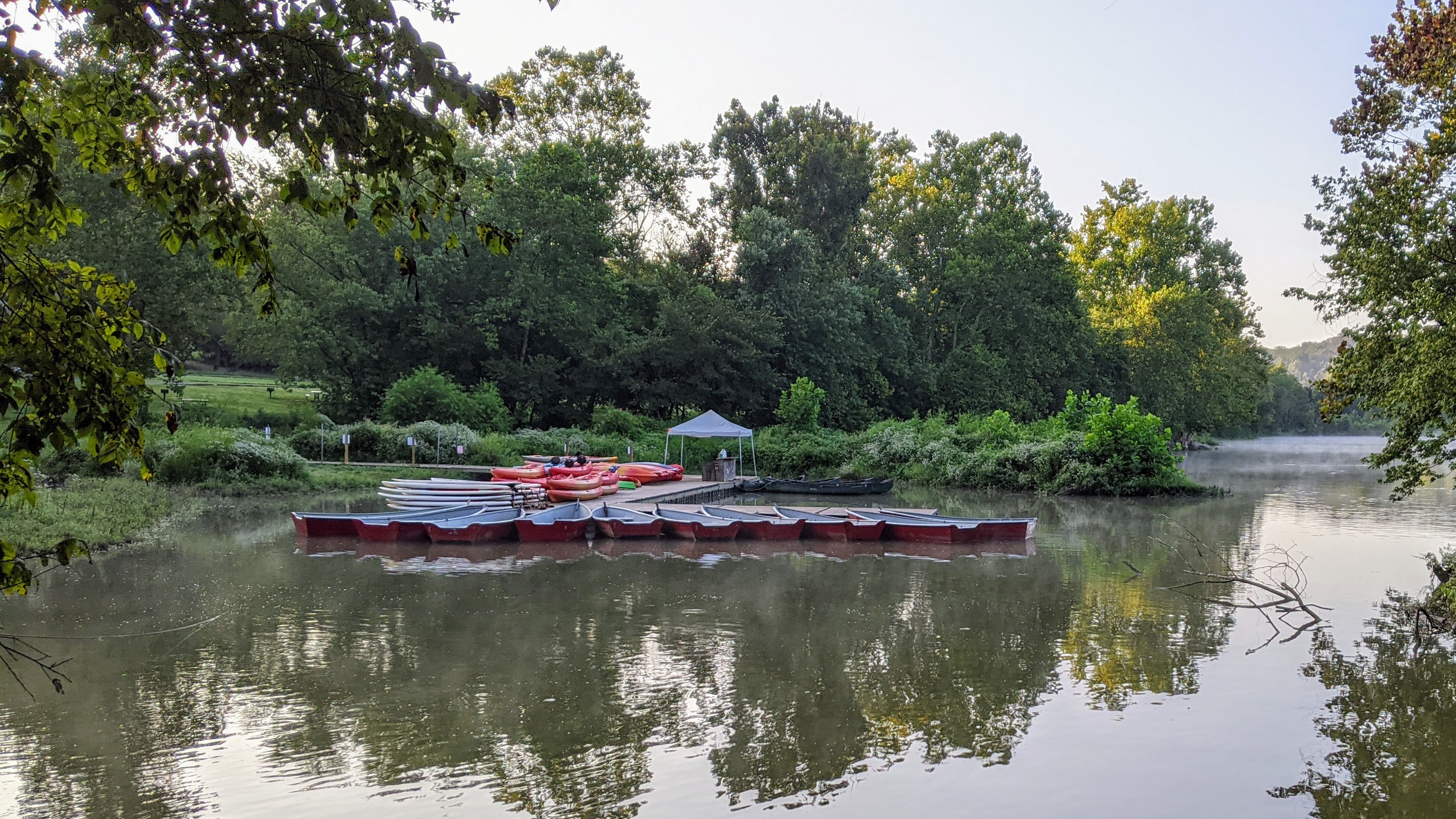

Fletcher's Cove (earlier and still colloquially, Fletcher's Boathouse) is a park and recreation area owned and managed by the National Park Service in The Palisades neighborhood of northwest Washington, D.C.

Located at 4940 Canal Road between the Chain and Key Bridges, it is part of Chesapeake and Ohio Canal National Historical Park.

Fishing enthusiasts visit Fletcher's Cove for the spring run of shad, perch, and rockfish. Others come to boat on the Potomac River and bike, hike, and run the Chesapeake and Ohio Canal and other trails along the river. Fletcher's rents rowboats, canoes, kayaks, bikes, and paddle boards.

== History ==
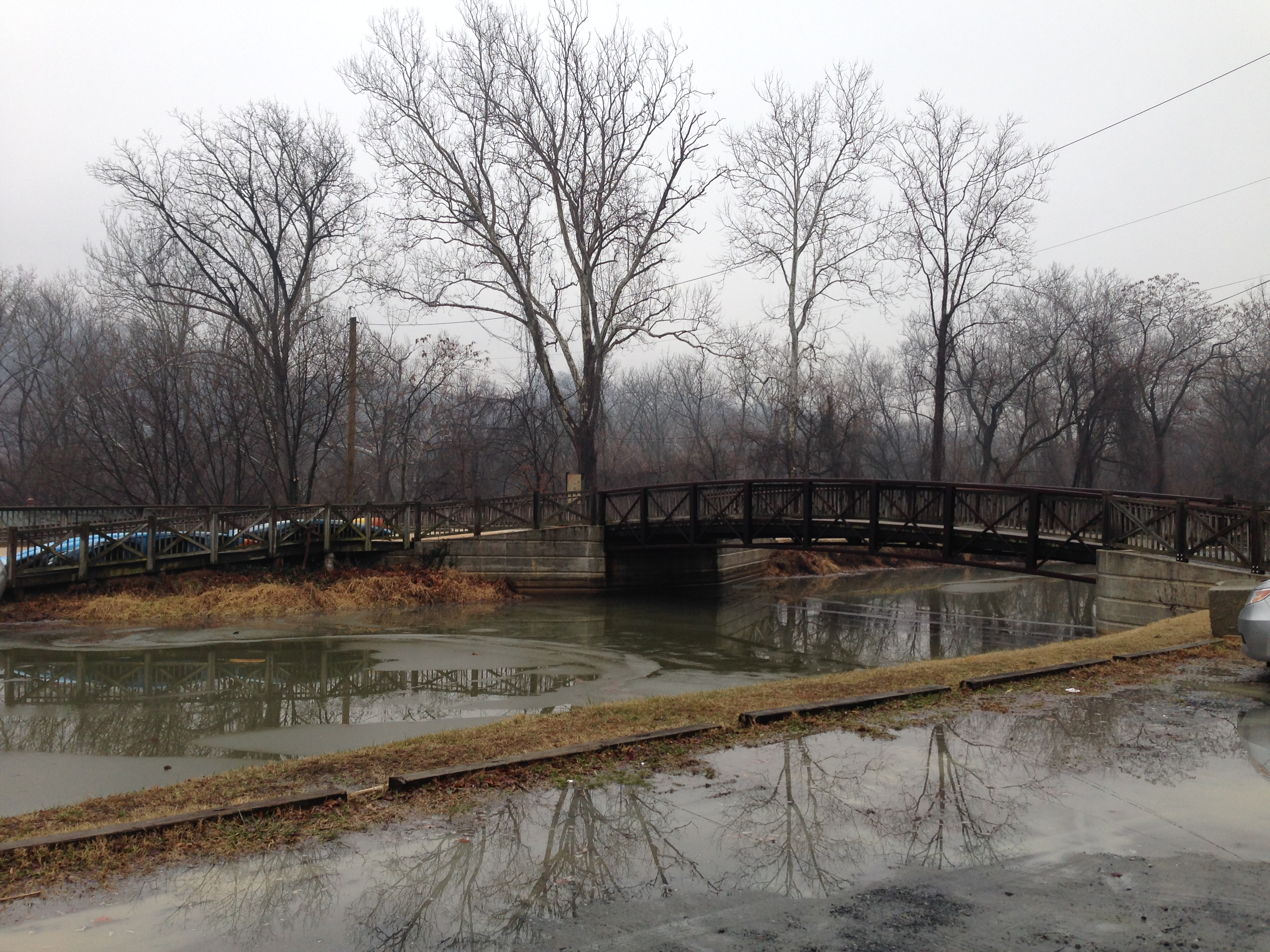
Fletcher's Cove in Washington DC, on the C&O Canal (2014)

Sometime before or after the American Civil War, the Fletcher family established a fishing and boat rental shop on a cove of the Potomac River upstream from the then-city limits of Washington, D.C., between the river and the Chesapeake and Ohio Canal. The nearby Abner Cloud House, built in 1802, is the oldest building on the canal.

The family ran the Fletcher's Boathouse for four generations. Proprietors included Julius Fletcher (1950-1978) and his Fletcher's sons, Ray and Joe (1979-2004). Ray and Joe operated the business under contract as a National Park Service concessionaire before retiring in 2004.

"Those spring runs are the heart of Fletcher's trade. Fishing starts in mid- to late-March, when hordes of white perch move upriver from deep holes downstream where they wintered. The perch, loaded with roe, seek fast, fresh water at the top of the tidal reach where their eggs hatch best. Next come shad and herring, bright from the sea and heavy with roe. Generations of Marylanders and Virginians have converged on the Potomac around Fletcher's each spring to dip-net herring and shad, extract the roe and salt-cure the flesh, though the practice has declined in the last 25 years. Finally, the river in late April and into May teems with spawning striped bass, locally known as rockfish, which attract another wave of anglers keen to catch a trophy up to 50 pounds", said Joe Fletcher in 2004.

Guest Services Incorporated took over the operations, which included the rental of boats and bicycles and the sale of bait and other fishing items. The area surrounding the boathouse was officially named Fletcher's Cove.
