= The Palisades (Washington, D.C.) =

Neighborhood in Washington, D.C.

- Neighborhood of Washington, D.C.
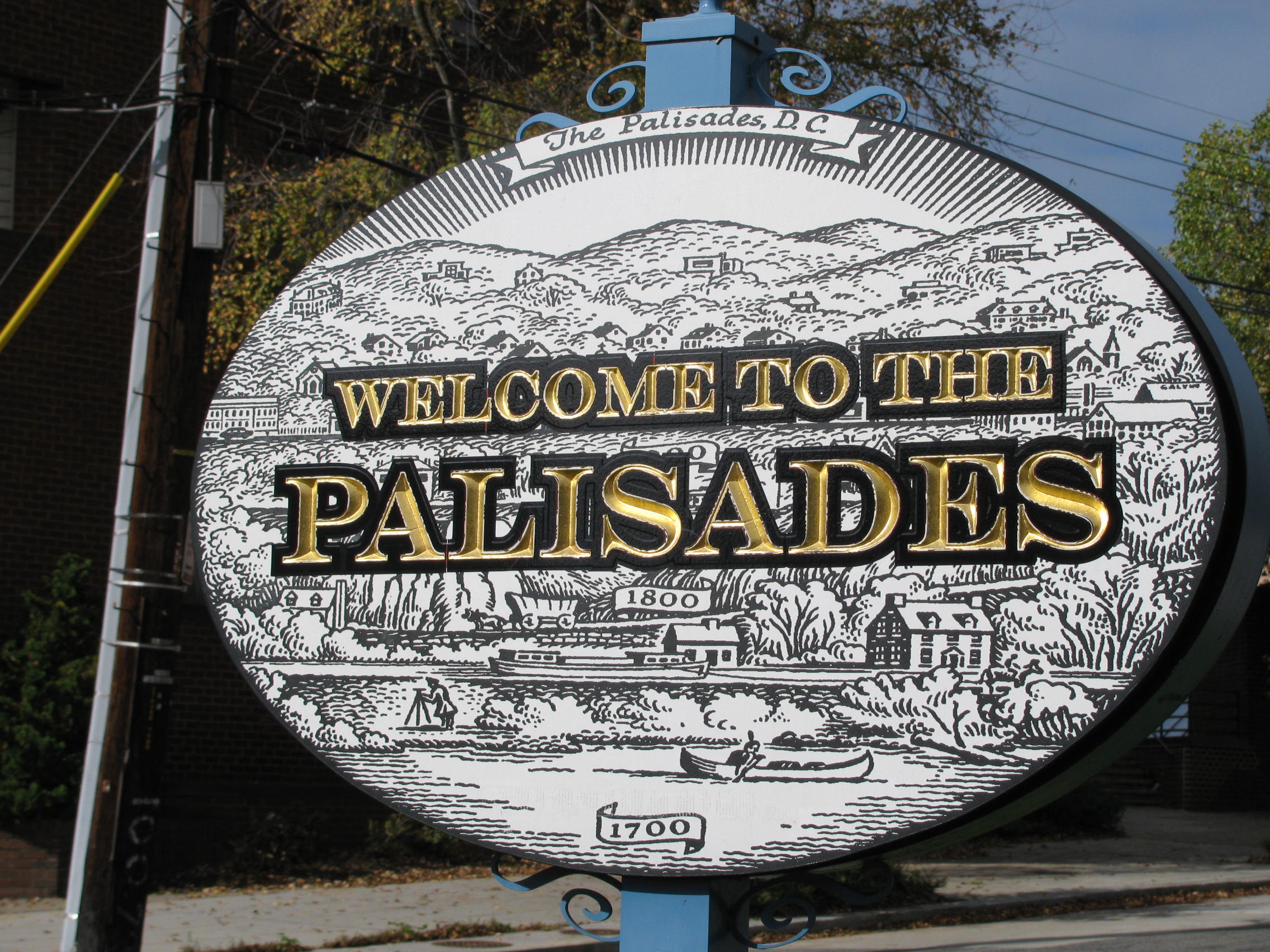
- Palisades sign (2011)

- Map of Washington, D.C., with The Palisades highlighted in red
- Coordinates: 38.9251°N 77.1014°W
- Country: United States
- District: Washington, D.C.
- Ward: Ward 3

Government
  - Councilmember: Matthew Frumin
- Postal code: ZIP code

The Palisades, or simply Palisades, is a neighborhood in Washington, D.C., along the Potomac River, running roughly from the edge of the Georgetown University campus (at Foxhall Road) to the D.C.-Maryland boundary (near Dalecarlia Treatment Plant).

MacArthur Boulevard (once called Conduit Road) is the main thoroughfare. The Palisades also includes the sub-neighborhood of Potomac Heights, which is bounded by MacArthur, Loughboro Road at the north end, Arizona Avenue at the south end, and the Potomac River.

== History ==
In 1792, boundary stone NW4 was placed at what is now the far northwestern edge of this neighborhood to mark the D.C.-Maryland line.

In 1893, this subdivision was laid out by the Palisades Improvement Company. Two years later, streetcar service arrived: the Washington and Great Falls Electric Railway connected the neighborhood to Georgetown and Glen Echo.

The International Athletic Park and Amusement Company secured a large block of the Palisades and constructed a Bicycle Track and General Amusement Park, which opened on Decoration Day in 1896.

In June 1909, the Potomac Heights Land Co. (based in North Carolina) acquired 75 acres (300,000 m^{2}) previously known as the Athletic Park tract at the reported cost of $1000 an acre. The tract extends parallel with and between Conduit Road and the Potomac. It is divided by the Washington Railway and Electric Company, which ran from Georgetown to Glen Echo for a 5 cent fare. There were 800 lots at $450–$500 per lot and no home was to be erected at less than $2500.

The Palisades is part of Advisory Neighborhood Commission 3D in Ward 3, the far northwest corner of the Northwest Quadrant just north of Georgetown. The current Palisades Community Association (PCA) was started as the Conduit Road Citizens Association in 1916.

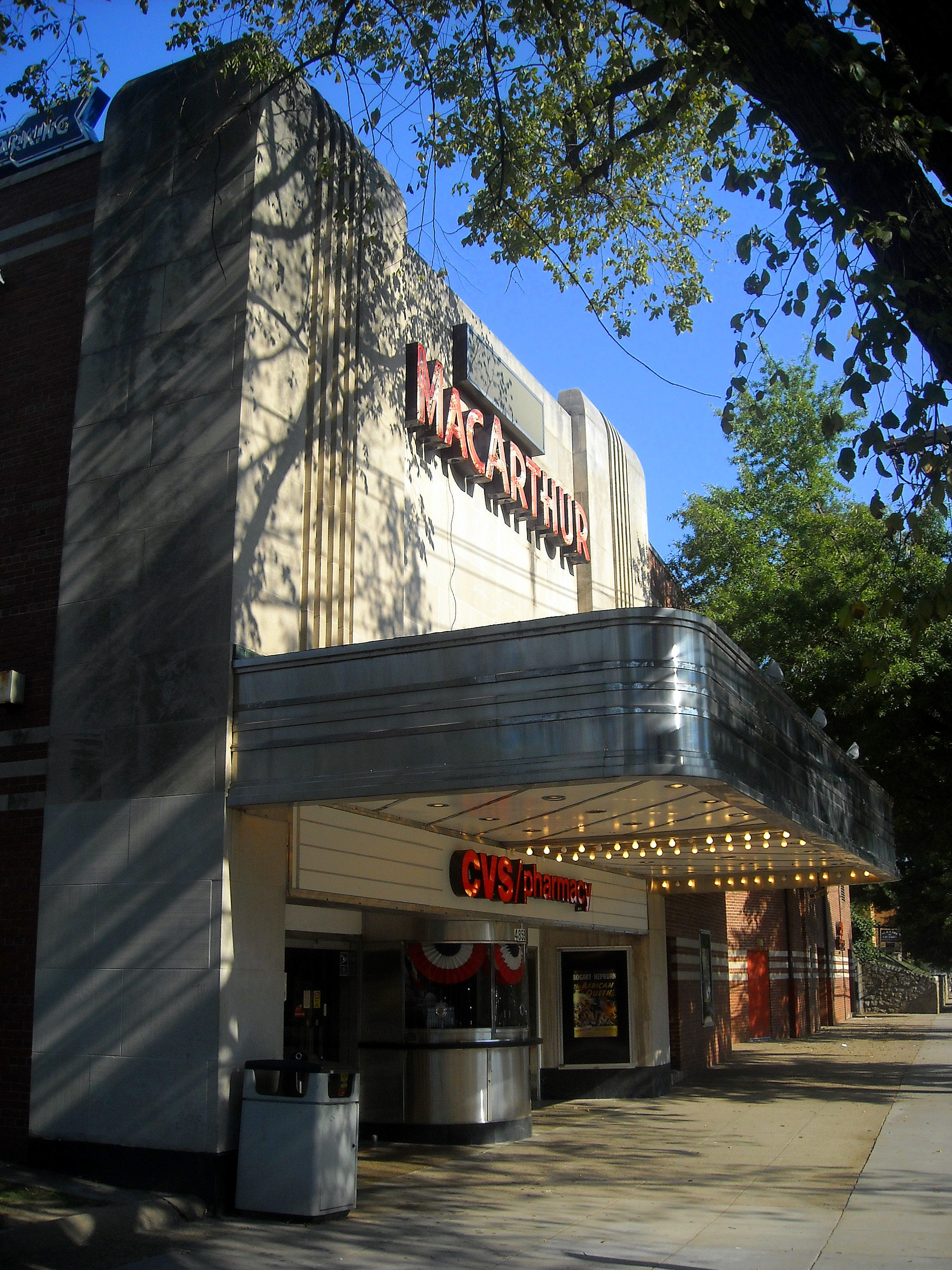
The old MacArthur Theater, now used as a CVS/pharmacy, in the Palisades

The Palisades is one of the lesser-known neighborhoods in Washington, with a mixture of detached houses, townhouses and apartments. The homes along the bluff on Potomac Avenue offer a broad view of the Potomac River and the Virginia riverfront, with often impressive sunset views.

Since 1928, the Palisades has been served by the Francis Scott Key Elementary School, which is part of the DC Public Schools. Extensive capital improvement of Key Elementary was completed in fall 2003. The renovated and expanded school currently enrolls 285 students and will gradually increase to approximately 300.

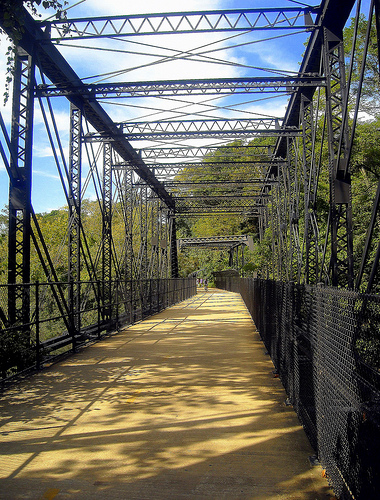
Arizona Avenue Railway Bridge, part of the Capital Crescent Trail, crosses the C&O Canal in the Palisades

The current Palisades Neighborhood Library opened in 1964 and was renovated in 2018.

Battery Kemble was at an elevation on Ridge Road (now Nebraska Avenue). The battery held two 100-pounder Parrott rifles, placed to sweep Chain Bridge and Virginia beyond. The site is located within Battery Kemble Park, bounded by Chain Bridge Road, MacArthur Boulevard, 49th Street, and Nebraska Avenue, NW.

Fletcher's Cove is on the Potomac River and the C & O Canal National Historical Park, between Chain and Key Bridges. Fletcher's has been in this location since the 1850s and is renowned as a superb fishing and recreational area. The nearby Abner Cloud House is the oldest building on the canal, dating back to 1802. After 145 years of business, the fourth generation of Fletchers retired in 2004 and Guest Services Incorporated, a National Park Service concessionaire, assumed responsibility for the operation of the concessions. The area surrounding the boat house was then officially named Fletcher's Cove, though most people still call it Fletcher's Boat House.

Other notable landmarks making the Palisades unique are the old Conduit Road Schoolhouse on MacArthur Boulevard, Palisades Community Church (1923), The Lab School of Washington (1967) (formerly the Florence Crittenton Home for Unwed Mothers), the German Embassy, St. David's Episcopal Church (1940), Sibley Hospital (1961) and Gen. Montgomery C. Meig's Washington Aqueduct / Dalecarlia Filtration / Water Treatment Plant (1853).

Remnants are everywhere of the old Capitol Transit #20 trolley (Union Station to Cabin John) that was a very popular ride through the Palisades out to the Glen Echo Amusement Park (1898–1968). In addition, the Georgetown Branch of the B & O railroad once worked its way through The Palisades, the most notable landmark being the steel trestle bridge over Arizona Ave. Since the Georgetown Branch's abandonment in 1985, it has been part of the Capital Crescent Trail.

The Palisades Firehouse (Engine Company 29), at 4811 MacArthur Blvd. NW, built in 1925 is listed on the National Register of Historic Places. It was designed by architect Albert L. Harris in Colonial Revival style.

Also National Register-listed are:

- Conduit Road Schoolhouse
- Dr. Franklin E. Kameny House, home of gay rights leader
- Northwest No. 4 Boundary Marker of the Original District of Columbia
- Washington Aqueduct.

Designed by John J. Zink, the MacArthur Theater, originally a single 1,000 seater that was tri-plexed in 1982, was in use from December 1946 through March 1997.

On September 11, 1936, at a cost of $40,000, the Palisades Playground and field house was dedicated at its current Sherier and Edmunds Place location.

A high point of the year for many in the neighborhood is the annual July 4 parade, featuring local bands, fire engines and children on highly decorated tricycles and bicycles.

== MacArthur Boulevard ==
Conduit Road was first created by Congress in 1852 when they authorized the construction of the Washington Aqueduct to provide water for the city. Construction was overseen by Lieutenant Meigs of the Army Core of Engineers, the same man who oversaw construction of the Capital Dome.

In 1942, while the Second World War was still raging; Congress renamed Conduit Road after General MacArthur who was actively engaging in a fighting retreat in the Philippines. When the bill to rename the road was introduced the General was withdrawing his men to Corregidor, when the General arrived in Australia the street had been renamed in his honor.

The general was no stranger to dealing with Congress or Washinton. In 1932 General MacArthur had led the forces which routed the Bonus Army from the steps of the capital. The army of Great War veterans, suffering from the effects of the depression, had marched on Washington to demand early payment of their veteran's bonuses from the Hoover administration. MacArthur fired on the veterans and forced them into a retreat.

== Education ==
District of Columbia Public Schools operates public schools. Mann Elementary School, Key Elementary School, Hardy Middle School, and Jackson-Reed High School serve Palisades.

Private schools in Palisades include Our Lady of Victory Catholic School, the Lab School, the River School, and St. Patrick's Episcopal Day School.

District of Columbia Public Library operates the Palisades Neighborhood Library.
