= Reid Temple A.M.E. Church =

Coordinates: 38°59′4.7″N 76°48′32″W

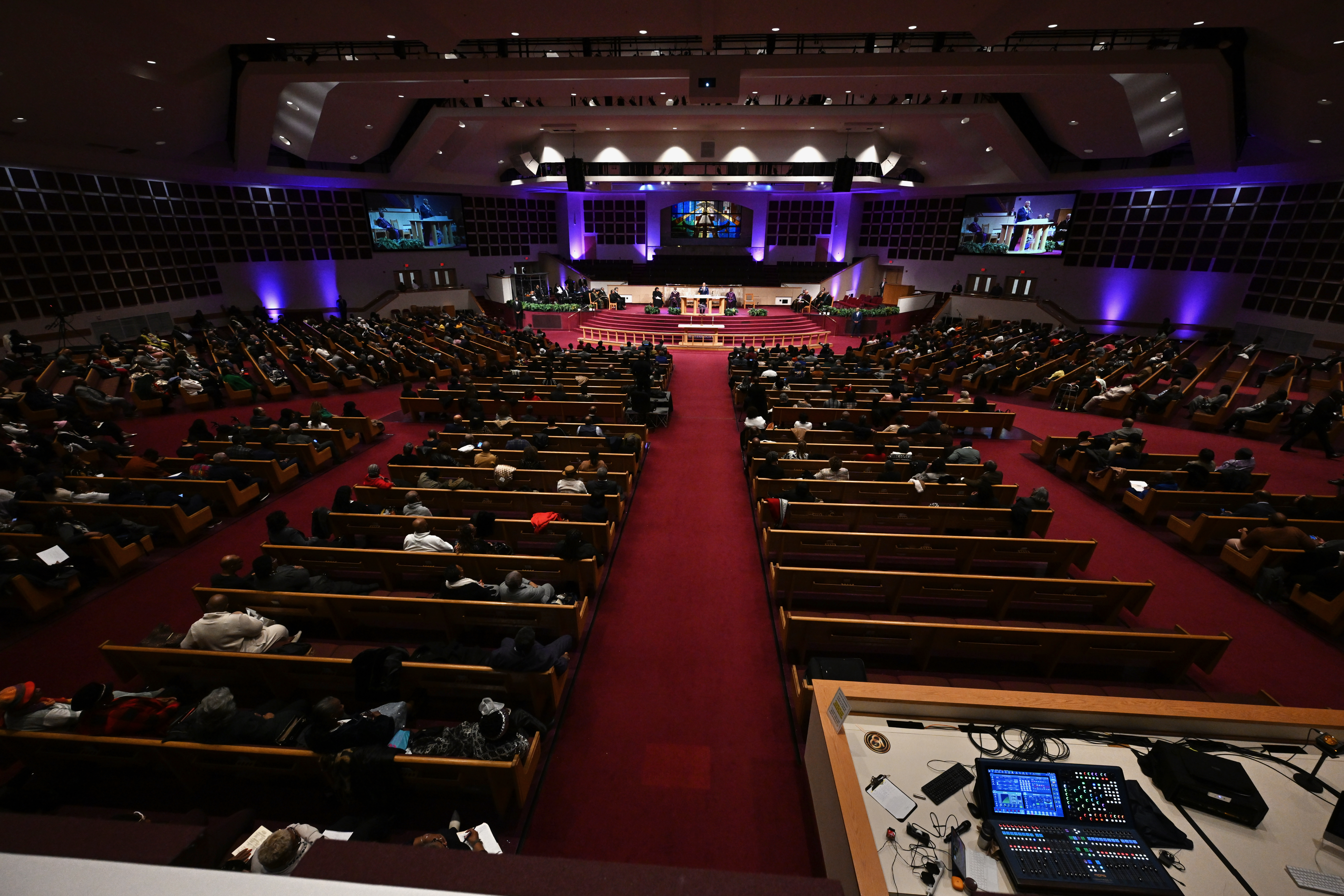
- The interior of Reid Temple in February 2026
- Reid Temple A.M.E. Church
- Country: USA
- Denomination: African Methodist Episcopal
- Website: http://www.reidtemple.org

History
- Founded: 1816

The Reid Temple A.M.E. Church is an African Methodist Episcopal megachurch located in Glenn Dale, Maryland, USA to the northeast of Washington, DC. In 2008, Outreach Magazine reported that attendance was 7,500, making it the 88th largest church in the US at that time. Reid Temple is located in Glenn Dale, Maryland with a membership of well over 9,000 persons.

== Background ==
The parent AME Church is a Methodist denomination founded by the Rev. Richard Allen, Absalom Jones, and others established in Philadelphia in 1816. The AME Church now has over 2,000,000 members in North and South America, Africa and Europe, and includes other major churches such as the First A.M.E. Church of Los Angeles with over 19,000 members and the Greater Allen A. M. E. Cathedral of New York with over 23,000 members.

The Reid Temple A.M.E. Church has its origins in the former Dent Chapel of Bladensburg, Maryland, purchased in 1900 from the Methodist Episcopal Church and named for its first pastor, Reverend Abraham Dent. The Dent Chapel was severely damaged by flooding in the late 1950s and the congregation was forced to find a new location. The new Reid Temple A.M.E. Church was opened on October 4, 1964, on Michigan Avenue, NE in Washington, DC, initially burdened with debt and with limited facilities. These problems were overcome, and with a congregation that had grown to 300 members. Reid Temple relocated to Good Luck Road in Lanham, Maryland in January 1989.

== Today ==
The Senior Pastor of Reid Temple is Rev. Dr. Mark E. Whitlock, Jr., who was appointed on July 11, 2019, by Bishop James L. Davis following the retirement of Senior Pastor Emeritus Rev. Dr. Lee P. Washington.

Reid Temple AME Church is a Bible-believing, Christ-centered, Family-integrated, Multigenerational, and Culturally aware church, spreading the gospel of Jesus Christ while “Building the Beloved Community.” The mission of Reid Temple AME Church is to increase and grow our ministry for the spiritual, social, and physical development of all people.

The Glenn Dale worship center has a seating capacity of 3,000 with music involving a 300-member choir and a band featuring electric guitars, an organ, and drums. The center has carefully designed acoustics, alongside modern sound and video projection systems. The multigenerational choirs are observed to provide a stirring accompaniment to the preaching and prayers.

The church includes the on-campus Reid Temple Christian Academy, teaching up to Grade 8. Reid Temple awards annually over $150,000 in scholarships to various high school graduates and others that are continuing education to help them in their college and university education. The affiliated Reid Community Development Corporation provides programs and resources to assist socially and economically disadvantaged residents of the area. In 2018, the Reid Temple Bible College opened its doors. Reid Temple Senior Services is a Christian-based non-profit 501(c)(3) organization created to inspire and nurture the human spirit of our seniors; to generate happiness, strengthen values, and make a difference through activities, fellowship, and experiences.

== See also ==
- List of the largest churches in the USA
