= Albert L. Harris =

American architect (1869–1933)

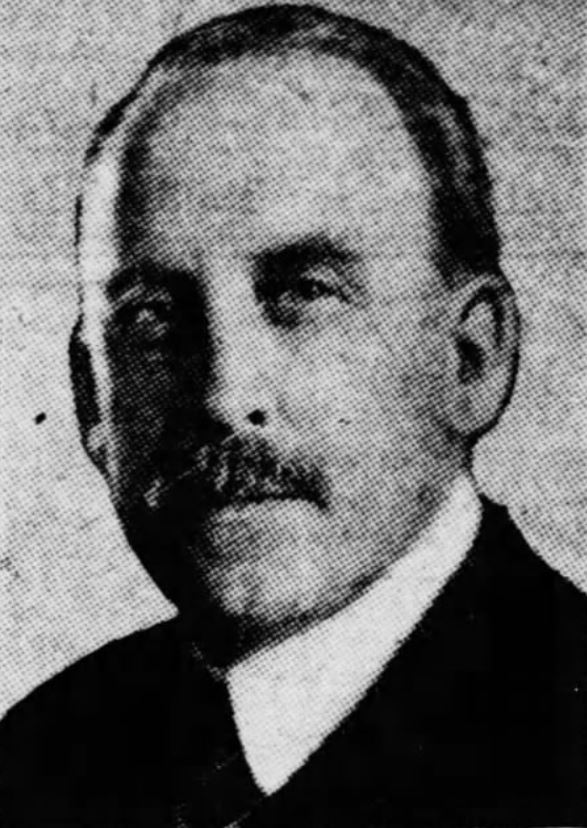
- Born: 1869; Abergynolwyn, Wales
- Died: February 24, 1933 (aged 63–64); Washington, D.C.
- Citizenship: American
- Office: Municipal Architect of Washington, D.C.
- Term: 1921–1933
- Children: 2

Albert L. Harris (1869 – February 24, 1933) was an American architect who worked primarily in Washington, D.C. He was born in Wales and emigrated to the United States as a young child. He worked for architectural firms in Chicago and Baltimore and then Washington, where he also obtained an architectural degree from George Washington University. He was a part-time professor there while also working for the US Navy and then the city of Washington where he served as the city's Municipal Architect from 1921 until his death in 1933. A number of his works are listed on the National Register of Historic Places (NRHP).

== Background and early career ==
Harris was born in Abergynolwyn, Wales, in 1869. Leaving Wales in 1873 with his father for the United States, Harris was next known to be in the Washington, D.C., area in 1890 when he was enrolled in the Arlington Academy, a private secondary school. He left the academy without graduating in 1893 and moved to Chicago, to design residential buildings under Henry Ives Cobb. He was in charge of drafting for two years at E.T. Harris Ornamental Works. After five years in Chicago, he next worked for Wyatt & Nolting in Baltimore before returning to Washington in 1900.

== Washington career ==
Harris designed firehouses and apartment buildings with Leon E. Dessez and supervised the interior design of the Baltimore city courthouse. He was employed in Washington as a draftsman with Hornblower & Marshall for twelve years. During this time, he worked on the Baltimore Custom House and the National Museum of Natural History, the National Geographic Building, (Note: This may have been Hubbard Memorial Hall at 1156 16th Street, built in 1902 as the headquarters of the National Geographic Society and designed by Hornblower & Marshall or the 1913 expansion, credited to Arthur B. Heaton that was called the National Geographic Building. Both are contributing properties of the Sixteenth Street Historic District.) the US Marine Barracks, (Note: Hornblower & Marshall designed the new barracks building, the band hall, and likely the officer's quarters (five detached houses) which were all constructed from 1903 to 1907.) and the George Washington University Hospital. (Note: A 1904 building on H Street NW between 13th & 14th Streets. The hospital moved to a new building near Washington Circle on 23rd Street NW in 1949, approximately a mile west, and to a newer building across the street in 2012. The medical school utilized the building until 1973. It has since been razed and replaced with a 12-story office building that was completed in 1982.) He worked another seven years for Hornblower & Marshall as a junior architect and supervised the construction of the Army and Navy Club. He was made a partner in the firm in 1911.

He completed a B.S. degree in architecture at George Washington University (GWU) in 1912. Upon graduation, he became an assistant professor of architecture there, and a full professor in 1915. He remained in that role part-time until 1930.

Just before the US entered World War I, he was tasked to supervise the construction of Washington's central heating plant by the Secretary of the Treasury, which at that time directed the construction of Federal facilities. During the war, he was appointed draftsman at the Bureau of Yards and Docks, a branch of the US Navy, from 1917 to 1919, where he wrote design specifications for Navy aviation, ordnance, and submarine bases. At the end of his war service in October 1919, he continued teaching and entered private practice.

He then went to work for the Office of the Municipal Architect of Washington in 1920, (Note: One source says he did not join the office until being appointed its chief in 1921) and succeeded Snowden Ashford as the city's second municipal architect in April 1921. He was selected by the city commissioners from six candidates, and was one of two who were endorsed for the position by the Washington chapter of the AIA.

He partnered with Arthur B. Heaton in 1924 on the design of a quadrangular plan for the GWU campus and two academic buildings there, Corcoran Hall and Stockton Hall, both listed on the National Register of Historic Places.

=== Schools ===
Much of his work with the city involved the design of schools. The Washington Commission of Fine Arts suggested that the Colonial Revival style was appropriate for municipal buildings in the city's residential neighborhoods and the majority of his schools and other buildings, such as firehouses, were done in that style. This contrasted the Federal style of the national government buildings in the city's core. One exception was a 1931 addition to the Park View School, designed in 1916 by Snowden Ashford, where Harris followed the original Gothic Revival style.

During Harris's tenure, the school age population of the district was increasing rapidly. The city had an aggressive "Five Year Building Program" in the 1920s to deal with the growth in the neighborhoods. Harris developed a plan for "extensible" schools, that is, schools that were planned in whole but constructed in phases to match the demand for space and the available funding, avoiding awkward additions on to buildings that were not originally envisioned. For example, the Janney Elementary School was constructed in 1925 with the main core containing a library and administrative space, an academic east wing, and a gymnasium and auditorium in the rear. Seven years later, the west wing was added to complete the building as Harris had originally designed it.

His extensible school plan included a Colonial Revival rectangular plan, like Janney, the same layout executed in the Renaissance Revival style, and a U-shaped plan. Each of the block layouts was used three times.

=== Park buildings ===
Harris adapted the Colonial style to field houses at city parks, although less formally than the style of his schools since he considered recreations a less formal activity, and the 1 1/2-story building were much smaller than schools. The style for these structures resembled Colonial hall-and-parlor houses of the 1700s. This plan was used six times, including the Twin Oaks Playground and Field House, which is listed on the NRHP and the Mitchell Park Field House, a District of Columbia Inventory of Historic Site and as of 2019, submitted for listing on the NRHP. For inspiration in the design of the Reptile House at the Washington Zoo, Harris traveled with zoo superintendent William Mann to Europe in 1912 to study similar buildings in major cities there, including London, Paris, Vienna, and Berlin. He also planned to look at concepts in general municipal design.

=== Judiciary Square ===
Beginning in 1926, he began planning for buildings at Judiciary Square. However, years of trouble slowed Harris's plans as numerous battles with the federal government and Commission of Fine Arts erupted over various issues, including funding and cost, the specific site of buildings. the architectural relationship with nearby Federal Triangle and the Mall, the specific location of courts and offices, the number of buildings, the demolition of neighborhood buildings, and especially the financial difficulties and priorities of the Great Depression. Along with his staff at the Office of the Municipal Architect, Harris continued to work through these issues and design the campus, until he died suddenly in February 1933. Upon his death, Nathan C. Wyeth became Municipal Architect and continued the planning. Construction of the District of Columbia Municipal Center began in 1938 and was completed in 1941.

== Death ==
Harris died suddenly on February 24, 1933, in his home from a heart attack. The first symptoms developed the night before. He was buried in Washington's Glenwood Cemetery.

== Praise ==
Harris was said to have an "excellent working relationship" with the Fine Arts Commission, due to his willingness to design buildings in their preferred Colonial Revival style. His predecessor, Snowden Ashford, had preferred Gothic Revival and Elizabethan. The commission, however, was committed to the aesthetic as defined by the McMillan Commission's 1902 plan for the city and publicly opposed Ashford's designs.

After his death, the commission noted that Harris was responsible for "consistently high standards for the design of municipal buildings in D.C., including schoolhouses, fire and police stations, and gas stations". The Washington AIA chapter "praised Albert Harris for his plans for Washington’s public schools." They also praised his willingness to utilize private architects, primarily for elementary schools, to augment the city staff during the construction boom in the 1920.

A week after his death, the Washington Board of Education said:

The efficient development of the school buildings of Washington is due to the splendid services rendered by Mr. Harris during the time he served as municipal architect. A high standard has been achieved, both in plan and design, with the result that the Washington school buildings are equaled by few and excelled by none. The sympathetic attitude displayed by Mr. Harris together with sound advice, has been of great assistance to the Board of Education. The schools erected will be a lasting monument to his ability and genius.

At the same time, the board voted to consider the name "Albert L. Harris" for a new school in the "near future".

== AIA ==
Harris was a long time member of the Washington Chapter of the American Institute of Architects. In 1911, an AIA committee of Harris, Snowden Ashford, and Waddy B. Wood "condemned bay windows as not being in accord with the dignity of architecture which the Capital should maintain." In 1914, another committee of the three, and Glenn Brown first proposed that architects be professionally licensed. Harris himself became the first licensed architect in Washington on April 6, 1925.

== Works ==
=== As draftsman/junior architect ===
While employed by Hornblower & Marshall, he was involved with the following projects:

- Baltimore Custom House (1903-1907)
- National Museum of Natural History (1903-1911)
- National Geographic Building (1902 or 1913)
- George Washington University Hospital (1904)
- US Marine Barracks (1903-1907)
- Army and Navy Club (1912) (supervised construction)

=== As Washington Municipal Architect ===
From 1921 to 1933, Harris is credited as architect of the following municipal structures:

=== In Washington ===
- Chain Bridge Road School (1923), 2820 Chain Bridge Rd., NRHP-listed
- Corcoran Hall (1924) and Stockton Hall (1926) on University Yard at the George Washington University
- Engine Company 16-Truck Company 3 (1932), 1018 13th St., N.W., NRHP-listed
- Engine Company 29 (1925), 4811 MacArthur Blvd. NW, NRHP-listed

According to the DC Office of Planning, the design of Engine Company 29 "is among the most successful of Municipal Architect Albert Harris."

- Engine Company 31 (1931), 4930 Connecticut Ave., NW, NRHP-listed
- Janney Elementary School (1925), 4130 Albemarle St, NW, NRHP-listed
- McKinley High School (1926), 151 T Street NE
- Blanche Kelso Bruce Elementary School (1927), Colonial Revival-style annex, NRHP-listed
- Lafayette Elementary School (1931), 5701 Broad Branch Rd. NW, NRHP-listed
- Lincoln Playground Field House (1934), listed on the District of Columbia Inventory of Historic Sites
- MacFarland Junior High School (1925), 4400 Iowa Ave NW, NRHP-listed
- Mitchell Park Field House (1931), 1801 23rd Street NW, listed on the District of Columbia Inventory of Historic Sites and as of 2019, submitted for listing on the NRHP.
- Park View Playground and Field House (1932), NRHP-listed
- Roosevelt High School (1932), 4301 13th Street NW
- Twin Oaks Playground and Field House (1934), 4025 14th Street NW, NRHP-listed in 2020
- Woodrow Wilson High School (1935), 3950 Chesapeake St, NW, NRHP-listed
- Bird House and Reptile and Amphibian House of the Washington Zoo
- District of Columbia Municipal Center, (early planning, up to Harris's death in 1934), later known as the Henry Daly Building, NRHP-listed

=== Elsewhere ===
- Glenn Dale Tuberculosis Hospital and Sanatorium (1931), 5201 Glenn Dale Rd., Glenn Dale, Maryland, NRHP-listed (Note: Built by Washington on a site twelve miles (19 km) away in Maryland for the treatment of children in Washington with tuberculosis. The first two buildings in the campus were built in 1933, the Children's Hospital Building/Peabody Hall/Building 7 and the Children's Nurses Dormitory/Capper Hall/Building 6 are credited to staff architect Lawrence P. Johnston with Harris supervising.)
- D.C. Workhouse and Reformatory Historic District, Lorton, Virginia, NRHP-listed (Note: This prison complex was established in 1910 for inmates from Washington about 20 miles (32 km) southwest of the city. Snowden Ashford began plans for the Reformatory complex (multiple buildings). Harris completed the design, and designed the Workhouse and Penitentiary buildings.)
