= Engine Company 29 =

- U.S. National Register of Historic Places
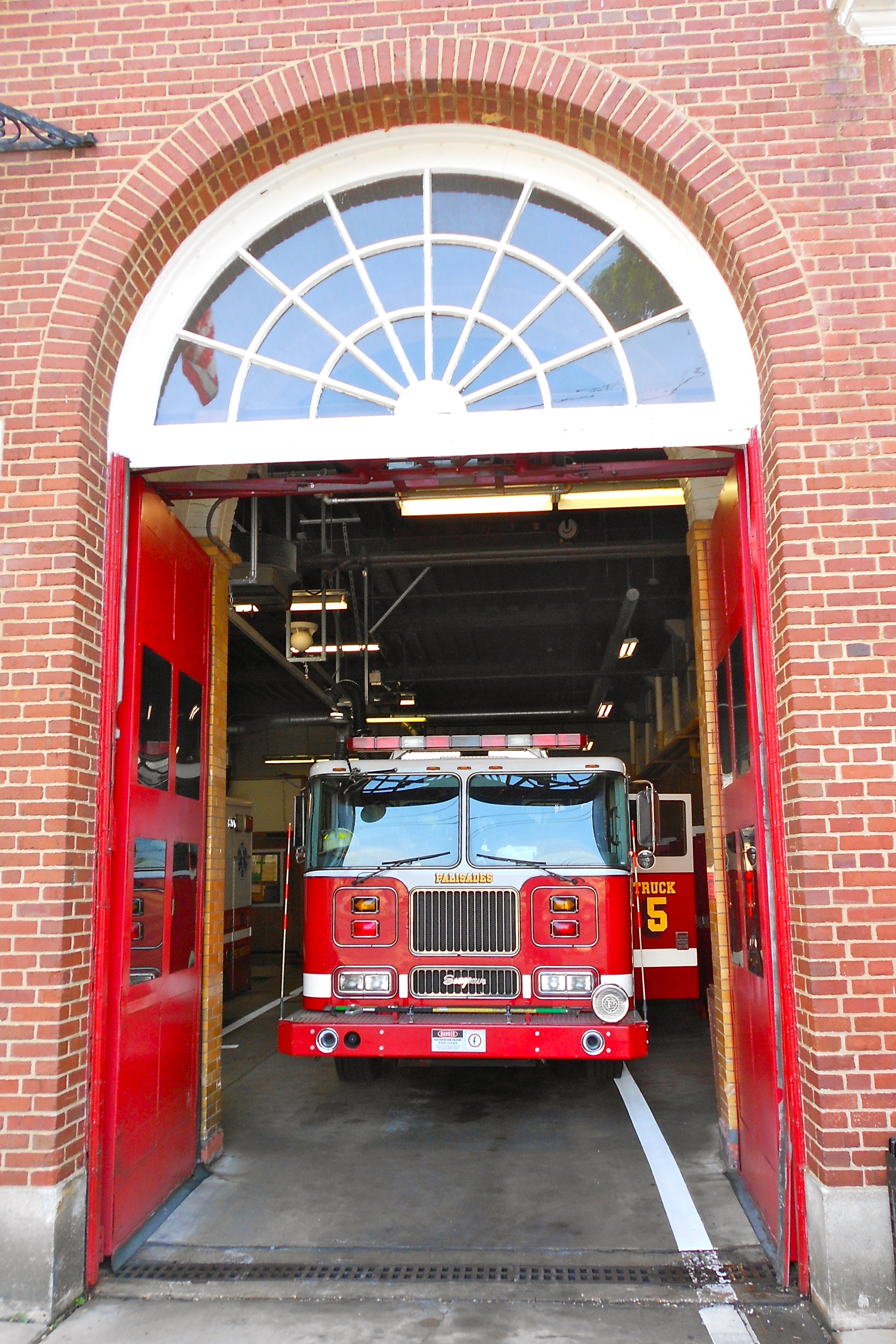
- Engine Company 29 in 2012

- Location within District of Columbia
- Location: 4811 MacArthur Blvd. NW, Washington, District of Columbia
- Coordinates: 38.915555°N 77.093536°W
- Area: less than one acre
- Built: 1925
- Architect: Albert L. Harris
- Architectural style: Colonial Revival
- MPS: Firehouses in Washington DC MPS
- NRHP reference No.: 07000534
- Added to NRHP: June 6, 2007

Engine Company 29, at 4811 MacArthur Blvd. NW in Washington, D.C., is a fire station built in 1925. It was listed on the National Register of Historic Places in 2007.

It was designed by architect Albert L. Harris in Colonial Revival style.

It has also been known as the Palisades Firehouse and as Engine Company No. 29.

It was designated a Washington, D.C. historic designation on July 22, 2004. According to the DC Office of Planning,

The Palisades firehouse was the city’s first one-story firehouse, and one of two prototype Colonial Revival firehouses dating from 1925. In that year, the fire department completed its conversion to all-motorized apparatus, enabling a more rapid response and necessitating fewer firehouses overall. But facilities grew larger, and in outlying suburban areas, more land was available to spread the stations over a more convenient single floor. The design is among the most successful of Municipal Architect Albert Harris. Following neo-Georgian principles, the main block of the front-gabled brick building is symmetrically composed, but the dormitories are placed to the side in a secondary wing, creating a T-shaped plan. A majestic four-story hose tower rises at the rear, balancing the design and creating a conspicuous neighborhood landmark.

The department's Robert “Bob” Marshall "loved firefighting so much" that he commuted 80 miles to work there, before he was killed in a non-work-related accident in 2018.

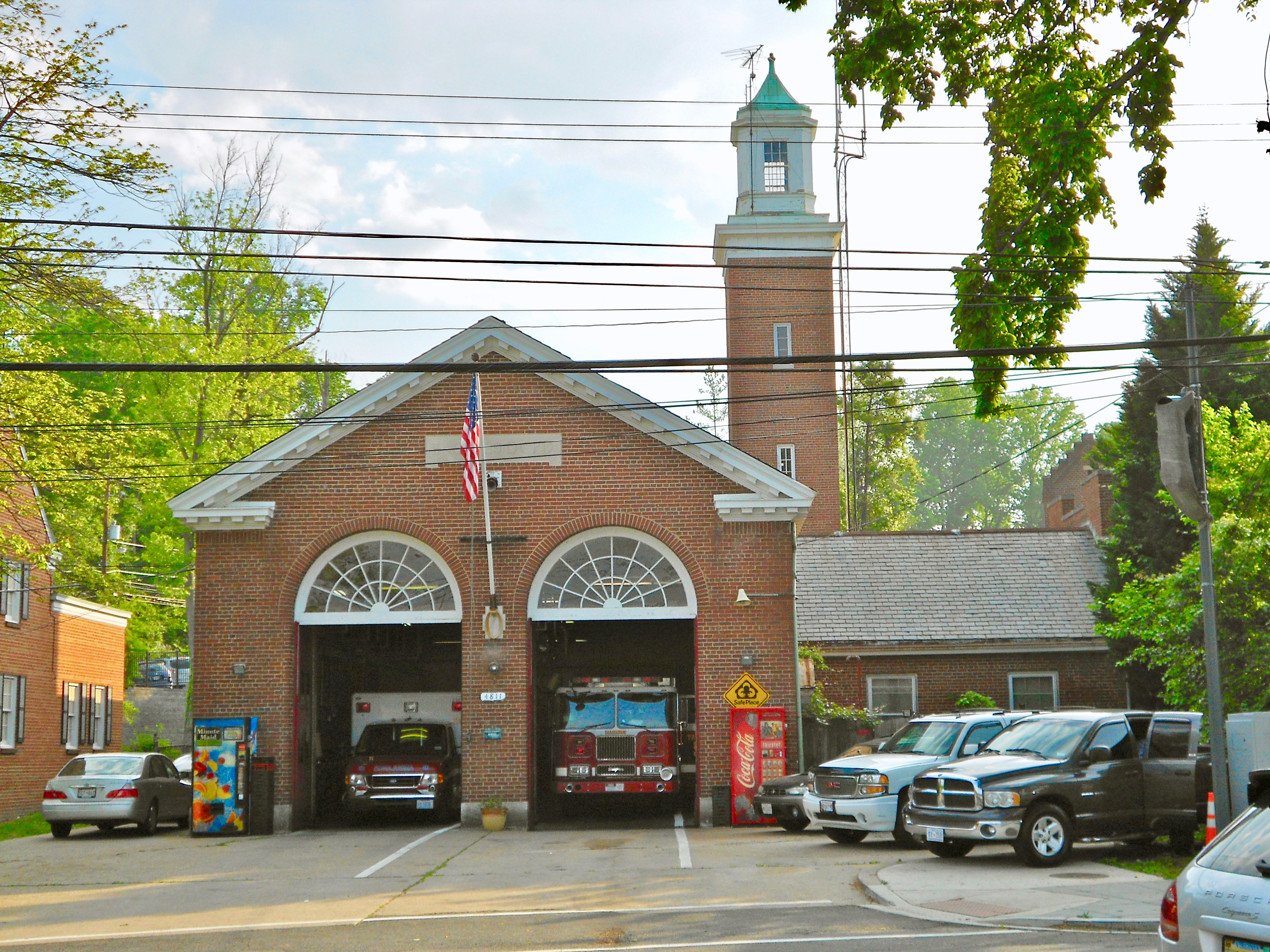
in 2012
