= Cecil Murray =

American theologian (1929–2024)

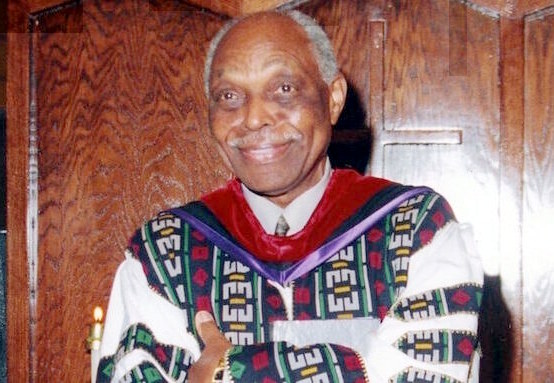
- Born: September 26, 1929; Lakeland, Florida, U.S.
- Died: April 5, 2024 (aged 94); Los Angeles, California, U.S.
- Education: Florida A&M University; Claremont School of Theology (PhD)
- Spouse: Lois Bernadine Cousin (m. 1958; died 2013)
- Children: 1

Cecil Leonard "Chip" Murray (September 26, 1929 – April 5, 2024) was an American theologian.

== Early life ==
Murray was born in Lakeland, Florida, the second child of Janie Williams and Robert Murray. After his mother died when he was three years old, Murray's father moved Cecil and his two siblings to West Palm Beach, Florida. There, his father became a principal of a local high school and remarried. During his middle and high school years, Murray became a junior preacher at his church, Payne Chapel African Methodist Episcopal (AME). As a teenager, he and his brother Edward witnessed his father confront three white men who were harassing Black people waiting at a soup kitchen. In response, the white men attacked their father then Cecil and Edward. After the incident, Murray's father made a blood oath covenant with his sons, swearing that they would always love and defend Black people.

== Early career ==
Murray received a degree in history at Florida A&M University in 1951. As a student there, he worked for the school newspaper and joined Alpha Phi Alpha, the oldest Black fraternity in the United States. After graduating college, he joined the Air Force, and stayed there for about a decade, working as a radar intercept officer and a navigator. In 1958, when he was stationed at Oxnard Air Force Base, situated northwest of Los Angeles, his fighter jet crashed on takeoff, pinning Murray in the back of the plane. Although the pilot, a white man from South Carolina, was able to rescue Murray, he fell into the burning gasoline, suffering fatal third-degree burns. Despite Murray's best efforts to smother the flames, the pilot died shortly thereafter. Murray then visited the pilot in the hospital before he died; later saying said that this incident "made [him] know that [he] had to live beyond [himself]". As a result of this incident, Murray was awarded the Soldier's Medal of Valor.

== Later life ==
After leaving the Air Force in 1961, (Note: Some sources like Variety and NBC report that Murray retired from the Air Force in 1958.) Murray studied divinity at Claremont School of Theology, receiving his doctorate in religion there in 1964. He started preaching at Primm African Methodist Episcopal church in Pomona and later preached at AME Churches in Kansas City and Seattle. In 1977, Murray became the pastor of the First African Methodist Episcopal Church of Los Angeles, the oldest black congregation in Los Angeles. As the church grew, it was able to repay debts and attracted prominent figures such as Los Angeles mayor Tom Bradley. Although Murray became a respected religious leader, other ministers envied the funding and attention he received, occasionally receiving death threats.

After his retirement in 2004, he was later the John R. Tansey Chair Professor in the department of Christian ethics at University of Southern California until his retirement in 2022.

== Death ==
Murray died of natural causes in Los Angeles, California on April 5, 2024, at the age of 94.
