= Conduit Road Schoolhouse =

- U.S. National Register of Historic Places
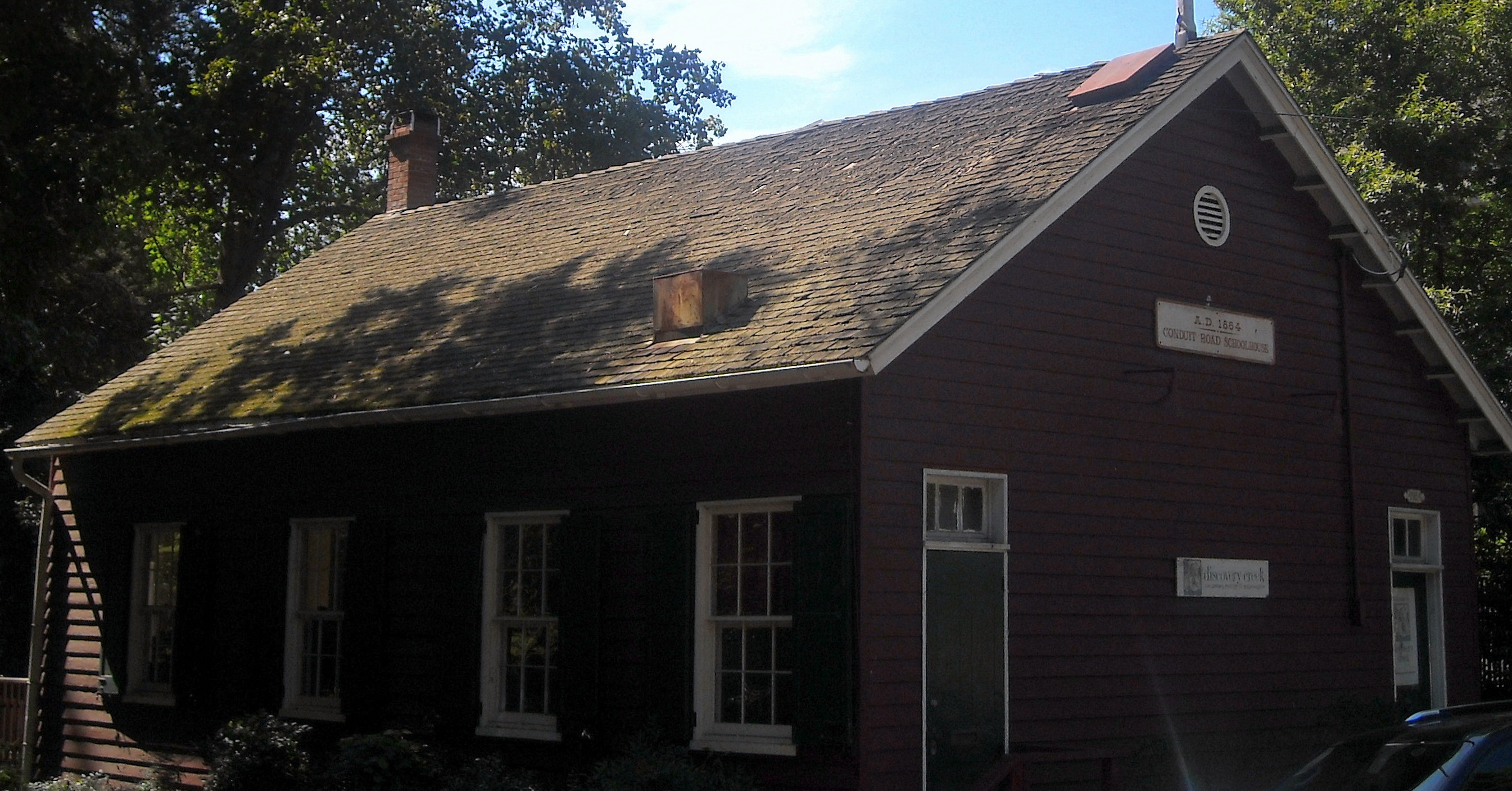
- Conduit Road Schoolhouse in 2008

- Location within District of Columbia
- Location: 4954 MacArthur Boulevard, NW; Washington, D.C.
- Coordinates: 38°55′17″N 77°5′59″W
- Area: less than one acre
- Built: 1874
- Architectural style: vernacular
- NRHP reference No.: 73000220
- Added to NRHP: November 30, 1973

The Conduit Road Schoolhouse is a historic school, located at 4954 MacArthur Boulevard, Northwest, Washington, D.C., in the Palisades neighborhood.

== History ==
It was built as a one-room schoolhouse on Conduit Road. It replaced a school of 1864, which burned down. It closed in 1928, and served as a branch of the public library. In 1965, it was saved for use as the Children's Museum.

== See also ==
- National Register of Historic Places listings in the District of Columbia
