= Glenn Dale Hospital =

Geography
- Location: Glenn Dale, Maryland, United States

Organization
- Type: Specialist

Services
- Speciality: Tuberculosis hospital and Sanatorium

History
- Opened: after 1934
- Closed: 1981

Links
- Lists: Hospitals in Maryland
- Glenn Dale Tuberculosis Hospital and Sanatorium
- U.S. National Register of Historic Places
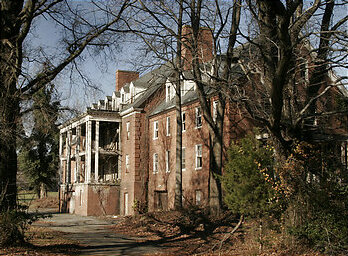
- The Glenn Dale Hospital

- Location within Maryland Location within the United States
- Location: 5201 Glenn Dale Rd., Glenn Dale, Maryland
- Coordinates: 38°57′39″N 76°48′48″W
- Area: 206.11 acres (0.8341 km^{2})
- Built: 1934
- Architect: Albert L. Harris; Nathan C. Wyeth; Lawrence Johnston; Merrel C. Coe
- Architectural style: Colonial Revival
- NRHP reference No.: 11000822
- Added to NRHP: November 18, 2011

Glenn Dale Hospital was a tuberculosis sanatorium and isolation hospital in Glenn Dale, Maryland, in the United States. It is a large facility, consisting of 23 buildings on 216 acres (87 ha), that was built in 1934 and closed in 1981 due to asbestos.

Though it is now closed and may be eventually demolished, for decades it was an important public health institution near Washington, DC. The Maryland-National Capital Park and Planning Commission Park Police patrol the hospital grounds regularly.

== Grounds ==
The hospital grounds consist of several buildings:

1. Children's Nurses' Home
2. Children's Hospital Building
3. Residence "D" Dormitory
4. Building "C" Nurses' Home
5. Building "F" Duplex House
6. Building "D" Doctor's House
7. Building "G" Duplex House (Superintendent's Residence)
8. Building "E" Doctor's House
9. Adult Hospital Building
10. Warehouse and Mechanics Garage
11. Heating and Power Plant
12. Sludge Bed Enclosure
13. Sedimentation and Control Building
14. Water Softener House
15. Pump House
16. Employee Building
17. Laundry
18. Residence "C" Dormitory
19. Hot House
20. Four Apartment Building No. 1
21. Four Apartment Building No. 2
22. Paint and Repair Shop
23. Incinerator

Other parts of the hospital include: art rooms, staff housing, nurses' homes, playgrounds, theater, seclusion rooms, storage areas, chapels, morgues, and boiler rooms.

The buildings are characterized by broken glass, peeling paint, corroded walls and overgrown vines. Several of the buildings also have collapsed roofs.

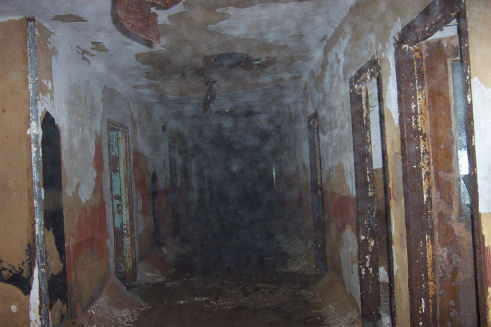
Interior of a ward

The children's hospital building and adult hospital building are the most widely explored structures by local trespassers. This is primarily due to their close distance to Glenn Dale Road, a local street that bisects the hospital grounds.

Contrary to popular belief, the large incinerator present on the hospital grounds was not used for the destruction of human remains. Instead, hospital waste was burned.

Both the children's and adults' buildings are connected by a series of tunnels, like many sanitariums. These walkways join the basements of both buildings together. The basements of the hospital buildings are extremely dangerous and filthy. Large pieces of rusty, sharp metal, cloth and debris hang from the ceiling, and the buildings contain large amounts of asbestos and lead paint. Each hospital basement has its own morgue. Today, these walkways are littered with garbage, broken glass, and graffiti. The hospital basements are also infested with rats and bats. In addition, parts of the walkways are flooded with nearly 3 feet (0.91 m) of water.

== Proposed sale ==
In 1994, Maryland enacted a law that requires if the grounds are sold, they are supposed to be used as a continuing care retirement community. The rest of the land is meant to be open space park land. In 1995, the Maryland-National Capital Park and Planning Commission (MNCPPC) purchased the property from the District of Columbia. Under the deed, if the MNCPPC receives more than its cost from selling the property, it must share the proceeds with the District.

In June 2010, MNCPPC advertised for proposals to purchase the 60-acre (240,000 m^{2}) hospital campus "as is" with the MNCPPC retaining the surrounding 150 acres (0.61 km^{2}). Final bids were due on September 14, 2010, but that deadline was extended to October 15, 2010. Ultimately, two bids were received, but the MNCPPC rejected both bids on the basis that neither bidder was licensed to operate a continuing care retirement community. In the meantime, the Countywide Historic Preservation Staff of MNCPPC is preparing an application to designate the hospital on the National Register of Historic Places, which would make tax credits available for restoration. It was listed on the National Register of Historic Places in November 2011. In 2014, Preservation Maryland placed the Glenn Dale Hospital on its list of threatened historic properties.

== "Quarantined" ==
The hospital was featured in an award-winning Washington Post Magazine article, "Quarantined," on Dec. 10, 2006 by Leah Y. Latimer, former staff writer and author. The article detailed Latimer's mother's hospitalization there in the 1950s and the emotional fall-out for their family from then to the present. Latimer gave a lecture on the actual grounds of Glenn Dale on October 4, 2008. It was the first time the public was allowed on the grounds in almost 30 years. The unadvertised event drew more than 150 people.

== Gallery ==
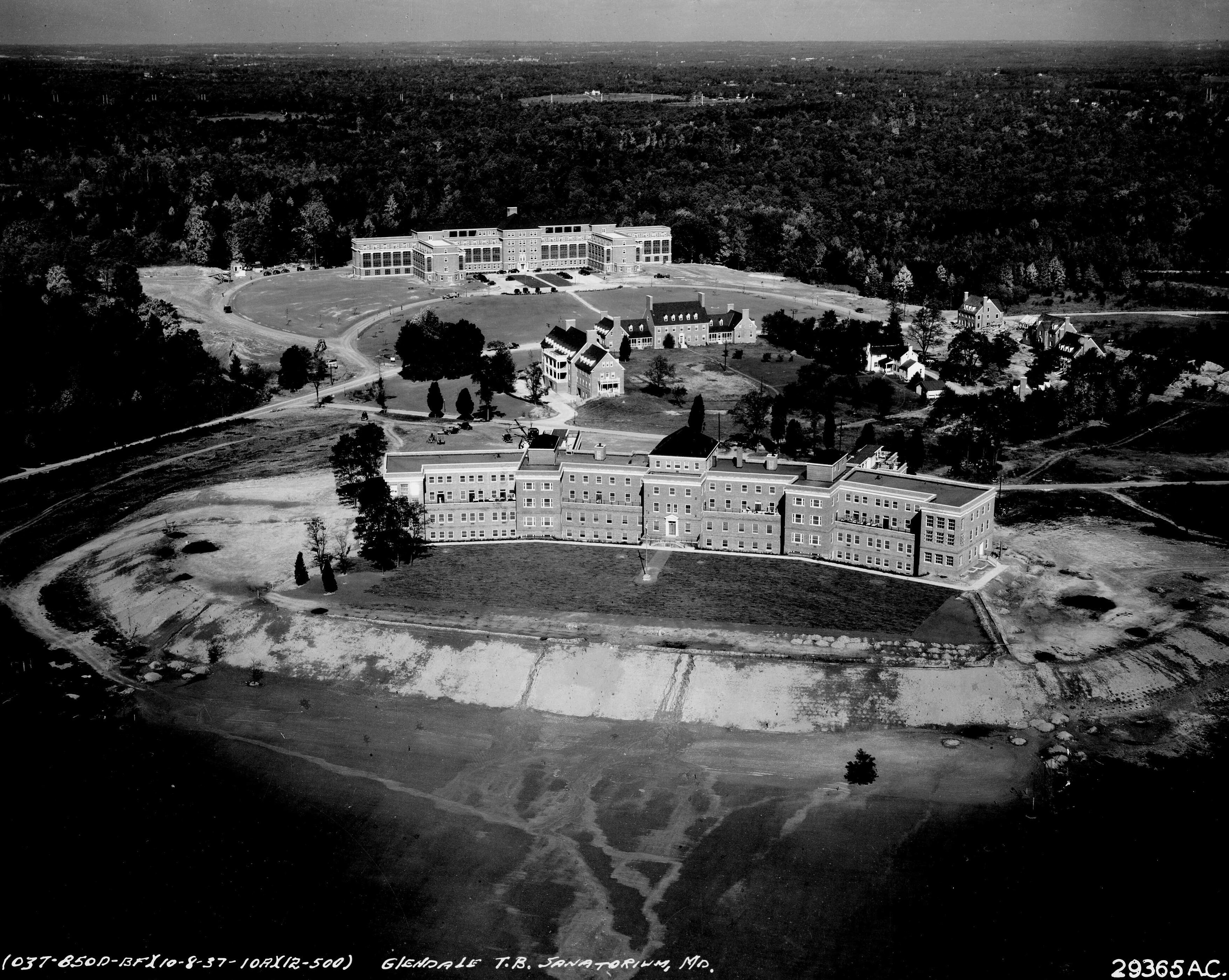
Aerial view of the complex, 1945

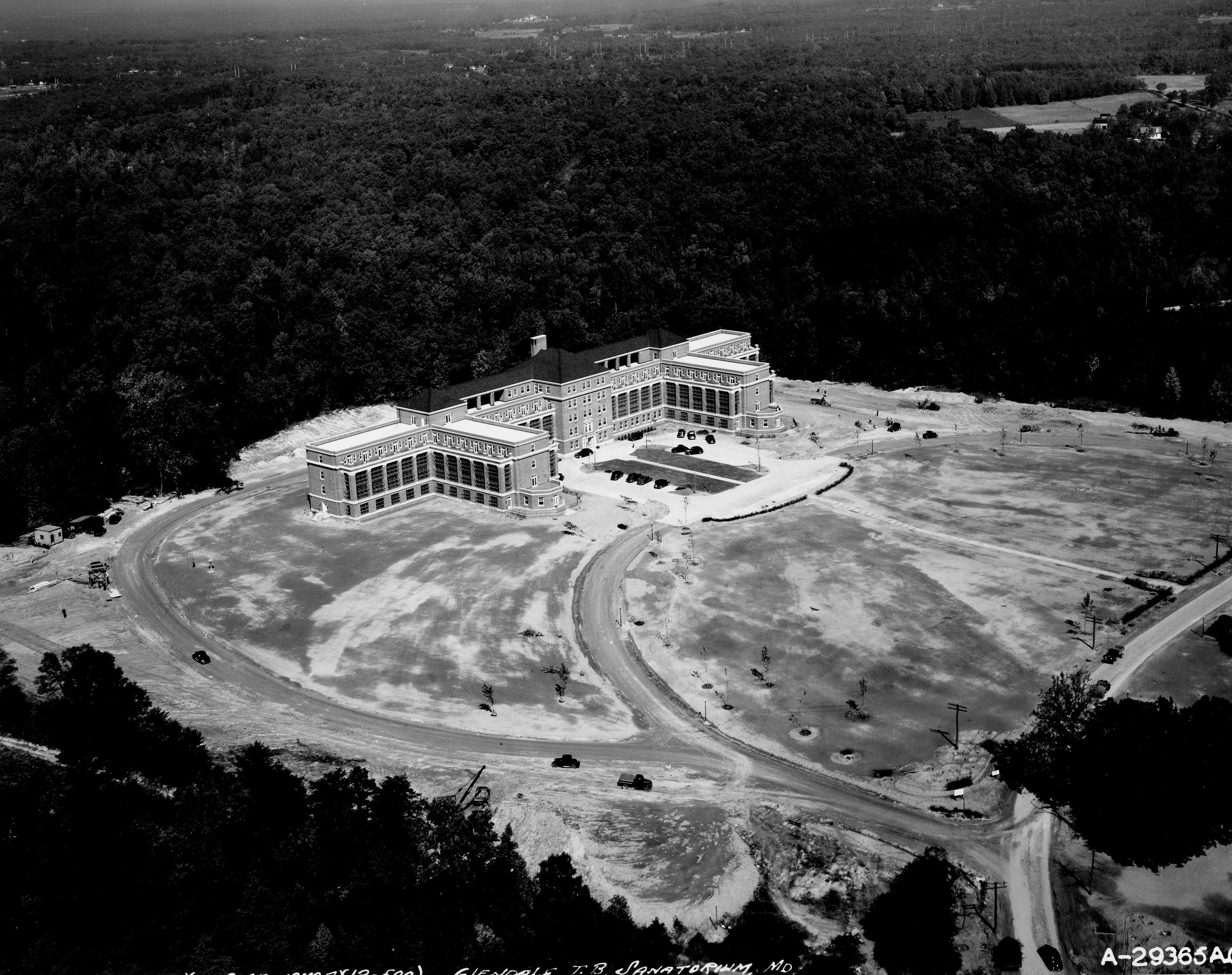
Aerial view, 1945

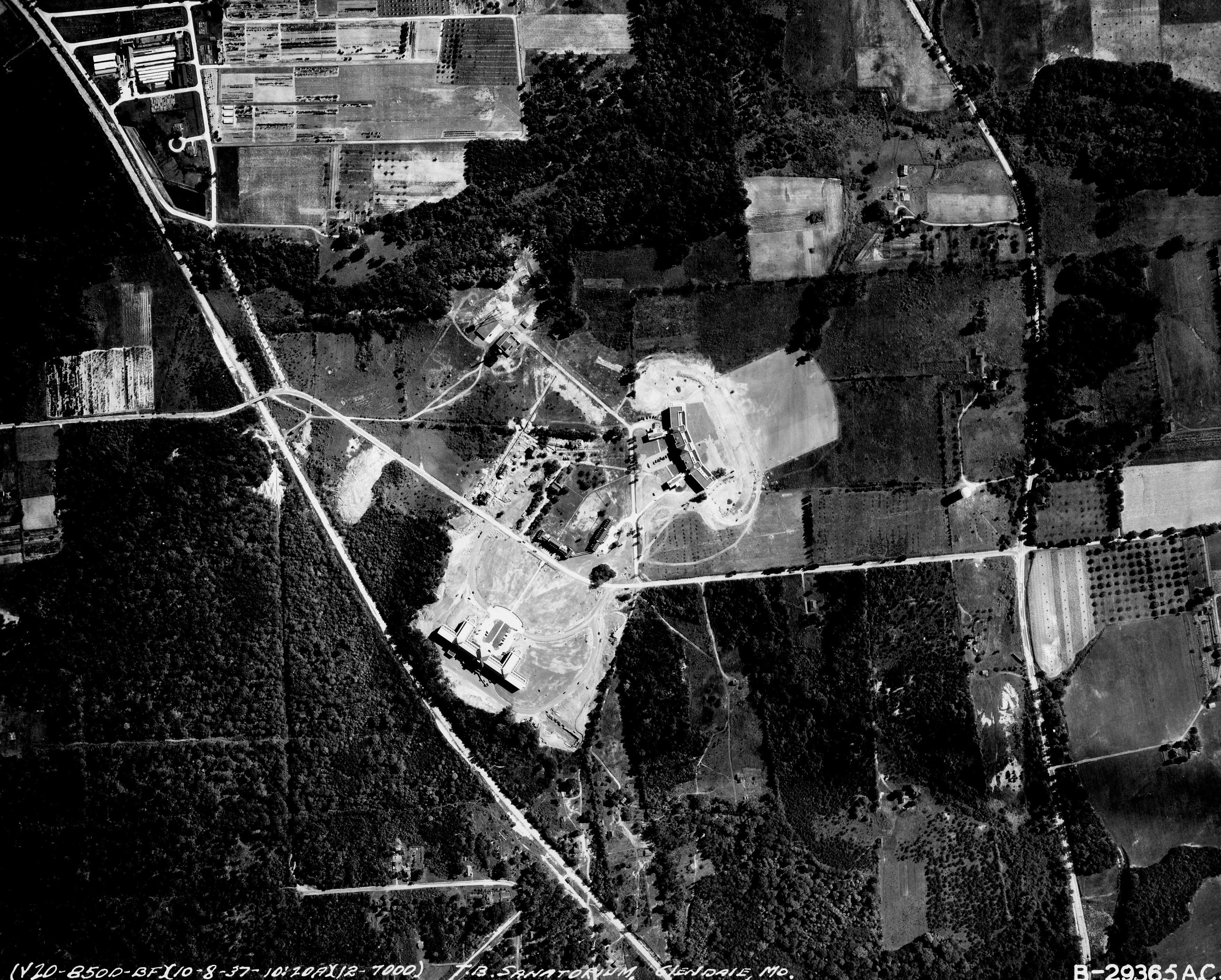
Aerial view of surrounding area, 1945
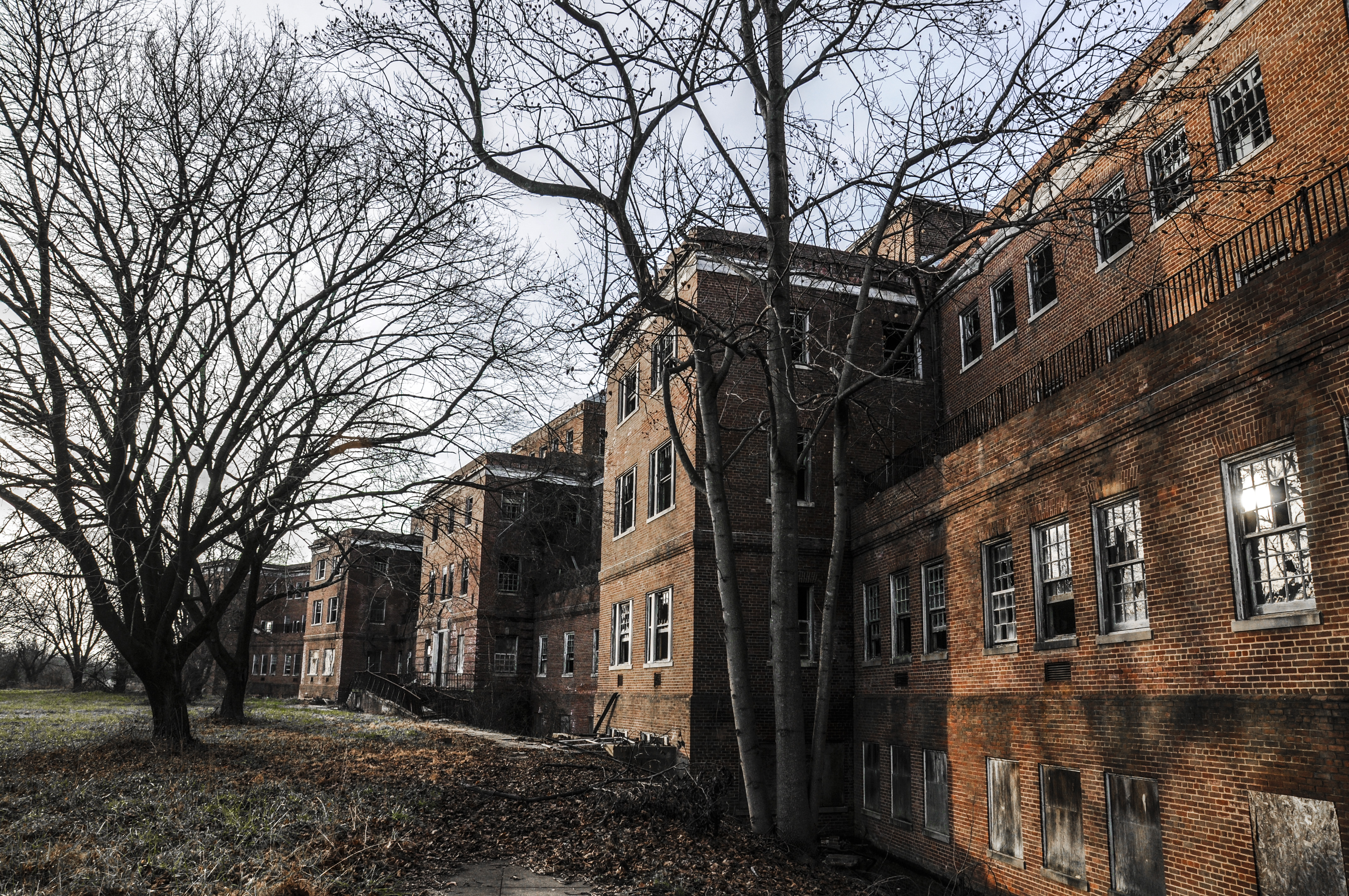
The back of the Children's Hospital Building.

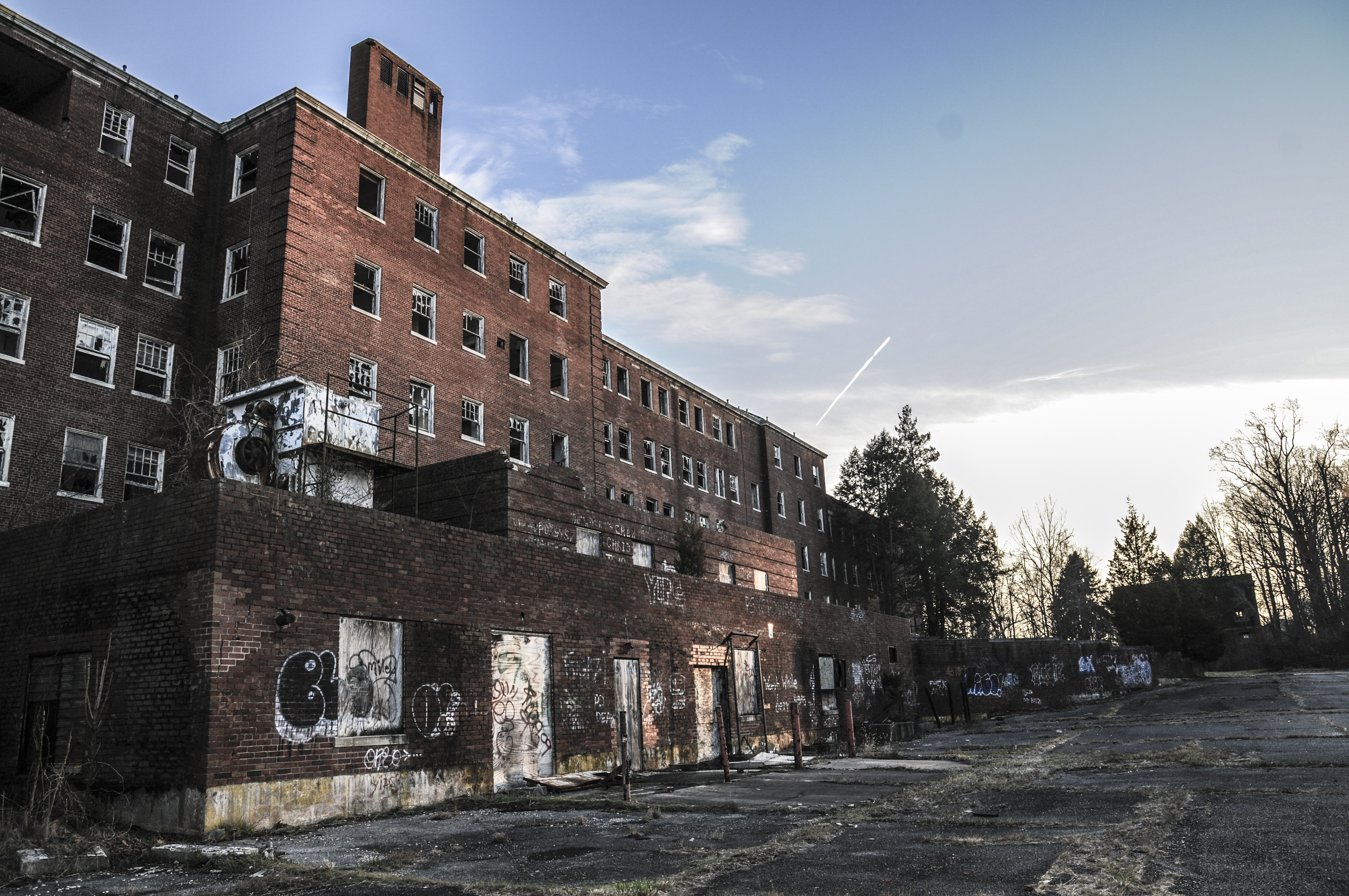
Side view of the back of the Adult Hospital Building

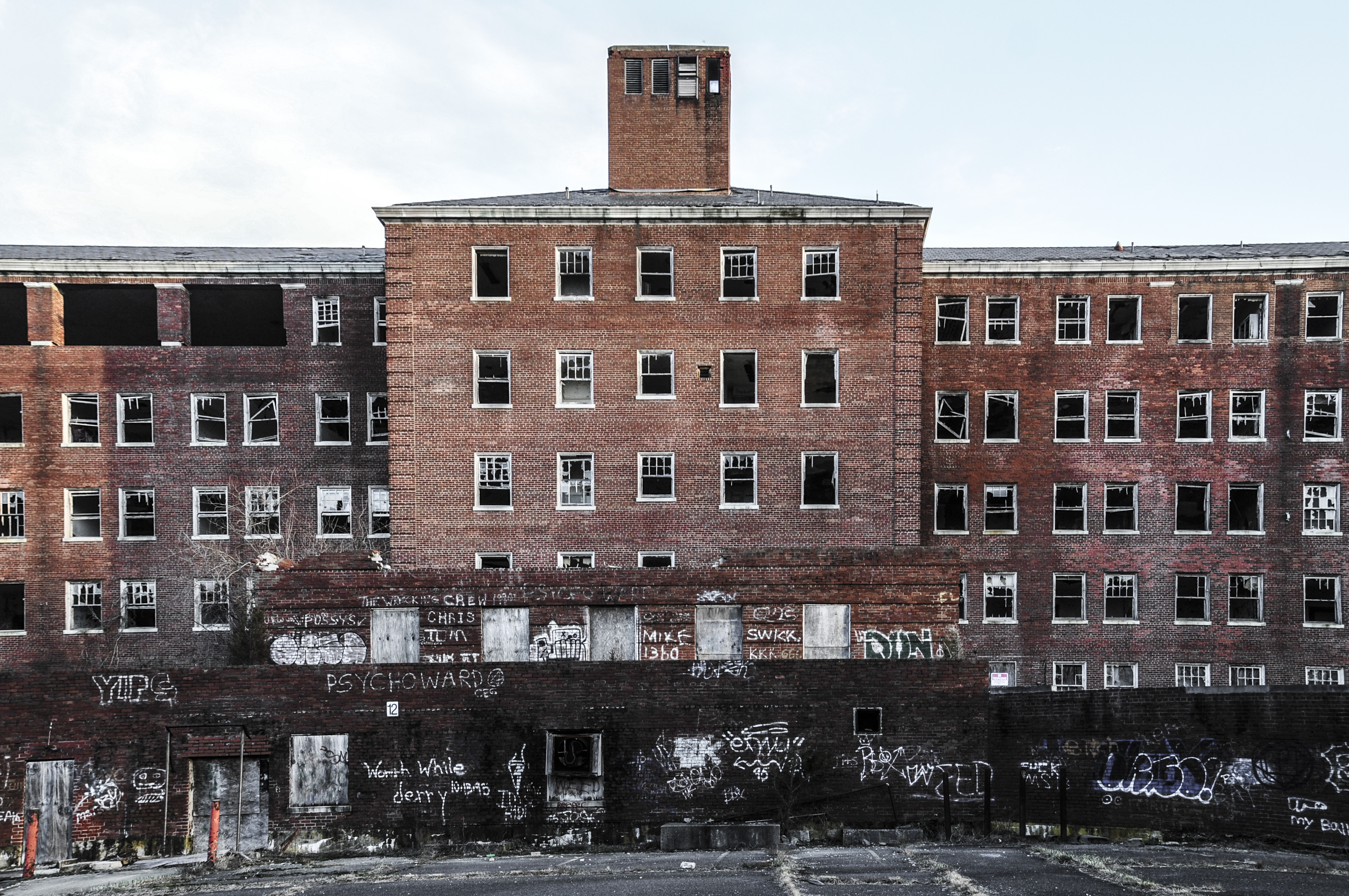
The back of the Adult Hospital Building
