= Janney Elementary School =

- U.S. National Register of Historic Places
- D.C. Inventory of Historic Sites
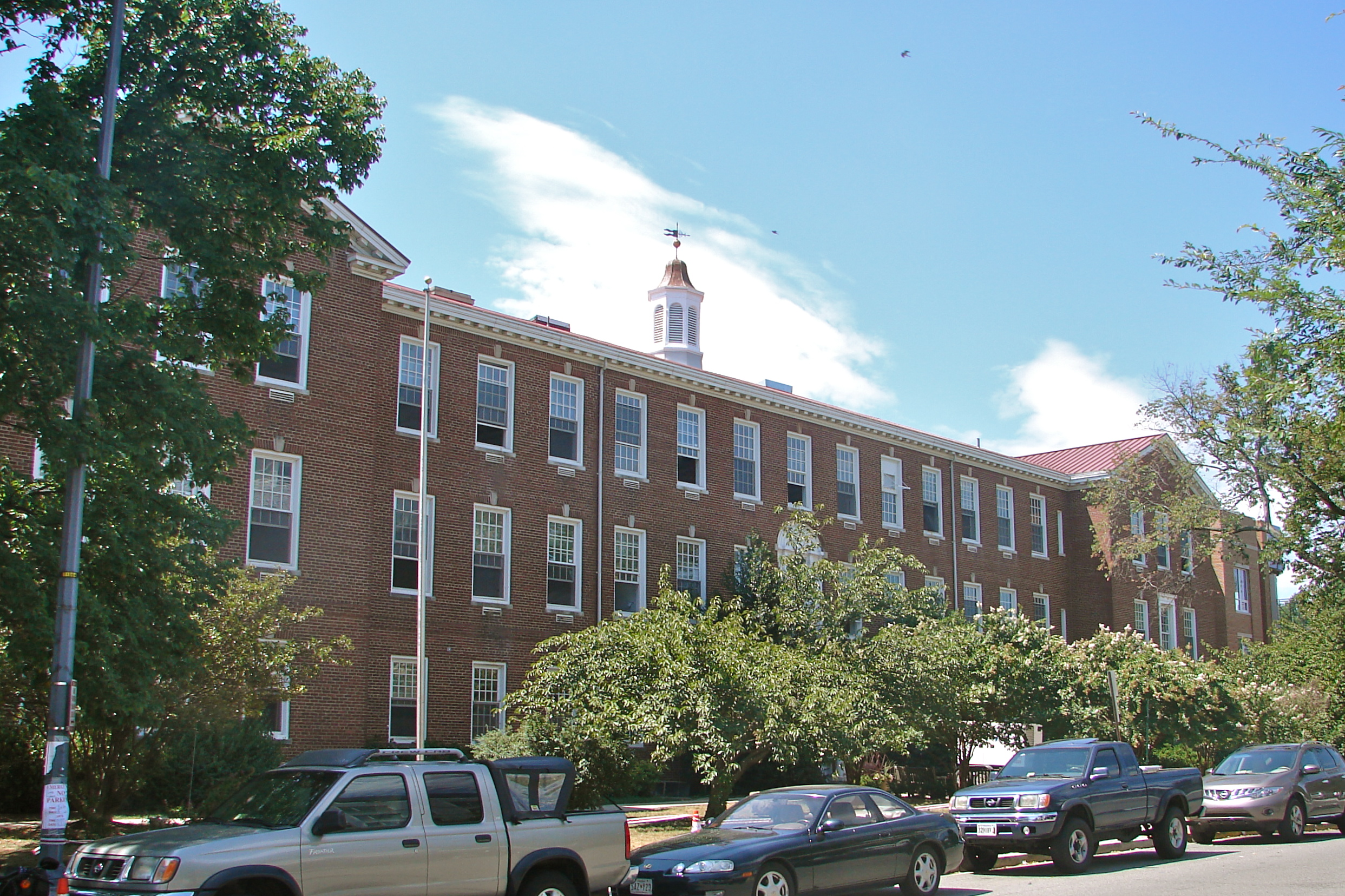

- Location within District of Columbia
- Location: 4130 Albemarle Street, NW, Washington, D.C.
- Coordinates: 38°56′52″N 77°4′50″W
- Built: 1925
- Architect: Albert L. Harris
- MPS: Public School Buildings of Washington, D.C. and Tenleytown in Washington, D.C.: Historic and Architectural Resources, 1770-1941
- NRHP reference No.: 10000241

Significant dates
- Added to NRHP: May 10, 2010
- Designated DCIHS: November 19, 2009

The Janney Elementary School is a public elementary school from Pre-K through 5th grade. A part of the District of Columbia Public Schools, it enrolls approximately 740 students.

The building itself is noted as a historic school building, located at 4130 Albemarle Street, Northwest, Washington, D.C., in the Tenleytown neighborhood.

== History ==
Janney Elementary School opened in 1925. It was heralded as:

the last word in modern schoolhouse construction. It will have two distinctive features which other buildings of its type in the District lack – a combination gymnasium and assembly hall and adequate outdoor play space.

It was designed by Municipal Architect Albert L. Harris.

It was deemed significant for its architecture:

The Janney Elementary school is a three-story, three part brick building with a long central pavilion, two end wings and a rear auditorium/gymnasium. The central block, east wing and auditorium were all constructed in 1925; the west end wing, constructed in 1932, completed the building as planned. Designed by Municipal Architect Albert Harris, Janney Elementary School is executed in a Colonial Revival style characteristic of the architect, and built as the first of Harris’s “extensible” schools for the city. Harris developed the “extensible” school plan in an effort to implement the School Board’s aggressive Five Year Building Program of the 1920s that sought to provide new schools especially in the city’s developing neighborhoods. Janney Elementary School provides an excellent example of an extensible school as discussed in the sub-context, “The Municipal Architects Office, 1910–1930” as detailed and evaluated in the Multiple Property Document Public School Buildings of Washington, D.C., 1864–1960.

It was named for Bernard T. Janney, and it was deemed significant also in education:

The Janney Elementary School was built in 1925 to relieve overcrowding at the older, 1882 Tenley School in Tenleytown. The school was named for Bernard T. Janney, a much-admired educator who served as supervisor of the Georgetown schools in the District of Columbia from 1874 until 1916. At the time of its construction, Tenleytown was experiencing a major population boom as the former 19th-century working-class village was being transformed into a residential neighborhood of the District of new single-family, detached dwellings that catered to the city’s burgeoning white professional class. Janney Elementary School, which still serves as a neighborhood elementary school, survives as an excellent illustration of the 20“’-century institutional growth and maturation of Tenleytown from rural village to urban neighborhood, as detailed in the sub-context “Institutional Growth of Tenleytown” in the Multiple Property Document, “Tenleytown in Washington, D.C.: Historic and Architectural Resources, 1770–1941.”

In 1926, principal Blanche Pulizzi provided space for Tenleytown's public library. In 1932, the west wing was completed. A renovation started in 2010, and was completed in 2011. A separate renovation took place in 2012, that expanded the west wing of the school, and added classrooms.

It was listed by the D.C. Historic Preservation Review Board, in 2009. It was listed on the National Register of Historic Places, in 2010.

Its principal is Danielle Singh.

See the two MPS documents:

== See also ==
- National Register of Historic Places listings in Washington, D.C.
