= Potomac Heights (Washington, D.C.) =

- Neighborhood of Washington, D.C.
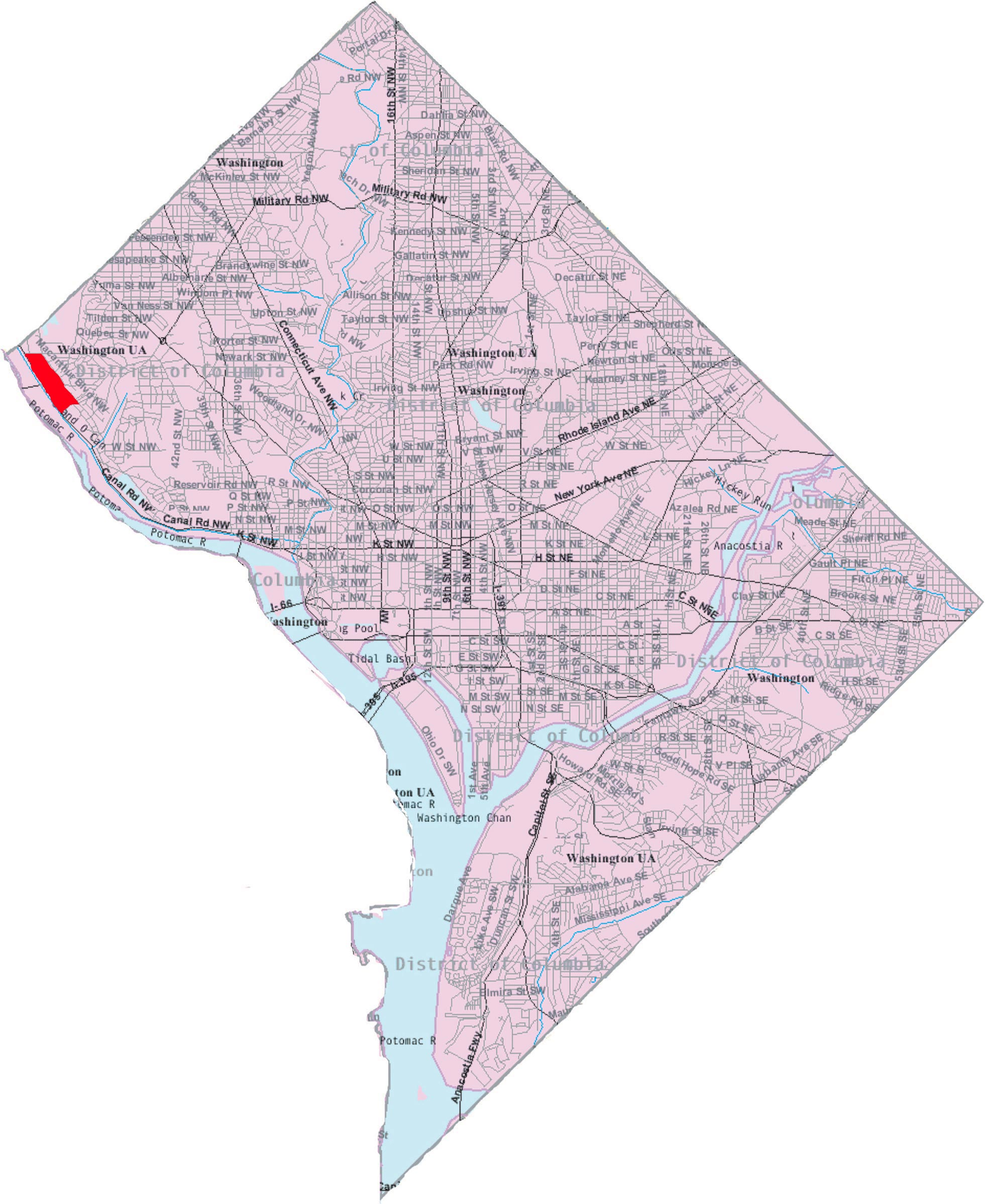
- Map of Washington, D.C., with Potomac Heights highlighted in red
- Coordinates: 38.9276°N 77.1078°W
- Country: United States
- District: Washington, D.C.
- Ward: Ward 3

Government
  - Councilmember: Matthew Frumin
- Postal code: ZIP code

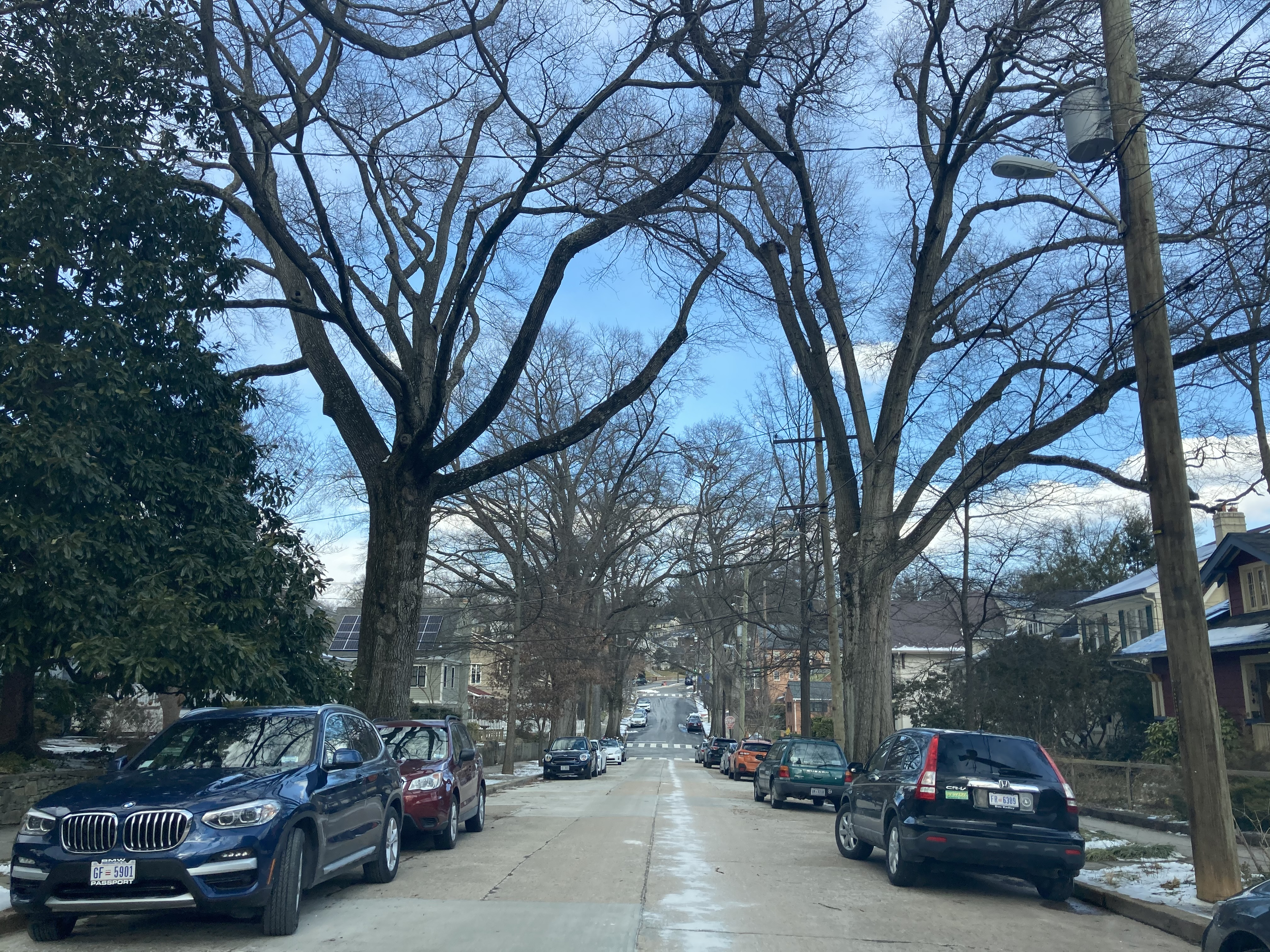
Intersection of Cathedral Ave. and Carolina Place NW in February 2021

Potomac Heights is a neighborhood in Northwest Washington, D.C., overlooking the Potomac River from MacArthur Boulevard westward. Potomac Heights is the part of the Palisades bounded to the north by Loughboro Road and to the south by Chain Bridge and Arizona Avenue NW. It is part of Advisory Neighborhood Commission 3D in Ward 3, the far northwest corner of the Northwest Quadrant just north of Georgetown.

In June 1909, the Potomac Heights Land Co. (based in N.C.) acquired 75 acres (300,000 m^{2}) previously known as the Athletic Park tract at the reported cost of $1000 an acre. The tract extends parallel with and between Conduit Road and the Potomac. It is divided by the Washington Railway and Electric Company and ran from Georgetown to Glen Echo for a 5 cent fare. There were 800 lots at $450–$500 per lot and no home was to be erected at less than $,2500.

Sights in the area include Chesapeake & Ohio Canal National Historic Park, Andrew S. Edwards Island, and Chain Bridge.
