= Blanche Kelso Bruce Elementary School =

- Blanche Kelso Bruce School
- U.S. National Register of Historic Places
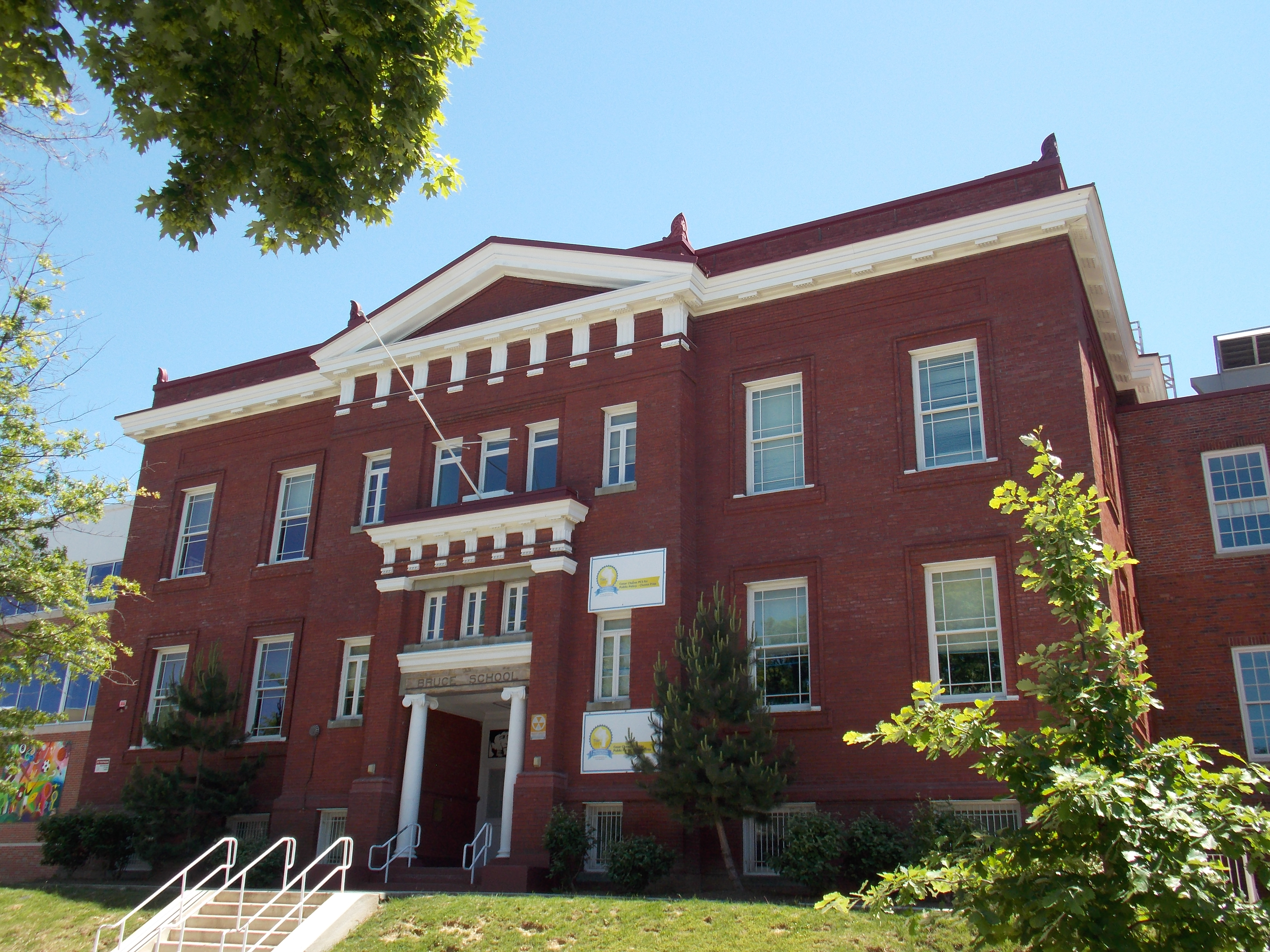
- Blanche Kelso Bruce School

- Location within Washington, D.C.
- Location: 770 Kenyon St, NW; Washington, D.C.
- Coordinates: 38°55′47″N 77°1′32″W
- Built: 1916
- Architect: William M. Poindexter; Albert L. Harris (1927 annex)
- Architectural style: Renaissance Revival and Colonial Revival
- NRHP reference No.: 15000114
- Added to NRHP: March 31, 2015

The Blanche K. Bruce School was an all-black school and community center during the Jim Crow era in the United States. In July 1898, the District of Columbia public school trustees ordered that a then new public school building on Marshall Street be named the Bruce School in his honor. The Bruce School building was designed by architect William M. Poindexter in Renaissance Revival style of red brick with stone and pressed metal trim, with two floors of four rooms each. In 1927, a Colonial Revival style eight-room annex was constructed, designed by architect Albert L. Harris. (Marshall Street later became Kenyon Street.)

In 1973, the Bruce School was closed and combined with the James Monroe Elementary School to become the nearby Bruce-Monroe Elementary School.

The Bruce School building became the charter Caesar Chavez Prep Middle School in 2009, named for the Mexican-American labor organizer Cesar Chavez. After the teachers unionized in 2017, the school was closed by the Chavez Schools in 2019.

The building was designated a D.C. historic site on November 20, 2014, and added to the National Register of Historic Places on March 31, 2015.
