= Glenn Dale, Maryland =

- CDP
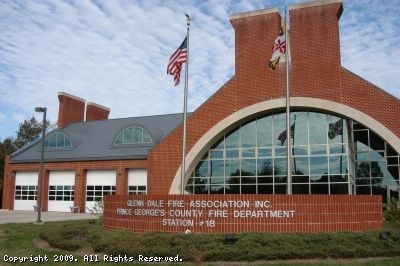
- Glenn Dale Fire House at 11900 Glenn Dale Boulevard

- Location of Glenn Dale, Maryland
- Coordinates: 38°58′58″N 76°48′24″W
- Country: United States
- State: Maryland
- County: Prince George's

Area
  - Total: 7.26 sq mi (18.81 km^{2})
  - Land: 7.15 sq mi (18.53 km^{2})
  - Water: 0.11 sq mi (0.28 km^{2})
- Elevation: 121 ft (37 m)

Population (2020)
  - Total: 14,698
  - Density: 2,054/sq mi (793.2/km^{2})
- Time zone: UTC−5 (Eastern (EST))
  - Summer (DST): UTC−4 (EDT)
- ZIP code: 20769, 20720 (extended area)
- Area codes: 301, 240
- FIPS code: 24-33400
- GNIS feature ID: 0598307

Glenn Dale is an unincorporated area and census-designated place (CDP) in Prince George's County, Maryland, United States. The population was 14,698 at the 2020 census. Glenn Dale is home to the Glenn Dale Hospital, an abandoned sanatorium, and the USDA Plant Introduction Station.

== Geography ==
Glenn Dale is located at 38°58′58″N 76°48′24″W (38.982902, −76.806748).

According to the United States Census Bureau, the CDP has a total area of 7.2 square miles (18.7 km^{2}), of which 7.1 square miles (18.4 km^{2}) is land and 0.12 square miles (0.3 km^{2}), or 1.52%, is water.

=== Climate ===
The climate in this area is characterized by hot, humid summers and generally mild to cool winters. According to the Köppen Climate Classification system, Glenn Dale has a humid subtropical climate, abbreviated "Cfa" on climate maps.

== Boundaries ==
As delineated by the U.S. Census Bureau, Glenn Dale is bordered by:

- To the north, unincorporated Prince George's County
- To the east, the city of Bowie
- To the south, the census-designated places of Fairwood and Mitchellville
- To the west, the census-designated places of Lanham and Seabrook

The northern boundary of the CDP is formed by Good Luck Road and Duckettown Road. The eastern boundary is formed with the city boundary of Bowie, then by Chestnut Avenue and High Bridge Road, then again by the boundary of Bowie. The southern boundary of Glenn Dale is formed by Annapolis Road (Maryland Route 450), and the western boundary follows the stream called Folly Branch, then Lanham-Severn Road (Maryland Route 564), then Greenbelt Road (Route 193), returning to Good Luck Road.

== Demographics ==
Historical population
Census	Pop.	Note	%±
1980	5,106		—
1990	9,689		89.8%
2000	12,609		30.1%
2010	13,466		6.8%
2020	14,698		9.1%
U.S. Decennial Census; 2010 2020

=== Racial and ethnic composition ===
Glenn Dale CDP, Maryland – Racial and ethnic composition Note: the US Census treats Hispanic/Latino as an ethnic category. This table excludes Latinos from the racial categories and assigns them to a separate category. Hispanics/Latinos may be of any race.
Race / Ethnicity (NH = Non-Hispanic)	Pop 2000	Pop 2010	Pop 2020	% 2000	% 2010	% 2020
White alone (NH)	2,709	3,193	2,441	18.11%	23.71%	16.61%
Black or African American alone (NH)	7,333	7,941	8,950	49.01%	58.97%	60.89%
Native American or Alaska Native alone (NH)	42	46	15	0.28%	0.34%	0.10%
Asian alone (NH)	537	881	846	3.59%	6.54%	5.76%
Native Hawaiian or Pacific Islander alone (NH)	7	3	0	0.05%	0.02%	0.00%
Other race alone (NH)	38	50	105	0.25%	0.37%	0.71%
Mixed race or Multiracial (NH)	335	302	481	2.24%	2.24%	3.27%
Hispanic or Latino (any race)	3,960	1,050	1,860	26.47%	7.80%	12.65%
Total	14,961	13,466	14,698	100.00%	100.00%	100.00%

=== 2020 census ===
As of the 2020 census, Glenn Dale had a population of 14,698. The median age was 41.4 years. 21.7% of residents were under the age of 18 and 15.9% of residents were 65 years of age or older. For every 100 females there were 94.4 males, and for every 100 females age 18 and over there were 91.8 males age 18 and over.

100.0% of residents lived in urban areas, while 0.0% lived in rural areas.

There were 4,613 households in Glenn Dale, of which 35.4% had children under the age of 18 living in them. Of all households, 58.5% were married-couple households, 14.0% were households with a male householder and no spouse or partner present, and 23.7% were households with a female householder and no spouse or partner present. About 16.0% of all households were made up of individuals and 6.3% had someone living alone who was 65 years of age or older.

There were 4,760 housing units, of which 3.1% were vacant. The homeowner vacancy rate was 1.1% and the rental vacancy rate was 4.1%.

=== 2000 census ===
As of the census of 2000, there were 12,609 people, 4,086 households, and 3,305 families residing in the CDP. The population density was 1,710.0 inhabitants per square mile (660.2/km^{2}). There were 4,165 housing units at an average density of 564.9 per square mile (218.1/km^{2}). The racial makeup of the CDP was 40.38% White, 48.09% African American, 0.25% Native American, 7.80% Asian, 0.03% Pacific Islander, 0.92% from other races, and 2.52% from two or more races. Hispanic or Latino people of any race were 2.41% of the population.

There were 4,086 households, out of which 45.7% had children under the age of 18 living with them, 62.6% were married couples living together, 13.9% had a female householder with no husband present, and 19.1% were non-families. 13.4% of all households were made up of individuals, and 1.9% had someone living alone who was 65 years of age or older. The average household size was 3.08 and the average family size was 3.39.

In the CDP, the population was spread out, with 29.8% under the age of 18, 7.8% from 18 to 24, 32.2% from 25 to 44, 24.7% from 45 to 64, and 5.5% who were 65 years of age or older. The median age was 34 years. For every 100 females, there were 93.2 males. For every 100 females age 18 and over, there were 89.6 males.

The median income for a household in the CDP was $80,851, and the median income for a family was $85,448. Males had a median income of $53,484 versus $40,450 for females. The per capita income for the CDP was $27,920. About 2.6% of families and 4.5% of the population were below the poverty line, including 4.3% of those under age 18 and 9.9% of those age 65 or over.

== Glenn Dale Fire Association ==
The Glenn Dale Fire Association was formed to serve as a volunteer fire department for the Glenn Dale area in 1928. Prior to that, there was no organized fire protection available for quite some distance around.

== Glenn Dale Hospital ==
Glenn Dale Hospital was a tuberculosis sanatorium. It is a large facility, consisting of 23 buildings on 210 acres (0.85 km^{2}), that was built in 1934 and closed in 1982 due to asbestos. Though it will be eventually demolished, for decades it was an important public health institution near Washington, D.C. Park Police patrol the hospital grounds regularly.

The hospital was featured in an award-winning Washington Post Magazine article, "Quarantined," on Dec. 10, 2006, by Leah Y. Latimer, former staff writer and author. The article detailed Latimer's mother's hospitalization there in the 1950s and the emotional fall-out for their family from then to the present. Latimer gave a lecture on the grounds of Glenn Dale on October 4, 2008. It was the first time the public was allowed on the grounds in almost 30 years. The unadvertised event drew more than 150 people. Latimer said she plans more lectures around the area, based on her continuing research and 110+ interviews.

The hospital was listed on the National Register of Historic Places in 2011.

== Glenn Dale Golf Club ==
Glenn Dale Golf Club was a public golf course owned and operated by the Shields family from 1958 through August 2019, on a property once owned by Associate U.S. Supreme Court Justice Gabriel Duvall. The family also owned and operated the now closed Twin Shields Golf Club.

LPGA golfer Troy Beck, the head teaching professional at the Glenn Dale Golf Club driving range, was well known for her playing history and commitment to junior golf. Since the Glenn Dale Golf Club closed, she has operated her golf academy at Lake Presidential Golf Club in Upper Marlboro, Maryland.

== Government ==
The U.S. Postal Service operates the Glenn Dale Post Office.

== Education ==
The area is served by the Prince George's County Public Schools system.

Elementary schools serving sections of the CDP are Glenn Dale, Catherine T. Reed, and High Bridge.

Residents of the CDP are served in separate zones by Thomas Johnson Middle School and Samuel Ogle Middle School.

Residents of the CDP are served in separate zones by DuVal High School and Bowie High School.

Private schools in Glenn Dale:

- Holy Trinity Episcopal Day School (Middle School)
- Reid Temple Christian Academy
