= Maryland's 8th congressional district =

U.S. House district for Maryland

Coordinates: 39.1°N 77.25°W

- Interactive map of district boundaries since January 3, 2023
- Representative: Jamie Raskin; D–Takoma Park
- Area: 297.06 mi^{2} (769.4 km^{2})
- Distribution: 88.08% urban; 11.92% rural
- Population (2025): 777,367
- Median household income: $137,519
- Ethnicity: 44.3% White; 19.7% Hispanic; 16.3% Black; 14.0% Asian; 4.7% Two or more races; 1.0% other
- Cook PVI: D+30

Maryland's 8th congressional district is a congressional district located almost entirely in Montgomery County except for a tiny slice of Prince George's County to the southeast. Adjacent to Washington, D.C., the 8th district takes in many of the city's wealthiest inner-ring suburbs, including Bethesda, Chevy Chase, and Potomac. It also includes several more economically and racially diverse communities, the most populous of which are Rockville and Silver Spring.

With a median household income of $120,948, it is the ninth-wealthiest congressional district in the nation. The 8th district also has the eighth-highest share of residents with at least a bachelor's degree, at 63.9%. Those above-average numbers are largely due to the substantial presence of the federal government in nearby Washington, where thousands of the 8th district's residents commute to work on a daily basis. Several federal agencies are likewise located within the 8th district, including the Food and Drug Administration, the National Institutes of Health, the Nuclear Regulatory Commission, and the Walter Reed National Military Medical Center. Two Fortune 500 companies are headquartered in the district: Lockheed Martin and Marriott International. Almost 40% of the district's residents are immigrants, with the largest numbers coming from El Salvador, Ethiopia, India, China, Korea, Guatemala, and Peru. The district includes the Little Ethiopia area of Silver Spring and Takoma Park, and has the largest Ethiopian American population of any congressional district.

Politically, the district is heavily liberal. It has consistently sent Democratic representatives to Congress by wide margins since 2002. In 2020, Joe Biden won nearly 80% of its vote. Democrat Jamie Raskin has represented the seat since 2017.

== History ==
The district was created after the 1790 census in time for the 1792 election, was abolished after the 1830 census, and was reinstated after the 1960 census.

During redistricting after the 2000 census, the Democratic-dominated Maryland legislature sought to unseat then-incumbent Republican Connie Morella. One proposal went so far as to divide the district in two, effectively giving one to state Senator Christopher Van Hollen, Jr. and forcing Morella to run against popular Maryland State Delegate and Kennedy political family member Mark Kennedy Shriver. The final redistricting plan was less ambitious, restoring an eastern, heavily Democratic spur of Montgomery County removed in the 1990 redistricting to the 8th District (encompassing nearly all of the area "inside the Beltway"), as well as adding an adjacent portion from heavily Democratic Prince George's County. Although it forced Van Hollen and Shriver to run against each other in an expensive primary, the shift still made the district even more Democratic than its predecessor, and Van Hollen defeated Morella in 2002.

From 2003 to 2013 the district, in addition to the larger part of Montgomery County and the small portion of Prince George's County, included most of Frederick County (but not the City of Frederick), and southern Carroll County. The redrawn district was slightly less Democratic than its predecessor. While the Carroll and Frederick portions of the district tilted strongly Republican, the Montgomery County portion had twice as many people as the rest of the district combined, and Montgomery's Democratic tilt was enough to keep the district in the Democratic column. Since Morella left office, no Republican has crossed the 40 percent mark in the 8th District.

== Composition ==
For the 118th and successive Congresses (based on redistricting following the 2020 census), the district contains all or portions of the following counties and communities:

Montgomery County (51)

Ashton-Sandy Spring (part; also 4th), Aspen Hill, Bethesda, Brookville, Brookmont, Burnt Mills, Cabin John, Calverton (part; also 4th; shared with Prince George's County), Chevy Chase (CDP), Chevy Chase (town), Chevy Chase Section Five, Chevy Chase Section Three, Chevy Chase View, Chevy Chase Village, Cloverly (part; also 4th), Colesville, Damascus (part; also 6th), Darnestown (part; also 6th), Derwood, Fairland (part; also 4th), Flower Hill, Forest Glen, Four Corners, Friendship Heights Village, Garrett Park, Glen Echo, Glenmont, Hillandale (part; also 6th; shared with Prince George's County), Kemp Mill, Kensington, Layhill, Laytonsville, Leisure World, Martin's Additions, Montgomery Village (part; also 6th), North Bethesda, North Chevy Chase, North Kensington, Olney, Potomac, Redland, Rockville, Silver Spring, Somerset, South Kensington, Spencerville (part; also 4th), Takoma Park (part; also 4th), Travilah, Washington Grove, Wheaton, White Oak

== Recent election results from statewide races ==
Year	Office	Results
2008	President	Obama 73% – 26%
2012	President	Obama 73% – 27%
2012	Senate	Cardin 67% – 21%
2014	Governor	Brown 64% – 36%
2016	President	Clinton 76% – 18%
2016	Senate	Van Hollen 76% – 21%
2018	Senate	Cardin 78% – 18%
2018	Governor	Jealous 55% – 44%
2018	Attorney General	Frosh 79% – 21%
2020	President	Biden 80% – 18%
2022	Senate	Van Hollen 82% – 18%
2022	Governor	Moore 80% – 17%
2022	Comptroller	Lierman 76% – 23%
2022	Attorney General	Brown 81% – 19%
2024	President	Harris 76% – 20%
2024	Senate	Alsobrooks 67% – 31%

== Recent elections ==
=== 1960s ===
Maryland's 8th congressional district election (new district), 1966
Party	Candidate	Votes	%
Republican	Gilbert Gude	71,050	54.40
Democratic	Royce Hanson	59,568	45.60
Total votes		130,618	100.00

Maryland's 8th congressional district election, 1968
Party	Candidate	Votes	%
Republican	Gilbert Gude (Incumbent)	109,167	60.89
Democratic	Margaret C. Schweinhaut	70,109	39.11
Total votes		179,276	100.00
Republican hold			

=== 1970s ===
Maryland's 8th congressional district election, 1970
Party	Candidate	Votes	%
Republican	Gilbert Gude (Incumbent)	104,647	63.38
Democratic	Thomas Hale Boggs, Jr.	60,456	36.62
Total votes		165,103	100.00
Republican hold			

Maryland's 8th congressional district election, 1972
Party	Candidate	Votes	%
Republican	Gilbert Gude (Incumbent)	137,287	63.90
Democratic	Joseph G. Anastasi	77,551	36.10
Total votes		214,838	100.00
Republican hold			

Maryland's 8th congressional district election, 1974
Party	Candidate	Votes	%
Republican	Gilbert Gude (Incumbent)	104,675	65.92
Democratic	Sidney Kramer	54,112	34.08
Total votes		158,787	100.00
Republican hold			

Maryland's 8th congressional district election, 1976
Party	Candidate	Votes	%
Republican	Newton Steers	111,274	46.82
Democratic	Lanny Davis	100,343	42.22
Independent	Robin Ficker	26,035	10.96
Total votes		237,652	100.00
Republican hold			

Maryland's 8th congressional district election, 1978
Party	Candidate	Votes	%
Democratic	Michael D. Barnes	81,851	51.27
Republican	Newton Steers (Incumbent)	77,807	48.73
Total votes		159,658	100.00
Democratic gain from Republican			

=== 1980s ===
Maryland's 8th congressional district election, 1980
Party	Candidate	Votes	%
Democratic	Michael D. Barnes (Incumbent)	148,301	59.33
Republican	Newton Steers	101,659	40.67
Total votes		249,960	100.00
Democratic hold			

Maryland's 8th congressional district election, 1982
Party	Candidate	Votes	%
Democratic	Michael D. Barnes (Incumbent)	121,761	71.34
Republican	Elizabeth W. Spencer	48,910	28.66
Total votes		170,671	100.00
Democratic hold			

Maryland's 8th congressional district election, 1984
Party	Candidate	Votes	%
Democratic	Michael D. Barnes (Incumbent)	181,947	71.47
Republican	Albert Ceccone	70,715	27.78
Libertarian	Samuel K. Grove	1,903	0.75
Write-ins		4	<0.01
Total votes		254,569	100.00
Democratic hold			

Maryland's 8th congressional district election, 1986
Party	Candidate	Votes	%
Republican	Connie Morella	92,917	52.87
Democratic	Stewart Bainum	82,825	47.13
Total votes		175,742	100.00
Republican gain from Democratic			

Maryland's 8th congressional district election, 1988
Party	Candidate	Votes	%
Republican	Connie Morella (Incumbent)	172,619	62.75
Democratic	Peter Franchot	102,478	37.25
Total votes		275,097	100.00
Republican hold			

=== 1990s ===
Maryland's 8th congressional district election, 1990
Party	Candidate	Votes	%
Republican	Connie Morella (Incumbent)	130,059	73.53
Democratic	James Walker	39,343	22.24
Independent	Sidney Altman	7,485	4.23
Total votes		176,887	100.00
Republican hold			

Maryland's 8th congressional district election, 1992
Party	Candidate	Votes	%
Republican	Connie Morella (Incumbent)	203,377	72.53
Democratic	Edward J. Heffernan	77,042	27.47
Total votes		280,419	100.00
Republican hold			

Maryland's 8th congressional district election, 1994
Party	Candidate	Votes	%
Republican	Connie Morella (Incumbent)	143,449	70.28
Democratic	Steven Van Grack	60,660	29.72
Total votes		204,109	100.00
Republican hold			

Maryland's 8th congressional district election, 1996
Party	Candidate	Votes	%
Republican	Connie Morella (Incumbent)	152,538	61.22
Democratic	Donald Mooers	96,229	38.62
Total votes		249,146	100.00
Republican hold			

Maryland's 8th congressional district election, 1998
Party	Candidate	Votes	%
Republican	Connie Morella (Incumbent)	133,145	60.34
Democratic	Ralph G. Neas	87,497	39.66
Total votes		220,642	100.00
Republican hold			

=== 2000s ===
Maryland's 8th congressional district election, 2000
Party	Candidate	Votes	%
Republican	Connie Morella (Incumbent)	156,241	52.00
Democratic	Terry Lierman	136,840	45.54
Constitution	Brian D. Saunders	7,017	2.34
Write-ins		371	0.12
Total votes		300,469	100.00
Republican hold			

Maryland's 8th congressional district election, 2002
Party	Candidate	Votes	%
Democratic	Chris Van Hollen	112,788	51.74
Republican	Connie Morella (Incumbent)	103,587	47.52
Write-ins		1,599	0.73
Total votes		217,974	100.00
Democratic gain from Republican			

Maryland's 8th congressional district election, 2004
Party	Candidate	Votes	%
Democratic	Chris Van Hollen (Incumbent)	215,129	74.91
Republican	Chuck Floyd	71,989	25.07
Write-ins		79	0.03
Total votes		287,197	100.00
Democratic hold			

Maryland's 8th congressional district election, 2006
Party	Candidate	Votes	%
Democratic	Chris Van Hollen (Incumbent)	168,872	76.52
Republican	Jeffrey M. Stein	48,324	21.90
Green	Gerard P. Giblin	3,298	1.49
Write-ins		191	0.09
Total votes		220,685	100.00
Democratic hold			

Maryland's 8th congressional district election, 2008
Party	Candidate	Votes	%
Democratic	Chris Van Hollen (Incumbent)	229,740	75.08
Republican	Steve Hudson	66,351	21.68
Green	Gordon Clark	6,828	2.23
Libertarian	Ian Thomas	2,562	0.84
Write-in	All write-ins	533	0.17
Total votes		306,014	100.00
Democratic hold			

=== 2010s ===
Maryland's 8th congressional district election, 2010
Party	Candidate	Votes	%
Democratic	Chris Van Hollen (Incumbent)	153,613	73.27
Republican	Michael Lee Philips	52,421	25.00
Libertarian	Mark Grannis	2,713	1.29
Constitution	Fred Nordhorn	696	0.33
No party	Write-ins	224	0.11
Total votes		209,667	100.00
Democratic hold			

Maryland's 8th congressional district election, 2012
Party	Candidate	Votes	%
Democratic	Chris Van Hollen (Incumbent)	217,531	63.37
Republican	Kenneth R. Timmerman	113,033	32.93
Libertarian	Mark Grannis	7,235	2.11
Green	George Gluck	5,064	1.48
N/A	Others (write-in)	393	0.11
Total votes		343,256	100
Democratic hold			

Maryland's 8th congressional district election, 2014
Party	Candidate	Votes	%
Democratic	Chris Van Hollen (Incumbent)	136,722	60.74
Republican	Dave Wallace	87,859	39.03
N/A	Others (write-in)	516	0.23
Total votes		225,097	100.00
Democratic hold			

Maryland's 8th congressional district election, 2016
Party	Candidate	Votes	%
Democratic	Jamie Raskin	220,657	60.6
Republican	Dan Cox	124,651	34.2
Green	Nancy Wallace	11,201	3.1
Libertarian	Jasen Wunder	7,283	2.0
N/A	Others (write-in)	532	0.1
Total votes		364,324	100.00
Democratic hold			

Maryland's 8th congressional district, 2018
Party	Candidate	Votes	%
Democratic	Jamie Raskin (Incumbent)	217,679	68.2
Republican	John Walsh	96,525	30.2
Libertarian	Jasen Wunder	4,853	1.5
n/a	Write-ins	273	0.1
Total votes		319,330	100.0
Democratic hold			

=== 2020s ===
Maryland's 8th congressional district, 2020
Party	Candidate	Votes	%
Democratic	Jamie Raskin (incumbent)	274,716	68.2
Republican	Gregory Thomas Coll	127,157	31.6
Write-in		741	0.2
Total votes		402,614	100.0
Democratic hold			

Maryland's 8th congressional district, 2022
Party	Candidate	Votes	%
Democratic	Jamie Raskin (incumbent)	211,842	80.2
Republican	Gregory Coll	47,965	18.1
Libertarian	Andrés Garcia	4,125	1.6
Write-in		274	0.1
Total votes		264,206	100.0
Democratic hold			

Maryland's 8th congressional district, 2024
Party	Candidate	Votes	%
Democratic	Jamie Raskin (incumbent)	292,101	76.80
Republican	Cheryl Riley	77,821	20.46
Green	Nancy Wallace	9,612	2.53
Write-in		786	0.21
Total votes		379,534	100.0
Democratic hold			

== List of members representing the district ==
#	Member	Party	Years	Con- gress	Electoral history	District location
District created March 4, 1793
1	William Vans Murray (Cambridge)	Pro-Administration	March 4, 1793 – March 3, 1795	3rd 4th	Redistricted from the 5th district and re-elected in 1792. Re-elected in 1794. Retired.	1793–1803 [data missing]
1	William Vans Murray (Cambridge)	Federalist	March 4, 1795 – March 3, 1797	3rd 4th	Redistricted from the 5th district and re-elected in 1792. Re-elected in 1794. Retired.	1793–1803 [data missing]
2	John Dennis (Somerset County)	Federalist	March 4, 1797 – March 3, 1805	5th 6th 7th 8th	Elected in 1796. Re-elected in 1798. Re-elected in 1801. Re-elected in 1803. Retired.	1793–1803 [data missing]
2	John Dennis (Somerset County)	Federalist	March 4, 1797 – March 3, 1805	5th 6th 7th 8th	Elected in 1796. Re-elected in 1798. Re-elected in 1801. Re-elected in 1803. Retired.	1803–1813 [data missing]
3	Charles Goldsborough (Cambridge)	Federalist	March 4, 1805 – March 3, 1817	9th 10th 11th 12th 13th 14th	Elected in 1804. Re-elected in 1806. Re-elected in 1808. Re-elected in 1810. Re-elected in 1812. Re-elected in 1814. Retired.	1803–1813 [data missing]
3	Charles Goldsborough (Cambridge)	Federalist	March 4, 1805 – March 3, 1817	9th 10th 11th 12th 13th 14th	Elected in 1804. Re-elected in 1806. Re-elected in 1808. Re-elected in 1810. Re-elected in 1812. Re-elected in 1814. Retired.	1813–1823 [data missing]
4	Thomas Bayly (Princess Anne)	Federalist	March 4, 1817 – March 3, 1823	15th 16th 17th	Elected in 1816. Re-elected in 1818. Re-elected in 1820. Retired.	1813–1823 [data missing]
5	John S. Spence (Poplartown)	Democratic-Republican (Note: Supported the Adams-Clay faction in the 1824 United States presidential election)	March 4, 1823 – March 3, 1825	18th	Elected in 1822. Lost re-election.	1823–1833 [data missing]
6	Robert N. Martin (Princess Anne)	Anti-Jacksonian	March 4, 1825 – March 3, 1827	19th	Elected in 1824. Retired.	1823–1833 [data missing]
7	Ephraim King Wilson (Snow Hill)	Anti-Jacksonian	March 4, 1827 – March 3, 1829	20th 21st	Re-elected in 1826. Re-elected in 1829. Retired.	1823–1833 [data missing]
7	Ephraim King Wilson (Snow Hill)	Jackson	March 4, 1829 – March 3, 1831	20th 21st	Re-elected in 1826. Re-elected in 1829. Retired.	1823–1833 [data missing]
8	John S. Spence (Berlin)	Anti-Jacksonian	March 4, 1831 – March 3, 1833	22nd	Elected in 1831. [data missing]	1823–1833 [data missing]
9	John T. Stoddert (Harris Lot)	Jackson	March 4, 1833 – March 3, 1835	23rd	Elected in 1833. Retired.	1833–1835 [data missing]
Seat eliminated March 4, 1835
Seat re-created January 3, 1967
10	Gilbert Gude (Bethesda)	Republican	January 3, 1967 – January 3, 1977	90th 91st 92nd 93rd 94th	Elected in 1966. Re-elected in 1968. Re-elected in 1970. Re-elected in 1972. Re-elected in 1974. Retired.	1967–1973; Montgomery
10	Gilbert Gude (Bethesda)	Republican	January 3, 1967 – January 3, 1977	90th 91st 92nd 93rd 94th	Elected in 1966. Re-elected in 1968. Re-elected in 1970. Re-elected in 1972. Re-elected in 1974. Retired.	1973–1983; Montgomery
11	Newton Steers (Bethesda)	Republican	January 3, 1977 – January 3, 1979	95th	Elected in 1976. Lost re-election.	1973–1983; Montgomery
12	Michael D. Barnes (Kensington)	Democratic	January 3, 1979 – January 3, 1987	96th 97th 98th 99th	Elected in 1978. Re-elected in 1980. Re-elected in 1982. Re-elected in 1984. Retired to run for U.S. Senator.	1973–1983; Montgomery
12	Michael D. Barnes (Kensington)	Democratic	January 3, 1979 – January 3, 1987	96th 97th 98th 99th	Elected in 1978. Re-elected in 1980. Re-elected in 1982. Re-elected in 1984. Retired to run for U.S. Senator.	1983–1993; Montgomery
13	Connie Morella (Bethesda)	Republican	January 3, 1987 – January 3, 2003	100th 101st 102nd 103rd 104th 105th 106th 107th	Elected in 1986. Re-elected in 1988. Re-elected in 1990. Re-elected in 1992. Re-elected in 1994. Re-elected in 1996. Re-elected in 1998. Re-elected in 2000. Lost re-election.	1983–1993; Montgomery
13	Connie Morella (Bethesda)	Republican	January 3, 1987 – January 3, 2003	100th 101st 102nd 103rd 104th 105th 106th 107th	Elected in 1986. Re-elected in 1988. Re-elected in 1990. Re-elected in 1992. Re-elected in 1994. Re-elected in 1996. Re-elected in 1998. Re-elected in 2000. Lost re-election.	1993–2003; Montgomery
14	Chris Van Hollen (Kensington)	Democratic	January 3, 2003 – January 3, 2017	108th 109th 110th 111th 112th 113th 114th	Elected in 2002. Re-elected in 2004. Re-elected in 2006. Re-elected in 2008. Re-elected in 2010. Re-elected in 2012. Re-elected in 2014. Retired to run for U.S. Senator.	2003–2013 Montgomery, Prince George's
14	Chris Van Hollen (Kensington)	Democratic	January 3, 2003 – January 3, 2017	108th 109th 110th 111th 112th 113th 114th	Elected in 2002. Re-elected in 2004. Re-elected in 2006. Re-elected in 2008. Re-elected in 2010. Re-elected in 2012. Re-elected in 2014. Retired to run for U.S. Senator.	2013–2023 Montgomery, Frederick, Carroll
15	Jamie Raskin (Takoma Park)	Democratic	January 3, 2017 – present	115th 116th 117th 118th 119th	Elected in 2016. Re-elected in 2018. Re-elected in 2020. Re-elected in 2022. Re-elected in 2024. Re-elected in 2026.	2013–2023 Montgomery, Frederick, Carroll
15	Jamie Raskin (Takoma Park)	Democratic	January 3, 2017 – present	115th 116th 117th 118th 119th	Elected in 2016. Re-elected in 2018. Re-elected in 2020. Re-elected in 2022. Re-elected in 2024. Re-elected in 2026.	2023–present Montgomery

== See also ==
- Maryland's congressional districts
- List of United States congressional districts

== Sources ==
- Archives of Maryland Historical List United States Representatives Maryland State Archives
- Martis, Kenneth C. (1989). The Historical Atlas of Political Parties in the United States Congress. New York: Macmillan Publishing Company.
- Martis, Kenneth C. (1982). The Historical Atlas of United States Congressional Districts. New York: Macmillan Publishing Company.
- Congressional Biographical Directory of the United States 1774–present
