= Chevy Chase Section Three, Maryland =

- Village
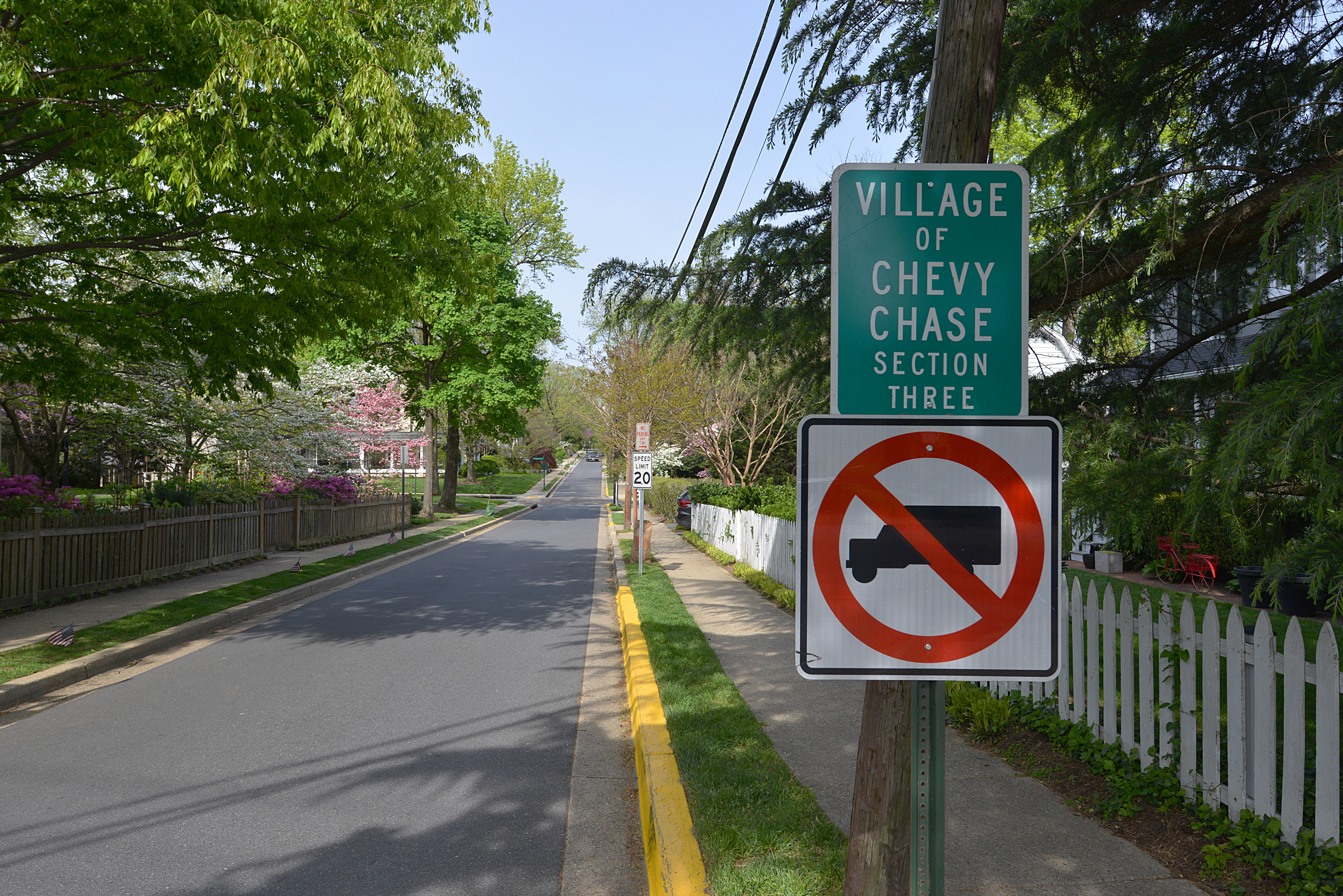

- Logo

- Location in Montgomery County and Maryland
- Coordinates: 38°58′45″N 77°4′23″W
- Country: United States
- State: Maryland
- County: Montgomery
- Special tax district: 1916
- Incorporated: June 24, 1982

Area
  - Total: 0.12 sq mi (0.30 km^{2})
  - Land: 0.12 sq mi (0.30 km^{2})
  - Water: 0 sq mi (0.00 km^{2})
- Elevation: 344 ft (105 m)

Population (2020)
  - Total: 802
  - Density: 6,870.6/sq mi (2,652.77/km^{2})
- Time zone: UTC-5 (Eastern (EST))
  - Summer (DST): UTC-4 (EDT)
- ZIP code: 20815 (Chevy Chase)
- Area codes: 240 and 301
- FIPS code: 24-16730
- GNIS feature ID: 1669430
- Website: www.chevychasesection3.org

Chevy Chase Section Three is a village in Montgomery County, Maryland, United States. It was organized as a special tax district in 1916 and incorporated as a village in 1982. The population was 802 at the 2020 census.

It is part of a larger community, colloquially referred to as Chevy Chase, that includes several adjoining settlements in Montgomery County and one neighborhood of Washington, D.C.

== Geography ==
Chevy Chase Section Three is located in southern Montgomery County at 38°58′45″N 77°4′23″W (38.979043, -77.072948). It is bordered by the town of Chevy Chase to the west, Chevy Chase Section Five to the north, Martin's Additions to the east, and Chevy Chase Village to the south. It is less than one mile northwest of the border with the District of Columbia and 5 miles (8 km) northwest of downtown Washington.

According to the U.S. Census Bureau, the village has an area of 0.12 square miles (0.31 km^{2}), all land. The town is in the watershed of Rock Creek. There are 280 residential lots in Section 3, and the village also contains the Chevy Chase United Methodist Church.

== Demographics ==
Historical population
Census	Pop.	Note	%±
1990	2,078		—
2000	773		−62.8%
2010	760		−1.7%
2020	802		5.5%
U.S. Decennial Census

=== Racial and ethnic composition ===
Chevy Chase Section Three village, Maryland – Racial and ethnic composition Note: the US Census treats Hispanic/Latino as an ethnic category. This table excludes Latinos from the racial categories and assigns them to a separate category. Hispanics/Latinos may be of any race.
Race / Ethnicity (NH = Non-Hispanic)	Pop 2000	Pop 2010	Pop 2020	% 2000	% 2010	% 2020
White alone (NH)	699	675	660	90.43%	88.82%	82.29%
Black or African American alone (NH)	3	9	10	0.39%	1.18%	1.25%
Native American or Alaska Native alone (NH)	0	1	1	0.00%	0.13%	0.12%
Asian alone (NH)	13	20	27	1.68%	2.63%	3.37%
Native Hawaiian or Pacific Islander alone (NH)	0	0	0	0.00%	0.00%	0.00%
Other race alone (NH)	3	5	4	0.39%	0.66%	0.50%
Mixed race or Multiracial (NH)	13	20	46	1.68%	2.63%	5.74%
Hispanic or Latino (any race)	42	30	54	5.43%	3.95%	6.73%
Total	773	760	802	100.00%	100.00%	100.00%

=== 2010 census ===
As of the census of 2010, 760 people resided in the village. The population density was 6,333.3 inhabitants per square mile (2,445.3/km^{2}). There were 278 housing units at an average density of 2,316.7 per square mile (894.5/km^{2}). The racial makeup of the village was 92.1% White, 1.3% African American, 0.1% Native American, 2.6% Asian, 0.7% from other races, and 3.2% from two or more races. Hispanic or Latino of any race were 3.9% of the population.

There were 271 households, of which 41.3% had children under the age of 18 living with them, 73.4% were married couples living together, 7.7% had a female householder with no husband present, 1.1% had a male householder with no wife present, and 17.7% were non-families. The average household size was 2.80; but 15.5% consisted of one person, and 9.5% of one person 65 years of age or older.

The population included 223 families whose average size was 3.11.

The median age in the village was 43.8 years. 28.7% of residents were under the age of 18; 4.1% were between the ages of 18 and 24; 18.7% were from 25 to 44; 28.2% were from 45 to 64; and 20.3% were 65 years of age or older. The gender makeup of the village was 47.0% male and 53.0% female.

=== 2000 census ===
At the 2000 census, the median household income was $150,000, and the median family income was $162,659. Males had a median income of $100,000 versus $60,313 for females. The per capita income for the village was $76,392. About 0.9% of families and 1.3% of the population were below the poverty line, including none of those under the age of eighteen or sixty-five or over.

== Law and government ==
Chevy Chase Section Three has a five-member village council elected by the residents. The village also falls under the jurisdiction of the Montgomery County Council.

== Education ==
Residents are served by the Montgomery County Public Schools. Residents are zoned to Rosemary Hills Elementary School (PreK-2) Chevy Chase Elementary School (3–5), Silver Creek Middle School and Bethesda-Chevy Chase High School.

== Transportation ==
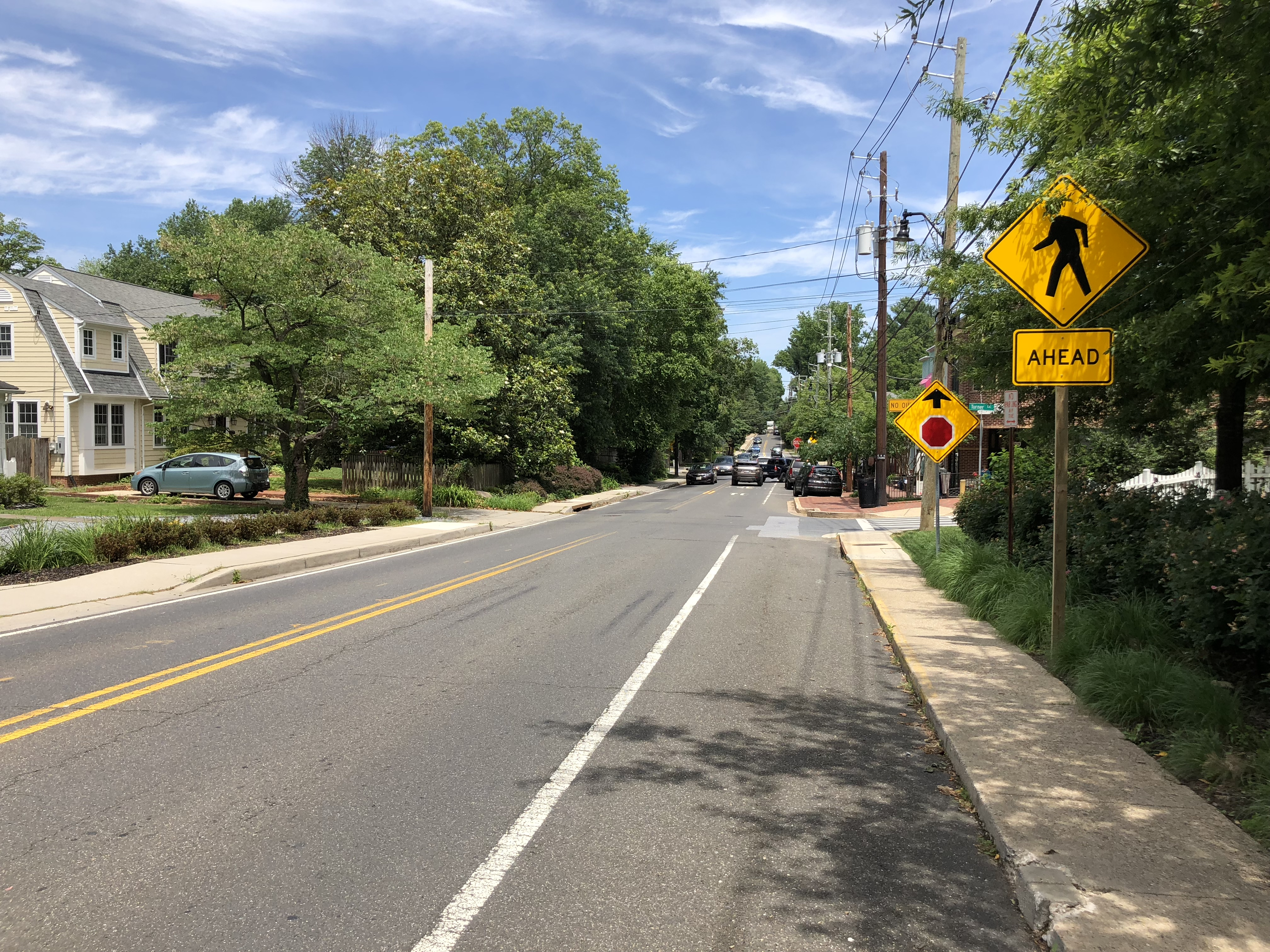
MD 186 northbound in Chevy Chase Section Three

Maryland Route 186 (Brookville Road) which traverses the east edge of the village from south to north. Maryland Route 185 (Connecticut Avenue) follows the west edge of the village corporate limits in a similar orientation.
