= Bethesda-Chevy Chase =

Bethesda-Chevy Chase can refer to:

- The Bethesda-Chevy Chase sub-area, consisting of the neighboring census locations of Bethesda and Chevy Chase, Maryland
- Bethesda-Chevy Chase High School
