= Chevy Chase Village, Maryland =

- Town
- Chevy Chase Village
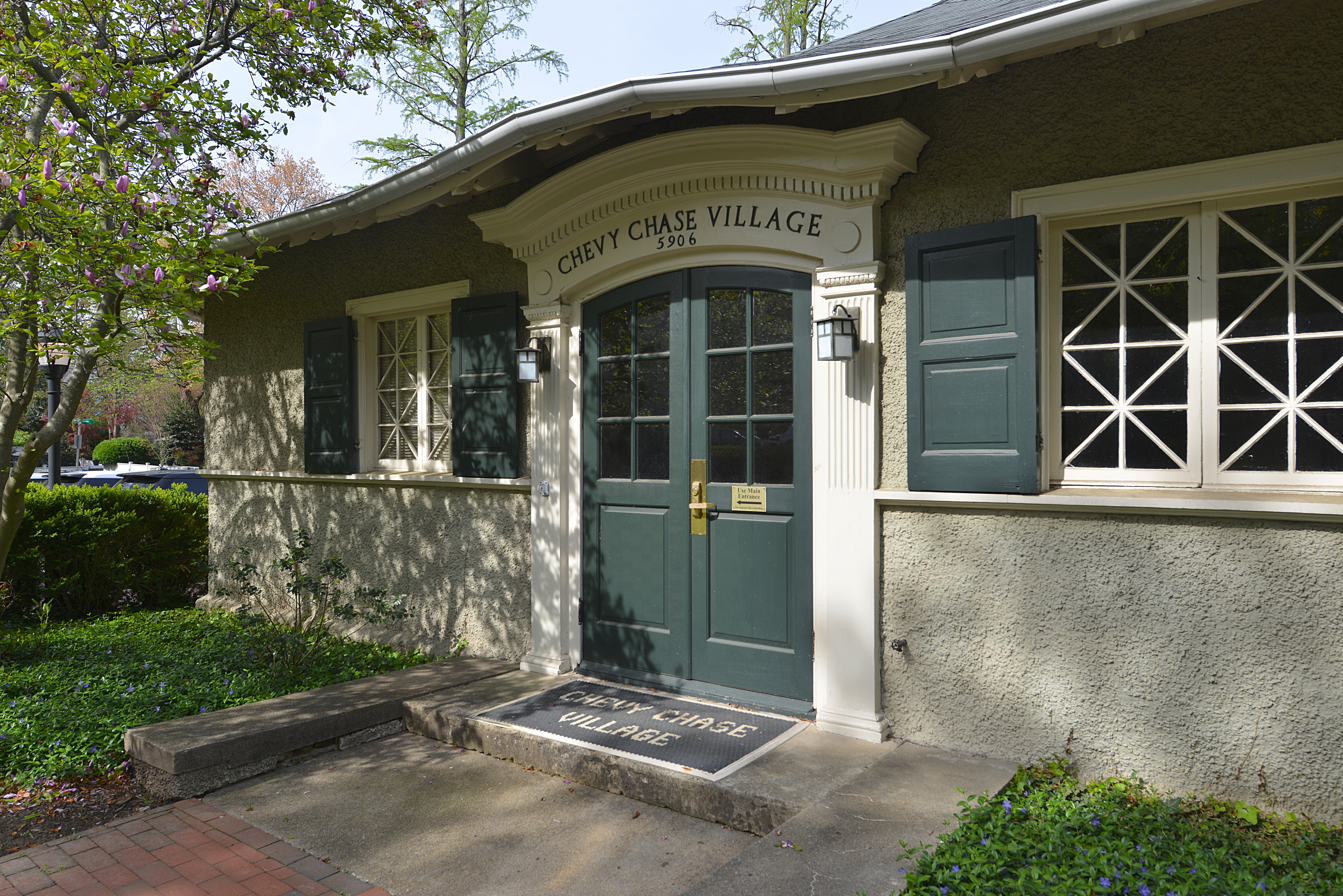

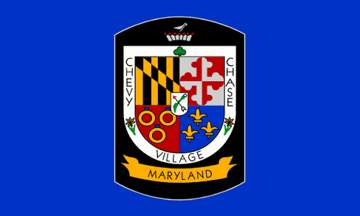
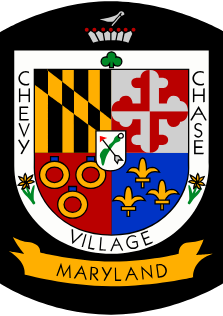
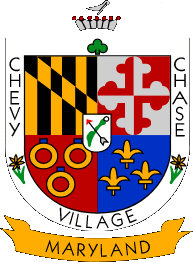
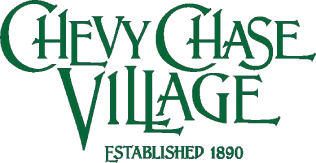
- Flag Seal Coat of arms Logo

- Location of Chevy Chase Village within Montgomery County, Maryland (click to enlarge)
- Coordinates: 38°58′11″N 77°04′46″W
- Country: United States
- State: Maryland
- County: Montgomery
- Incorporated: 1910

Government
  - Village manager: Shana R. Davis-Cook

Area
  - Total: 0.42 sq mi (1.09 km^{2})
  - Land: 0.42 sq mi (1.09 km^{2})
  - Water: 0 sq mi (0.00 km^{2})
- Elevation: 345 ft (105 m)

Population (2020)
  - Total: 2,049
  - Density: 4,883.3/sq mi (1,885.46/km^{2})
- Time zone: UTC-5 (EST)
  - Summer (DST): UTC-4 (EDT)
- ZIP code: 20815
- Area code: 301
- FIPS code: 24-16787
- GNIS feature ID: 2390790
- Website: www.chevychasevillagemd.gov

Chevy Chase Village is an incorporated municipality in Montgomery County, Maryland, United States, bordering Washington, D.C. The population was 2,049 as of the 2020 census. As of 2017, the village was the wealthiest municipality in Maryland, per capita, with a median income of over $250,000, the highest income bracket listed by the census bureau, and a median home value of $1,823,800.

Chevy Chase Village includes 727 housing units. It is known for its speed limit enforcement actions, which produce 24% of its annual revenue.

The village is part of a larger community, colloquially referred to as Chevy Chase, that includes several adjoining settlements in Montgomery County and one neighborhood of Washington.

Chevy Chase Village is the location of the Chevy Chase Club, a private country club with an initiation fee of over $50,000.

== History ==
In the 1890s, a real estate syndicate led by Francis G. Newlands bought more than 1,700 acres in upper Northwest D.C. and southern Montgomery County and began to develop a streetcar suburb he dubbed Chevy Chase.

Newlands' Chevy Chase Land Company divided the Maryland land into subdivisions; Sections 1, 1a, and 2 became known as the Village of Chevy Chase. In 1914, Village residents sought and received state sanction as a special taxing area. It was incorporated in 1951.

The village was created to be all-white; it remains overwhelmingly so more than a century later.

== Geography ==
Chevy Chase Village is located along the southern edge of Montgomery County. It is bordered to the southeast by the Chevy Chase neighborhood of Washington, D.C., to the southwest by Friendship Heights Village, to the west by Somerset, to the northwest by the Chevy Chase Club, to the north by the town of Chevy Chase Section Three, and to the northeast by Martin's Additions.

The town has total area of 0.42 square miles (1.09 km^{2}), all land. The town is in the Potomac River watershed, with the west part of the town draining to the Little Falls Branch, and the east part draining to a tributary of Rock Creek.

== Demographics ==
Historical population
Census	Pop.	Note	%±
1960	2,405		—
1970	2,265		−5.8%
1980	2,118		−6.5%
1990	749		−64.6%
2000	2,043		172.8%
2010	1,953		−4.4%
2020	2,049		4.9%
U.S. Decennial Census

=== Racial and ethnic composition ===
Chevy Chase Village town, Maryland – Racial and ethnic composition Note: the US Census treats Hispanic/Latino as an ethnic category. This table excludes Latinos from the racial categories and assigns them to a separate category. Hispanics/Latinos may be of any race.
Race / Ethnicity (NH = Non-Hispanic)	Pop 2000	Pop 2010	Pop 2020	% 2000	% 2010	% 2020
White alone (NH)	1,924	1,825	1,790	94.18%	93.45%	87.36%
Black or African American alone (NH)	14	10	4	0.69%	0.51%	0.20%
Native American or Alaska Native alone (NH)	0	2	1	0.00%	0.10%	0.05%
Asian alone (NH)	33	31	45	1.62%	1.59%	2.20%
Native Hawaiian or Pacific Islander alone (NH)	0	0	0	0.00%	0.00%	0.00%
Other race alone (NH)	11	9	7	0.54%	0.46%	0.34%
Mixed race or Multiracial (NH)	26	22	103	1.27%	1.13%	5.03%
Hispanic or Latino (any race)	35	54	99	1.71%	2.76%	4.83%
Total	2,043	1,953	2,049	100.00%	100.00%	100.00%

=== 2020 census ===
As of the 2020 census, there were 2,049 people living in the town. The median age was 48.8 years. 27.0% of residents were under the age of 18 and 26.3% were 65 years of age or older. For every 100 females, there were 93.7 males, and for every 100 females age 18 and over, there were 92.9 males age 18 and over.

100.0% of residents lived in urban areas, while 0.0% lived in rural areas.

There were 697 households, of which 39.0% had children under the age of 18 living in them. Of all households, 84.2% were married-couple households, 4.6% were households with a male householder and no spouse or partner present, and 10.3% were households with a female householder and no spouse or partner present. About 10.2% of all households were made up of individuals, and 7.7% had someone living alone who was 65 years of age or older.

There were 727 housing units, of which 4.1% were vacant. The homeowner vacancy rate was 1.2% and the rental vacancy rate was 2.8%.

=== 2010 census ===
As of the census of 2010, there were 1,953 people, 697 households, and 609 families living in the town. The population density was 4,650.0 inhabitants per square mile (1,795.4/km^{2}). There were 726 housing units at an average density of 1,728.6 per square mile (667.4/km^{2}). The racial makeup of the town was 95.9% White, 0.6% African American, 0.2% Native American, 1.6% Asian, 0.5% from other races, and 1.3% from two or more races. Hispanic or Latino of any race were 2.8% of the population.

There were 697 households, of which 36.9% had children under the age of 18 living with them, 82.2% were married couples living together, 3.9% had a female householder with no husband present, 1.3% had a male householder with no wife present, and 12.6% were non-families. 11.2% of all households were made up of individuals, and 7% had someone living alone who was 65 years of age or older. The average household size was 2.80 and the average family size was 2.99.

The median age in the town was 49.1 years. 26.4% of residents were under the age of 18; 3.6% were between the ages of 18 and 24; 13.5% were from 25 to 44; 36.3% were from 45 to 64; and 20% were 65 years of age or older. The gender makeup of the town was 48.5% male and 51.5% female.

=== 2000 census ===
As of the census of 2000, there were 2,043 people, 704 households, and 601 families living in the town. The population density was 4,943.6 inhabitants per square mile (1,908.7/km^{2}). There were 718 housing units at an average density of 1,737.4 per square mile (670.8/km^{2}). The racial makeup of the town was 95.64% White, 0.69% African American, 1.62% Asian, 0.59% from other races, and 1.47% from two or more races. Hispanic or Latino of any race were 1.71% of the population.

There were 704 households, out of which 43.3% had children under the age of 18 living with them, 79.5% were married couples living together, 4.7% had a female householder with no husband present, and 14.5% were non-families. 12.5% of all households were made up of individuals, and 8.9% had someone living alone who was 65 years of age or older. The average household size was 2.90 and the average family size was 3.11 people per household.

In the town, the population was spread out, with 29.0% under the age of 18, 4.0% from 18 to 24, 14.5% from 25 to 44, 38.2% from 45 to 64, and 14.2% who were 65 years of age or older. The median age was 46 years. For every 100 females, there were 98.7 males. For every 100 females age 18 and over, there were 90.2 males.

The median income for a household in the town was in excess of $200,000, as is the median income for a family. Males had a median income of over $100,000 versus $76,067 for females. The per capita income for the town was $95,174. About 1.3% of families and 2.0% of the population were below the poverty line, including 2.8% of those under age 18 and none of those age 65 or over.

== Government ==
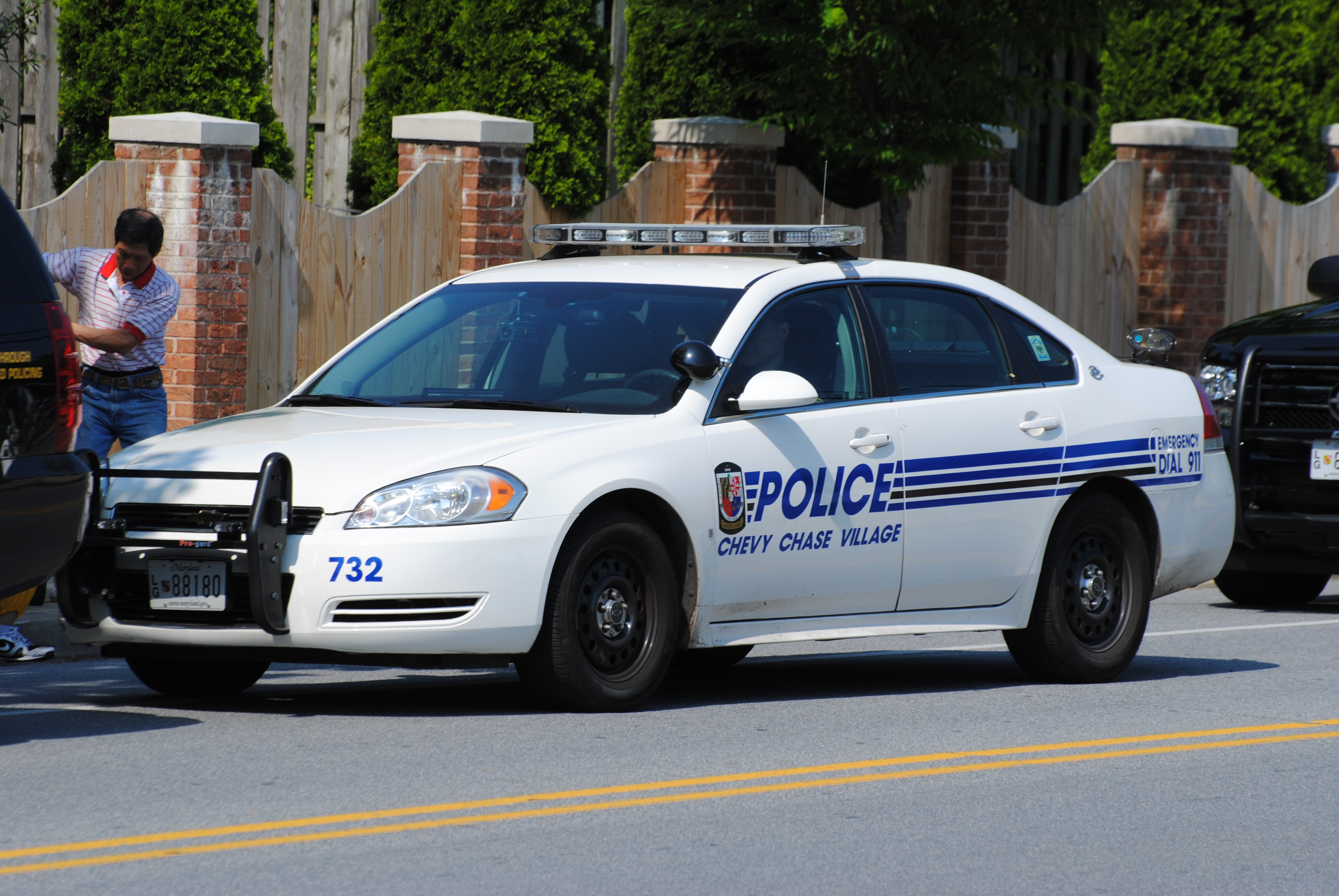
CCVPD car

The village is managed by a board of managers, which consists of seven elected officials.

The village has its own police department.

As of 2017, about 46% of the village's revenue came from income taxes, 20% from property taxes, and 24% from citations from speed limit enforcement along Connecticut Avenue, a commuter route that runs through the village.

== Transportation ==
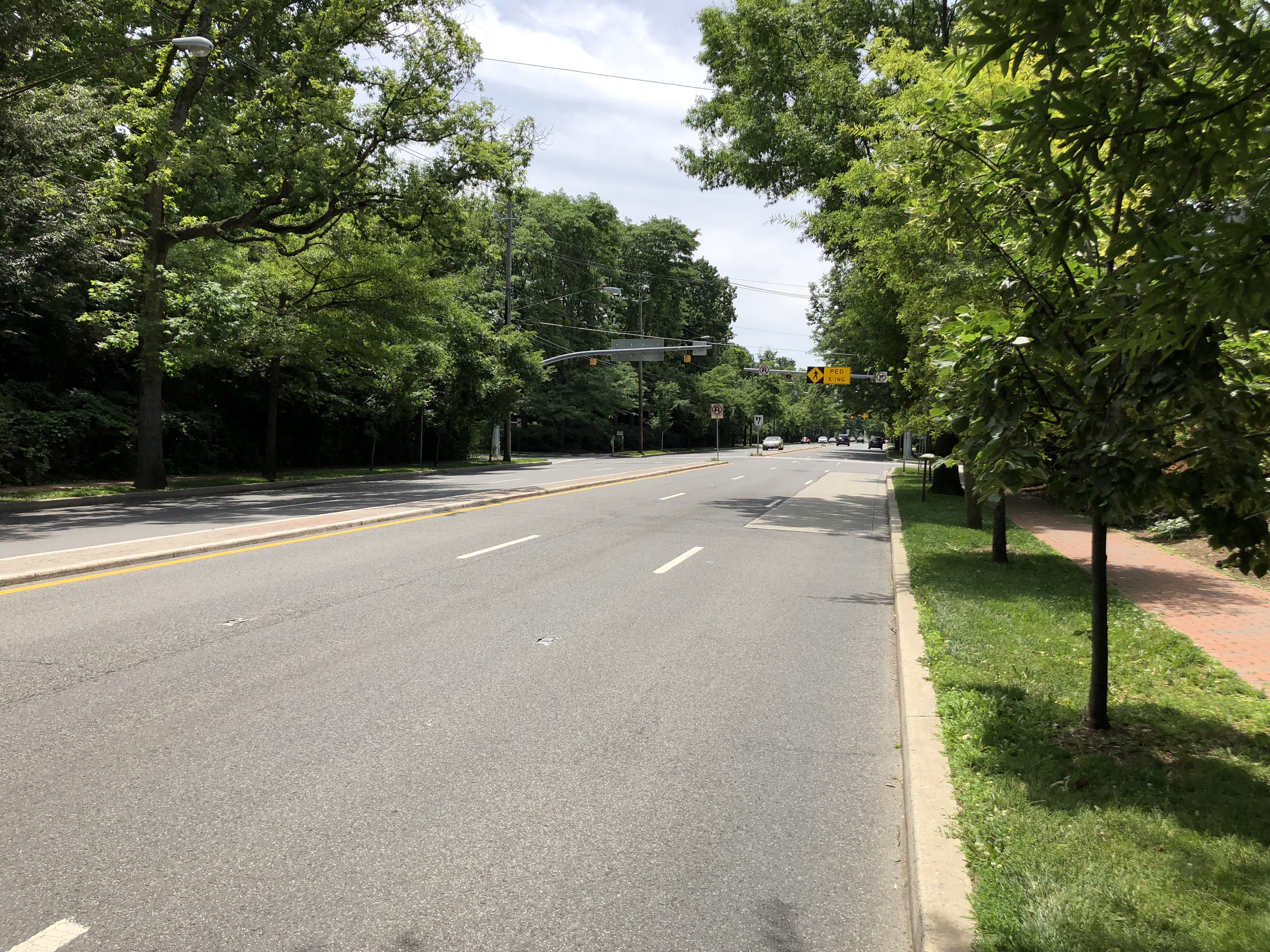
MD 185 (Connecticut Avenue) southbound in Chevy Chase Village

Two state highways run through Chevy Chase Village: Maryland Route 185 (Connecticut Avenue), which extends north past Interstate 495 (the Capital Beltway) and south to Washington, D.C.; and Maryland Route 186 (Brookville Road), a minor local connector that parallels MD 185 to the east.

== Education ==
Chevy Chase Village is served by the Montgomery County Public Schools system.

Residents are zoned to Rosemary Hills Elementary School (PreK-2) (Unincorporated Montgomery County) and Chevy Chase Elementary School (3-6) (in the town of Chevy Chase). Some residents are zoned to Somerset Elementary School (K-5) (in Somerset, Maryland.

All residents are zoned to Westland Middle School and Bethesda-Chevy Chase High School, located in unincorporated Montgomery County.

== Notable people ==
=== Current residents ===
- Ann Brashares - author
- Marvin Kalb - journalist
- Chris Matthews - commentator
- Jerome Powell - former chairman and current member of the Federal Reserve Board of Governors
- John Roberts - Chief Justice of the United States
- George Will - commentator

=== Former residents ===
- David Brinkley - journalist
- Sandra Day O'Connor - United States Supreme Court justice; lived in Chevy Chase Village until 2005
- Mark Shields - political columnist
