= Chevy Chase View, Maryland =

- Town
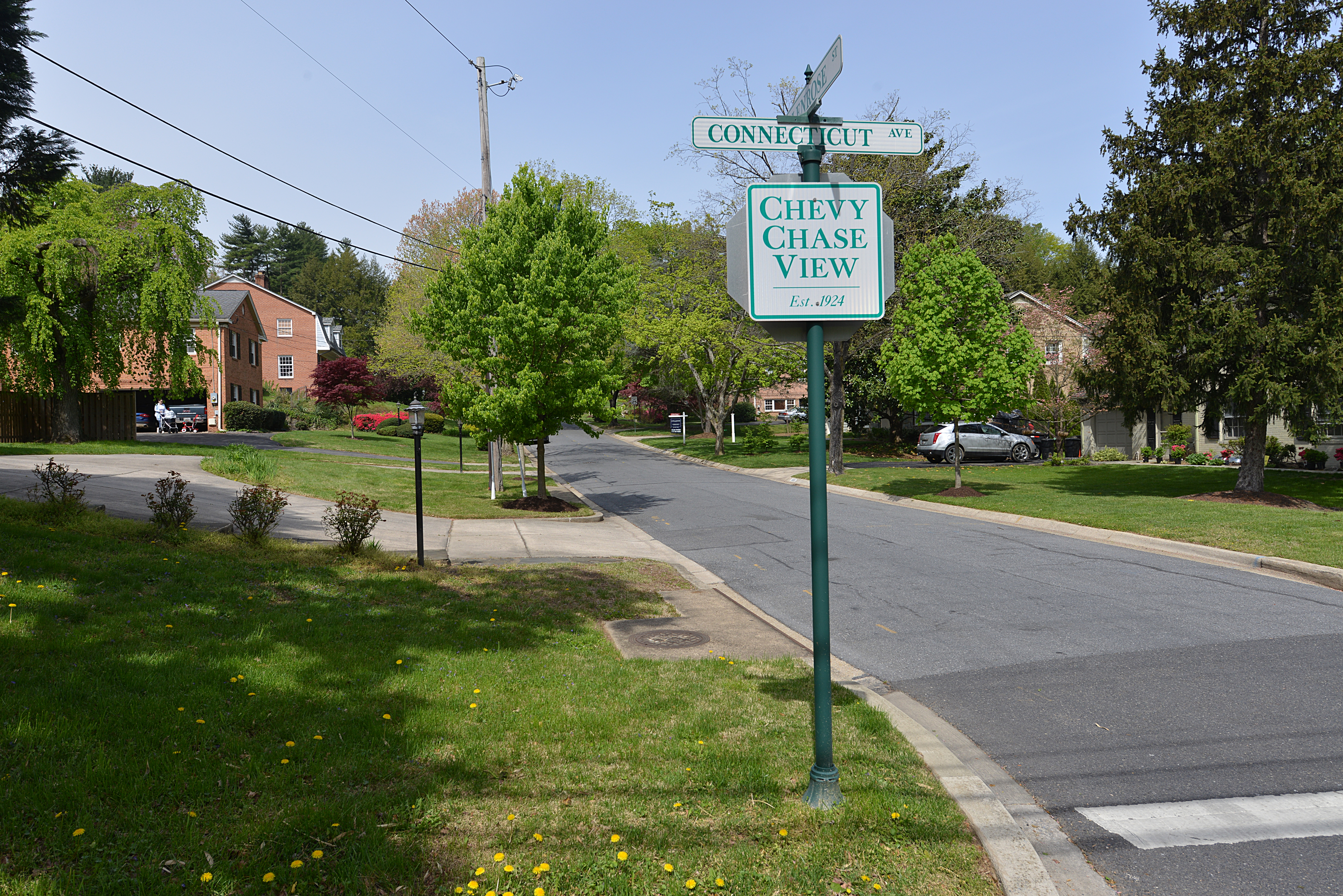

- Logo

- Location of Chevy Chase View, Maryland
- Coordinates: 39°01′09″N 77°04′52″W
- Country: United States
- State: Maryland
- County: Montgomery
- Special Tax District: 1924
- Incorporated: October 28, 1993

Area
  - Total: 0.27 sq mi (0.69 km^{2})
  - Land: 0.27 sq mi (0.69 km^{2})
  - Water: 0 sq mi (0.00 km^{2})
- Elevation: 322 ft (98 m)

Population (2020)
  - Total: 1,005
  - Density: 3,746.3/sq mi (1,446.46/km^{2})
- Time zone: UTC-5 (Eastern (EST))
  - Summer (DST): UTC-4 (EDT)
- ZIP code: 20895
- Area codes: 240 and 301
- FIPS code: 24-16775
- GNIS feature ID: 2390789
- Website: www.chevychaseviewmd.gov

Chevy Chase View is a town in Montgomery County, Maryland, United States. Established as a Special Tax District in 1924, the town was formally incorporated on October 28, 1993. The population was 1,005 at the 2020 census.

== History ==
The origins of the town date to April 18, 1910, when a "Plat of Chevy Chase View" was recorded. Real estate developer Claude Livingstone designed the community the previous year and then conveyed it to Harry E. Smith and John L. Whitmore. Livingstone's design, except for a few minor street changes, has remained largely the same since. In 1924, a special tax district was formed.

On August 3, 1993, the Montgomery County Council unanimously voted to allow residents to vote on whether to incorporate as a town. Residents voted in favor of incorporation in a referendum held on September 21, 1993. The Montgomery County Council certified the results of the referendum, effective October 28, 1993.

== Geography ==
Chevy Chase View is located in southern Montgomery County. It is bordered to the north by the town of Kensington and on all other sides by the unincorporated area of South Kensington. It is 2 miles (3 km) north of the cluster of communities knowns as Chevy Chase.

According to the United States Census Bureau, the town has a total area of 0.27 square miles (0.70 km^{2}), all land.

The town is bisected by Connecticut Avenue, and the Capital Beltway passes 1 mile (1.6 km) to the south. Silver Spring is 4 miles (6 km) to the east, Garrett Park is 2 miles (3 km) to the northwest, and Bethesda is 3 miles (5 km) to the southwest. To the south are Rock Creek Stream Valley Park and North Chevy Chase.

Except for the three houses of worship within its bounds, Chevy Chase View is entirely residential. Its streets are lined by hundred-year-old oaks, maples, and evergreens, plus decorative plantings which the town maintains in its right-of-ways. Housing turnover is slow.

== Demographics ==
Historical population
Census	Pop.	Note	%±
2000	863		—
2010	920		6.6%
2020	1,005		9.2%
U.S. Decennial Census

=== Racial and ethnic composition ===
Chevy Chase View town, Maryland – Racial and ethnic composition Note: the US Census treats Hispanic/Latino as an ethnic category. This table excludes Latinos from the racial categories and assigns them to a separate category. Hispanics/Latinos may be of any race.
Race / Ethnicity (NH = Non-Hispanic)	Pop 2000	Pop 2010	Pop 2020	% 2000	% 2010	% 2020
White alone (NH)	809	837	843	93.74%	90.98%	83.88%
Black or African American alone (NH)	12	20	18	1.39%	2.17%	1.79%
Native American or Alaska Native alone (NH)	0	1	1	0.00%	0.11%	0.10%
Asian alone (NH)	21	18	23	2.43%	1.96%	2.29%
Native Hawaiian or Pacific Islander alone (NH)	0	1	0	0.00%	0.11%	0.00%
Other race alone (NH)	0	0	10	0.00%	0.00%	1.00%
Mixed race or Multiracial (NH)	5	6	36	0.58%	0.65%	3.58%
Hispanic or Latino (any race)	16	37	74	1.85%	4.02%	7.36%
Total	863	920	1,005	100.00%	100.00%	100.00%

=== 2010 census ===
As of the census of 2010, there were 920 people, 298 households, and 250 families living in the town. The population density was 3,285.7 inhabitants per square mile (1,268.6/km^{2}). There were 311 housing units at an average density of 1,110.7 per square mile (428.8/km^{2}). The racial makeup of the town was 94.3% White, 2.2% African American, 0.1% Native American, 2.0% Asian, 0.1% Pacific Islander, and 1.3% from two or more races. Hispanic or Latino of any race were 4.0% of the population.

There were 298 households, of which 42.3% had children under the age of 18 living with them, 76.5% were married couples living together, 6.4% had a female householder with no husband present, 1.0% had a male householder with no wife present, and 16.1% were non-families. 13.1% of all households were made up of individuals, and 6.7% had someone living alone who was 65 years of age or older. The average household size was 3.09 and the average family size was 3.38.

The median age in the town was 44.1 years. 32% of residents were under the age of 18; 4.4% were between the ages of 18 and 24; 15.2% were from 25 to 44; 32% were from 45 to 64; and 16.1% were 65 years of age or older. The gender makeup of the town was 48.5% male and 51.5% female.

=== 2000 census ===
As of the census of 2000, there were 863 people, 303 households, and 232 families living in the town. The population density was 3,274.6 inhabitants per square mile (1,264.3/km^{2}). There were 306 housing units at an average density of 1,161.1 per square mile (448.3/km^{2}). The racial makeup of the town was 95.25% White, 2.43% Asian, 1.85% Hispanic or Latino, and 1.51% African- American.

There were 303 households, out of which 38.6% had children under the age of 18 living with them, 70.6% were married couples living together, 4.3% had a female householder with no husband present, and 23.4% were non-families. 18.8% of all households were made up of individuals. The average household size was 2.85 and the average family size was 3.29.

30.5% of residents were under the age of 18, 3.2% from 18 to 24, 20.0% from 25 to 44, 32.2% from 45 to 64, and 14.0% 65 years of age or older. The median age was 43 years.

The median income for a household in the town was $120,828, and the median income for a family was $139,468. Males had a median income of $100,000 versus $77,899 for females. The per capita income for the town was $58,916. 1.1% of the population and 0.0% of families were below the poverty line.

== Government ==
The town has a town council with a chairman and four councilmembers. The town council maintains its own website, and meets monthly to ensure the maintenance of Chevy Chase View's environment.

== Education ==
Resident students are zoned to schools in the Montgomery County Public Schools district, more specifically to Rosemary Hills Elementary School (PreK–2), North Chevy Chase Elementary School (3–5), Silver Creek Middle School (6–8), and Bethesda-Chevy Chase High School (9–12).

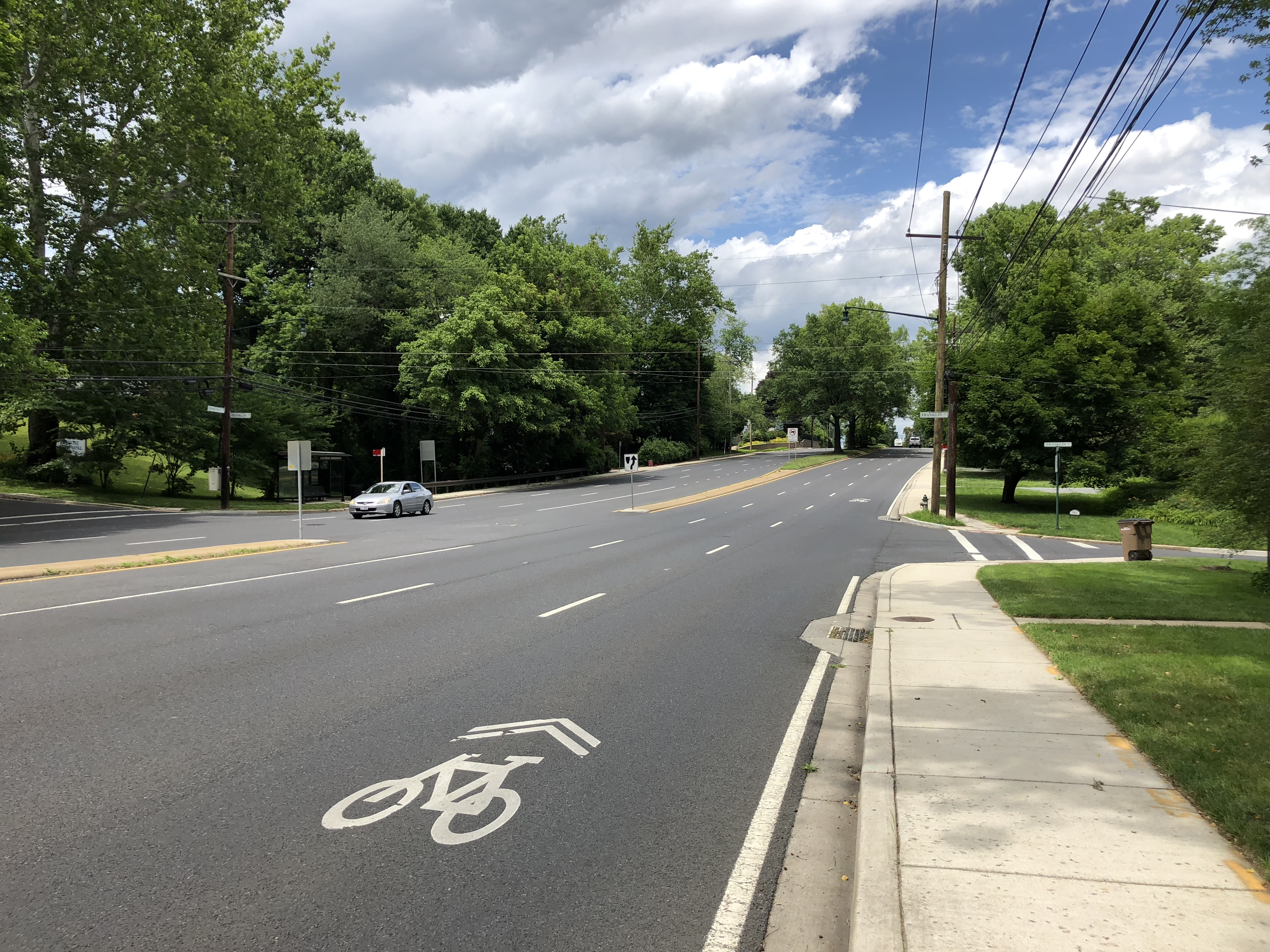
MD 185 northbound in Chevy Chase View

== Transportation ==
The main state highway serving Chevy Chase View is Maryland Route 185 (Connecticut Avenue). MD 185 has an interchange with the nearest Interstate highway, Interstate 495 (the Capital Beltway), just south of the town limits. MD 185 also provides direct access to Washington, D.C.

== See also ==
- Chevy Chase (town), Maryland
- Chevy Chase Village, Maryland
