= Carol Stuart Watson =

American publisher

- Born: Carol Stuart; August 14, 1931; Washington D.C., United States
- Died: January 19, 1986 (aged 54); Bethesda, Maryland, United States
- Education: University of Maryland (1929-32)
- Occupations: Illustrator; Publisher
- Spouse: David Watson

Carol Stuart Watson (August 14, 1931 – January 19, 1986) was an American illustrator and publisher. She was known for her illustrations of calendars, cards, children's books and scientific subjects. As a publisher, she cofounded The Georgetowner and Carriage Trade Publications.

She lived in Rockville, Maryland, and died of lung cancer at the Bethesda Naval Medical Center.

== Early life and education ==
Watson was born at Georgetown Hospital in Washington, D.C. and grew up in Bethesda, Maryland. She graduated from Bethesda-Chevy Chase High School, then earned a bachelor's degree in fine arts and journalism from the University of Maryland.

== Career ==
Watson started her career working at the Washington Times-Herald. In 1954, she co-founded The Georgetowner, a community newspaper in the Georgetown area of Washington, D.C. In 1960 she co-founded Carriage Trade Publications with her husband, David Deshler Watson.

Her illustrations could be seen in the lobbies of companies such as Martin Marietta; at the National Park Visitors Center in Harper’s Ferry, West Virginia; and in the maps of local communities. She was best known for her illustrations that appeared in books such as Where’s Rachel, Hurrah for Arthur! A Mount Vernon Birthday Party, Flower Fables, Hey, ey-ey-Lock – Adventures on the C&O Canal, and Upstairs and Downstairs in a Victorian Doll House.

Watson and her husband ran Carriage Trade Publications until 1979 when she took a position as an illustrator for the Johns Hopkins Applied Physics Laboratory.

== Honors ==
In 1982, Watson won the Printing Industries of America's Graphic Arts Award Competition for her design of Bear Branches Gift Wrap for the Evergreen Press.

== Bibliography ==
- Upstairs & Downstairs In A Victorian Dolls' House (1975)
- Flower Fables (1978)
- Hurrah for Arthur! A Mount Vernon Birthday Party (1982)
