= Maryland Route 186 =

State highway in Montgomery County, Maryland, United States, known as Brookville Road

Maryland Route 186
- Brookville Road
- Maryland Route 186 highlighted in red

Route information
- Maintained by MDSHA
- Length: 1.52 mi (2.45 km)
- Existed: 1927–present

Major junctions
- South end: Western Avenue at the Washington, D.C. border
- North end: MD 410 in Chevy Chase

Location
- Country: United States
- State: Maryland
- Counties: Montgomery

Highway system
- Maryland highway system; Interstate; US; State; Scenic Byways
| ← MD 185 | → MD 187 |

Maryland Route 186 (MD 186) is a state highway in Montgomery County in the U.S. state of Maryland. Known as Brookville Road, the highway runs 1.52 miles (2.45 km) from the District of Columbia boundary at Western Avenue to MD 410 within Chevy Chase. MD 186 passes through an affluent, mainly residential area in its course through the many incorporated and unincorporated areas of Chevy Chase. Brookville Road once connected Tenleytown with what is now MD 97 north of Silver Spring. MD 186 was paved over most of its course by 1910. The northernmost part of the highway was paved when MD 410 was built in the late 1920s.

== Route description ==
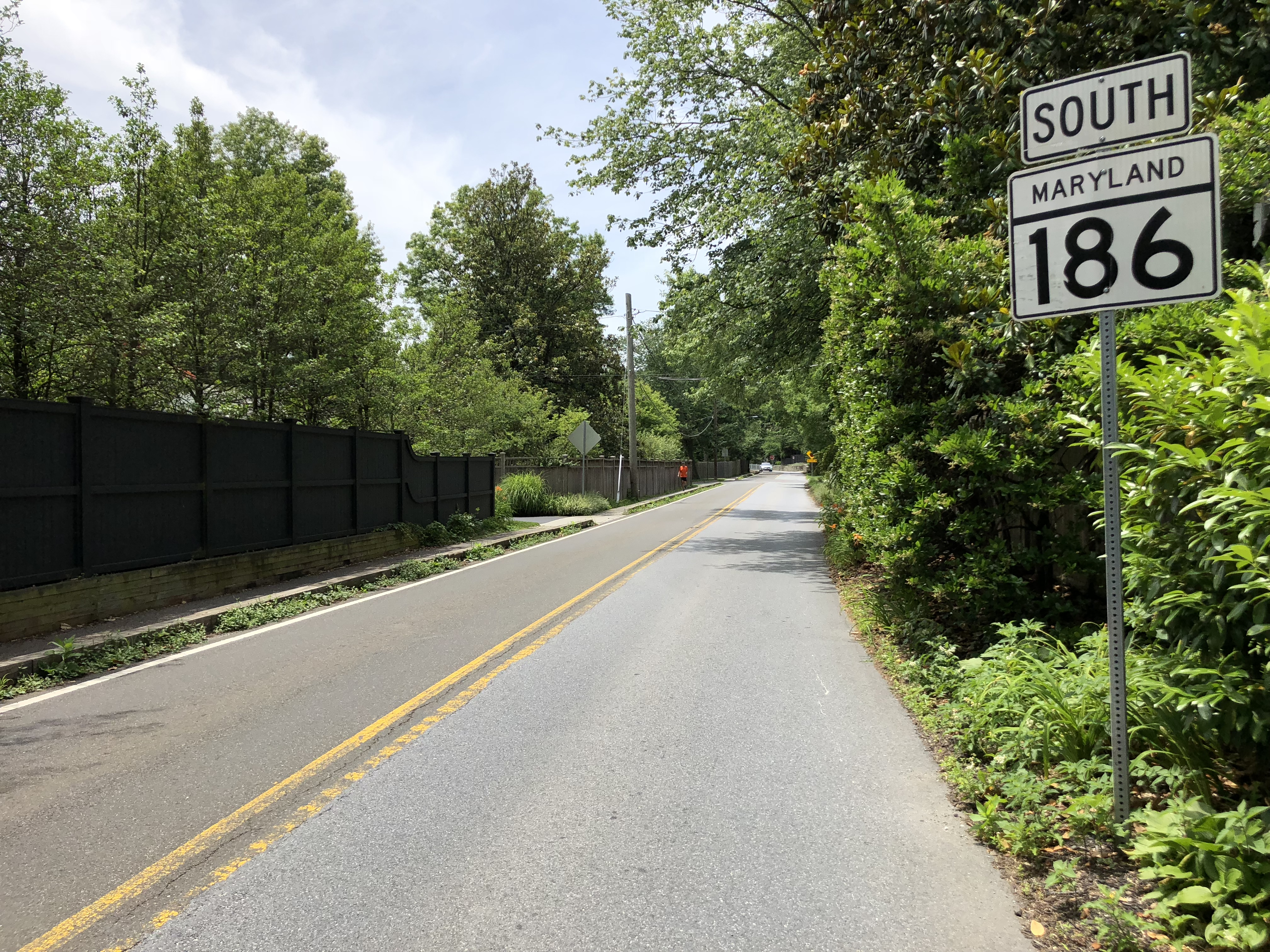
View south along MD 186 at Oxford Street in Chevy Chase Village

MD 186 begins at Western Avenue on the District of Columbia boundary. The intersection is one block northeast of Chevy Chase Circle, where Western Avenue intersects Connecticut Avenue. MD 186 heads north along a narrow two-lane undivided street in the town of Chevy Chase Village. The highway has its first and second all-way stops at Melrose Street and Oxford Street, respectively. MD 186 meets the northern end of Broad Branch Road just south of its third all-way stop at Primrose Street. At Quincy Street, the highway begins to follow the boundary between Chevy Chase Village on the west and the village of Martin's Additions on the east. The route follows the boundary to Bradley Lane, which becomes MD 191 west of MD 185 (Connecticut Avenue). North of Bradley Lane, MD 186 follows the boundary between Martin's Additions and the village of Chevy Chase Section Three on the west. The highway has its fourth and fifth stops at Raymond Street and Taylor Street, respectively; the latter stop is in the middle of one block of commercial buildings on the east. MD 186 enters the village of Chevy Chase Section Five just south of Thornapple Street. The highway leaves the village and enters the unincorporated area of Chevy Chase after its sixth all-way stop at Woodbine Street. Three blocks further, MD 186 reaches its northern terminus at MD 410 (East–West Highway).

== History ==
Brookville Road dates to the 19th century as a connection between the Georgetown and Rockville Turnpike (now Wisconsin Avenue) in Tennallytown and the Union Turnpike, also known as the 7th Street Pike and now MD 97 (Georgia Avenue), north of Silver Spring. The Union Turnpike connected Washington with Brookeville in northern Montgomery County. Disjoint segments of the road's course in the District of Columbia remain as Belt Road between Chevy Chase and Tenleytown. North of MD 186's terminus, the route is followed by modern MD 410 to Rock Creek, then is lost before resuming as Brookville Road in Silver Spring, which ends at Seminary Road west of MD 97. Brookville Road was paved as a 12-foot-wide (3.7 m) macadam road by Montgomery County with state aid from Western Avenue to Thornapple Street by 1910. MD 186 was extended north to MD 410 when that highway was built between 1928 and 1930. Beyond widening and resurfacing, the state highway has not changed since.

== Junction list ==
The entire route is in Montgomery County.

| Location | mi | km | Destinations | Notes |
|---|---|---|---|---|
| Chevy Chase Village | 0.00 | 0.00 | Western Avenue NW to Connecticut Avenue NW | District of Columbia boundary; southern terminus |
| Community of Chevy Chase | 1.52 | 2.45 | MD 410 (East–West Highway) – Bethesda, Silver Spring | Northern terminus |
1.000 mi = 1.609 km; 1.000 km = 0.621 mi
