= Bethesda-Chevy Chase High School =

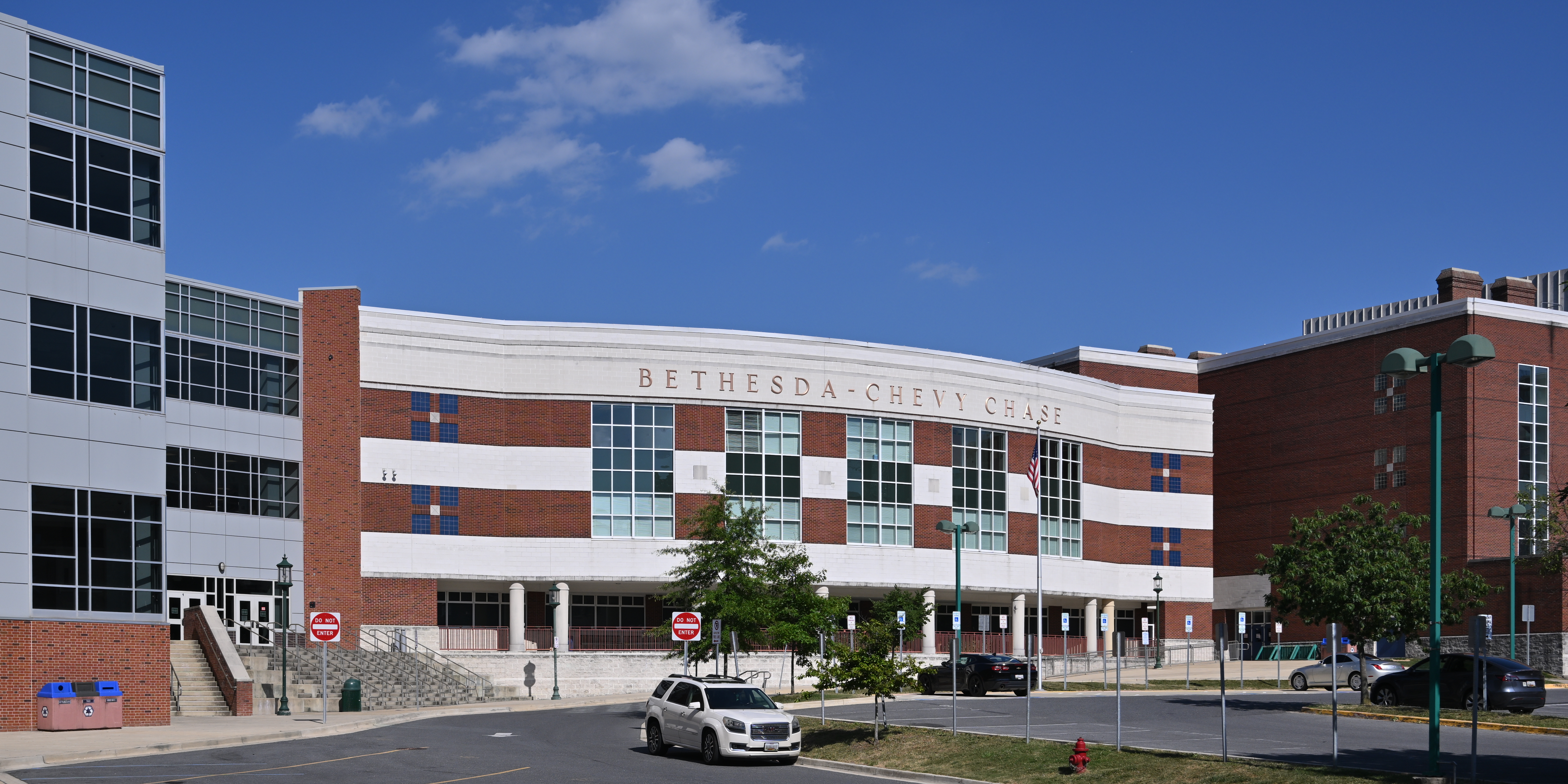

Location
- 4301 East-West Highway; Bethesda, Maryland 20814; United States; 38°59′11″N 77°5′19″W

Information
- Type: Public high school
- Motto: Learn, Think, Serve, Be Responsible
- Established: 1926; 100 years ago
- School district: Montgomery County Public Schools
- CEEB code: 210250
- NCES School ID: 240048000784
- Teaching staff: 136.600 FTE (2023–24)
- Grades: 9–12
- Gender: Co-educational
- Enrollment: 2,369 (2023–24)
- Student to teacher ratio: 17.34:1 (2023–24)
- Campus: Small city
- Colors: Blue and gold
- Athletics conference: MPSSAA 4A
- Mascot: Battlin' Baron
- Rival: Walter Johnson High School, Walt Whitman High School
- Accreditation: MSA, IBO
- Publication: Chips
- Newspaper: The Tattler
- Yearbook: The Pine Tree
- Website: www.montgomeryschoolsmd.org/schools/bcchs

Bethesda-Chevy Chase High School (B-CC) is a public high school in Montgomery County, Maryland. It is located at 4301 East-West Highway, in Bethesda.

Part of the Montgomery County Public Schools system, Bethesda-Chevy Chase serves the Chevy Chase and Bethesda areas including the towns of Chevy Chase, Chevy Chase View, Chevy Chase Village, and Somerset; and the villages of Chevy Chase Section Three, Chevy Chase Section Five, Martin's Additions and North Chevy Chase. It also serves small populations in Silver Spring and Kensington.

== Schools within the Bethesda-Chevy Chase cluster ==
- Westland MS
  - Bethesda ES
  - Somerset ES
  - Rock Creek Forest ES (Spanish immersion)
  - Westbrook ES
- Silver Creek MS
  - Chevy Chase ES (3–5)
  - North Chevy Chase ES (3–5)
  - Rock Creek Forest ES (non-immersion)
  - Rosemary Hills ES (Pre-K–2)

== History ==
=== 20th century ===
Bethesda-Chevy Chase High School was founded as a two-story, 14-room facility on Wilson Lane in 1926. In February 1928, it moved to a newly built 12-room facility at 44th Street and Willow Lane in Chevy Chase. On September 16, 1935, the school opened at its current location on East-West Highway in a 44,995 sq ft (4,180 m^{2}) building designed by Howard Wright Cutler. Its former location became Leland Junior High School.

From 1946 to 1950, the B-CC building was used as the first home of Montgomery Junior College—today's Montgomery College, the county's public community college. During its first school year, the college had about 175 students.

Over the years, new buildings were erected and existing buildings enlarged, including:

- 1936: 36,515 square feet (3,392 m^{2})
- 1950: 49,616 square feet (4,609 m^{2})
- 1952: 22,396 square feet (2,081 m^{2})
- 1959: 32,408 square feet (3,011 m^{2})
- 1966: 29,023 square feet (2,696 m^{2})
- 1970: 20,295 square feet (1,885 m^{2})
- 1975: 8,378 square feet (778 m^{2})
- 1976: 9,616 square feet (893 m^{2})

These additions brought the total school area to 253,242 square feet (23,527 m^{2}).

In the summer of 1994, parents, teachers, administrators, business people and other supporters of B-CC High School formed the Community Coalition for Bethesda-Chevy Chase High School. Its charge was to re-engineer the high school to better suit its increasingly urbanized and cosmopolitan area. CC-B-CC representatives were encouraged to think broadly and innovatively to create programs that would lead B-CC High School and MCPS into the twenty-first century.

Because of this effort, from 1999 to 2002, B-CC High School underwent a $41 million comprehensive modernization project that, among other things, combined the historic 1935 and 1936 structures into one building. It had a 213,499 sq ft (19,835 m^{2}) addition, 94,716 sq ft (8,799.4 m^{2}) of renovations of the original 1935, 1936 and part of the 1950 buildings, and 158,526 sq ft (14,728 m^{2}) of demolitions of most of the 1950 building, 1952, 1959, 1966, 1970, 1975, and 1976 buildings. This brought the campus area to 308,215 sq ft (28,634 m^{2}).

=== 21st century ===
In 2018, B-CC opened a 94,407 sq ft (8,770.7 m^{2}) addition with 34 new classrooms, a new dance studio, and more offices, bringing the campus to a total of 402,622 sq ft (37,404.8 m^{2}) of area.

== Facilities ==
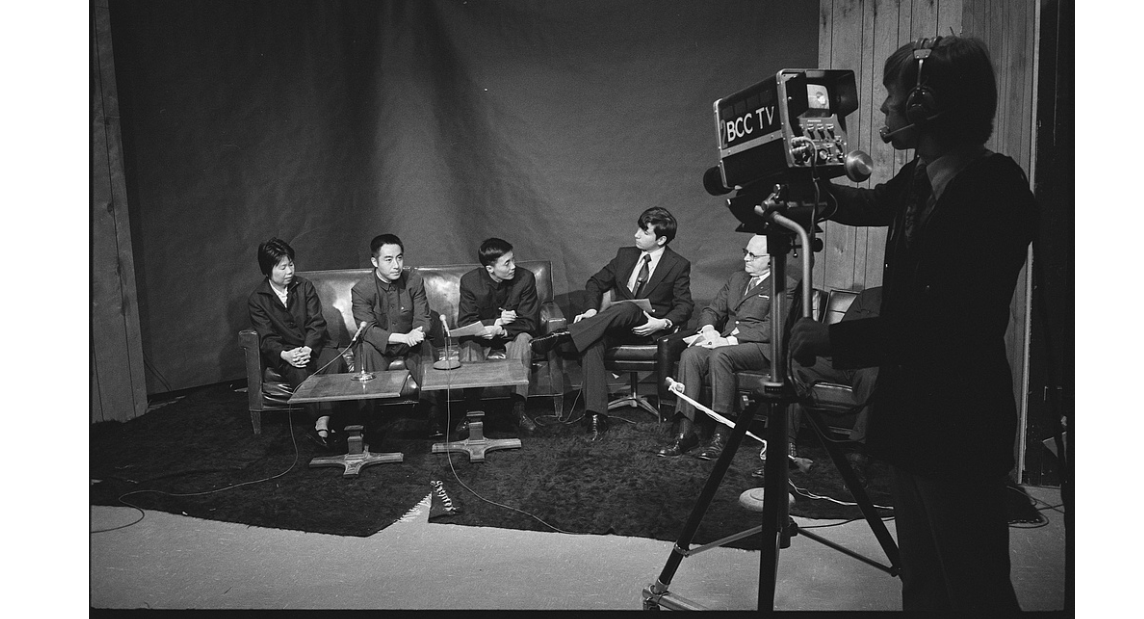
Bethesda-Chevy Chase High School television studio in 1972

The school has 80 classrooms, a media center with 30 computer workstations and TV studio and media production facilities, a greenhouse, a music laboratory and choral room, two gymnasiums and a weight training room, a 900-seat auditorium, and a cafeteria that serves breakfast and lunch. B-CC also has two "firsts" among Montgomery County Public Schools: a Cyber Café, opened in March 2003, and a Language Lab, installed in the summer of 2004. In 2008, B-CC High School was equipped with 80 digital classroom Promethean boards.

== Activities and academics ==
As of 2024, B-CC is the 10th-ranked high school in Maryland and the 590th-ranked nationally, according to U.S News and World Report. B-CC students average a score of 1203 on the SAT, with 610 in verbal and 593 in math. In 2013, the school's physics team won the state championship.

In the 2022-23 school year, B-CC High School offered over 110 clubs and student organizations.

== Athletics ==
B-CC fields more than 25 athletic teams, known as the Battlin' Barons.

=== Fall sports ===
- Cheerleading
- Cross country (girls): Maryland 4A state champions, 2011, 2012, 2024, 2025
- Cross country (boys): Maryland 3A state champions, 2007
- Field hockey: State champions 1988, 1990, 1992, 1994, 1995, 1996, 1997, 1998, 1999, 2000, 2001, 2002, and 2004
- Football
- Golf
- Poms: Mid-Atlantic Champions, 2013
- Rowing (boys) (club sport)
- Rowing (girls) (club sport)
- Soccer (boys): State champions, 1980, 1982, 1984, 2001, 2007, 2017
- Soccer (girls): State champions, 2001, 2004; State, 2008, 2009; Ranked 48th in the nation; State champions, 2010, 2011
- Sailing (club sport)
- Tennis (girls):
- Volleyball (girls)
- Handball

=== Winter sports ===
- Basketball (boys): State champions: 1959, 1984
- Basketball (girls)
- Bocce: Maryland state champions, 2013, 2015, 2016
- Cheerleading
- Ice hockey (club sport): MSHL State champions: 2021
- Indoor track (girls): State champions, 1980, 2008
- Indoor track (boys)
- Poms
- Swimming and diving
- Wrestling

=== Spring sports ===
- Baseball
- Lacrosse (boys)
- Lacrosse (girls)
- Outdoor track & field
- Rowing (boys) (club sport)
  - State champions: 2009, 2010, 2011, 2012, 2013, 2014, 2015, 2016, 2017, 2019, 2022
  - National finalists: 2000 (2nd), 2001 (1st), 2003, 2004 (3rd), 2005, 2009, 2010, 2011, 2012, 2016, 2017 (1st), 2018, 2019 (3rd), 2022 (1st)
- Rowing (girls) (club sport)
  - State champions: 2009, 2010, 2012, 2013, 2014, 2015, 2016, 2017
  - National finalists: 2002 (2nd), 2003, 2004 (1st), 2005, 2007 (3rd), 2008, 2012 (3rd), 2013, 2014, 2015 (1st), 2016, 2017, 2019 (3rd), 2018, 2022
- Sailing (club sport): 2021 ISSA Fleet Race National Championship: 5th overall, 1st public school
- Softball
- Tennis (boys): State champions: 2015 (doubles);
- Volleyball (boys)
- Volleyball (coed)
- Ultimate frisbee (club sport): State champions: 2014, 2015, 2016

The gymnastics team was state champions in 2004 and from 2007–2010; the county discontinued the sport in 2026.

=== Rivalries ===
B-CC's closest athletic rivalry is with Walt Whitman; games between the schools are sometimes dubbed "Battle of Bethesda." It also has a growing rivalry with the other public school in Bethesda, Walter Johnson.

== Notable alumni ==
B-CC has had many notable alumni in politics, business, academia, sports, and media.

=== Government and politics ===
- Andy Billig, Washington state senator from the 3rd District
- David Boren, U.S. Senator and Governor of Oklahoma; President of University of Oklahoma
- Chet Culver, Governor of Iowa, 2007-2011
- Howard A. Denis, Maryland State Senator, 1977–1994
- Daniel R. Domínguez, federal judge
- William Frick, member of the Maryland House of Delegates, 2007–2019
- Wallace E. Hutton (born 1929), member of the Maryland House of Delegates
- L. Craig Johnstone, U.S. Ambassador to Algeria, and Deputy-High Commissioner for Refugees
- Peter Jo Messitte, federal judge
- Peter Navarro, Counselor to the President of the United States
- Neal Potter, county executive of Montgomery County, 1990–1994
- Milan Dale Smith Jr. (born May 19, 1942), United States Circuit Judge of the United States Court of Appeals for the Ninth Circuit
- Ruy Teixeira, political scientist
- Roger W. Titus, federal judge

=== Business ===
- Philip J. Kaplan, tech entrepreneur
- Frank Radice, media businessman, former president of National Academy of Television Arts & Sciences
- Jonathan I. Schwartz, CEO of Sun Microsystems

=== Academia ===
- Alfredo Jocelyn-Holt Letelier, Chilean historian
- John D. Hoffman, Manhattan Project chemist
- David Stuart, Mayanist scholar, youngest recipient of MacArthur Fellowship "genius grant"

=== Sports ===
- Mitchell Bobrow, karate fighter, 1969 All American Karate Grand Champion Madison Square Garden
- Moise Fokou, football player, linebacker for NFL's Tennessee Titans
- Frank Funk, MLB player (Cleveland Indians, Milwaukee Braves)
- Bill Guckeyson, 1937 NFL Draft; killed as a fighter pilot in World War II; namesake of the school's athletic field
- Collin Martin, former Major League Soccer midfielder for D.C. United
- Elliana Pogrebinsky, figure skater
- Joe Urso, arena football player (Baltimore Blackbirds, Chesapeake Tide, Maryland Maniacs)
- Ethan White, former Major League Soccer defender for D.C. United

=== Arts and entertainment ===
- Martin Blank, playwright, screenwriter, and producer
- Tommy Davidson, comedian, cast member of TV series In Living Color
- John Duffey, bluegrass musician
- Neal Fredericks, cinematographer, The Blair Witch Project
- Robert Gordon, rockabilly singer
- Si Kahn, singer and songwriter
- Daniel Kessler, guitarist and founder of the band Interpol
- David Simon, creator and executive producer of HBO series The Wire
- Arleen Sorkin, actress, screenwriter, television presenter and comedian
- Richard K. Spottswood, musicologist and actor
- Becky Stark, actress and lead singer of Lavender Diamond
- Daniel Stern, actor, appeared in two Home Alone movies
- Vicky Tiel, fashion designer
- Stefanie Zadravec, playwright

=== Media and journalism ===
- Rita Braver, TV broadcaster, CBS News correspondent
- John Harwood, Chief White House correspondent for CNN
- Ken Kashiwahara – Emmy-winning television journalist
- Austin H. Kiplinger, journalist and philanthropist
- Charles Lane, columnist for The Washington Post; former editor of The New Republic magazine
- Andy Pollin, radio personality, sports talk station WTEM
- Peter Rosenberg, radio and TV personality, Hot 97
- Andy Serwer, journalist and former managing editor of Fortune magazine
- Tippy Stringer, television personality
- Carol Stuart Watson, illustrator and publisher, co-founder of The Georgetowner

=== Books ===
- Tracy Chevalier — author of Girl with a Pearl Earring
- Joe Haldeman — science-fiction writer, author of The Forever War
- Laura Hillenbrand — author of Seabiscuit: An American Legend and Unbroken
- A.M. Homes — author of The End of Alice
- Michael Lowenthal — author of Avoidance
- Laurie Strongin — author of Saving Henry: A Mother's Journey
- Matthew Zapruder — poet, The Pajamaist

== Notable staff ==
- Colman McCarthy — peace studies teacher
