= Martin's Additions, Maryland =

- Village
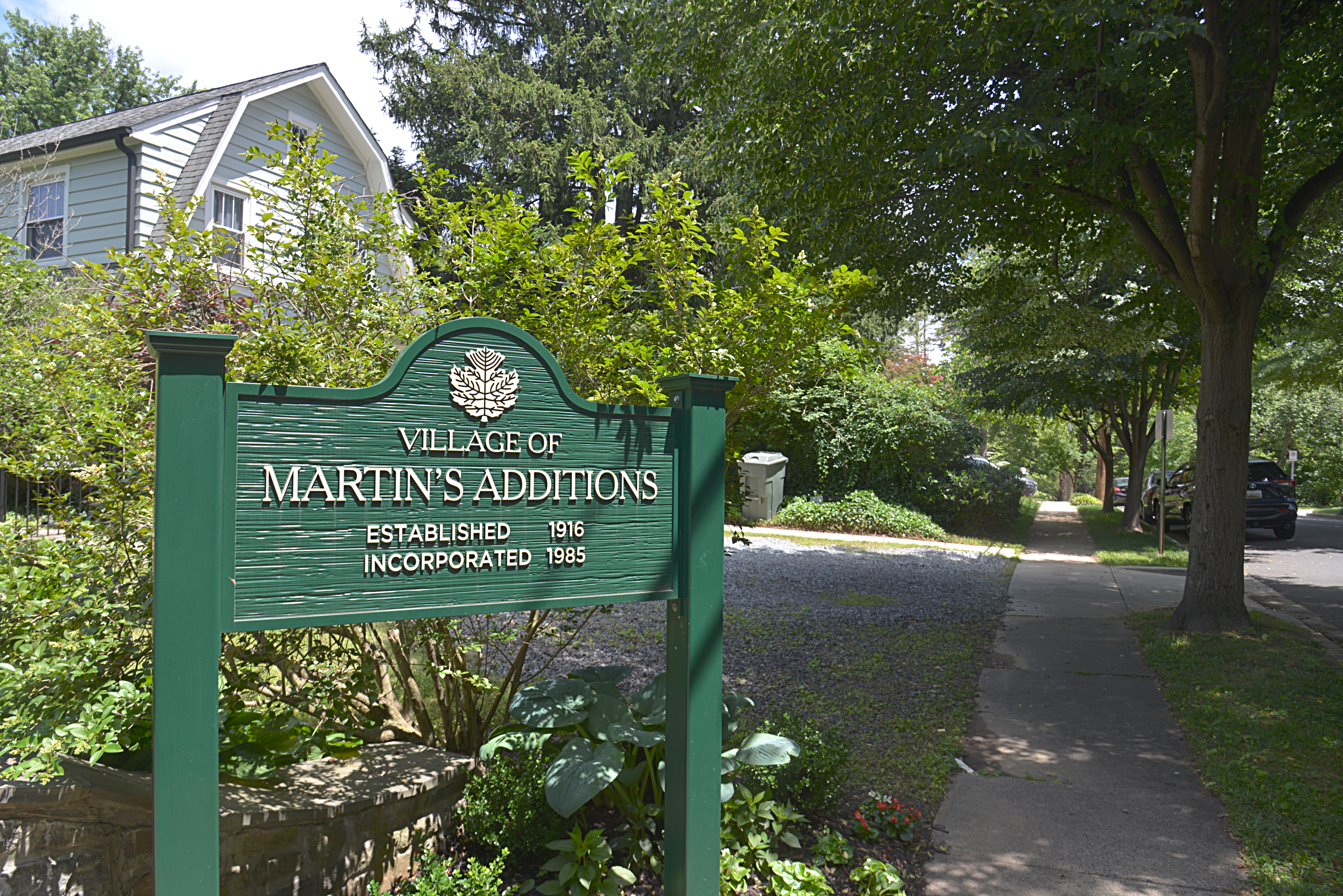
- Entrance sign at the corner of Brookville Road and Quincy Street

- Seal

- Coordinates: 38°58′47″N 77°4′10″W
- Country: United States
- State: Maryland
- County: Montgomery
- Special Tax District: 1916
- Incorporated: March 19, 1985

Government
  - Village Manager: Niles Anderegg

Area
  - Total: 0.14 sq mi (0.36 km^{2})
  - Land: 0.14 sq mi (0.36 km^{2})
  - Water: 0 sq mi (0.00 km^{2})
- Elevation: 338 ft (103 m)

Population (2020)
  - Total: 946
  - Density: 6,843.9/sq mi (2,642.44/km^{2})
- Time zone: UTC-5 (Eastern (EST))
  - Summer (DST): UTC-4 (EDT)
- ZIP code: 20815
- Area codes: 240 and 301
- FIPS code: 24-50965
- GNIS feature ID: 1669431
- Website: martinsadditions.org

Martin's Additions is a village in Montgomery County, Maryland, United States. It was established as a Special Tax District in 1916 and incorporated as a village in 1985. The population was 946 at the 2020 Census.

The town is part of a larger community, colloquially referred to as Chevy Chase, that includes several adjoining settlements in Montgomery County and one neighborhood of Washington, D.C.

== Geography ==
Martin's Additions is located at 38°58′47″N 77°4′10″W (38.979713, −77.069349).

According to the United States Census Bureau, the village has a total area of 0.14 square miles (0.36 km^{2}), all of it land.

== History ==
In 1896, Harry M. Martin began buying land from the Chevy Chase Land Company and others and called his holdings "Martin's Additions to Chevy Chase".

In 1916, the area was incorporated as the special tax district of Martin's First, Second, Third and Fourth Additions to the Village of Chevy Chase.

In February 1985, the residents voted in a referendum on whether to incorporate as a town. The vote was 198 to 15 in favor of incorporation. Following approval of Montgomery County and the U.S. state of Maryland, the special tax district was incorporated as a municipality called the Village of Martin's Additions on March 19, 1985. The first elected village council members were Michael E. Zielinski, Edward C. Holland, Lucy Foa, Karen McManus, and Paul S. Weller.

Before the passage of the Fair Housing Act of 1968, racial covenants were used in Martin's Additions to exclude African-Americans. For example, a 1905 deed for a property owned by Harry M. Martin in H.M. Martin's 3rd Addition says, "That the property hereby conveyed, either before or after improvements are made, cannot be rented, sold, leased or otherwise placed in possession of a colored man or one of the African race."

== Demographics ==
Historical population
Census	Pop.	Note	%±
1990	846		—
2000	875		3.4%
2010	933		6.6%
2020	946		1.4%
U.S. Decennial Census

=== Racial and ethnic composition ===
Martin's Additions village, Maryland – Racial and ethnic composition Note: the US Census treats Hispanic/Latino as an ethnic category. This table excludes Latinos from the racial categories and assigns them to a separate category. Hispanics/Latinos may be of any race.
Race / Ethnicity (NH = Non-Hispanic)	Pop 2000	Pop 2010	Pop 2020	% 2000	% 2010	% 2020
White alone (NH)	821	844	834	93.83%	90.46%	88.16%
Black or African American alone (NH)	1	6	17	0.11%	0.64%	1.80%
Native American or Alaska Native alone (NH)	0	0	1	0.00%	0.00%	0.11%
Asian alone (NH)	11	35	32	1.26%	3.75%	3.38%
Native Hawaiian or Pacific Islander alone (NH)	0	5	0	0.00%	0.54%	0.00%
Other race alone (NH)	1	3	5	0.11%	0.32%	0.53%
Mixed race or Multiracial (NH)	12	10	25	1.37%	1.07%	2.64%
Hispanic or Latino (any race)	29	30	32	3.31%	3.22%	3.38%
Total	875	933	946	100.00%	100.00%	100.00%

=== 2020 census ===
As of the census of 2020, there were 946 people, 342 households and 202 families living in the village. The population density was 6,757.1 inhabitants per square mile (2,608.9/km^{2}). There were 330 housing units at an average density of 2,357.1 per square mile (910.1/km^{2}). The racial makeup of the village was 88.8% White, 1.8% African American, 3.4% Asian, 0.0% Pacific Islander, 0.7% from other races, and 5.2% from two or more races. Hispanic or Latino of any race were 3.4% of the population.

There were 342 households, of which 36.0% had children under the age of 18 living with them, 76.9% were married couples living together, 16.4% had a female householder with no husband present and 6.7% had a male householder with no wife present. 10.5% of all households were made up of individuals, and 6.7% had someone living alone who was 65 years of age or older. The average household size was 3.18 and the average family size was 3.35

The median age in the village was 43.6 years. 24.1% of residents were under the age of 18; 8.0% were between the ages of 18 and 24; 19.0% were from 25 to 44; 26.5% were from 45 to 64; and 22.5% were 65 years of age or older. The gender makeup of the village was 50.4% male and 49.6% female.

=== 2010 census ===
As of the census of 2010, there were 933 people, 321 households, and 269 families living in the village. The population density was 6,664.3 inhabitants per square mile (2,573.1/km^{2}). There were 329 housing units at an average density of 2,350.0 per square mile (907.3/km^{2}). The racial makeup of the village was 92.7% White, 0.6% African American, 3.8% Asian, 0.5% Pacific Islander, 0.9% from other races, and 1.5% from two or more races. Hispanic or Latino of any race were 3.2% of the population.

There were 321 households, of which 44.2% had children under the age of 18 living with them, 76.0% were married couples living together, 5.9% had a female householder with no husband present, 1.9% had a male householder with no wife present, and 16.2% were non-families. 13.4% of all households were made up of individuals, and 6.6% had someone living alone who was 65 years of age or older. The average household size was 2.91 and the average family size was 3.19.

The median age in the village was 44.3 years. 30.4% of residents were under the age of 18; 3.6% were between the ages of 18 and 24; 17.3% were from 25 to 44; 33.1% were from 45 to 64; and 15.8% were 65 years of age or older. The gender makeup of the village was 49.1% male and 50.9% female.

=== 2000 census ===
As of the census of 2000, there were 875 people, 309 households, and 258 families living in the village. The population density was 6,524.6 inhabitants per square mile (2,519.2/km^{2}). There were 312 housing units at an average density of 2,326.5 per square mile (898.3/km^{2}). The racial makeup of the village was 95.66% White, 0.11% African American, 1.26% Asian, 0.91% from other races, and 2.06% from two or more races. Hispanic or Latino of any race were 3.31% of the population.

There were 309 households, out of which 46.0% had children under the age of 18 living with them, 73.5% were married couples living together, 7.4% had a female householder with no husband present, and 16.2% were non-families. 14.6% of all households were made up of individuals, and 8.1% had someone living alone who was 65 years of age or older. The average household size was 2.83 and the average family size was 3.13.

In the village, the population was spread out, with 31.9% under the age of 18, 2.3% from 18 to 24, 20.8% from 25 to 44, 32.0% from 45 to 64, and 13.0% who were 65 years of age or older. The median age was 42 years. For every 100 females, there were 93.2 males. For every 100 females age 18 and over, there were 88.0 males.

The median income for a household in the village was $135,443, and the median income for a family was $144,939. Males had a median income of $100,000 versus $91,112 for females. The per capita income for the village was $59,502. About 1.5% of families and 1.2% of the population were below the poverty line, including 2.1% of those under age 18 and none of those age 65 or over.

== Transportation ==
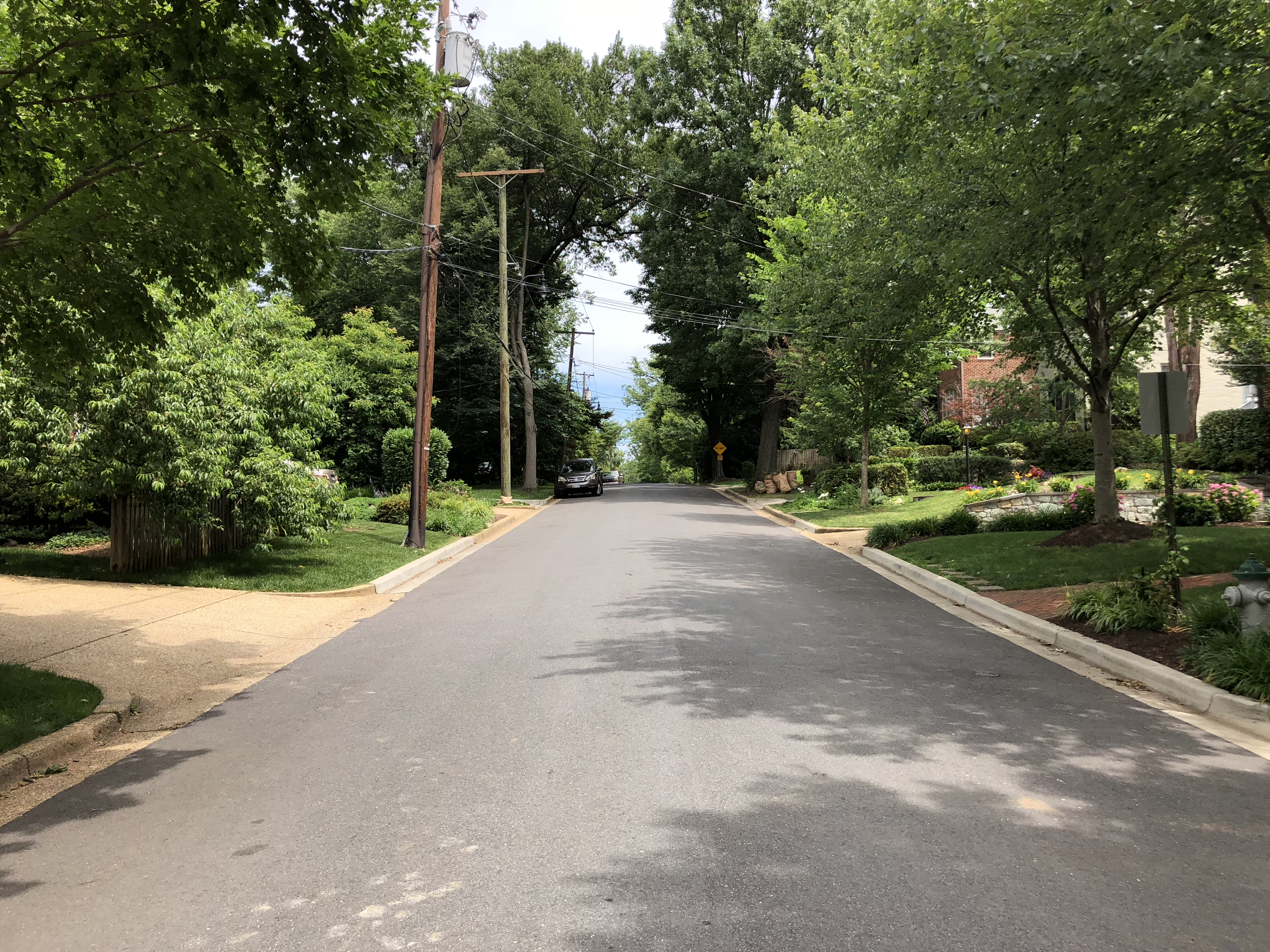
Summit Avenue, a typical street in Martin's Additions

No state highways serve Martin's Additions directly, with all streets being both residential and locally maintained. The closest state highway is Maryland Route 186 (Brookville Road) which passes just west of the village border.

== Education ==
Martin's Additions is served by the Montgomery County Public Schools.

The village is zoned to:

- Rosemary Hills Elementary School (PreK-2)
- Chevy Chase Elementary School (3-5)
- Silver Creek Middle School (6-8)
- Bethesda-Chevy Chase High School (9-12)
