= Chevy Chase (town), Maryland =

Town in Montgomery County, Maryland, US

Town of Chevy Chase, Maryland
- Town
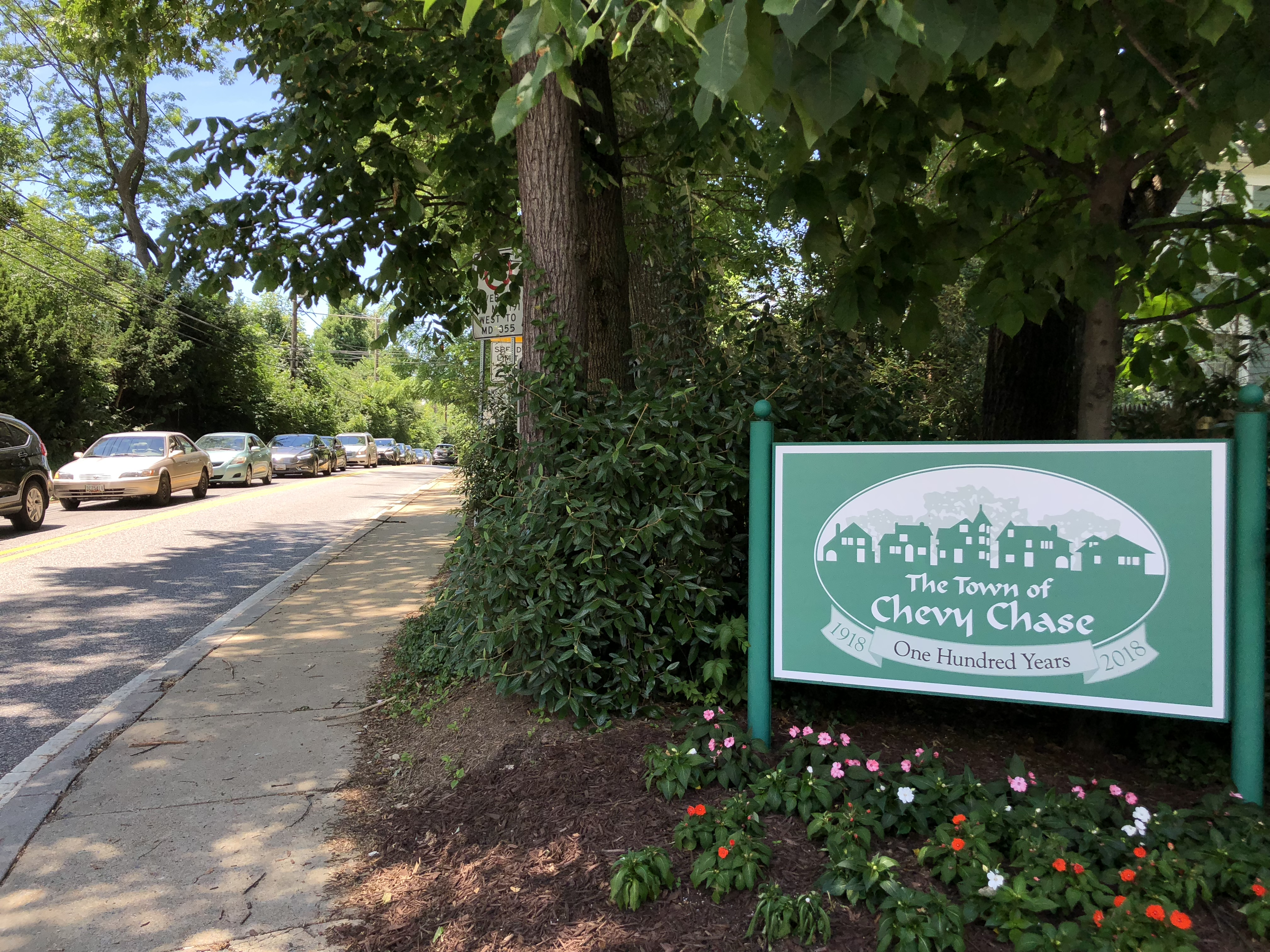
- Entering the Town of Chevy Chase along MD 191 westbound

- Flag Seal

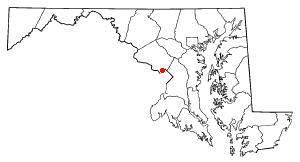
- Location of Chevy Chase
- Coordinates: 38°58′55″N 77°05′00″W
- Country: United States
- State: Maryland
- County: Montgomery
- Incorporated: 1918
- Named for: Chevy Chase Land Company

Area
  - Total: 0.46 sq mi (1.20 km^{2})
  - Land: 0.46 sq mi (1.20 km^{2})
  - Water: 0 sq mi (0.00 km^{2})
- Elevation: 338 ft (103 m)

Population (2020)
  - Total: 2,904
  - Density: 6,247.0/sq mi (2,411.97/km^{2})
- Time zone: UTC-5 (Eastern (EST))
  - Summer (DST): UTC-4 (EDT)
- ZIP Codes: 20813, 20815, 20825
- Area codes: 301; 240
- FIPS code: 24-16620
- GNIS feature ID: 2390788
- Website: www.townofchevychase.org

Chevy Chase (/ˈtʃɛviː tʃeɪs/)—formally, the Town of Chevy Chase—is an incorporated town in Montgomery County, Maryland, United States. The population was 2,904 at the 2020 census.

The town is part of a larger community, colloquially referred to as Chevy Chase, that includes several adjoining settlements in Montgomery County and one neighborhood of Washington.

== History ==
In the 1890s, a real estate syndicate led by Francis G. Newlands bought more than 1,700 acres in upper Northwest D.C. and southern Montgomery County to create a Maryland streetcar suburb he dubbed Chevy Chase. In 1918, the subdivision called Section IV was incorporated as a municipality called the Town of Chevy Chase, creating a town government empowered to collect taxes and provide services.

== Government ==
The Town of Chevy Chase has a council form of government, consisting of five councilmembers, who are elected to staggered two-year terms. Each year, at its organizational meeting, the town council elects among its members the mayor, who presides at council meetings and serves as the head of town government. The current Mayor is Barney Rush, who was elected in 2024.

== Geography ==
The Town of Chevy Chase is located in southern Montgomery County. Its southern border is 1 mile (1.6 km) north of the District of Columbia. The town is bordered by the villages of Chevy Chase Section Five and Chevy Chase Section Three to the east, by unincorporated portions of Chevy Chase to the north, and by Bethesda to the west. The town is bordered to the south by the Chevy Chase Club.

According to the United States Census Bureau, the Town of Chevy Chase has a total area of 0.47 square miles (1.22 km^{2}), all land.

Coquelin Run, a tributary of Rock Creek, rises in the town.

== Demographics ==
Historical population
Census	Pop.	Note	%±
1950	1,971		—
1960	2,243		13.8%
1970	2,266		1.0%
1980	2,903		28.1%
1990	2,675		−7.9%
2000	2,726		1.9%
2010	2,824		3.6%
2020	2,904		2.8%
U.S. Decennial Census

=== Racial and ethnic composition ===
Chevy Chase town, Maryland – Racial and ethnic composition Note: the US Census treats Hispanic/Latino as an ethnic category. This table excludes Latinos from the racial categories and assigns them to a separate category. Hispanics/Latinos may be of any race.
Race / Ethnicity (NH = Non-Hispanic)	Pop 2000	Pop 2010	Pop 2020	% 2000	% 2010	% 2020
White alone (NH)	2,520	2,488	2,360	92.44%	88.10%	81.27%
Black or African American alone (NH)	24	27	25	0.88%	0.96%	0.86%
Native American or Alaska Native alone (NH)	0	2	4	0.00%	0.07%	0.14%
Asian alone (NH)	59	108	160	2.16%	3.82%	5.51%
Native Hawaiian or Pacific Islander alone (NH)	1	0	0	0.04%	0.00%	0.00%
Other race alone (NH)	4	6	19	0.15%	0.21%	0.65%
Mixed race or Multiracial (NH)	26	59	186	0.95%	2.09%	6.40%
Hispanic or Latino (any race)	92	134	150	3.37%	4.75%	5.17%
Total	2,726	2,824	2,904	100.00%	100.00%	100.00%

=== 2010 census ===
As of the census of 2010, there were 2,824 people, 1,003 households, and 835 families living in the town. The population density was 6,008.5 inhabitants per square mile (2,319.9/km^{2}). There were 1,042 housing units at an average density of 2,217.0 per square mile (856.0/km^{2}). The racial makeup of the town was 92.1% White, 1.0% African American, 0.1% Native American, 3.9% Asian, 0.7% from other races, and 2.2% from two or more races. Hispanic or Latino of any race were 4.7% of the population.

There were 1,003 households, of which 41.5% had children under the age of 18 living with them, 75.0% were married couples living together, 6.2% had a female householder with no husband present, 2.1% had a male householder with no wife present, and 16.7% were non-families. 13.6% of all households were made up of individuals, and 7.6% had someone living alone who was 65 years of age or older. The average household size was 2.82 and the average family size was 3.06.

The median age in the town was 46.3 years. 27.5% of residents were under the age of 18; 4.7% were between the ages of 18 and 24; 15.8% were from 25 to 44; 37.5% were from 45 to 64; and 14.4% were 65 years of age or older. The gender makeup of the town was 48.1% male and 51.9% female.

=== 2000 census ===
As of the census of 2000, there were 2,726 people, 987 households, and 802 families living in the town. The population density was 5,822.9 inhabitants per square mile (2,248.2/km^{2}). There were 1,024 housing units at an average density of 2,187.3 per square mile (844.5/km^{2}). The racial makeup of the town was 95.01% White, 0.88% Black or African American, 0.04% Native American, 2.20% Asian, 0.04% Pacific Islander, 0.51% from other races, and 1.32% from two or more races. Hispanic or Latino of any race were 3.37% of the population.

There were 987 households, out of which 42.1% had children under the age of 18 living with them, 73.6% were married couples living together, 6.1% had a female householder with no husband present, and 18.7% were non-families. 14.9% of all households were made up of individuals, and 7.3% had someone living alone who was 65 years of age or older. The average household size was 2.76 and the average family size was 3.04.

In the town, the population was spread out, with 28.5% under the age of 18, 2.7% from 18 to 24, 22.3% from 25 to 44, 32.5% from 45 to 64, and 13.9% who were 65 years of age or older. The median age was 43 years. For every 100 females, there were 86.3 males. For every 100 females age 18 and over, there were 87.1 males.

The median income for a household in the town was $160,331, and the median income for a family was $167,790. Males had a median income of $100,000 versus $66,705 for females. The per capita income for the town was $70,325. About 0.9% of families and 2.1% of the population were below the poverty line, including 1.8% of those under age 18 and 3.9% of those age 65 or over.

== Transportation ==
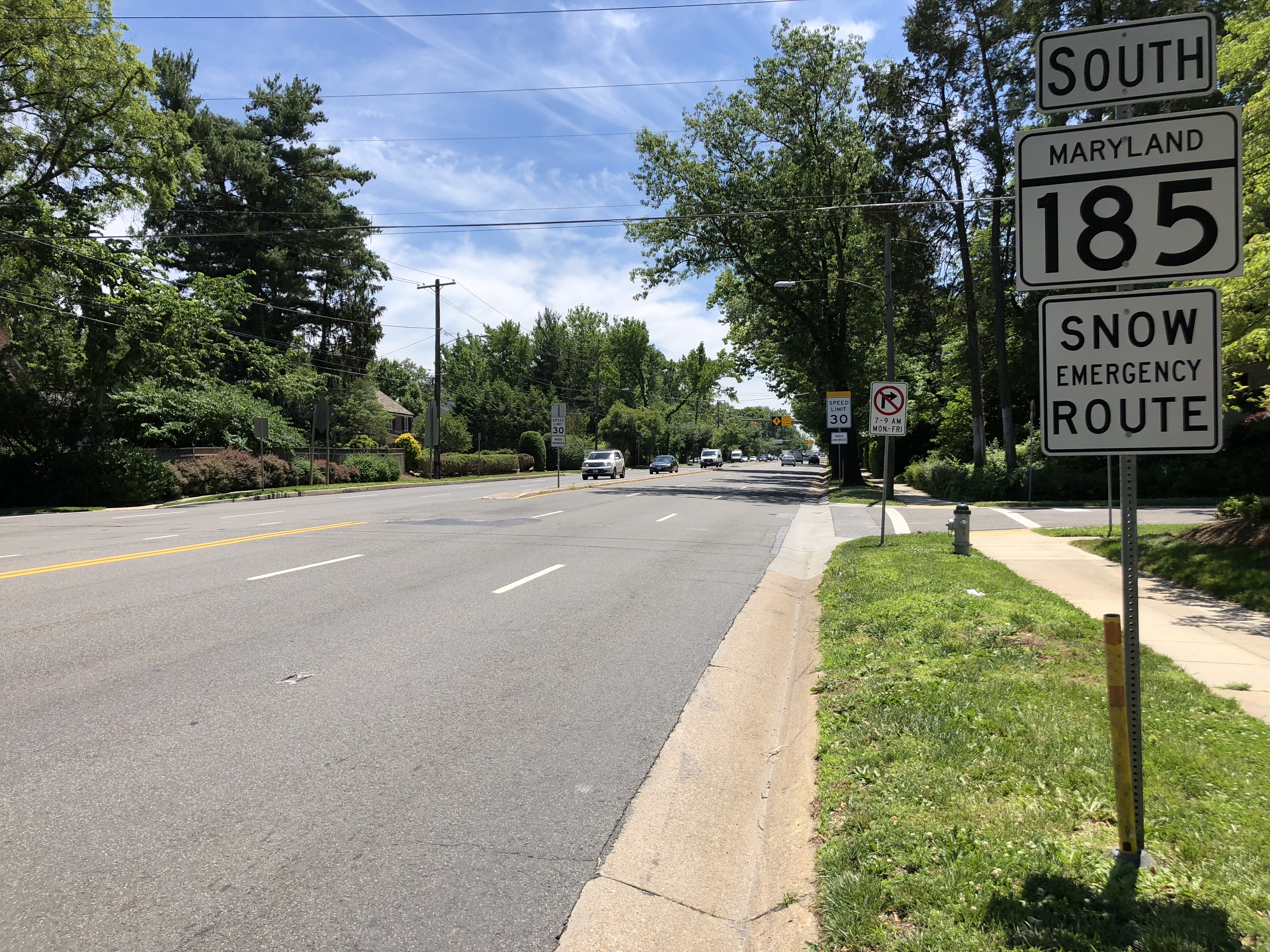
MD 185 southbound on the east edge of Chevy Chase

Three state highways conscribe the town to the north, east, and south, while a fourth lies just to the west. The most prominent is Maryland Route 185 (Connecticut Avenue), which forms the town's eastern border. MD 185 extends south to Washington, D.C., and north to the nearest Interstate highway, Interstate 495 (the Capital Beltway). Maryland Route 410 (East–West Highway) runs along the town's northern border, then eastward toward other suburban towns north and northeast of Washington. Maryland Route 191, which forms the south edge of town, extends west through Bethesda to Potomac. The fourth highway, lying just beyond the town's western edge, is Maryland Route 355 (Wisconsin Avenue), which provides many of the same connections as MD 185.

The town's transit options include the Washington Metro's Red Line, whose Bethesda station sits about a quarter-mile from the town's northwest corner; and several Ride On and Metrobus bus lines that stop on Connecticut or Wisconsin Avenues.

From 1890 to 1935, the area was served by a streetcar line running along Connecticut Avenue. Founded as the Rock Creek Railway, it was later operated by the Capital Traction Company and Capital Transit Company until it was replaced by buses in 1935.

== Education ==
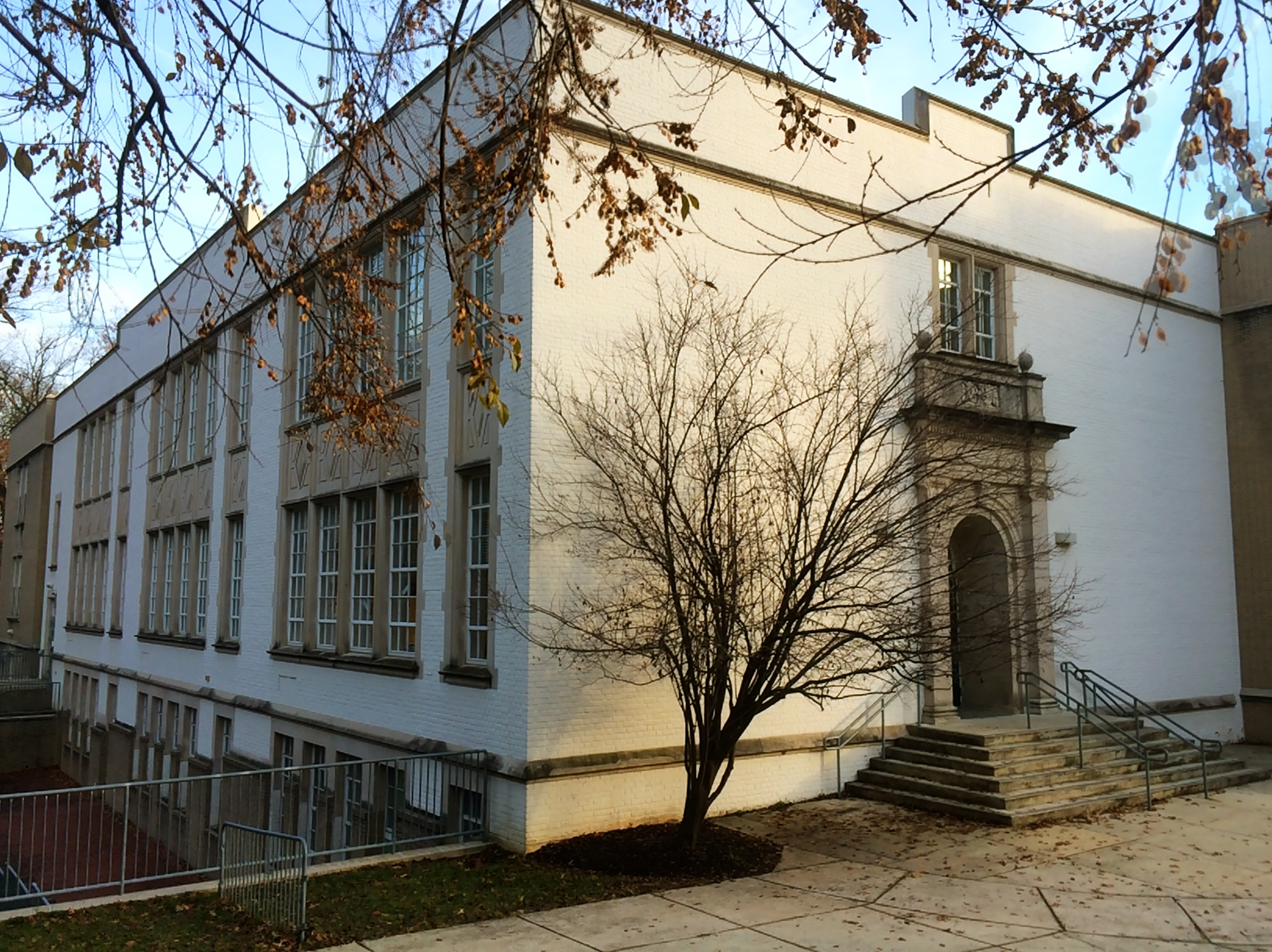
Chevy Chase Elementary School (west wing), Rosemary Street, town of Chevy Chase

The Town of Chevy Chase sends students to the Montgomery County Public Schools.

Residents are zoned to Rosemary Hills Elementary School (PreK-2) (unincorporated Montgomery County), North Chevy Chase Elementary School, Westbrook Elementary School, Chevy Chase Elementary School (3-6) (in the Town of Chevy Chase), Westland Middle School (unincorporated Montgomery County) and Bethesda-Chevy Chase High School (unincorporated Montgomery County).

== See also ==
- Chevy Chase Elementary School
- Chevy Chase Junior College
