= Chevy Chase Section Five, Maryland =

- Village
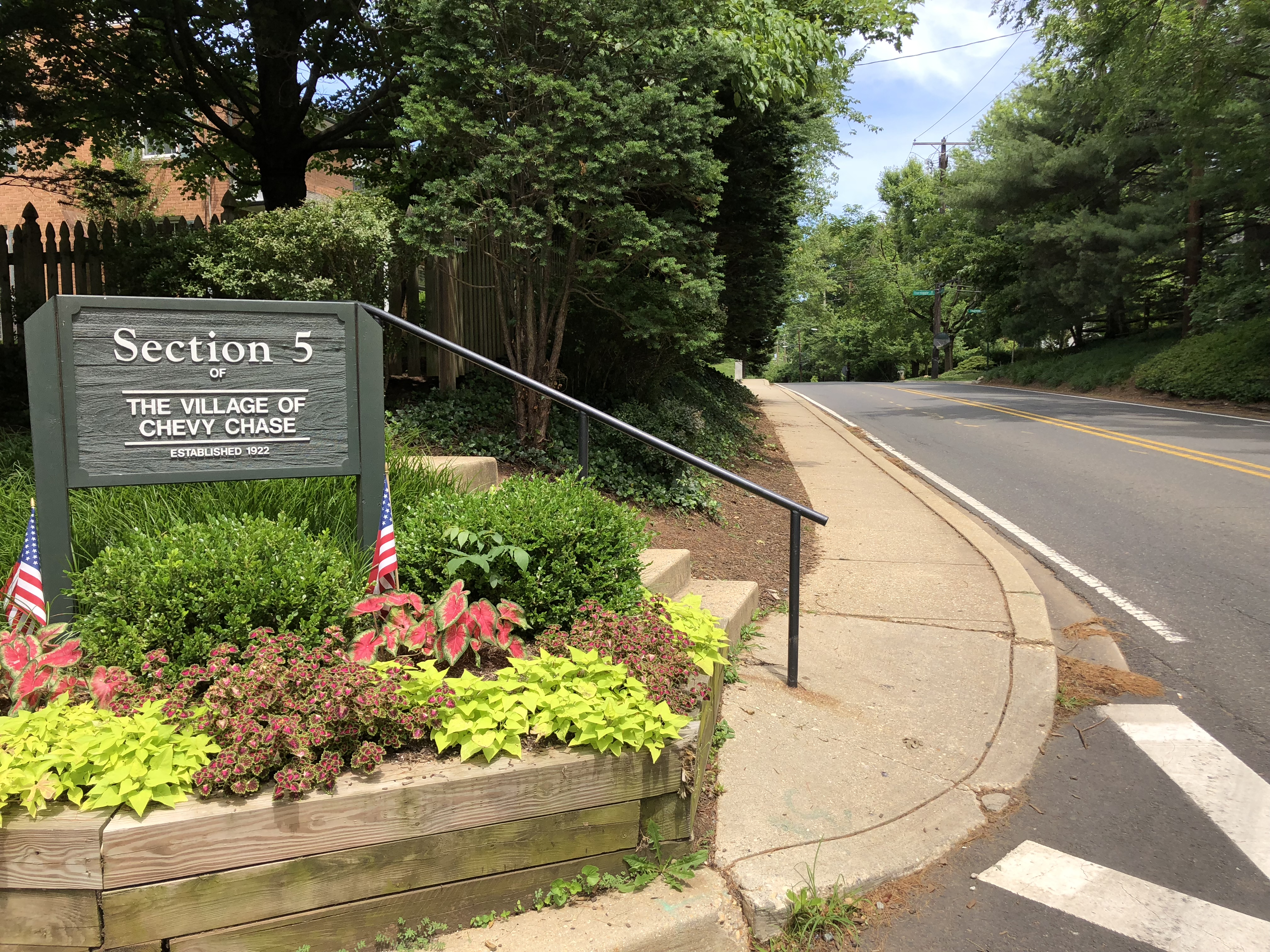
- Entering Chevy Chase Section Five along MD Route 186 northbound

- Logo

- Coordinates: 38°58′59″N 77°4′29″W
- Country: United States
- State: Maryland
- County: Montgomery
- Special Tax District: 1922
- Incorporated: June 25, 1982

Government
  - Town manager: Ashley Estes Kavanaugh (R)

Area
  - Total: 0.11 sq mi (0.28 km^{2})
  - Land: 0.11 sq mi (0.28 km^{2})
  - Water: 0 sq mi (0.00 km^{2})
- Elevation: 305 ft (93 m)

Population (2020)
  - Total: 672
  - Density: 6,293.9/sq mi (2,430.09/km^{2})
- Time zone: UTC-5 (Eastern (EST))
  - Summer (DST): UTC-4 (EDT)
- ZIP code: 20815
- Area codes: 240 and 301
- FIPS code: 24-16720
- GNIS feature ID: 1669432
- Website: www.chevychasesection5.org

Chevy Chase Section Five is an incorporated village in Montgomery County, Maryland, United States. The population was 672 at the 2020 census.

It is part of a larger community, colloquially referred to as Chevy Chase, that includes several adjoining settlements in Montgomery County and one neighborhood of Washington, D.C.

== History ==
In 1922, the Maryland state legislature established the area as a special taxing district called Section Five of the Village of Chevy Chase. State law prohibited "riotous conduct, profanity, [and] vulgar language" within its bounds.

On May 18, 1982, a referendum was held on whether to incorporate as a village. The vote was in favor of incorporation.

== Geography ==
Chevy Chase Section Five is located at 38°58′59″N 77°4′29″W (38.983060, -77.074786).

According to the United States Census Bureau, the village has a total area of 0.10 square miles (0.26 km^{2}), all land.

Home prices in Chevy Chase Section Five range from just under $1,000,000 to well over $2,000,000.

== Demographics ==
Historical population
Census	Pop.	Note	%±
1990	632		—
2000	641		1.4%
2010	658		2.7%
2020	672		2.1%
U.S. Decennial Census

=== Racial and ethnic composition ===
Chevy Chase Section Five village, Maryland – Racial and ethnic composition Note: the US Census treats Hispanic/Latino as an ethnic category. This table excludes Latinos from the racial categories and assigns them to a separate category. Hispanics/Latinos may be of any race.
Race / Ethnicity (NH = Non-Hispanic)	Pop 2000	Pop 2010	Pop 2020	% 2000	% 2010	% 2020
White alone (NH)	596	610	586	92.98%	92.71%	87.20%
Black or African American alone (NH)	1	0	7	0.16%	0.00%	1.04%
Native American or Alaska Native alone (NH)	0	0	1	0.00%	0.00%	0.15%
Asian alone (NH)	8	14	18	1.25%	2.13%	2.68%
Native Hawaiian or Pacific Islander alone (NH)	0	0	0	0.00%	0.00%	0.00%
Other race alone (NH)	7	0	5	1.09%	0.00%	0.74%
Mixed race or Multiracial (NH)	4	12	33	0.62%	1.82%	4.91%
Hispanic or Latino (any race)	25	22	22	3.90%	3.34%	3.27%
Total	641	658	672	100.00%	100.00%	100.00%

=== 2010 census ===
As of the census of 2010, there were 658 people, 222 households, and 191 families living in the village. The population density was 6,580.0 inhabitants per square mile (2,540.6/km^{2}). There were 226 housing units at an average density of 2,260.0 per square mile (872.6/km^{2}). The racial makeup of the village was 95.6% White, 3.3% Hispanic or Latino of any race, 2.1% Asian, 1.8% from two or more races, 0.2% African American and 0.3% from other races.

There were 222 households, of which 45.9% had children under the age of 18 living with them, 78.4% were married couples living together, 4.1% had a female householder with no husband present, 3.6% had a male householder with no wife present, and 14.0% were non-families. 13.1% of all households were made up of individuals, and 8.6% had someone living alone who was 65 years of age or older. The average household size was 2.96 and the average family size was 3.24.

The median age in the village was 44 years. 31.2% of residents were under the age of 18; 4.3% were between the ages of 18 and 24; 17% were from 25 to 44; 34.6% were from 45 to 64; and 12.9% were 65 years of age or older. The gender makeup of the village was 46.7% male and 53.3% female.

=== 2000 census ===
As of the census of 2000, there were 641 people, 224 households, and 189 families living in the village. The population density was 6,114.6 inhabitants per square mile (2,360.9/km^{2}). There were 228 housing units at an average density of 2,174.9 per square mile (839.7/km^{2}). The racial makeup of the village was 95.94% White, 0.16% African American, 1.25% Asian, 2.03% from other races, and 0.62% from two or more races. Hispanic or Latino of any race were 3.90% of the population.

There were 224 households, out of which 48.7% had children under the age of 18 living with them, 76.8% were married couples living together, 5.4% had a female householder with no husband present, and 15.6% were non-families. 13.4% of all households were made up of individuals, and 9.4% had someone living alone who was 65 years of age or older. The average household size was 2.86 and the average family size was 3.12.

In the village, the population was spread out, with 30.1% under the age of 18, 3.3% from 18 to 24, 21.8% from 25 to 44, 30.3% from 45 to 64, and 14.5% who were 65 years of age or older. The median age was 42 years. For every 100 females, there were 94.2 males. For every 100 females age 18 and over, there were 89.8 males.

The median income for a household in the village was $153,626, and the median income for a family was $168,664. Males had a median income of $100,000 versus $80,000 for females. The per capita income for the village was $70,372. None of the families and 0.5% of the population were living below the poverty line, including no under eighteens and none of those over 64.

== Transportation ==
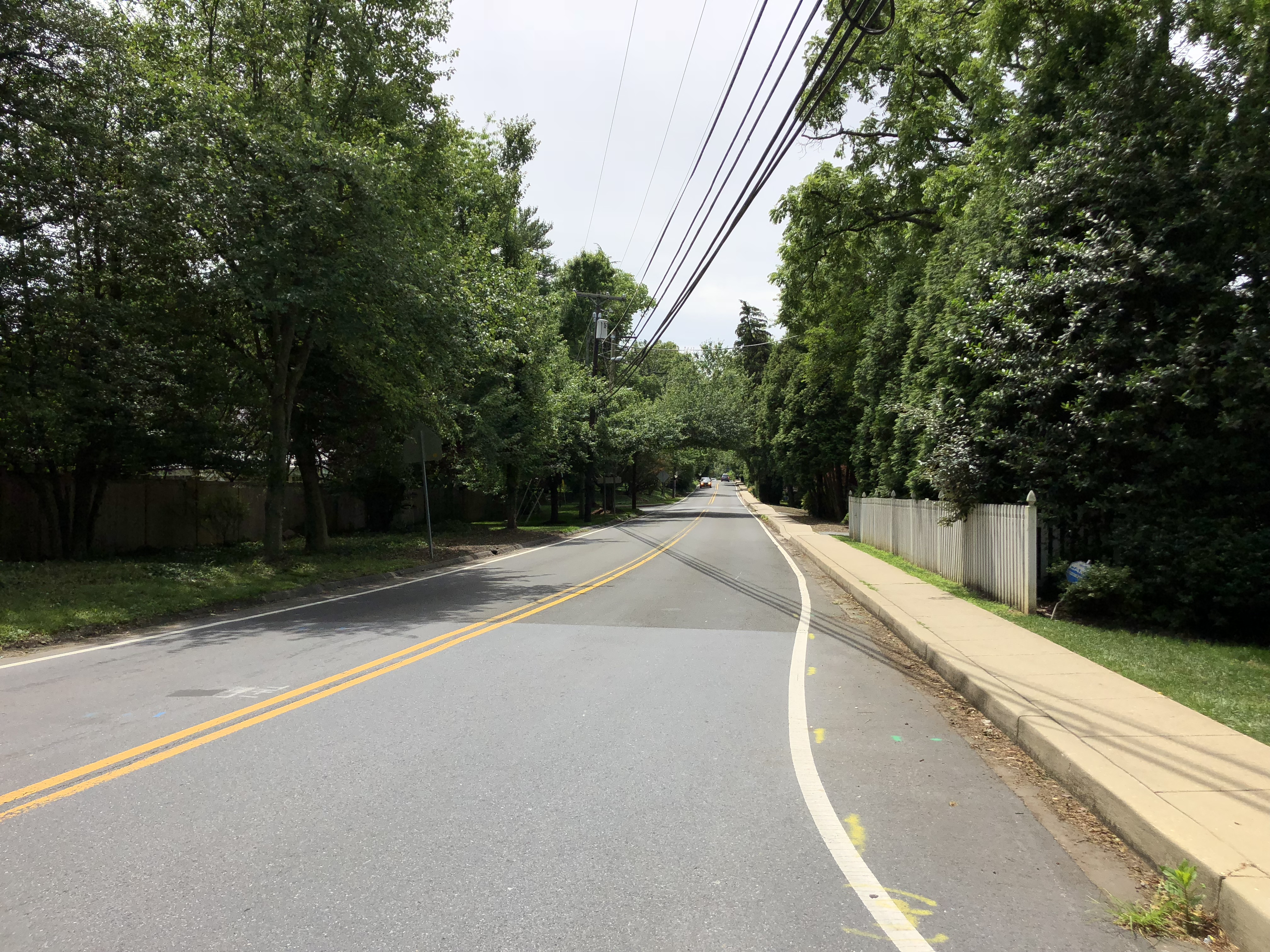
MD 186 southbound in Chevy Chase Section Five.

The only state highway serving Chevy Chase Section Five is Maryland Route 186 (Brookville Road). Maryland Route 185 (Connecticut Avenue) passes just west of the village.

== Education ==
Residents are served by schools in the Montgomery County Public Schools.

Residents are zoned to Rosemary Hills Elementary School (PreK-2), Chevy Chase Elementary School (3-6), Silver Creek Middle School, and Bethesda-Chevy Chase High School.
