= Chevy Chase Elementary School =

Elementary school in Chevy Chase, Maryland, US

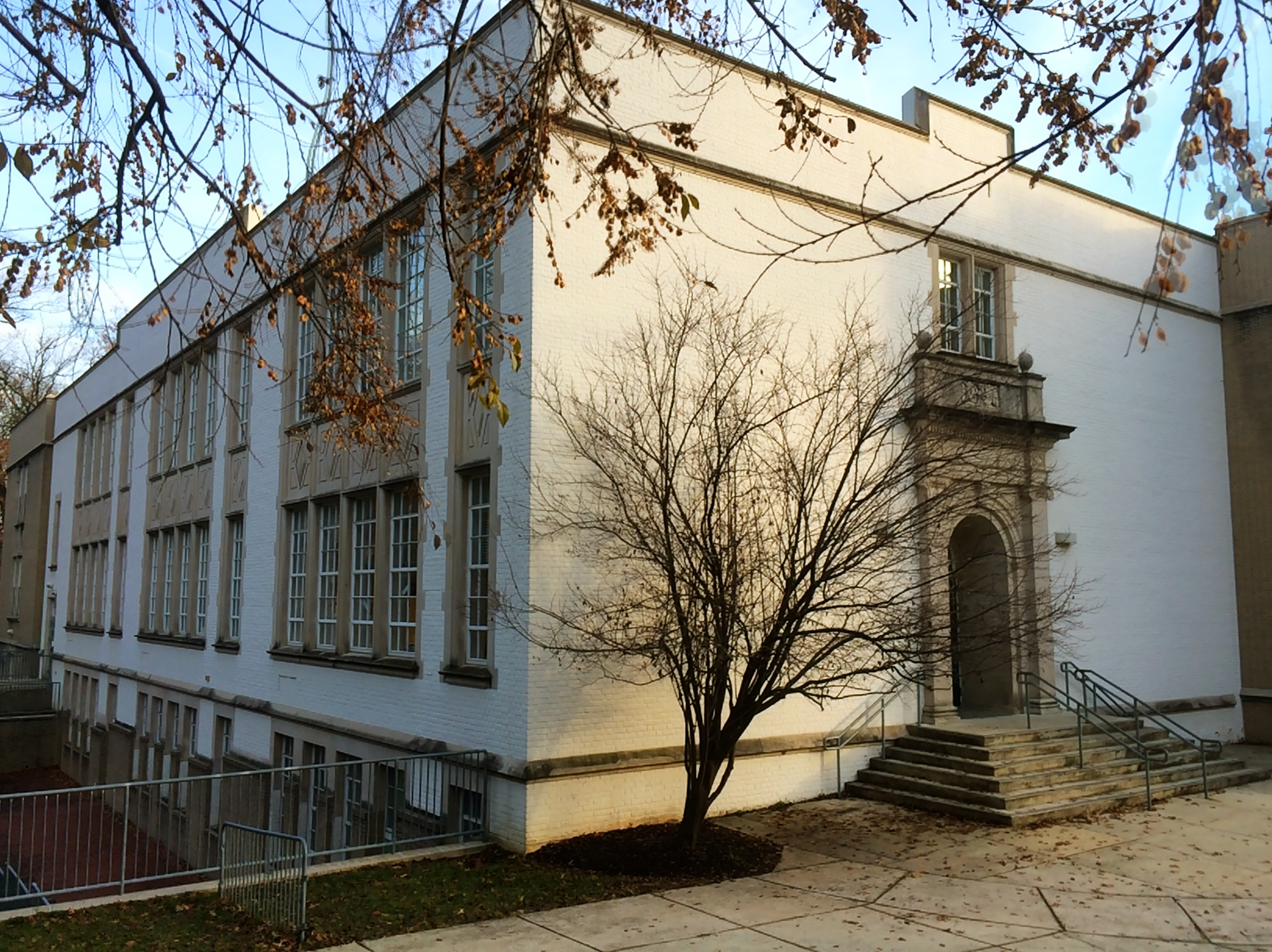
- West wing (1936)

Location
- 4015 Rosemary Street, Chevy Chase, Maryland 20815; 38°58′42.7″N 77°04′49″W

Information
- School type: Elementary School
- Founded: 1917
- Principal: Jodi Smith
- Grades: 3–5
- Education system: Montgomery County Public Schools
- Mascot: Cheetah
- Website: montgomeryschoolsmd.org/schools/chevychasees/

Chevy Chase Elementary School is an elementary school containing grades 3–5 in Chevy Chase, Maryland. Founded in 1917, the school today occupies a much-renovated and -expanded 1930 building that has been designated as an Historic Site by the Maryland Historical Trust. The school is also said to have had the first school library in the county, established in 1939.

The building has been described as "an early example of school architecture that successfully combines both traditional and modern design elements", with "Art Deco geometric panels and stepped-up parapets [that] were modern for the era, yet ... tempered by classical door and window treatments".

== History ==
The early 1900s brought educated government workers to developing areas of Montgomery County such as Silver Spring, Bethesda, and Chevy Chase. A two-room schoolhouse on Bradley Lane in Chevy Chase served residents from 1898 until 1917, when a permanent school building was constructed. In that year, a two-story brick building was built on Rosemary Street by a contractor named Roy W. Poole of Frederick, Maryland, at a cost of $20,000 in county funds. It served students in grades 1-10. It was for many years was known informally as the "Rosemary School" after its location on Rosemary Street.

In 1930, a 12-classroom brick building designed by Howard Wright Cutler was added to the Chevy Chase School for $94,000.

In 1936, nine classrooms were added for $103,000 to the west wing. With this addition, the original 1917 structure was demolished. To connect the new buildings, a “Long Hall” was added. This “Long Hall” connected the two buildings to each other, but only from the first floor. This hall did not contain any insulation and was known to be unstable.

The school is also said to have had the first school library in the county, established in 1939.

By the early 1970s, the school buildings were aging and out of date, necessitating extensive renovation and expansion. The process took two summers and a school year (during which time students were ferried to other nearby schools) and was completed in time for the 1975–76 school year. The renovated and expanded building provided more classrooms, a bigger library, and a courtyard in the middle.

The year 1976 also brought the inception of a plan to bus younger students to Rosemary Hills Elementary School, whose minority enrollment had in the late 1960s "increased from 10 percent to 53 percent in six years, while the countywide average was only 5 percent". Chevy Chase ES became a school for 3rd to 6th grades.

In 1981, the school district again revamped elementary schools in the Bethesda-Chevy Chase cluster, returning CCES to a K-6 school.

Chevy Chase Elementary was awarded a National Blue Ribbon for excellence during the 1993–1994 school year.

At some point, the school was again split, with students in the Chevy Chase ES catchment area K-2 students attending Rosemary Hills for grades K-2 before returning for grades 3-6, then going on to Westland Middle School for the 7th and 8th grade. In 2011, population growth in the area led superintendent Joshua Starr to propose a second middle school in the Bethesda-Chevy Chase cluster, and to move 6th graders from CCES and North Chevy Chase to the middle school level. On November 21, 2016, the Montgomery County Board of Education approved boundaries that would send CCES students, including rising 6th-graders, to the new Silver Creek Middle School.

In 2017, the school celebrated its 100th anniversary.

== Center for Enriched Studies ==
Chevy Chase Elementary School is home to one of nine Centers for Enriched Studies programs in Montgomery County Public Schools. It serves 4th and 5th graders on an accelerated track, and the program at CCES is open to anyone in the attendance zone for Bethesda-Chevy Chase, Walter Johnson, or Walt Whitman high schools.

== See also ==
- Town of Chevy Chase
