= Don River Bridge =

Don River Bridge may refer to:

- Don River Bridge, Bowen, Queensland, Australia; across the Don River
- Don River Bridge, Rannes, Queensland, Australia; across the Don River
- Don River Bridge, Toronto, Ontario, Canada; a rail bridge over the Don River; see List of bridges in Toronto

== See also ==
- Don Bridge (disambiguation)
- Bridge of Don (disambiguation)
- Don River (disambiguation)
- Don (disambiguation)
