= Done =

Done may refer to:

== Places ==
- Done, Maharashtra, a village in India

== People with the name ==
- Done P. Dabale (1949–2006), Nigerian philanthropist, theologian, farmer, nurse, educator and author
- Cheryl Done (born 1970), British bobsledder
- Cyril Done (1920–1993), English footballer
- Frances Done (born 1950), British public administrator, accountant and politician
- Fred Done (born 1943), English businessman
- Jason Done (born 1973), English actor
- John Done (c. 1747–1831), Justice of the Maryland Court of Appeals
- Ken Done (born 1940), Australian artist
- Matt Done (born 1988), English footballer
- Peter Done (born 1947), English businessman
- Richard Done (born 1955), Australian cricketer
- Robert Done (1904–1982), English footballer
- William Done (1815–1895), English organist

== Music ==
- Done (18th Dye album), 1994
- Done (Straitjacket Fits album), 1992
- "Done" (The Band Perry song), 2013
- "Done" (Chris Janson song), 2019
- "Done", a 2011 song by The Haunted from the album Unseen

== Other uses ==
- DONE (Data-based Online Nonlinear Extremumseeker), an optimization algorithm
- Methadone, "done" in slang

== See also ==
- Doan (disambiguation)
- Don (disambiguation)
- Donne (disambiguation)
- Den (disambiguation)
- Dunn (disambiguation)
- Dunne (disambiguation)
- Doneness, a measure of the degree to which meat is cooked
- Doer (disambiguation)
- Do (disambiguation)
