= Bridge of Don (disambiguation) =

Bridge of Don may refer to:

- Bridge of Don, Aberdeen, Scotland, UK; a suburb of Aberdeen
- Bridge of Don (ward), Aberdeen, Scotland, UK; a ward of Aberdeen
- Bridge of Don (bridge), Aberdeen, Scotland, UK; a bridge over the River Don
- Bridge of Don Academy, Bridge of Don, Aberdeen, Scotland, UK; a secondary school

== See also ==
- Bridge of Dun, Angus, Scotland
- Don Bridge (disambiguation)
- Don River Bridge (disambiguation)
- Don River (disambiguation)
- Don (disambiguation)
