= The Don =

The Don may refer to:

== People and characters ==
- The Don, a crime boss, especially in the Mafia
- Don Bradman, Australian cricketer
- Don Johnson, American actor
- Donald Trump, 45th and 47th president of the United States
- Don Dunstan, Australian politician
- Don Matthews, Canadian Football League head coach
- Eamon Dunne, Irish criminal

== Places ==
- Don River (disambiguation)
- Don, Tasmania, Australia

== Music ==
- Don Caballero, a rock group from Pittsburgh, Pennsylvania
- "The Don" (The View song)
- "The Don" (Nas song)

== Other uses ==
- The Don (1995 film), an Indian film
- The Don (2006 film), an Indian film

== See also ==
- Don (disambiguation)
- The Donald (disambiguation)
