= Doan =

Doan is a surname commonly found in North America, Europe, and Vietnam.

Doan may refer to:

== People ==
=== American and European surname ===
In North America and Europe, the surname "Doan" is a variation of Done, Donn, Donne, Doane, and Doune, among others. Notable people from North America and Europe with the surname "Doan" include:

- The Doan Outlaws, an outlaw gang active in Bucks County, Pennsylvania, during the American Revolution
- Catriona Le May Doan (born 1970), Canadian speed skater
- Christine Doan (born 1949), former Michigan-born Australian equestrian, sustainability advocate and technology entrepreneur
- Daniel Doan (1914–1993), American writer
- Dianne Doan (born 1980), Canadian actress
- Ebenezer Doan (1772–1866), Canadian architect
- Fletcher Morris Doan (1846–1924), American jurist
- Helen Doan (1911–2024), Canadian supercentenarian
- Jack Doan (born 1972), American wrestling referee
- Jenny Doan, founder of the Missouri Star Quilting Company in Hamilton, Missouri
- John Doan (born 1951), American guitarist and compose
- Josh Doan (born 2002), American ice hockey player
- Joshua Gwillen Doan (1811–1839), Canadian farmer and tanner
- Lurita Doan (born 1958), American politician and businesswoman
- Martha Doan (1872–1960), American chemist
- Paulette Doan, Canadian ice dancer
- Robert E. Doan (1831–1919), American lawyer and politician in Ohio
- Shane Doan (born 1976), Canadian professional ice hockey player
- Steven Doan (born 1986), American attorney and politician in Kentucky
- Trish Doan (1985–2017), Korean-Canadian musician
- Walt Doan (1887–1935), American baseball player
- William Doan (1792–1847), American politician

=== Vietnamese surname ===
In Vietnam, the surname "Doan" was historically associated with an elegant and powerful tribe/family/group. In Ancient Vietnam, Doan was reserved for prestigious members of society who were responsible for protecting the nation, such as royal guards and military generals. Today, the word "Doan" is added before the names of groups and organizations to imply great power and influence. Notable people from Vietnam with the surname "Doan" include:

- Đoàn Văn Khâm, a poet, honorary title, Ministry of Public Works, under Emperor Lý Nhân Tông (1072–1128)
- Đoàn Thượng (1184–1228), a general under the Ly dynasty
- Đoàn Nhữ Hài (1280–1335), a general, honorary title under three generations of the Tran dynasty
- Đoàn Xuân Lôi, a valedictorian in National Examination (1384) hosted by King father Trần Nghệ Tông
- Đoàn Công Uẩn, a great general under the Le dynasty
- Đoàn Nhân Công, a second valedictorian in National Examination (1448) hosted by King Lê Nhân Tông
- Đoàn Thị Điểm (1705–1748), the classical-Annamese female poet under the Le dynasty,
- Đoàn Tử Quang (1818–1928), compelled by his mom to take and pass the National Examination at age 80 (1900) under the Nguyen dynasty
- Đoàn Nhật Tân (alias Hà Đức Minh), National Assemblyman and Central Executive Committee member of the Cần Lao Party under the Republic of Vietnam (1955–1963)
- Đoàn Đình Niêu, Vietnamese poet
- Đoàn Như Khuê, Vietnamese poet
- Đoàn Giỏi, Vietnamese writer
- Võ Phiến official name Đoàn Thế Nhơn, Vietnamese writer
- Đoàn Nguyên Đức, businessman, chairman of Hoang Anh Gia Lai Group

=== Given name ===
- Doan Bui, French journalist
- Doan Hoang (born 1972), Vietnamese-American documentary film director and producer
- Doan Ogden (1908–1989), American landscape architect

== Other uses ==
- Doan, Alberta, a locality in Red Deer County, Alberta, Canada
- Doan, Down, a 593-metre (1,946 ft) peak in the Mourne Mountains in County Down, Northern Ireland
- Doan Brook, a river in Northeastern Ohio, U.S.
- Doan House, a historic residence in the city of Wilmington, Ohio, U.S.
- Doan's pills, a brand of the drug Magnesium salicylate

== See also ==
- Ritsu Dōan (born 1998), Japanese footballer
- Doane (disambiguation)
- Doans, Indiana
