= Don Valley =

Don Valley may refer to:

== Australia ==
- Don Valley, Victoria, a suburb of Melbourne, Australia

== Canada ==
- Don Valley, the valley associated with the Don River in Toronto, Canada
  - Don Valley station, an LRT station on Line 5 Eglinton in Toronto, Canada
- Don Valley Parkway, a freeway
- Don Valley (Canadian electoral district), a federal electoral district represented in the Canadian House of Commons from 1968 to 1979

== England ==
Things associated with the valley of the River Don in Yorkshire:

- Don Valley Festival, the annual music and drama festival that takes place within the Don Valley area
- Don Valley (UK Parliament constituency), Doncaster
- Lower Don Valley, a mainly industrial area of Sheffield
- Don Valley Stadium, an athletics stadium in Sheffield

== See also ==
- Don River (disambiguation)
