= Garden Club of America Entrance Markers in Washington, D.C. =

- Garden Club of America Entrance Markers in Washington, D.C. MPS
- U.S. National Register of Historic Places
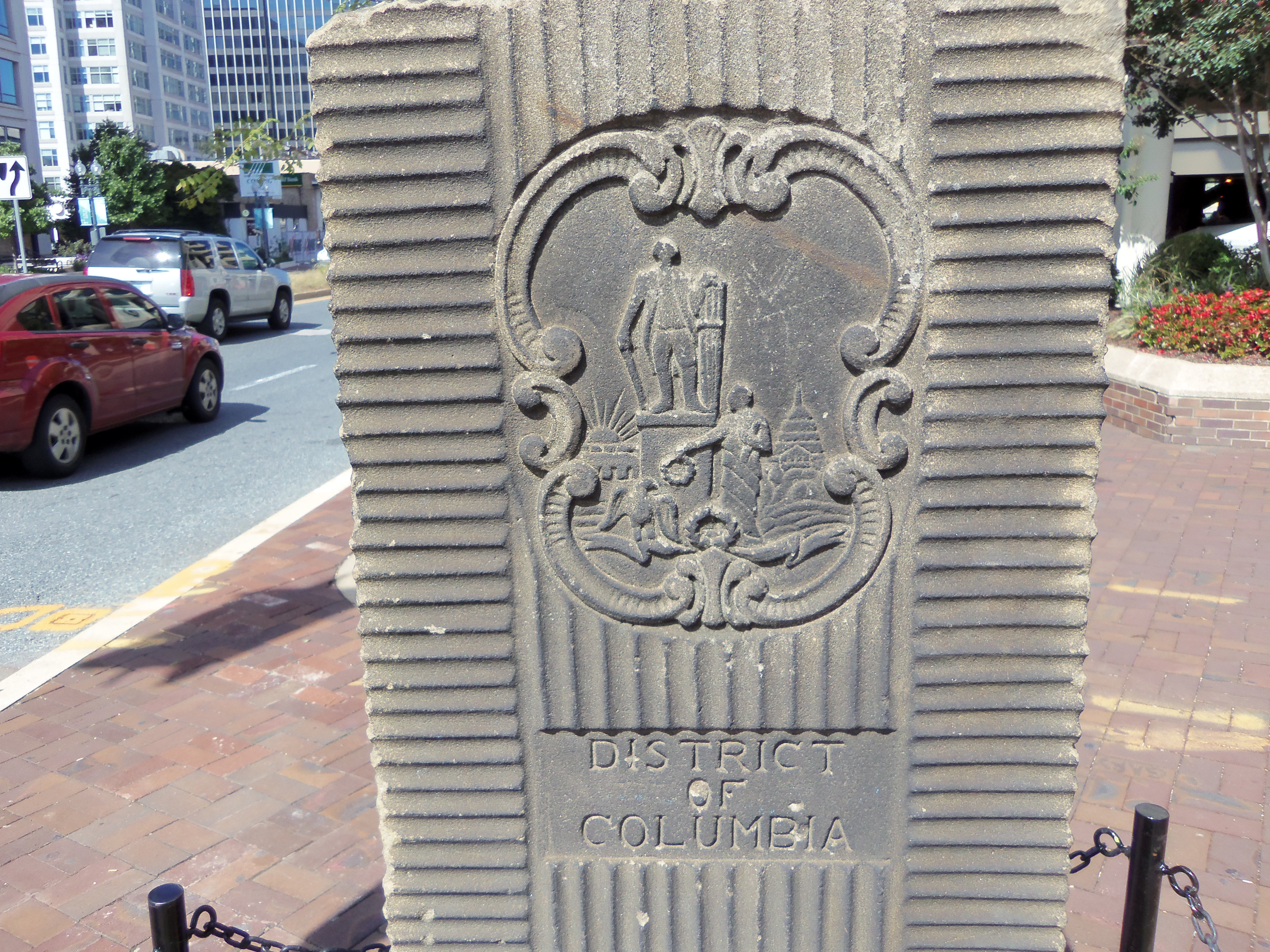
- Cartouche of the District of Columbia, 2012
- Architect: Edward W. Donn Jr.
- Architectural style: Late 19th and early 20th Century Movements
- NRHP reference No.: 64501007

The Garden Club of America Entrance Markers in Washington, D.C., are carven stone pylons installed along the border of the District of Columbia in 1932 and 1933 by local Garden Club of America chapters. Originally about five feet tall, the markers were placed at important entrance points to the national capital. Nine survive: sets of two markers in Westmoreland Circle, Friendship Heights, and Chevy Chase Circle, a single marker along Georgia Avenue, a single marker on the Arlington end of the Francis Scott Key Bridge, and a single marker in a yard on 42nd Street NW. These surviving markers are listed on the National Register of Historic Places.

== History and features of the markers ==
1942 photo of the Friendship Heights marker on the east side of Wisconsin Avenue.

The Garden Club decided to erect the markers in 1932 as part of the George Washington bicentennial celebration, which also saw the formal openings of the Arlington Memorial Bridge and the George Washington Memorial Parkway. The markers were planned with the National Capital Parks and Planning Commission and reviewed by the Commission of Fine Arts.

The markers were designed by architect Edward Donn, who based them on the milestones set up in 1761 along the Mason–Dixon line denoting the Pennsylvania-Maryland boundary. Installed between April 1932 and October 1933, the markers are composed of Aquia Creek sandstone and bear the Seal of Maryland on one side and the Cartouche of the District of Columbia on the opposite side. The cartouche depicts George Washington with Lady Justice, a laurel wreath, the rising sun, and the capitol dome.

Each stone was originally surrounded by fences consisting of chains supported by four bollards and planting schemes designed by the Maryland and Virginia chapters of the Garden Club. As the Club intended that the markers would notify people that they were passing a boundary, not all sit precisely on boundary lines.

The club installed at least 13 markers, including sets of two markers in Westmoreland Circle; Friendship Heights; Chevy Chase Circle; at the city's north portal at 16th Street NW near Silver Spring, Maryland; and at the Virginia ends of the Key Bridge and the Highway Bridge. A single marker was installed along Georgia Avenue.

The Virginia markers have disappeared, as have the 16th Street set. However, an entrance marker that does not resemble any that the Garden Club erected now stands at the north portal inside Blair Circle at the junction of Eastern Avenue, 16th Street NW, N. Portal Drive, and Colesville Road.

Each of the seven surviving markers show the effects of weathering, pollution, and other abuse. Motorists have knocked over some or all of these; many now stand well short of their original height. Some have been removed from their original locations and reinstalled nearby. The disposition of those that are no longer in place is now unknown.

In 2007, the markers were collectively submitted to the NRHP as a Multiple Property Submission, or MPS; they were added in 2008.

== Locations of the surviving markers ==
The current locations of the seven surviving markers are:

- Westmoreland Circle (two markers): Junction of Western Avenue and Massachusetts Avenue, NW. The markers are located opposite one another along the Western Avenue axis of the Circle, about two feet within the outside circumference of the circle. The westernmost marker stands beneath an oak tree and is surrounded by its original chain link fence. The easternmost marker stands in the open, without a protecting fence. The markers are between the Northwest No. 5 and Northwest No. 6 boundary markers of the original District of Columbia.
- Friendship Heights (two markers): Junction of Western Avenue and Wisconsin Avenue, near the Friendship Heights Metro Station. The markers are located on the east and west sides of Wisconsin Avenue, immediately north of Western Avenue. These markers are between the Northwest No. 6 and Northwest No. 7 boundary markers of the original District of Columbia.
- Chevy Chase Circle (two markers): Junction of Western Avenue and Connecticut Avenue. The markers are located well within the inside circumference of the circle, close to the Circle's east—west axis. Their sites are within the east and west sides of a grassy circle that lies between rings of azalea plantings and benches that form a perimeter around the centrally-placed Newlands Fountain. The plantings, grass and benches encircle a ring of stone paving that surrounds the fountain. These markers are between the Northwest No. 7 and Northwest No. 8 boundary markers of the original District of Columbia.
- Traffic island at the junction of Georgia Avenue, Alaska Avenue and Kalmia Road NW (one marker). The marker is located inside the triangular island's southeast corner, near the intersection of Georgia Avenue to the east and Kalmia Road to the south. A chain-link fence that bollards support surrounds the marker. A landscaped planting of shrubs is behind the marker.

The marker was formerly located inside a median in the center of Georgia Avenue, just north of the Avenue's intersection with Kalmia Road and Alaska Avenue. The marker is between the former site of the Northeast No. 1 and the present site of the Northeast No. 2 boundary markers of the original District of Columbia.

== List of the markers ==
The seven Garden Club of America Entrance Markers, beginning at Westmoreland Circle and proceeding clockwise.

Name	Image	Address	Coordinates	Neighborhood	Date listed on NRHP	Designation
Westmoreland Circle, west side	2026	Western Avenue and Massachusetts Avenue, NW (Reservation 559); West side of Circle	38°56′56″N 77°06′05″W	Westmoreland Circle	April 29, 2008	08000348
Westmoreland Circle, north side	2008	Western Avenue and Massachusetts Avenue, NW (Reservation 559); North side of Circle	38°56′57″N 77°06′03″W	Westmoreland Circle	April 29, 2008	08000348
Wisconsin Avenue, west side	2012	Wisconsin Avenue at Western Avenue; West corner of intersection	38°57′39″N 77°05′09″W	Friendship Heights	May 12, 2008	08000394
Wisconsin Avenue, north side	2005	Wisconsin Avenue at Western Avenue; North corner of intersection	38°57′40″N 77°05′09″W	Friendship Heights	May 12, 2008	08000394
Chevy Chase Circle, west side		Western Avenue and Connecticut Avenue (Reservation 335A); West of center of Circle	38°58′03″N 77°04′38″W	Chevy Chase Circle	April 29, 2008	08000346
Chevy Chase Circle, east side	2008	Western Avenue and Connecticut Avenue (Reservation 335A); East of center of Circle	38°58′03″N 77°04′37″W	Chevy Chase Circle	April 29, 2008	08000346
Georgia Avenue	2011	Traffic island between Georgia Avenue, Kalmia Road and Alaska Avenue; Southeast corner of island	38°59′02″N 77°01′36″W	Shepherd Park	April 29, 2008	08000347

== See also ==
- Boundary Markers of the Original District of Columbia
