= Don Bridge (disambiguation) =

Don Bridge or Donbridge or variant, may refer to:

- Don Bridge, South Yorkshire, England, UK; across the River Don
- Jarrow Bridge (formerly Don Bridge), Jarrow, South Tyneside, England, UK; across the River Don
- Don Bridge, Kingston Road (Toronto), Ontario, Canada; a road bridge over the Don River
- The Donbridge School, Rumukwuta, Obio-Akpor, Port Harcourt, Rivers State, Nigeria
- Sir Herbert Donbridge, a fictional character from Invisible Enemy (film)

== See also ==
- Bridge of Don (disambiguation)
- Don River Bridge (disambiguation)
- Don River (disambiguation)
- Bridge (disambiguation)
- Don (disambiguation)
