= Francis Griffith Newlands Memorial Fountain =

Historic fountain in Washington, D.C., United States

- U.S. National Register of Historic Places
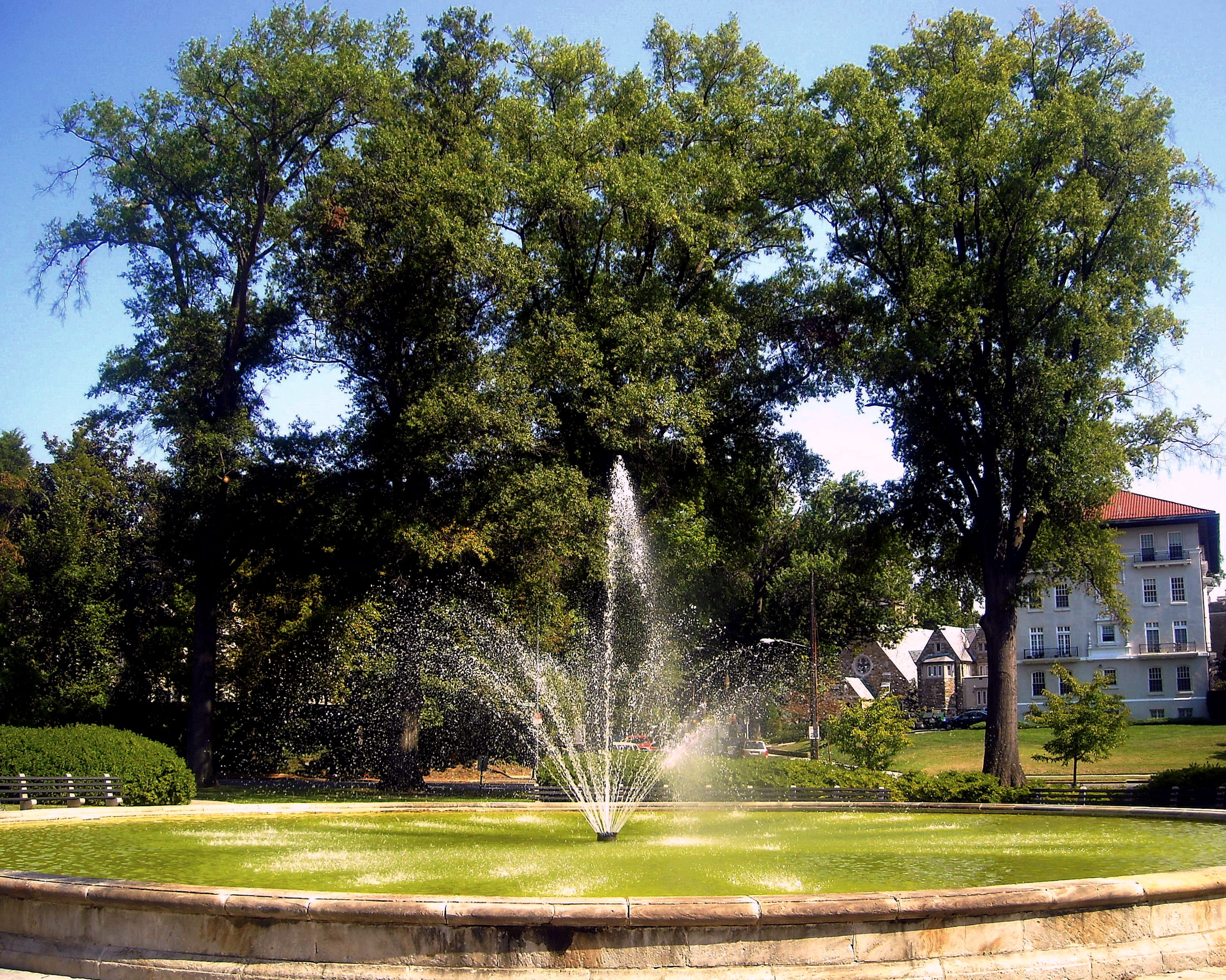

- Location within District of Columbia
- Location: Chevy Chase Circle, N.W. Washington, D.C.
- Coordinates: 38°58′3.4″N 77°4′37.74″W
- Built: 1938
- Architect: Edward Wilton Donn
- NRHP reference No.: 07001058
- Added to NRHP: October 12, 2007

Francis Griffith Newlands Memorial Fountain is a fountain in Chevy Chase Circle on the border between the Chevy Chase neighborhood of Northwest Washington, D.C., and Chevy Chase Village, Maryland. Built in 1938, the fountain is named for Francis G. Newlands, a founder of Chevy Chase and a U.S. lawmaker. Today, it is controlled and operated by the National Park Service as part of nearby Rock Creek Park.

== Namesake ==
The fountain honors Newlands, a U.S. senator and land developer. In the late 1880s, he and his business partners purchased more 1,700 acres (690 ha) of land along present-day Connecticut Avenue, which his Chevy Chase Land Company used to develop whites-only neighborhoods on the D.C.-Maryland border that Newlands named "Chevy Chase" to honor his Scottish ancestral homeland. In 1902, Newland sponsored the Newlands Reclamation Act, which allowed the federal government to begin irrigation of the West. He was an outspoken white supremacist, antisemite, and segregationist who advocated the repeal of the 15th Amendment to deprive African-Americans of the right to vote.

== History ==
The fountain was designed by Edward W. Donn Jr. in 1933, 16 years after Newlands' death, and erected in 1938. The project was funded by Newlands' widow, who spent $12,000 (about $270,000 today) on it.

The fountain, a 60-foot circle made of sandstone and concrete, sits in the center of Chevy Chase Circle. It throws a two-inch jet of water 30 feet in the air.

In 1990, the Land Company refurbished the fountain to recognize the 100th anniversary of the founding of Chevy Chase. The fountain was rededicated and recognized by the National Register of Historic Places.

=== Proposed renaming ===
In December 2014, the Chevy Chase Advisory Neighborhood Commission (ANC) considered a proposal to rename the fountain due to Newlands' white supremacist views. On December 8, the Historic Chevy Chase DC Board voted to support changing the name to Chevy Chase Fountain; a report chronicled the debate. The descendants of Newlands opposed the renaming. The ANC voted 4-2 (1 abstention) to table the motion and consider it later.

A bronze plaque at the fountain contained an inscription reading "His Statesmanship Held True Regard For The Interests Of All Men." In 2020, the ANC voted to have the plaque removed.

On February 23, 2021, Delegate Eleanor Holmes Norton, D-D.C., introduced a bill to require the National Park Service to rename the fountain. Designated H.R. 1256 and named the Francis G. Newlands Memorial Removal Act, it was referred to the Subcommittee on National Parks, Forests, and Public Lands of the House Natural Resources Committee on March 23, 2021. On April 19, 2022, the Montgomery County Council adopted a resolution proclaiming its support for the bill. After a compromise with the National Park Service, the fountain's name was kept but a panel detailing Newlands' white supremacist beliefs was installed.

In 2025, the sign was removed after President Donald Trump signed an executive order directing federal agencies to review “ideological indoctrination”.

== See also ==
- National Register of Historic Places listings in the upper NW Quadrant of Washington, D.C.
