= Don =

Don, don or DON and variants may refer to:

== Titles and roles ==
- Don (honorific), a Spanish, Portuguese, and Italian title of respect, often used for noblemen or distinguished individuals
- Don (academia), a senior member (fellow or tutor) of a college or university, especially at Oxford or Cambridge
- Don, a crime boss, especially in Mafia contexts

== Places ==
- Don River (disambiguation), several rivers with this name
  - Don (river), in European Russia
- Don, Tasmania, a small village near Devonport, Australia
- Don, Benin, a town in Benin
- Don Jail, a historic jail in Toronto, Canada
- Don, Nord, a commune in northern France
- Don, Dang, a hill station village in Gujarat, India
- County Donegal, Ireland (Chapman code "DON")
- Don, Trentino, a commune in Trentino, Italy
- Don Republic, a short-lived state (1918–1920) in Russia
- Don, West Virginia, an unincorporated community in the U.S.

== People and characters ==
=== Given name or nickname ===
- Don (given name), including a list of people and fictional characters
- Don (nickname), list of notable individuals
- George Don (1798–1856), Scottish botanist
- Khadi Don (born 1996), American comedian and actress

=== Fictional characters ===
- Don (character), the central gangster character of the Don film franchise
- Don, lead character in Jumbo
- Don Gately, in the 1996 novel Infinite Jest
- Doggy Don, the main character in Pakdam Pakdai
- Don, a Helper with Dee Animated Malaysian Series in Chuck Chicken

== Arts, entertainment, and media ==
=== Films ===
- Don (franchise), an Indian gangster film franchise
  - Don (1978 film), Hindi film by Chandra Barot
  - Don (2006 Hindi film), Hindi remake by Farhan Akhtar
    - Don (soundtrack), soundtrack of the 2006 remake
  - Don 2 (2011), sequel to the 2006 remake
    - Don 2: The Game, video game based on the sequel
- Don (2003 film), Kannada-language Indian film by P. N. Sathya
- Don (2006 Dutch film), directed by Arend Steenbergen
- Don (2007 film), Telugu-language Indian film starring Nagarjuna and Anushka
  - Don Number One, 2012 Bangladeshi remake starring Shakib Khan
- Don (2022 film), Tamil-language Indian film by Cibi Chakaravarthi

=== Television ===
- Don (TV series), a 2007 Indian reality/crime documentary series
- "Don", an episode from Regular Show

=== Music ===
- "Don", a song by Miranda! from Sin Restricciones (2004)
- "Don", a 2020 song by Trippie Redd

=== Other media ===
- Battle Stadium D.O.N, a 2006 crossover fighting video game

== Military and defense ==
- Department of the Navy (DoN), part of the U.S. Department of Defense
- Don-class submarine tenders, used by the Soviet Navy
- Don-2N radar, Russian anti-ballistic missile radar
- Orlets-1 (code-named DON), a Russian reconnaissance satellite

== Science and technology ==
=== Chemistry ===
- Dissolved organic nitrogen (DON), a form of nitrogen in water systems, involved in freshwater and marine biogeochemical cycles
- 2,5-Dimethoxy-4-nitroamphetamine (DON), a psychedelic compound
- 6-Diazo-5-oxo-L-norleucine (DON), a glutamine analog and enzyme inhibitor
- Deoxynivalenol (DON), a type of mycotoxin

=== Biology ===
- "-don", a taxonomic suffix meaning "tooth" in scientific names
- Dysbaric osteonecrosis, bone damage from pressure changes
- Russian Don, a horse breed from Russia

== Other uses ==
- Dôn, a Welsh mother goddess in mythology
- Don (unit), a traditional Korean unit of weight
- Donburi, also known as "don", a Japanese rice bowl dish
- Tropical Storm Don (2011), a named Atlantic storm
- Director of nursing (long term care facility), abbreviated as DON
- SS Don

== See also ==
- The Don (disambiguation)
- Don Bridge (disambiguation)
- Dom (disambiguation)
- Dons (disambiguation)
- Donald (disambiguation)
- Dawn (disambiguation)
- Donn (disambiguation)
- Donne (disambiguation)
