= Donn (disambiguation) =

Donn is the Lord of the Dead in Irish mythology.

Donn may also refer to:

- Donn (given name), masculine given name and byname in Irish
- Donn (surname)
- Donn-Byrne
- Donn Cuailnge, a magical bull from Irish mythology
- Donn Handicap
- 4689 Donn, a main-belt asteroid
- FK Donn, a Norwegian football club

== See also ==
- Dôn, the Welsh mother goddess
- Dawn (disambiguation)
- Don (disambiguation)
- Donne (disambiguation)
