= Donald (disambiguation) =

Donald is a Goidelic given name.

Donald may also refer to:

== Towns ==
- Donald, Georgia, a small town in the United States
- Donald, Wisconsin, an unincorporated community in the United States
- Donald, Victoria, a town in western Victoria, Australia
- Donald, British Columbia, Canada, a ghost town

== Other uses ==
- Donald (hill)
- Clan Donald, a Scottish kinship group
- Donald (surname), including a list of people and fictional characters

== See also ==
- Don (disambiguation)
- Donnie (disambiguation)
- Doland (disambiguation)
- The Donald (disambiguation)
- Macdonald (disambiguation)
