= Doland =

Doland may refer to:

- Doland, South Dakota, a city in Spink County, South Dakota, United States
- George Doland, a British businessman and Conservative politician
- James Doland, an Australian legislator

== See also ==
- Dolan (disambiguation)
- Donald (disambiguation)
