= Dons =

Dons or The Dons may refer to:

== Association football ==
- Aberdeen F.C., a Scottish professional football club
- Hendon F.C., an English semi-professional football club
- Lisburn Rovers F.C., a Northern Irish intermediate football club
- Wimbledon F.C., a former English professional football club from London which relocated to Milton Keynes in 2003, and the two clubs that emerged from the surrounding controversy:
  - AFC Wimbledon, founded by disaffected Wimbledon F.C. supporters in 2002
  - Milton Keynes Dons F.C., as Wimbledon F.C. was renamed in 2004

== Other sports ==
- Doncaster R.L.F.C., an English rugby league club from Doncaster, South Yorkshire
- Dorton Dons, a tug-of-war team based in Dorton, Buckinghamshire
- Essendon Football Club, an Australian rules football club
- The Los Angeles Dons, an American football team that played in the defunct All-America Football Conference in 1946–49
- The athletic teams of Loyola Blakefield school in Maryland
- San Francisco Dons, the athletic teams of the University of San Francisco, California
- Wimbledon Dons, an English motorcycle speedway team from Wimbledon, London

== People ==
- Aage Dons (1903–1993), Danish writer
- Christian Dons
- Erik Dons (1915–2002), Norwegian diplomat
- Hans Dons (1882–1940), Norwegian naval officer and aviator
- Henny Dons (1874–1966), Norwegian educator and inner missionary
- Dons (singer) (born 1984), Latvian singer

== Other uses ==
- The Dons, an area in Baldwin Hills, Los Angeles
- Dons, Santa Barbara High School mascot
- Dons, Spanish Fork High School mascot
- dons (unit), small Korean units of weight
- McDonald's, American fast food chain

== See also ==
- Don (disambiguation)
