= Branden Miller =

American actor and comedian

- Born: Branden Miller; February 10, 1991 (age 35)
- Other names: Playboi Branden; Miss Prada; Joanne Prada; Joanne the Scammer
- Occupations: Actor; Porn star
- Years active: 2008–present
- Known for: Joanne the Scammer

Branden Miller (born February 10, 1991) is an actor and comedian known for creating and portraying the fictional Joanne the Scammer, also known as Joanne Prada. The character gained notoriety for Miller's Twitter account, which posts from Joanne's perspective, and Miller's Instagram account, which consists of various videos of Joanne's character. As of May 2018, his Instagram account has nearly two million followers and his Twitter account has nearly 700,000 followers. His social media posts often discuss themes of scamming, being "fake" or "petty", and parody on being a white woman.

== Personal life ==
Branden Miller was raised in Hopewell, Virginia, and adopted by Buddy and Veronica Miller. In 2002, his adoptive father died of cancer.

Miller claims he had a difficult time discussing his homosexuality with his classmates, and described himself as "trade". He came out to his family and friends after his sister discovered gay porn on his computer, and says he was not shown support from his mother, who claimed his sexuality was unbiblical. Miller discovered at the age of 17 that he was adopted, and that he was born to a mother of Puerto Rican descent and a black father of unspecified heritage.

After becoming aware of his adoption, Miller began to dress in drag every day for several months. He dropped out of high school before graduation.

Before creating the character of Joanne, Miller began starring in pornographic videos on "cam sites" at the age of 18, under the pseudonym "Playboi Branden". In his pornographic videos, he would "act straight" in order to appeal to those who fetishized "gay-for-pay" men.

== Character ==
=== "Miss Prada" and conception ===
Miller says that Joanne's creation was inspired by videos made by YouTube personality Cara Cunningham, mainly her video "Leave Britney Alone". She was initially created as the character "Miss Prada", and had the role of a prostitute. Miller uploaded videos to YouTube of his character "Miss Prada", who would often proclaim her infatuation for singer Chris Brown and make sexual advances towards various men. The character was also inspired by the discovery of his adoption, which he says he wanted to "run away" from. The character also stemmed from Miller's belief that "every modern white woman is a scammer".

Joanne's appearance typically includes a fur coat and a mid-length blonde wig.

In May 2016, Miller was emailed by an anonymous person claiming to work for Twitter, who would "verify" his account if he provided certain information. However, the anonymous person deleted Joanne's account instead. The person asked for $500 in return for the Twitter account, which Miller refused to pay. Eventually, the Twitter handle was returned to Miller and was also verified.

In August 2016, Miller joined the entertainment network Super Deluxe to begin creating a series of videos starring Joanne the Scammer. The first, entitled "Caucasian Living with Joanne the Scammer", stars actress Chelsea Peretti. Miller also starred in an 8-minute long Thelma & Louise-themed short entitled "Khadi & Joanne", which also starred internet personality and comedian Khadi Don, and was produced by Super Deluxe as well.

=== Reception ===
Joanne the Scammer has received attention from various notable figures such as Selena Gomez, Katy Perry, Solange Knowles, Teyana Taylor, Ariana Grande, Amber Rose, Rowan Blanchard, Sky Ferreira, Chelsea Peretti, and others. Miller was invited to the 2016 MTV Video Music Awards for his portrayal of the character of Joanne. Miller co-hosted Amber Rose's annual SlutWalk Festival in 2016.

The Fader describes Joanne as "a fiercely independent hot mess who goes to obscene, hilarious lengths to look out for herself" and "a byproduct of how frightening and lonely the world can feel". Teen Vogue describes the character as "a self-proclaimed 'messy b*tch who lives for the drama'". Paper Magazine calls Joanne "a gorgeously exaggerated meshing of meme culture and the darkness of the deep web and Craigslist with elements of gender fluidity, hip-hop and the ball scene tossed in". The Huffington Post says that Joanne gained popularity through "embezzlement and offensive remarks". BuzzFeed called her "a hilarious and compelling character that has become wildly popular on Twitter". The character also appeared in Fergie's music video for "Tension". The character had a cameo appearance in Tyler Perry’s A Madea Family Funeral.

== Discography ==
=== Albums ===
List of Albums, with selected details
Title	Details
Pussy Power Prada	Released: 2013; Label: Independently Released
Queen of Pop	• Released: June 29, 2015 • Label: Independently Released
Queen of Rap	• Released: Late 2015 • Label: Independently Released
Queen of Pop 2	• Released: Mid 2016 • Label: Independently Released
Joanne the Scammer	• Released: Mid 2016 • Label: Independently Released

=== Extended plays ===
List of EPs, with selected details
Title	Details
Miss Prada	• Released; July 31, 2014 Label: Independently Released
Queen of Pop: Exposed (with Ayesha Erotica)	Released: February 2, 2016; Label: Independently Released
Bossip	• Released: January 6, 2017
CUTENESS	• February 28, 2026 • Label: Independently Released

=== Singles ===
List of singles as lead artist, showing year released and originating album
Title	Year	Album
"Voodoo Pussy”	2011	Non Album Singles
"HIV"	2011	Non Album Singles
“Hey I Dare You (To Come Serve Me)	2012	Non Album Singles
“Big Dick”	2012	Non Album Singles
“My Pussy Smells Like Roses”	2012	Non Album Singles
"Push Up Bra”	2013	Non Album Singles
"Miss Prada"	2014	Non Album Singles
“Gutta” (featuring Ayesha Erotica and Cashsus Clay)	2015	Queen of Rap
“Ride Around” (with Ayesha Erotica)	2016	Sick At Home
“Fetch”	2016	Queen of Pop 2
“Learning” (With LSDXOXO)	2016	Queen of Pop 2
“Deepthroat” (with Ayesha Erotica)	2016	Queen of Pop 2
“Bump”	2016	Queen of Pop 2
Literal Legand (Hey bb call me sometime) (featuring Ocean Kelly)	2016	Bossip
“Stroke” (with Samie)	2016	
“Daddy’s Little Hoe”	2019	Non Album Singles
“Where Did Ayesha Go”	2020	Non Album Singles
“Wet”	2020	Non Album Singles
“Young Money Audition”	2020	Non Album Singles
“Here I am With A Gun”	2020	Non Album Singles
“Emily Rose”	2022	Non Album Singles
“Yes” (with Bimbo Brat”	2023	Non Album Singles
“Local Where?” (With Demiluvvsu”	2023	Non Album Singles
“Sausage HQ”	2024	Non Album Singles
“Make A Wish” (featuring Ayesha Erotica and Strrgurl)	2024	Non Album Singles
“2009 B.T.T.P”	2025	Non Album Singles
”I Can’t Stop Farting”	2025	Non Album Singles
“Get Outta My Face”	2025	Non Album Singles
“Bossip”	2025	Non Album Singles

== Filmography ==
Year	Title	Role	Notes
2016	Caucasian Living	Miss Prada	Webseries, 3 episodes,
2016	Joanne & Khadi	Joanne The Scammer	Short film,
2017	Double Dutchess: Seeing Double	Joanne The Scammer	Film
2019	A Madea Family Funeral	Joanne The Scammer	Film
