= Miss Europe 1948 =

International beauty pageant

- Date: June 6, 1948
- Venue: Enghien-les-Bains, France
- Entrants: 12
- Withdrawals: England, Greece, Hungary, Norway, Soviet Union, Spain, Sweden
- Returns: Austria, Czechoslovakia, Great Britain, Italy
- Winner: Jacqueline Donny; France

Miss Europe 1948 was the 12th annual Miss Europe. The Miss Europe pageant was cancelled for 9 years due to the onset of World War II. The pageant came back with new sponsors and with only 12 entrants. The new sponsors were Mr. Roger Zeiler (of both the Moulin Rouge and the French Committee of Elegance) and Claude Berr, both of whom later created the Mondial Events Organization (MEO). MEO owned the pageant until after Miss Europe 2002, when Zeiler and the Mondial Events Org. sold the pageant to Endemol France (the French branch of the Dutch company Endemol). This was the 1st edition under Mondial Events. No new contestants competed but some returning countries came back.

== Results ==
=== Placements ===
Results of Preliminary Contest	Contestant
1st Place	France – Jacqueline Donny
2nd Place	Finland – Anna-Liisa Leppänen
3rd Place	Switzerland – Helena Sutter

Placement	Contestant
Miss Europe 1948	France – Jacqueline Donny
Undetermined	Italy – Rossana Martini †; Austria – Ingrid Jonaszin

== Delegates ==
- Austria – Ingrid Jonaszin
- Belgium – Odette Schollaert
- Czechoslovakia – UNKNOWN
- Denmark – UNKNOWN
- Finland – Anna-Liisa Leppänen
- France – Jacqueline Donny
- Great Britain – Pamela Bayliss
- Italy – Rossana Martini
- Switzerland – Helena Sutter
- Yugoslavia – UNKNOWN
