= Doane =

Doane may refer to:

== Places ==
- Doane, West Virginia, United States
- Doane Road or Regional Road 45, York Region, Ontario, Canada
- Doane Peak, Grand Teton National Park, Wyoming, US
- Doane Rock, Eastham, Massachusetts, US
- Doane's Falls, Royalston, Massachusetts, US

== Schools ==
- Doane Academy, Burlington, New Jersey, US
- Doane Stuart School, Rensselaer, New York, US
- Doane University, Crete, Nebraska, US

== Given name ==
- Doane Perry (born 1954), American musician
- Doane Robinson (1856–1946), American historian and father of the Mount Rushmore National Memorial

== Surname ==
- Brigham Doane (born 1981), American professional hardcore wrestler
- D. Howard Doane (1883–1984), American agricultural expert
- George Washington Doane (1799–1859), American churchman and bishop
- Gustavus Cheyney Doane (1840–1892), U.S. Army Cavalry, member of Washburn-Langford-Doane Expedition
- Henry Doane (1905–1999), American landscape painter and commercial artist
- John Doane (c. 1590–1685/6), early settler of Eastham, Massachusetts
- J. Chalmers Doane (born 1938), Canadian musician and educator
- Ken Doane (born 1986), American professional wrestler
- Mary Ann Doane (born 1952), American professor
- Melanie Doane (born 1967), Canadian pop singer-songwriter
- Pelagie Doane (1906–1966), American illustrator and writer of children's books
- Percy Gray Doane (1877–1945), American philatelic dealer
- Rennie Wilbur Doane (1871–1942), American entomologist
- Seth Doane (born 1978), American journalist
- William Croswell Doane (1832–1913), American Bishop of the Episcopal church
- William Howard Doane (1832–1915), American hymn writer

== See also ==
- Doan (disambiguation)
- Duane (disambiguation)
