= Donn (surname) =

Donn is a surname. Notable people with the surname include:

- Edward W. Donn Jr. (1868–1953), American architect
- James Donn (1758–1813), English botanist
- Jorge Donn (1947–1992), Argentine ballet dancer
- Nigel Donn (born 1962), English former professional association football player
