= Chevy Chase (Washington, D.C.) =

Neighborhood of Washington, D.C., U.S.

Chevy Chase, Washington, D.C.
- Neighborhood of Washington, D.C.
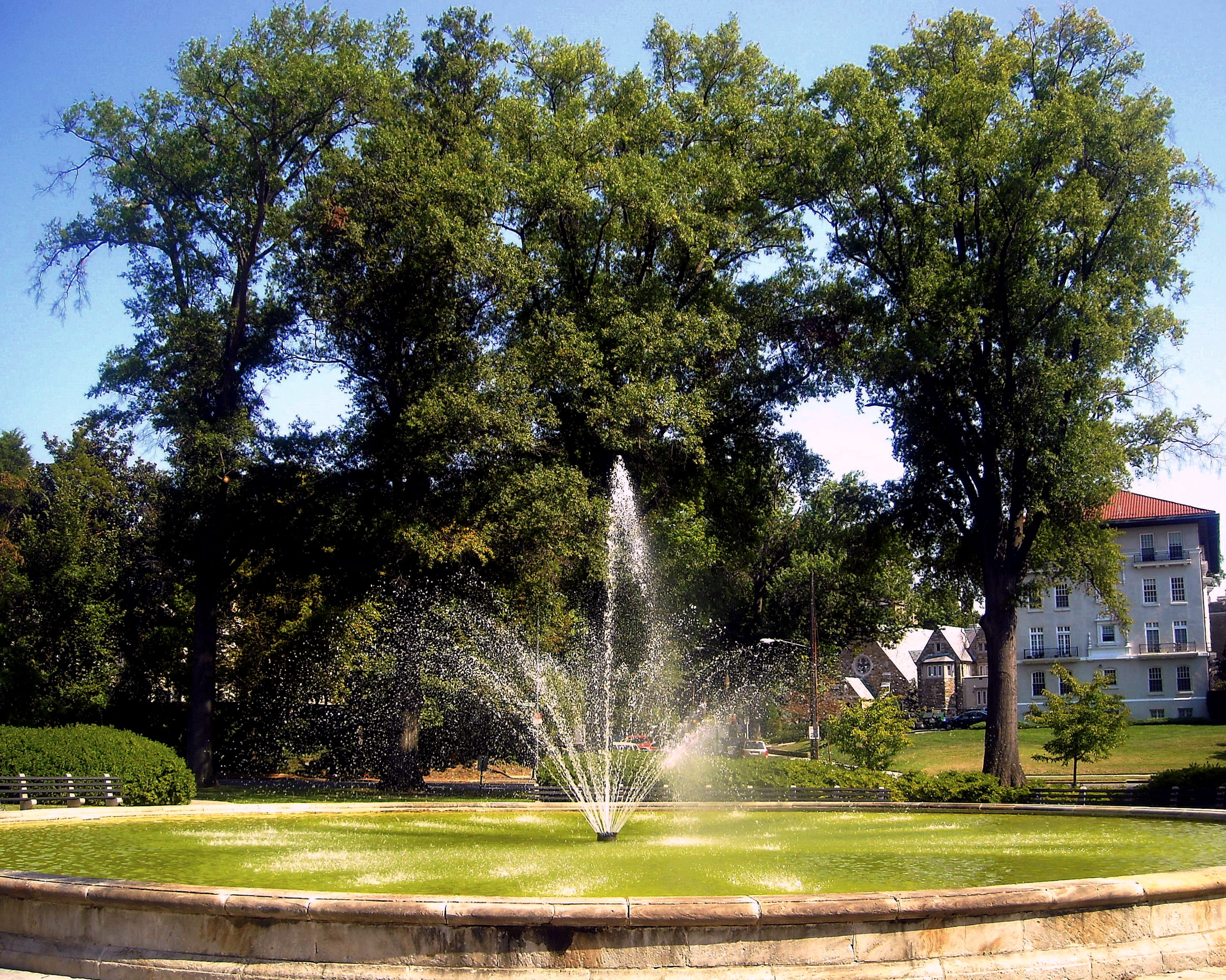
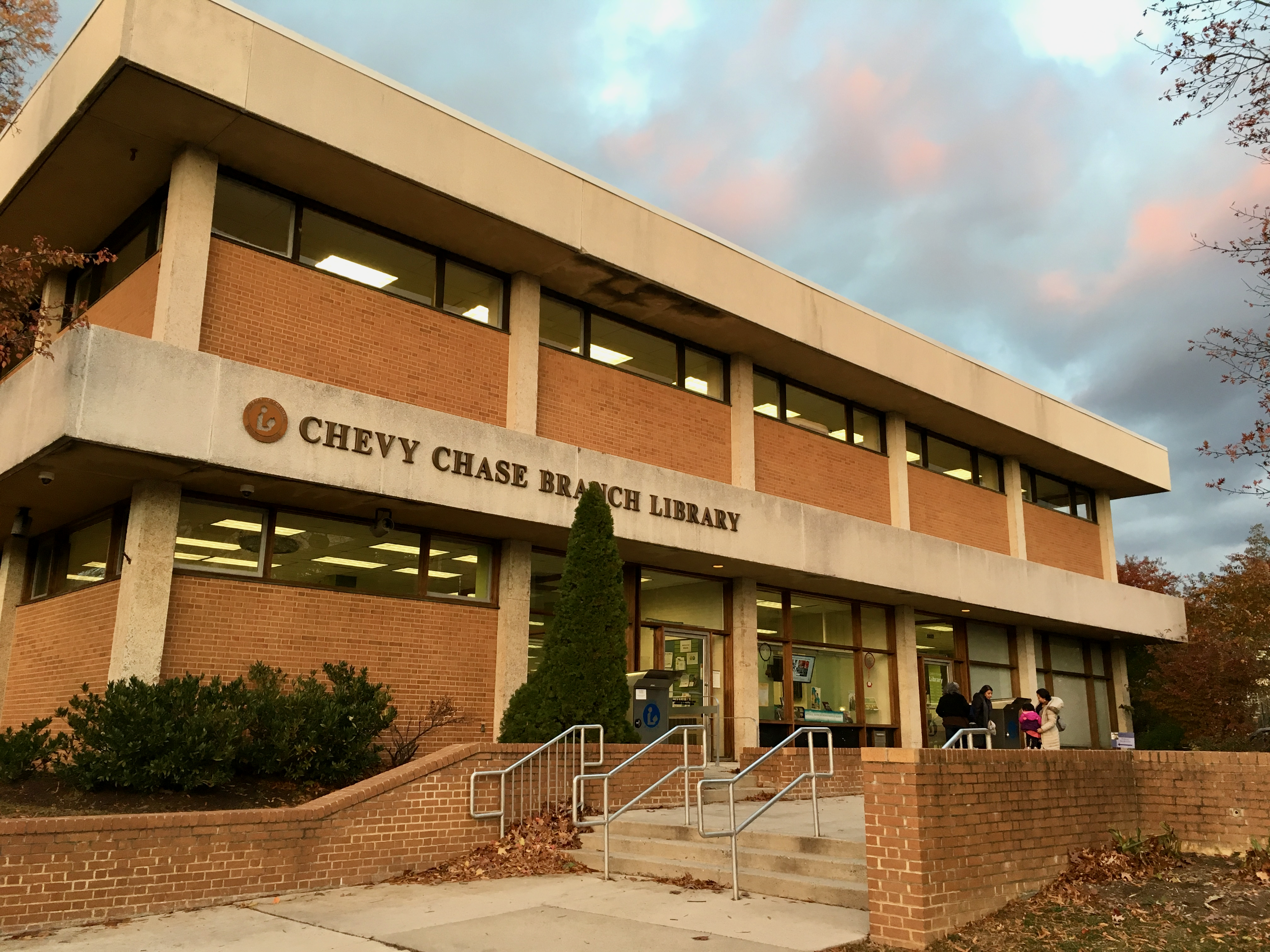
- The Francis G. Newlands Memorial Fountain in Chevy Chase Circle, left; and the Chevy Chase Neighborhood Library.

- Map of Washington, D.C., with Chevy Chase highlighted in red
- Coordinates: 38.9727°N 77.0642°W
- Country: United States
- District: Washington, D.C.
- Ward: Ward 3/4

Government
  - Councilmember: Matthew Frumin / Janeese Lewis George
- Postal code: ZIP code

Chevy Chase (/ˈtʃɛviː tʃeɪs/) is a neighborhood in northwest Washington, D.C. It borders Chevy Chase, Maryland.

== Geography ==
The neighborhood is generally agreed to be bounded by Rock Creek Park on the east, Western Avenue (which divides D.C. and Maryland) and Tennyson Street on the north, and, to the west, Reno Road and the Friendship Heights neighborhood. Opinions differ on the southern boundary, where Chevy Chase meets Forest Hills, but many residents consider it to be Broad Branch Road between 32nd and 27th Streets. The main roads leading in and out of Chevy Chase, D.C. are Connecticut Avenue, Nebraska Avenue, Reno Road, Military Road and Western Avenue. The area is served by the C81, C83, C85, and D70 Metrobus lines. Chevy Chase is within walking distance of three Red Line stations: Van Ness-UDC, Tenleytown-AU, and Friendship Heights. The public schools that serve Chevy Chase are Lafayette Elementary, Ben W. Murch Elementary, Alice Deal Middle School, and Jackson-Reed High School.

== History ==
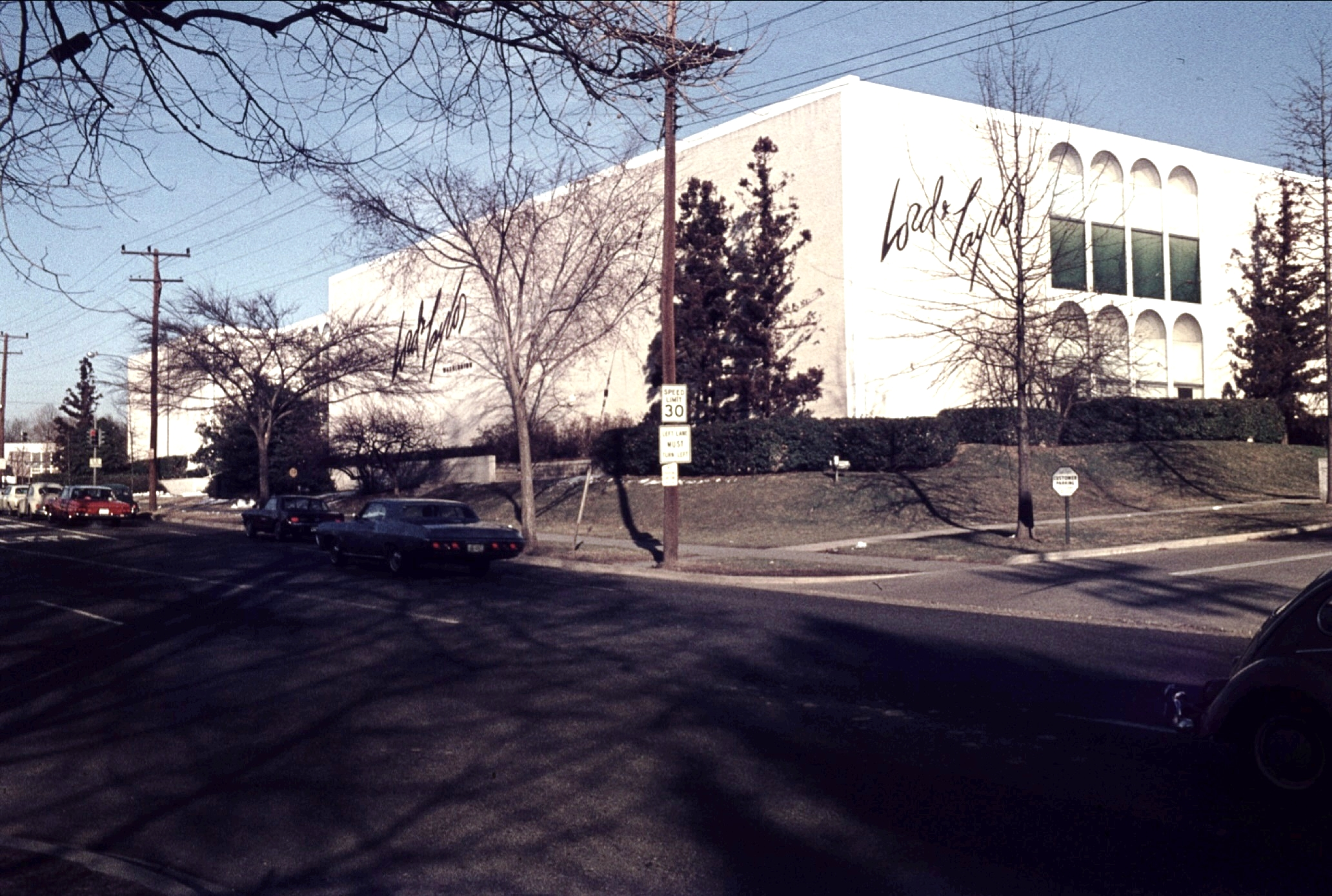
Lord & Taylor in Chevy Chase, near the Maryland state line, in 1970.

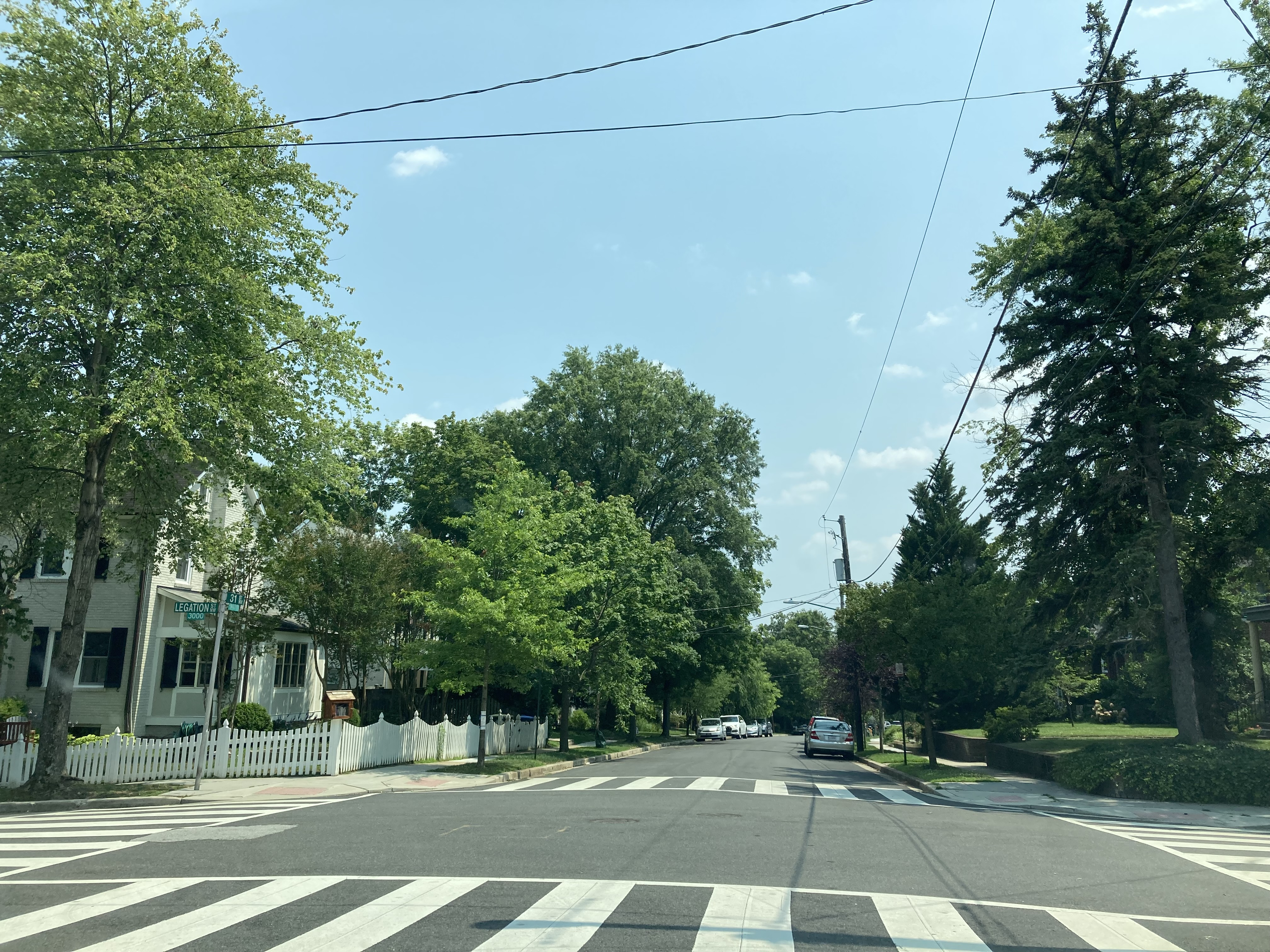
Intersection of 31st St. and Legation St. NW, July 2021, in Chevy Chase.

In the late 1880s, then-Representative Francis G. Newlands of Nevada and his partners began to buy up farmland in northwest Washington, D.C., and southern Montgomery County, Maryland, to develop a residential streetcar suburb. (See Washington streetcars.) They founded the Chevy Chase Land Company in 1890, and its eventual holdings are now known as this neighborhood and Chevy Chase, Maryland. Chevy Chase, D.C. was developed beginning in the early 1900s after construction was completed on the Chevy Chase Line, a streetcar line stretching to and beyond the northwestern boundary of the District of Columbia, thereby linking the area to downtown. Over succeeding decades, the formerly remote area was transformed from farmland and woods to middle-class housing. Chevy Chase D.C. includes many kit houses, including Sears Catalog Homes and others, a popular housing option in the early twentieth century that allowed individuals of modest means to order by mail the materials and instructions for a home and build it themselves.

The neighborhood's major commercial road is Connecticut Avenue NW. The street is home to commercial establishments, apartments, a community center, and a regional branch of the D.C. Public Library. Unlike many urban neighborhoods that have lost local businesses to large chains and suburban malls, the small, generally locally owned businesses along Connecticut Avenue remain and are well patronized by the local population. These businesses include Magruder's Supermarket, established in 1875; and the Avalon Theatre, which opened in 1923 as a silent film house and ran until the theater underwent renovations in 2003. The Avalon thereafter reopened as a non-profit movie theater.

The area's parks include Rock Creek Park, Lafayette-Pointer Park, and Livingston Park.

=== Electoral boundaries redrawn ===
Until 2002, the entire neighborhood was located in Ward 3. After the 2000 census revealed an increase in population in Ward 3 and a decrease in population in Ward 4, the Council of the District of Columbia voted to reassign the portion of the neighborhood east of Broad Branch Road to Ward 4 as of January 1, 2002. Many residents were upset at the decision. The Chevy Chase Civic Association sued to prevent the redistricting on the grounds that it would reduce African American voting strength in Ward 3 and would result in unconstitutional and racially motivated gerrymandering. The U.S. District Court for the District of Columbia upheld the redistricting, as did the U.S. Court of Appeals. After the redistricting, the neighborhood's Advisory Neighborhood Commission was called 3/4G.

In 2023, the Chevy Chase DC Conservancy (CCDCC) applied to designate the neighborhood a historic district by the District’s Historic Preservation Review Board.

== Education ==
The neighborhood is served by the District of Columbia Public Schools, including Lafayette Elementary, Alice Deal Junior High School, and Jackson-Reed High School. Private schools in Chevy Chase D.C. include St. John's College High School, a private, co-educational Catholic high school; and Blessed Sacrament School, a Catholic elementary school that enrolls some non-parishioners and non-Catholics.

The District of Columbia Public Library operates the Chevy Chase Neighborhood Library.
