= Executive Order 14253 =

2025 US order to review federal depictions of history

- Restoring Truth and Sanity to American History
- Front page of Executive Order 14253
- Type: Executive order
- Number: 14245
- President: Donald Trump
- Signed: March 31, 2025

Federal Register details
- Federal Register document number: 2025-05838
- Publication date: April 3, 2025

Summary
- Effects how the Smithsonian Institution and its properties cover American values and seeks to remove improper ideology from such properties; Ensures all monuments, memorials, statues and markers within the Department of the Interior's jurisdiction do not contain descriptions, depictions, or other content that inappropriately disparage Americans past or living; Reinstates any pre-existing monuments, memorials, statues and markers that have been removed or changed to "perpetuate a false reconstruction of American history, inappropriately minimize the value of certain historical events or figures, or include any other improper partisan ideology"

Executive Order 14253, titled "Restoring Truth and Sanity to American History", is an executive order signed by Donald Trump on March 31, 2025.

The order seeks to shape how the Smithsonian Institution's museums, education, research centers, and the National Zoo characterize American history, aiming to "remove improper ideology from such properties" in order to project "a symbol of inspiration and American greatness".

The order calls for the Department of the Interior to determine whether, since January 1, 2020, any monuments, memorials, statues and markers, within the department's jurisdiction contain any descriptions, depictions, or other content that "inappropriately disparage Americans past or living (including persons living in colonial times)". Additionally, it orders the reinstatement of any pre-existing monuments, memorials, statues, and markers that have been removed or changed to "perpetuate a false reconstruction of American history, inappropriately minimize the value of certain historical events or figures, or include any other improper partisan ideology."

The National Park Service subsequently removed or flagged for removal signage and educational content at at least 25 sites in the National Park System including those relating to slavery and Black history, Native American history, climate change and conservation, and LGBTQ history.

== Provisions ==
Executive Order 14253 calls for the Vice President, the Secretary of the Interior, the Speaker of the House of Representatives, the Director of the Office of Management and Budget working with Congress, the Assistant to the President for Domestic Policy and Senior Associate Staff Secretary, Lindsey Halligan to enforce its policies "including by seeking to remove improper ideology from such properties" and "recommend to the President any additional actions necessary to fully effectuate such policies."

The order states that future appropriations to the Smithsonian Institution shall be informed by these guidelines and prohibits expenditure on exhibits or programs that degrade shared American values, divide Americans based on race, or promote programs or ideologies inconsistent with Federal law and policy". It stipulates that the Smithsonian Institution must "celebrate the achievements of women in the American Women's History Museum" and "not recognize men as women in any respect in the Museum."

The order also directs the Secretary of the Interior to determine whether, since January 1, 2020, monuments, memorials, statues and markers, within the departments jurisdiction contain any descriptions, depictions, or other content "inappropriately disparage Americans past or living (including persons living in colonial times)". The department is also ordered to reinstate any pre-existing monuments, memorials, statues and markers that have been removed or changed to "perpetuate a false reconstruction of American history, inappropriately minimize the value of certain historical events or figures, or include any other improper partisan ideology." Trump directed federal officials to take action on materials that "inappropriately disparage Americans" in order to emphasize "progress of the American people" and the "grandeur of the American landscape."

== Background ==
During the first 100 days of his second term, Trump focused on cultural organizations like the Kennedy Center and the Institute of Museum and Library Services, which he alleged were influenced by a "woke" and "race-centered" ideology.

In Executive Order 14253, he made various claims about the institution, such as that "the National Museum of African American History and Culture has proclaimed that 'hard work', 'individualism', and 'the nuclear family' are aspects of 'White culture.'"

== Impact ==
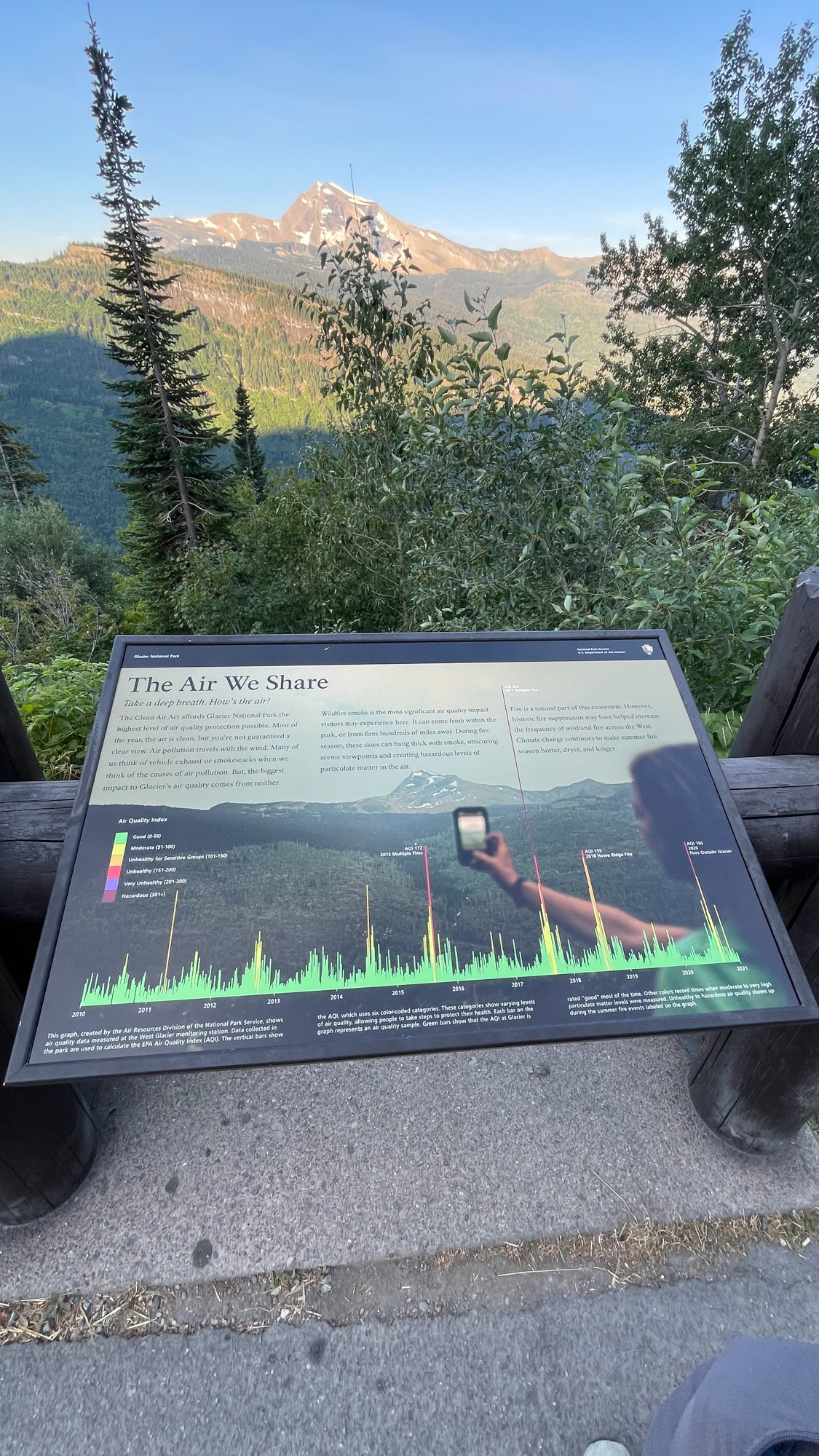
"The Air We Share" Wayside Exhibit in Glacier National Park was "flagged" by reviewers.

The National Park Service initiated a review of materials presented to visitors at all its 433 national parks, monuments, and historic sites. Signs asking visitors to report "any signs or other information that are negative about past or living Americans" were placed in parks.

A panel on the white supremacist beliefs of Francis G. Newlands was removed from the Francis Griffith Newlands Memorial Fountain in 2025. Exhibit panels on enslaved people owned by George Washington at the President's House in Philadelphia were removed on January 22, 2026. The city of Philadelphia filed a lawsuit the same day, seeking a preliminary injunction to restore the removed exhibits, which had been installed under a cooperative agreement with local funding. In February 2026, federal judge Cynthia M. Rufe ruled that panels depicting enslaved lives must be reinstated at the President's House site in Philadelphia. In her judgement she quoted from George Orwell's dystopian Nineteen Eighty-Four and wrote:

As if the Ministry of Truth in George Orwell's 1984 now existed, with its motto "Ignorance is Strength," this Court is now asked to determine whether the federal government has the power it claims—to dissemble and disassemble historical truths when it has some domain over historical facts. It does not.

Parts of an exhibit at Grand Canyon National Park mentioning the impact of settlers, cattle ranchers, and tourism on the regional environment and local native tribes were removed. References to the impact of climate change and rising sea levels on Fort Sumter and Fort Moultrie National Historical Park were removed in January 2026. The Trump administration also censored content related to Native Americans at Grand Teton National Park, Hubbell Trading Post National Historic Site, and Little Bighorn Battlefield National Monument; related to transgender activists at Stonewall National Monument; and related to climate change at Glacier National Park, Organ Pipe Cactus National Monument, and Acadia National Park.

A coalition led by the National Parks Conservation Association filed suit against the Department of the Interior, stating that the actions to remove educational materials violated the Administrative Procedure Act. A June 2026, a preliminary injunction was issued by a federal court, ordering the administration to restore signs and exhibits at national parks covering topics such as slavery, climate change and Indigenous history. The court found that their removal set "a dangerous precedent of censorship and sanitization" and stated: "History cannot be faithfully told while excluding the experiences of communities whose contributions, struggles, and achievements form an important part of our Nation’s story.". The material is to be restored by July 4, in time for the US semiquincentennial celebrations.

== Report ==
On July 4, 2026, the White House's Domestic Policy Council released a 162-page report, "Saving America's Story: How Ideological Capture at the Smithsonian Institution's National Museum of American History Erases Our Heritage", accusing the National Museum of American History of "extreme political activism" that uses American history "as a political instrument to divide, dispirit and discourage our citizens" and undermine love of country. The report was lauded by conservatives and criticized by the Organization of American Historians, which said the report sought to punish the museum for presenting history in ways that are "accessible to and reflective of all Americans".

== See also ==
- 2025 United States government online resource removals
