= Donnie (disambiguation) =

Donnie or Donny is a masculine given name. It may also refer to:

== Television ==
- Donny!, an American comedy television series
- "Donny", an episode of the TV series Adventure Time

== Music ==
- "Donnie" (song), from the 1998 Ace of Base album Flowers
- "Donnie", a 1968 song by TV host Chuck Barris, B-side of "Baja California"
- "Donnie", a 1974 song by R. Dean Taylor, B-side of "Window Shopping"
- Donny (album), 1974 album by Donny Osmond

== Surname ==
- Auguste Donny (1851–?), French sailor who competed in the 1900 Summer Olympics
- Jacqueline Donny (1927–2021), French model and beauty pageant contestant, Miss France and Miss Europe 1948

== Places ==
- Doncaster, a city in the UK

== See also ==
- Donald
