= Edward W. Donn Jr. =

American architect (1868–1953)

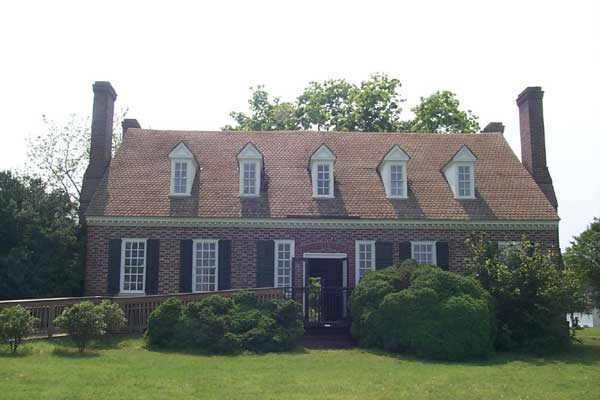
The George Washington Memorial House

Edward Wilton Donn Jr. (April 2, 1868 in Washington, D.C.–1953) was an American architect of the early 20th century.

Donn was most famous for his association with Waddy Wood as part of the architectural firm of Wood, Donn & Deming (see Waddy Wood for a description of the firm and for a list of their works), but is also well known for his design of Memorial House at George Washington Birthplace National Monument.

== Career ==
Edward W. Donn Jr.'s father and namesake was an architect and Donn Jr. followed his career. As a young architect he worked with Theodore Fredrich Laist and Waddy Butler Wood, eventually forming a firm with Wood and William I. Deming.

After Wood, Donn & Deming dissolved, Donn went on his own. In the late 1920s, over the objections of Frederick Law Olmsted, a decision was made to build a replica of the house in which George Washington was born on the excavated foundation of the destroyed home. Donn worked on a design based on the rectangular foundation discovered by George Washington Parke Custis in June 1815, and on descriptions of the house as a "house of ten or twelve rooms, of two stories in height, with an ell, and probably, not much dissimilar or smaller than Gunston Hall....."

In 1927 the U.S. Fine Arts Commission and the Secretary of War approved a design based on Donn's interpretation and the Memorial House was finished in time for George Washington's 200th birthday in 1932.

The Memorial House foundation was later revealed to be the foundation of a large rectangular out building, perhaps a barn. By 1934, the National Park Service conducted an extensive archeological survey of Popes Creek. Archeologists uncovered the ruins of George Washington's birth home, yielding 16,000 artifacts, many of which had been intensely heated by a fire.

As part of the memorial tributes on the occasion of the 200th anniversary of Washington's birth, Donn oversaw the stonework on the columns in Westmoreland Circle, working with stonecutter Walter Phelps.

== Works ==
- George Washington Memorial House, George Washington Birthplace National Monument, VA; 1927
- "Kenmore" House, George Washington's sister, Betty Washington Lewis, Fredericksburg, VA
- Falmouth log cabin restoration, the corner of Butler Road and Carter Street, Stafford County, VA; 1930, known locally as Hobby School, built on another location in 1880s
- Garden Club of America Entrance Markers, Washington, D.C.; 1932
- Francis Griffith Newlands Memorial Fountain, Chevy Chase Circle, Washington, D.C.; 1933
- U.S. Powder Factory and Naval Proving Grounds, Indian Head, Maryland
