= Don Valley Festival =

Don Valley Festival (previously known as the 'Mexborough and District Music and Drama Festival') was established in 1912.

The Festival is accredited to the British & International Federation of Festivals. The Festival is a Registered Charity within the United Kingdom, with registered charity number: 1043437.
