= Don River (Victoria) =

River in Victoria, Australia

Don
- Location of the Don River mouth in Victoria

Location
- Country: Australia
- State: Victoria
- Region: Central Victoria (IBRA), Yarra Valley
- Local government area: Yarra Ranges

Physical characteristics
- Source: Yarra Ranges, Great Dividing Range
  - location: below Mount Toolebewong
  - coordinates: 37°42′02″S 145°34′34″E
- Mouth: confluence with the Yarra River
  - location: near Don Valley
  - coordinates: 37°46′7″S 145°34′35″E

Basin features
- River system: Port Phillip catchment

The Don River is a perennial river of the Port Phillip catchment, in the Central region of the Australian state of Victoria.

== Location and features ==
The Don River rises below Mount Toolebewong, part of the Yarra Ranges of the Great Dividing Range, in remote country within the Yarra Ranges National Park. The river flows generally south by west before reaching its confluence with the Yarra River near Don Valley.

== See also ==
- List of rivers of Australia § Victoria
