= The Donald =

The Donald may refer to:

- Donald Trump, U.S. president
- r/The_Donald, former discussion forum about Donald Trump on Reddit

== See also ==
- Donald (disambiguation)
- Clan Donald
