= Võ Phiến =

Vietnamese archivist, editor and author

Võ Phiến (born Đoàn Thế Nhơn, October 20, 1925 – September 28, 2015) was an archivist, editor and author of short stories, novels, essays, poems, and literary criticism from South Vietnam. His brother, Lê Vĩnh Hòa, was a writer for the Viet Cong. An influential writer in the Vietnamese diaspora, Phiến’s writings deal with themes relating to exile, war, and modern life. He was already an established writer in Vietnam before seeking refuge in the United States after the fall of Saigon in 1975, where he lived and continued to write until his death in 2015. Phiến’s work was written entirely in Vietnamese, and very few of his works have been translated into English. Phiến died at his home in Santa Ana, California on September 28, 2015, at the age of 90.
