= Don River Bridge, Bowen =

Don River Bridge
- Coordinates: 19°58′57″S 148°12′14″E
- Carries: Motor vehicles
- Crosses: Don River
- Locale: Bowen, Queensland, Australia

Characteristics
- Material: Reinforced concrete

Location
- Interactive map of Don River Bridge

The Don River Bridge is a road bridge that carries the Bruce Highway across the Don River, located near Bowen, Queensland, Australia.

== See also ==
- Don River Bridge, Rannes
