= Don River (North Queensland) =

Don
- Location of Don River mouth in Queensland

Location
- Country: Australia
- State: Queensland
- Region: North Queensland
- City: Bowen

Physical characteristics
- Source: Clarke Range
  - location: below Mount Roundhill
  - coordinates: 20°33′46″S 148°16′19″E
  - elevation: 253 m (830 ft)
- Mouth: Coral Sea
  - location: near Bowen
  - coordinates: 19°56′52″S 148°09′55″E
  - elevation: 50 m (160 ft)
- Length: 60 km (37 mi)
- Basin size: 1,200 km^{2} (460 sq mi) to 1,116.8 km^{2} (431.2 sq mi)
- Discharge
  - location: Near mouth
  - average: 8.5 m^{3}/s (270 GL/a)

Basin features
- Tributaries
  - left: Bluff Creek, Humbug Creek, Monte Christo Creek, Boundary Creek (Queensland), Selina Creek
  - right: Wild Creek, Oaky Creek (Queensland), Spring Creek (Queensland), Simon Creek (Queensland), Ida Creek, Menilden Creek, Grasstree Creek, Police Camp Creek
- National park: Eungella National Park

The Don River is a river in North Queensland, Australia.

== Course and features ==
The Don River rises in the Clarke Range, part of the Great Dividing Range, below Mount Roundhill and west of Proserpine. The river flows generally north by northeast through the Eungella National Park and is joined by thirteen minor tributaries, towards its mouth and empties into the Coral Sea north of Bowen. With a catchment area of 1,200 square kilometres (460 sq mi), the river descends 253 metres (830 ft) over its 60-kilometre (37 mi) course.

High salinity levels have been recorded at the mouth of the river. Land use in the upper catchment is mostly beef cattle production with crops grown in the richer soils downstream.

The river is crossed by the Bruce Highway via the Don River Bridge at Bowen.

=== Flooding ===
The highest recorded flood was in 1970 when the river reached 7.25 metres (23.8 ft) at the Bowen Pumping Station. The river delta is particularly vulnerable to flooding during cyclones.

Floods in 2008 left deposits of sand which raised the riverbed considerably. Approval to dredge sand was granted by the Queensland Government, however only about half of that has been removed in recent years. A flood in 2008 lead the Whitsunday Regional Council to create a channel so that similar flooding could be avoided.

A management plan for the river was established late in 2008. It included measures to encourage further sand extraction.

=== Don River Dash ===
Since first held in 2019, usually early September, the Don River bed hosts the annual off-road motor racing event known as the Don River Dash 300, which features all-terrain vehicles, dune buggies, trophy trucks and motocross bikes, which enter on the Don River starting at the Pits Area at the Bowen Showgrounds along Inverdon Road then at the end of Millers Lane just past the Lindsay Transport Depot Shed. The track distance is a 25 km ride or drive down the Don River bed before making a turn around at the turn around point to head back up the Don River to complete the 50 km loop. The race format is two 150 km length races for two days, completing three lap loops down and back up the Don River bed.

== See also ==
- List of rivers of Australia § Queensland
