= Don (TV series) =

- A promotional logo image of "Don".
- Country of origin: India

Production
- Running time: 24 minutes

Original release
- Network: Zee TV
- Release: June 2007 – 23 August 2007

Don is an Indian reality TV series in the form of a documentary that was initially launched for Zee News, but later was aired on Zee TV. It was hosted by Irfan Khan.

Don features true stories from the underworld gangs and mafia and showcases the people involved in running a parallel world that exists and flourishes out of Mumbai (especially in Dubai). The show broadcasts rare footage and photographs and also gives an insight into the journey of some ordinary people who made it 'big' in the underworld business. It probes into the innermost secrets of the dreaded Dons - about how they planned and executed some of the biggest crimes in history. These stories will also take a perspective from their sharp shooters who used to protect them, the drivers who used to listen to the Don's most intimate conversations, and their bodyguards who were their shadow at all times. In addition, it will show some important confessions by senior police officials, who faced the wrath of these Dons but finally triumphed by driving them out of their dens. The show basically discusses the top underworld dons such as Daud Abraham, Abu Salem et cetera.

== Anchor/host ==
- Irfan Khan
