= Western Avenue (Washington, D.C.) =

- Western Avenue NW
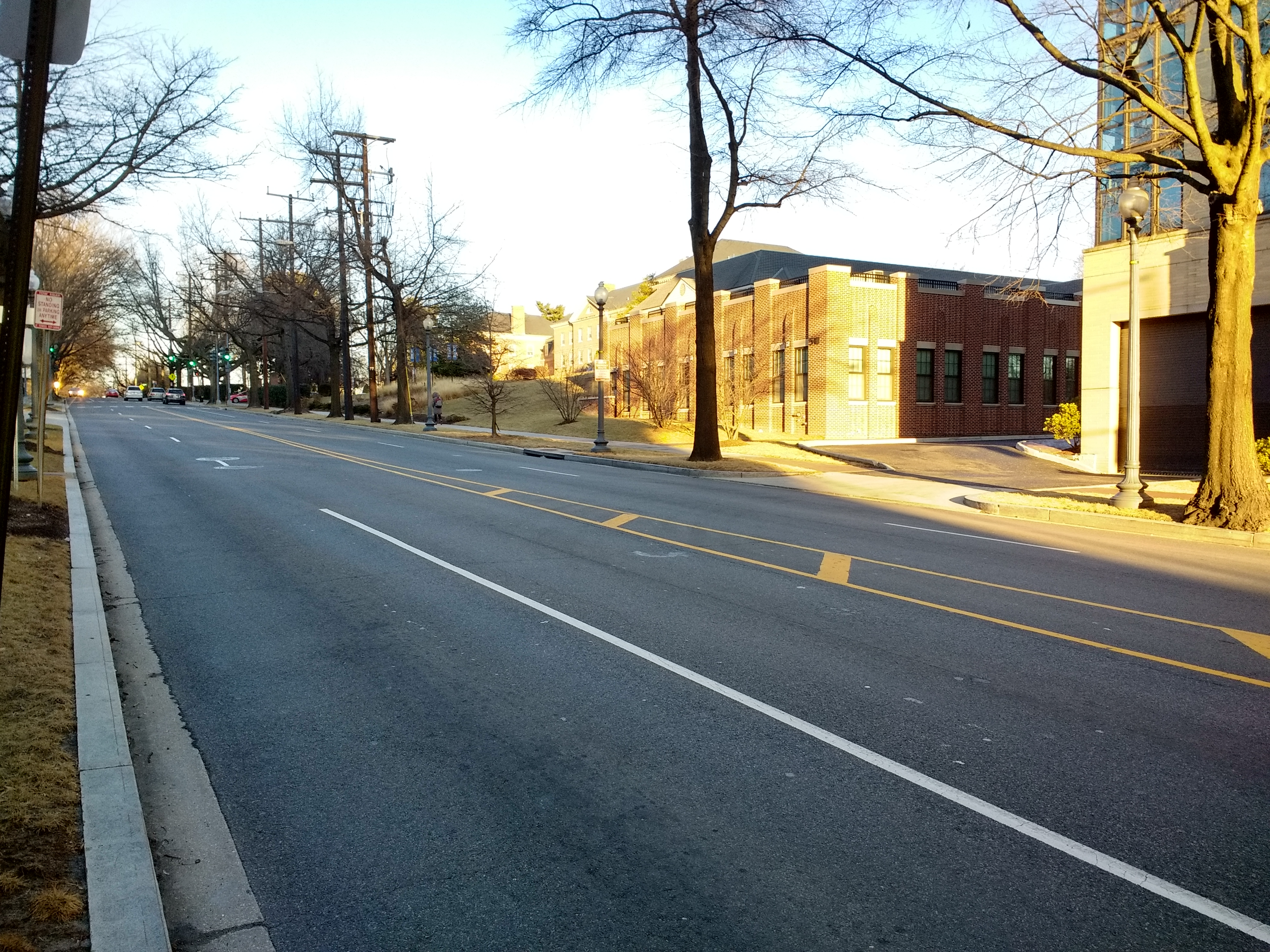
- Interactive map of Western Avenue
- Former names: Columbia Boulevard, Boundary Avenue
- Owner: District of Columbia
- Maintained by: DDOT
- Length: 3.5 mi (5.6 km)
- Location: Northwest, Washington, D.C.
- Nearest metro station: Friendship Heights
- Coordinates: 38.966735°N 77.078174°W
- West end: MD 396 (Westmoreland Circle)
- Major junctions: MD 355 (Wisconsin Avenue); MD 185 / Chevy Chase Circle
- East end: Oregon Avenue NW

Construction
- Commissioned: January 1893
- Construction start: c. 1900
- Completion: c. 1931

Other
- Designer: U.S. Army Corps of Engineers

Western Avenue is one of three boundary streets between Washington, D.C., and the state of Maryland. It runs about 3.5 miles (5.6 km) due northeast from Westmoreland Circle to Oregon Avenue NW. First proposed in 1893, it was constructed somewhat fitfully from about 1900 to 1931.

== Description ==
Western Avenue passes through largely residential neighborhoods on its journey north until it reaches the retail-heavy Friendship Heights neighborhood, where it crosses Wisconsin Avenue NW. After a short distance north through more residential areas, it passes through Chevy Chase Circle, where it crosses Connecticut Avenue NW. Its remaining length is again residential, passing through Pinehurst Circle until it reached Oregon Avenue NW. For most of its length it is a two-lane street with curbside parking, although it widens to four lanes around the traffic-heavy Friendship Heights area. The street lies entirely within the District of Columbia and is itself not the boundary of the city, which "runs right through the front lawns of the houses on the Maryland side of Western Avenue."

== History ==
Originally, government officials did not foresee that the city of Washington would expand to fill the boundaries of the entire District of Columbia. The "Federal City", or City of Washington, originally lay within an area bounded by 15th Street (east), East Capitol Street, the Anacostia River, the Potomac River, Rock Creek, and, on the northwest and northeast, Boundary Street. This latter street was renamed Florida Avenue in 1890 as the city began expanding into the rural areas of what was then known as "Washington County".

In January 1893, the Anthropological Society of Washington issued a report calling for a "grand avenue or boulevard to form the boundary of the District of Columbia on the three land sides". The United States Coast and Geodetic Survey map for 1894 shows no street having been constructed along the District's northwest boundary.

But by 1903, a real estate atlas of the area showed a "Columbia Boulevard" beginning just northeast of 48th Street NW and continuing northeastward along the D.C. border to near the nine-mile boundary stone, just west of Rock Creek. Around Chevy Chase Circle, the street name changed to "Boundary Avenue", which resumed at the intersection of the D.C. border and what is now Parkside Drive NW, and continued uninterrupted to the North Corner Boundary Stone. Boundary Avenue existed before August 1901, when the Commissioners of the District of Columbia (the city's federally appointed government) ordered its name be changed to "West Avenue".

Press reports made it clear that Western Avenue did not exist along the entirety of its current full length. In January 1905, local citizens asked that Western Avenue be created and macadamized from Westmoreland Circle to Chevy Chase Circle. The United States Army Corps of Engineers, which had authority over public works in the city at the time, approved the request in August. In October 1906, the Corps created a graded section of unpaved road along the two blocks from Chevy Chase Circle to Rittenhouse Street NW.

By 1907, much of Western Avenue from Chevy Chase Circle to Rock Creek had been cleared of trees and brush but not graded. Grading had not occurred all the way to Westmoreland Circle, and city officials asked that the Corps do so in October 1911. But the following year, Corps officials declined to condemn any more land between 41st Street NW south to the Receiving Reservoir (now known as Dalecarlia Reservoir) to complete the avenue.

By 1915, some extensions of Western Avenue had occurred. The United States Geological Survey reported that Western Avenue now extended from Davenport Street NW to River Road NW, from 41st Street NW to Rittenhouse Street NW, and from Broad Branch Road NW to Pinehurst Circle NW. Thus, only about 45 percent of the future avenue had been created. By 1918, portions of Western Avenue near Rock Creek Park were at least planned if not completed. A survey of the area in 1918 shows the block between Oregon Avenue NW and 31st Street NW, with an extension moving southwest.

As more development occurred in the area, more segments of Western Avenue were finished. In May 1924, the Corps of Engineers announced that property owners along 75 percent of the Western Avenue route had willingly sold land for the street. The government had been forced to seek condemnation proceedings against the remaining landlords. Two months later, the city purchased the tract bounded by 41st Street NW, Livingston Street NW, and Western Avenue NW for a city park (now Chevy Chase Recreation Center). By December 1924, Western Avenue between Westmoreland Circle and 41st Street NW had been completely cleared and graded, and was due to be paved. Portions of the avenue had still not been purchased from private landowners by September 1925, however, and the city government asked Congress for legislation that would provide a faster way to condemn land for the street.

The city continued to maintain and even upgrade those portions of Western Avenue which were complete, however. Although the avenue between Tennyson Street NW and Pinehurst Circle was still a dirt road, the city regraded it in December 1925 to keep it in good shape. The avenue from Tennyson Street NW to 43rd Street NW was graded in August 1926, and the Corps paved the two blocks of Western Avenue between 41st Street NW and Chevy Chase Circle in February 1929. The city was also pursued major improvements to the avenue. In 1925, the city asked that a "monumental treatment" of the junction of Eastern and Western Avenues be approved. The United States Commission of Fine Arts, which had statutory authority to review such designs, gave its approval to the idea in March 1926. No such junction was ever created, however.

By 1929, Western Avenue existed as an all-weather road from Westmoreland Circle to Pinehurst Circle. The following year, the National Capital Planning Commission approved the construction of a traffic circle at Friendships Heights to allow a more pleasing mix of traffic where Western Avenue, Military Road NW, and Wisconsin Avenue NW came together. By 1931, the final portions of Western Avenue had still not yet been completed, but Montgomery County citizens were pressing for it.

== Notable attractions ==
Fort Bayard, an American Civil War fort listed on the National Register of Historic Places, is located on Western Avenue NW between River Road NW and 47th Street NW. As of 2011, Friendship Heights — which is largely bisected by Western Avenue — has become one of the most fashionable places in Maryland and the District of Columbia to live and shop.

== Bibliography ==
- Cooling III, Benjamin Franklin and Owen, Walton H. Mr. Lincoln's Forts: A Guide to the Civil War Defenses of Washington. Lanham, Md.: Scarecrow Press, 2010.
- Scott, Pamela. "'A City Designed As A Work of Art': The Emergence of the Senate Park Commission's Monumental Core." In Designing the Nation's Capital: The 1901 Plan for Washington, D.C. Washington, D.C.: U.S. Commission of Fine Arts, 2006.
- Williams, Paul Kelsey. Greater U Street. Charleston, S.C.: Arcadia, 2002.
- Zibart, Eve. The Unofficial Guide to Washington, D.C. Hoboken, N.J.: John Wiley & Sons, 2011.
