= Chevy Chase Circle =

Traffic circle and park on the Washington, D.C. – Maryland border

Coordinates: 38°58′3.40″N 77°4′37.74″W

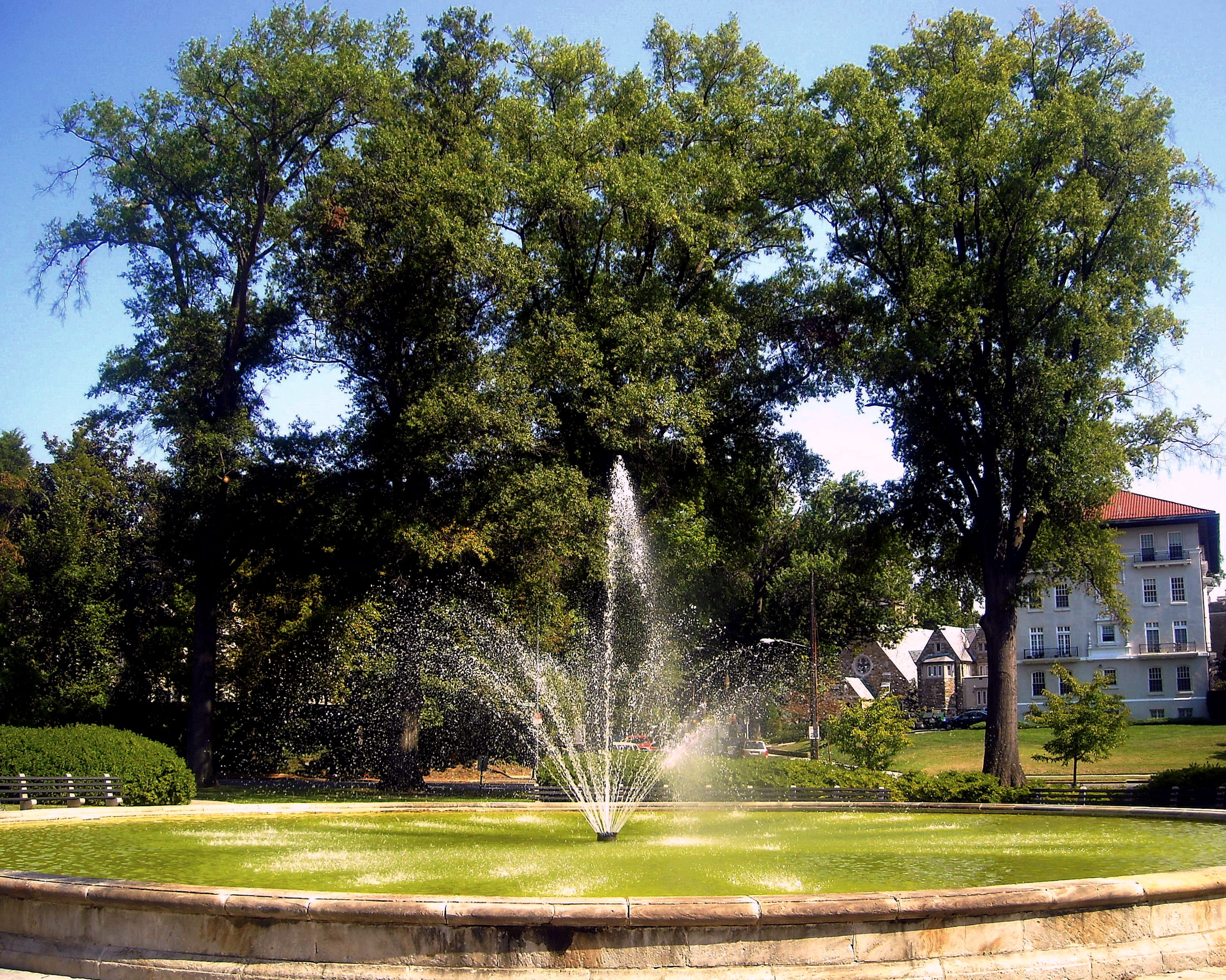
- The Francis Griffith Newlands Memorial Fountain at the center of Chevy Chase Circle

Location
- Washington, DC and Chevy Chase, MD
- Roads at junction: MD 185; Connecticut Avenue NW; Western Avenue; Chevy Chase Parkway NW; Magnolia Parkway; Various other local roads

Construction
- Type: Traffic circle
- Maintained by: DDOT, MDSHA

Chevy Chase Circle is a traffic circle (or roundabout) straddling the border of Chevy Chase, Washington, D.C., and Chevy Chase, Maryland. It sits upon the convergence of Western Avenue, Grafton Street, Magnolia Parkway, Chevy Chase Parkway NW, and Connecticut Avenue (signed as Maryland Route 185 in Maryland). The center of the circle is occupied by the Francis Griffith Newlands Memorial Fountain.

== History ==
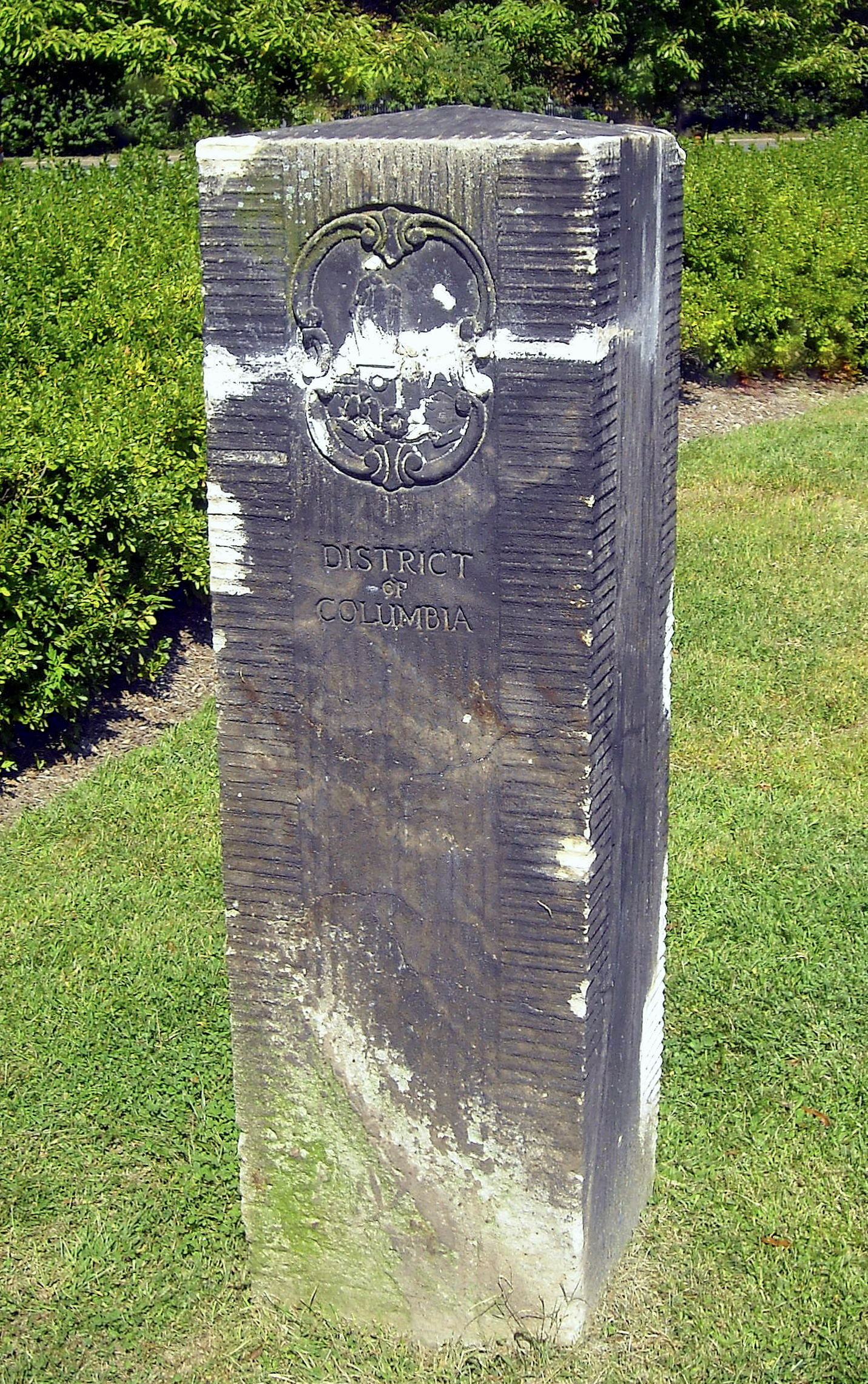
Garden Club of America entrance marker in Chevy Chase Circle. The stone pylon was made in 1933.

The circle was built around 1890 by the Chevy Chase Land Company as part of its construction of the northern extension of Connecticut Avenue from the Rock Creek gorge. The circle marks the lone bend in the road’s five-mile stretch between Rock Creek and its original terminus at Coquelin Run. The company had initially planned to grade the road in a straight line to Rockville, Maryland, but could not acquire the necessary land at the desired price, and so turned due north at the D.C.-Maryland border.

A streetcar line—first named the Rock Creek Railway, later the Capital Traction Company—ran through the circle. It would operate until Sept. 15, 1935, when its service was replaced by buses.

All Saints' Episcopal Church opened on Chevy Chase Circle on December 1, 1901. It was built in the Gothic style of architecture on land donated by The Chevy Chase Land Company. Rev. Dr. Thomas S. Childs was its first pastor.

Chevy Chase Presbyterian Church, also on Chevy Chase Circle, was built in 1911. Rev. Dr. Hubert Rex Johnson was its first pastor.

The Shrine of the Most Blessed Sacrament Church was canonically established in 1911. A simple, temporary church was built at that time, with construction of the present church beginning in 1925. The cornerstone was blessed by Bishop Thomas J. Shahan, rector of the Catholic University of America. The new Church opened on November 6, 1927. Archbishop Michael Joseph Curley officiated at the dedicatory service.

In 1933, the Garden Club of American installed stone entrance markers on the east and west sides of a grassy ring within the Circle's interior, marking Connecticut Avenue's entry into the District of Columbia.

In 1938, Francis Griffith Newlands Memorial Fountain, a 60-foot water feature of sandstone and concrete, was erected in the center of the Circle, commemorating Representative and Senator Francis Newlands of Nevada.
