= Khadi Don =

American social media personality and comedian

- Born: April 4, 1996 (age 30); Grand Rapids, Michigan, U.S.
- Occupations: Social media personality; comedian
- Years active: 2013–present

Khadi Don (born April 4, 1996) is an American social media personality, comedian, and actress. Don began posting on the video-sharing platform Vine in 2013, where she soon found viral success with her comedy sketches and parodies, including her 2015 parody of the Eve song "Who's That Girl?". She subsequently became popular on Black Twitter and other social media platforms.

== Life and career ==
Don was born on April 4, 1996 in Grand Rapids, Michigan. She had one younger brother; he was killed in 2021. She first began making videos as a child while grounded in her room with a camera. Don became interested in comedy and making videos professionally after making and filming a parody of R. Kelly's song series "Trapped in the Closet" at age 12. She sold customized shoes and clothing in high school. She studied fine arts in college, where she also competitively played basketball.

Don started posting videos on YouTube and on the now-defunct video-sharing platform Vine in 2013. Her first video to find viral success on the latter platform was a voiceover of an Oprah Winfrey interview with Rihanna posted in late 2013. Her 2015 parody of the Eve song "Who's That Girl?", "Who's That Bitch", brought her further online success. She moved from Grand Rapids to Los Angeles in January 2016. Her self-produced video content, which she posted to Instagram, Facebook, and Twitter and often included references to 1990s R&B and hip hop, became particularly popular on Black Twitter. She starred in Super Deluxe's Thelma & Louise-inspired comedy short film Khadi & Joanne, starring Don as a fictionalized version of herself alongside Branden Miller as his character Joanne the Scammer, in December 2016.

Don was signed to Fullscreen in March 2018. She was featured as a special guest in the YouTube Originals livestream Bear Witness, Take Action, hosted by Keke Palmer and Common, in June 2020.

== Personal life ==
After previously having come out to her friends and family, Don came out as a lesbian in a YouTube video in July 2019.

Don has cited her mother, Dave Chappelle, Eddie Murphy, and Beyoncé as her comedic influences. She has described her comedy as "super sarcastic" and "super witty" with "no filter".
