= Don, West Virginia =

Unincorporated community in West Virginia, United States

- Unincorporated community
- Location within West Virginia Location within the United States
- Coordinates: 37°44′31″N 81°56′20″W
- Country: United States
- State: West Virginia
- County: Logan
- Elevation: 883 ft (269 m)
- Time zone: UTC-5 (Eastern (EST))
  - Summer (DST): UTC-4 (EDT)
- GNIS ID: 1554317

Don is an unincorporated community in Logan County, West Virginia, United States.
