= Don (nickname) =

Don or the Don is the nickname of:

- Don (actor), Bangladeshi actor (born: 1971)
- Don Cheadle (born 1964), an American actor, writer, producer, and director.
- Don Rickles (1926–2017), American stand-up comedian, actor and author
- Don Henley (born 1947), American singer-songwriter, producer, drummer and founding member of the Eagles
- Don Johnson (born 1949), American actor, producer, director, singer, and songwriter
- John Gotti (1940–2002), Italian-American gangster and former boss of the Gambino crime family; known as "The Dapper Don", and also as "The Teflon Don"
- Don Cherry (born 1934), Canadian ice hockey commentator for CBC Television
- Don King (born 1931), American boxing promoter renowned for making historic boxing matchups
- Don Omar (1978), Puerto Rican singer, songwriter and actor
- Don Knotts (1924–2006), American comedic actor, best known as Barney Fife on The Andy Griffith Show
- Don McLean (born 1945), American singer-songwriter best known for the hit song: "American Pie"
- Donald Trump (born 1946), American businessman and 45th & 47th President of the United States of America; affectionately known as "the Don"
- Donald Trump Jr. (born 1977), American businessman and former reality TV personality
- Don Bradman (1908–2001), Australian cricketer also called "the Don" as well
- Don Nelson (born 1940), American former NBA player and head coach
- Don Imus (1940–2019), American radio host, humorist, and landscape photographer
- Don Muraco (born 1949), American retired professional wrestler
- Don Shula (1930–2020), professional American football coach and player
- Don Sutton (1945–2021), American professional baseball player
- Don Drysdale (1936–1993), American professional baseball player and television sports commentator
- Don Meredith (1938–2010), American football quarterback, sports commentator and actor
- Don Sornrabiab (1949–2026), Thai singer and actor
- Don (character), a fictional criminal in an Indian film franchise of the same name, shortened from Mark Donald
