= Donne =

Donne or Donné is a surname, and may refer to:

== People ==
- Alfred François Donné (1801–1878), French bacteriologist and doctor
- Daniel Donne (died 1617), English jurist
- Elena Delle Donne (born 1989), American basketball player
- Gabriel Donne (died 1558), English monk
- Gaven Donne (1914–2010), New Zealand-born judge
- George Donne (1605–1639), English soldier and writer, son of John
- John Donne (1572–1631), English poet and Anglican cleric
- John Donne the Younger (1604–1662), English clergyman and writer, son of John
- Sir John Donne (c. 1420s – 1503), Welsh courtier, diplomat and soldier
- Maria Dalle Donne (1778–1842), Italian physician
- Mark Donne, London-based film-maker and writer
- Raffaele Delle Donne (born 1967 or 1968), Italian-Canadian Mafia associate and informant
- Robert Donne (born 1967), American musician and composer
- Thomas Donne (1860–1945), New Zealand civil servant
- William Bodham Donne (1807–1882), English journalist
- William Donne (cricketer) (1875–1942), English cricket player
- William Donne (priest) (1845–1914), British clergyman

== See also ==
- Don (disambiguation)
- Done (disambiguation)
- Donn (disambiguation)
- Dun (disambiguation)
- Dunn (disambiguation)
- Dunne, a surname
- Donne Trotter (born 1950), American politician
- Donne Wall (born 1967), American basketball player
- Donne (crater), a crater on Mercury
- Donne River, a river in New Zealand
- Donne (song), a 1985 song by Zucchero Fornaciari
