= Don River Bridge, Rannes =

Don River Bridge
- Coordinates: 24°05′44″S 150°07′09″E
- Carries: Leichhardt Highway (Motor vehicles)
- Crosses: Don River
- Locale: Rannes, Queensland, Australia

Characteristics
- Material: Reinforced concrete

History
- Construction start: expected end of 2011
- Construction end: expected mid-2013
- Replaces: Low-level timber bridge

Location
- Interactive map of Don River Bridge

The Don River Bridge is a reinforced concrete road bridge that carries the Leichhardt Highway across the Don River, located near Rannes, Queensland, Australia. The former low-level timber bridge was prone to flooding.

Three new concrete bridges are planned on a new and improved alignment of a 13 kilometres (8.1 mi) section of the Leichhardt Highway over the Don River, Windmill Creek, and Log Creek as part of the A$65 million Don River Bridges Project. When completed the higher bridges will improve flood immunity of this rural highway.

Construction of the new bridges is expected to start by the end of 2011 and be completed in mid-2013.

== See also ==
- Don River Bridge, Bowen
