= Jacqueline Donny =

French model (1927–2021)

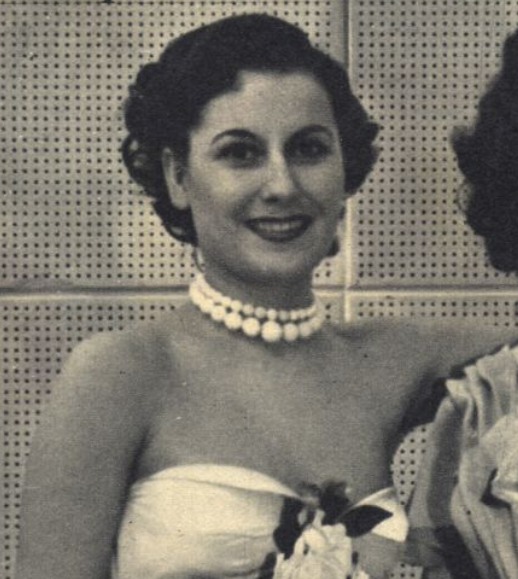
- Jacqueline Donny in Cinévie of March 9, 1948.
- Born: 2 August 1927; France
- Died: 14 February 2021 (aged 93); Fontenay-sous-Bois, France
- Occupation: Model

Jacqueline Donny (2 August 1927 – 14 February 2021) was a French model and beauty pageant contestant.

== Career ==
After being awarded Miss Paris in 1947, she was runner up to that year's Miss France, Yvonne Viseux. The next year, she became the 18th Miss France, and was crowned Miss Europe 1948.
