= Doer =

Doer may refer to:

- Gary Doer (born 1948), a Canadian politician
- DOER Marine, a marine technology company

== See also ==
- Dör, a village in Győr-Moson-Sopron county, Hungary
- Doe (disambiguation)
