= Friendship Heights =

- Neighborhood
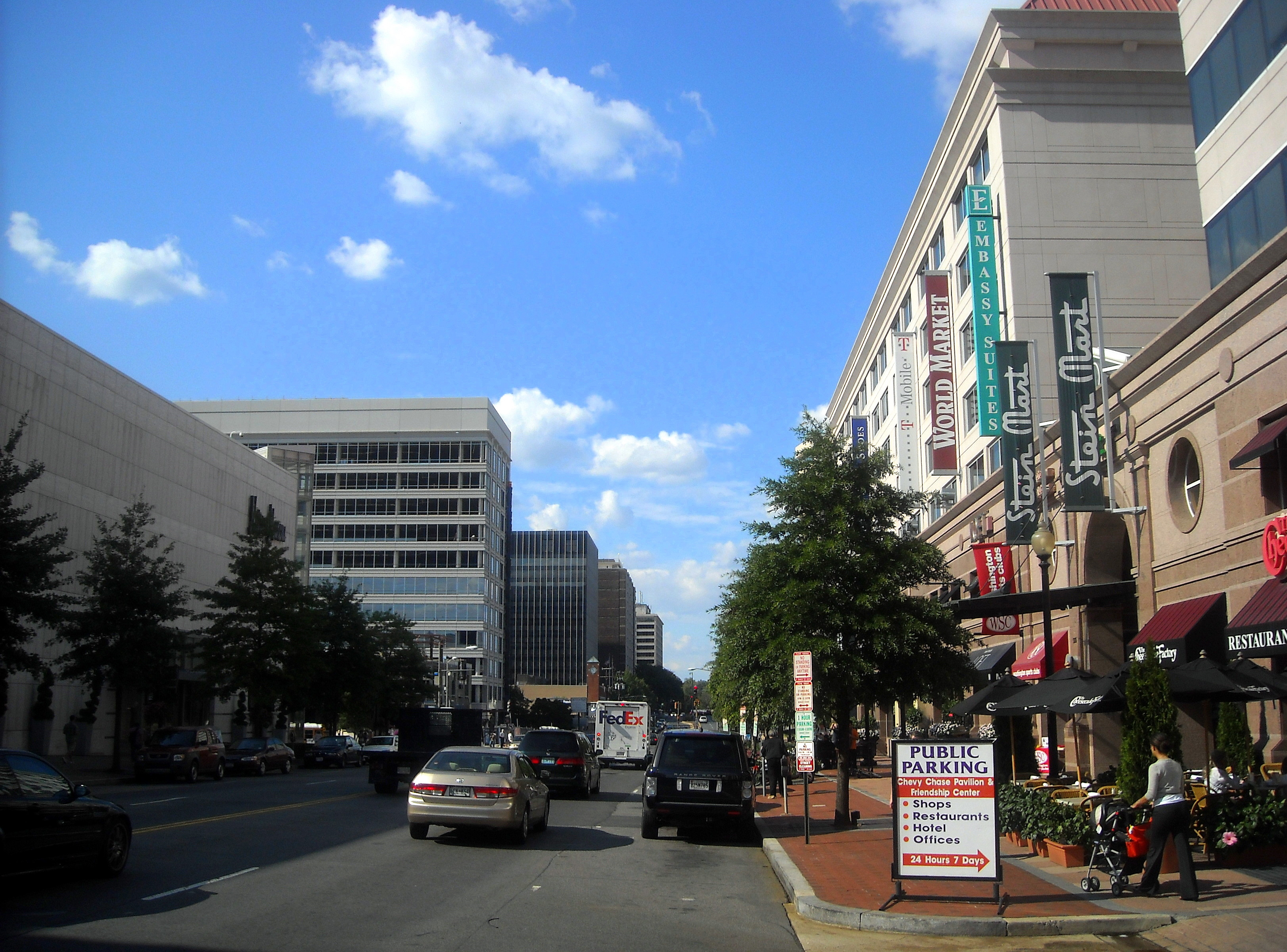
- Facing north on Wisconsin Avenue in Friendship Heights

- Map of Washington, D.C., with Friendship Heights highlighted in red
- Coordinates: 38.957°N 77.083778°W
- Country: United States
- District: Washington, D.C.
- Ward: Ward 3

Government
  - Councilmember: Matthew Frumin
- Postal code: ZIP code

Friendship Heights is an urban commercial and residential neighborhood in northwest Washington, D.C., and southern Montgomery County, Maryland. Though its borders are not clearly defined, Friendship Heights consists roughly of the neighborhoods and commercial areas around Wisconsin Avenue north of Fessenden Street NW and Tenleytown to Somerset Terrace and Willard Avenue in Maryland, and from River Road in the west to Reno Road and 41st Street in the east. Within Maryland west of Wisconsin Avenue is the Village of Friendship Heights, technically a special taxation district.

The portion in the District of Columbia lies in Ward 3, represented by ANCs 3E03 and 3E04. It is often considered to be part of Chevy Chase, D.C.; The most substantial commercial aspects are the shopping plazas near the intersection of Wisconsin and Western Avenues. Found here are many department stores, as well as numerous boutiques, day spas, a multiplex cinema and other services which cater to the residents as well as visitors to the area. The area also features a variety of moderate and discount chains.

The neighborhood also supports a number of offices, including the corporate headquarters of insurance giant GEICO (originally Government Employees Insurance Company) and the Ritz-Carlton hotel chain, and a concentration of broadcast media including the studios of WMAL-FM and WTOP-FM. As a result, heavy traffic is not uncommon.

The Friendship Heights Station on the Red Line of the Washington Metro system serves the area, and the station is also a major connecting depot for area bus services. Streetcar service, which once connected the neighborhood to Georgetown, was abandoned in 1960.

Since the late 1990s, development has accelerated in the neighborhood, notably the construction of Chase Tower on Willard Avenue, a new Chevy Chase Center replacing the older 1980s-era complex of the same name, and new condominiums on the site of the former Washington Women's Clinic.

== Retail ==
For decades, a six-block stretch of Wisconsin Avenue in Friendship Heights and Chevy Chase has been the only place partially or wholly in Washington, D.C., with multiple traditional department stores. At its height, the strip was home to Bloomingdale's, Saks Fifth Avenue, Lord & Taylor and Neiman Marcus. The latter two closed in 2020, as did the indoor shopping center at the Chevy Chase Pavilion. As of 2026, two department stores remain, both on the Maryland side: a freestanding Saks Fifth Avenue and a Bloomingdale's in a multiuse center that also includes a Whole Foods Market, boutiques, and residential and office space.

Along the D.C. stretch of Wisconsin Avenue are:

- Mazza Gallerie, home to Neiman Marcus from November 1977 until 2020; T.J. Maxx and all other remaining tenants closed on December 24, 2022. Tishman Speyer acquired the property in May 2021 for $52 million with plans to redevelop it into 350 apartments and 26,000 square feet (2,400 m^{2}) of retail space. The mall was razed by 2024; a new building is being constructed for mixed-use development.
- Friendship Center, formerly home to big-box discounter Marshalls. Maggiano's Little Italy remains. Cheesecake Factory closed on December 5, 2025.
- Chevy Chase Metro Center, with big-box craft retailer Michaels
- Chevy Chase Pavilion, whose shopping center with anchors Cost Plus World Market and Old Navy closed in 2020. As of 2024, an Embassy Suites hotel and office building remain.

On the Maryland stretch are:

- Wisconsin Place, home to Bloomingdale's, Whole Foods Market, other shops and restaurants
- The Collection at Chevy Chase, an upscale outdoor shopping center that includes a Tiffany & Co. store.
- Saks Fifth Avenue, freestanding department store
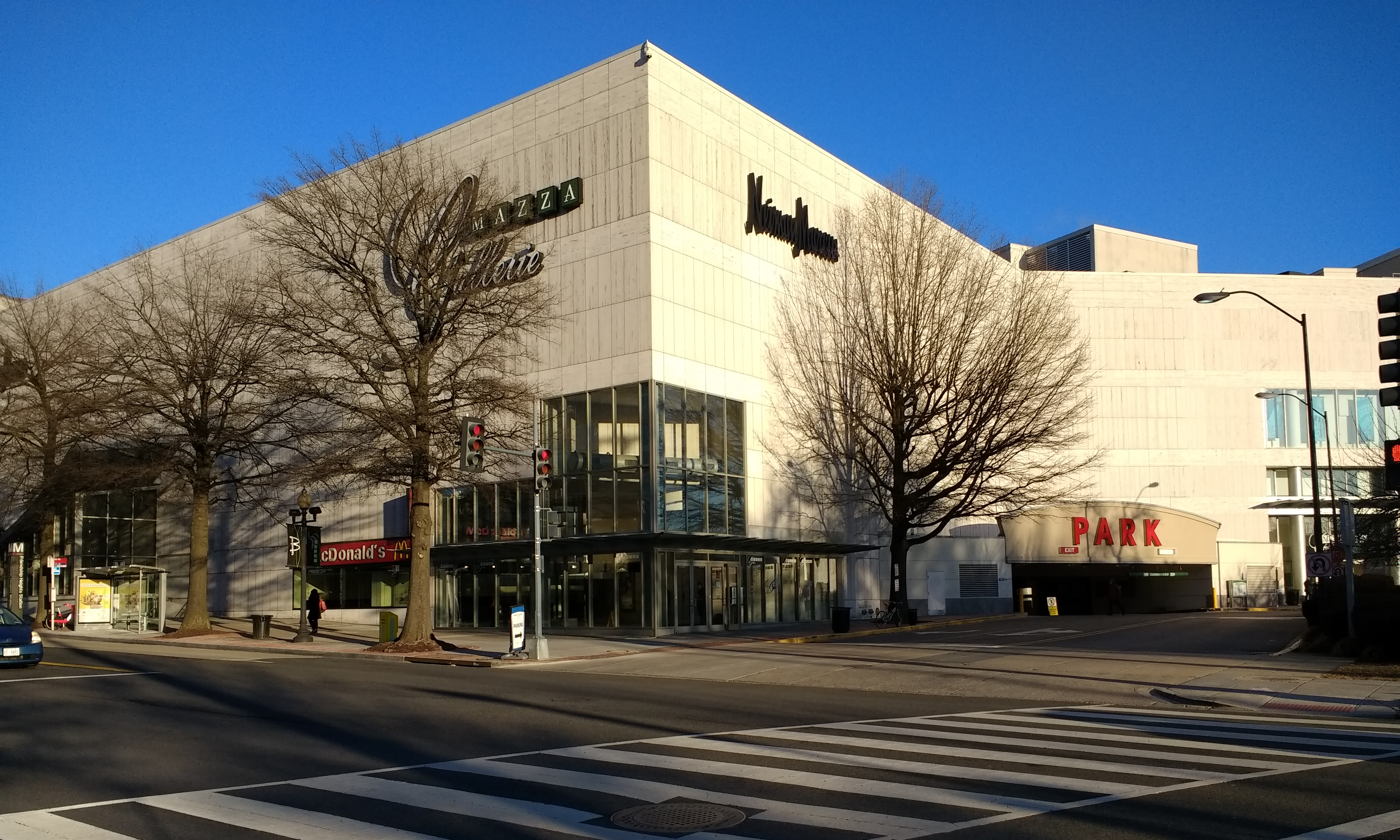
Neiman Marcus at Mazza Gallerie, opened 1977, closed 2020

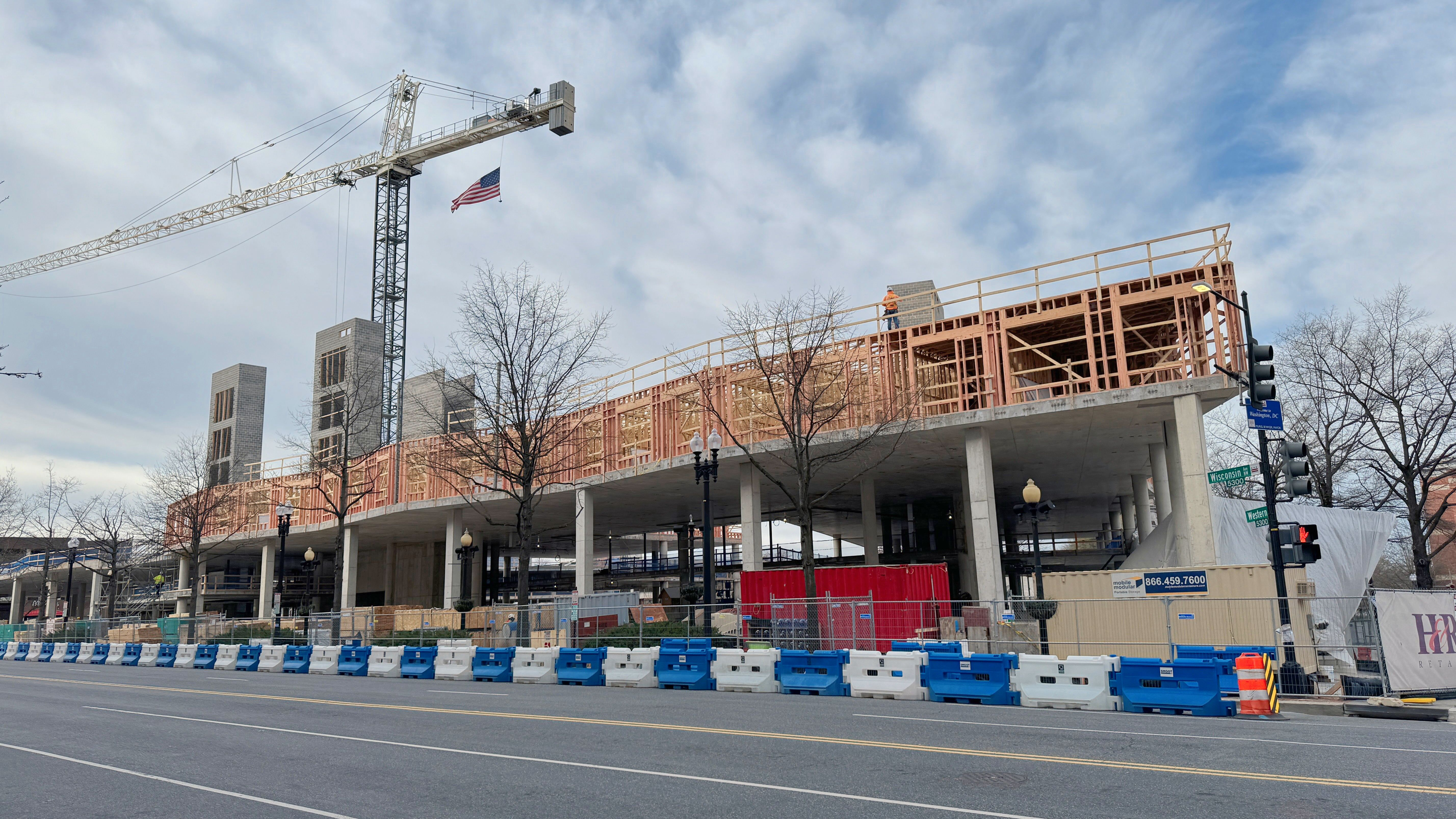
Mazza Gallerie: old building razed, new building under construction, March 2024

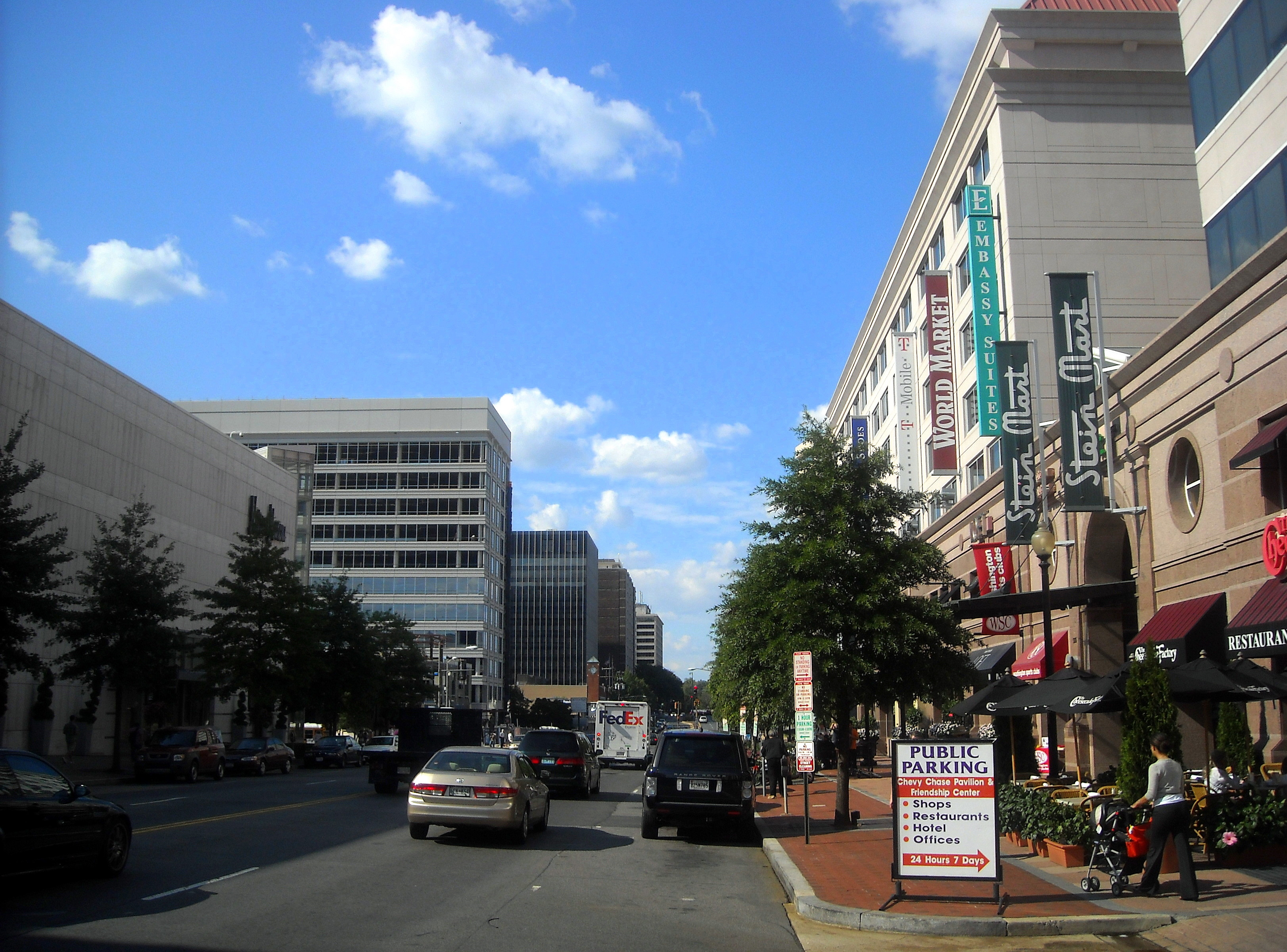
Chevy Chase Pavilion (right) and Neiman Marcus (left), 2008.

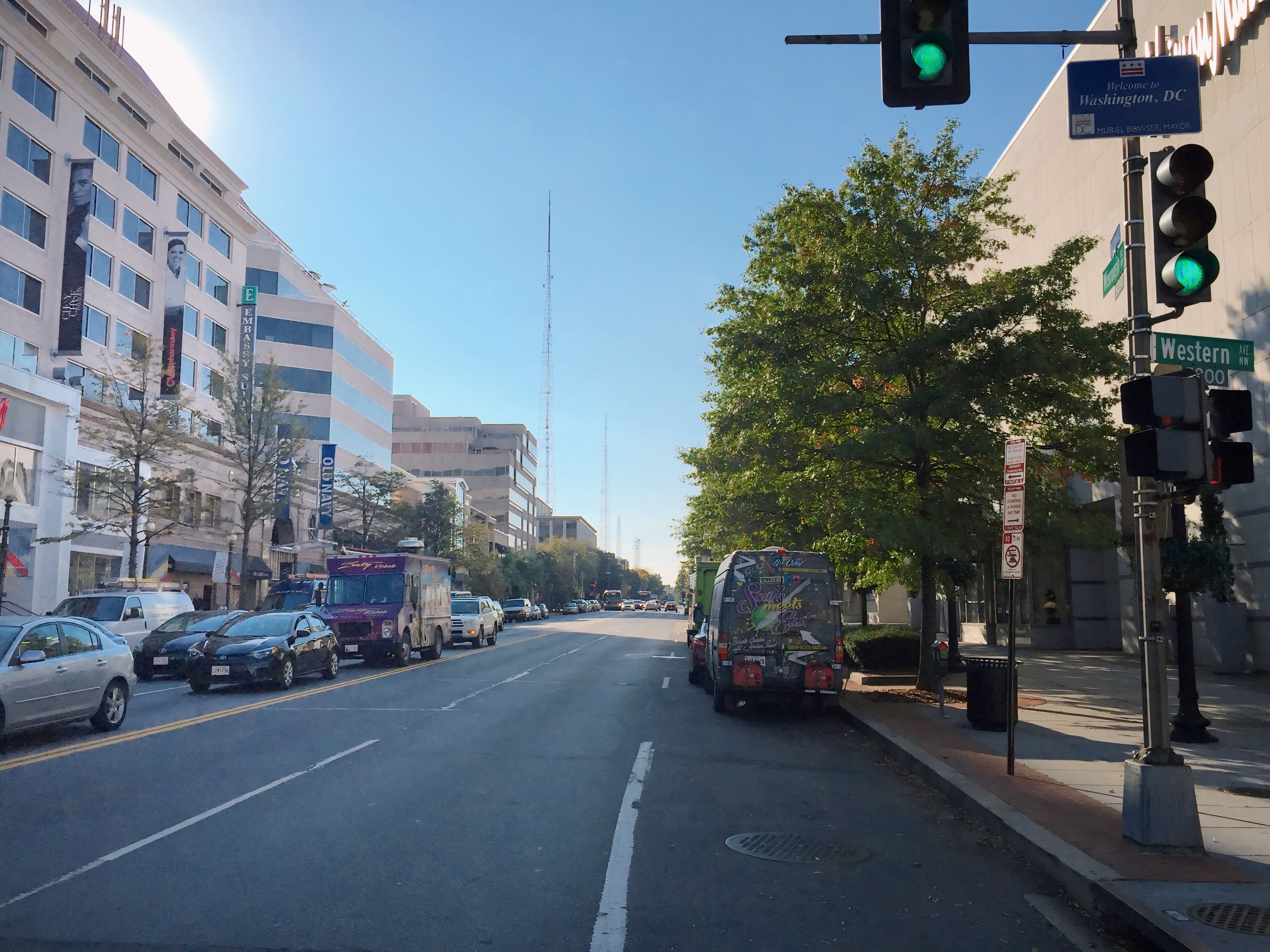
Chevy Chase Pavilion (left) and Neiman Marcus (right), 2016

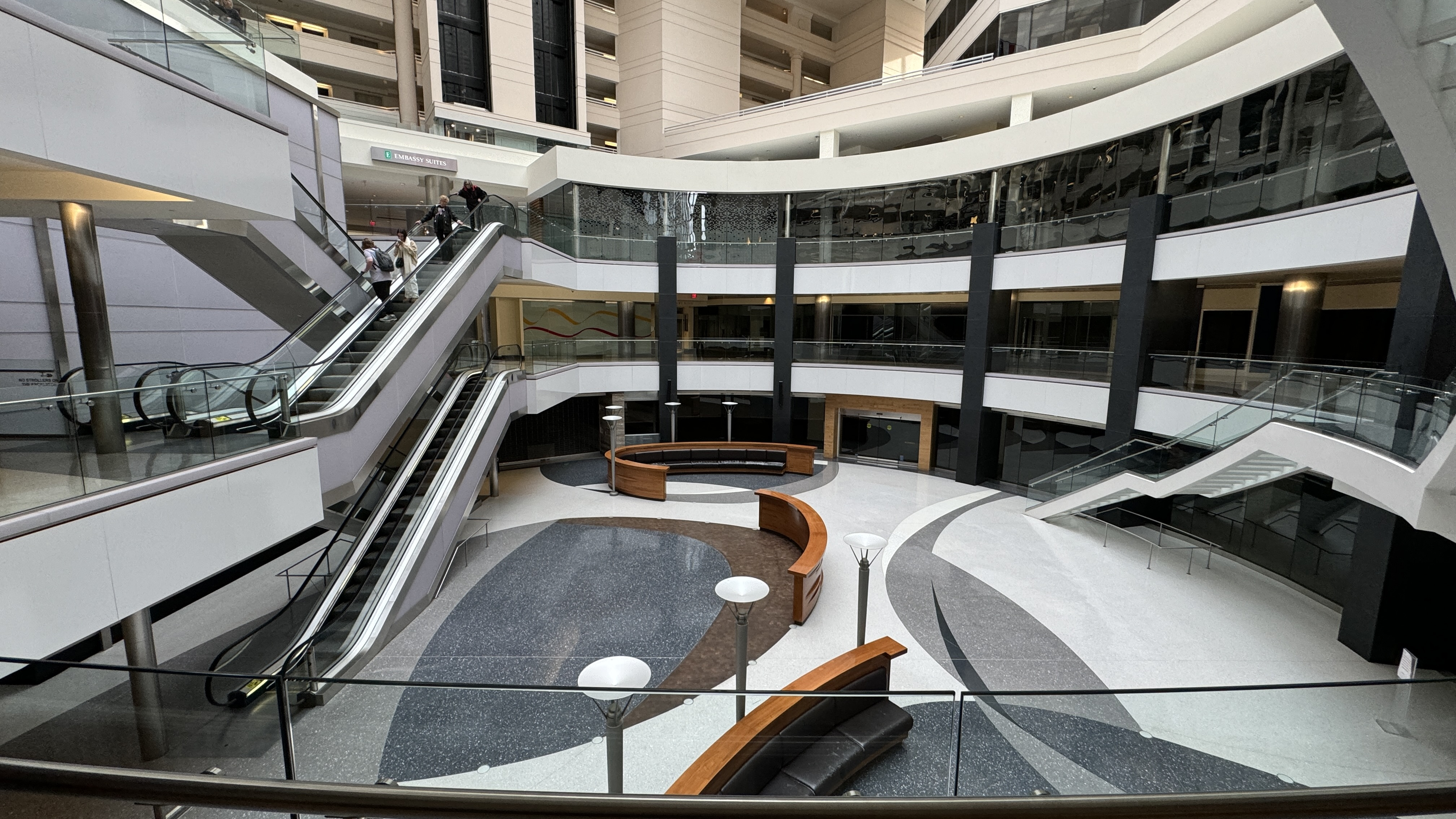
Chevy Chase Pavilion, empty retail and dining area, March 2024

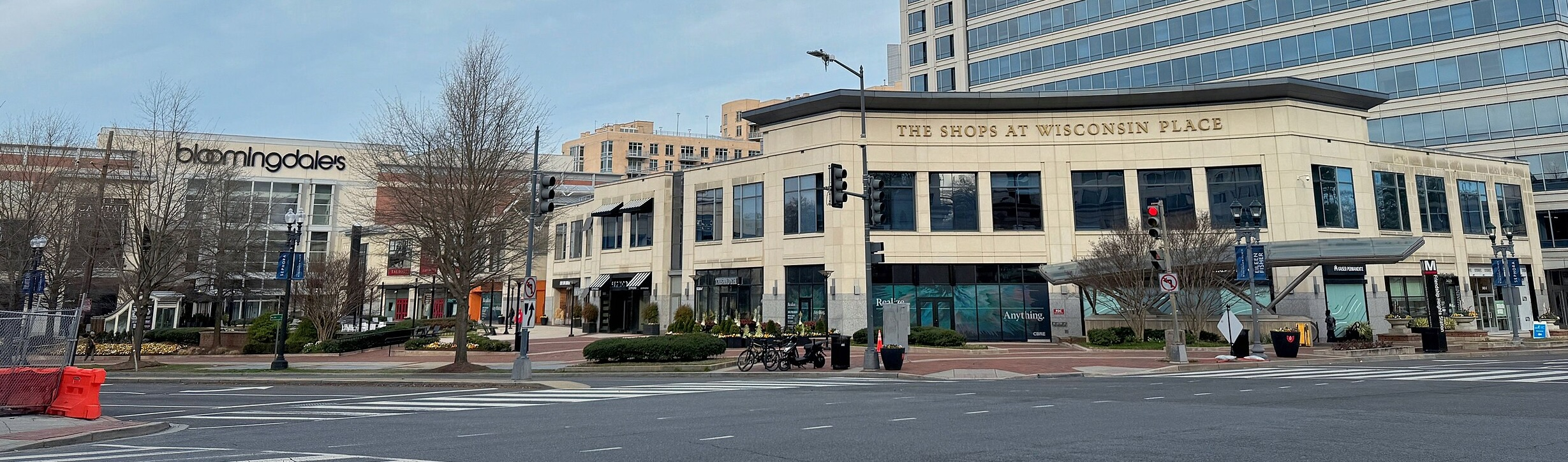
The Shops at Wisconsin Place, March 2024

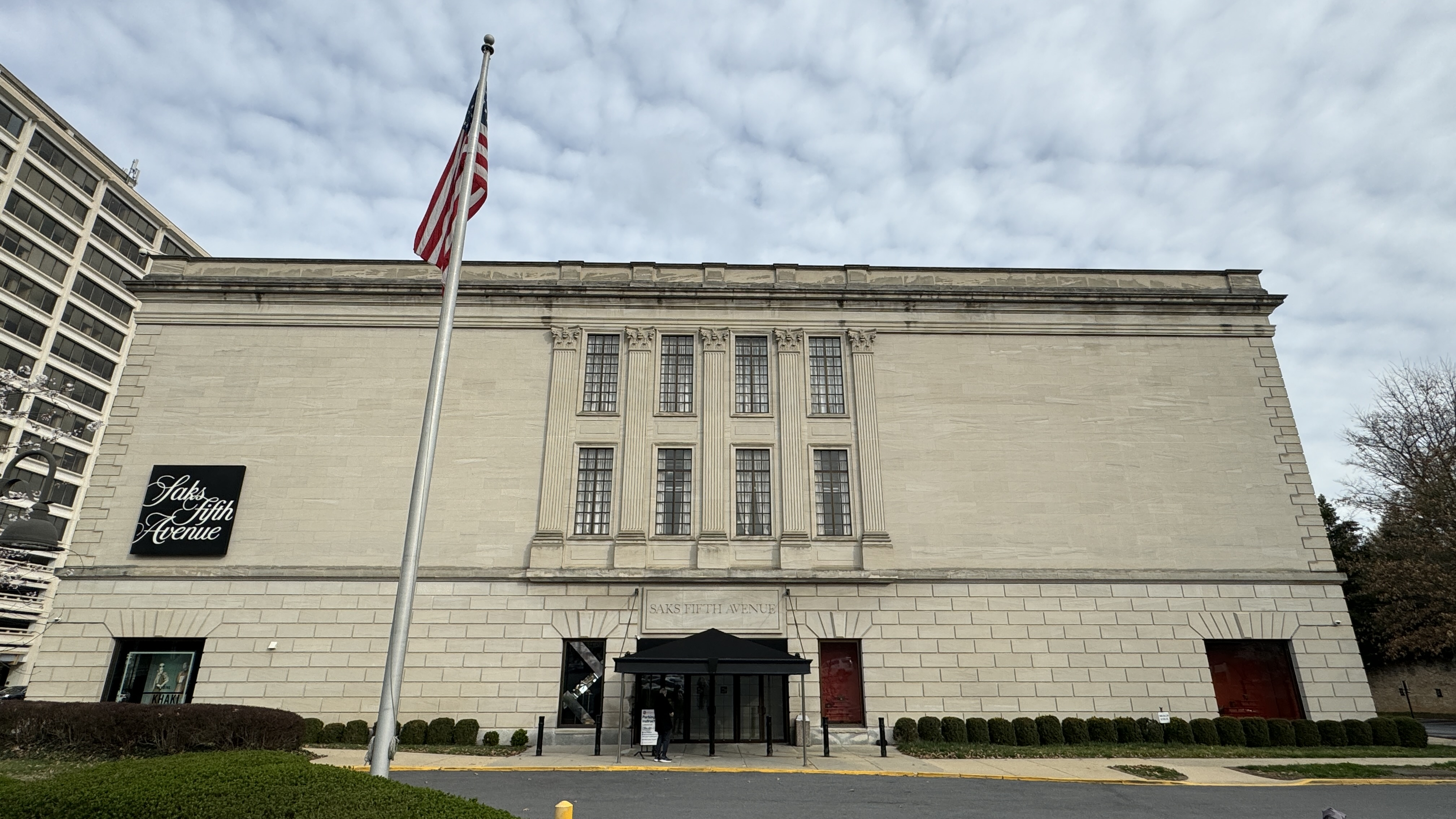
Saks Fifth Avenue

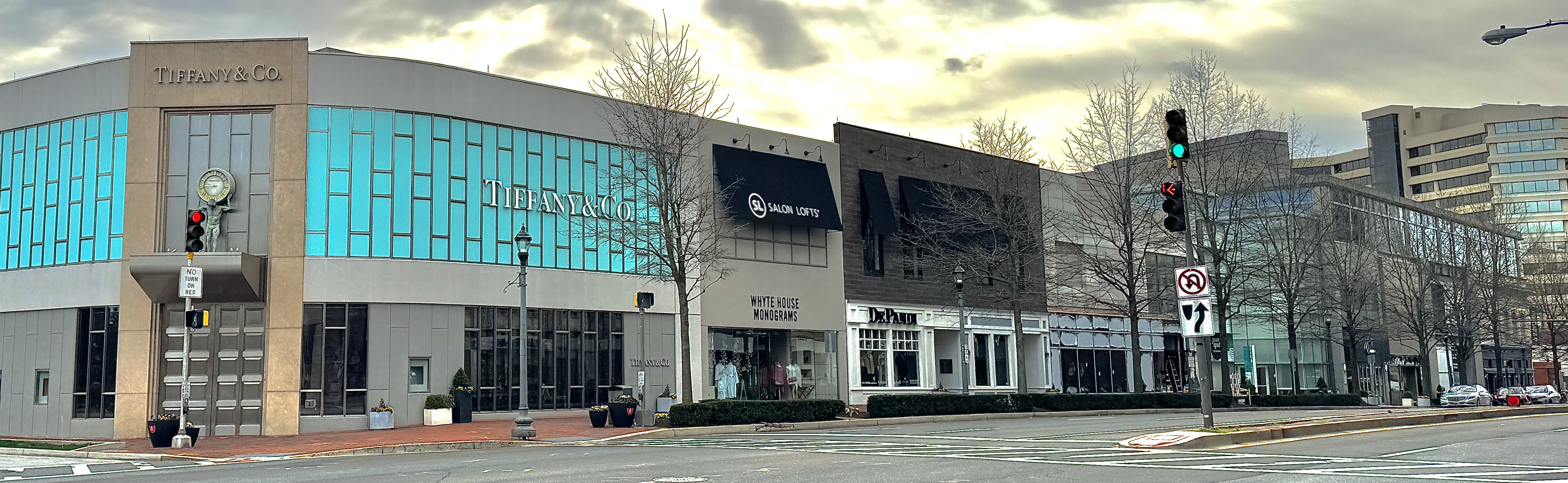
The Collection at Chevy Chase, panorama of Wisconsin Avenue streetfront

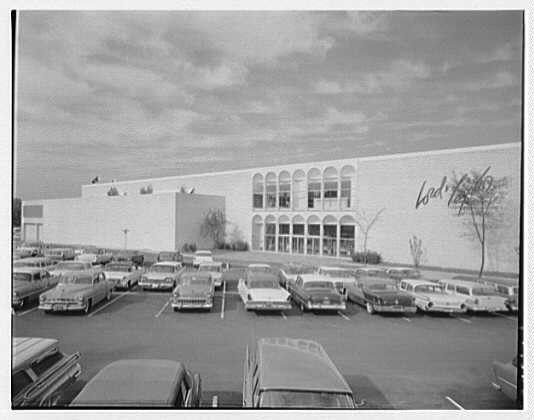
Lord & Taylor department store at opening in 1959 (closed 2020)

== Education ==
District of Columbia Public Schools operates public schools. Friendship Heights is served by Janney Elementary School, Lafayette Elementary School, Alice Deal Middle School, and Jackson-Reed High School.

The Maryland side of Friendship Heights is served by Somerset Elementary School, Westland Middle School, and Bethesda Chevy Chase High School.

District of Columbia Public Library operates the Tenley-Friendship Library. After seven years in an interim location, the library reopened in 2011 at the corner of Wisconsin Avenue and Albemarle Streets.

== See also ==
- List of upscale shopping districts
