= Don River (disambiguation) =

The Don River is a river in Russia and the fifth-longest river in Europe.

Don River or River Don may also refer to:

== Australia ==
- Don River (Central Queensland), a tributary of the Fitzroy River
- Don River (North Queensland)
- Don River (Tasmania)
- Don River (Victoria)

== Canada ==
- Don River (Ontario)

== France ==
- Don (Vilaine), a river in Brittany

== United Kingdom ==
- River Don, Lancashire, England
- River Don, Tyne and Wear, England
- River Don, Yorkshire, England
  - Little Don River, a tributary
  - River Don Navigation, the lower River Don
- Duke of Northumberland's River or D.O.N. River
- River Don, Aberdeenshire, Scotland

== See also ==
- Don (disambiguation)
- Don River Bridge (disambiguation)
- Don Rivers, American politician
