= Klingle Valley Bridge =

- U.S. National Register of Historic Places
- U.S. Historic district – Contributing property
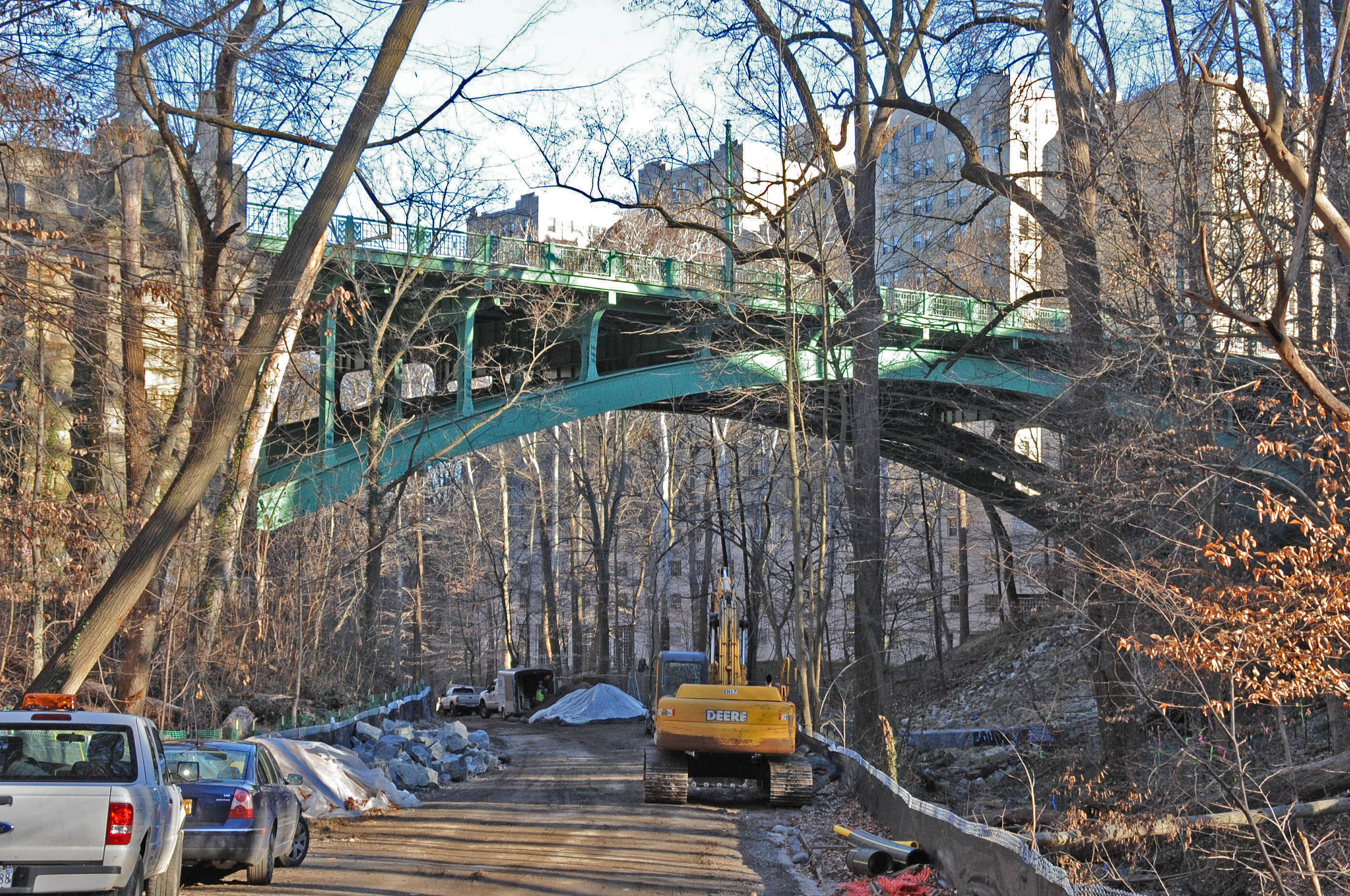
- Connecticut Avenue Bridge from Klingle Road

- Location within Washington, D.C.
- Location: Washington, D.C.
- Coordinates: 38°55′56″N 77°3′24″W
- Built: 1932
- Architect: Paul Philippe Cret; Ralph Modjeski
- Architectural style: Art Deco
- Part of: Cleveland Park Historic District (ID87000628)
- NRHP reference No.: 04000448

Significant dates
- Added to NRHP: May 21, 2004
- Designated CP: April 27, 1987

The Klingle Valley Bridge, officially known as the Connecticut Avenue Bridge, is an Art Deco steel-arch bridge located near the National Zoological Park on Connecticut Avenue, Northwest in Washington, D.C. Built in 1931–1932, the bridge crosses Klingle Valley, running from Macomb Street to Devonshire Place and connecting the Cleveland Park and Woodley Park neighborhoods. There is no direct connection between Connecticut Avenue and Klingle Valley Trail in the narrow valley below.

The bridge replaced an earlier one built around 1890 by real estate developer and sitting U.S. Representative Francis Newlands, D-Nevada, as part of his effort to create the streetcar suburb of Chevy Chase, Maryland. The original bridge carried pedestrians; horses; the streetcars of the Rock Creek Railway and its successor, the Capital Traction Company; and eventually, automobiles.

The new bridge was designed by architect Paul Philippe Cret and engineer Ralph Modjeski. It was built with sidewalks, roadways, and streetcar tracks, though the latter would operate for just two years before Capital Traction replaced streetcar service on the line with buses.

The bridge features two historic lights on each corner. From 2005 to 2008, the bridge was restored and rehabilitated in a project that restored ornamental lanterns, refurbished masonry, and added street lights.

On May 21, 2004, the bridge was added to the National Register of Historic Places. It is a contributing property to the Cleveland Park Historic District.

== See also ==
- List of bridges documented by the Historic American Engineering Record in Washington, D.C.
- List of bridges on the National Register of Historic Places in Washington, D.C.
- National Register of Historic Places listings in the District of Columbia
