= Francis G. Newlands =

American politician (1846–1917)

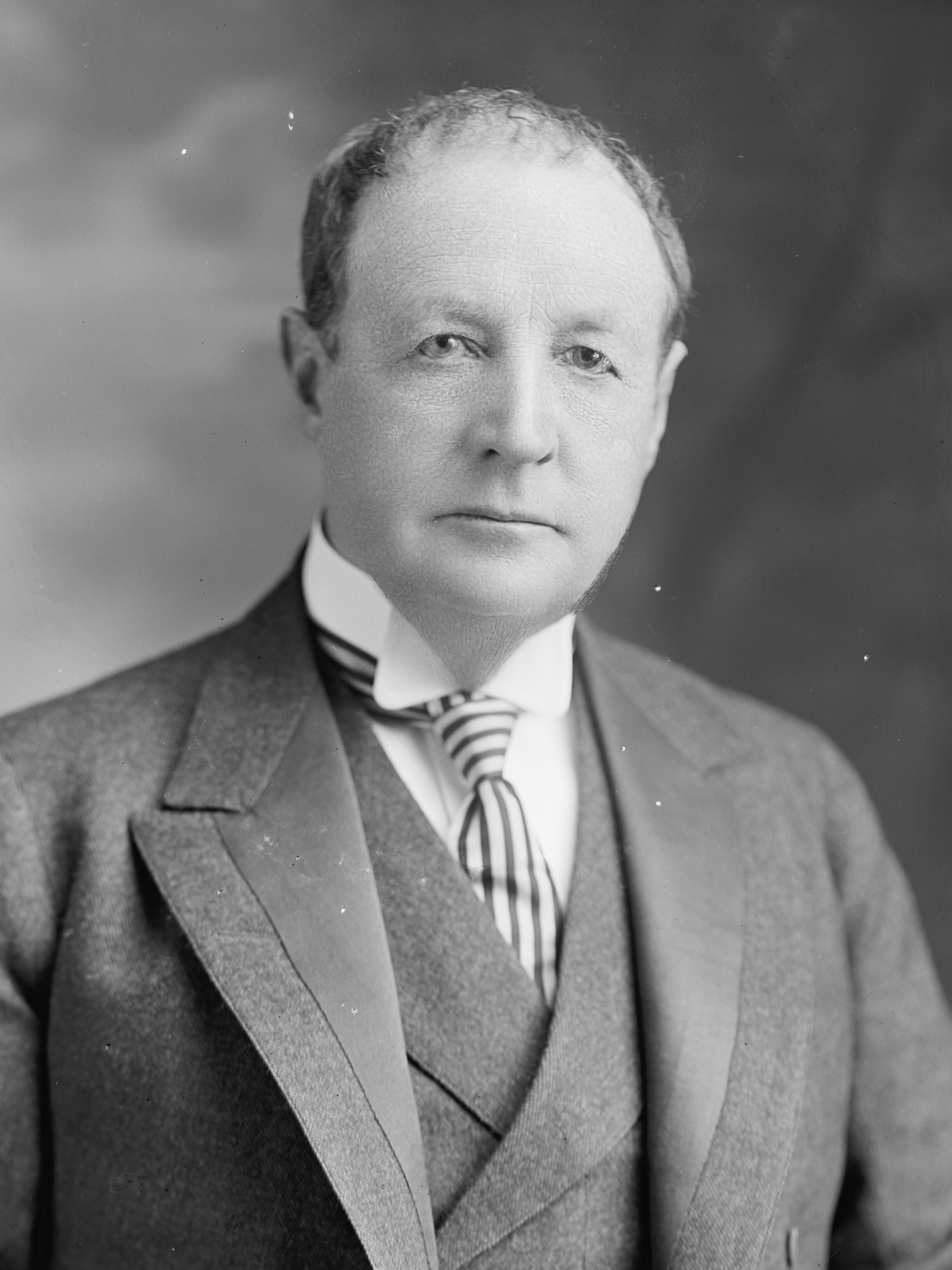
- Newlands, 1905–1917

United States Senator from Nevada
- In office March 4, 1903 – December 24, 1917
- Preceded by: John P. Jones
- Succeeded by: Charles B. Henderson

Member of the U.S. House of Representatives from Nevada's At-Large district
- In office March 4, 1893 – March 3, 1903
- Preceded by: Horace F. Bartine
- Succeeded by: Clarence D. Van Duzer

Personal details
- Born: Francis Griffith Newlands; August 28, 1846 Natchez, Mississippi, U.S.
- Died: December 24, 1917 (aged 71) Washington, D.C., U.S.
- Resting place: Oak Hill Cemetery; Washington, D.C., U.S.
- Party: Silver (1893–1903); Democratic (1903–1917)
- Spouses: Clara Adelaide Sharon (m. 1874; died 1882) Edith McCallister (m. 1888)
- Children: 3
- Profession: Attorney, real estate developer, politician

Francis Griffith Newlands (August 28, 1846 – December 24, 1917) was an American politician and land developer who served as United States representative and senator from Nevada and a member of the Democratic Party.

A supporter of westward expansion, he helped pass the Newlands Reclamation Act of 1902, which created the Bureau of Reclamation and boosted the agricultural industry by building dams to support irrigation in the arid Western states. Newlands was an avowed white supremacist. As such, he argued publicly for racial restrictions on immigration and repealing the 15th Amendment.

As land developer, Newlands founded the neighborhoods of Chevy Chase, Washington, D.C.; and Chevy Chase, Maryland, and took steps to prevent non-white people from moving there. To enable the development of these streetcar suburbs, he founded the Rock Creek Railway, which became one of the two major streetcar companies serving the Washington, D.C., area in the early decades of the 20th century.

== Early life ==
Newlands was born in Natchez, Mississippi, on August 28, 1846 (or 1848; sources differ). He was the fourth of five children born to Jessie and James Newlands, immigrants from Scotland. His father, trained as a physician in Edinburgh, died in 1851. Newlands was raised in Illinois and Washington, D.C.

In 1867, he went to Yale University but left after his first year. In 1869, he graduated from Columbian College, which is now George Washington University Law School, and was admitted to the bar in 1869. In 1901, he received an honorary M.A. degree.

== Career ==
In 1870, Newlands moved to San Francisco, California. He married Clara Adelaide Sharon, the daughter of future Nevada senator William Sharon, in 1874. They had three daughters. Newlands helped William Sharon to reopen the Bank of California, and supervised the management of the Palace Hotel, San Francisco. When Newlands' wife died, he inherited the Sharon estate. Newlands married Edith McAllister and moved to Nevada in 1888.

=== Land developer ===
In the late 1880s, Newlands and his partners began to acquire farmland in northwestern Washington, D.C., and southern Montgomery County, Maryland, to develop a streetcar suburb for the nation's capital. On June 23, 1888, Newlands chartered the Rock Creek Railway for a single-track streetcar. Two years later, Newlands and his partners formed the Chevy Chase Land Company to develop their land, which by then totaled more than 1,700 acres. Between 1890 and 1892, the Land Company built a five-mile extension of Connecticut Avenue from Rock Creek past the District line and into Maryland. The new road included two bridges and a pair of streetcar tracks laid down the center. The Rock Creek Railway opened in 1892. To power the streetcars, the company dammed Coquelin Run, a small tributary of Rock Creek, just east of Connecticut Avenue; the resulting Chevy Chase Lake supplied water for an electric generating plant.

Newlands' development companies attached covenants to lots in Chevy Chase, D.C.; Chevy Chase, Maryland; and later Burlingame, California. These covenants did not explicitly forbid their sale to people of specific races or religions. Instead, they forbade buyers to build homes that cost less than certain amounts — e.g., $3,000 and $5,000 — effectively preventing their sale to members of minority populations with less access to wealth.

Newlands created the Chevy Chase Springs Hotel (later the Chevy Chase School for Girls, now the 4-H Youth Conference Center). Newlands ensured the community included schools, churches, country clubs, tree-lined streets, a water supply and a sewage system. Groceries and daily purchases were brought from Washington, D.C., on the railway at no charge to residents. From 1894 to 1936, the Land Company operated an amusement park on the lake as a means to draw prospective buyers to the development and to keep the streetcars supplied with evening and weekend passengers.

In 1893, Newlands began to subdivide some property he inherited in Burlingame, California. He started with the Burlingame Country Club and five cottages. The following year, he added the Burlingame train station.

=== U.S. Representative ===
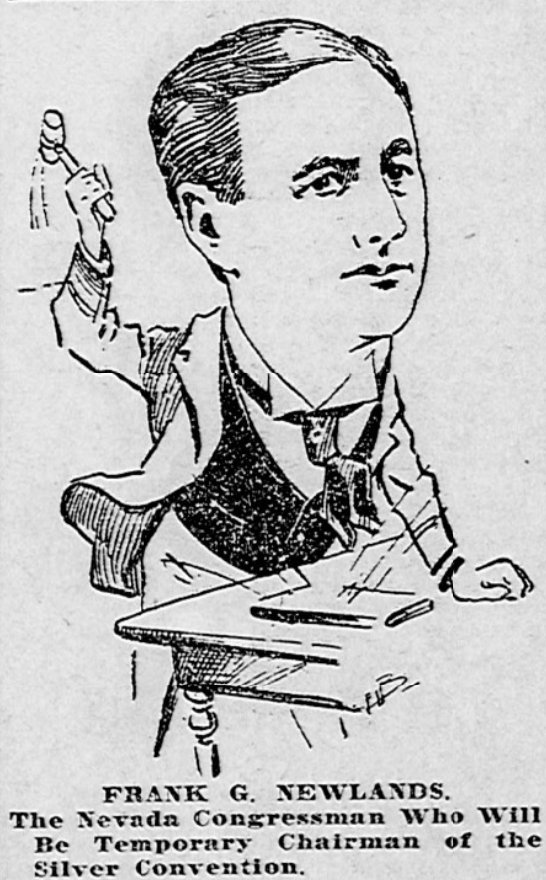
Frank G Newlands caricature, 1896

Newlands represented Nevada in the United States House of Representatives from 1893 to 1903 as a member of the Silver Party. In 1898, he created the Newlands Resolution, which annexed the Republic of Hawaii, creating a new territory. He supported a greater federal role in conservation and pushed for federal funding of western arid land irrigation projects. He helped pass the Reclamation Act of 1902, also called the Newlands Act, which created what would become the Bureau of Reclamation.

=== U.S. Senator ===
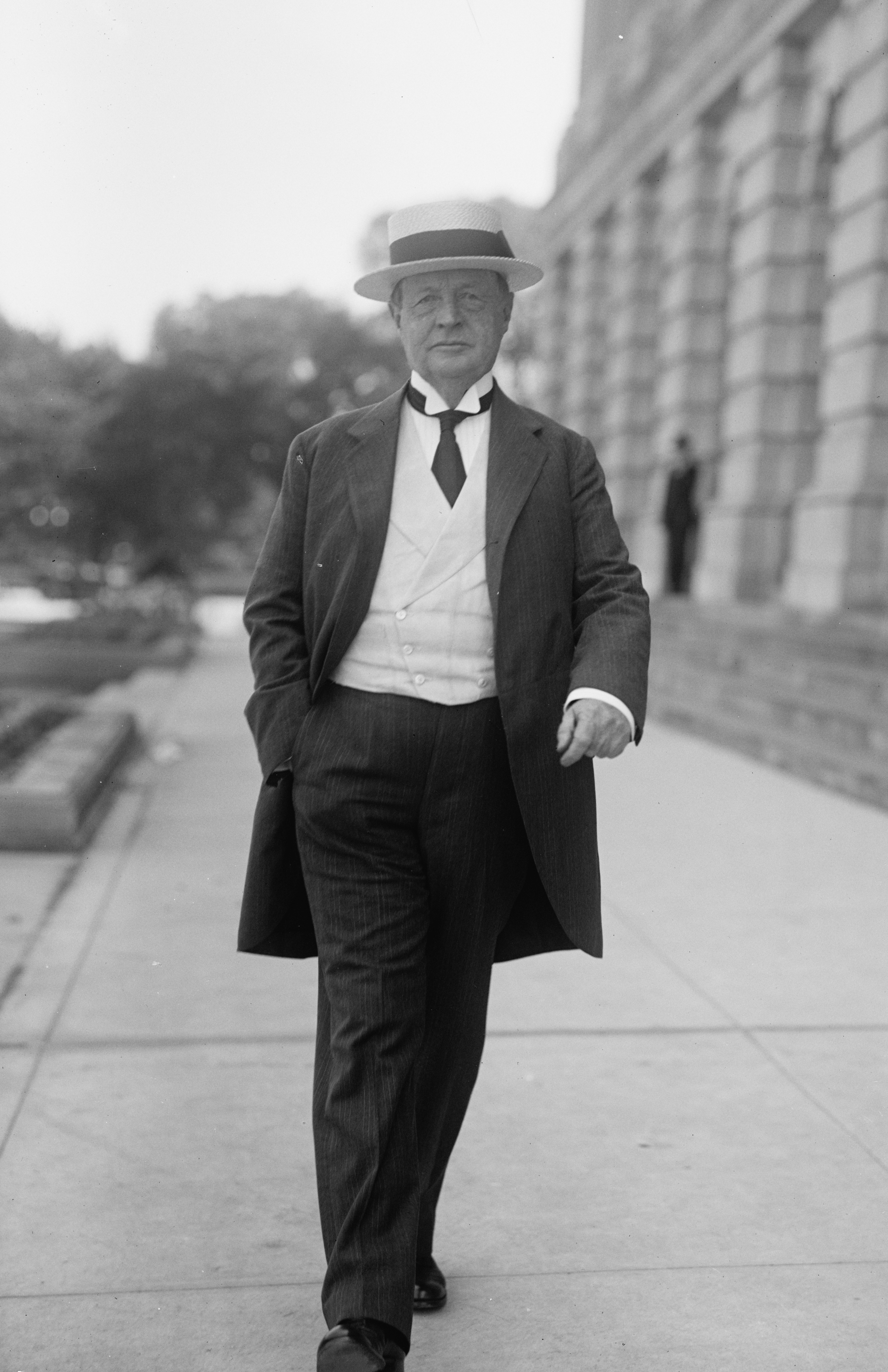
Newlands as a U.S. senator, c. 1914

Newlands entered the United States Senate in 1903 as a Democrat. He supported the protection of the National Forests under the United States Forest Service in 1905, and the creation of the National Park Service in 1916.

He was a member of the Senate subcommittee that investigated the 1912 sinking of RMS Titanic. He took part in the first 10 of the inquest's 18 days, focusing particularly on the paucity of lifeboats aboard the ship. The proceedings are regarded as among the most important Senate investigations of the 20th century, and its findings led to reforms in safety practices and maritime policy.

In 1916, Newlands was the only Democratic senator to vote against the nomination of Louis Brandeis to the U.S. Supreme Court.

Newlands held white supremacist beliefs and spoke publicly in favor of restricting the rights of African Americans.

== Racial views ==
Newlands was an outspoken white supremacist who advocated for those beliefs as a senator, and a white nationalist who sought to secure the United States as a homeland for whites. In 1905, he advocated for the paid resettlement of African Americans to the Caribbean. In a 1909 journal article, "A Western View of the Race Question" published in the Annals of the American Academy of Political and Social Science, Newlands wrote that Black people were "a race of children" who threatened the United States. The country, he wrote, "should start immediately upon the serious consideration of a national policy regarding the people of the black race now within our boundaries, which, with a proper regard for humanity, will minimize the danger which they constitute to our institutions and our civilizations." He also expressed fear that people from Asia would take over the West Coast: "Asia, with nearly a billion people of the yellow and brown races, who, if there were no restrictions, would quickly settle upon and take possession of our entire western coast and intermountain region." He distinguished between Chinese and Japanese people using stereotypes: "the Chinese, who are patient and submissive, would not create as many complications as the presence of the Japanese, whose strong and virile qualities would constitute an additional element of difficulty."

In a June 17, 1912, article in the New York Times, Newlands wrote, "I believe this should be a white man's country and that we should frankly express our determination that it shall be." At the 1912 Democratic National Convention, he proposed that the party's platform include a "White Plank" calling for the repeal of the Fifteenth Amendment to the United States Constitution and the restriction of immigration to whites.

== Death and legacy ==
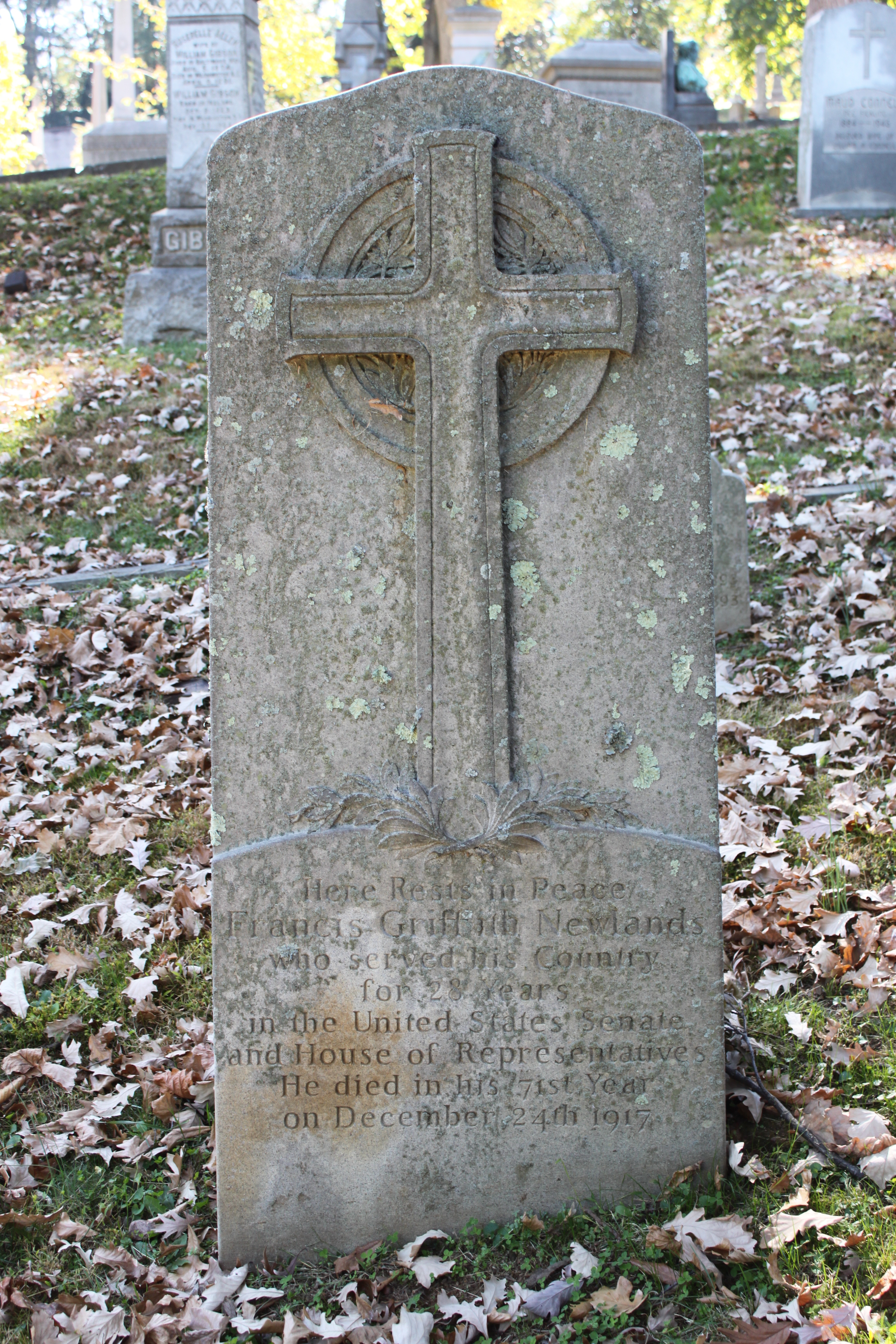
Grave of Newlands at Oak Hill Cemetery

Newlands was stricken with heart failure at his Senate office on the afternoon of December 24, 1917, and died that night at his home at 2236 Massachusetts Avenue NW. He was interred at Oak Hill Cemetery in Washington, D.C.

In 1943, a Liberty ship was commissioned Francis G. Newlands; it was scrapped in 1965.

The Francis Griffith Newlands Memorial Fountain is in Chevy Chase Circle, a federal park that divides D.C. and Maryland. In 2014, a member of the Chevy Chase advisory neighborhood commission proposed a resolution calling for the removal of Newlands' name from the fountain because of his white supremacist views on race, including his desire to remove the vote for African Americans. Others argued that Chevy Chase should not alter the monument because the change would belittle Newlands' legislative accomplishments.

On July 27, 2020, the Advisory Neighborhood Commission of Chevy Chase, D.C., voted unanimously to ask the National Park Service to remove the plaque bearing his name from the Francis Griffith Newlands Memorial Fountain and create an exhibit documenting Newlands's racism.

A similar renaming effort has begun around Newlands Park in Reno, Nevada.

Newlands' former mansion in Reno is one of six properties in Nevada designated as a National Historic Landmark. Many notable people, including Barbara Hutton in 1935, stayed at the house while waiting for their divorce paperwork to be finalized by George Thatcher, a local divorce lawyer who purchased the home in 1920.

== Portrayals ==
- Randy Kovitz, in the 2024 movie Unsinkable

== See also ==
- National Irrigation Congress
- List of members of the United States Congress who died in office (1900–1949)

Party political offices
New office	Democratic nominee for U.S. Senator from Nevada (Class 3); 1914	Succeeded by Charles Henderson
U.S. House of Representatives
Preceded by Horace F. Bartine	Member of the U.S. House of Representatives from Nevada's at-large congressional district 1893–1903	Succeeded by Clarence D. Van Duzer
U.S. Senate
Preceded by John P. Jones	U.S. senator (Class 3) from Nevada; 1903–1917; Served alongside: William M. Stewart, George S. Nixon, William A. Massey, Key Pittman	Succeeded by Charles B. Henderson
Political offices
Preceded by Moses E. Clapp; Minnesota	Chairman of the United States Senate Committee on Interstate Commerce; 1913–1917	Succeeded by Ellison D. Smith; South Carolina
