= CCLC (company) =

American real estate company

- Formerly: The Chevy Chase Land Company
- Company type: Investment and asset management
- Industry: Commercial real estate
- Founded: 1890
- Founder: Francis G. Newlands, Major George Ames
- Headquarters: Chevy Chase, Maryland, United States
- Area served: Washington metropolitan area
- Owner: Privately held
- Number of employees: 10
- Website: cclcre.com

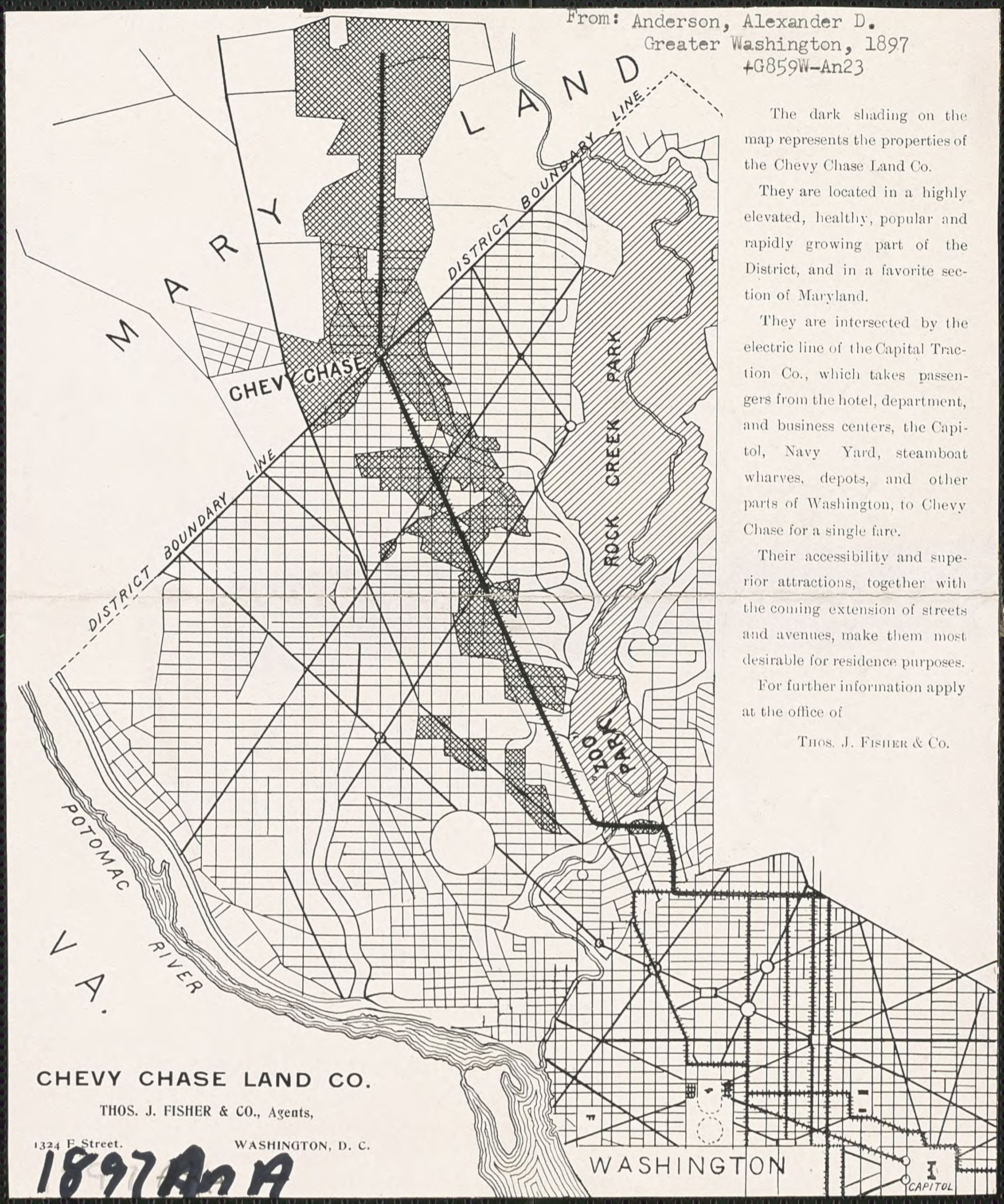
An 1897 map showing property owned by the Chevy Chase Land Company along with Connecticut Avenue and the Rock Creek Railway streetcar line, both created by the company and its owners. Many of the streets depicted in Northwest D.C. did not yet exist.

CCLC is a commercial real estate asset management firm based in suburban Washington, D.C. As of 2025, it manages more than 1.6 million square feet of office, mixed-use, residential, and retail space, mostly in Montgomery County, Maryland.

It was founded as the Chevy Chase Land Company in 1890 by Francis G. Newlands and William M. Stewart, who sought to develop streetcar suburbs for well-off white people in what is today the Chevy Chase area of Maryland and Washington, D.C. The company, which disavowed racist practices in the 2020s and renamed itself in 2025, continues to operate today as a privately held firm.

== History ==
=== 19th century ===
Around 1886 or 1887, Newlands launched an all-but-unprecedented effort to create a major streetcar suburb of Washington, D.C. His funding came from the inheritance of his deceased wife, a daughter of wealthy banker William Sharon; he also attracted other investors, including Nevada politicians known as the "California Syndicate". Newlands directed the quiet purchase of land along a straight line from just north of Dupont Circle, which was at the time the northwestern edge of urban development, into an unincorporated area of Maryland's Montgomery County and up to today's Jones Bridge Road. Newlands initially intended this line to run to the established town of Rockville, Maryland, but found it easier and cheaper to buy Montgomery County land about a half-mile to the east.

Among the parcels was "Oak View" in present-day Cleveland Park, the 26.5-acre country estate of Grover Cleveland, who had recently completed his first term as U.S. president. Newlands paid $140,000 for the land in February 1890, just four years after Cleveland had purchased it for $21,500.

On June 6, 1890, when his group of straw purchasers had accumulated 1,712 acres (6.93 km^{2}), Newlands incorporated a company to bring the parcels together for development: the Chevy Chase Land Company (formally, The Chevy Chase Land Company of Montgomery County, Maryland.) That year, The Washington Star newspaper called it the "most notable transaction that has ever been known in the history of suburban property." Newlands' partners were Albert W. Louisa, of Baltimore; William. R. Schaeft, of Hyattsville; and Edward I. Stellwagen, of Washington.

In the meantime, Newlands and his partners were building a streetcar line to connect their remote landholdings to the city center. In 1888, they had acquired majority control of the Rock Creek Railway, which had obtained a charter to build one of D.C.'s first electric streetcar lines but lacked the funds for construction. Newlands and his partners funded the grading and construction of the road and streetcar right-of-way that would become Connecticut Avenue north of Rock Creek; the thoroughfare north of the District line was built by their Chevy Chase Land Company.

Streetcar operations began in 1890 on two blocks of Florida Avenue NW east of Connecticut. The company ultimately spent about $1.5 million($53,750,000 today) to build a five-mile line from 18th and U Streets NW to Coquelin Run in Maryland. A key link was the first bridge across the deep valley of Rock Creek at Calvert Street NW. Erected by the Edgemore Bridge Company in 1891 at a cost of $70,000 ($2,508,333 today), it stretched 755 feet across six wrought-iron trusses on iron trestles that were 125 feet high. The company then conveyed the bridge to the municipal government of Washington, D.C., which took up half the cost of maintaining the structure. When the bridge began to fail in 1911, its deck—a 40-foot-wide roadway flanked by five-foot walkways—was narrowed. (The bridge would be replaced in 1933–35 by the current Duke Ellington Bridge.)

In shaping the Chevy Chase neighborhoods, the company pioneered efforts to provide various services to the growing areas. The Society for Architectural Historians writes, "A major reason for the success of this pioneering suburban community was the fact that The Chevy Chase Land Company included civil, sanitary, and structural engineers as well as architects, landscape architects, and real estate agents to incorporate zoning, architectural design guidelines, landscaping, and infrastructure...The company also constructed water and sewer systems and an electrical power house." That "power house" held the hydroelectric generator that drove the Connecticut Avenue streetcars; the company had also built the manmade lake—Chevy Chase Lake—that drove the generator, and later became the centerpiece of an eponymous amusement park with boating, swimming, and other activities.

These services did not include shops, stores, or commerce in general, which were banned from the area; company leaders instead provided "freight service" on the Connecticut Avenue streetcar line by which groceries and other household goods might be delivered.

An avowed white supremacist, Newlands took steps to keep African Americans out of the new neighborhoods. Though the Chevy Chase Land Company only began attaching racial covenants to its houses several decades later, it initially set its prices for houses at points that effectively limited sales to well-off whites: $5,000 ($158,800 today) and up on Connecticut Avenue and $3,000 and up on side streets.

"Newlands and his partners further maintained control through a system of interlocking corporations run by the same people. If someone wanted to buy a lot in a Chevy Chase subdivision, they'd have to go through the Thomas Fisher brokerage, controlled by Newlands' deputy, Edward Stellwagen. The brokerage would screen buyers, sell property, insurance, and provide mortgage financing. Later, the partners would add Union Trust Bank to manage outside investments."

In 1894, the company built the Chevy Chase Inn on Connecticut Avenue; the property would become Chevy Chase Junior College from 1903 until 1950, then the national youth center for the National 4-H Foundation through 2021; as of July 2025, it is to be redeveloped as senior living.

=== 20th century ===
In November 1901, the Chevy Chase Land Company sold $25,000 ($750,500 today) worth of land on the west side of Connecticut Avenue NW at today's Van Ness Street NW. The buyer was the National Bureau of Standards—specifically, Dr. Samuel W. Stratton, the federal agency's first director—which was moving from its first home on Capitol Hill. The Bureau would turn the old Vineyard and Springland Farm into one of the country's most sophisticated scientific laboratory complexes: a 70-acre, 90-building campus.

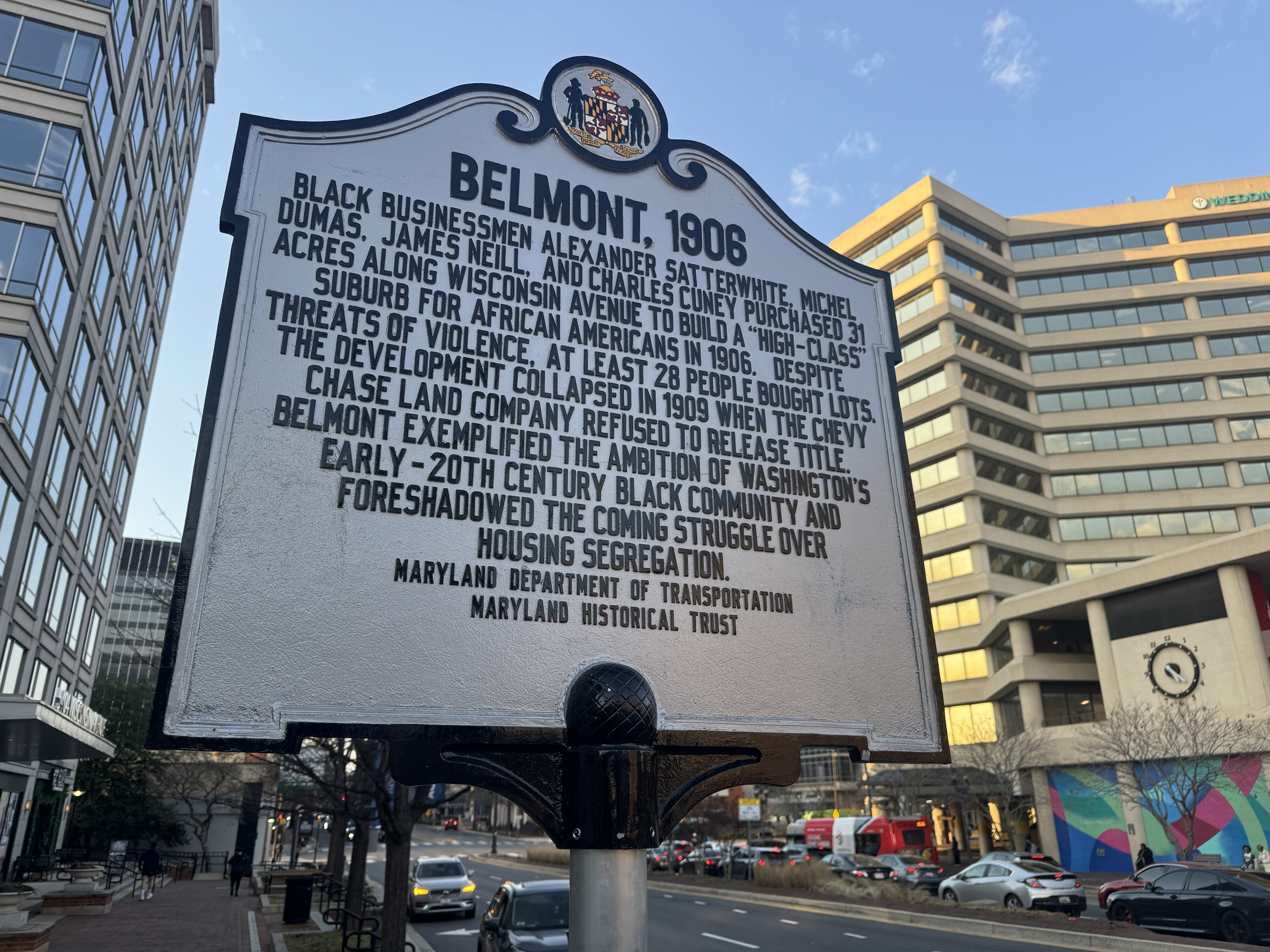
A historical marker, erected in 2024, commemorates the 1906 attempt to establish Belmont and its thwarting by the Chevy Chase Land Company. The sign stands in Friendship Heights Village, across the street from the former Belmont parcel. Visible at right is the 2 Wisconsin Place office building, built on the parcel and still owned by the company.

In 1906, Newlands' company helped block the creation of Belmont, a subdivision intended to be a neighborhood created by African American developers and populated by African American homebuyers. In 1927, the company would successfully petition to have the subdivision erased from the Montgomery County property books.

In 1913, the company provided the land for Montgomery County's first public school. The parcel sat northeast of Rosemary Circle in what is today the Town of Chevy Chase. Residents raised $5,000 to buy and erect four portable frame buildings as temporary classrooms for first- through 10th-grade students. In 1917, this Chevy Chase School opened its first permanent building, a two-story Art Deco-inspired brick structure; it would eventually become Chevy Chase Elementary School.

Newlands ran the company until his death in 1917. One year previously, a sales brochure alluded to steps taken to keep Chevy Chase white: "The only restrictions imposed are those which experience has proven are necessary in any residential section to maintain or increase values and protect property holders against the encroachment of undesirable elements."

Newlands was succeeded by Edward J. Stellwagen. In 1925, the company built the Chevy Chase Arcade in Northwest D.C.; it was planned as "one of four business centers alternating with apartments along Connecticut Avenue."

In 1932, Edward Hillyer became company president. Under Hillyer, The Chevy Chase Land Company inserted covenants into land purchases barring their sale to Black or Jewish people. The racial "restrictions waned during World War II and were barred entirely by the Supreme Court in 1948, but the legacy of discrimination lingers," a historian wrote in 2016; Chevy Chase Village, for example, was 95.9% White at the 2015 census.

Under Stellwagen and Hillyer, the company mostly just sold off pieces of land. That would change after World War II, when it began to more actively develop buildings.

In 1946, William S. Farr became company president. Born in 1903, Farr was both a grand-nephew and grandson-in-law of Newlands.

Farr was followed in 1972 by Hunter Davidson. In 1979, the Chevy Chase Land Company announced plans to build a 12-story office building immediately north of the intersection of Wisconsin Avenue and Western Avenue, on the southern tip of the former Belmont parcel. The wedge-shaped plot, still owned by the company, had been occupied by a Howard Johnson's motel since at least 1942. The building was constructed along with and above the Friendship Heights station of the Washington Metro's Red Line, under a deal that allowed the Washington Metropolitan Area Transit Authority to add its station without the expense of purchasing land. Originally called the Chevy Chase Metro Building, it is today known as 2 Wisconsin Avenue.

In 1981, Davidson handed the reins to Farr's son, Gavin M. Farr (b. 1942).

In 1988, the company sold a 22.5-acre tract at Connecticut Avenue and Jones Bridge Road to the Howard Hughes Medical Institute. As part of the sales agreement, the company "retained the rights for architectural approvals in order to be sure that Chevy Chase's architectural integrity is maintained," a company official said.

=== 21st century ===
Completed in 2023 by CCLC and Bozzuto Group, the Chevy Chase Lake mixed-use development is named for a trolley park opened nearby in 1894. The streetcar sculpture is by artist Tom Fruin.

Ed Asher was CEO in 2006, when the company's holdings totaled 2 million square feet.

In 2008, David Smith, a great-great-grandson of Newlands, became the company's president and CEO. He was abruptly ousted in August 2014; company officials declined to say why. At the time, the company owned some 1.5 million square feet of commercial real estate, mostly office space and retail properties in or around Bethesda and Chevy Chase.

Smith was replaced as interim CEO by board leader Kate Carr, and then by Tom Regnell, who had been an executive at Washington Real Estate Investment Trust. In July 2020, Regnell was replaced as president and CEO by John L. Ziegenhein III, a Baltimore native who previously worked in commercial real estate banking and for developer McCaffery Interests.

In June 2020, in the wake of the murder of George Floyd, company officials released a statement that said, "The Chevy Chase Land Company of today stands for the ideals of diversity and inclusion", that "to truly move forward, we must acknowledge our past and come together to build an inclusive community", and that "Our Board of Directors recognizes that despite Senator Newlands' accomplishments, his views on race contradict the ideals of our company fabric." In the statement, officials said they would support the renaming of the Newlands fountain at Chevy Chase Circle.

In 2024, the Maryland Historical Trust installed a historic marker commemorating the Belmont affair across the street from the parcel, which is still owned by Chevy Chase Land Company. Ziegenhein said that the company believes "in the importance of transparency regarding the actions taken at Belmont. More importantly, we must ensure those actions are never repeated."

The company says that it has over the years donated to and otherwise supported more than 500 local schools, small businesses, environmental conservation programs, and initiatives promoting social equity; its website says the company also organizes four days of service each year, during which employees collectively volunteer over 200 hours to community organizations.

In September 2025, the Chevy Chase Land Company renamed itself CCLC. A press release said the change reflects the company's growth into a "commercial real estate investment and asset management firm".

== Properties ==
Name	Type	Size (ft^{2})	Location	Notes
2 Bethesda Metro	Office (Class A)	315,527	Bethesda, Maryland	Redevelopment of the Year (2025), CoStar Group Impact Awards Award of Excellence in Construction (2024), ABC of Metro Washington & Virginia
2 Wisconsin Circle	Office (Class A), medical	235,000	Chevy Chase, Maryland	Outstanding Achievement in Recycling – Business (2015) Montgomery County, Maryland Recycling Achievement Recognition
5425 Wisconsin Avenue	Office	210,000	Chevy Chase, Maryland	Class A office
8401 Connecticut Avenue	Office	173,107	Chevy Chase, Maryland	Medical
The Collection	Mixed-use	144,044	Chevy Chase, Maryland	Restaurants, shops, offices. Includes CCLC's main office, which received a Merit award in Interior Architecture (2005), American Institute of Architects DC Chapter Design Awards: Maryland American Society of Landscape Architects Honor Award (General Design) (2021), ASLA Awards; Best Revamp of Shopping Area (2020) Best of Bethesda, Bethesda Magazine; Best Real Estate Deals – Retail Deals (2005), Best Real Estate Deals of 2005, Washington Business Journal
South Lakes Village	Retail	109,527	Reston, Virginia	Supermarket, restaurants, shops
Chevy Chase Lake	Mixed-use	93,453 (retail)	Chevy Chase, Maryland	Residential & retail; joint venture with Bozzuto Group. Includes: The Barrett at Chevy Chase Lake: 6-story, 280-unit building with street retail; The Claude at Chevy Chase Lake: 13-story, 186-unit building with street retail; Awards: Silver Award Honors for Mixed-Use Community, Multifamily (2024), National Association of Home Builders Best in American Living; Award of Excellence for Best Multifamily Property (2024), NAIOP DC | MD Awards of Excellence; Excellence in Construction, Diamond Winner (2024), Associated Builders and Contractors Greater Baltimore; Awards of Excellence The Best of Architecture 2022 – Vertical Mixed Use (Retail and Residential) (2022) Mid Atlantic Real Estate Journal; Lennard Award for Excellence in Architectural Design (2022), 58th International Making Cities Livable Conference, Paris, France; Best Washington/Baltimore Mid-Rise Apartment Community (2022), Delta Associates 26th Annual Multifamily Awards
Lake West Shopping Center	Retail	28,497	Chevy Chase, Maryland	Part of a 16-acre mixed-use plan along Connecticut Avenue
5301 Marinelli Road	Office	14,000	Rockville, Maryland	Long-term lease to St. Coletta of Greater Washington
Northampton	Retail	9,993	Washington, D.C.	
672 Flats	Residential		Ballston, Virginia	6-story, 173-unit building; acquired for $90 million in 2018
