= Rock Creek Railway =

Streetcar company in Washington, D.C.

Overview
- Parent company: The Chevy Chase Land Company
- Founders: Francis Newlands
- Dates of operation: 1890–1895
- Successor: Capital Traction Company

Technical
- Track gauge: 4 ft 8 1/2 in (1,435 mm) standard gauge
- Electrification: Yes
- Length: 7-plus miles

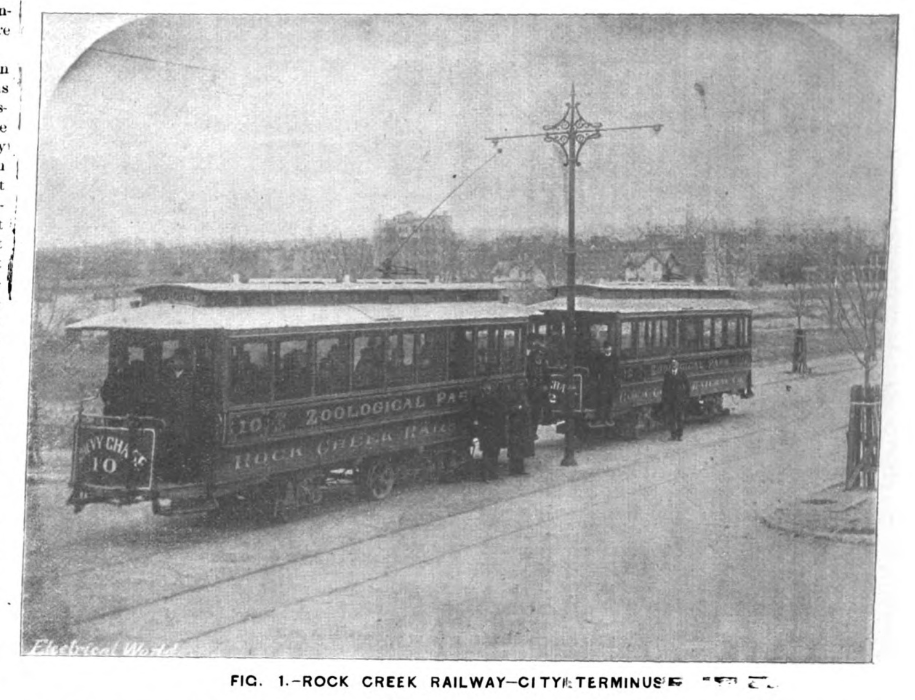
Two Rock Creek Railway electric streetcars sit at 18th and U Streets, the line's original Washington, D.C. terminus, in 1893.

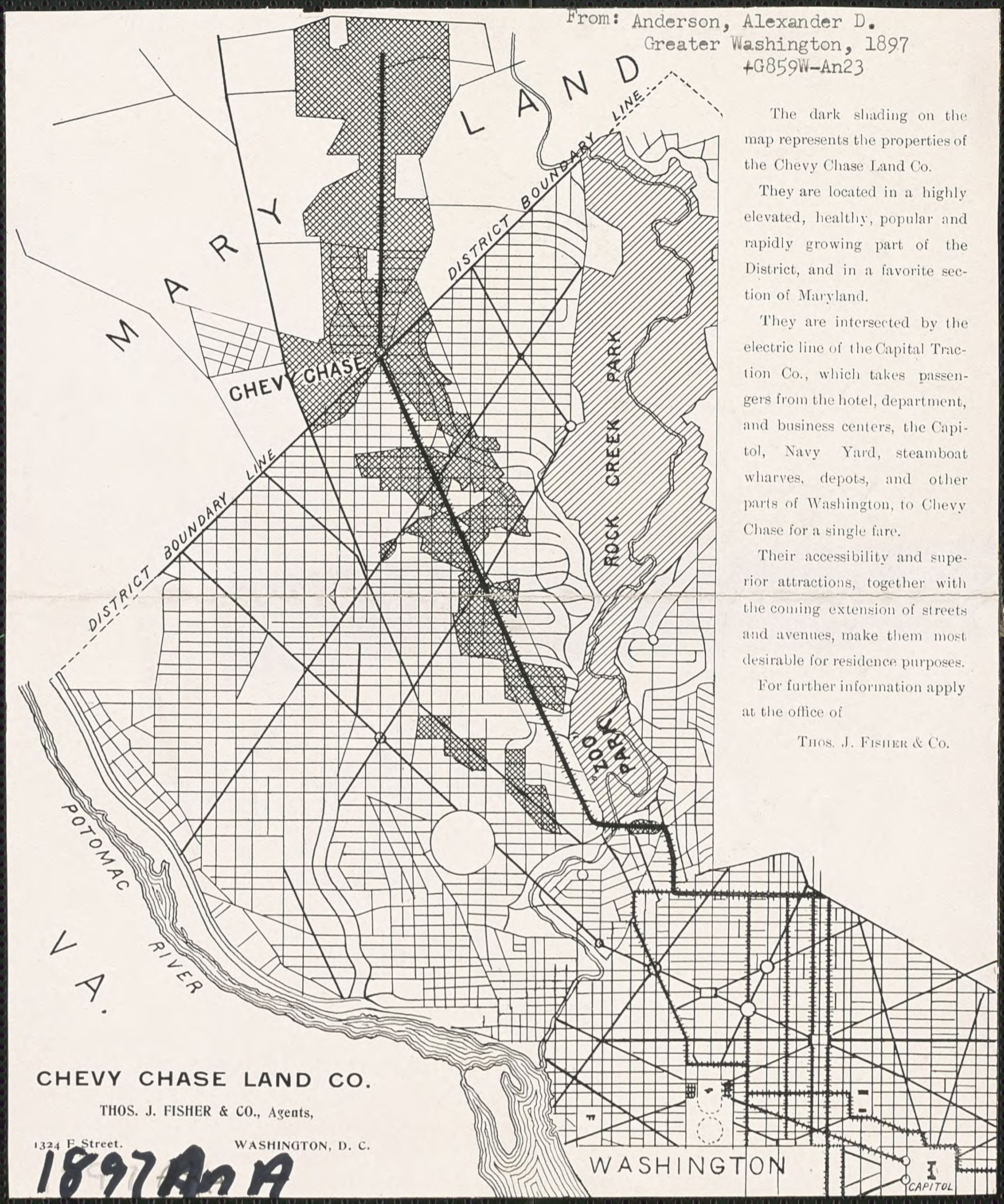
The Rock Creek Railway streetcar line is shown on this 1897 map of property owned by the Chevy Chase Land Company.

The Rock Creek Railway was one of the first electric streetcar companies in Washington, D.C., and the first to extend into Maryland.

The railroad was created by the Chevy Chase Land Company to help develop and market the streetcar suburb of Chevy Chase, Maryland. It began service in 1890, and within three years stretched more than seven miles from the Cardoza/Shaw neighborhood of D.C. to Coquelin Run in Maryland. The trip from one terminus to the other took about 35 minutes.

In 1895, the railroad purchased the larger Washington and Georgetown Railroad Company and changed its name to the Capital Traction Company, which would become one of the two major streetcar companies that operated in and around Washington, D.C., in the early decades of the 20th century. The line fostered the development of several neighborhoods of northwest Washington, D.C., and suburban Maryland.

== History ==
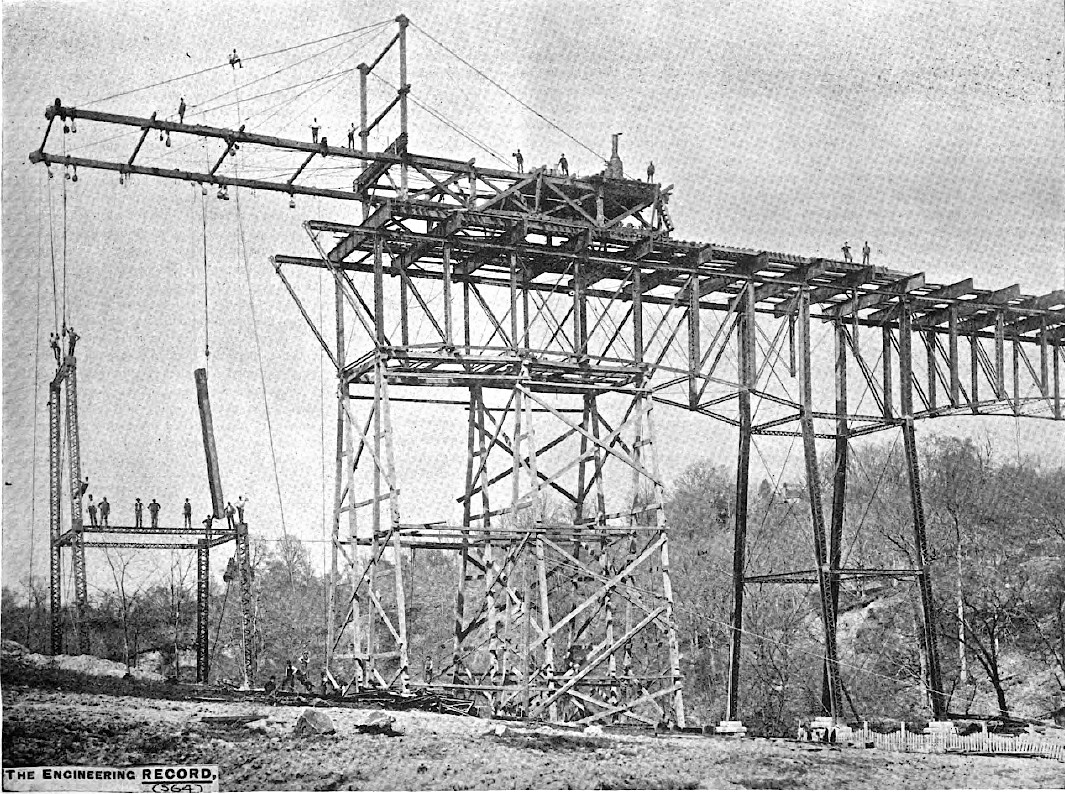
Construction of the viaduct across Rock Creek, ca. 1891

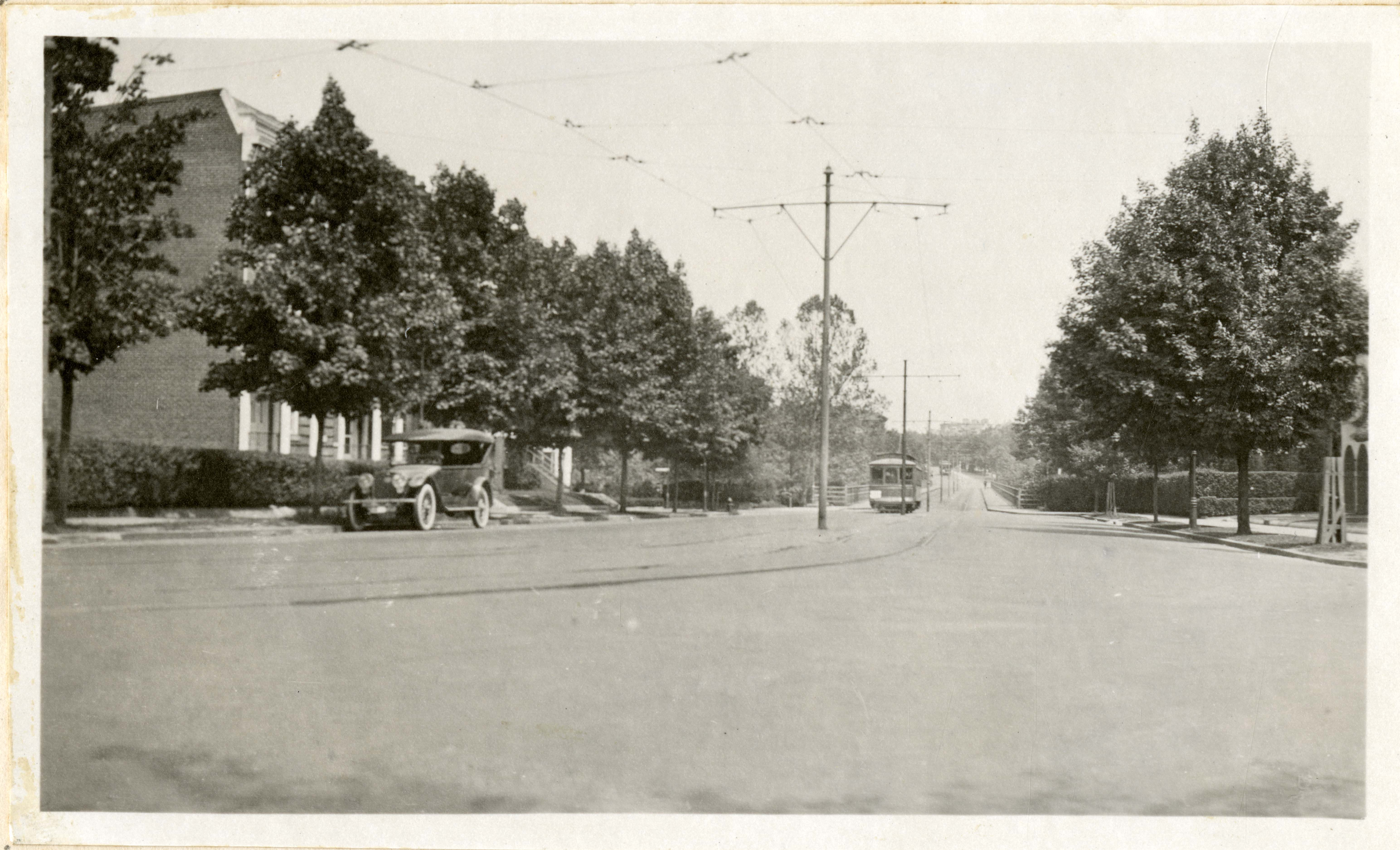
Looking east from Connecticut Avenue NW towards the Calvert Street Bridge, ca. 1920

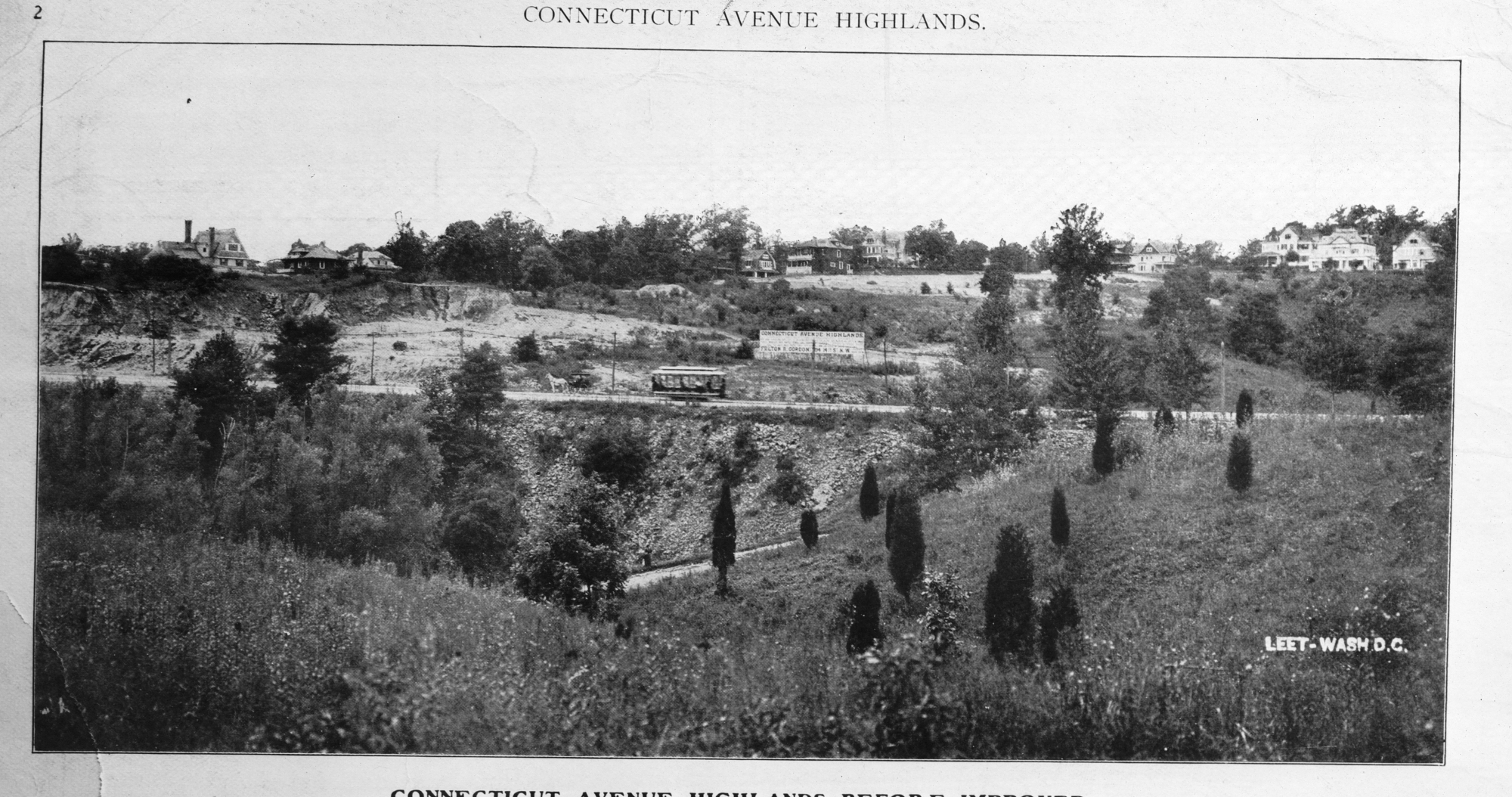
A streetcar runs through modern-day Cleveland Park, ca. 1903, near the site of the Uptown Theater

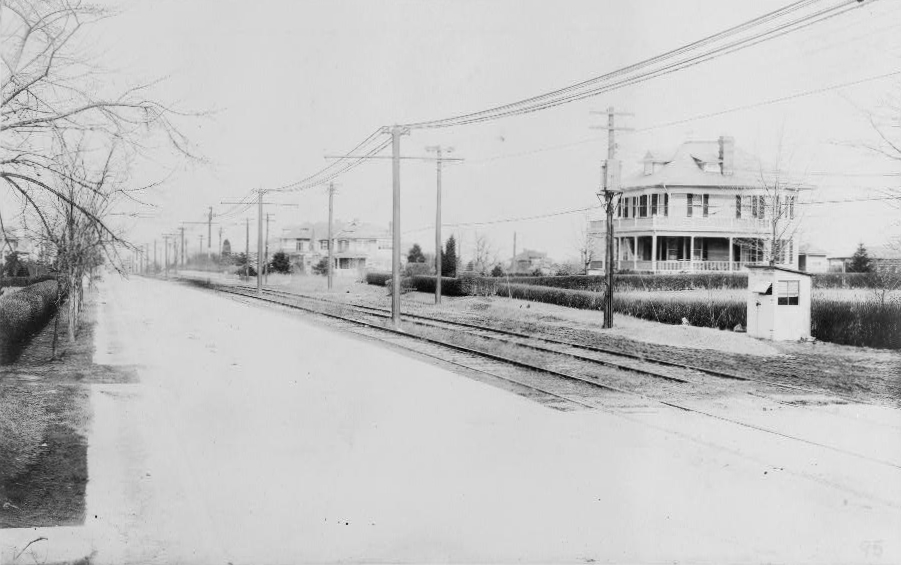
Connecticut Ave. north from Bradley Lane, ca. 1910

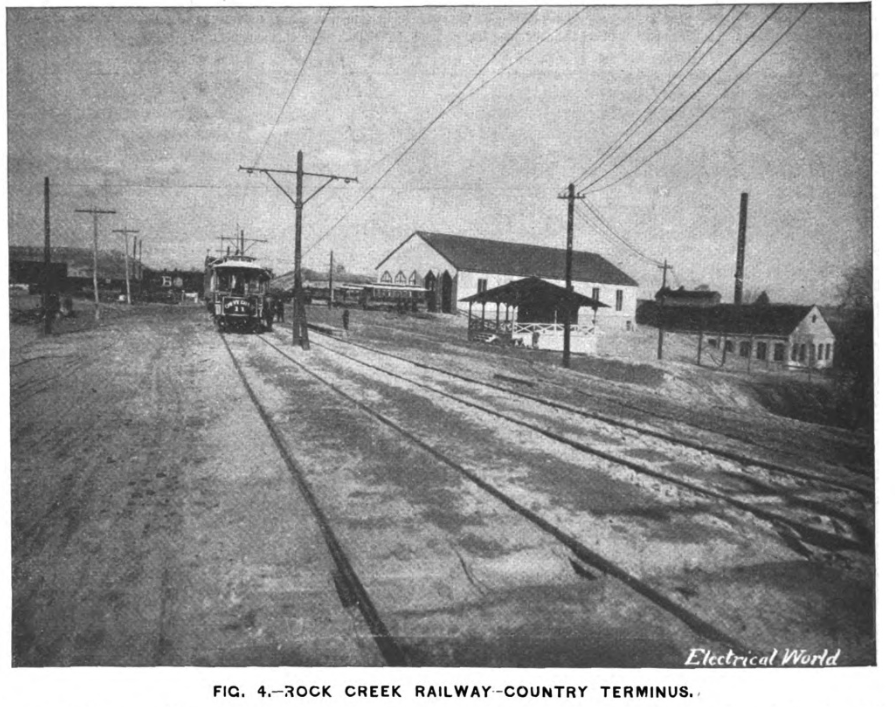
Northern terminus, powerhouse, and car barn, 1893

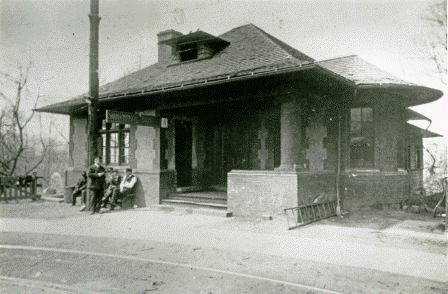
Waiting room and office at Chevy Chase Lake, the railroad's northern terminus, 1914

The Rock Creek Railway was founded by Francis Newlands as part of a plan to develop streetcar suburbs in northwestern D.C. and adjacent Maryland. He and his partners incorporated the company on June 23, 1888 (just four days after D.C.'s first electric trolley company, the Eckington and Soldiers' Home Railway). The railroad's officers were the same as the Chevy Chase Land Company's: Newlands, president; Edward J. Stellwagen, vice-president; Howard S. Nyman, secretary; Thomas M. Gale, treasurer, and A. J. Warner, manager.

In 1890, the railroad began operations on its first quarter-mile of track, connecting Connecticut Avenue NW and 18th Street NW along Florida Avenue (recently renamed from Boundary Street). Overhead trolley poles were forbidden in this part of the city, so the railroad used the Love conduit system between the rails to provide power to the cars. (These original tracks would be removed in 1899 as the city's streetcar network developed.)

Meanwhile, the Land Company was creating an extension of Connecticut Avenue northward from the Rock Creek valley past the D.C.-Maryland line and into the land that would become Chevy Chase, Maryland. The railroad would run up the center of the new road, which was graded 150 feet wide.

Tracks were laid from the original terminus at U Street NW up 18th Street through the neighborhood today known as Adams Morgan, where it formed a junction with the Metropolitan Railroad at Columbia Road. Turning west along Erie Street (today's Calvert Street), the line approached the Rock Creek gorge.

Bridging the valley was the railroad's single most difficult engineering challenge. The company hired the Edge Moor Iron Works to build an iron truss bridge at Cincinnati Street NW (now Calvert Street NW). The 775-foot, 1,226-ton bridge, whose six trusses sat on 125-foot-high iron trestles, was officially completed on July 21, 1891, at a total cost of $70,000. On the previous day, the railroad, under the terms of its charter, had transferred both of its bridges to the city of Washington, D.C.

The bridge's completion enabled the line to be extended across Rock Creek, then north-northwest along the recently graded extension of Connecticut Avenue NW north of the gorge. The line continued on Connecticut, over a bridge over Klingle Valley, to the District line at Chevy Chase Circle, then on trackage built by Newlands' Chevy Chase Land Company 1.7 miles due north to just past Coquelin Run in today's unincorporated Chevy Chase, Maryland.

“The road bed, after leaving the improved streets of the city, was constructed with great difficulty, and at an enormous expense. Connecticut Avenue (extended) having as yet been unimproved, and the country being very rugged, a succession of deep cuts and fills were necessary, as well as the bridging of several deep ravines," wrote Electrical World. Some 454,000 cubic yards were removed, including 242,000 of solid rock, 97,000 of loose rock, 32,000 of hard pan, and 83,000 of earth: an average of 75,000 cubic yards for each of the six miles. A bridge was built to carry road and track across Klingle Ford Road. The overhead wire was hung from poles set every 125 feet: iron poles manufactured by John A. Roebling’s Sons Co.

The line ended just south of the grade crossing of the Baltimore and Ohio Railroad's Georgetown Branch at Connecticut Avenue. Here the Rock Creek built a terminus complex that included a small station and the railroad's six-track car barn. Coquelin Run, a small tributary of Rock Creek, was dammed to create a lake to supply water to the railroad's northern power house. This generating plant, which burned coal that arrived on a B&O siding, used the Thomson-Houston system installed by General Electric to deliver electricity to streetcars via overhead poles. The poles—ornamented iron within the city and a mile beyond, square post lumber for the remaining mile—drove streetcars all the way to 18th and U Streets.

On September 16, 1892, service opened on the six-mile extension of the line, making the Rock Creek Railway the first D.C.-based streetcar to operate in Maryland.

Congress approved two proposed extensions on April 30, 1892. One was a northern spur to the National Zoo that was never built, but the authorization to lay track east along Florida Avenue to North Capitol Street was eventually used.

On March 2, 1893, the Rock Creek Railway opened a 1-mile extension that ran from its former terminus at 18th and Florida east along U Street NW through the neighborhood of Shaw to 7th Street NW. This double-track line intersected with several downtown lines and made Adams Morgan more readily accessible from downtown.

The downtown portion of the line used the underground Love conduit system, while the Connecticut Avenue section used cheaper, more reliable overhead wires. Rock Creek streetcars were equipped for both, and switched from one delivery method to the other on every run at 18th and V Streets NW, a process that took 30 seconds or less. (In 1899, the Love conduit would be replaced by overhead poles.)

In 1894, the line regularly operated 20 streetcars on 15-minute headways—and 7-minute headways on Sundays and holidays. The price for a single streetcar ride was 5 cents, or 6 rides for 25 cents. (It would rise to 7 cents in 1919.)

To boost ridership, the line advertised its route past the National Zoological Park, which opened in 1889. And like many streetcar companies, the Chevy Chase Land Company built its own trolley park: Chevy Chase Lake Amusement Park, which opened on 1894 just east of Connecticut Avenue at the railroad's northern terminus. A central feature was the power house's artificial lake, landscaped for boating.

One more source of passenger traffic was the Chevy Chase Lake & Kensington Railway (later, the Kensington Railway Company), a streetcar line that opened in 1895 and ran two winding miles north from the Rock Creek's terminus to the town of Kensington.

=== Expansion ===
On March 1, 1895, Congress authorized the Rock Creek Railway to purchase the Washington and Georgetown Railroad as part of an attempt to consolidate the streetcar system. Negotiations in August led to a deal in which the RCR issued stock with a total par value of $12,000,000, of which $10,750,000 was given to W&G stockholders. The actual value of RCR stock and bonds at the time was $1,500,000 ($58,050,000 today).

The deal took advantage of a peculiar facet of the Rock Creek Railway, whose revenues were rather sparse but whose charter placed no limits on the amount of money that might be raised through the sale of stock and bonds. "This providential clause was turned to good advantage in the reorganization of the prosperous Washington and Georgetown Railroad which was severely crippled by its fixed capital ceiling of only $500,000", according to a 1966 history of D.C. streetcars.

On September 21, 1895, the two formed the Capital Traction Company, the first company created during "the great streetcar consolidation."

The following day, by happenstance, was the line’s busiest ever. “The combination of a hot, fair Sunday and the reduction of the fare on the Chevy Chase electric line to five cents for a full trip from the city” drew an estimated 25,000 to 30,000 riders. The rush caught the railroad by surprise, and only by requisitioning eight streetcars from the Georgetown lines was the streetcar line able to bring home all those it had transported to Chevy Chase Lake.

=== Aftermath ===
The Rock Creek line fostered development along upper Connecticut Avenue, helping to spawn several northwest Washington, D.C., neighborhoods: Adams Morgan, Woodley Park, Cleveland Park, North Cleveland Park, Forest Hills, and Chevy Chase. Similarly, and as explicitly intended by its founders, the line enabled the creation of the suburb of Chevy Chase, Maryland.

In 1911, the rickety Rock Creek bridge was shored up by narrowing its roadway from 40 feet to 25 and adding timber cribbing; in 1922, the timbers were replaced by steel joints and asphalt surface.

In 1923, Capital Traction gained the right to run its streetcars on the tracks of the Kensington Railway, which allowed it to operate through service from downtown D.C. through Chevy Chase Lake to Norris Station in Kensington.

In 1933, the original bridge over Klingle Road was replaced by a larger and more ornate one; it would carry streetcars for just two years.

Two years later, Capital Traction was given permission to replace streetcars on the Chevy Chase line with buses. The last streetcars ran on September 15, 1935. The trolley poles, safety domes, and most of the waiting stations were removed the following week. The tracks remained for several years, but when the Export Control Act was passed barring the sale of most scrap metal to Japan it had a loophole for old rails, which made Rock Creek rail quite valuable. At that point, the tracks in Maryland were pulled up and sold to Japan by the state of Maryland. It's likely the tracks were melted down for use in the Japanese war effort.

Also in 1935, the Rock Creek bridge was replaced by the Duke Ellington Bridge. To minimize traffic disruption, the trestle was moved 80 feet downstream on rollers and kept in use while the new bridge was completed; it was demolished on December 17, 1935.

In 1937, the disused car barn at Chevy Chase Lake was converted into an equestrian riding ring for a polo club led by Mildred Pepper, wife of Sen. Claude Pepper, D-Florida.

In 1980, the Chevy Chase Lake waiting station at the northern end of the line was disassembled and moved to Hyattstown, Maryland.
