= Chevy Chase, Maryland =

- Various neighboring areas
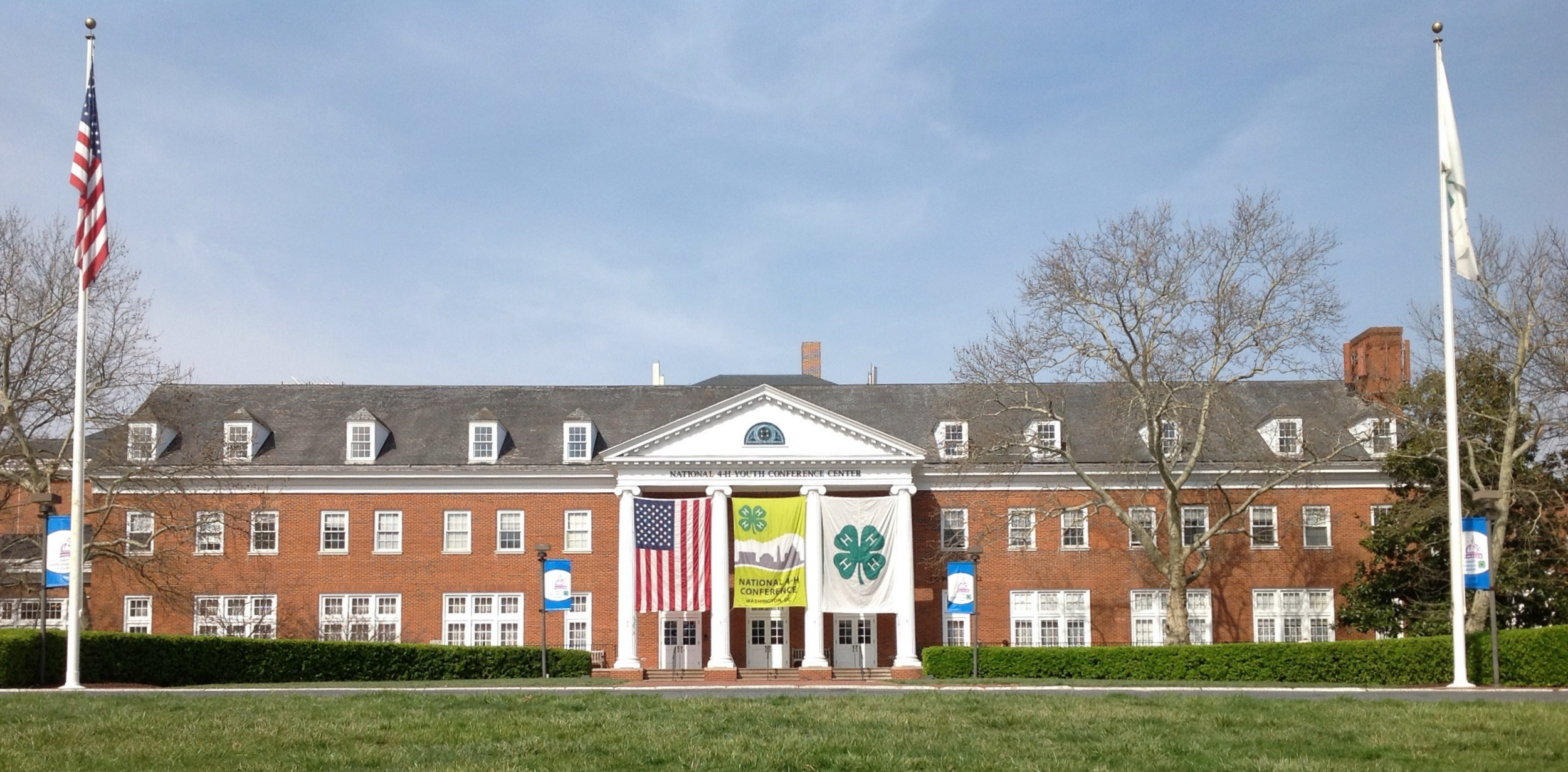
- The former 4-H Youth Conference Center, which is to be redeveloped into senior housing

- Location of Chevy Chase in Maryland Chevy Chase (the United States)
- Coordinates: 38°58′16″N 77°04′35″W
- Country: United States
- State: Maryland
- County: Montgomery
- Established: 1890; 136 years ago

Chevy Chase (/ˈtʃɛviː tʃeɪs/) is the colloquial name of an area that includes a town, several incorporated villages, and an unincorporated census-designated place in southern Montgomery County, Maryland; and one adjoining neighborhood in northwest Washington, D.C. Most of these derive from a late-19th-century effort to create a new suburb that its developer dubbed Chevy Chase after a colonial land patent.

Primarily residential, Chevy Chase adjoins Friendship Heights, a popular shopping district. It is the home of the Chevy Chase Club and Columbia Country Club, private clubs whose members include many prominent politicians and Washingtonians.

The name is derived from Cheivy Chace, the name of the land patented to Colonel Joseph Belt from Charles Calvert, 5th Baron Baltimore, on July 10, 1725. It has historic associations with a 1388 chevauchée, a French word describing a border raid, fought by Lord Percy of England and Earl Douglas of Scotland over hunting grounds, or a "chace", in the Cheviot Hills of Northumberland and Otterburn. The battle was memorialized in "The Ballad of Chevy Chase".

== Elements ==
The area known as Chevy Chase includes several entities in southern Montgomery County:

- The Town of Chevy Chase, an incorporated town
- Chevy Chase, a census-designated place
- The incorporated villages of:
  - Chevy Chase Village
  - Chevy Chase Section Three
  - Chevy Chase Section Five
  - Martin's Additions
  - North Chevy Chase

It also includes the neighborhood of Chevy Chase in Northwest Washington, D.C.

The United States Postal Service also uses "Chevy Chase" for some postal addresses that lie outside these areas: the town of Somerset, the Village of Friendship Heights, and the part of the Rock Creek Forest neighborhood that lies east of Jones Mill Road and Beach Drive and west of Grubb Road.

== History ==
=== 19th century ===
In the 1880s, Senator Francis G. Newlands of Nevada and his partners began acquiring farmland in unincorporated areas of Maryland and just inside the District of Columbia, for the purpose of developing a residential streetcar suburb for Washington, D.C., during the expansion of the Washington streetcars system. Newlands and his partners founded The Chevy Chase Land Company in 1890, and its holdings of more than 1,700 acres (6.9 km^{2}) eventually extended along the present-day Connecticut Avenue from Florida Avenue north to Jones Bridge Road.

Newlands, an avowed white supremacist, and his development company took steps to ensure that residents of its new suburbs would be wealthy and white; for example, "requiring, in the deed to the land, that only a single-family detached house costing a large amount of money could be constructed. The Chevy Chase Land Company did not include explicit bars against non-white people, known as racial covenants, but the mandated cost of the house made it impractical for all but the wealthiest non-white people to buy the land." Houses were required to cost $5,000 and up on Connecticut Avenue and $3,000 and up on side streets. The company banned commerce from the residential neighborhoods.

Leon E. Dessez was Chevy Chase's first resident. He and Lindley Johnson of Philadelphia designed the first four houses in the area.

Toward the northern end of its holdings, the Land Company dammed Coquelin Run, a stream that crossed its land, to create the manmade Chevy Chase Lake. The body of water furnished water to the coal-fired generators that powered the streetcars of the Land Company's Rock Creek Railway. The streetcar soon became vital to the community; it connected workers to the city, and even ran errands for residents.

The lake was also the centerpiece of the Land Company's Chevy Chase Lake trolley park, a venue for boating, swimming, and other activities meant to draw city dwellers to the new suburb. Similar considerations led the Land Company to build a hotel at 7100 Connecticut Avenue; it opened it in 1894 as the Chevy Chase Spring Hotel and was later renamed the Chevy Chase Inn. "The hotel failed to attract sufficient patrons, especially during the winter months," wrote the Chevy Chase Historical Society, and in 1895, the Land Company leased the property for a year to the Young Ladies Seminary.

Part of the original Cheivy Chace patent had been sold to Abraham Bradley, who built an estate known as the Bradley Farm. In 1887, Bradley's son Joseph sold the farm, by then named "Chevy Chase" to J. Hite Miller. In 1892, Newlands and other members of the Metropolitan Club of Washington, D.C., founded a hunt club called Chevy Chase Hunt, which would later become Chevy Chase Club. In 1894, the club located itself on the former Bradley Farm property under a lease from its owners. The club introduced a six-hole golf course to its members in 1895, and purchased the 9.36-acre Bradley Farm tract in 1897.

=== 20th century ===
In 1906, the Chevy Chase Land Company blocked a proposed subdivision called Belmont after they learned its Black developers aimed to sell house lots to other African Americans. In subsequent litigation, the company and its affiliates argued that those developers had committed fraud by proposing "to sell lots...to negroes."

By the 1920s, restrictive covenants were added to Chevy Chase real estate deeds. Some prohibited both the sale or rental of homes to "a Negro or one of the African race." Others prohibited sales or rentals to "any persons of the Semetic [sic] race"—i.e., Jews.

By World War II, such restrictive language had largely disappeared from real estate transactions, and all were voided by the 1948 Supreme Court decision in Shelley v. Kraemer.

In 1964, Arthur Krock wrote an article for The New York Times alleging that the Chevy Chase Country Club barred "Negroes" and "one ethnic group of Caucasians" from membership. In response, Club president Randall H. Hagnar denied that the club excluded Black or Jewish people; he said that no members were African-Americans but that several were Jewish.

In 1903, Lea M. Bouligny bought the old Chevy Chase Inn and founded the Chevy Chase College and Seminary. The name was changed to Chevy Chase Junior College in 1927. The National 4-H Club Foundation purchased the property in 1951, turning it into the group's Youth Conference Center. For decades, the center hosted the National 4-H Conference, an event for 4-Hers throughout the nation to attend, and the annual National Science Bowl in late April or early May.

=== 21st century ===
Financially undermined by the COVID-19 pandemic, the National 4-H Club Foundation sold the center in 2021 for $40 million; as of 2025, it is to be replaced by a senior living development.

== Demographics ==
=== 2020 census ===
As of the 2020 census, Chevy Chase had a population of 10,176. The median age was 46.3 years. 23.3% of residents were under the age of 18 and 22.3% of residents were 65 years of age or older. For every 100 females there were 87.6 males, and for every 100 females age 18 and over there were 82.5 males age 18 and over.

100.0% of residents lived in urban areas, while 0.0% lived in rural areas.

There were 3,897 households in Chevy Chase, of which 34.7% had children under the age of 18 living in them. Of all households, 60.8% were married-couple households, 11.1% were households with a male householder and no spouse or partner present, and 25.3% were households with a female householder and no spouse or partner present. About 25.0% of all households were made up of individuals and 15.9% had someone living alone who was 65 years of age or older.

There were 4,282 housing units, of which 9.0% were vacant. The homeowner vacancy rate was 1.3% and the rental vacancy rate was 19.6%.

Racial composition as of the 2020 census
Race	Number	Percent
White	7,623	74.9%
Black or African American	708	7.0%
American Indian and Alaska Native	25	0.2%
Asian	602	5.9%
Native Hawaiian and Other Pacific Islander	10	0.1%
Some other race	177	1.7%
Two or more races	1,031	10.1%
Hispanic or Latino (of any race)	783	7.7%

== Education ==
Chevy Chase is served by the Montgomery County Public Schools. Residents of Chevy Chase are zoned to Somerset, Chevy Chase or North Chevy Chase Elementary School, which feed into Silver Creek Middle School, Westland Middle School and Bethesda-Chevy Chase High School. Private schools in Chevy Chase include Concord Hill School, Oneness-Family School, and Blessed Sacrament School.

Rochambeau French International School formerly had a campus in Chevy Chase.

== Retail ==
For decades, a six-block stretch of Wisconsin Avenue in Friendship Heights and Chevy Chase has been the only place partially or wholly in Washington, D.C., with multiple traditional department stores. At its height, the strip was home to Bloomingdale's, Saks Fifth Avenue, Lord & Taylor and Neiman Marcus. The latter two closed in 2020, as did the indoor shopping center at the Chevy Chase Pavilion. As of 2026, two department stores remain, both on the Maryland side: a freestanding Saks Fifth Avenue and a Bloomingdale's in a multiuse center that also includes a Whole Foods Market, boutiques, and residential and office space.

Along the D.C. stretch of Wisconsin Avenue are:

- Mazza Gallerie, home to Neiman Marcus from November 1977 until 2020; T.J. Maxx and all other remaining tenants closed on December 24, 2022. Tishman Speyer acquired the property in May 2021 for $52 million with plans to redevelop it into 350 apartments and 26,000 square feet (2,400 m^{2}) of retail space. The mall was razed by 2024; a new building is being constructed for mixed-use development.
- Friendship Center, formerly home to big-box discounter Marshalls. Maggiano's Little Italy remains. Cheesecake Factory closed on December 5, 2025.
- Chevy Chase Metro Center, with big-box craft retailer Michaels
- Chevy Chase Pavilion, whose shopping center with anchors Cost Plus World Market and Old Navy closed in 2020. As of 2024, an Embassy Suites hotel and office building remain.

On the Maryland stretch are:

- Wisconsin Place, home to Bloomingdale's, Whole Foods Market, other shops and restaurants
- The Collection at Chevy Chase, an upscale outdoor shopping center that includes a Tiffany & Co. store.
- Saks Fifth Avenue, freestanding department store
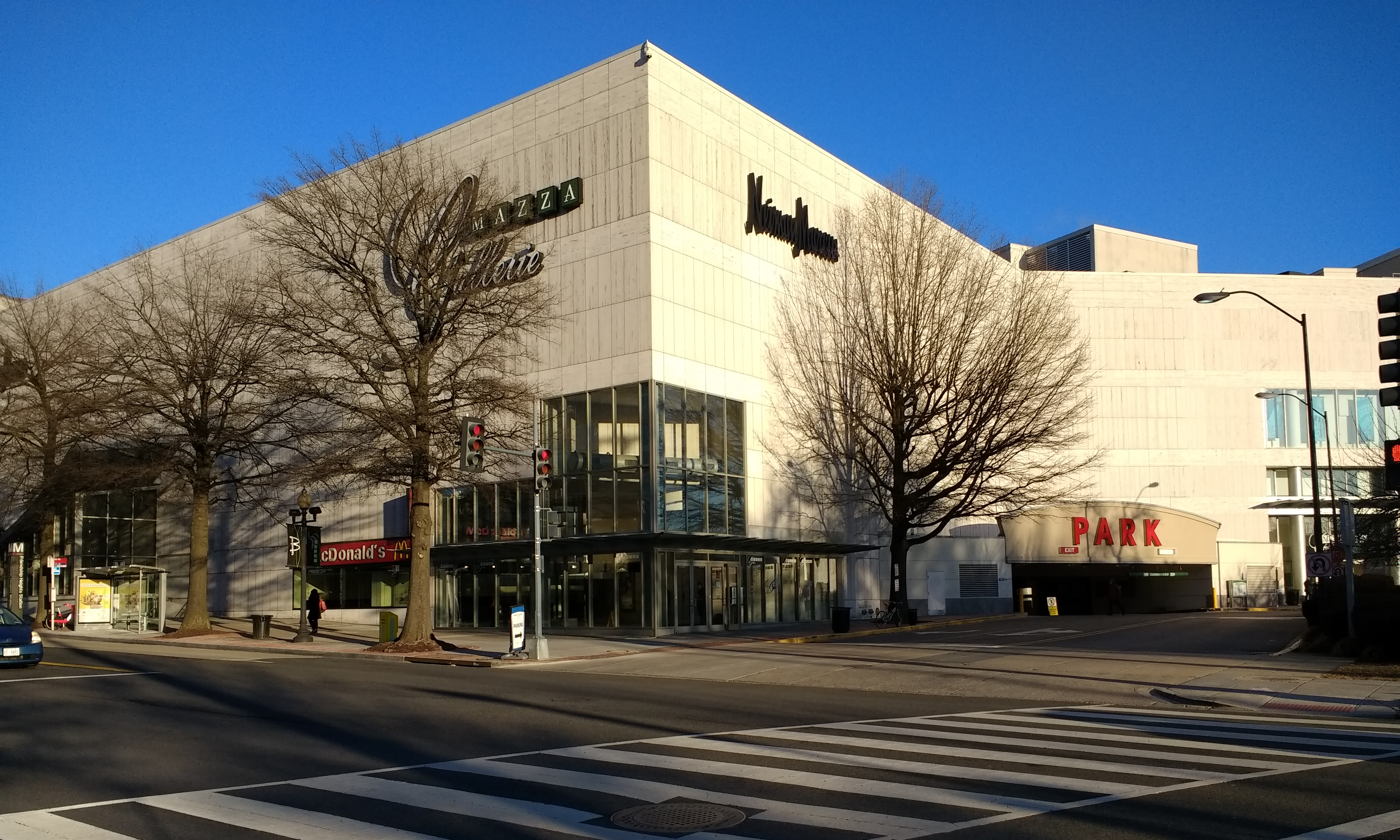
Neiman Marcus at Mazza Gallerie, opened 1977, closed 2020

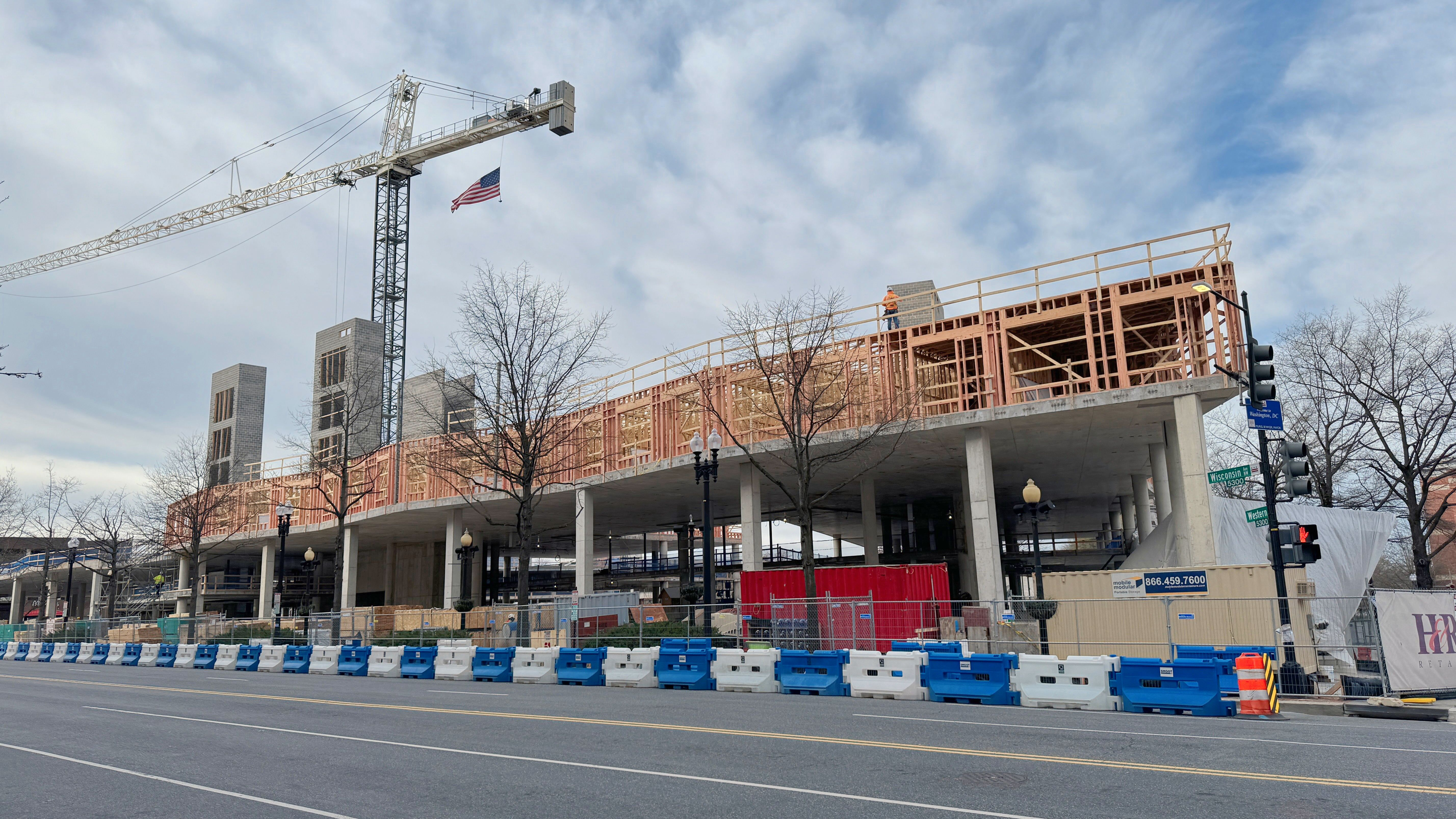
Mazza Gallerie: old building razed, new building under construction, March 2024

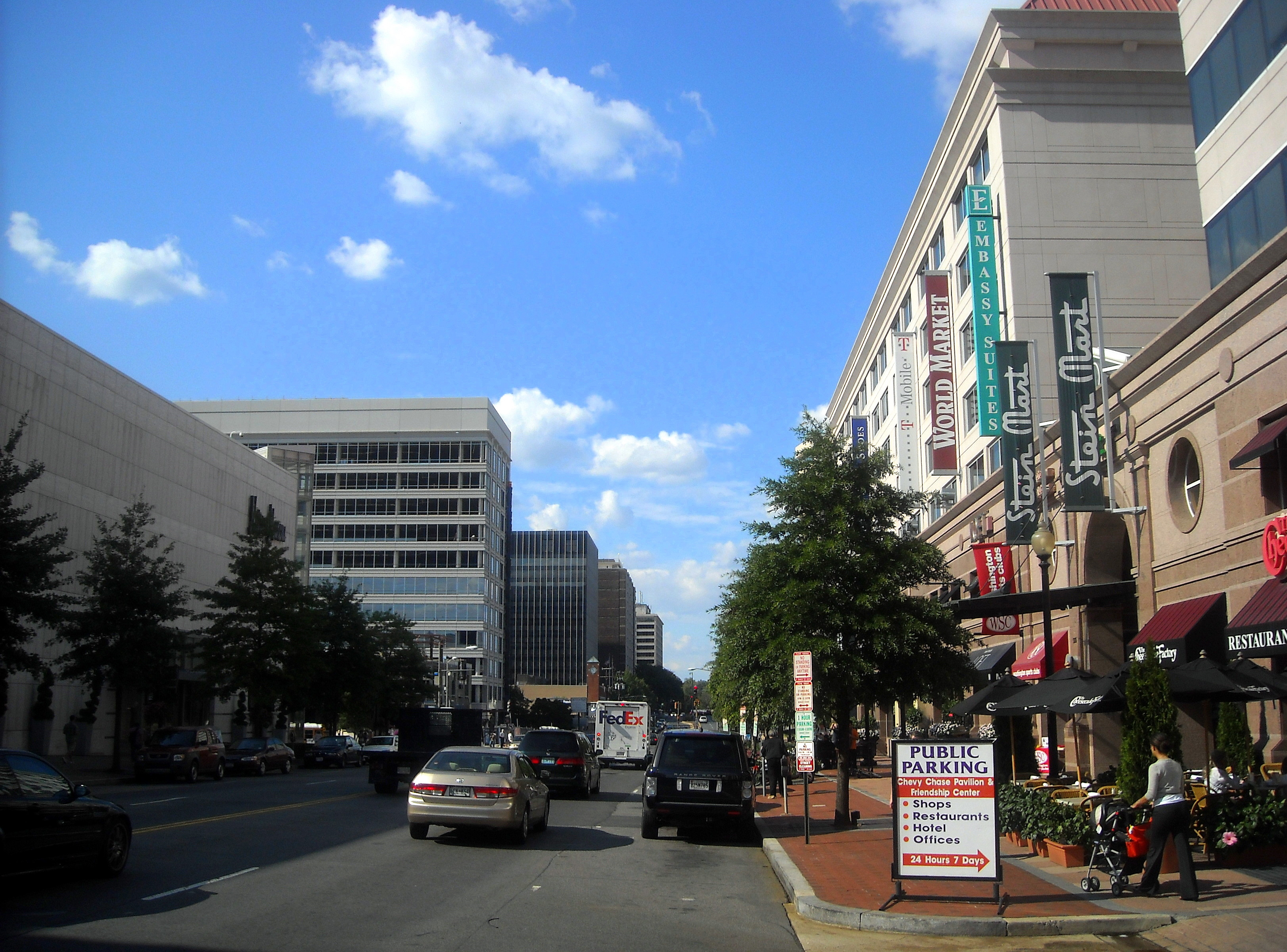
Chevy Chase Pavilion (right) and Neiman Marcus (left), 2008.

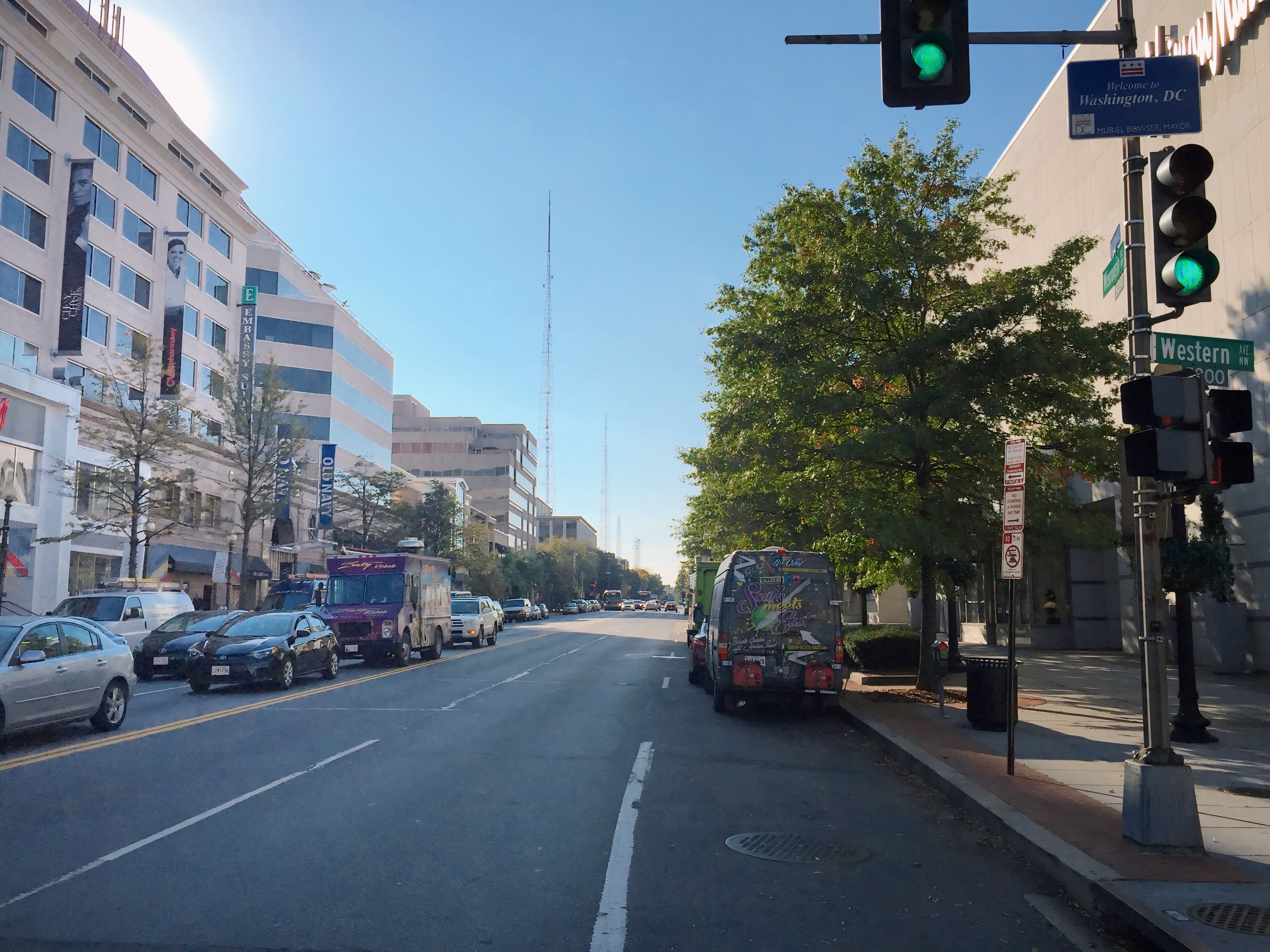
Chevy Chase Pavilion (left) and Neiman Marcus (right), 2016

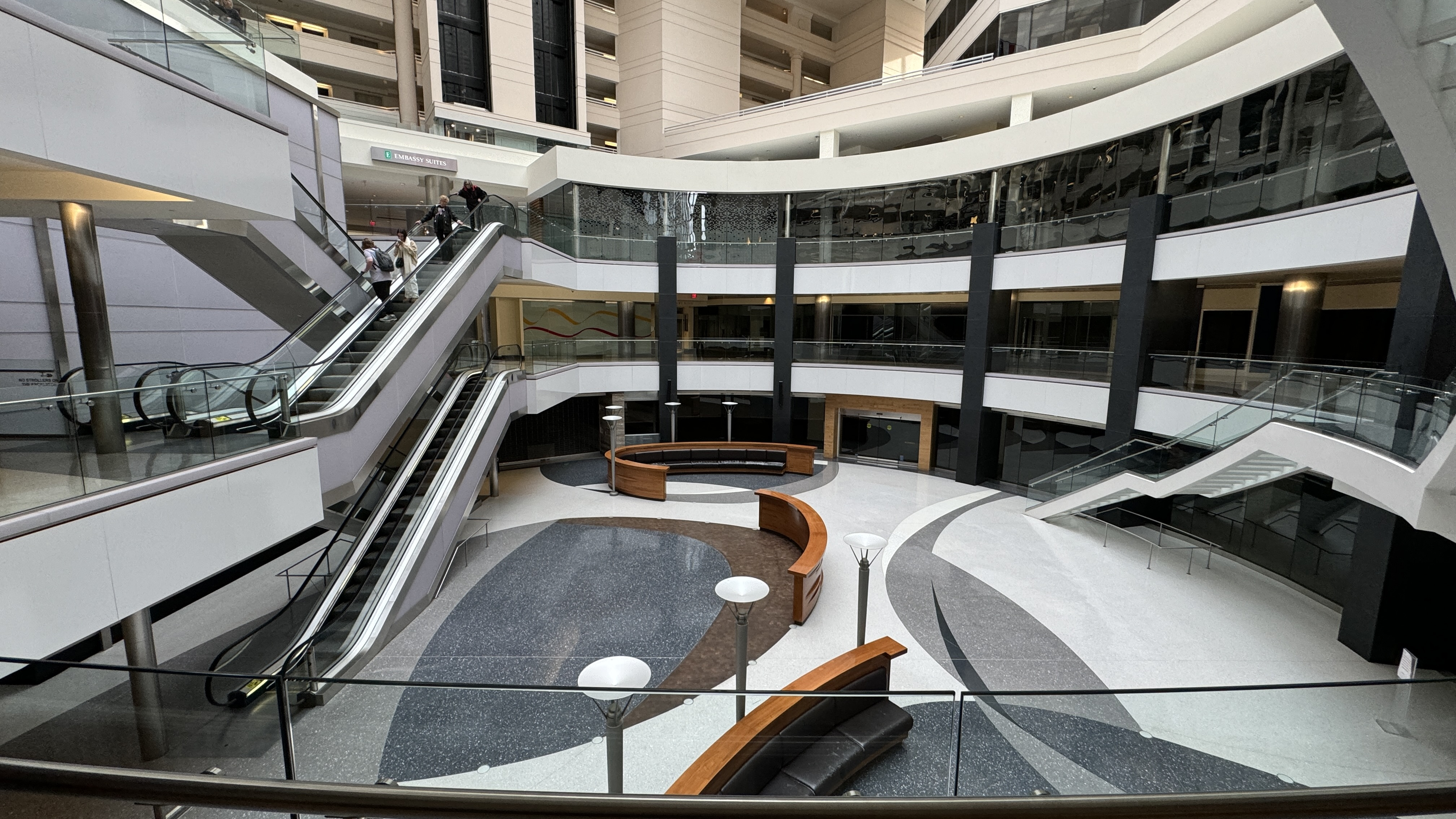
Chevy Chase Pavilion, empty retail and dining area, March 2024

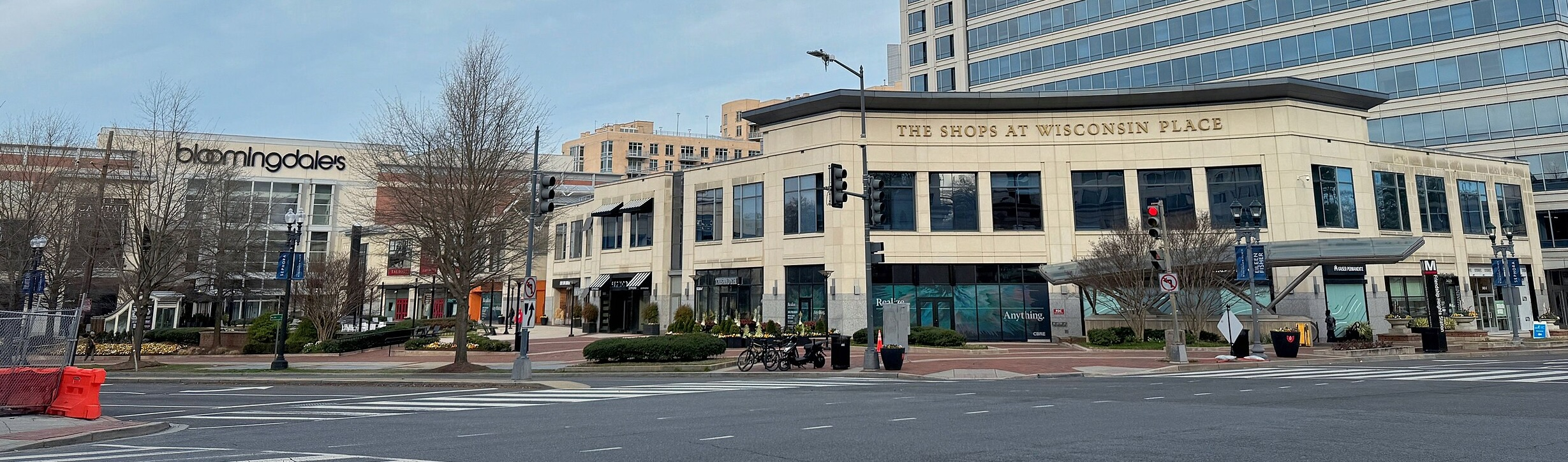
The Shops at Wisconsin Place, March 2024

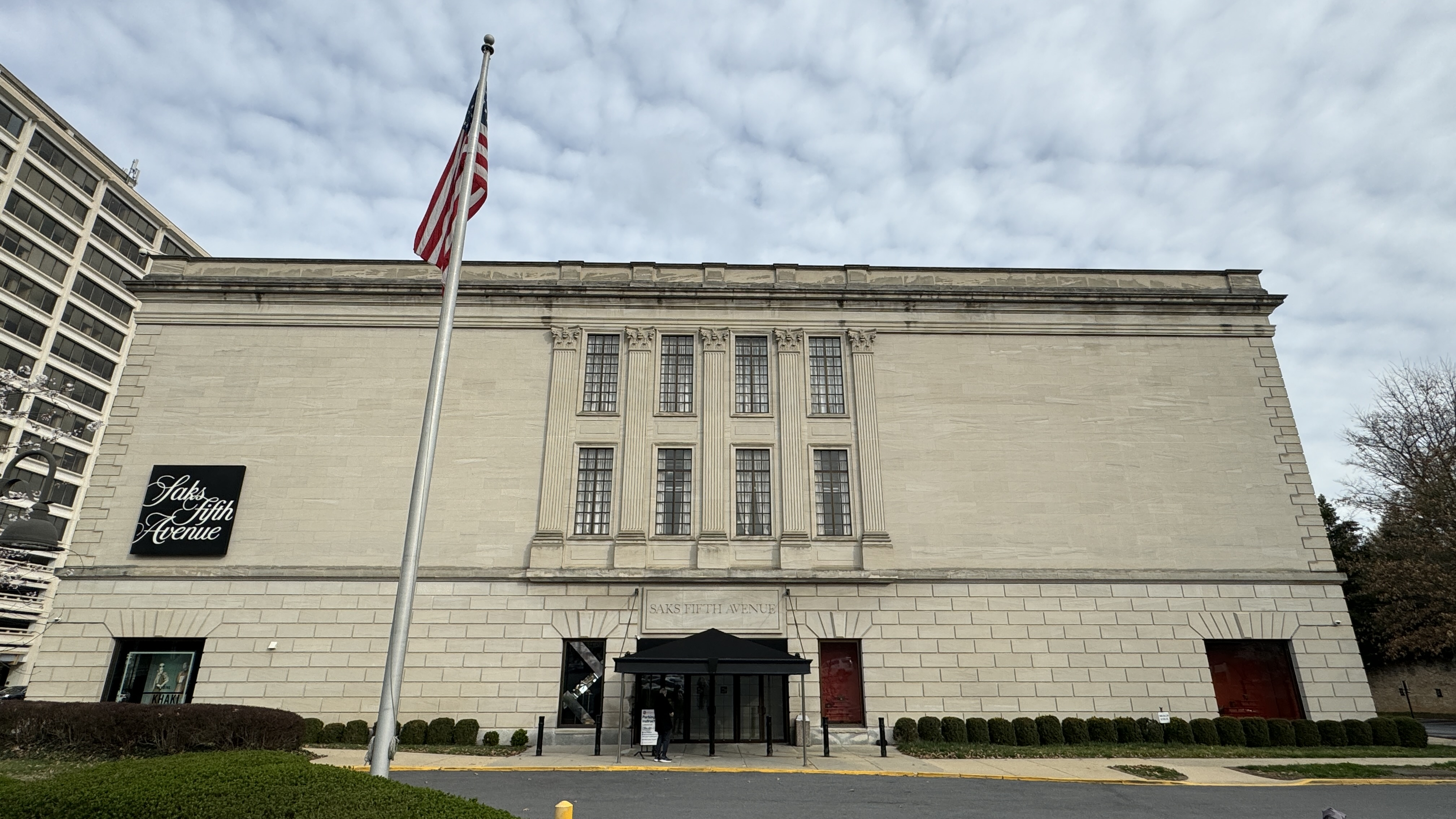
Saks Fifth Avenue

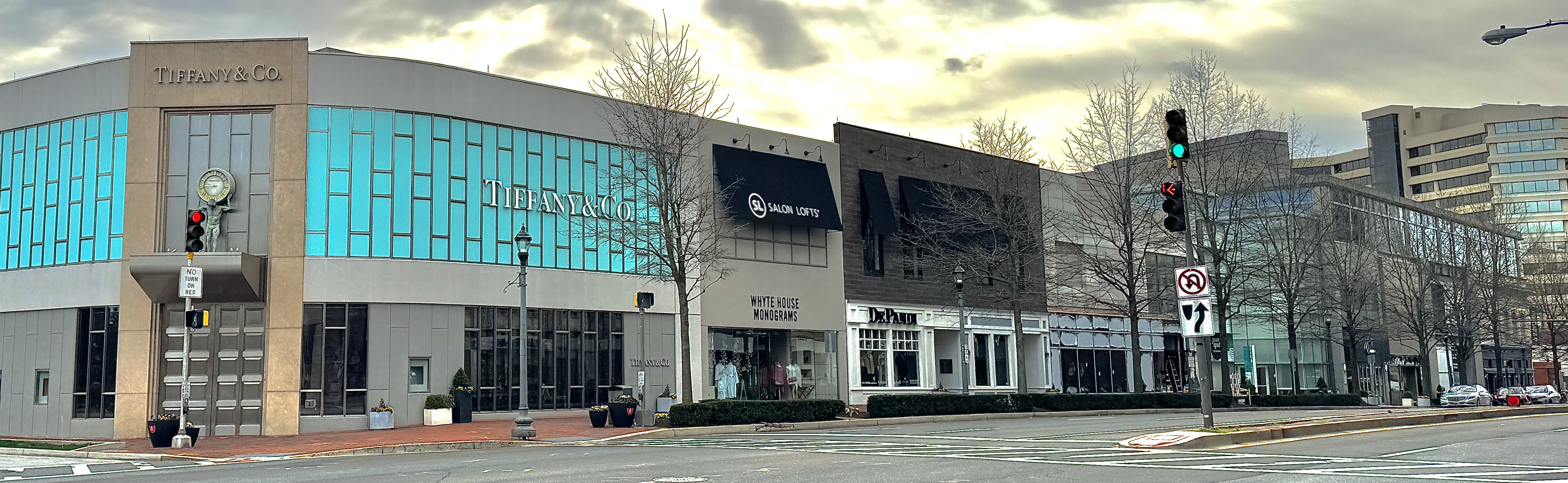
The Collection at Chevy Chase, panorama of Wisconsin Avenue streetfront

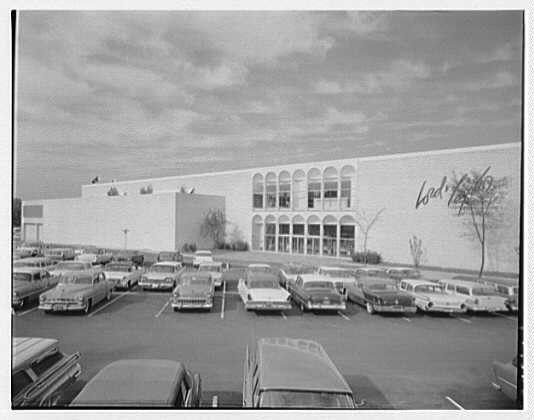
Lord & Taylor department store at opening in 1959 (closed 2020)

== Notable people ==
=== Current residents ===
- Ann Brashares – author
- John Carlson – professional ice hockey player
- Pati Jinich - chef, host of Pati's Mexican Table on PBS
- Marvin Kalb – journalist
- Brett Kavanaugh – associate justice, United States Supreme Court
- Tony Kornheiser – television host, currently ESPN employee presenter
- Howard Kurtz – host of Fox News program Media Buzz
- Collin Martin – soccer player
- Chris Matthews – commentator
- Jerome Powell – former Chairman of the Federal Reserve
- John Roberts – Chief Justice of the United States
- A. B. Stoddard – political commentator and editor of RealClearPolitics
- George Will – conservative commentator
- Portia Wu – lawyer

=== Former residents ===
- Yosef Alon – Israeli Air Force officer
- Jamshid Amouzegar – former prime minister of Iran
- Tom Braden – journalist and author
- David Brinkley – journalist
- John Charles Daly – media personality
- Mark Ein – venture capitalist
- Bill Guckeyson – athlete and military aviator
- Josh Harris – investor and sports team owner
- Ed Henry – journalist
- Richard Helms – former director of the Central Intelligence Agency
- Genevieve Hughes – one of the 13 original Freedom Riders
- Hubert Humphrey – 38th vice president of the United States
- Gayle King – television anchor
- Ernest W. Lefever - conservative political figure
- Ted Lerner – owner of Lerner Enterprises and the Washington Nationals
- Clarice Lispector - Brazilian writer and diplomat's wife
- Willis S. Matthews – US Army major general
- Anthony McAuliffe – US general
- Sandra Day O'Connor – United States Supreme Court Justice
- David Risher -- businessman and philanthropist
- Hilary Rhoda – model
- Nancy Grace Roman – former NASA executive
- Peter Rosenberg – media personality
- Danny Rubin – basketball player
- Mark Shields – political columnist
- Thomas S. Timberman – US Army major general
- Karl Truesdell – US Army major general

== See also ==
- List of sundown towns in the United States
