= Chevy Chase Lake =

Defunct amusement park in Maryland, US

- Interactive map of Chevy Chase Lake
- Location: Montgomery County, Maryland, Unincorporated Chevy Chase
- Coordinates: 38.993650°N 77.075623°W
- Status: Defunct
- Public transit: Rock Creek Railway (1892-95); Capital Transit (1895-1936)
- Opened: 1892
- Closed: Ca. 1936
- Owner: Chevy Chase Land Company
- Attendance: May–September

Chevy Chase Lake was a trolley park in southern Montgomery County, Maryland, that operated from 1894 until about 1936. It was created by the Chevy Chase Land Company, which sought to draw residents of Washington, D.C., to its nascent suburb of Chevy Chase. It was named for the artificial lake created in 1892 when the Land Company dammed Coquelin Run to power its Rock Creek Railway streetcar line from D.C. to Chevy Chase. The park gave its name to the neighborhood that grew up near it in unincorporated Chevy Chase.

== History ==
The park operated from spring to fall. In 1896, it advertised that "Donch's Band will play every evening during the summer from 8 to 10 o'clock".

In preparation for the 1912 season, the park received a carousel, renovations to its dance pavilion, and new walks and benches. Music was provided by the United States Marine Band.

In 1916, a band led by 22-year-old Meyer Davis displaced the Marines as the park's main dance band. Wrote the Washington Post:

The lure of the dance is proving potent these evenings at Chevy Chase Lake. The cars [streetcars] to the Maryland resort are crowded each night by Washington's young people who wish to keep time to the melodies provided by the Meyer Davis orchestra for dances on the big Chevy Chase pavilion. Various amusement devices, including the carousel for the youngsters, await non-dancing visitors to Chevy Chase Lake.

The following year, Meyer took over management of the entire park, which became the foundation of his sprawling dance-band business. By the time he relinquished it in the early 1930s, Davis would be the "biggest businessman among U.S. band leaders," as Time put it in 1941, a wealthy society figure whose operations included some 80 bands with 1,000 musicians playing all along the East Coast.

By 1922, a second dance pavilion had opened, featuring bands led by Davis and Joseph Shirley “Pete” Macias (1898-1947), a native Washingtonian who became a popular local nightclub pianist and bandleader.

The last known newspaper advertisements for the amusement park appeared in 1936, suggesting that the park closed after the summer season.

== The lake ==
The park's eponymous lake was created by the 1892 damming of Coquelin Run, a tributary of Rock Creek. This was done to provide water for the coal-fired steam turbines that powered the electric streetcars of the Rock Creek Railway, the trolley line built by the Chevy Chase Land Company to connect residents of its new suburb to Washington, D.C. The railway's terminal complex, some 1.7 miles due north of the Maryland-D.C. border, sat just north of the park. It included the power house with its tall chimney, a car barn, a turnaround loop, and a small station. It also served as the southern terminus of the Chevy Chase Lake & Kensington Railway, which connected the town of Kensington to D.C.
