= Coquelin Run =

Tributary of Rock Creek in Maryland, United States

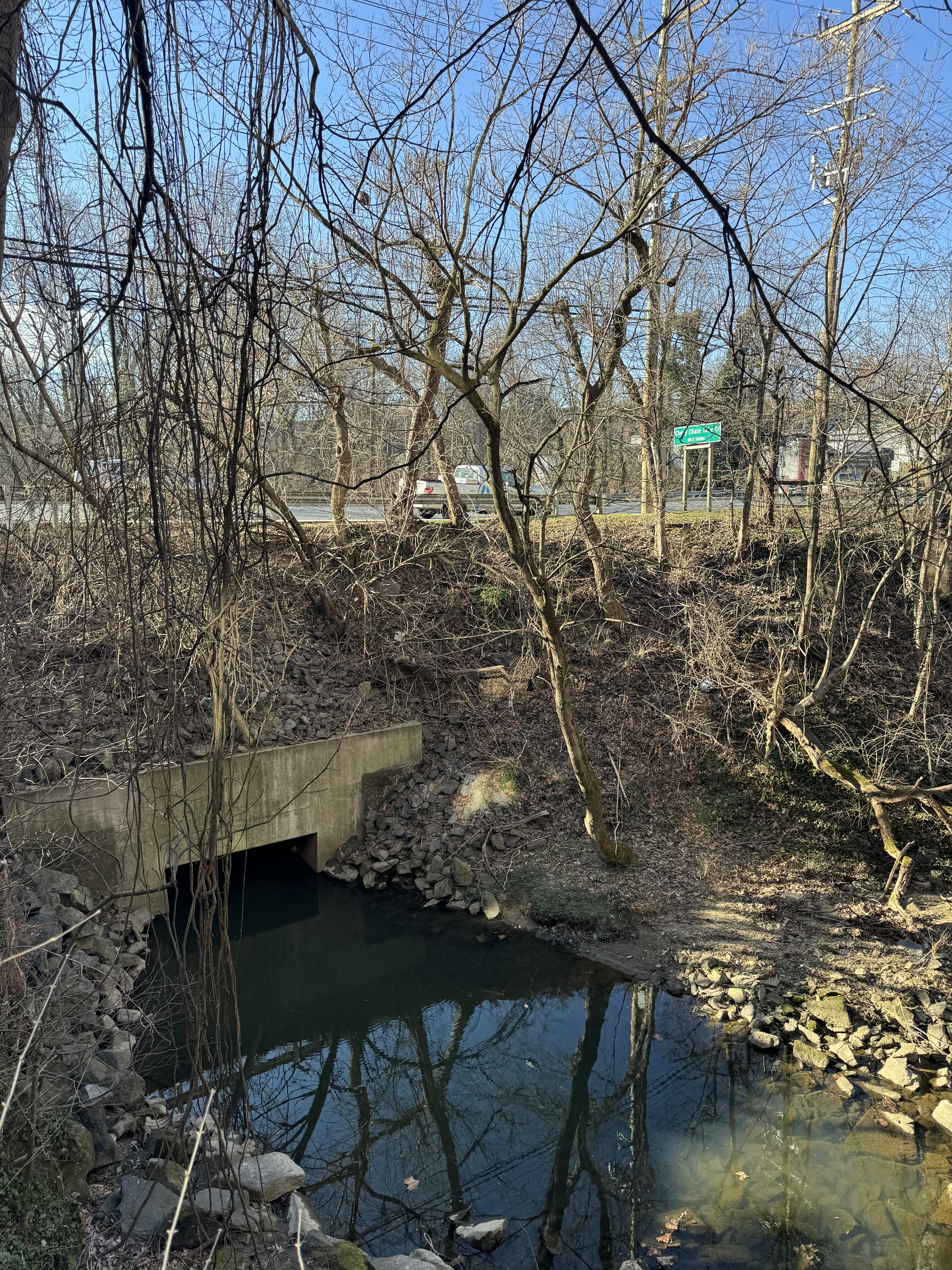
- Connecticut Avenue culvert

Location
- State: Maryland
- County: Montgomery County, Maryland

Physical characteristics
- Source
  - location: Bethesda, Maryland
  - coordinates: 38.9825°N 77.091111°W
- Mouth
  - location: Rock Creek
  - coordinates: 38.994444°N 77.063056°W
- Basin size: 1.71 mi^{2} (4.4 km^{2})

Basin features
- River system: Rock Creek

Coquelin Run is a tributary of Rock Creek in Montgomery County, Maryland. It rises in the Town of Chevy Chase, runs for about two miles while draining an area of 1,095 acres (1.71 square miles), and debouches in Rock Creek in unincorporated Chevy Chase.

While the stream valley remains largely wooded, it has long been affected by nearby urban and suburban development, and its course has been followed for more than a century by railroads and rail trails. From the 1890s to the 1930s, the stream was dammed to power electric streetcars and to create Chevy Chase Lake, an artificial lake that was the centerpiece of a popular trolley park. In the 1920s, a second dam was installed to create a pond on a golf course.

== Course ==
Coquelin Run rises in the Town of Chevy Chase, south of the southern end of Pearl Street and northeast of Elm Street Park, apparently fed by nearby springs or groundwater. It flows eastward for several hundred yards through the back yards of properties along the north and west sides of Elm Street and Oakridge Lane.

Several storm sewers carry water into the stream from nearby Bethesda, particularly a 24" cast-iron outfall just below and south of the Georgetown Branch Interim Trail. On particularly rainy days, the stormwater can exceed the stream's normal flow.

Along the west side of Maple Avenue, the stream runs into a large concrete conduit that ultimately carries it under East-West Highway.

After Coquelin Run emerges north of the road, it enters Columbia Country Club and crosses the southern part of its golf course. A landscaped channel carries it past or through holes 1, 15, 16, 17, and 18; it is dammed at the 17th hole to create a 250-yard-long pond south of the green, where it is joined by one or more unnamed tributaries.

After the stream leaves club property, it runs through woods to a culvert under Connecticut Avenue. It collects from two unnamed tributaries as it runs through a wooded, once-dammed valley, and thence to Rock Creek.

== History ==
For the first hundred years after the founding of Washington, D.C., Coquelin Run drained "a patchwork of open fields around occasional farm houses and barns." As the Civil War drew near, "by far the most prosperous Bethesda farmer" was "slaveholder Greenbury Watkins, a 52-year-old widower whose four young children were in the care of a hired governess. The value of Watkins' total estate, including land spread on both sides of Coquelin Run, was over $100,000," wrote author William Offut.

Suburban development reached Coquelin Run in 1892, when the Chevy Chase Land Company dammed it to establish the first streetcar suburb of the nation's capital. The resulting artificial lake would supply water for generators to power a streetcar line and would become the centerpiece of a trolley park. The lake covered about 3.5 acres, stretching roughly 160 by 240 yards, and was eventually populated by turtles, frogs, snakes, and fish.

Meanwhile, the company graded an extension of Connecticut Avenue from the District of Columbia to just north of the stream. A culvert was built to carry the stream under the dirt road and the double-track streetcar line that ran down its center. This was the Rock Creek Railway, formed by the Land Company to haul passengers to its nascent development of Chevy Chase, Maryland. Where the tracks and the road ended, just past Coquelin Run's northern bank, the Land Company built a terminal complex: a railway office of pressed brick, a wood-framed car barn, and a coal-fired power house with a tall chimney. Coal would be supplied by a new railroad spur: the Georgetown Branch of the Baltimore and Ohio Railroad, which ran along the northern side of the stream's valley.

The trolley park, dubbed Chevy Chase Lake, was established on the lake's southern shore. It was an instant hit, with city dwellers and suburbanites taking the trolley to boat on and swim in the new lake.

In 1910, the B&O extended its spur westward along upper Coquelin Run; the following year, the Columbia Country Club built its golf course on both sides of about a quarter-mile of the stream.

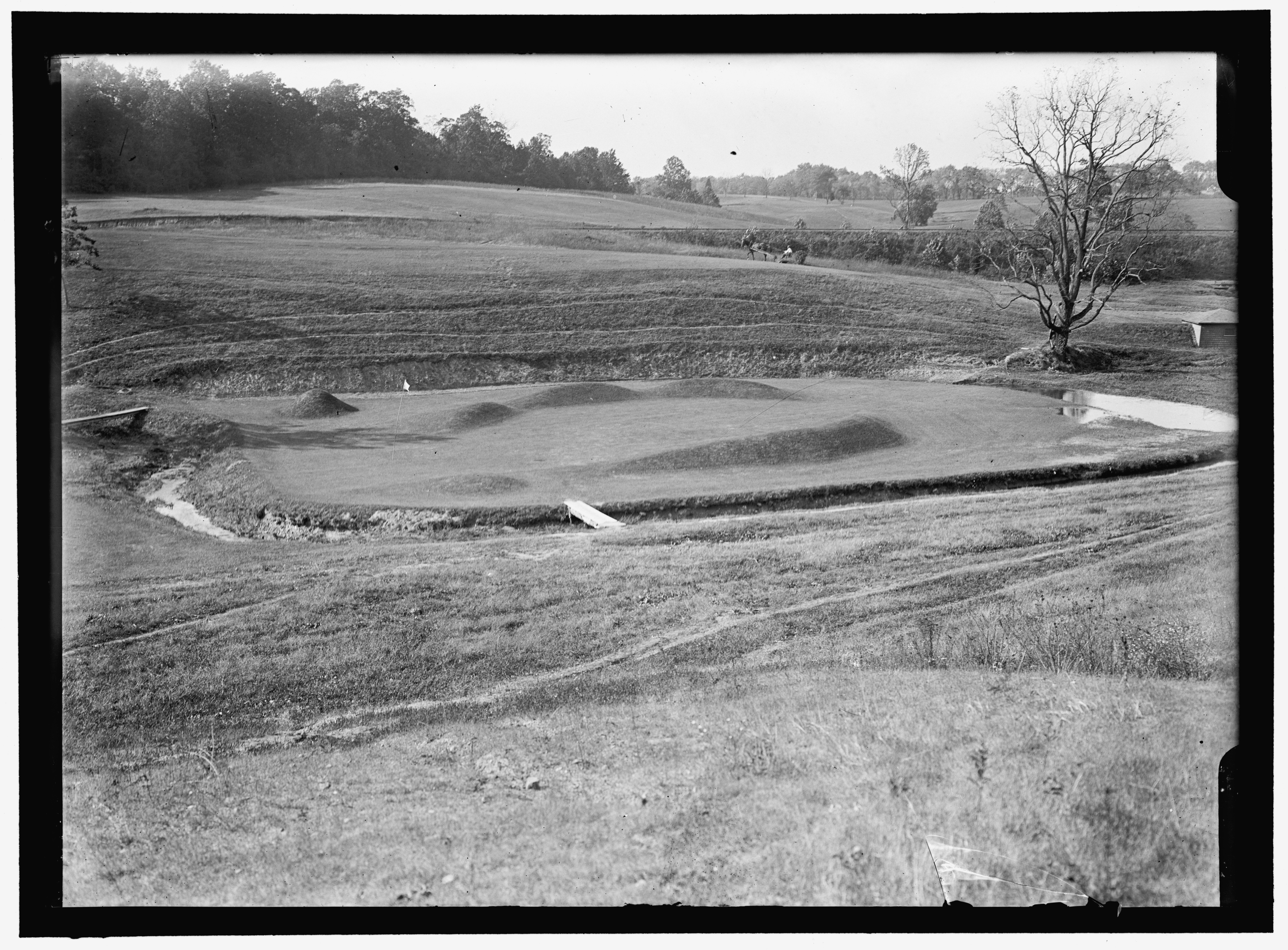
A 1912 photo shows Coquelin Run running through Columbia Country Club; the B&O rail line is visible in the background.

In the 1920s, the Columbia Country Club channelized and dammed the creek to create a pond on its golf course.

By the 1920s, the growing community of Chevy Chase was using Coquelin Run as a sewer. "In dry years, when the water in the stream was low such a disagreeable odor arose from the creek that the banks were untenable", the Montgomery County Sentinel reported. In 1929, the Washington Suburban Sanitary Commission began building a sewer pipe from Chevy Chase Lake to the District line. The line included a 12-inch pipe from Coquelin Run at Connecticut Avenue to Rock Creek, and a 36-inch pipe along Rock Creek to the District line. Completed in August 1930 at a cost of about $90,000 ($1.34 million today), the new sewer drained into a new, purpose-built line that carried the sewage through D.C. to the Potomac River.

Around 1930, the Chevy Chase Land Company removed its dam and drained Chevy Chase Lake, because of community concern over insect populations and safety.

In 1953, the Maryland State Roads Commission proposed to build an elevated highway along the stream valley from Connecticut Avenue to East-West Highway on land owned by Montgomery County. The proposal was opposed and ultimately defeated by local residents, civic groups, the Montgomery County Board of Education, and the Chevy Chase Land Company.

In the early 1960s, Coquelin Run was placed in a conduit along the west side of Maple Avenue.

In the 1970s, the country club's channel, dam, and pond were altered when the Washington Suburban Sanitary Commission built a new sewer line and water line through the property.

In 1997, the B&O right-of-way along Coquelin Run was turned into an interim rail-trail called the Georgetown Branch Trail. In 2017, construction began on the Purple Line, a light-rail line that uses the right-of-way. The trail is to be rebuilt alongside the new tracks, which is projected for completion in 2027.

In 1997, Coquelin Run was given a preliminary sub-basin/stream condition of “fair” by Montgomery County officials. This assessment was downgraded to "poor" in 2002 and back to "fair" in 2008. In 2012, a planning report noted that invasive plant species had decreased the stream's natural biological diversity, and uncontrolled stormwater had eroded banks and deposited sediment that reduced habitat for aquatic animals.

In the mid-2010s, the stream restoration firm Environmental Quality Resources worked to restore native plants and aquatic species to Coquelin Run, as well as to prepare the stream for anticipated increases of stormwater from the under-construction Chevy Chase Lake development.
