= Chevy Chase (CDP), Maryland =

Chevy Chase, Maryland
- Census-designated place
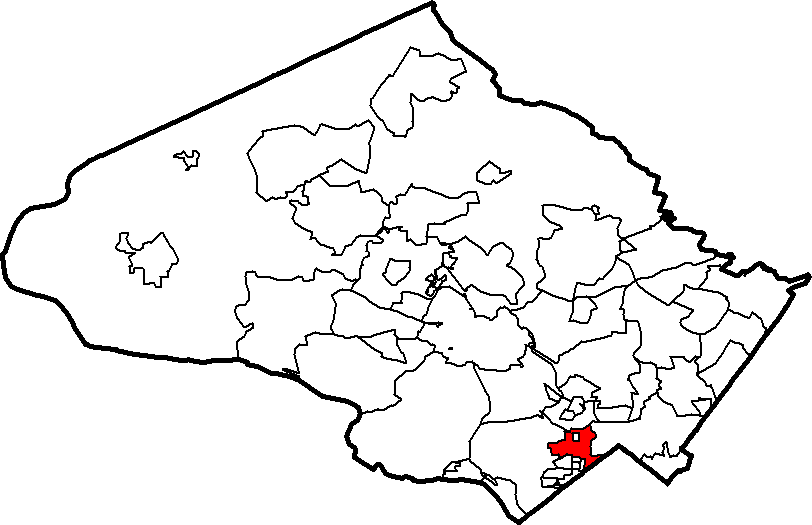
- Location of Chevy Chase in Montgomery County

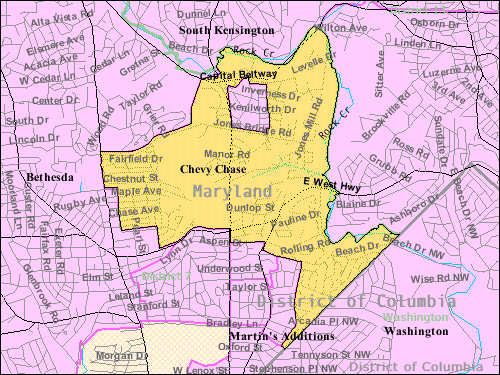
- Boundaries of the Chevy Chase CDP as of 2003

- Location within the U.S. state of Maryland
- Coordinates: 38°59′55″N 77°04′18″W
- Country: United States
- State: Maryland
- County: Montgomery

Area
  - Total: 2.42 sq mi (6.26 km^{2})
  - Land: 2.41 sq mi (6.25 km^{2})
  - Water: 0.0039 sq mi (0.01 km^{2})
- Elevation: 207 ft (63 m)

Population (2020)
  - Total: 10,176
  - Density: 4,219.1/sq mi (1,629.01/km^{2})
- Time zone: UTC−5 (Eastern (EST))
  - Summer (DST): UTC−4 (EDT)
- ZIP codes: 20813, 20815, 20825
- Area codes: 301, 240
- FIPS code: 24-16625
- GNIS feature ID: 2389316

Chevy Chase (/ˈtʃɛviː tʃeɪs/) is a census-designated place (CDP) in Montgomery County, Maryland, United States. The population was 10,176 at the 2020 census.

== Geography ==
Part of a broader area colloquially named Chevy Chase, the CDP is encompasses 2.5 square miles (6.3 km^{2}), all land.

The CDP is bounded on its northern and eastern sides by Rock Creek, a tributary of the Potomac River, and bisected by the Rock Creek tributary of Coquelin Run. The latter stream was dammed in 1892 to form Chevy Chase Lake and support an eponymous trolley park. The lake was drained in the 1930s but the adjacent neighborhood retains the name.

== Demographics ==
Historical population
| Census | Pop. | Note | %± |
|---|---|---|---|
| 2000 | 9,381 | | — |
| 2010 | 9,545 | | 1.7% |
| 2020 | 10,176 | | 6.6% |
U.S. Decennial Census; 2010–2020

=== Racial and ethnic composition ===
Chevy Chase CDP, Maryland – Racial and ethnic composition Note: the US Census treats Hispanic/Latino as an ethnic category. This table excludes Latinos from the racial categories and assigns them to a separate category. Hispanics/Latinos may be of any race.
| Race / Ethnicity (NH = Non-Hispanic) | Pop 2000 | Pop 2010 | Pop 2020 | % 2000 | % 2010 | % 2020 |
|---|---|---|---|---|---|---|
| White alone (NH) | 8,139 | 7,870 | 7,462 | 86.76% | 82.45% | 73.33% |
| Black or African American alone (NH) | 342 | 450 | 695 | 3.65% | 4.71% | 6.83% |
| Native American or Alaska Native alone (NH) | 13 | 14 | 5 | 0.14% | 0.15% | 0.05% |
| Asian alone (NH) | 274 | 399 | 599 | 2.92% | 4.18% | 5.89% |
| Native Hawaiian or Pacific Islander alone (NH) | 6 | 0 | 9 | 0.06% | 0.00% | 0.09% |
| Other race alone (NH) | 10 | 33 | 65 | 0.11% | 0.35% | 0.64% |
| Mixed race or Multiracial (NH) | 153 | 251 | 558 | 1.63% | 2.63% | 5.48% |
| Hispanic or Latino (any race) | 444 | 528 | 783 | 4.73% | 5.53% | 7.69% |
| Total | 9,381 | 9,545 | 10,176 | 100.00% | 100.00% | 100.00% |

=== 2010 census ===
As of 2010 Chevy Chase had a population of 9,545. The population was 86.7% white, 4.8% African-American, 0.2% Native American, 1.0% Asian India, 3.3% other Asian, 0.3% non-Hispanic from some other race, 3.0% from two or more races and 5.5% Hispanic or Latino.

At the 2000 census there were 9,381 people, 3,831 households, and 2,463 families in the CDP. The population density was 3,828.8 inhabitants per square mile (1,478.3/km^{2}). There were 3,959 housing units at an average density of 1,615.8 per square mile (623.9/km^{2}). The racial makeup of the CDP was 89.99% White or European American, 3.68% Black or African American, 0.14% Native American, 2.97% Asian, 0.06% Pacific Islander, 1.11% from other races, and 2.05% from two or more races. Hispanic or Latino of any race were 4.73%.

Of the 3,831 households 27.4% had children under the age of 18 living with them, 56.8% were married couples living together, 5.7% had a female householder with no husband present, and 35.7% were non-families. 29.4% of households were one person and 17.6% were one person aged 65 or older. The average household size was 2.34 and the average family size was 2.87.

The age distribution was 20.6% under the age of 18, 3.6% from 18 to 24, 26.0% from 25 to 44, 26.0% from 45 to 64, and 23.9% 65 or older. The median age was 45 years. For every 100 females, there were 84.2 males. For every 100 females age 18 and over, there were 80.4 males.

The median household income was $99,520 and the median family income was $127,254. Males had a median income of $87,688 versus $56,411 for females. The per capita income for the CDP was $60,893. About 0.4% of families and 2.1% of the population were below the poverty line, including 0.9% of those under age 18 and 2.4% of those age 65 or over.

== Economy ==
The CDP is home to the Howard Hughes Medical Institute, the second-wealthiest philanthropic organization in the United States.

== Education ==
Montgomery County Public Schools operates public schools.

Until 2022, an elementary school campus of Rochambeau French International School operated in Chevy Chase.
