= Frances R. Brown =

American educator and college president

- Born: Frances Raymond Brown; January 2, 1908; Manhattan, New York, US
- Died: February 7, 1998 (aged 90); Oxford, New York, US
- Known for: President of Chevy Chase Junior College; daughter of Barnum Brown

Academic background
- Education: Wells College, BA; University of Chicago, MA

Academic work
- Discipline: English

Frances Raymond Brown (January 2, 1908 – February 7, 1998) was an American educator and college president. She was president of Chevy Chase Junior College from 1947 through 1950, and its dean from 1944 to 1947. She was also a dean at Radcliffe College and an associate dean at Longwood College. She was the daughter of Barnum Brown, a paleontologist and curator at the American Museum of Natural History who discovered the Tyrannosaurus rex.

== Early life ==
Brown was born on January 2, 1908, in Manhattan, New York. She was the daughter of Marion (née Raymond) and Barnum Brown, a paleontologist and curator with the American Museum of Natural History who discovered and named the Tyrannosaurus rex. When she was an infant, Brown and her mother often traveled to the field with her father. Brown and her mother contracted scarlet fever in April 1910; she survived but her mother died on April 9, 1910.

Her grieving father left her with her maternal grandparents, Mary and Charles W. Brown in Oxford, New York. Her grandfather was an attorney and a member of the New York State Assembly. Because her father often worked overseas, she rarely saw him. She would visit the American Museum, where her father's assistants would take her on tours of the dinosaur halls.

Brown went to primary school in Oxford. She then attended St. Anges School in Albany, New York. She attended Wells College, receiving a B.A. in English with honors. She also received an M.A. in English from the University of Chicago. She also received a certificate to teach voice from the Peabody Conservatory in Baltimore, Maryland in May 1936. She took graduate classes at St. Hugh's College, Oxford and the University of North Carolina at Chapel Hill.

== Career ==
Brown began her career in education teaching in Baltimore and at the Hannah Moore Academy in Restertown, Maryland. She was the dean of the Mary Lyon Junior College in Swarthmore, Pennsylvania. She then led the English department at Arlington Hall Junior College. When Arlington was closed in 1942 for use by the military during World War II, Brown did editorial work for the American Red Cross at its headquarter in Washington, D.C. for eighteen months.

Then, she followed Carrie Sutherlin, the former president of Arlington Hall, to a new position at Chevy Chase Junior College. She was its dean of education from 1944 to June 1947. When Sutherlin retired in 1947, Brown replaced her as acting president of Chevy Chase Junior College on July 1, 1947. She officially became the college's president on May 19, 1948.

As president of Chevy Chase Junior College, Brown facilitated a growth in student enrollment, reaching the highest number in the college's history. To accommodate the increasing numbers of students, she oversaw the construction of a science and technology building and other expansions. However, her construction plans may have been too ambitious, and the college faced insurmountable financial difficulties.

Brown announced that the junior college would not reopen in August 1950, right before the scheduled start of the new school year. She said the college was closing due to "low enrollment, rising costs, and the uncertainty of the international situation". The latter being the Korean War. However, Brown did not give up on the college and appealed to its alumnae for financial support. She also asked alumnae to help increase the potential for more students by finding additional boarding facilities. Her efforts were unsuccessful, and its board of trustees did not reopen the college.

After the college closed, Brown became the executive director of the Baltimore YWCA. In October 1953, she became the academic dean of the Pine Manor Junior College. She became the dean of residence and student affairs at Radcliffe College on August 1, 1957, and served through 1959. In 1961, she joined the faculty of Longwood College. When she retired from Longwood in 1973, she was its associate dean of students.

== Personal life ==
Brown and her father worked in Washington, D.C. during World War II, and lived together in her apartment. Later, he invited her to join him on an expedition to Guatemala. During the trip, he shared stories about her mother and gave her a necklace from Turkey and a tile from Mexico. In 1963, she often went with him as he supervised the installation of dinosaurs for the 1964 New York World's Fair. He died shortly afterward, before the world's fair opened. In 1987, she wrote Let's Call Him Barnum, a biography and memoir about her father.

Brown died in Oxford, New York at the age of 90 on February 7, 1998.

== Publications ==
- Let's Call Him Barnum. New York: Vantage Press, 1987. ISBN 0533073464
