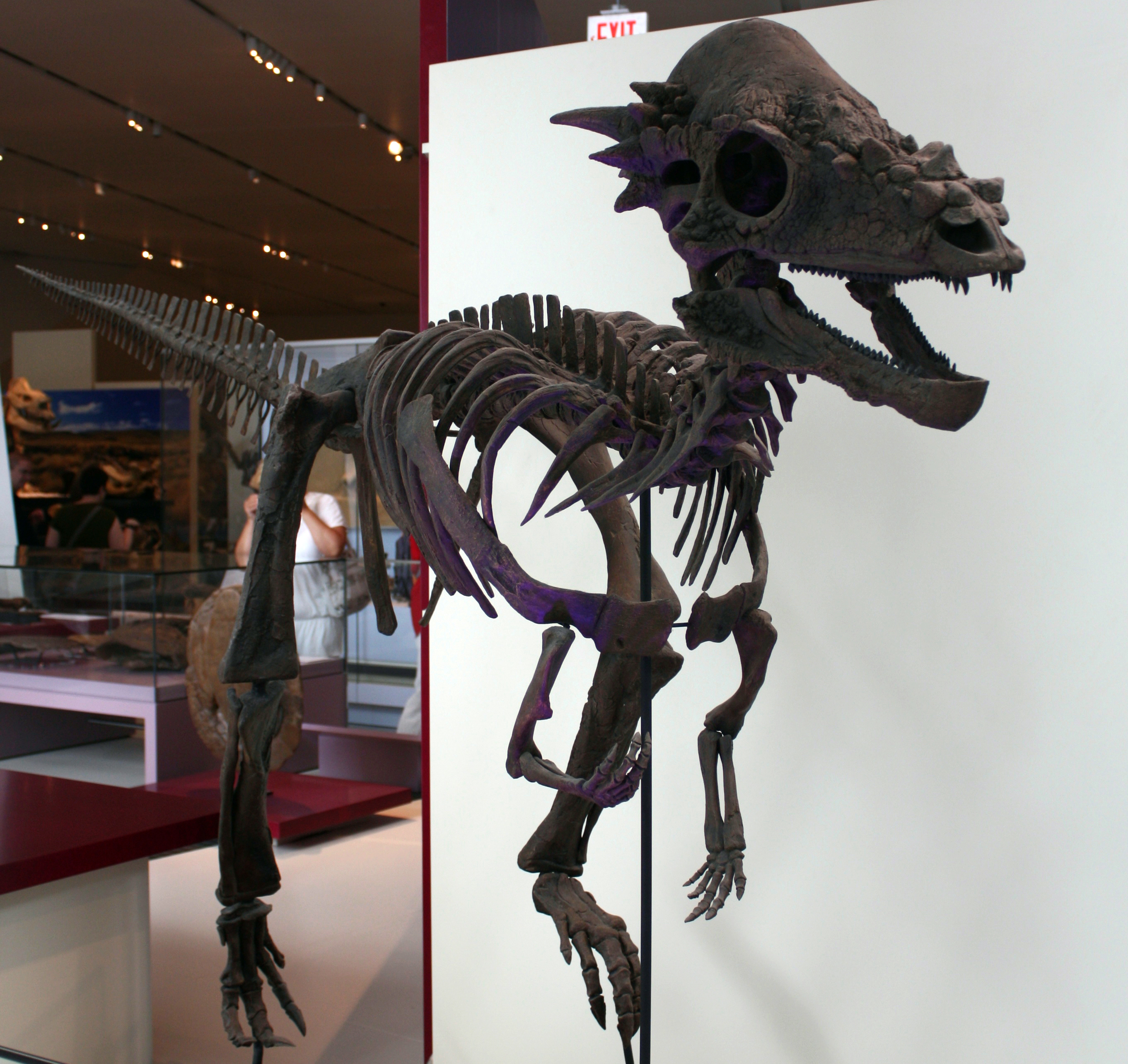
- Cast of the "Sandy" specimen, Royal Ontario Museum

Scientific classification
- Kingdom: Animalia
- Phylum: Chordata
- Class: Reptilia
- Clade: Dinosauria
- Clade: †Ornithischia
- Clade: †Pachycephalosauria
- Family: †Pachycephalosauridae
- Tribe: †Pachycephalosaurini
- Genus: †Pachycephalosaurus; Brown & Schlaikjer, 1943

Type species
- †Pachycephalosaurus grangeri Brown & Schlaikjer, 1943 (Junior synonym of P. wyomingensis)

Species
- †P. wyomingensis (Gilmore, 1931) (conserved name); †P. spinifer? (Galton & Sues, 1983)

Synonyms
- Synonyms of P. wyomingensis: Tylosteus ornatus Leidy, 1872 (rejected name); Troodon wyomingensis Gilmore, 1931; Pachycephalosaurus grangeri Brown & Schlaikjer, 1943; Pachycephalosaurus reinheimeri Brown & Schlaikjer, 1943; Stenotholus kohleri? Giffin, Gabriel & Johnson, 1988; Stygimoloch spinifer? Galton & Sues, 1983; Dracorex hogwartsia? Bakker et al., 2006

= Pachycephalosaurus =

Pachycephalosaurus Temporal range: Late Cretaceous (Maastrichtian), 70–66 Ma

Genus of pachycephalosaurid dinosaurs

Pachycephalosaurus (/ˌpækɪˌsɛfələˈsɔːrəs/) is a genus of pachycephalosaurid ornithischian dinosaur. The type species, P. wyomingensis, is the only known definitive species. It was among the last species of non-avian dinosaurs on Earth before the Cretaceous–Paleogene extinction event, which lived during the Maastrichtian age of the Late Cretaceous period in what is now western North America. Remains have been excavated in Montana, South Dakota, Wyoming, and Alberta. Mainly known from a single skull and a few extremely thick skull roofs (at 22 cm (8.7 in) thick), Pachycephalosaurus is estimated to have reached 4.5 m (15 ft) long and weighed 370–450 kg (820–990 lb). More complete fossils would come to be found in the following years.

Like other pachycephalosaurids, Pachycephalosaurus was a bipedal herbivore, possessing long, strong legs and somewhat small arms with five-fingered hands. Pachycephalosaurus is the largest-known pachycephalosaur, known for having an extremely thick, slightly domed skull roof; visually, the structure of the skull suggests a "battering ram" function in life, evolved for use as a defensive mechanism or intra-species combat, similar to what is seen with today's bighorn sheep or muskoxen (with male animals routinely charging and head-butting each other for dominance). This hypothesis has been disputed in recent years.

The genus Tylosteus is synonymous with Pachycephalosaurus. The proposed synonymy for Stygimoloch with Pachycephalosaurus, however, has been disputed in recent literature due to temporal difference in the rock layers where specimens attributed to each genera have been recovered. The genus Dracorex has been considered synonymous with either of the two genera.

== History of discovery ==
The history and taxonomy of Pachycephalosaurus is storied and convoluted, as it involved confusion with other genera, dubious species, and a lack of complete remains.

=== Tylosteus ornatus and early discoveries ===
Seventy-one years prior to the description and naming of Pachycephalosaurus, American paleontologist Joseph Leidy named the new taxon Tylosteus ornatus for a bone fragment interpreted as the armor of a reptile. This bone fragment was collected by Ferdinand Vandeveer Hayden from the "head of the Missouri River", with a Cretaceous age indicated the next year. While Leidy first identified the bone as dermal armor of a reptile, it was doubtfully identified as a dinosaur instead by Oliver Perry Hay in 1902, and then more definitively as a dinosaur by Charles Whitney Gilmore in 1928. Tylosteus remained ignored until, in 1979, American paleontologist Donald Baird attempted to reidentify the original place of discovery and the taxonomic identity of the taxon. Baird and John R. Horner independently came across the Tylosteus holotype ANSP 8568 in the collections of the Academy of Natural Sciences of Philadelphia and concluded that it was the squamosal from a skull of Pachycephalosaurus, a genus known only from the Lance and Hell Creek Formations of Montana, Wyoming, and South Dakota.

The original notes indicating the discovery of ANSP 8568 only describe the location as "Black Foot Country", with the indication of the head of the Missouri River presumably from interpersonal communication to Leidy. The specimen was likely collected from Hayden prior to 1867 as after that point he was employed by the United States Geological Survey, which cataloged finds in the Smithsonian Institution rather than the ANSP. Baird suggested that Leidy's identification of the head of the Missouri River, commonly accepted even at the time to refer to the confluence of the Jefferson and Madison Rivers, was the result of a misunderstanding, as such a location was well away from Blackfoot country.

Instead, a provenance of the head of the Little Missouri River, which was a significant stop on Hayden's expedition of 1859–1860, would be a more probable location. Though the original locality cannot be determined, Hayden's route in the expedition led between the Little Missouri and Little Powder Rivers, across the sediments of the Hell Creek Formation, from where Tylosteus likely originated. This would be approximately 45 mi (72 km) south from the type locality of Pachycephalosaurus grangeri, and 140 mi (230 km) north from the type locality of P. wyomingensis, none of which can be distinguished anatomically. Because Tylosteus had remained essentially unused since first named, Baird advocated for conserving Pachycephalosaurus and rendering Tylosteus ornatus a nomen oblitum, which was affirmed by the International Commission on Zoological Nomenclature in 1986 where Tylosteus was made a nomen rejectum and Pachycephalosaurus a nomen conservandum. A manual ungual was also assigned to Tylosteus by Leidy (1873), however it is now believed to belong to Edmontosaurus annectens.

In 1890, during the Bone Wars between Othniel Charles Marsh and Edward Drinker Cope, one of Marsh's collectors, John Bell Hatcher, collected a partial left squamosal (YPM VP 335) of a dinosaur near Lance Creek, Wyoming, in the Lance Formation. This specimen has since been assigned to Stygimoloch spinifer, a possible synonym of Pachycephalosaurus. In 1892, Marsh interpreted the squamosal and the dermal armor of Denversaurus as being the body armor of Triceratops, hypothesizing that the squamosal was a spike akin to the plates on Stegosaurus. The squamosal spike was even featured in Charles Knight's painting of Cope's ceratopsid Agathaumas, likely based on Marsh's hypothesis. The same year, Marsh also named a species of now-dubious ankylosaur Palaeoscincus, P. latus, on the basis of a single tooth (YPM 4810), also collected by Hatcher from the Lance. In 1990, American paleontologist W. P. Coombs stated the tooth came from a pachycephalosaurid, possibly even Pachycephalosaurus itself. Hatcher also collected several additional teeth and skull fragments while working for Marsh, though these have yet to be described.

=== Troodon wyomingensis ===
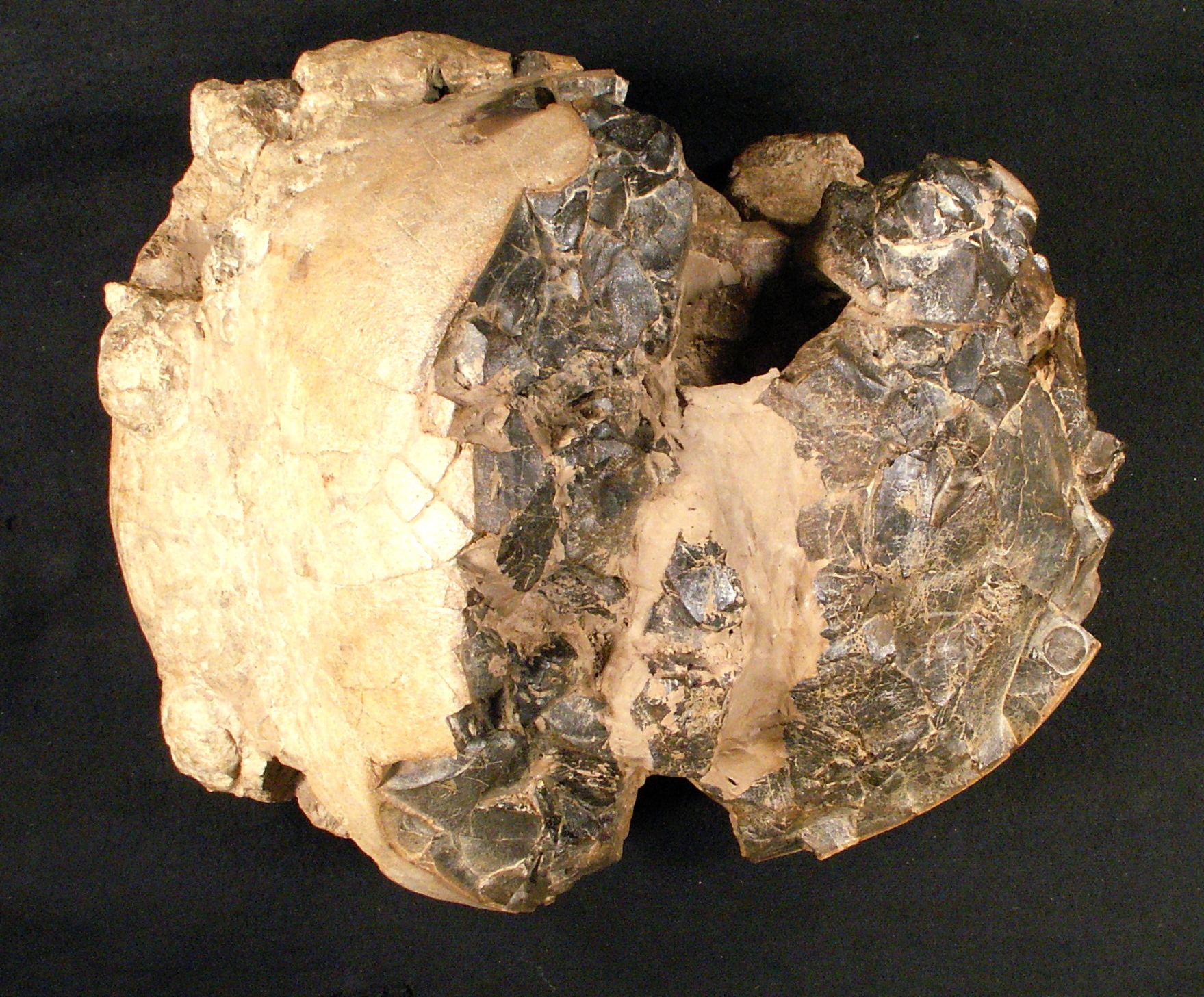
Holotype of P. wyomingensis

In 1930, American paleontologist George Fryer Sternberg discovered a partial skull within the Lance Formation of Niobrara County, Wyoming, around 9 mi (14 km) southwest of Warren Post Office along Buck Creek. This specimen, USNM 12031, was then described by Gilmore in 1931 as the holotype of a new species Troödon wyomingensis, and suggested more definitively that the genus Troodon was present in the Lance Formation. Previously, isolated teeth from the region had been suggested to be from Troodon. Troodon itself had first been described by Leidy in 1856 as a lizard from the Judith River Formation of Montana, but with the 1924 description of a nearly complete skull and partial skeleton from the Belly River Group in Alberta Gilmore found Troodon to be the same as the existing ornithischian genus Stegoceras. T. wyomingensis could not be compared with the type species of Troodon, T. formosus, as the latter only preserved teeth, but significant differences in size, the supratemporal fenestra, and age could separate T. wyomingensis and T. validus (previously Stegoceras), potentially even to the point of requiring a new genus name for T. wyomingensis. As well as USNM 12031, Gilmore referred the specimens USNM 7806 and 8795 to T. wyomingensis.

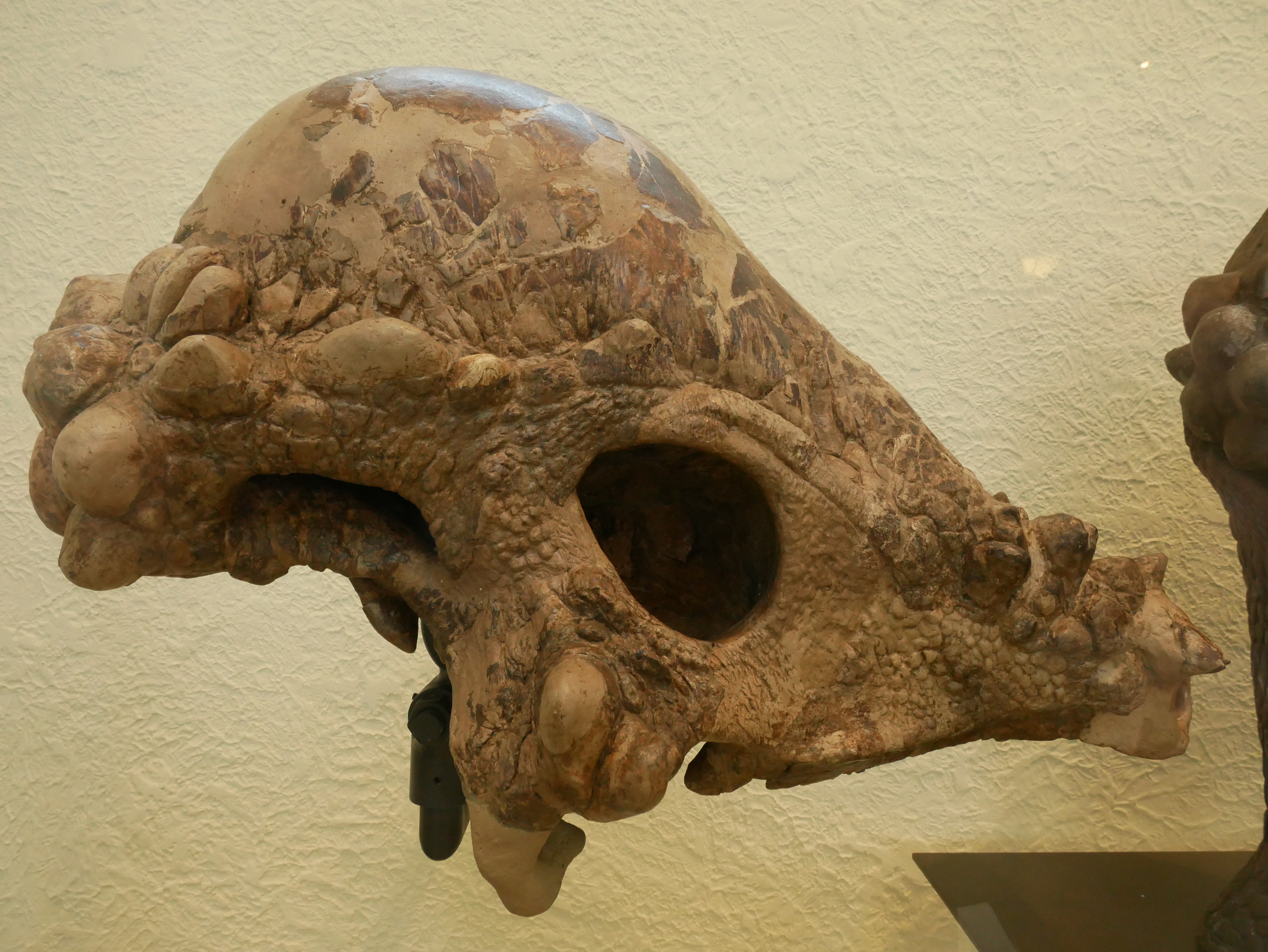
Skull of AMNH FARB 1696

P. wyomingensis, the type and currently only valid species of Pachycephalosaurus, was named by Charles W. Gilmore in 1931. He coined it for the partial skull USNM 12031, from the Lance Formation of Niobrara County, Wyoming. Gilmore assigned his new species to Troodon as T. wyomingensis. At the time, paleontologists thought that Troodon, then known only from teeth, was the same as Stegoceras, which had similar teeth. Accordingly, what are now known as pachycephalosaurids were assigned to the family Troodontidae, a misconception which was not corrected until 1945 by Charles M. Sternberg.

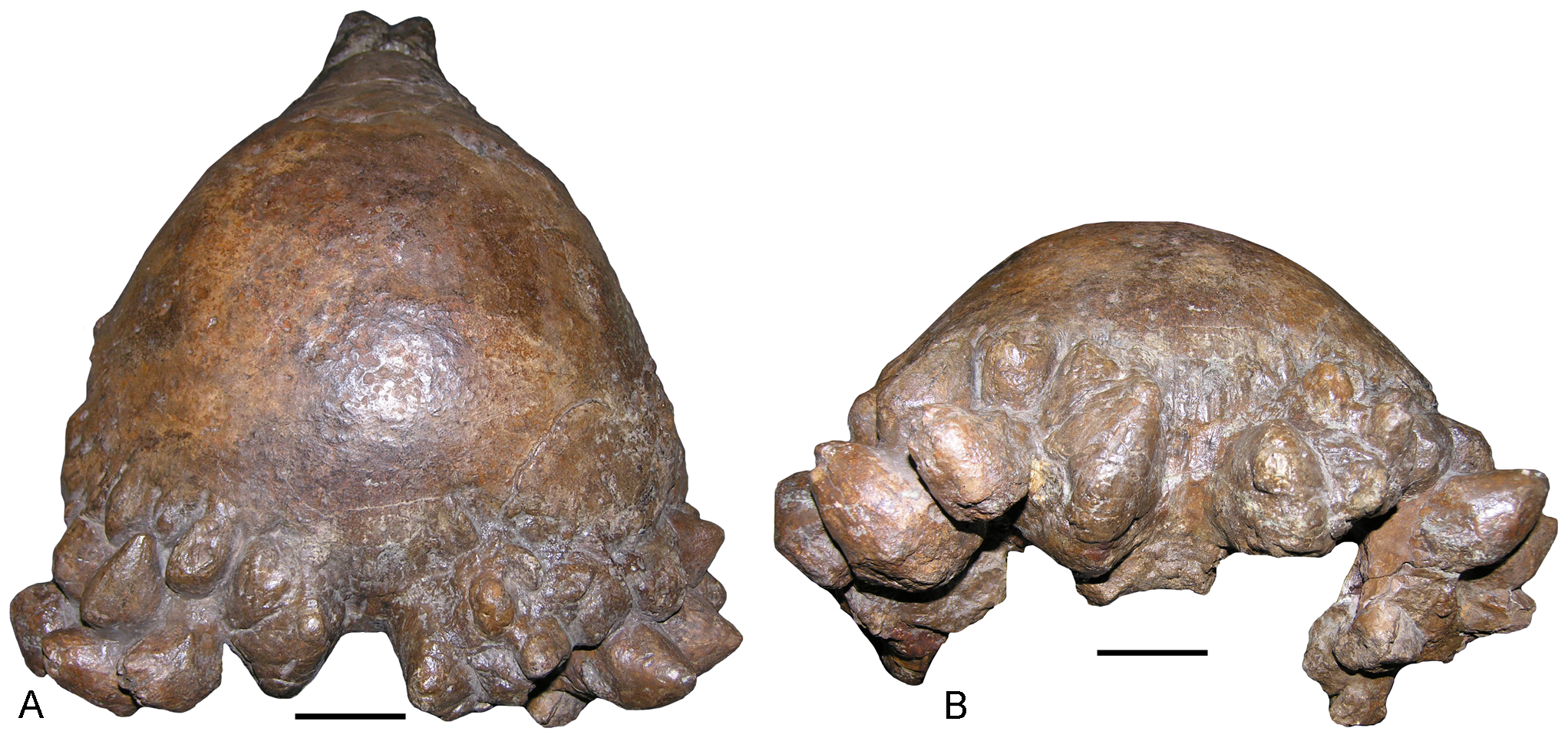
The holotype adult skull of P. "reinheimeri" (DMNS 469)

In 1943, Barnum Brown and Erich Maren Schlaikjer, with newer, more complete material, established the genus Pachycephalosaurus. They named two species: Pachycephalosaurus grangeri, the type species of their new genus, and Pachycephalosaurus reinheimeri. P. grangeri was based on AMNH 1696, a nearly complete skull from the Hell Creek Formation of Ekalaka, Carter County, Montana. P. reinheimeri was based on what is now DMNS 469, a dome and a few associated elements from the Lance Formation of Corson County, South Dakota. They also referred the older species "Troodon" wyomingensis to their new genus. Their two newer species have been considered synonymous with P. wyomingensis since 1983.

In 2015, some pachycephalosaurid material and a domed parietal attributable to Pachycephalosaurus were discovered in the Scollard Formation of Alberta, implying that the dinosaurs of this era were cosmopolitan and did not have discrete faunal provinces. In 2025, Wroblewski described a partial squamosal (UW 26525) and two teeth (UW 26611 and UW 26526) from the Ferris Formation as Stygimoloch spinifer, which would be its southernmost record. A 2026 study mentioned the discovery of an associated skeleton of Stygimoloch including cranial and postcranial material, that is now deposited at the National Science Museum in Tokyo.

== Description ==
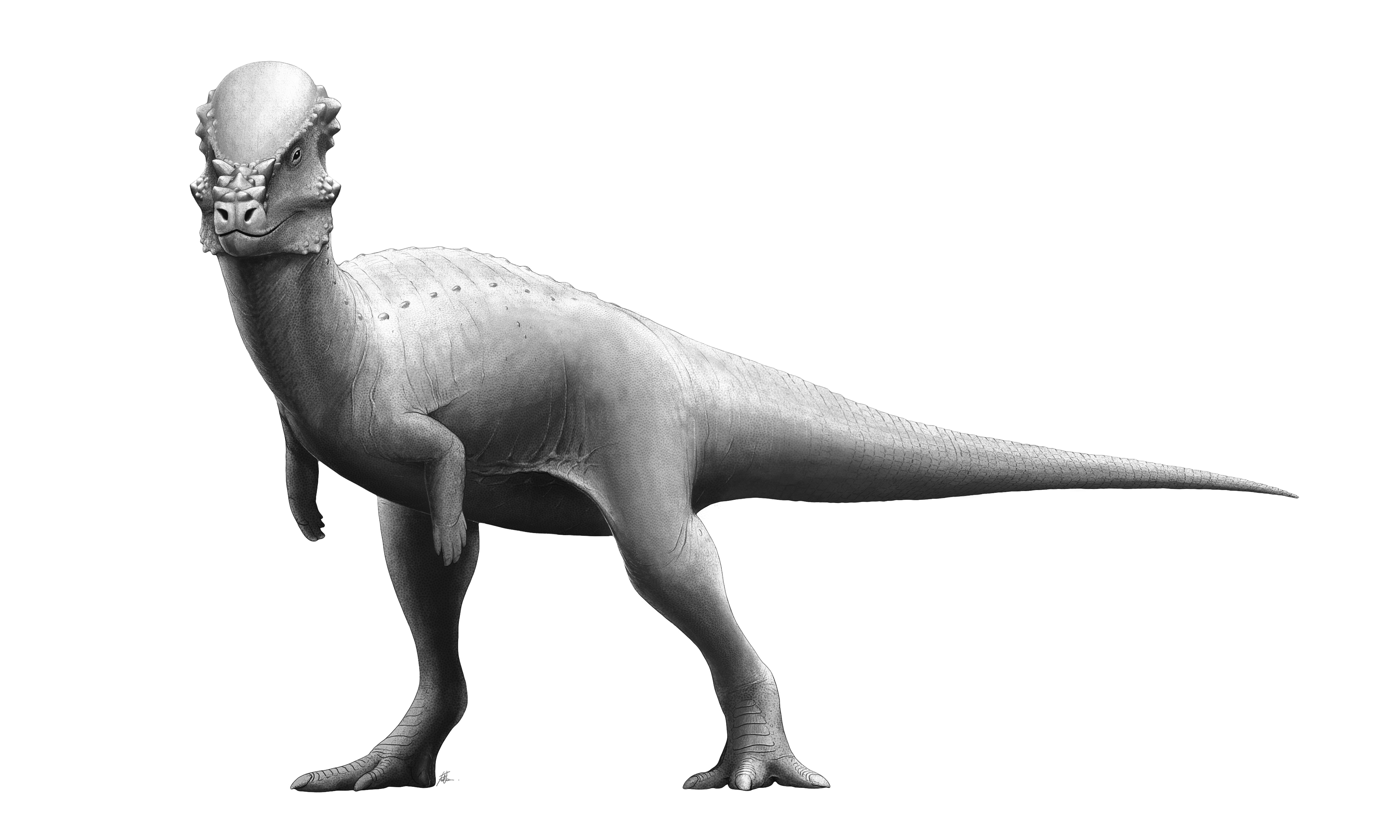
Illustration of Pachycephalosaurus wyomingensis

The anatomy of Pachycephalosaurus itself is poorly known, as only skull remains have been described. Pachycephalosaurus is famous for having a large, bony dome on top of its skull, up to 25 cm (10 in) thick, which safely cushioned its brain. The dome's rear aspect was edged with bony knobs and short bony spikes projected upwards from the snout. However, the spikes were probably blunted, not sharp.

The skull was short and possessed large, rounded eye sockets that faced forward, suggesting that the animal had binocular vision. Pachycephalosaurus had a small muzzle that ended in a pointed beak. The teeth were tiny, with leaf-shaped crowns. The head was supported by an S- or U-shaped neck. Younger individuals of Pachycephalosaurus might have had flatter skulls and larger horns projecting from the back of the skull. As the animal grew, the horns shrunk and rounded out as the dome grew.

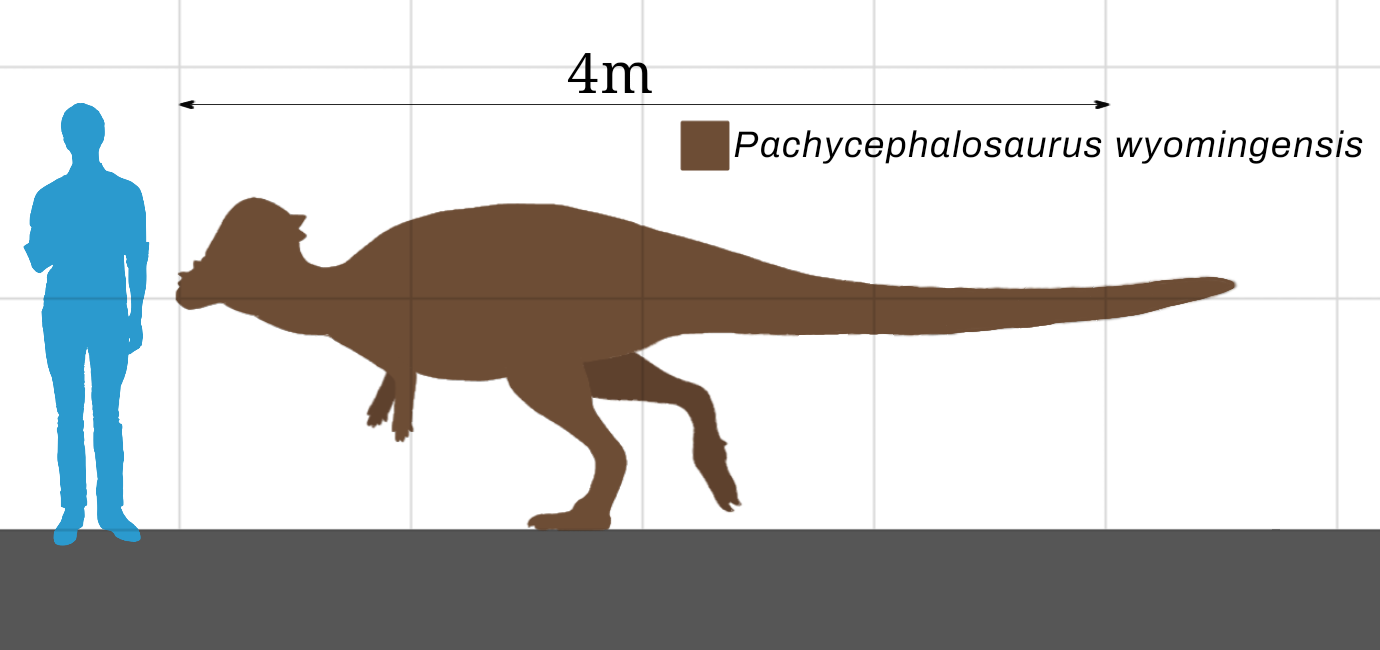
Size compared to a human

Pachycephalosaurus was bipedal and possibly the largest of all pachycephalosaurids. It has been estimated that Pachycephalosaurus was about 4.5 metres (14.8 ft) long and weighed about 370–450 kilograms (820–990 lb). Based on other pachycephalosaurids, it probably had a fairly short, thick neck, short arms, a bulky body, long legs, and a heavy tail that was likely held rigid by ossified tendons.

== Classification and species ==
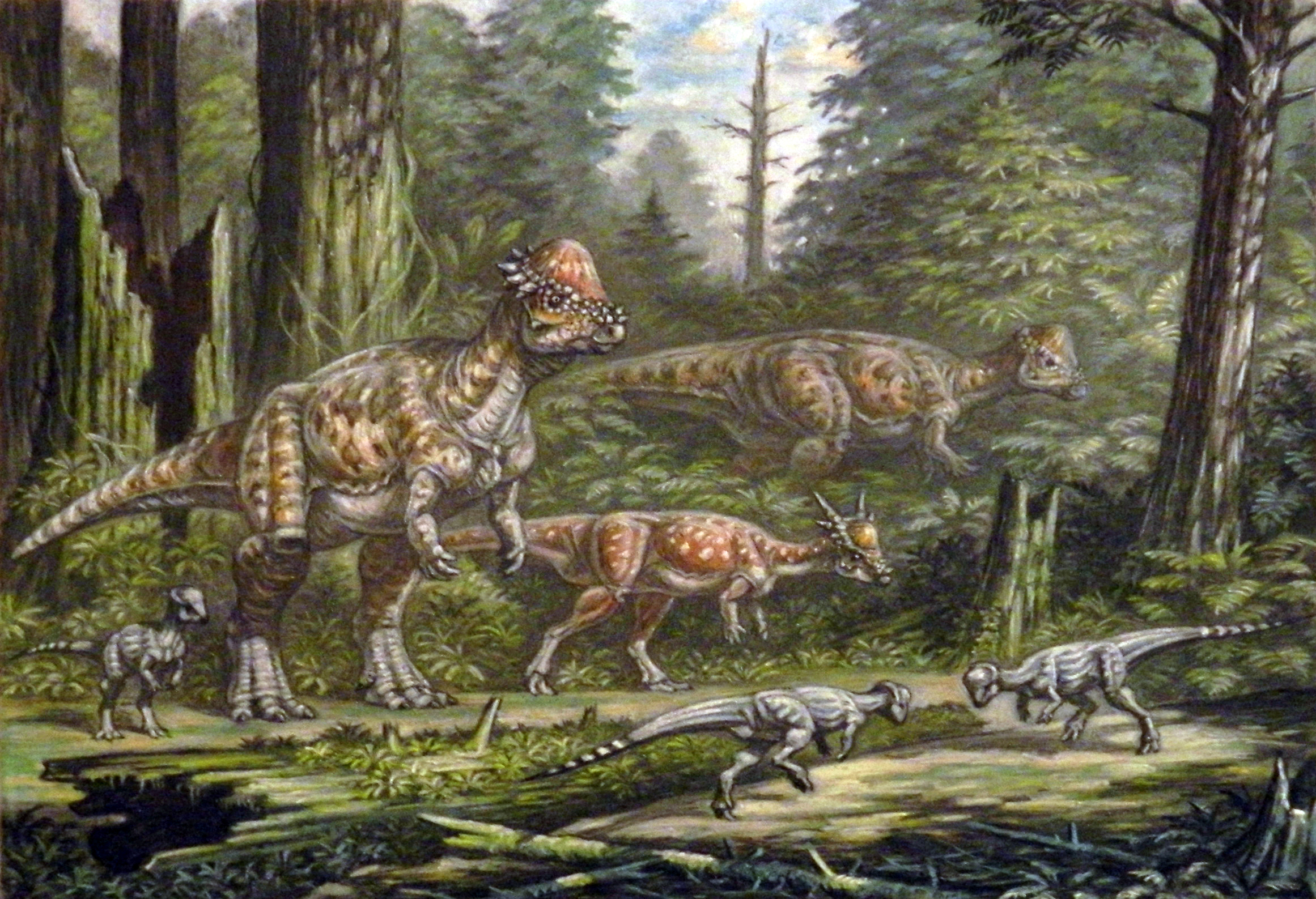
Several pachycephalosaur relatives discovered from Hell Creek

Pachycephalosaurus gives its name to Pachycephalosauria, a clade of herbivorous ornithischian dinosaurs that lived during the Late Cretaceous period in North America and Asia. Pachycephalosaurs were a part of Marginocephalia, thus being likely more closely related to the ceratopsians than the ornithopods.

Pachycephalosaurus is the most famous member of Pachycephalosauria, even if it is not the best-preserved member. The clade also includes various genera including Stenopelix, Wannanosaurus, Goyocephale, Stegoceras, Homalocephale, Tylocephale, Sphaerotholus, and Prenocephale. In 2009, Horenr and Goodwin proposed that Stygimoloch and Dracorex represent younger growth stages of Pachycephalosaurus, and thus should be classified as junior synonyms.

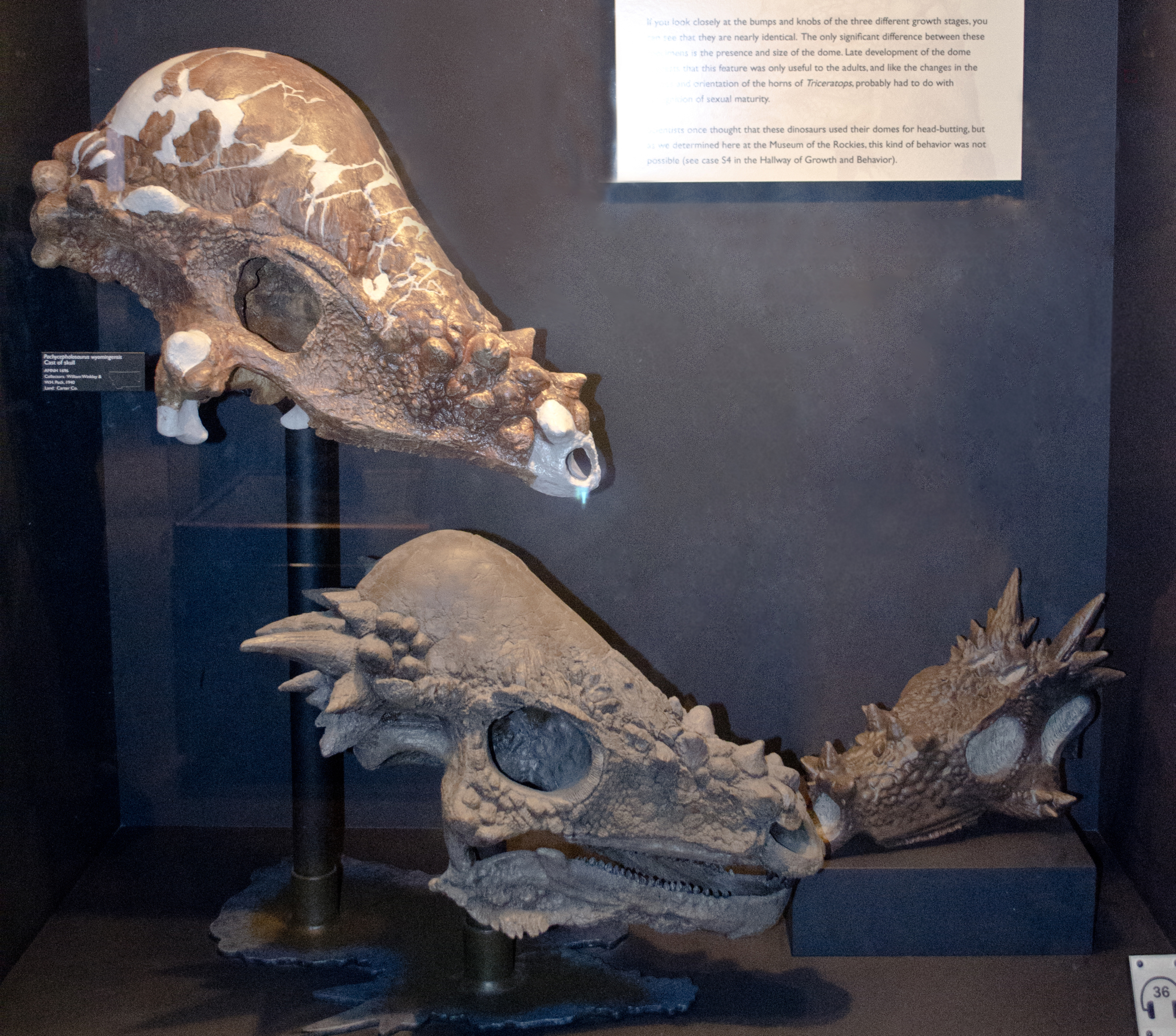
Casts of three skulls, representing possible growth stages, Museum of the Rockies

In 2010, Gregory S. Paul proposed that, while Stygimoloch and Dracorex possibly represent different growth stages of Pachycephalosaurus, Stygimoloch might represent a different species, P. spinifer. In his supplementary material of a 2017 paper, Fowler noted that Stygimoloch is only known from younger rock layers than Pachycephalosaurus, so he tentatively classified both to be separate, though Dracorex was included as a synonym of either taxa. A 2021 phylogenetic analysis by Evans and colleagues accepted the validity of the genus Stygimoloch based on the same reason as Fowler (2017), but agreed with the consensus that Dracorex represents an ontogimorph of either Stygimoloch or Pachycephalosaurus instead of a distinct taxon. In 2025, Wroblewski treated Stygimoloch as a separate genus to which he attributed three specimens from the Ferris Formation, providing further evidence that this taxon was restricted to the uppermost Maastrichtian, but agreed with the consensus that Dracorex is morphologically identical to Stygimoloch (or Pachycephalosaurus).

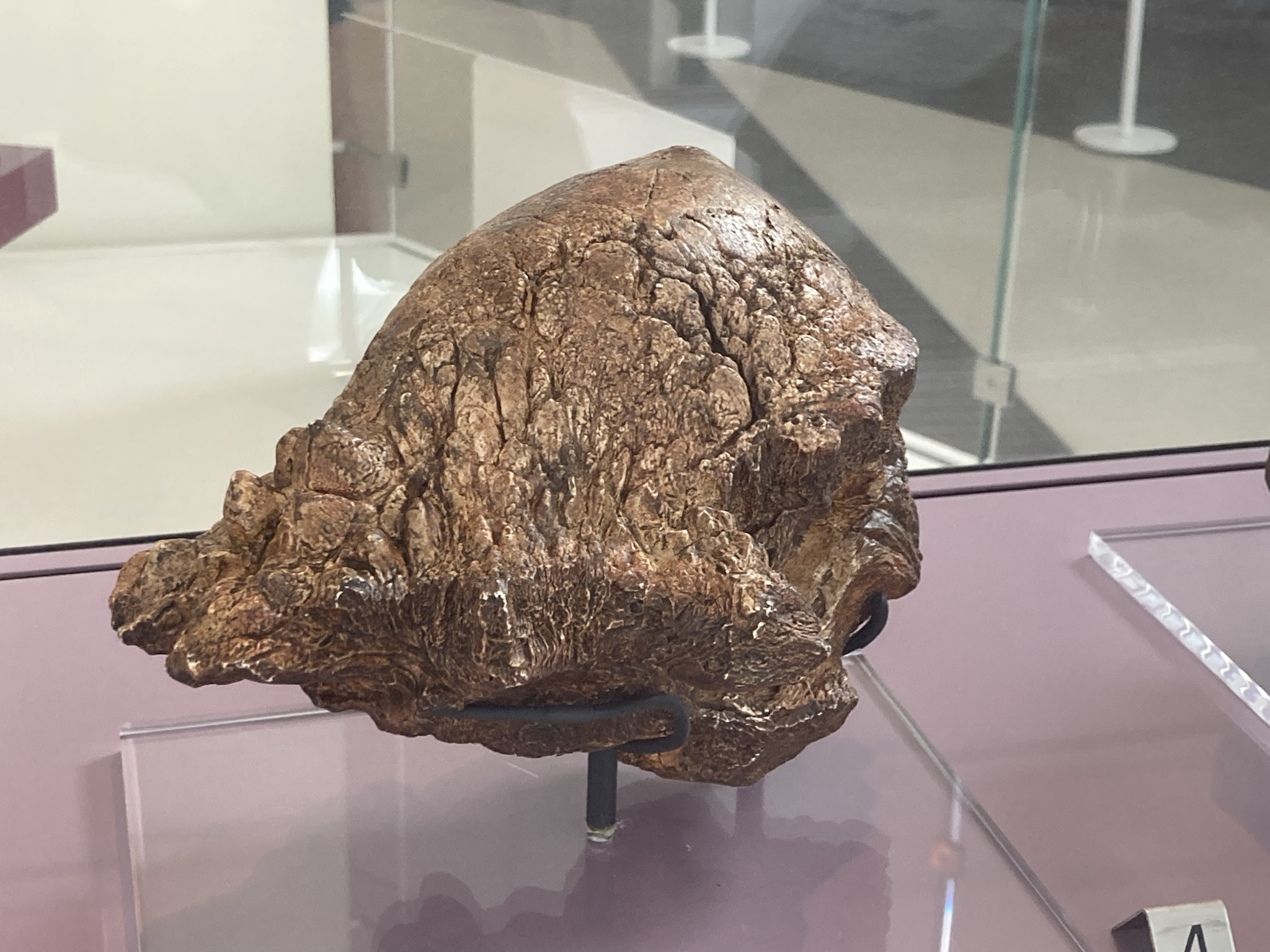
Cast of skull MPN 7111 originally named as "Stenotholus"

Phylogenetic analyses by Evans and colleagues have been used to resolve the relationships within Pachycephalosauridae, consistently finding Pachycephalosaurus as one of the most derived taxa closer to Prenocephale and Sphaerotholus than Stegoceras. The version of the analysis published by Woodruff and colleagues in 2023 is below.

- Pachycephalosauria
  - Wannanosaurus
  - - Pachycephalosauridae
      - - Hanssuesia
        - Colepiocephale
        - Stegoceras validum
        - Stegoceras novomexicanum
      - - Pachycephalosaurinae
          - Goyocephale
          - - Homalocephale
            - - Tylocephale
              - - Foraminacephale
                - - Amtocephale
                  - - Acrotholus
                    - Prenocephale
                    - - Alaskacephale
                      - - Pachycephalosaurini
                          - Stygimoloch
                          - Pachycephalosaurus
                      - - Sphaerotholus
                          - S. goodwini
                          - S. lyonsi
                          - S. triregnum
                          - - S. buchholtzae
                            - S. edmontonensis

== Paleobiology ==
=== Growth ===
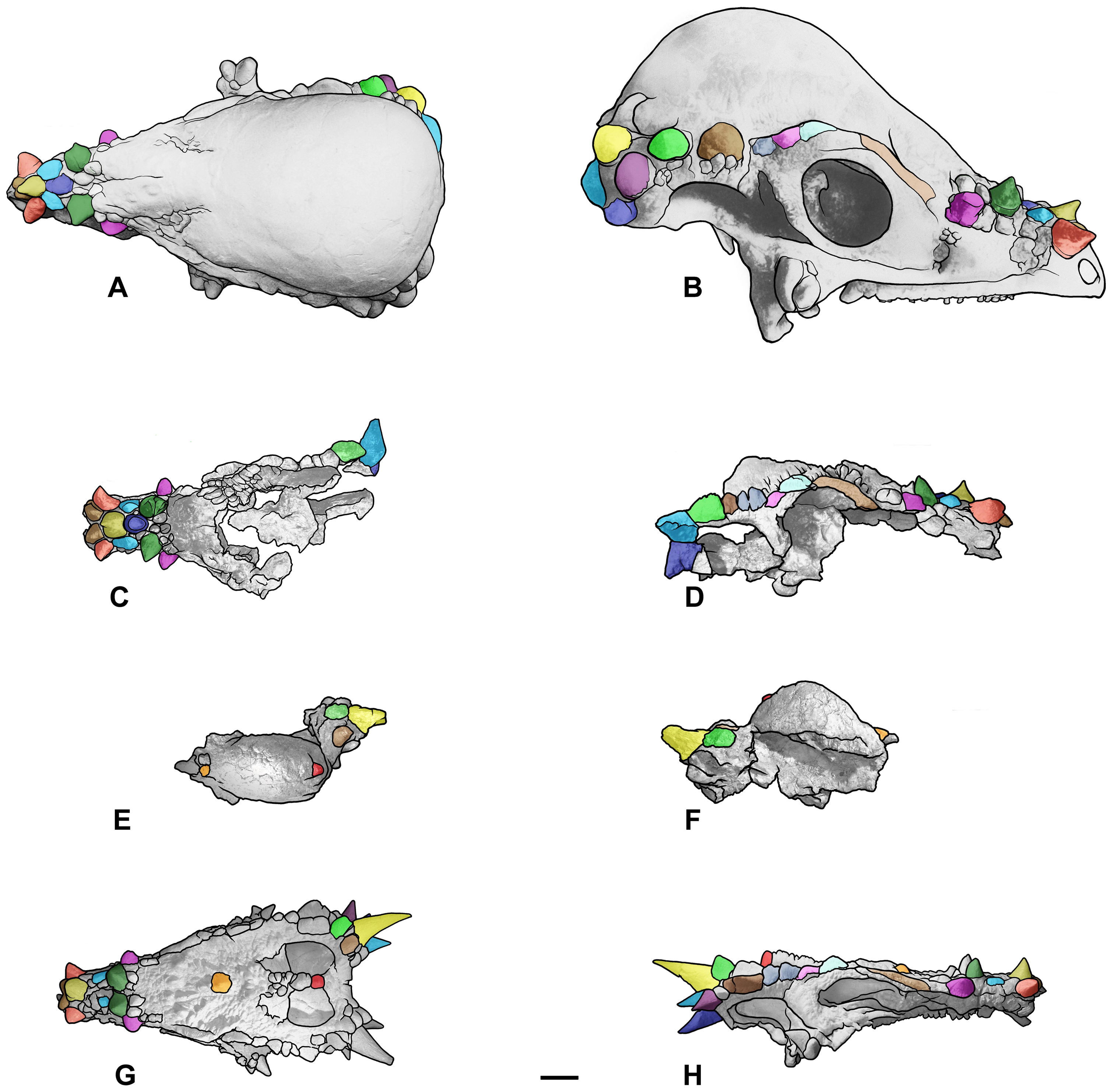
Growth series showing reduction of spikes and growth of dome with age, according to Horner and Goodwin

Aside from Pachycephalosaurus itself, two other pachycephalosaurs were described from the latest Cretaceous of the northwestern United States: Stygimoloch spinifer ("thorny Moloch of the Styx") and Dracorex hogwartsia ("dragon king of Hogwarts"). The former is only known from a juvenile skull with a reduced dome and large spikes, while the latter, also known from only a juvenile skull, had a seemingly flat head with short horns. Due to their unique head ornamentation, they were seen as separate species for a number of years. However, in 2007, they were proposed to be juvenile or female morphologies of Pachycephalosaurus. At that year's meeting of the Society of Vertebrate Paleontology, Jack Horner of Montana State University presented evidence, from analysis of the skull of the Dracorex specimen, that it may be a juvenile form of Stygimoloch. In addition to this, he presented data that indicates that both Stygimoloch and Dracorex may be juvenile forms of Pachycephalosaurus. Horner and M.B. Goodwin published their findings in 2009, showing that the spike and skull dome bones of all three "species" exhibit extreme plasticity and that both Dracorex and Stygimoloch are known only from juvenile specimens, while Pachycephalosaurus is known only from adult specimens. These observations, in addition to the fact that all three forms lived in the same time and place, led them to conclude that Dracorex and Stygimoloch were simply juvenile Pachycephalosaurus, which lost spikes and grew domes as they aged. A 2010 study by Nick Longrich and colleagues also supported the hypothesis that all flat-skulled pachycephalosaur species were juveniles of the dome-headed adults, such as Goyocephale and Homalocephale.

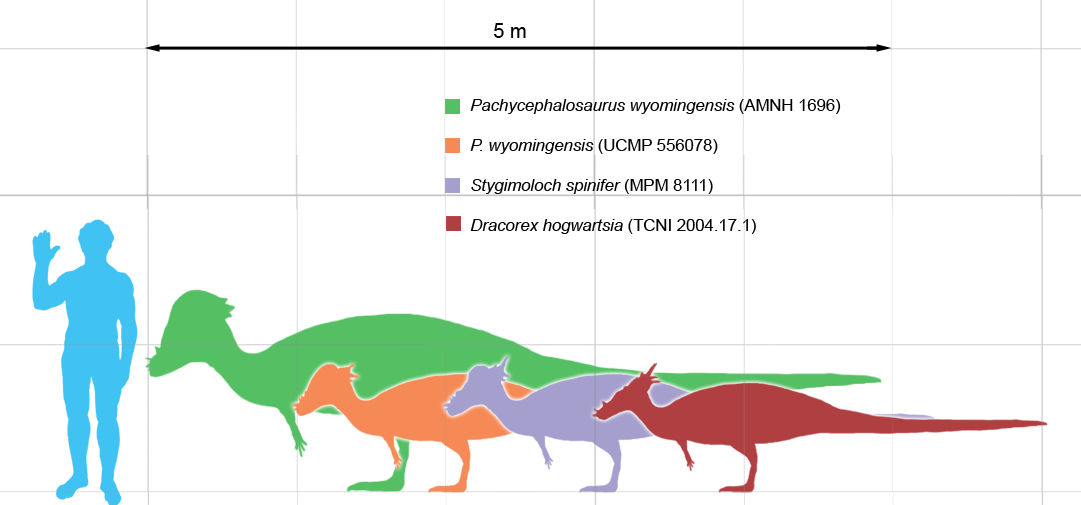
Size of an adult P. wyomingensis (green) and potential growth stages, compared to a human

The discovery of baby skulls assigned to Pachycephalosaurus that were described in 2016 from two different bone beds in the Hell Creek Formation has been presented as further evidence for this hypothesis. The fossils, as described by David Evans and Mark Goodwin et al. are identical to all three supposed genera in the placement of the rugose knobs on their skulls, and the unique features of Stygimoloch and Dracorex are thus instead morphologically consistent features on a Pachycephalosaurus growth curve.

It has been noted that morphological differences between Stygimoloch and Pachycephalosaurus may also partly be due to slight stratigraphic differences. The few Stygimoloch specimens that have reliable stratigraphic data were all collected from the upper part of the Hell Creek Formation, whereas Pachycephalosaurus morphs were all collected from the lower part. This has also led to suggestions that Stygimoloch might represent its own species, P. spinifer, or a distinct genus.

=== Dome function ===
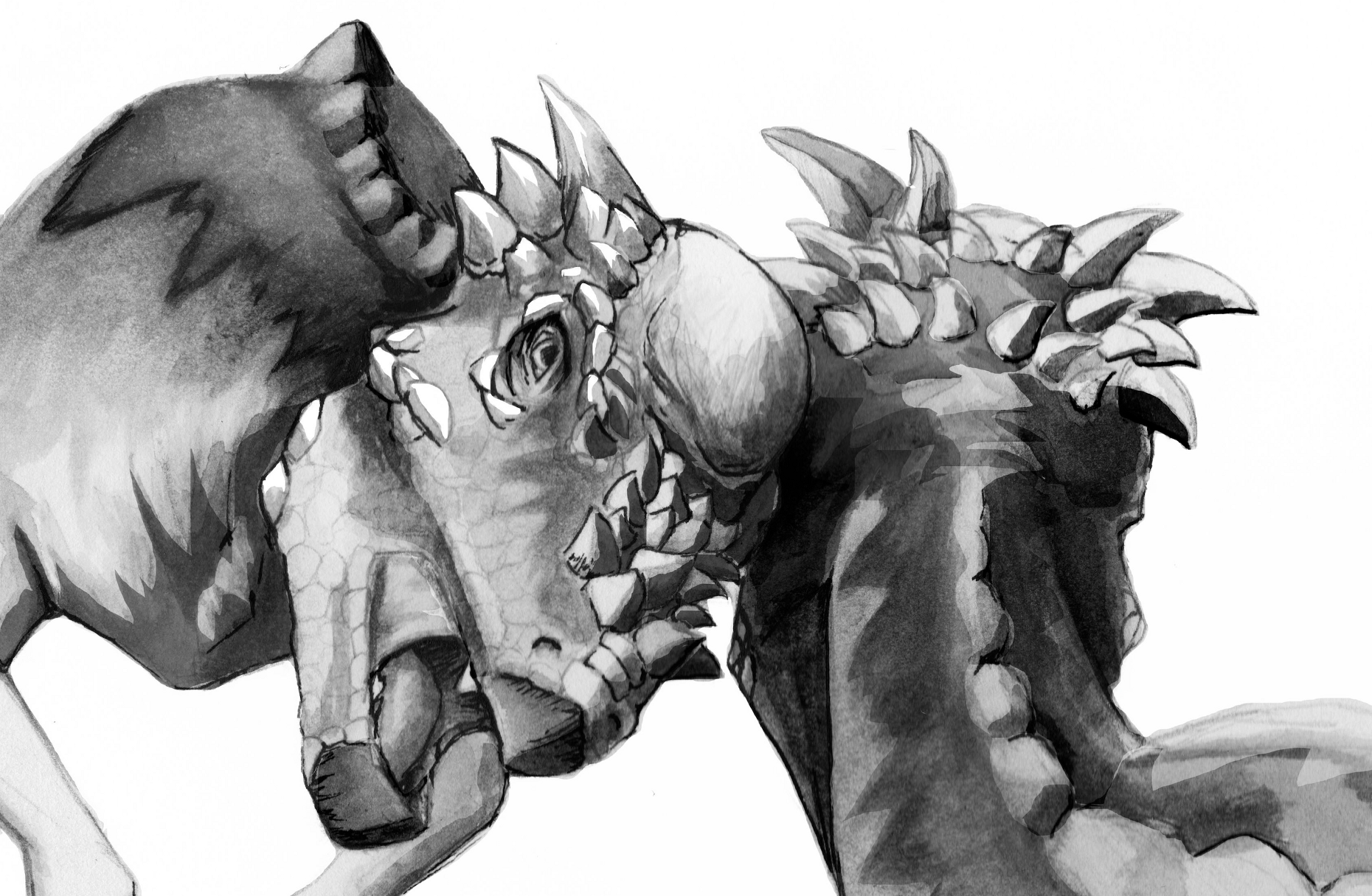
Paleoart of head-butting subadults

It has been widely hypothesized for decades that Pachycephalosaurus and its relatives were the ancient, bipedal equivalents of bighorn sheep or musk oxen, where male individuals would ram each other headlong and that they would horizontally straighten their head, neck, and body in order to transmit stress during ramming. However, there have also been alternative suggestions that the pachycephalosaurs could not have used their domes in this way.

The primary argument that has been raised against head-butting is that the skull roof may not have adequately sustained impact associated with ramming, as well as a lack of definitive evidence of scars or other damage on fossilized Pachycephalosaurus skulls. However, more recent analyses have uncovered such damage (see below). Furthermore, the cervical and anterior dorsal vertebrae show that the neck was carried in an S- or U-shaped curve, rather than a straight orientation and that it might have been unfit for transmitting stress from direct head-butting. Lastly, the rounded shape of the skull would lessen the contacted surface area during head-butting, resulting in glancing blows.

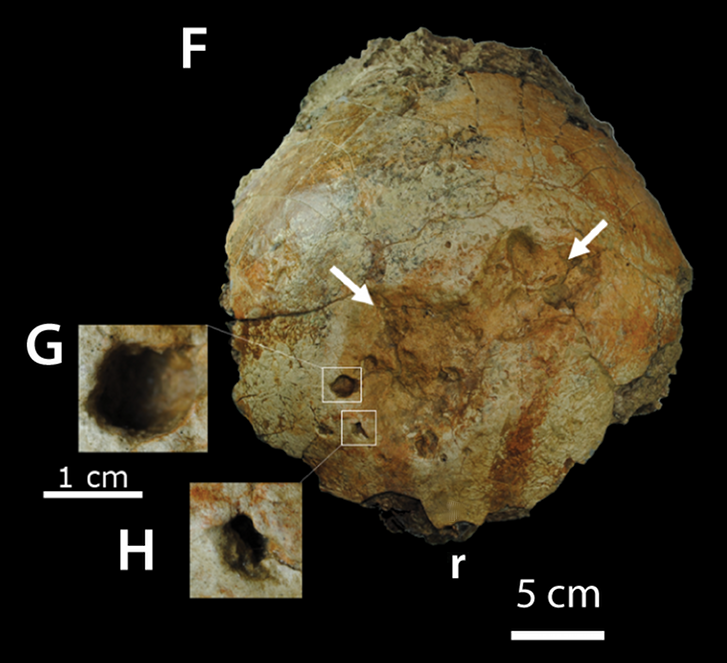
Depressions on the skull of specimen BMRP 2001.4.1

Alternatively, Pachycephalosaurus and other pachycephalosaurids may have engaged in flank-butting during intraspecific combat. In this scenario, an individual may have stood roughly parallel or faced a rival directly, using intimidation displays to cow its rival. If intimidation failed, the Pachycephalosaurus would bend its head downward and to the side, striking the rival on its flank. This hypothesis is supported by the relatively broad torso of most pachycephalosaurs, which would have protected vital organs from trauma. The flank-butting theory was first proposed by Sues in 1978 and expanded upon by Ken Carpenter in 1997.

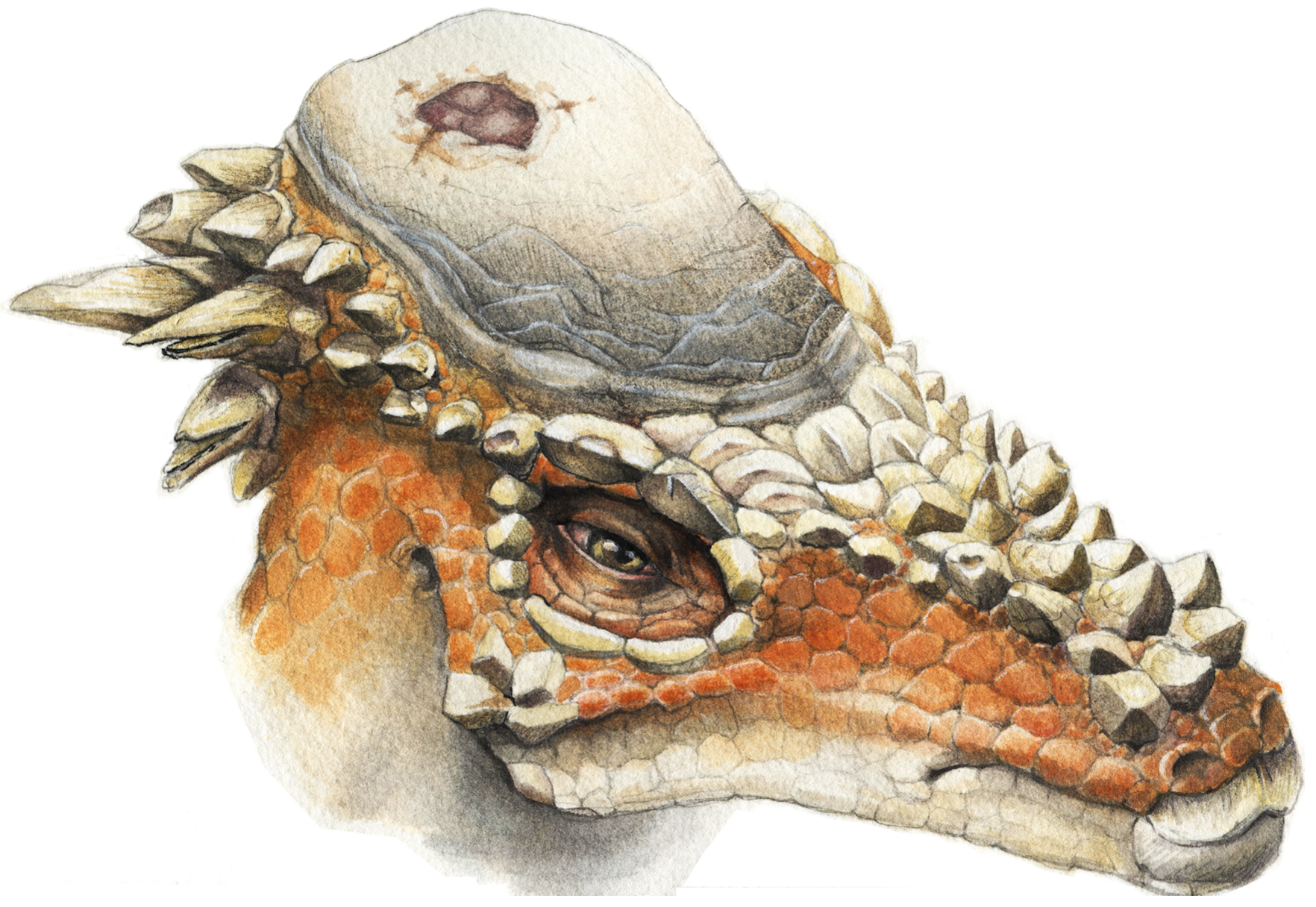
Restoration of a specimen with a cranial lesion

In 2012, a study showed that cranial pathologies in a P. wyomingensis specimen were likely due to agonistic behavior. It was also proposed that similar damage in other pachycephalosaur specimens (previously explained as taphonomic artifacts and bone absorptions) may instead have been due to such behavior. Peterson et al. (2013) studied cranial pathologies among Pachycephalosauridae and found that 22% of all domes examined had lesions that are consistent with osteomyelitis, an infection of the bone resulting from penetrating trauma or trauma to the tissue overlying the skull that lead to an infection of the bone tissue. This high rate of pathology lends more support to the hypothesis that pachycephalosaurid domes were employed in intra-specific combat. Pachycephalosaurus wyomingensis specimen BMR P2001.4.5 was observed to have 23 lesions in its frontal bone and P. wyomingensis specimen DMNS 469 was observed to have five lesions. The frequency of trauma was comparable across the different genera in the pachycephalosaurid family, despite the fact that these genera vary with respect to the size and architecture of their domes and the fact that they existed during varying geologic periods. These findings were in stark contrast with the results from analysis of the relatively flat-headed pachycephalosaurids, where there was an absence of pathology. This would support the hypothesis that these individuals represent either females or juveniles, where intra-specific combat behavior is not expected.

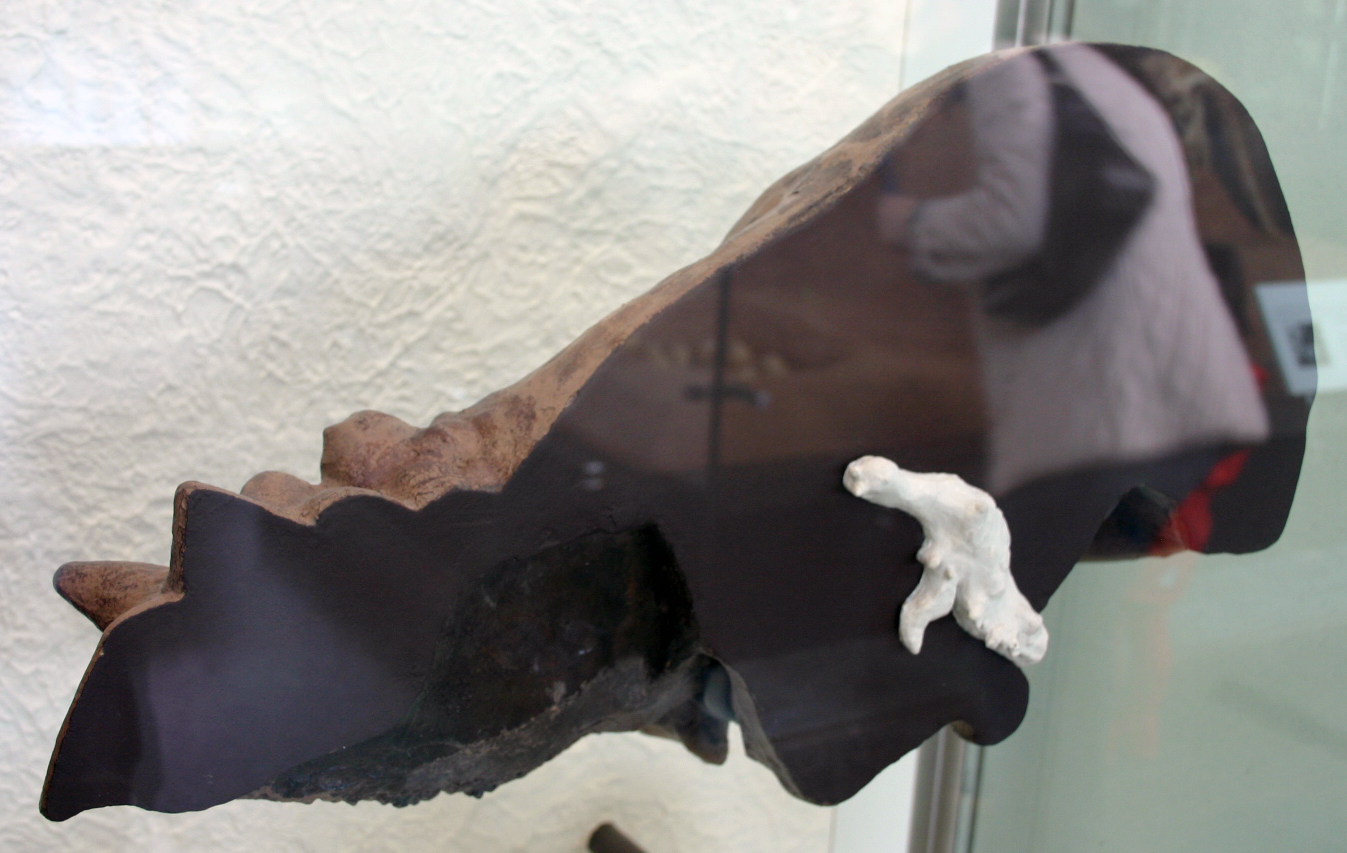
Brain endocast shown in relation to the skull

Histological examination reveals that pachycephalosaurid domes are composed of a unique form of fibrolamellar bone that contains fibroblasts, which play a critical role in wound healing and are capable of rapidly depositing bone during remodeling. Peterson et al. (2013) concluded that, taken together, the frequency of lesion distribution and the bone structure of frontoparietal domes lends strong support to the hypothesis that pachycephalosaurids used their unique cranial structures for agonistic behavior. CT scan comparisons of the skulls of Stegoceras validum, Prenocephale prenes, and several head-striking artiodactyls have also supported pachycephalosaurids as being well-equipped for head-butting. Micro-CT scans of the pachycephalosaurid specimen, identified as cf. Foraminacephale brevis, also support that pachycephalosaurids likely engaged in head-butting.

Research headed by paleontologist Cary Woodruff noted that Pachycephalosaurus's spine, pelvis and tail share resemblances to kangaroos over headbutting animals like bighorn sheep. Woodruff proposes that pachycephalosaurs were potentially capable of 'kickboxing' behavior like kangaroos, though potentially also using their domes for shoving matches.

=== Diet ===
Scientists do not yet know what these dinosaurs ate. Having very small, ridged teeth, they could not have chewed tough, fibrous plants like flowering shrubs as effectively as other dinosaurs of the same period. It is assumed that pachycephalosaurs lived on a mixed diet of leaves, seeds, and fruits. The sharp, serrated teeth would have been very effective for shredding plants. It has also been suspected to a degree that it may have included meat in its diet. The most complete fossil jaw shows that it had serrated blade-like front teeth, reminiscent of those of carnivorous theropods.

== Paleoecology ==
Nearly all Pachycephalosaurus fossils have been recovered from the Lance Formation and Hell Creek Formation of the northwestern United States. Pachycephalosaurus possibly coexisted alongside additional pachycephalosaur species of the genera Sphaerotholus. Other dinosaurs that shared its time and place include Thescelosaurus, the hadrosaurid Edmontosaurus and possibly Parasaurolophus, ceratopsians like Triceratops, Torosaurus, Nedoceratops, Tatankaceratops, and Leptoceratops, the ankylosaurid Ankylosaurus, the nodosaurids Denversaurus and Edmontonia, and the theropods Acheroraptor, Dakotaraptor, Ornithomimus, Struthiomimus, Anzu, Leptorhynchos, Pectinodon, Paronychodon, Richardoestesia, Nanotyrannus, and Tyrannosaurus.

== See also ==
- Timeline of pachycephalosaur research
