= Sandra Steingraber =

American biologist and author

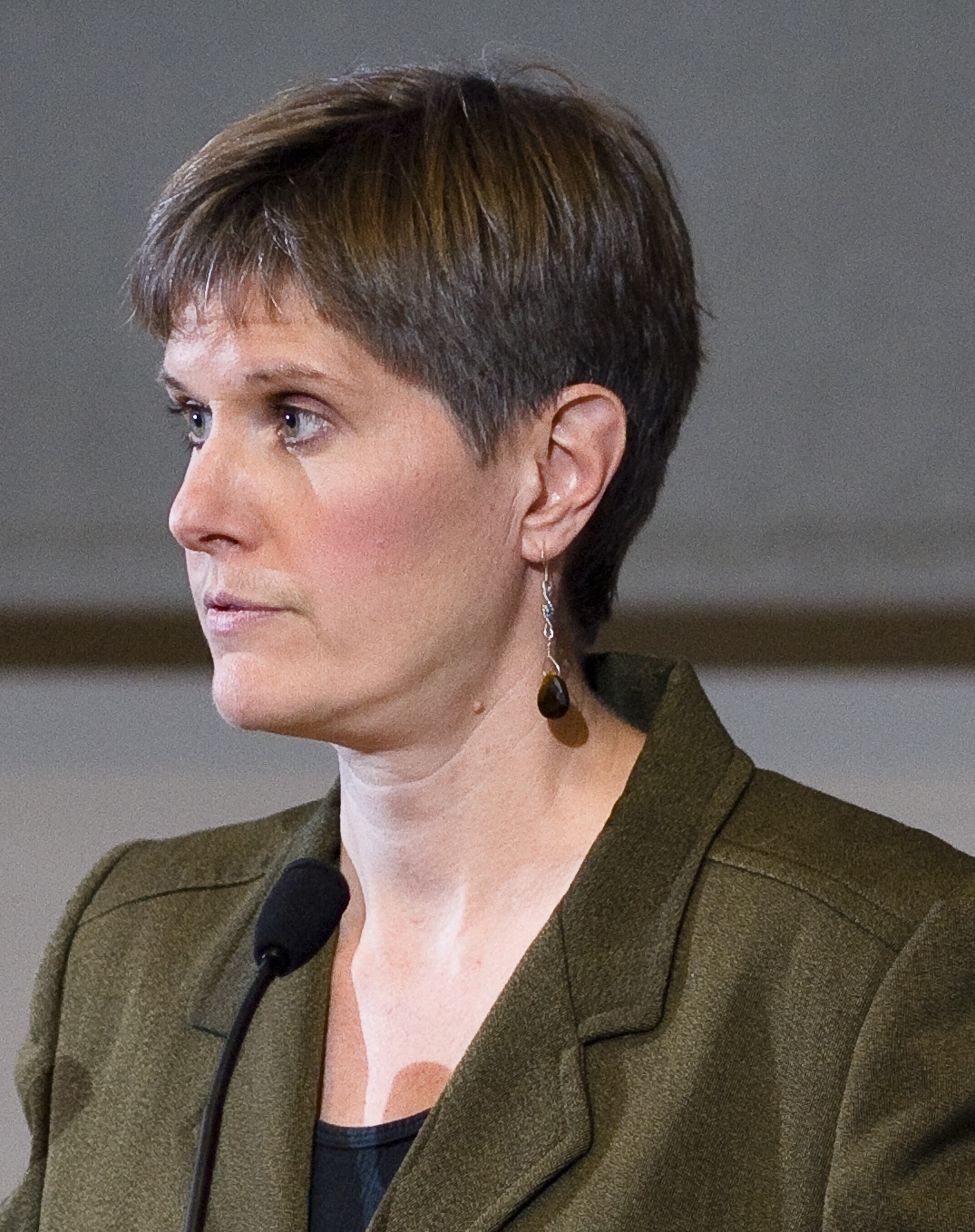
- Steingraber in 2008
- Born: 1959 (age 66–67); Tazewell County, Illinois, United States
- Education: University of Michigan
- Occupations: Biologist, science writer
- Writing career
- Period: 1996–present
- Subjects: Ecology, cancer, fertility, pregnancy, toxicology
- Notable work: Living Downstream
- Website: steingraber.com

Sandra Steingraber (born 1959) is an American biologist, author, and cancer survivor. Steingraber writes and lectures on the environmental factors that contribute to reproductive health problems and environmental links to cancer.

== Early life ==
Steingraber was adopted as an infant. She grew up and spent most of her childhood in Tazewell County, Illinois. Her mother was a microbiologist and her father was a community college professor. Her parents inculcated in her an interest in sustainable development and organic agriculture from a young age.

In her 20s, Steingraber developed bladder cancer. In several of her books, she describes an apparent cancer cluster in her hometown and within her family.

After her cancer went into remission, Steingraber completed her undergraduate degree in biology from Illinois Wesleyan University. She worked for several years as a field researcher, eventually earning her doctorate in biology from the University of Michigan. Steingraber also holds a master's degree in English from Illinois State University.

== Career ==
Steingraber has been on faculty at Cornell University, and is a Distinguished Visiting Scholar at the Division of Interdisciplinary and International Studies at Ithaca College, in Ithaca, New York. She held visiting fellowships at the University of Illinois, Radcliffe/Harvard, and Northeastern University, and served on President Bill Clinton's National Action Plan on Breast Cancer.

== Activism ==
=== Living Downstream ===
In her 1997 book, Living Downstream, Steingraber blends anecdotes and descriptions of industrial and agricultural pollution with data from scientific and medical literature to assess the relationship between environmental factors and cancer. Steingraber criticizes the imbalance between funding devoted to studies of genetic predisposition to cancer versus studies of environmental contributions. The book claims that while we can do little to change our genetic inheritance, much can be done to reduce human exposure to environmental carcinogens.

Her work Living Downstream: An Ecologist Looks at Cancer and the Environment, reflects the ideals that Rachel Carson expressed in her seminal book, Silent Spring. Carson discusses a woman with bladder cancer and investigates research on how and why cancer is linked to the environment. Steingraber stresses issues such as how chemical pesticides find their way into human bodies. She states, "in 1996 a study investigated six-fold excess of bladder cancer among workers exposed years before to o-toluidine and aniline in the rubber chemicals department of a manufacturing plant in upstate New York. Levels of these contaminants are now well within their legal workplace limits and yet blood and urine samples collected from current employees were found to contain substantial numbers of DNA adducts and detectable levels of o-toluidine and aniline."

"To the 89 percent of Illinois that is farmland, an estimated 54 million pounds of synthetic pesticides are applied each year. Introduced into Illinois at the end of World War II, these chemical poisons quietly familiarized themselves with the landscape. In 1950, less than 10 percent of cornfields were sprayed with pesticides. In 1993, 99 percent were chemically treated," (page 5).

Living Downstream is the basis for a documentary by The People's Picture Company that chronicles Steingraber's struggles as a cancer survivor and her contributions as an ecologist and cancer prevention activist.

On March 18, 2013, Steingraber was arrested along with nine other protesters for blocking the entrance to the Inergy natural gas facility near Ithaca to protest "the industrialization of the Finger Lakes." After refusing to pay a fine, Steingraber and two other members of the "Seneca Lake 12" received 15-day sentences. Steingraber served 10 days in the Chemung County jail in the city of Elmira before her release.

On October 29, 2014, while participating in the civil disobedience campaign, called We Are Seneca Lake, Steingraber was arrested again with nine other protestors at the gates of Crestwood Midstream (formerly Inergy) for trespassing and blocking a chemical truck, which resulted in an additional charge of disorderly conduct. On November 19, in the Town of Reading Court, she was sentenced to 15-days in jail after refusing to pay her fine. She served 8-days in the Chemung County jail and was released. Steingraber detailed her experience in an Ecowatch article, "Why I am in Jail."

=== Unfractured ===
Steingraber was the subject of the 2018 documentary, Unfractured.

== Personal life ==
Steingraber lives in Trumansburg, New York with her husband Jeff de Castro, a sculptor and art restoration specialist, with their two children. In July 2019, Sandra Steingraber announced in an essay that she was gay, timing her announcement to coincide with LGBT STEM day.

== Bibliography ==
- The Spoils of Famine: Ethiopian Famine Policy and Peasant Agriculture (Cultural Survival Report 25) (1988, co-author), which raised issues of ecology and human rights in Africa.
- Post-diagnosis (1995), a volume of poetry on living with cancer.
- Living Downstream: An Ecologist Looks at Cancer and the Environment (1997), which proposed a relationship between cancer registry data and Toxics Release Inventory data.
- Having Faith: An Ecologist's Journey to Motherhood (2001), which explored fetal toxicology and genetics with respect to Steingraber's own pregnancy.
- The Falling Age of Puberty in U.S. Girls: what we know, what we need to know (2007), which reviews the epidemiology and etiology of the acceleration of puberty among girls in the USA.
- Raising Elijah: Protecting Our Children in an Age of Environmental Crisis (2011, Merloyd Lawrence Books) ISBN 978-0-7382-1399-6

== Awards and honors ==
- 1997 – Named a Ms. Magazine Woman of the Year.
- 1998 – First annual Altman Award for "the inspiring and poetic use of science to elucidate the causes of cancer," from the Jenifer Altman Foundation
- 1998 – Will Solimene Award for "excellence in medical communication" from the New England chapter of the American Medical Writers Association.
- 1999 – Sierra Club heralded Steingraber as "the new Rachel Carson."
- 2001 – Biennial Rachel Carson Leadership Award from Chatham College, Rachel Carson's alma mater.
- 2006 – Received the Breast Cancer Fund's "Hero Award" along with Teresa Heinz Kerry. In recognition to honor and publicly thank those who have significantly helped advance our mission to identify and eliminate the environmental—and preventable—causes of breast cancer.
- 2008 – Honorary Doctor of Letters (D.Litt.) awarded by Lycoming College, Williamsport, PA, in recognition of excellence in research and writing.
- 2010 – Named one of the "25 Visionaries Who Are Changing Your World" by Utne Reader magazine.
- 2012 – Received the 17th Annual Heinz Award with special focus on the environment
- 2013 – Received the Doctor of Humane Letters honorary degree. award by SUNY college of Environmental Science & Forestry
- 2015 – Received the American Ethical Union's Elliott-Black Award "for protecting our planet and informing others on how to get active ..."
- 2015 - Received Breast Cancer Action's "Barbara Brenner Hell Raiser Award" for shining "a light on the links between toxic chemicals and breast cancer" and for bringing her "academic knowledge to the real world through political advocacy and direct action."
