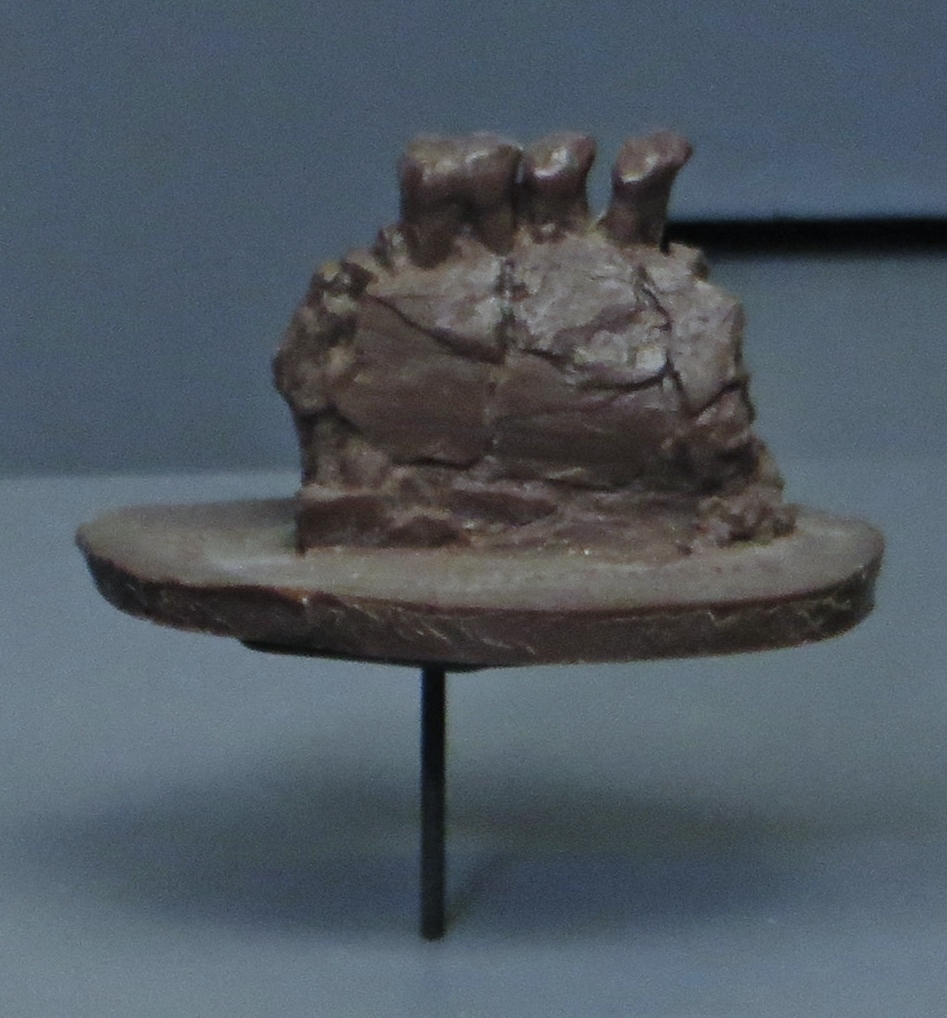
- Case of mandible

Scientific classification
- Kingdom: Animalia
- Phylum: Chordata
- Class: Mammalia
- Infraclass: Placentalia
- Order: Primates
- Family: †Amphipithecidae
- Genus: †Amphipithecus; Colbert, 1937
- Species: †A. mogaungensis

Binomial name
- †Amphipithecus mogaungensis Colbert, 1937

= Amphipithecus =

Amphipithecus Temporal range: 41.3–37.8 Ma Bartonian

Extinct genus of primates

Amphipithecus mogaungensis ("ape-like creature of Mogaung", derived from the Ancient Greek ἀμφί, amphi- meaning "around" and pithēkos, pithecus meaning "ape") was a primate that lived in Late Eocene Myanmar. Along with another primate Pondaungia cotteri, both are difficult to categorise within the order Primates. What little is known suggests that they are neither adapiform nor omomyid primates, two of the earliest primate groups to appear in the fossil record. Deep mandibles and mandibular molars with low, broad crowns suggest they are both simians, a group that includes monkeys, apes, and humans, though more material is needed for further comparison. The teeth also suggest that these were frugivore primates, with a body mass of 6–10 kg (13–22 lb).

== Discovery ==
In early 1923, notable fossil prospector Barnum Brown (famed for discovering the first Tyrannosaurus rex skeleton) traveled with his wife Lilian Brown to Yangon, the capital of Myanmar. Brown focused his fossil prospecting along areas of Pondaung Sandstone. In the outskirts of Mogaung town, he identified a mandible with three teeth (right). He did not recognise the significance of his find until 14 years later, when Edwin H. Colbert identified the fossil as a new species of primate and the earliest known anthropoid in the world.
