= Seymour Lawrence =

20th century American publisher

Seymour Lawrence (1926–1994) was an American publisher, first with the Atlantic Monthly Press, and later with his own imprint, Seymour Lawrence, Inc.

== Early life and career ==
Seymour Lawrence was born on 11 February 1926 in New York City, to Jack and Sophie L. Lawrence. He attended Harvard University, where he was the editor of the literary magazine Wake, and graduated in 1948. He worked briefly as a representative for the Van Nostrand Company before joining the Atlantic Monthly Press in 1950. By 1952, he had reached the rank of associate editor. In 1964, he joined Alfred A. Knopf Inc. as editorial vice president.

In 1965, he launched his own imprint, Seymour Lawrence, Inc. The imprint operated as a division of Dell Publishing for seventeen years, until Dell declined to re-new their co-publishing agreement. Lawrence's imprint moved to E. P. Dutton from 1982 to 1988, and in 1988 became a division of Houghton Mifflin.

As a publisher, he was known for his work with a number of distinguished authors, including four Nobel Prize winners: Miguel Ángel Asturias, Camilo José Cela, Pablo Neruda, and George Seferis. He is credited with discovering a number of notable American authors, including Katherine Anne Porter, Kurt Vonnegut, Richard Brautigan, Richard Ford, and Joseph Heller; he published Ship of Fools, Trout Fishing in America, and Slaughterhouse-Five, among others. He was "passionately committed to writers and writing"; Vonnegut described him as "a very good scout of talent".

== Personal life ==
Lawrence lived in Connecticut for most of his life. He was married to Merloyd Ludington, with whom he had a son and a daughter, from 1952 to their divorce in 1985. In the year before the divorce, she created her own imprint, Merloyd Lawrence Books.

In his later years, he lived with writer Joan Williams.

His friendship with Barry Hannah, one of the authors he discovered, led him to purchase a home in Oxford, Mississippi. After his death, his collection of American art was donated to the University of Mississippi Museum.

Lawrence died on 24 January 1994 in Englewood, Florida of complications from a heart attack.

== See also ==
- Seymour Lawrence Books
