= Joan Williams (author) =

American author (1928–2004)

Joan Williams (September 26, 1928 – April 11, 2004) was an American author.

== Early life ==
Williams was born on September 26, 1928, in Memphis, Tennessee. She attended Southwestern University and Chevy Chase Junior College, graduating from Bard College in 1950. She later met William Faulkner, having a five-year relationship with him.

== Writing career ==
Williams published her first stories while a student at Bard College. "Rain Later" received the College Fiction Prize from Mademoiselle, and four years later, she published a sequel in the same venue. These two stories together formed the nucleus of her first novel, "The Morning and the Evening", whose publication led novelist William Styron to call Williams a "greatly gifted writer".

== Personal life ==
Williams and Faulkner's relationship was both personal and professional, but Williams never found the personal part of it satisfying: correspondence between the two writers shows Faulkner's ongoing frustration with Williams' ambivalence. In 1954, she married sportswriter and editor Ezra Bowen, whose mother was biographer Catherine Drinker Bowen. Williams and Bowen had two sons and three grand-daughters. From 1984 to 1994, she lived with Atlantic editor Seymour Lawrence, who had accepted a story of hers in 1952. She died on April 11, 2004, in Atlanta.

== Works ==
=== Books ===
- The Morning and the Evening (New York: Atheneum, 1961)
- Old Powder Man (New York: Harcourt, Brace & World, 1966)
- The Wintering (New York: Harcourt Brace Jovanovich,1971)
- Country Woman (Boston: Little, Brown, 1982)
- Pariah and Other Stories (Boston: Little, Brown, 1983)
- Pay the Piper (New York: E.P. Dutton, 1988)

=== Short stories ===
- "Rain Later," Mademoiselle (August 1949)
- "The Morning and the Evening," The Atlantic (January 1952)
- "No Love for the Lonely," The Saturday Evening Post (January 19, 1963)
- "Going Ahead," The Saturday Evening Post (December 12, 1964)
- "Pariah," McCall's (August 1967)
- "Spring Is Now," Virginia Quarterly Review 44.4 (Autumn 1968)
- "Jesse," Esquire (November 1969)
- "Vistas" aka "An Invitation to Lunch," Westport News
- "The Sound of Silence", Pariah and Other Stories (1983)
- "Daylight Come", Pariah and Other Stories (1983)
- "Scoot," Key West Review (1989)
- "The Contest," The Chattahoochee Review 15.4 (Summer 1995)
- "Happy Anniversary," The Southern Review 31.4 (Autumn 1995)

=== Non-fiction ===
- "Twenty Will not Come Again," in Atlantic Monthly 245.5 (May 1980)
- "Sanctuary of the Storyteller: A New Orleans Couple Has Restored the House Where William Faulkner Became a Writer," in Southern Accents 15.3 (April, 1992)

== Awards ==
- Mademoiselle College Fiction Prize, 1949
- Best American Short Stories 1949 (honorable mention for "Rain Later")
- National Book Award for Fiction finalist, 1961
- John P. Marquand First Novel Award, 1961
- National Institute of Arts and Letters grant, 1962
- Guggenheim Fellowship, 1988

== Archives ==
Joan Williams's papers reside at the Albert and Shirley Small Special Collections Library at the University of Virginia.
