= Seymour Lawrence Books =

Seymour Lawrence Books was an imprint of Seymour Lawrence at:

- Delacorte Press (1965–1983)
- E. P. Dutton (1983–1988)
- Houghton Mifflin (1988–1994)
