= Gilchristosuchus =

Gilchristosuchus Temporal range: Late Cretaceous, 85–84 Ma

Scientific classification
- Domain: Eukaryota
- Kingdom: Animalia
- Phylum: Chordata
- Class: Reptilia
- Clade: Archosauria
- Clade: Pseudosuchia
- Clade: Crocodylomorpha
- Clade: Crocodyliformes
- Clade: Eusuchia
- Genus: †Gilchristosuchus; Wu and Brinkman, 1993

Type species
- †Gilchristosuchus palatinus Wu and Brinkman, 1993

Extinct genus of reptiles

Gilchristosuchus (meaning "Gilchrist [the owners of the ranch where the type specimen was found] crocodile") is an extinct genus of neosuchian crocodyliform. Its fossils have been found in the upper Milk River Formation of Alberta, Canada, in rocks of either latest Santonian or earliest Campanian age (Late Cretaceous). Gilchristosuchus was described in 1993 by Wu and Brinkman. The type species is G. palatinus, in reference to its distinctive palatine bones.

Gilchristosuchus is based on RTMP 91.101.1, a partial posterior skull and a neck vertebra. The skull would have been about 15 centimetres (5.9 in) long when complete. It represents the first articulated crocodylomorph specimen from the Milk River Formation. Isolated remains had been found earlier and assigned to Brachychampsa and Leidyosuchus; some of these fossils probably belong to Gichristosuchus. Although the specimen is not large, the ornamentation of the skull surfaces and bone fusion indicate it was an adult. Based on previous research, Wu and Brinkman suggested that their new genus was the most derived neosuchian that wasn't within Eusuchia, the group including all living crocodilians.
