= Sutherlin, Virginia =

Unincorporated community in Virginia, US

Coordinates: 36°37′29″N 79°11′49″W

Sutherlin is an unincorporated community in Halifax County, in the U.S. state of Virginia.

== Notable people ==
- Janis Martin, rockabilly musician
- Carrie Sutherlin, college president
