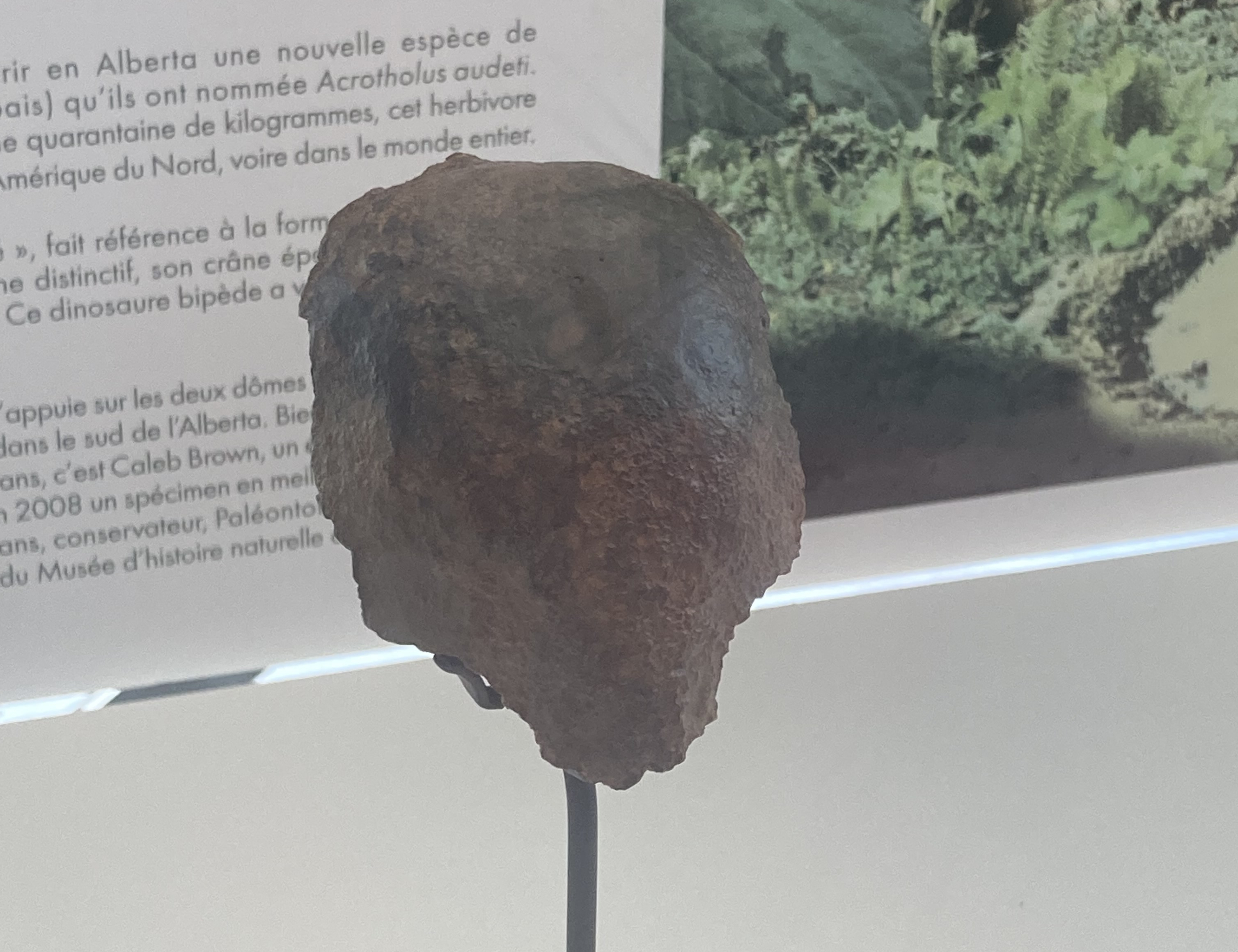
- Holotype dome on display at the Royal Ontario Museum

Scientific classification
- Kingdom: Animalia
- Phylum: Chordata
- Class: Reptilia
- Clade: Dinosauria
- Clade: †Ornithischia
- Clade: †Pachycephalosauria
- Family: †Pachycephalosauridae
- Subfamily: †Pachycephalosaurinae
- Genus: †Acrotholus; Evans et al., 2013

Type species
- †Acrotholus audeti Evans et al., 2013

= Acrotholus =

Acrotholus Temporal range: Late Cretaceous, 84–83.5 Ma

Extinct genus of dinosaurs

Acrotholus (Greek for "highest dome"- akros meaning highest and tholos meaning dome) is an extinct genus of pachycephalosaurian dinosaur that lived during the Santonian of the late Cretaceous, in the Milk River Formation of Canada. The type species, A. audeti, was named after Roy Audet allowing access to his ranch leading to the discovery of the species. The discovery of this specimen lead to several new revelations in the fossil records questioning the preservation of small-bodied organisms along with the evolution of early pachycephalosaurs. The iconic cranial dome found on Acrotholus makes it one of the earliest indisputable known members of the pachycephalosaur family. Like others of its clade, Acrotholus was a bipedal herbivore characterized by a dome-shaped head. The dome had often been associated with intra-species combat, although the exact methods of contact have been debated.

== History of discovery ==
The holotype was found in the Deadhorse Coulee Member of the Milk River Formation in Southern Alberta, Canada in 2008. This formation has been known to expose organisms from the Late Santonian. The fossil consists of a nearly complete frontoparietal dome along with the anterior half of the frontoparietal dome. Pachycephalosaurs in general are unique in dinosaur fossil records due to their relatively small size in relation to most dinosaurs in their time period, 40 kg or less. It has been suggested due to smaller bone being susceptible to destruction by carnivores and weathering, preservation bias exist for smaller species. Pachycephalosaurs are unique in this regard due to their recognizable head dome which is resistant towards pre-depositional destruction. Among known fossil specimens, approximately 66% are known from only cranial remains. Acrotholus' discovery further implicates the diversity of small bodied dinosaurs which may not have survived the fossil record, suggesting a much more complex ecology in the late Mesozoic era. A similar conclusion have been made with Asian species of pachycephalosaurs, with their ontogeny under debate due to their flat domed shapes.

== Description ==
=== Skull ===
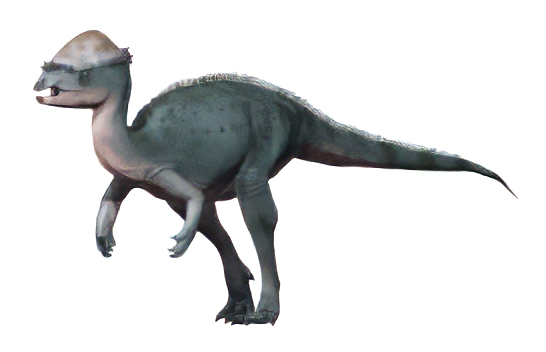
Restoration

Unlike most known pachycephalosaurs, A. audeti's dome on the skull is oval in shape having a maximum thickness of 55 millimetres (2.2 in) above the cerebral fossa. The lack of tesserae or tubercles indicate the specimen was past the juvenile stage of its development. Computed tomography (CT) scans reveal a low vascularity, high density, and fully fused internally fused frontal-frontal and frontoparietal sutures. Peripheral bones are high and well developed on the dome indicating the peripherals were incorporated within the dome. The incorporation of supraorbitals in the dome are similar if not greater than more derived pachycephalosaur. Compared to Stegoceras validum and later Campanian pachycephalosaurids, the dorsally convex frontonasal boss is short and not separated with grooves from the anterior supraorbital lobe. This region is approximately 50% of the thickness to the cerebral fossa (55 mm). Orbital fosse are only slightly concave and pierced by small foramina. Three depression can be seen on the ventral surface of the frontoparietal dome, the orbital cavity, endocranial fossa, and temporal fossa. Comparisons of the skull finds A. audeti to be distinctly different from other pachycephalosaurs in relation to dome. Most notably, the supraorbital region and incorporation of the supraorbital into the dome identify the specimen from other pachycephalosaurs. Very little soft tissue covering have been suggested over the dome due to the structural anatomy and hypothesized use.

== Phylogeny ==
A. audeti was recovered as the sister taxon to Prenocephale prenes. Acrotholus is the earliest known specimen of pachycephalosaur with derived traits from the fossil records, predating later known species of flat headed species in Asia. The discovery of this species further suggests pachycephalosaur head features were well established by the Santonian predating later species thought to have primitive traits such as Homalocephale and Stegoceras validum.

Below is a cladogram modified from Evans et al., 2013.

- Pachycephalosauria
  - Wannanosaurus yansiensis
  - Pachycephalosauridae
    - - Colepiocephale lambei
      - Hanssuesia sternbergi
      - Stegoceras novomexicanum
      - Stegoceras validum
    - - Goyocephale lattimorei
      - - Homalocephale calathocercos
        - - Tylocephale gilmorei
          - - Foraminacephale brevis
            - - Amtocephale gobiensis
              - - - Acrotholus audeti
                  - Prenocephale prenes
                - - - Alaskacephale gangloffi
                    - Pachycephalosaurus wyomingensis
                  - - Sphaerotholus buchholtzae
                    - Sphaerotholus goodwini

== Paleobiology ==
=== Growth ===
The relatively dome shape of the holotype indicates the specimen was an adult or nearing its completion of its adult transition. Consolidation between flat headed and domed pachycephalosaurs have been greatly debated. Fossils records from more numerous North American specimen suggest a flat domed juvenile stages. Juvenile Pachycephalosaurs wyomingensis have characteristics of nodes on the squamosal nearly identical to holotype fossils of Dracorex hogwartsia and Stygimoloch spinifer. A spike like node on the posteroventral region of the jugal match with that of D. hogwartsia. Such similarities with confirmed juvenile P. wyonmingensis and flat headed species from North America support their recognition as P. wyonmingensis and the ontogenic relationship in growth stages. Comparison of bone development in flat domed taxa from Asia have found patterns indicating active growth at the time of death. Closer analysis of related taxa, Stegoceras novomexicanium found holotype specimen to be juvenile in characteristics, with visible frontal-parietal sutures, small rounded tubercles on the dome, and vascularized internal skull bones. Another Asian taxa, Homalocephale calathocercos was also found exhibit juvenile characteristics in the fossil holotype though it has been proposed some species of pachycephalosaur exhibit pedomorphism.

=== Behavior ===
The most notable physiology of A. audeti is the fused frontal and parietal skull forming a thickened dome structure. The lack of living comparative morphology have led to various theories on the function of the structure. Two accepted hypotheses have been proposed to explain the appearance of the cranial dome. One of the hypotheses suggest the dome plays a visual role, either for sexual display or species recognition. However, such theories have been countered due to the relatively large energy investment required and the morphological changes that occur in the species life span. The more widely accepted and popular hypothesis explains the dome being used as a weapon. In modern species with analogous structures, such head ornaments have been used between intra-species combat. Analysis on dome of the more widely known specimen Pachycephalosaurus wyomingensis have some pathologies in the dome mirroring those of modern-day mammals exhibiting intra-species contact. In P. wyomingensis and other examined pachycephalosaur skulls, chronic osteomyelitis was observed, a pathology often associated with combat. Several skull specimens show various lesions with healing suggesting survival after contact. Flat headed individuals saw little cranial damage supporting their juvenile stage ontogeny. Comparison with extinct and extent species that were known to engage in infra-specific combat have found the formation of lesions to be consistent with their use. Morphological comparisons with modern ungulates practicing head butting have found similar dome shaped structures used in combat. The cancellous region found in head striking artiodactyls have been considered to be covering the domes of pachycephalosaurs to aid in protection against head impacts. In addition, tubular struts in the dome of the related taxa, Stegoceras, were comparable to pneumatized frontal sinuses found in some head-striking mammals. Modern archosaurs such as Ostriches and crocodiles exhibit similar ranges of pathologies due to intra-species combat.

== Paleoecology ==
Analysis of pachycephalosaurid skulls by Mallon and Evans, suggest many species frequently inhabited coastal areas contrary to their terrestrial lifestyle. In the same study, it was concluded that North American pachycephalosaurids lived in habitats near floodplains and coastal plains. Hindlimb proportions have been found to be similar to other modern animals such as moose and various wading birds that inhabit wetland areas. The Milk River Formation, where A. audeti is found, is home to many other extinct species in the late Cretaceous including other dinosaurs like Saurornitholestes and mammals like Alphadon.

== See also ==
- Timeline of pachycephalosaur research
