= Barnum Brown =

American paleontologist (1873–1963)

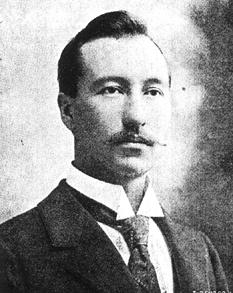
- Brown in 1897
- Born: February 12, 1873; Carbondale, Kansas, U.S.
- Died: February 5, 1963 (aged 89); New York City, New York, U.S.
- Education: University of Kansas
- Known for: Discovered first documented remains of Amphipithecus mogaungensis and Tyrannosaurus rex
- Spouse(s): Marion Raymond Brown; Lillian McLaughlin Brown
- Children: Frances R. Brown
- Scientific career
- Fields: Paleontology

Barnum Brown (February 12, 1873 – February 5, 1963), commonly referred to as Mr. Bones, was an American paleontologist. He discovered the first documented remains of Tyrannosaurus during a career that made him one of the most famous fossil hunters working from the late Victorian era into the early 20th century.

== Family and early life ==
Barnum Brown was born in Carbondale, Kansas on February 12, 1873 to William and Clara Silver Brown. Brown's parents moved to Kansas in 1859, traveling by covered wagon with their daughter, Melissa. Their second daughter, Alice Elizabeth, was born in 1860 in Osage County, Kansas, where the family would build a one-room cabin on top of a coal seam.

William made a living in Kansas first by raising corn, hogs, and cattle, but the political turmoil of Bleeding Kansas in the late 1850s and 1860s led to arson and theft of crops and livestock; he supported the family by digging and selling coal, as well as hauling supplies for the government with a freight line of ox-drawn wagons. In 1867, the Browns gave birth to their first son, Frank, who, in a few years, would be the one to suggest P.T. Barnum as a namesake for his little brother.

As a young boy, Brown helped with household chores around the farm and began his first fossil collection while following the stripping plow, which unearthed fossil corals and Native American arrowheads. Recognizing Brown's interest in science, his parents elected to send him to the only formal education available in Carbondale. He finished the highest level of schooling there in 1889, at the age of 16, and embarked on a four-month wagon journey to Montana with his father. Sources claim multiple purposes for the trip, including William's desire to give Brown traveling experience, evaluating possibilities for a new homestead, or to avoid a legal complaint of incest filed against William by Brown's oldest sister, Melissa. Upon returning from the trip in the fall, Brown began attending high school in Lawrence, then matriculated at the University of Kansas in 1893.

== University of Kansas ==
After graduating from high school, Brown attended the University of Kansas and took an early interest in archaeology and paleontology. As a freshman, he took a course with Samuel Wendell Williston, who then invited Brown, along with Ermine Cowles Case and Elmer S. Riggs, on a fossil collecting trip to Nebraska and South Dakota in the summer of 1894. Williston would become Brown's advisor and primary professor at KU, and invited him on another summer expedition to Wyoming in 1895.

== American Museum of Natural History career ==
While working in South Dakota with Williston in 1894, Brown met a crew from the American Museum of Natural History (AMNH), led by paleontologist Jacob Wortman. In 1896, Wortman needed a replacement for an assistant, and Williston suggested Brown; he left his classes at the University of Kansas before the semester ended to accompany Wortman on an expedition to the Morrison Formation in Wyoming. Brown impressed Wortman and the head curator of the AMNH's Vertebrate Paleontology Department, Henry Fairfield Osborn, with the discovery of a nearly complete Coryphodon skeleton near the Greybull River. In early 1897, Osborn offered Brown a job as an assistant curator at the AMNH as well as a scholarship for graduate work at Columbia University.

Sponsored by the AMNH, Brown traversed the country bargaining and trading for fossils. His field was not limited to dinosaurs. He was known to collect or obtain anything of possible scientific value. Often, he simply sent money to have fossils shipped to the AMNH, and any new specimen of interest often resulted in a flurry of letters between the discoverer and Brown. With respect to nomenclature, Brown often named fossils after people or events that were relevant to his life at the time of discovery.

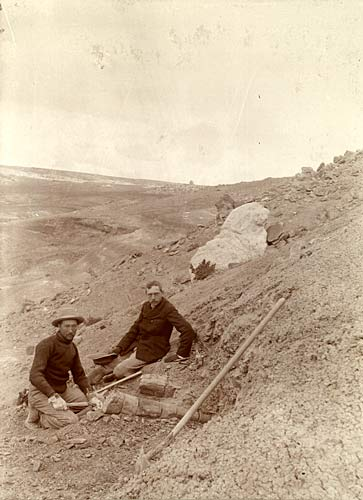
Brown (left) with Henry Fairfield Osborn and the leg bone of Diplodocus specimen AMNH 223

Brown worked a handful of years in Como Bluff, Wyoming for AMNH in the late 1890s, discovering a prominent Diplodocus specimen and introducing new jacketing and collecting procedures. He also led an expedition to the Hell Creek Formation of southeastern Montana, where, in 1902, he discovered and excavated the first documented remains of Tyrannosaurus rex. In 1910, Brown was promoted to Associate Curator in the Vertebrate Paleontology Department at the AMNH.

The Hell Creek digs produced extravagant quantities of fossils, enough to fill up whole train cars. As was common practice then, Brown's crews used controlled blasts of dynamite to remove the tons of rock covering their fossil discoveries. Everything was moved with horse-drawn wagons and pure manpower. Seldom were any site data recorded.

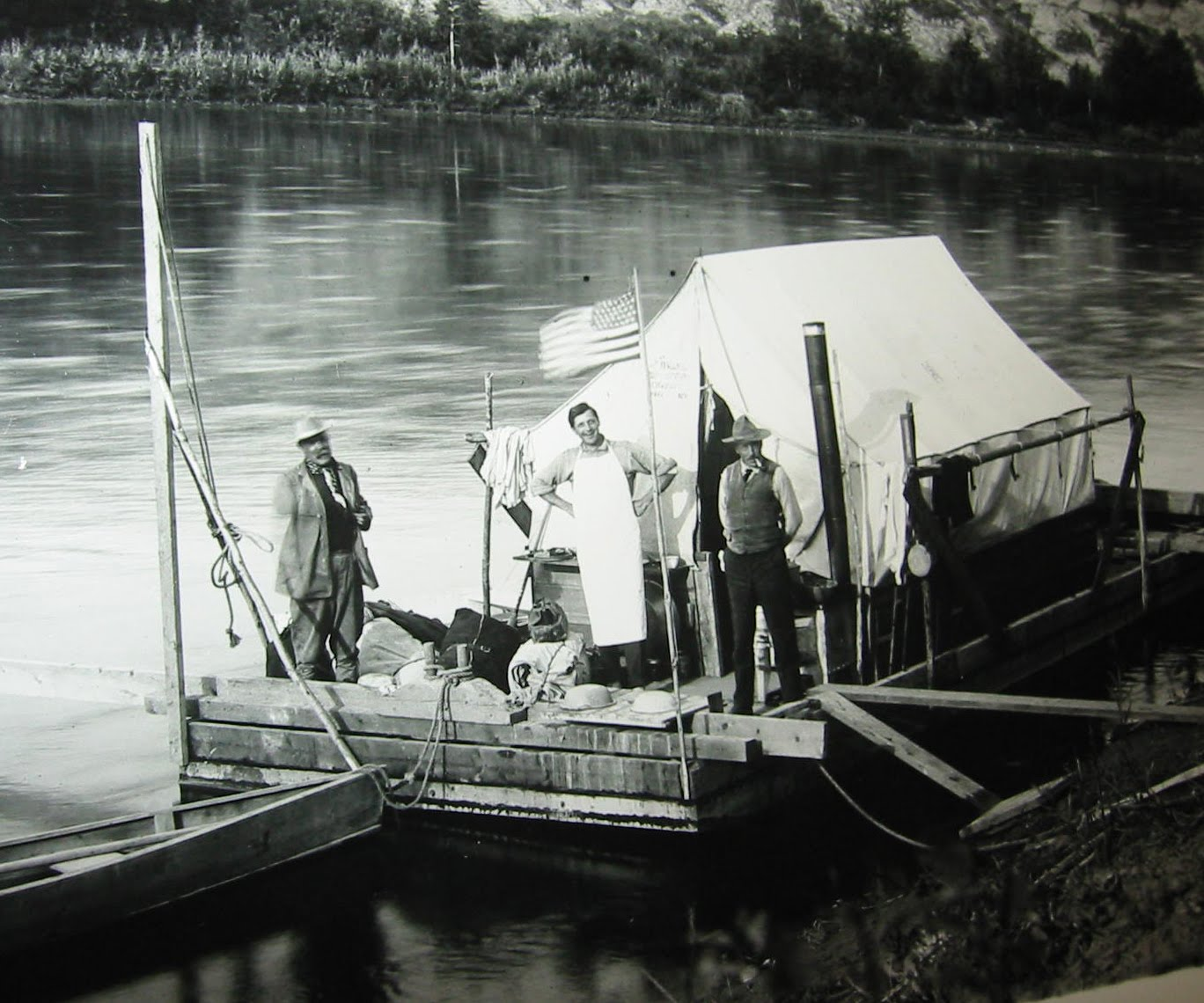
The AMNH scow Mary Jane in 1911. Left to right: Henry Osborn; Fred Saunders (cook from Stettler, Alberta) and Brown

After nearly a decade in Montana, Brown headed to Alberta, Canada, and the Red Deer River near Drumheller. There, Brown and his crew spent the middle 1910s floating down the river on a flatboat, stopping along the way to prospect for fossils at promising-looking sites. Trying to outdo them along the same stretch of river was the famous Sternberg family of fossil hunters. A playful, friendly rivalry arose between the Browns and the Sternbergs, and their competing discoveries went down in the annals of paleontology.

In 1910, in one of their most significant finds, Brown's team uncovered several hind feet from a group of Albertosaurus in Dry Island Buffalo Jump Provincial Park. For years, the fossils were largely forgotten in the recesses of the American Museum of Natural History in New York City. In the 1990s, Dr. Phil Currie, then head of dinosaur research at the Royal Tyrrell Museum of Palaeontology in Canada, relocated the site of the bones using only an old photograph as a guide. He recommenced excavations there in the summer of 1998, and examination of the site under the Tyrrell Museum's auspices lasted until August, 2005. However, after Currie took a new job at the University of Alberta, a new crew began working at the site in 2006, intending to continue for several years.

Brown conducted his last formal field work season at the age of 83, when he returned to the Claggett Shale in Montana in 1955, where he collected a plesiosaur skeleton. He was a member of Sigma Xi and the Society of Vertebrate Paleontology, as well as a fellow of the Geological Society of America, the Royal Geographical Society, the American Association of Petroleum Geologists, the New York Academy of Sciences, and the Paleontological Society.

== Earliest anthropoid discovery ==
In early 1923, Brown travelled with his wife Lilian to Yangon, the capital of what was then Burma. Brown focused his fossil prospection along areas of Pondaung Sandstone. A mandible with three teeth was recorded and catalogued at an exposure of sandstone outside of the town of Mogaung. He did not recognize the significance of his find until 14 years later, when vertebrate paleontologist Edwin H. Colbert, of the AMNH, identified the fossil as a new species of primate and the earliest known anthropoid in the world. He named the holotype Amphipithecus mogaungensis, or the "ape-like creature of Mogaung", but considerable debate remains regarding its status as a primate and the lack of fossils compounds this issue.

== Public persona ==
Brown lived at the tail end of an unprecedented age of scientific discovery, and was one of its more colorful practitioners. At dig sites in Canada, Brown was frequently photographed wearing a large fur coat.

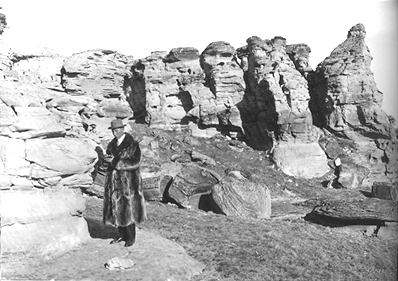
Barnum Brown conducting field work in a fur coat in Montana, 1914.

During World War I and World War II, he worked as an "intelligence asset" for the Office of Strategic Services and the Bureau of Economic Warfare. During his many trips abroad, he was not above picking up spare cash acting as a corporate spy for oil companies. Sinclair Oil funded many of Brown's expeditions and research, particularly during the Great Depression, and the company continues to use Diplodocus, discovered by Brown, as its logo.

== Personal life and death ==
On February 13, 1904, Brown married school teacher Marion Raymond in Oxford, New York. She accompanied him on several expeditions, including the 1905 trip to the Hell Creek Formation during which Brown discovered two additional Tyrannosaurus rex specimens. The couple had a daughter, Frances R. Brown, in 1908. After Marion died of scarlet fever in 1910, Frances was raised primarily by her maternal grandparents. She would go on to become a dean at Radcliffe College and Longwood College, as well as the president of Chevy Chase Junior College. She also wrote a memoir about her father, Let's Call Him Barnum, in 1987.

In 1920, Brown met socialite Lillian MacLaughlin Brown while traveling in Egypt, and the couple were married in Calcutta, India in 1922. She wrote three memoirs about her expeditions with her husband, I Married a Dinosaur (1950), Bring 'em Back Petrified (1950), and Cleopatra Slept Here (1951)

In early February of 1963, Brown slipped into a sudden coma and died on February 5. Brown was buried in River View Cemetery in Oxford, New York, the hometown of his first wife, Marion Raymond.

An homage to Brown was in the 1998 IMAX film T-Rex: Back to the Cretaceous, in which he was played by actor Laurie Murdoch.

== Sources ==
- Barnum Brown: Dinosaur Hunter, Walker Books for Young Readers (2006) ISBN 0-8027-9602-8
- Archival Field Notebooks of Paleontological Expeditions – American Museum of Natural History
- Fossil Ancestors of Burma (1985)
- Bones for Barnum Brown: Adventures of a Dinosaur Hunter (1985) ISBN 0-87565-011-2
- Tyrannosaurus Rex & Barnum Brown (Dinosaurs & Their Discoverers Series) by Brooke Hartzog (1999) ISBN 0-8239-5328-9
- A Triceratops Hunt In Pioneer Wyoming: The Journals of Barnum Brown & J.P. Sams: The University of Kansas Expedition of 1895 (2004) ISBN 0-931271-77-0
- Barnum Brown: The Man Who Discovered Tyrannosaurus Rex by Lowell Dingus and Mark A. Norell (2010) ISBN 0-520-25264-0
