= Carrie Sutherlin =

American educator and college president

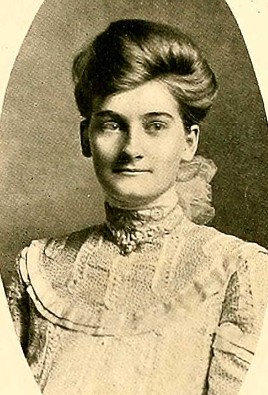
- Born: April 4, 1884; Sutherlin, Virginia, U.S.
- Died: July 17, 1971 (aged 87); London, Ohio, U.S.
- Burial place: Prospect Hill Cemetery, Front Royal, Virginia
- Education: State Teachers College of Virginia; Peabody College for Teachers (B.S. 1919); Columbia University (M.A. 1926)
- Occupations: College president and educator
- Employer(s): Arlington Hall Junior College; Chevy Chase Junior College
- Spouse: John McGill Montz (1964-1971)

Carrie Sutherlin (born April 4, 1884 – July 17, 1971) was an American educator and college president. She was president of Arlington Hall Junior College and Chevy Chase Junior College.

== Early life and education ==
Carrie Sutherlin was born on April 4, 1884, in Sutherlin, Halifax County, Virginia. She was the daughter of Elizabeth "Betty" (née Peagler) and Christopher Thomas Sutherlin, a farmer. She had two brothers and four sisters. The family lived at their home, Willow Bond, in Sutherlin.

She graduated from the State Teachers College of Virginia, now Longwood University. While there, she was the secretary of The Cunningham Literary Society. In June 1919, she graduated with a Bachelor of Science from Peabody College for Teachers, now Vanderbilt University. She also took courses at the University of Chicago, Cornell University, and Vanderbilt University.

She took a leave of absence from teaching in 1926 to attend Columbia University, receiving a Master of Arts degree in 1926.

== Career ==
Sutherlin began her career in education at the Miller Manual School in Crozet, Virginia. In June 1905, she became a teaching assistant in the English Department of the State Teacher's College in Farmville, Virginia. In the summers of 1910, she taught English and literature at the State Teacher's College She also was a faculty member of the Covington State Summer School for Teachers in the summer of 1915. She taught summer school at the Peabody College for Teachers in Nashville, Tennessee, in 1916. She also taught at the State Teacher's College summer school in 1917, 1919, and 1920. She also taught at Sullins College in Bristol, Virginia.

In 1920, she left the State Teacher's College to teach in Dallas, Texas. The next year, she was the head of the English department of Chatham Episcopal Institute (now Chatham Hall) in Chatham, Virginia. In June 1922, she was appointed head of the English department of the Alabama Girls’ Technical Institute and College for Women, starting with the 1922–23 academic year. In the fall of 1924, she was again a faculty member with the State Teacher's College in Farmville. She took a leave of absence in 1926 to attend graduate school. She returned to the college in the fall of 1926.

In 1927, she became the academic dean of Arlington Hall Junior College. In September 1933, she became the college's principal and was later its president. She steered the college through the Great Depression, overseeing increases in student enrollment and the construction of new facilities. In the fall of 1926, the college had the largest enrollment of students in its history. Arlington Hall Junior College closed in 1942 when the Signal Intelligence Service took over its campus for the war effort.

In July 1942, Sutherlin was appointed president of Chevy Chase Junior College. By 1946, the junior college had achieved the highest enrollment in its history. However, Sutherlin resigned from her position in 1947 and retired from academic administration. She returned to the State Teacher's College as an assistant professor of English, teaching there until 1952.

== Professional affiliations ==
Sutherlin was a member of the National Association of Junior Colleges. In May 1936, she was a delegate for the American Council of Education and attended a reception at the White House that was given by Eleanor Roosevelt.

== Personal life ==
In the summer of 1939, Sutherlin took a two-month cruise to South America, stopping in Argentina, the Bahamas, Brazil, Cuba, Puerto Rico, Trinidad, Uruguay, and Venezuela. She was also active with the YWCA. She was the local treasurer of the Women's Missionary Society of the 11th Methodist Church of Gadsden, Alabama in 1925. She was a member of the Prince Edward County Branch of the Association for the Preservation of Virginia Antiquities, serving as its first vice director in 1959.

After her retirement, Sutherlin continued to live in Farmville. She was active in the Longwood College Alumnae Association, serving as chair of its Morrison Memorial Library committee. On August 31, 1964, she married John McGill Montz in Lexington, Virginia. They moved to Atlanta, Georgia and, later, to London, Ohio where he was a professor of civil engineering at Ohio State University.

She died on July 17, 1971, at the Madison Elms Nursing Home in London, Ohio. She was buried at Prospect Hill Cemetery in Front Royal, Virginia.
