= Merloyd Lawrence Books =

Merloyd Lawrence Books was an imprint of Merloyd Ludington Lawrence at:

- Seymour Lawrence/Delacorte Press (1965–1982)
- Addison-Wesley (1982–1997)
- Perseus Books Group (1997-2022)
