= Chevy Chase Junior College =

School in Chevy Chase, Maryland (1903–1950)

- Former names: Chevy Chase College (1903–1909); Chevy Chase College and Seminary (1909–1917); Chevy Chase School (1917–1938); Chevy Chase: A Junior College and Senior High (1938–1941)
- Type: Private, women
- Active: 1903–1950
- Location: 7100 Connecticut Avenue, Chevy Chase, Maryland, United States
- Campus: 11 acres (4.5 ha); Suburban
- Language: English
- Colors: Black and gold
- Nickname: Chevy Amazons

Chevy Chase Junior College, also known as Chevy Chase College and Seminary, operated from 1903 to 1950 in Chevy Chase, Maryland.

A residential and day school for girls and young ladies, it provided classes for the last three years of high school and a two-year college. The high school was discontinued in 1947, and the college closed in 1950.

== History ==
In 1903, Dr./Rev. Samuel Nelson Barker and his wife, Mary N. Barker, leased the former Chevy Chase Spring Hotel (aka the Chevy Chase Inn) to establish a college and finishing school. Rev. Barker had served as the president of Sullins College. The couple were the new college's principals.

They opened Chevy Chase College on October 1, 1903. It offered preparatory and college classes, modern languages, music, field hockey, and preparation for foreign travel. Six students graduated in 1906; 23 in 1908. In April 1907, the Barkers purchased the property for $60,000 ($2,073,214 in today's money). After 1909, the school was called Chevy Chase College and Seminary. The Barkers retired in May 1917 after three decades working in education. At the time, the school had 70 students.

Dr. Frederic Ernest Farrington and his wife, Isabelle Scudder Farrington, purchased the college on February 7, 1917; in May 1917, they took charge and renamed it the Chevy Chase School. Farrington had earned an M.A. and Ph.D. from Columbia University and had worked in Columbia, The Speyer School, University of Texas, and Yale University. Most recently, he had worked for the U.S. Bureau of Education. He served as the school's headmaster from May 1917, and later served as president until he died in 1930. Because Farrington believed his students would become housewives, he shifted the curriculum to what he considered to be of practical use.

After Farrington died, the school was operated by his widow as its regent from 1931 to 1941. She had attended Mount Holyoke College, Sorbonne University, and the University of California. During her tenure, she appointed six presidents. Theodore Halbert Wilson, a former principal of St. Johnsbury Academy, was president from 1930 to 1932 and also taught philosophy classes. In 1933, the college announced a collaborative program with George Washington University that allowed some of its students to take classes at the university. At the time, Henry Gratten Doyle was the dean of junior college at George Washington and the provost of Chevy Chase.

After Wilson, Flaud Conaroe Wooton served as president for the 1934–35 academic year. Philip Milo Bail was the college's president from 1935 to 1940. He limited enrollment to 100 students and began awarding Associate of Arts degrees. From 1938 to 1941, the college was marketed as Chevy Chase: A Junior College and Senior High.

In 1940, Isabelle Farrington died and bequeathed a 13/15 share of the college to the Scudder Association Foundation, a charitable organization previously established by her family. In 1940, the college was incorporated in the State of Maryland as a non-profit institution and changed its name to Chevy Chase Junior College. It was operated by members of the Scudder family.

Kendric Nichols Marshall, a former instructor at Harvard University, was the college's acting president during the 1940 to 1941 academic year and its president from 1941 to 1942. Carrie Sutherlin was its president from 1942 to 1947. She received her M.A. from Columbia University and was previously the dean and president of Arlington Hall Junior College. Because Arlington Hall was taken over by the U.S. Army Signal Intelligence Service in 1942 for the war effort, Sutherlin was able to bring many of its faculty and administrative staff to Chevy Chase Junior College. In 1946, the college's enrollment was at an all-time high of 119. Its high school was discontinued in 1947.

After Sutherlin, Frances R. Brown, the college's dean from 1944 to 1947, became president in 1947. She had received an M.A. from the University of Chicago and had led the English department at Arlington Hall Junior College under Sutherlin. As president of Chevy Chase Junior College, she oversaw the addition of a science and technology building and other expansions to accommodate the growing number of students. Student enrollment continued to grow, reaching the highest numbers in the college's history. However, her construction plans may have been too ambitious, and the college faced insurmountable financial difficulties. Brown announced that the college would not reopen in August 1950, right before the start of the new school year. Surprisingly, its alumnae and students, the college closed for good at the end of the academic year in June 1950.

Brown said the college was closing due to "low enrollment, rising costs, and the uncertainty of the international situation". The latter being the Korean War. However, Brown did not give up on the college and appealed to its alumnae for financial support. She also asked alumnae to help increase the potential for more students by finding additional boarding facilities. Her efforts were unsuccessful, and the college did not reopen.

In January 1951, the Farrington family sold the former college campus to the National 4-H Foundation to serve as the National 4-H Center. However, the U.S. Defense Department used the campus for an Operations Research Office during the Korean War, and the 4-H did not occupy the campus until 1959.

== Campus ==
The campus was located at 7100 Connecticut Avenue in Chevy Chase, Maryland. It consisted of 11 acres (4.5 ha) that were "a sanctuary from the negative elements of urban life" in nearby Washington, D.C. The campus was 35 minutes from the city via an electric trolley line.

Its main building was originally constructed by The Chevy Chase Land Company as the Chevy Chase Spring Hotel or Chevy Chase Inn. The inn was a suburban resort hotel that opened in 1894 but failed to attract enough business. The building was in a colonial architecture style with a large front porch and classical columns. The brick building housed classrooms, administrative offices, bedrooms for residential students and teachers, a kitchen, a dining room, living rooms, and a reception area. The bedrooms housed two students; a few had private bathrooms, but most boarding students used the communal bathing rooms. Its basement included a recreational space called the Cave that included a billiard table, card tables, and a ping pong table. There was also a gymnasium.

Later, the campus included a house for the president, called Scudder House. In 1939, the campus expanded to include a "practice home" on nearby 3 Thornapple Street that was used as part of the school's Home Economics Department. As its enrollment increased in the 1940s, the main building was expanded with the addition of more classrooms and dormitories. In the late 1940s, a new science and technology building was constructed, and the art studio and secretarial science department were remodeled to accommodate more students.

== Academics ==
Initially, the college was a residential and day school for girls and young ladies, and was considered a finishing school However, it offered diplomas in art, music, and oratory, as well as Bachelor of Arts, Bachelor of Literature, and Bachelor of Science degrees.

In 1911, the high school curriculum included algebra, American history, botany, English, French, German, and zoology. Its college students studied art history, astronomy, French, geology, German, Latin, literature, mythology, sociology, and trigonometry. The seminary also provided instruction in art, dancing, domestic arts, music, physical education, and speech.

With the change of ownership in 1917, the curriculum also changed. Farrington shifted the curriculum to practical courses for future housewives and homemakers. He believed "Chevy girls should be able to read, write, and speak the English language. They should know mathematics, all the better to handle household accounts. Their "social studies" should focus on social progress; their science courses should prepare them to understand the importance of scientific processes. Instead of Latin and Greek, they should learn the modern languages, and develop a linguistic pluralism."

Under Farrington's guidance, home economics became important to the students' education. They learned cooking, hostessing, house management, sewing, and textiles. In 1939, a "practice home" was purchased for the Home Economics Department for practical training. Small groups of students lived in the house for six weeks, taking turns serving as house managers, purchasing groceries, budgeting, and preparing for and hosting events in the practice house.

In the late 1930s, the college began awarding Associate of Arts degrees. A business program was added in the 1933–1934 academic year that included accounts, business law, economics, history, psychology, and sociology. In 1940, the academic curriculum still prepared homemakers but also focused on readying students for continuing education at a four-year college and preparing the students for a job in journalism, clothing design, interior decorating, or secretarial science. President Marshall developed a new program of study in political problems where students observed government in action and supplemented their lectures and seminars by conducting primary source research. In The Washington Post, Marshall said, "The plan will not be confined to the social studies field. It will also permeate the fields of science and mathematics, languages, literature, and fine arts. In each of them, the college will draw on Washington’s resources in leaders and institutions – for seminars, round-table discussions, and for observations by students."

== Student life ==
The school had a variety of clubs and sports. It had an Athletic Council, French Club, Dramatic Club, Social Activities Committee, and Social Service Club. A group known as the Francis staged musicals, dramas, and comedies. Students produced its newspaper, The Barker, and The Chaser yearbook. There was a chapter of Phi Mu sorority on campus from 1907 to 1910.

The students held holiday parties, dances, and proms on campus and in Washington, D.C. hotels with male guests from nearby schools. Students also attended dances at the U.S. Naval Academy at Annapolis. Students also took field trips to Mount Vernon and to Washington, D.C. where they visited the United States Capitol, the Library of Congress, and the national museums. In the 1920s and 1930s, lecture series brought artists, politicians, and writers, to the campus, including Amelia Earhart, Hamlin Garland, and Thornton Wilder.

== Athletics ==
From its beginnings, students participated in physical activities such as basketball, billiards, croquet, golf, and tennis. In the 1920s and 1930s, the students participated in intramural sports and were divided into one of two teams—the Blacks and the Golds. The school's colors were black and gold. Intramural sports included archery, baseball, basketball, field hockey, horseback riding, soccer, swimming, and tennis. By the 1940s, the college had archery, badminton, and tennis teams known as the Chevy Amazons. However, the team never competed against another school.

== Notable people ==
=== Alumae ===
- Julia Compton Moore, military advocate
- Frances Todman, philanthropist
- Joan Williams, author and associate of William Faulkner
- Peggy Hopkins Joyce, actress, model, and socialite

=== Faculty ===
- Philip Milo Bail, a president who was later dean of the Butler College of Education at Butler University and president of Omaha University
- Frances R. Brown, dean and president
- Sheffield Kagy, head of the art department from 1940 to 1943, noted printmaker and muralist
- Effa Funk Muhse, biologist and biology instructor
- Carrie Sutherlin, president; former dean and president of Arlington Hall Junior College

== See also ==
- List of colleges and universities in Maryland
- List of current and historical women's universities and colleges in the United States
