= Rock Creek Forest =

Neighborhood in Chevy Chase and Silver Spring, Maryland, US

Coordinates: 38°59′28″N 77°03′15″W

Rock Creek Forest is a mostly residential neighborhood in Silver Spring / Chevy Chase, Maryland. It is bordered by Chevy Chase to the west, Silver Spring to the east, the border with Washington, D.C., to the south. Maryland Route 410 (East West Highway) runs through the neighborhood. The historically African-American neighborhood of Lyttonsville is to the north, while Rock Creek Park and the neighborhoods of North Portal Estates / Colonial Village / Shepherd Park are to the south.

== History ==
First developed in the 1940s by Sam Eig, a Jewish real estate developer, the neighborhood attracted Jews from Washington, D.C., because Eig did not use the antisemitic covenants that were common in many Washington, D.C., neighborhoods. Because of antisemitism in Washington, D.C., Eig was barred from developing homes in some of DC's most desirable neighborhoods.

But Eig did use anti-Black racial covenants until the passage of the 1968 Fair Housing Act, advertising his whites-only Rock Creek Forest development as "ideally located and sensibly restricted." A typical racially restrictive deed in Rock Creek Forest from 1941 says, "No person of any race other than the Caucasian race shall use or occupy any building or any lot, except that this covenant shall not prevent occupancy by domestic servants of a different race domiciled with an owner or tenant."

== Attractions ==
The Rock Creek Shopping Center on Grubb Road is the shopping center for the community. As of 2022, the shopping center includes the Parkway Deli (a Jewish-American delicatessen), the Daily Dish cafe, a Chinese restaurant, a nail salon, a veterinarian, a paint store, and the Corner Market. Rock Creek Forest is home to the Temple Shalom Reform Jewish synagogue, Ohr Kodesh Congregation, St. Paul United Methodist Church, and Christ the King Catholic Church.

== Transportation ==
Rock Creek Forest is served by Metrobus route M70 and Ride On routes 1 and 11. Washington Metro service is available on the Red Line in nearby Silver Spring, Forest Glen, and Wheaton. By 2027 or earlier, Purple Line service will be available at the nearby Lyttonsville and 16th Street–Woodside stations.
