= Lyttonsville =

- Neighborhood
- Location in Maryland
- Coordinates: 39°00′05″N 77°03′45″W
- Country: United States
- State: Maryland
- County: Montgomery
- Unincorporated community: Silver Spring
- ZIP Code: 20910
- Area codes: 301, 240

Lyttonsville is a mostly residential neighborhood of Silver Spring, Maryland. Established in the 1850s, it is among the oldest neighborhoods in Montgomery County and is a notable example of a community created by free African Americans before the Civil War. Today, Lyttonsville is a 68-acre, predominantly residential neighborhood mostly composed of small single-family homes.

== Location ==
Located in the Silver Spring CDP, Lyttonsville is bordered by East-West Highway (Maryland Route 410) to the south, beyond which is the neighborhood of Rock Creek Forest and, further south, Washington, D.C. Rock Creek Park and Chevy Chase are located to the west, Forest Glen Park to the north, and Woodside and Downtown Silver Spring to the east.

== History ==
Before the establishment of Lyttonsville, the area was home to large tobacco plantations, including Edgewood and the Highlands. The landowners included the prominent Carroll and Brent families, who introduced a large slave population to the area.

In 1853, Samuel Lytton, a free African-American man who worked in the nearby house of newspaper editor Francis Preston Blair, purchased more than four acres of land from a white farmer, Leonard Johnson, on the east side of Brookville Road near today's Garfield Avenue. This tract became the center of Lyttonsville, one of the first Black communities in Montgomery County. Lytton is often erroneously referred to as a freed slave, but there is no historical evidence that he was ever enslaved. Two churches and a two-room schoolhouse were long the heart of the tight-knit community. In the 1870s, the Baltimore & Ohio Railroad built the Metropolitan Branch line past, or perhaps through, the neighborhood. A bridge over the tracks at Talbot Avenue eventually connect the area to Silver Spring. In 1918, the bridge over the railroad was replaced with the one-lane metal Talbot Street bridge.

Lyttonsville had about 60 Black households and 300 residents by 1930. Shops and houses sat along Brookville Road and Garfield Avenue, whose intersection hosted the Pilgrim Baptist Church and its cemetery. In 1917, the two-room Linden School for grades 1-7 was built on the north side of Garfield. "The school, which had no running water or plumbing, served the African American community until Montgomery County’s schools were integrated in 1955," the 2017 sector plan said. Brookville Road also hosted a beer hall named Ike’s Blue Moon.

The neighborhood lacked running water and paved streets until the late 1960s and early 1970s, when the Montgomery County government acted after years of lobbying by residents. Racist county policies had "enabled poverty to set in and enabled environmental racism to run rampant through the community", according to the chair of the Montgomery County Historic Preservation Commission. Lyttonsville was "already suffering from substantial disinvestment, environmental pollution issues, and was desperately in need of assistance"—indeed, county planning documents consistently identified Lyttonsville as the area most in need of assistance. The county decided to seize much of Lyttonsville, including 60% of the residential area and one church, using eminent domain. The land was sold to developers, who built apartment complexes, an industrial park, a Washington Suburban Sanitary Commission service center, and a Ride On bus depot.

By 2012, the community had become ethnically and racially diversified. Although descendants of some of the original residents still live in the neighborhood, Lyttonsville is now home to residents from around the world, including Africa, Southeast Asia, and elsewhere. The arrival of the Purple Line's Lyttonsville station by 2027 is expected to transform the neighborhood.

== Transportation ==
Lyttonsville is served by Metrobus numbers J1 and J2, as well as by Ride On numbers 1, 2, 5, and 11. Washington Metro service is available on the Red Line in nearby Downtown Silver Spring, Forest Glen, and Wheaton. By 2027, Purple Line service will be available at the nearby Lyttonsville, 16th Street–Woodside station, and Silver Spring stations.

== See also ==
- Forest Glen Park, Maryland
- Rock Creek Forest
- Talbot Avenue bridge
