= Gandhi Brigade =

The Gandhi Brigade is a youth voice project that was started in Silver Spring, Maryland.

The organization was founded in 2005 by Richard Jaeggi. Founding members are Juanita Bailey, Joan Christopher, Nicci Jones, Hawa Toure, Mike Morris, Jess Samuda, Kevin Crockett and Dan Samels.

== Video Documentaries ==
From Out of the Blue (2005) is a retrospect of people's memories of September 11, 2001. Ordinary people were interviewed at various locations on the fourth anniversary of that event.

Fresh View (2006) is a collection of five short personal videos that express the concerns of their teen producer. Topics include accessible transportation, harassment of women, and the environment.

Finding Our Turf (2006) documents the phenomenon of "The Turf,"an area of artificial turf in downtown Silver Spring that was intended as an interim solution to a delayed construction project but grew to be an enormously popular informal gathering spot that was especially attractive to teens. Finding Our Turf won recognition at the Takoma Park Film Festival.

What's Your Story? (2007)is a collection of three short videos that grew out of a participatory video experiment that connected adults and youth through taped dialogues. The subjects of the videos are teen-adult communication, teen jobs, and the need for a teen run skateboard park in Silver Spring, Maryland.

"PROPAGANDA!" (2007) was a mixed media campaign in which teens, focusing on the issue of immigration, created a poster promoting the natural rights of all people and created a video about their experience of using the poster to change perceptions in their home town.

Second Chances (2009) was a video that documented the stories of three teens with arrest records and the challenges the face overcoming their past. The video was screened in the youth media track of Silverdocs media education conference.

Crossing Borders (2009) was the Gandhi Brigade's first international effort. Eight teens from Silver Spring, Maryland traveled to Suchitoto, El Salvador where the met up with two local youth groups for a youth media exchange.
