= Talbot Avenue bridge =

Bridge in Silver Spring, Maryland, US

Talbot Avenue Bridge
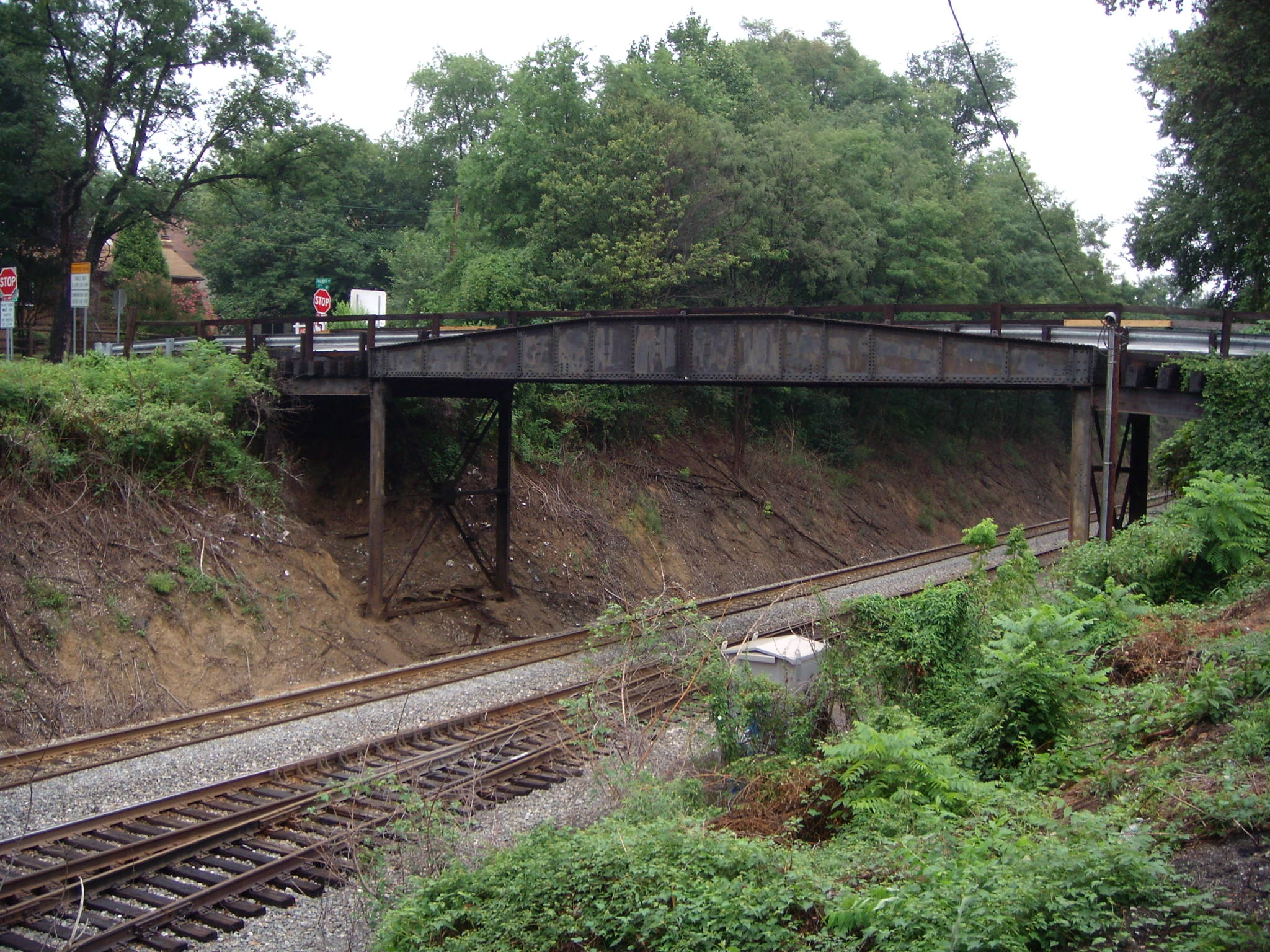
- The second Talbot Avenue Bridge, 2007
- Coordinates: 39.00195°N 77.04482°W
- Carries: Talbot Avenue, Georgetown Branch Trail
- Crosses: Metropolitan Subdivision
- Locale: Silver Spring, Maryland
- Begins: Lyttonsville
- Ends: North Woodside
- Owner: Montgomery County, Maryland

Characteristics
- Width: 45 – 55 feet
- No. of lanes: 2

History
- Opened: May 24, 2024

Location
- Interactive map of Talbot Avenue Bridge

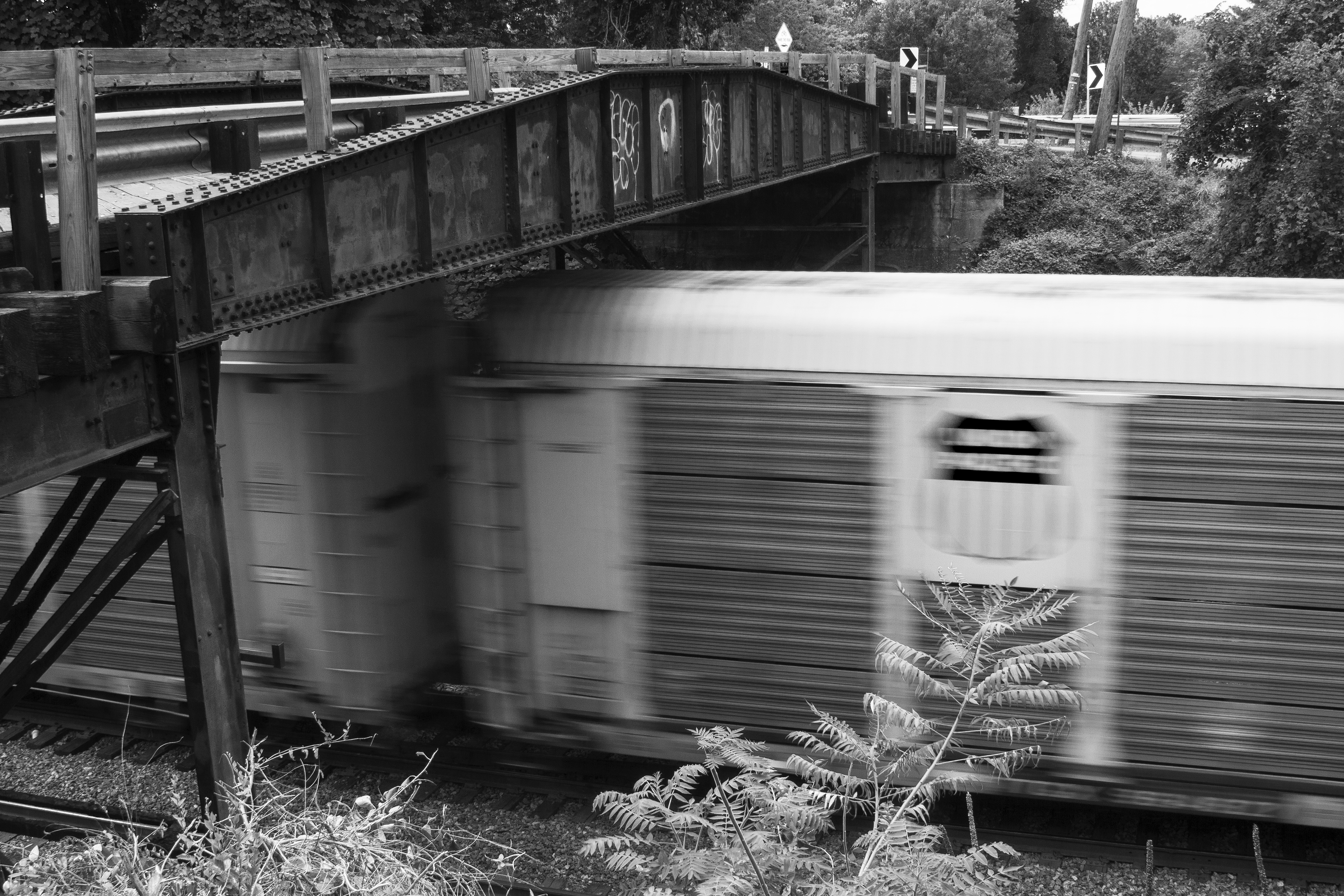
A CSX freight train passes under Talbot Avenue Bridge, 2015

The Talbot Avenue bridge is a two-lane pedestrian and vehicle bridge in Silver Spring, Maryland, that connects the neighborhoods of Lyttonsville and Woodside. It carries the Georgetown Branch Trail extension of the Capital Crescent Trail over the Metropolitan Subdivision of the CSX railroad.

Built in 2024, it is the third bridge across railroad tracks in this location. Earlier bridges connected an antebellum community founded by a free Black laborer to neighborhoods where for decades Black people were allowed to work, but not live.

== History ==
The first bridge at this location was built to cross the Baltimore and Ohio Railroad's double-track Metropolitan Branch line, which opened in 1873.

The second bridge, a one-lane metal girder structure, was installed in 1918. Its primary span used components of a dismantled railroad turntable. The structure was 106 feet long and 14.5 feet wide, from timber curb to curb and an out-to-out width of 18 feet. The greater structure consisted of a through-plate girder in the center span, rolled girders in the end spans, timber floor beams, a wood plank deck and a timber railing.

A new deck was added in 1986. The bridge connected Hanover Street and Lanier Drive.

A 1993 inspection report indicated the structure was in fair to poor condition with cracking, corrosion and section loss. The wood and steel on the bridge had been in disrepair, making it hard to keep intact.

In 2016, preservationists protested plans to demolish the structure to make way for the planned light rail Purple Line.

In May 2017, the bridge was closed to vehicles after a safety inspection determined it to be unsafe.

In February 2019, the bridge was recorded as part of the Historic American Engineering Record. The project historian wrote, "The bridge also is significant for its social history and as a cultural landscape element. The tracks beneath the bridge formed a dividing line separating segregated suburban communities. African Americans living west of the bridge in Lyttonsville relied on the structure as a vital link to jobs, shopping, and recreational opportunities unavailable in their community. People east of the bridge lived in what was historically a sundown suburb: a place where African Americans could not buy or rent homes and where Jim Crow segregation was rigidly enforced."

The bridge closed in June 2019, and was dismantled later that year. Its main span was preserved and stored, with plans to place it on public display along the Georgetown Branch Trail.

The third bridge opened on May 24, 2024. The new bridge carries the Georgetown Branch Trail extension of the Capital Crescent Trail to Silver Spring.
