= Connecticut Avenue station =

Future light rail station in Maryland

1. redirect Template:Br separated entries; From an alternative hyphenation: This is a redirect from a title with an alternative hyphenation of the target name. Pages that link to this redirect may be updated to link directly to the target page if that results in an improvement of the text. Do not "fix" such links if they are not broken. Also, these links should not be replaced with piped links.
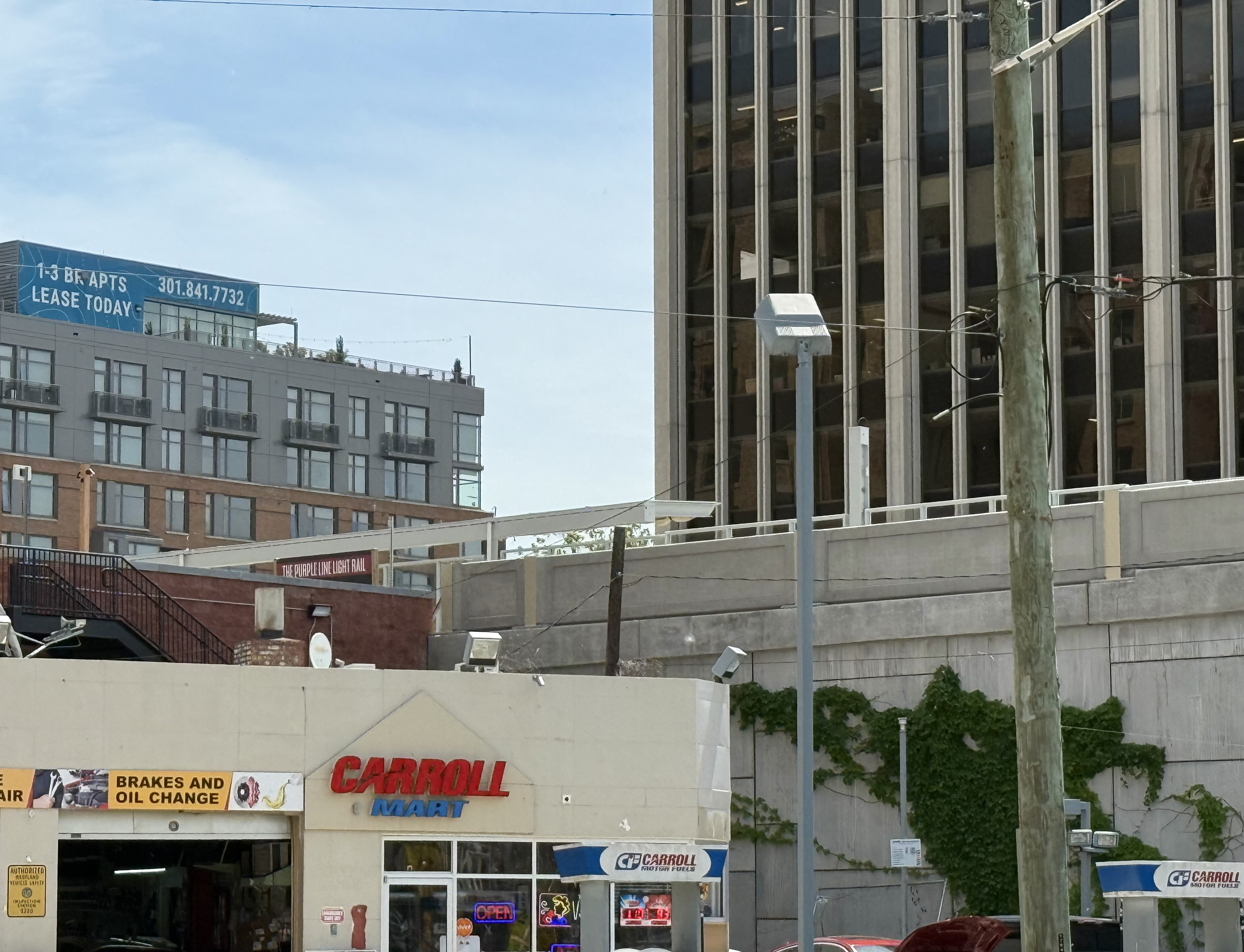
- Station construction in 2025

General information
- Location: 1. redirect Template:Br separated entries; From an alternative hyphenation: This is a redirect from a title with an alternative hyphenation of the target name. Pages that link to this redirect may be updated to link directly to the target page if that results in an improvement of the text. Do not "fix" such links if they are not broken. Also, these links should not be replaced with piped links.
- Coordinates: 38.994713°N 77.076433°W
- Owner: Maryland Transit Administration
- Line: Georgetown Branch
- Platforms: 2 side platforms
- Tracks: 2

Construction
- Parking: None
- Accessible: yes

History
- Opening: 2027 (scheduled)

Services
| Preceding station | Maryland Transit Administration | Following station |
|---|---|---|
| Bethesda Terminus | Purple Line | Lyttonsville toward New Carrollton |
Location

Connecticut Avenue station is an under-construction light rail station in Chevy Chase, Maryland, that will be served by the Purple Line. Located on an elevated grade, it will have two side platforms along the Capital Crescent Trail alignment east of Connecticut Avenue. As of 2026, the Purple Line is planned to open in late 2027.
