= Forest Glen Park, Maryland =

Neighborhood in Silver Spring, Maryland

- Unincorporated community
- Overview map of Forest Glen Park

- Location within Maryland Location within the United States
- Coordinates: 39°00′42″N 77°03′33″W
- Country: United States
- State: Maryland
- County: Montgomery
- Established: 1887
- Founder: Forest Glen Improvement Company
- Elevation: 96 m (315 ft)
- Time zone: UTC-5 (Eastern (EST))
  - Summer (DST): UTC-4 (EDT)
- ZIP Code: 20910
- Area code: 301 & 240
- GNIS feature ID: 590215

Forest Glen Park is an unincorporated community in Montgomery County, Maryland, United States, and a residential neighborhood within the Silver Spring census-designated place. The community is adjacent to Rock Creek, Rock Creek Regional Park, and to the United States Army's Forest Glen Annex.

Forest Glen Park and the Forest Inn at the nearby National Park Seminary were developed in the 1880s, when the area was developed by the Forest Glen Improvement Company. The community was laid out in 1887 as one of Montgomery County's first residential subdivisions. It was developed due to the growth of Washington, D.C. and its proximity to the Baltimore and Ohio Railroad's Metropolitan Branch. Forest Glen Park initially consisted of summer homes and cottages centered around the Forest Inn. Later, Victorian and early to mid-20th-century residences were developed. The Forest Inn became part of the National Park Seminary in 1894, which became the National Park College in 1937. The college was acquired by the U.S. Army in 1942, after which the seminary property became part of the Forest Glen Annex. In 2004, the National Park Seminary was developed into a residential complex.

== Geography ==
Forest Glen Park is an unincorporated community within the census-designated place of Silver Spring and is centered around an intersection, where Forsythe, Wilton, Woodley, and Woodstock Avenues intersect.

The community is located within forested hills to the immediate east of Rock Creek and Rock Creek Regional Park. The Washington D.C. Temple is located approximately 0.39 miles (0.63 km) northwest of Forest Glen Park, and is a prominent landmark visible throughout the community. Forest Glen Park is bordered by the Forest Glen Creek Valley and the Capital Beltway Highway to the north, the historic National Park Seminary and the CSX Metropolitan Subdivision to the east, the United States Army's Forest Glen Annex installation to the southeast, and Rock Creek and Rock Creek Regional Park to the west and south. Forest Glen Park is located approximately 1.4 miles (2.3 km) southeast of Kensington, approximately 1.9 miles (3.1 km) northwest of Downtown Silver Spring, and approximately 2.7 miles (4.3 km) northeast of Bethesda. To the south of Forest Glen Park and Forest Glen Annex, Ireland Creek flows from northeast to southwest through a forested valley into Rock Creek.

The Maryland-National Capital Park and Planning Commission (M-NCPPC) includes Forest Glen Park within the North Silver Spring section of its North and West Silver Spring Master Plan area. The western section of Forest Glen Park consists of single-family residences, and the National Park Seminary section in the east of Forest Glen Park consists of multi-family residences.

== History ==
=== Forest Glen Improvement Company ===
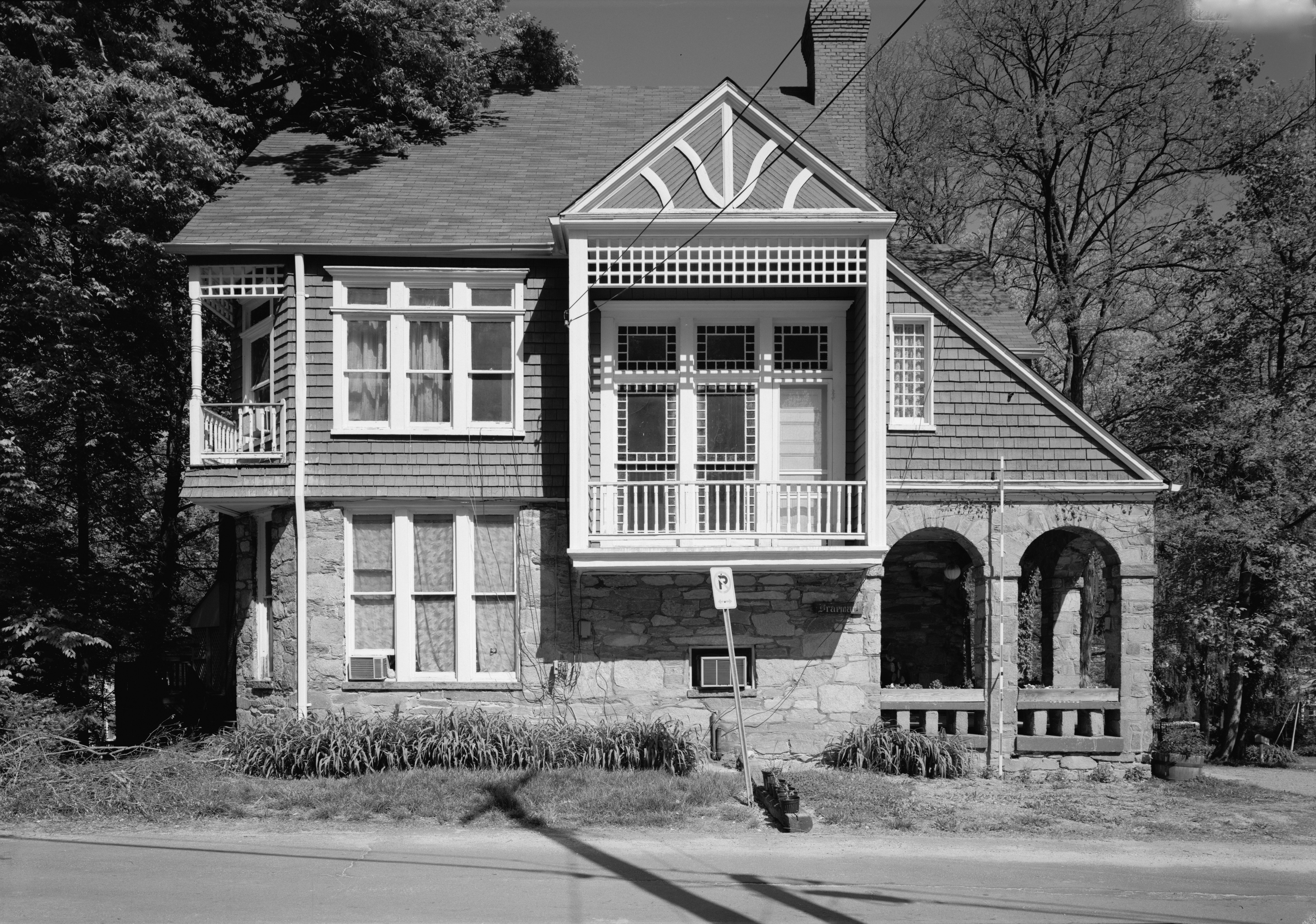
Braemar, one of the original cottages in Forest Glen Park

Forest Glen Park and the Forest Inn, at present day National Park Seminary, were developed by the Forest Glen Improvement Company in 1887. Originally consisting of 166 acres (67 ha), Forest Glen Park was one of the earliest residential subdivisions in Montgomery County and was developed as a result of Washington, D.C.'s growing population. The area was easily accessible to Washington D.C., as it was situated along the Baltimore and Ohio Railroad's Metropolitan Branch. The Forest Glen Improvement Company developed Forest Glen Park as a residential suburb and resort for Washington D.C. residents seeking a more natural environment. The company was recorded in corporate record books on July 15, 1887, and the plat for the Forest Glen Park subdivision was recorded on July 31, 1887. The Forest Glen Improvement Company laid out the neighborhood's avenues to conform with the natural topography and ensured that the lot sizes were large, to allow for "handsome villa sites." The company described the neighborhood as "Washington's most desirable suburb." By April 1887, over two-thirds of the development had been sold. The residential section of Forest Glen Park initially consisted of summer homes and cottages centered around the Forest Inn at the National Park Seminary. It later grew to consist of Victorian-style and early 20th-century residences intermixed with homes built in the 1940s.

=== National Park Seminary and Forest Glen Annex ===
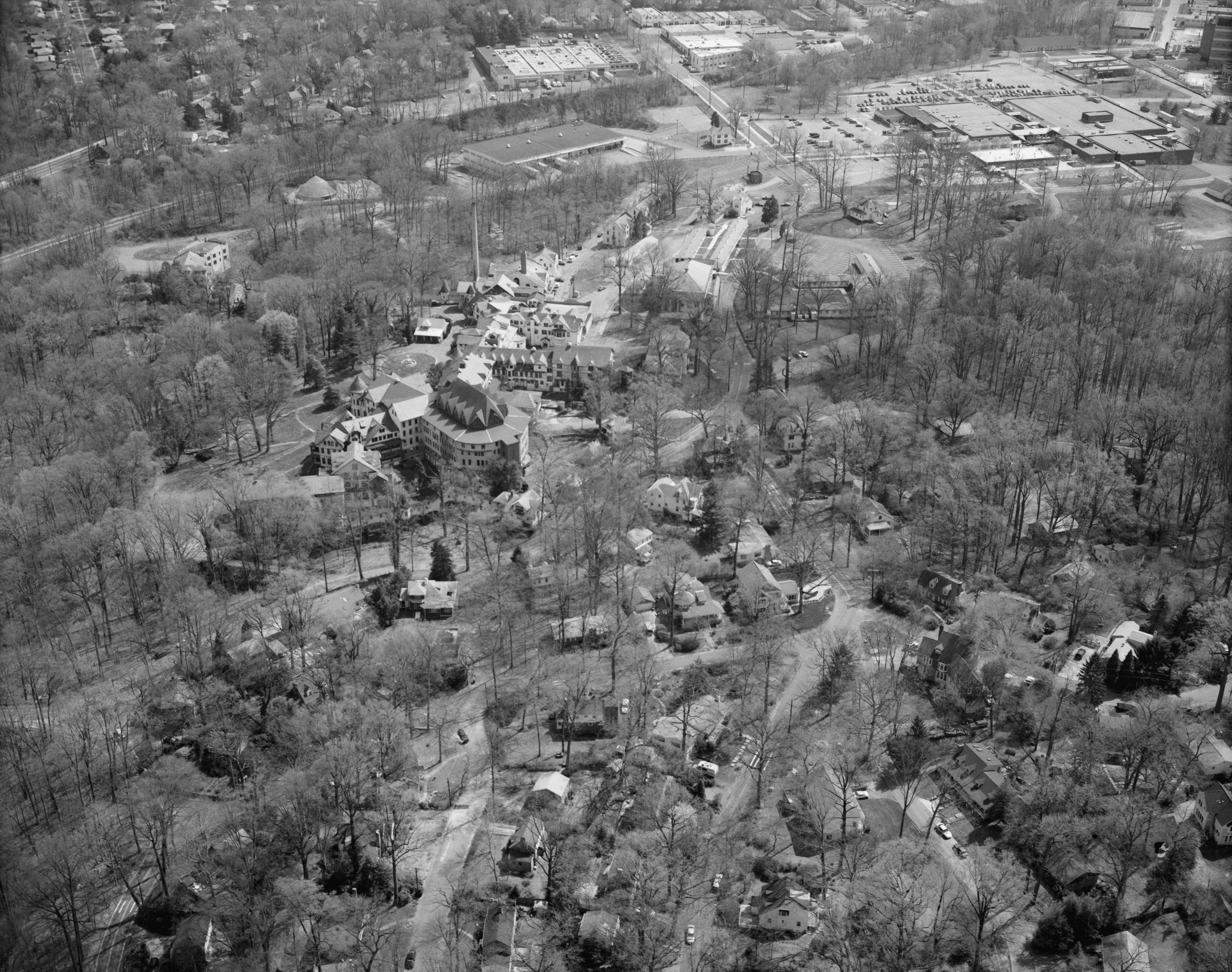
Aerial view of Forest Glen Park and the National Park Seminary

The Forest Inn proved unsuccessful, and the resort property was acquired by Dr. and Mrs. John A. I. Cassedy, who transformed it into a women's college, known as the National Park Seminary. Dr. James E. Ament acquired the seminary in 1916. During his tenure, he expanded the seminary's campus and enlarged its buildings. Dr. Roy Tasco Davis purchased the seminary in 1937, and transitioned the school into a junior college with a business-oriented curriculum, after which it became known as National Park College. During World War II, the War Powers Act of 1941 required Davis to transfer the college to the U.S. Army in 1942. The seminary grounds remained under the ownership of the Army, as part of the Walter Reed Army Medical Center Forest Glen Annex, until 2004. The grounds were listed on the National Register of Historic Places in 1972 as the National Park Seminary Historic District. By the 1980s, many of the seminary buildings had fallen into disrepair, and the Save Our Seminary non-profit was established in 1988 to preserve the historic structures. The General Services Administration transferred the 32-acre (13 ha) seminary property to Montgomery County in 2004. The National Park Seminary was then transferred to a partnership between developers EYA and the Alexander Company, and the grounds were developed into a residential complex.

Command of the Forest Glen Annex transferred from Walter Reed Army Medical Center to Fort Detrick in 2008, following the 2005 Base Realignment and Closure Commission. The Forest Glen Annex is home to the Walter Reed Army Institute of Research and the National Museum of Health and Medicine.

=== Capital Beltway ===
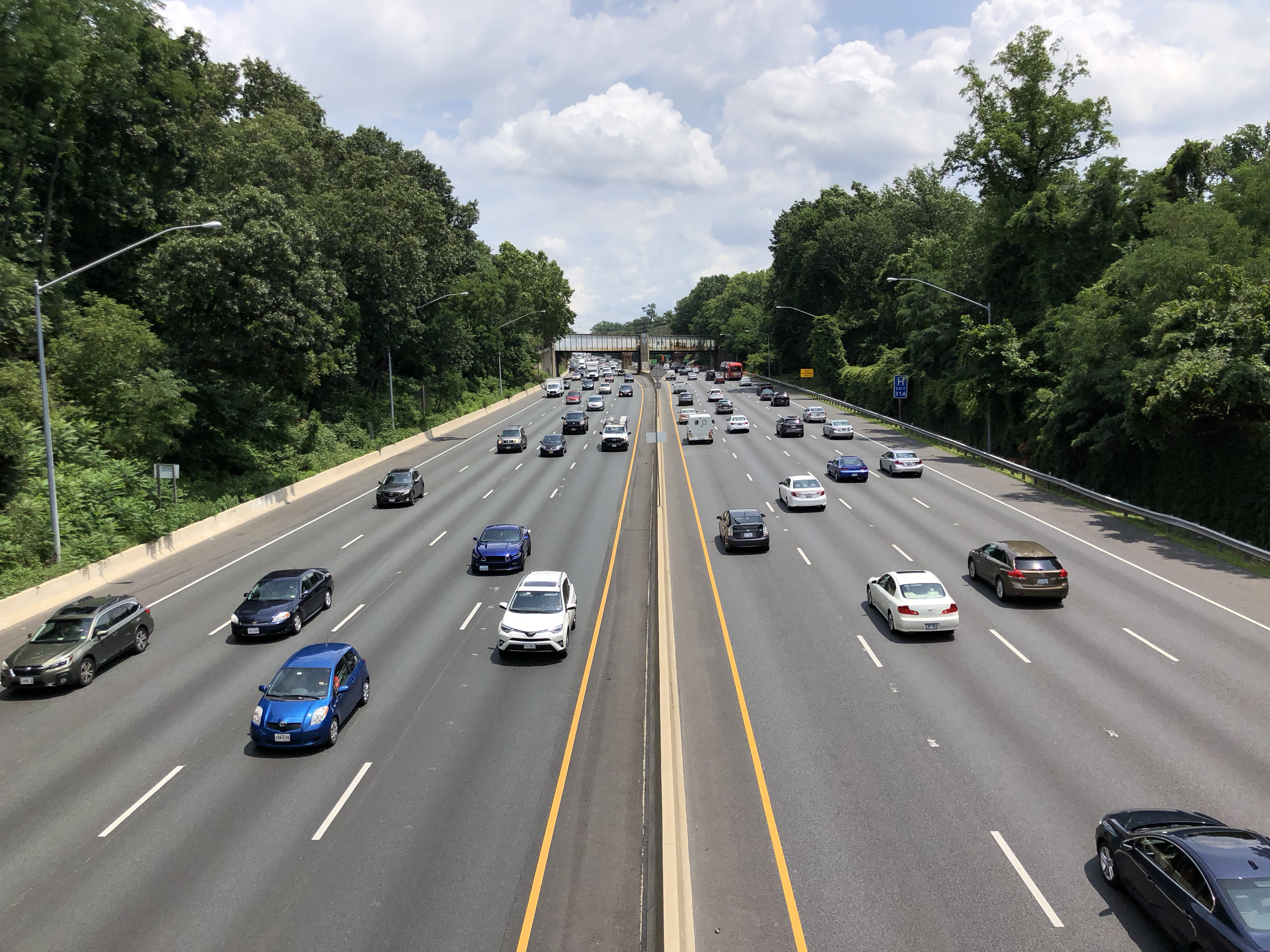
Capital Beltway, viewed from the Linden Lane overpass

The Capital Beltway (I-495) was constructed to the north of Forest Glen Park in the 1960s. The Maryland State Roads Commission built the Linden Lane bridge over the Beltway, for which the commission received an award for bridge design from the American Institute of Steel Construction.

== Government ==
Forest Glen Park is serviced by two civic associations. The western section of the community, which consists of single-family residences, is serviced by the Forest Glen Park Citizens' Association, while the National Park Seminary, which consists of multi-family residences, is serviced by the National Park Seminary Master Association. Forest Glen Park is located within Montgomery County Council's District 1, which is represented by Democrat Andrew Friedson, as of 2021. Forest Glen Park is in Maryland House of Delegates Legislative District 18, and is represented by Democrats Aaron Kaufman, Emily K. Shetty, and Jared Solomon. As part of Legislative District 18, the community is represented in the Maryland Senate by Democrat Jeff Waldstreicher. Forest Glen Park is located within Maryland's 8th congressional district, represented by Jamie Raskin in the United States House of Representatives.

== Education ==
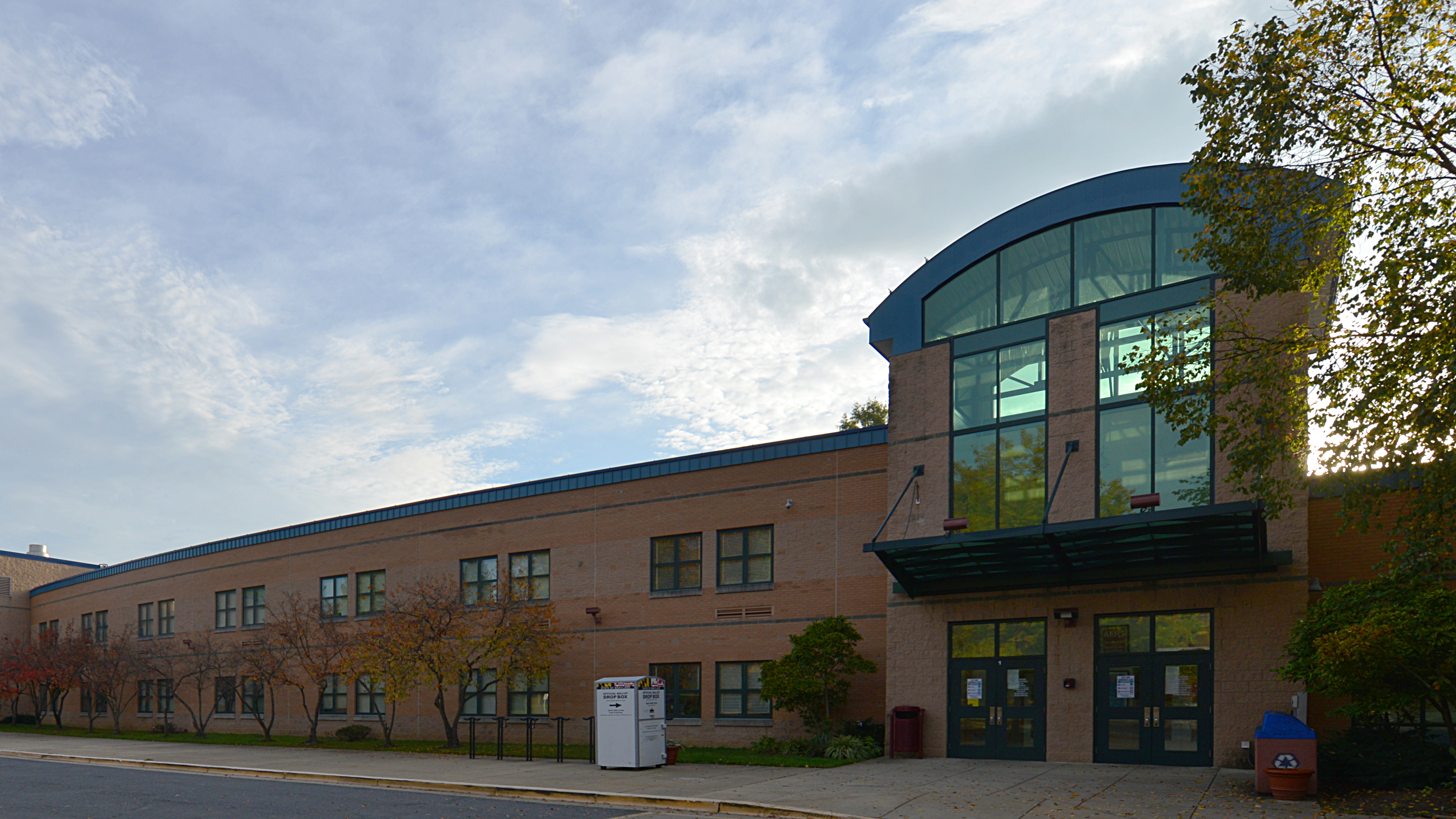
Albert Einstein High School

Forest Glen Park is located within the Montgomery County Public School's school district, and is served by Woodlin Elementary School and Sligo Middle School in Silver Spring, and Albert Einstein High School in Kensington. Albert Einstein High School is part of the Downcounty Consortium, which is a group of five high schools which offer academy programs available to students at any of the five schools. The consortium also includes Einstein, John F. Kennedy High School in Glenmont, Montgomery Blair High School in Silver Spring, Wheaton High School in Wheaton, and Northwood High School in Kemp Mill.

== Transportation ==
Forest Glen Park is serviced by Ride On bus route numbers 4 and 5. Access to the Washington Metro is available on the Red Line in nearby Forest Glen and downtown Silver Spring. By 2023, Purple Line service will be available at the nearby 16th Street–Woodside and Lyttonsville stations.

== Recreation ==
Rock Creek and Rock Creek Regional Park are located immediately to the west and south of Forest Glen Park. Rock Creek Regional Park is an 1,800-acre (730 ha) park operated by the M-NCPPC and the Montgomery County Department of Parks and contains a network of 13 miles (21 km) of trails, connecting to the Rock Creek Hiker-Biker Trail. Rock Creek Regional Park connects with Rock Creek Park at the D.C. border.

== Bibliography ==
- Boyd, T. H. S. (1879). The History of Montgomery County, Maryland, From Its Earliest Settlement in 1650 to 1879. Baltimore: W. K. Boyle and Son, Printers. OCLC 1046583762 – via Internet Archive.
- Forest Glen Improvement Company (1887). Forest Glen Park and The Forest Inn. Washington, D.C.: Forest Glen Improvement Company. OCLC 1045590931 – via Internet Archive.
- Lubar, Steven (1986). "Trolley Lines, Land Speculation and Community-Building: The Early History of Woodside Park, Silver Spring, Maryland". Maryland Historical Magazine. 81 (4). Baltimore: Museum and Library of Maryland History and the Maryland Historical Society: 316–329. ISSN 0025-4258. OCLC 1756756 – via Internet Archive.
- Maryland-National Capital Park and Planning Commission (August 2000). Approved and Adopted North and West Silver Spring Master Plan (PDF). Silver Spring, Maryland: Maryland-National Capital Park and Planning Commission. Archived (PDF) from the original on November 24, 2020.
- Miller, Nancy, ed. (July 10, 1972). National Register of Historic Places Nomination Form: National Park Seminary Historic District (PDF). Crownsville, Maryland: Maryland Historical Trust. Archived (PDF) from the original on October 21, 2020.
- National Park Seminary (1917). A School for Girls. Baltimore: Thomsen-Ellis Company. OCLC 903272604 – via Internet Archive.
- Ott, Cynthia (1999). National Park Seminary (HABS No. MD-1109) (PDF). Washington, D.C.: Historic American Buildings Survey.
- Tamburrino, Tim, ed. (January 2001). Maryland Historical Trust NR-Eligibility Review Form: Forest Glen Historic District (PDF). Annapolis, Maryland: Maryland State Archives. Archived (PDF) from the original on February 23, 2017.
