= AFI Docs =

Annual documentary film festival

Coordinates: 38°59′47″N 77°1′39″W

- Location: Washington, D.C., and Silver Spring, Maryland, U.S.
- Founded: 2003
- No. of films: 103 as of 2017

The AFI Docs, formerly Silverdocs, was an American international documentary film festival held in Silver Spring, Maryland, and Washington, D.C. from 2003 until 2022, when it was merged into AFI Fest.

== History ==
Silverdocs was founded in 2003 by the American Film Institute and the Discovery Channel.

In 2013 it was merged into AFI Fest, a Los Angeles-based film festival.

Its last edition took place in 2022, after the COVID-19 pandemic had caused it to be held fully online in 2020 and mostly online in 2021, when it was fully merged into AFI Fest. Former employees of the festival, Sky Sitney and Jamie Shor, went on to create a new documentary film festival in Washington DC, DC/DOX, in 2023.

== Description ==
The festival was held for five days in June at the AFI Silver Theatre in Silver Spring, Maryland,and other locations in and near Washington, D.C.

Several organizations usually took part in the events: BBC, CPB, Discovery Channel, TLC, Animal Planet, The Ford Foundation, HBO, Latino Public Broadcasting, John D. and Catherine T. MacArthur Foundation, Miramax, National Black Programming Consortium, National Geographic, PBS, the Sundance Institute, The Weinstein Company.

== Notable people ==
In 2013, the AFI Docs Advisory Board comprised: Ken Burns, Davis Guggenheim, Chris Hegedus, Werner Herzog, Barbara Kopple, Spike Lee, Albert Maysles, Errol Morris, D A Pennebaker, and Frederick Wiseman.

Other notable people involved with AFI Docs included:

- AOL vice-chairman emeritus Ted Leonsis
- BET co-founder Sheila Johnson
- Former Vice President Al Gore

== Award recipients ==
Yoruba Richen won the Audience Award in 2013 for The New Black, which looked at about the African-American community response to marriage equality initiatives.
