= Woodside Park (Silver Spring, Maryland) =

Neighborhood in the United States

- Neighborhood
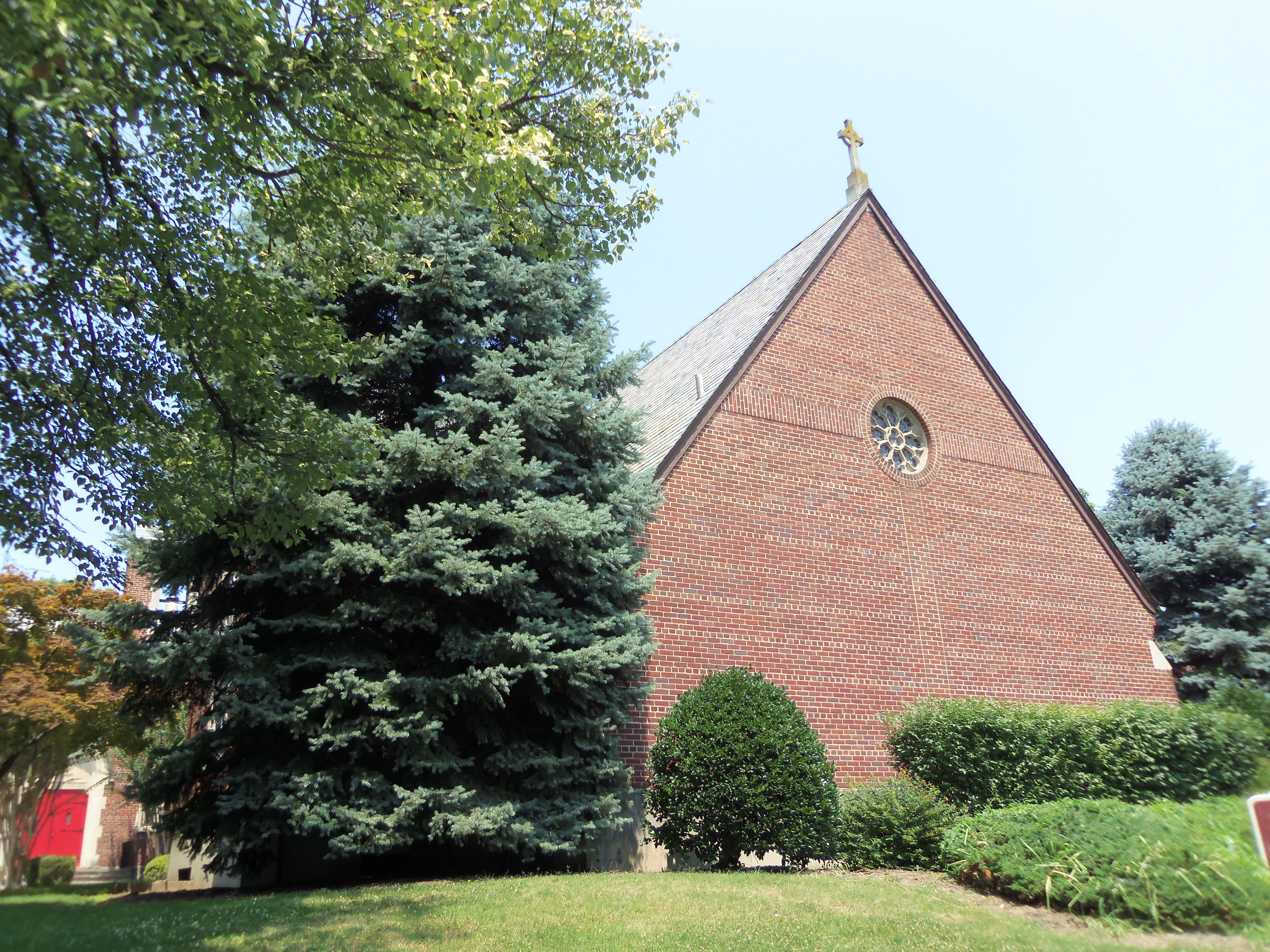
- Saint Luke Lutheran Church in Woodside Park (2012)

- Location of Silver Spring
- Coordinates: 39°0′23.4000″N 77°1′49.0800″W
- Country: United States
- State: Maryland
- County: Montgomery County
- City: Silver Spring
- Zip Code: 20910
- Area code: Area code 301
- Website: http://woodsidepark.org

Woodside Park is a neighborhood in Silver Spring, Maryland, in the United States.

== Early history ==
Woodside Park began as Alton Farm, the country estate of Crosby Stuart Noyes, a prominent Washingtonian and owner of the Washington Evening Star newspaper. Upon his death in 1908, his will gave the land to his children with a provision that his widow could live on the estate until her death. She survived until 1914.

In 1922, the Noyes children eventually sold the property to the Woodside Development Corporation. The corporation divided the farm into lots of about one acre each; most original lots would later be subdivided into parcels of a half-acre or less.

From the 1920s to the 1960s, racially restrictive covenants were used in Woodside Park to exclude African-Americans. The racial covenants prohibited homeowners from selling or leasing their property to "any one of a race whose death rate is at a higher percentage than the white race." In practice, such euphemistic restrictions were harshly enacted against Black Americans specifically. Restrictions against other minority groups, such as Jews and Asians, were not given legal standing in deeds in Woodside Park, although such deeds were enforced in other Maryland suburbs. A 1923 covenant for Section 1 of Woodside Park reads: "For the purposes of sanitation and health, neither the said party of the second part, nor his heirs or assigns, shall or will sell or lease the said land to any one of a race whose death rate is at a higher percentage than the white race."

== Location ==
Woodside Park is located just north of downtown of Silver Spring, one of the oldest suburbs of Washington, D.C. Its boundaries are Georgia Avenue (State Route 97) on the west, Spring Street to the south, Colesville Road (US Route 29) to the east, and Dale Drive and Columbia Boulevard on the north. It also includes one block of Clement Road north of Dale Drive and Clement Place. It borders the neighborhoods of Woodside, Woodside Forest, North Woodside, and Seven Oaks-Evanswood. It shares a boundary with the Silver Spring business district.

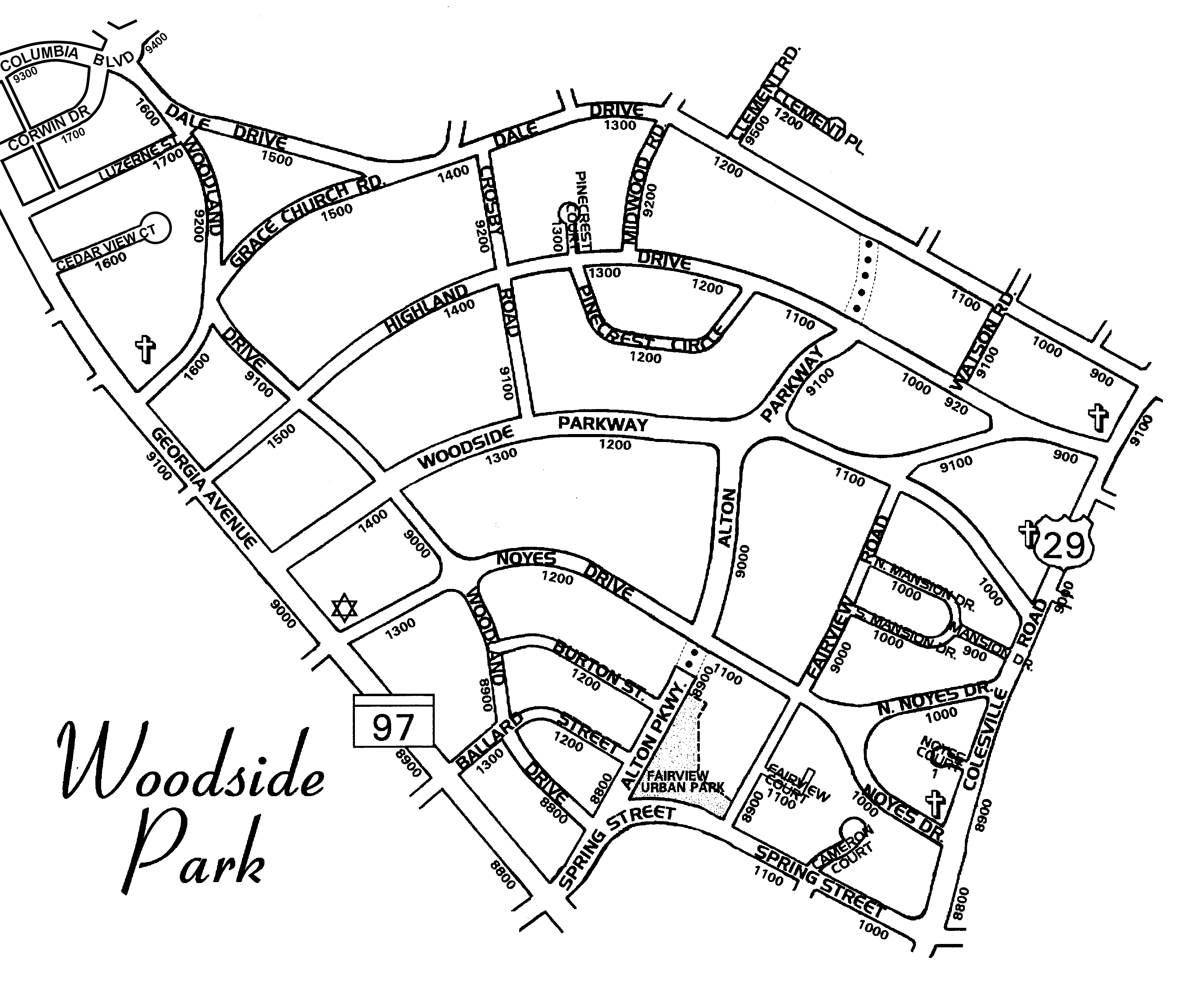
Map of Woodside Park, Maryland

== Description ==
Woodside Park is characterized by its park-like setting and roads that generally followed the contours of the land instead of a grid.

It originally had a number of streams; most have been moved underground into pipes.

The styles of homes in the neighborhood vary, with examples of most of the styles of residential architecture popular through the 20th century.

The neighborhood maintains the Woodside Park Civic Association (WPCA), which publishes a monthly newsletter, called The Vo!ce from September through June. It also sponsors an "Oktoberfest" and Halloween with pumpkin carving and costumes in October, as well as an annual picnic in June.

Woodside Park is home to an Orthodox Jewish community, centered around the Woodside Synagogue Ahavas Torah (WSAT) located on Georgia Avenue. The Woodside Synagogue is an Orthodox synagogue dating from 1974. All of the Woodside Park neighborhood is located within the Shepherd Park/Woodside Community Eruv, which encompasses most of incorporated Silver Spring and parts of Northwest DC.
