= Sam Eig =

American real estate developer (1898–1982)

Samuel Eig
- Born: December 17, 1898; Smilovichi, Minsk Governorate, Russian Empire
- Died: December 25, 1982 (aged 84); Gaithersburg, Maryland, United States
- Occupation: Real estate developer
- Known for: Development of Silver Spring, Maryland
- Spouse: Esther Koenick

Samuel Eig (December 17, 1898 – December 25, 1982) was an American real estate developer active in the Washington, D.C. metropolitan area.

== Biography ==
Eig was born in Smilovichi, Minsk Governorate, Russian Empire (present-day Belarus) to a Jewish family. In 1914, he immigrated to the United States arriving in Seattle, Washington, then moving to New York City, New York, and then Washington, D.C. He worked various jobs as a bellboy, busboy, construction worker, and butcher's assistant. After a failed investment in a grocery store, he opened a liquor store in the 1930s whose profits enabled him to buy a distillery. Using the earnings from this business, he started to invest in real estate in then-undeveloped Silver Spring, Maryland. In 1944, he purchased the Silver Spring Shopping Center; and in 1946, he built the Eig Building. Eig was a proponent of further development in Silver Spring and was an active member of the Silver Spring Board of Trade. In the late 1930s, he personally developed 30 housing lots in Rock Creek Forest, after being denied financing from local banks. Aware that people preferred to move to places that were more established, Eig donated land to build community centers and churches including a Red Cross building and Holy Cross Hospital in Silver Spring. Eig was successful and by the late 1940s, his real estate holdings were valued at over $100 million (worth over $1 billion in 2019). He later expanded into hotels, building the Washingtonian Center in Gaithersburg, Maryland in 1957 and the Georgian Motel in Silver Spring in 1961. Because of antisemitism in Washington, D.C., Eig was denied access to developing homes in some of DC's most desirable neighborhoods. Until the passage of the 1968 Fair Housing Act, Eig and his wife Esther used racially restrictive covenants to exclude African Americans and other racial minorities from suburbs they helped develop. Eig referred to the whites-only Rock Creek Forest neighborhood as "ideally located and sensibly restricted." A typical racially restrictive deed in Rock Creek Forest from 1941 states that "No person of any race other than the Caucasian race shall use or occupy any building or any lot, except that this covenant shall not prevent occupancy by domestic servants of a different race domiciled with an owner or tenant."

Sam Eig Highway, a continuation of Interstate 370, was named in his honor. He was a life member of B'nai Israel Congregation of Rockville. Eig died in 1982 at the age of 83.
