= Lyttonsville station =

Future light rail station in Maryland

Lyttonsville
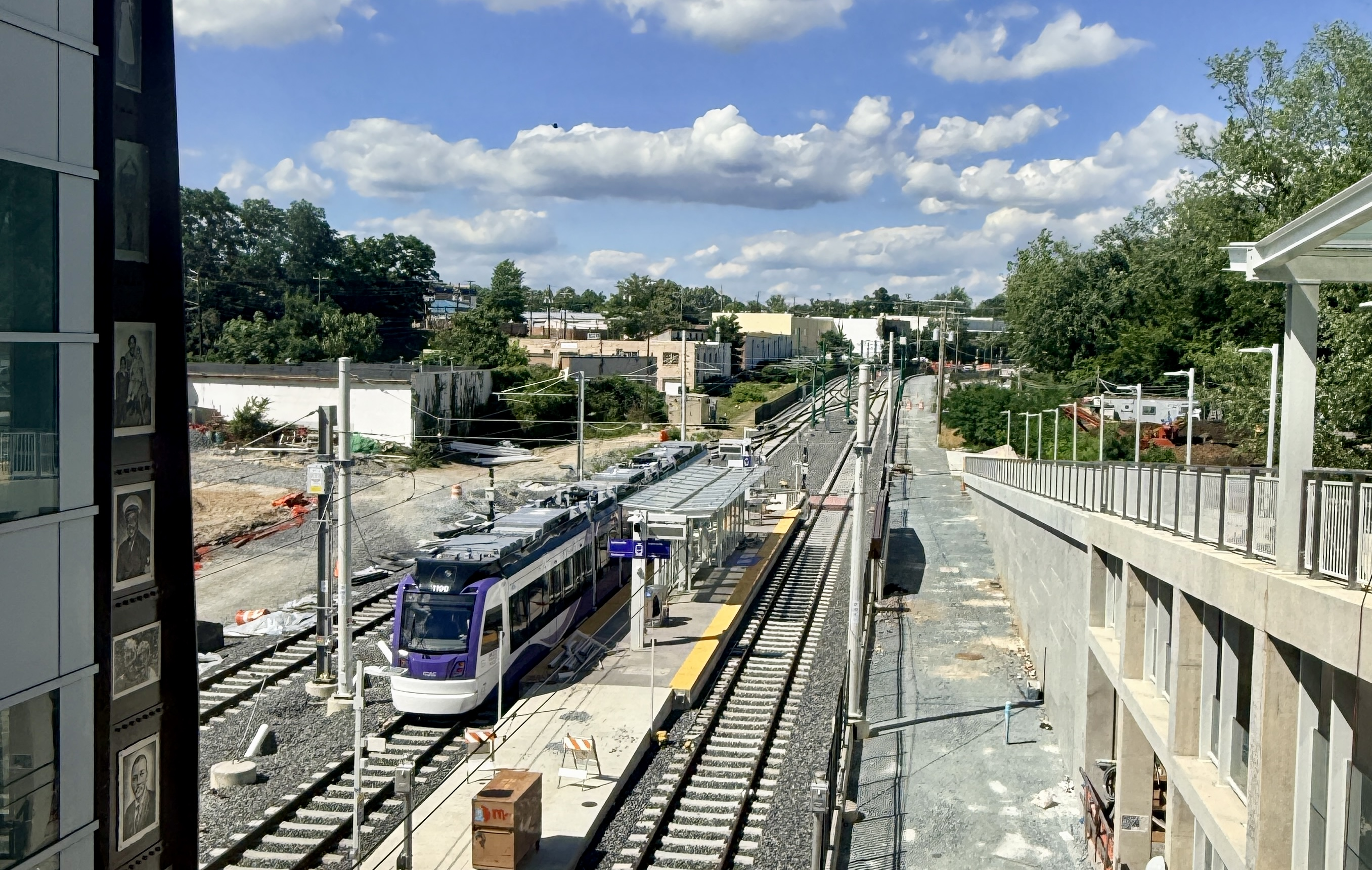
- Station construction and test train in 2026

General information
- Location: Lyttonsville Place; Silver Spring, Maryland
- Coordinates: 39.00036°N 77.05388°W
- Owner: Maryland Transit Administration
- Platforms: 1 island platform
- Tracks: 2

Construction
- Parking: None
- Accessible: yes

History
- Opening: 2027 (scheduled)

Services
Preceding station	Maryland Transit Administration	Following station
Connecticut Avenue toward Bethesda	Purple Line	16th Street–Woodside toward New Carrollton
Location

Lyttonsville station is an under-construction light rail station in the Lyttonsville neighborhood of Silver Spring, Maryland, that will be served by the Purple Line. The station will have an island platform just north of the Lyttonsville Place overpass. It will feature steel girders from the historic Talbot Avenue bridge. As of 2026, the Purple Line is planned to open in late 2027.
