= AFI Silver =

Movie theater in Silver Spring, Maryland

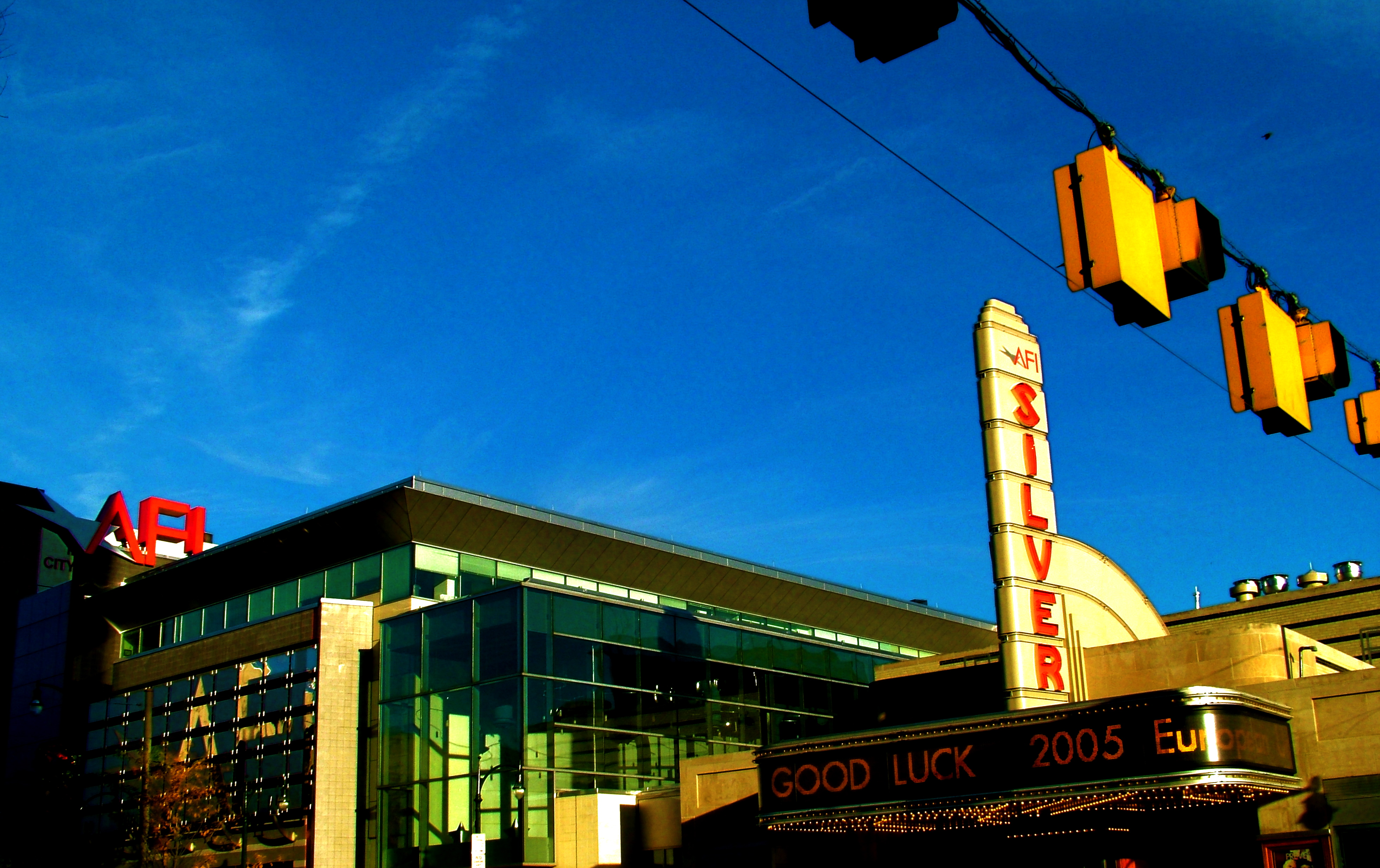
- The theater in 2005

- Location within Maryland

General information
- Status: Operating
- Type: Theater
- Architectural style: Art Deco
- Location: 8633 Colesville Road, Silver Spring, Maryland, United States
- Coordinates: 38.9967°N 77.0276°W
- Completed: 1938

Design and construction
- Architect: John Eberson

Other information
- Seating type: Stadium in Smaller Theaters Flat in Large Theater with Free Premium Seating in back (Awarded on a first come first served basis)
- Seating capacity: 400, 200, and 75

Website
- www.afi.com/silver/

AFI Silver Theatre and Cultural Center (commonly called as AFI Silver) is a three-screen movie theater complex in downtown Silver Spring, Maryland, north of Washington, D.C. It is operated by the American Film Institute.

It occupies the former home of the 1,100-seat Silver Theatre, whose 1938 building was designed by movie palace architect John Eberson. It was originally owned by Warner Bros. Pictures. The Silver Theatre closed in 1985, and the building stood empty until 2001, when restoration began.

As of 2017, the theater now shows "upward of 600 movies per year" including "first-run features, classics, obscure archival prints, rarities from global cinema and the odd locally made one-off".

Its main auditorium hosts the DC Metro area's third-largest commercial movie theater screen, and the second-largest commercial movie theater screen outside of the Smithsonian Institution after the Uptown Theater in Cleveland Park.

From 2003 to 2022, the theater hosted an annual documentary festival called Silverdocs and then AFI Docs.
