= 16th Street–Woodside station =

Future light rail station in Maryland

16th Street–Woodside
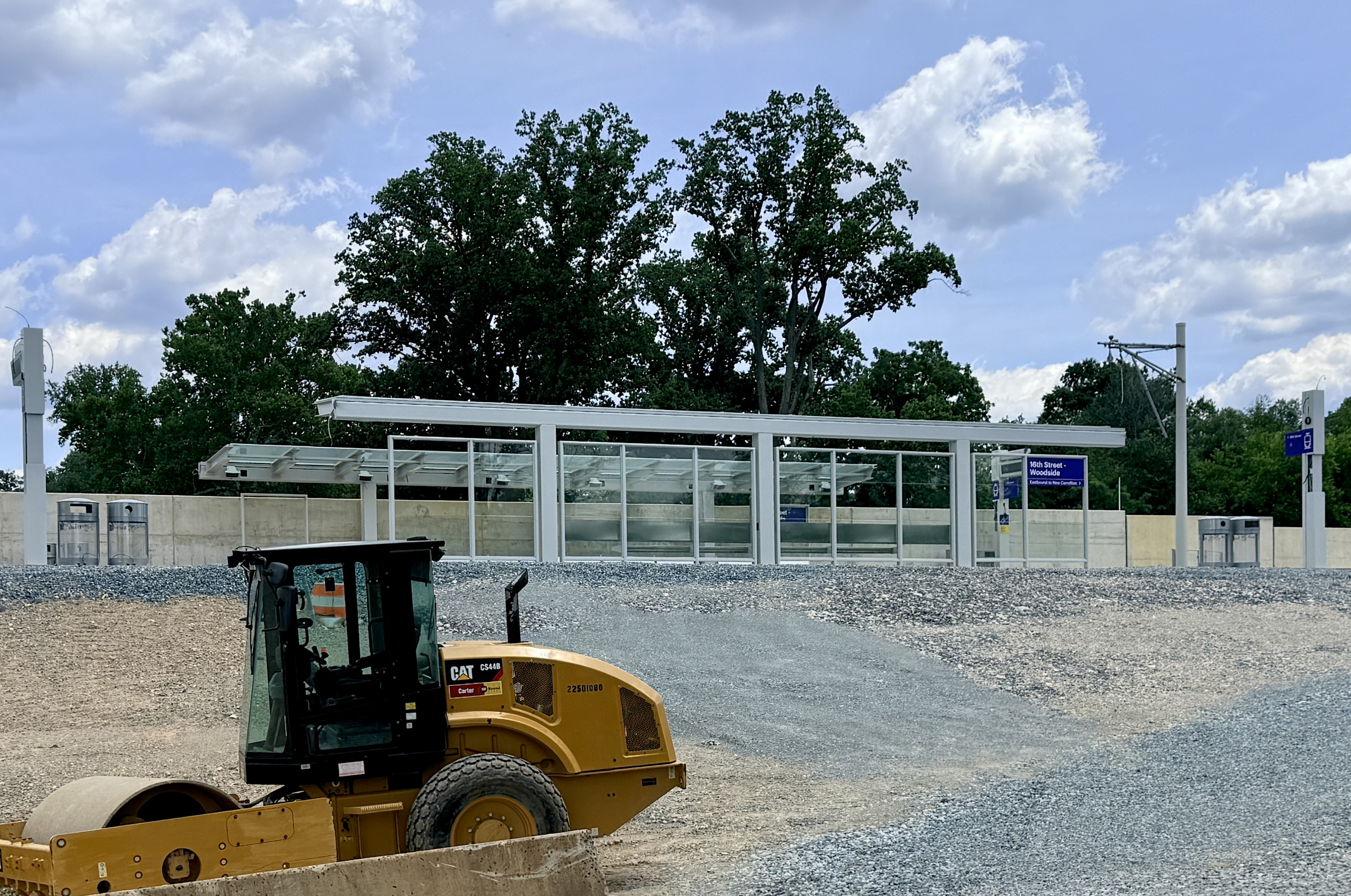
- Station construction in June 2026

General information
- Location: Woodside, Silver Spring, Maryland
- Coordinates: 38.998425°N 77.037991°W
- Owner: Maryland Transit Administration
- Operator: Maryland Transit Solutions
- Platforms: 2 side platforms
- Tracks: 2

Construction
- Parking: None
- Accessible: Yes

History
- Opening: 2027 (scheduled)

Services
Preceding station	Maryland Transit Administration	Following station
Lyttonsville toward Bethesda	Purple Line	Silver Spring toward New Carrollton
Former services at Woodside station
Preceding station	Baltimore and Ohio Railroad	Following station
Kensington toward Chicago	Main Line	Silver Spring toward Jersey City
Forest Glen toward Chicago	Main Line	Silver Spring toward Jersey City
Location

16th Street–Woodside station is a light rail station under construction in the Woodside neighborhood of Silver Spring, Maryland. To be located on 16th Street, it will be part of Maryland's Purple Line, which is scheduled to open in late 2027.

== History ==
=== Earlier B&O station ===
The Purple Line at Woodside follows the right-of-way of the Metropolitan Branch of the Baltimore and Ohio Railroad (B&O), which opened in 1872.

In 1889, Benjamin Leighton—lawyer, banker, real estate developer, and future dean of Howard Law School—platted the Woodside subdivision. The following year, he built a station for the B&O at Woodside to increase the value of his land. Designed in Victorian style, the station sat on the north side of the tracks at 3rd Avenue, between its present-day intersections with Ballard Street and Noyes Drive. After 1897, pedestrians could connect to the Forest Glen Trolley station three blocks away, at the intersection of present-day Georgia Avenue and Ballard Street.

The station burned down in the 1920s. The B&O later built a section house at the site, near the junction with the Georgetown Branch.

=== Purple Line station ===
At Woodside, the Purple Line runs south of the tracks of the CSX railroad's Metropolitan Subdivision, which run south of the Capital Crescent Trail. It will have two side platforms.
