= Capital Crescent Trail =

Rail trail in greater Washington, D.C.

Coordinates: 39°00′09″N 77°02′47″W

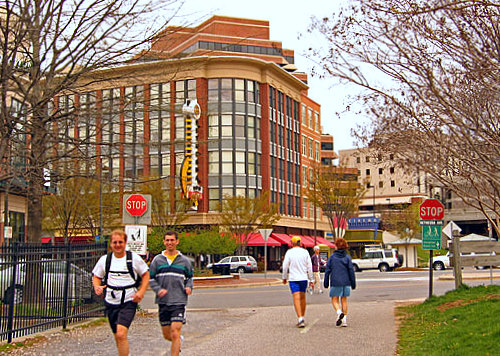
- Capital Crescent Trail in Bethesda, Maryland
- Length: 7.04 miles (11.33 km)
- Location: Washington metropolitan area
- Established: December 1996
- Trailheads: South: Georgetown, North: Bethesda, Future: Silver Spring
- Use: Hiking, Biking
- Surface: Asphalt
- Website: www.cctrail.org

The Capital Crescent Trail (CCT) is a 7.04-mile (11.33 km), shared-use rail trail that runs from Georgetown in Washington, D.C., to Bethesda, Maryland. An extension of the trail from Bethesda to Silver Spring along a route formerly known as the Georgetown Branch Trail is being built as part of the Purple Line light rail project.

One of the most heavily used rail trails in the United States, the Capital Crescent Trail serves more than 1 million walkers, joggers, bikers, skateboarders and rollerbladers each year. In 2005, it was named one of the "21 great places that show how transportation can enliven a community" by The Project for Public Spaces.

== Trail route ==
From the trailhead in downtown Bethesda, the CCT heads south-southwest along the Little Falls Branch to the Potomac River and the District line. It goes over the River Road Bridge and past the site of Fort Sumner, a Civil War-era fort. It then moves through the Dalecarlia area, traveling under the Washington Aqueduct conduit at the Dalecarlia Tunnel, past the Dalecarlia Reservoir and through the grounds of the Dalecarlia Treatment Plant over the Dalecarlia Bridge.

Crossing into Washington, D.C., it turns southeast, dropping from the Palisades neighborhood over the C&O Canal on the Arizona Avenue Railway Bridge, and down to the banks of the Potomac. It then runs between the Potomac and the C&O Canal, past Fletcher's Boathouse and the Foundry Branch Tunnel, into Georgetown to its terminus at the west end of Water Street NW.

Until 2017, the trail connected to the Georgetown Branch Trail through the 800-foot Air Rights Tunnel. The GBT emerged in Chevy Chase, headed east on an unpaved, crushed-stone surface, crossed Rock Creek on a trestle, and ended at Lyttonsville Junction, about one mile (1.6 km) west of downtown Silver Spring.

== History ==
=== Pre-construction ===
The trail runs on the abandoned right-of-way of the Georgetown Branch of the Baltimore and Ohio Railroad. Partially built in 1892 and completed in 1910, the branch line served the Potomac Electric Power Company (PEPCO), the Washington Mill, and federal government buildings, but became obsolete as Georgetown's waterfront changed. Ten years after the Chessie System bought the B&O in 1973, the railroad announced that it would ask the Interstate Commerce Commission to allow it to abandon the Georgetown Branch. Within a year, the Washington Area Bicyclist Association contacted the Maryland National Capital Parks and Planning Commission about turning it into a trail—an idea perhaps first proposed in the 1975 Bethesda Central Business District Sector Plan and then detailed again in the 1980 Bethesda-Chevy Chase Master Plan. In January 1986, WABA completed a feasibility study of the trail, and the next month advocates chose the name "Capital Crescent Trail."

The last train ran on the line in June 1985, when Chessie officials determined that one of its bridges was unsafe. At that time, the only customers were the General Services Administration, which used the railroad to bring coal to a heating plant at 29th and K streets, and a small building-supply company in Bethesda. Three months later, and shortly after 75 feet of the rail line were damaged in flooding, Chessie officials said that they would formally request ICC permission to abandon the line. Railroad officials said they were losing money on the line and that it detracted from the scenery around the Washington Harbor development, of which Chessie was a part owner. Local governments and the National Park Service began trying to acquire the land for a trail and transit corridor as early as 1985, when the ICC informed them that the National Trails System Act of 1968 could not be used to force Chessie to turn the land over. Problems with the line were exacerbated after the Potomac River flood in November undermined about 75 feet of roadbed near Fletcher's Boathouse. Before the abandonment, Chessie made plans to sell the section in the Palisades to a developer, and offered to sell it for $15 million. Chessie, by then part of the CSX Corporation, asked for permission to abandon the line in April 1986. The abandonment was completed in April 1988 and most of the track removed by the mid-1990s, following a 1990 decision to not allow a recreational excursion train on the tracks.

Advocates for turning the railroad into a trail, including the Greater Bethesda-Chevy Chase Coalition and the newly formed Coalition for the Capital Crescent Trail began to lobby local and federal officials to do so, putting together a Concept Plan in 1988. Despite opposition from neighbors and those who wanted the right-of-way for mass transit, an excursion train, or other development, they convinced the Montgomery County government, along with a coalition of developers and government agencies, to purchase the right-of-way from the D.C. line to Silver Spring. Montgomery County purchased the right-of-way on December 16, 1988, four days after the ICC approved the purchase and transfer, under the Trails System Act. CSX sold the Maryland section of the line for $10.5 million. The following year, the Montgomery County Council voted to build a trolley and bike trail along the Bethesda-Silver Spring section of the right-of-way.

In December 1988, Kingdon Gould, Jr., purchased an option to buy the railroad right-of-way after failing to buy it outright for the purpose of restarting the railroad. However, once Montgomery County made a deal to buy their section of the trail, Gould placed the 3.3 miles (5.3 km) section in the District of Columbia, between Georgetown and the D.C./Maryland boundary, into a trust called the Georgetown Branch Foundation until the National Park Service could purchase it outright for $11 million in 1990. The D.C. section then became a component of the Chesapeake and Ohio Canal National Historical Park. In 1991, advocates John Dugger and Henri Bartholomot helped secure federal funding through the Intermodal Surface Transportation Efficiency Act to develop the Maryland portion of the trail. The funding also paid for the D.C. portion and the rehabilitation of the Arizona Avenue Trestle.

=== Construction ===
In 1990, before any of the formal work began, volunteers built a wooden deck over the Arizona Avenue Railroad Bridge.

With the right-of-way and funding secured, the groundbreaking for the trail was held on September 30, 1992, when Montgomery County leaders symbolically pried loose one of the railroad ties. The work was performed in four major phases and several minor ones:

- Bethesda Avenue to Little Falls Parkway. This section was funded by Montgomery County's departments of transportation and parks and by businessmen John Ourisman and Tom Miller. The route was cleared by PEPCO in exchange for easement considerations elsewhere and to reimburse the community after residents complained about power-line work on nearby Arlington Road. It became the first section to open when the ribbon was cut on March 30, 1994.
- Dalecarlia Reservoir to Georgetown. Work on the D.C. section of the trail, except for the Arizona Avenue Trestle, ran from 1993 to late 1994. It was handled by the National Park Service.
- Little Falls Parkway to MacArthur Boulevard. This phase was executed entirely in 1994: the tracks were removed in the spring, the section was paved in the summer, and the work was completed by the end of the year. It was built by Montgomery County, with financial assistance from the state of Maryland and the federal government and planning from the Maryland-National Capital Park and Planning Commission.
- MacArthur to the District line. Arlington County built this section in late 1994 and early 1995 because they were doing unrelated work on pipelines in the area.

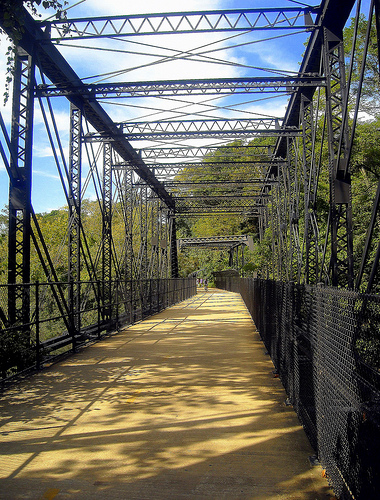
The trail includes the Arizona Avenue Railway Bridge, which crosses the C&O Canal in The Palisades neighborhood of Washington, D.C.

In late 1995, the concrete deck of the Arizona Avenue trestle was poured, replacing the five-year-old wooden deck. In June 1996, the Arizona Avenue Trestle was opened, followed in November by the trail bridge over River Road.

The last piece of the trail to be completed, the Dalecarlia Bridge, includes part of a bridge that took the Georgetown Branch over the Washington and Great Falls Electric Railway and it was designed to go over a road connecting two parts of the Washington Aqueduct reservation. The summer of 1996 saw the removal of the last three miles of track, from Silver Spring to Bethesda. In December, dedication ceremonies formally opened the River Road Bridge, the Dalecarlia Bridge, and the full Capital Crescent trail.

An unpaved trail connection to Norton Street NW and a staircase connection to Potomac Avenue NW were built after 1997 and before 2003. A plaza along River Road, named for Neal Potter, was opened on November 3, 2018. It has benches, stone sitting walls, a curving pathway, a red metal pergola, bike racks, a repair station, a display with trail information, and a plaque to honor Potter. The plaza was envisioned by architecture students at The Catholic University of America in 2006 and 2007. Their professor, Iris Miller, called the plaza "a tribute to persistence."

A second, 1,300-square-foot public plaza near Bethesda and Woodmont avenues, Ourisman Plaza, was built in 2019 as part of an agreement with John Ourisman's adjacent car dealership, which had built a garage that encroached on the trail. As part of the deal, they also agreed to move their driveway farther from the trail's Bethesda Avenue entrance, to install decorative screening around the expanded garage to create a more appealing facade facing the trail, and to widen about a quarter-mile section of the trail about two feet to 16 feet.

The section from Bethesda to Silver Spring was delayed due to continued debate over the proposed trolley. It later opened as the Georgetown Branch Interim Trail. As of 2023, the section is under construction as part of the work on the Purple Line.

=== Georgetown Branch Interim Trail ===
The opening of the Bethesda-Silver Spring section was delayed by lawsuits and debate over what to do with it. A year after the right-of-way was purchased, Gov. William Donald Schaefer (D) offered $70 million to build a trolley line on it. Later, a combined transit/trail corridor was added to the county's master plan. This led to several battles between those who supported transit and those who did not, with those who supported a trail left in the middle. There were also lawsuits over the ownership of the line; adjacent homeowners, the Chevy Chase Land Company, and Columbia Country Club all sued the county. The county won all the suits and pursued construction of an interim trail while transit options were considered.

In 1995, the Montgomery County Council voted unanimously to fund the $390,000 Georgetown Branch Interim Trail on the section between the Wisconsin Avenue Tunnel and Kansas Avenue, but not on the trestle. In early 1996, work began to pull up the tracks and ties and lay a crushed stone surface. The Columbia Country Club demanded that fences be built along the trail and threatened to sue. Trail advocates objected, but the council voted in June to spend an additional $100,000, on top of $40,000 already appropriated. Though the county-owned land was 100 feet wide, the fences would create a corridor 16 to 25 feet wide for one-third of a mile. At the same time, they funded two golf cart crossings below the trail and bought land at Elm Park and Kansas Avenue needed to connect the trail.

On May 17, 1997, the Georgetown Branch Interim Trail opened from the east side of the 1910 Air Rights Tunnel in Bethesda to Stewart Avenue in Silver Spring. The tunnel itself opened on August 15, 1998, connecting the interim and permanent sections.

In June 2000, Montgomery County committed $1.3 million to repair the Rock Creek Trestle, which had been damaged by arson and fire, most notably in 1967, and open it for trail use. The trestle was dedicated for trail use on May 31, 2003.

Montgomery County began studying transit options for the corridor as early as 1986 and continued to study, litigate and debate it, until work began in 2017. A trolley between Bethesda and Silver Spring went through several iterations including the Georgetown Branch Light Rail Transit, the Inner Purple Line, the Bi-County Transitway and finally the Purple Line: a light rail train from Bethesda to New Carrollton, Maryland. Each iteration included plans to pave a parallel extension of the trail between Bethesda and Silver Spring and using the existing Air Rights Tunnel. However, in 2011 MTA announced that the cost of building the extended trail would be $103 million, much more than the previously estimated $65 million. Half of the cost would result from widening the Air Rights Tunnel to include the trail with the train. Instead, the county made plans for a second tunnel for the trail to run parallel to the transit tunnel and in part, under a new Air Rights building.

On September 5, 2017, the Georgetown Branch Interim Trail was closed so that work could begin on the Purple Line light rail.

=== Capital Crescent Trail extension ===
As of 2026, the Purple Line project is extending the Capital Crescent Trail as a paved 12-foot-wide off-road shared-use path with 2-foot buffers from the current trailhead in Bethesda to Silver Spring, partly along the former Georgetown Branch Interim Trail right-of-way.

Construction of the extension began in 2017. A mostly on-street detour route was signed as the "Georgetown Branch Trail Detour". Plans called for completion in 2022, but construction was delayed, along with the Purple Line itself.

A 670-foot section of the extended trail opened on May 24, 2024. The section includes the new Talbot Avenue Bridge, a delineated path on the west side of the CSX tracks, a wide sidewalk across the bridge, and a short stub trail on the east side of the tracks.

As of October 2026, the Elm Street-to-Connecticut Avenue section was scheduled to open in spring 2027. Work on the section was slowed several times, including by County Executive Marc Elrich's 2024 decision to omit the tunnel from the county's capital budget. (The County Council, which had rebuffed Elrich's similar moves in 2020 and 2022, did not do so in 2024, when estimated costs for the tunnel rose from $55 million to $82 million.) In April 2026, plans called for opening the section that fall.

== See also ==
- Metropolitan Branch Trail
