= Woodside (Silver Spring, Maryland) =

Neighborhood in the United States

- Neighborhood
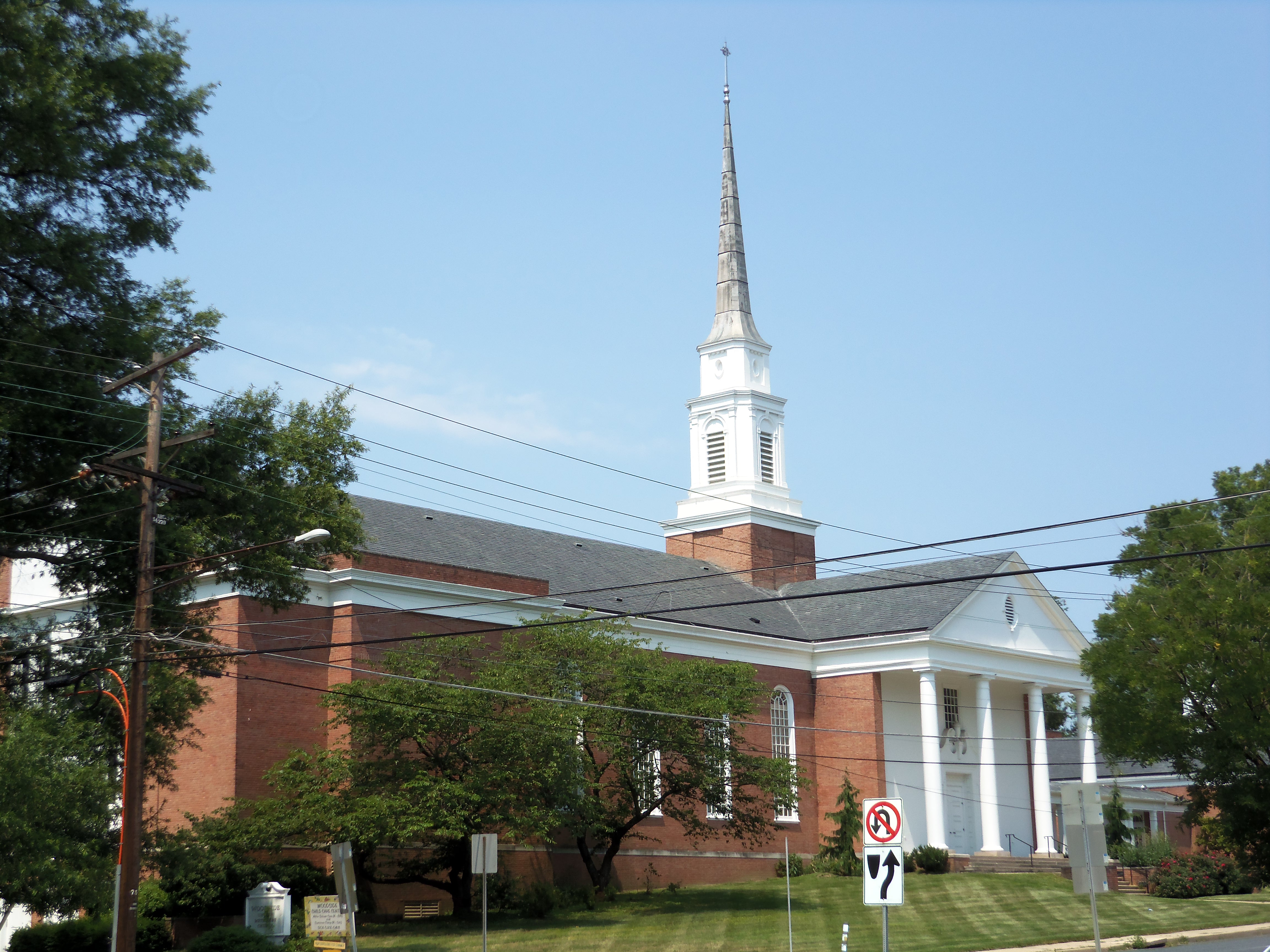
- Silver Spring United Methodist Church in Woodside

- Location of Silver Spring
- Coordinates: 39°0′6″N 77°2′14″W
- Country: United States
- State: Maryland
- County: Montgomery County
- Neighborhood: Silver Spring
- Zip Code: 20910
- Area code: Area code 301
- Website: tmgainc.com/41494

Woodside is a neighborhood in the Montgomery County, Maryland, area of Silver Spring. Founded in 1889, it is the oldest neighborhood in Silver Spring.

== Location ==
Woodside's boundaries are roughly Georgia Avenue (State Route 97) on the east, Spring Street to the South, 16th Street (State Route 390) to the north and the Red Line (Washington Metro) to the west. It borders the neighborhoods of Woodside Park and North Woodside. It also shares a boundary with the Silver Spring business district. The neighborhood was developed at the same time as other communities along the B&O Metropolitan Branch (i.e. Takoma Park, Kensington, and Garrett Park).

=== Jewish community ===
Woodside is home to an Orthodox Jewish community, centered around the Woodside Synagogue Ahavas Torah (WSAT) located on Georgia Avenue. The Woodside Synagogue is an Orthodox synagogue dating from 1974. All of the Woodside neighborhood is located within the Shepherd Park/Woodside Community Eruv, which encompasses most of incorporated Silver Spring and parts of Northwest DC.

== See also ==
- Metropolitan Branch Trail
