= Silver Spring, Maryland =

Unincorporated community in Maryland, United States

- Census-designated place
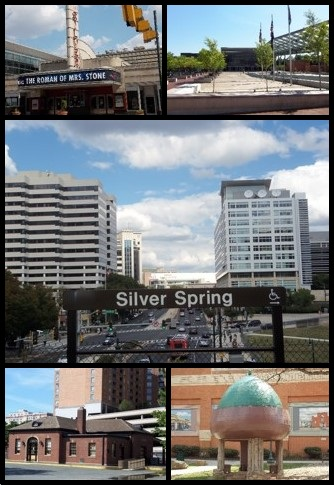
- Clockwise from top: AFI Silver, Veteran's Plaza and the civic building, Downtown Silver Spring from the Metro station, Acorn Park, Baltimore and Ohio Railroad Station

- Location of Silver Spring in Montgomery County, Maryland (left) and of Montgomery County in Maryland (right)

- Location within Maryland Location within the United States
- Coordinates: 38°59′46″N 77°01′41″W
- Country: United States
- State: Maryland
- County: Montgomery

Area
  - Total: 7.91 sq mi (20.49 km^{2})
  - Land: 7.88 sq mi (20.42 km^{2})
  - Water: 0.031 sq mi (0.08 km^{2})
- Elevation: 272 ft (83 m)

Population (2020)
  - Total: 81,015
  - Density: 10,277.1/sq mi (3,968.02/km^{2})
- Time zone: UTC−05:00 (Eastern (EST))
  - Summer (DST): UTC−04:00 (EDT)
- ZIP Codes: 20901–20907; 20910
- Area codes: 301, 240
- FIPS code: 24-72450
- GNIS feature ID: 2390301
- Highways: I-495; US 29; MD 97; MD 193; MD 390; MD 410

Silver Spring is a census-designated place (CDP) in southeastern Montgomery County, Maryland, United States, near Washington, D.C. Although officially unincorporated, it is an edge city. As of 2026, its population of about 84,593 makes it the 6th-largest populated place in Maryland.

Downtown Silver Spring, located next to the northern tip of Washington, D.C., is the oldest and most urbanized area of Silver Spring, surrounded by several inner suburban residential neighborhoods inside the Capital Beltway. Many mixed-use developments combining retail, residential, and office space have been built since 2004.

Silver Spring takes its name from a mica-flecked spring discovered there in 1840 by Francis Preston Blair, who subsequently bought much of the area's surrounding land. Acorn Park, south of downtown, is believed to be the site of the original spring.

== Geography ==
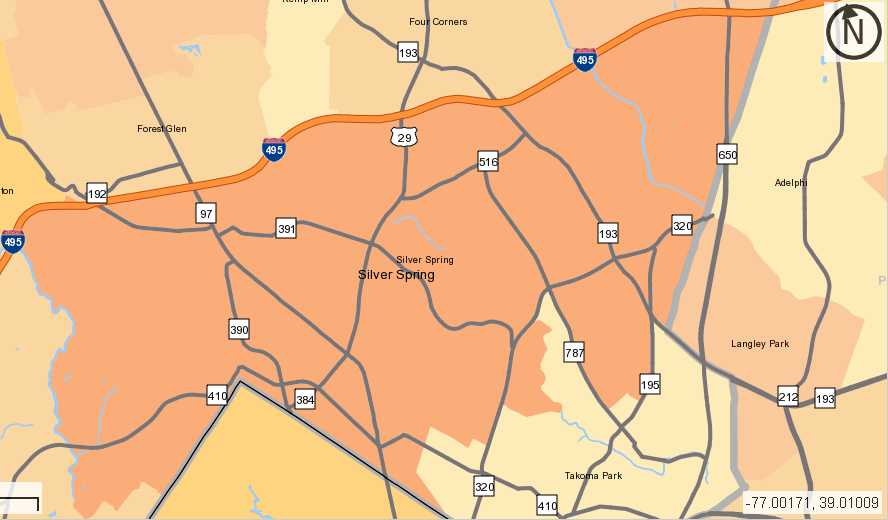
A map marking the boundaries of Silver Spring (in dark orange) as of 2010

As an unincorporated census-designated place, Silver Spring's boundaries are not consistently defined. As of the 2010 census, the U.S. Census Bureau gives Silver Spring a total area of 7.92 square miles (20.5 km^{2}), which is all land; however, the CDP contains some creeks and small ponds. This definition is a 15% reduction from the 9.4 square miles (24 km^{2}) used in previous years.

Silver Spring contains the following neighborhoods: Downtown Silver Spring, East Silver Spring, Woodside, Woodside Park, Lyttonsville, North Hills Sligo Park, Long Branch, Indian Spring, Goodacre Knolls, Franklin Knolls, Montgomery Knolls, Clifton Park Village, New Hampshire Estates, Oakview, and Woodmoor.

The U.S. Geological Survey, U.S. Postal Service, Silver Spring Urban Planning District, and Greater Silver Spring Chamber of Commerce, each use their own slightly different definitions. The Postal Service in particular assigns Silver Spring mailing addresses to a large swath of eastern Montgomery County sometimes called "Greater Silver Spring", including Four Corners, Woodmoor, Wheaton, Glenmont, Forest Glen, Forest Glen Park, Aspen Hill, Hillandale, White Oak, Colesville, Colesville Park, Cloverly, Calverton, Briggs Chaney, Greencastle, Northwood Park, Ashton, Sandy Spring, Sunset Terrace, Fairland, Lyttonsville, Kemp Mill, a portion of Langley Park, and a portion of Adelphi. The area that has a Silver Spring mailing address is larger in area than any city in Maryland except Baltimore.

Landmarks in the downtown area include the AFI Silver Theatre, the former headquarters of Discovery, Inc., a branch of The Fillmore, and the headquarters of the National Oceanic and Atmospheric Administration. Greater Silver Spring includes the National Museum of Health and Medicine, the headquarters of the Seventh-day Adventist Church, the Food and Drug Administration, and the Ahmadiyya Muslim Community in the U.S.

=== Parks and recreation ===
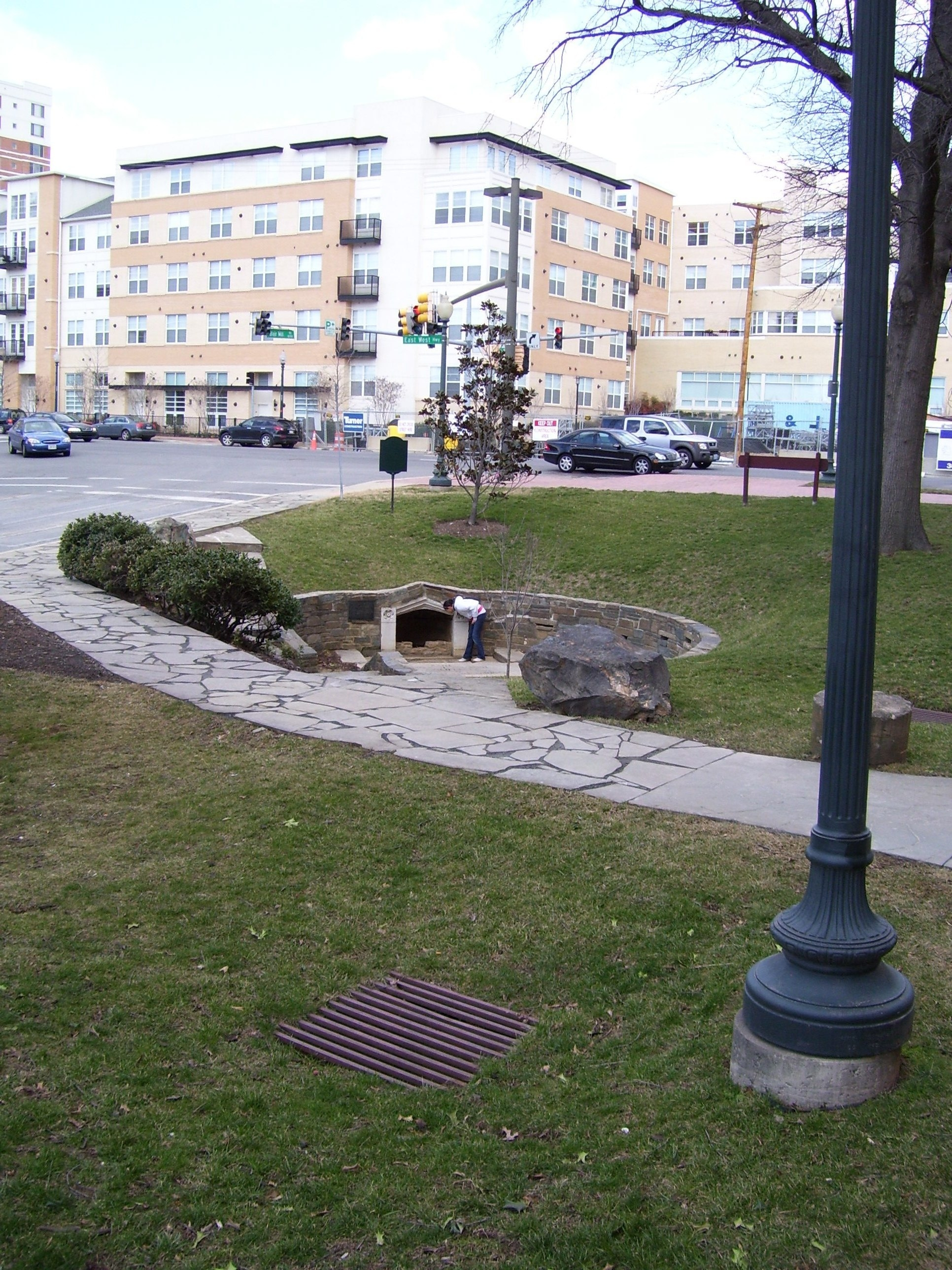
Acorn Park, believed to be the site of the "silver spring", which proved the source of the location's name

Four major creeks run through Silver Spring: from west to east, they are Rock Creek, Sligo Creek, Long Branch, and Northwest Branch. Each is surrounded by parks offering hiking trails, playgrounds, picnic areas, and tennis courts. On weekends, roads are closed in the parks for bicycling and walking.

Northwest Branch Park also includes the Rachel Carson Greenway Trail, named after Rachel Carson, the author of Silent Spring and a former resident of the area. It continues north to Wheaton Regional Park, in Wheaton, which is home to the 50-acre (20 ha) Brookside Gardens.

The 14.5-acre (5.9 ha) Jessup Blair Park, south of downtown, has a soccer field, tennis courts, basketball courts, and a picnic area. There are similar local parks throughout the residential parts of the community.

== Demographics ==
Historical population
Census	Pop.	Note	%±
1960	66,348		—
1970	77,496		16.8%
1980	72,893		−5.9%
1990	76,046		4.3%
2000	76,540		0.6%
2010	71,452		−6.6%
2020	81,015		13.4%
source: Note: land area of Silver Spring CDP reduced by 15% for 2010 census 2010–2020

=== 2023 estimates ===
In 2023, the most populous racial/ethnic groups in Silver Spring were White / Caucasian (30,244 | 37.0%), Black / African American (24,320 | 29.7%), and Hispanic or Latino (19,307 | 23.6%).

In 2023, the most populous ancestries reported in Silver Spring were Central American (12,786 | 15.6%), Subsaharan African (10,750 | 13.1%), German (6,036 | 7.4%), Ethiopian (5,947 | 7.3%), and Irish (5,835 | 7.1%), together accounting for 50.5% of all Silver Spring residents.

=== 2020 census ===
As of the 2020 census, Silver Spring had a population of 81,015. The median age was 35.2 years. 21.9% of residents were under the age of 18 and 11.7% of residents were 65 years of age or older. For every 100 females there were 91.9 males, and for every 100 females age 18 and over there were 88.4 males age 18 and over. Females made up 50.9% of the population.

100.0% of residents lived in urban areas, while 0.0% lived in rural areas.

There were 33,378 households in Silver Spring, of which 29.0% had children under the age of 18 living in them. Of all households, 36.9% were married-couple households, 21.4% were households with a male householder and no spouse or partner present, and 34.2% were households with a female householder and no spouse or partner present. About 34.9% of all households were made up of individuals and 8.8% had someone living alone who was 65 years of age or older.

There were 35,150 housing units, of which 5.0% were vacant. The homeowner vacancy rate was 0.6% and the rental vacancy rate was 5.4%.

Racial composition as of the 2020 census
Race	Number	Percent
White	28,355	35.0%
Black or African American	23,223	28.7%
American Indian and Alaska Native	965	1.2%
Asian	6,092	7.5%
Native Hawaiian and Other Pacific Islander	56	0.1%
Some other race	13,189	16.3%
Two or more races	9,135	11.3%
Hispanic or Latino (of any race)	21,794	26.9%

=== Immigration ===
As of 2019, 36.5% of Silver Spring residents (29,800 people) were born outside of the United States, which is higher than the national average of 13.9%. Of these, the most predominant foreign-born populations are from El Salvador, Ethiopia, India, and China.

=== 2010 census ===
Note: For the 2010 census, the boundaries of the Silver Spring CDP were changed, reducing the land area by approx. 15%. As a result, the population count for 2010 shows a 6.6% decrease, while the population density increased 11%.

As of the 2010 census, there were 71,452 residents, 28,603 total households, and 15,684 families residing in the Silver Spring CDP. The population density was 9,021.7 inhabitants per square mile (3,483.3/km^{2}). There were 30,522 housing units at an average density of 3,853.8 per square mile (1,488.0/km^{2}). The racial makeup of the community, as defined by the U.S. Census Bureau, for residents who self-identified as being members of "one race" was 45.7% White (7.8% German, 7.0% Irish, 5.7% English), 27.8% Black or African American (5.2% Ethiopian, 1.1% Haitian), 0.6% American Indian and Alaska Native, 7.9% Asian (2.35% Indian, 1.74% Vietnamese, 1.32% Chinese, 0.63% Korean), 0.1% Native Hawaiian and Other Pacific Islander, and 13.2% "Some Other Race" (SOR). 4.8% of the CDP's residents self-identified as being members of two or more races. Hispanic or Latino residents of any race comprised 26.3% of the population (12.3% Salvadoran, 3.71% Guatemalan, 2.83% Mexican). Like much of the Washington metropolitan area, Silver Spring is home to many people of Ethiopian ancestry.

There were 28,603 households, out of which 27.1% had children under the age of 18 living with them, 37.6% were married couples living together, 11.9% had a female householder with no husband present, and 45.2% were non-families. 33.6% of all households were made up of individuals living alone, and 16.5% had someone living alone who was 65 years of age or older. The average household size was 2.49 and the average family size was 3.21.

In the census area, 21.4% of residents were under the age of 18, 9.4% from 18 to 24, 37.1% from 25 to 44, 23.8% from 45 to 64, and 8.4% were 65 years of age or older. The median age was 33.8 years. For every 100 females, there were 94.9 males, and for every 100 females age 18 and over, there were 92.2 males.

The median income for a household in the census area was US$71,986, and the median income for a family was US$84,136.

== History ==
Before European settlement, present-day Silver Spring had been inhabited by various Indigenous peoples for about 10,000 years. Among them were the Piscataway, an Algonquian-speaking people who may have established a few villages along Sligo Creek and Rock Creek.

=== 19th century ===
In 1840, Francis Preston Blair, who later helped organize the modern Republican Party, along with his daughter, Elizabeth, discovered a spring flowing with chips of mica believed to be the now-dry spring visible at Acorn Park. Blair was looking for a site for his summer home to escape the summer heat of Washington, D.C. Two years later, Blair completed a 20-room mansion he dubbed "Silver Spring" on a 250-acre (1 km^{2}) country homestead. In 1854, Blair moved to the mansion permanently. The house stood until 1954.

By 1854, Blair's son, Montgomery Blair, who became Postmaster General under Abraham Lincoln and represented Dred Scott before the U.S. Supreme Court, built the Falkland house in the area.

By the end of the decade, Elizabeth Blair married Samuel Phillips Lee, third cousin of future Confederate leader Robert E. Lee, and gave birth to a boy, Francis Preston Blair Lee, who went on to become the first popularly elected Senator in U.S. history.

During the American Civil War, Abraham Lincoln visited the Silver Spring mansion several times, where he relaxed by playing town ball with Francis P. Blair's grandchildren.

In 1864, Confederate States Army General Jubal Early occupied Silver Spring before the Battle of Fort Stevens. After the engagement, fleeing Confederate soldiers razed Montgomery Blair's Falkland residence.

At the time, there was a community called Sligo located at the intersection of the Washington-Brookeville Turnpike and the Washington-Colesville-Ashton Turnpike, now named Georgia Avenue and Colesville Road. Sligo included a tollhouse, a store, a post office, and a few homes. The communities of Woodside, Forest Glen, and Linden were founded after the Civil War. These small towns largely lost their separate identities when a post office was established in Silver Spring in 1899. Gist Blair was Silver Spring's first postmaster.

By the end of the 19th century, the region began to develop into a town of size and importance. The Baltimore and Ohio Railroad's Metropolitan Branch opened on April 30, 1873, and ran through Silver Spring from Washington, D.C., to Point of Rocks, Maryland.

The first suburban development appeared in 1887 when Selina Wilson divided part of her farm on present-day Colesville Road (U.S. Route 29) and Brookeville Road into five- and ten-acre (20000 - and 40000 m^{2}) plots. In 1892, Francis Preston Blair Lee and his wife, Anne Brooke Lee, gave birth to E. Brooke Lee, who is known as the father of modern Silver Spring for his visionary attitude toward developing the region.

=== 20th century ===
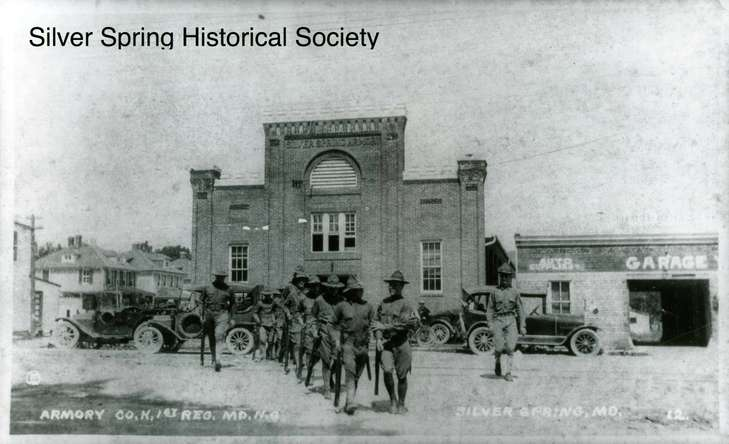
The Silver Spring Armory, constructed in 1917 by E. Brooke Lee

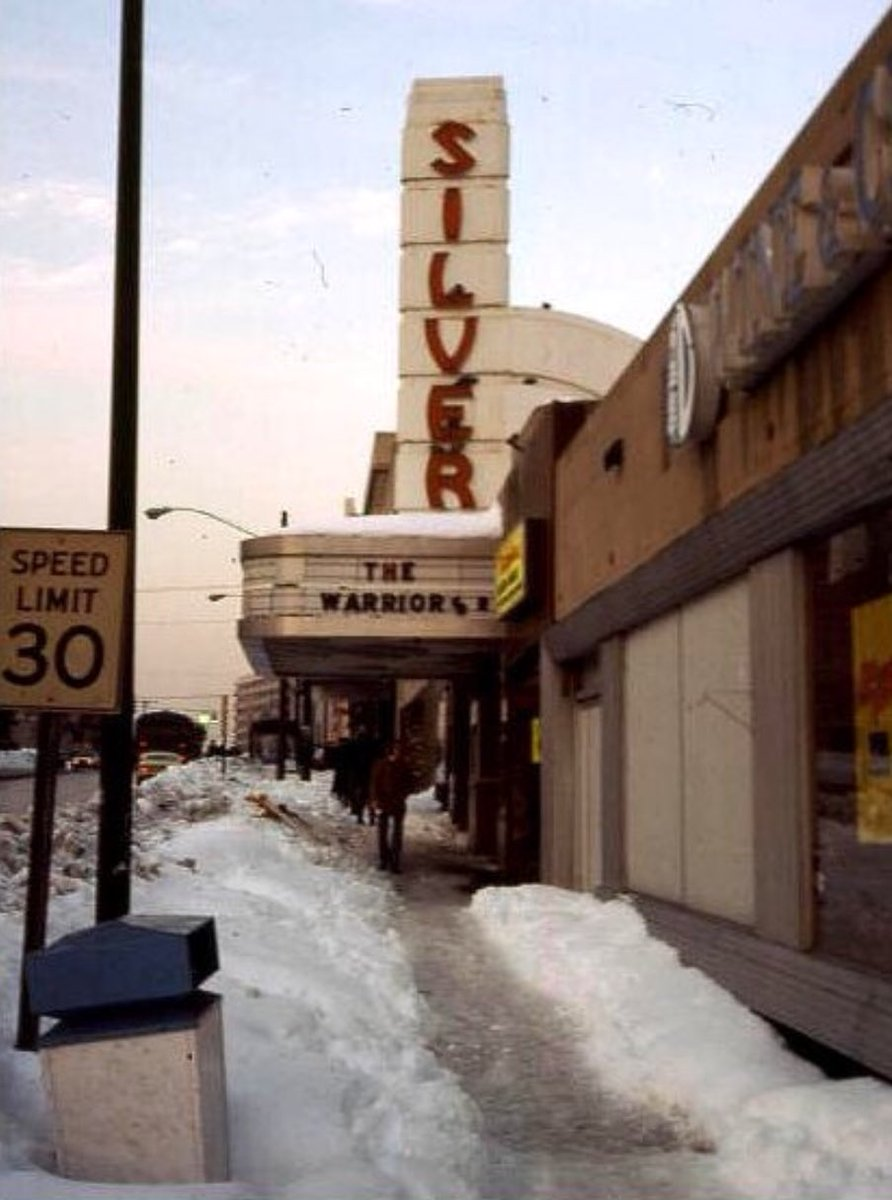
Silver Spring in 1979

In the early 20th century, E. Brooke Lee and his brother, Blair Lee I, founded the Lee Development Company, whose Colesville Road office building remains a downtown fixture. Dale Drive, a winding roadway, was built to provide vehicular access to much of the family's substantial real estate holdings. Suburban development continued in 1922 when Woodside Development Corporation created Woodside Park, a neighborhood of 1-acre (4,000 m^{2}) plot home sites built on the former Noyes estate in 1923.

In 1924, Washington trolley service on Georgia Avenue (present-day Maryland Route 97) across B&O's Metropolitan Branch was suspended so that an underpass could be built. The underpass was completed two years later, but trolley service never resumed. It would be rebuilt again in 1948 with additional lanes for automobile traffic, opening the areas to the north for readily accessible suburban development.

Takoma-Silver Spring High School, built in 1924, was the first high school for Silver Spring. The community's rapid growth led to the need for a larger school. In 1935, when a new high school building was erected at Wayne Avenue and Sligo Creek Parkway, the school was renamed Montgomery Blair High School. In 1998, the school was moved again, to a new, larger facility at the corner of Colesville Road (U.S. Route 29) and University Boulevard (Maryland Route 193). The former Blair building became a combined middle school and elementary school, housing Silver Spring International Middle School and Sligo Creek Elementary School.

The Silver Spring Shopping Center, built by developer Albert Small and Silver Theatre, designed by theater architect John Eberson, were completed in 1938 at the request of developer William Alexander Julian. The Silver Spring Shopping Center was one of the nation's first retail spaces with a street-front parking lot, defying conventional wisdom that merchandise should be in windows closest to the street so that people could see it. The shopping center was purchased in 1944 by real estate developer Sam Eig, who helped attract large retailers to the city.

Before the 1950s, Silver Spring was known as a sundown town, in part because of influential land owners. The North Washington Real Estate Company designed 63 acres (25 ha) to be white-only, written in its deeds to prevent the sale of land to anyone else. The Fair Housing Act outlawed this practice in 1968, almost two decades after Shelley v. Kramer made racial covenants unenforceable. A 1939 deed for a property owned by Rozier J. Beech in the Sixteenth Street Village subdivision of Silver Spring said, "No negro, or any person or persons of whose blood or extraction or to any person of the semitic race whose blood or origin of racial description will be deemed to include Armenians, Jews, Hebrews, Persians, Syrians, Greeks and Turks, shall use or occupy any building or any lot, except that this covenant shall not prevent occupancy by domestic servants of a different race domiciled with an owner or tenant." In practice, covenants excluding "Semitic races" were primarily used to discriminate against Jews, as Montgomery County did not have significant Armenian, Greek, Iranian, or Turkish populations at the time.

In all, housing in more than 10 square miles (26 km^{2}) of greater Silver Spring was blocked off to Blacks, Jews, Armenians, Persians, Turks, and Greeks, who were considered non-white at the time.

By the 1950s, Silver Spring was the second-busiest retail market between Baltimore and Richmond; major retailers included the Hecht Company, J.C. Penney, and Sears, Roebuck and Company. In 1954, the 1842 Blair mansion "Silver Spring" was razed and replaced with the Blair Station post office. 1960 saw the opening of Wheaton Plaza, later called Westfield Wheaton, a shopping center several miles north of downtown Silver Spring. It captured much of the town's business, and the downtown area began a long period of decline.

On December 19, 1961, a two-mile (3.2 km) segment of the Capital Beltway (I-495) was opened to traffic between Georgia Avenue (MD 97) and University Boulevard East (MD 193).

On August 17, 1964, the final segment of the 64-mile (103 km) Beltway was opened to traffic, and a ribbon-cutting ceremony was held near the New Hampshire Avenue interchange, with a speech by Gov. J. Millard Tawes, who called it a "road of opportunity" for Maryland and the nation.

Washington Metro rail service into Washington, D.C., helped breathe new life into the region starting with the 1978 opening of Silver Spring station. The Metro Red Line followed the right-of-way of the B&O Metropolitan Branch, with the Metro tracks centered between the B&O's eastbound and westbound mains. The Red Line heads south to downtown DC from Silver Spring, running at grade before descending into Union Station. By the mid-1990s, the Red Line continued north from the downtown Silver Spring core, entering a tunnel just past the Silver Spring station and running underground to three more stations: Forest Glen, Wheaton, and Glenmont.

Silver Spring's downtown continued to decline in the 1980s. The Hecht Company closed its downtown location in 1987 and moved to Wheaton Plaza while forbidding another department store to rent its old spot. City Place, a multi-level mall, was established in the old Hecht Company building in 1992, but it had difficulty attracting quality anchor stores and gained a reputation as a budget mall. In the mid-1990s, developers considered building a mega-mall and entertainment complex called the American Dream, similar to the Mall of America, in downtown Silver Spring, but were unable to secure funding. A bright spot for the city in the late 1980s and early 1990s was the National Oceanographic and Atmospheric Administration (NOAA) consolidating its headquarters to four new high-rise office buildings near the Silver Spring Metro station.

A February 16, 1996, train collision on the Silver Spring section of the Metropolitan line left 11 people dead. A MARC commuter train bound for Washington Union Station during the Friday evening rush hour collided with the Amtrak Capitol Limited train and erupted in flames on a snow-swept stretch of track.

The Maryland State Highway Administration started studies of improvements to the Capital Beltway in 1993, and have continued, off and on, examining a number of alternatives since then, including HOV lanes and high-occupancy toll lanes.

=== 21st century ===
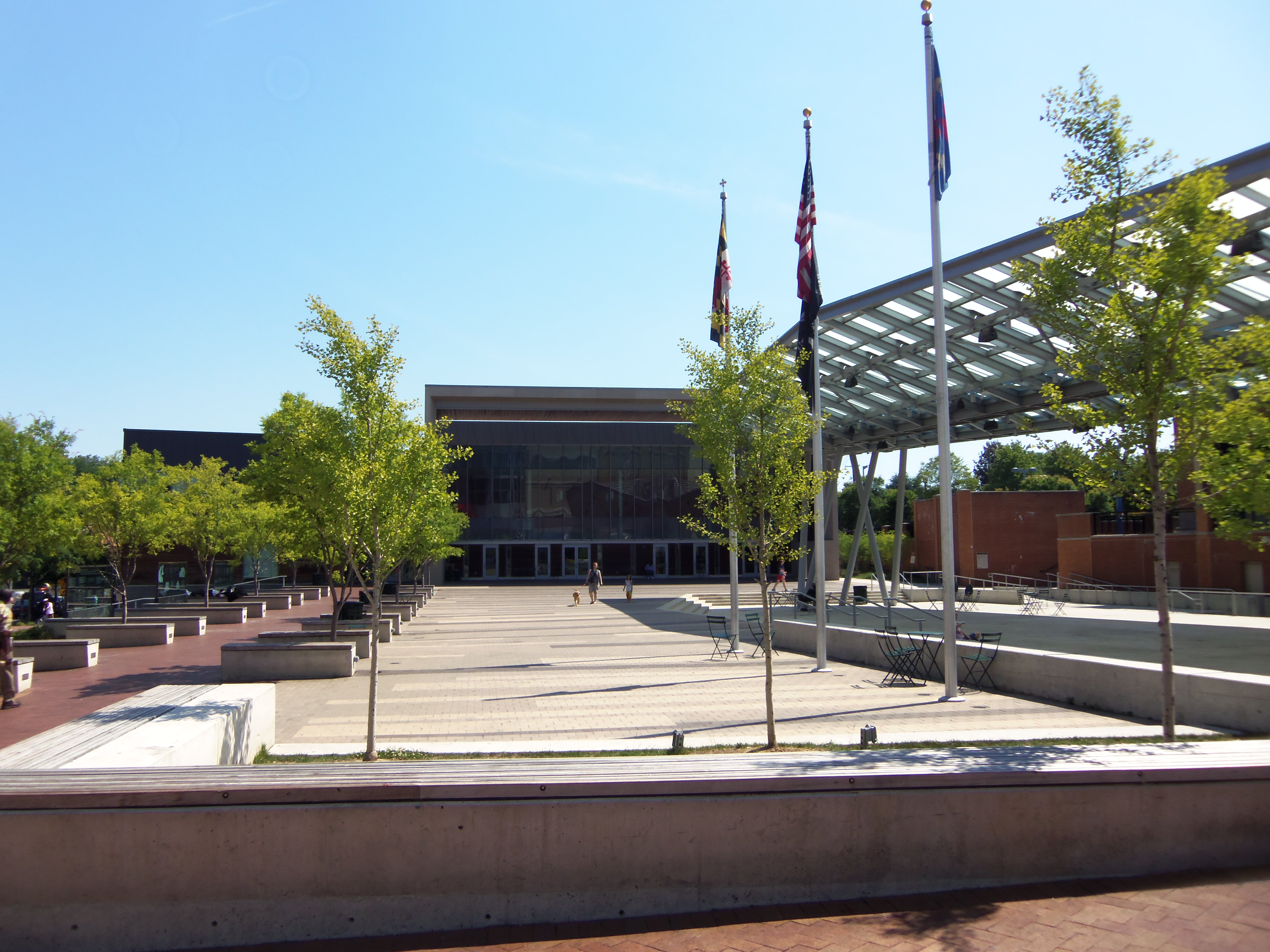
Silver Spring Civic Building and Veterans Plaza in June 2012

At the beginning of the 21st century, downtown Silver Spring began to see the results of redevelopment. Several city blocks near City Place Mall were rebuilt to accommodate a new outdoor shopping plaza called Downtown Silver Spring. As downtown Silver Spring revived, its 160-year history was celebrated in a 2002 PBS documentary entitled Silver Spring: Story of an American Suburb.

In 2003, Discovery, Inc. moved its headquarters from nearby Bethesda to a new building in downtown Silver Spring. In 2017, Discovery, Inc. CEO David Zaslav announced that the company was relocating to New York City to operate close to their "ad partners on Madison Avenue", "investors and analysts on Wall Street", and their "creative and production community". 2003 also brought the reopening of the Silver Theatre, as AFI Silver, under the auspices of the American Film Institute.

Beginning in 2004, the downtown redevelopment was marketed locally with the "silver sprung" advertising campaign, which declared on buses and in print ads that Silver Spring had "sprung" and was ready for business. In June 2007, The New York Times noted that downtown was "enjoying a renaissance, a result of public involvement and private investment that is turning it into an arts and entertainment center".

In 2005, downtown Silver Spring was awarded the silver medal of the Rudy Bruner Award for Urban Excellence

In 2007, the downtown Silver Spring area gained attention when an amateur photographer was prohibited from taking photographs in what appeared to be a public street. The land, leased to the Peterson Companies, a developer, for $1, was technically private property. The citizens argued that the Downtown Silver Spring development, partially built with public money, was still public property. After a protest on July 4, 2007, Peterson relented and allowed photography on their property under limited conditions. Peterson also claimed that it could revoke these rights at any time. The company further stated that other activities permitted in public spaces, such as organizing protests or distributing campaign literature, were still prohibited. In response, Montgomery County Attorney Leon Rodriguez said that the street in question, Ellsworth Drive, "constitutes a public forum" and that the First Amendment's protection of free speech applies there. In an eight-page letter, Rodriguez wrote, "Although the courts have not definitively resolved the issue of whether the taking, as opposed to the display, of photographs is a protected expressive act, we think it is likely that a court would consider the taking of the photograph to be part of the continuum of action that leads to the display of the photograph and thus also protected by the First Amendment." The incident was part of a trend in the United States regarding the blurring of public and private spaces in developments built with both public and private funds.

In 2008, construction began on the long-planned Intercounty Connector (ICC), which crosses the upper reaches of Silver Spring. The highway's first section opened on February 21, 2011; the entire route was completed by 2012. In July 2010, the Silver Spring Civic Building and Veterans Plaza opened in downtown Silver Spring.

Between 2015 and 2016, the long-struggling City Place Mall was renovated and reopened as Ellsworth Place The old B&O Passenger Station was restored between 2000 and 2002, as recorded in the documentary film Next Stop: Silver Spring.

In May 2019, Peterson announced a $10 million renovation of the Downtown Silver Spring development that will include public art and a new outdoor plaza, featuring green space.

== Culture ==
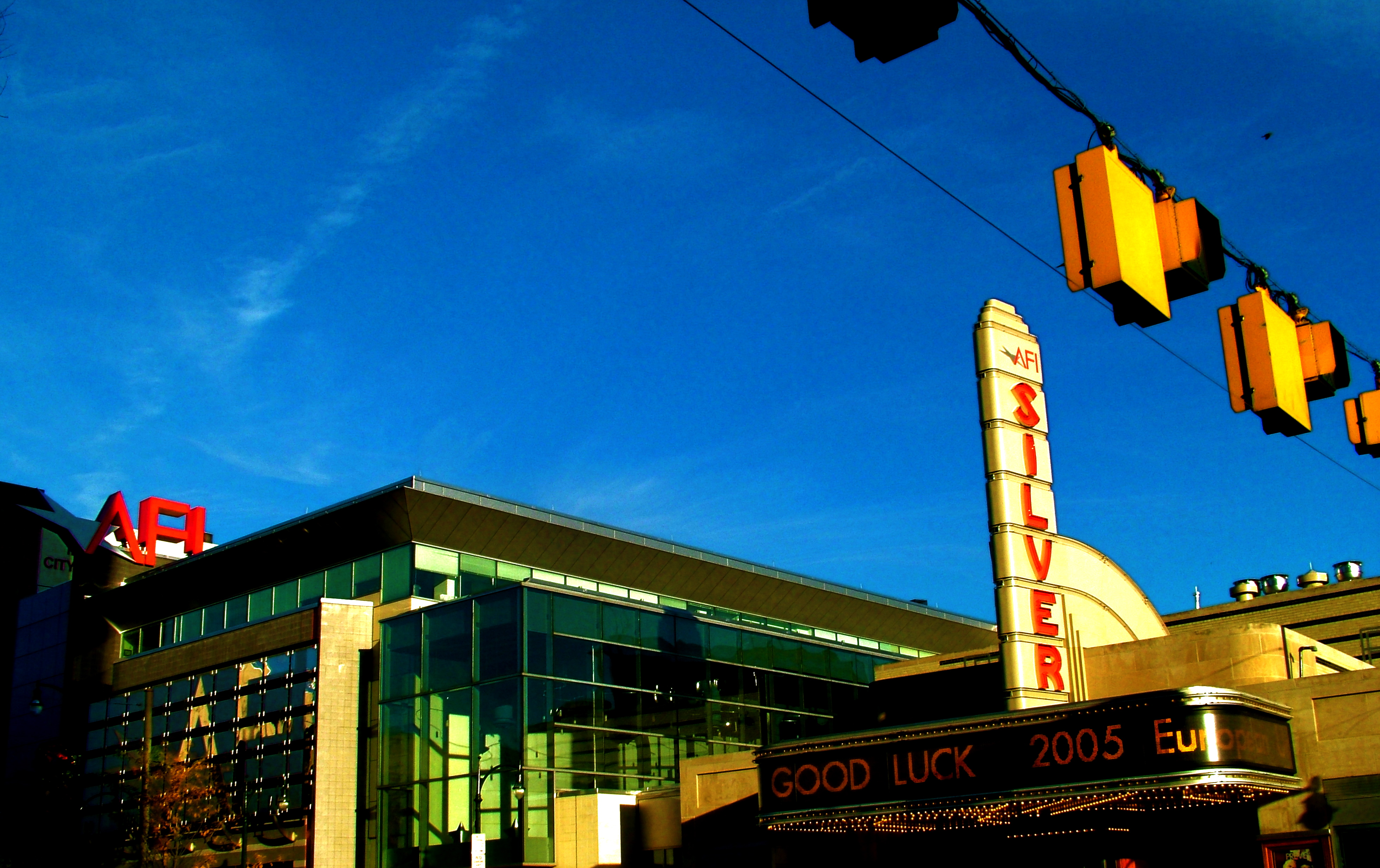
AFI Silver in November 2005

Downtown Silver Spring hosts numerous entertainment, musical, and ethnic festivals, and the annual Montgomery County Thanksgiving Parade (Saturday before Thanksgiving). The Silver Spring Jazz Festival is the largest annual event, drawing 20000 people to the free festival held on the second Saturday in September. Featuring local jazz artists and a battle of high school bands, the Silver Spring Jazz Festival has featured Wynton Marsalis, Arturo Sandoval, Sérgio Mendes, Aaron Neville, the Mingus Big Band, the Fred Wesley Group, and other jazz music artists.

The Fillmore is a live entertainment and music venue with a capacity of 2000 people. It opened in 2011 in the former JCPenney building on Colesville Road. The venue joins the American Film Institute and the former Discovery Communications building as cornerstones of the downtown Silver Spring's arts and entertainment district, and has featured performances by artists Prince Royce, Minus the Bear, Tyga, Wale, Schoolboy Q, Migos, and others. In August 2012 R&B singer Reesa Renee launched her album Reelease at the Fillmore.

Downtown Silver Spring is home to the Cultural Arts Center at Montgomery College. The Cultural Arts Center offers a varied set of cultural performances, lectures, films, and conferences. It is a resource for improving cultural literacy, encouraging cross-cultural understanding, and to build bridges between the arts, cultural studies, and other disciplines concerned with the expression of culture.

Dining in Silver Spring is varied, including American, African, Burmese, Ethiopian, Guatemalan, Japanese, Moroccan, Italian, Mexican, Salvadoran, Jamaican, Vietnamese, Lebanese, Thai, Persian, Chinese, Indian, Greek, and fusion restaurants, and national and regional chains. The downtown area is particularly noted for its very high concentration of Ethiopian cuisine.

Silver Spring has several churches, synagogues, temples, and other religious institutions, including the World Headquarters of the Seventh-day Adventist Church. Silver Spring serves as the primary urban area in Montgomery County and its revitalization has ushered in an eclectic mix of people and ideas, evident in the fact that the flagship high school, Montgomery Blair High School, has no majority group with each major racial and ethnic group claiming a significant percentage.

Silver Spring hosts the American Film Institute Silver Theatre and Culture Center, on Colesville Road. The theatre showcases American and foreign films. Gandhi Brigade, a youth development media project, began in Silver Spring out of the Long Branch neighborhood. Docs in Progress, a non-profit media arts center devoted to the promotion of documentary filmmaking is located at the "Documentary House" in downtown Silver Spring. Silver Spring Stage, an all-volunteer community theater, performs in Woodmoor, approximately 3 miles (4.8 km) north up Colesville Road from the downtown area. Downtown Silver Spring is also home to the National Oceanic and Atmospheric Administration (NOAA), an agency of the United States Department of Commerce that includes the National Weather Service, the American Nurses Association, and several real estate development, biotechnology, and media and communications companies.

Stevie Nicks of the band Fleetwood Mac has credited Silver Spring as an inspiration for the title of the band's 1977 song "Silver Springs". In a 1998 interview, Nicks said, "I wrote Silver Springs, about Lindsey [Buckingham]. And I—we were in Maryland somewhere driving under a freeway sign that said Silver Spring, Maryland. And I loved the name....Silver Springs sounded like a pretty fabulous place to me. And uh, 'You could be my silver springs...' that's just a whole symbolic thing of what you could have been to me."

== Transportation ==
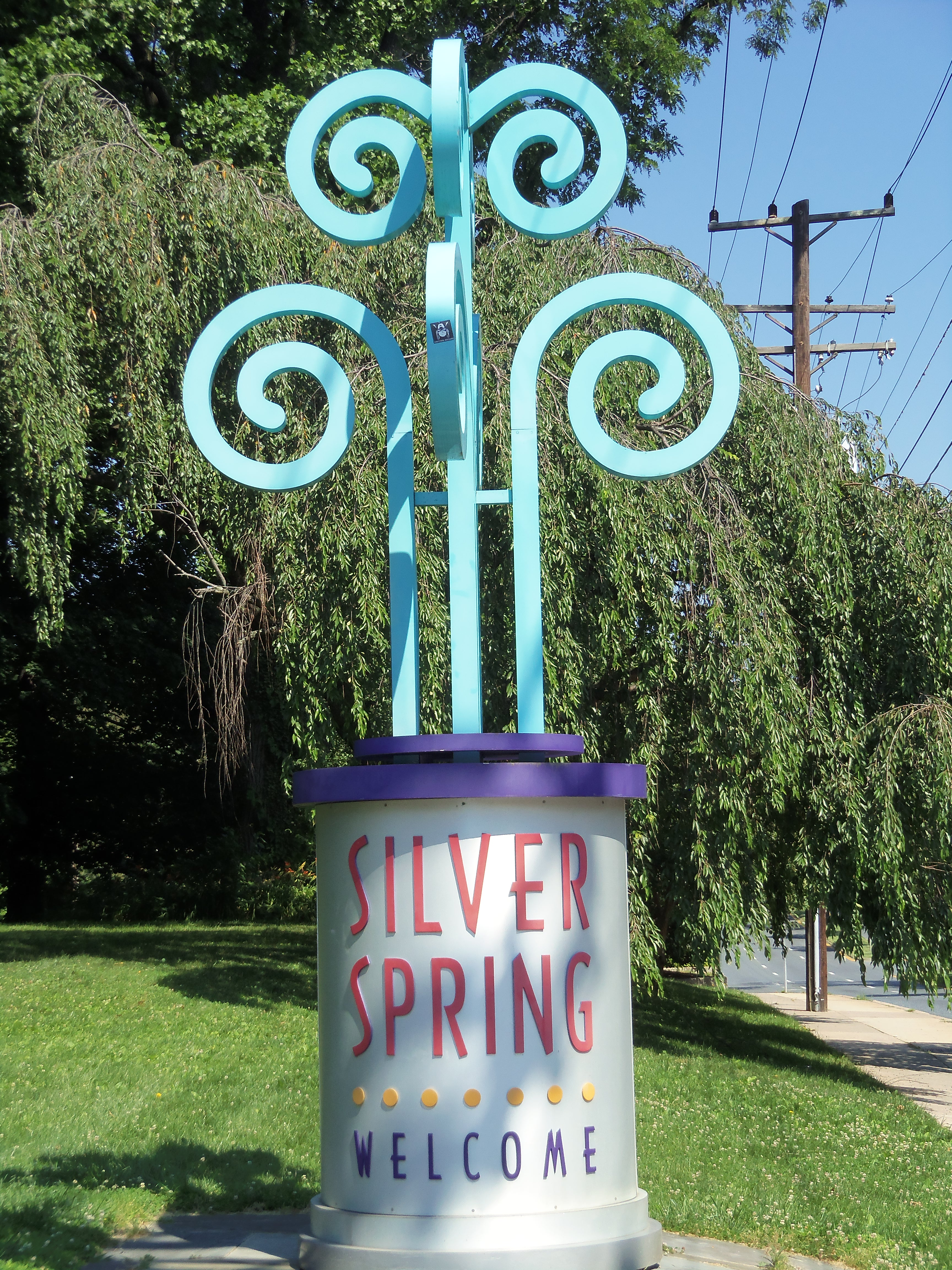
A Silver Spring welcome sign on Georgia Avenue in June 2012

The major roads in Silver Spring are mostly three- to five-lane highways. The Capital Beltway can be accessed from Georgia Avenue (MD 97), Colesville Road (US 29), and New Hampshire Avenue (MD 650).

The long-planned Intercounty Connector (ICC) (MD-200) toll road opened in three segments between February 2011 and November 2014. ICC interchanges in the Silver Spring area include Georgia Avenue, Layhill Road (MD-182), New Hampshire Avenue, Columbia Pike (US-29) and Briggs Chaney Road.

The multilevel Paul Sarbanes Transit Center in downtown Silver Spring, named in honor of former U.S. Senator Paul Sarbanes from Maryland, is served by the MARC Train on the Brunswick Line, Washington Metro on the Red Line at Silver Spring station, Metrobus, Ride On, the free VanGo, intercity Greyhound bus, and local taxi services. The bus terminal is the busiest in the Washington metropolitan area. This transit facility serves nearly 60000 passengers daily. The transit center is an expanded version of an older bus, train, and Metro terminal. Begun in October 2008, the expansion, planned to consume $91 million and four years, opened four years late and $50 million over budget on September 20, 2015.

The transit center will also be served by the Purple Line light rail. Under construction by the Maryland Transit Administration (MTA), the line is expected to open in late 2027, and will connect Silver Spring with Bethesda to the west, the University of Maryland, College Park to the east, and the Washington Metro's New Carrollton station to the southeast.

== Education ==
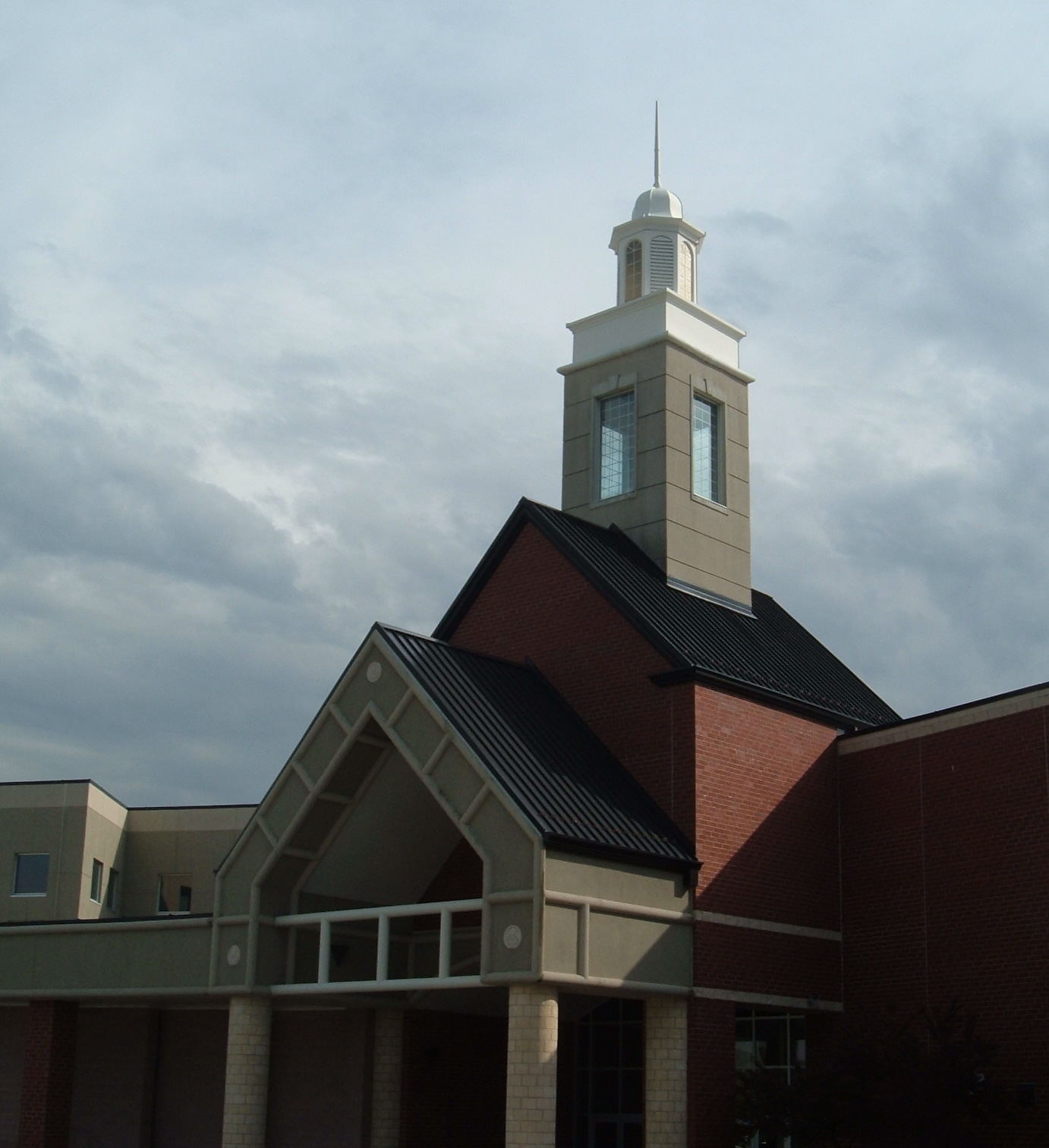
The cupola at Montgomery Blair High School in April 2006

=== Montgomery County Public Schools ===
Silver Spring is served by Montgomery County Public Schools, a county-wide public school district.

==== High schools ====
- James Hubert Blake High School
- John F. Kennedy High School
- Montgomery Blair High School
- Northwood High School
- Springbrook High School
- Wheaton High School

==== Middle schools ====
- Benjamin Banneker Middle School
- Silver Spring International Middle School
- Takoma Park Middle School
- Eastern Middle School
- White Oak Middle School
- Briggs Chaney Middle School
- Argyle Middle School
- Odessa Shannon Middle School
- Sligo Middle School
- Francis Scott Key Middle School
- A. Mario Loiderman Middle School
- Thornton Friends Middle School
- Silver Creek Middle School
- Newport Mill Middle School

Prior to 2010, Montgomery Blair High School was the only high school in Silver Spring. It is nationally recognized for its Communication Arts Program and its Science, Mathematics, and Computer Science Magnet Program, the latter of which often produces a large number of finalists and semi-finalists in such academic competitions as the Regeneron Science Talent Search.

=== Private schools ===
Notable private schools in Silver Spring include The Siena School, Yeshiva of Greater Washington, Yeshiva College of the Nation's Capital, the Torah School of Greater Washington, and The Barrie School.

Saint Francis International School St. Camillus Campus, serving kindergarten through 8th grade, is in Silver Spring. It was formerly St. Camillus School, which was operated by sisters of Notre Dame de Namur University and opened in 1954. In the mid-1960s, it had up to 1,200 students. Working-class people were the main clientele. The student population was in decline by the 1980s as working-class people moved from the area. By the same decade the teachers were mostly lay staff. In the decade of the 2000s the school's financial situation deteriorated. In 2010 the school had 260 students. It merged into Saint Francis International, which opened in 2010; at that time all teachers had to reapply for their jobs. In 2010 Saint Francis International had 435 students at all campuses. In 2014 it had 485 students at all campuses; over 70% the students were of parents born abroad.

=== Montgomery College ===
Montgomery College's Takoma Park/Silver Spring campus is located on both sides of the border between Silver Spring and Takoma Park. The community college is Montgomery County's main institute of higher education; the main campus is in the county seat of Rockville.

=== Howard University ===
Howard University's School of Continuing Education is located in Silver Spring; its main campus is in nearby Washington, D.C.

=== Libraries ===
Silver Spring is served by Brigadier General Charles E. McGee Library in downtown Silver Spring, Wheaton Library, White Oak Library, and Long Branch Library.

The McGee Library started operation as the Silver Spring Library in 1931 and is one of the most heavily used in the Montgomery County System. In June 2015, it was relocated to a new building at Wayne Avenue and Fenton Street as part of the Downtown Silver Spring redevelopment plan. The library was designed to accommodate tracks and an eventual Silver Spring Library station for the Purple Line (Maryland) light rail.

== Economy ==
A number of major companies and organizations are based in Silver Spring, including:

- American Nurses Association, a professional organization
- Curiosity Stream, a streaming media company
- Food and Drug Administration, a U.S. federal government agency
- Global Communities, an international development and humanitarian aid nonprofit
- National Oceanic and Atmospheric Administration, a U.S. federal government agency
- Urban One, a media company
- United Therapeutics, a biotechnology company

== Sports ==
The Silver Spring Saints Youth Football Organization has been a mainstay of youth sports in the town since 1951. Located in Silver Spring, the Silver Spring Saints play home games at St. Bernadette's Church near Blair High School. The club was formed when two local Catholic parishes, St. John the Baptist and St. Andrews, merged their football programs to compete in the Capital Beltway League after the CYO (Catholic Youth Organization) for the Archdiocese of Washington D.C. discontinued its youth football program at the end of the 1994 season. The name "Saints" is derived from the merging of the two Catholic parishes. In 2009, the Saints moved from the Capital Beltway League (CBL) to the Mid-Maryland Youth Football & Cheer League (MMYFCL).

Silver Spring is also home to several swim teams, including Parkland, Robin Hood, Calverton, Franklin Knolls, Daleview, Oakview, Forest Knolls, Kemp Mill, Long Branch, Stonegate, Glenwood, Rock Creek, and Northwest Branch, Hillandale, and West Hillandale.

Silver Spring and Takoma Park together host Silver Spring-Takoma Thunderbolts a college wooden-bat baseball team playing in the Cal Ripken Sr. Collegiate Baseball League. Home games are played at Montgomery Blair Stadium.

The Potomac Athletic Club Rugby team has a youth rugby organization based in Silver Spring. Established in 2005, PAC Youth Rugby has tag rugby for ages 5 to 15, girls and boys and also offer introduction to tackle rugby for U13 and U15 players. In addition to introducing numerous young athletes to the sport of rugby, PAC has also won Maryland state championships across the age groups.

== Media ==
Silver Spring is served by Washington metropolitan area media, including two daily newspapers, The Washington Post and The Washington Times, and several online outlets. The Gazette and the Montgomery County Sentinel were available historically until their closures in 2015 and 2020, respectively.

The Washington Hispanic has its offices in Silver Spring.

Companies headquartered in Silver Spring include Urban One. After relocating to New York City in 2018, Discovery Inc. sold its former Silver Spring headquarters to Foulger-Pratt and Cerberus Capital Management, and leased a smaller space at nearby 8403 Colesville Road.

== See also ==
- List of sundown towns in the United States
- Montgomery College
- Montgomery County Public Libraries
- Montgomery County Public Schools
- Montgomery County, Maryland
- Silver Spring Library
- Silver Spring Monkeys
- Washington metropolitan area
