= Anacostia Tributary Trail System =

Hiking trail in Maryland

Coordinates: 38°57′41.2″N 76°55′31″W

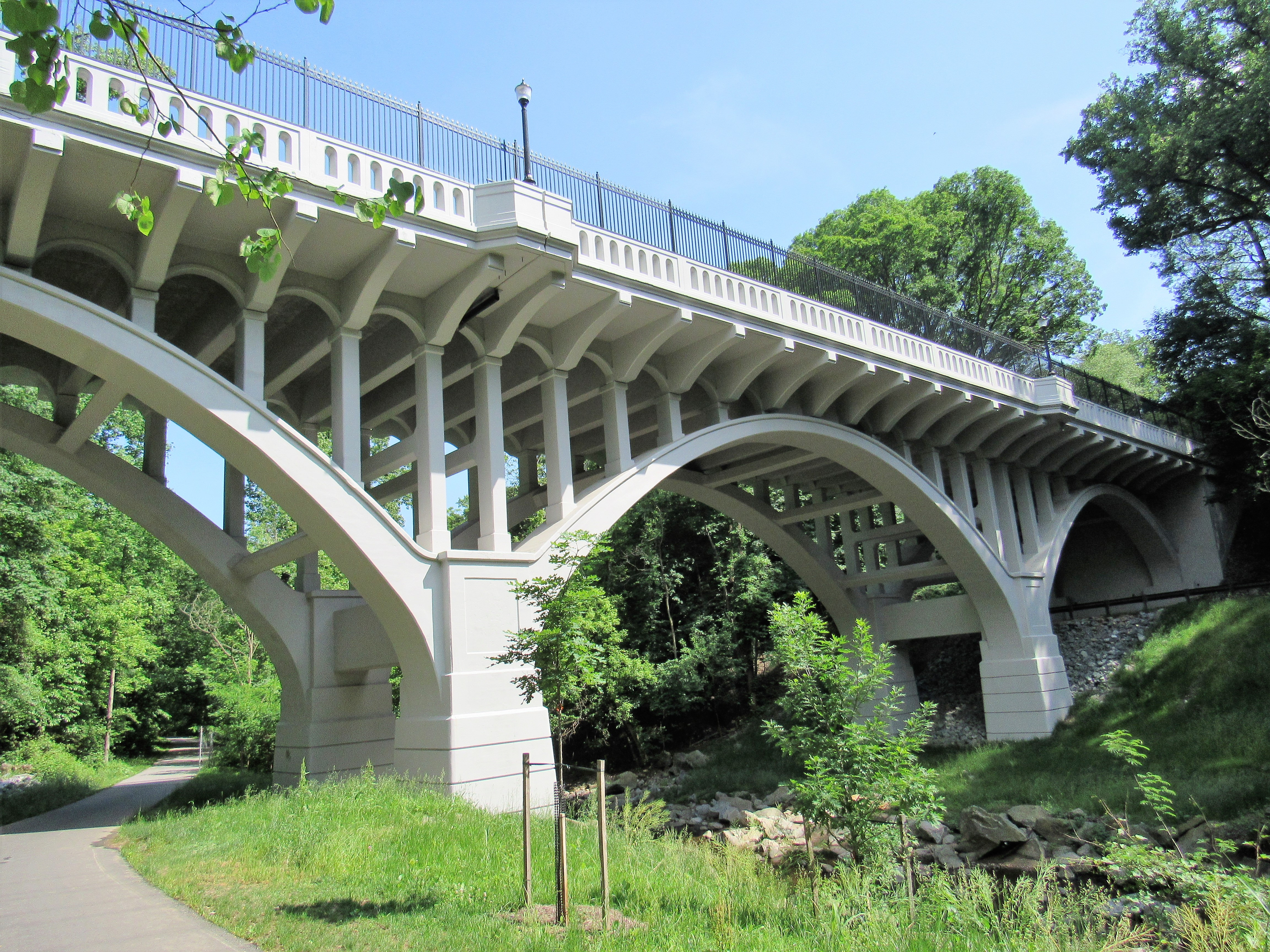
- Sligo Creek at the Carroll Avenue Bridge in Takoma Park, Maryland
- Location: Prince George's County, Maryland, Montgomery County, Maryland
- Season: Year-round
- Months: Year-round
- Website: www.anacostia.net/maps/trail_map.html

The Anacostia Tributary Trail System (ATTS) is a unified and signed system of stream valley trails joining trails along the Anacostia tributaries of Northwest Branch, Northeast Branch, Indian Creek and Paint Branch with a trail along the Anacostia River, set aside and maintained by the Maryland-National Capital Park and Planning Commission (M-NCPPC) in the Maryland suburbs of Washington, D.C.

ATTS is a part of the East Coast Greenway, a 3,000-mile-long system of trails connecting Maine to Florida and the American Discovery Trail, a trail system stretching from the Delaware coast to San Francisco. It is located within the Anacostia Trail Heritage Area.

== Description ==
The system includes several hiker-biker trails, primarily: the Northeast Branch Trail, the Northwest Branch Trail, and the Paint Branch Trail; all of which are in Prince George's County. The trail system also includes the Sligo Creek Trail, which extends 8.85 miles (14.24 km) and crosses Prince George's County and Montgomery County. The majority of the routes consist of protected stream valley parks established by M-NCPPC in the 1930s.

The trail system converges on a zero milepost in Hyattsville in an area known as Port Towns, named after the former deepwater port of Bladensburg at the head of the Anacostia River, where the various tributaries converge. A trail along the Anacostia connects the system to Washington, DC, near the New York Avenue Bridge where it continues as the Anacostia River Trail. And a trail connector from the West Hyattsville Metro Station will eventually connect it with DC's Metropolitan Branch Trail at Fort Totten. The trail system also constitutes part of the Rhode Island Avenue Trolley Trail, with which it connects.

The area covered by the trails corresponds with the coastal plain section of the Anacostia watershed, which consists of wide floodplains that were reserved for parkland and flood-control by the Army Corps of Engineers, using a system of levees and concrete embankments upon which the trails were initially built. In conjunction with the restoration of natural habitat along the adjoining stream valleys in the 1990s, M-NCPPC and Prince George's County Department of Parks and Recreation connected and upgraded the stream valley trails into a consistent network of approximately 24 miles (39 km) of paved 6–10-foot-wide (1.8–3.0 m) off-road paths.

A trail system along the Anacostia and its tributaries was first envisioned in the Interior Department's 1967 "Trails For America" report. In 1973, The Maryland National Capital Park and Planning Commission (M-NCPP) formed a Trails Citizen's Advisory Council created a more formal plan for trails and identified ones including those along the tributaries, that were ready for construction. Construction started in the mid-1970's, usually as a side-project for drainage and sewage projects and by 1977 there were trails along Paint Branch, the Northeast Branch and the Northwest Branch with more construction underway. Montgomery County's 1978 Bikeways Master Plan included trails along the Northwest Branch, Paint Branch and Sligo Creek.

== Northwest Branch Trail ==
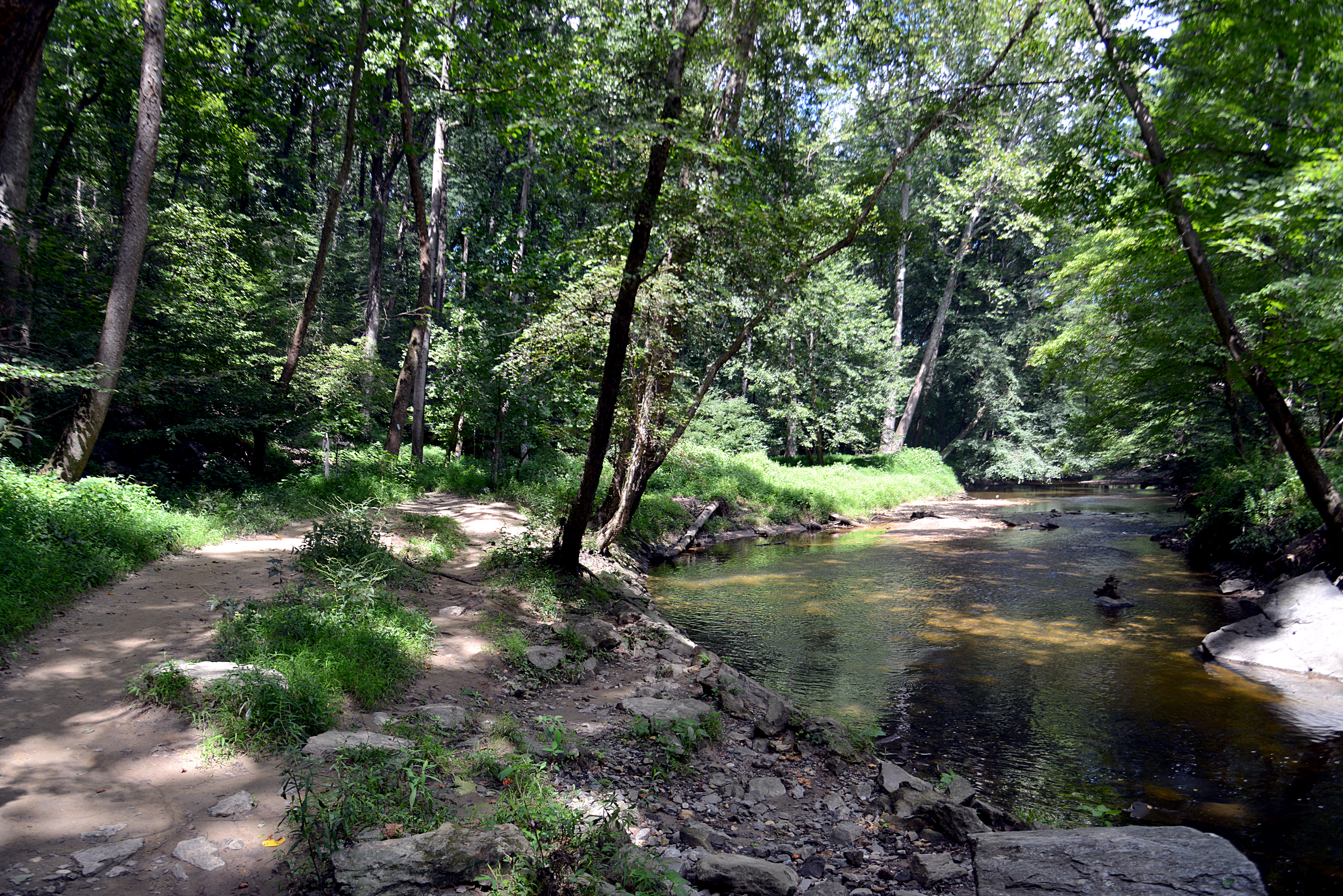
Northwest Branch Trail in Silver Spring, MD

7 miles (11 km) of trail located between Hyattsville and Adelphi near New Hampshire Avenue and the Capital Beltway. The paved trail terminates at the southern terminus of the Rachel Carson Environmental Area just south of the Beltway near Adelphi Mill. The Rachel Carson Greenway extends the Northwest Branch Trail into northern Montgomery County as an unimproved hiking trail, connecting to Wheaton Regional Park. The first 3/4 mile of trail, between Riggs Road and the Montgomery County line, was completed by May 1977 and another 5 1/4 miles were still under construction.

=== Sligo Creek Trail ===
8.85 miles (14.24 km) of trail located predominantly in Montgomery County, ending in Wheaton in the vicinity of Wheaton Regional Park. The Sligo Creek trail originates at the Northwest Branch Trail at Chillum Community Park, Hyattsville, approximately 2.2 miles west of the zero milepost.

=== Metropolitan Branch trail connector ===
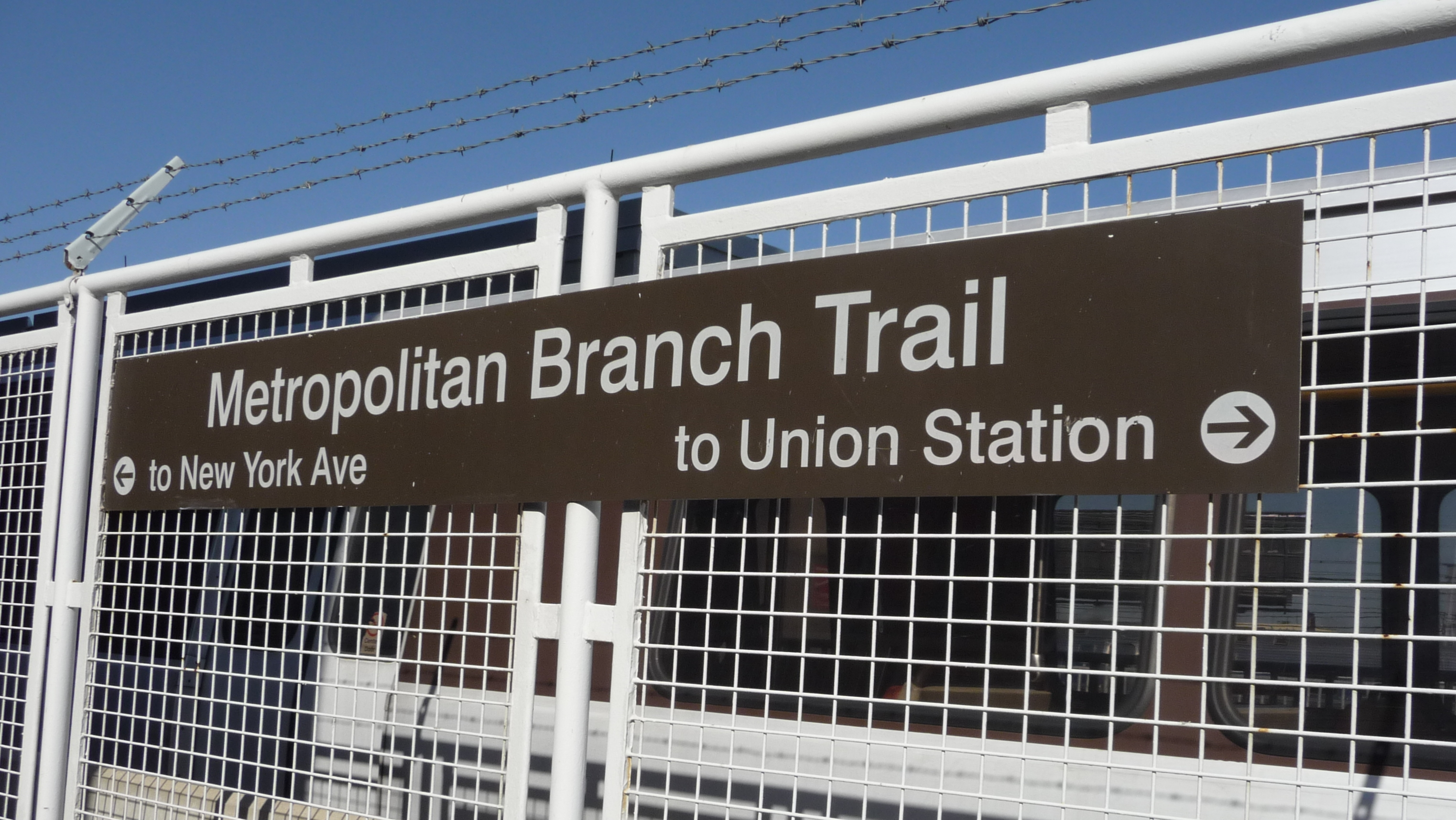
Metropolitan Branch Trail

A connecting trail has been proposed to connect the Anacostia Tributary Trails system to the Metropolitan Branch rail-trail in Washington, to connect several long-distance hiker-biker trails as part of a series of coast-to-coast greenways. The connection would terminate at the Northwest Branch Trail in the vicinity of the West Hyattsville Metro station, approximately 1.8 miles west of the zero milepost, and would parallel the Green Line (Washington Metro) into D.C.

== Northeast Branch Trail ==
2.5 miles (4 km) of trail located predominantly along the levee of the Northeast Branch of the Anacostia River in Riverdale Park. The trail's zero milepost is in Hyattsville, just north of the confluence of the Northeast and Northwest Branches of the Anacostia. It continues up to the levee to Edmonston.

The first 1.5 miles of the Northeast Branch from Riverdale Road to Calvert Road (renamed Campus Drive) in Riverdale (now College Park) opened in 1977 and was originally named the Denis Wolf Trail by M-NCPPC. It was named for Wolf, a cyclist killed by a drunk driver in 1974, after Wolf's family raised $3,000 for the trail. The first trail section, which eventually extended for about 5 miles south to Decatur Street, was built as part of the Northeast Branch Relief Sewer project. Eventually, the Denis Wolf trail was absorbed into the Northeast Branch Trail, but a Denis Wolf Rest Stop, built in 1977, still exists just south of Campus Drive.

=== Indian Creek Trail ===
1 mile (1.8 km) of trail constructed around Lake Artemesia in the vicinity of Greenbelt. The Northeast Branch Trail terminates at the zero milepost of the Paint Branch Trail, where this trail and several other trails split off towards Greenbelt Park. Lake Artemesia Park and the trails around it opened on July 23, 1992. Sand, soil and gravel were needed to construct Metro's Green Line and those materials were taken from the land the park sits on now, with the removal creating the basin for the lakes.

=== Paint Branch Trail ===
The portion of trail connected to the ATTS consists of 3.7 miles (6.0 km) of signed trail between the College Park Airport and Museum and Cherry Hill Road in College Park.

A separate system of trails in the upper Paint Branch watershed has been constructed in the Montgomery County portion of Paint Branch Park. The two trail systems are separated by the fall line and the Beltway.

=== Little Paint Branch Trail ===
In 2018-19, the M-NCPPC extended the Little Paint Branch Trail 2.1 miles from its terminus at the Beltsville Community Center to Cherry Hill Road where it connected to the Paint Branch Trail becoming an extension of the ATTS.

== Anacostia River Trail ==
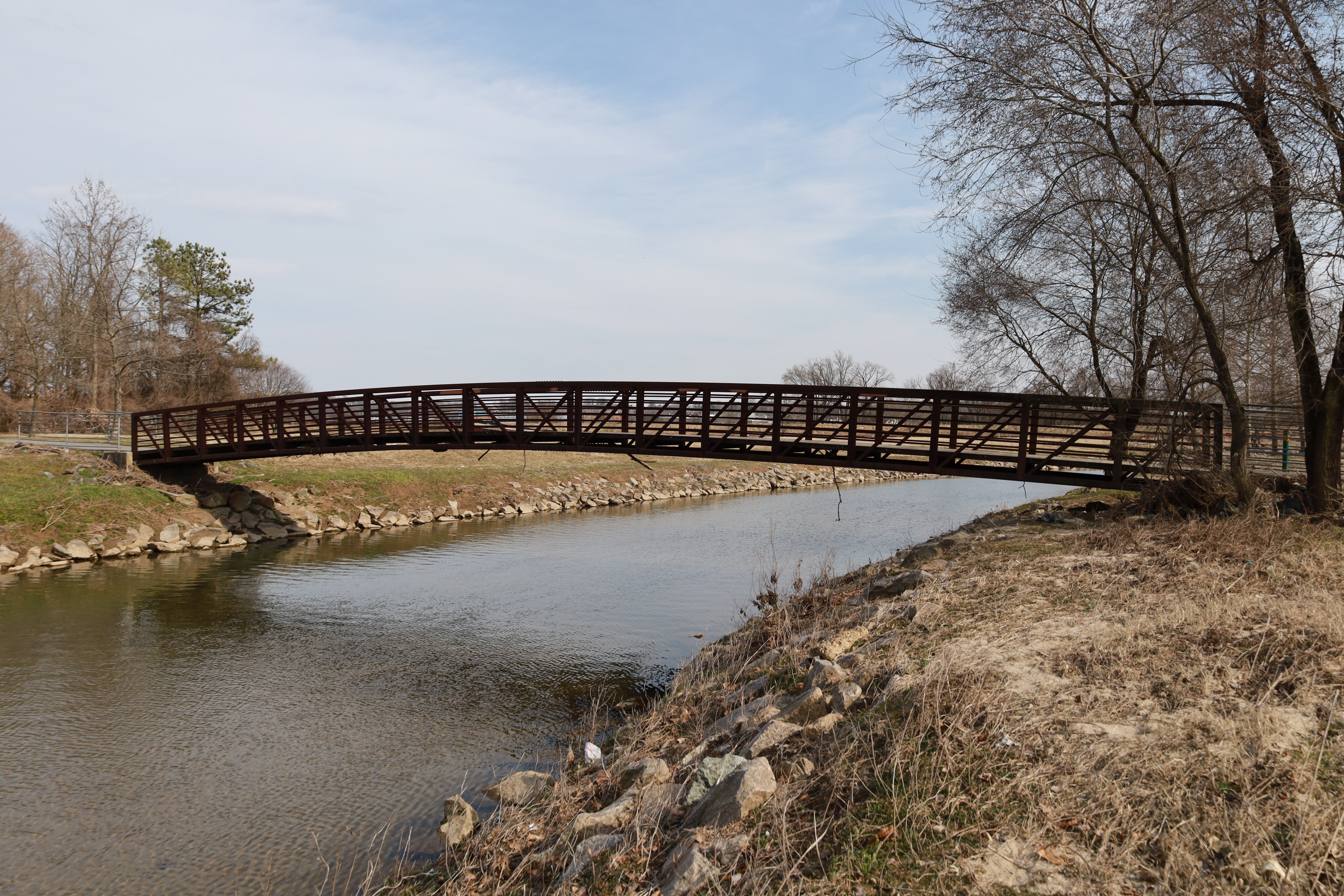
Anacostia Trail NW Branch crossing

The Anacostia River Trail consists of 3.1 miles (5.0 km) of trail located in northwest Prince George's County along the head of the Anacostia. The trail starts in Hyattsville, southeast of the intersection of Charles Armentrout Drive and Baltimore Avenue along the Northeast Branch. From there it follows the Northeast Branch to the head of the Anacostia River and follows that south where it splits in two at the trail bridge over the Anacostia to Bladensburg Waterfront Park. The west side trail ends at Colmar Manor Community Park and the east side trail ends at the District boundary just north of the New York Avenue Bridge where it continues as DC's Anacostia River Trail.

The east side trail from Colmar Manor, through Cottage City to Hyattsville was built in the late 1990's. In 2005, the trail bridge linking Bladensburg and Colmar Manor was completed. In November 2011, the 1.5 miles (2.4 km) section of the west side trail from the waterfront park to an unnamed tributary just north of the District boundary, built in part as environmental mitigation for the new Woodrow Wilson Bridge, was opened. The trail was completed to the boundary in 2016 as part of a stimulus project and opened on Halloween of that year.

== See also ==
- Anacostia River
  - Northwest Branch
  - Paint Branch
- Sligo Creek
  - Sligo Creek Trail
- Metropolitan Branch Trail
- Hyattsville, Maryland
