= Top of the Park =

Condominiums in Maryland

Coordinates: 38°59′54″N 77°0′30″W

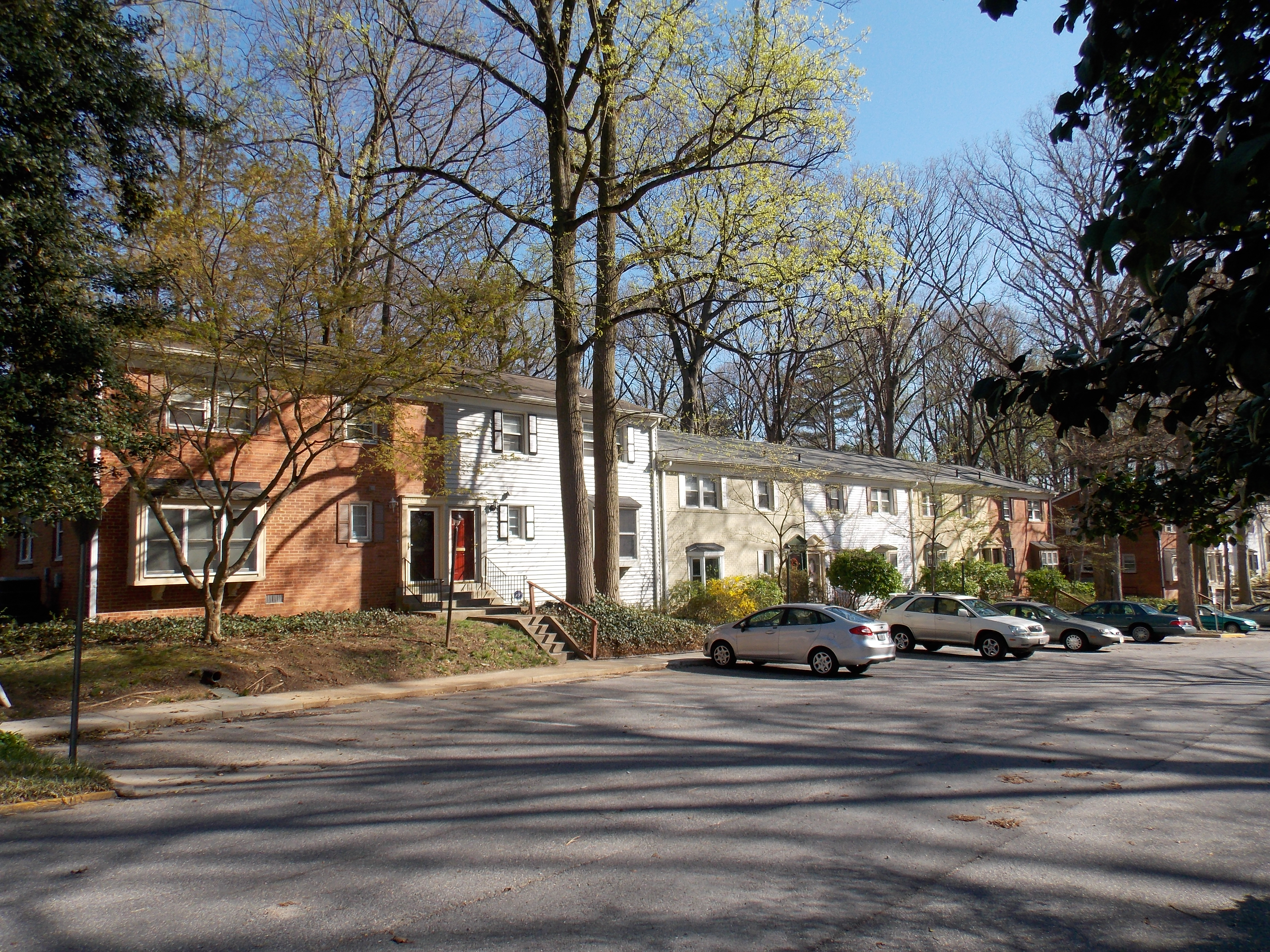
Top of the Park

Top of the Park is a community of historic townhouse condominia located in Silver Spring, Maryland. It was built as an apartment complex in 1941 and converted into 2-and 3-bedroom condominia in 1980. The 166 townhouses – all built of red brick in the Colonial Revival style – are nestled in a wooded area above Sligo Creek Park near Piney Branch Road, about a mile from downtown Silver Spring.
