= Sligo Creek Trail =

Paved hiker/biker trail in Maryland, US

Coordinates: 38.959°N 76.974°W

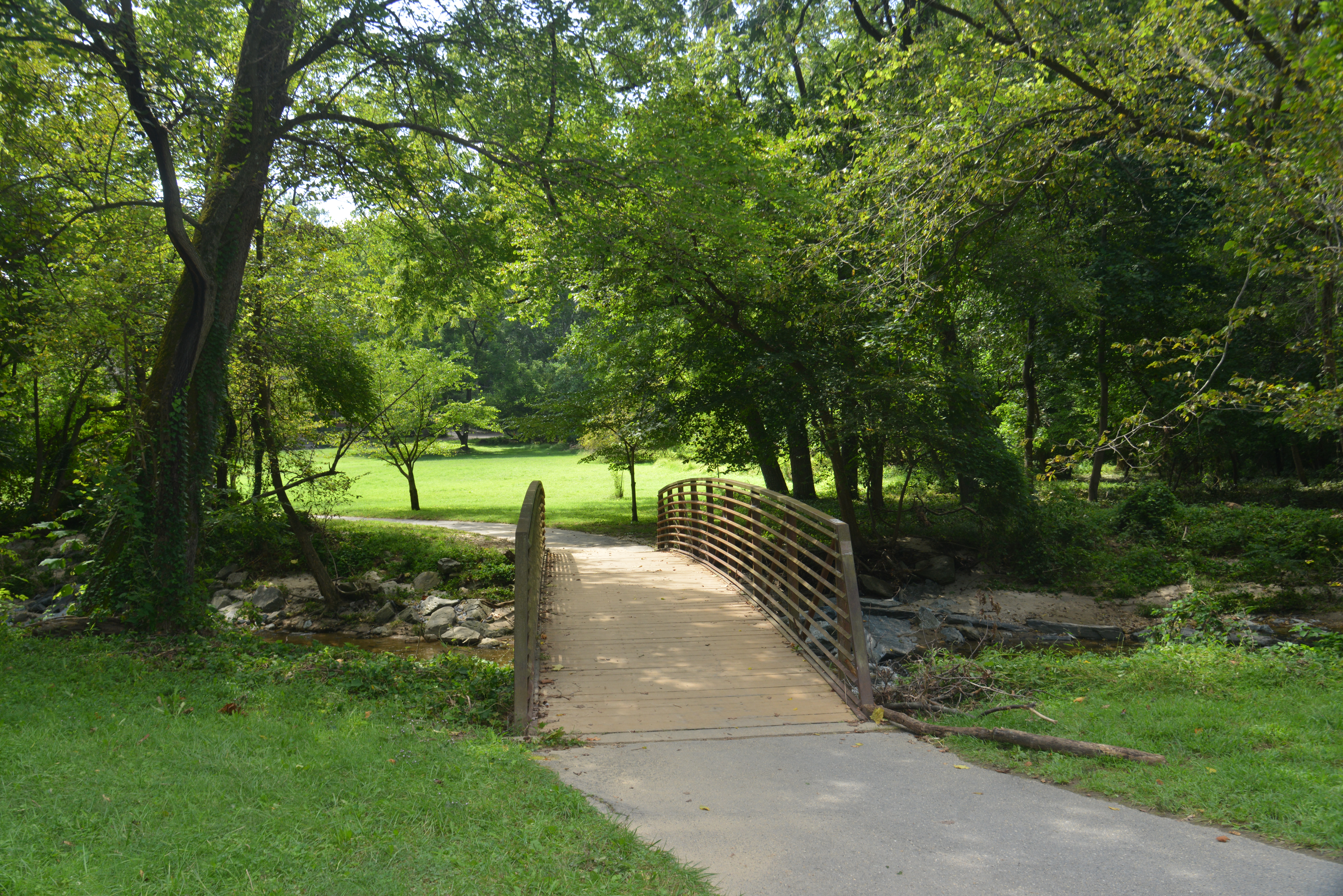
- Sligo Creek Trail, Silver Spring, Maryland
- Length: 10.2 mi (16.4 km)
- Location: Sligo Creek, Montgomery County, Maryland
- Trailheads: Carole Highlands, Maryland; Wheaton, Maryland
- Use: Walking, jogging, biking
- Difficulty: Easy, level, ADA accessible
- Season: Year-round
- Months: Year-round
- Surface: Asphalt

Sligo Creek Trail is a paved hiker-biker trail running along Sligo Creek in the suburbs of Washington, D.C. Most of the trail passes through tree-filled parkland. The trail and surrounding park is a popular place for locals to jog, walk, bicycle, roller-skate, and take their children to the playground. Many local families enjoy picnicking at one of the 15 picnic areas along the trail.

== History ==
The trail and the Sligo Creek Parkway have their origins in 1927 with the establishment of the Maryland-National Capital Park and Planning Commission, which was charged with creating a park system in the Maryland suburbs of Washington, DC. Plans for the Sligo Creek Parkway were developed in 1929 and land acquisition started the next year, aided by the Capper-Crampton Act of 1930. Construction of the road occurred in three phases between 1930 and 1954.

The first section of the road, between Park Valley Road and Colesville Road, opened on September 1, 1934, with a parallel bridle path that was later paved to make the trail. Originally there was to be a narrow road on each side of Sligo Creek—an East and West Drive—and a bridle path in-between them. Actual construction resulted in one, wider road on the West Drive alignment south of Maple Avenue and on the East Drive alignment north of there. The bridle path meanwhile was built primarily on the alignment of "East Drive" south of Maple and on the bridle path north of it.

The section of trail from Piney Branch Road to Riggs Road was built in the 1990s, opening in June 1997, as a community amenity to allow for the construction of a storm sewer reclamation project by the Washington Suburban Sanitary Commission. This section was aligned to follow the path of the storm drain through the narrow valley in the vicinity of the Fall Line.

After the trail was paved trail bridges over the creek were either added or upgraded, with most of them built in 2001 and installed between 1994 and 2002, though about nine bridges predate this work. In some places, the trail was moved as bridges have been relocated, recreational facilities have been added or altered, or the course of the stream has changed.

== Location ==
Heading upstream from southeast (closest to DC) to northwest (farthest from DC):

The Prince George's County section is about 1.6 miles (2.6 km) long. It begins at the intersection with the Northwest Branch Trail of the Anacostia Tributary Trail System, crosses Riggs Road, passes behind the Parklawn Community Recreational Center, crosses East-West Highway and ends in Carole Highlands.

=== Junction list ===
The Montgomery County section is about 7.3 miles (11.7 km) long. It begins in Carole Highlands and ends inside the Wheaton Regional Recreation Park (WRRP).

Between Carole Highlands and WRRP, Sligo Creek Trail crosses (in this order):

- New Hampshire Avenue
- (passes underneath Carroll Avenue)
- Maple Avenue
- Piney Branch Road
- Wayne Avenue
- Colesville Road
- (passes underneath the Capital Beltway)
- Forest Glen Road
- Dennis Avenue
- University Boulevard
- (crosses Arcola Avenue via a trail connector)
Different parts of the Sligo Creek Trail

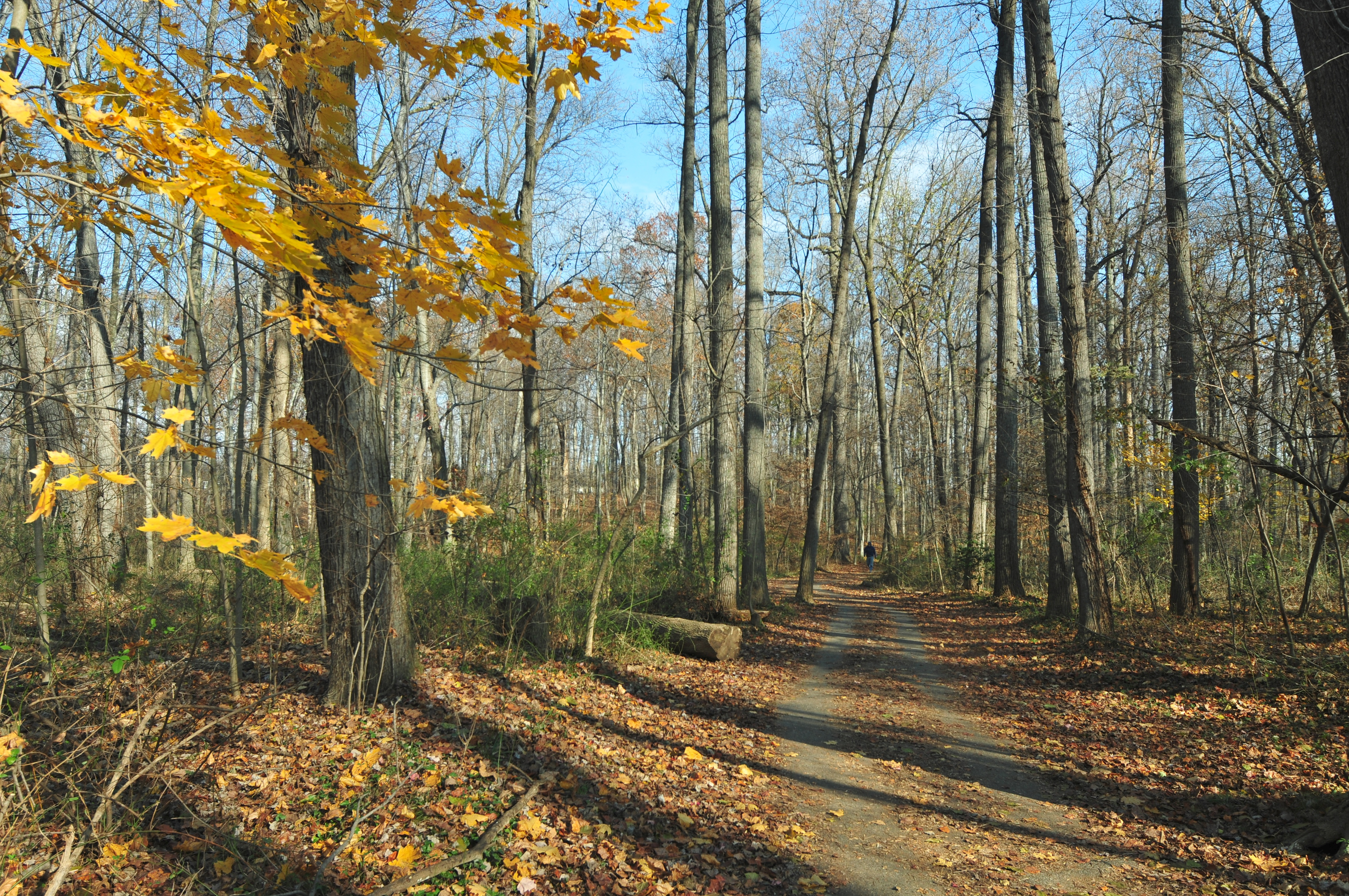
In the Fall, Forest Glen

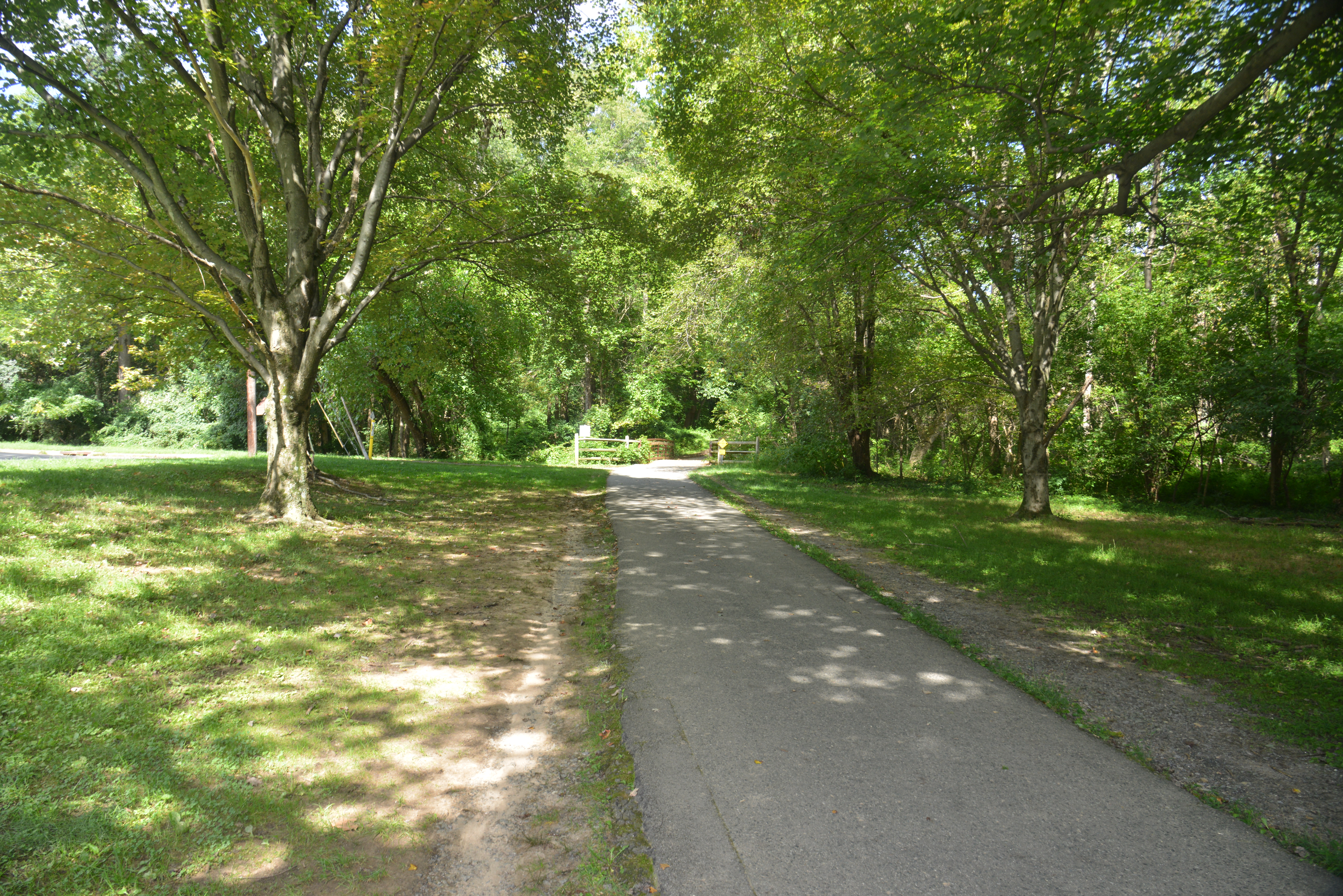
Sligo Creek Trail in Silver Spring

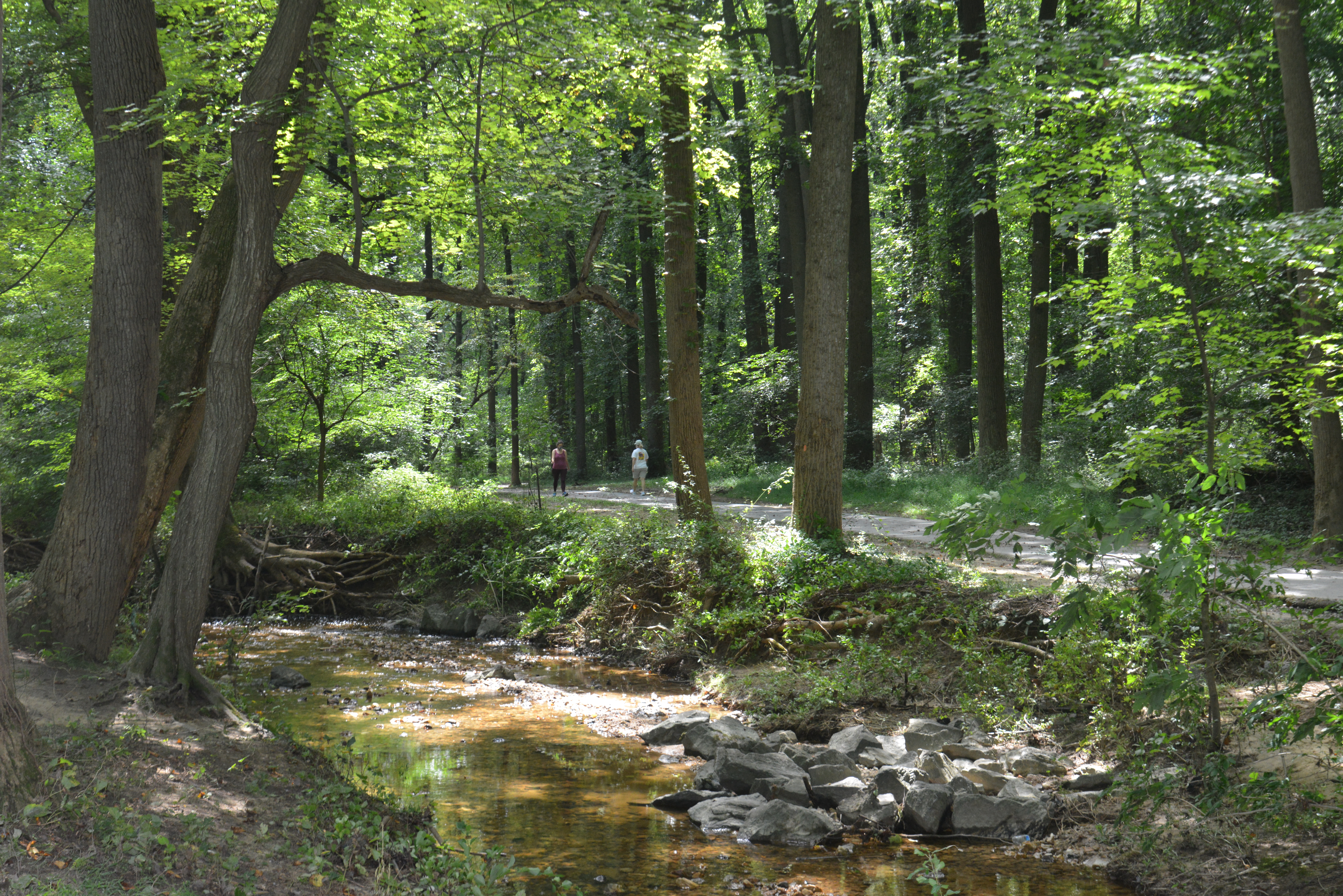
Sligo Creek with the Sligo Creek Trail in the background

== See also ==
- Sligo Creek Parkway
- Anacostia Tributary Trails
- Metropolitan Branch Trail
