= Rhode Island Avenue Trolley Trail =

Rail trail in Maryland, US

Coordinates: 38°59′35.7″N 76°55′37.5″W

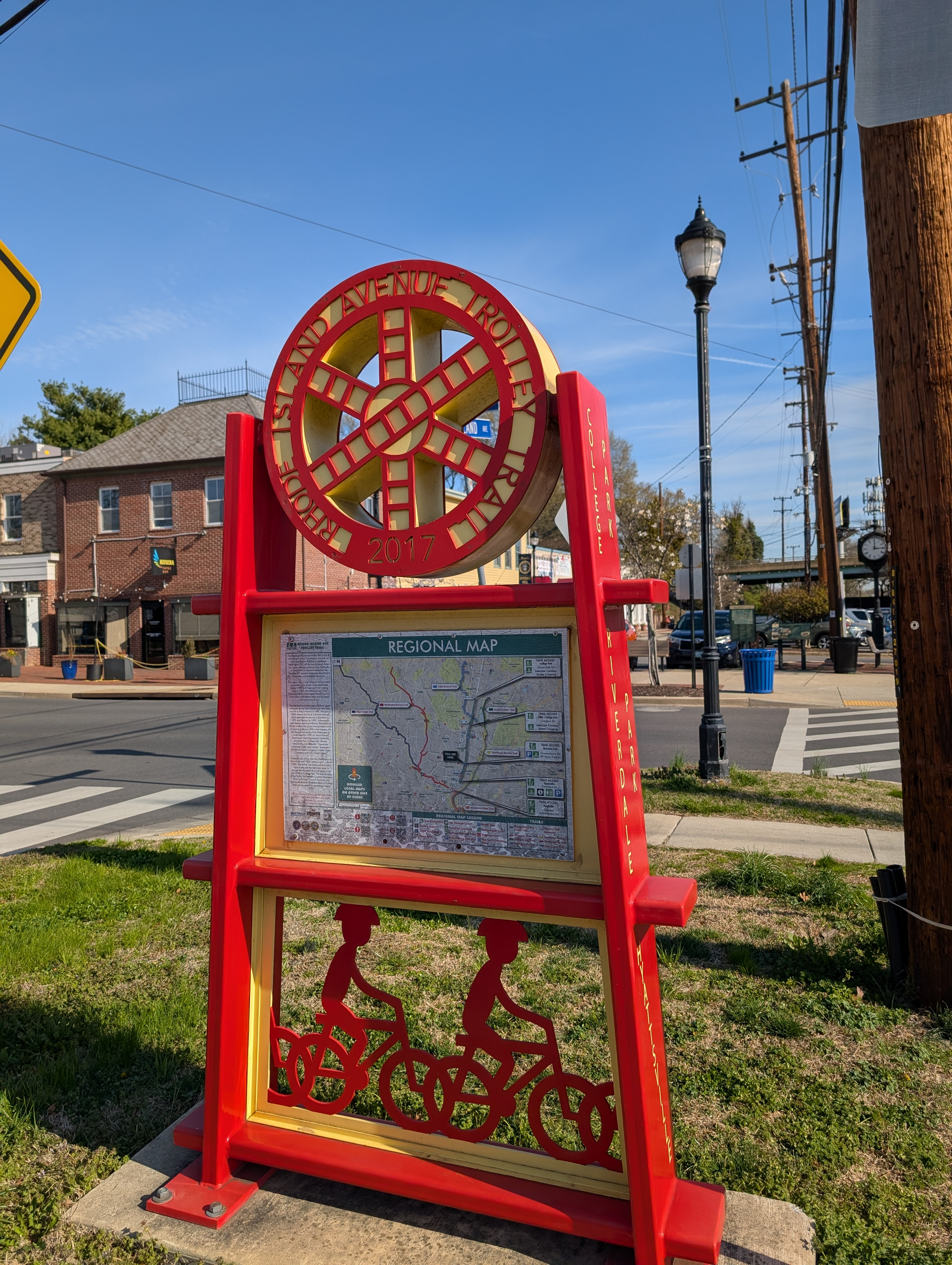
One of the wayfinding signs on the Rhode Island Avenue Trolley Trail

Map

The Rhode Island Avenue Trolley Trail (formerly known as the College Park Trolley Trail) is a 3.9-mile-long (6.3 km) rail trail within the cities of College Park, Riverdale Park, and Hyattsville, Maryland. It connects to the Anacostia Tributary Trail System and is located within the Anacostia Trails Heritage Area.

== Description ==
The trail is built on part of the abandoned right-of-way of the City and Suburban Railway. On the southern end, the trail begins at the end of Charles Armentrout Drive in Hyattsville where it intersects with the Northwest Branch Trail. It then travels along Route 1 and the west side of the railroad tracks through Hyatsville. It continues into the town of Riverdale Park and to the Riverdale Park Railroad station before moving away from the railroad through the Riverdale Park Station mixed-use development. It then crosses into the town of College Park and follows the right-of-way alongside and through the median of existing sections of Rhode Island Avenue to Calvert Street, where it becomes a sidepath alongside the avenue. At Rossborough Lane, the trail resumes and, across Campus Drive, it is shared by the Paint Branch Trail of the Anacostia Tributary Trail System for a short distance. The trail is on-road between Pierce Avenue and Berwyn House Road before resuming. The last piece of trail passes through the Berwyn Neighborhood Playground on its way to the northern trailhead at Greenbelt Road.

The bike lanes along Rhode Island Avenue from Greenbelt Road to Paducah Street/Edgewood Road in the Hollywood section of College Park are no longer considered part of the Trolley Trail, as they are fully on-road bike lanes.

== History ==
The right of way was originally Route 82 of the streetcar system of Washington, DC. The right of way south of Riverdale Park used by the trail was built by the City and Suburban Railway in 1899 and the right of way north of Riverdale Park was built by the Berwyn and Laurel Electric Railroad Company in 1902. The full line stretched from New York Avenue and 15th Street NW in Washington, D.C., to Berwyn at Greenbelt Road, where a turntable was built, before the line was extended to Laurel, Maryland in 1902. City and Suburban, which later acquired the Berwyn and Laurel, operated cars on the line until 1926 when it was absorbed by the Washington Railway and Electric Company, which in 1933 became part of Capital Transit and in 1955 DC Transit. During that time, the line was shortened, running only to Beltsville by 1948 and only to Berwyn by 1956. In 1956, Congress decided to replace the streetcars with buses and on September 7, 1958, the last streetcar ran the route.

In the 1970's Maryland acquired the line from the District to Farragut Street in Hyattsville and, by 1980, had used it to widen Rhode Island Ave/Route 1. In 1993, portions of the right-of-way between Hyattsville and Ammendale were taken over by the Riders' Fund, which was created in 1990 to settle two cases that challenged D.C. Transit's fare increases of the 1960s and 1970s. Much of it was eventually sold for the Rhode Island Avenue Rail Trail.

The first section of the trail, a 1.1-mile-long (1.8 km) stretch north from Campus Drive (formerly known as Paint Branch Parkway) to Greenbelt Road in College Park, opened in 2002. A second 1.5-mile-long (2.4 km) section, in the form of bike lanes on Rhode Island Avenue, from Greenbelt Road north to Paducah Road opened in 2005. The bike lanes are no longer branded as part of the trail. In 2007, a third section south of the existing trail from Calvert Road to Albion Road in Riverdale Park opened. These three sections were originally called the "College Park Trolley Trail."

In 2008 a plan was formed to extend the trail south to Riverdale and Hyattsville and rebrand it as the "Rhode Island Avenue Trolley Trail."

In 2012 work on the southern extension began with a five-block-long section from Madison Street to Hamilton Street in Hyattsville, which was built as part of the EYA Arts District development. In 2013–14, that section was extended south to Farragut Street and north to Queensberry Road by the Maryland–National Capital Park and Planning Commission. By 2016, that segment was extended north to Tuckerman Street.

In late 2017, wayfinding signage kiosks and a formal website for the trail were created.

In November 2017, the first of the Riverdale Station sections, from Albion Road to 47th Street and from Tuckerman Street to just south of Van Buren Street opened. In November 2018, the short section from 47th Street to Woodberry Street in Riverdale Park was completed and opened. In 2020–21, the one-block-section from Van Buren to Woodbury was finished, completing the Riverdale Station section and creating a contiguious trail from Farragut Street in Hyattsville to Greenbelt Road in College Park.

During the construction of the southern portion of the trail, sections of the northern portion were also improved. In 2011, a new trail crossing at Campus Drive was constructed. In 2013, the trail gap between Calvert Road and Campus Drive was closed when a segment was built as a sidepath along Rhode Island Avenue. In early 2017, a section of the sound barrier south of Campus Drive was removed to allow the trail to pass straight through rather than divert around the barrier.

In 2022, the Maryland State Highway Administration began work on the final southern extension from Farragut Street to Charles Armentrout Drive in Hyattsville, connecting the trail to the Northwest Branch Trail. The project was conducted alongside a road diet narrowing of the northbound side of U.S. Route 1 parallel to the trail. The official ribbon-cutting marking the opening of the trail section was on December 5, 2023.

The Maryland Department of Transportation plans to improve the Greenbelt Road–University Boulevard pedestrian-crossing in College Park in the future.
