= NoMa =

Neighborhood in Washington, D.C., U.S.

Coordinates: 38°54′23.4″N 77°0′17.7″W

- Neighborhood of Washington, D.C.
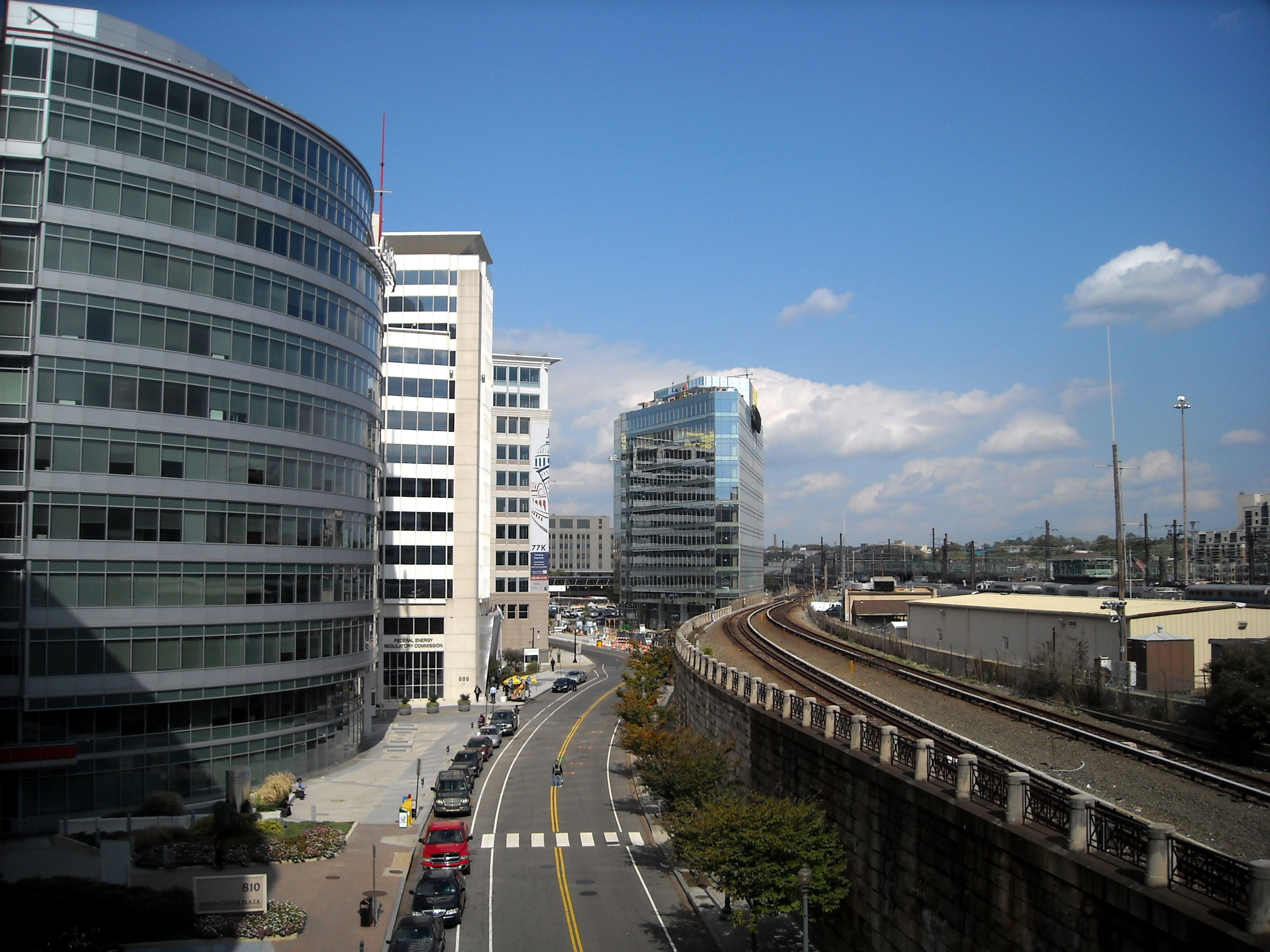
- First Street N.E. in "NoMa" with the Washington Metro's Red Line visible (on the right)
- Interactive map of NoMa
- Country: United States
- District: Washington, D.C.
- Ward: Ward 6

Government
  - Councilmember: Charles Allen

Population (2023 estimate)
  - Total: 13,000
- Postal code: ZIP Code
- Website: www.nomabid.org

NoMa (short for "north of Massachusetts Avenue") is a neighborhood of Washington, D.C., located in Ward 6 of the city. The neighborhood encompasses the region north of Massachusetts Avenue located north and east of Union Station. It includes the Sursum Corda, Eckington, and Near Northeast areas, as well as a section known as Swampoodle.

== Definition ==
NoMa includes:

- A core area consisting of all the blocks bounded by North Capitol Street on the west, Q Street NE on the north, the Amtrak/MARC railroad on the east and K Street NE on the south,
- To the south of the core area, one to two blocks west of the railroad tracks/Union Station from K Street south to Massachusetts Avenue,
- To the northeast of the core area, one to two blocks east of the railroad tracks from K Street north to Florida Avenue, and
- To the north of the core area, the blocks between First Street NE and the railroad tracks from Q to R streets

NoMa's southern tip at Union Station/Columbus Circle is a half-mile north of the U.S. Capitol.

== Demographics ==
According to the NoMa Business Improvement District, the neighborhood was home to 13,000 residents as of January 2023, with a total of 50,000 employees working in the area. 2020 Census data showed that Ward 6 which includes parts of NoMa, Navy Yard and Southwest, was responsible for a third of D.C.'s 15% population growth over the previous decade.

== History ==
After much planning for the area in the late 1990s, the 2004 opening of the New York Ave–Florida Ave Metro, now NoMa-Gallaudet U station, sparked development in the neighborhood. Its name was reportedly chosen to nickname the nomenclature of New York City neighborhoods such as SoHo and TriBeCa.

By 2016, NoMa had emerged as a rapidly-growing neighborhood in D.C. The New York Times summarized the shift, stating "NoMa now has about 6,400 people living in about 3,800 apartments; there were none in 2010". REI opened one of its outdoor supply big box stores in the renovated Washington Coliseum, where the N.B.A.’s Capitols had played in the 1940s.

A longstanding homeless encampment under the K Street underpass was cleared in 2020, with similar encampments under the L Street and M Street underpasses cleared in 2021. Most of the unhoused people agreed to move into apartments as part of a city program. The underpasses had previously been cleared around 100 times, but people returned soon thereafter. The city's removal of the encampments drew criticism after a bulldozer operator accidentally began to clear a tent with a man inside, and who was hospitalized as a result.

== Landmarks ==
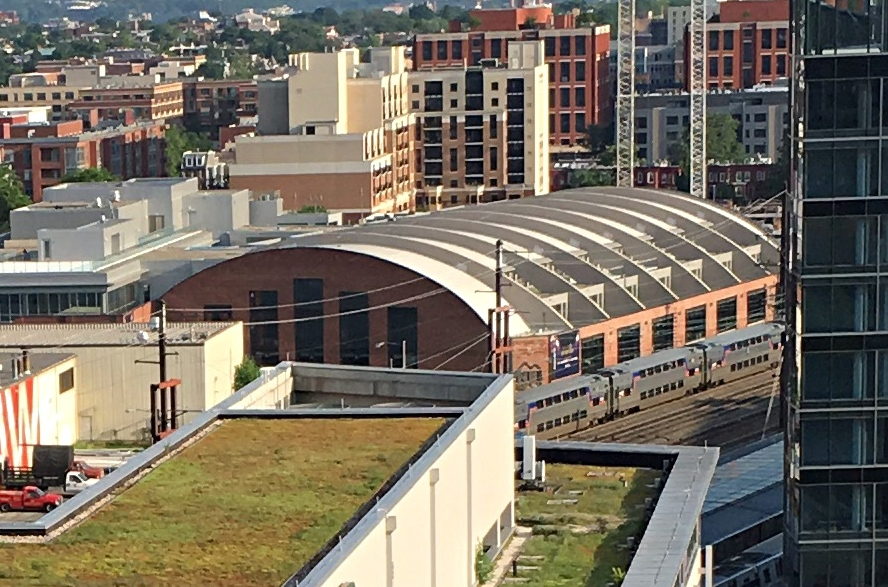
An aerial view of the historic Uline Arena, now a renovated REI store

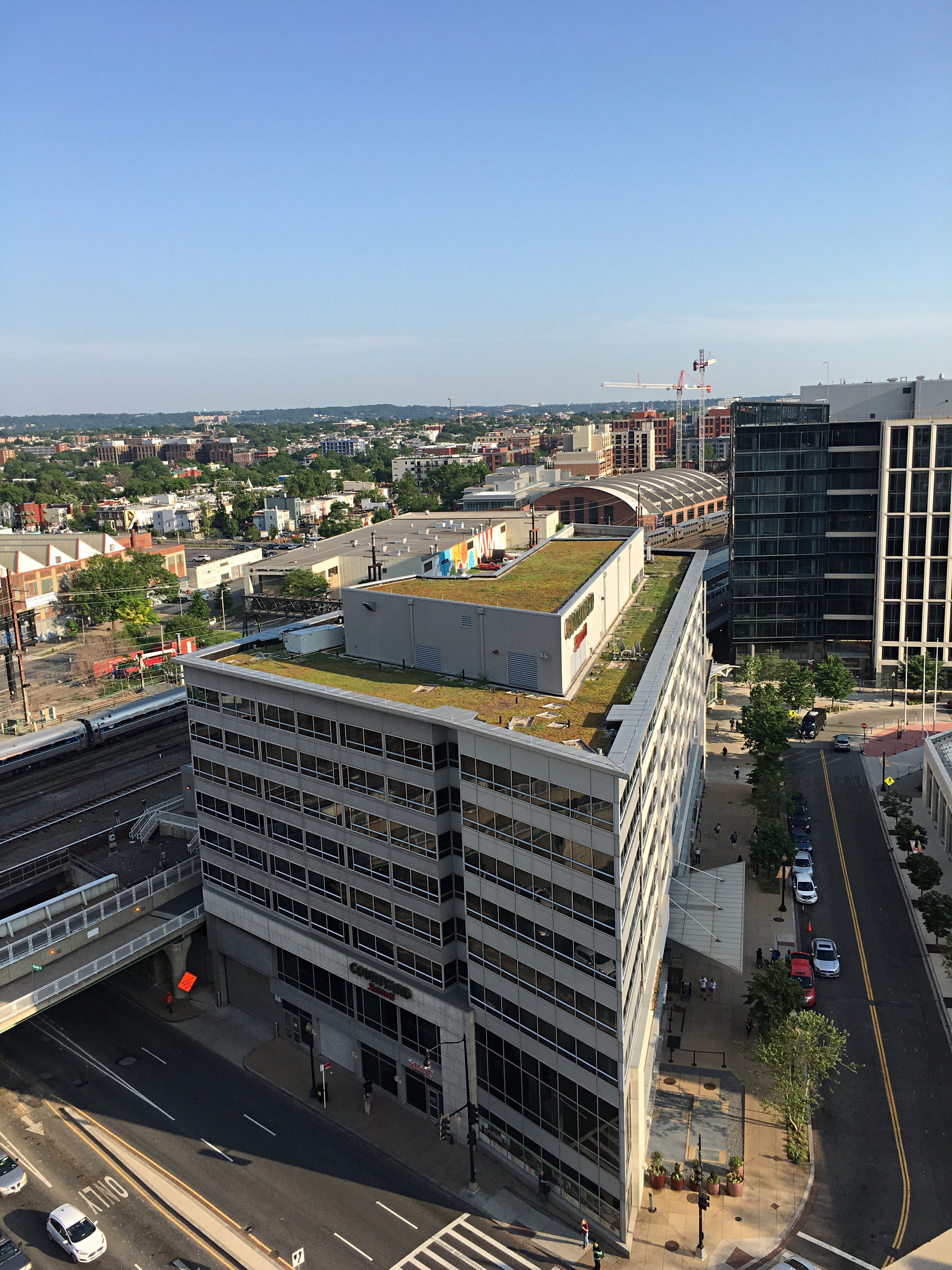
A portion of NoMa in 2017

NoMa includes several historic structures:

- the Woodward & Lothrop Service Warehouse (on the National Register of Historic Places)
- the Uline Arena
- St. Aloysius Church
- Gonzaga College High School
- the Government Printing Office building
- Bureau of Alcohol, Tobacco, Firearms and Explosives

Union Market borders NoMa on the east and has a gourmet food hall, retail non-food stalls and a rooftop with bar, picnic tables and event stage.

== Transportation ==
The area is served by many modes of transportation, including:

- Washington Metro Rail, with stations at NoMa-Gallaudet U station and Union Station both on the Red Line
- MARC commuter trains to Maryland and West Virginia at Union Station
- VRE commuter trains to Virginia at Union Station
- Amtrak long-distance trains, and Northeast Corridor trains including Acela, at Union Station
- bus, including local (WMATA), suburban, and intercity services
- bicycle, including the Metropolitan Branch Trail, bicycle lanes and Capital Bikeshare stations
- on foot: according to Walk Score, NoMa received a score of 93, indicating good walkability

== Education ==
Eighteen schools serve the NoMa neighborhood, from pre-K to university.
