= Northwest Branch Anacostia River =

Anacostia River tributary in Maryland, U.S.

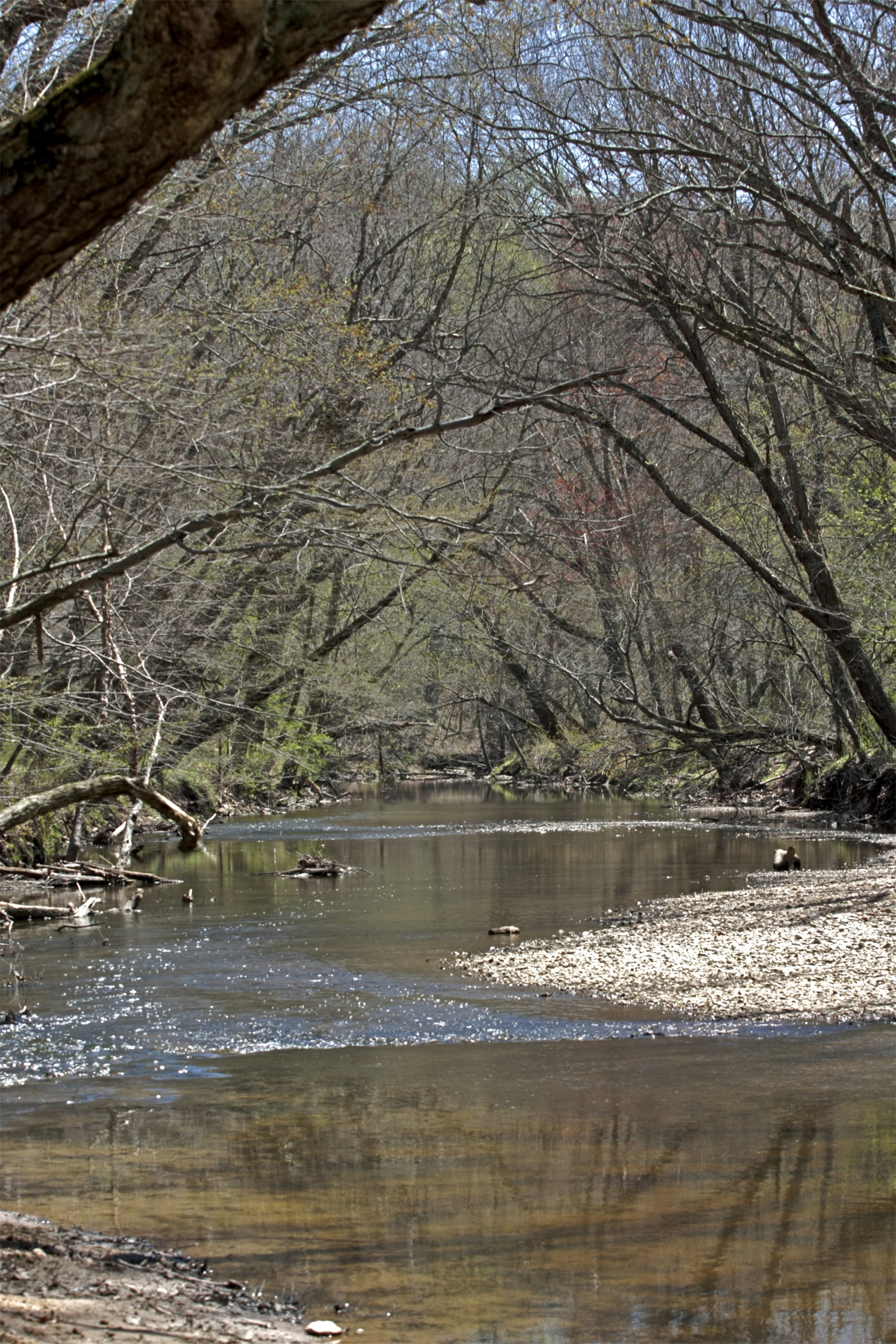

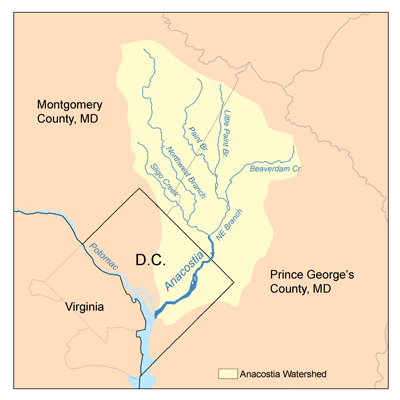
- Map of the Anacostia River watershed showing the Northwest Branch

Location
- Country: United States
- State: Maryland
- Cities: Wheaton, Silver Spring, Hyattsville

Physical characteristics
- Source
  - location: Sandy Spring, Maryland
- Mouth: Anacostia River
  - location: Bladensburg, MD
  - coordinates: 38.942832°N 76.944036°W
- Length: 21.5 mi (34.6 km)
- Basin size: 53.5 sq mi (139 km^{2})

Basin features
- Tributaries
  - left: Old Orchard, Bryants Nursery, Norwood, Rolling Stone
  - right: Bachelors Forest, Longmeade, Bel Pre Creek, Wheaton Park, Lamberton Dr, Sligo Creek

Northwest Branch Anacostia River is a 21.5-mile-long (34.6 km) free-flowing stream in Montgomery County and Prince George's County, Maryland. It is a tributary of the Anacostia River, which flows to the Potomac River and the Chesapeake Bay.

== Course ==
The headwaters of the Northwest Branch are located near the community of Sandy Spring. The stream flows southward for 21.5 miles (34.6 km) to its confluence with the Northeast Branch near Bladensburg to form the main stem of the Anacostia.

== Watershed ==
The watershed in Montgomery County includes portions of the communities of Norwood, Bel Pre Manor, Colesville, Layhill, Glenmont, Wheaton, Hillandale, White Oak, Silver Spring, Kemp Mill, Four Corners, Woodmoor and Takoma Park. The Prince George's County portion of the watershed includes Adelphi, Langley Park, University Park, Chillum, Hyattsville, Avondale and Brentwood. The total watershed area, including a small portion of land in Washington, D.C., is 53.5 square miles (139 km^{2}), with a resident population of about 254,000.

The middle section of the Northwest Branch is referred to as the Rachel Carson Environmental Area. It flows through a small gorge underneath the Capital Beltway between Colesville Road and Adelphi Mill. Located at the north end of the Northwest Branch Trail, near the home of noted environmental author Rachel Carson, it is deliberately left rustic and unimproved.

The majority of the Northwest Branch stream valley is a riparian buffer, protected as parkland by the Maryland-National Capital Park and Planning Commission (M-NCPPC). The Rachel Carson Greenway planned by M-NCPPC will extend the Northwest Branch Trail into northern Montgomery County as an unimproved hiking trail, connecting to the Anacostia Tributary Trail System in Prince George's County.

== Geology ==
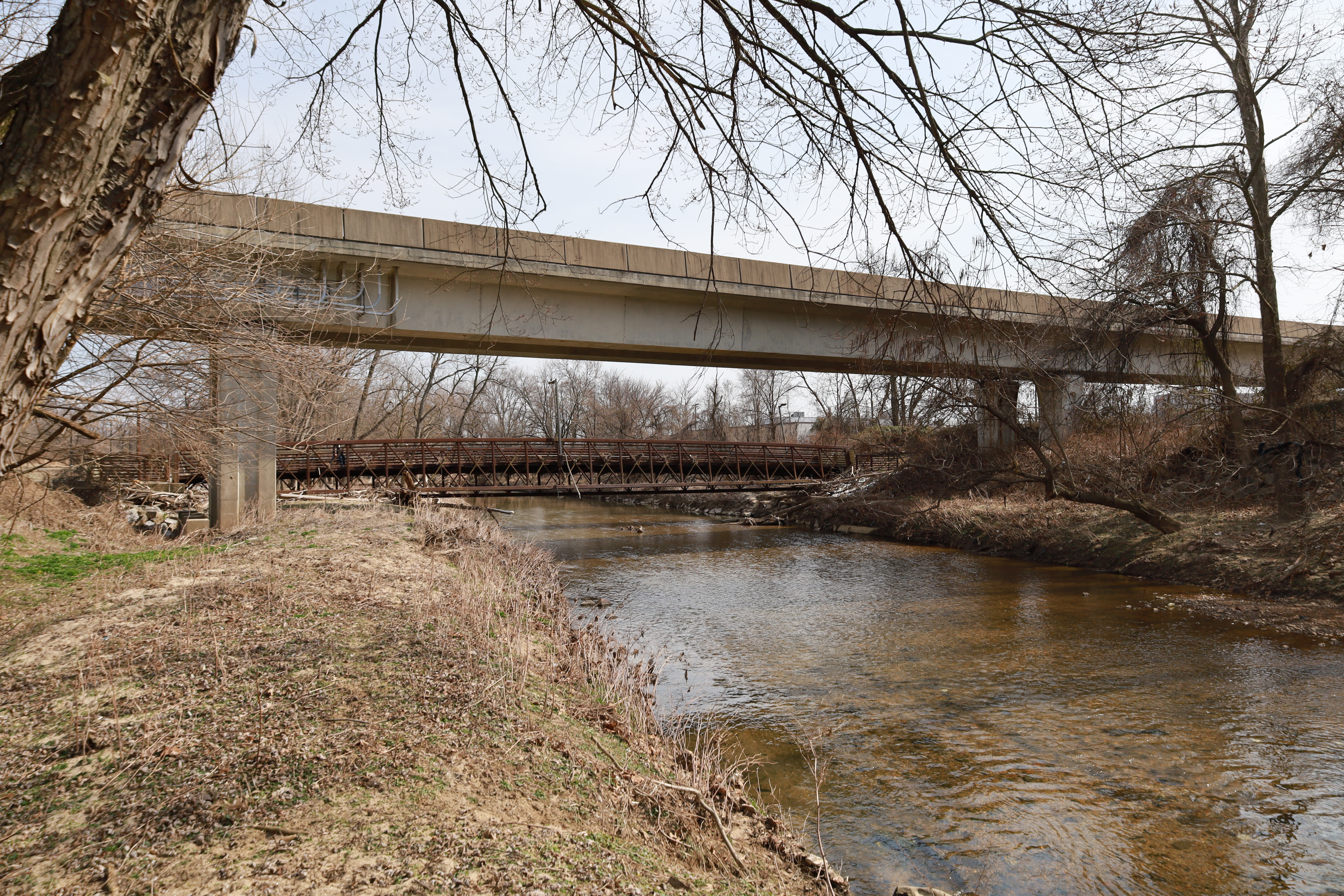
The Northwest Branch underneath the Green and Yellow Lines of the Washington Metro near the West Hyattsville station

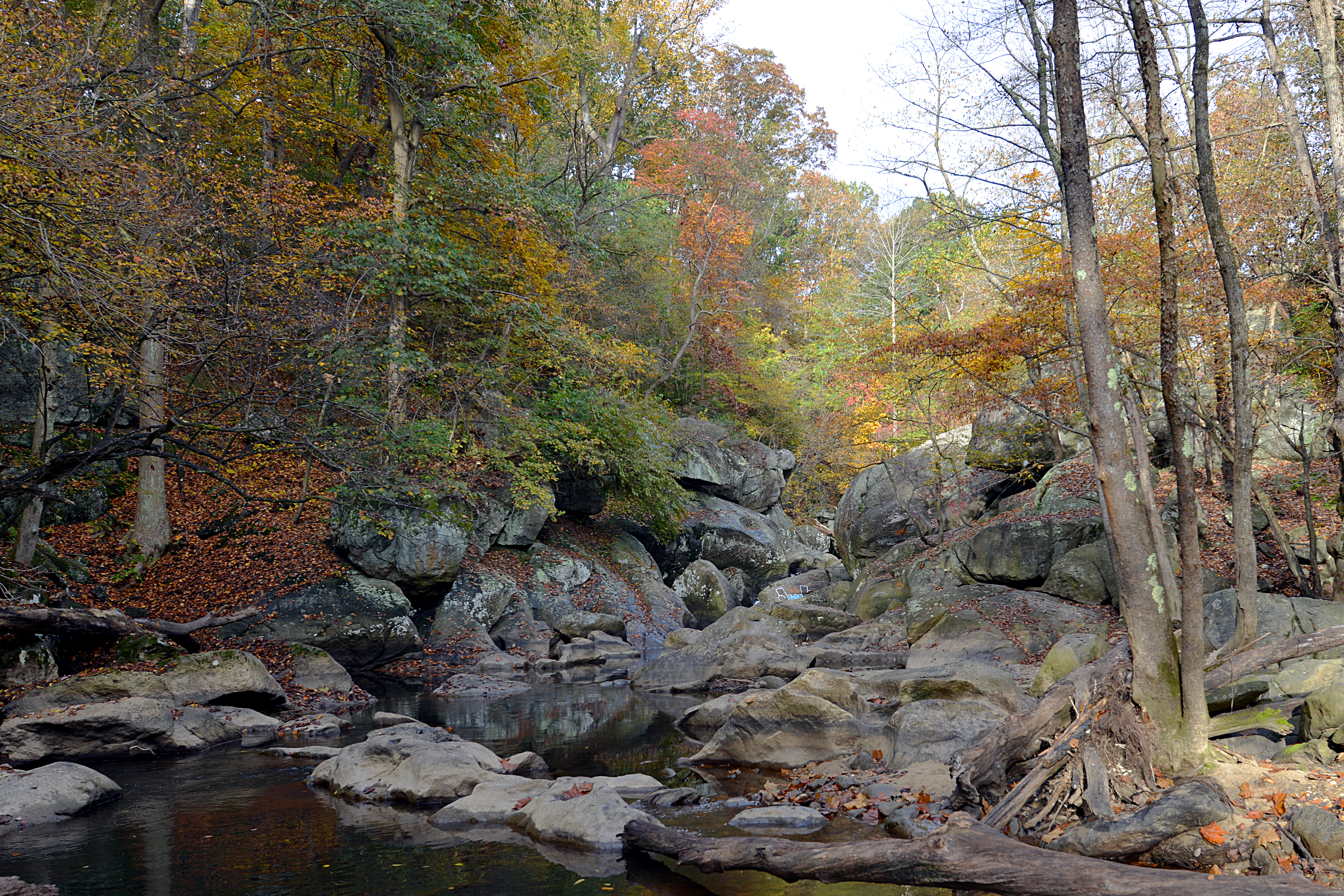
The Northwest Branch at the Fall Line

Northwest Branch crosses the geological fall line between the Piedmont and Atlantic coastal plain regions, which forms a small waterfall on the stream 0.5 miles (0.80 km) south of the Burnt Mills Dam parks. This area was a favorite spot of Theodore Roosevelt.

== Ecology ==
Several species of native anadromous fish spawn in the Northwest Branch watershed, including alewife (Alosa pseudoharengus) and blueback herring (Alosa aestivalis).

== Tributaries ==
The total stream channel length of Northwest Branch and all tributaries is 75 miles (121 km).

- Bachelors Forest Tributary
- Bel Pre Creek
- Bryants Nursery Tributary
- Lamberton Drive Tributary
- Lockridge Drive Tributary
- Longmeade Tributary
- Norwood Tributary
- Old Orchard Tributary
- Rolling Stone Tributary
- Sandy Spring Tributary
- Sligo Creek
- Wheaton Park Tributary

== See also ==
- List of Maryland rivers
- Anacostia Tributary Trails

== Bibliography ==
- "Northwest Branch Watershed Study" (PDF). Montgomery County Department of Environmental Protection (MCDEP). Rockville, MD. March 17, 1997.
- "Countywide Stream Protection Strategy: Northwest Branch Watershed". MCDEP.
- "Anacostia River Watershed Restoration Plan: Interim Report Framework". Anacostia Watershed Restoration Partnership. November 21, 2008. Archived from the original on September 16, 2009. "Report to Congress"
