= Rachel Carson Greenway =

Hiking trail in Maryland

Coordinates: 39°7′42″N 77°1′33″W

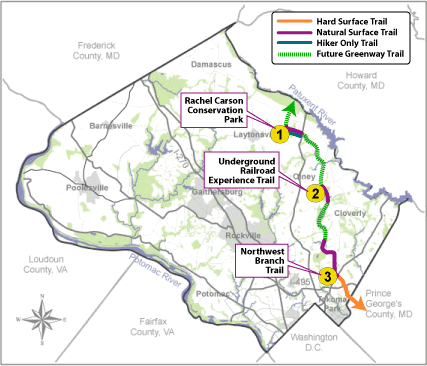
- Rachel Carson Greenway Map
- Length: About 25 miles (40 km)
- Location: Montgomery and Prince George's County, Maryland
- Use: Hiking

The Rachel Carson Greenway is a planned 25-mile stretch of trails, spanning from the historic Adelphi Mill in Prince George's County north through eastern Montgomery County, Maryland to Patuxent River State Park, and incorporating existing Northwest Branch trails. The greenway was proposed as part of a 1998 Countywide Park Trails Plan. A plan for the greenway was approved by the Montgomery County Planning Board on June 15, 2005.

The Rachel Carson Greenway would include a set of three existing trails, including the Northwest Branch trail in Silver Spring, Woodlawn Manor trails in Sandy Spring and Rachel Carson Conservation Park trails near Laytonsville. The Northwest Branch Trail Corridor was officially renamed as the Rachel Carson Greenway on March 20, 2004. The largest section of the greenway consists of a network of unimproved hiking trails through the Northwest Branch stream valley gorge in Burnt Mills, Maryland. A Sandy Spring Heritage Trail is being considered as part of the greenway trail system. In 2008, Montgomery County approved plans to extend the Rock Creek Park trail system north to Rachel Carson Conservation Park and connect with the Rachel Carson Greenway.

== Existing trails ==
As of 2011, the Greenway included three trail systems:

=== Rachel Carson Conservation Park ===
The Rachel Carson Conservation Park is a 650-acres park located near Laytonsville, in Montgomery County, Maryland. The park contains over six miles of existing hiking and equestrian trails, and Hawlings River traverses the park.

The conservation area was named in 1977 for noted environmentalist Rachel Carson, the author of Silent Spring, who lived nearby. The park includes 50.6 acres acquired by Montgomery County in 2004. The Maryland-National Capital Park and Planning Commission prepared a master plan for the park in 2000.

=== Underground Railroad Experience Trail ===
The Underground Railroad Experience Trail, located in Sandy Spring, Maryland, commemorates the Underground Railroad and Quaker traditions. The trail extends north from Woodlawn Manor Park to the Sandy Spring and then on to a 300-year-old Champion White Ash tree. This trail is a member of the National Park Service's Underground Railroad Network to Freedom.

=== Northwest Branch ===
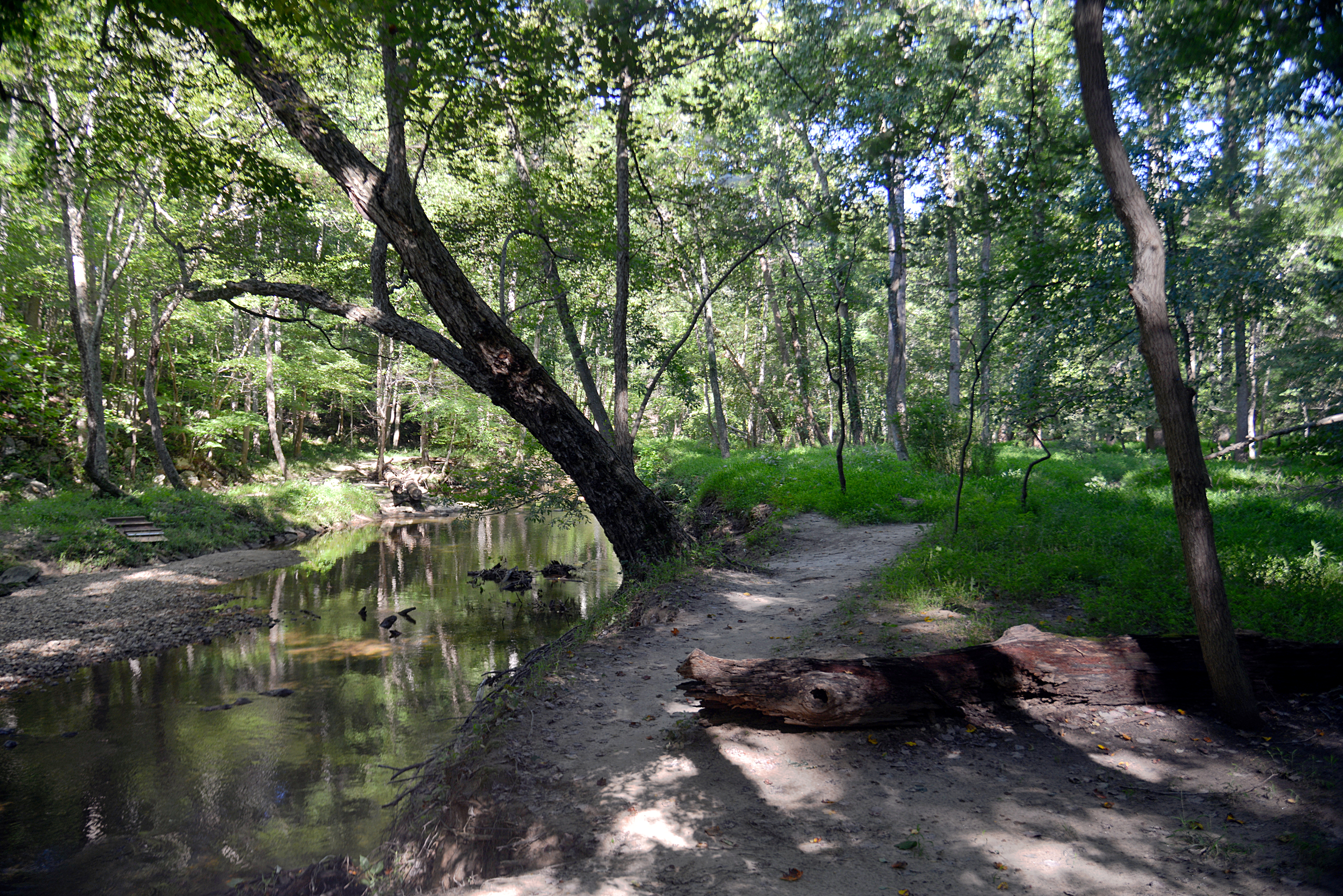
The Rachel Carson Greenway Trail north of Burnt Mills in Montgomery County, MD

Between the Burnt Mills Dam trailhead on U.S. Route 29 (Colesville Road) and Kemp Mill Road near Wheaton Regional Park the Rachel Carson Greenway Trail follows the east side of the Northwest Branch, across the creek from the Northwest Branch Trail. The trail is rustic and designated hiking only except for the stretch between Valley Brook Drive and the trail connection to the Northwest Branch Trail, where equestrian riders are also permitted.
