= NoMa–Gallaudet U station =

Washington Metro station

NoMa–Gallaudet U
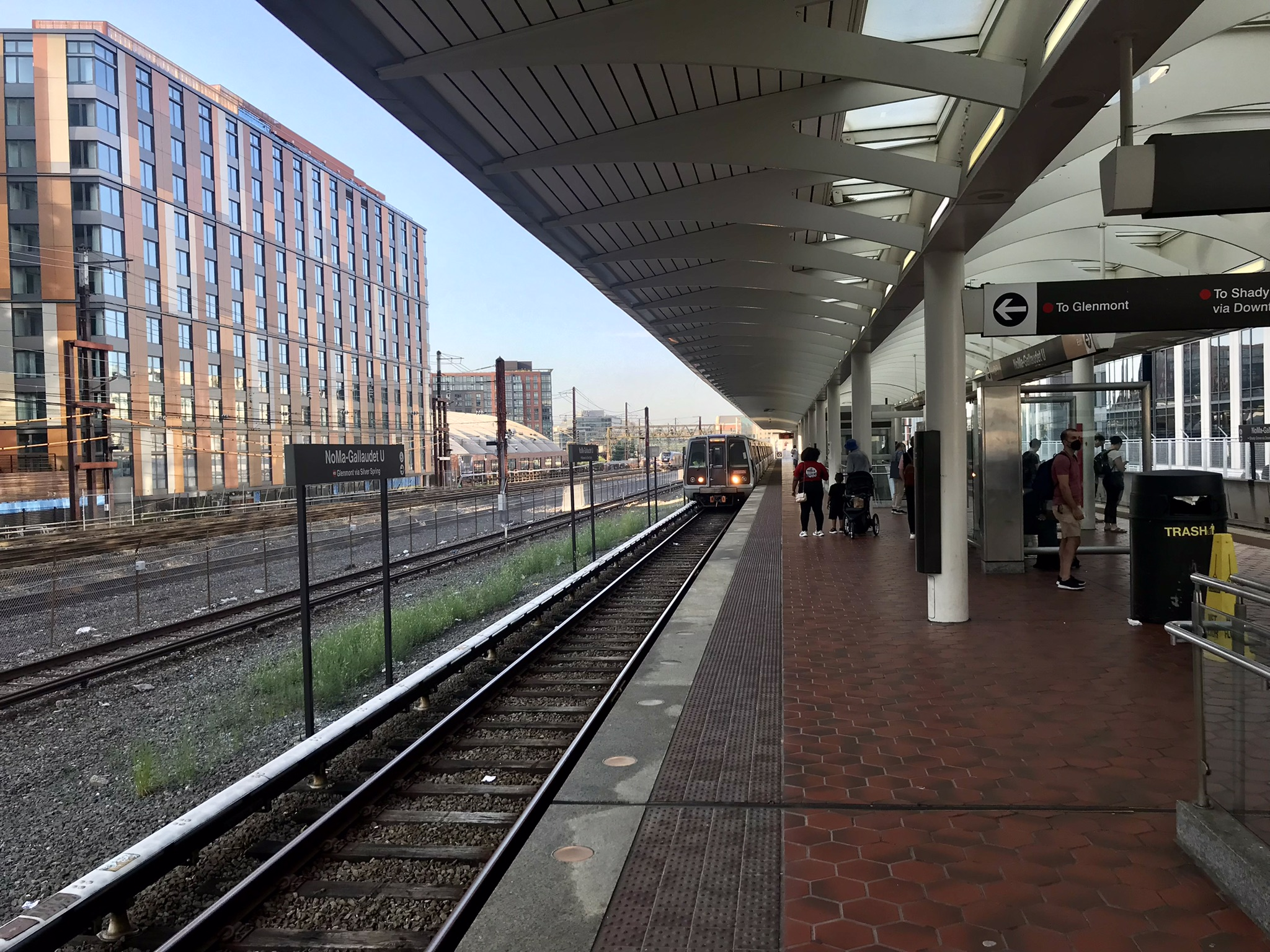
- Station platform in August 2022

General information
- Location: 200 Florida Avenue NE; Washington, D.C.
- Coordinates: 38.9070253°N 77.0031528°W
- Owner: Washington Metropolitan Area Transit Authority
- Platforms: 1 island platform
- Tracks: 2
- Connections: Metrobus: C53, C57; Metropolitan Branch Trail

Construction
- Structure type: Elevated
- Cycle facilities: Capital Bikeshare, 8 racks
- Accessible: Yes

Other information
- Station code: B3.5/B35

History
- Opened: November 20, 2004; 21 years ago
- Former names: New York Ave (planning & construction); New York Ave–Florida Ave–Gallaudet U (2004–2011)

Passengers
- 2025: 12,880 (average weekday)
- Rank: 7 of 98

Services
Preceding station	Washington Metro	Following station
Union Station toward Shady Grove	Red Line	Rhode Island Avenue toward Glenmont
Route map
Location

NoMa–Gallaudet U station is an elevated, island platformed station on the Washington Metropolitan Area Transit Authority's (WMATA) Metro system. It is located on the same embankment as the Amtrak tracks into Union Station. It serves the Red Line, and is situated between Union Station and Rhode Island Avenue–Brentwood stations. With an average of 6,593 daily entries in 2023, NoMa–Gallaudet U was the ninth-busiest station in the Metro system and the busiest elevated stop.

NoMa–Gallaudet U is located near the intersection of New York Avenue and Florida Avenue in Northeast Washington, D.C. The station is within the NoMa neighborhood, which is both residential and commercial, and the station itself is in a commercial district on Florida Avenue. The station opened under the name New York Ave–Florida Ave–Gallaudet U on November 20, 2004, as both the system's first infill station before Potomac Yard in 2023 and the first to be built with a mix of public and private funds. Additionally, a portion of the Metropolitan Branch Trail was completed as part of its construction.

== History ==
The station was not originally built with the rest of the Red Line; the segment of the Red Line containing the site of this station opened in 1976. By 1996, however, the idea of a Metro station at New York Avenue was being proposed as part of greater improvements of New York Avenue between Downtown Washington at the Maryland state line. In February 1999, the major property owners in the vicinity of the proposed station agreed in principle to contribute approximately $25 million in private financing for the project. The money would be collected from all commercial property owners within .5-mile (0.80 km) radius of the proposed station by being charged special tax assessments. With an estimated cost of $84 million to complete in October 2000, the federal government approved $25 million for its construction. The remaining costs would be split with $34 million coming from the District and $25 million coming from special tax assessments for the surrounding commercial properties. With funding secured, physical construction could commence.

The groundbreaking for the station occurred on December 16, 2000, with Mayor Anthony A. Williams and D.C.'s Congressional Delegate Eleanor Holmes Norton present for the festivities. In May 2002, Metro awarded a design–build contract to the joint venture of Lane Construction/Slattery/Skanska for the design and construction of the station. Since it was constructed along an existing line, its construction resulted in some delay for trains traveling on the Red Line during the construction of a double crossover switch. While still under construction in January 2004, the station name was changed from New York Ave to New York Ave–Florida Ave–Gallaudet U. The change was made to reflect its location near both Florida Avenue and Gallaudet University.

On November 20, 2004, the station opened as the 84th station, and first infill station, on the Metro system within four weeks prior to the opening of Morgan Boulevard and Largo stations. The final cost was $103.7 million with the federal government and private land owners each contributing $25 million and the D.C. government contributing $53.7 million. Its construction has catalyzed new development and redevelopment of the NoMa neighborhood. The station was renamed to NoMa–Gallaudet U on November 3, 2011, and formally christened with the new name on June 13, 2012.

=== Future improvements ===
There are plans to construct a pedestrian tunnel from the north entrance under the embankment to the east side of the tracks, and construction is scheduled to begin in 2028.

== Station layout ==
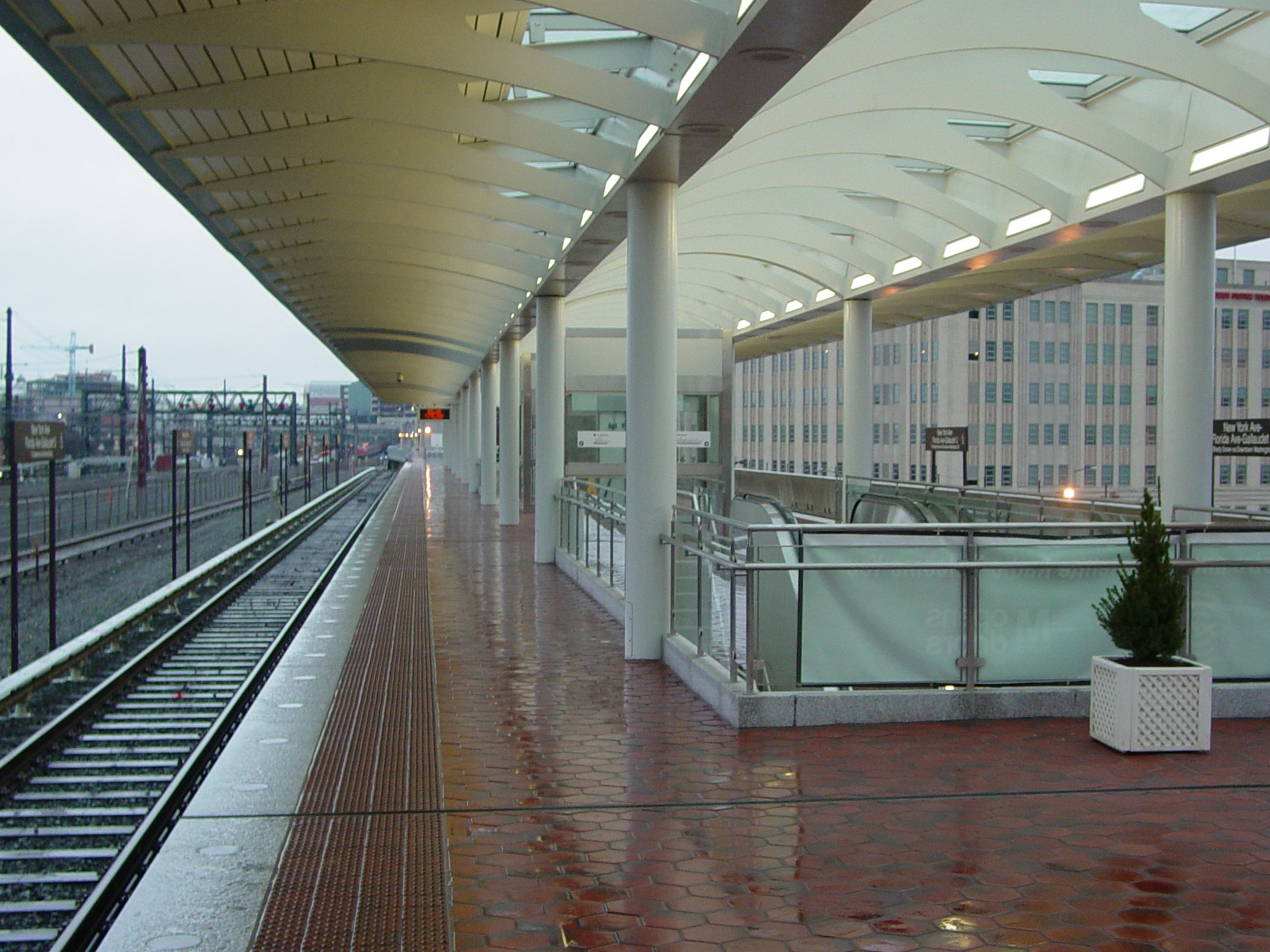
The station originally opened as New York Ave–Florida Ave–Gallaudet U in November 2004

NoMa–Gallaudet U is located near the intersection of New York Avenue and Florida Avenue in Northeast Washington. The station is within and named for the NoMa neighborhood, which is both residential and commercial. The station itself is in a commercial district on Florida Avenue. Its design differs from that of previous stations and is indicative of the lessons learned by Metro over its years of operation in several respects. Its canopy consists of white-painted, steel plate trusses and glass sheathing rather than concrete. Instead of having a single elevator as found at older stations, it contains two. This was done so if an elevator breaks down, service is provided to the station without having to offer shuttle service from another station.

South of the station, Shady Grove-bound trains go and remain underground until Grosvenor-Strathmore.

The station also provides ten racks and 28 lockers for bicycle users, carsharing with Zipcar and connections to several Metrobus routes.

== Public art ==
The station is notable for its artistic elements incorporated into its design as part of MetroArts, Metro's Art in Transit Program.

=== Journeys ===
Created by sculptor Barbara Grygutis, The 2nd Street entrance contains a 27-foot (8.2 m) tall aluminum sculpture of a leaf from a scarlet oak. On each side of the sculpture is a poem entitled "Journeys" composed by Dolores Kendrick, Washington's poet laureate. The poem reads: "Go slowly in taking the steps, and fast when counting stars." Grygutis also created the 500-foot (150 m) steel fence outside the station studded with glass leaves of various hues. Its design was inspired by Washington's dense tree canopy in addition to the scarlet oak being the official tree of the District.

== Notable places nearby ==
- McKinley Technology High School, a DCPS high school
- District of Columbia Public Schools central office
- Gallaudet University
- Union Market
- Bureau of Alcohol, Tobacco, Firearms and Explosives headquarters
- Equal Employment Opportunity Commission headquarters
