= Adelphi Mill =

Historic mill in Maryland, United States

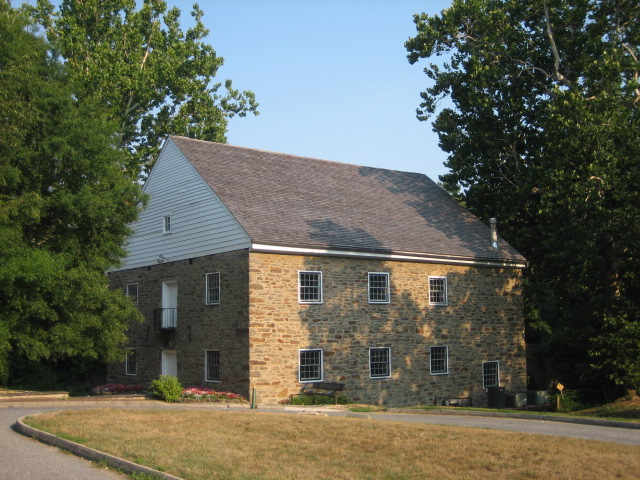
- Adelphi Mill in July 2007
- Interactive map of the Adelphi Mill area

General information
- Location: Adelphi, Maryland, United States of America
- Coordinates: 38°59′34″N 76°58′20″W
- Construction started: 1796
- Completed: Restored 1954
- Client: Issacher and Mahlon Schofield

Technical details
- Size: 34 acres (14 ha)

The Adelphi Mill is the only surviving historic mill in Prince George's County, Maryland. It is the oldest and largest mill in the Washington, D.C. area.

== History ==
The Adelphi Mill and Storehouse is located on the Northwest Branch of the Anacostia River at 8401 & 8402 Riggs Road in Adelphi, Maryland. It was built in 1796, and originally operated by two brothers, Issacher and Mahlon Schofield. It was given the name "Adelphi" after the original land patent title. The mill was used to both grind grain and card wool. In the early-19th century, ships came up the Northwest Branch to deliver raw goods and pickup finished materials. In the mid-19th century, the mill was part of the Green Hill estate of George Washington Riggs and renamed Riggs Mill. The mill was operated by the Freeman family until 1916. In the early 1920s, it became part of the Langley Park estate of Leander McCormick-Goodhart. In 1950, Mr. McCormick-Goodhart transferred the mill and surrounding 34 acres (140,000 m^{2}) to the Maryland-National Capital Park and Planning Commission (M-NCPPC). The mill was subsequently restored and reopened in 1954, as a community center with the old machinery and grinding wheels on display. It is also known as the Adelphi Mill Recreation Center, M-NCPPC. Also on this property is the small stone storehouse built into the slope on the opposite side of the road at 8401 Riggs Road."

== Gallery ==
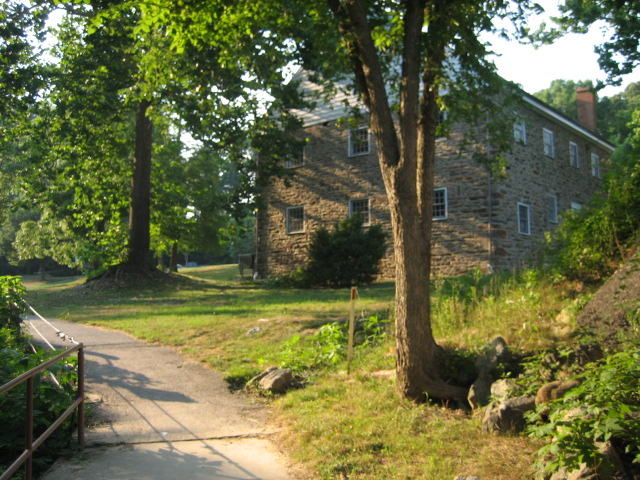
Adelphi Mill in July 2007

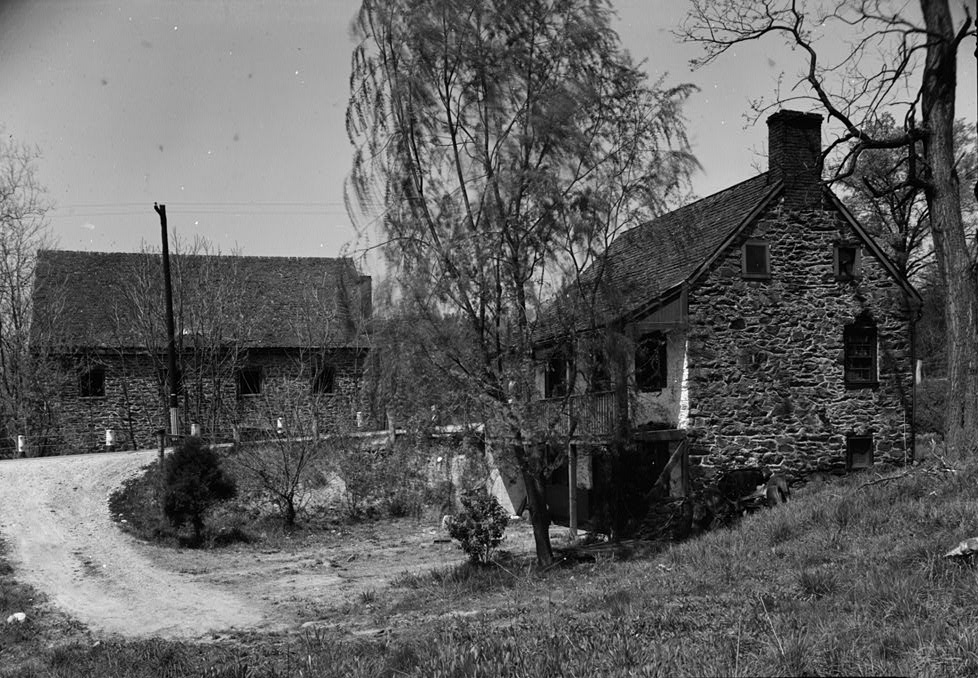
Adelphi Mill and Storehouse, 1936

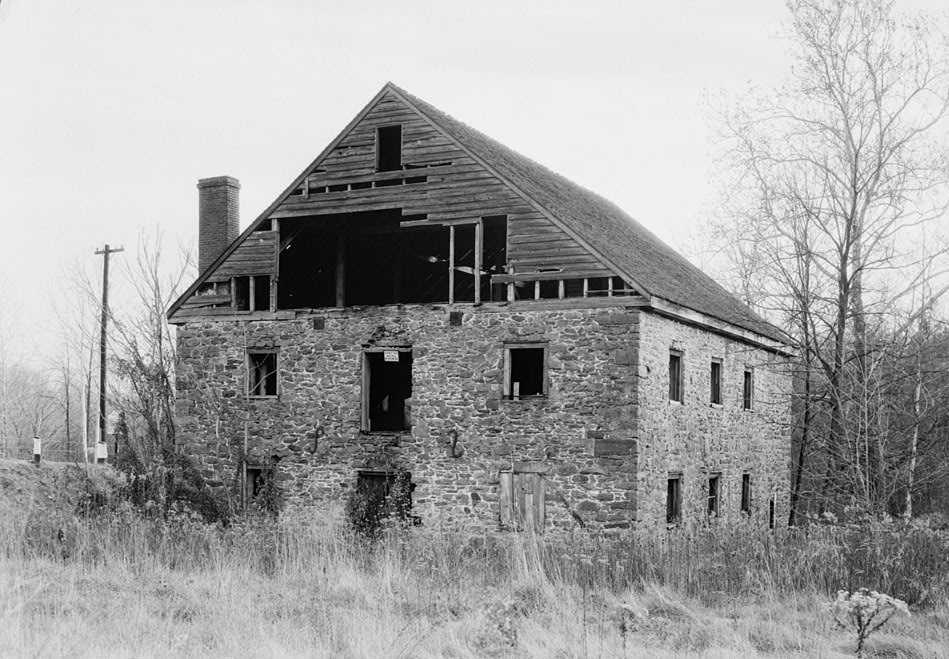
Adelphi Mill, 1934

== See also ==
- Northwest Branch Trail
