= Metropolitan Branch Trail =

American rail trail

Coordinates: 38°54′23.7″N 77°0′12.4″W

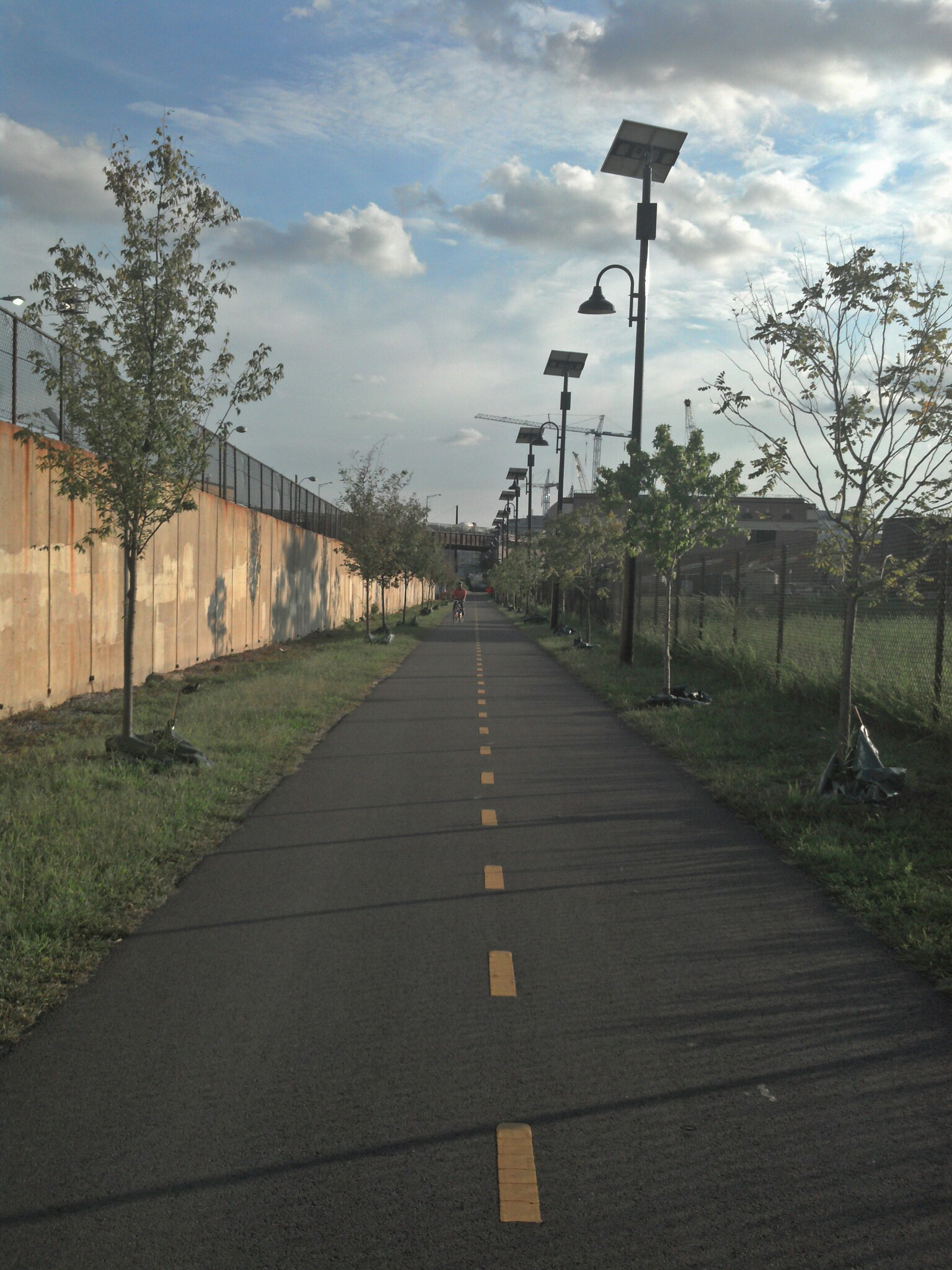
- The Metropolitan Branch Trail
- Length: 5.5 miles (8.9 km)
- Location: Washington, D.C.
- Trailheads: South: Union Station, North: Silver Spring
- Use: Hiking, Biking
- Website: DDOT Project Website

The Metropolitan Branch Trail (informally, the Met Branch Trail or MBT) is a partially-built American rail trail between the transit center in Silver Spring, Maryland, and Union Station in the District of Columbia. When completed, it will run for 8 miles (13 km): one in Maryland and seven in Washington, D.C. The trail parallels Metrorail and CSX tracks along a right-of-way opened in 1873 as the Baltimore and Ohio Railroad (B&O)'s Metropolitan Branch.

The trail is part of the East Coast Greenway. It is to connect to the Capital Crescent Trail when that trail is completed. A planned connection from Fort Totten to the Northwest Branch Trail of the Anacostia Tributary Trail System at Hyattsville, Maryland, is partially built.

== History ==
=== Conception and planning ===
The Metropolitan Branch Trail was conceived in 1988 by Patrick Hare of the Brookland neighborhood. Working with the Washington Area Bicyclist Association (WABA) and Rails-to-Trails Conservancy in 1989, Hare organized 11 cyclists to conduct an exploratory walk/ride. Soon after, motivated by CSX's plans to develop the Eckington Rail Yard needed for the trail, the Coalition for the Metropolitan Branch Trail was formed to explore and promote the potential for a multi-use trail. Before that, the proposed trail was sometimes called the "Dome to Dome Trail" because it would connect the Capitol Dome and the Catholic University dome. The Metropolitan Branch Trail entered the DC Comprehensive Plan in the early 1990s. As early as 1993, the National Park Service was planning to build the 0.75-mile section from the Fort Totten Metro Station to South Dakota Avenue; in 1997, the DC Department of Public Works (DPW) completed an engineering feasibility study that determined that it would be possible. In 1991, Congress gave the District $1.5 million to secure access, rights-of-way, easements, and title to land needed for the trail.

Planning of the trail began in 1998 after Congress allocated $8.5 million in demonstration-project funding to the District for the trail through the Transportation Equity Act for the 21st Century (TEA-21), the six-year federal transportation funding bill; this was celebrated with a groundbreaking ceremony. In 1999, WABA published a concept plan for the trail that envisioned a large urban park and greenway along the abandoned, and at the time undeveloped, CSX Transportation property. In April 2001, WABA published a study describing the necessary acquisitions for the trail. In 2002, when the city and the Washington Metropolitan Area Transit Authority (WMATA) agreed to construct a new Metro station at New York and Florida Avenues, trail advocates and city staff negotiated for WMATA to build a portion of the trail as a part of the project. Around the same time, the Maryland-National Capital Park and Planning Commission (M-NCPPC) completed a Feasibility Study and Concept Plan for one mile of the MBT between DC and Silver Spring. In 2003, the District Department of Transportation (DDOT) hired a special project manager for the trail, prepared a Takoma Alignment Study, and began development of the comprehensive concept plan, which was completed in 2005.

=== District of Columbia ===
Amid this planning, work was underway in the District. After a groundbreaking ceremony on May 29, 1998, the District Department of Transportation built a nearly one-mile segment along John McCormack Road near Catholic University as part of routine road maintenance. It was built with $1.9 million of federal Congestion Mitigation and Air Quality (CMAQ) funding and was completed in November 1998. On October 21, 1999, the trail was named one of 50 Millennium Legacy Trails at a White House ceremony featuring First Lady Hillary Rodham Clinton and Secretary of Transportation Rodney Slater. Five days later, a formal ribbon-cutting ceremony was held at the Brookland-Catholic University Metro station to celebrate its designation as a Millennium Legacy Trail. It was attended by Slater; eight members of Congress; and representatives of NHTSA, FHWA, and the DC government. Another short, on-road trail section was built along First Street NE from Massachusetts Avenue to K Street NE in 2000. When the New York Ave–Florida Ave–Gallaudet University Metro station opened in November 2004, it included about 2,000 feet (610 m) of trail on a raised structure, but that section would remain inaccessible until 2010. Stairs from the New York Avenue Metro Station section to L Street NE, a trail under the tracks along L Street NE and a one-block portion along 2nd Street NE were completed in the spring of 2008.

Construction on the core of the trail, a 1.5-mile segment from New York Avenue to Franklin Street, began in June 2009; its opening in May 2010 made the whole DC section usable.

In early 2015, the 100 Florida Avenue building opened with a connection between the trail and Florida and New York Avenues. The connection to the trail and to Florida Avenue was closed in 2019 to allow the construction of 200 Florida Avenue. That opened, with a new temporary ramp, in December 2021. But that ramp wouldn't even last a year, as in August 2021 it was closed to allow for construction of 202 Florida Avenue. The building, which includes a "bike lobby" with a staircase down to Florida Avenue and a connection to New York Avenue opened in 2024.

On July 9, 2013, a 500-foot section between Monroe Street and the CUA Metro station opened as part of the Monroe Street Market development. On May 30, 2014, a roughly 2,000-foot section of the trail opened as a curb-protected, two-way bike lane along 1st Street NE from G Street NE to M Street NE. This was connected to the existing trail in November 2014 by a 572-foot protected bike lane on M Street, and then extended 812 feet south along 1st Street from G Street NE to the stub at Columbus Circle NE on August 12, 2015. The Rhode Island Avenue Pedestrian Bridge over the rail line, which connects the trail on the west side to the Rhode Island Avenue Metro Station on the east, opened on December 31, 2014, after more than 15 months of work.

On October 31, 2017, DDOT issued a Notice to Proceed for the design-build construction of the next phase of the Metropolitan Branch Trail: the "Fort Totten section" from John McCormack Drive in Brookland to the Fort Totten Metro Station. That work was to be completed in 2020, but was delayed by contractor problems and the COVID-19 pandemic. The first completed section was an 800-foot replacement of the connector between Gallatin St NE and 1st Place NE; it re-opened on June 17, 2020. The section from the connector to the existing trail on John McCormack opened on April 23, 2022.

On December 7, 2019, the section between Q and R Streets NE, closed since August 2019, reopened as part of construction of Alethia Tanner Park. The trail in that block had always hugged the outside of the parcel, but the new design allowed it to cut across the parcel, removing two sharp turns. On March 18, 2020, NoMa Parks Foundation completed a Henry Thomas Way Drive connector as part of the same project. The park itself opened on June 25.

From April to June 2021, DC built a 450-foot section of the trail along Eastern Avenue from the Maryland boundary, where it connected to an existing section built by Montgomery County, to Piney Branch Road.

DDOT began work on the last major section in the District, from Fort Totten to Takoma, in summer 2023. The section was built in three parts: Fort Totten Metro Station parking area to South Dakota Ave NE, completed in fall 2024; onward to Blair Road NW, built between late 2023 and fall 2024; and along Blair from Oglethorpe St NW to Aspen St NW, built from spring 2024 to fall 2025. A ribbon-cutting ceremony for the section was held on November 12, 2025.

In 2027, DDOT plans to start work on the Piney Branch to Blair section: a mix of bike lanes, trails, a woonerf and neighborhood parkways.

DC has long planned to add a ramp from the south end of the trail to street level at L Street as part of improvements to the NoMa–Gallaudet U Metro station. As of March 2023, the ramp was part of the project's planned Phases II-IV.

=== Montgomery County ===
Work was also going on in Maryland, where the trail will terminate at the Silver Spring Metro Center.

In 2001, the Montgomery County Planning Board approved a CCT/MetBranch Trail Facility Plan, but formal planning for the trail was completed only in 2017. Nonetheless, some work was completed as part of other projects. In 2003, Montgomery College built a half-mile of mostly-paved trail from the District line along Fenton Street to its Takoma campus expansion. The campus expansion also included a bridge from the Takoma Park section over the railroad tracks to Jessup Blair Park in Silver Spring that opened on July 28, 2004. The half-mile of trail had included a short section topped with water-permeable stone dust to protect nearby tree roots, but after further evaluation indicated the trees would be unaffected, this section was paved in January 2006.

Sections built as part of larger projects include a 100-foot section of a trail south of Ripley Street that was part of Solaire's 1150 Ripley building in 2012, a section from Colesville Road to Ripley Street in Silver Spring that opened in January and February 2013 as part of the Silver Spring Transit Center, and a 0.05-mile section of the trail alongside the Progress Place development that was completed in late 2016, but will not be opened to the public until the county finishes its trail construction work. The first piece built by Montgomery County not as part of some other project was a two-block section along Fenton and King Streets that was completed in June 2018.

In 2022, another small section was completed from the stub behind Solaire's 1150 Ripley building, behind Solaire's 8200 Dixon building to the Progress Place section. This included a new connection to Dixon Avenue, but was not opened to the Progress Place section next door.

In March 2024, Montgomery County started work on Phase 2A of the project in Silver Spring, which would close the remaining gaps between Dixon Avenue and Georgia Avenue (primarily around the train station) and build a new trail bridge over Georgia Avenue. Work is expected to be complete in fall 2025.

As of September 2024, officials had announced no start or completion day for Phase 2B, the section along the west side of Selim Road to a new tunnel under Burlington Avenue to King Street. Phase 2B and 2A were originally to be done together, but in 2022 all bids on the project were rejected and the project broken into two parts.

=== Right-of-way ===
A substantial segment of the original Metropolitan Branch right-of-way south of Franklin Street NE (in some places, 200 feet wide) was marked as an extension of Delaware Avenue under the L'Enfant Plan. In the late 19th and early 20th century, it was converted into railroad sidings for industrial use on Capitol Hill, parallel to the B&O railroad. These Metropolitan Branch sidings became disused as industries left the city, and the owner, CSX, which had already sold the active B&O railroad tracks within the District to the Washington Metro under a joint-use agreement, made plans to redevelop many of the properties along the right-of-way. The sidings land was left vacant as a staging ground for temporary construction uses. During this period, the wide, grassy strip became a popular short-cut for pedestrians and cyclists trying to access the Red Line, which runs along the corridor.

Initially, WMATA engineered the Red Line to accommodate existing railroad uses in the corridor, bisecting the existing rail line and preserving many of the Metropolitan Branch sidings. In 1988, a decade after WMATA purchased and widened the active tracks, Montgomery County purchased the Georgetown Branch of the B&O, a single-track spur feeding into the Metropolitan Branch from the north, for transportation use including an extension of the Capital Crescent Trail. The remaining disused portions of the Metropolitan Branch spanned the distance parallel to the Red Line between the Georgetown Branch and Union Station, including sizable gaps north of Franklin Street, where the railroad had been widened by WMATA; the only available right-of-way for a trail in these areas was on adjacent parkland, or streets parallel to the railroad tracks.

Cost-cutting efforts led planners to alter the planned Metropolitan Branch Trail route, running substantial portions on streets to reduce the amount of land needed to be acquired. Still, a continuous off-street trail is planned between Franklin Street and the New York Ave–Florida Ave–Gallaudet University Metro station.

The connector trail between the Metropolitan Branch Trail and the Anacostia Tributary Trail System is envisioned as following the linear park under which Metro's Green Line was built and a route that had already been proposed as part of the Fort Circle Trail.

=== Connections ===
The Met Branch Trail connects at Eastern Avenue in DC to the Prince George's County Connector Trail, whose first section, to Russell Avenue in Maryland, was built in 2009 and 2010.

== See also ==
- B&O Metropolitan Branch
