= Northwest Branch Trail =

Hiking trail in Maryland

Coordinates: 38°56′44″N 76°56′31″W

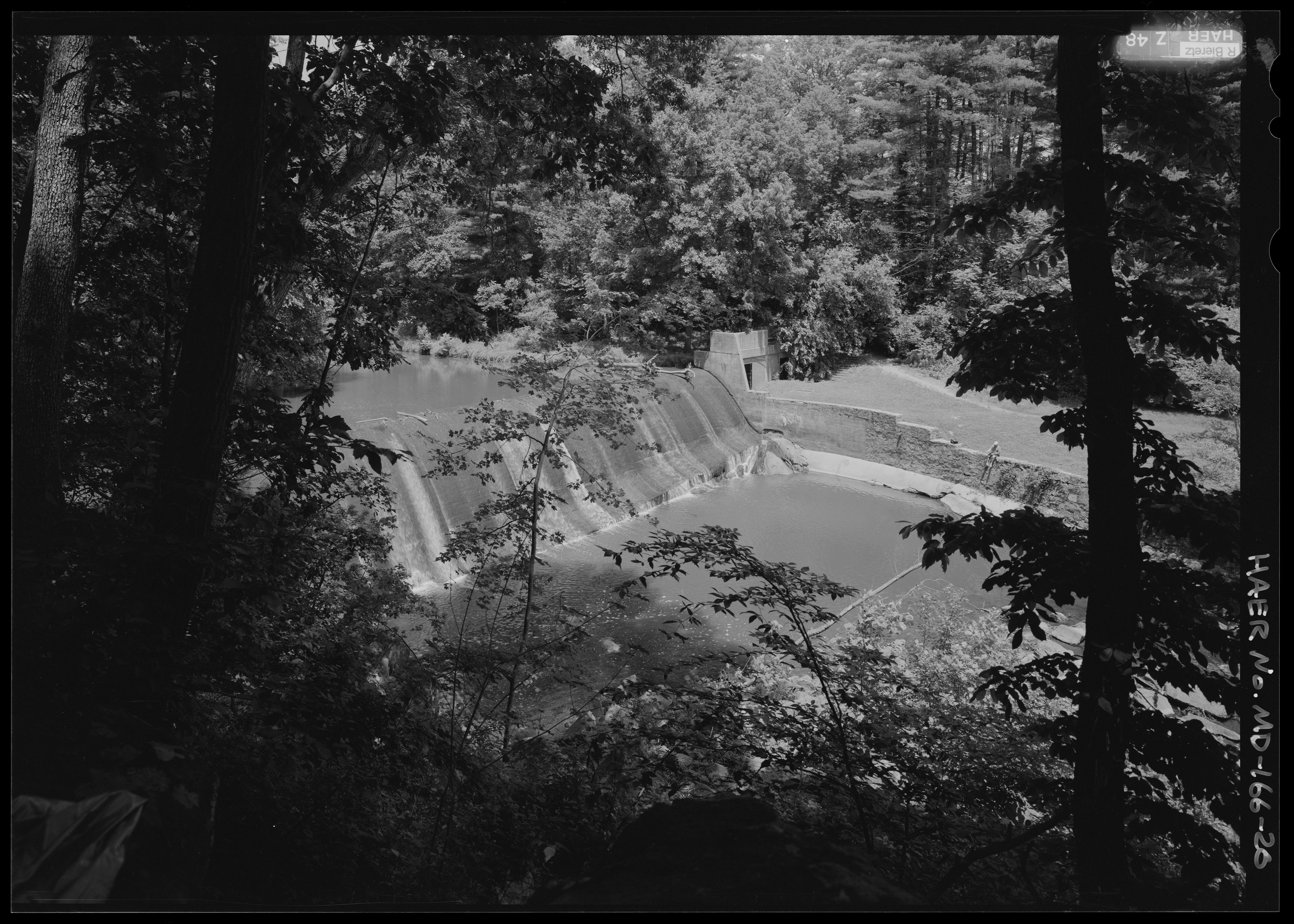
- Burnt Mills Dam from the Northwest Branch Trail
- Length: 21 miles (34 km)
- Location: Montgomery and Prince George's County, Maryland, US
- Use: Hiking, Biking, equestrianism

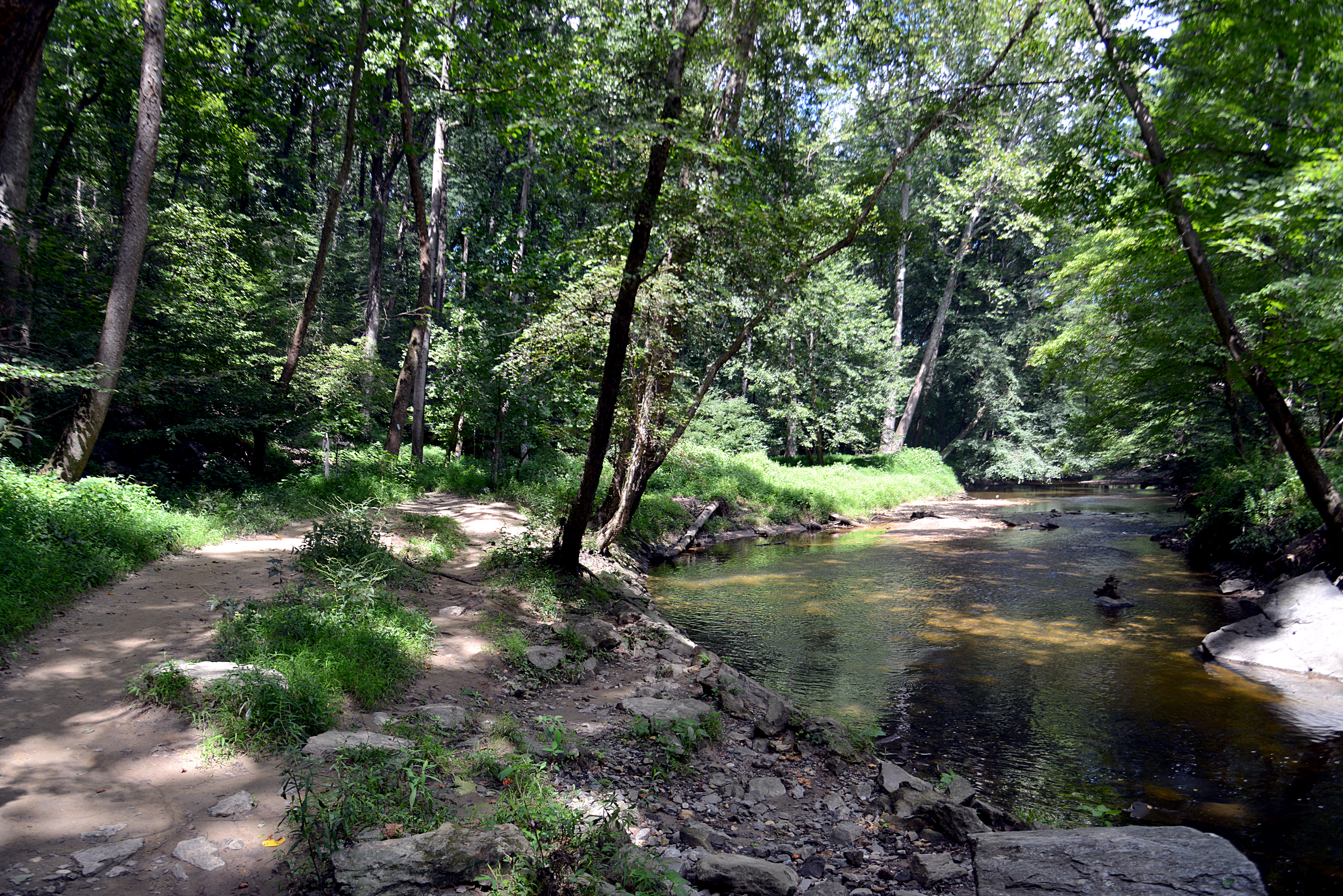
Northwest Branch trail

The Northwest Branch Trail is a 21-mile (34 km) multi-use (hiking, biking, equestrian) trail that follows the Northwest Branch of the Anacostia River in the Maryland suburbs of Washington DC. It is part of the Rachel Carson Greenway and the Anacostia Tributary Trail System. It runs between the Layhill neighborhood of Silver Spring and Bladensburg in Montgomery and Prince George's County, Maryland, USA.

== Background ==
The trail starts in Bladensburg, Prince George's County, Maryland, and runs north following the Northwest Branch of the Anacostia River, ending in the Layhill neighborhood of Montgomery County, Maryland. It connects with a number of other trails including the Sligo Creek Trail in Carole Highlands.

The lower third of the trail, which is paved, runs 6 miles (9.7 km) from Bladensburg to the Prince George's-Montgomery county line in Adelphi near New Hampshire Avenue and Piney Branch Road, then continues approximately 1.26 miles into Montgomery County. The paved trail then terminates around trail mile 7.26, at the southern terminus of the Rachel Carson Greenway and the Capital Beltway. Once the trail crosses the county line it runs to the Burnt Mills Dam. The dam is the site of the former Camp Woodrow Wilson, the two Georgian Revival pump houses of the Robert B. Morse Filtration Plant, and is now the Burnt Mills Dam parks (East and West).

From the dam the trail proceeds north to Wheaton Regional Park. Between the Burnt Mills Dam trailhead on Colesville Road and Kemp Mill Road near Wheaton Regional Park the trail runs along the west side of the Northwest Branch creek. This is a natural multi-use surface trail. On the east side of the creek is the Rachel Carson Greenway trail, a hiker-only trail.

Theodore Roosevelt considered the portion of the trail 0.5 miles (0.80 km) south of the Burnt Mills Dam parks one of his favorite places. The rocky area known as the "Torrent and Gorge", section is the geological fall line between the Piedmont and Atlantic coastal plain regions, which forms a small waterfall.

Mother and I had a most lovely ride the other day, way up beyond Sligo Creek to what is called North-west Branch, at Burnt Mills, where is a beautiful gorge, deep and narrow, with great boulders and even cliffs. Excepting Great Falls it is the most beautiful place around here. Mother scrambled among the cliffs in her riding habit, very pretty and most interesting. The roads were good and some of the scenery really beautiful. We were gone four hours, half an hour being occupied scrambling in the gorge.

— Theodore Roosevelt, June 21, 1904

The Northwest Branch Trail Corridor was officially renamed as the Rachel Carson Greenway in 2004.
