= Sligo Creek =

Stream in Maryland, United States of America

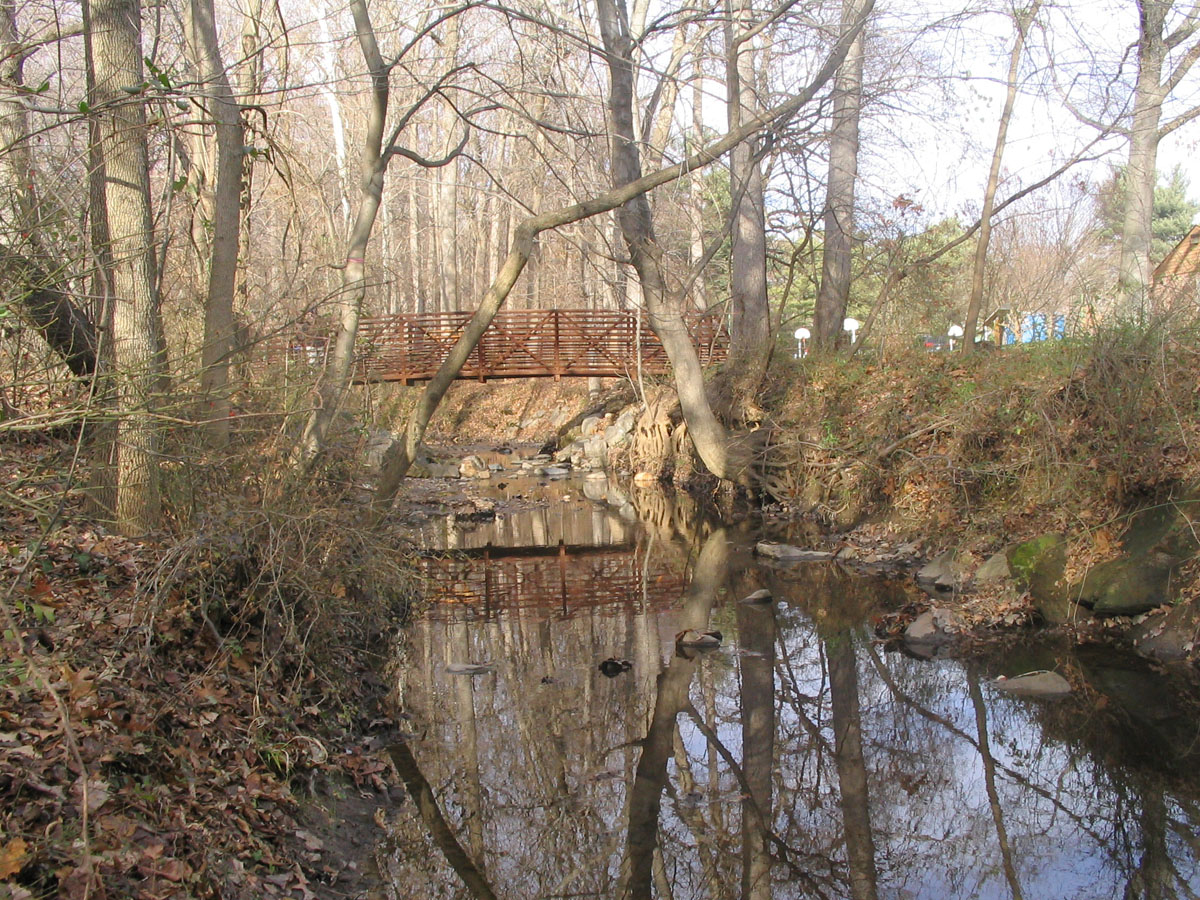
- The creek running through Silver Spring, Maryland

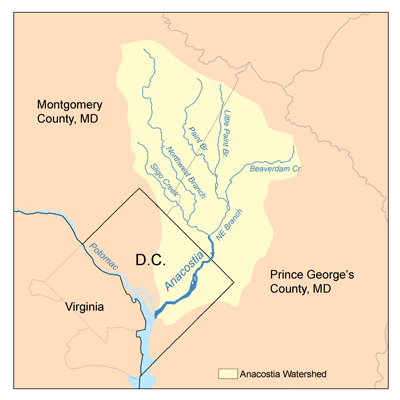
- Map of the Anacostia River watershed showing Sligo Creek

Location
- Country: United States
- State: Maryland
- City: Silver Spring, Maryland

Physical characteristics
- Source
  - location: Kemp Mill, Maryland
  - elevation: 450 ft (140 m)
- Mouth: Northwest Branch
  - location: Hyattsville, Maryland
  - coordinates: 38.959°N 76.974°W
  - elevation: 35 ft (11 m)
- Length: 9.1 mi (14.6 km)
- Basin size: 11.6 sq mi (30 km^{2})
- Discharge
  - location: Takoma Park
  - average: 26 cu ft/s (0.74 m^{3}/s)
  - minimum: 3.3 cu ft/s (0.093 m^{3}/s)
  - maximum: 49 cu ft/s (1.4 m^{3}/s)

Basin features
- Tributaries
  - left: Long Branch
  - right: Wheaton Br, Comstock Br, Takoma Park Br

Sligo Creek is a free-flowing tributary of the Northwest Branch of the Anacostia River in Maryland. (The Anacostia, in turn, feeds into the Potomac River and eventually empties into the Atlantic Ocean via the Chesapeake Bay.) The creek is approximately 9.1 miles (14.6 km) long, with a drainage area of about 11.6 square miles (30 km^{2}).

== Geography ==
The creek rises in the Kemp Mill section of Silver Spring in Montgomery County and joins with Northwest Branch near the city of Hyattsville in Prince George's County. The lower portion of the creek has been channelized. Elevations in the subwatershed range from 450 feet (137 m) above sea level to 35 feet (11 m) at the confluence with Northwest Branch; the average gradient for the course of the creek is 0.72%.

Contributing streams that flow into the creek include Wheaton Branch, Comstock Branch, Takoma Park Branch, and Long Branch.

Sligo Creek is one of the most heavily urbanized subwatersheds in the Anacostia watershed, with a population density of 7,081 people per mi^{2}. 75% of the watershed is in Montgomery County, 20% is in Prince George's County, and 5% is in the District of Columbia. Less than 15% of the subwatershed is undeveloped, and only 10% is forested. Less than 0.01% of the area is wetlands.

From its source to the confluence with the Northwest Branch, the creek crosses through the communities of Silver Spring, Wheaton, Takoma Park, Carole Highlands, Chillum and Hyattsville. In these towns, the banks of the creek are in many stretches maintained as public parkland, with grassy lawns and playing fields.

The Sligo Creek Trail, a hiker-biker trail, runs along the creek from Wheaton to the confluence, where it connects with the Anacostia Tributary Trail System. An automobile parkway runs along many parts of the creek in Montgomery County.

== Pollution and stream restoration ==
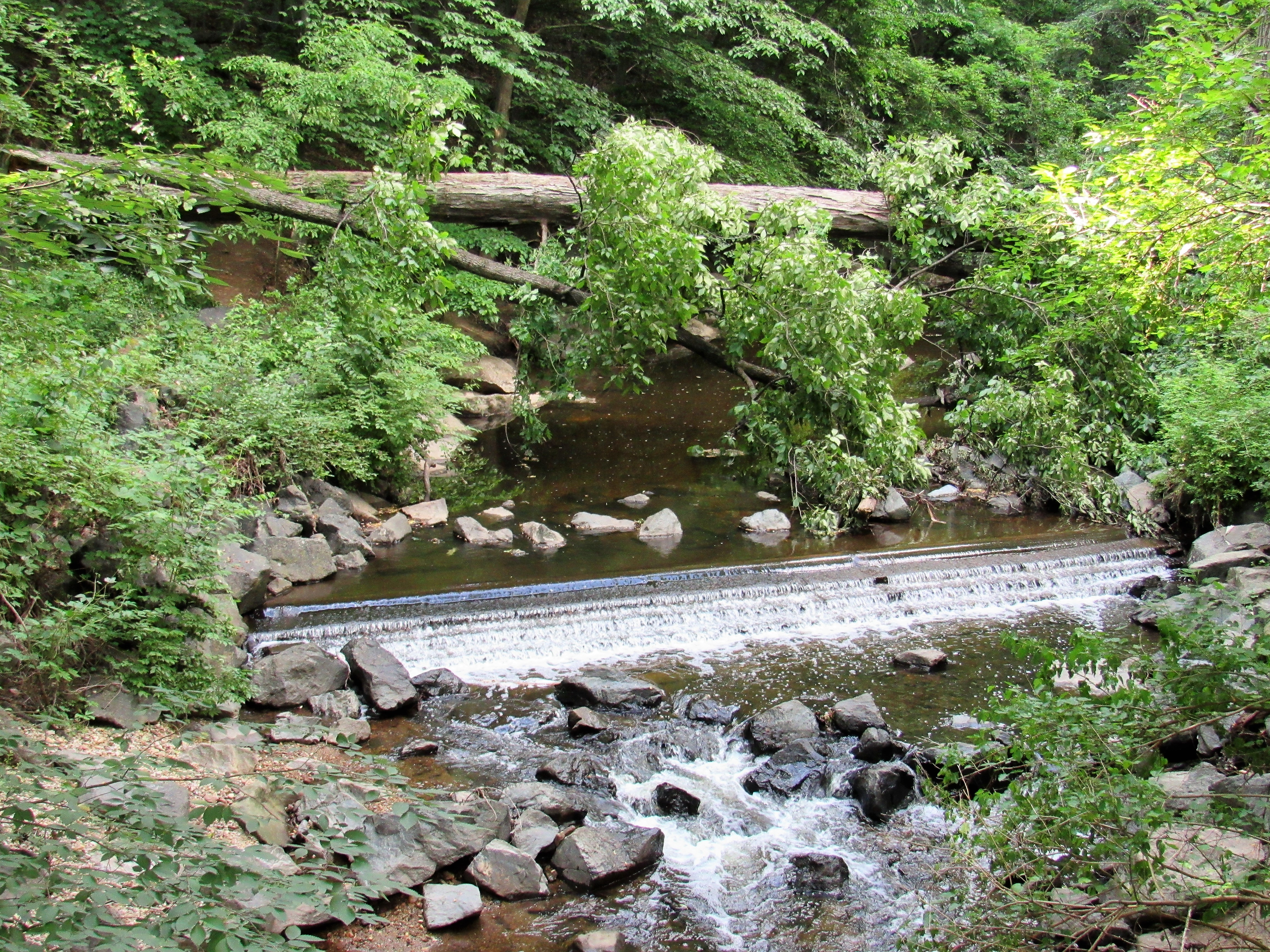
A small dam on Sligo Creek

The Sligo Creek watershed is a highly urbanized area, and as a result the water quality in the creek and tributaries is degraded. In 2002 the Maryland Department of the Environment (MDE) classified the creek as having poor water quality. The Montgomery County Government began installing several stormwater management and stream restoration projects in the watershed in 1989, and by 2009 MDE had recognized some improvements in stream quality. Additional county projects are ongoing as of 2018.

== Ecology ==
Several species of native anadromous fish spawn in the Sligo Creek watershed, including alewife (Alosa pseudoharengus), blueback herring (Alosa aestivalis), and white perch (Morone americana). According to the Friends of Sligo Creek, other species of fish found in Sligo Creek include the American eel, Bluegill, Rosyside dace, Longnose dace, goldfish, creek chub, white sucker, tessellated darter, golden shiner, Eastern blacknose dace, and green sunfish.

Non-native introduced species living in Sligo Creek include Faxonius virilis, the virile crayfish. Virile crayfish have been found in Sligo Creek since at least 1997, and are considered invasive.

== History ==
Sligo Creek was named after the crossroads named "Sligo" founded in the mid 19th century by Irish immigrant workers on the C&O Canal. It may have been named after County Sligo in Ireland. The crossroads was located at Colesville Road and the 7th Street Pike, currently the corner of Colesville Road and Georgia Avenue in Silver Spring. At the time of the Civil War, Sligo had a toll gate on the 7th Street Pike, an inn and a post office. A half mile from the Sligo crossroads Colesville Road crosses Sligo Creek. The 1878 Hopkin's atlas of the area around Washington, labels the southern portion of the creek as "Sligers Bra[nch]" (although "Sligo Branch" is used on the atlas' map for Montgomery County).

Over the years, Sligo Creek has served many purposes for area residents, including powering grist mills and as a drinking water source. In the Takoma Park section of the creek (near Washington Adventist University), the remains of a dam and associated building foundations for the Sligo Creek Waterworks can still be seen. From 1900 to 1930, the waterworks, the earliest public water system in the area, served the city of Takoma Park. The water system was sold to the Washington Suburban Sanitary Commission in 1919, which abandoned the facility in 1930.

Another dam, located where Flower Avenue crosses Sligo Creek, served Sligo Mill which was located where the current New Hampshire Avenue crosses Sligo Creek. Sligo Mill was built in 1812 by investors that included several members of the prominent Maryland Carroll family. In addition to milling grain for local farmers, Sligo Mill distilled whiskey. The mill was demolished in the 1920s.

Overlooking the dam and millpond for Sligo Mill on the right bank of Sligo Creek, the Glen Sligo Hotel and Wildwood Amusement Park were built in 1900. The hotel and amusement park ceased operations in 1903.

Sligo Creek served as the inspiration and title for "Sligo River Blues", a song by Takoma Park guitarist John Fahey, who popularized the area amongst folk artists. It also inspired "Sligo Creek," an Irish traditional reel composed by an American banjo, mandolin, fiddle and guitar player Danny Noveck, who lived near the creek at the time he composed the melody. Another prominent folk guitarist, Al Petteway, composed "Sligo Creek" while living in the Takoma Park area. This Scots-influenced guitar tune was later featured as the theme song of The National Parks, a PBS miniseries directed by Ken Burns.

The creek, where her son and his friends played as children, was part of the inspiration for Katherine Paterson's Newbery Medal award-winning book Bridge to Terabithia.

== See also ==
- List of Maryland rivers
