= Anacostia Trails Heritage Area =

Heritage area site in Prince George's County, Maryland

Anacostia Trails Heritage Area is one of the thirteen heritage area sites certified by the state of Maryland and is located in Northern Prince George's County, Maryland. It is administered by the Maryland Historical Trust through the Maryland Heritage Areas Program.

== History ==
The Anacostia Trails Heritage Area covers over 100 square miles of Northern Prince George's County and includes hiking trails and bike trails. The Heritage Area is surrounded to the south by Montgomery County, to the west by Howard and Anne Arundel Counties, to the north by Washington, D.C., and to the east by the towns of Bowie, Glenn Dale, and Cheverly.

The Redevelopment Authority of Prince George's County handed over complete management of the Heritage Area to Anacostia Trails Heritage Area, Inc., a non-profit organization currently headed by Meagan Baco. The group bases its operations on the Approved Anacostia Trails Heritage Area Management Plan, created in September 2001 by the Prince George's County Planning Department and the Maryland-National Capital Park and Planning Commission.

Anacostia Trails Heritage Area launched the Maryland Milestones tourism brand in 2012 to promote the region's historic firsts and distinctive moments. The Maryland Milestones initiative educates the general public and links the area's history, culture, and natural surroundings. Additionally, the Maryland Milestones brand's stated intent is to highlight the role that transportation has played in trade, communication, and tourism in the area. The program's specific activities include maintaining the Annelie & Soren Ebbeler Maryland Milestones Heritage Center in Hyattsville, Maryland, hosting educational and recreational events, researching and updating interpretive signs and wayfinding, enhancing and promoting multi-modal trails, and more.
