= Indian Spring =

- Neighborhood
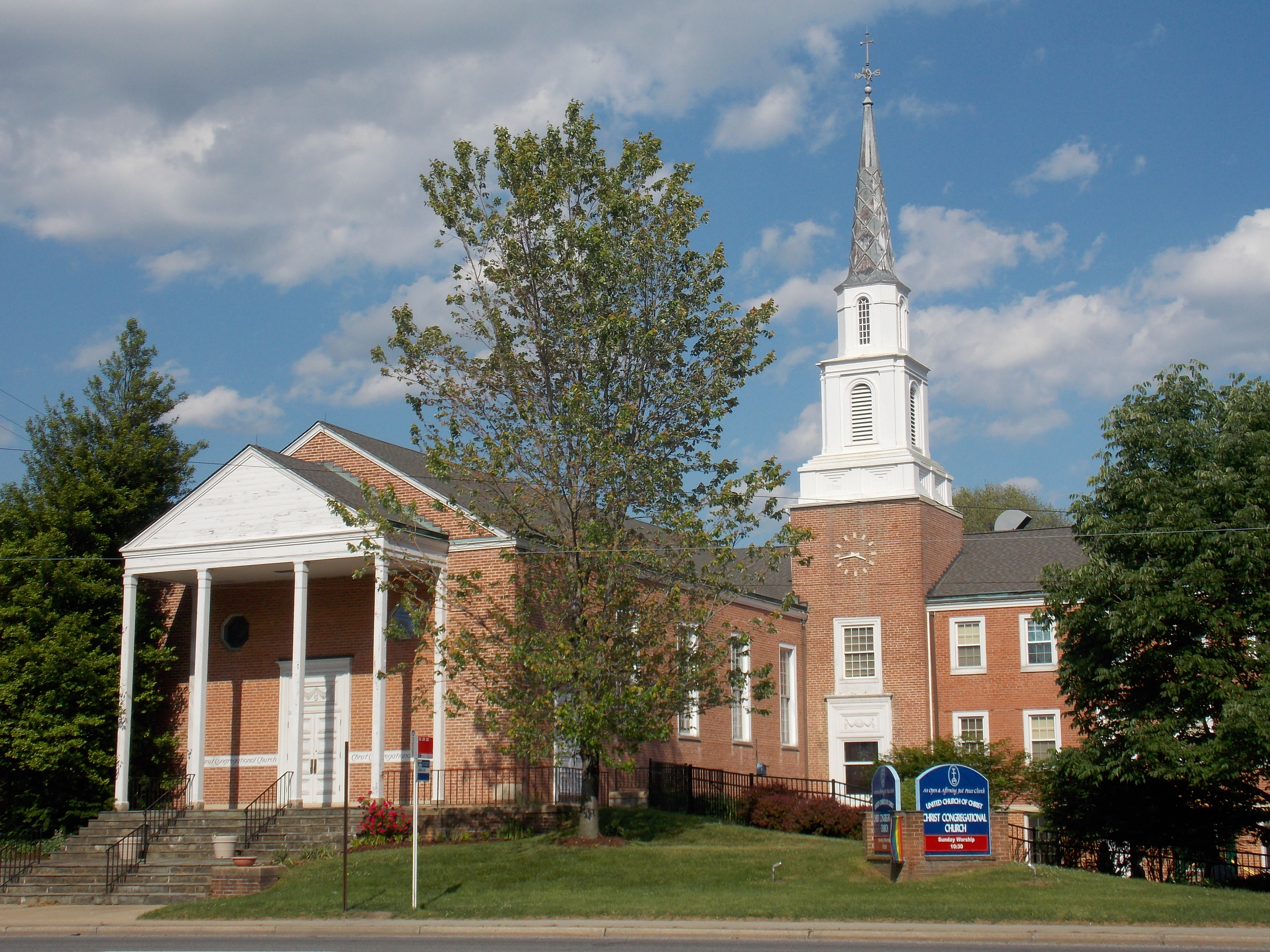
- Indian Spring neighborhood

- Location in Maryland
- Coordinates: 39°00′45″N 77°00′45″W
- Country: United States
- State: Maryland
- County: Montgomery
- Unincorporated community: Silver Spring
- ZIP Code: 20901
- Area codes: 301, 240

Indian Spring (also known as Indian Spring Terrace) is a mostly residential neighborhood of Silver Spring, Maryland. Located within the Silver Spring CDP, it is sometimes considered a southeastern neighborhood of Four Corners. It is one of the oldest established neighborhoods in Silver Spring.

== Location ==
Indian Spring is located in the northern portion of the Silver Spring census-designated place. Indian Spring is bounded by the Capital Beltway to the north. North of the Beltway is Montgomery Blair High School and the neighborhood of Four Corners / Woodmoor. To the east, across University Boulevard, is the neighborhood of Franklin Knolls. The North Sligo Hills Park neighborhood lies to the west across Colesville Road. To the south, Indian Spring is bounded by Franklin Avenue, below which lies the Seven Oaks-Evanswood neighborhood as well as Downtown Silver Spring.

== History ==
Prior to the arrival of European settlers, the land that Indian Spring was built on was inhabited by the Piscataway people. The earliest known usage of the name "Indian Spring" can be traced to a 1871 property deed that George N. Beale (1829-1912) and his wife sold. The land that was sold was adjacent to "Beale's Indian Spring farm", which had been established in the 1850s.

In 1921, a group of Silver Spring businessmen purchased the land and formed the Silver Spring Golf Club. It later became known as the Indian Spring Gold Club. During this time, the golf club promoted the legend concerning the Indigenous spring and created an appropriated image of an Indigenous person drinking from the spring in order to market the golf club and later the Indian Spring housing development. Membership in the Indian Spring Golf Club was restricted to white Christians, as Jews and African-Americans were not allowed to be members. In 1939 or 1940, the golf club was bought by Abraham S. Kay, a white Jewish real estate developer. Kay eliminated half of the golf club in order to build most of the homes in the Indian Spring neighborhood. Kay opened membership to white Jews, who were subjected to antisemitic restrictions elsewhere in Silver Spring. Membership in the golf club soon became all or almost exclusively Jewish; however, Black people and other people of color were still excluded from membership. Like others before him, Kay also used racist imagery of Indigenous people in advertising sales of homes. Kay's development promoted Jim Crow-era segregation by banning Black, Indigenous, and other people of color from buying homes. Racially restrictive covenants prevented African-Americans and other people of color from owning a home or living in a home in Indian Spring, unless they were domiciled as a domestic servant. Racial covenants were prohibited in law by the Fair Housing Act of 1968, but racial covenants remain in many Indian Spring homes. The Indian Spring Golf Club was moved to a new location on Layhill Road in Glenmont in 1954, because the proposed Capital Beltway was a danger to the continued existence of the club. During the 1940s and 1950s, Indian Spring became a center of the Jewish community in Silver Spring. Many Jewish residents attended the nearby Temple Israel synagogue on University Boulevard, which has since merged into Tikvat Israel of Rockville.

A 1930 covenant from Indian Spring Park, Section 1, excludes Black Americans. The covenant reads: "...that she or her heirs or assigns will never sell, rent, lease, transfer or convey any part of the land herein conveyed to any negro or colored person."

Abraham Kay donated land to create the Silver Spring YMCA located on Hastings Drive. The northern part of the Indian Spring Golf Club is now the location of Montgomery Blair High School.

== Name ==
The term "Indian Spring" refers to local myths about a spring that was believed to be the "largest and finest spring in Maryland". According to The Washington Herald, "Tradition says that Indians from all of the Eastern part of the country came to partake of its waters and be healed of their infirmities". The stories about the spring have been criticized by the Indian Spring Civic Association as "racist" and a "myth" that "invokes the problematic trope of “magical Indians” who supposedly used a nearby spring with mystical healing properties." Due to the racist history surrounding the name, as of January 2020, the Indian Spring Civic Association has been debating renaming the neighborhood. While some residents do not consider the name offensive or do not support a name change, many residents consider the name problematic or racist. Some South Asian residents also have objections to the use of the term "Indian". The civic association has reached out and consulted with multiple Indigenous organizations in Maryland, including bands of the state-recognized Piscataway-Conoy Tribe of Maryland. Natalie Proctor, the Tribal Chair of the Cedarville Band of the Piscataway, has stated that the name does not honor or properly acknowledge the Piscataway people. Chief Billy Redwing Tayac, Hereditary Chief of the Piscataway People, does not consider "Indian" to be a slur, but supported renaming the Washington Commanders because he acknowledges other Indigenous people do consider it a slur.

== Transportation ==
Indian Spring is serviced by Metrobus numbers M42, M52, and M54, as well as by Ride On numbers 9, 14, 21, and 22. The Flash BRT bus has a stop in nearby Four Corners. Washington Metro service is available on the Red Line in nearby Downtown Silver Spring, Wheaton, and Takoma. By 2027, Purple Line service will be available at the nearby Silver Spring, Piney Branch Road and Long Branch stations.
