= Franklin Knolls (Silver Spring, Maryland) =

- Neighborhood
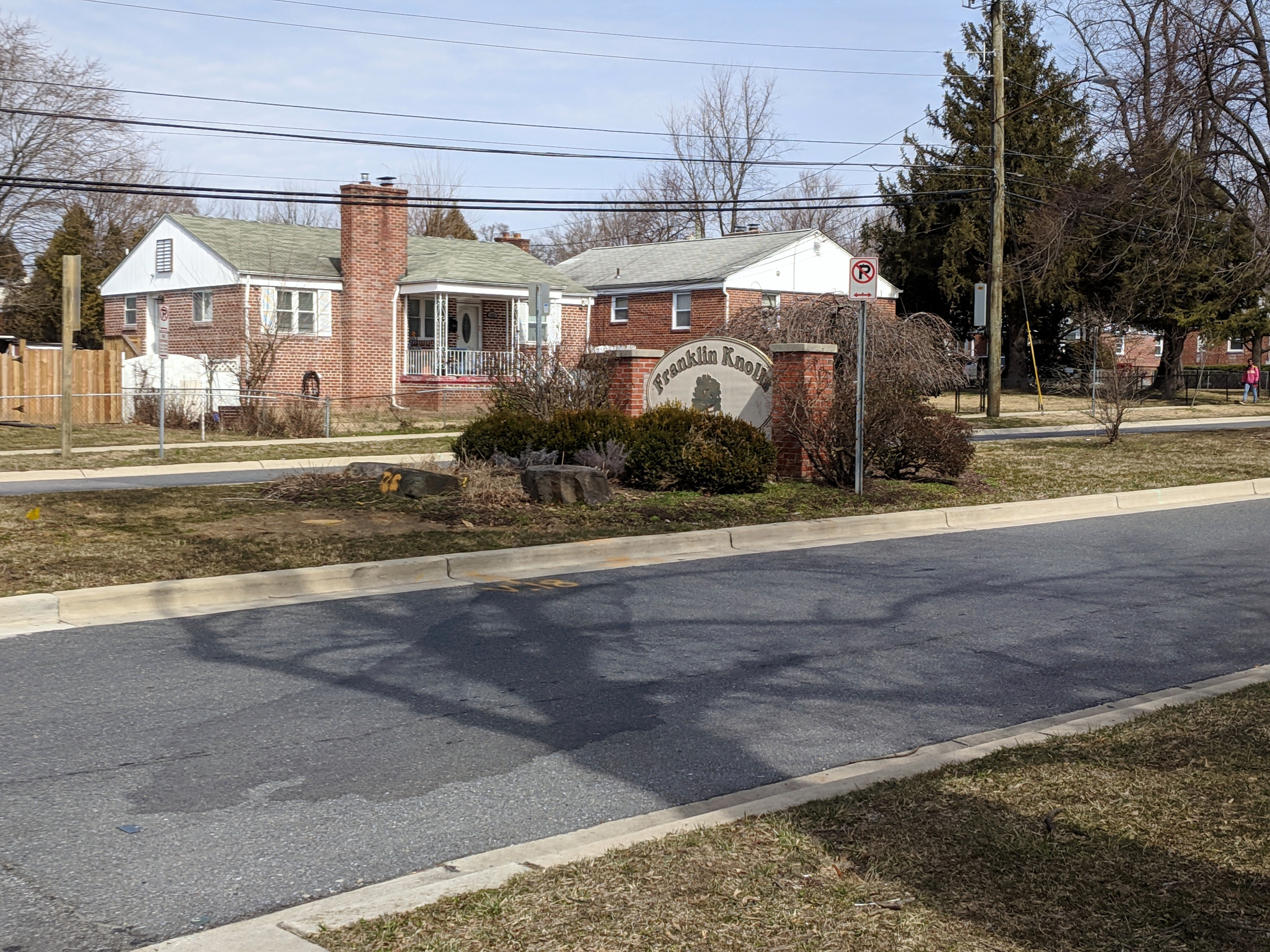
- Franklin Knolls neighborhood

- Location in Maryland
- Coordinates: 39°00′53″N 76°59′52″W
- Country: United States
- State: Maryland
- County: Montgomery
- Unincorporated community: Silver Spring
- ZIP Code: 20901
- Area codes: 301, 240
- GNIS feature ID: 590246

Franklin Knolls is a residential neighborhood located in Silver Spring, a census-designated place in Montgomery County.

== Location ==
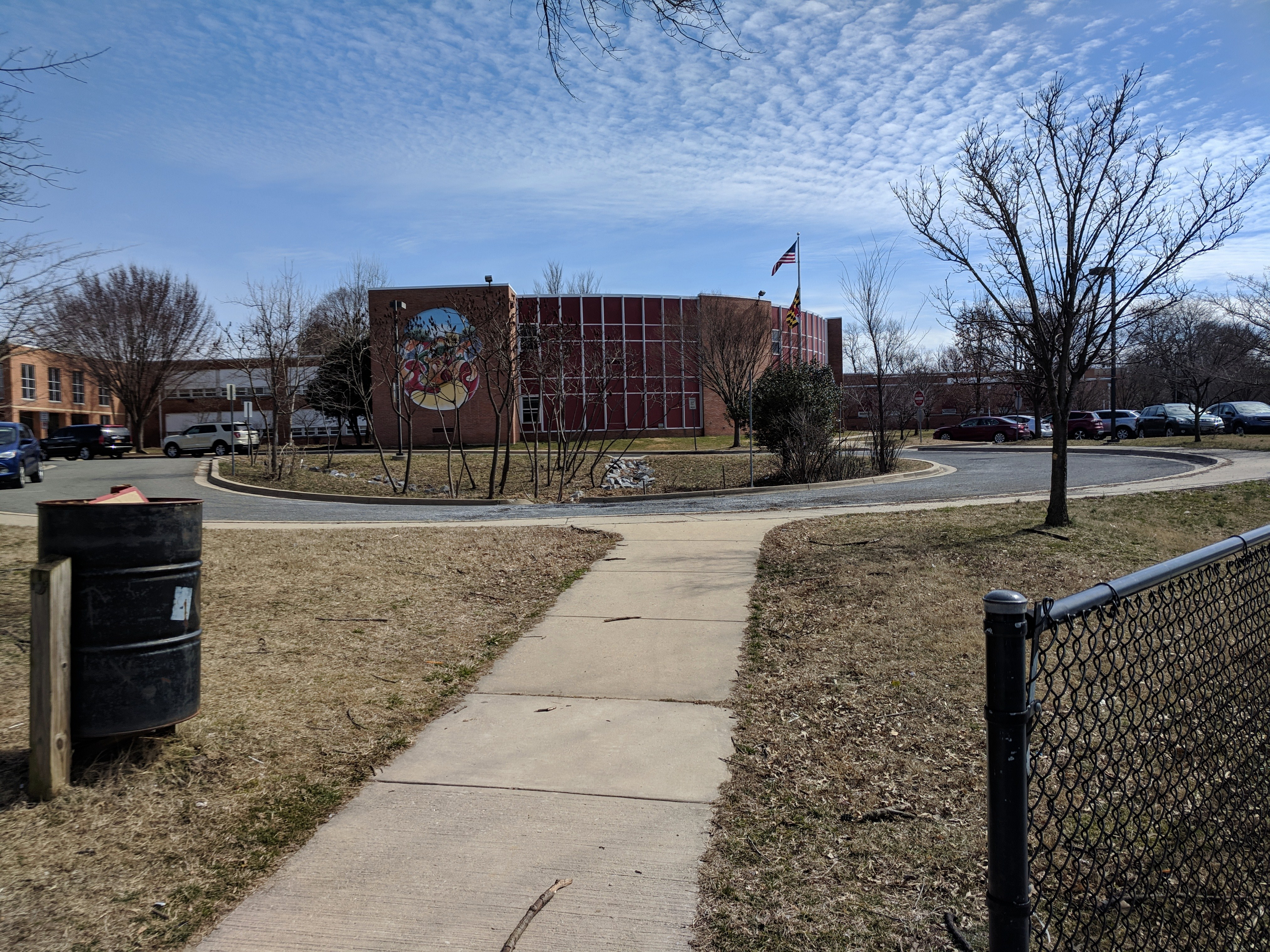
Eastern Middle School in Franklin Knolls, March 2019.

Franklin Knolls is bounded by the Capital Beltway to the north, University Boulevard to the west, the Northwest Branch of the Anacostia River to the east, and the neighborhood of Montgomery Knolls to the south which begins where East Melbourne Avenue intersects with Greer Avenue. Across University Boulevard to the west lies the neighborhoods of Indian Spring Terrace and Long Branch, while the neighborhoods of Oakview and Hillandale lie east across the Northwest Branch Anacostia River.

== Landmarks ==
Franklin Knolls is home to Eastern Middle School, located at the intersection of University Boulevard and East Franklin Avenue. Franklin Knolls is situated between the neighborhoods of Four Corners/Woodmoor to the northwest and the neighborhoods of Montgomery Knolls, Clifton Park Village, New Hampshire Estates, and Langley Park to the southeast.

The Franklin Knolls River Trail is a 4,625 feet long foot trail that passes through the neighborhood. The trail runs from East Franklin Avenue near the Franklin Knolls Swimming Pool along a tributary of the Northwest Branch of the Anacostia River and then follows alongside the Northwest Branch until it reaches the Montgomery Knolls neighborhood and turns into the Clifton Park River Trail. The Clifton Park River Trail continues through the neighborhoods of Montgomery Knolls and Clifton Park Village along the Northwest Branch until it reaches Montgomery Knolls Elementary School.

== History ==
Prior to the arrival of European colonizers, the land that Franklin Knolls was built on was inhabited by the Piscataway people. During the early and mid-19th century, the land that Franklin Knolls is located on was once a rural, agricultural area. In the 1930s, developers created the nearby neighborhoods of Four Corners, Woodmoor, Northwood Park, Indian Spring Village, Indian Spring Terrace, North Hills of Sligo, and Fairway. These neighborhoods were located near the intersection of Colesville Road and Old Bladensburg Road (now University Boulevard). Between 1945 and 1955, these subdivisions were expanded while the newer neighborhoods of Franklin Knolls and Northwood were created. Franklin Knolls was created as a residential development in the 1950s and early 1960s. The community was subdivided by Adam May Brady, Fred Bashwitz, and Elizabeth Bashwitz of Franklin Knolls Inc., as well as the Cafritz Construction Company, headed by Morris Cafritz and with Martin Atlas serving as secretary. The Cafritz Construction Company was the primary building/developer in the neighborhood. Cafritz was an influential developer who, prior to the passage of the 1968 Fair Housing Act, used racially restrictive covenants to exclude African Americans and other racial minorities from all-white suburban communities. Franklin Knolls was once entirely white and mostly Jewish or Catholic, in part due to proximity to two Jewish and Catholic institutions nearby: Temple Israel, a Conservative synagogue, and Saint Bernadette, a Roman Catholic school and church. The Jewish community has largely left the area, due to Temple Israel on University Boulevard closing and merging with Beth Tikva of Rockville (now the Tikvat Israel Congregation). Temple Israel was first founded in 1952 as the Langley Park Hebrew Congregation in order to serve the then growing Jewish population in Langley Park, Montgomery Knolls, and Franklin Knolls. The Temple's former building is now occupied by Mount Jezreel Baptist, a predominantly black church. Over time, the community has become more ethnically and racially diverse and has a mix of whites, African-Americans, Latinos, Asians, and others. In 2003, the Franklin Knolls Civic Association's newsletter was translated into Spanish and Vietnamese.

== Transportation ==
Franklin Knolls is serviced by Metrobus numbers C2 and C4, as well as by Ride On numbers 14 and 19. Washington Metro service is available on the Red Line in nearby Silver Spring, Wheaton, and Takoma. By 2027, Purple Line service will be available at the nearby Piney Branch Road and Long Branch stations.

== Notable people ==
- Eddie Huang — American author, chef, restaurateur, food personality, producer, and attorney

== See also ==
- Four Corners, Maryland
- Langley Park, Maryland
- Maryland Route 193
- Northwest Branch Anacostia River
- Woodmoor, Maryland
