= Manchester station =

Manchester station may refer to:

== United Kingdom ==
Manchester, England

- Manchester station group, a station fare group composed of:
  - Manchester Oxford Road railway station
  - Manchester Piccadilly station, the main railway station
  - Manchester Victoria station, a railway station and tram stop
  - Deansgate railway station
- Manchester Airport station, a multi-modal station at Manchester Airport
  - Manchester Airport High Speed station, a formerly planned High Speed Rail station at Manchester Airport
- Manchester Central railway station, a former railway station
- Manchester Chorlton Street coach station, a bus and coach station also known as Manchester Central coach station
- Manchester Exchange railway station, a former railway station
- Manchester Liverpool Road railway station, a former railway station
- Manchester Mayfield railway station, a former railway station
- Manchester Oldham Road railway station, a former passenger and goods station
- Manchester Piccadilly Gardens bus station, a bus station
- Manchester United Football Ground railway station, a railway station

== United States ==
- Manchester station (Los Angeles Metro), a busway station in Los Angeles, California
- Manchester station (MBTA), a commuter rail station in Manchester-by-the-Sea, Massachusetts
- Manchester Place station, an under-construction light rail station in Silver Spring, Maryland
- Maplewood–Manchester station, a light rail station in St. Louis County, Missouri
- Union Station (Manchester, New Hampshire), a former railway station

== See also ==
- Manchester Road railway station
