= Library station =

Library station could refer to:

- Library station (Pittsburgh Regional Transit), a light rail station in Pittsburgh, Pennsylvania
- Library station (Utah Transit Authority), a light rail station in Salt Lake City, Utah
- Shanghai Library station, a subway station in Shanghai, China
- Silver Spring Library station, a light rail station in Silver Spring, Maryland
- Harold Washington Library – State/Van Buren station, an elevated station in Chicago, Illinois
- State Library railway station, Melbourne, Australia
