= Four Corners, Maryland =

Neighborhood in Montgomery County, Maryland, United States

- Census-designated place
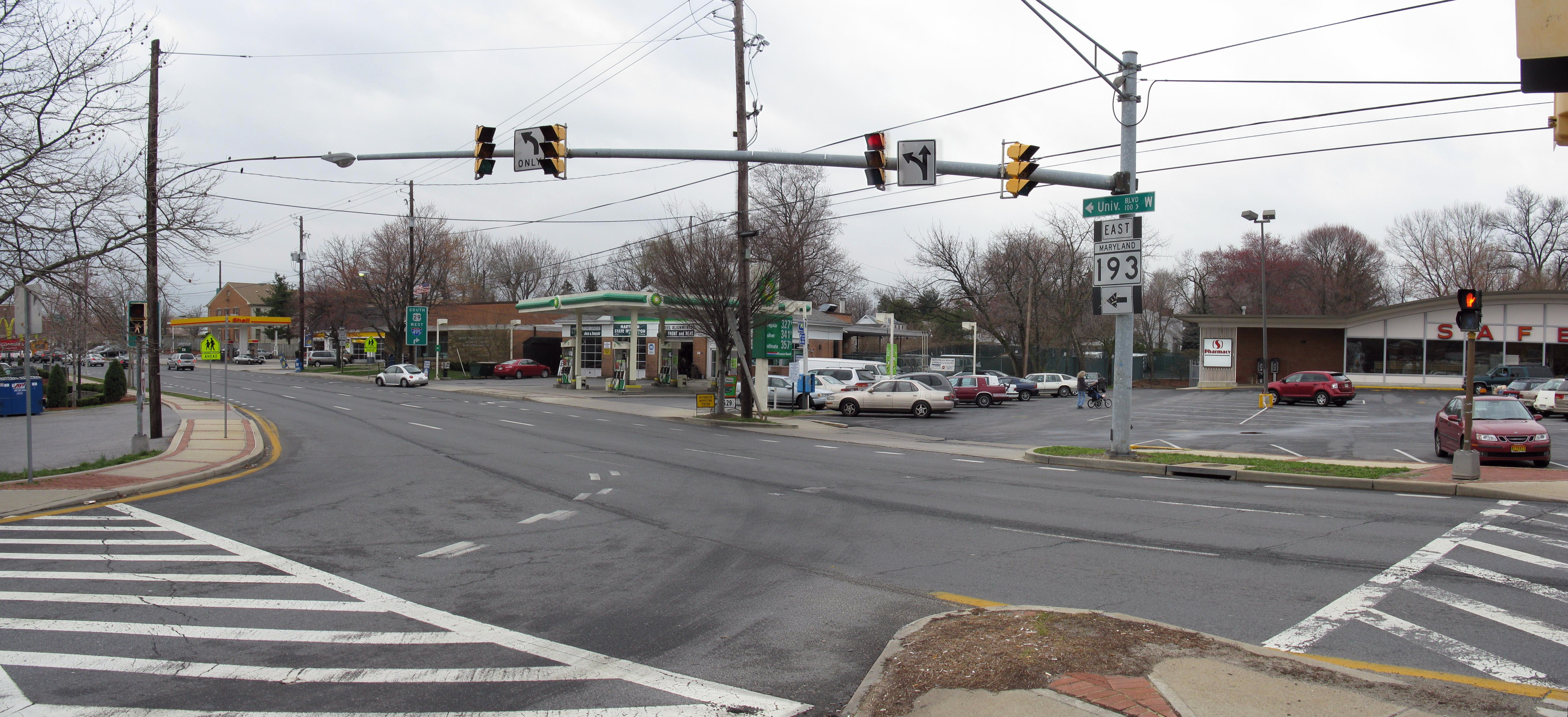
- Intersection of MD 193 and its western turnaround in Four Corners

- Location within Maryland Location within the United States
- Coordinates: 39°01′20″N 77°00′25″W
- Country: United States
- State: Maryland
- County: Montgomery
- Unincorporated community: Silver Spring

Area
  - Total: 1.48 sq mi (3.83 km^{2})
  - Land: 1.46 sq mi (3.79 km^{2})
  - Water: 0.012 sq mi (0.03 km^{2})
- Elevation: 312 ft (95 m)

Population (2020)
  - Total: 8,316
  - Density: 5,682.1/sq mi (2,193.89/km^{2})
- ZIP Code: 20901
- Area codes: 301, 240
- FIPS code: 24-29790
- GNIS feature IDs: 2583623

Four Corners is a neighborhood and census-designated place (CDP) in Montgomery County, Maryland, United States. Many residents consider the neighborhood a part of Silver Spring, to whose CDP it belonged until 2010. It had a population of 8,316 at the 2020 census.

== Location ==
Four Corners is bounded by Dennis Avenue to the northwest, the Northwest Branch Trail to the northeast, and Interstate 495 (Capital Beltway) to the south. It borders the neighborhoods of Woodmoor and Indian Spring Village, Franklin Knolls, Indian Spring Terrace, North Hills Sligo Park, and Burnt Mills Hills. The community of Northwood Park is also considered to be part of the Four Corners neighborhood, and is commonly known as Northwood-Four Corners or simply North Four Corners.

== Landmarks ==
Montgomery Blair High School (MBHS) is a public high school named after Montgomery Blair, the son of Francis Preston Blair, the founder of Silver Spring. Blair, a lawyer, represented Dred Scott in his United States Supreme Court case, and served as Postmaster General under President Abraham Lincoln. The school is nationally recognized for its magnet program and Communication Arts Program (CAP).

The Polychrome Historic District is a national historic district in the Four Corners neighborhood. It recognizes a group of five houses built by John Joseph Earley in 1934 and 1935.

The land that comprises North Four Corners Park was acquired in the mid-1940s. It was a plot of land for temporary homes for the military during World War II. It was a whites-only neighborhood for a short while. The park grew in size to 14 acres in 1998. The park features a recreation building, playground, ballfields, tennis courts, and a picnic area.

A number of historic homes exist in North Four Corners. These include the Silver Spring 1939 World's Fair Home (House No. 15 in the 'Town of Tomorrow'), and the brick Tudor Revival Washington Gas Model Home that opened the 1938 building program in Northwood Park.

== History ==
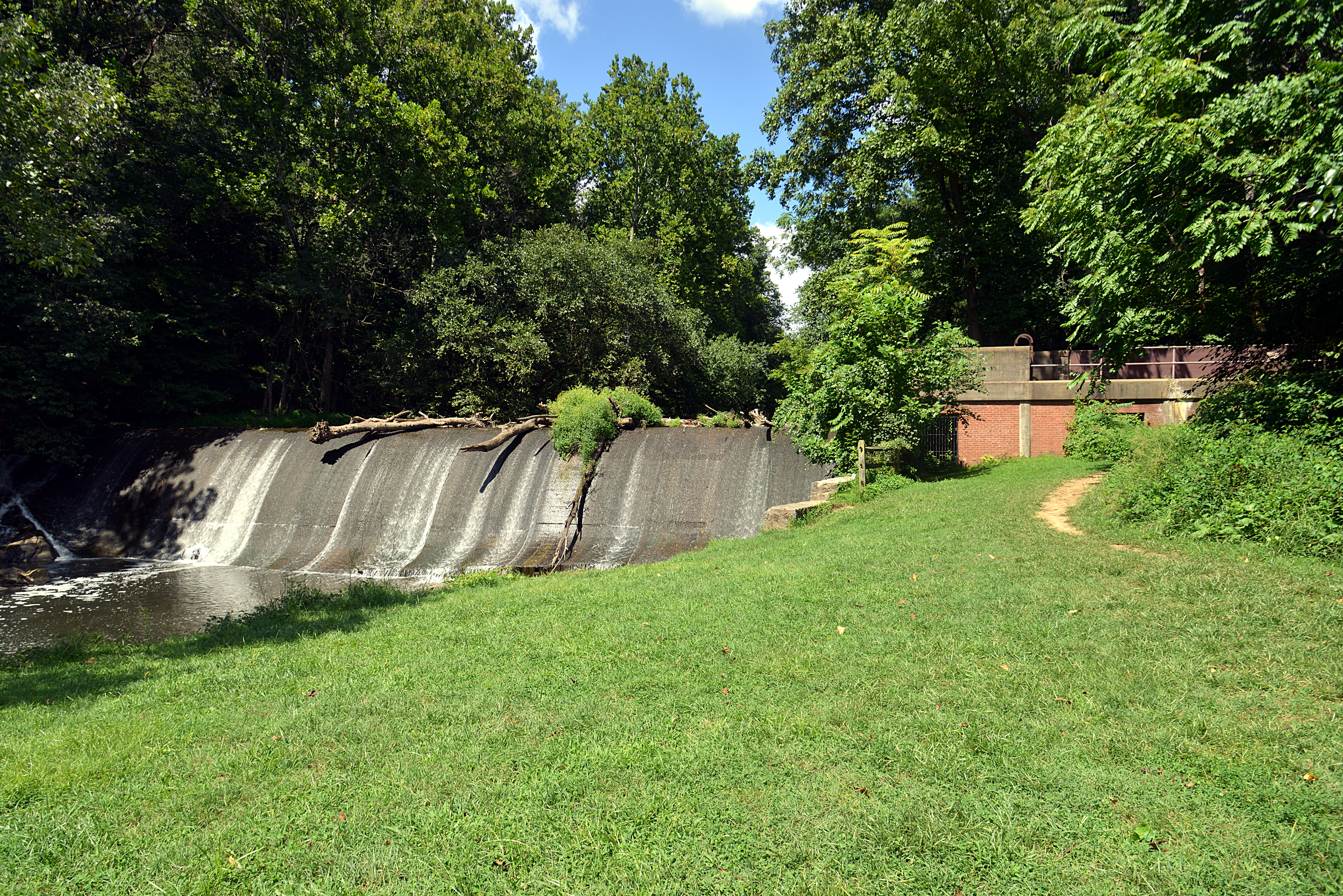
Burnt Mills Dam, Northwest Branch of the Anacostia River, Silver Spring, MD

In the 1700s, a water mill was built at the easternmost corner of Four Corners, where today's Colesville Road passes over the Northwest Branch of the Anacostia River and becomes Columbia Pike. The mill building burned down in 1788, hence the name Burnt Mills. Rebuilt in the late 1700s or early 1800s, ownership of the mill changed hands several times in the 19th century before closing down in the early years of the 20th century. The land was then donated to the Boy Scouts of America, who established a camp named for President Woodrow Wilson. In the early 1920s, the Boy Scouts donated part of the land to the Washington Suburban Sanitary Commission, and a temporary water filtration plant was erected at the site. Work on a new plant was completed in 1936, and the plant was named for the Washington Suburban Sanitary Commission's chief engineer, Robert B. Morse Filtration Plant. The dam and the two Georgian Revival pump houses were acquired by the Maryland-National Capital Park and Planning Commission between 1996 and 2000 and are now on the Historic Register. The Burnt Mills Dam parks (East and West) are a popular starting point for hikers of the Northwest Branch Trail, part of the Rachel Carson Greenway, whose northernmost section runs along the eastern and northern border of the neighborhood.

In the 19th century, there was an agricultural community located at the crossroads on the Bladensburg and Colesville Roads. The community remained rural until the post-World War I building boom in suburban Montgomery County. Four Corners came into being as a residential neighborhood between the world wars, beginning in the late 1930s with the development of Northwood Park, Woodmoor, Indian Spring Village, Indian Spring Terrace, North Hills of Sligo Park, and Fairway. These subdivisions expanded between 1945 and 1955 even as new ones, such as Northwood and Franklin Knolls, were constructed. The single-family house subdivisions that soon surrounded Four Corners had winding streets that formed an irregular grid in between major roads. Four Corners was largely developed by the late 1950s.

== Transportation ==
Four Corners is served by Metrobus route M12, as well as Ride On routes 8, 9, 19, and Flash BRT. Washington Metro service is available on the Red Line at the nearby Wheaton and Silver Spring stations. The Piney Branch Road station of the Purple Line will be built in nearby Long Branch at the intersection of University Boulevard and Piney Branch Road and is expected to be open to the public by 2027.

== Demographics ==
Historical population
Census	Pop.	Note	%±
2010	7,945		—
2020	8,316		4.7%
U.S. Decennial Census; 2010

=== 2020 census ===
As of the 2020 census, Four Corners had a population of 8,316. The median age was 39.9 years. 25.8% of residents were under the age of 18 and 15.2% of residents were 65 years of age or older. For every 100 females there were 92.2 males, and for every 100 females age 18 and over there were 92.9 males age 18 and over.

100.0% of residents lived in urban areas, while 0.0% lived in rural areas.

There were 2,865 households in Four Corners, of which 41.2% had children under the age of 18 living in them. Of all households, 62.2% were married-couple households, 11.4% were households with a male householder and no spouse or partner present, and 23.2% were households with a female householder and no spouse or partner present. About 19.2% of all households were made up of individuals and 10.7% had someone living alone who was 65 years of age or older.

There were 2,935 housing units, of which 2.4% were vacant. The homeowner vacancy rate was 0.6% and the rental vacancy rate was 1.8%.

Racial composition as of the 2020 census
Race	Number	Percent
White	5,091	61.2%
Black or African American	948	11.4%
American Indian and Alaska Native	40	0.5%
Asian	516	6.2%
Native Hawaiian and Other Pacific Islander	0	0.0%
Some other race	738	8.9%
Two or more races	983	11.8%
Hispanic or Latino (of any race)	1,436	17.3%

=== 2010 census ===
Four Corners first appeared as a census designated place in the 2010 U.S. census formed from part of Silver Spring CDP.

As of the 2010 United States census, the racial makeup of Four Corners was 67% White, 12.6% African American, 0% Native American or Alaska Native, 7.2% Asian, 0% Native Hawaiian or Pacific Islander, and 4.1% mixed race. Hispanics and Latinos of any race were 17.7% of the population. Non-Hispanic whites were 59.8% of the population.
