= Campus Drive–UMD station =

Rail station under construction in Maryland, US

Campus Drive–UMD
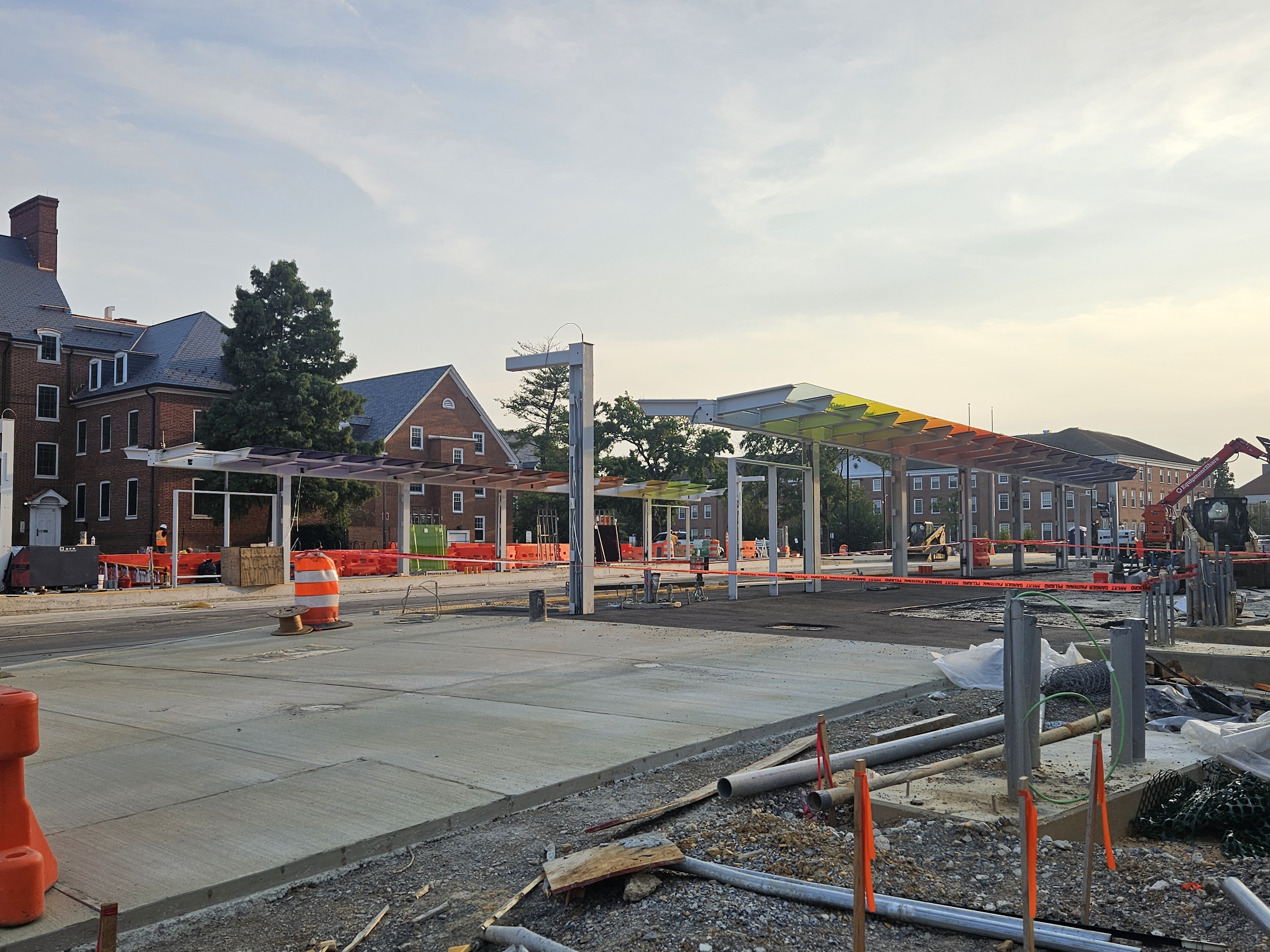
- The station under construction in August 2024

General information
- Location: Campus Drive at Library Lane; College Park, Maryland
- Coordinates: 38.98736°N 76.94580°W
- Owner: Maryland Transit Administration
- Platforms: 2 side platforms
- Tracks: 2

Construction
- Parking: None
- Accessible: yes

History
- Opening: 2027 (scheduled)

Services
Preceding station	Maryland Transit Administration	Following station
Adelphi Road–UMGC–UMD toward Bethesda	Purple Line	Baltimore Avenue–UMD toward New Carrollton
Location

Campus Drive–UMD station is an under-construction light rail station in College Park, Maryland, that will be served by the Purple Line. The station will be one of five stations serving the University of Maryland, College Park (UMD). It will have two side platforms on opposite sides of Campus Drive west of Library Lane, just south of Cole Field House.

== History ==
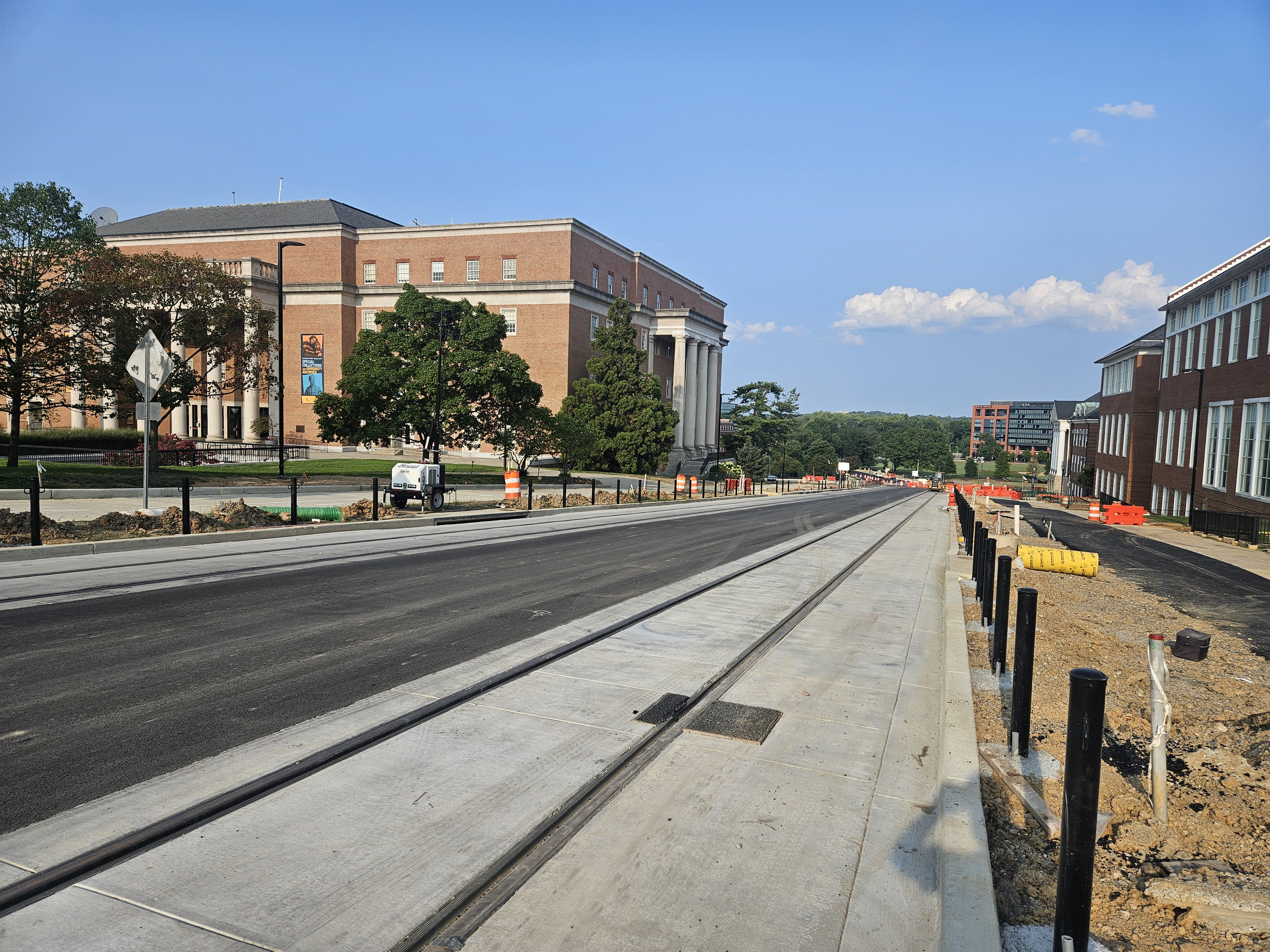
Finished tracks on Campus Drive in August 2024

Construction of the station began in 2019 with the removal of trees surrounding the path of the line through campus and the conversion of Campus Drive to a one-way street to create room for the tracks and related infrastructure. In January 2020, lead contractor Purple Line Transit Partners (PLTP) announced that the eastern half of the line from College Park to New Carrollton would open in late 2022, with the remainder scheduled for completion in June 2023. At the same time, construction of the infrastructure surrounding the station continued with the relocation of UMD's "M" Circle from a traffic circle on Campus Drive to a site on the roadside to allow for the demolition of the circle to make way for Purple Line tracks. Following completion of the new circle in September 2020, all Purple Line construction was paused due to a dispute between PLTP and the state over $800 million in unpaid cost overruns. PLTP withdrew from the project, forcing the MTA to take over construction of the line while an agreement was reached with a new contractor. As a result, UMD students, staff, and visitors reported difficulty with navigating the campus due to unfinished construction and the associated roadblocks and detours.

The MTA continued to directly manage construction of the line until June 26, 2022, when Maryland Transit Solutions (MTS) were approved as the new lead contractor. At the same time, MTS and the MTA announced that completion would be delayed from March 2022 to fall 2026 to allow for the entire line to be completed at once. A UMD spokesperson also announced that the university was advocating for construction on campus to be completed as soon as possible despite the significant delay. After the agreement with MTS, construction on campus ramped back up, with additional construction-related closures and detours along the line's route. This included the closure of three out of the five entrances to the primary on-campus lot for commuter students in January 2023, leading to congestion, a lack of spaces, and confused drivers and pedestrians. In Summer 2024, concerns over noise pollution from heavier construction on Campus Drive led UMD to close several dorms that were the closest to the construction.

As of 2026, the Purple Line is scheduled to open in late 2027.
