= Woodmoor, Maryland =

Neighborhood of Silver Spring, Maryland, US

Coordinates: 39°1′22.98″N 77°0′15.75″W

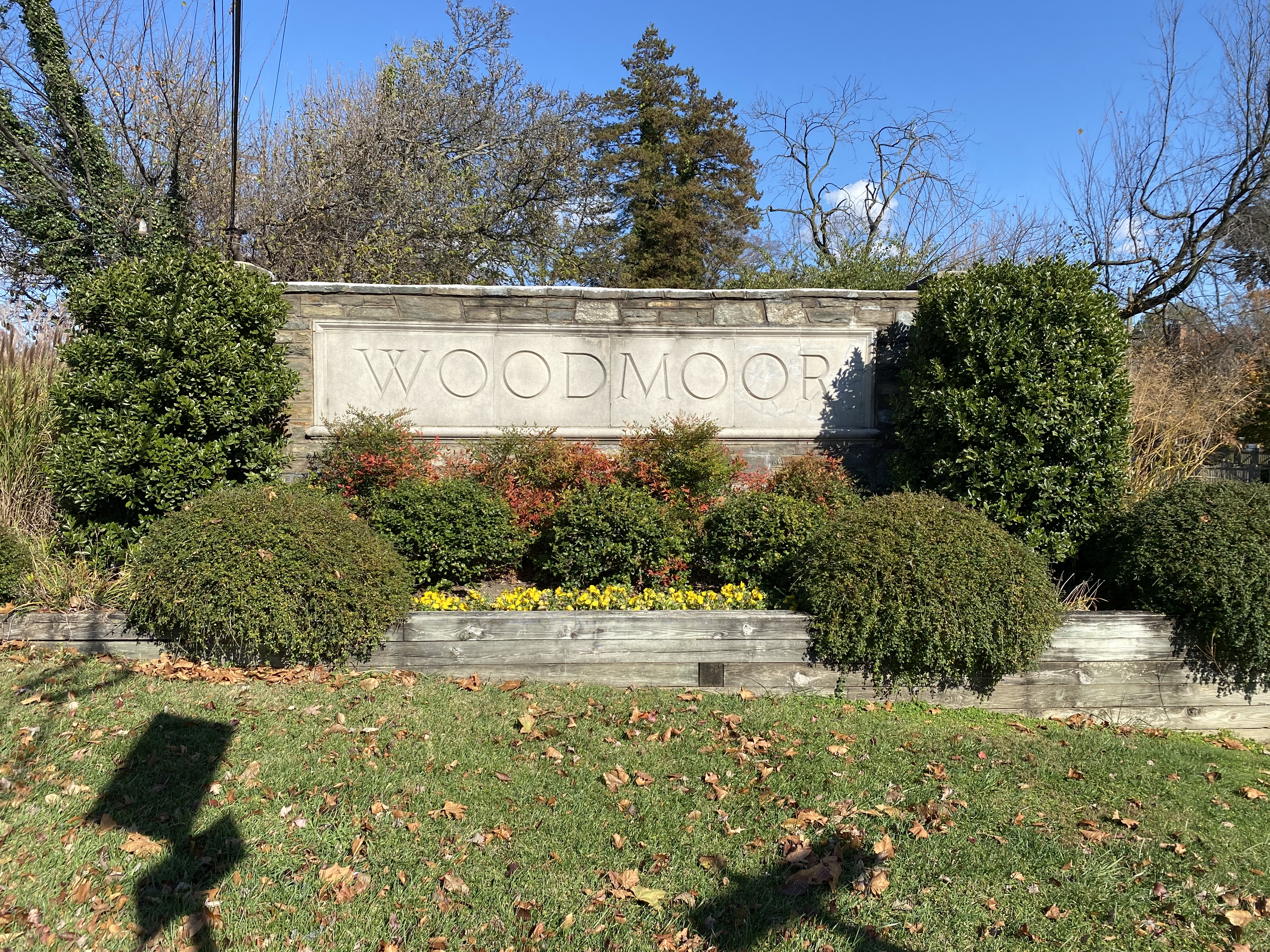
Woodmoor welcome sign

Woodmoor is a neighborhood in the northern section of Silver Spring, Maryland in southeastern Montgomery County, in the U.S. state of Maryland. Its borders extend from U.S. 29 to the west, Northwest Branch Park to the north, the Capital Beltway (I-95) to the east, and University Boulevard to the south. It lies on one of the "Four Corners" at the northeastern corner of the intersection of Colesville Road (U.S. 29), and University Boulevard (Maryland 193).

== History ==
The first houses in the neighborhood were built in the late 1930s.

In the 1950s, a kosher deli/restaurant and bakery opened in Four Corners called "Sid Mandell's Restaurant & Deli", owned by Sidney "Sid" Mandell, the son of Jewish immigrants from Austria and Russia. The deli was a popular cultural icon and was open seven days a week. After Jewish residents began leaving Four Corners, the owner retired and the deli was closed in 1980. The building where the deli used to be is now occupied by Righttime Medical Care, an urgent care center.

== Culture ==
Winding streets and lots of old trees distinguish this neighborhood. Pinecrest Elementary School lies in the neighborhood, and Montgomery Blair High School is just steps across University Boulevard. Highlights of the year are the community Christmas tree lighting and the Menorah, a local Oktoberfest, the annual Pride Parade, and the music festival WOODMOORstock, which began in 2022, and features more than 60 local bands.

== Transportation ==
Washington Metro service is available on the Red Line at the nearby Wheaton and Silver Spring stations. Woodmoor is served by Metrobus numbers Z6, Z8, C2, and C4, as well as Ride On number 9. The Piney Branch Road station of the Purple Line will be built in nearby Long Branch at the intersection of University Boulevard and Piney Branch Road and is expected to be open to the public by 2022.

The neighborhood also has the dubious distinction of being serviced by the "Sorriest Bus Stop in America", according to a survey performed by Streetsblog. The bus stop is located at the intersection of Route 29 and Crestmoor Drive. Following the death of a local resident at the corner of Crestmoor and Rt. 29, the bus stop was discontinued as of August, 2026.
