= Dale Drive station =

Future light rail station in Maryland

Dale Drive
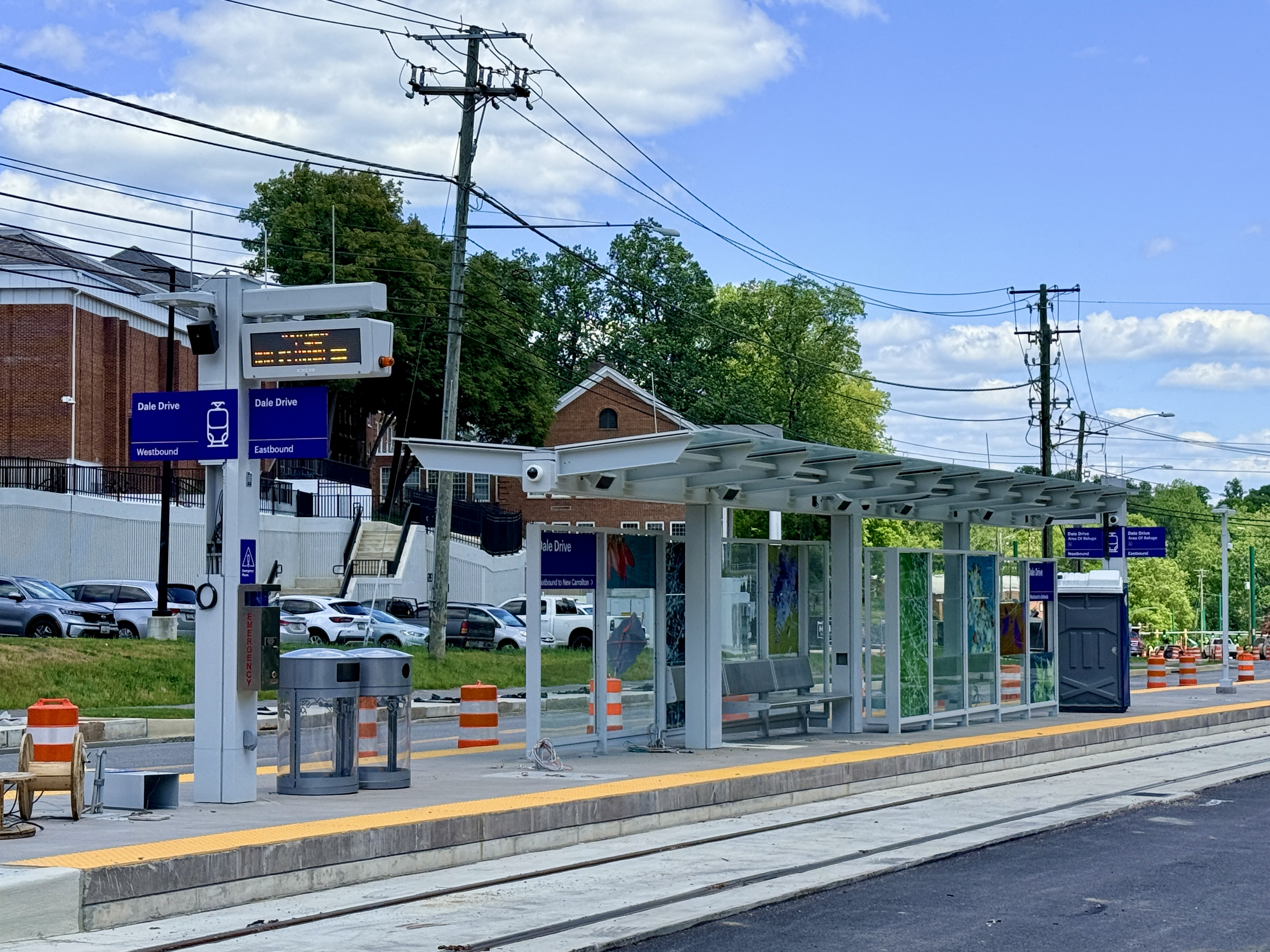
- Construction of the station platform in 2026

General information
- Location: Wayne Avenue at Dale Drive; Silver Spring, Maryland
- Coordinates: 38.999472°N 77.016672°W
- Owner: Maryland Transit Administration
- Platforms: 1 island platform
- Tracks: 2

Construction
- Parking: None
- Accessible: yes

History
- Opening: 2027 (scheduled)

Services
Preceding station	Maryland Transit Administration	Following station
Silver Spring Library toward Bethesda	Purple Line	Manchester Place toward New Carrollton
Location

Dale Drive station is an under-construction light rail station in Silver Spring, Maryland, that will be served by the Purple Line. The station will have an island platform on the north side of Wayne Avenue just east of Dale Drive, adjacent to Silver Spring International Middle School. As of 2026, the Purple Line is planned to open in late 2027.
