= The "M" =

Commemorative mound at the University of Maryland

Coordinates: 38.9876°N 76.9400°W

University of Maryland, College Park campus
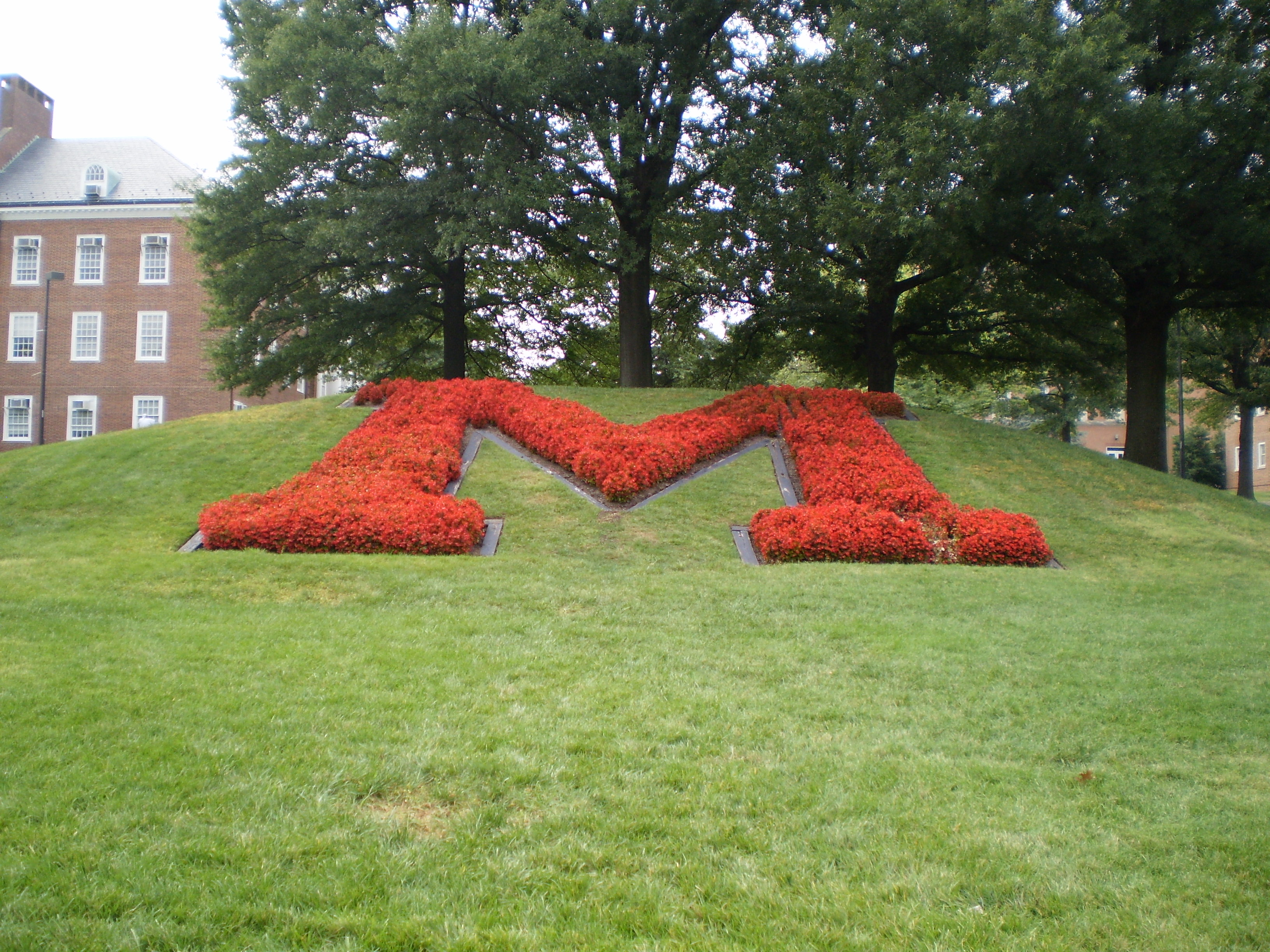
The "M"

The "M" is a commemorative mound on the campus of the University of Maryland, College Park. Created in 1976 to celebrate the American Bicentennial, the mound is noted for the large floral "M" that sits in its center. The flowers that make up the "M" are replaced twice annually, red 'Vodka' begonias are planted each spring for the warmer months and replaced with yellow pansies each fall.

In the past, the M had been planted with flowers other than pansies and begonias. One year 1,200 tulip bulbs were planted in the fall and after blooming were replaced with around 3,500 marigolds or vodka begonias in the spring. In 1986 and 1987, the graduating classes donated funds for lighting the M.

As part of the construction of the Purple Line route through campus, the formerly named "M" Circle was relocated and renamed The "M". The new "M" is no longer in the middle of a traffic circle and instead sits as a mound on the campus's Engineering Fields, across the street from its original site. Work on the new circle was completed in 2020.

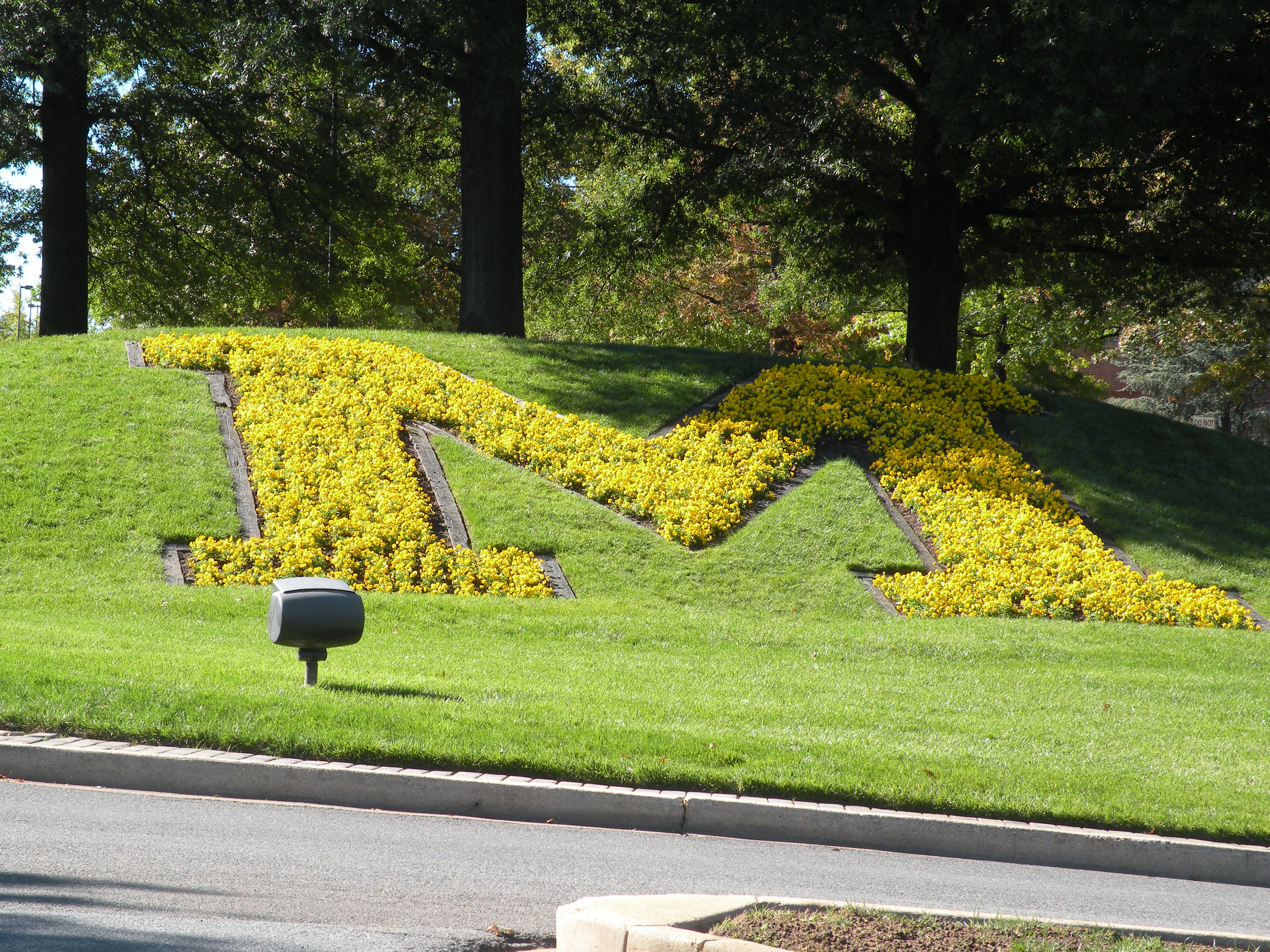
The original "M" Circle in October 2010 planted with yellow pansies.
