= Silver Spring Library station =

Future light rail station in Maryland

Silver Spring Library
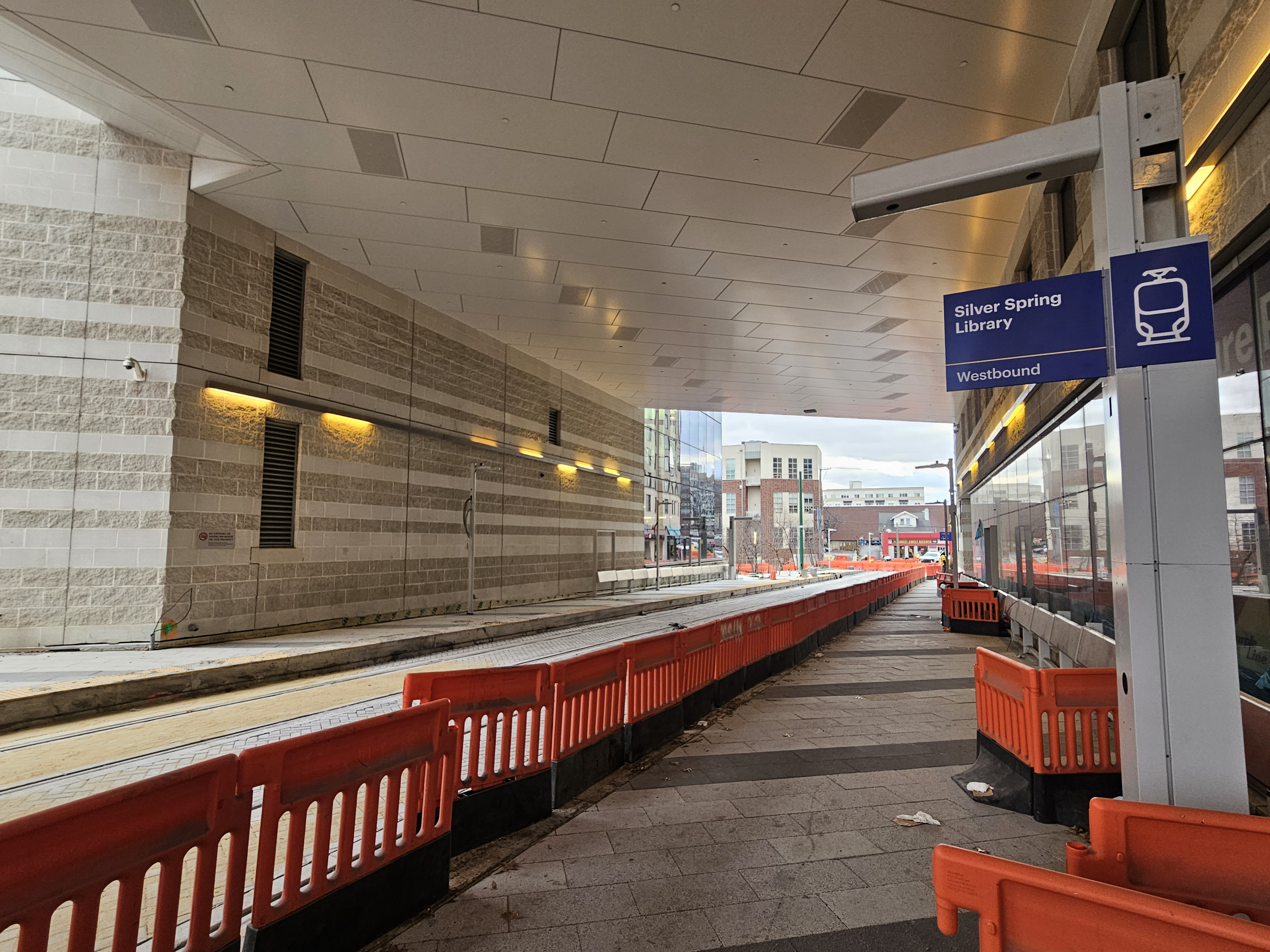
- The station under construction in December 2025

General information
- Location: 900 Wayne Avenue; Silver Spring, Maryland
- Coordinates: 38.995008°N 77.024567°W
- Owner: Maryland Transit Administration
- Platforms: 2 side platforms
- Tracks: 2

Construction
- Parking: None
- Accessible: yes

History
- Opening: 2027 (scheduled)

Services
Preceding station	Maryland Transit Administration	Following station
Silver Spring toward Bethesda	Purple Line	Dale Drive toward New Carrollton
Location

Silver Spring Library is an under-construction light rail station in Silver Spring, Maryland, that will be served by the Purple Line. The station will have two side platforms under the east side of the Brigadier General Charles E. McGee Library (Silver Spring Library). Space for the station was included in the construction of the library, which opened in 2015. As of 2026, the Purple Line is planned to open in late 2027.
