= Manchester Place station =

Future light rail station in Maryland

Manchester Place
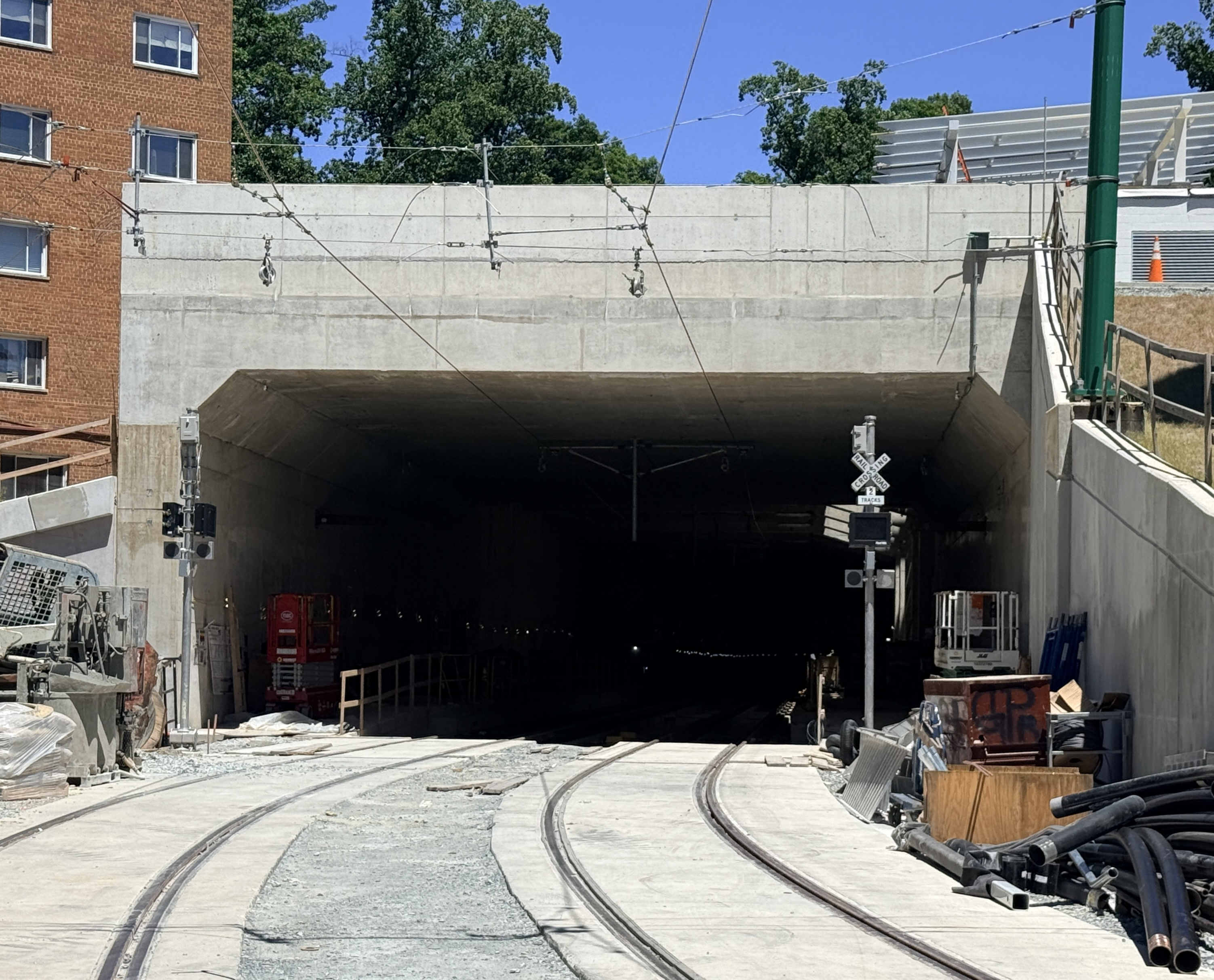
- The station under construction in 2026

General information
- Location: 100 Plymouth Street; Silver Spring, Maryland
- Coordinates: 39.0011°N 77.0078°W
- Owner: Maryland Transit Administration
- Platforms: 2 side platforms
- Tracks: 2

Construction
- Structure type: Underground
- Parking: None
- Accessible: yes

History
- Opening: 2027 (scheduled)

Services
Preceding station	Maryland Transit Administration	Following station
Dale Drive toward Bethesda	Purple Line	Long Branch toward New Carrollton
Location

Manchester Place station is an under-construction light rail station in Silver Spring, Maryland, that will be served by the Purple Line. The station will be located underground between Wayne Avenue and Plymouth Street at the west end of the Plymouth Tunnel. It will have two side platforms and access from both streets. As of 2026, the Purple Line is planned to open in late 2027.
