= Manchester Road railway station =

Manchester Road railway station may refer to:

- Burnley Manchester Road railway station in Burnley, Lancashire, England
- Manchester Road railway station (West Yorkshire), a station in Bradford, England
