= Long Branch station (Maryland) =

Future light rail station in Maryland

Long Branch
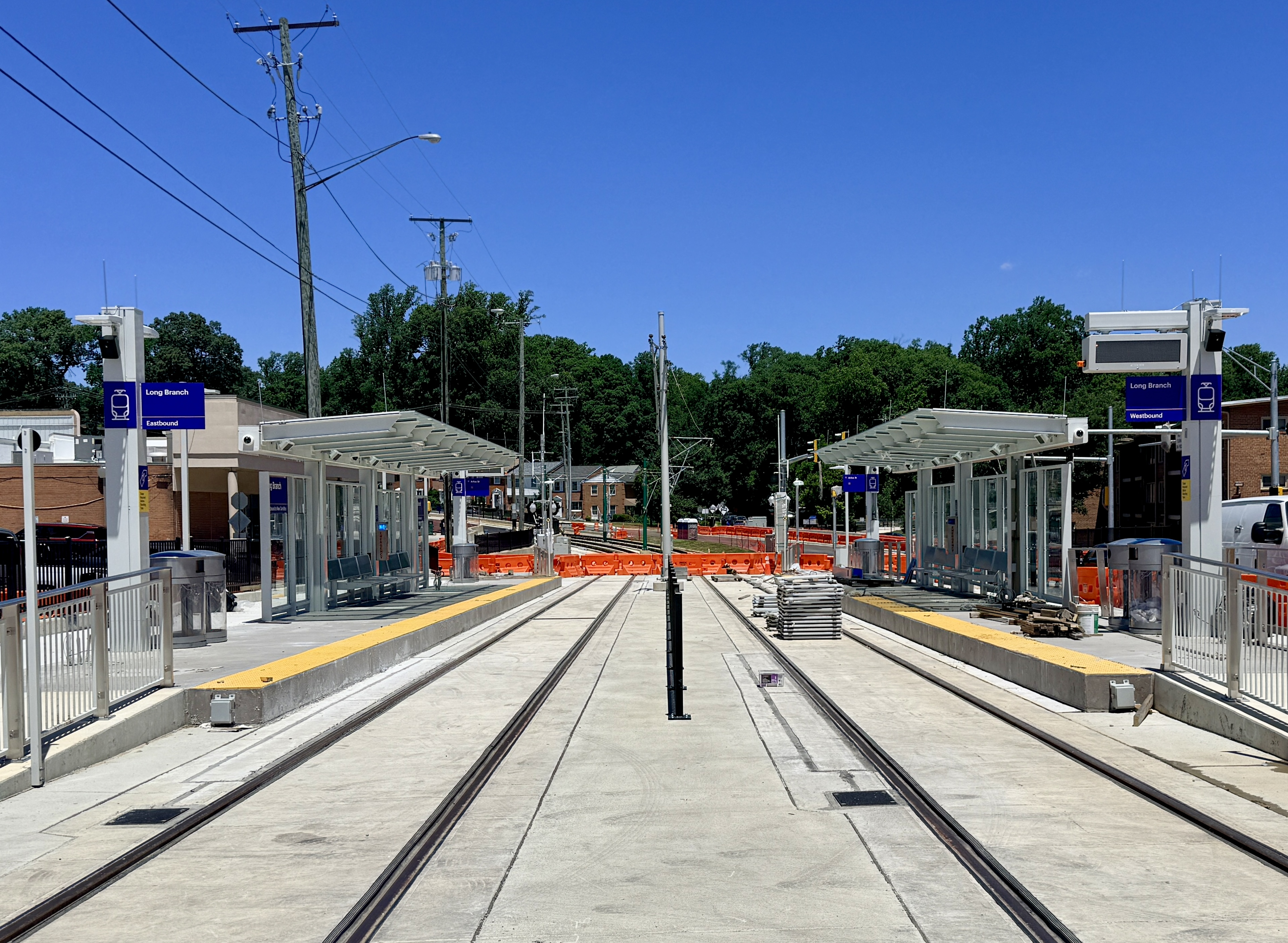
- The station during construction in 2026

General information
- Location: 8736 Arliss Street; Silver Spring, Maryland
- Coordinates: 38.99906°N 77.00137°W
- Owner: Maryland Transit Administration
- Platforms: 2 side platforms
- Tracks: 2

Construction
- Parking: None
- Accessible: yes

History
- Opening: 2027 (scheduled)

Services
| Preceding station | Maryland Transit Administration | Following station |
|---|---|---|
| Manchester Place toward Bethesda | Purple Line | Piney Branch Road toward New Carrollton |
Location

Long Branch station is an under-construction light rail station in Silver Spring, Maryland, that will be served by the Purple Line. The station will have two side platforms on the west side of Arliss Street, just north of Piney Branch Road. Earlier plans called for an island platform. As of 2026, the Purple Line is planned to open in late 2027.
