= Piney Branch Road station =

Future light rail station in Maryland

Piney Branch Road
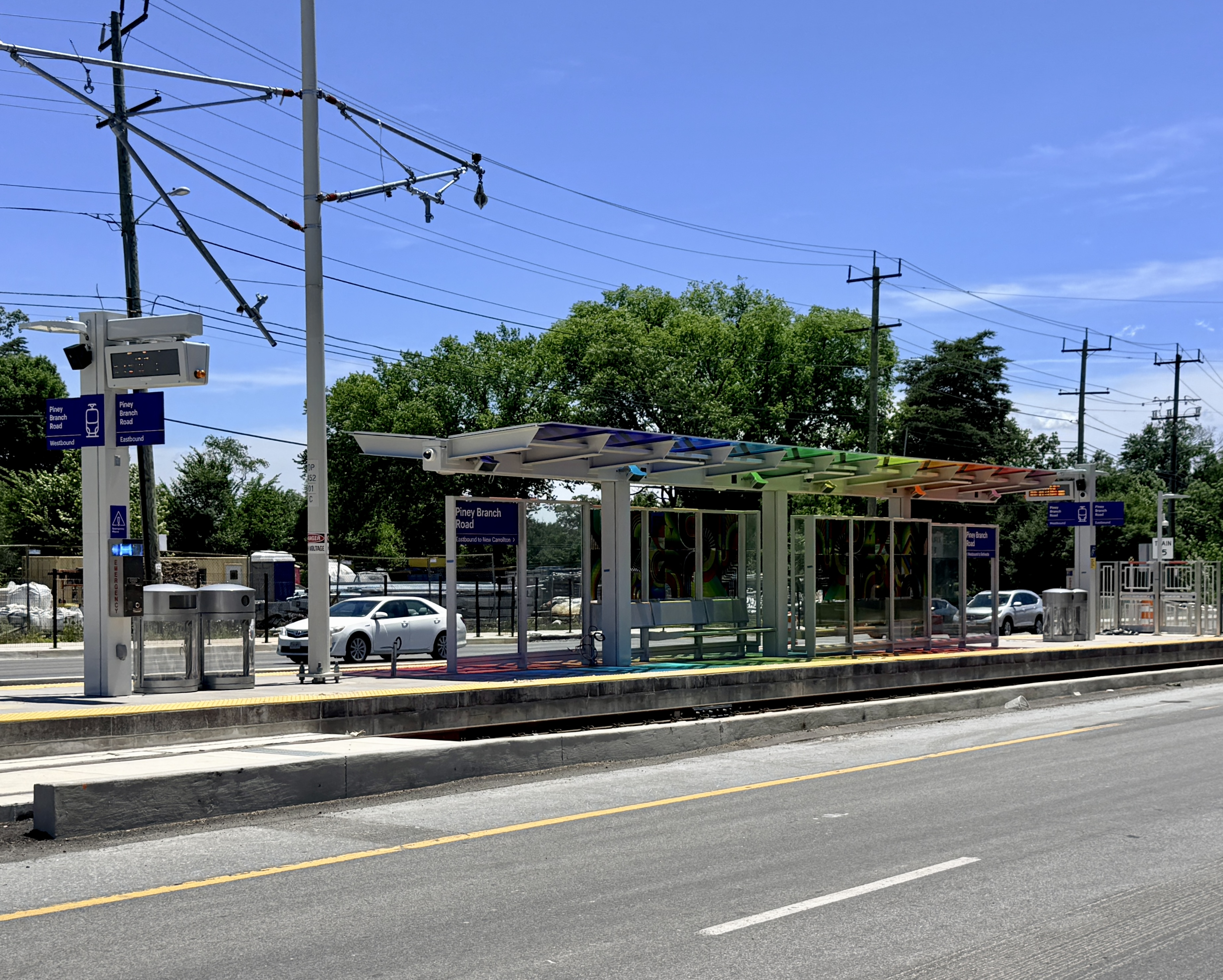
- The station during construction in June 2026

General information
- Location: University Boulevard at Piney Branch Road; Silver Spring, Maryland
- Coordinates: 38.99929°N 76.99517°W
- Owner: Maryland Transit Administration
- Platforms: 1 island platform
- Tracks: 2

Construction
- Parking: None
- Accessible: yes

History
- Opening: 2027 (scheduled)

Services
Preceding station	Maryland Transit Administration	Following station
Long Branch toward Bethesda	Purple Line	Takoma Langley toward New Carrollton
Location

Piney Branch Road station is an under-construction light rail station in Silver Spring, Maryland, that will be served by the Purple Line. The station will have an island platform in the median of University Boulevard just south of Piney Branch Road. As of 2026, the Purple Line is planned to open in late 2027.
