= Purple Line (Maryland) =

Under-construction light rail line in the US

- Purple Line train testing in September 2026

Overview
- Status: Under construction > 90% complete (July 2026)
- Owner: Maryland Transit Administration
- Locale: Montgomery County, Maryland; Prince George's County, Maryland, U.S.
- Termini: Bethesda (West); New Carrollton (East)
- Stations: 21
- Website: purplelinemd.com

Service
- Type: Light rail
- System: Maryland Transit Administration
- Rolling stock: 28 CAF LRVs
- Daily ridership: 64,800 (2030 projection)

History
- Planned opening: Late 2027

Technical
- Track length: 16.2 mi (26.1 km)
- Character: At-grade, elevated, and underground
- Track gauge: 4 ft 8 1/2 in (1,435 mm) standard gauge
- Electrification: Overhead line, 1,500 V DC
- Operating speed: 55 mph (89 km/h)
Route map
Purple Line highlighted in purple

The Purple Line is a 16.2-mile (26.1 km) light rail line being built to link several Maryland suburbs of Washington, D.C.: Bethesda, Silver Spring, College Park, and New Carrollton. Slated to open in late 2027, the line will enable riders to move between the Maryland branches of the Red, Green, Yellow, Silver, and Orange lines of the Washington Metro, and between all three lines of the MARC commuter rail system, without riding into central Washington. The project is administered by the Maryland Transit Administration (MTA), an agency of the Maryland Department of Transportation (MDOT), and not the Washington Metropolitan Area Transit Authority (WMATA), which operates Metro.

Throughout its decades-long planning process, the project was dogged by resistance, particularly from residents of the upscale community of Chevy Chase and members of the Columbia Country Club. From 2003 to 2006, Maryland Governor Robert Ehrlich changed the proposed mode of transportation from light rail to bus rapid transit. Legal attempts to thwart the line continued even after construction had begun; but in December 2017, the U.S. Court of Appeals for the D.C. Circuit ruled that Purple Line construction could continue despite these objections.

In 2016, a consortium headed by Fluor Enterprises won the $5.6 billion PPP contract to design and build the Purple Line, then to operate and maintain it for 36 years. Construction began in August 2017. Work halted in September 2020, when the consortium withdrew from the contract, citing mounting delays and disputes with the state government. The project had already consumed $1.1 billion of the anticipated $2 billion construction cost.

A new general contractor was selected in November 2021, and a new contract was signed in April 2022. This new agreement added $3.7 billion to the total cost of building, running, and maintaining the Purple Line for 30 years, bringing it to $9.3 billion. Construction costs alone rose $1.46 billion, bringing the total to $3.4 billion. Full-scale construction activity resumed in summer 2022.

Costs rose and the opening date receded again in 2023 and 2024. As of March 2024, the estimated cost to build the line and operate it through 2057 was $9.53 billion, some $4 billion over the initial 2016 budget of $5.6 billion. Train service is expected to begin in December 2027.

== History ==
=== Early studies, public debate, design ===
Topological map of the Washington Metro system with the Purple Line

The "Purple Line" has been the name of two different transit proposals. In 1994, John J. Corley Jr., an architect with Harry Weese Associates (which designed the Washington Metro system), proposed a multibillion-dollar Metro line around the 64-mile (103 km) Capital Beltway. This would have served as a "ring" line, connecting suburb to suburb and complementing the existing Metro lines, which radiate from Washington. (See Rapid transit § Network topologies.) In 1998, Montgomery County Executive Douglas M. Duncan and Governor Parris Glendening voiced support for the proposed Beltway Purple Line, a $10 billion, 30-mile (48 km) line from National Harbor to Montgomery Mall.

In 1987, after CSX expressed a desire to abandon the Georgetown Branch rail line, Maryland leaders began planning to repurpose it for transit and a hiking trail. The idea of adapting the railroad for a transit line dated at least to October 1970, when it appeared in a Master Plan for the Bethesda-Chevy Chase Planning Area. Montgomery County purchased its portion of the railroad right-of-way from CSX in 1988 and the following year budgeted $107 million to build a trolley between Bethesda and Silver Spring and a pair of trails between Silver Spring and the District.

Eventually, this proposal came to be known as the "Inner Purple Line" to distinguish it from the "Beltway Purple Line". By 2001, the "Beltway Purple Line" proposal had been abandoned as too costly and the name was attached to the Bethesda to New Carrollton line.

Robert Flanagan, the Maryland State Secretary of Transportation under Governor Robert Ehrlich, merged the Purple Line proposal with the Georgetown Branch Light Rail Transit (GBLRT) line. The GBLRT was proposed as a light rail transit line from Silver Spring westward, following the former Georgetown Branch of the Baltimore and Ohio Railroad, now a short CSX siding and the Capital Crescent Trail, to Bethesda.

In March 2003, the Ehrlich administration renamed the project the "Bi-County Transitway", reflecting a proposal by Ehrlich and Flanagan to use bus rapid transit instead of light rail, and because the name "Purple Line" seemed to suggest a new heavy-rail system like the color-named lines of the Washington Metro system. The new name did not catch on; several media outlets and most citizens continued to refer to the "Purple Line". In 2007, Governor Martin O'Malley and Secretary of Transportation John Porcari reverted to "Purple Line".

In January 2008, the O'Malley administration allocated $100 million within a six-year capital budget to complete design documents for state approval and funding of the Purple Line. In May 2008, it was projected that the Purple Line would have about 68,000 daily trips. A draft environmental impact study was issued on October 20, 2008. On December 22, 2008, Montgomery County planners endorsed building a light rail line rather than a bus line. On January 15, 2009, the county planning board also endorsed the light rail option, and County Executive Isiah Leggett has also expressed support. On October 21, 2009, members of the National Capital Region Transportation Planning Board voted unanimously to approve the Purple Line light rail project for inclusion into the region's Constrained Long-Range Transportation Plan.

Planners proposed to use existing Washington Metro stations and to accept the WMATA's SmarTrip farecard. Metro's 2008 annual report envisioned that the Purple Line would be fully integrated with the existing Washington Metro transit system by 2030.

The proposed project drew support and opposition in the community:

==== Support for Purple Line ====
- Purple Line Now is a non-profit organization that advocated for a Purple Line light rail line from Bethesda to New Carrollton to be integrated with a hiker/biker trail from Bethesda to Silver Spring.
- The Action Committee for Transit is a community group that supports the Purple Line.
- The Washington Post editorial board endorsed the Purple Line light rail option in 2008.
- The Montgomery County Council and Prince George's County Council voted unanimously in favor of the light rail option for the Purple Line in January 2009.
- Maryland state officials (including former Governor Martin O'Malley) are also strong Purple Line advocates. State officials say that a Purple Line, which is to run primarily above ground, "would provide better east–west transit service, particularly for lower-income workers who cannot afford cars."
- The development firm Chevy Chase Land Company is a strong proponent of the construction of the Purple Line. The website for the pro-Purple umbrella group Purple Line NOW! lists CCLC president Edward Asher as a member of its board of directors. The Washington Post stated that the development firm would "no doubt profit from property it owns near at least one of the proposed stations."
- The Sierra Club advocates a larger-scale rail system to parallel the Capital Beltway and link all existing Metro lines at their peripheries. This environmental group advocates rail transit over car use because carbon emissions are a major cause of climate change.
- Some student leaders (the Student Government Association and Graduate Student Government) at the University of Maryland support transit alternatives to campus.
- On January 27, 2009, the Montgomery County Council voted to support the light rail option. Governor O'Malley announced his own approval on August 4, 2009.
- The vice president of trail development for the Rails-to-Trails Conservancy has said that with proper design, the trail-Purple Line combination can be "among the best in the nation."
- Members of the Facebook group New Urbanist Memes for Transit-Oriented Teens were "irrationally excited for the forthcoming Maryland purple line."

==== Support for bus ====
- A 2008 study by Sam Schwartz Engineering for the Town of Chevy Chase supported bus rapid transit using an alternate Jones Bridge Road alignment. The Chevy Chase study expressed concerns about the expected ridership numbers, carbon footprint, interruptions in recreation pathways, and the cost of bus and light rail proposals by the MTA involving a Capital Crescent Trail alignment. Although a Jones Bridge Road alignment was also proposed by the MTA, the study noted that features typical of bus rapid transit that were missing from the MTA proposal.

==== Opposition to rail ====
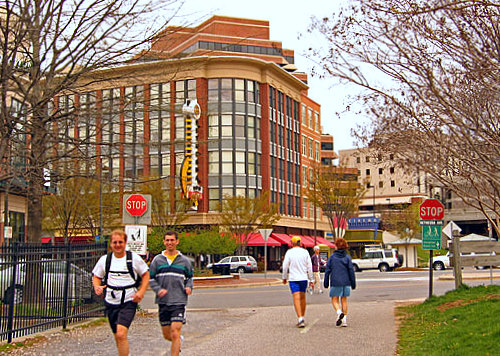
Opponents argued that the Purple Line would hurt the Capital Crescent Trail (pictured).

- A not-for-profit local organization, Friends of the Capital Crescent Trail, began collecting signatures on a petition opposing the MTA's Purple Line proposals in 2003; in 2014, it filed a lawsuit in the U.S. District Court in the District of Columbia asserting that the Federal Transit Administration had not complied with federal environmental laws when it approved a grant to help build the Purple Line. In 2008, the organization's website asserted that the MTA's light rail and bus rapid transit proposals would undermine the environment and safety on the Capital Crescent Trail, and endorsed running bus rapid transit on Jones Bridge Road, as recommended by the Chevy Chase study. But the petition called for yet a different option because the Jones Bridge Road route would affect the trail.
- A leading opponent of the Purple Line was the Columbia Country Club, a private club whose golf course occupies both sides of the planned route between Bethesda and Silver Spring. The club, "long viewed as one of the most well-financed and politically connected Purple Line foes", spent thousands of dollars over a decade lobbying state and federal officials, hosting fundraisers for sympathetic politicians, and organizing "grassroots" opposition. In 2013, newly elected leaders of the Club signed an agreement not to oppose the Purple Line if its route were adjusted by 12 feet (3.66 m) and other concessions were granted.
- Opponents in the Town of Chevy Chase cited the town's study of bus rapid transit alternatives. The study estimated a cost of less than $1 billion for a bus rapid transit system, compared with an estimated cost of $1.8 billion for light rail. A 2011 news report placed the cost of the rail line at US$1.93 billion.
- In 2010, residents around the Dale Wayne stop worried that doubling the size of the road, along with the county's "smart growth" policy around transit stops, would encourage commercial development in a residential neighborhood. They wondered about the accuracy of the MTA's prediction that the Dale station would see 1,427 daily boardings.

=== Approval ===
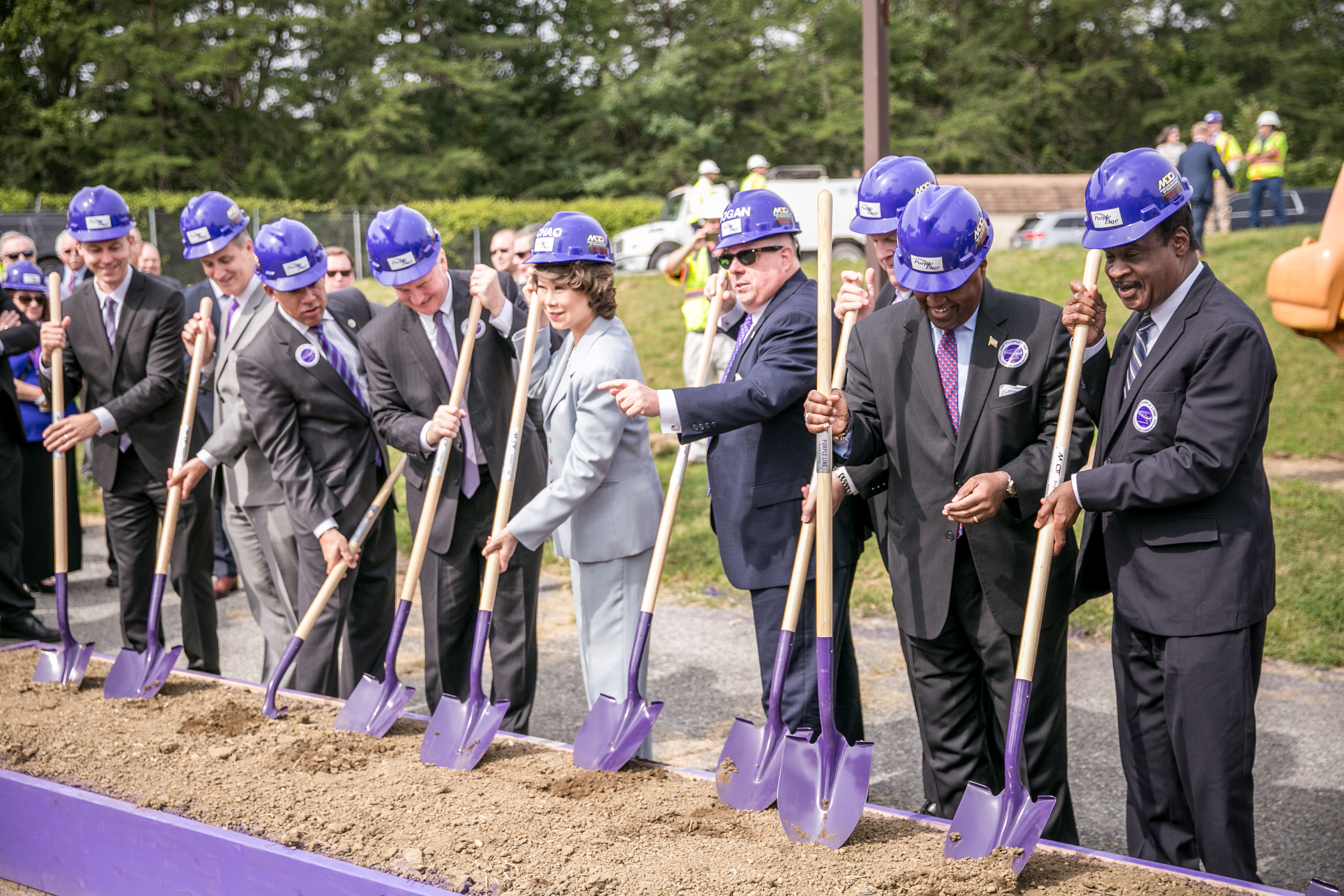
Groundbreaking ceremony for the Purple Line on August 28, 2017

In June 2015, the Purple Line was approved by Governor Larry Hogan, who opposed the project while campaigning in 2014. Hogan cancelled its sister project, the Baltimore Red Line, citing excessive costs, and reduced the state's contribution to the Purple Line from $700 million to $168 million, putting the difference toward highway construction. To make up the difference, Prince George's and Montgomery counties would contribute more money and the frequency of train service would be reduced.

The Purple Line was procured as a full design-build-finance-operate-maintain public–private partnership. On December 7, 2015, four teams composed of major American and international firms submitted their bids to realize the project:

- Maryland Purple Line Partners: Vinci Concessions, Walsh Investors, InfraRed Capital, Alstom and Keolis
- Maryland Transit Connectors: John Laing Investments, Kiewit Development Company, Edgemoor Infrastructure & Real Estate and RATP Dev
- Purple Line Transit Partners: Meridiam, Fluor Corporation, Star America, CAF and Alternate Concepts
- Purple Plus Alliance: Macquarie Capital Group, Skanska, Kinki Sharyo and Transdev.

On March 2, 2016, Hogan announced that the state had chosen Purple Line Transit Partners to build, operate, and maintain the Purple Line for $3.3 billion over 36 years, with service to start in late 2022.

On April 6, 2016, the Maryland Board of Public Works (composed of Hogan, State Treasurer Nancy K. Kopp, and State Comptroller Peter Franchot) unanimously approved the contract. The $5.6 billion contract is 876 pages long and, according to The Washington Post is "believed to be the most expensive government contract ever in Maryland" and "one of the largest public-private partnerships on a U.S. transportation project" ever. The contract approval allowed the MTA to finalize $900 million in federal construction grants.

In August 2016, U.S. District Court Judge Richard J. Leon vacated the Purple Line's federal approval, ruling that the MTA and the Federal Transit Administration did not properly study whether Metro's maintenance issues and ridership decline would affect the Purple Line. Hogan responded that Leon's residence at the Columbia Country Club, a leading opponent of the line, represented a conflict of interest. A federal funding agreement cannot be signed without the reinstatement of the environmental approval, and Maryland had said it could not afford to build the Purple Line without sufficient federal funding. On August 21, 2017, despite the ongoing court case over the environmental analysis, $900 million of federal funding was granted for the light rail project. On December 19, 2017, the U.S. Court of Appeals for the D.C. Circuit ruled in favor of the Purple Line, stating that declining ridership on the Washington Metro system does not require Maryland to complete a new environmental study for the Purple Line. This federal appeals court ruling allowed for construction to continue and effectively ended the three-year legal battle surrounding the light-rail line project.

In 2019, the Purple Line Transit Partners said the opening date would slip to 2023 or 2024.

On April 13, 2020, U.S. District Judge James Bredar dismissed the third and final lawsuit brought by opponents of the Purple Line.

=== Builder consortium quits ===
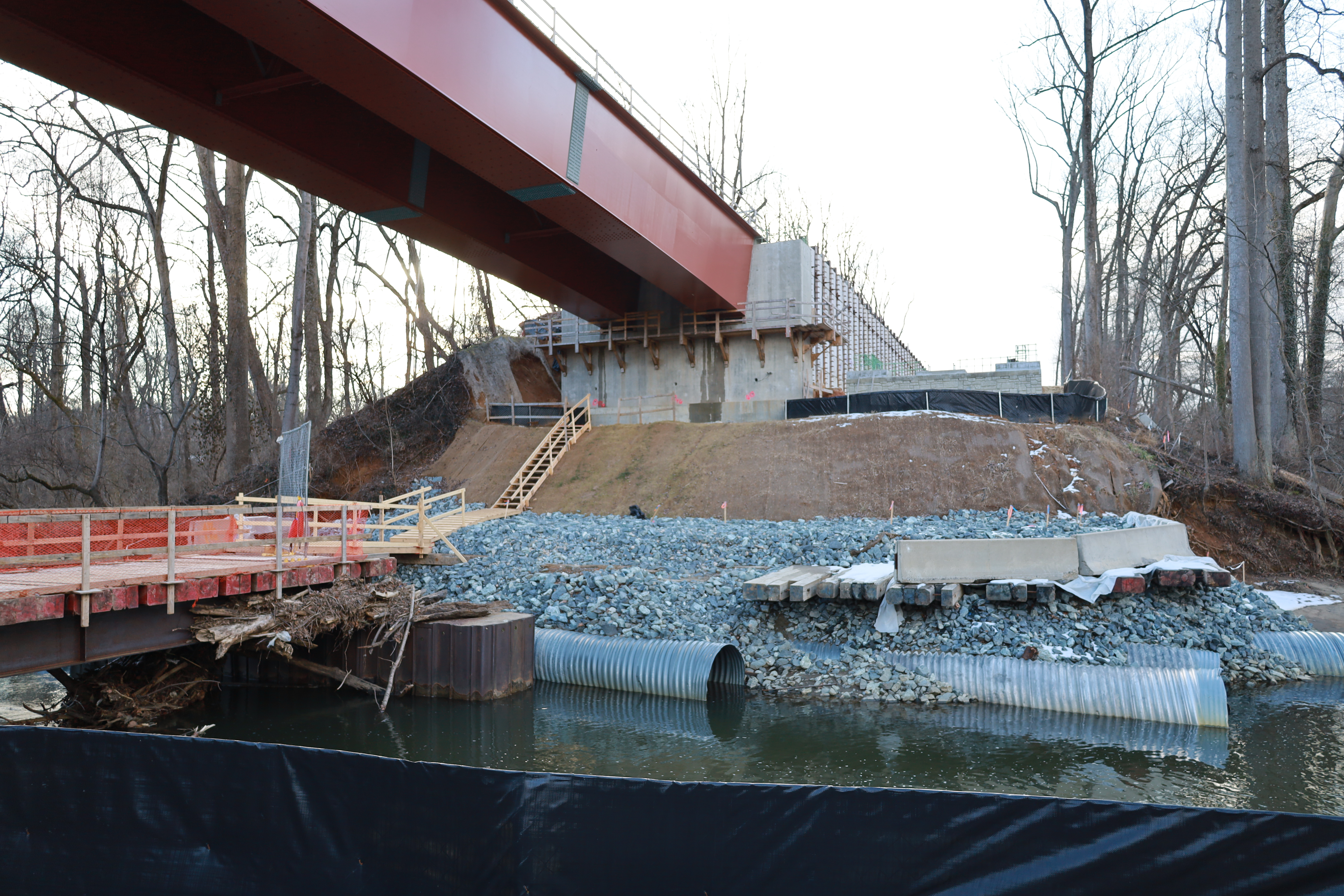
Construction of the Purple Line and Capital Crescent Trail crossings of Rock Creek during the construction pause in February 2021

By 2020, the project had accrued over $800 million in change orders from Purple Line Transit Partners and the opening date had slipped 32 months. On May 1, the consortium declared their intent to cease work on the line and withdraw from their contract. A temporary restraining order halted the company from quitting work, but it was lifted in September, and PLTP began packing up construction sites the following week. In November, MDOT announced that MTA had assumed many of the Purple Line's contracts, including the manufacturing of light-rail cars, operations, and maintenance, as well as design and construction contracts. On November 24, MDOT agreed to pay $250 million to PLTP to settle the costs of overruns, a move approved unanimously in mid-December by Maryland's Board of Public Works (BPW). Officials aimed to restart construction within nine months—i.e., fall 2021.

=== Work resumes ===
On November 5, 2021, Purple Line officials announced that the contract to finish construction would go to Maryland Transit Solutions: a joint venture of Dragados USA and OHL USA, both American subsidiaries of major Spanish construction firms. The contract was ultimately set at $2.3 billion, bringing total construction costs to $3.4 billion, some $1.46 billion over the 2016 plan.

As 2022 opened, state officials said the line would open in fall 2026. The new construction contract was approved by BPW on January 26, 2022, and signed in April 2022. Full-scale construction activity resumed in summer 2022. In June 2022, MTA said that 77% of the necessary utility relocations had been completed, and that the Glenridge Operations and Maintenance Facility was complete and in operation.

In January 2023, the estimated cost to build and operate the line for 36 years was $9.28 billion. In July 2023, MTA officials added $148 million to their construction-costs estimate, pushing the build-and-operate cost to $9.4 billion. The expected opening date was delayed to May 2027, more than five years later than first planned. The officials said the changes were due to the change of contractor, to inflation, and to labor shortages.

In March 2024, MTA officials asked the state's Board of Public Works to approve another $425 million for the project. The extra money would go toward construction costs and also extend the contract to operate the line to 2057. The request would boost the total cost to build and operate the line to about $9.53 billion, about $4 billion over the initial 2016 budget of $5.6 billion. It was the second-largest request for extra funds, after the 2022 addition. They also moved the opening date to late 2027. In December 2024 it was reported that construction of the new mezzanine at the Bethesda station, a complex design, has led to extensive cost overruns. The construction process at Bethesda included extensive blasting operations.

A March 2025 report by the Maryland comptroller's office found that permitting and legal fees for the project, originally budgeted at $6 million, had actually consumed roughly $800 million, thanks to two lawsuits and the contract renegotiations. In September 2025, officials said the Prince George's County portion of the line was finished, while track work in Montgomery County was about 79% done and expected to wrap up in spring 2026. The final 28th rail car was delivered in November 2025. The final section of track was laid in May 2026.

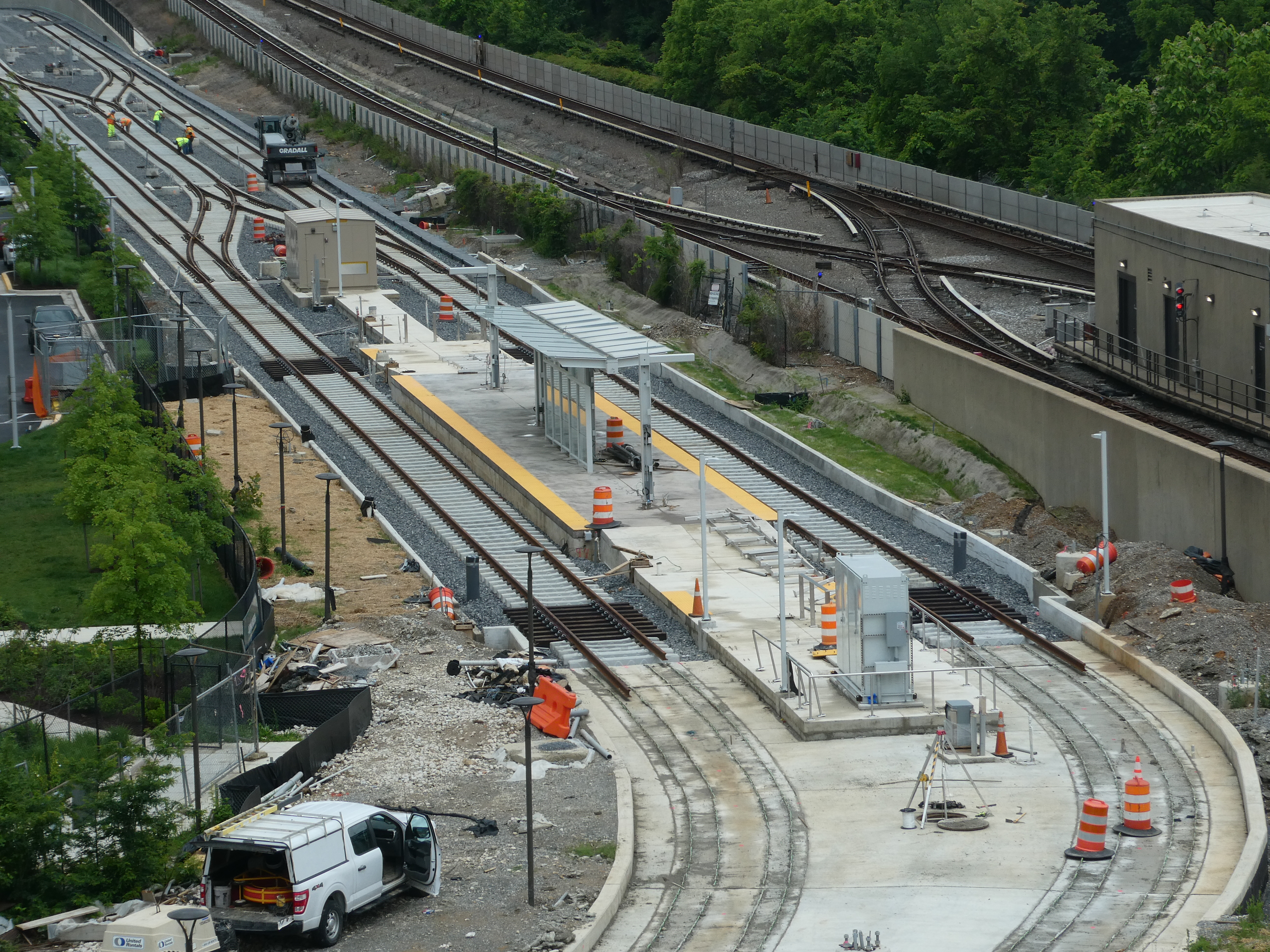
Platform construction at College Park–UMD in May 2025

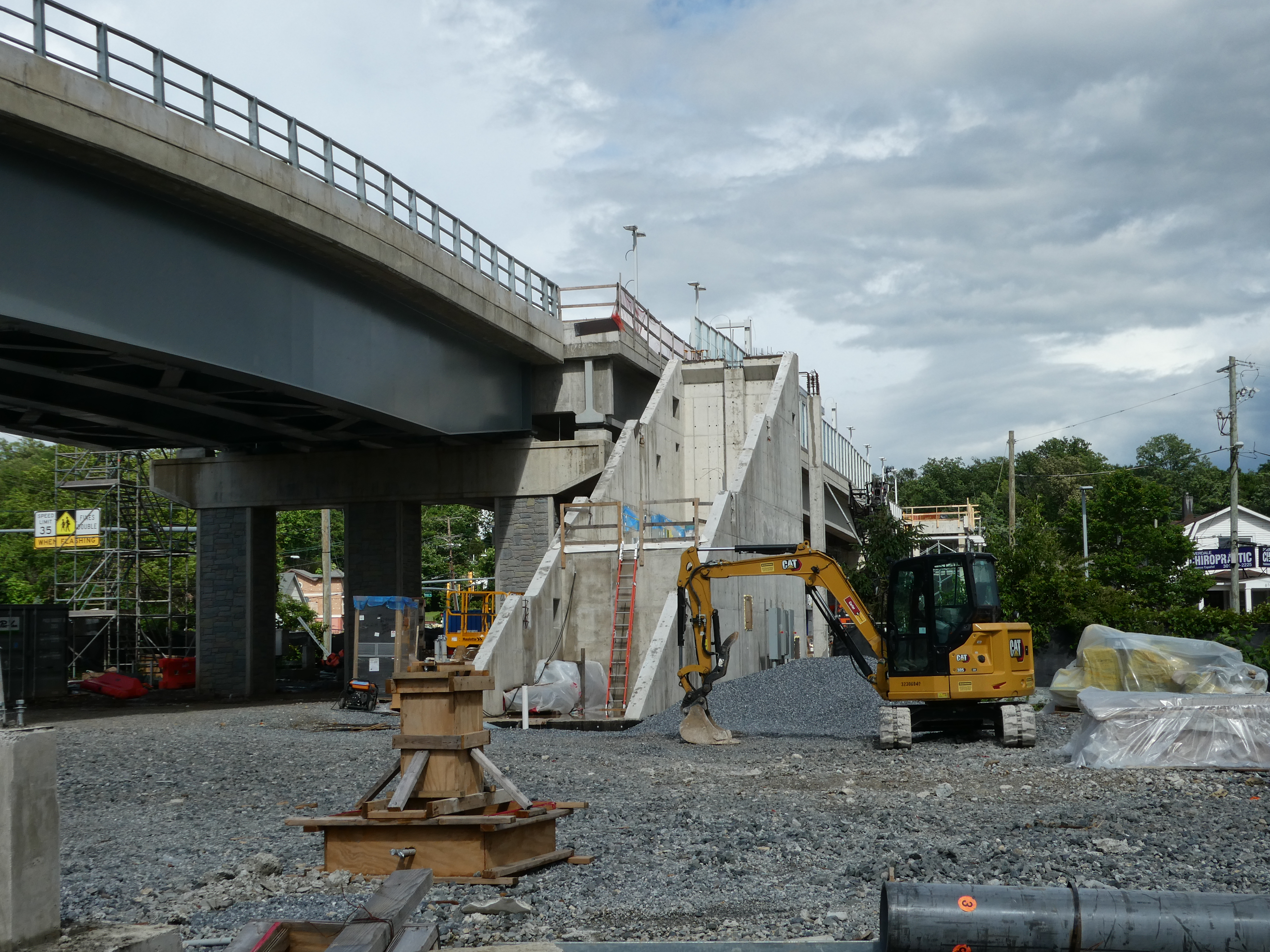
Construction of Riverdale Park–Kenilworth station in May 2025

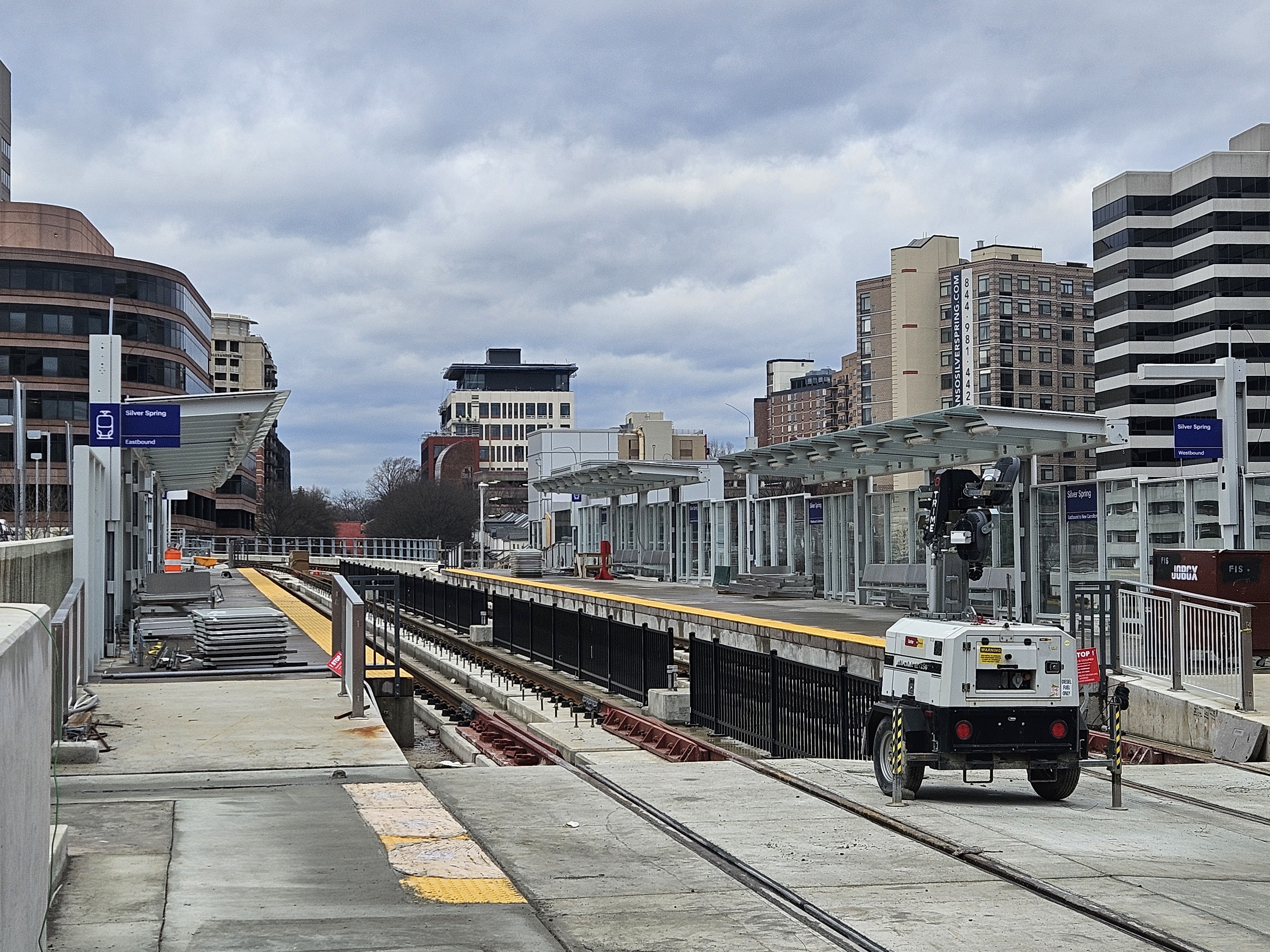
Platform construction at Silver Spring in December 2025

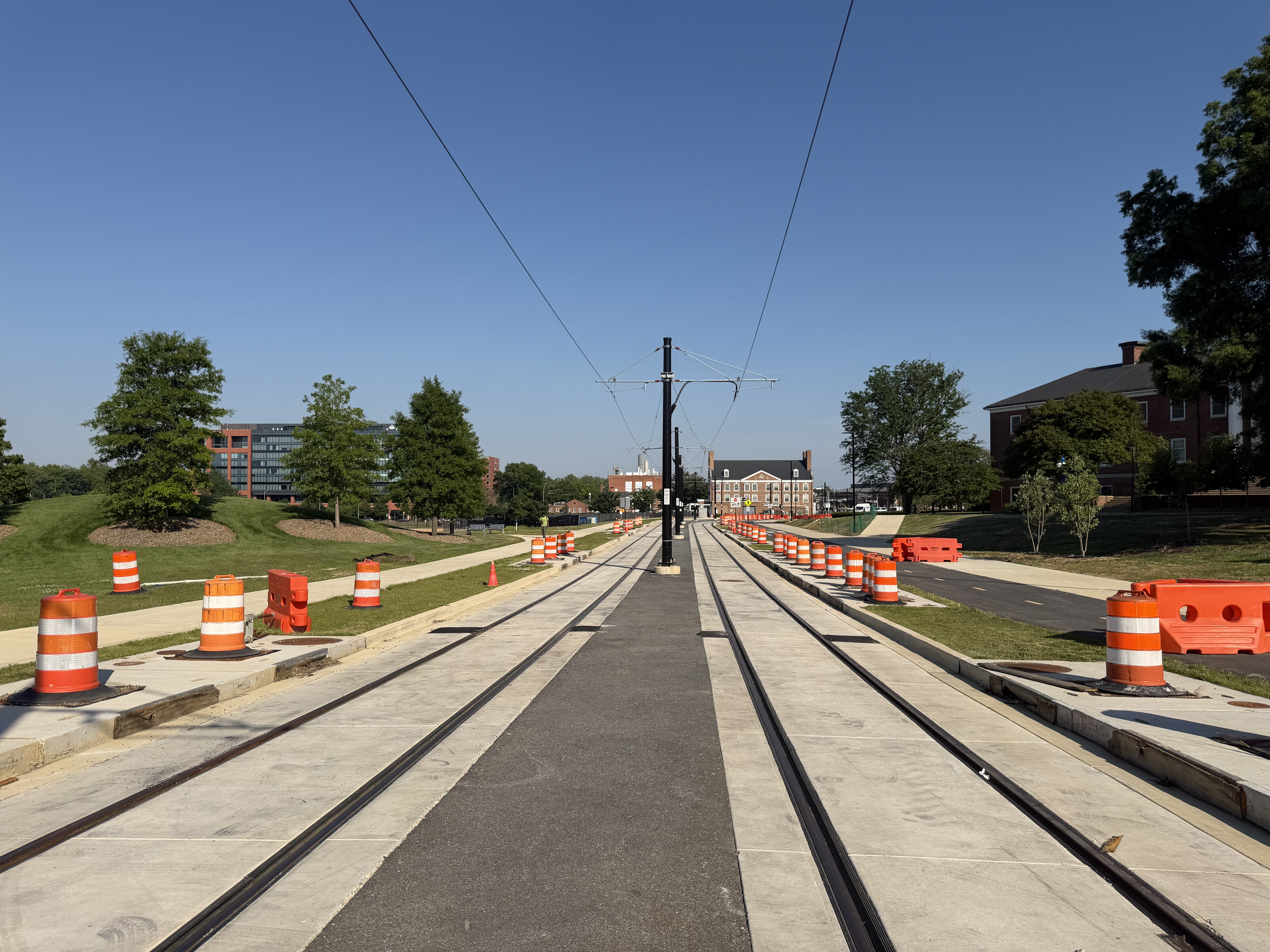
Completed tracks on the UMD campus in May 2026

== Route and station locations ==
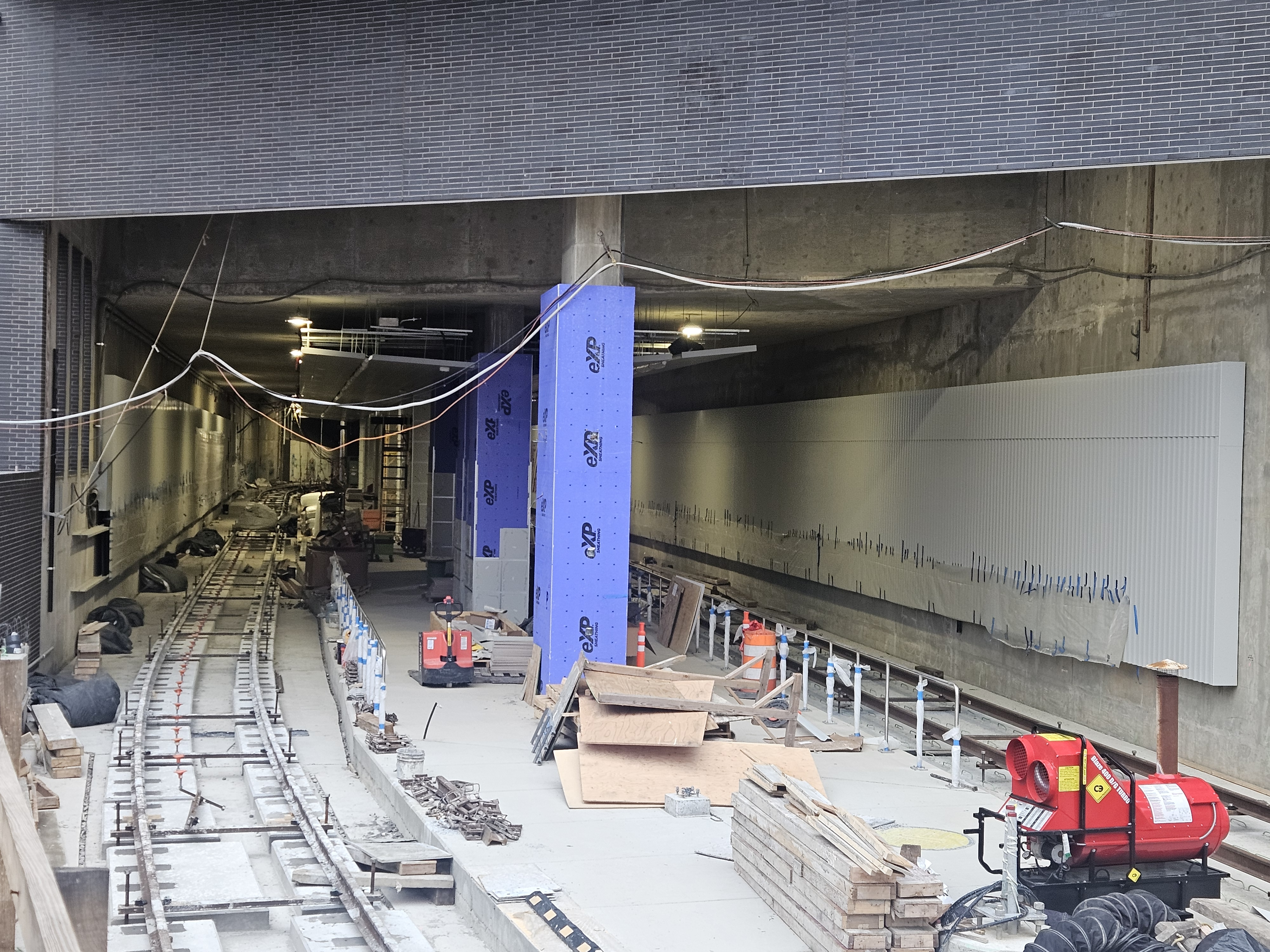
Purple Line construction at Bethesda station in 2025

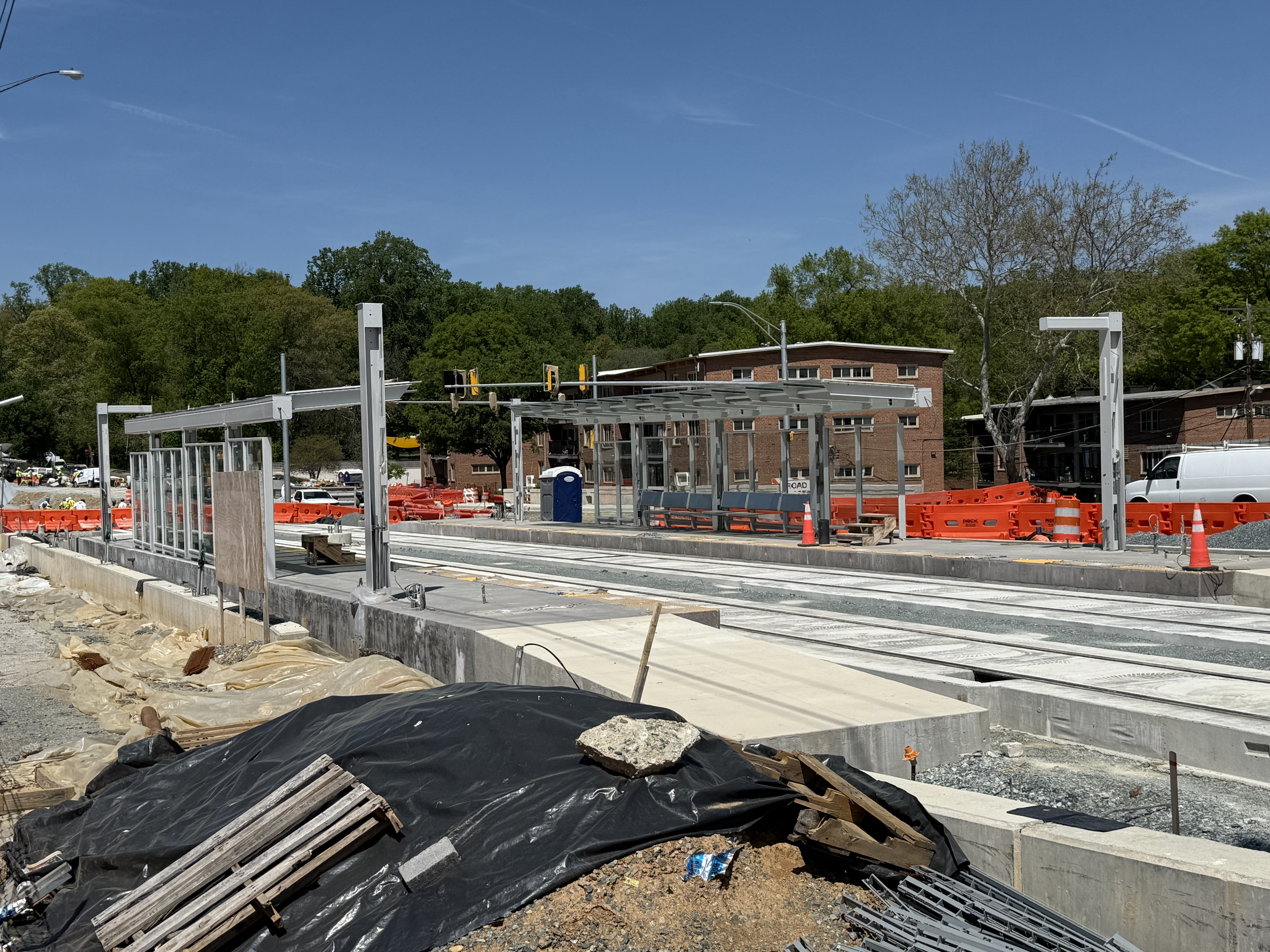
Long Branch, a typical Purple Line station, under construction in 2025

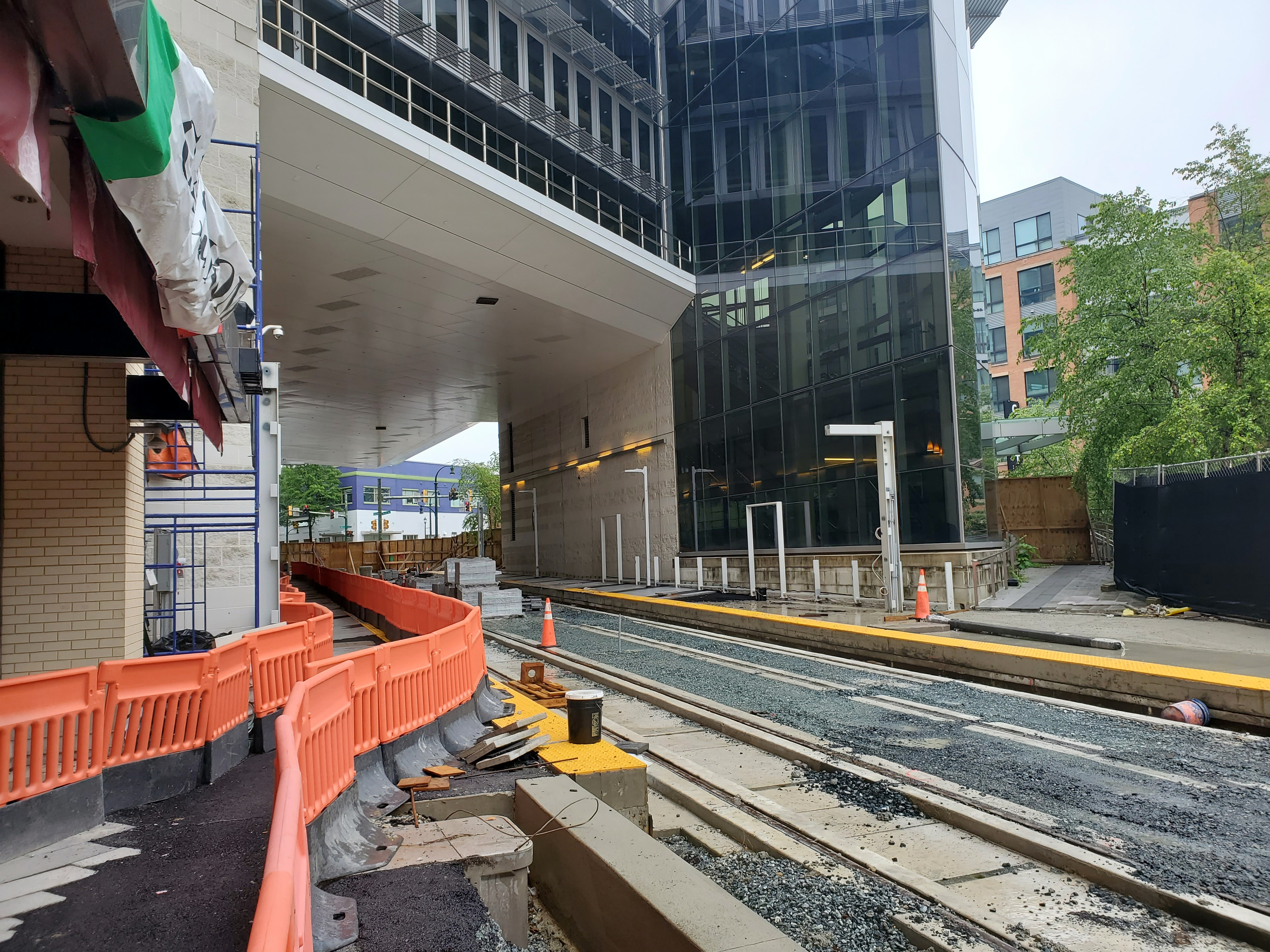
Silver Spring Library station under construction in 2025

The Purple Line will connect four existing Metro, MARC commuter rail, and Amtrak stations:

- Bethesda (Metro Red Line)
- Silver Spring (Metro Red Line, MARC Brunswick Line)
- College Park (Metro Green Line, Metro Yellow Line, MARC Camden Line)
- New Carrollton (Metro Orange Line, Metro Silver Line, MARC Penn Line, Amtrak Northeast Regional, Amtrak Palmetto, Amtrak Vermonter)

The following stations are part of the "Locally Preferred Alternative" route approved by Governor Martin O'Malley on August 9, 2009:

Station	Location	Connections
Bethesda	7450 Wisconsin Avenue; Bethesda, Maryland	Metrorail: Red Line; Metrobus: D96, M22, M70; Ride On: 29, 30, 32, 34, 36, 47, 70; Fairfax Connector: 798; Bethesda Circulator; Capital Crescent Trail
Connecticut Avenue	Capital Crescent Trail & Connecticut Avenue; Chevy Chase, MD 20815	Metrobus: M22
Lyttonsville	Lyttonsville Place, Lyttonsville; Silver Spring, MD 20910	Ride On: 2
16th Street–Woodside	16th Street, Woodside; Silver Spring, MD 20910	Metrobus: M70; Ride On: 1, 2, 11, 18
Silver Spring	8400 Colesville Road; Silver Spring, MD 20910 (Top Level of the Paul Sarbanes Transit Center)	Metrorail: Red Line; MARC Train: Brunswick Line; Metrobus: C87, D40, D4X, D60, D6X, M20, M52, M54, M70, P30; Ride On: 1, 2, 4, 5, 8, 9, 11, 12, 13, 14, 15, 16, 17, 18, 19, 20, 21, 22, 28, Flash BRT (Blue, Orange); MTA Maryland Bus: 915, 929; Shuttle-UM: 111; Peter Pan Bus
Silver Spring Library	900 Wayne Avenue; Silver Spring, MD 20910	Metrobus: P30; Ride On: 15, 16, 17, 19, 20, 28; Shuttle-UM: 111
Dale Drive	Dale Drive & Wayne Avenue; Silver Spring, MD 20910	Ride On: 12, 15, 19
Manchester Place	Wayne Avenue & Plymouth Street; Silver Spring, MD 20910	Ride On: 12, 13, 19
Long Branch	8736 Arliss Street; Silver Spring, MD 20901	Ride On: 14, 15, 16, 20, 24
Piney Branch Road	Piney Branch Road & University Boulevard; Silver Spring, MD 20903	Metrobus: M12; Ride On: 14, 15, 16, 20, 24
Takoma–Langley	7900 New Hampshire Ave; Langley Park, MD	Metrobus: M12, M60, M6X, P31; Ride On: 15, 16, 17, 18, 25; GoPGC: P43; Shuttle-UM: 111
Riggs Road	Riggs Road & University Boulevard; Langley Park/Hyattsville, MD 20903	Metrobus: M12, P15, P16, P31; GoPGC: P43
Adelphi Road–UMGC–UMD	Adelphi Road & Campus Drive; Adelphi/Hyattsville, MD 20903	Metrobus: P31, P32; GoPGC: P37; Shuttle-UM
Campus Drive–UMD	Campus Drive & Library Lane; College Park, MD 20742	Metrobus: P31, P32; GoPGC: P37; Shuttle-UM
Baltimore Avenue–UMD	Baltimore Avenue & Rossborough Lane; College Park, MD 20742	Metrobus: M44, P10, P1X; Shuttle-UM
College Park–UMD	4931 Calvert Road & 7202 Bowdoin Avenue; College Park, Maryland	Metrorail: Yellow Line, Green Line; MARC Train: Camden Line; Metrobus: M42, P10, P14, P31; RTA: 302/G; GoPGC: P37; Shuttle-UM: 104, 109; MTA Maryland: 204
Riverdale Park North–UMD	River Road & Haig Drive; Riverdale Park, MD 20737	Metrobus: P14, P31
Riverdale Park–Kenilworth	East West Highway & Kenilworth Avenue; Riverdale Park, MD 20737	Metrobus: P14, P30, P31, P35, P42
Beacon Heights–East Pines	Riverdale Road & 67th Avenue; Riverdale Park, MD 20737	Metrobus: P30, P31, P35, P42
Glenridge	Veterans Parkway & Annapolis Road; Hyattsville/Landover Hills, MD 20784	Metrobus: P40; GoPGC: P22
New Carrollton	4300–4700 Garden City Drive; New Carrollton, MD	Metrorail: Orange Line, Silver Line; MARC Train: Penn Line; Amtrak: Northeast Regional, Palmetto, Vermonter; Metrobus: P20, P21, P24, P30, P31, P35, P40, P42, P60, P61; MTA Maryland Commuter Bus; GoPGC: P22, P23, P2X, P44, P52, P5X, P71; Greyhound

=== Potential expansion ===
There have been several proposals to expand the 16-mile (28.8-km) line further into Maryland or to mirror the Capital Beltway as a loop around the Washington, D.C., metropolitan area. In 2015, the Sierra Club argued for a Purple Line that would "encircle Washington, D.C." and "connect existing suburban metro lines." Maryland Lieutenant Governor Anthony Brown, while campaigning in 2006, said he would "like to see the Purple Line go from Bethesda to across the Woodrow Wilson Bridge," adding, "Let's swing that boy all the way around”—that is, have the Purple Line circle through Virginia and back to the line's Bethesda terminus.

"The Inner Purple Line Campaign” advocacy group proposed in 2009 that the Purple Line be extended westward to Tysons Corner and eastward to Largo, and that it could eventually cross the new Wilson Bridge from Suitland through Oxon Hill to Alexandria, eventually forming a rail line that encircles the city. The Woodrow Wilson Bridge (I-495's southern crossing over the Potomac River) is built to carry a heavy or light rail line. Suggested stops along this proposed Purple Line expansion include:

- Downtown Largo
- Branch Avenue
- Oxon Hill (potentially near Rosecroft Raceway, at which Metro has at times had plans to build a stop since 1980)
- National Harbor
- Alexandria, potentially the King Street–Old Town Metro station
- Springfield
- Annandale
- Dunn Loring
- Tysons Corner

== Rolling stock ==
The Purple Line will operate Urbos 3 light-rail vehicles made by CAF, a Spanish company. Each of the 28 vehicles has five segments, or modules, and at 140 feet (43 m) long, as of 2024, they were the longest railcars in North America. Each vehicle can carry up to 431 passengers: 80 seated and the rest standing.

CAF began testing the cars in 2020 and finished fabricating all 130 module shells at its facility in Spain in June 2021. They were assembled at the company's facility in Elmira, New York, and hauled on trucks to Maryland. All but two of the 28 trains were assembled as of February 2023.

In April 2025, MTA announced it was beginning to test the light rail vehicles on the one-mile (1.6-kilometer) test track next to the project’s Operations and Maintenance Facility along Veterans Parkway in Glenridge, Maryland. Within seven months, all 28 vehicles were being tested at the facility.
