= Wilder, Vermont =

Census-designated place in Vermont, United States

- Census-designated place
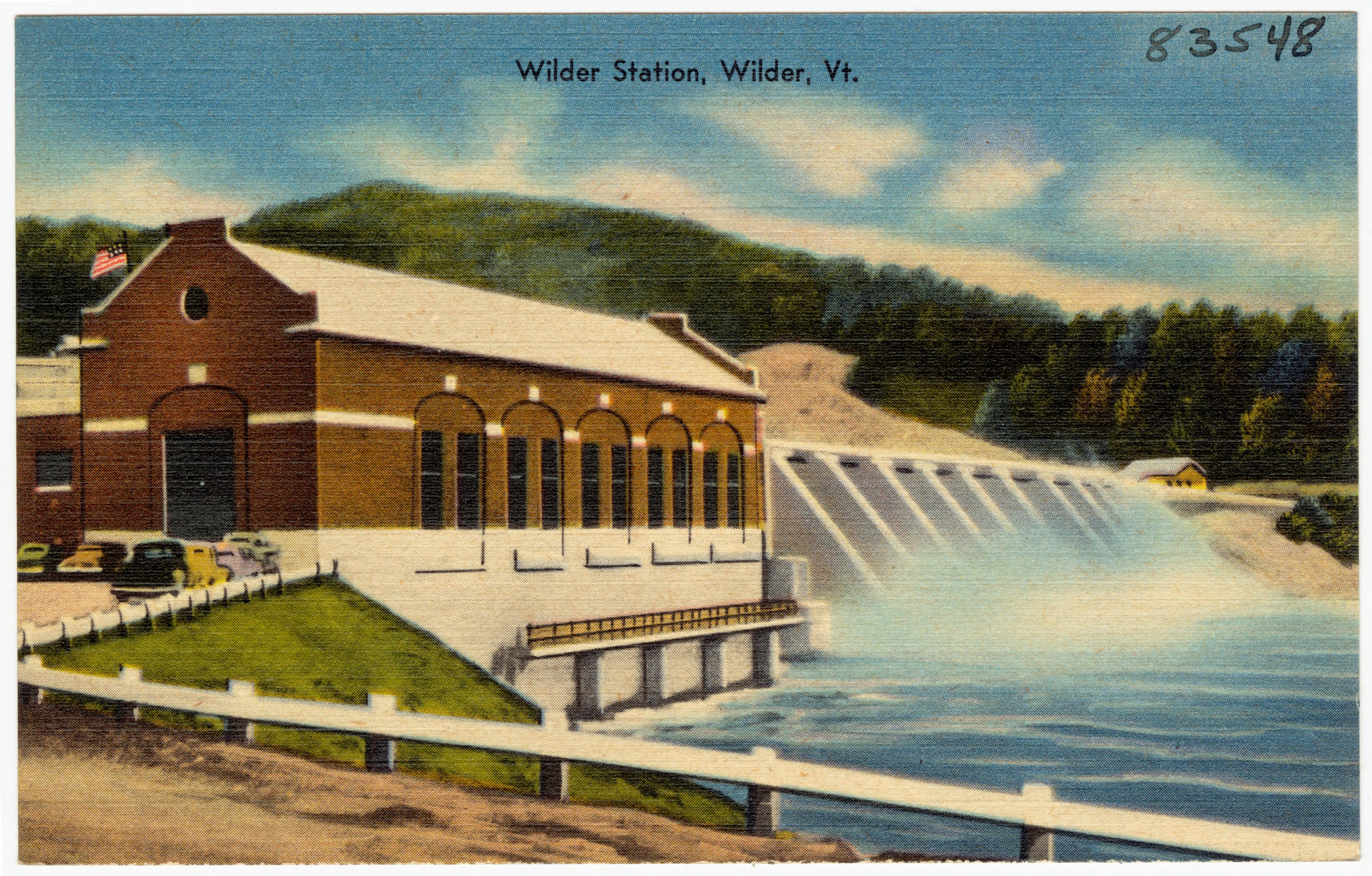
- Wilder Station, Wilder, Vt. (old postcard view)

- Location in Windsor County and the state of Vermont

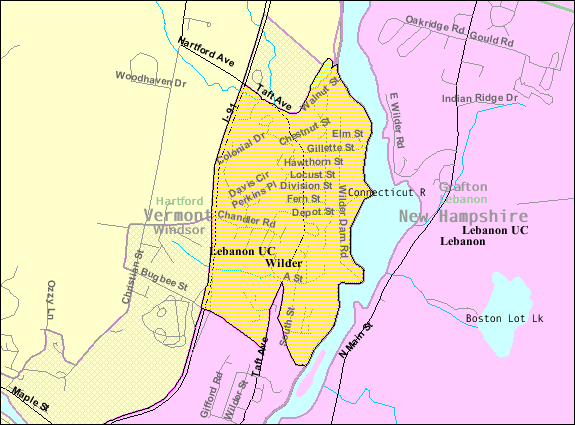
- Detailed map of Wilder, including boundaries of the CDP
- Coordinates: 43°40′26″N 72°18′26″W
- Country: United States
- State: Vermont
- County: Windsor

Area
  - Total: 0.81 sq mi (2.1 km^{2})
  - Land: 0.81 sq mi (2.1 km^{2})
  - Water: 0 sq mi (0.0 km^{2})
- Elevation: 505 ft (154 m)

Population (2010)
  - Total: 1,690
  - Density: 2,100/sq mi (800/km^{2})
- Time zone: UTC-5 (Eastern (EST))
  - Summer (DST): UTC-4 (EDT)
- ZIP Codes: 05088 (Wilder); 05001 (White River Junction)
- Area code: 802
- FIPS code: 50-84025
- GNIS feature ID: 2378351
- Wilder Village Historic District
- U.S. National Register of Historic Places
- U.S. Historic district
- Location within Vermont Location within the United States
- Location: Portions of Norwich, Passumpsic, and Horseshoe Aves., Chestnut, Gillette, Depot, Fern, Hawthorn, Locust and Division Sts., Hartford, Vermont
- Coordinates: 43°40′30″N 72°18′31″W
- Area: 40 acres (16 ha)
- Built: 1880
- Architect: Louis Sheldon Newton; Emily Elizabeth Holman
- Architectural style: Queen Anne, Colonial Revival, et al.
- NRHP reference No.: 99001396
- Added to NRHP: November 22, 1999

Wilder is an unincorporated village and census-designated place (CDP) within the town of Hartford in Windsor County, Vermont, United States. It is the location of the Wilder Dam on the Connecticut River. The population of the CDP was 1,690 at the 2010 census. The village center is an early example of a planned mill community, and was listed on the National Register of Historic Places as the Wilder Village Historic District in 1999.

As of 2025, Wilder has an estimated population of 4,120. The city is experiencing an annual growth rate of 4.09%. Since the 2020 census, which recorded a population of 3,146, Wilder’s population has grown by approximately 30.96%.

== History ==
The village, originally known as Olcott Falls, is unique as an early planned community developed in part by Charles Wilder, owner of a local paper mill in the 1880s. One feature of Wilder's plan was an orderly street plan in which streets were laid out at right angles, with several of the streets named after trees. The village was renamed in honor of Charles Wilder in 1897.

As of the earliest years of the 20th century, the local paper mill was operated by International Paper and Wilder boasted a railroad station, a post office, several retail stores, and electric street lighting. An iron bridge contributed by Charles Wilder spanned the Connecticut River at Wilder. The bridge, the paper mill, and the dam that supplied power to the mill were all demolished in 1950 for the construction of Wilder Dam.

The Wilder Village Historic District was listed on the National Register of Historic Places in 1999. The district covers 40 acres (0.16 km^{2}) and contains 203 contributing resources. It includes examples of Queen Anne and Colonial Revival style architecture with houses dating from the late 19th century to the 1950s. It encompasses the main surviving portions of Wilder's planned community, and is roughly bounded on the north by Chestnut Street, the east by Passumpsic Avenue, the south by Horseshoe Avenue, and the west by Hartford Avenue (United States Route 5). This area is largely residential, with only a few commercial buildings and the local public library among the exceptions.

== Geography ==
Wilder is adjacent to the Connecticut River and immediately north of the village of White River Junction. The CDP is bounded on the west by Interstate 91. According to the United States Census Bureau, the CDP has a total area of 2.1 km^{2} (0.81 sq mi), of which 2.1 km^{2} (0.81 sq mi) is land and 1.22% is water.

== Demographics ==
As of the census of 2000, there were 1,636 people, 690 households, and 445 families residing in the CDP. The population density was 2,003.4/mi^{2} (773.5/km^{2}). There were 710 housing units at an average density of 869.5 units per square mile (335.7 units/km^{2}). The racial makeup of the CDP was 96.64% White, 0.37% African American, 0.55% Native American, 0.92% Asian, 0.12% Pacific Islander, 0.18% from other races, and 1.22% from two or more races. Hispanic or Latino of any race were 0.92% of the population.

There were 690 households, out of which 32.2% had children under the age of 18 living with them, 51.3% were married couples living together, 10.4% had a female householder with no husband present, and 35.5% were non-families. 29.7% of all households were made up of individuals, and 11.0% had someone living alone who was 65 years of age or older. The average household size was 2.37 and the average family size was 2.93.

In the CDP, the population was spread out, with 25.7% under the age of 18, 5.0% from 18 to 24, 32.3% from 25 to 44, 25.3% from 45 to 64, and 11.8% who were 65 years of age or older. The median age was 38 years. For every 100 females, there were 94.3 males. For every 100 females age 18 and over, there were 87.7 males.

The median income for a household in the CDP was $40,238, and the median income for a family was $55,000. Males had a median income of $35,833 versus $28,250 for females. The per capita income for the CDP was $21,802. About 4.5% of families and 7.4% of the population were below the poverty line, including 4.5% of those under age 18 and 4.3% of those age 65 or over.
