= National Park Seminary =

Historic district in Maryland, United States

- National Park Seminary Historic District
- U.S. National Register of Historic Places
- U.S. Historic district
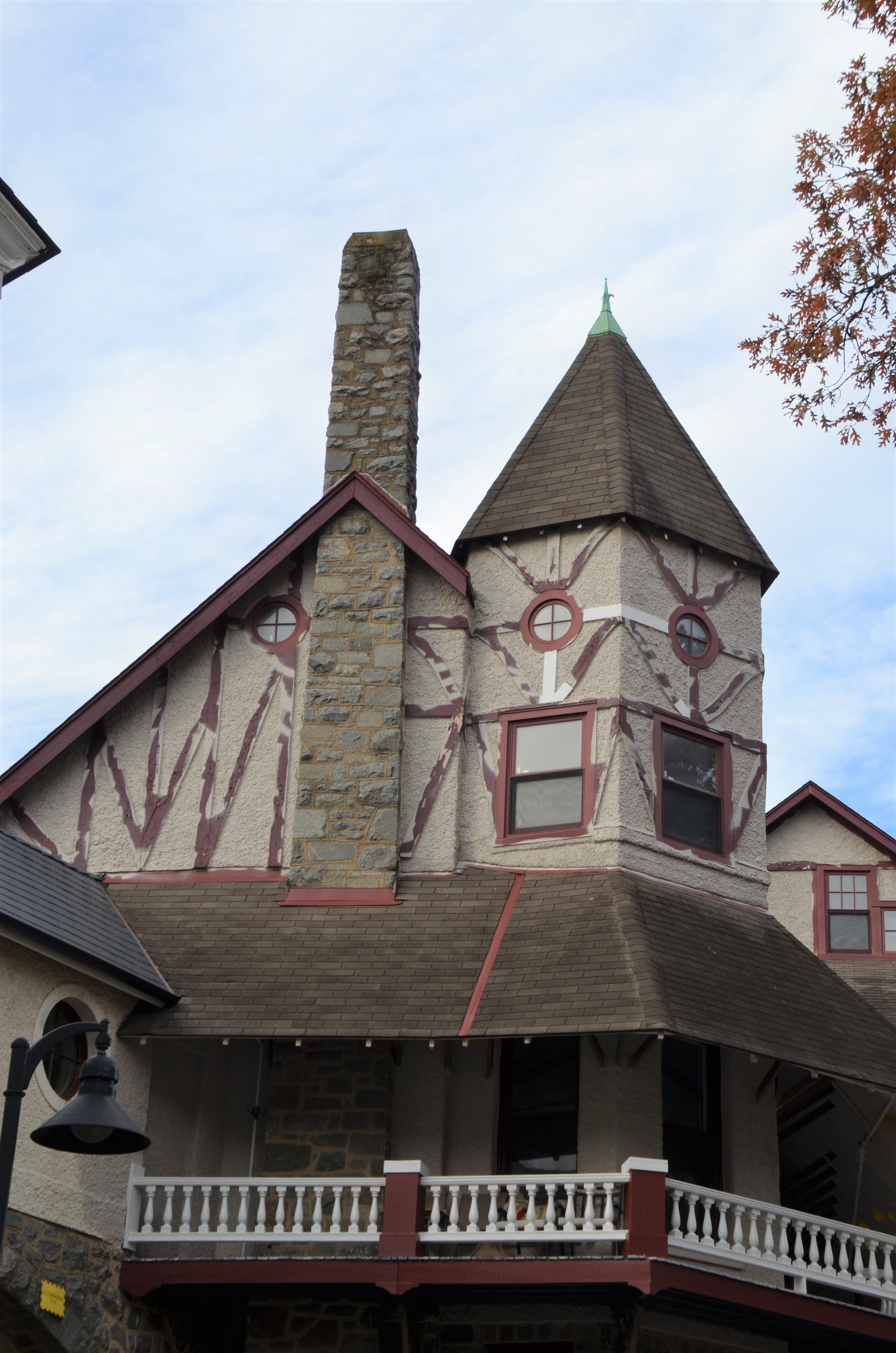
- National Park Seminary Building

- Location within Maryland Location within the United States
- Location: Linden Lane near I-495, Forest Glen Park, Maryland
- Coordinates: 39°00′43″N 77°03′21″W
- Area: 23 acres (9.3 ha)
- Built: 1890
- Architect: Emily Elizabeth Holman
- Architectural style: Late 19th and early 20th century American movements, late 19th and 20th century revivals, Greek revival
- NRHP reference No.: 72000586
- Added to NRHP: September 14, 1972

National Park Seminary, later renamed National Park College, was an elite, private, nonsectarian women’s boarding and finishing school that operated from 1894 until 1942 in Forest Glen Park, Maryland. Its name alludes to nearby Rock Creek Park. The school was renowned for its highly eclectic, international architecture and rigorous lifestyle preparation. In the early 21st century the historic campus is being preserved as the center of a new housing development.

== History ==
=== Origin ===
The land that became National Park Seminary was originally the ancestral territory of the Piscataway (Conoy), who managed and stewarded the region collectively without concepts of individualized real property.

Following European colonization, the land originated under the Maryland proprietary system established by Cecil Calvert (Lord Baltimore) and was acquired by the colonial governor before passing to the Carroll family. The tract was divided and resold through colonial patents issued in the late 1600s, becoming part of the broader Forest Glen estate region associated in the 1700s with Daniel Carroll, a Founding Father who signed both the Articles of Confederation and the United States Constitution.

=== Ye Forest Inn ===
The historic parcels were eventually assembled in 1887 by the Forest Glen Improvement Company, which developed the site into a resort hotel known as Ye Forest Inn, a summer vacation retreat for Washington, D.C., residents. Following the resort's financial failure.

The property was leased to John Irving Cassedy and Vesta Harvey Cassedy, whom later purchased the former resort hotel Ye Forest Inn in Maryland, which redeveloped it into a finishing school for young women.

=== National Park Seminary ===
John Irving Cassedy and Vesta Harvey Cassedy were Ohio-born educators who earned bachelor’s and master’s degrees from Ohio Wesleyan University. They began their teaching careers at Lasell Seminary in Massachusetts, a private women’s school, where they taught a curriculum that combined academic subjects such as languages, history, and science with instruction in music, art, and domestic sciences After working in women’s education and boarding-school administration, the Cassedys accumulated savings through several years of teaching and administrative positions at private seminaries.

National Park Seminary officially opened its doors on the last Thursday of September 1894 with an inaugural class of 48 female students. Under the leadership of the Cassedys, the seminary quickly gained a reputation as a highly progressive yet prestigious residential school.

To accommodate the expanding student body, which grew significantly from its original 48 students, the campus was expanded with a unique network of covered walkways connecting the dormitories and academic halls. The founders structured the school's daily administration around a close-knit academic community, a system later supported by members of the administration such as Assistant Dean Miss Edna Roeckel.

From the late 1890s through the early 1910s, National Park Seminary expanded into a successful private women’s boarding school and finishing school. Enrollment grew from several dozen students in its early phase to approximately 50 to 150 students at peak capacity. The institution generated revenue primarily through annual tuition and boarding fees typical of elite schools of the period, estimated at $300 to $600 per student each year depending on instruction in languages, music, arts, and residential arrangements. This produced an approximate annual institutional revenue of $15,000 to $90,000 (equivalent to $450,000–$2,700,000 today), allowing the school to maintain modest operating surpluses. These funds were consistently reinvested into faculty salaries, dormitory-style student housing, dining services, and the gradual development of the campus’s distinctive themed architecture and specialized educational programs.

=== Buildings ===
The National Park Seminary's "architectural fantasy" campus was partly shaped by architect Emily Elizabeth Holman, who operated under the professional name "E. E. Holman" in late 19th-century Philadelphia. Following early training in established architectural offices, she went on to launch her own independent practice in the city. To complement the campus's eclectic aesthetic, most of the core buildings within the central seminary complex were interconnected indoors and via roofed, weather-sheltered balconies. This distinctive structural design allowed students and faculty to transit freely throughout the main campus facilities, remaining protected from the winter cold and rainy weather without needing to step outdoors.

Conversely, the school's highly recognized, themed sorority clubhouses—such as the Dutch windmill, Spanish Mission, and Japanese pagoda—were constructed adjacent to the main complex as standalone structures and were not part of this interconnected walkway system. These buildings were expressions of Holman's signature focus on "picturesque cottages" and incorporated design input from the seminary's own students, contributing significantly to the school's whimsical, fairytale, and dreamlike atmosphere.

At the time of construction, formal architectural licensing in the United States was not yet standardized across most states, with professional practice generally relying on apprenticeship, field experience, and portfolio work.

Major buildings and structures of National Park Seminary
Year completed	Building or structure	Architectural style	Original function / purpose	Status today
1894	Main Building (converted from the 1887 resort hotel)	Queen Anne / Victorian	Administration offices, classrooms, dining facilities, and dormitories; center of campus life	Survives, heavily modified
c. 1897	Library rooms (within Main Building)	Victorian interior	Library and study space	Incorporated into Main Building
1898	Aloha Cottage	Hawaiian-inspired vernacular	Residence of John and Vesta Cassedy; later student housing	Survives
1898	Senior House	Colonial Revival	Student dormitory	Survives, modified
1900	Practice House	Colonial Revival	Individual music practice rooms for students	Survives
1901	Miller Library	Classical Revival	Main library and study building	Survives
1901	Gymnasium	Institutional Colonial Revival	Physical education facility including swimming pool, bowling alley, basketball court, and solarium	Survives
1901	Japanese House	Japanese architecture	Literary society house and student gathering space	Survives
1903	Swiss Chalet	Swiss chalet style	Literary society house and meetings	Survives
1903	Dutch Windmill House	Dutch Revival	Literary society house and social events	Survives
1904	English Castle Cottage	Medieval Revival	Literary society activities and meetings	Survives
1904	Alpine Cottage	Alpine / Swiss Revival	Literary society house and gatherings	Survives
1905	Spanish Mission House	Mission Revival	Literary society headquarters and cultural activities	Survives
1905	Italian Villa	Italian Renaissance Revival	Literary society meetings and social functions	Survives
1906	Colonial House	Colonial Revival	Literary society gatherings and events	Survives
1907	Music Hall	Classical Revival	Music instruction, rehearsals, and recitals	Partially preserved
1907	Pagoda	Japanese-inspired pavilion	Outdoor receptions, performances, and social gatherings	Survives
1908	Stone Hall	Tudor Revival	Student residence hall	Survives
1908–1909	President’s House	Colonial Revival	Residence of the school president	Survives
1910	Odeon Theater	Classical Greek Revival	Open-air performances, concerts, and commencement ceremonies	Survives
1910–1912	Senior Annex	Colonial Revival	Expanded dormitory accommodations	Survives, altered
1910–1916	Dormitory Villas	Eclectic Revival styles	Additional student housing	Some survive
1927	Ament Hall	Colonial Revival	Ballroom, assemblies, dances, and commencement events	Survives
Various	Bronze lions (gate monuments)	Beaux-Arts sculpture	Decorative gatehouse monuments	Survive
Various	Bronze fish, horses, sirens, and eagles	Decorative sculpture	Landscape ornamentation	Survive

=== Aloha House ===
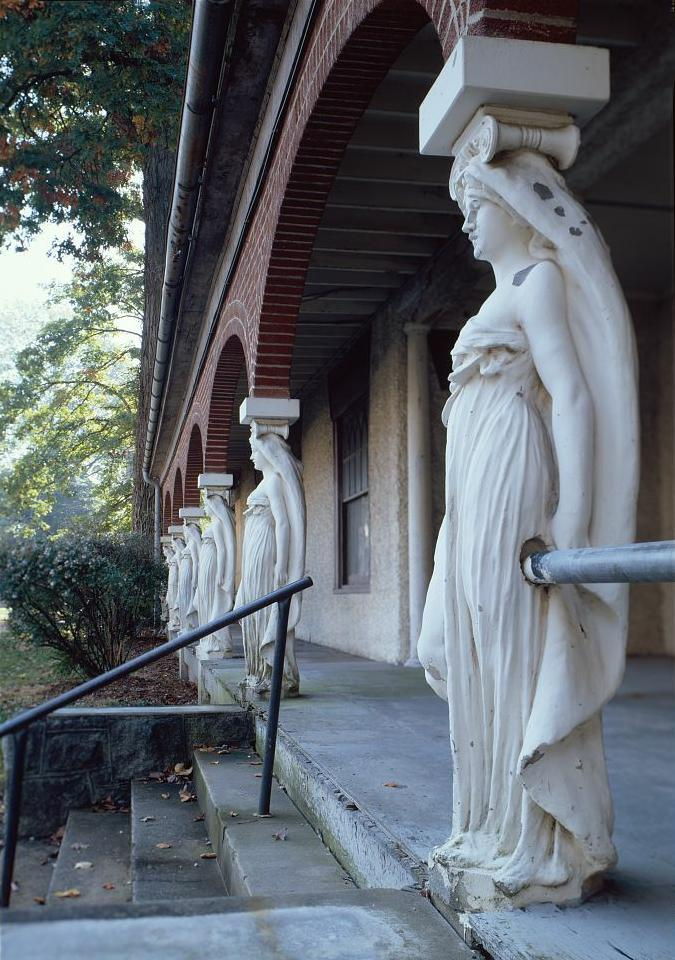
Aloha House

Built in 1898 during the school's initial building campaign, Aloha House began as a modest, freestanding, wood-shingled bungalow that embodied the early, quaint domestic character of the National Park Seminary. Over the next two decades, the building underwent massive, ostentatious additions, transforming it into a rambling, multi-story stucco estate featuring dramatic brick arches and a prominent loggia arcade. Architecturally, its most striking feature is a covered breezeway flanked by ten distinct, Art Nouveau-style cast stone caryatid statues—sculpted maidens that physically support the porch infrastructure.

Originally was constructed to serve as the private campus residence for the seminary's founder and president, John Cassedy, and his wife Vesta (the school's principal), the home was later converted into a premium dormitory for junior-level students. To shield the young women from inclement weather, Aloha House was seamlessly integrated into the campus infrastructure via an extensive network of covered walkways and enclosed bridges connecting it directly to the Main Building. The estate functioned as a high-end residential hub where students practiced daily recitations and hosted elegant "At-Home" gatherings, serving as an immersive training ground for contemporary social graces.

The army acquired the building in 1942, following World War II, the property suffered from more than twenty-five years of severe abandonment and structural decay, during which the historical elements faced immense weathering. The complex was ultimately saved by a $150 million public-private redevelopment initiative; as part of this effort, historical preservationists meticulously restored the building's iconic maiden statues, successfully transitioning Aloha House into a unique, multi-unit residential condominium.

=== Recitation Rooms (c. 1890s–1900s) ===
Recitation rooms were small instructional spaces used for daily academic exercises, oral examinations, and student presentations. Instruction in these rooms typically involved memorization, reading aloud, language practice, and formal recitations as part of the school’s structured curriculum. The rooms were an important component of classroom instruction at National Park Seminary, particularly during its early period as a women’s finishing and boarding school.

=== Practice House (1900) ===
The Practice House was constructed in 1900 as a dedicated facility for music practice and instruction. It was designed as a series of isolated practice rooms intended to minimize sound transmission, allowing students to rehearse individually without disturbing others. The space was used to prepare students for formal performances in the Music Hall and other campus venues, supporting the school’s broader music education program.

=== Gymnasium (1901) ===
The gymnasium was completed in 1901 as a multi-level athletic facility for physical education and recreation. The basement level contained a swimming pool, the second level included a bowling alley and basketball court, and the upper level featured a solarium used for indoor recreation. The building reflects the emphasis on physical training and student health in early 20th-century women’s education.

=== Music Hall / Conservatory (1907) ===
The Music Hall, sometimes described as a conservatory building, was constructed in 1907 to support formal music instruction and performance. It contained rehearsal spaces and rooms used for recitals and structured musical training. The building expanded the school’s music curriculum beyond the earlier Practice House facilities.

=== President’s House (c. 1908–1909) ===
The President’s House was constructed as the residence of the school’s president and administrative head. Built in the Colonial Revival style, it served both as a private residence and a venue for formal receptions and institutional functions. The building reflects the residential and campus-oriented character of National Park Seminary during its period as a private women’s school.

=== Odeon Theater (1910) ===
The Odeon Theater was constructed in 1910 as an open-air performance space used for concerts, theatrical productions, and commencement ceremonies. Designed in a classical revival style, it functioned as one of the primary venues for large public gatherings and cultural events on campus.

=== Ballroom (Ament Hall precursor / later social hall, c. 1927 for Ament Hall)) ===
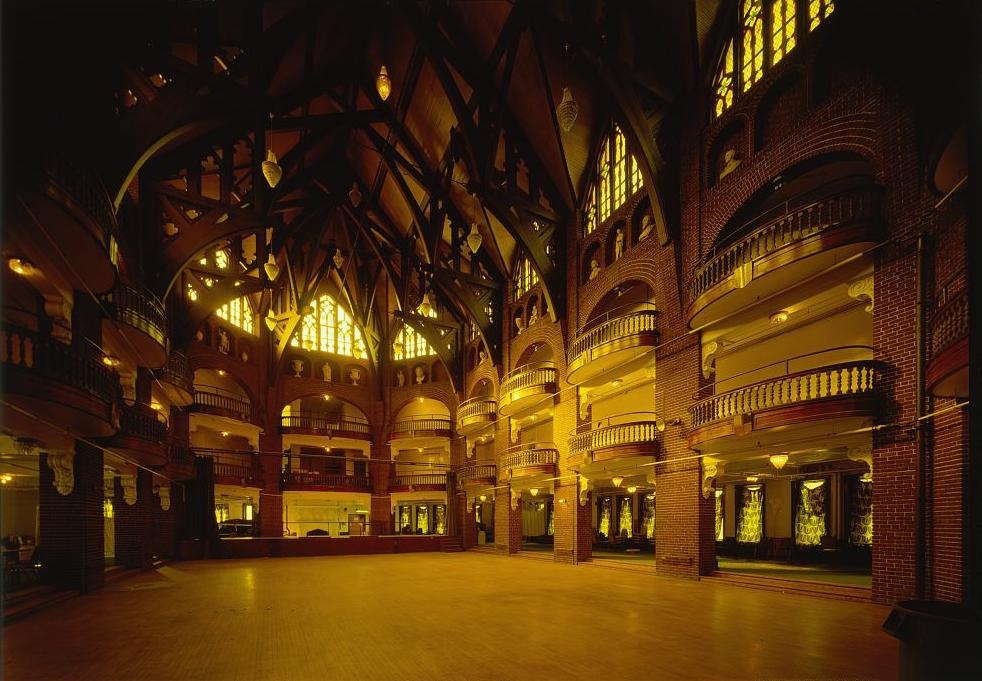

Completed in 1927 under the personal guidance of the school's second president, Dr. James Ament, Ament Hall brought a formal, grand ballroom space to the National Park Seminary campus. Moving away from the campus's earlier Classical Revival or Beaux-Arts exteriors, the interior was executed in a breathtaking Gothic Revival fantasy style. The structure was built as a soaring, timber-trussed, cathedral-like hall complete with stained-glass clerestory windows, massive crystal chandeliers, and painted mural scenes decorating the gallery balcony walls. At the time of its completion, the towering building stood as the tallest structure in Montgomery County.

The Ballroom functioned as the premier social center for the finishing school, specifically designed as a central venue to cultivate contemporary social graces through recreation and institutional events. It became a popular campus hub for formal dances, massive student celebrations, grand assemblies, and commencement exercises. To maximize its utility for daily student life and social gatherings, the space was outfitted with a top-of-the-line, theater-sized Orthophonic speaker sound system, allowing the young women to dance, socialize, and listen to recorded music in an immersive environment.

After 1942 the cavernous ballroom became a recreation and recovery hall for recuperating soldiers. After surviving decades of post-war neglect, abandonment, and severe vandalism, the grand interior space was completely saved from destruction. Through a massive historical rehabilitation project, Ament Hall was fully revitalized and now serves as an active, preserved community amenity room for the site's neighborhood residents

=== Clubs and sororities ===
As National Park Seminary expanded and enrollment increased, additional student societies and sororities were established to accommodate a growing student body. The school’s financial growth supported the development of new campus buildings associated with these organizations. These clubhouses were built as decorative "follies." Because these small structures were built quickly within a single season, they were finished much faster than a standard large building.

Each sorority was assigned a themed house, often inspired by different national or cultural architectural styles. Students participated in aspects of the conceptual design process, while the buildings were designed and executed by architects. The sororities were expected to reflect the cultural themes of their assigned houses in their activities, traditions, and social functions.

==== The mouse house ====
The “Mouse House” was one of the earliest groups in the school private reading club reportedly located on the campus grounds. The club was co-founded by Vesta Harvey Cassedy and functioned as a small, informal literary society focused on reading and discussion.

As enrollment at the school increased, the limited size of the original club meant that not all students could be included. The exclusivity of the group contributed to the creation of additional student societies and sororities, which expanded opportunities for participation in campus literary and social life. These organizations became an established feature of the school’s student culture.

=== American Bungalow ===
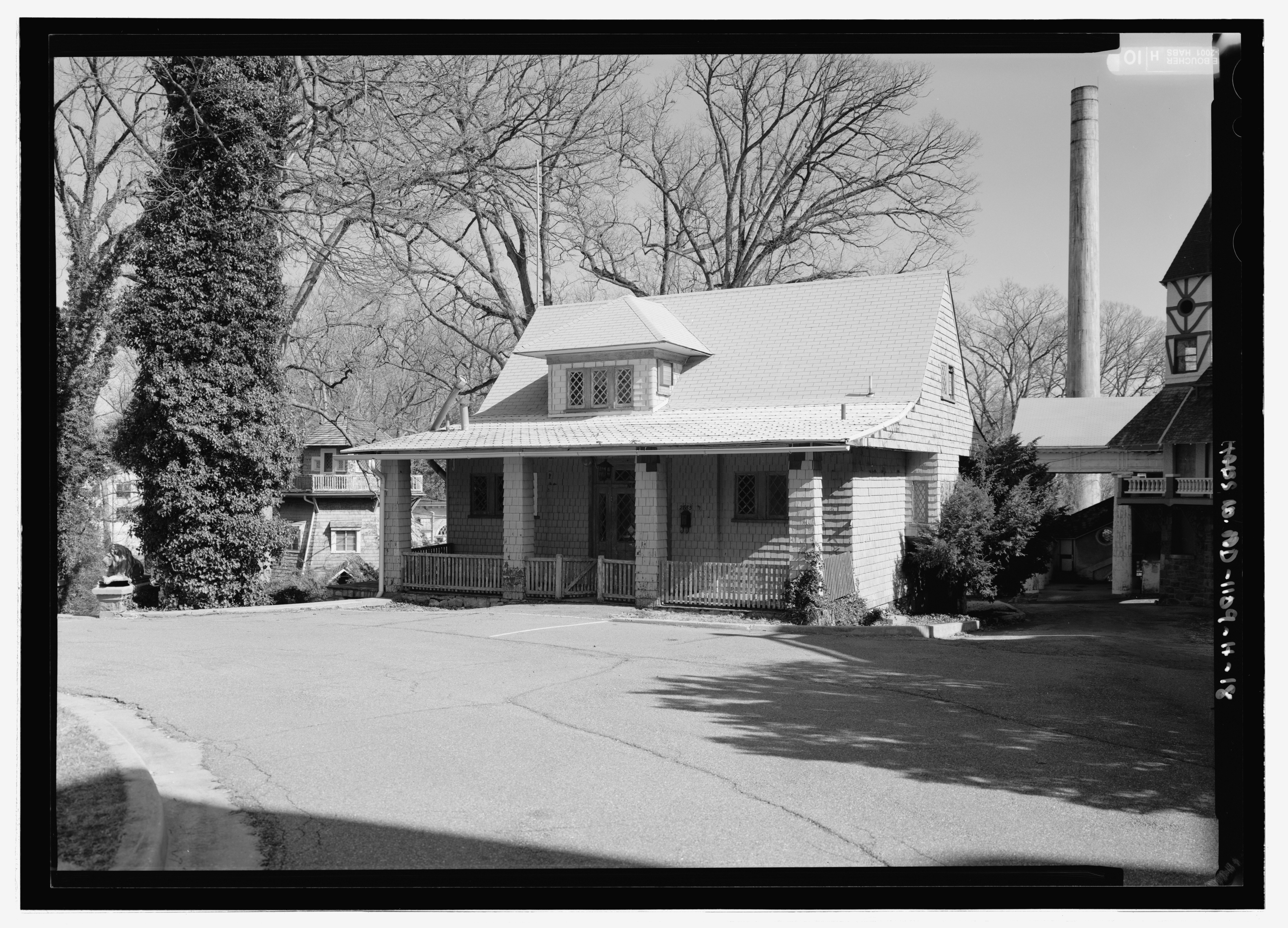
Alpha Epsilon Pi Sorority clubhouse

Built in 1896, the American Bungalow was designed by pioneering female architect Emily Elizabeth Holman, who utilized native oak trees sourced directly from the campus site to craft its foundational structure. Standing as the very first of the National Park Seminary's eight themed clubhouses, this early Arts and Crafts style pavilion—frequently referred to as the "Alpha House" or "Alpha Bungalow"—set a eclectic architectural precedent for the entire Forest Glen campus.

The interior was specifically outfitted to operate as an exclusive, private social hub for the young women of the Alpha Epsilon Pi sorority. Rather than serving as living quarters, the bungalow functioned as an intimate gathering space where student members and faculty advisors convened for formal initiations, academic literary circles, and traditional tea ceremonies. These gatherings were carefully woven into the school's finishing curriculum to instill contemporary social graces and foster deep communal bonds.

Following the United States Army's acquisition of the property in 1942, the bungalow's student-centric functions ceased as the entire campus transitioned into a military medical rehabilitation facility. After weathering decades of post-war abandonment and severe environmental neglect, the structure was successfully stabilized and saved. Through a detailed historic rehabilitation project, the landmark was ultimately preserved and converted into a private, single-family residence.

==== Swiss Chalet (c. 1899) ====
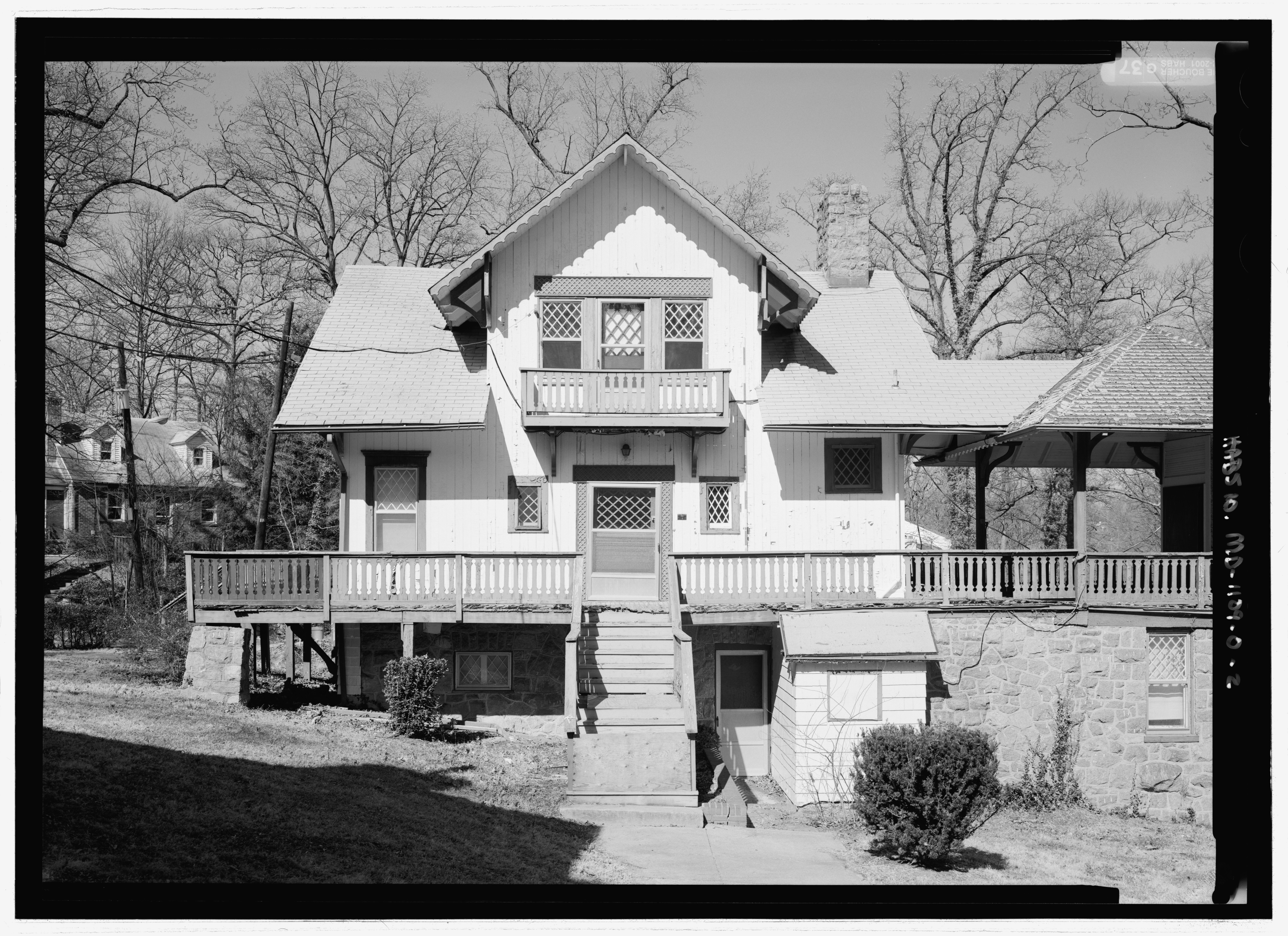
Zeta Eta Theta Sorority clubhouse

The construction of the Swiss Chalet was done in 1899. It was constructed as part of the National Park Seminary's themed club system, serving as a clubhouse for the Zeta Eta Theta and Phi Delta Psi sororities. To ensure architectural authenticity, the school's founders reportedly submitted the design blueprints to the Swiss Legation in Washington, D.C., for approval. The exterior featured signature European alpine design elements, including a scallop-trimmed roof, decorative balconies, and intricate exterior woodwork.

The interior of the building served as a central venue for academic meetings, formal social gatherings, and sorority initiation ceremonies. The primary gathering space featured a massive, carved fireplace wall and a wide open atrium that connected the lower and upper levels. This layout was designed to foster an intimate, immersive communal environment for the student members.

It was converted during the Army's wartime takeover, the structure was used as medical housing. modified the chalet, boarding over the central atrium to convert the space into quarters for military physicians. Following decades of post-war neglect and severe decay, the structure was eventually stabilized. It underwent a comprehensive historical rehabilitation and now functions as a private, single-family residence.

==== Japanese House (c. 1901) ====
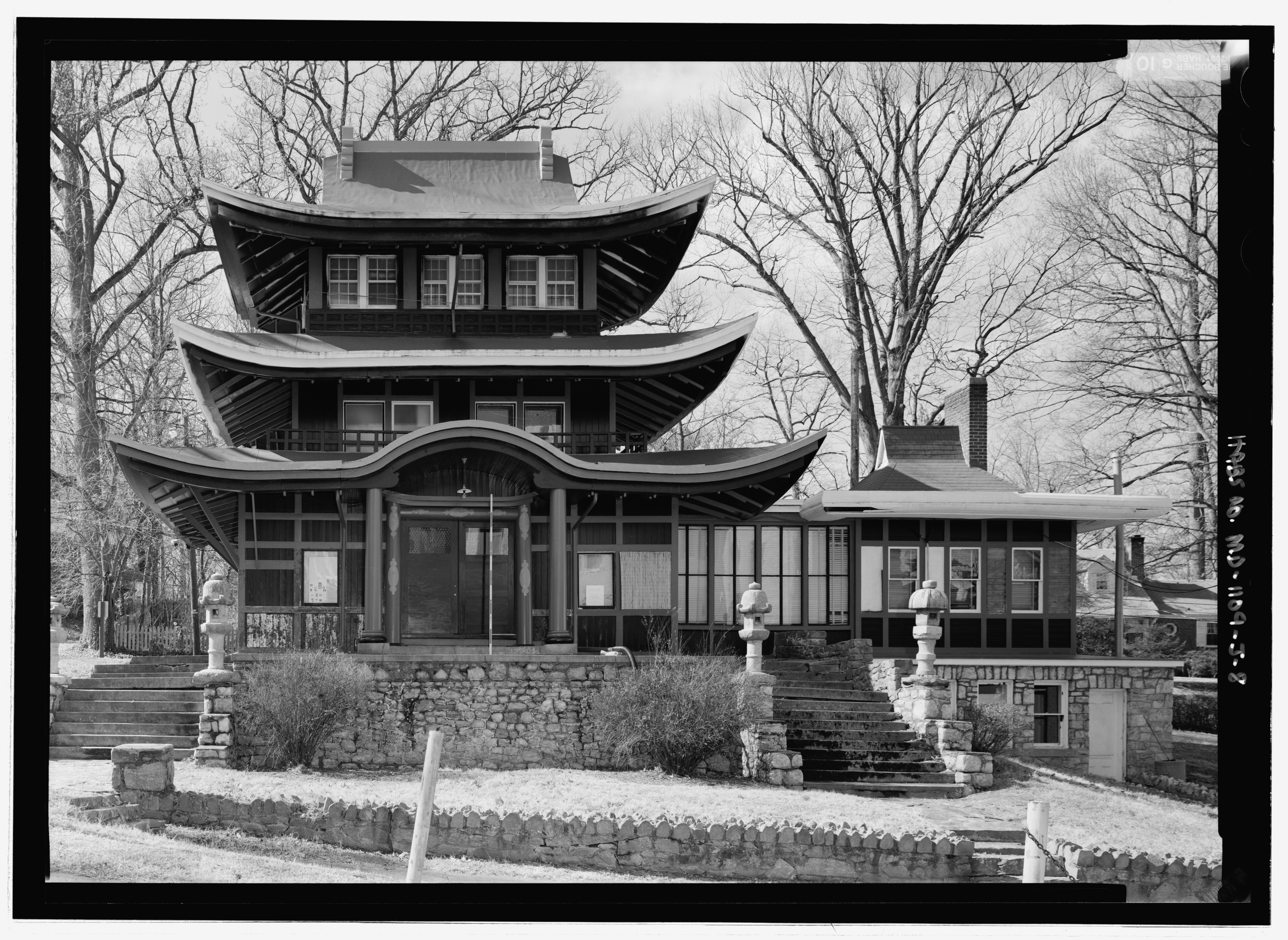
Chi Psi Upsilon Sorority Clubhouse

Situated within the National Park Seminary Historic District, the turn-of-the-century Japanese Pagoda and Japanese Bungalow served as exotic, highly ornamental clubhouses for the school's unique, themed sorority system. Reflecting the era's fascination with Asian art following late-19th-century World's Fairs, these standalone architectural "follies" were designed to enrich the young women's cultural education through immersive environments. Following decades of military use, abandonment, and severe environmental decay under the U.S. Army, a massive multi-million dollar rehabilitation project rescued the landmarks in the 2000s, carefully restoring their historic exteriors and converting them into private residences.

The Japanese Pagoda (c. 1905) stands as a campus landmark, built from the ground up to resemble an authentic Buddhist temple rather than a Western home. Rising four stories with a bold red, black, and green color scheme, the structural pavilion features dramatic, multi-tiered upturned eaves accented by decorative framing brackets, an ornate entry portal flanked by lanterns, and a traditional metal finial capping its roof. Serving the Chi Psi Epsilon sorority, its vibrant interior functioned as an upscale social hub hosting formal literary meetings, academic debates, and elaborate student teas.

The adjacent Japanese Bungalow (c. 1898–1899), built for the Chi Omicron Pi sorority, offers a more intimate and structurally modest contrast to its towering neighbor. Rather than a full temple replica, it represents a classic American suburban bungalow design—a quintessential emblem of early-20th-century domestic life—that seamlessly integrates Eastern detailing through subtly flared, curved roof eaves. Though it appeared austere next to the Pagoda, its cozy interior layout supported closely knit student gatherings, artistic performances, and shared recreational activities before both buildings were integrated into the Walter Reed Army Medical Center complex.

==== Dutch Windmill House (c. 1903) ====
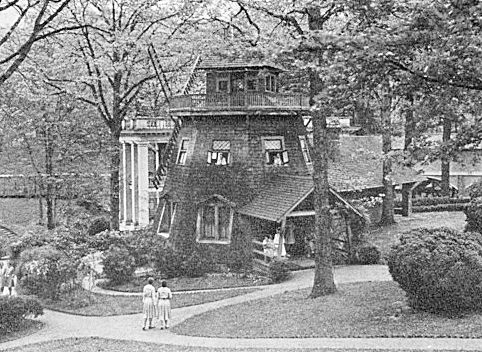
Kappa Delta Phi Sorority clubhouse

Constructed around 1903 for the National Park Seminary, the Dutch Windmill House is a distinctive octagonal structure designed by female architect Emily Elizabeth Holman in the Dutch Revival style. Featuring shingled walls and non-functional sails, it served as a themed, whimsical clubhouse for the Kappa Delta Phi sorority on the Forest Glen campus.

The tower's multi-tiered interior functioned as an exclusive social space for meetings, literary discussions, and teas before the campus transitioned through military use and eventual neglect. Following a comprehensive historical rehabilitation, the structure has been preserved as a private residence.

==== English Castle Cottage (c. 1904) ====
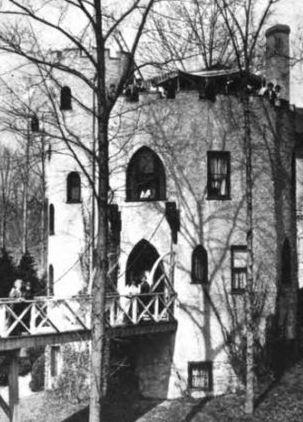
Pi Beta Nu Sorority Clubhouse

Built in 1904, the English Castle Cottage (historically referred to as the Castle or Aloha House) was added to the National Park Seminary campus as a themed clubhouse designed in the Medieval Revival style. To evoke a European aesthetic, the structure was built with crenellated battlements, an octagonal turret, and simulated stone fortifications. This architectural design stood as a visually striking landmark on the Forest Glen campus, designed to transport the young students into a historic setting.

The interior of the tower functioned as an exclusive, non-residential social haven for the young women of the Pi Beta Nu sorority. The unique layout featured circular rooms and narrow staircases where student members and faculty advisors gathered for formal initiation ceremonies, academic meetings, and intimate literary discussions. The clubhouse served as a lively hub for campus social life, hosting traditional "At-Home" tea receptions, dramatic poetry readings, and student gatherings aimed at developing contemporary social graces and deep sisterly bonds.

After 1942, United States Army modified the structure's interior layout to serve as housing quarters for medical personnel and army families. After surviving decades of severe post-war neglect, vandalism, and structural decay, the historic fortress underwent a comprehensive historical rehabilitation that preserved its medieval exterior and successfully transitioned the landmark into a unique, private residence.

==== Alpine Cottage (c. 1904) ====
Built around the turn of the century, the Alpine Cottage was added to the National Park Seminary campus as a themed structure designed in the Alpine and Swiss Revival styles. The building featured a steeply pitched roofline, decorative wooden brackets, and charming balcony railings reminiscent of traditional European mountain architecture. Acting as a visual companion to the campus's nearby Swiss Chalet, this cottage further enhanced the eclectic, international landscape of the Forest Glen campus and contributed to the school's immersive architectural environment.

The interior of the cottage functioned as a dedicated, non-residential social haven that operated in conjunction with the Pi Beta Nu sorority system. Student members and faculty advisors utilized the cozy, multi-level spaces to host formal meetings, academic discussions, and lively student social activities. The cottage served as a frequent gathering place for weekend clubs, intimate poetry readings, and traditional "At-Home" tea receptions, providing a specialized setting where young women could cultivate contemporary social graces and foster lifelong communal bonds.

Following the 1942 military acquisition, the former clubhouse served as a convalescent facility. Following decades of severe post-war neglect, abandonment, and structural weathering, the historic building was saved by a comprehensive historical rehabilitation project that meticulously preserved its exterior features and successfully converted the landmark into a private residence.

==== Spanish Mission House (c. 1905) ====
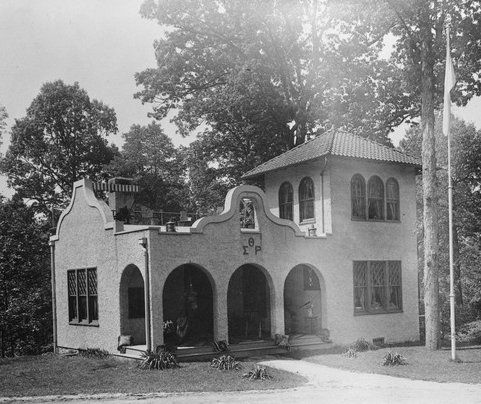
Theta Sigma Rho Sorority Clubhouse

Built around 1904, the Spanish Mission House was added to the National Park Seminary campus as a dedicated, themed clubhouse designed in the distinct Mission Revival style. To achieve an authentic Mediterranean aesthetic, the structure was constructed with characteristic stuccoed exterior walls, a red-tile roof, and prominent curved parapets. This design stood out as a unique architectural contrast to the surrounding European and Asian-inspired pavilions, intentionally broadening the eclectic, international landscape of the Forest Glen campus.

The interior functioned as a private, non-residential sanctuary and exclusive social center for the young women of the Theta Sigma Rho sorority. The clubhouse was heavily utilized for student gatherings, formal initiation rituals, and extensive cultural programming, including Spanish-themed dinners, language circles, and musical recitals. Sorority members and faculty advisors gathered in the formal rooms for academic literary discussions and traditional "At-Home" tea receptions, using the unique setting to cultivate contemporary social graces and international awareness.

During the campus's military era, the building was adapted for rehabilitation purposes, ending the sorority era and repurposing the Mission House into medical housing and administrative space for the Walter Reed Army Medical Center annex. Following decades of severe post-war neglect, abandonment, and structural weathering, the building was safely secured. It underwent a multi-million dollar, comprehensive historical rehabilitation project that meticulously preserved its exterior features and successfully converted the landmark into a private, single-family residence.

==== Italian Villa ====
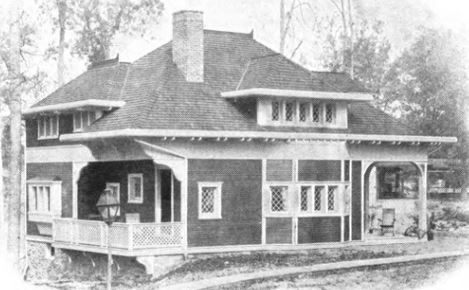
Chi Omicron Pi Sorority clubhouse

Constructed around 1905 within the National Park Seminary campus, the Italian Villa is an elegant landmark designed in the Italian Renaissance Revival style. Positioned across the glen, the structure features stone paths, scenic views, and stuccoed exterior elements designed to transport young women students to a classical European setting. Unlike the smaller, whimsical clubhouses, this multi-story building was integrated into the campus infrastructure with covered walkways connecting it directly to the Main Building, ensuring students could move between classes and social spaces without exposure to the elements.

The building operated as an exclusive clubhouse and residence for the Chi Omicron Pi sorority, serving as a prominent venue for high-end social gatherings, formal literary societies, and student events. The interior spaces were intentionally tailored to encourage scholarly debate and contemporary social graces as part of the school's lifestyle finishing curriculum. The villa's student-centric functions ceased in 1942 when the United States Army repurposed the facility for medical housing during World War II. Following decades of post-war abandonment and severe structural decay, a comprehensive historical restoration saved the property, converting it into a private, single-family residence.

==== Colonial House (c. 1906) ====
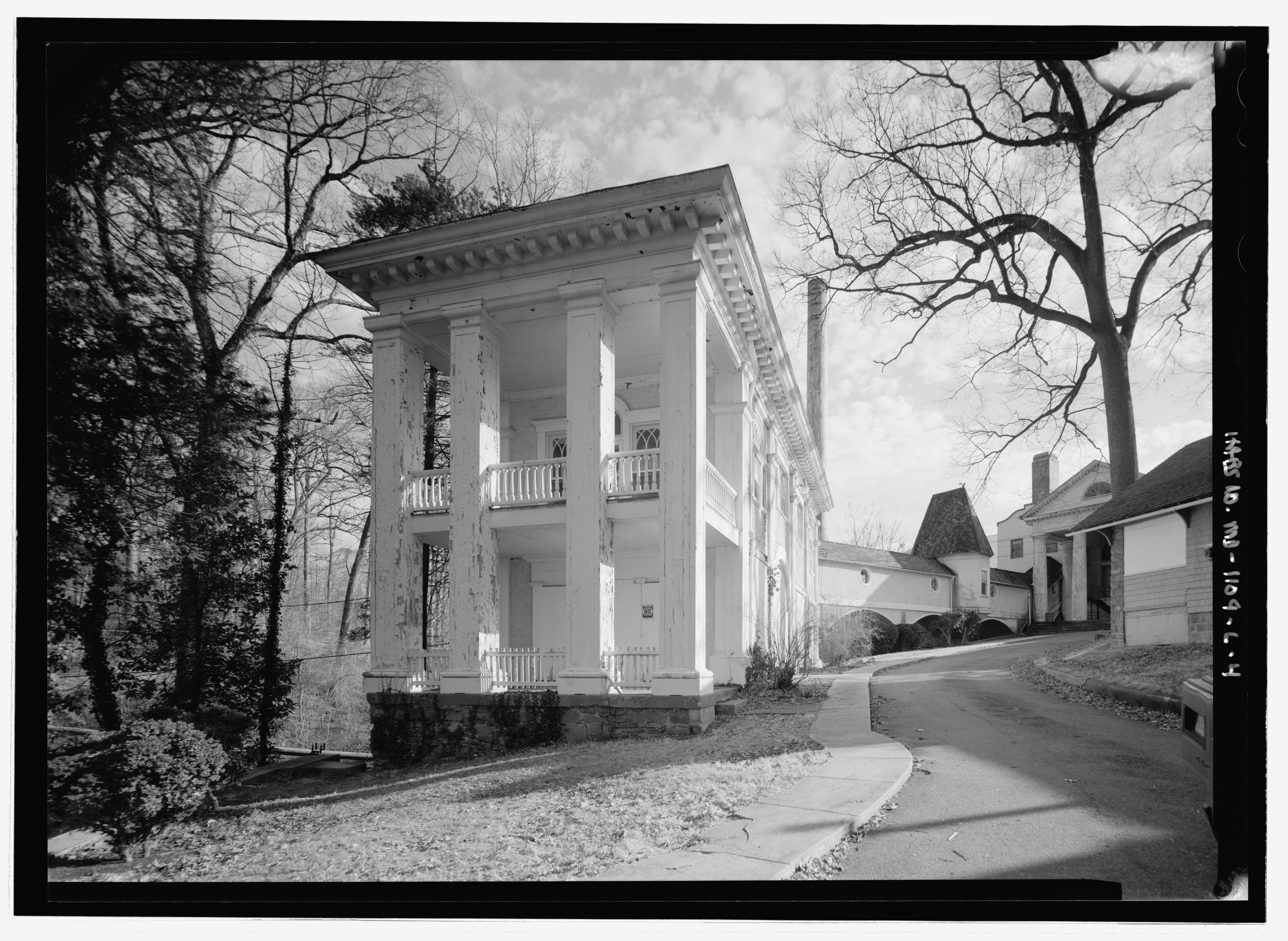
Phi Delta Psi Sorority Clubhouse

Built in 1903 as part of the National Park Seminary's themed club system, the Colonial House was designed by architect Emily Elizabeth Holman in a Colonial Revival style. The building was constructed with Georgian and Neoclassical elements, including symmetrical facade, front porches, and Neoclassical columns. It stands on Forest Glen campus along side the seminary's other structures, which drea from various other international arcitectural traditions.

The interior of the building served as a social center where the young women of the Phi Delta Psi sorority and their faculty advisors gathered. Rather than operating as living quarters, the clubhouse was designed entirely for immersive educational and recreational activities, hosting formal initiation ceremonies, academic debates, and regular "At-Home" tea receptions. The formal rooms were outfitted with fine period furnishings to instill contemporary social graces, creating an alternative educational environment where members spent hours practicing musical performances, hosting literary societies, and organizing student-led charitable events.

Repurposed during the World War II takeover, the chalet became part of the hospital complex, an annex for the Walter Reed Medical Center, bringing an abrupt end to the pavilion's student-centric functions. During the war, the military significantly altered the clubhouse's internal layout, boarding over open social areas to convert the structure into living quarters for married officers and their families. After weathering decades of post-war abandonment and severe environmental decay, the landmark was ultimately saved by a comprehensive historical rehabilitation project that meticulously restored its turn-of-the-century character and transitioned the building into a private, single-family residence.

=== Faculty ===
Among the professional teachers who taught at National Park Seminary can be named the following;

Effa Muhse the first women to get a PhD from the Indiana University. after completing her PhD in Zoology in 1908 In 1920's she taught home economics and domestic arts at National Park Seminary. Muhse also became involved in academic and professional organizations supporting women’s advancement in higher education, and participated in suffrage-era movements advocating for expanded political rights for women.

Margaret Jarman Hagood, whoM taught mathematics at the school in the early 1930s before completing her graduate studies in sociology. She earned a bachelor’s degree from Queens College in 1929 and a master’s degree from Emory University in 1930, later completing a PhD in sociology at the University of North Carolina in 1937.

While at the seminary, she taught mathematics as part of the school’s academic curriculum during a period when it functioned as a private women’s institution. She later became known for her work in quantitative sociology and rural studies, including Mothers of the South (1939) and Statistics for Sociologists (1941), which applied statistical methods to social research on rural populations during the Great Depression.

She later worked at the University of North Carolina’s Institute for Research in Social Science and the United States Department of Agriculture, where she developed statistical approaches to rural population studies and socioeconomic measurement.

=== Students ===
National Park Seminary offered a curriculum that included secondary-level (high school) instruction as well as junior college-level coursework during parts of its history. Students were organized by academic level, including high school, junior, and senior divisions. Dormitory buildings on campus, including the main building and Aloha House, were interconnected, allowing students to move between facilities without going outdoors during inclement weather.

Students were expected to participate in daily recitation and oral review of lessons, typically lasting around 10 minutes when called upon. This instructional method emphasized preparation through library study and consultation with instructors outside of class hours. The curriculum included literature, mathematics, science, and music, reflecting the school’s emphasis on a broad liberal and cultural education. Students could continue their studies at the school’s higher-level programs or transfer to other institutions of higher education. Student life at National Park Seminary combined academic study with structured social and cultural activities. The campus included themed buildings and organized student societies, which played a central role in social life and extracurricular engagement.

==== Notable alumni ====
Irene Castle (born Irene Foote) was raised in New Rochelle, New York, the daughter of prominent physician Dr. Hubert Townsend Foote and Annie Elroy Foote, where she studied dance as a child under Rosetta O'Neill.

She enrolled for the fall term in September 1908 during her months at the school, she was known for her rebellious energy and spent much of her time swimming in the seminary's unique heated indoor gymnasium pool.

Her enrollment came to an abrupt end after she decided to cut her hair into a short "bob" style. When several of her impressionable classmates copied the unconventional look, the strict administration deemed her a disruptive influence and expelled her from the institution in 1909.

Following her expulsion, she returned home to New Rochelle, where she performed in amateur theatricals and musical numbers, notably singing "The Yama-Yama Man". After meeting in 1909 and marrying Vernon Castle in 1911, Irene and Vernon Castle became prominent ballroom dancers who significantly influenced modern social dance styles. The couple became an overnight sensation in Paris with their American ragtime dances, returning to New York in 1912 as celebrated performers on Broadway and in film. The duo popularized the foxtrot in the 1914 musical Watch Your Step and established successful dance schools and clubs. Through their massive success, Irene defined 1910s fashion with her relaxed, athletic attire and the popularization of her short "Castle Bob" hairstyle. This look became a major fashion trend, contributing to early 20th-century changes in women's style and later becoming highly popularized among flappers.

== Educational system at National Park Seminary ==
The educational system at National Park Seminary emphasized daily instruction and close interaction between students and instructors. Students attended classes during the day and were expected to review and prepare material outside of class time. The curriculum emphasized comprehension, analysis, and oral expression as part of its broader finishing-school approach to education.

Instruction commonly included oral recitation and student presentations, reflecting common pedagogical methods in late 19th- and early 20th-century women’s education. Students were also expected to participate in discussion and demonstrate understanding of assigned material rather than rely solely on memorization.

Students typically spent afternoons and evenings studying in the library or consulting with instructors for assistance with coursework and assignments.

This early operational success laid the groundwork for the institution's evolution over the next several decades.

=== 1916 leadership transition ===
Vesta Harvey Cassedy died in 1910 following an illness. In the years that followed, John Irving Cassedy continued as president of National Park Seminary.

In 1912, while traveling in New Mexico, 65-year-old John Irving Cassedy married Stephana Prager, a 19-year-old recent graduate of the National Park Seminary. This development was reported to have severely affected public confidence in the institution and ultimately contributed to his departure from leadership.

In 1916, he was succeeded as president by James E. Ament, who led the school from 1916 to 1937. During this period, the institution continued to operate as a private women’s school and expanded its campus and programs.

=== National Park College ===
Following the tenure of James E. Ament, the administration of the institution changed. In 1936, the school was reorganized as National Park College in an effort to align with contemporary educational trends while continuing to operate as a private women’s institution.

Roy Tasco Davis assumed leadership from 1937 to 1942, overseeing the institution during its final years as a private educational establishment prior to its later federal use.

=== Statues and decorative sculpture ===
The campus of National Park Seminary includes a variety of decorative sculptures and ornamental features that were installed primarily during the late 19th and early 20th centuries, when the institution operated as a private women’s school. These elements contributed to the landscaped and thematic design of the grounds.

The central fountain, installed in the early 20th century (c. 1900–1910), features a single bronze sculptural composition arranged in tiers, depicting seahorses above sirens, with eagles positioned at the upper level. The sculpture serves as the focal point of the fountain and is located in a landscaped courtyard. During the period of U.S. Army use of the site in the mid-20th century, the bronze surface was reportedly painted white. The fountain and its sculpture were originally installed as part of the campus’s decorative landscape program.

Another prominent feature, also dating to the early 20th century, is a pair of bronze lions located near the main gatehouse. These sculptures function as ornamental gate guardians and form part of the formal entrance design of the campus.

=== Walter Reed Forest Glen Annex ===
With the onset of World War II, the United States Army began planning for the medical needs of returning soldiers. In 1942, the property was acquired by Walter Reed Army Hospital as a medical facility for disabled soldiers, thus closing the college. The Army paid $890,000 for the land and buildings that became the Walter Reed Forest Glen Annex. The goal was to provide to seriously injured service members a quiet, green space for rehabilitation and recovery that was within a short drive from the heavily urbanized neighborhood surrounding the hospital. Following World War II and the Korean War, the U.S. Army attempted to maintain the space with progressively limited funds; the U.S. Army employed some of the unique sorority houses as base housing for military officers who organized themselves and enlisted soldiers to maintain the seminary space. Eventually, however, the Army lost sufficient funding from the U.S. Congress during the 1960-1970s to maintain the space and was compelled to declare the property excess, pending transfer to the General Services Administration to find a new owner.

=== Preservation and development ===
On September 14, 1972, a 27-acre (0.11-km^{2}) National Park Seminary Historic District was listed as a national historic district on the National Register of Historic Places. In the following years, the historical integrity of the property was threatened by neglect and vandalism. The Greek Revival Odeon Theater was lost to arson in 1993. Local preservation groups took action and "Save Our Seminary" (SOS) was formed in 1988. In the late 1990s, Senator Paul Sarbanes was instrumental in encouraging the Army to make repairs to some of the buildings and, ultimately, in releasing the property for development. With private donations, SOS began an exterior restoration project of the pagoda in 1999, completed in 2003.

In 2003, a development team led by the Alexander Company began implementing a plan to preserve the campus as the core of a new residential neighborhood. The residential neighborhood consists of townhomes, condominiums, and apartments. The townhomes are in a variety of architectural styles from Spanish mission to colonial. The apartments, some of which are affordable housing, are in the main structure. Condominiums are located in several buildings that branch off of the main structure including the Senior House, Senior Annex, and Music Hall. There are condominiums in the Chapel and Aloha House. The Alexander Company's plans for redevelopment of the site were featured in a 2006 New York Times story.

Portions of the abandoned seminary grounds were made available for townhouse development which began in 2006. Portions of the old-growth forest in the glen were cut down for the commercial housing development and portions were retained; likewise, parts of the historically sensitive yards and courts were spared from redevelopment.

== Gallery ==
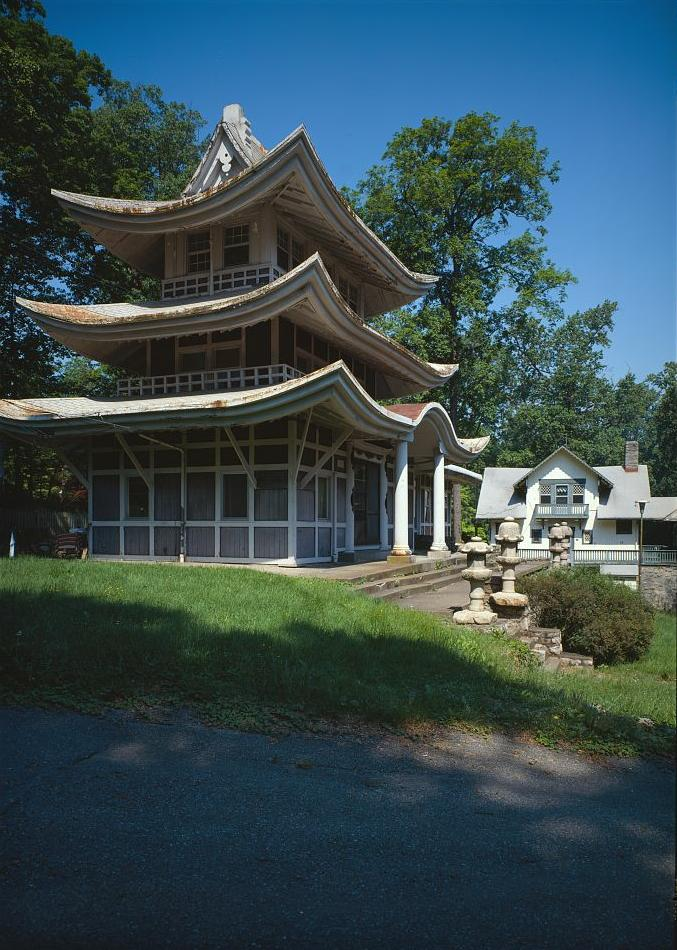

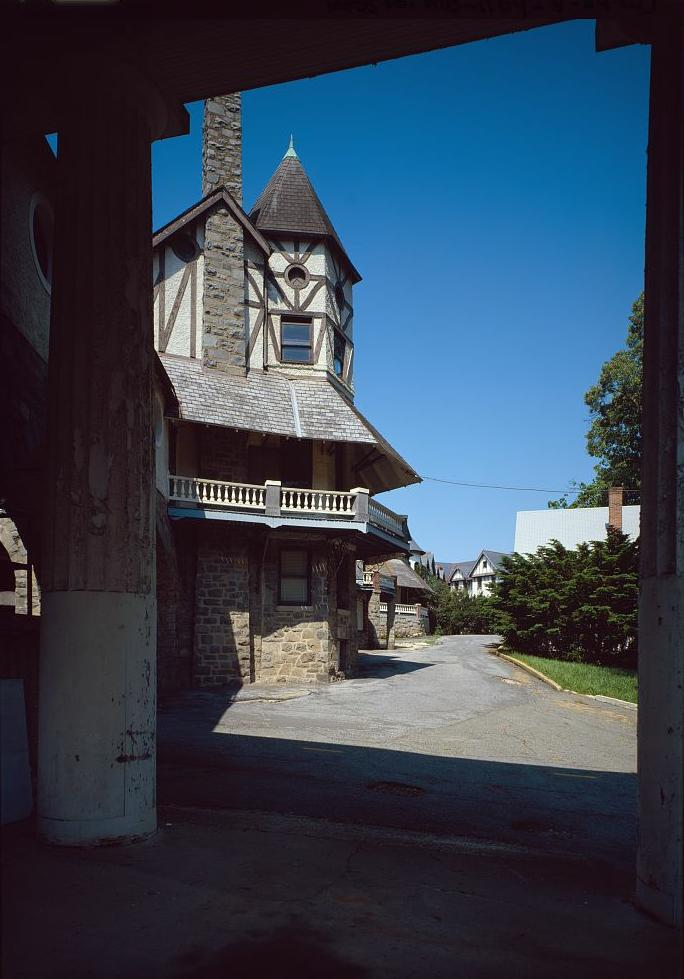

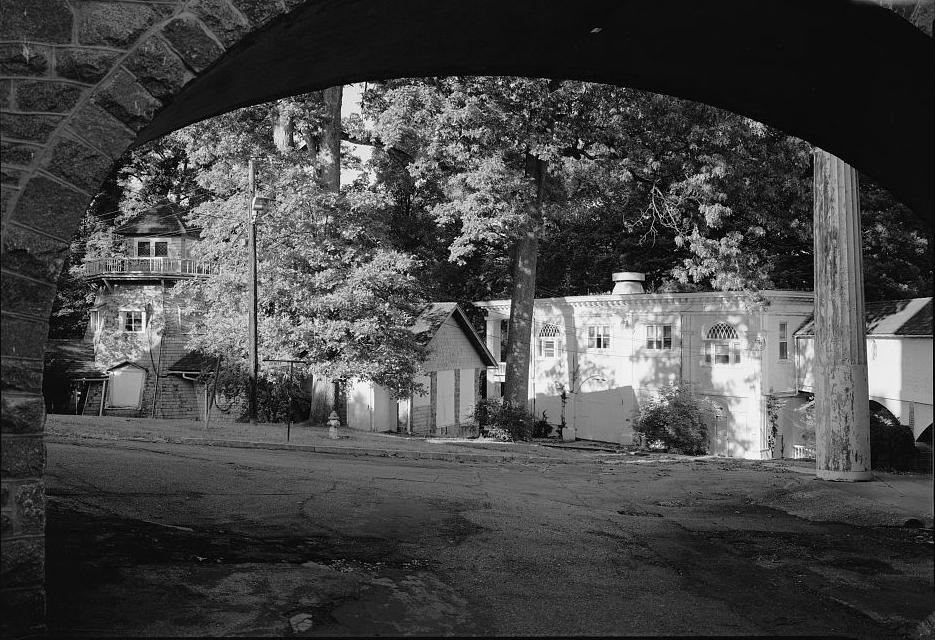

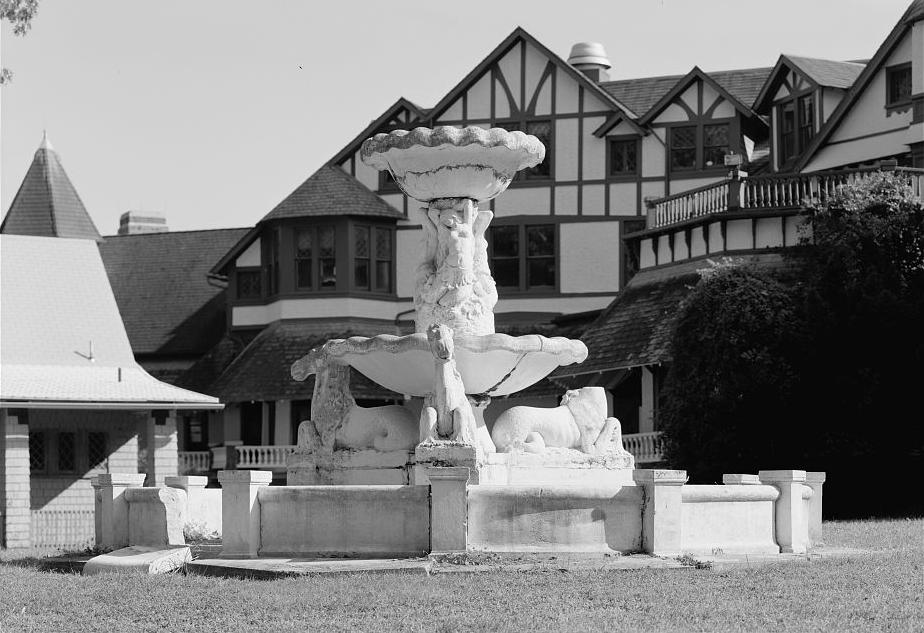

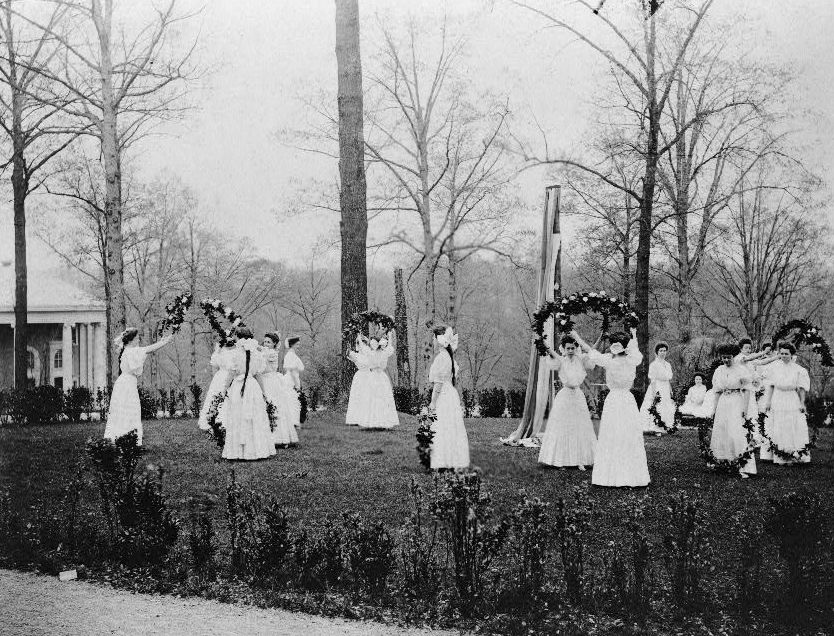
