= Emily Elizabeth Holman =

American architect (1854–1925)

Elizabeth Emily Holman
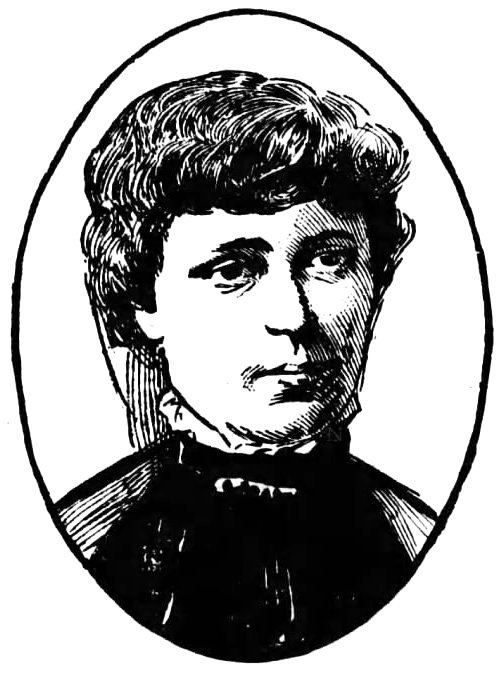
- Holman c. 1900
- Born: February 2, 1854; Pennsylvania, US
- Died: September 13, 1925 (aged 71)
- Other name: Lillie Edwards
- Occupation: architect
- Years active: 1884–1914
- Known for: designing most of the buildings at the National Park Seminary

Emily Elizabeth "Lillie" Edwards Holman (née Smith; February 2, 1854 – September 13, 1925), better known by her professional name of E. E. Holman, was an American architect. Active from the 1880s to her retirement in 1914, she was responsible for planning several important historical sites like the Goold House in the Wilder Village Historic District, Wilder, Vermont and the National Park Seminary among many others.

== Biography ==
Emily Elizabeth "Lillie" Smith Edwards Holman was born on February 2, 1854, in Pennsylvania, to Samuel Lawrence Smith (1820–?) and Susan L. Hance (1830–1913). Little is known of her early life, however at the age of 17, in 1871, she married Robert L. Edwards (1847–?), with whom she had a daughter, Louise B. Edwards (8 April 1872 – 9 January 1929). After Edwards' death, she married the widower David Shepard Holman (1827–1901), who was a scientist known for creating the Holman Life Slides used in microscopes. She and Holman had no children.

Holman began to work as an architect in the late 1880s, working first as a clerk in an architectural firm. Recognizing that she had talent, she learned the craft and became the person her colleagues relied upon for drawings and design. In 1893, she decided to embark in her own firm and established the company with the name of E. E. Holman, in a deliberate attempt to make her gender irrelevant, at 1020 Chestnut Street, Philadelphia, Pennsylvania. In 1894, she published a plan book of 32 designs "Picturesque Cottages: 32 New & Original Designs." Plan books were an ideal way for architects to bring in customers through contractors and individuals who would be seeking a contractor. Holman went on to publish at least 7 other known plan books focusing on cottages, bungalows, and camps, she advertised these in newspapers and magazines, such as the Ladies Home Journal. She worked in a variety of different styles, but predominantly her residential work adapted American Craftsman and often added elements of Neoclassical or Colonial styles. She retired in 1914. She died on September 13, 1925, aged 71, and was interred in the south section of Laurel Hill Cemetery in Philadelphia.

Holman built both residential and public spaces, including the summer home of John Hay, Secretary of State in McKinley’s Cabinet; the actor, Francis Wilson's, second home on Lake Mahopac, New York; most of the buildings in the National Park Seminary outside of Washington, DC; and homes from Canada to Jamaica and in every US state except Mississippi. Many of her clients were prominent businessmen, such as Thomas C. Cairns, General Manager of the Alabama Portland Cement Company; Nathaniel K. Davidyan, an immigrant from Armenia, who was a Turkish rug dealer; Frank P. Tanner, banker from Ouray, Colorado; Almon Penfield Turner, president of the Canadian Copper Company; and Henry K. Wick, a coal mining executive in Youngstown, Ohio.

== Selected projects ==
=== Wilder Village Historic District ===
54 Norwich Avenue, in Wilder, Vermont, was designed in the Queen Anne style in 1895 for a prominent merchant, Thomas Goold and his wife, Sarah. It has a typical asymmetrical gable front and is one of the few dwellings in the town which was built to professional specifications. Holman drafted the plans in 1895 and the Hartford Historical Society, in Hartford, Vermont, retains some of the original plans. In 1999, the Wilder Village Historic District was listed on the National Register of Historic Places.

=== National Park Seminary ===
The National Park Seminary was a project that lasted for several years and according to an interview in the New York Tribune, Holman created nearly every building on the site. A former hotel/casino, the site was purchased by John and Vesta Cassedy in 1894 with plans to make an exclusive finishing school there. There are approximately 20 buildings on the site (though the ballroom was added in 1927 and was not designed by Holman). Besides the eight sorority clubhouses built between 1894 and 1904, there are the Chapel (1898), the Aloha Dormitory (1898), the Miller Library (1901), the Odeon Theater (1907), gymnasium (1907), and an Italianate dormitory. The United States Army purchased the property in 1941 and incorporated the site as part of the Walter Reed Army Medical Center. During the period it operated as a hospital some interior and exterior alterations, which changed the "historical integrity of the structures" were made. In an attempt to prevent further deterioration or significant loss, in 1972, the remaining buildings were designated on the National Register of Historic Places.

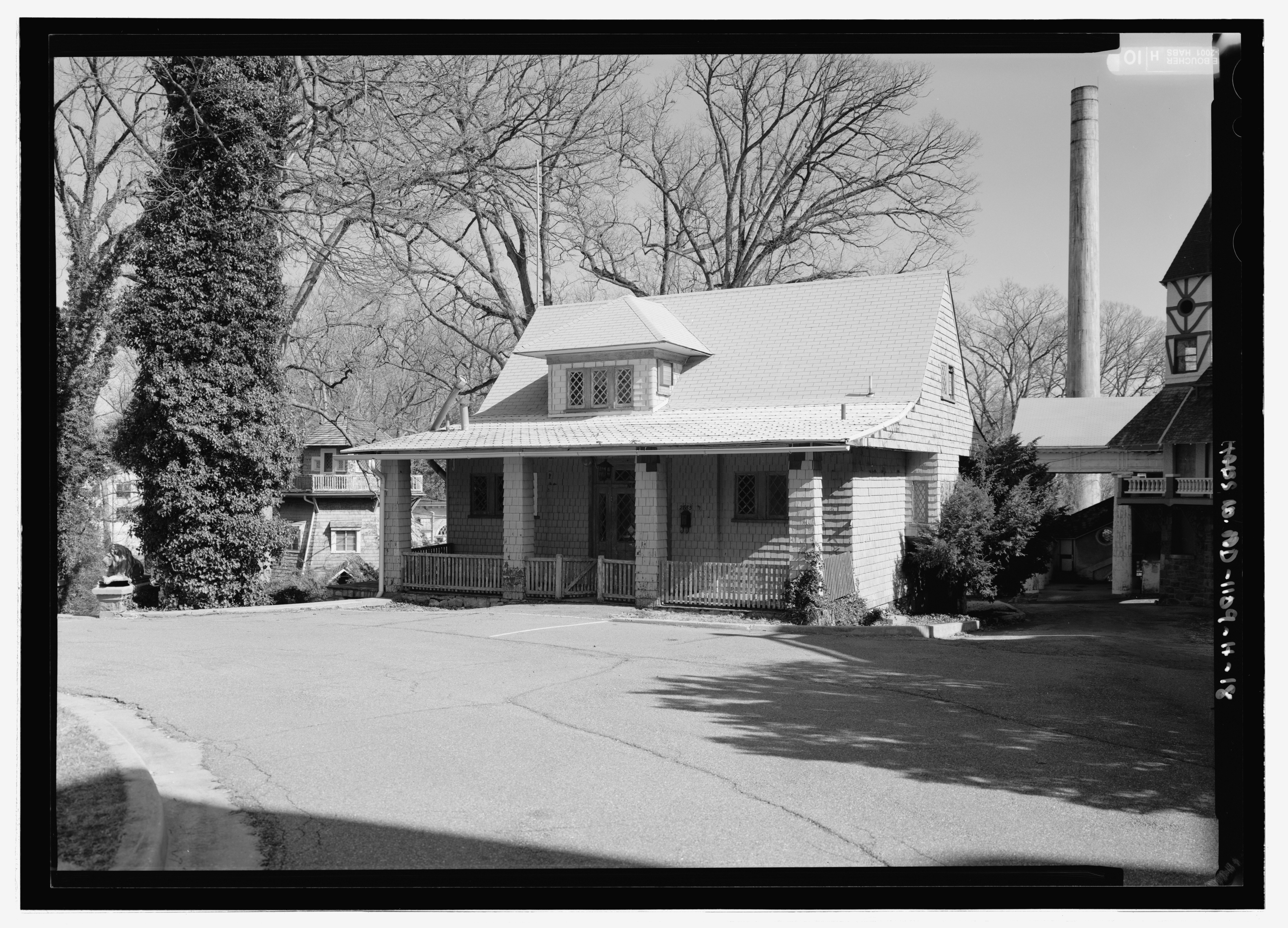
Alpha Epsilon Pi Sorority clubhouse

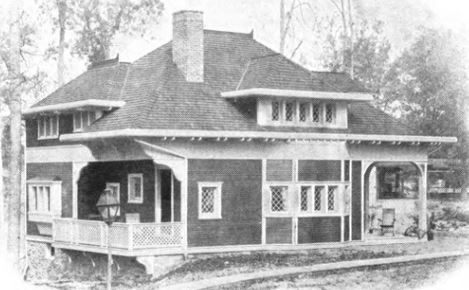
Chi Omicron Pi Sorority clubhouse

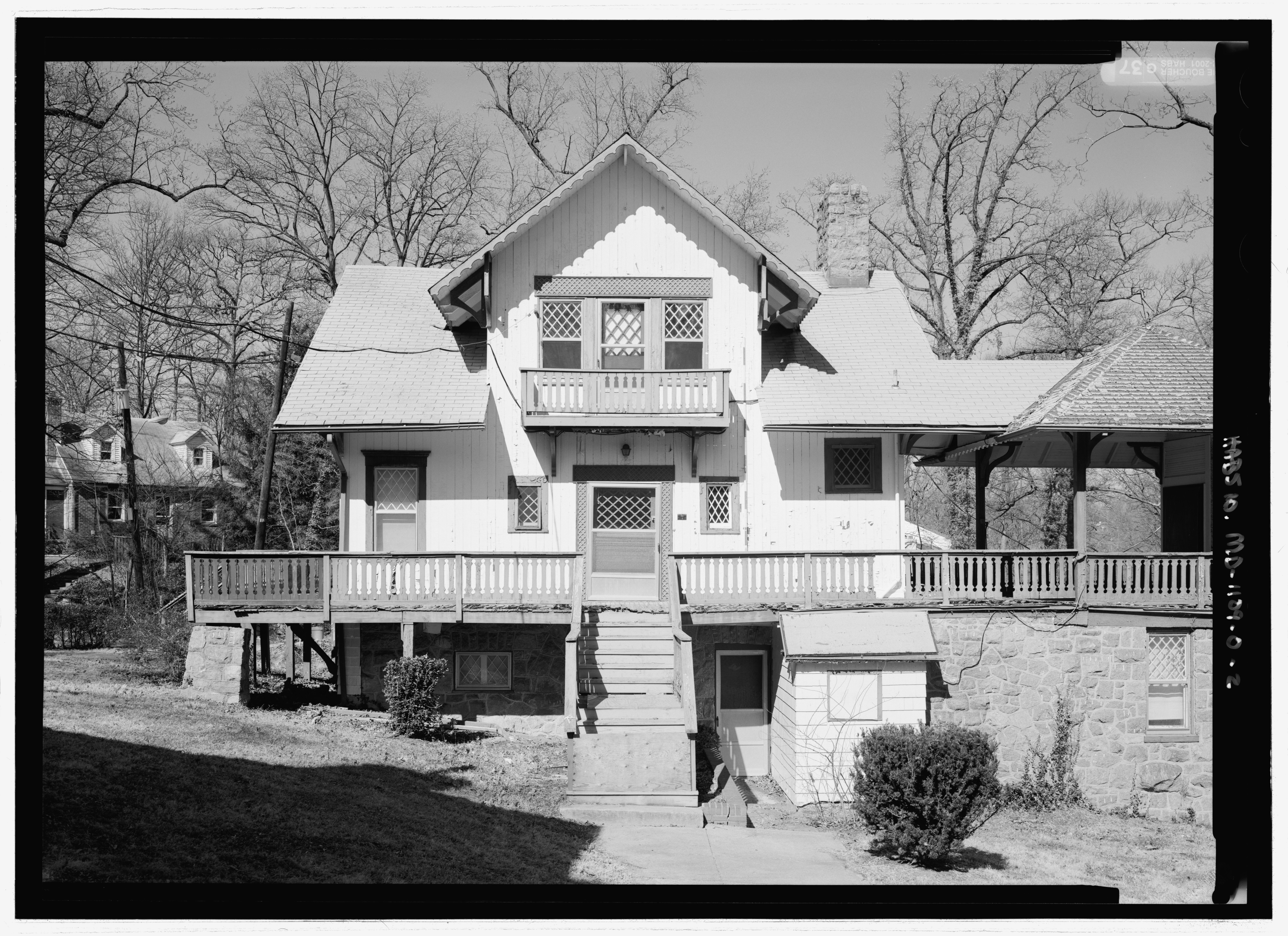
Zeta Eta Theta Sorority clubhouse

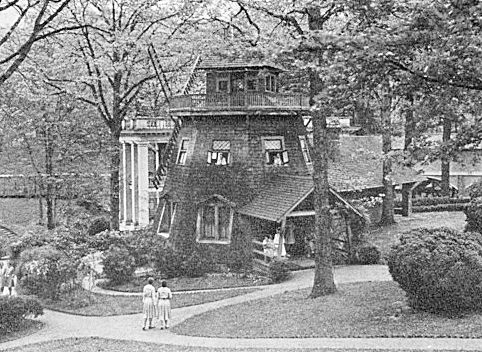
Kappa Delta Phi Sorority clubhouse
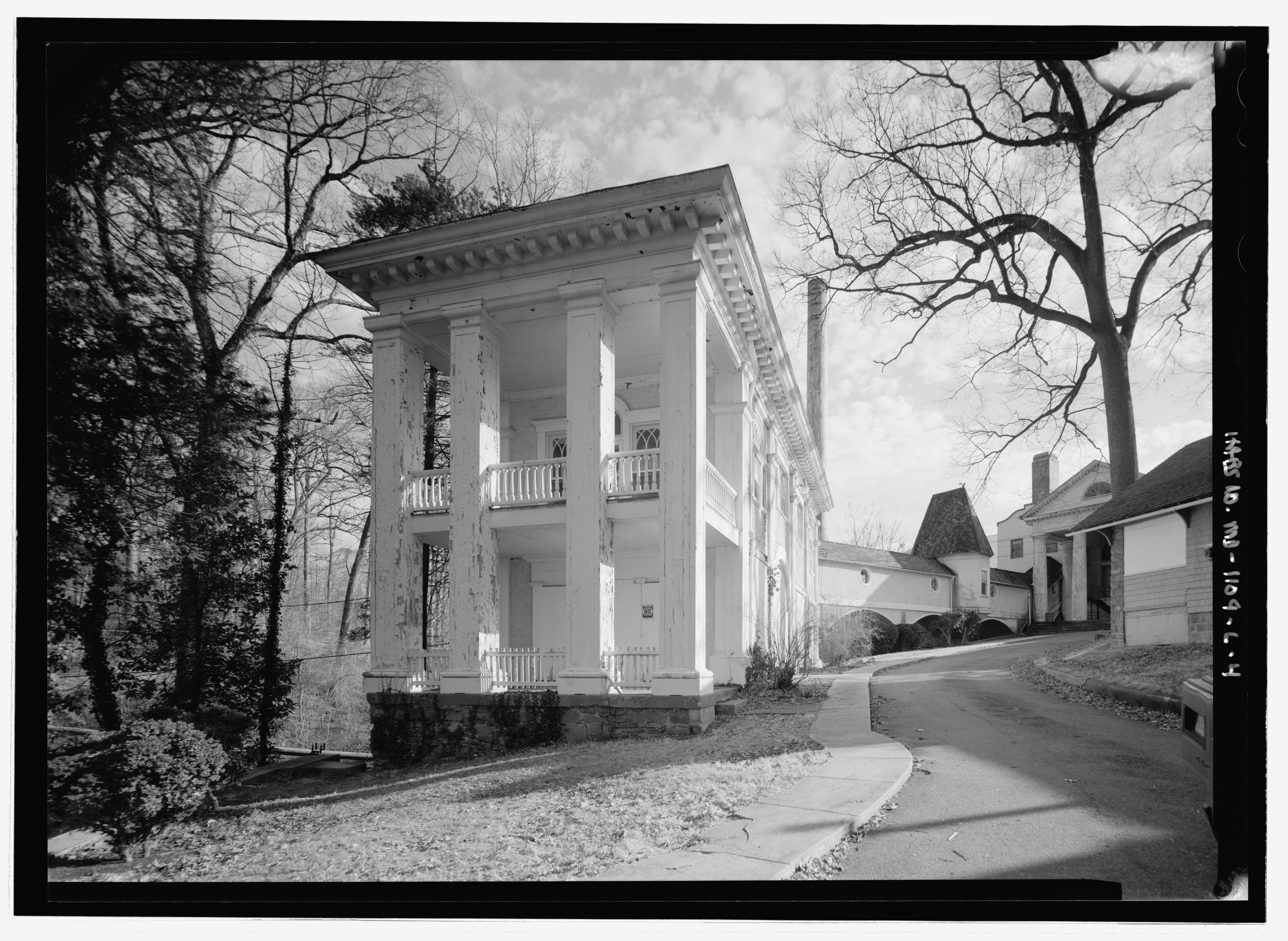
Phi Delta Psi Sorority Clubhouse

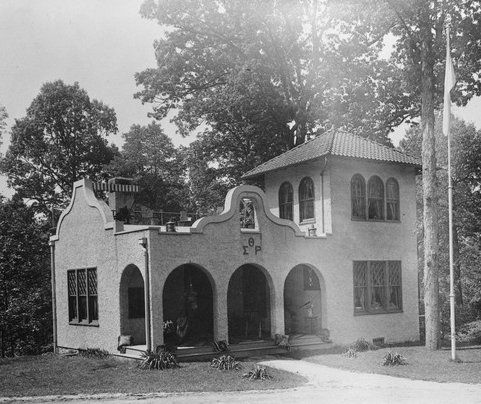
Theta Sigma Rho Sorority Clubhouse

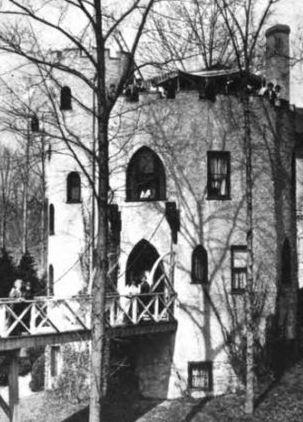
Pi Beta Nu Sorority Clubhouse

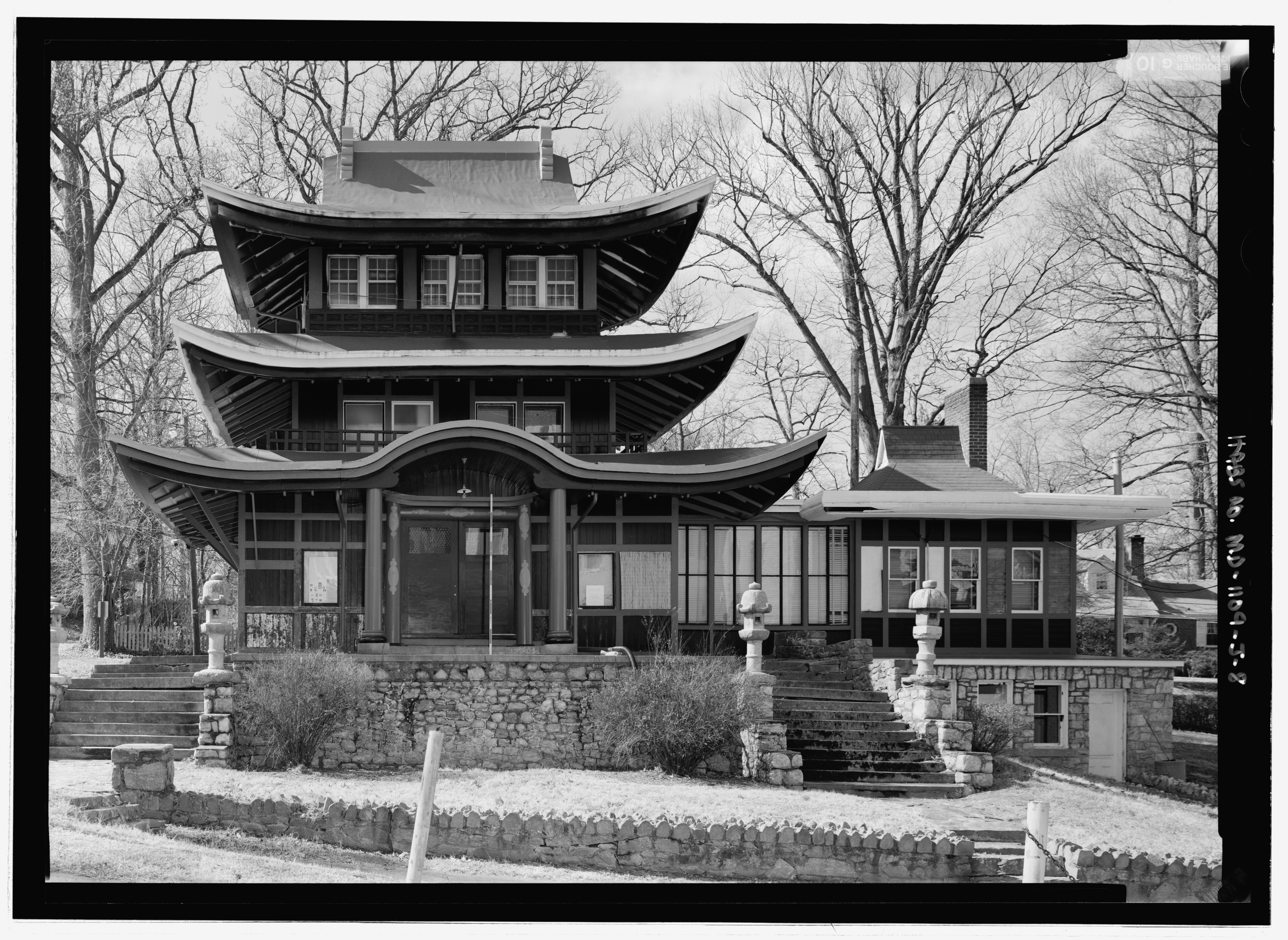
Chi Psi Upsilon Sorority Clubhouse

Each of the cottages on the property were designed by Holman and the girls for each sorority selected the plans under which their clubhouse was designed. The clubhouses were not lived in but were used for social functions. The first bungalow was built for the Alpha Epsilon Pi Sorority formed in 1895. It followed the East Coast bungalow style, utilizing oak trees which had been felled to clear the site. The second bungalow built was for the Chi Omicron Pi ("Chiopi") Sorority, which had been formed in 1894, but whose clubhouse was not built until after the completion of Alpha. Built in 1896, it was also in the bungalow style but featured upturned edges giving it an oriental look. The third clubhouse built was for the Zeta Eta Theta Sorority in 1898. It was built in the style of a Swiss chalet and relocated from its original site when the ballroom was built in 1927. The Kappa Delta Phi Sorority was formed in 1899 and selected a smocked Dutch Windmill style from Holman's plan book. The fifth bungalow was built in 1903 for the Phi Delta Psi Sorority in the Colonial Revival style, featuring both Georgian and Neoclassical elements. It was initially intended to emulate an English gatehouse, but the road underneath was never completed. The sixth bungalow was built for the Theta Sigma Rho Sorority, which formed in 1903. The sorority sisters chose the Spanish Mission Revival style for their clubhouse. It was the first example of Mission style in the Washington, D.C. metropolitan area and its interior featured authentic Native American rugs and furnishings from New Mexico. Pi Beta Nu Sorority formed in 1903, but their clubhouse was not built until 1904. The girls chose a circular stuccoed Castle, based on a British design complete with a drawbridge. The last of the clubhouses to be completed was perhaps the most distinctive. It was built for the Chi Psi Upsilon Sorority in 1904 and is in the style of a Japanese pagoda. Its interior featured a Buddha statue as well as many authentic details.

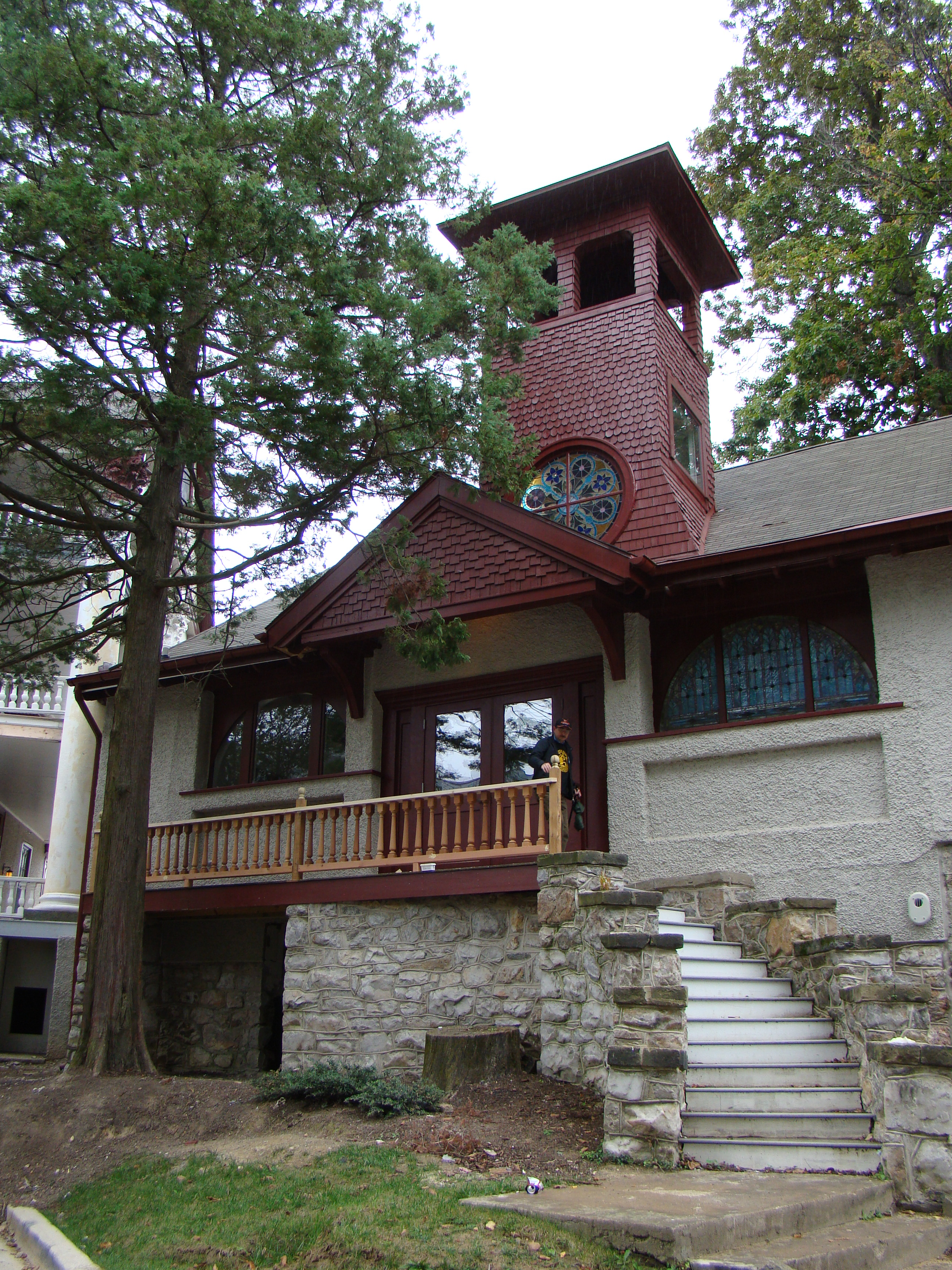
Chapel, built 1898

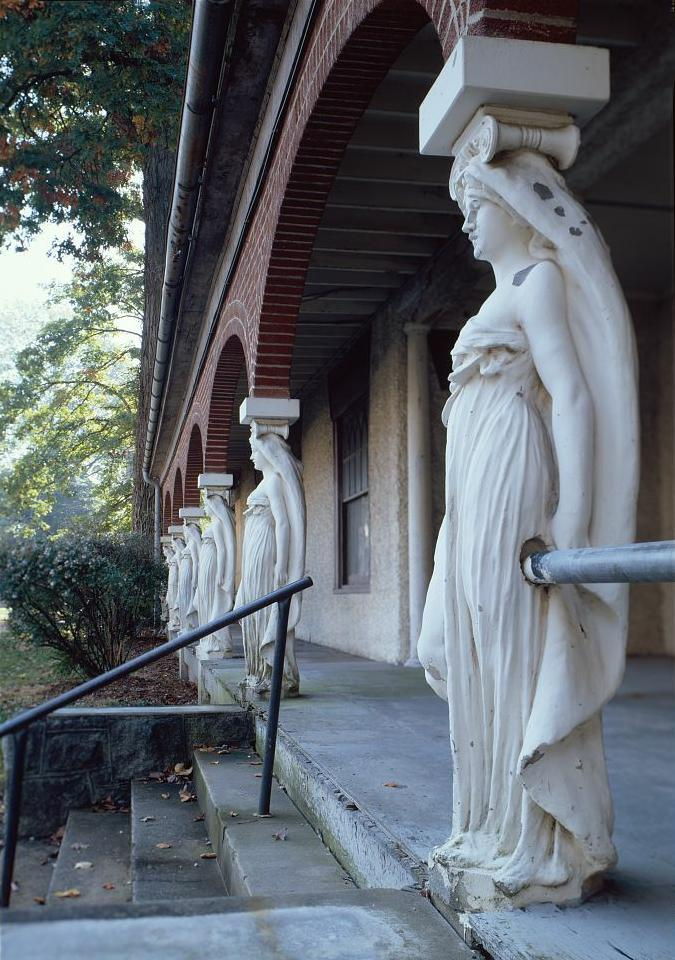
Aloha Dormitory

In 1898, the chapel was constructed. It is a rectangular stuccoed building with a bell tower and wood trim. Stained glass, typical of the late nineteenth century is featured. Originally the chapel had green velour, auditorium-style seats, but the army replaced them with pews. The Aloha Dormitory was also built in 1898 and is stucco with wood trim. The one story arcade is flanked by a series of arches supported by caryatids. In 1901, Holman built the Miller Library, which is not the main library of the property but was built to house a collection of rare books for Dewitt Miller, a personal friend of the Cassedys. The stucco band around the exterior of the building marks the interior location of the mezzanine level. An office on the upper level is believed to have been used by Miller when he visited the property.

After completion of the clubhouses, the Odeon Theater and the new gymnasium were built in 1907. Both are in the Greek Revival style, though the elements are stronger in the gymnasium. The theater is a semi-circular bay with a portico of Ionic columns. The three-story gymnasium has a portico supported by six Corinthian columns. The entrance is flanked by two Rundbogenstil windows and the center façade has a two-story protrusion which features an entablature supported by two pilasters and a round-arched window at the peak. The gymnasium underwent a renovation and restoration project in 2014, but the theater burned down in 1993.

=== Buena Vista ===
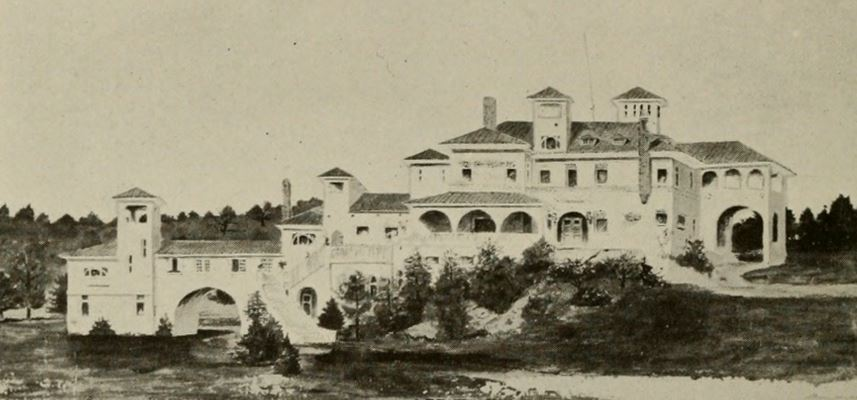
Joseph Dillaway Sawyer home "Buena Vista" Old Greenwich, Connecticut, 1900, Architect Emily Elizabeth Holman

Joseph Dillaway Sawyer, biographer of George Washington and an early subdivision developer, purchased a 78-acre farm from the widow Sabina Bowen in 1886 in Old Greenwich, Connecticut, with plans to build and divide the parcel into plots as summer homes for New Yorkers. When Sawyer bought the farm, he selected one site which he envisioned as the location of a "Moorish castle". Though he wrote a book about his development of the houses on other sites and designed their plans himself, Sawyer hired Holman to design his Italianate style mansion, which stretches 228 feet across a 9.72-acre lot and contains 9,342 interior square feet. Spanning an entire city block, the house featured a stuccoed exterior, arch-windowed turrets and copper-flashed, tiled roofing. The interior sported multiple stairways to the towers of the four-story dwelling. In addition to a 25 x 25 ft mahogany-paneled library and a dining room of equal size, the house had a billiard room, servants quarters and multiple bedrooms, as well as fireplaces on each floor. The house was constructed to follow the contours of the hill upon which it was built and provided a panoramic view of the Long Island Sound. The house was scheduled for demolition due to its deteriorated state in 2014.

== Works ==
- 1894–1907 numerous buildings located at Linden Lane, Forest Glen Park, Maryland which are part of the National Park Seminary
- 1895 residence in Woodbridge Township, New Jersey
- 1895 C. P. Havaland residence, Camden, New York
- 1895 residence in Hatboro, New Jersey
- 1895 Thomas P. Goold residence, Wilder, Vermont, Queen Anne style architecture.
- 1898 I. W. C. Rylund residence, Friendsville, Pennsylvania
- 1900 Joseph Dillaway Sawyer home Old Greenwich, Connecticut, Italianate architecture.
- 1900 residence in Jamaica, West Indies
- 1901 Frank P. Tanner House, Ouray, Colorado, Dutch Colonial Revival architecture.
- 1901 Thomas C. Cairns residence Demopolis, Alabama
- 1901 A. P. Turner residence Copper Cliff, Ontario, Canada, log Ranch-style architecture.
- 1901 H. K. Wick residence, Youngstown, Ohio
- 1901 W. S. Morse residence Seaford, Delaware
- 1901 Dr. J. R. Goodloe residence Demopolis, Alabama
- 1901 residence in Garden City, Long Island, New York
- 1901 residence in Coronado, California
- 1906 Horace R. Moses house "Chestnut Hill" Philadelphia, Pennsylvania
- 1907 W. T. Stewart Home of Corsicana, Texas, Colonial Revival American Craftsman bungalow style.
- 1908 residence Englewood, New Jersey, Colonial Revival architecture.
- 1908 N. R. Davidyan residence and stable, Moorestown, New Jersey, American Foursquare style.
- before 1910 Francis Wilson's second home, "The Hill" Lake Mahopac, New York
- 1909 J. E. Wing residence, Mechanicsburg, Ohio, concrete Colonial Revival architecture.
- 1915 C. E. Cox residence, Pennington, New Jersey

== Published works ==
- Holman, E. E. (1894). Picturesque Cottages: 32 New and Original Designs. Philadelphia.
- Holman, E. E. (1901–1903). Picturesque Summer Cottages: Containing 35 New and Original Designs. 3 vols. Philadelphia.
- Holman, E. E. (1903). Picturesque Summer Cottages: Designs for Summer Homes, Camps and Slab Cabins. Vols I–II. Philadelphia.
- Holman, E. E. (1903). Picturesque Summer Cottages: Designs for Stone, Shingle and Rustic Summer Cottages and Bungalows. Vol III. Philadelphia.
- Holman, E. E. (1904). New Picturesque Cottages: Containing Original and Beautiful Designs for Suburban Homes from $2,800 to $6,000. Philadelphia.
- Holman, E. E. (1906). A Book of Bungalows: Containing 30 New and Original Designs. Philadelphia.
- Holman, E. E. (1907). Picturesque Suburban Homes: 30 Designs from $3,000 to $10,000. Philadelphia.
- Holman, E. E. (1908). Picturesque Camps, Cabins and Shacks: Containing 40 New and Original Designs. Philadelphia.
- Holman, E. E. (1909). Picturesque Suburban Houses. Philadelphia.

== Sources ==
- Allaback, Sarah (2008). The First American Women Architects. Champaign, Illinois: University of Illinois Press. ISBN 978-0-252-03321-6.
- Culbertson, Margaret (1999). Texas Houses Built by the Book: The Use of Published Designs, 1850–1925. College Station, Texas: Texas A&M University Press. ISBN 978-0-89096-863-5.
- Holman, David Emory (1909). The Holmans in America : concerning the descendants of Solaman Holman who settled in West Newbury, Massachusetts, in 1692-3 one of whom is William Howard Taft, the President of the United States, including a page of the other lines of Holmans in America, with notes and anecdotes of those of the name in other countries. New York: Grafton Press.
- Leach, Sara Amy (January 2000). "National Park Seminary Historic District". Annapolis, Maryland: Maryland Historical Trust. Archived from the original on 11 January 2012.
- Lesley, Robert Whitman; Lober, John Baptiste; Bartlett, George S. (1924). History of the Portland cement industry in the United States: with appendices covering progress of the industry by years and an outline of the organization and activities of the Portland Cement Association. Chicago, Illinois: International Trade Press, Inc.
- Sawyer, Joseph Dillaway (1914). How to Make a Country Place – An Account of the Successes and the Mistakes of an Amateur in Thirty-Five Years of Farming, Building, and Development -. New York: Orange Judd Company. reprint 2012 (ISBN 978-1-4474-6341-2 )

== Photo gallery ==
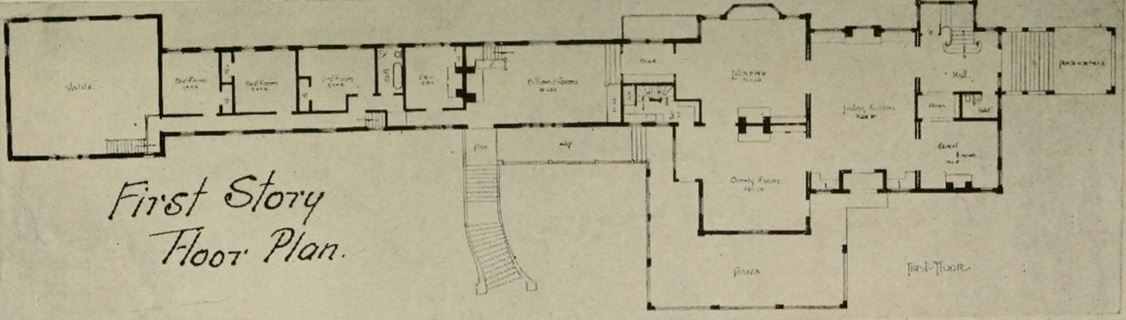
floor plan, Joseph Dillaway Sawyer home "Buena Vista" Old Greenwich, Connecticut, 1900

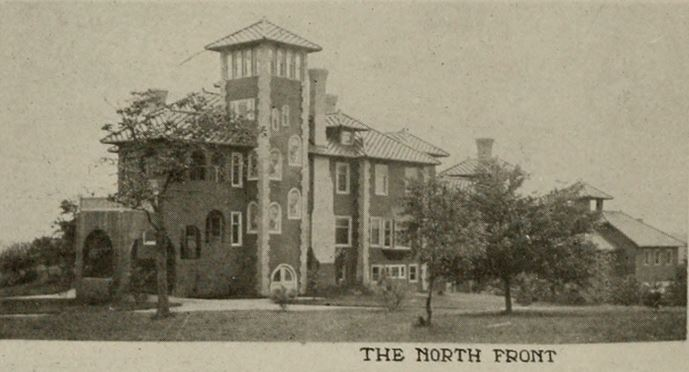
North Front, Joseph Dillaway Sawyer home "Buena Vista" Old Greenwich, Connecticut, 1900

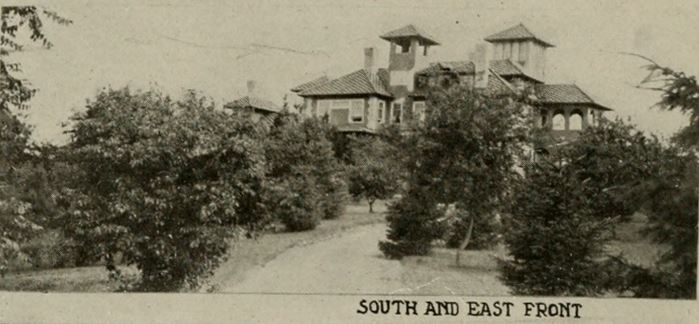
South and East Front, Joseph Dillaway Sawyer home "Buena Vista" Old Greenwich, Connecticut, 1900

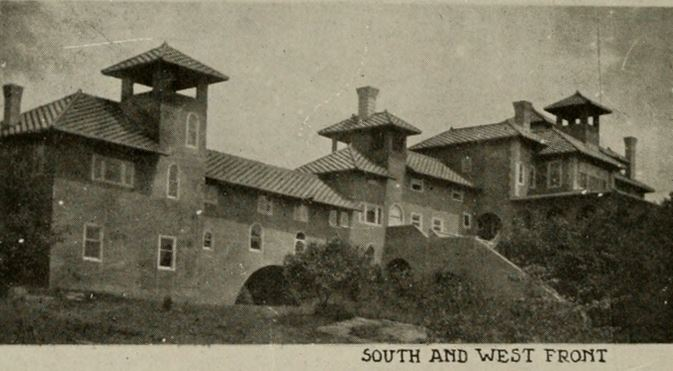
South and West Front, Joseph Dillaway Sawyer home "Buena Vista" Old Greenwich, Connecticut, 1900

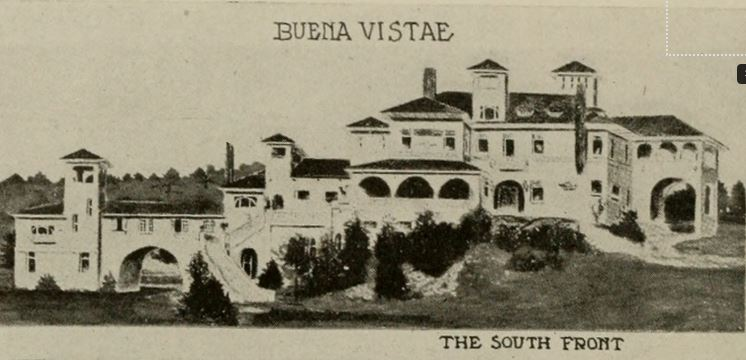
South Front, Joseph Dillaway Sawyer home "Buena Vista" Old Greenwich, Connecticut, 1900

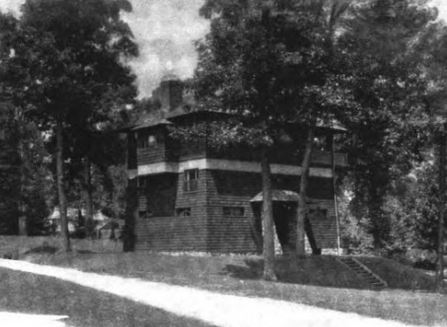
Miller Library, National Park Seminary, 1901

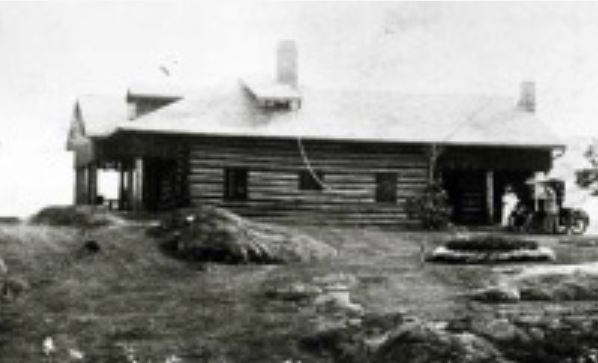
A. P. Turner residence Copper Cliff, Ontario, Canada, 1905

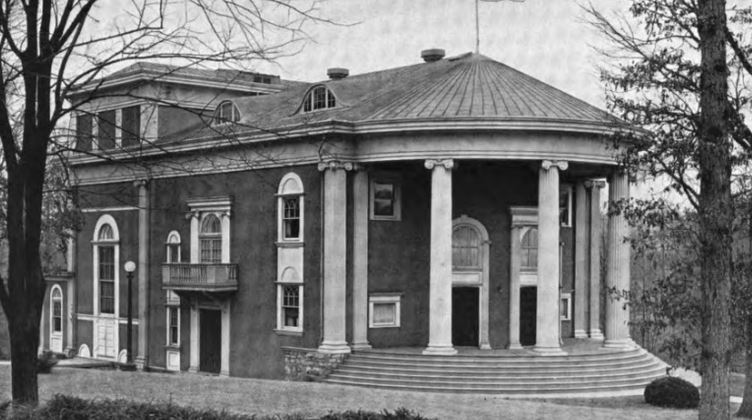
Odeon Theater, National Park Seminary, 1907

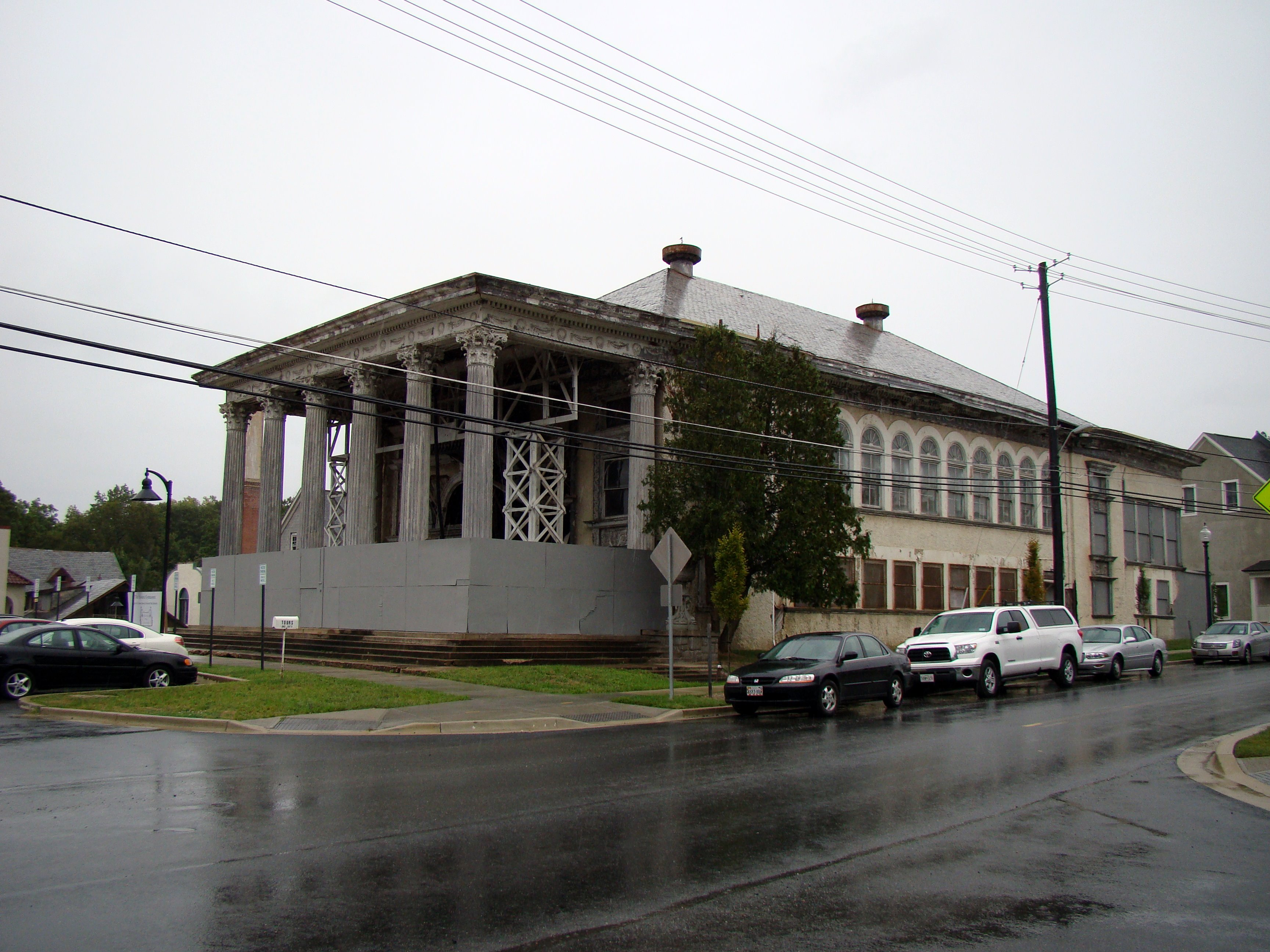
Gymnasium, National Park Seminary, 1907

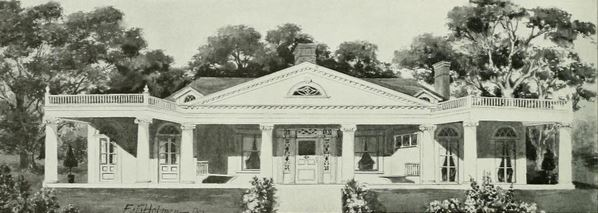
W. T. Stewart Home of Corsicana, Texas, 1907

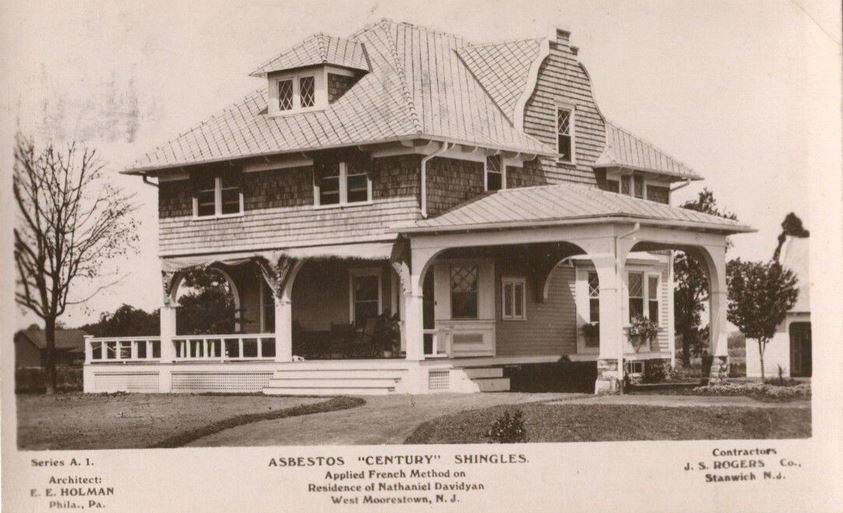
Nathaniel Davidyan residence 1908

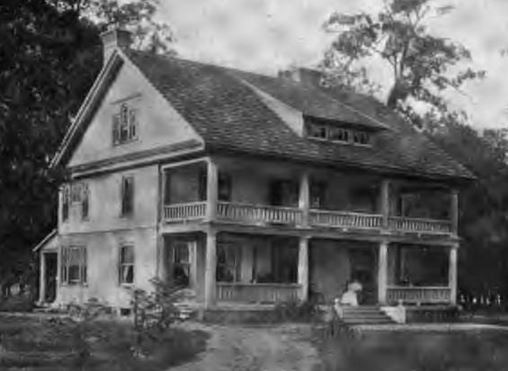
J. E. Wing residence, Mechanicsburg, Ohio, 1909
