= MetroExtra =

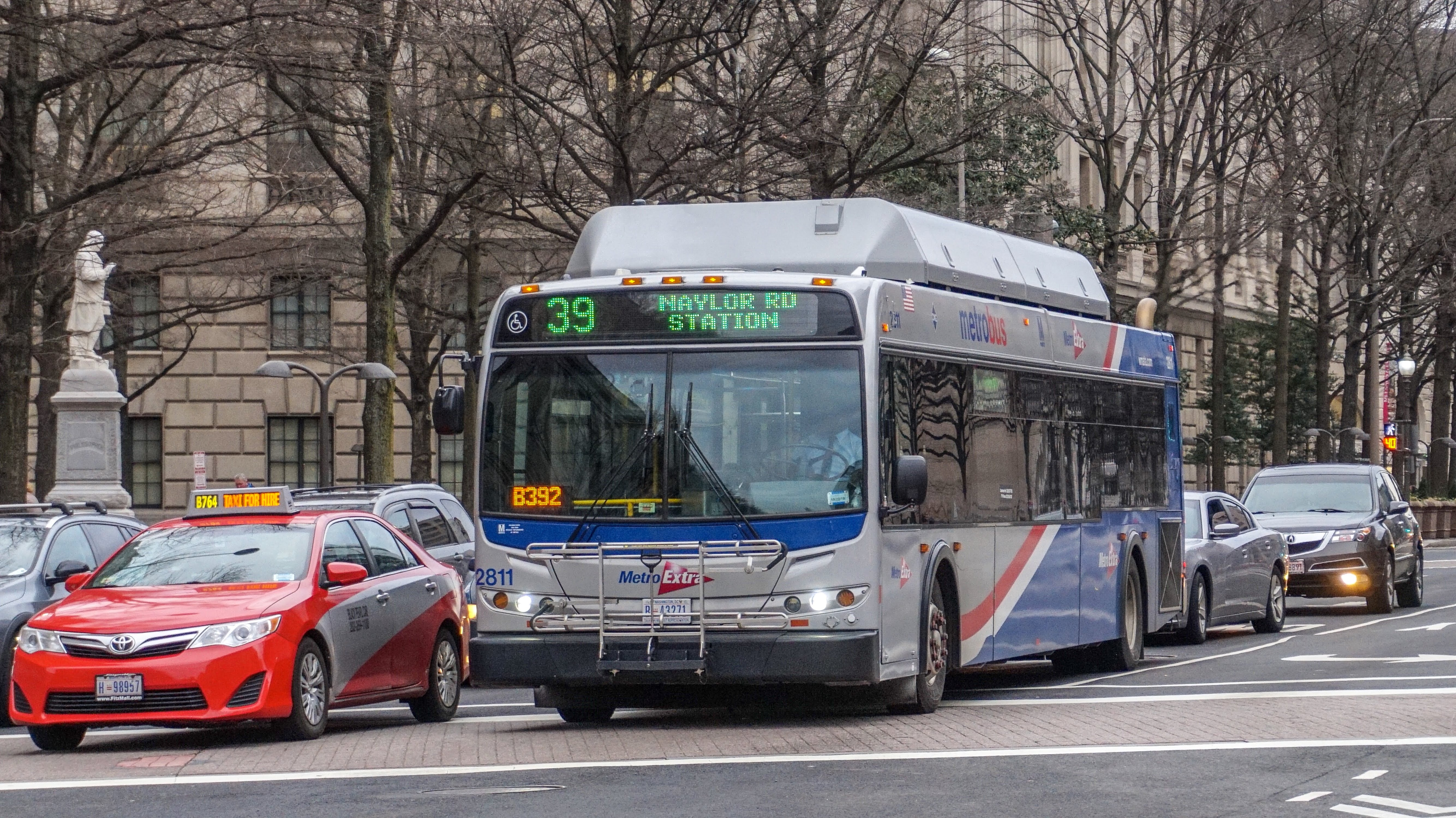
- MetroExtra route 39 bus in 2018
- Parent: WMATA
- Founded: March 19, 2007; 17 years ago
- Ceased operation: June 29, 2025
- Headquarters: Washington, D.C., US
- Locale: Washington Metropolitan Area
- Service type: Express, limited-stop
- Routes: 6
- Operator: WMATA
- Manager: Randy Clarke

MetroExtra was a limited-stop service operated by the Washington Metropolitan Area Transit Authority, which operates on Metrobus lines that need extra service with faster trips. There were six MetroExtra routes with only two of them having daily service.

== History ==
The service began in 2007 with an express service of the Georgia Avenue-7th Street Line, 79. The route would follow its local counterpart but only serve the most important stops.

In 2008, a study was released along the 16th Street corridor to improve the line by both WMATA and the District Department of Transportation. The corridor averages a weekday ridership of 16,000 making it the third most heavily used line in the Metrobus system, Parts of the proposal were to create a new route S3 which would be shortened routes S1, S2, and S4, and create a limited stop route S9. These 2 routes would then become the most popular MetroExtra routes.

On September 29, 2002, route 16Y began service, the first bus route to provide service in Downtown Washington since 1983. However, it didn't become a MetroExtra route until 2012 (along with route 16F). When route 16X discontinued in 2018, route 16Y became the only MetroExtra to operate in Virginia.

In 2015, WMATA proposed a new MetroExtra route, Q9. The route would provide limited stop service supplementing the Veirs Mill Road Line. The route would operate between Rockville station and Wheaton station and be the first Metro Extra route to operate exclusively in Montgomery County, Maryland.

During the COVID-19 pandemic, all MetroExtra routes except Route 79 were suspended beginning on March 18, 2020. Routes 16Y, 37, 39, 59, A9, G9, J4, K9, X9 were suspended beginning on March 16, 2020, and Route S9 was suspended beginning on March 18, 2020. Weekend service for Route 79 was also suspended beginning on March 21, 2020. Normal service resumed on Routes 59, 79, S9, and X9 beginning on August 23, 2020. Routes 16Y and K9 would also return to service on September 5, 2021. However Routes 37, 39, A9, G9, and J4 were never brought back into service.

The MetroExtra branding was discontinued following the implementation of WMATA's Better Bus Redesign Network on June 29, 2025 with all MetroExtra routes being renamed into Express (59, 79, K9, S9, X9), turned into local routes (16Y), or were eliminated.

== Fleet ==
When MetroExtra service began, services were operated by a dedicated fleet of buses, painted in a blue color scheme with MetroExtra logos.

Image	Builder and model	Model year	Length	Numbers (Total)	Fuel type	Notes
	New Flyer Industries; C40LF	2002	40 ft (12 m)	2464 (1 bus)	CNG	Repainted in 2010.; Retired in 2015
	DaimlerChrysler; Commercial Buses; Orion VII (07.501) (semi-low floor)	2005-2006	40 ft (12 m)	2528, 2563, 2603, 2616, 2626-2629, 2636, 2640-2641, 2643-2644, 2646-2647, 2650-2651, 2655, 2663, 2665, 2668, 2670-2671, 2677-2685 (32 buses)	CNG	2528, 2563, 2603, 2616, 2626-2629, 2636, 2640-2641, 2643-2644, 2646-2647, 2650-2651, 2655, 2663, 2665, 2668, 2670-2671 repainted into MetroExtra scheme between 2010-2012.; 2677-2685 repainted into MetroExtra scheme in 2014.; Retired between 2019-2020
	New Flyer Industries; DE40LFR	2006	40 ft (12 m)	6040 (1 bus)	Diesel-electric hybrid	Repainted in 2012 following an accident; Retired in 2021
	New Flyer; DE40LFA	2009	42 ft (13 m)	6413–6461 (49 buses)	Diesel-electric hybrid	Most units retired between 2022-2025
	New Flyer; DE40LFA	2010	42 ft (13 m)	6462–6472 (11 buses)	Diesel-electric hybrid	Repainted into MetroExtra colors in 2018
	New Flyer; Xcelsior XDE40	2011	40 ft (12 m)	7086–7100 (15 buses)	Diesel-electric hybrid	7086-7090 repainted into MetroExtra colors in 2014; Repainted back into local scheme in 2020.; 7091-7100 delivered in MetroExtra colors; Repainted into local scheme in 2020.; Final buses delivered in MetroExtra colors

== Routes ==
MetroExtra routes follow the same numbering as local Metrobus routes. Although, they typically end with a 9.

- MetroExtra routes in Washington, D.C. have either a two digit number (59, 79) or a letter followed by a 9 (S9, X9)
- MetroExtra routes in Montgomery County, MD have a letter followed by a 9 (K9, S9, Q9)
- MetroExtra routes exist in Prince George's County, MD but are mainly in Montgomery County or Washington, D.C. so no route follows the rule of having a letter followed by two numbers (F12, J12, P12, etc.)
- MetroExtra routes in Northern Virginia have one or two numbers followed by a letter. Although there is only one MetroExtra route in Virginia and the only MetroExtra route to not have a 9. (16Y)

Route	Terminals			Streets traveled	Service notes	Divisions	Local counterpart
59; 14th Street Line	Takoma station	↔	Federal Triangle station	14th Street		Bladensburg	59
79; Georgia Avenue-7th Street Line	Silver Spring station	↔	Archives-Navy Memorial-Penn Quarter	Georgia Avenue; 7th Street	Daily service	Montgomery	70
16Y; Columbia Pike Line	Barcroft	↔	McPherson Square station	Columbia Pike; Arlington Boulevard; K Street		Four Mile Run	16A, 16C, 16E; 16M; 3Y
K9; New Hampshire Avenue-Maryland Line	Fort Totten station	↔	FDA	New Hampshire Avenue		Montgomery	K6
S9; 16th Street Line	Silver Spring station	↔	McPherson Square station	16th Street	Daily service	Montgomery	S2; D31
X9; Benning Road-H Street Line	Capitol Heights station	↔	Gallery Place-Chinatown	Minnesota Avenue; Nannie Helen Burroughs Avenue; Benning Road; H Street	Midday trips terminate at Minnesota Avenue station	Andrews Federal Center	X2; V2, V4

== Former routes ==
These routes have existed in the past but were discontinued. However, most local service along these routes remained.

Route	Terminals			Streets traveled	Service notes	Divisions	Local counterpart
16F, 16X; Columbia Pike Line	Culmore	↔	Federal Triangle station	Columbia Pike		Four Mile Run	16B, 16S
37; Wisconsin Avenue Line	Friendship Heights station	↔	Archives-Navy Memorial-Penn Quarter	Wisconsin Avenue; Massachusetts Avenue		Montgomery	31, 33
39; Pennsylvania Avenue Line	Naylor Road station	↔	Potomac Park	Pennsylvania Avenue		Andrews Federal Center	32, 36; F14
A9; Anacostia-Livingston Line	Livingston	↔	McPherson Square station	Martin Luther King Jr Avenue		Shepherd Parkway	A6, A7, A8
G9; Rhode Island Avenue Line	Mount Rainier Terminal	↔	McPherson Square station	Rhode Island Avenue		Bladensburg	G8; 83, 86
J4; Bethesda-Silver Spring Line	Bethesda station	↔	College Park-U of Md	University Boulevard; East-West Highway		Montgomery	J1, J2
W9; Anacostia-Fort Drum Line	L'Enfant Plaza station	↔	Douglas A. Munro Coast Guard Headquarters Building	South Capitol Street		Shepherd Parkway	A4
