= East West Highway–Old Georgetown Road Line =

Daily bus route operated by the WMATA

M70
- East-West Highway–Old Georgetown Road Line

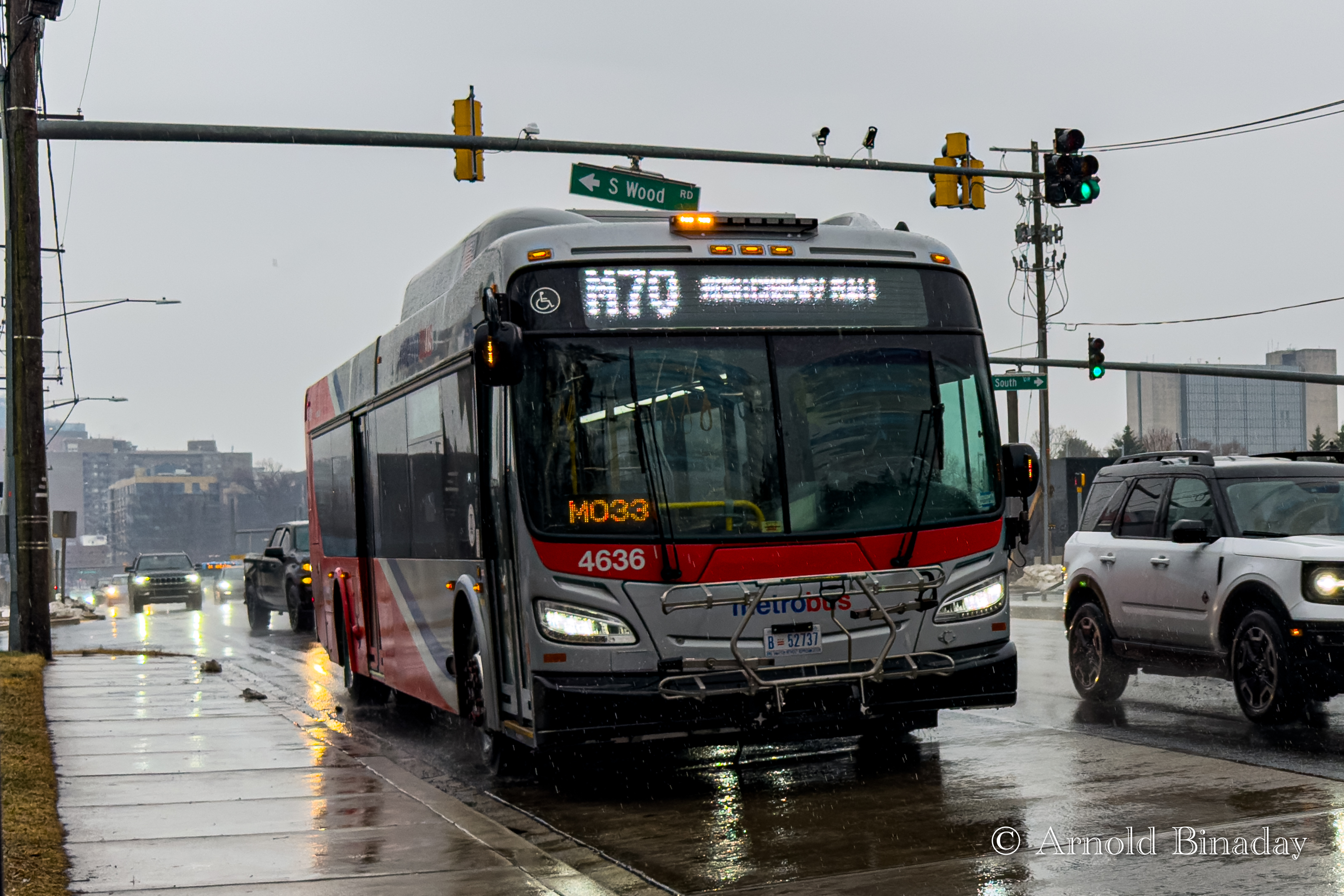
- Route M70 at Medical Center station

Overview
- System: Metrobus
- Operator: Washington Metropolitan Area Transit Authority
- Garage: Montgomery
- Livery: Local
- Status: In Service
- Began service: 1970s
- Predecessors: J1, J2

Route
- Locale: Montgomery County
- Communities served: Silver Spring, Chevy Chase, Bethesda
- Landmarks served: Westfield Montgomery, Walter Johnson High School, National Institutes of Health, Medical Center station, Walter Reed Naval Medical Center, Marriott International Headquarters, Bethesda station, Bethesda-Chevy Chase High School, Rock Creek Forest, Silver Spring station
- Start: Westfield Montgomery Transit Center
- Via: Democracy Boulevard, Old Georgetown Road, West Cedar Lane, Wisconsin Avenue/Rockville Pike, East-West Highway
- End: Silver Spring station

Service
- Level: Daily
- Frequency: 10 minutes (Weekday peak hours); 12 minutes (6AM-9PM daily); 15-30 minutes (Before 6 AM, After 9 PM)
- Journey time: 40 minutes
- Operates: 4:45 AM - 2:00 AM
- Ridership: 114,626 (J1, FY 2025); 1,638,318 (J2, FY 2025)
- Transfers: SmarTrip only
- Timetable: East West Highway-Old Georgetown Road Line

The East West Highway–Old Georgetown Road Line, designated Route M70, is a daily bus route operated by the Washington Metropolitan Area Transit Authority between Silver Spring station of the Red Line of the Washington Metro and Westfield Montgomery Transit Center. This route replaced the former Bethesda–Silver Spring Line consisting of routes J1 and J2. The M70 follows roughly the same routing as the previous J2 route, except that westbound buses do not serve the bus loop at Medical Center Station and instead stop across the street along Rockville Pike.

== Background ==
Route M70 operates between Silver Spring station and Montgomery Mall connecting passengers along the East-West Highway and Old Georgetown Road corridor. The route operates daily with frequencies of every 10 minutes during weekday peak hours, every 12 minutes off-peak and weekend daytime, and frequencies of every 30 minutes at all other times. The route operates out of the Montgomery division.

=== Stops ===
Bus stop	Direction	Connections
Montgomery County, Maryland
Silver Spring Bus Bay 102	Westbound stop, Eastbound terminal	Metrobus: C87, D40, D4X, D60, D6X, M20, M52, M54, P30; Ride On: 1, 2, 4, 5, 8, 9, 11, 12, 13, 14, 15, 16, 17, 18, 19, 20, 21, 22, 28, Flash BRT (Blue, Orange); MTA Maryland Bus: 915, 929; Shuttle-UM: 111; Peter Pan Bus; Washington Metro: MARC: Brunswick Line; MTA: Purple Line (Planned)
East-West Highway / Colesville Road	Westbound	Ride On: 1, 2, 11, 28
East-West Highway / East Falkland Lane	Eastbound	Ride On: 1, 2, 11, 28
East-West Highway / Summit Hills Apartments	Bidirectional	Ride On: 1, 2, 11
East-West Highway / #1705	Westbound	Ride On: 1, 2, 11
East-West Highway / Rosemary Hills Drive	Bidirectional	Ride On: 1, 2, 11
East-West Highway / Washington Avenue	Eastbound	Ride On: 1, 2, 11
East-West Highway / Sundale Drive	Westbound	Ride On: 1, 2, 11
East-West Highway / Grubb Road	Bidirectional	Ride On: 1, 11
East-West Highway / Ellingson Drive	Bidirectional	Ride On: 11
East-West Highway / Meadowbrook Lane	Bidirectional	Ride On: 1, 11
East-West Highway / Beach Drive	Eastbound	Ride On: 1, 11
East-West Highway / Jones Mill Road	Westbound	Ride On: 1, 11
East-West Highway / Rocton Avenue	Westbound	Ride On: 1, 11
East-West Highway / Brookville Road	Eastbound	Ride On: 1, 11
East-West Highway / Cypress Place	Bidirectional	Ride On: 1, 11
East-West Highway / Connecticut Avenue	Bidirectional	Metrobus: M22; Ride On: 1, 11
East-West Highway / Maple Avenue	Bidirectional	Metrobus: M22
Montgomery Avenue / East-West Highway	Eastbound	Metrobus: M22
East-West Highway / Chelton Road	Westbound	Metrobus: M22
Montgomery Avenue / Waverly Street	Eastbound	Metrobus: M22
East-West Highway / Waverly Street	Westbound	Metrobus: M22
Montgomery Lane / East Lane	Eastbound	Metrobus: D96, M22; Fairfax Connector: 798
Bethesda Bus Bay C	Bidirectional	Metrobus: D96, M22; Ride On: 29, 30, 32, 34, 36, 47, 70; Bethesda Circulator; Capital Crescent Trail; Washington Metro: MTA: Purple Line (Planned)
Wisconsin Avenue / Commerce Lane	Eastbound	
Old Georgetown Road / Woodmont Avenue	Westbound	
Woodmont Avenue / Cheltenham Drive	Westbound	
Wisconsin Avenue / Cheltenham Drive	Bidirectional	
Wisconsin Avenue / Highland Avenue	Westbound	
Wisconsin Avenue / Battery Lane	Eastbound	
Wisconsin Avenue / Chelsea Lane	Bidirectional	
Rockville Pike / South Drive Medical Center	Eastbound	Ride On: 30, 33, 34, 46, 70, 101; Fairfax Connector: 798 (Southbound only); NIH Bethesda Shuttles; Navy Medical Center Shuttle; Washington Metro:
Rockville Pike / Wood Road Medical Center	Westbound	Ride On: 30, 33, 34, 46, 70, 101; Fairfax Connector: 798 (Southbound only); NIH Bethesda Shuttles; Navy Medical Center Shuttle; Washington Metro:
Rockville Pike / North Drive	Eastbound	Ride On: 30, 34, 46, 70
West Cedar Lane / Cedarcrest Drive	Bidirectional	Ride On: 70
West Cedar Lane / West Drive	Eastbound	Ride On: 70
West Cedar Lane / Locust Avenue	Westbound	Ride On: 70
West Cedar Lane / Old Georgetown Road	Bidirectional	Ride On: 70
Old Georgetown Road / Alta Vista Road	Bidirectional	
Old Georgetown Road / Beech Avenue	Bidirectional	Ride On: 30
Old Georgetown Road / Wyngate Drive	Eastbound	Ride On: 30
Old Georgetown Road / Ryland Drive	Bidirectional	Ride On: 30
Old Georgetown Road / I-495	Bidirectional	
Old Georgetown Road / Kingswood Road	Bidirectional	
Old Georgetown Road / Manor Oak Way	Westbound	
Old Georgetown Road / Cheshire Drive	Bidirectional	Ride On: 6
Old Georgetown Road / Bells Mill Road	Eastbound	Ride On: 6
Democracy Boulevard / Old Georgetown Road	Westbound	Ride On: 6
Democracy Boulevard / Davis Library	Bidirectional	
Democracy Boulevard / Mayfield Drive	Eastbound	
Democracy Boulevard / Fernwood Road	Bidirectional	
Fernwood Road / Rock Springs Court	Westbound	
Fernwood Road / Thomas Spring Way	Eastbound	Ride On: 96
Fernwood Road / Rock Spring Drive	Westbound	Ride On: 6, 26, 47, 96; MTA Maryland Bus: 505, 515
Fernwood Road / Rockledge Drive	Eastbound	Ride On: 6, 26, 47, 96; MTA Maryland Bus: 505, 515
Montgomery Mall Bus Bay F	Eastbound stop, Westbound terminal	Ride On: 6, 26, 42, 47, 96

== History ==
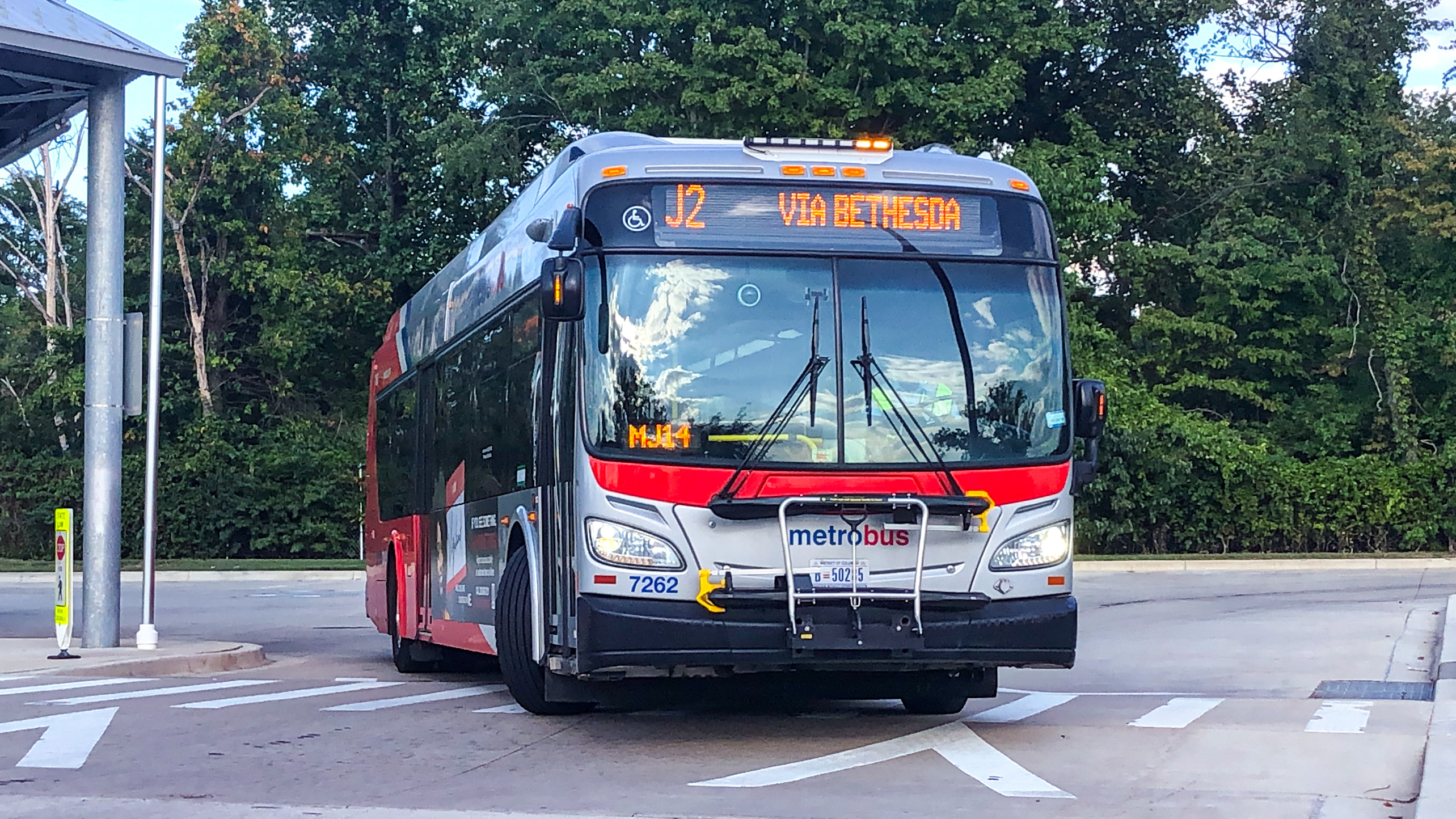
Former Route J2 at Westfield Montgomery Transit Center in 2019

Before WMATA implemented the Better Bus Redesign network, Route M70 was previously known as Routes J1 and J2. The J2 originally operated as a streetcar line with the J4 between Silver Spring and Beltway Plaza Mall. The J2 and J4 were converted to Metrobus routes on February 4, 1973, when WMATA bought out DC Transit and other companies to form Metrobus.

On February 19, 1978, routes J2 and J4 were shortened to Silver Spring station and replaced by routes F4 and F6. Route F4 would operate between Silver Spring and New Carrollton, and route F6 would operate between Silver Spring and Greenbelt, Maryland. Route J2 would operate between Silver Spring and Montgomery Mall while route J4 would operate between Silver Spring and Friendship Heights station.

In addition, routes J1 and J6 would be added to the line. The J1 would operate between Silver Spring station and the National Institutes of Health via Jones Bridge and Jones Mill Roads. The J6 would operate between Silver Spring station and Friendship Heights station via Leland Street and Connecticut Avenue.

On January 22, 1984, route J6 would be discontinued and would be replaced by Ride On routes 1 and 11. On January 27, 1985, route J4 would be discontinued and replaced by a combination of several Ride On and Metrobus routes. On the same day the J4 was eliminated, route J3 would enter service. The J3 would offer supplemental peak direction service between Montgomery Mall and Silver Spring station.

On December 29, 1996, route J1 was extended from Medical Center station to Montgomery Mall to replace route J7. The line would also serve Rock Creek Park.

Due to security concerns following the September 11 Attacks, routes 14B, J1, J2, and J3 were forced to detour near the NIH and Medical Center. Detours goes as the following:

J2, J3 and 14B - westbound Before 6:30 a.m. and after 9:30 a.m. Buses will follow the current routing to Rockville Pike and South Drive, turn left on South Drive, and continue to Medical Center station. Leaving the station, buses will turn right on South Drive, left on W. Cedar Lane, and right on Old Georgetown Road where the current routing will be resumed.

Between 6:30 a.m. - 9:30 a.m. Buses will follow the current routing to Rockville Pike and South Drive, turn left on South Drive, left on Rockville Pike, left on Tuckerman Lane, and left on Old Georgetown Road where the current route will be resumed.

J2, J3 and 14B - eastbound Buses to follow the current routing to Old Georgetown Road and W. Cedar Lane. Buses will turn left on W. Cedar Lane, right on Rockville Pike, right on South Drive, and continue to Medical Center station. Leaving the station, buses will continue on South Drive to Rockville Pike, turn right on Woodmont, and right on Edgemore where the regular routing will be resumed.

J1 - westbound Buses will follow the current routing to Jones Bridge Road and S. University Boulevard. Buses will continue on Jones Bridge Road, turn right on Rockville Pike, and left on South Drive to the station. From the station, buses will continue on South Drive, turn left on Rockville Pike, and left on Tuckerman Lane where the current routing will be resumed.

J1 - eastbound Buses will continue on the regular route to Old Georgetown Road and W. Cedar Lane. Buses will turn left on Cedar Lane, right on Rockville Pike, and right on South Drive to Medical Center station. Buses will leave the station via South Drive, turn right on Rockville Pike, and left on Jones Bridge Road where the regular route will be resumed.

In 2010, during WMATA's FY2011 budget, it was proposed to eliminate route J1 section between Medical Center station and Montgomery Mall as it overlaps route J2 and J3 service. But route J1 will operate in both directions during weekday peak hours.

On December 19, 2010, route J1 was shortened to Medical Center station with service to Montgomery Mall being replaced by routes J2 and J3. Route J1 would operate in both directions during the weekday peak hours between Silver Spring and Medical Center only via Jones Hill Road and Jones Bridge Road.

When the Paul S. Sarbanes Transit Center at Silver Spring station opened on September 20, 2015, routes J1, J2, and J3 were rerouted from their terminus along Wayne Avenue to the new transit center. The J1, J2, and J3 were given Bus Bay 102 on the first level when it opened.

In 2016, during WMATA's FY2018 budget year, WMATA proposed to eliminate route J1 to reduce costs. There will be no alternative service along Jones Mill Road and Jones Bridge Road, and reduced service at Medical Center station and along East-West Highway between Jones Mill Road and Silver Spring station. Performance measures for the line goes as follows:

Performance Measures	Routes J5	WMATA Guideline	Pass/Fail
Weekday Daily Riders	6,112	>432	Pass
Cost Recovery	31.3%	>16.6%	Pass
Subsidy/Rider	$2.57	<$4.81	Pass
Riders per Rev Trip	31.0	>10.7	Pass
Riders per Rev Mile	3.3	>1.3	Pass

According to WMATA, the portion of Route J1 exclusive to Jones Mill Road and Jones Bridge Road has 3.54 boardings per revenue trip based on Automatic Passenger Counter data during the August 2016 Schedule Period (August 21-December 18), which does not meet the WMATA standard 10.7 riders per trip. Alternative service would be provided by routes J2 and J3 at Medical Center station and along East-West Highway, route L8 at Jones Bridge Road and Connecticut Avenue, and Ride On route 33 on Jones Bridge Road between Connecticut Ave and Medical Center station. However the proposal did not go through.

In 2017, WMATA proposed to re-extend route J1 back to Montgomery Mall to replace route J3 via its old routing before the 2010 route shortening. But route J1 would revert to operating in the weekday peak hour direction only. According to WMATA, it states the following reasons:

- Respond to customer demand. Current travel patterns on the J1 indicate strong demand in the peak direction of travel: westbound during morning rush hours and eastbound during afternoon rush hours. J1 trips in the reverse flow direction (eastbound during morning rush hours and westbound during afternoon rush hours) have low ridership.
- Extending route J1 to Montgomery Mall will provide connections to a trip generator utilizing resources from the eliminated eastbound morning and westbound afternoon trips.
- Travel times to Montgomery Mall via the J1 will provide current route J2 and J3 customers to and from Silver Spring with a faster travel option.
- Eliminating the J3 reduces service redundancy and allows the ability to adjust service levels to meet demand on Route J1.
- With the elimination of the J3, the J1 along Rockledge Drive would be adjusted in response to customer demand between Medical Center and Rockledge Drive, and service on the J2 would be adjusted in response to customer demand along East-West Highway and Bethesda station.

According to performance measures, it goes as follows:

Performance Measures	Routes J1, J2, J3	WMATA Guideline	Pass/Fail
Weekday Daily Riders	5,381	>432	Pass
Cost Recovery	24.11%	>16.6%	Pass
Subsidy/Rider	$2.96	<$4.81	Pass
Riders per Rev Trip	27.6	>10.7	Pass
Riders per Rev Mile	3.01	>1.3	Pass

Average weekday J1 riders that'll be affected by the proposal goes as the following according to WMATA:

Performance Measures	Route J1	WMATA Guideline	Pass/Fail
Morning Rush Hour Eastbound Riders per Trip	10.2	10.7	Fail
Morning Rush Hour Eastbound Riders per trip Jones Mill/Jones Bridge	1.9	10.7	Fail
Afternoon Rush Hour Westbound Riders per Trip	8.3	10.7	Fail
Afternoon Rush Hour Westbound Riders per trip Jones Mill/Jones Bridge	0.4	10.7	Fail

At the time of the proposed changes, route J1 operated in both directions during the peak hours while route J3 operate in the peak direction only.

On June 24, 2018, route J1 was re-extended back to Montgomery Mall via its old routing before the 2010 changes. The route also reverted to operating in the weekday peak hour direction only as well which was the same before 2010. Route J3 was discontinued and replaced by both routes J1 and J2 as a result.

During the COVID-19 pandemic, the line was reduced to operate on its Saturday supplemental schedule beginning on March 16, 2020, with all J1 service being suspended. However beginning on March 18, 2020, the J2 was further reduced to operate on its Sunday schedule. Weekend service was also reduced for the J2 beginning on March 21, 2020, operating every 30 minutes. The line restored its full schedule beginning on August 23, 2020 with the J1 also returning to service.

On September 5, 2021, service was increased to operate every 12 minutes daily between 7:00 AM to 9:00 PM..

In 2024 during WMATA's FY2024 Budget crisis, WMATA proposed to eliminate all J1 service. However on April 25, 2024, Metro’s Board of Directors approved a $4.8 billion capital and operating budget which avoided service cuts.

=== Better Bus Redesign ===
In 2022, WMATA launched its Better Bus Redesign project, which aimed to redesign the entire Metrobus Network and is the first full redesign of the agency's bus network in its history.

In April 2023, WMATA launched its Draft Visionary Network. As part of the drafts, WMATA proposed to modify the J2 to remain along Old Georgetown Road and no longer operate along West Cedar Lane, Wisconsin Avenue, Medical Center station, or Battery Lane. The line was named Route MD140.

A new Route MD340 was also introduced alongside Route MD140, which would operate between Silver Spring station and Potomac via the J2 routing between Silver Spring station and Bethesda station via East-West Highway and Montgomery Avenue, then would operate along Old Georgetown Road, Arlington Road, Bradley Boulevard, Goldsboro Road, and River Road to Potomac Village Shopping Center.

Route J1 was eliminated during the proposals, with service along Jones Bridge Road partially combined with Route L8 and renamed to Route MD341, which operated between Friendship Heights station and Leisure World Clubhouse via Wisconsin Avenue, Bethesda station, Jones Bridge Road, Connecticut Avenue, Bel Pre Road, Aspen Hill, and Georgia Avenue. Service inside Rock Creek Park was covered by Ride On routes 6 and 96.

During WMATA's Revised Draft Visionary Network, WMATA renamed the MD140 to Route M70, keeping its same routing. Route MD340 was renamed to Route M82 and was rerouted to follow the current T2 routing to Friendship Heights station instead of Silver Spring station, and operate between Friendship Heights and Rockville station. Route MD341 was dropped from the proposal entirely in favor of Route M22. All changes were then proposed during WMATA's 2025 Proposed Network.

During the proposal, WMATA rerouted the proposed Route M70 to operate along West Cedar Lane, Wisconsin Avenue, and Medical Center station, making the route almost identical to the current Route J2. However, the route would no longer enter the Medical Center Station bus loop or serve Battery Lane.

On November 21, 2024, WMATA approved its Better Bus Redesign Network.

Beginning on June 29, 2025, Route J1 was eliminated, and the J2 was renamed to the M70, keeping the same routing, with the exception that it no longer enters the Medical Center Station bus loop. The Battery Lane deviation during AM rush hour was also discontinued following a signal adjustment to allow buses to turn left onto West Cedar Lane at all times of the day.

== Incidents ==
- On June 6, 2016, a J2 bus slammed into two trees along East-West Highway near Grubb Road after hitting a pick-up truck. The driver suffered serious injuries. 12 passengers were also hurt. The bus (XDE40 7255) suffered major damage to its front.
