= College Park–Bethesda Line =

J4
- College Park–Bethesda Line

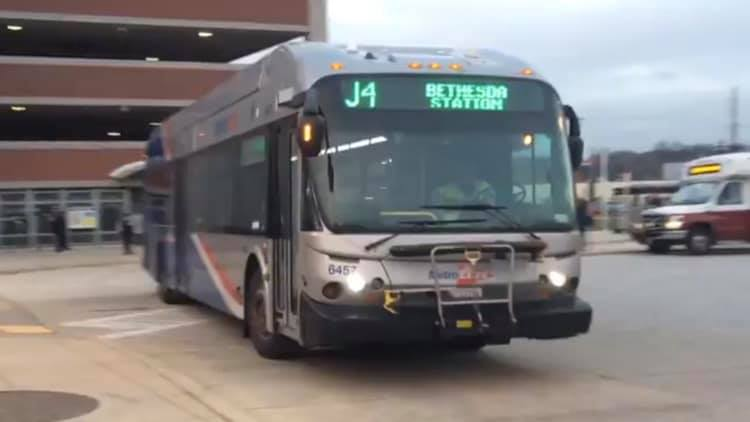
- A New Flyer DE40LFA (6457) running on the J4

Overview
- System: Metrobus
- Operator: Washington Metropolitan Area Transit Authority
- Garage: Montgomery
- Livery: MetroExtra
- Status: Discontinued
- Began service: April 15, 2002
- Ended service: Suspended as of March 16, 2020; Discontinued by September 5, 2021

Route
- Locale: Prince George's County, Montgomery County
- Communities served: College Park, University Of Maryland, Langley Park, Takoma Park, Silver Spring, Chevy Chase, Maryland, Bethesda
- Landmarks served: College Park–University of Maryland station, University Of Maryland, Langley Park, Takoma Park, Maryland, Takoma Langley Crossroads Transit Center, Silver Spring station, Rock Creek Forest, Chevy Chase, Maryland, Bethesda station
- Start: College Park–University of Maryland station
- Via: River Road, Paint Branch Parkway, Campus Drive, University Boulevard, New Hampshire Avenue, Piney Branch Road, Flower Avenue, Wayne Avenue, Colesville Road, East-West Highway
- End: Bethesda station

Service
- Level: Weekday Peak Hour Service Only
- Frequency: 20 minutes
- Operates: 5:20 AM – 9:30 AM, 3:25 PM – 7:45 PM
- Transfers: SmarTrip only
- Timetable: College Park–Bethesda Line

The College Park–Bethesda Line, designated Route J4, was a rush hour-only MetroExtra bus route operated by the Washington Metropolitan Area Transit Authority between the College Park–University of Maryland station of the Green and Yellow Lines of the Washington Metro and Bethesda station of the Red Line of the Washington Metro. The J4 operated throughout the neighborhoods in Prince George's and Montgomery counties in Maryland.

== Route description and service ==
The J4 operated from Montgomery Division every 20 minutes from 5:20 AM – 9:30 AM and 3:25 PM – 7:45 PM on weekday rush hours, operating from both directions. Service operated limited stops along Woodmont Avenue, Montgomery Lane, Montgomery Avenue, East West Highway, Colesville Road, Wayne Avenue, Flower Avenue, Branch Road, and University Boulevard, Campus Drive, Stadium Drive, Regents Drive, and River Road. The first two westbound trips operated along Valley Drive and Union Drive inside University of Maryland. The J4 served all stops in College Park, Maryland between University of Maryland, College Park and College Park–University of Maryland station, while it had limited stops north of College Park to Bethesda, Maryland.

== History ==
Route J4 operated between Bethesda and Beltway Plaza Mall until 1978 when it was shorten to operate between Silver Spring station and Bethesda being replaced by route F6. Around the 1980s, route J4 was extended to Montgomery Mall to serve alongside the Bethesda-Silver Spring Line with routes the J1, J2, and J6. However the route was discontinued in the 1990s.

In the late 1990s to early 2000s, the Maryland Department of Transportation had a goal of providing service between College Park and Bethesda. Maryland already implement the C8 between Glenmont and College Park and later extended to White Flint in 2000. The Purple Line was mentioned during the 1990s but with high construction costs and delays led the project to be in the talks until construction began in 2017. Originally, the plan between College Park and Bethesda was to have an Bus rapid transit opposed to a light rail.

While the purple line was still in talks, WMATA and the MTA created route J4 to operate between College Park station and Bethesda station on April 15, 2002. Route J4 was created in order to meet the Maryland Department of Transportation's goal of providing better transportation between the University of Maryland and various places throughout Montgomery County, Maryland.

Route J4 was also created by WMATA to provide limited stop service between the College Park–University of Maryland station and Bethesda station via the University of Maryland, Langley Park, and the Silver Spring station, which the Maryland Department of Transportation originally had as a goal for its Purple Line light rail trains to operate on. However, since the Purple Line was yet to be built and had a long way to go in terms of getting the necessary funding and approval from Prince George's County, and Montgomery County. The J4 provides extra service for the J1 and J2 along East-West Highway and C2, C4 along University Boulevard. The J4 becomes a local route between the University Of Maryland and College Park station serving all stops.

The J4 became a MetroExtra route in 2007, as part of increasing more service from Routes J1 and J3. This brings faster service on the J4, as the MetroExtra conversion is part of a collaboration between the MTA and WMATA.

With the Silver Spring Transit Center's opening in 2015, J4 going Eastbound was given Bus Bay 223 on Level 2 along with the F4, while J4 going Westbound was given Bus Bay 102 on Level 1 along with routes J1 & J2 .

When the Takoma Langley Crossroads Transit Center opened on December 22, 2016, the J4 was rerouted, along with several other Metrobus, Ride On buses, Shuttle-UM and TheBus routes, to serve the newly opened Transit Center. Route J4 would serve Bus Bay A.

Beginning on September 1, 2019 for nine months, the College Park Metrobus loop was temporarily closed for construction of the Purple line at College Park station having all stops located along River Road. As of a result, route J4 was temporarily rerouted along River Road having to turn around on the roundabout along Haig Drive to return to its regular route going to Bethesda.

All route J4 service was suspended due to WMATA's response to the COVID-19 pandemic beginning on March 16, 2020.

Beginning on April 20, 2020, parts of Calvert Road was closed due to the ongoing construction of the Purple line, route J4 was expected to be temporarily rerouted along US Route 1 and to turn on Calvert Road to serve the west side of College Park–University of Maryland station since vehicles cannot travel along parts of Calvert Road had it returned to service. However the reroute has not operated due to the 2019-20 COVID-19 outbreak and Metro's reduced service since March 13.

On September 26, 2020, WMATA proposed to eliminate all route J4 service due to low federal funding. Route J4 has not operated since March 13, 2020 due to Metro's response to the COVID-19 pandemic. By September 5, 2021, all remaining suspended routes, including the J4 were no longer listed on WMATA's website.

Despite its elimination, the line was essentially a pre-curser for the upcoming Purple Line between College Park and Bethesda, with construction beginning in 2017, reflecting the general route while enhancing service with modernized stations and faster headways. The Purple Line is expected to open in late 2027 with the line being a direct replacement to the former Route J4.
