= Long Branch (Silver Spring, Maryland) =

Coordinates: 39.000°N 76.995°W

Long Branch, Maryland
- Unincorporated community
- Interactive map of Long Branch, Maryland
- Country: United States
- State: Maryland
- County: Montgomery

Long Branch is an unincorporated community and commercial district located in the eastern portion of Silver Spring, within Montgomery County, Maryland, United States.

== Location ==
The area is centered along Long Branch Road (Maryland Route 193) and is recognized for its ethnically diverse population and its role as a local retail and transit-oriented corridor.

Long Branch is not an incorporated municipality and has no formally defined boundaries; instead, it is generally understood through historical usage, commercial activity, and planning designations used by Montgomery County.

== Infrastructure ==
=== Libraries ===
Long Branch Library located on Garland Ave serves the immediate community is part of the Montgomery County Public Libraries.

=== Parks ===
There are 10 parks in the Long Branch neighborhood managed by Montgomery Parks, a division of the Maryland-National Capital Park and Planning Commission (M-NCPPC).

Park Name	Address
Long Branch Stream Valley Park (Units 1 & 2)	Land along Long Branch stream corridor
Upper Long Branch Neighborhood Park	9335 Wilmer Street, Silver Spring, MD 20901
Long Branch–Wayne Local Park	509 E. University Blvd., Silver Spring, MD 20901
Long Branch–Arliss Neighborhood Park	8810 Garland Avenue, Silver Spring, MD 20901
Long Branch Local Park	8700 Piney Branch Road, Silver Spring, MD 20901
Flower Avenue Urban Park	8746 Flower Avenue, Silver Spring, MD 20910
Long Branch–Garland Neighborhood Park	8601 Garland Avenue, Silver Spring, MD 20912
Seek Lane Neighborhood Park	701 Seek Lane, Takoma Park, MD 20912
New Hampshire Estates Neighborhood Park	8825 Piney Branch Rd, Silver Spring, MD 20903

==== Long Branch Parks Initiative ====
The Long Branch Parks Initiative is a planning effort led by Montgomery Parks to improve and coordinate public parks in the Long Branch neighborhood of Silver Spring, Maryland. The plan selected ten parks along the Long Branch stream corridor for park renovations, trail connectivity, environmental improvements, and new amenities. There are several projects moving forward into design and implementation.

=== Recreation Center ===
Montgomery County Parks operates the Long Branch Community Center within the Long Branch Local Park. The center was temporarily utilized as a shelter for the homeless population during the COVID-19 pandemic. In 2022, the community center resumed normal operations following a renovation.

=== Transportation ===
Long Branch is served primarily by bus transportation provided by Montgomery County's Ride On system, including Routes 14, 15, and 16, which operate along Piney Branch Road and University Boulevard and connect the community to Silver Spring Transit Center, Takoma Metrorail station, and the Takoma–Langley Crossroads area. Additional WMATA Metrobus routes operate on nearby arterial roads, providing regional connections. The nearest Metrorail access is the Red Line at Silver Spring station, which is accessible by bus. The Maryland Purple Line light rail, currently under construction, is planned to include a Long Branch station near Arliss Street and Piney Branch Road, providing future east–west service between Bethesda and New Carrollton.
