= Medical Center station (Washington Metro) =

Washington Metro station

Medical Center
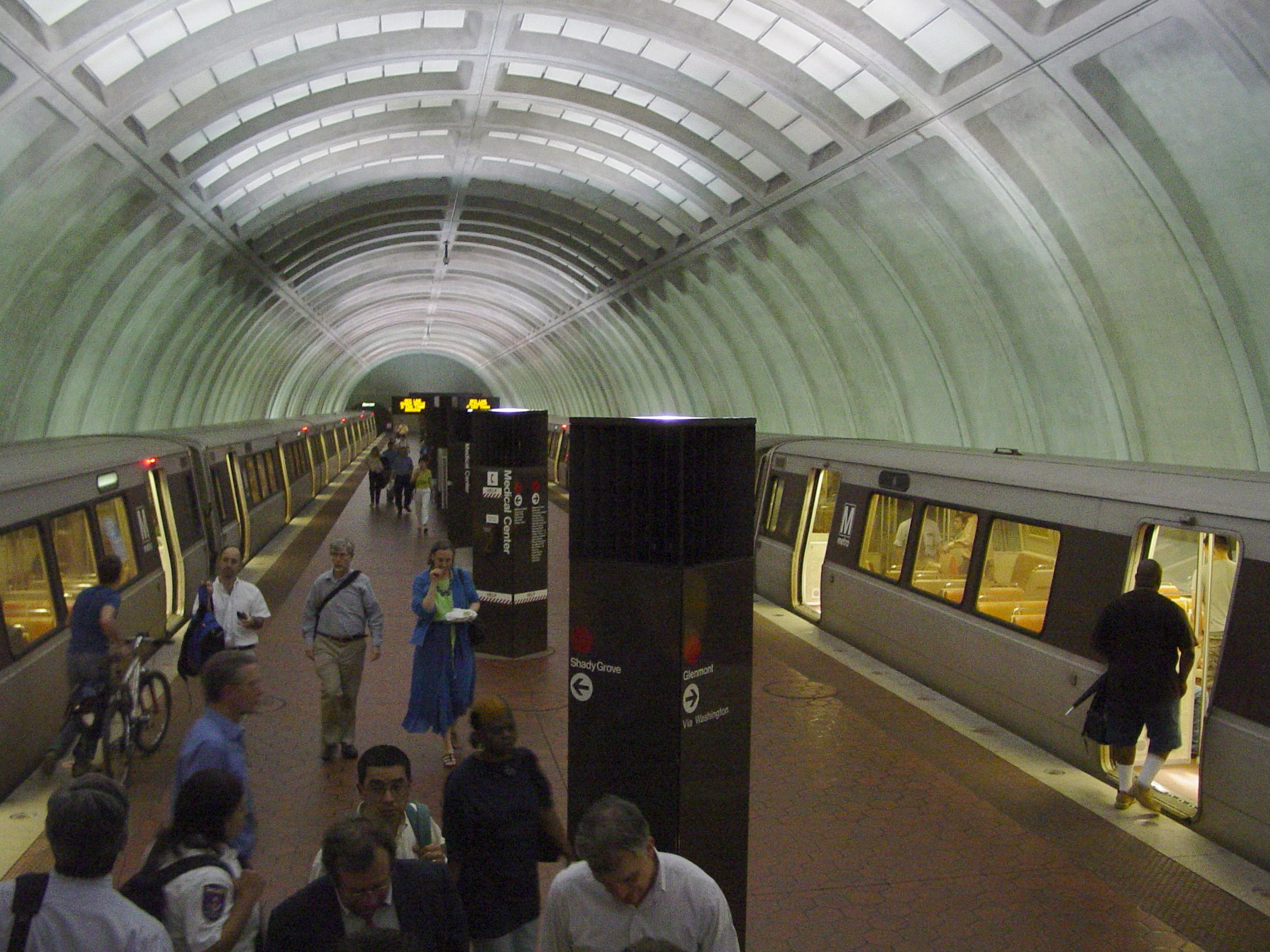
- Medical Center station platform in June 2004

General information
- Location: Bethesda, Maryland, U.S.
- Coordinates: 38.999067°N 77.097676°W
- Owner: Washington Metropolitan Area Transit Authority
- Platforms: 1 island platform
- Tracks: 2
- Connections: Ride On: 30, 33, 34, 46, 70, 101; Metrobus: M70; Fairfax Connector: 798; NIH Bethesda Shuttles

Construction
- Structure type: Underground
- Depth: 120 ft (37 m)
- Cycle facilities: Capital Bikeshare, 88 racks, 38 lockers
- Accessible: Yes

Other information
- Station code: A10

History
- Opened: August 25, 1984; 42 years ago

Passengers
- 2025: 3,567 (average weekday)
- Rank: 51 of 98

Services
Preceding station	Washington Metro	Following station
Grosvenor–Strathmore toward Shady Grove	Red Line	Bethesda toward Glenmont
Route map
Location

Medical Center station is a Washington Metro station in Bethesda, Maryland, United States. The island-platformed station was opened on August 25, 1984, and is operated by the Washington Metropolitan Area Transit Authority (WMATA). Providing service for the Red Line, the station serves the National Institutes of Health campus and the Walter Reed National Military Medical Center and is located at Rockville Pike and South Drive. Since there is little retail in the area and no commuter parking lot, this station is used almost exclusively by employees and visitors to those two institutions.

== History ==
The station opened on August 25, 1984. Its opening coincided with the completion of 6.8 miles (10.9 km) of rail northwest of the Van Ness–UDC station and the opening of the Bethesda, Friendship Heights, Grosvenor–Strathmore, and Tenleytown stations.

In September 2009, the Montgomery County government submitted a $20 million federal grant application to build a pedestrian tunnel under Rockville Pike (MD 355) to improve access to the Medical Center stop from Walter Reed Medical Center. There used to only be a crosswalk there, with many passengers crossing the heavily travelled street from Walter Reed on the east side of MD 355 to get to the station on the west side. Construction would have originally occurred in 2011, but the project was not approved until 2013. The project was fully funded at $68 million, mostly through the Department of Defense, and included installation of new deep elevators, improvement of surface bicycle and pedestrian facilities, as well as an extension of the left turn lane on southbound MD 355. The project began construction in 2017. The elevators and staircases of the MD 355 crossing underpass opened in late 2021 and the east side elevators to mezzanine, another elevator to platform, and a new staircase opened on February 25, 2022.

In May 2026 WMATA announced that the Bethesda, Medical Center and Grosvenor–Strathmore stations will be closed July 6 to September 6, 2026, to allow for completion of Red Line construction projects.

== Station layout ==
Medical Center is the last underground station heading towards Shady Grove, as north of this station, it emerges from the tunnel onto a brief elevated section, crossing the Capital Beltway. The station is one of 11 stations in the system constructed with rock tunneling and is accordingly deeper underground than most stations in the system. Its platform is located 114 feet (35 m) below its west entrance and more than 120 feet (37 m) below street level.

Unlike most other Red Line stations, the escalator bank emerges above ground outside, rather than in a subterranean landing. These escalators are located at the southwest corner of Rockville Pike and South Drive, where bus bays and a kiss and ride lot are also located. The escalators are 202 feet (62 m) long and rise 101 feet (31 m) from the mezzanine to the entrance landing.
