= Westfield Montgomery =

Shopping mall in Bethesda, Maryland, U.S.

Coordinates: 39°01′27″N 77°08′50″W

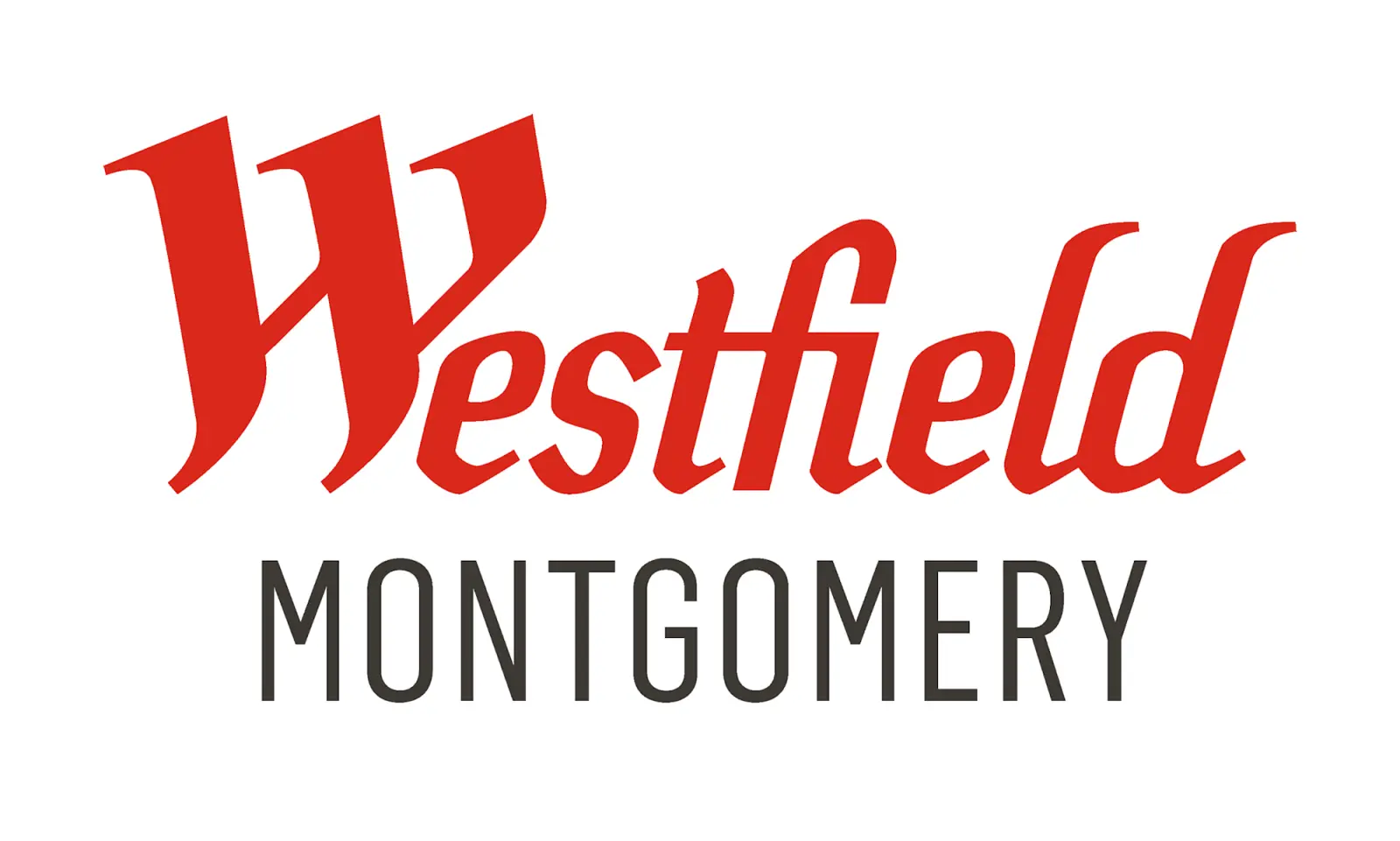

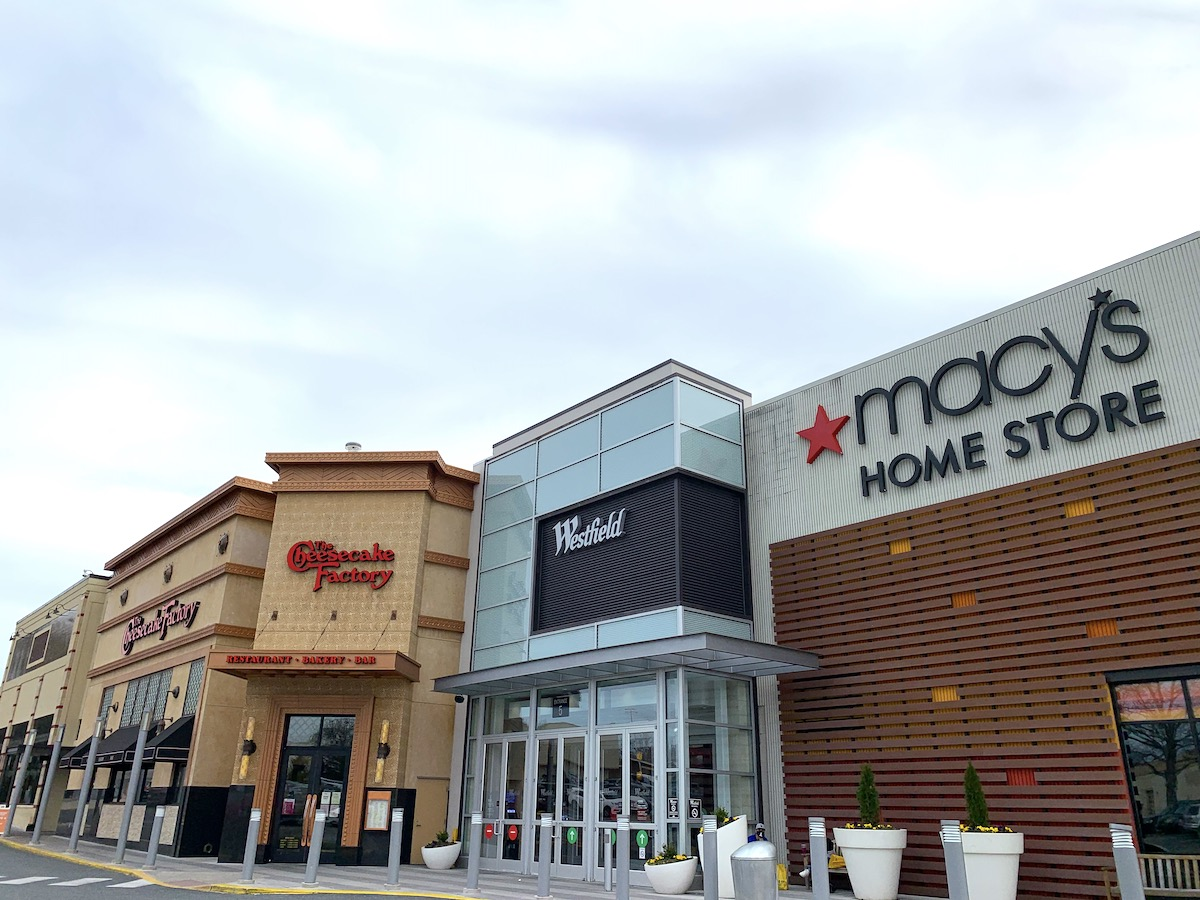
- The exterior entrance of the mall, by The Cheesecake Factory
- Location: Bethesda, Maryland, United States
- Address: 7101 Democracy Boulevard
- Opened: March 6, 1968; 58 years ago
- Developer: May Centers, Inc.; Strouse, Greenberg & Company
- Manager: Unibail-Rodamco-Westfield SE
- Owner: Unibail-Rodamco-Westfield SE
- Num. of stores: 200
- Num. of anchor tenants: 4
- Floor area: 1,223,475 sq ft (113,664.5 m^{2})
- Floors: 3
- Public transit: Fairfax Connector: 798; Metrobus: M70; Ride On: 6, 26, 42, 47, 96
- Website: https://www.westfield.com/en/united-states/montgomery

Westfield Montgomery (formerly Montgomery Mall), is an upscale shopping mall in Bethesda, Maryland. The mall is anchored by Macy's, Macy's Home, and Nordstrom. It has a 16-screen cinema operated by AMC Theatres.

== History ==
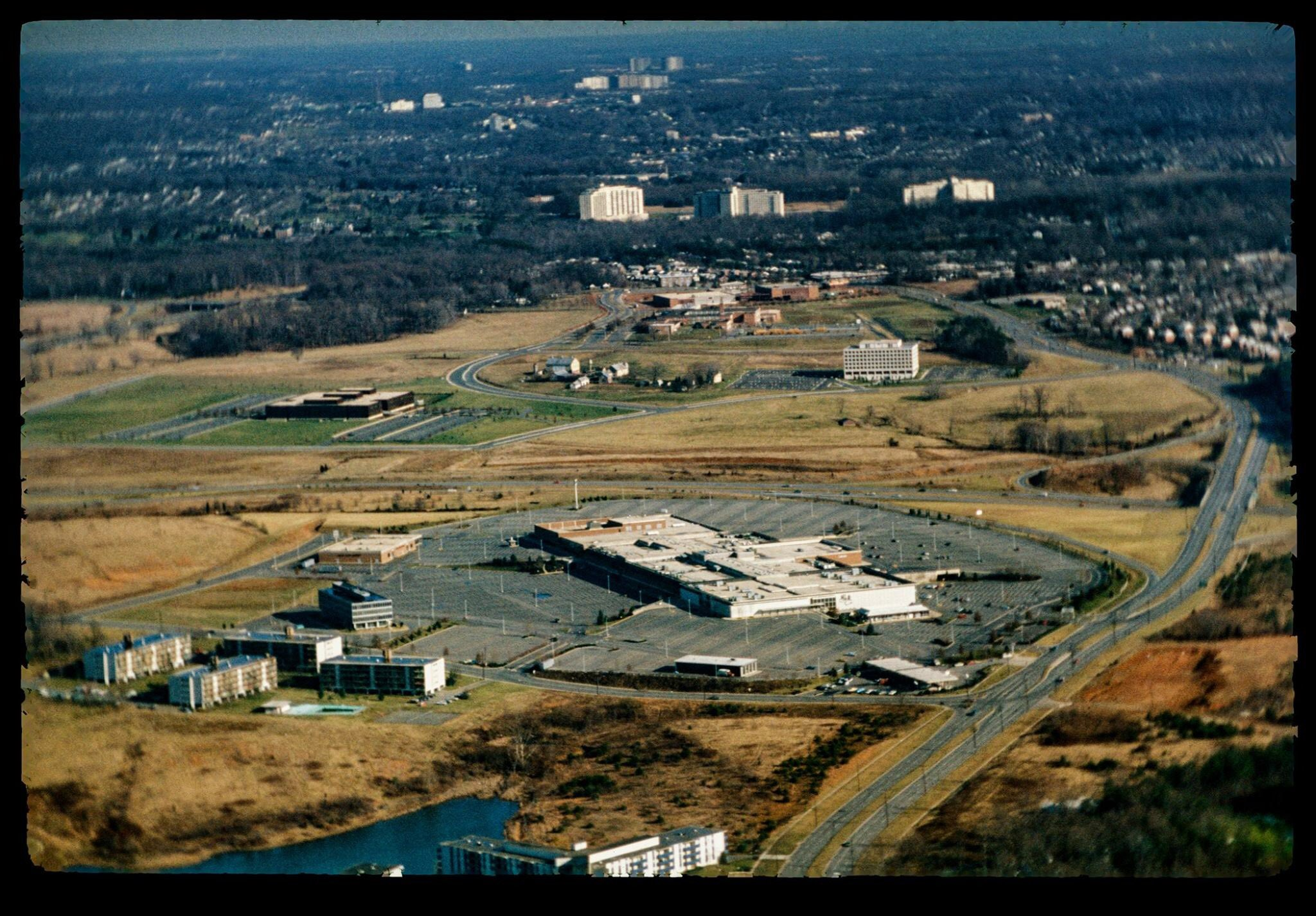
Montgomery Mall in 1973

The mall was built in the late 1960s as a joint venture between The May Department Stores Company and Strouse, Greenberg & Co. The building was based on a design by John Graham, Jr. and Ward and Hall.

It opened in March 1968 with three anchor stores—Hecht's, Garfinckel's, and Sears—and 58 smaller shops, including a Bond Stores outlet. The original mall logo was an owl-shaped "M".

A mid-1970s expansion added a US$4.5 million, 155,000-square-foot (14,400 m^{2}) Woodward & Lothrop store and 60,000 square feet (5,600 m^{2}) of retail space for 40 stores.

On March 1, 1976, longtime fugitive William Bradford Bishop bought a ball peen hammer and a gas can at the mall to allegedly kill and burn his family.

A renovation completed in October 1991 replaced the floors, added brass railings and a glass elevator (the latter removed in 2013), and removed the fountains to allow more kiosks and seating space. Crate & Barrel moved into an expansion wing, as did Nordstrom, becoming the chain's first store in Maryland and the third in the Washington, D.C. metropolitan area. The grand re-opening included a concert by Tony Bennett.

The Boulevard Cafes food court is located on the second level.

After the 2005 acquisition of May Department Stores by Federated Department Stores, the Hecht’s at Montgomery was renamed Macy’s in 2006.

On May 1, 2016, a new transit center at the mall replaced the old one.

=== Expansion ===
A plan to expand the mall by 360,000 square feet (33,000 m^{2}) was approved by Montgomery County in September 2007. With the expansion, Westfield Montgomery has more than 1,500,000 square feet (140,000 m^{2}), the fourth-largest mall in the Washington area behind Tysons Corner Center, Westfield Wheaton, and Fair Oaks Mall.

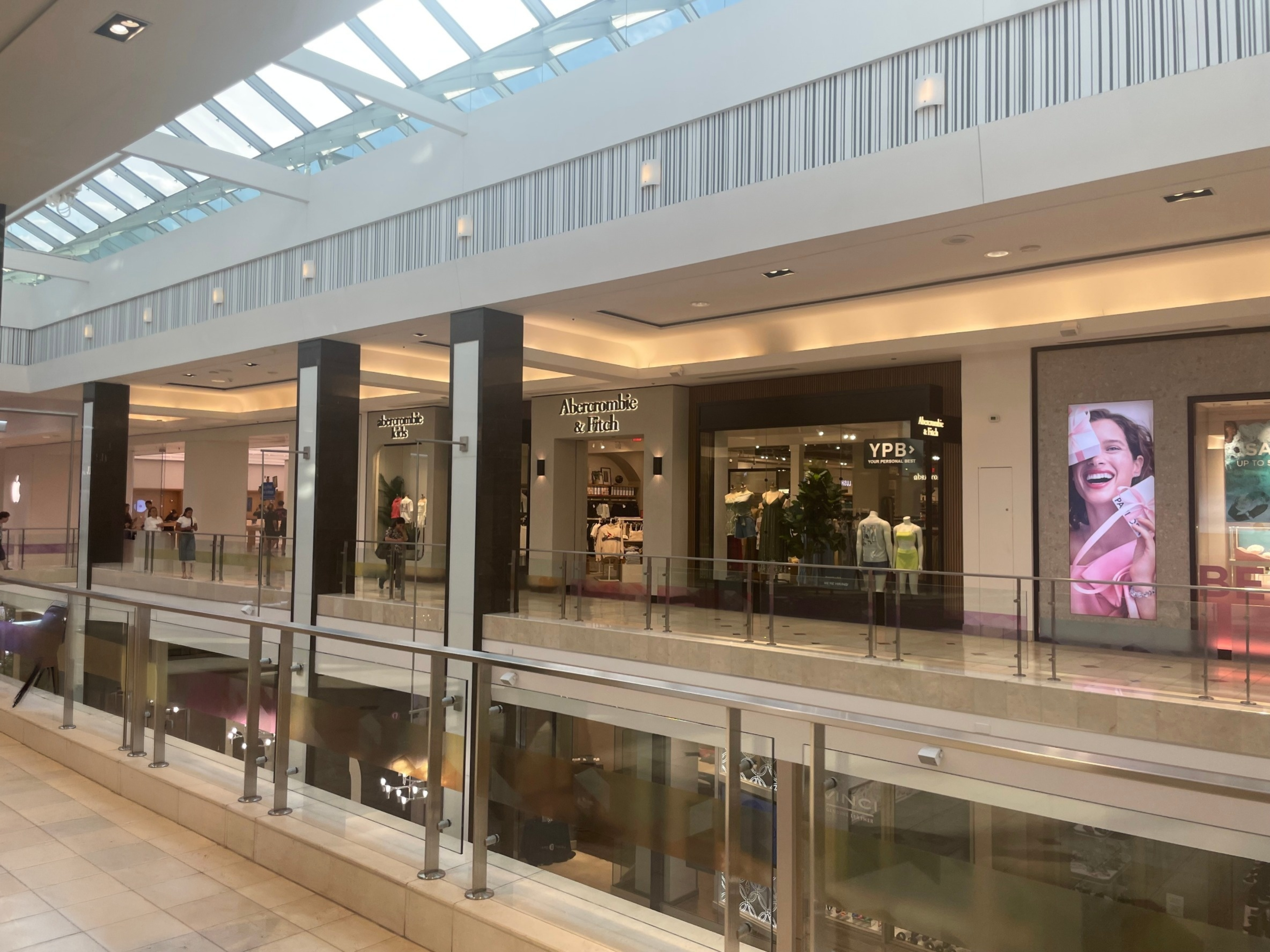
Inside of the mall

In 2014, a 16-screen Arclight Cinemas opened at the mall. It closed in April 2021 due to the COVID-19 pandemic; in February 2022, AMC Theatres acquired the lease to the cinema and announced that it would reopen the following month.

In June 2018, Westfield announced that Sears would close and the space used for smaller stores and an open-air mixed-use center. Demolition is to start on the former Sears building in 2026.

Recently, throughout 2025-2026, leasing momentum at the shopping centre has reached an all-time high, with numerous brands signing leases for spaces throughout the mall.

=== 2016 shooting ===
On May 6, 2016, former federal police officer Eulalio Tordil shot three people in the parking lot. One victim died.
