= The Shops at Wisconsin Place =

Shopping center in Chevy Chase, Maryland

Coordinates: 38°57′45″N 77°5′7″W

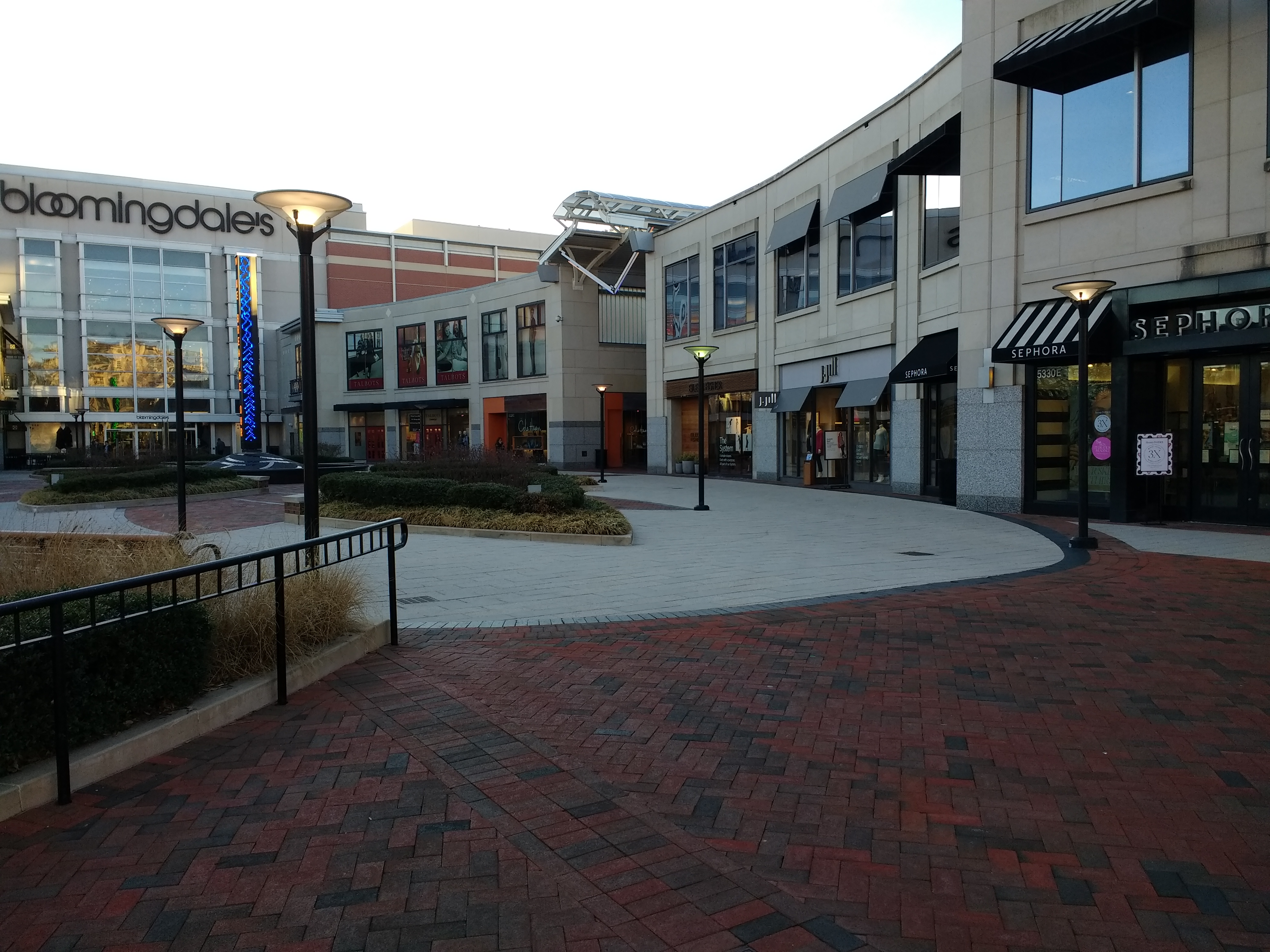

The Shops at Wisconsin Place is an open-air shopping center in Chevy Chase, Maryland. It is part of the mixed-use Wisconsin Place complex.

== History ==
The Shops at Wisconsin Place is located on the site of a former Woodward & Lothrop department store, which was converted to Hecht's in 1995 and closed in 2005.

== Tenants ==
The Shops are anchored by Maryland's second Bloomingdale's, which opened on September 27, 2007, and Whole Foods Market, which opened on May 18, 2010. P.F. Chang's, Talbots, Cole Haan, Anthropologie, Eileen Fisher, BCBG, MAC, The Capital Grille, Sephora, J. Jill, Ilori, Adolfo Dominguez, Le Pain Quotidien, and Giggle are now open. There is a three-story underground parking garage located beneath the shopping center. A 20,000-square-foot (1,900 m^{2}) county-run recreation and community center opened in Wisconsin Place in late September 2009. In addition to the Shops, parking, and the recreation center, Wisconsin Place includes a high-rise luxury apartment building and office space partially occupied by Microsoft.
