= Friendship Heights station =

Washington Metro station

Friendship Heights
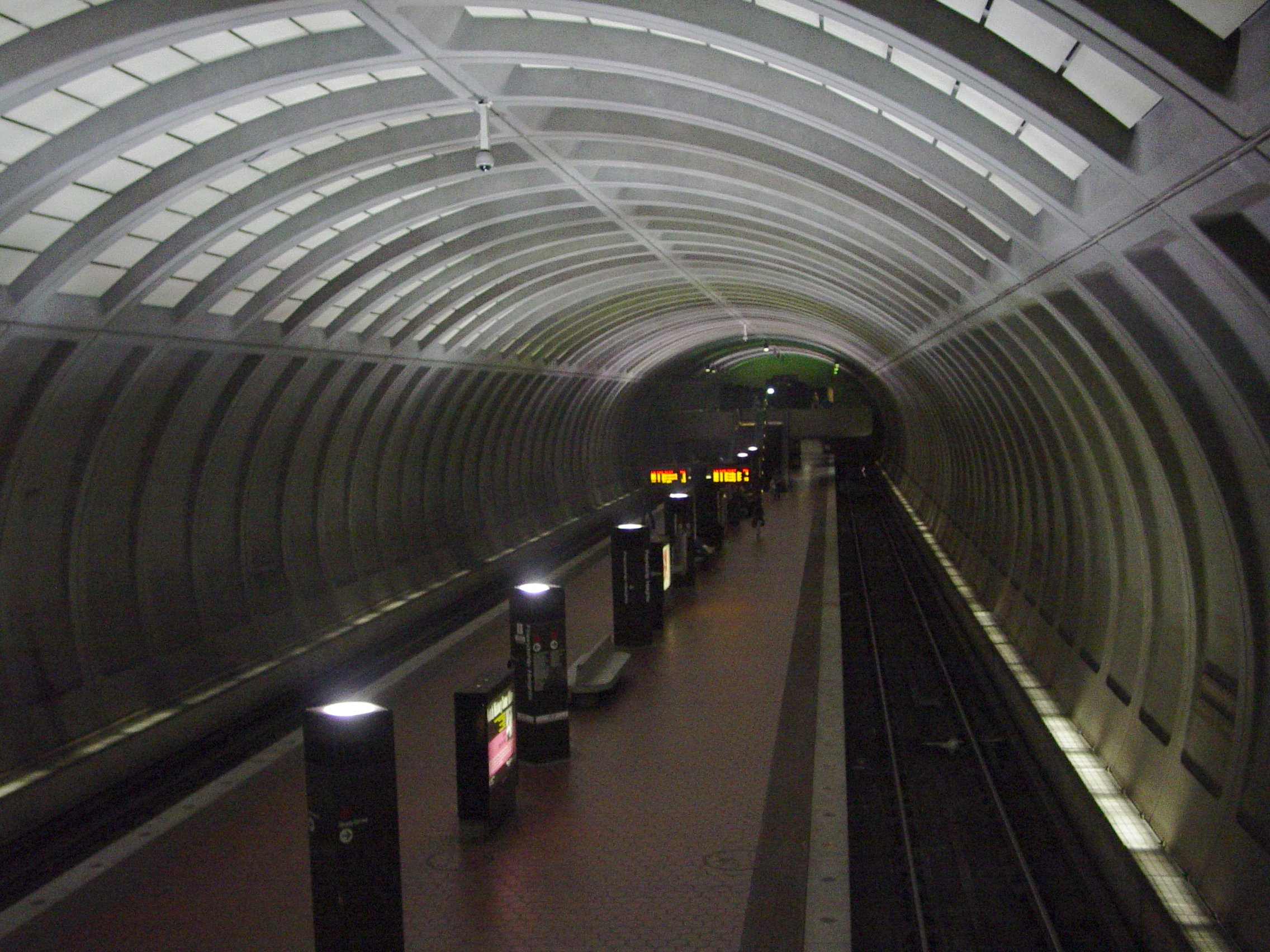
- Friendship Heights station platform from mezzanine in November 2005

General information
- Location: 5337 Wisconsin Avenue NW; Washington, D.C.
- Coordinates: 38.960921°N 77.086059°W
- Owner: Washington Metropolitan Area Transit Authority
- Platforms: 1 island platform
- Tracks: 2
- Connections: Metrobus: C83, D80, D82, D96, M82; Ride On: 1, 11, 23, 29; Friendship Heights Village Bus

Construction
- Structure type: Underground
- Cycle facilities: Capital Bikeshare, 50 racks and 22 lockers
- Accessible: Yes

Other information
- Station code: A08

History
- Opened: August 25, 1984; 42 years ago

Passengers
- 2025: 4,725 (average weekday)
- Rank: 35 of 98

Services
Preceding station	Washington Metro	Following station
Bethesda toward Shady Grove	Red Line	Tenleytown–AU toward Glenmont
Route map
Location

Friendship Heights station is a Washington Metro station on the Red Line straddling the border of Washington, D.C., and Montgomery County, Maryland, United States. The station was opened on August 25, 1984, and is operated by the Washington Metropolitan Area Transit Authority (WMATA).

== Location ==
The station is at the 5400 block of Wisconsin Avenue, Northwest and serves the neighborhoods of Chevy Chase and Friendship Heights. The area is a major retail shopping and broadcast media district. The station also serves as a bus depot linking Montgomery County Transit's Ride-On bus system with the Washington Metro. It is directly adjacent to the Western Division Metrobus garage on 44th Street and Harrison Street NW.

=== Notable places nearby ===
- Lisner-Louise-Dickson-Hurt Home
- The Shops at Wisconsin Place, Chevy Chase Pavilion, and other shopping centers
- WSBN, WMAL-FM, WLVW, WTOP-FM, and WFED radio stations

== History ==
The station opened on August 25, 1984. Its opening coincided with the completion of 6.8 miles (10.9 km) of rail northwest of the Van Ness–UDC station and the opening of the Bethesda, Grosvenor, Medical Center, and Tenleytown stations.

== Station layout ==
The Friendship Heights station uses the four-coffer arch design found at most underground stations on the western side of the Red Line, but it is the only Metro station with this design that has mezzanines at both ends of the platform. The station's walls are more rounded than counterparts such as Van Ness-UDC and Tenleytown-AU.

It is one of 11 Metro stations constructed with rock tunneling and is accordingly deeper than most other stations. Its platform is more than 100 feet (30 m) below its north entrance. The escalator has a length of 130 feet (40 m) and rises 65 feet (20 m) feet above the mezzanine level. The escalator ride from the common room at the north entrance to the mezzanine level takes roughly a minute and a half.

The station has entrances to both its northern and southern ends. The southern end is served by a bank of four high-speed elevators that connect the south mezzanine to a street-level exit at Wisconsin Avenue and Jenifer Street NW, which was built in 1985. At the northern end, five street entrances come together in an upper mezzanine, leading to a set of three escalators to the platform. Three of these entrances are on the Maryland side of Western Avenue, including an elevator, and two are on the District side. The station's main entrance surfaces in a bus depot underneath the Chevy Chase Metro Building. Another comes from a side entrance to the lobby of an entrance to the former C-level of Mazza Gallerie. Another goes to Chevy Chase Pavilion. The northern elevator is at street level. The newest entrance, located off Wisconsin Avenue next to The Shops at Wisconsin Place, opened between 2011 and 2022, replacing an earlier entrance that led into a Hecht's.
