= Bethesda station =

Washington Metro station

Bethesda
- The station platform and partially complete Purple Line mezzanine in September 2026

General information
- Location: 7450 Wisconsin Avenue; Bethesda, Maryland
- Coordinates: 38°59′05″N 77°05′41″W
- Owner: Washington Metropolitan Area Transit Authority (Metro station); Maryland Transit Administration (Purple Line station)
- Platforms: 1 island platform (Metro); 1 island platform (Purple Line – future)
- Tracks: 2 (Metro); 2 (Purple Line – future)
- Connections: Metrobus: D96, M22, M70; Ride On: 29, 30, 32, 34, 36, 47, 70; Bethesda Circulator; Fairfax Connector: 798; Capital Crescent Trail

Construction
- Structure type: Underground
- Cycle facilities: Capital Bikeshare, 48 racks and 44 lockers
- Accessible: Yes

Other information
- Station code: A09

History
- Opened: August 25, 1984; 42 years ago

Passengers
- 2025: 5,954 (average weekday)
- Rank: 22 of 98

Services
Preceding station	Washington Metro	Following station
Medical Center toward Shady Grove	Red Line	Friendship Heights toward Glenmont
Future services
Preceding station	Maryland Transit Administration	Following station
Terminus	Purple Line	Connecticut Avenue toward New Carrollton
Route map
Location

Bethesda station is a rapid transit station on the Red Line of the Washington Metro system in Bethesda, Maryland. It is one of the busiest suburban Metro stations, serving on average 5,818 passengers each weekday in 2025. The Purple Line, a light rail system currently under construction, will terminate at Bethesda, providing rail service to other inner Maryland suburbs such as Silver Spring and College Park, each of which has additional north–south connections by Washington Metro, and New Carrollton, which has Amtrak and MARC connections to both Washington, D.C., and Baltimore.

== Station layout ==
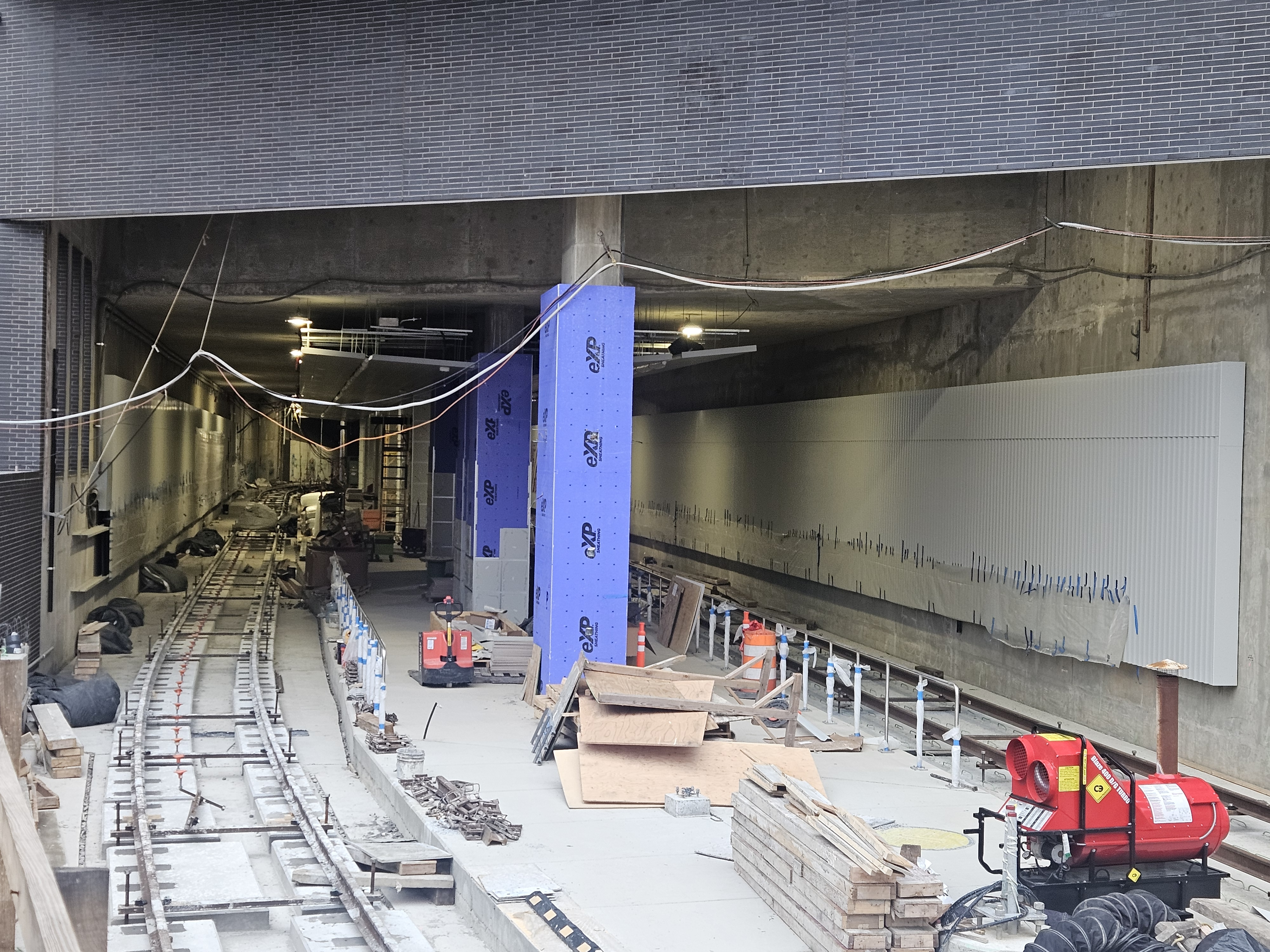
The under-construction Purple Line platform

Located at the center of the area's central business district, Bethesda station lies underneath Wisconsin Avenue at its intersection with Montgomery Avenue.

Like the other 10 stations in the system constructed with rock tunneling, Bethesda station is deep underground. Its platform is more than 120 feet (37 m) below the street level. Prior to the opening of the Wheaton station, the Bethesda station had the longest escalator in the Western Hemisphere, at 212 feet (65 m), with a rise of 106 feet (32 m).

The Bethesda station is compliant with the Americans with Disabilities Act of 1990. An elevator travels between street level in the northwest corner of Wisconsin Avenue and Montgomery Lane and the mezzanine, and another connects the mezzanine and the platform. The main escalators descending to the station are located on the west side of Wisconsin Avenue, adjacent to the station's underground bus bays. A Metro-style tunnel connects passengers to the southeast corner of Wisconsin Avenue and Old Georgetown Road. A mezzanine provides fare control and access to the station's island platform within the station.

== History ==
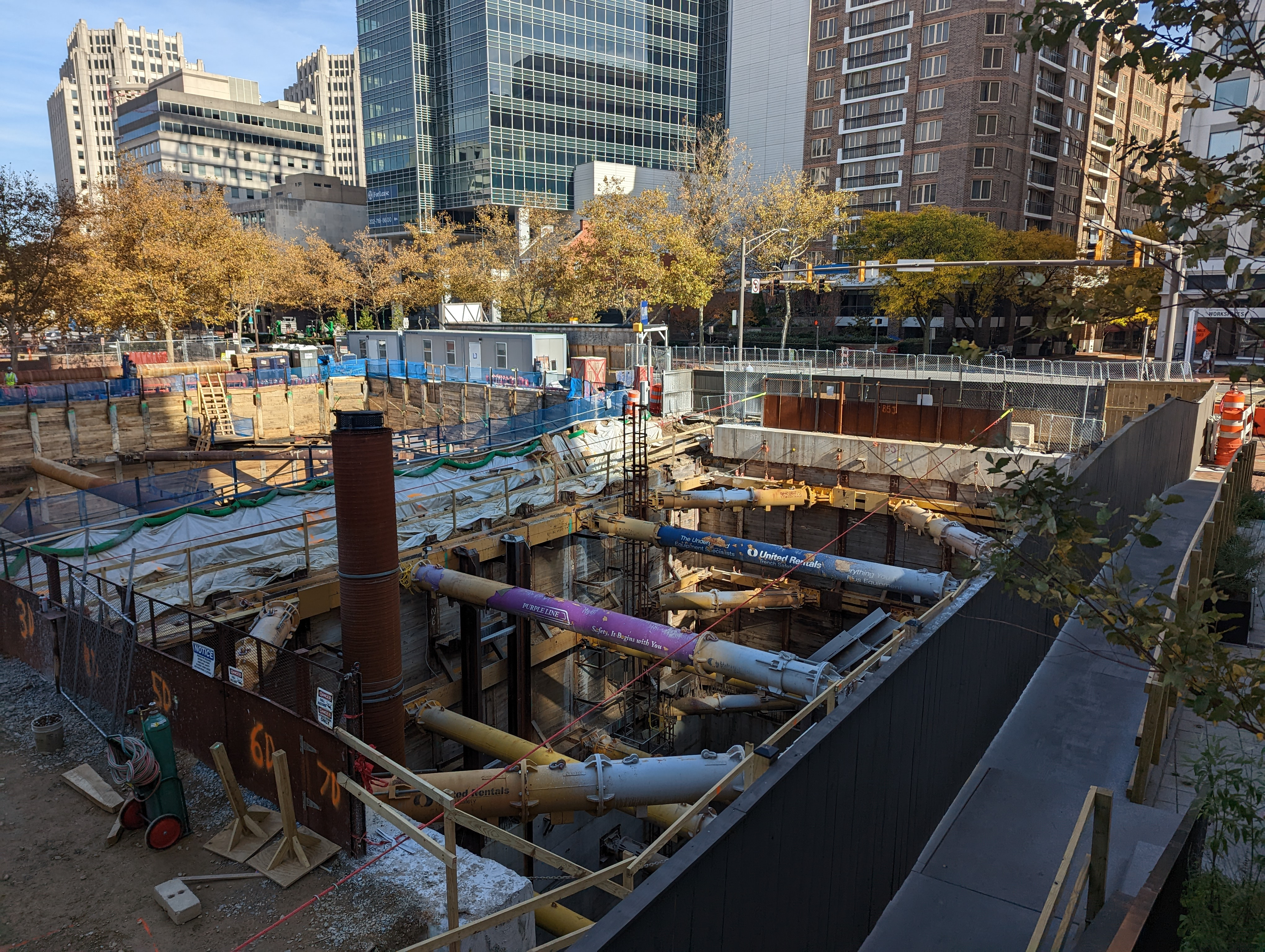
Construction of a deep elevator shaft for the new southern entrance

The station opened on August 25, 1984. Its opening coincided with the completion of 6.8 miles (10.9 km) of rail northwest of the Van Ness–UDC station and the opening of the Friendship Heights, Grosvenor–Strathmore, Medical Center and Tenleytown stations.

In October 2013, a new staircase appeared between the mezzanine and platform. In October 2014, the replacement of the first of three entrance escalators at the station began. The escalator site preparation, demolition, construction, installation and testing was projected to take approximately 42 weeks to complete. The $8.4 million project was completed on March 22, 2017. Between January 17 and December 24, 2022, the Bethesda Plaza entrance escalator was replaced with stairs that lead from the bus station to street level. The escalator was replaced because a canopy could not be accommodated that would provide protection from the elements for a new escalator.

The Purple Line system is under construction as of 2026 and is scheduled to open in late 2027. A new southern entrance will allow for connections to the Purple Line, which will be located in a tunnel running above the Red Line tunnel. The new entrance has a complex design, and the construction process has included extensive blasting operations. In 2024 it was reported that construction of the new mezzanine has led to large cost overruns. Installation of backup elevators is planned as part of the construction of the Purple Line. In October 2025 it was reported that excavation of the 150 feet (46 m) deep southern entrance was completed, involving the removal of 13,000 cubic yards (9,900 m^{3}) (weight approx. 2.5 million pounds (1.1×10^{6} kg). Construction of the elevators and stairways, and completion of the entrance is continuing in 2026. In May 2026 the Washington Metropolitan Area Transit Authority announced that the Bethesda, Medical Center and Grosvenor–Strathmore stations will be closed July 6 to September 6, 2026, to allow for creation of a new mezzanine in Bethesda, and completion of other Red Line construction projects. Work on the mezzanine will continue for another 18 months. The station re-opened on schedule on September 7th.
