= Ride On (Maryland) =

Public transit system in Montgomery County, Maryland

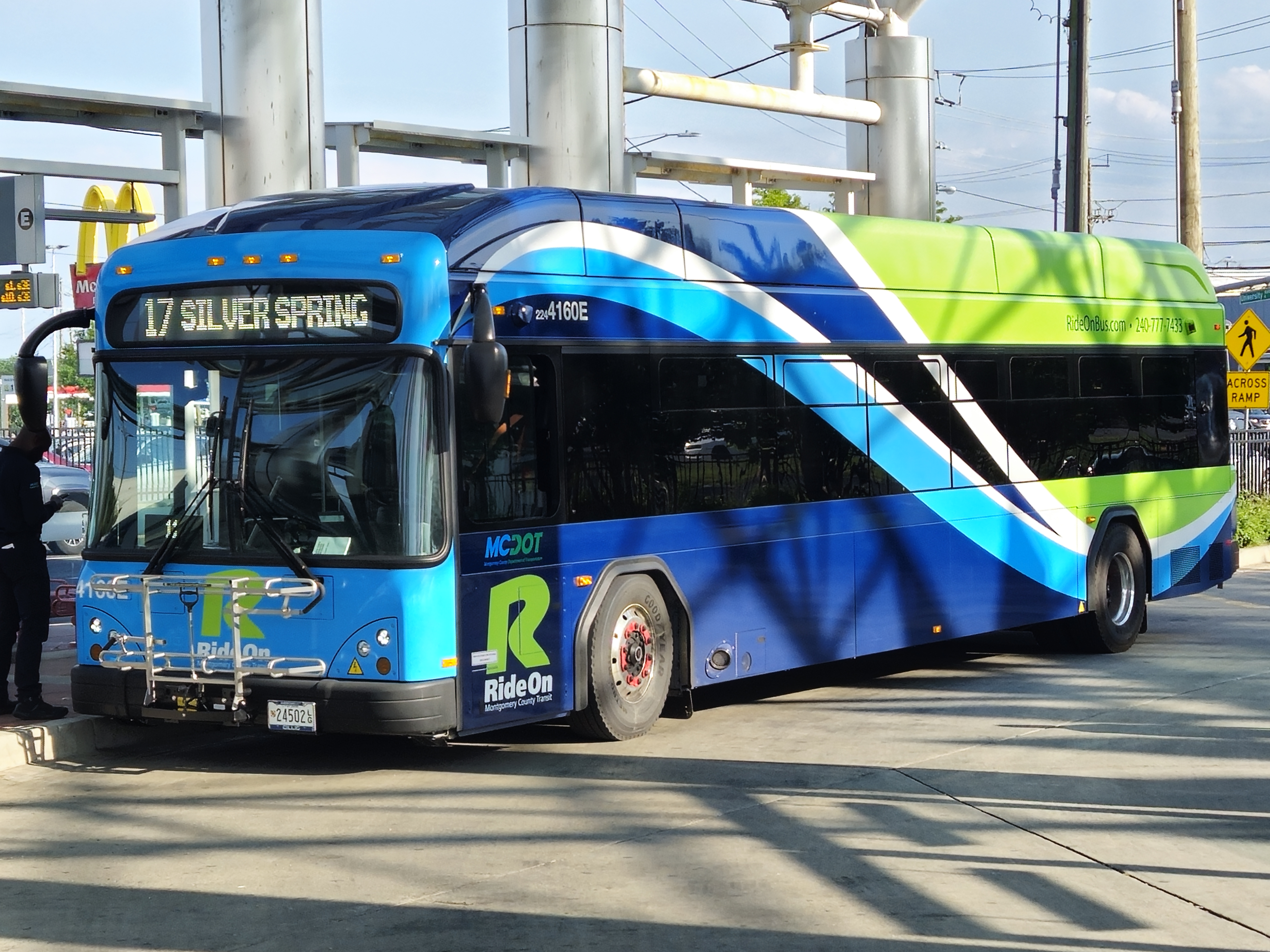
- Ride On bus at the Takoma Langley Crossroads Transit Center
- Formerly: Ride-On
- Parent: Montgomery County Department of Transportation (MCDOT)
- Founded: March 31, 1975
- Headquarters: 101 Monroe Street, 5th Floor; Rockville, Maryland, US
- Service area: Montgomery County, MD
- Service type: fixed-route bus service, paratransit, demand responsive transport, and bus rapid transit
- Routes: 82
- Depots: Nicholson, Gaithersburg, and Silver Spring
- Fleet: 400 (est.)
- Daily ridership: 64,000 (weekdays, Q2 2026)
- Annual ridership: 19,640,400 (2025)
- Fuel type: CNG, diesel, and battery electric
- Operator: Montgomery County Department of Transportation, Route 301 and FLEX operated by external contractors.
- Manager: Christopher Conklin
- Website: Official Site

Ride On, formerly Ride-On, is a local bus transportation system in Montgomery County, Maryland. Managed by the Montgomery County Department of Transportation, Ride On primarily serves Montgomery County, with short segments crossing into Prince George's County and Washington, D.C. It is a separate entity from WMATA, which also provides a bus service in Montgomery County, along with a rail service. Ride On operates 82 routes throughout Montgomery County.

In fiscal year 2018, it operated with a US$112.3 million budget. In 2025, the system had a ridership of 19,640,400, or about 64,000 per weekday as of the second quarter of 2026, making it one of the most heavily ridden suburban bus systems in the United States.

== History ==
Ride On's former logo, used in the 1970s and 1980s

Ride On's former logo, used from the mid-1990s to late 2008

=== 1970s–1990s ===
Ride On began service on March 31, 1975, as Ride-On, in response to WMATA asking Montgomery County to pay for the operation of Metro Bus routes within the county. Serving Silver Spring and Takoma Park, two routes were in operation with 20 buses: the Blue and the Green. Within a few weeks, Ride-On was carrying twice the number of passengers projected: about 2,000 riders per day. Ride-On was the first major local bus operator to emerge in the DC Region following the formation of Metro Bus in 1973.

In the fall of 1984, as the Washington Metro's Red Line extension to Shady Grove station was complete, Ride On saw its largest route expansion to date. Numerous routes were added to accommodate passengers who would utilize the eight new Metrorail stations along the western portion of Montgomery County.

=== 2000s ===
On September 11, 2001, Ride On buses were used to transport Montgomery County firefighters to The Pentagon in Arlington, Virginia, to assist in search and rescue operations following the terrorist attacks that occurred on that day.

In 2006, Ride On began accepting SmarTrip cards, and in August of that year, all the Ride On buses started to be equipped with compatible fareboxes.

=== 2010s ===
On May 20, 2011, a Ride On bus crashed into a KFC restaurant in Glenmont around 7:30 AM. Authorities believed the driver passed out while making a left turn onto Georgia Avenue and lost control of the bus due to having a heart attack. There were three passengers on the bus; the driver and one of the passengers were taken to the hospital for non-life-threatening injuries. The only occupant in the building of the crash was not injured. While the damage to the building was considered minor, an inspector deemed it unsafe, and the restaurant never reopened afterward.

In 2017, Ride On extRa route 101, a new peak hour limited stop service, was launched with service between Lakeforest Mall in Gaithersburg and Medical Center Metro in Bethesda. The route provided a more frequent alternative to existing routes in the corridor, with limited stops and running every 10–15 minutes.

In October 2018, Ride On received a $4.365 million grant from the Federal Transit Administration to replace diesel buses with 10 new battery-electric buses. The first buses were built in 2019 and entered service in 2020.

=== 2020s ===
In March 2020, Ride On significantly altered bus service in response to the COVID-19 pandemic. Many routes were suspended with other routes having significantly reduced service. Fare collection was also suspended until July 2022.

On October 14, 2020, Ride On's bus rapid transit service, FLASH, debuted along US 29 between Briggs Chaney and Silver Spring, with peak-hour service continuing to Burtonsville. Peak-hour service was extended to Columbia in Howard County in September 2026. A FLASH route on Veirs Mill Road between Wheaton and Rockville is currently under construction. FLASH was the second BRT system to be launched in the DC region, after WMATA's Metroway in Virginia.

In July 2023, Ride On launched its official mobile app, Ride On Trip Planner, created in partnership with Moovit. The app provides trip planning tools and real-time arrival information for Ride On buses.

On December 27, 2023, a Ride On bus crashed into a house in Silver Spring around 7:30 PM. The driver reportedly lost control of the bus while entering a roundabout, hit a parked car, and collided with the side of the house. There were no passengers on the bus, and the house was not occupied at the time. It was later discovered that the same vehicle had previously crashed into a KFC restaurant in May 2011.

In September 2024, the first phase of the Great Seneca Transit Network was launched, with two new Ride On extRa Routes being added to serve the Life Sciences region and the Universities at Shady Grove. The Pink and Lime routes run frequent service all day and on weekends.

On June 29, 2025, the agency launched the first phase of its "Ride On Reimagined" transit master plan. Most of the changes in this phase were made to complement WMATA's system-wide Better Bus Network Redesign, which took effect on the same day. It also eliminated all fares on all of its transit services beginning the same day, becoming the 4th operator in the DC region to go fare-free, after DASH, TheBus, and CUE Bus.

On February 2, 2026, Ride On launched its third Flex Zone route, serving areas near White Oak, Sandy Spring, and New Hampshire Avenue to cover areas previously served by the discontinued Metrobus route Z2.

On July 1, 2026, Ride On discontinued its original Flex zone route that served areas such as Rockville, Glenmont, and Wheaton, after a 7-year operation run that started on June 26, 2019, and ended on the day of July 1, 2026.

On September 8, 2026, Ride On extended its FLASH Bus Rapid Transit (BRT) Blue route into Howard County, operating along US 29 and serving Burtonsville, Silver Spring and Downtown Columbia. The route only operates during peak hours, starting and ending service at Silver Spring station and Downtown Columbia, with its midpoint on the route being Burtonsville Park and Ride, and it also serves Johns Hopkins University Applied Physics Laboratory (APL).

== Routes ==
Ride On offers 82 routes throughout Montgomery County. All the routes run through peak rush hour periods between 6 and 9 AM and between 3 and 7 PM on weekdays. Many routes offer services for off-peak hours and weekends as well. The following table contains the full list of local and supplemental routes currently in operation.

=== Local service routes ===
Route	Unofficial name	First terminal	Second terminal	Service	Notes
1	Connecticut/East-West	Friendship Heights	Silver Spring Transit Center	Daily	via Connecticut Avenue & East-West Highway
2	Lyttonsville	Ride-On Operations Center	Silver Spring Transit Center	Daily	
4	Linden/Kensington	Wheaton Metro	Silver Spring Transit Center	Weekday Peak	via Kensington
5	Strathmore/Kensington	Twinbrook Metro	Silver Spring Transit Center	Daily	via Kensington
6	Grosvenor	Montgomery Mall	Parkside Condos	Mon-Fri	via Grosvenor-Strathmore Metro station
7	Inwood	Wheaton Metro	Forest Glen Metro	Weekday Peak	Peak direction service (AM to Forest Glen & PM to Wheaton)
8	Forest Glen	Wheaton Metro	Silver Spring Transit Center	Daily	via Forest Glen Road & Metro Holy Cross Hospital (Eastbound only from Forest Glen Metro station)
9	Arcola/Colesville	Wheaton Metro	Silver Spring Transit Center	Daily	via Arcola Avenue
11	East-West Supplemental	Friendship Heights	Silver Spring Transit Center	Weekday Peak	Supplemental to route 1; Peak direction service (AM to Friendship Heights & PM to Silver Spring)
12	Flower	Takoma Metro	Silver Spring Transit Center	Daily	
13	Sligo Creek	Takoma Metro	Silver Spring Transit Center	Weekday Peak	
14	Franklin	Takoma Metro	Silver Spring Transit Center	Mon-Sat	Select Takoma bound weekday trips via Eastern MS.
15	Manchester	Takoma Langley TC	Silver Spring Transit Center	Daily	
16	New Hampshire/Langley Park	Takoma Metro	Silver Spring Transit Center	Daily	via Langley Park
17	Philadelphia	Takoma Langley TC	Silver Spring Transit Center	Daily	
18	Carroll/Fenton	Takoma Langley TC	Silver Spring Transit Center	Daily	via Montgomery College Takoma Park/Silver Spring; Silver Spring service operates select hours Mon-Sat only. All other trips including all Sunday service ends at Takoma Metro station.
19	Dennis/Northwood	Forest Glen Rd/Burnett	Silver Spring Transit Center	Weekday Peak	via Northwood neighborhood; Peak direction service (AM to Silver Spring & PM to Dallas Avenue/Northwood); Select PM trips via Parkway Plaza.
20	Piney Branch/New Hampshire	Hillandale Center	Silver Spring Transit Center	Daily	Select weekday trips extend to Cresthaven.
21	White Oak/Fairland	Briggs Chaney P&R	Silver Spring Transit Center	Weekday Peak	via US-29; Peak direction service (AM to Silver Spring & PM to Briggs Chaney)
22	Cresthaven	Hillandale Center	Silver Spring Transit Center	Weekday Peak	Serves the White Oak FDA campus
23	MacArthur	Sibley Memorial Hospital	Friendship Heights	Mon-Sat	via MacArthur Blvd: Brookmont served toward Friendship Heights only.
24	Piney Branch Supplemental	Hillandale Center	Takoma Metro	Weekday Peak	Peak direction service (AM to Takoma & PM to Hillandale Center)
25	Maple	Takoma Langley TC	Takoma Metro	Weekday Peak	
26	Aspen Hill/Old Georgetown	Montgomery Mall	Glenmont Metro	Daily	via Aspen Hill Road, Twinbrook & North Bethesda Metro stations, and Old Georgetown Road
27	Powder Mill	Hillandale Center	Tech Rd / US-29	Daily	via White Oak Adventist Hospital; Enters Prince George's County as part of the route.
28	Silver Spring Circulator	Silver Spring Transit Center		Mon-Sat	Silver Spring circulator
29	Glen Echo	Bethesda Metro	Friendship Heights	Daily	via Glen Echo
30	Pooks Hill	Medical Center	Bethesda Metro	Mon-Fri	Select trips serve Whitley Park terrace.
31	Kemp Mill	Glenmont Metro	Wheaton Metro	Weekday Peak	via Kemp Mill
32	Cabin John	Bethesda Metro	Naval Ship R&D Center	Weekday Peak	via MacArthur Blvd
33	Jones Mill/Kensington	Glenmont Metro	Medical Center	Weekday Peak	via Kensington
34	Connecticut/Kensington	Bethesda Metro	Wheaton Metro	Daily	via Kensington
36	Bethesda Loop	Bethesda Metro		Mon-Fri	via Bradley Bouelvard: Peak Hour trips via Hillandale Road (AM inbound & PM outbound)
37	Tuckerman/Potomac	Potomac Community Center	Wheaton Metro	Weekday Peak	via Kensington, Grosvenor-Strathmore Metro station, and Tuckerman Lane
38	Garrett Park	North Bethesda	Wheaton Metro	Daily	Select trips serve Westfield’s Wheaton Mall.; Select weekday trips serve Holiday Park Senior Center.
39	Good Hope	Briggs Chaney P&R	Glenmont Metro	Weekday Peak	via Good Hope Road
40	Veirs Mill	Montgomery College (Rockville Campus) (MC Business Hours Mon-Sat) Rockville station (Early AM, Late PM, Sunday)	Wheaton Metro	Daily	Operates to Montgomery College Rockville during business hours Mon-Sat. Early AM, Late PM and all Sunday services ends at Rockville Metro station.
41	Connecticut/Aspen Hill	Grande Pre / Bel Pre	Wheaton Metro	Daily	via Weller Road, Glenmont Metro station, and Connecticut Avenue.
42	Montrose/Bells Mill	Montgomery Mall TC	North Bethesda	Mon-Sat	
43	Shady Grove	Traville / USG	Shady Grove	Daily	via Shady Grove Road: Weekday service via Gaither Road.
44	Edmonston	Twinbrook Metro	Rockville Station	Weekday Peak	
45	Baltimore/Fallsgrove	Fallsgrove Center	Rockville Station	Mon-Sat	Select weekday trips serve Rockville Senior Center.
46	Rockville Pike	MC Rockville	Medical Center	Daily	
47	Seven Locks/Old Georgetown	Bethesda Metro	Rockville Station	Daily	via Montgomery Mall and Park Potomac
48	Bauer/Rock Creek	Rockville Station	Wheaton Metro	Daily	via Rock Creek Village
49	Bel Pre	Rockville Station	Glenmont Metro	Daily	via Bel Pre Road
51	Layhill/Norbeck	Georgia Ave/ICC P&R	Glenmont Metro	Weekday Peak	
52	Norbeck/Olney	Rockville Station	Medstar Montgomery	Weekday Peak	via Norbeck Road
53	Bowie Mill/Olney	Shady Grove	Glenmont Metro	Weekday Peak	via ICC/MD-200 and Olney
54	Muddy Branch/Rio Lakefront	Rockville Station	Lakeforest Transit Center	Daily	via RIO Lakefront: Select trips via Muddy Branch Center, Mon-Sat Only.; Limited peak hour service to NIST.
55	Frederick	Rockville Station	Germantown Transit Center	Daily	via Frederick Avenue (MD-355): Does not serve Montgomery College Germantown on Sundays.
56	Darnestown/Quince Orchard	Rockville Station	Lakeforest Transit Center	Daily	via Quince Orchard & Darnestown Roads: All weekday trips via Edison Park.
57	Muncaster Mill/Gaithersburg	Shady Grove	Lakeforest Transit Center	Daily	via Old Town Gaithersburg
58	Snouffer School	Shady Grove	Lakeforest Transit Center	Daily	via Snouffer School Road: Peak hour trips via Turkey Thicket Drive.
59	Deer Park/Crabbs Branch	Rockville Station	Montgomery Village/Club House	Daily	via Crabbs Branch Way and Lakeforest Transit Center.: Peak hour trips towards Montgomery Village bypass Walker's Choice.
60	Centerway	Shady Grove	Montgomery Village/Club House	Weekday Peak	via Centerway Road; Peak direction service (AM to Shady Grove & PM to Montgomery Village)
61	Watkins Mill	Shady Grove	Germantown Transit Center	Daily	via Watkins Mill Road
63	Piccard	Rockville Station	Shady Grove	Mon-Fri	via Piccard Drive
64	Emory Grove	Shady Grove	Montgomery Village/Club House	Daily	via Emory Grove Road
65	Midcounty Highway Limited	Shady Grove	Montgomery Village/Club House	Weekday Peak	via Mid-County Highway; Limited stop service; Peak direction service (AM to Shady Grove & PM to Montgomery Village)
66	King Farm/Medical Center	Shady Grove	Traville / USG	Weekday Peak	via King Farm neighborhood; Peak direction service (AM to Traville & PM to Shady Grove)
67	Dufief Mill	Shady Grove	Traville / USG	Weekday Peak	via Dufief Mill Road; Peak direction service (AM to Shady Grove & PM to Traville)
70	Germantown/Bethesda Express	Bethesda Metro	Milestone P&R	Weekday Peak	Express via I-270; Peak direction service to Medical Center (AM to Bethesda & PM to Milestone)
71	Dawson Farm	Shady Grove	Kingsview P&R	Weekday Peak	via Dawson Farm Road; Peak direction service (AM to Shady Grove & PM to Kingsview)
73	Cabin Branch/Clarksburg	Shady Grove	Cabin Branch	Weekday Peak	via Clarksburg
74	Great Seneca Highway	Shady Grove	Germantown Transit Center	Mon-Sat	via Great Seneca Highway
75	Seneca Meadows/Clarksburg	Germantown Transit Center	Clarksburg Correctional Facility	Daily	Weekday peak hour trips extend to Germantown MARC Station.; Select weekday trips serve Clarksburg HS.
76	Darnestown/Poolesville	Shady Grove	Poolesville/Quince Orchard HS	Mon-Sat	via Darnestown and Kentlands: Serves Poolesville only during Weekday Peak Hours. All off-peak and Saturday trips end at Quince Orchard High School.
78	Richter Farm	Shady Grove	Kingsview P&R	Mon-Sat	via Richter Farm Road: Peak hour trips via Metropolitan Grove MARC/MVA (AM to Shady Grove & PM to Kingsview)
79	Clarksburg	Shady Grove	Gateway Center	Weekday Peak	via Clarksburg; Peak direction service (AM to Shady Grove & PM to Clarksburg)
81	Tower Oaks	Rockville Station	North Bethesda station	Weekday Peak	via Tower Oaks Blvd
83	Seneca Meadows/Germantown	Germantown Transit Center	Holy Cross Germantown Hospital	Mon-Sat	via Milestone Center: Weekday peak hour trips extend to Germantown MARC Station.
90	Damascus	Shady Grove	Damascus/Milestone Center	Mon-Fri	via Damascus; Midday service extends to Milestone Center
96	Rock Spring	Montgomery Mall TC	Grosvenor	Weekday Peak	Montgomery Mall served during midday only.
97	Germantown Loop	Germantown Transit Center		Daily	via Crystal Rock Drive: AM clockwise & PM counter-clockwise; Weekday peak hour trips serve Germantown MARC Station
98	Germantown/Kingsview	Germantown Transit Center	Kingsview P&R	Mon-Sat	via Richter Farm Road: Select weekday trips via Germantown Community Center.; Extends to Cinnamon Hill during peak hours.; Saturday trips via Maryland Soccerplex.
100	Shady Grove/Germantown Express	Shady Grove	Germantown Transit Center	Daily	Non-stop via I-270
301	Travillah/Tobytown	Rockville Station	Tobytown Drive	Daily	via Glenstone Museum (except first/last two trips in both directions); Operated by external contractor.

=== Route Changes effective January 2027 ===
Route	Changes
74	Introduce Sunday Service
76	All Weekday Off-Peak and Saturday trips go to Poolesville via Quince Orchard HS
90	Introduce Saturday Service from Shady Grove Metro to Milestone P+R

=== Flash BRT & Ride On extRa networks ===
These high-frequency corridors utilize dedicated lanes and transit signal priority to bypass congestion.

Route	First terminal	Second terminal	Service	Notes
FLASH Blue	Silver Spring Transit Center	Downtown Columbia	Weekday Peak	bypasses White Oak: Serves Burtonsville Park and Ride and Johns Hopkins University Applied Physics Laboratory (APL)
FLASH Orange	Silver Spring Transit Center	Briggs Chaney Park and Ride	Daily	via White Oak: Peak Hour trips via FDA (AM to Briggs Chaney, PM to Silver Spring)
ExtRa 101	Medical Center Metro	Lakeforest Transit Center	Weekday Peak	Operates to 13 stops every 10 minutes.
ExtRa Pink	Shady Grove Metro	Traville Gateway TC/USG	Daily	High-frequency medical and life sciences corridor.
ExtRa Lime	Shady Grove Metro	Traville Gateway TC/USG	Daily	Serves RIO / Washingtonian Center and Crown.

== Regional transit hubs ==
Montgomery County's bus network is anchored by several "Super Hubs" that serve as multi-modal gateways. The ongoing construction of the Purple Line, a 16-mile light rail line scheduled to open in late 2027, is the primary driver of infrastructure updates at these locations. Ride On serves 13 Metrorail stations and numerous transit centers that facilitate these regional connections.

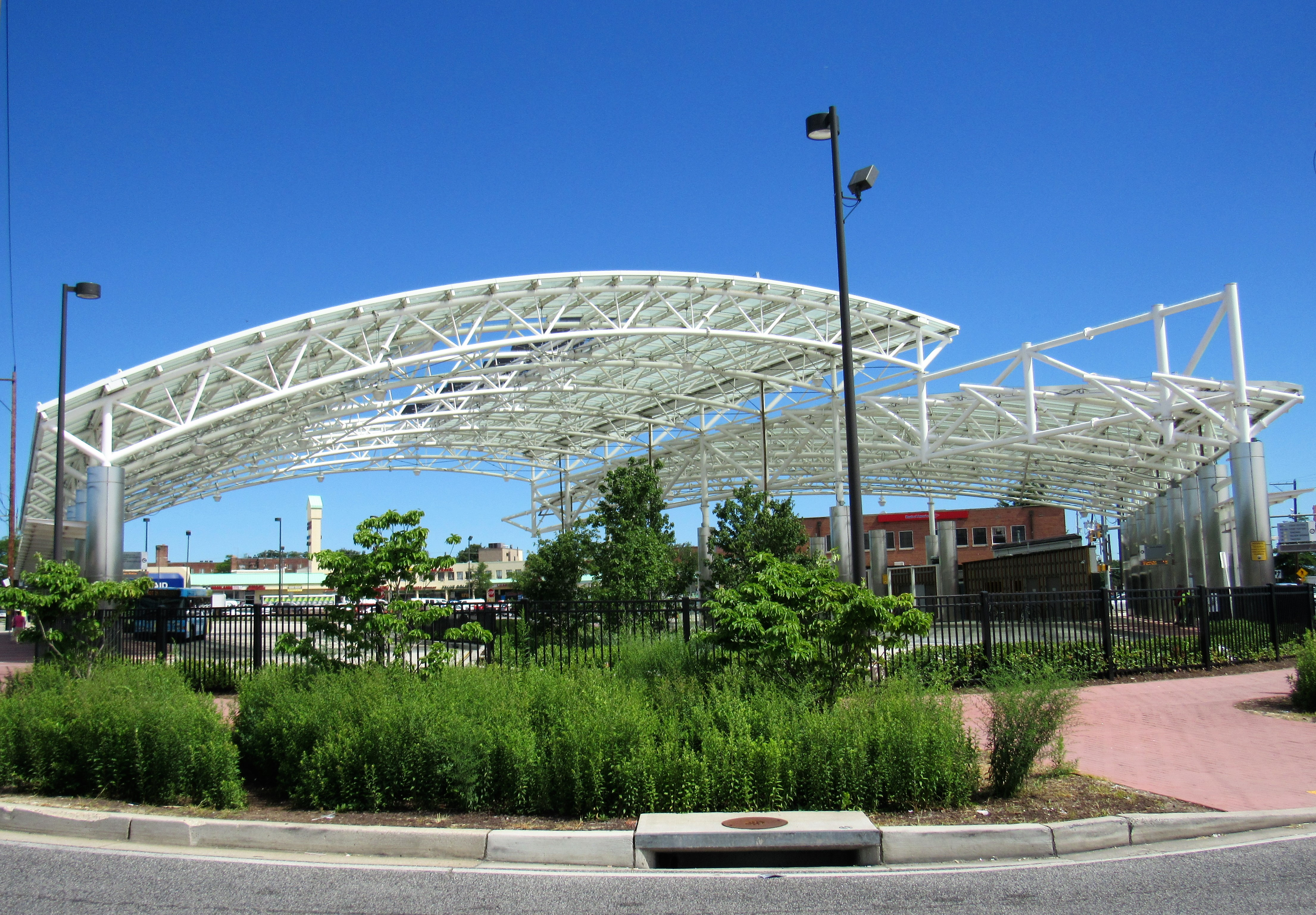
Takoma Langley Crossroads Transit Center

Paul S. Sarbanes Transit Center (Silver Spring): The county's largest hub, connecting Ride On, Metrobus, MARC, and the Metrorail Red Line. In early 2026, the station saw temporary closures to finalize the Purple Line platform on the third level (north side), which will allow seamless transfers between bus levels and light rail.

Takoma Langley Crossroads Transit Center: Located at the intersection of University Blvd and New Hampshire Ave, this $35 million facility serves as the primary "East County" anchor. It is currently being integrated with a major Purple Line stop to link Langley Park residents to both Bethesda and New Carrollton.

Bethesda Transit Center: A massive engineering project is nearing completion to connect the deep-level Red Line station to the new Purple Line terminus. As of February 2026, construction on the South Entrance is advancing to link the two systems, and the Capital Crescent Trail tunnel is slated to reopen by late 2026 or early 2027.

Shady Grove & Rockville: These remain the primary hubs for the MD-355 corridor. While not directly on the Purple Line, they are being upgraded with enhanced Flash BRT docking stations to feed passengers into the county's growing high-capacity transit spine.

== Additional services ==
Along with standard fixed-route operations, Ride On operates three additional services, Ride On extRa, Ride On Flex, and Flash BRT.

=== Ride On extRa ===
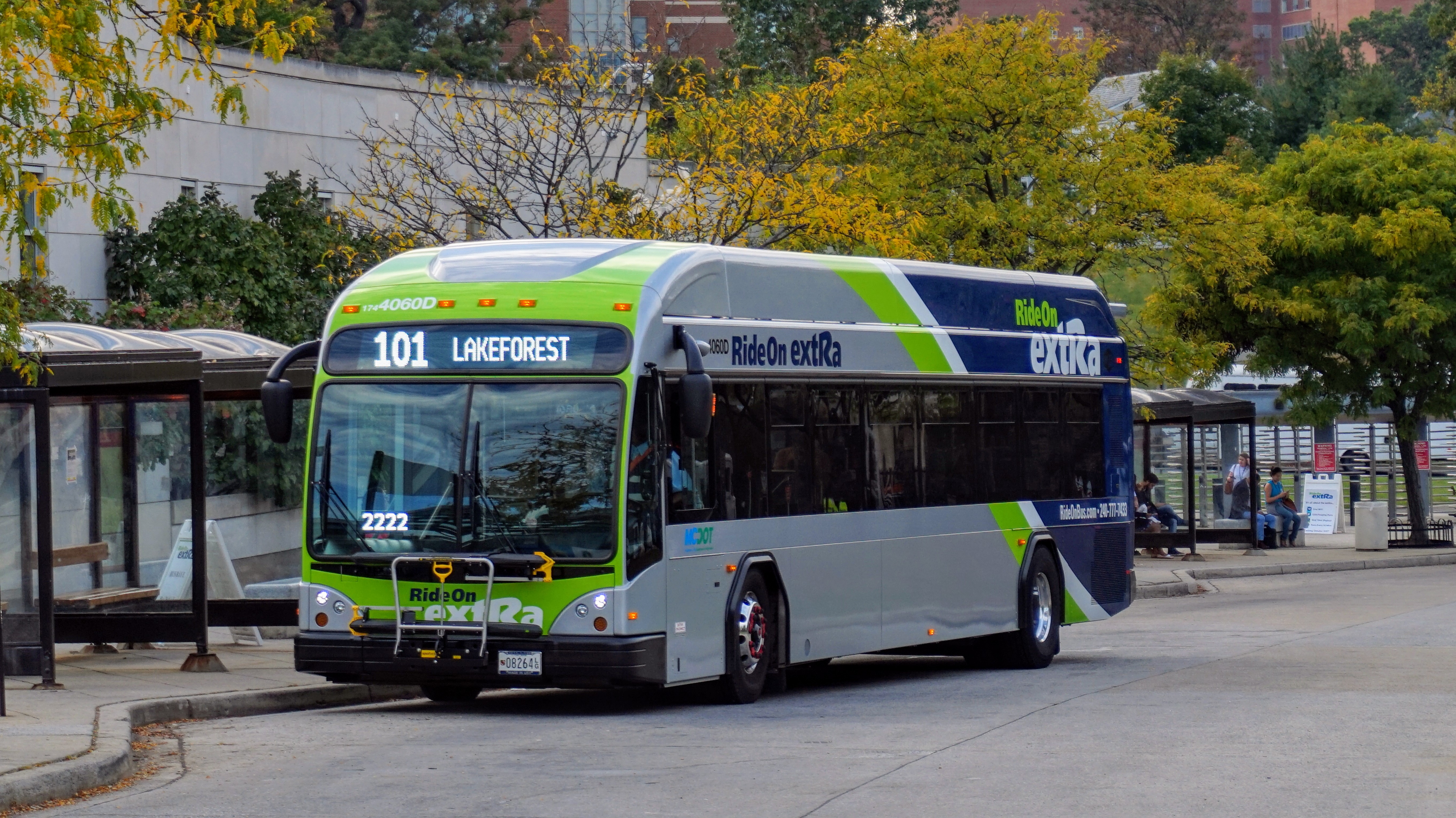
Ride On extRa bus

Ride On extRa is a limited stop bus service to complement major local bus routes by following similar routing but making fewer stops to help speed up travel time.

Route 101 began service on October 2, 2017, complementing routes 46 and 55 along Maryland Route 355, serving 13 stops from Medical Center Metro station in Bethesda to Lakeforest Transit Center in Gaithersburg. The route operates every 10–20 minutes in both directions with service during weekday peak hours only.

The Great Seneca BRT Network began service on September 8, 2024 with the first phase consisting of two routes, Pink and Lime and with another two routes planned for the second phase. The Pink and Lime routes both start at the Shady Grove Metro station and end outside The Universities at Shady Grove campus, but follow different routing to provide service to the Great Seneca Life Sciences Complex and various neighborhoods and business districts in Gaithersburg. Both routes operate daily with varying service levels.

=== Ride On Flex ===
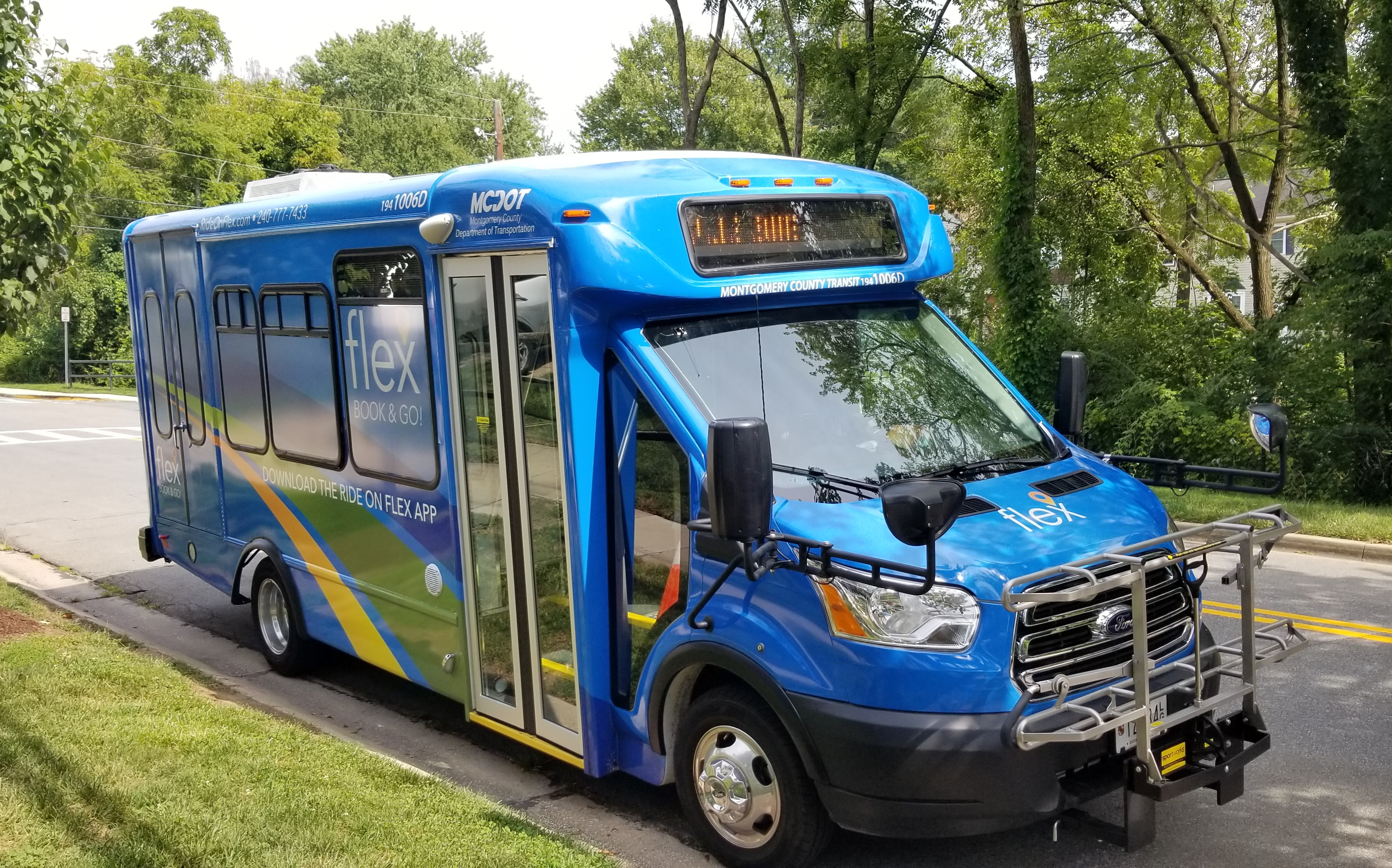
Ride On Flex van

Ride On Flex is an on-demand bus service that began serving Montgomery County on June 26, 2019, and was effectively discontinued on July 1, 2026, that ran in and around Rockville, Glenmont, and Wheaton. It now only serves White Oak and Sandy Spring with its release in February, using 11-passenger cutaway buses. Passengers are able to request a bus using an app.

=== Flash BRT ===
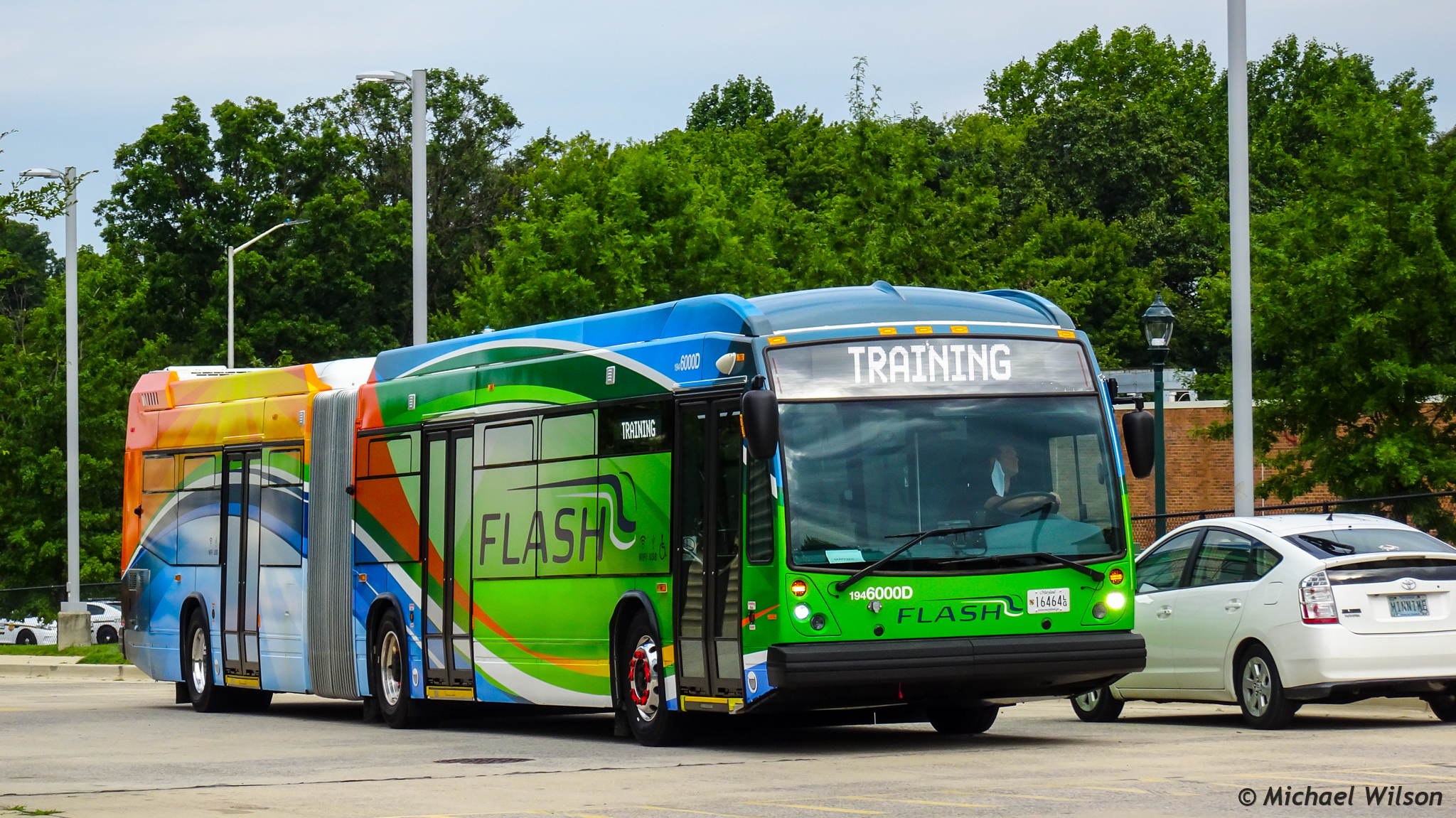
Flash BRT articulated bus

Flash is a bus rapid transit network that began service on October 14, 2020. The first route operates between Silver Spring Metro station and Downtown Columbia along US Route 29. The second route operates between Silver Spring Metro station and Briggs Chaney Park and Ride along US Route 29. Future routes are in development throughout Montgomery County. Flash has dedicated bus stops and operates in a mix of traffic and dedicated lanes using articulated buses.

== Fares ==
In 2009, the agency stopped the issue or acceptance of paper transfers, requiring all riders to use the WMATA operated SmarTrip system in order to get discounted fares and free transfers. Fares were suspended from March 2020 to July 2022 in response to COVID-19. A month later, Ride On set one-way fares at $1.00 regardless of payment method, while qualified riders were allowed to continue riding fare free.

In 2025, the Montgomery County Council elected to make all the buses free, eliminating all the fares starting on June 29, 2025.

== Fleet ==
Ride On has a fleet consisting of diesel, CNG, and battery electric buses produced by Gillig Corporation, Nova Bus, and Starcraft. Its operations are divided among three garages: Nicholson (Kensington), Silver Spring, and Gaithersburg. The agency has a climate action plan to transition to a completely zero–emissions fleet by 2035. A solar microgrid for battery electric buses was installed at the Silver Spring garage in 2022 and at the Gaithersburg garage in 2026.

Image	Year	Make/model	Fleet numbers	Engine	Transmission	Notes
	2008	Gillig Low-Floor 40 ft	5726–5746	Cummins ISL EPA 2007	Allison B400R5–B400R6	Final order of buses with the 2nd-Generation Blue/White livery.; All units originally retired in 2022, 5737, 5744, and 5746 re-entered service in 2023 for FLASH service.; Non-FLASH units saw occasional use from 2024–2026, after which they were retired and sold for scrapping.; Some units that retired in 2022, never returned to service and were sold for scrapping.; 5729 and 5731 retired due to accident damages.
	2009	Gillig Low-Floor 40 ft	5747–5757	Cummins ISL EPA 2007	Allison B400R5–B400R6	First order of buses with the 3rd-Generation Blue/Yellow/Green Livery.; Buses currently being withdrawn and being replaced by Gillig EVs. Only 5747–5750 & 5754 remain active.; 5751 and 5753 used only for operator training.; 5752 & 5757 retired in 2021 and were used as spares donors until being sold for scrap in 2026.; 5755 & 5756 were retired in 2026 and 5756 was auctioned off the same year in September.
	2009	Gillig Low-Floor 29 ft	5007–5031	Cummins ISL EPA 2007	Allison B400R5	Initially retired from 2020–2022 and replaced by 42001D–42039D, 5008, 5011, 5017, 5025 and 5027 reactivated in 2022 for the launch of route 27.; 5008 was involved in two separate incidents, once crashing into a KFC in Glenmont in 2011, and crashing into a house in Silver Spring in 2023, after which the unit was retired.; 5027 retired in 2026 after colliding with a dump truck.; Only 5017 & 5025 remain in service.
	2013	Gillig Low-Floor 40 ft	5759–5770	Cummins ISL9 EPA 2013	Allison B400R6	
	2013	Gillig Low-Floor 29 ft	5032–5059	Cummins ISL9 EPA 2013	Allison B400R6	All units re-wrapped into the 4th Gen Livery in 2024.; Ordered as emergency replacements for fire-prone champion cutaway buses, which were withdrawn in 2012.
	2014	Gillig Low-Floor 29 ft	5060–5091	Cummins ISL9 EPA 2013	Allison B400R6	Last order to use the 4-digit 5000-series numbering system.; 5091 retired in 2021 due to fire damage.; 5072 retired in 2025 due to an accident.; 5080 is currently out of service after being involved in a multi-vehicle accident while not being in service in August 2026.; Some units got re-wrapped into the 4th-Gen Livery.
	2014	Gillig Low-Floor 40 ft CNG	5837–5855	Cummins Westport ISL–G EPA 2013	Allison B400R6	First Gillig CNG buses ordered by Ride On and replaced the remaining Orion V CNGs.; 5840 retired following a collision with a truck in 2016.; 5842 is indefinitely out of service after being involved in a fatal accident in 2026.; 5843 was retrofitted with an EPA 2024-compliant Cummins-Westport L9N engine.
	2016	Gillig Low-Floor 40 ft	44000D–44039D	Cummins ISL9 EPA 2013	Allison B400R6	First bus order to use a 5-digit 44000-series numbering system, including a letter denoting the fuel source.
	2016	Gillig Low-Floor 40 ft CNG	44040C–44055C	Cummins Westport ISL–G EPA 2013	Allison B400R6	
	2016	Gillig Low-Floor 29 ft	42000D	Cummins ISL9 EPA 2013	Allison B400R6	
	2016	Ford E-450 Allstar	59–61	Ford 6.8L Triot V10	Ford TorqShift 6R410 6-Speed Automatic	Used only on route 301.; Contracted to JCA.; 60 is retired.
	2017	Gillig BRT Plus 40 ft	44056D–44072D	Cummins L9 EPA 2017	Allison B400R6	Ordered for the launch of Ride On extRa route 101 in 2017. They are also used on the Pink and Lime routes since their 2024 launch.; Sometimes used as FLASH contingency units in the event of icy weather.
	2017	Gillig Low-Floor 40 ft	44073D–44080D	Cummins L9 EPA 2017	Allison B400R6	
	2017–2018	Gillig Low-Floor 40 ft CNG	44081C–44118C	Cummins Westport L9N EPA 2017	Allison B400R6	44115C–44118C were built in 2018 but are noted as being built in 2017.; 44118C used only for operator training.; 44104C and 44115C retired due to accident damages.; 44101C is indefinitely out of service after an accident in May 2025.
	2019	Gillig Low-Floor 40 ft CNG	44119C–44141C	Cummins Westport L9N EPA 2019	Allison B400R6	Last CNG order for Ride On.; 44129C–44137C were wrapped in the Ride On extRa livery from 2024–2026. Re-wrapped back into the regular livery after being replaced by Gillig EVs in the Ride On extRa scheme.; 44138C–44139C in the Ride On extRa livery.; 44131C retired due to accident damage.; 44141C used only for operator training.
	2019	Gillig Low-Floor 40 ft	44142D–44144D	Cummins L9 EPA 2019	Allison B400R6	
	2019	Ford Transit Cutaway	41000D–41006D	Ford 3.2L PowerStroke I-5	Ford 6R80 6-Speed Automatic	Used for FLEX On-Demand Services.
	2019–2020	NovaBus LFS Artic	46000D–46015D	Cummins L9 EPA 2019	Allison B500R6	Second non–WMATA articulated bus operator in the region, and Ride On's only NovaBus Order.; 46000D–46015D were built in 2020 but are noted as being built in 2019.; Used on the FLASH BRT.; Units to receive mid-life overhaul in FY27
	2020	Gillig Low-Floor 40 ft	44145D–44153D		Allison B400R6	
	2020–2021	Gillig Low-Floor 29 ft	42001D–42039D	Cummins L9 EPA 2019–EPA 2021	Allison B400R6	Ride On’s last clean-diesel bus order.; 42020D–42039D were built in 2021 but are noted as being built in 2020.; 42039D only used for operator training.
	2022	Gillig Low-Floor Plus 40 ft EV	44154E–44163E	Cummins/Accelera BES		First Gillig EVs delivered to a DC region operator.
	2024	Gillig Low-Floor Plus 40 ft EV	44164E–44175E	Cummins/Accelera BES		44165E in the Ride On extRa livery.; Replaced some 2009 Gillig Hybrids.
	2025	Gillig Low-Floor Plus 40 ft EV	44176E–44236E	Cummins/Accelera BES		44225E–44236E in the Ride On extRa livery.; Replaced the remaining 2009, all 2011, and some 2012 Gillig Hybrid Buses, the sole 2011 Gillig Diesel, and the 2019 Proterra Catalyst Battery Electric Buses.
	2026	Gillig Low-Floor Plus 40 ft EV	44237E–44257E	Cummins/Accelera BES		44254E–44257E in the FLASH livery.; Replaced Ride-On's remaining 2012 Gillig Hybrid Buses, and are currently replacing older Gillig LF40 diesel buses from 2008–2009.
	2026	New Flyer Industries XHE60	46016H–46028H	Ballard FCmove-HD+ fuel cell; ZF AVE 130 (center axle); Cummins/Accelera ELFA3 (rear axle)		46016H was the first unit revealed by MCDOT in May 2026..; Units are expected to start entering service in spring/summer 2027.; First Xcelsior buses for Ride On, and the first hydrogen fuel cell buses in the DC region.

== Retired Fleet ==
These buses previousley served Ride-On before being retired and sent for scrapping. Some units may be repurposed for other purposes, including public safety training.

Image	Year	Model	Numbers	Engine	Transmisson	Notes
	1975	Grumman Cutaway	5025–5044	Unknown		Ride-On's first buses
	1976-1978	Carpenter Cutaway	5045–5094	Unknown		
	1978	Superior	5095–5100	Unknown		
	1979-1981	TMC T-30 CityCruiser	5101–5256	Caterpillar 3126	Allison MT-740	Joint order with Frederick's TransIT; Originally had Detroit Diesel 6V53T Engines
	1980	GMC Cutaway	5008	Unknown		
	1984	Orion I	5257–5297	Detroit Diesel 6V71N	Allison MT-643	
	1987-1988	Ford E-350 Cutaway	5017–5032	Unknown		
	1988-1989	Gillig Phantom 30ft	5300–5356	Cummins C8.3	Allison MT-647	Originally fitted with Caterpillar 3208T engines, the only transit Phantoms to be fitted with such engines. Replaced to Cummins C8.3 Engines in the 1990's.; Ride-On's first Gillig Order.
	1990-1991	Orion I	5500–5545	Detroit Diesel 6V92TA	Allison HTB-748	
	1991,1993	Ford E-350 Cutaway	5037–5043	Unknown		
	1993	Orion V	5546–5547	Detroit Diesel 6V92TA	Allison HTB-748	
	1993	Flxible Metro "D" LNG	5700–5703	Cummins C8.3G	Unknown	ex-MTA Maryland buses, purchased in 1995.; Assigned to the Gaithersburg division and regularly used on the Route 70 Express.; Had the most number of seats for any bus in Ride-On's fleet.
	1994	Ford E-350	5048–5050	Unknown		
	1994-1997	Gillig Phantom 35ft	5360–5409	Detroit Diesel Series 50	Voith DIWA 863.3	
	1995	Orion VI CNG	5801–5802	Cummins L10G	Allison B400R4	Ex-Orion Demo units.; Rarely used under Ride-On, retired in 2005 and replaced by C40LFs.
	1996	Orion V	5550–5565	Cummins M11	Voith DIWA 863.3	
	1996	Orion V CNG	5997–5999	Cummins L10G	ZF EcoMat HP590	
	1997	Orion V	5100–5129	Detroit Diesel Series 50	Allison B400R5	ex-WMATA units, purchased in 2012 to replace Fire-Prone Champion Cutaways, alongside the introduction of 2013 and 2014 Gillig Low-Floor 30ft units.
	1998	Orion V	5572–5579	Cummins M11E	Voith DIWA 863.3	
	1999	Gillig Phantom 35ft	5410–5423	Cummins ISM	Allison B400R5	Ride-On's last Gillig Phantom Order
	1999, 2001-2002	Orion V	5705–5725 and 5580–5623,l	Detroit Diesel Series 50	Voith DIWA 864.3	
	1999-2000	Orion V CNG	5803–5821	Detroit Diesel Series 50G	Voith DIWA 863.4	
	2001	Ford E-450	5201–5212	Unknown		
	2001-2002	IC/Eldorado Aero-Elites	5101–5181	Unknown		
	2003-2005	Orion VII OG 35ft CNG	5900–5957	Detroit Diesel Series 50G, Cummins-Westport C-Gas Plus	Voith DIWA 864.3E, ZF EcoMat 5HP962C	Last Orion order for Ride-On
	2005	New Flyer C40LF	5822–5836	Cummins-Westport C-Gas Plus	Allison B400R5	First order by Ride-On for New Flyer Buses.; Withdrawn in 2020 due to rear door malfunctions amid the COVID-19 Pandemic.
	2006-2007	Gillig Low-Floor 40ft Hybrid	5300–5313	Cummins ISB EPA 2004	Allison EP40 Hybrid System	First Gillig Low-Floors ordered by Ride-On.; Ride-On's first Hybrid-Electric buses.; Renumbered from 5750–5763 due to the arrival of the 2009 Gillig Low-Floor 40’ Diesels and Hybrids (5314–5348 and 5747–5757); 5312 retired in 2017 due to fire damage.
	2007	IC/GMC Champion Cutaways	5182–5296	International VT365	Allison 2000	Withdrawn suddenly in 2012 due to a series of fires. Replaced by Orion Vs bought from WMATA and the 2013-2014 Gillig 30-footers.
	2008	Gillig Low-Floor 30ft	5001–5006	Cummins ISL EPA 2007	Allison B400R6	First 30-Foot Gillig Low-Floor order for Ride-On.; 5001 used for training until around 2024-2025.
	2009	Gillig Low-Floor 40ft Hybrid	5314–5348	Cummins ISB EPA 2007	Allison EP40 Hybrid System	Ride-On's largest hybrid order.; 5314 renumbered from 5349.; 5329 retired in 2024 after being hit head-on by a WMATA XD40 at the Silver Spring Transit Center.; 5348 retired following a collision in 2017.; Replaced by Electric Buses in 2025.
	2011	Gillig Low-Floor 40ft	5758	Cummins ISL9 EPA 2010	Allison B400R6	Sole 2011 Diesel unit built, and the only diesel bus in Ride-On's fleet to use an EPA10 Cummins ISL9 Engine.; Replaced by Electric Buses in 2026.
	2011–2012	Gillig Low-Floor 40ft Hybrid	5349–5367	Cummins ISB6.7 EPA 2010	Allison EP40 Hybrid System	Replaced by Gillig Electric buses from 2025–2026.; 5363 was Ride-On's last operational Hybrid Bus, retiring on May 1st 2026 and thus concluding 20 years of hybrids with Ride-On.
	2019	Proterra Catalyst BE-35	43000E–43003E	Eaton/UQM		Ride-On's first electric buses.; Retired from 2024–2025 as a result of Proterra's Bankruptcy and the resulting shortage of spare parts.

== Divisions ==
The bus fleet, owned and operated by Ride On, is distributed among three garages that are Nicholson, Silver Spring and Gaithersburg.

Garage	Address	Capacity	Routes	Buses	Notes
Silver Spring	8710 Brookville Road Silver Spring, MD 20910	200	1, 2, 4, 5, 8, 9, 11, 12, 13, 14, 15, 16, 17, 18, 19, 20, 21, 22, 24, 25, 26, 27, 28, 30, 34, 36, 39, 40, 41, 47, and 51 Weekends: 23, 29, 38, and 42	Diesel: 5759–5761, 5769–5770, 44000D–44024D, 44145D–44153D, 5017, 5025, 5069–5079, 5081–5090, 42000D, 42023D–42025D, and 42037D–42038D; Electric: 44154E–44164E, 44166E–44224E, 44237E–44241E	Served by route 2.; Underwent renovations to include a solar microgrid for battery electric buses.; First division to receive and operate electric buses.; Houses most of the Ride On Gillig Low Floor Plus Battery EV 40' fleet (all the Ride On extRa and FLASH units are stored at the Gaithersburg division with some regular service units).; Previously housed Diesel-Hybrid Buses until 2026.
Gaithersburg	16700 Crabbs Branch Way Gaithersburg, MD 20855	200	43, 46, 48, 49, 54, 55, 56, 57, 58, 59, 60, 61, 63, 64, 65, 66, 67, 70, 71, 73, 74, 75, 76, 78, 79, 90, 100, 101, Lime, Pink, FLASH Blue, and FLASH Orange Weekends: 45, 83, 97, and 98	Regular routes: Diesel: 5747–5750, 5754, 5762–5768, 44025D–44039D, 44073D–44080D, 44142D–44144D, 42026D–42036D; Training diesels: 5751, 5753 & 42039D; CNG: 5837–5839, 5841, 5843–5854, 44040C–44055C, 44081C–44103C 44105C–44114C, 44116C–44117C, 44119C–44130C, 44132C–44137C and 44140C; Training CNGs: 5855, 44118C, and 44141C; Electric: 44242E–44253E; Ride On extRa: Diesel: 44056D–44072D; CNG: 44138C–44139C; Electric: 44165E and 44225E–44236E; FLASH BRT: Diesel: 5737, 5744, 5746, and 46000D–46015D; Electric: 44254E–44257E; Hydrogen: 46016H–46028H	Stores and maintains the training fleet.; Stores and maintains Ride On's CNG fleet & Fuel Cell Fleet.; Maintenance base for all FLASH and RideOn extRa buses.
Nicholson	4700 Nicholson Court Kensington, MD 20895	68	Weekdays: 6, 7, 23, 29, 31, 32, 33, 37, 38, 42, 44, 45, 52, 53, 81, 83, 96, 97,98, and Ride On Flex Midday: 47 and 75 Late night: 30 and 75	Diesel: 5032–5068 and 42001D–42022D; Flex: 41000D–41006D	Only houses 30 ft buses.; Weekdays only as of October 2021; Maintenance Base for Flex On-Demand Service Vehicles.; Is planned to close in 2030
Shady Grove (Unofficial)	16651 Crabbs Branch Way, Derwood, MD	Any open space	None (Storage for retired buses)	Diesel: 5001, 5027, 5080, 5755; Hybrid: 5319, 5326, 5328, 5333, 5341, 5349–5350, 5352, 5354, 5356–5360; Electric: 43000E–43003E; CNG: 5842, 44101C, 44104C, 44115C, and 44131C	Shared with the MCPS Shady Grove school bus lots.; Stores retired buses awaiting sale for reuse or scrapping.
