= Tenleytown-Brookland Line =

C61
- Tenleytown-Brookland Line

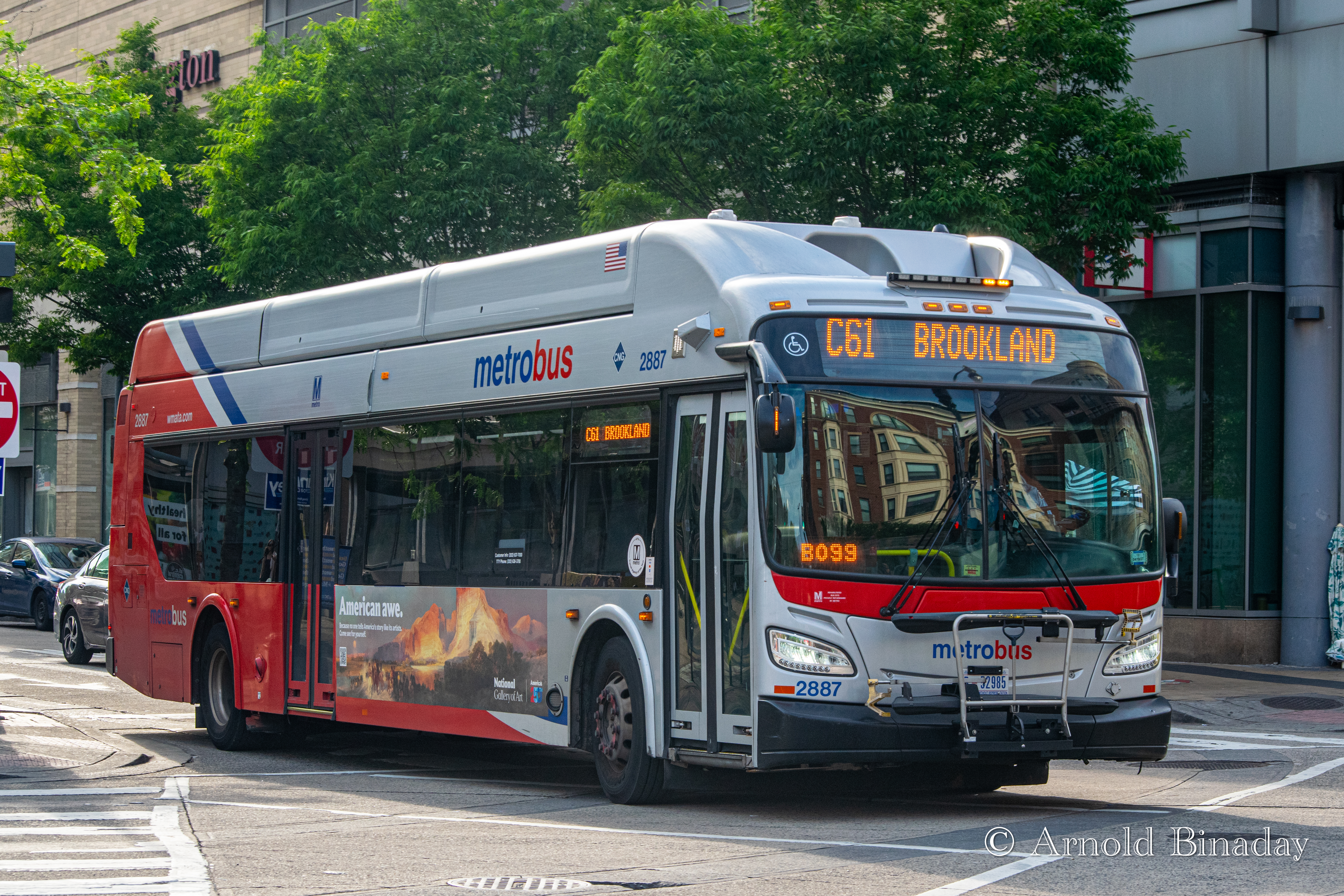
- Route C61 in Columbia Heights

Overview
- System: Metrobus
- Operator: Washington Metropolitan Area Transit Authority
- Garage: Bladensburg
- Livery: Local
- Status: Active
- Predecessors: H2, H4

Route
- Locale: Northeast, Northwest
- Communities served: Tenleytown, Forest Hills, Cleveland Park, Columbia Heights, Rock Creek Park, Mount Pleasant, Park View, Stronghold, Brookland
- Landmarks served: Brookland station, Basilica of the National Shrine of the Immaculate Conception, Catholic University of America, Trinity Washington University, Children's National Hospital, MedStar Washington Hospital Center, MedStar National Rehabilitation Hospital, VA Medical Center, Columbia Heights station, DC USA, Cleveland Park station, Tenleytown station
- Start: Brookland station
- Via: Wisconsin Avenue NW, Porter Street NW, Columbia Road / Irving Street NW, Michigan Avenue NW/NE
- End: Tenleytown station
- Length: 40-50 minutes

Service
- Level: Daily
- Frequency: 12 minutes (6AM - 9PM); 20 minutes (After 9PM)
- Operates: 24 Hours
- Ridership: 838,904 (H2, FY 2025); 1,060,108 (H4, FY 2025)
- Transfers: SmarTrip only
- Timetable: Tenleytown–Brookland Line

The Tenleytown-Brookland Line, designated Route C61, is a daily bus route operated by the Washington Metropolitan Area Transit Authority between Brookland station and Tenleytown station of the Red Line of the Washington Metro. The line operates every 12 minutes between 6AM and 9PM, and 20 minutes between 9PM and 6AM daily. Trips roughly take 40-50 minutes to complete.

== Background ==
The C61 operates daily between Brookland station and Tenleytown station. The route connects Brookland and Tenleytown stations by bus without having to take the Red Line. The C61 currently operates out of Bladensburg division.

=== C61 stops ===
Bus stop	Direction	Connections
Fort Drive NW / Albemarle Street NW Tenleytown station	Eastbound stop, Westbound terminal	Washington Metro: Metrobus: C51, C81, C85, C87, D80, D82, D90; AU Shuttle
Wisconsin Avenue NW / Albemarle Street NW Tenleytown station	Eastbound	Washington Metro: Metrobus: C51, C81, C85, C87, D80, D82, D90; AU Shuttle
Wisconsin Avenue NW / Tenley Circle NW	Eastbound	Metrobus: C51, C81, C85, D80, D82, D90
Wisconsin Avenue NW / Veazey Street NW	Westbound	Metrobus: C51, C85, D80, D82
Wisconsin Avenue NW / Van Ness Street NW	Eastbound	Metrobus: C51, C85, D80, D82
Wisconsin Avenue NW / Upton Street NW	Bidirectional	Metrobus: C51, C85, D80, D82
Wisconsin Avenue NW / Rodman Street NW	Bidirectional	Metrobus: C51, C85, D80, D82
Porter Street NW / Wisconsin Avenue NW	Bidirectional	Metrobus: C51, C85, D80, D82
Porter Street NW / 35th Street NW	Bidirectional	
Porter Street NW / 34th Street NW	Bidirectional	
Porter Street NW / #3040	Eastbound	
Porter Street NW / #3055	Westbound	
Porter Street NW / Connecticut Avenue NW Cleveland Park station	Bidirectional	Washington Metro: Metrobus: D70, D72
Porter Street NW / #2723	Westbound	Metrobus: D72
Porter Street NW / #2724	Eastbound	Metrobus: D72
Porter Street NW / #2501	Westbound	Metrobus: D72
Porter Street NW / #2500	Eastbound	Metrobus: D72
Adams Mill Road NW / Klingle Road NW	Westbound	Metrobus: D72
Adams Mill Road NW / Walbridge Place NW	Bidirectional	
Irving Street NW / Adams Mill Road NW	Eastbound	
Adams Mill Road NW / Irving Street NW	Westbound	
Harvard Street NW / Adams Mill Road NW	Westbound	
Irving Street NW / Hobart Street NW	Eastbound	
Harvard Street NW / Argonne Place NW	Westbound	Metrobus: D72, D74
Irving Street NW / 16th Street NW	Eastbound	Metrobus: D60, D6X, D72, D74
Columbia Road NW / 16th Street NW	Westbound	D60, D6X, D72, D74
Irving Street NW / 14th Street NW Columbia Heights station	Eastbound	Washington Metro: Metrobus: D50, D5X, D74
Columbia Road NW / 14th Street NW Columbia Heights station	Westbound	Washington Metro: Metrobus: D50, D5X, D74
Irving Street NW / 13th Street NW	Eastbound	Metrobus: D74
Columbia Road NW / 13th Street NW	Westbound	Metrobus: D74
Irving Street NW / 11th Street NW	Eastbound	Metrobus: C63, D44, D74
Columbia Road NW / 11th Street NW	Westbound	Metrobus: C63, D44, D74
Irving Street NW / Georgia Avenue NW	Eastbound	Metrobus: C63, D40, D4X
Columbia Road NW / Georgia Avenue NW	Westbound	Metrobus: C63, D40, D4X
Irving Street NW / Warder Street NW	Eastbound	Metrobus: C63
Columbia Road NW / Warder Street NW	Westbound	Metrobus: C63
Irving Street NW / Park Place NW	Eastbound	Metrobus: C63
First Street NW / Hospital Center Drive NW	Bidirectional	Metrobus: C63, D36
First Street NW / Michigan Avenue NW	Westbound	Metrobus: C63, D36
Michigan Avenue NW / First Street NW	Eastbound	Metrobus: C63, D36
Michigan Avenue NW / North Capitol Street NW	Eastbound	Metrobus: C63, D30, D36
Michigan Avenue NE / North Capitol Street NE	Bidirectional	Metrobus: C63, D30, D36
Michigan Avenue NE / Franklin Street NE	Bidirectional	Metrobus: C63, D30
Michigan Avenue NE / Irving Street NE	Bidirectional	Metrobus: C63, D30
Michigan Avenue NE / 4th Street NE	Eastbound	Metrobus: C63, D30
Michigan Avenue NE / Gibbons Hall Catholic University of America	Westbound	Metrobus: C63, D30
Monroe Street NE / 7th Street NE	Bidirectional	Metrobus: C63, D30, D34
Brookland station Bus Bay B	Westbound stop, Eastbound terminal	Washington Metro: Metrobus: C63, D30, D34, D74, P33; CUA Shuttle: Blue, Green; ACHS Shuttle: Brookland Metro; Metropolitan Branch Trail

== History ==
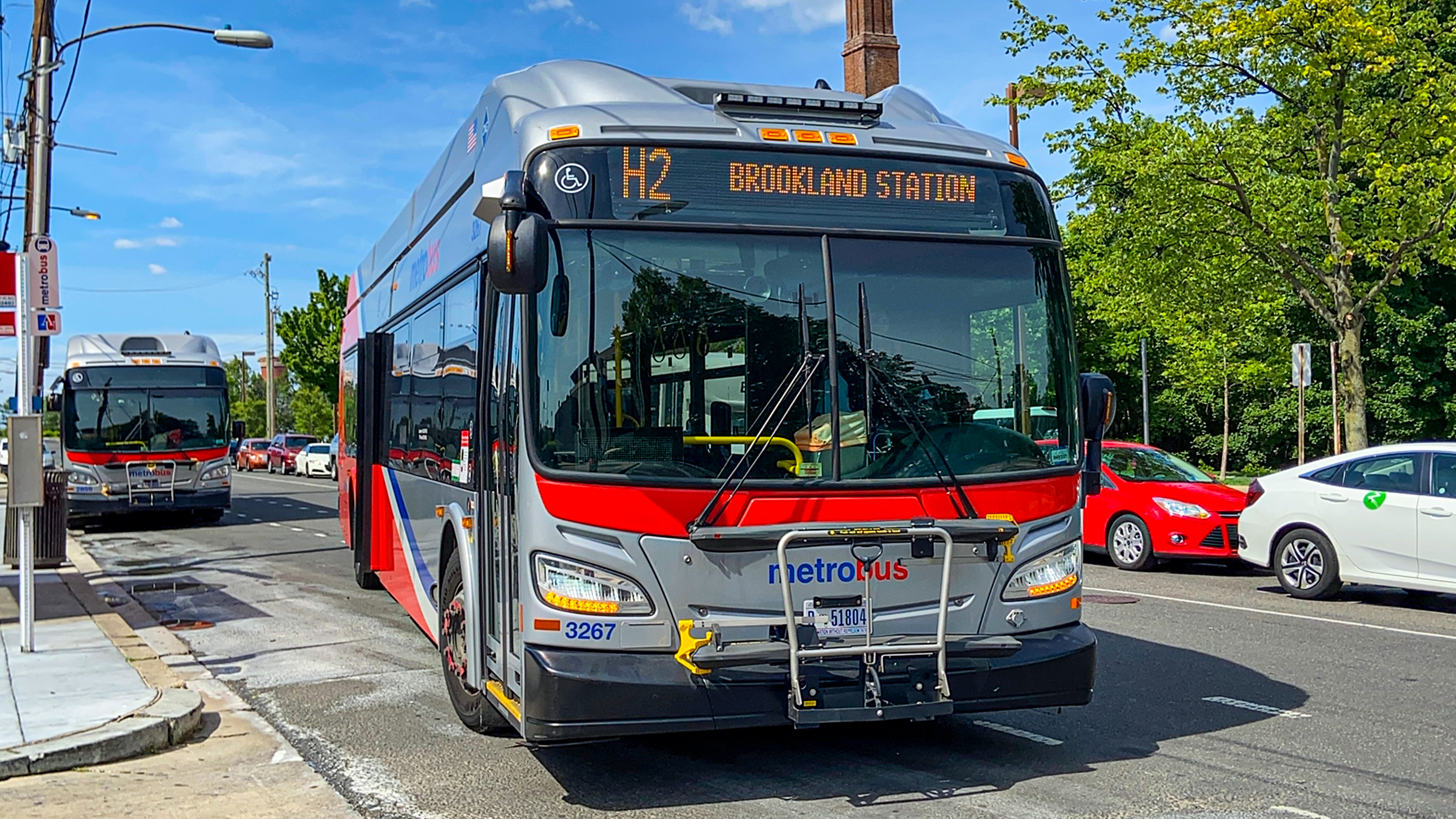
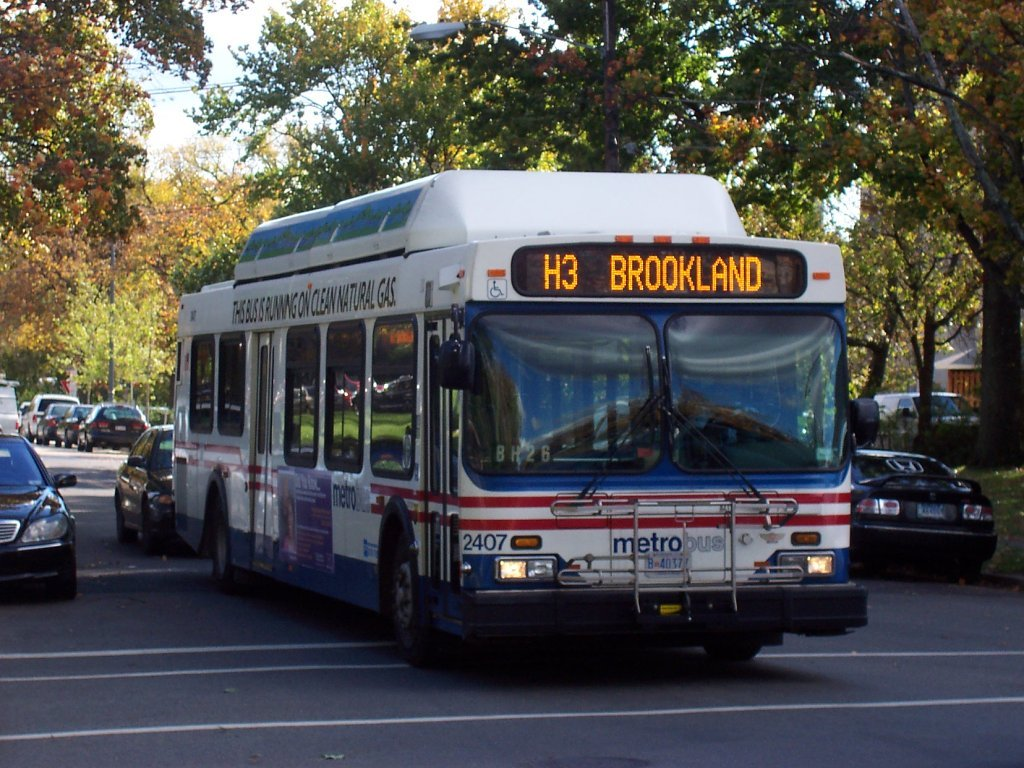
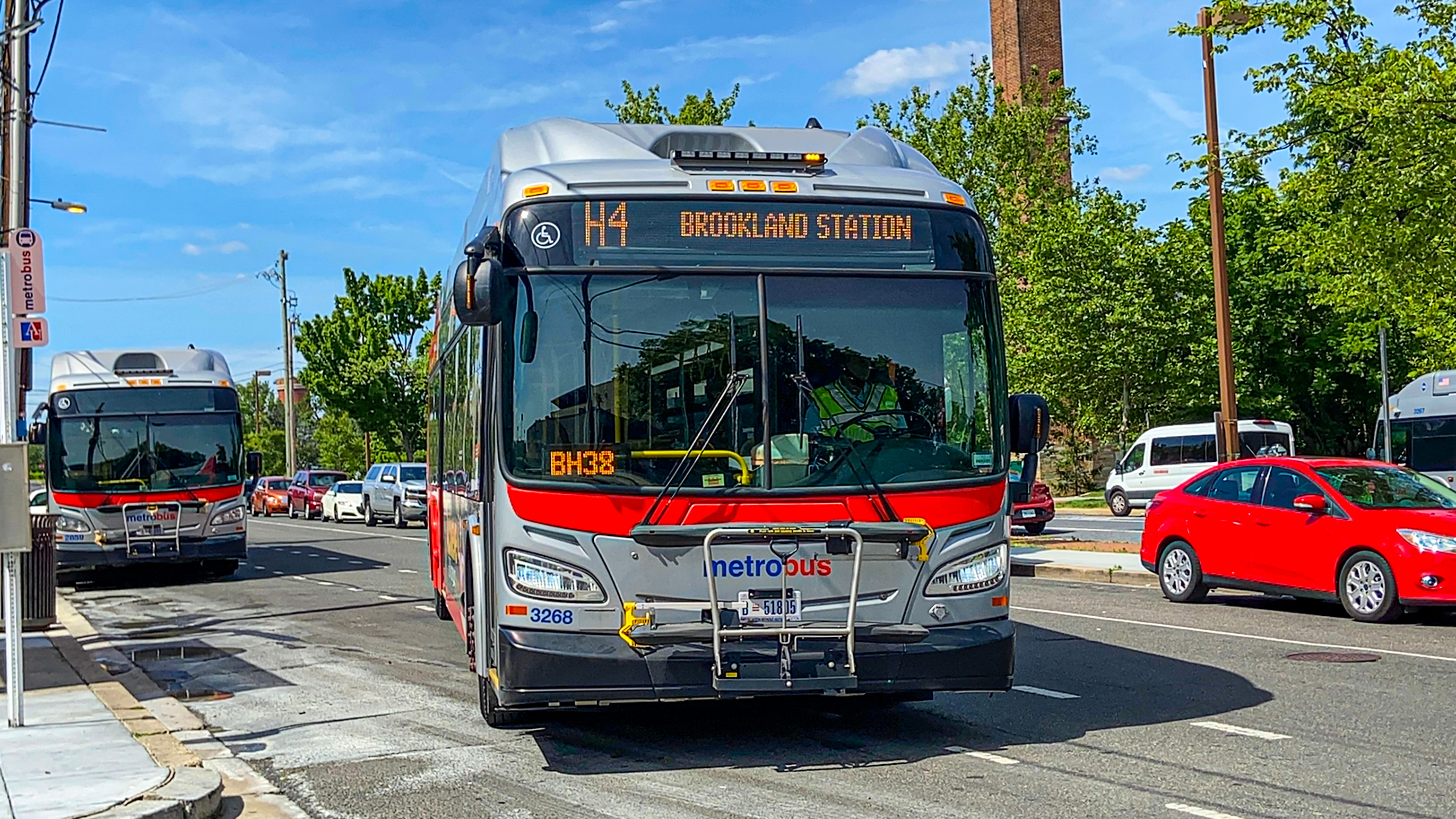
Former Routes H2, H3, and H4.

Routes H2 and H4 originally operated under streetcars by the Capital Traction Company. The line was then made into buses in the 1920s. Routes H2 and H4 operated between Fort Lincoln and Westmoreland Circle connecting Tenleytown, Forest Hills, Cleveland Park, Mount Pleasant, Columbia Heights, Rock Creek Park, Brookland along Yuma Street, Massachusetts Avenue, Wisconsin Avenue, Porter Street NW (H4), Van Ness/Veazey Street NW (H2), Connecticut Avenue (H2), Columbia Road NW, Irving Street NW, Michigan Avenue NW/NE, Franklin Street NE, and 14th Street NE. It mostly provides service in outer DC without having to enter Downtown.

The line was later acquired by DC Transit in 1956 and later diverted to serve the Washington Hospital Complexes along 1st Street. It later became a Metrobus route in 1973.

On February 19, 1978, after Brookland–CUA station opened, routes H2 and H4 were diverted off Monroe Street to serve the new station. This gives residents access to the Red Line on its route. No route changes were made during its route.

On August 25, 1984, routes H2 and H4 were rerouted off Tenley Circle to serve Tenleytown–AU station in the middle of its route when it opened. No route changes were made on the route.

On September 18, 1999, after Columbia Heights station Route H2 was shortened to terminate at Van Ness–UDC station and Route H4 was shortened to terminate at Tenleytown–AU station. Service to Westmoreland Circle and along Yuma Street was replaced by a new route N8 which operated between Van Ness and Wesley Heights. This was due to resident complaint along Yuma Street and Tenleytown over H2 and H4 buses making loud noises along Yuma street causing noise pollution and damage to homes. The new N8 solves the noise complaint problem by using smaller and quieter 30 ft buses. Routes H2 and H4 were also shortened from Fort Lincoln to Brookland–CUA station with the portion between the two points replaced by a new route H6, which operates on the former route H2 and H4 routing.

A new route H3 was introduced to operate alongside route H4 during the weekday peak-hours between Brookland and Tenleytown stations following route H2's routing in Mount Pleasant and route H4 routing along Porter Street and Wisconsin Avenue plus operating along Reno Road. The main difference is route H3 would not serve the Hospital Complexes along 1st street and instead remain along Michigan Avenue.

On June 25, 2000, route H3 was rerouted along the H4 routing on Mount Pleasant Street, Park and Klingle roads instead of operating along Adams Mill Road, Irving Street, and Harvard Street where the H2 operates.

In 2010 during WMATA's FY2011 budget year, WMATA proposed to reroute route H2 back to Tenleytown–AU station discontinuing service to Van Ness–UDC station in order to replace route N8 which is proposed to be eliminated due to declining ridership. Route H2 would operate along Van Ness Street, Reno Road, Veazey Street, and Wisconsin Avenue. Route H3 would also be rerouted between the intersections of Porter Street & Reno Road NW and Wisconsin Avenue & Veazey Street NW via Porter Street and Wisconsin Avenue which follows the current H4 route. Alternative service along Connecticut Avenue to Van Ness will be available on routes L1, L2, and L4.

On December 19, 2010, route H2 was rerouted to turn on Van Ness Street, Reno Road, Veazey Street, and Wisconsin Avenue to serve Tenleytown–AU station in order to replace the N8 routing along those streets which was shortened to Tenleytown station. Route H3 service was also rerouted to remain on Porter Street and turn onto Wisconsin Avenue and follow the H4 routing to Tenleytown station. Service along Reno Street where the H3 operated plus H2 service to Van Ness–UDC station, and H3 service inside the Hospital Complex was discontinued. Routes L1, L2, and L4 took over the discontinued portion of the H2 along Connecticut Avenue but there was no alternative service is provided on Reno Road.

In September 2013, during WMATA's FY2014 budget year, WMATA proposed to convert route H3 into a MetroExtra limited-stop route and extend the route to Rhode Island Avenue–Brentwood station via 12th street and Rhode Island Avenue. This was to provide a more direct connection between Rhode Island Ave station, the hospital center complex, and Columbia Heights and provide a faster ride across town by limiting the number of stops. The current H3 routing between Brookland and Tenleytown, weekday service frequency and span of service will remain unaffected. Route H3 will serve the following stops:

- Rhode Island Avenue–Brentwood station
- Brookland–CUA station
- Michigan Avenue & 1st Street NW
- Georgia Avenue
- 11th Street
- 14th Street
- 16th Street
- Park Road & Mount Pleasant Street
- Porter Street & Connecticut Avenue
- Porter Street & Wisconsin Avenue
- Tenleytown–AU station

Existing local stops will still be provided by routes H2 and H4.

During the COVID-19 pandemic, all route H3 was suspended and route H2 and H4 was reduced to operate on its Saturday supplemental schedule beginning on March 16, 2020. However on March 18, 2020, the line was further reduced to operate on its Sunday schedule. On March 21, 2020, route H2 weekend service was suspended and route H4 service was reduced to operate every 30 minutes. Additional service was added and Route H2 weekend service was restored on August 23, 2020, however route H3 remained suspended.

In September 2020, WMATA proposed to eliminate all route H3 service due to low federal funds. Later in February 2021 during WMATA's FY2022 budget crisis, WMATA proposed to increase span to add late-night service to 2:00 AM on Route H4 between July and December 2021 in the first half of the fiscal year. However in the second half of the fiscal year beginning in January 2022, WMATA proposed to reroute the H2 and H4 to Friendship Heights station via Connecticut Avenue NW north of Calvert Street NW to replace the L1 and L2 beginning in January 2022. WMATA also proposed to operate the H2 via Columbia Road and Calvert Streets NW to Connecticut Avenue and eliminate service on Adams Mill Road & Harvard Street NW. Service after midnight, and service to Tenleytown–AU station, on Porter Street between Connecticut and Wisconsin Avenues, Wisconsin Avenue, and on Van Ness Street between Connecticut and Wisconsin Avenues and on Veazey Street would be eliminated. Subsequently on April 22, 2021, WMATA approved the FY2022 budget and received federal funding to avoid service cuts.

On June 6, 2021, late-night service was increased to operate up to 2:00 AM on Route H4.

On June 10, 2021, WMATA proposed to increase the H2 and H4 to operate every 12 minutes daily between 7:00 AM to 9:00 PM daily as part of WMATA's Pandemic Recovery Plan.

On September 5, 2021, service was increased to operate every 12 minutes between both routes between 7:00 AM to 9:00 PM. However, route H3 service was never restored.

Due to rising cases of the COVID-19 Omicron variant, the line was reduced to its Saturday service on weekdays. Full weekday service resumed on February 7, 2022.

On December 17, 2023, new 24 hour service was added to Route H4.

=== Better Bus Redesign ===
In 2022, WMATA launched its Better Bus Redesign project, which aimed to redesign the entire Metrobus Network and is the first full redesign of the agency's bus network in its history.

In April 2023, WMATA launched its Draft Visionary Network. As part of the drafts, WMATA proposed to combine the H2 and H4 into one route. The new route named Route DC103 in the proposals, would still operate between Brookland and Tenleytown, but the route would no longer loop inside MedStar Washington Hospital Center or Washington VA Medical Center, and instead from the intersection of Michigan Avenue NE & Irving Street NW, the route would operate along Irving Street, and 1st Street before operating on the H2 routing along Columbia Road NW, Irving Street NW, Harvard Street NW, and Adam Mills Road NW. The route would follow the H4 routing from the intersection of Klingle Road NW & Adam Mills Road NW to Tenleytown station, operating along Klingle Road NW, Porter Street NW and Wisconsin Avenue NW. Service to the MedStar Washington Hospital Center and Washington VA Medical Center was to be served by the proposed Route DC303 between the Hospital Center and Potomac Park. H4 service along Mount Pleasant Street and Park Road was taken over by the proposed Route DC104, operating similarly to the current Routes 42 and 43, and H2 service along Veazey Street NW, Van Ness Street NW, and Connecticut Avenue NW was not included in the drafts.

During WMATA's Revised Draft Visionary Network, WMATA renamed the DC103 to Route C61, and modified the route to remain along Michigan Avenue NE and serve 1st Street before operating along Irving Street and vice versa, with the remainder of the route remaining the same. Route DC303 was also retained and renamed to Route C59, with service to the Washington Hospital Center Complex also being served by proposed Routes C63 (DC212) and D36 (Route DC211). A new Route C87 route was also created to operate along the current H2 routing along Van Ness Street NW between Silver Spring station and Van Ness–UDC station via 16th Street NW, Military Road NW, Nebraska Avenue NW, Wisconsin Avenue NW, and Van Ness Street NW. All changes were then proposed during WMATA's 2025 Proposed Network.

On November 21, 2024, WMATA approved its Better Bus Redesign Network.

As part of WMATA's Better Bus Redesign beginning on June 29, 2025, both the H2 and H4 were modified and combined into one route, being renamed into the C61.

The new C61 still operates between Tenleytown and Brookland stations. But the route no longer loops around any of the Washington Hospitals along 1st Street, instead running straight to Irving Street NW, and following the H2 routing to the intersection of Klingle Road NW & Adam Mills Road NW, then operating along the H4 routing to Tenleytown station. Service on Michigan Avenue between Park Place and 1st Street was replaced by Route C63, service along Mount Pleasant Street and Park Road was replaced by Route D72, and service along Connecticut Avenue NW and Van Ness Street NW was replaced by Route C87 during the weekday peak hours only. There was no replacement service along Reno Road and Veazey Street however.

== Incidents ==
- On July 21, 2014, an H4 driver and a 65-year-old male passenger got into an altercation near Tenleytown station after the passenger refused to pay the fare. The man punched the driver in the face while holding a blade in his fist. The driver was sent to the hospital after sustained a laceration to his face. The man was detained by the Metropolitan Police Department and later arrested by Metro Transit Police. The man was charged with assault with a deadly weapon.
- On January 22, 2020, an H4 bus slammed into half a dozen vehicles along Porter Street & Connecticut Avenue in Cleveland Park.
