= Tenleytown–Glover Park Line =

Washington, D.C. bus route

N8
- Tenleytown–Glover Park Line

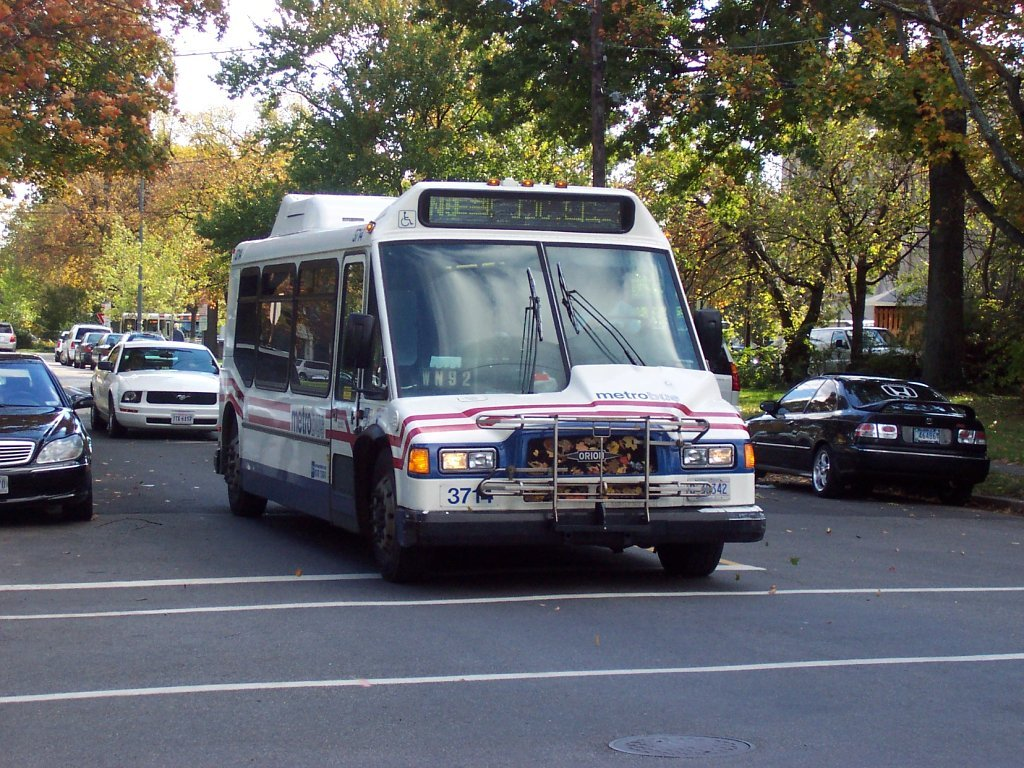
- Route N8 at Tenleytown–AU station in 2006

Overview
- System: Metrobus
- Operator: Washington Metropolitan Area Transit Authority
- Livery: Local
- Status: Discontinued
- Began service: September 1999
- Ended service: September 23, 2011

Route
- Locale: Northwest
- Communities served: Tenleytown, American University Park, Spring Valley, Wesley Heights, Glover Park
- Landmarks served: Tenleytown–AU station, Tenley Circle, American University, Ward Circle, Berkshire Apartments
- Start: Tenleytown–AU station
- Via: Yuma Street NW, Massachusetts Avenue NW, New Mexico Avenue NW
- End: Glover Park (41st St & Davis Pl NW)

The Tenleytown–Glover Park Line, designated Route N8, was a bus route operated by the Washington Metropolitan Area Transit Authority between Tenleytown–AU station of the Red Line of the Washington Metro and Glover Park. The line operated every 20–40 minutes on weekdays only with trips roughly taking 30 minutes. The route was discontinued on September 23, 2011, due to low ridership.

== History ==
Route N8 originally operated between Friendship Heights station and Glen Echo Park which replaced route C1. However, the route was discontinued in the 1990s and replaced by Ride On route 29 which operates on the same route as route N8 but is extended to Bethesda station.

The line was reincarnated as the Van Ness–Wesley Heights Line in 1999 to operate daily service between Van Ness–UDC station and Wesley Heights in conjunction with the District of Columbia Small Bus Program. This was to eliminate the use of larger buses along Yuma Street due to various noise complaints with the larger buses. Route N8 mostly operated along Veazey Street, Van Ness Street, Yuma Street, Massachusetts Avenue, New Mexico Avenue, and Nebraska Avenue. The route also replaced routes H2, H3, and H4 routing to Westmoreland Circle along Yuma Street with H2 terminating at Van Ness and H3, H4 at Tenleytown–AU station. The route mostly connects Wesley Heights residents and American University students to various destinations without having to transfer buses or take the train. The N8 mostly utilized the Orion IIs and 30 ft Orion Vs out of Western division due to its low demand route.

On December 26, 2004, route N8 was extended to Glover Park via New Mexico Avenue to link residents to American University and Spring Valley.

In 2006, WMATA proposed to eliminate weekend service on the N8 due to low ridership. According to WMATA's performance measures, ridership on the route continued to be low averaging 123 passengers on 19 trips Saturday and 117 on 17 trips on Sunday. Performance measures goes as the following:

Performance Measures	Saturday	Sunday	WMATA Guidelines	Pass/Fail
Passengers	123	117	<300	Fail
Passengers Rev/Mile	0.6	0.7	<1	Fail
Passengers Rev/Trip	6	7.0	<8	Fail
Subsidy/Passenger	$11.71	$10.98	>$4.00	Fail
Cost Recovery	5.6%	5.9%	<13%	Fail

On September 24, 2006, weekend service for route N8 was discontinued. Weekday service and its current routing remained unaffected.

In 2010, it was proposed to eliminate the N8 due to low ridership. The Van Ness–UDC station and Tenleytown–AU station sections will be replaced by a rerouted route H2. Alternative service will be provided on the D1, D2, and N2, N4, N6. There will be no alternative service along Yuma Street or New Mexico Avenue and Tunlaw Road between Cathedral Avenue and Edmunds Street, however.

On December 19, 2010, route N8 was shortened to terminate at Tenleytown–AU station with service to Van Ness–UDC station replaced by an extended route H2. The line was also renamed the Tenleytown–Glover Park Line as a result of the changes. Trips after 7:50 PM were also discontinued due to low ridership.

In 2011, WMATA proposed to eliminate the N8 once in for all due to low ridership and not meeting WMATA standards. Performance measures continue to drop below WMATA standards through the years.

Residents were opposed to the elimination of route N8 as it would cause inconvenience to their travel time.

On September 25, 2011, route N8 was officially discontinued due to low ridership. WMATA rerouted route N2 between Friendship Heights station and Ward Circle via Massachusetts Avenue and Western Avenue replacing sections of route N8.

A service between Cathedral Heights and Glover Park would return under WMATA's Better Bus Network redesign in June 2025, combining former routes D2 and N4/N6 via Bethesda station, Friendship Heights station and Dupont Circle station.
