= Glover Park–Dupont Circle Line =

D2
- Glover Park–Dupont Circle Line

Overview
- System: Metrobus
- Operator: Washington Metropolitan Area Transit Authority
- Garage: Western
- Livery: Local
- Status: Discontinued
- Ended service: June 29, 2025

Route
- Locale: Northwest
- Communities served: Glover Park, Burleith, Georgetown, Downtown
- Landmarks served: Glover Park, Burleith, Georgetown, Dupont Circle station
- Start: Glover Park (41st St & Davis Pl NW)
- Via: Q Street NW
- End: Dupont Circle station (20th & Q Sts NW Entrance)
- Length: 20 minutes
- Other routes: D1

Service
- Level: Daily
- Frequency: 20-24 minutes (Daily); 40 minutes (Late nights)
- Operates: 6:30 AM - 12:50 AM
- Ridership: 417,438 (FY 2024)
- Transfers: SmarTrip only
- Timetable: Glover Park–Dupont Circle Line

The Glover Park–Dupont Circle Line, designated Route D2, was a daily bus route operated by the Washington Metropolitan Area Transit Authority between Glover Park and Dupont Circle station of the Red Line of the Washington Metro. The line operated every 20–24 minutes during the day and every 40 minutes during the evening. Route D2 trips were roughly 20 minutes long.

== Background ==
Route D2 operated daily between Glover Park and Dupont Circle station connecting Glover Park, Burleith, and Georgetown residents to Metrorail as there are no stations in Georgetown. Route D2 operated out of Western division. The line primarily uses 30 ft Orion VII BRTs since the line primarily uses small buses due to ridership and DC's Small Bus Program, but sometimes utilizes regular 40 ft buses from Western. During its times, the line would use Orion IIs and 30 ft Orion Vs prior to the 30 ft Orion VIIs.

== History ==
The Glover Park Line was originally operated under the Washington Railway & Electric Company prior to it merging with the Capital Traction Company in 1933. Route D1 originally began operating between Glover Park and Downtown under the Capital Street Company. The line at first were operated by streetcars, but then formed into buses on March 1, 1925. The line was later operated until DC Transit in 1956 and then acquired by WMATA on February 4, 1973.

On July 1, 1977, route D2 was extended to Stadium–Armory station when Blue Line service began operation. Route D2 would primarily operate along Q, E, K, and C Streets between Glover Park and Stadium–Armory. The line would operate as the Glover Park-Trinidad Line.

In 1995, route D2 was shorten to Dupont Circle station. Service to Stadium–Armory station was replaced by a rerouted route D6 which would operate along the former route D2 to Stadium–Armory. Additionally, a new route D1 was created to supplement route D2 during the weekday peak-hours to Washington Union Station. The line was then renamed to the Glover Park–Dupont Circle Line.

On December 19, 2010, route D2 was changed from a loop operation to two directional routes with terminals at Dupont Circle station and at Glover Park.

In 2019, WMATA proposed to combine routes D2 and G2 into one route. The new route would be named route G2 and would operate on the D2 and G2 routing between Glover Park and Howard University along Q and P streets. Service to Georgetown on route G2 would be discontinued. This was in order to consolidate all services operating between Dupont Circle and Wisconsin Avenue into one alignment on Q Street NW, which would allow customers to wait at Q Street bus stops for multiple services and to eliminate inefficiencies of operating services one block from each other on P and Q Streets NW.

The proposal was met with controversy with residents due to service being lacking in Georgetown if the proposal goes through. Resident didn't want the change to happen as they would have to walk to further bus stops or transfer to other buses instead of having a one seat ride to their destinations. WMATA later backed out of the proposal due to major customer opposition.

During the COVID-19 pandemic, Route D2 was reduced to operate on its Sunday schedule beginning on March 16, 2020. However on March 18, 2020, the route was further reduced to operate on its Sunday service. All weekend service was also suspended beginning on March 21, 2020. On June 28, 2020, route D2 service was reduced even further operating every 40 minutes only between 6:30 a.m. to 11:00 a.m. and 1:30 p.m. to 6:30 p.m. during the weekdays only. On August 23, 2020, additional service was added to the D2 but weekend service remained suspended.

In September 2020, WMATA proposed to eliminate all route D2 weekend service due to low federal funding. Later in February 2021 during WMATA's FY2022 budget crisis, WMATA proposed to restore Route D2 weekend service in the first half of the fiscal year between July 2021 and December 2021, but in the second half of the fiscal year between January and June 2022, WMATA proposed to eliminate the D2 and combine it with the M4 and N6. The new N6 will operate along the D2 routing between Glover Park and Dupont Circle station, then operate along the N6 routing inside Cathedral Heights, then operate on the M4 routing along Nebraska Avenue to Sibley Memorial Hospital. However, the D2 loop inside Glover Park would be eliminated. Subsequently on April 22, 2021, WMATA approved the FY2022 budget and received federal funding to avoid service cuts.

On March 14, 2021, route D2 weekend service was restored.

Due to rising cases of the COVID-19 Omicron variant, the line was reduced to its Saturday service on weekdays. Full weekday service resumed on February 7, 2022.

In 2024 during WMATA's FY2024 Budget crisis, WMATA proposed to eliminate all D2 service. However on April 25, 2024, Metro’s Board of Directors approved a $4.8 billion capital and operating budget which avoided service cuts.

=== Better Bus Redesign ===
In 2022, WMATA launched its Better Bus Redesign project, which aimed to redesign the entire Metrobus Network and is the first full redesign of the agency's bus network in its history.

In April 2023, WMATA launched its Draft Visionary Network. As part of the drafts, WMATA proposed to change the D2 completely, having the route be extended from Glover Park to Knollwood Retirement Home via New Mexico Avenue NW, and follow a modified Route M4 routing to Knollwood via Nebraska Avenue NW, Tenleytown–AU station, Utah Avenue NW, Western Avenue NW, Chestnut Street NW, and Oregon Avenue NW. The Glover Park loop would remain, but service would then be rerouted from Dupont Circle station to Foggy Bottom–GWU station via Benton Street NW, 37th Street NW, Reservoir Road NW, Foxhall Road NW, Q Street NW, MacArthur Boulevard NW, M Street NW, Pennsylvania Avenue NW, and 24th Street NW. The line would be named Route DC201. Service to Dupont Circle was proposed to be served by the proposed Route DC100, operating between Sibley Hospital and Washington Union Station via the current D6 routing between Sibley Hospital and Q Street NW (MacArthur Boulevard NW, Reservoir Road NW, and Q Street NW), then would operate along P Street NW and New Jersey Avenue NW to Union station.

During WMATA's Revised Draft Visionary Network, WMATA renamed the DC201 to Route C85 and was changed inside Glover Park to not serve the D2 Glover Park loop, and instead remain on Tunlaw Road NW, and operate along New Mexico Avenue NW, Idaho Avenue NW, 39th Street NW, and Massachusetts Avenue NW in Cathedral Heights. The remainder of the route would remain the same, with trips operating weekday between Knollwood and Tenleytown-AU station, and rush hour service extended to Foggy Bottom. Route DC100 was also kept and named Routes D92 and D94, being almost identical to current Routes G2 and D6.

Due to Glover Park opposition on the C85 not serving Dupont Circle station, WMATA created a new Route D96 that would operate similar to the D2. The new D96 is a combination of Routes D2, N2, N4, and N6 and would operate between Bethesda station and Dupont Circle station via Wisconsin Avenue, Friendship Heights station, Western Avenue, Massachusetts Avenue NW, Nebraska Avenue NW, New Mexico Avenue NW, Tunlaw Road, and the current D2 routing from 37th Street NW to Dupont Circle station. Weekday trips would be extended from Dupont Circle to Potomac Park via 19th Street NW, 18th Street NW, and Virginia Avenue NW. All changes were then proposed during WMATA's 2025 Proposed Network.

During the proposals, more Glover Park opposition caused WMATA to change both Routes C85 and D96. Both routes would now operate on the current Glover Park loop, giving Glover Park residents easier access to a bus. In addition, Route C85 was also changed to operate along Wisconsin Avenue NW and Cathedral Avenue NW to and from Tenleytown station, and operate on the Glover Park loop before resuming its proposed routing to Foggy Bottom. Also, the terminus at Knollwood Retirement Home was changed to terminate at Pinehurst Circle, with the proposed C83 being rerouted to serve Knollwood from Friendship Heights station. Route D96 was also changed, no longer operating along Nebraska Avenue NW, instead switching the routing with the C85, operating along Massachusetts Avenue NW, Cathedral Avenue NW, Idaho Avenue NW, and 39th Street NW to the Glover Park loop. The route would then operate on the proposed routing to Dupont Circle.

On November 21, 2024, WMATA approved its Better Bus Redesign Network.

Beginning on June 29, 2025, Route D2 was merged with the N4 and N6 and renamed into the D96. The new D96 operates between Bethesda station, Wisconsin Avenue, Friendship Heights station and Wesley Heights, then operates along New Mexico Avenue and on the former D2 route between Glover Park and Dupont Circle. Weekday service was then extended to Potomac Park. A new Route C85 was also created, operating between Pinehurst Circle and Foggy Bottom-GWU station via the Glover Park loop.
