= Massachusetts Avenue Line =

Daily bus route

D90, D96
- Massachusetts Avenue–Tenleytown Line; Massachusetts Avenue–Bethesda Line

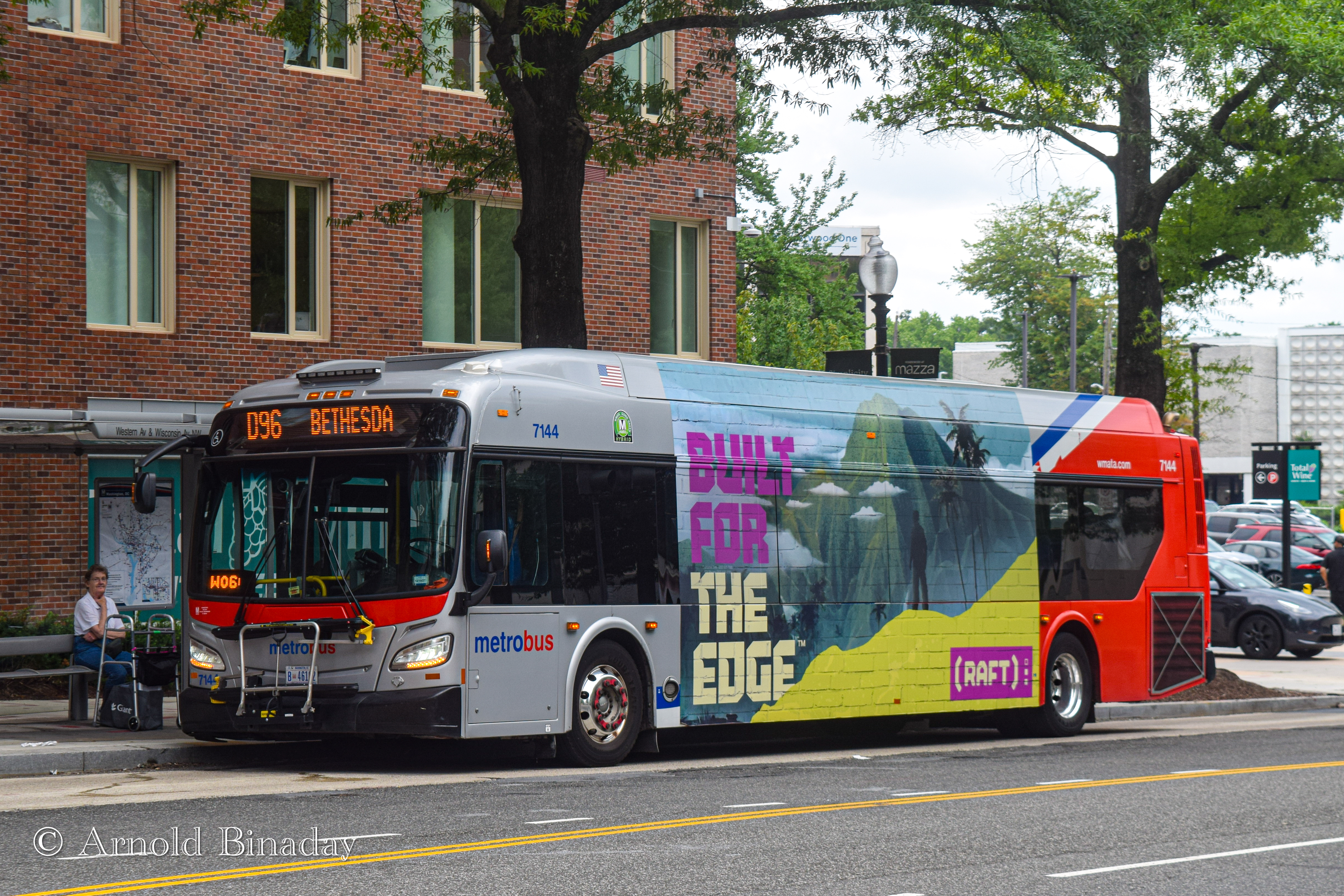
- Route D96 at Friendship Heights station

Overview
- System: Metrobus
- Operator: Washington Metropolitan Area Transit Authority
- Garage: Western
- Livery: Local
- Status: In Service
- Began service: 1908 as a streetcar route D90, D96: June 29, 2025
- Ended service: N2, N4, N6: June 28, 2025

Route
- Locale: Montgomery County, Northwest
- Communities served: Bethesda (D96), Chevy Chase (D96), Friendship Heights (D96), Tenleytown (D90), American University Park, Spring Valley (D96), Wesley Heights (D96), Glover Park (D96), Dupont Circle, Downtown, Mount Vernon Square (D90), Potomac Park (D96)
- Landmarks served: Bethesda station (D96), Friendship Heights station (D96), Tenleytown station (D90), American University, Ward Circle, Washington National Cathedral (D90), Embassy Row (D90), Dupont Circle station, Walter E. Washington Convention Center (D90)
- Start: D90: Tenleytown station D96: Bethesda station
- Via: Wisconsin Avenue (D96), Western Avenue (D96), Nebraska Avenue NW (D90), Massachusetts Avenue NW, New Mexico Avenue NW, Q Street NW (D96)
- End: D90: Mount Vernon Square; D96: Potomac Park (Weekdays); Dupont Circle (Weekends)

Service
- Level: Daily
- Frequency: 20-30 minutes (Weekdays); 30 minutes (Weekends)
- Operates: D90: 5:30 AM-12:00 AM (Weekdays); 7:00 AM-9:30 PM (Weekends); D96: 5:30 AM-12:00 AM (Weekdays); 7:00 AM-12:00 AM (Saturdays); 7:00 AM-11:00 PM (Sundays)
- Ridership: 333,869 (N2, FY 2025); 344,555 (N4, FY 2025); 150,757 (N6, FY 2025)
- Transfers: SmarTrip only
- Timetable: Massachusetts Avenue-Tenleytown Line; Massachusetts Avenue-Bethesda Line

The Massachusetts Avenue Line, designated as the Massachusetts Avenue–Tenleytown Line on Route D90, and Massachusetts Avenue–Bethesda Line on Route D96, are daily bus routes operated by the Washington Metropolitan Area Transit Authority, running primarily along Massachusetts Avenue in Washington DC. Route D90 operates between Tenleytown station of the Red Line of the Washington Metro, and Mount Vernon Square in Downtown Washington, DC. Route D96 operates between Bethesda station of the Red Line of the Washington Metro and Potomac Park on weekdays, with trips ending at Dupont Circle on weekends. Both routes operate every 20 minutes during rush hour, every 20-30 minutes weekday off-peak, and every 30 minutes at all other times. Route D90 trips take roughly 50 minutes while D96 trips take roughly 75 minutes. Routes D90 and D96 replaced former routes N2, N4, and N6 on June 29, 2025.

== Route description ==
Route D90 operates between Tenleytown station and Mount Vernon Square, providing service along Massachusetts Avenue, New Mexico Avenue, and Nebraska Avenue.

Route D96 operates between Bethesda station, and Potomac Park, with weekend service ending at Dupont Circle. The route operates along Wisconsin Avenue, Western Avenue, Massachusetts Avenue, New Mexico Avenue, and Q Street. The segment along Wisconsin Avenue between Bethesda and Friendship Heights stations replaces a now discontinued segment of the Ride On 34 route.

Both routes operate out of Western division.

== History ==
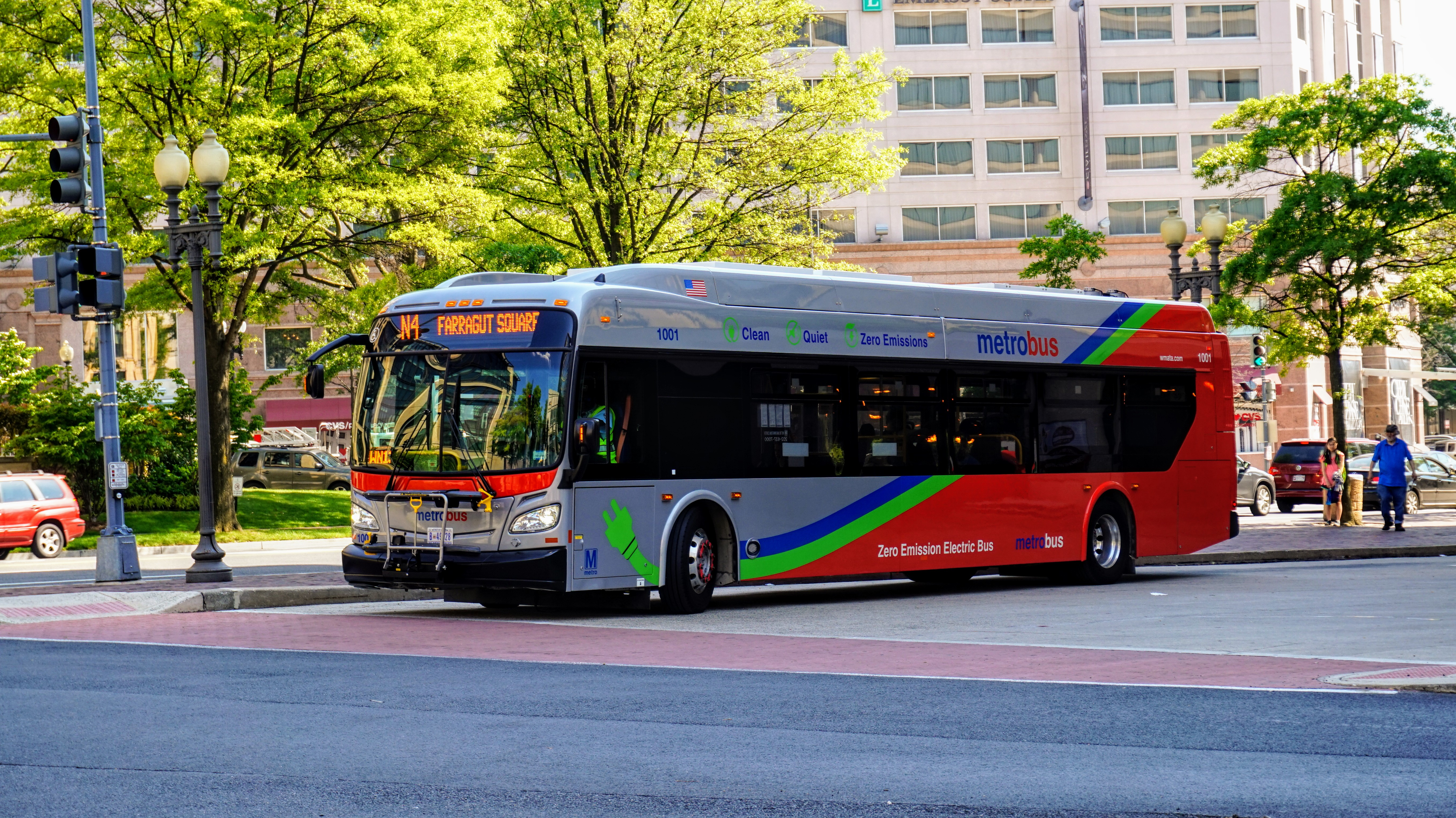
The former N4 at Friendship Heights station in 2017

The N2 and N4 originally began operating under streetcar lines by the Washington Railway & Electric Company in the 1900s. The route would operate between the Friendship Heights neighborhood to Downtown Washington D.C. Differences for the N2 and N4 was the N2 would operate in the Wesley Heights neighborhood along Nebraska Avenue, New Mexico Avenue, Cathedral Avenue, Idaho Avenue while the N4 remains along Massachusetts Avenue. The N2 and N4 later were formed into buses on May 13, 1925.

When the Capital Transit Company took over the Washington Railway & Electric Company, route N4 was rerouted to Glen Echo Park along the Maryland side of Massachusetts Avenue and Goldsboro Road.

The N4 routing to Glen Echo Park was later replaced by route N7 and Ride On route 29 when the N4 was shortened to terminate at Westmoreland Circle.

Route N1 and N3 were introduced to operate as the Massachusetts Avenue–Federal Triangle Line providing express service along Massachusetts Avenue going from Friendship Heights to Federal Triangle. But both routes were eliminated.

The Capital Transit Company was later acquired by DC Transit in 1956 which later formed into Metrobus on February 4, 1973.

On August 25, 1984, when Friendship Heights station opened, routes N1, N2, and N3 were rerouted to terminate at the newly opened station.

A new N6 was later introduced to operate alongside the N2 and N4 but run during the late nights and weekends as a combination to routes N2 and N4 operating in the Wesley Heights Neighborhood alongside the N2 in the clockwise direction (going westbound) but remaining along Massachusetts Avenue going eastbound.

In 1996, routes N1 and N3 were eliminated and replaced by route N4 which was extended from its terminus from Westmoreland Circle to Friendship Heights station along Western Avenue.

On December 29, 1996, route N6 was eliminated and replaced by routes N2 and N4 which added late night and weekend service at frequencies of every 24–32 minutes during weekday peak periods in the counterclockwise direction, every 36 minutes weekdays between approximately 9:30 AM and 3:30 PM, every 40 minutes weekday evenings after 7:30 PM, and every 50 minutes on Saturdays and Sundays.

In 1999, route N6 was reincarnated on its previous routing to replace the N2 and N4 during the late nights and weekends as both routes had low ridership during the post PM Peak hours and weekends. Route N6 would operate for the N2 and N4 as one route to fill the low demand the N2 and N4 had during the times the N6 will operate.

On June 25, 2000, route N2 was rerouted to operate along Wisconsin Avenue, Tenley Circle, and Nebraska Avenue instead of operating along Western Avenue as the route overlapped the N4. The reroute N2 would serve the Tenleytown neighborhood and Tenleytown–AU station plus give additional service for routes 30, 32, 34, 35, and 36 along Wisconsin Avenue and route M4 along portions of Nebraska Avenue. Service between Ward Circle and Cathedral and Massachusetts Avenues (to Farragut Square) plus Massachusetts and Idaho Avenues (to Friendship Heights) were unaffected.

A new route N3 was also introduced to operate during the weekday peak hours in the peak direction between Friendship Heights station and Federal Triangle via the N4 routing along Western Avenue and Massachusetts Avenue, but turn onto 20th Place and operate along 23rd Street, Virginia Avenue, Constitution Avenue, and 12th Street terminating along Pennsylvania Avenue and 10th Street during the AM Peak Hours and beginning on 12th Street and Constitution Avenue during the PM Peak Hours.

In 2010 during WMATA's FY2011 budget, WMATA proposed to eliminate the N3 as it overlaps other services and to only operate the N2 and N4 during the weekday peak hours. Route N6 would operate during the weekday midday hours with post PM peak hours and weekend service remaining unchanged. WMATA also proposed to reroute the N2 along Massachusetts Avenue, Westmoreland Circle, and Western Avenue from Ward Circle. Alternative service is provided by route M4 along Nebraska Avenue and Tenleytown station and routes 32 and 36 along Wisconsin Avenue.

On September 25, 2011, route N2 was rerouted along Massachusetts Avenue, Westmoreland Circle, and Western Avenue via the N3, N4, and N6 routing in order to replace portions of route N8 which was eliminated. Service to Tenleytown–AU station and the N2 portion along Nebraska Avenue was discontinued. Route N3 was also rerouted from the Friendship Heights bus bays to begin/end at Western Avenue and Jenifer Street due to Friendship Heights reaching its bus capacity. Passengers would have to walk a short distance to the Mazza Gallerie Metro station entrance as a result.

Many residents from Glover Park and Wesley Heights voiced frustration over the N2 reroute with residents losing direct access to Tenleytown–AU station. Brian Cohen, the chair of Advisory Neighborhood Commission 3B, told WMATA and DDOT representatives who attended a December 2011 meeting that as a public entity, metro's first obligation is to serve the public stated that "it is unacceptable to make these kinds of changes without public input."

WMATA Bus planner David Erion told residents that the change to the N2 line was not "significant enough" to meet the legal threshold requiring public input. But many residents called Erion's statement pathetic and that both WMATA and DDOT have total disdain for both Glover Park and Wesley Heights. DDOT's Steve Strauss told neighbors that in making the changes, both his agency and WMATA assumed the community "wanted to maintain the Spring Valley connection." Other Glover Park residents argued that the impacts of inclement weather and insufficient lighting make some of the streets no longer served by the N2 difficult and potentially dangerous. Other common complaints were that the buses will switch suddenly from the N2 to the N4 without any notice, suddenly instead of going to Cathedral Avenue, they are driven farther down Massachusetts Avenue.

The Advisory Neighborhood Commission passed a resolution asking DDOT and WMATA to restore the N2 route prior to the September 2011 changes Commissioners reasoned that the change was made so quickly in the first place that the agencies should be able to just switch them back. DDOT and WMATA said it would not be so easy. Julie Hershorn, a manager from WMATA's Office of Bus Planning, said one issue is that a change in the bus system can have a domino effect. If the buses are "inter-lining," it is possible that, for instance, when N2 bus reaches the end of its route, it could become another line entirely.

Due to the N2 reroute, Wesley Heights and Glover Park passengers wanting to go to Tenleytown would have to ride the N2 up to Ward Circle, then transfer to the infrequent M4 in order to reach Tenleytown. Passengers would then have to walk from the bus bays along Fort Drive and 40th Street to Wisconsin Avenue and catch the 32 or 36 to Friendship Heights to get off stops along Wisconsin Avenue. Or passengers were forced to ride the N2 all the way further to Friendship Heights station, then catch the 32, 36, or 37 buses for stops along Wisconsin Avenue and Tenleytown station. In all, passengers would need to transfer once or twice to reach their destinations. In response to the controversy, WMATA announced on December 9, 2011, that route N2 would be rerouted back along the former routing along Wisconsin Avenue, Tenley Circle, and Nebraska Avenue beginning on January 22, 2012. This gave Wesley Heights and Glover Park residents access to Tenleytown–AU station again.

In September 2015, WMATA proposed to eliminate all N3 service and replace it with the N4 due to low ridership and other services covering the route. Riders can ride the N4 up to 20th Street and transfer to the H1, L1 or S1 to Potomac Park/Foggy Bottom–GWU station and routes 30N, 30S, 32, 33, and 36 to Federal Triangle.

On June 26, 2016, route N3 was eliminated and replaced by route N4. Select weekday peak hour N4 trips in the weekday peak hour direction were extended to Potomac Park along H Street and 18th Street (to Friendship Heights), I Street, and 19th Street (to Potomac Park), and Virginia Avenue as well. Also routes N2, N4, and N6 terminus at Farragut Square were moved from the east side to the west side.

During the COVID-19 pandemic, routes N2 and N4 were suspended beginning on March 16, 2020 and route N6 operated on its Saturday supplemental schedule. However on March 18, 2020, further changes happened with route N6 operating on its Sunday schedule and weekend service being suspended beginning on March 21, 2020. A modified schedule and all weekend service resumed on August 23, 2020 with routes N2 and N4 remaining suspended.

On September 10, 2020, as part of WMATA's FY2022 budget, WMATA proposed to fully eliminate routes N2 and N4 and instead operate the N6 daily in order to simplify the line and having low federal funds. Later in February 2021, WMATA proposed to combine the N6 with the D2 and M4 if WMATA does not get any federal funding beginning in January 2022. The new N6 will operate along the D2 routing between Glover Park and Dupont Circle station, then operate along the N6 routing inside Cathedral Heights, then operate on the M4 routing along Nebraska Avenue to Sibley Memorial Hospital. Routes N2 and N4 would also be eliminated. Subsequently on April 22, 2021, WMATA approved the FY2022 budget and received federal funding to avoid service cuts.

On June 10, 2021, WMATA proposed to restore the N2 and N4 as part of WMATA's Pandemic Recovery Plan. However all N4 trips to Potomac Park would be eliminated.

On September 5, 2021, WMATA restored Routes N2 and N4 to their pre-pandemic schedule and reverted Route N6 to its weekday late-night schedule. However, N4 trips to Potomac Park were eliminated.

In 2024 during WMATA's FY2024 Budget crisis, WMATA proposed to eliminate all weekend N6 service. However on April 25, 2024, Metro’s Board of Directors approved a $4.8 billion capital and operating budget which avoided service cuts.

=== Better Bus Redesign ===
In 2022, WMATA launched its Better Bus Redesign project, which aimed to redesign the entire Metrobus Network and is the first full redesign of the agency's bus network in its history.

In April 2023, WMATA launched its Draft Visionary Network. As part of the drafts, WMATA proposed to modify the Massachusetts Avenue Line to operate between Tenleytown–AU station and Stadium–Armory station via Nebraksa Avenue NW, Massachusetts Avenue NW, East Capitol Street NE, Dupont Circle station, and Washington Union Station as Route DC202. Service inside Cathedral Heights along New Mexico Avenue NW, Cathedral Avenue NW, and Idaho Avenue NW would be served by the proposed Route DC201 between Knollwood Retirement Home in Barnaby Woods and Foggy Bottom–GWU station, and Route DC300, which would operate between Bethesda station and Duke Ellington Bridge.

During WMATA's Revised Draft Visionary Network, WMATA renamed the DC202 to Route D90 and modified it to terminate at Mount Vernon Square station/Walter E. Washington Convention Center. The proposed Route DC201 was renamed to Route C85 and was modified to not serve New Mexico Avenue NW or Cathedral Avenue NW, and Route DC300 was replaced by a new Route D96, which was created as a combination of the former Route D2, and Routes N4/N6. The proposed D96 would operate between Bethesda station and Potomac Park via Western Avenue, Friendship Heights station, Western Avenue NW, Massachusetts Avenue NW, Nebraska Avenue NW, New Mexico Avenue NW, Cathedral Avenue NW, Tunlaw Road NW, T Street NW, 35th Street NW, Q Street NW, Dupont Circle station, 19th Street NW, 18th Street NW, and Virginia Avenue NW. Weekend Route D96 trips would only operate between Bethesda and Dupont Circle stations. All changes were then proposed during WMATA's 2025 Proposed Network.

During the proposals, Route D90 was rerouted to serve Cathedral Heights via New Mexico Avenue NW, Cathedral Avenue NW, and Idaho Avenue NW. Route D96 would also no longer operate along Nebraska Avenue NW, and instead operate via Massachusetts Avenue NW, Idaho Avenue NW, Cathedral Avenue NW, New Mexico Avenue NW, through Cathedral Heights. Service would also operate along the former Route D2 routing in Glover Park via 39th Street NW, 41st Street NW, Calvert Street NW, and Benton Street NW before resuming its proposal routing to Dupont Circle.

On November 21, 2024, WMATA approved its Better Bus Redesign Network, with service on the Massachusetts Avenue Line being simplified.

Beginning on June 29, 2025, Route N2 was renamed to the D90 and was changed to operate between Tenleytown–AU station and Mount Vernon Square station, with service to Friendship Heights station and Farragut Square being eliminated. The N4 and N6 were combined with the D2 and renamed into the D96. The new D96 operates between Bethesda station, Wisconsin Avenue, Friendship Heights station, and Wesley Heights via the former N4 and N6 routing, then operates along New Mexico Avenue and on the former D2 route between Glover Park and Dupont Circle. Weekday service was then extended to Potomac Park.
