= Military Road Line =

Bus route in Washington, United States

C81
- Military Road Line

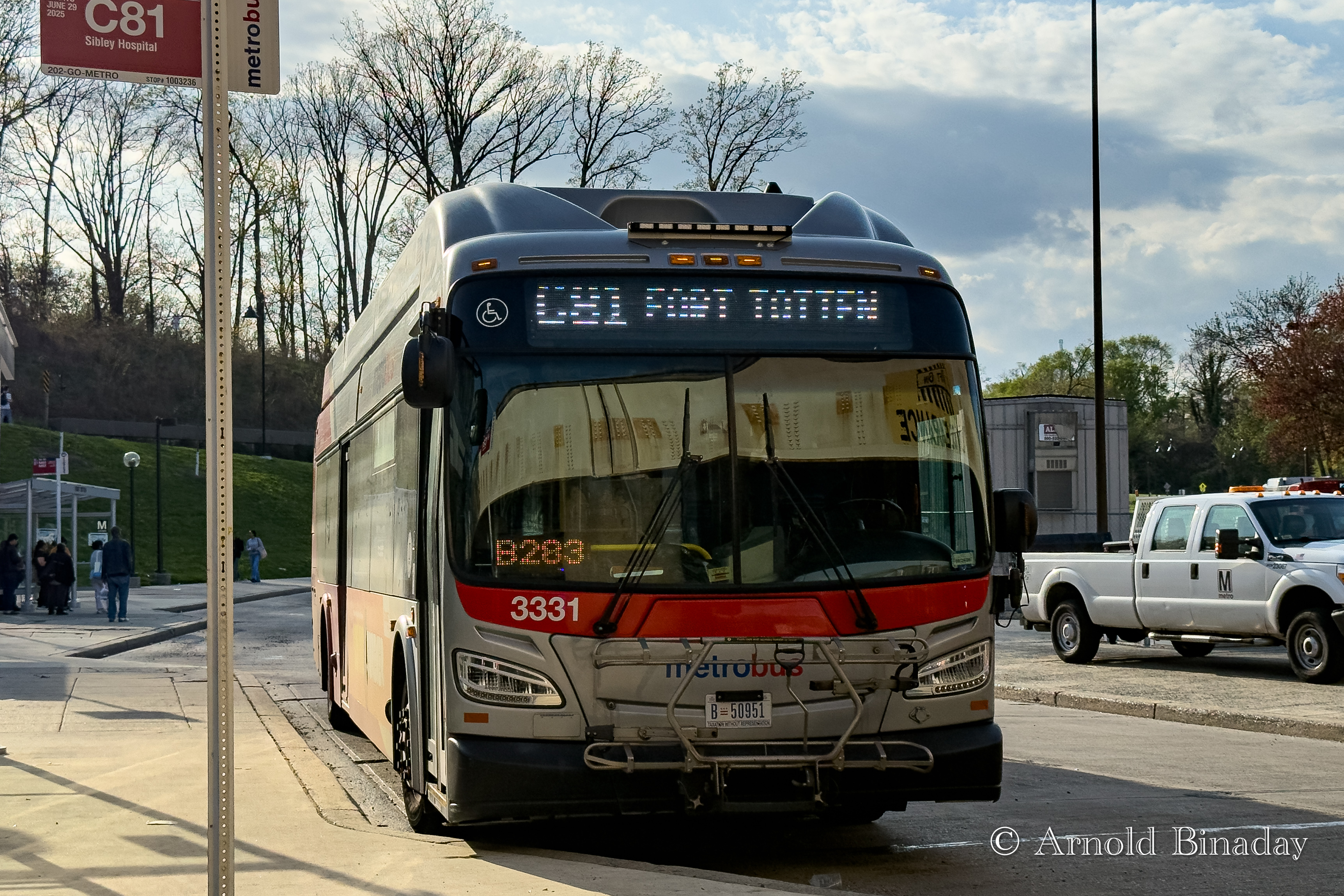
- Route C81 at Fort Totten station

Overview
- System: Metrobus
- Operator: Washington Metropolitan Area Transit Authority
- Garage: Bladensburg
- Livery: Local
- Status: Active
- Began service: 1970s
- Ended service: E4: June 29, 2025

Route
- Locale: Northwest, Northeast
- Communities served: The Palisades, Cathedral Heights, American University Park, Tenleytown, Chevy Chase, Sixteenth Street Heights, Brightwood Park, Fort Totten
- Landmarks served: Sibley Memorial Hospital, American University, Tenleytown station, Rock Creek Park, Fort Totten station
- Start: Sibley Memorial Hospital
- Via: Nebraska Avenue NW, Military Road NW, Kennedy Street NW, Missouri Avenue NW, Riggs Road NE
- End: Fort Totten station

Service
- Level: Daily
- Frequency: 20 - 30 minutes
- Operates: 5:00 AM - 12:00 AM
- Ridership: 1,105,812 (FY 2025)
- Transfers: SmarTrip only
- Timetable: Military Road Line

The Military Road Line, designated Route C81, is a daily bus route operated by the Washington Metropolitan Area Transit Authority between the Sibley Memorial Hospital and Fort Totten station of the Red, Green and Yellow Lines of the Washington Metro. The line runs every 20 minutes between 6 am and 9 pm and 30 minutes after 9 pm. Trips takes roughly 45 minutes.

== Background ==
Route C81 operates daily between Sibley Memorial Hospital and Fort Totten station daily. This line mainly connects Northwest and Northeast by bus without having to ride the train and provides service along Nebraska Avenue NW, Military Road NW, and Kennedy Street NW. Route C81 operates out of Bladensburg division.

=== Former Route E4 Stops ===
Bus stop	Direction	Connections
Montgomery County, Maryland
Friendship Heights Bus Bay J	Eastbound station, Westbound terminal	Metrobus: 31, 33, L8, N2, N4, N6, T2; Ride On: 1, 11, 23, 29, 34; Friendship Heights Village Bus; Washington Metro:
Western Avenue / Livingston Street NW	Bidirectional	Metrobus: L8; Ride On: 1, 11
Western Avenue / 41st Street NW	Eastbound	Metrobus: L8; Ride On: 1, 11
Washington, D.C.
McKinley Street NW / Western Avenue	Westbound	Metrobus: L8; Ride On: 1, 11
McKinley Street NW / 39th Street NW	Bidirectional	
McKinley Street NW / Connecticut Avenue	Bidirectional	Metrobus: L2
McKinley Street NW / Chevy Chase Parkway NW	Bidirectional	
McKinley Street NW / Nevada Avenue NW	Bidirectional	
McKinley Street NW / Broad Branch Road NW	Bidirectional	
McKinley Street NW / 33rd Street NW	Bidirectional	
McKinley Street NW / 32nd Street NW	Bidirectional	
30th Place NW / Nebraska Avenue NW	Bidirectional	Metrobus: M4
30th Place NW / Legation Street NW	Bidirectional	Metrobus: M4
30th Place NW / Military Road NW	Bidirectional	Metrobus: M4
Military Road NW/ 30th Street NW	Westbound	Metrobus: D31, D33, D34, W45
Military Road NW / 29th Street NW	Eastbound	Metrobus: D31, D33, D34, W45
Military Road NW / 28th Street NW	Westbound	Metrobus: D31, D33, D34, W45
Military Road / 27th Street NW	Bidirectional	Metrobus: D31, D33, D34, W45
Military Road NW / Glover Road NW	Eastbound	Metrobus: D31, D33, D34, W45
Military Road NW / Oregon Avenue NW	Westbound	Metrobus: D31, D33, D34, W45
Military Road NW / 16th Street NW	Westbound	Metrobus: D31, D33, D34, S2, S9, W45
Missouri Avenue NW / 16th Street NW	Eastbound	Metrobus: D31, D33, D34, S2, S9, W45
14th Street NW / Missouri Avenue NW	Westbound	Metrobus: 52, 54, 59, D34, W45
14th Street NW / Oglethorpe Street NW	Eastbound	Metrobus: 52, 54, 59, D34, W45
14th Street NW / Nicholson Street NW	Bidirectional	Metrobus: 52, 54, D34, W45
14th Street NW / Montague Street NW	Bidirectional	Metrobus: 52, 54, D34, W45
14th Street NW / Longfellow Street NW	Bidirectional	Metrobus: 52, 54, D34, W45
Kennedy Street NW / Colorado Avenue NW	Westbound	Metrobus: 52, 54, 59, D34, W45
Kennedy Street NW / 14th Street NW	Eastbound	Metrobus: 52, 54, 59, D34, W45
Kennedy Street NW / 13th Street NW	Bidirectional	
Kennedy Street NW / Georgia Avenue	Bidirectional	Metrobus: 70, 79
Kennedy Street NW / 9th Street NW	Bidirectional	
Kennedy Street NW / 8th Street NW	Bidirectional	
Kennedy Street NW / 7th Street NW	Bidirectional	
Kennedy Street NW / 5th Street NW	Bidirectional	Metrobus: 62, 63
Kennedy Street / 4th Street NW	Bidirectional	
Kennedy Street NW / 3rd Street NW	Eastbound	
3rd Street NW / Kennedy Street NW	Westbound	
Missouri Avenue NW / 2nd Street NW	Bidirectional	
Missouri Avenue NW / New Hampshire Avenue NW	Bidirectional	Metrobus: 64
Riggs Road NE / North Capitol Street	Bidirectional	Metrobus: 60, 64, K2, K6
Riggs Road NE / Blair Road NE	Westbound	Metrobus: 60, 64, K2, K6
Riggs Road NE / Rock Creek Church Road NE	Eastbound	Metrobus: 60, 64, K2, K6
First place NE / Riggs Road NE	Westbound	Metrobus: 60, 64, K2, K6, R1, R2
First place NE / Ingraham Street NE	Eastbound	Metrobus: 60, 64, K2, K6, R1, R2
Fort Totten Bus Bays E and K	Bidirectional	Metrobus: 60, 64, 80, E2, F6, K2, K6, K9, R1, R2; Washington Metro:
Galloway Street NE / 4th Street NE	Eastbound	Metrobus: 80 (Southbound only), E2 (Southbound only), F6 (Eastbound only)
South Dakota Avenue NE / Kennedy Street NE	Eastbound	
Riggs Road NE / South Dakota Avenue NE	Bidirectional	Metrobus: R1, R2
Riggs Road NE / Chillum Place NE	Bidirectional	Metrobus: K9, R1, R2
Chillum Place NE / Kennedy Street NE	Eastbound	
Chillum Place NE / #5312	Eastbound	
Chillum Place NE / 11th Street NE	Eastbound	
Chillum Place NE / Eastern Avenue	Eastbound	
Eastern Avenue / Jamaica Street NE Riggs Park	Westbound station, Eastbound terminal	
Nicholson Street NE / 8th Street NE	Westbound	
Nicholson Street NE / 6th Street NE	Westbound	
Nicholson Street NE / Riggs Road NE	Westbound	Metrobus: R1, R2
Riggs Road NE / Nicholson Street NE	Westbound	Metrobus: R1 (Southbound only), R2 (Southbound only)

== History ==
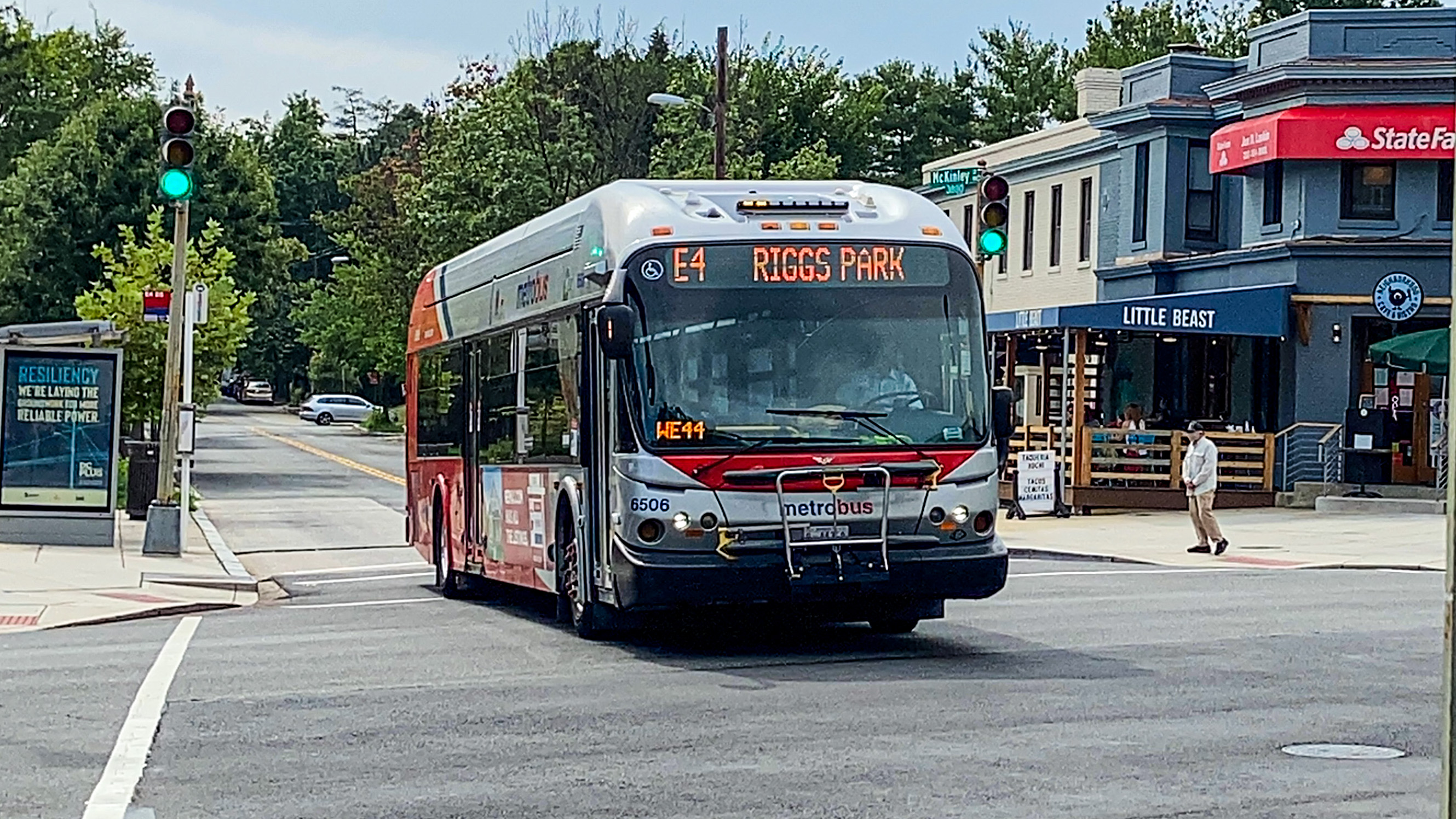
Former Route E4 in Chevy Chase

Route E2, E3, E4, E5, and E8 all operated as part of the Military Road–Crosstown Line through the years starting from Friendship Heights station. Route E4 originally operated up to University City Apartments in Lewisdale, Maryland but was shorten to Riggs Park in the 1970s. Routes E2, E3, and E4 terminated at Friendship Heights while E5 and E8 were shorten to Friendship Heights in 1984.

During the years, the E5 and E8 were discontinued and route E6 operated as part of the Chevy Chase Line. Prior to 2015, route E2 would operate between Friendship Heights station and Ivy City (Okie & 16th Streets NE), route E4 would operate between Friendship Heights and Riggs Park (Eastern Ave & Jamaica St NE) during the weekday peak hours only, and route E3 would operate on midday and weekends only between Friendship Heights and Ivy City via Riggs Park as a combination to route E2 and E4. During most hours of the day, route E2 would operate between Friendship Heights and Fort Totten station only and only serves Ivy City during the weekday peak hours, and early morning and late night periods through the week.

Beginning on September 24, 2006, route E3 midday service was eliminated and replaced by full route E2 and route E4. Route E4 and the full route E2 now operated during all days during the weekdays while the E3 only operated during the weekends. Route E2 kept its short trips between Friendship Heights and Fort Totten which only operated during times when the E3 did operate.

In 2012, WMATA proposed to eliminate routes E3 and E4 and shorten route E2 between Friendship Heights station and Fort Totten station. Service between Fort Totten and Riggs Park/Ivy City would be replaced by an extended route D4 and F6 reroute. According to WMATA, this was to reduce running time and improve on-time performance, provide a level of service along the different portions of the line east and west of Fort Totten commensurate with the significantly different passenger demand on the two portions, and allow for a more even frequency of service on the western portion of the line where the greatest demand occurs.

In 2014, WMATA proposed to split the E2 and E4 into two separate routes. Route E4 will keep its current routing to Riggs Park with short trips operate between Friendship Heights station and Fort Totten station while route E2 will operate its current routing between Fort Totten and Ivy City. This will improve reliability of service by operating shorter routes and create a better balance of capacity and demand throughout the line. It will be every 16–20 minutes for all three routes during a.m. and p.m. peak periods, and every 36–40 minutes for all three routes off-peak and weekends and will have timed transfers at Fort Totten to minimize wait time.

On June 21, 2015, route E2 and E4 were split into two different bus lines. Route E4 kept the Military Road–Crosstown Line name while route E2 was renamed into the Ivy City–Fort Totten Line also being shorten between Fort Totten station and Ivy City on its current routing. Route E4 was also given weekend service fully replacing route E3 as well. A small section of route E3's routing along Sargent Road and Eastern Avenue wasn't replaced as stops along the route are in walking distance to routes E2 and E4 bus stops.

Route E4 will have frequencies between Friendship Heights and Fort Totten every 8–10 minutes during AM and PM peak periods and every 18–20 minutes off-peak and weekends.

During the COVID-19 pandemic, the route was reduced to operate on its Saturday supplemental schedule during the weekdays beginning on March 16, 2020. On March 18, 2020, the line was further reduced to operate on its Sunday schedule. Weekend service was later suspended on March 21, 2020. Additional service and weekend service was restored on August 23, 2020.

On June 10, 2021, WMATA proposed to increase the E4 to operate every 20 minutes daily between 7:00 AM to 9:00 PM daily as part of WMATA's Pandemic Recovery Plan.

On September 5, 2021, service was increased to operate every 20 minutes daily between Friendship Heights and Fort Totten station.

Due to rising cases of the COVID-19 Omicron variant, the line was reduced to its Saturday service on weekdays. Full weekday service resumed on February 7, 2022.

=== Better Bus Redesign ===
In 2022, WMATA launched its Better Bus Redesign project, which aimed to redesign the entire Metrobus Network and is the first full redesign of the agency's bus network in its history.

In April 2023, WMATA launched its Draft Visionary Network. As part of the drafts, WMATA proposed modifying the Military Road Line into two routes. The first proposed route was named Route DC200 and was to operate between Fort Totten station and Sibley Memorial Hospital, following the current Route E4 routing between Fort Totten station and the intersection of Military Road NW & 30th Street NW, then would follow the current Route M4 routing to Sibley Hospital via Military Road NW, Nebraska Avenue NW, Loughboro Road NW, MacArthur Boulevard NW, and Arizona Avenue NW. Another route proposed was Route DC203 and would operate between Fort Totten station and Friendship Heights station, operating closely to the current E4 via Riggs Road NE, Missouri Avenue NW, and Military Road NW. Service to Riggs Park was partially taken over by Route DC209, which is proposed to operate between West Hyattsville station and Ivy City via Riggs Park. Service along Western Avenue NW, McKinley Street NW, and 30th Place NW would be discontinued in this proposal.

During WMATA's Revised Draft Visionary Network, WMATA retained the DC200 and DC203 and renamed them to Routes C81 and C83 respectively. The C81 would remain the same from the draft proposal, but Route C83 would be changed to operate alongside the C81 and almost match the current E4, operating along Riggs Road NE, Missouri Avenue NW, Kennedy Street NW, 14th Street NW, Military Road NW, Connecticut Avenue NW, McKinley Street NW, and Western Avenue NW, partially restoring service on McKinley Street NW. Route C83 would only operate during the weekdays. Route DC209 was not included in the revised proposal, with Riggs Park service instead taken over by Route P32 between Fort Totten station and College Park–University of Maryland station. All changes were then proposed during WMATA's 2025 Proposed Network.

During the proposals, Route C83 was changed again to operate between Friendship Heights station and Barnaby Woods via Western Avenue NW, McKinley Street NW, Nevada Avenue NW, Nebraska Avenue NW, Utah Avenue NW, and Oregon Avenue NW, almost replicating the former Route E6. Route C81 was also changed to operate every 20 minutes daily, and have the route operate on South Dakota Avenue NE and Galloway Street NE before and after serving Fort Totten station. Service to Riggs Park was also instead served by the proposed Route C71, which operates between Fort Totten station and Washington Union Station via Riggs Park and Ivy City.

On November 21, 2024, WMATA approved its Better Bus Redesign Network.

Beginning on June 29, 2025, Route E4 was split into two routes. The portion between Fort Totten station and the intersection of Military Road NW & 30th Place NW was renamed into the C81 and remained mostly the same, but was then combined with the former M4 and rerouted to continue straight along Military Road NW, then turn onto Nebraska Avenue NW and operate to Sibley Hospital (skipping Tenleytown–AU station) via Nebraska Avenue NW, Loughboro Road NW, MacArthur Boulevard NW, and Arizona Avenue NW. Service to Riggs Park was replaced by Route E2 (renamed to the C71), which partially reincarnates the former Route E3. The E4 portion between Friendship Heights station and Military Road NW via McKinley Street NW was renamed to the C83 and was rerouted to serve Barnaby Woods via Nevada Avenue NW and Nebraska Avenue NW, then operate in a loop via Utah Avenue NW, Western Avenue, Oregon Avenue NW, and back on Nevada Avenue NW, partially reincarnating the former Route E6 service. C83 service to Knollwood Retirement Home was originally not serviced in the proposal, but began serving it sometime in Summer 2025.

On June 21, 2026, Route C81 service was rerouted between Nebraska Avenue and Tenley Circle, operating along 40th Street NW, Fort Drive NW, and Chesapeake Street NW to directly serve Tenleytown–AU station.

== Incidents ==
- On January 30, 2015, a 14-year-old boy attacked an E4 bus driver with a stun gun striking the driver's right arm. The teen was arrested on April 21, 2015 and charged with assault with a dangerous weapon.
