= Barnaby Woods =

Barnaby Woods, Washington, D.C.
- Neighborhood
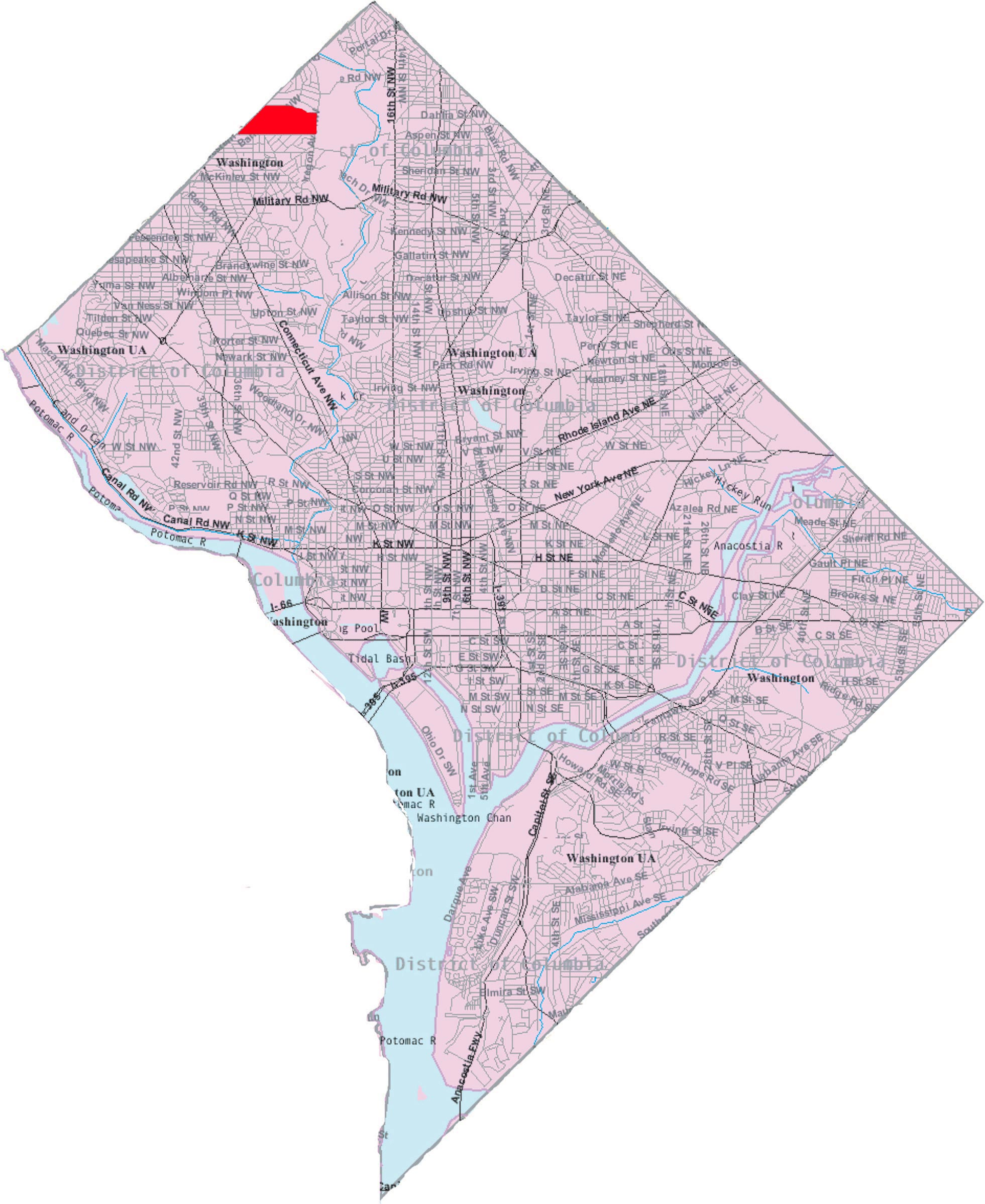
- Map of Washington, D.C., with Barnaby Woods highlighted in red
- Coordinates: 38.9744°N 77.0597°W
- Country: United States
- District: Washington, D.C.
- Ward: Ward 4

Government
  - Councilmember: Janeese Lewis George
- Postal code: ZIP code

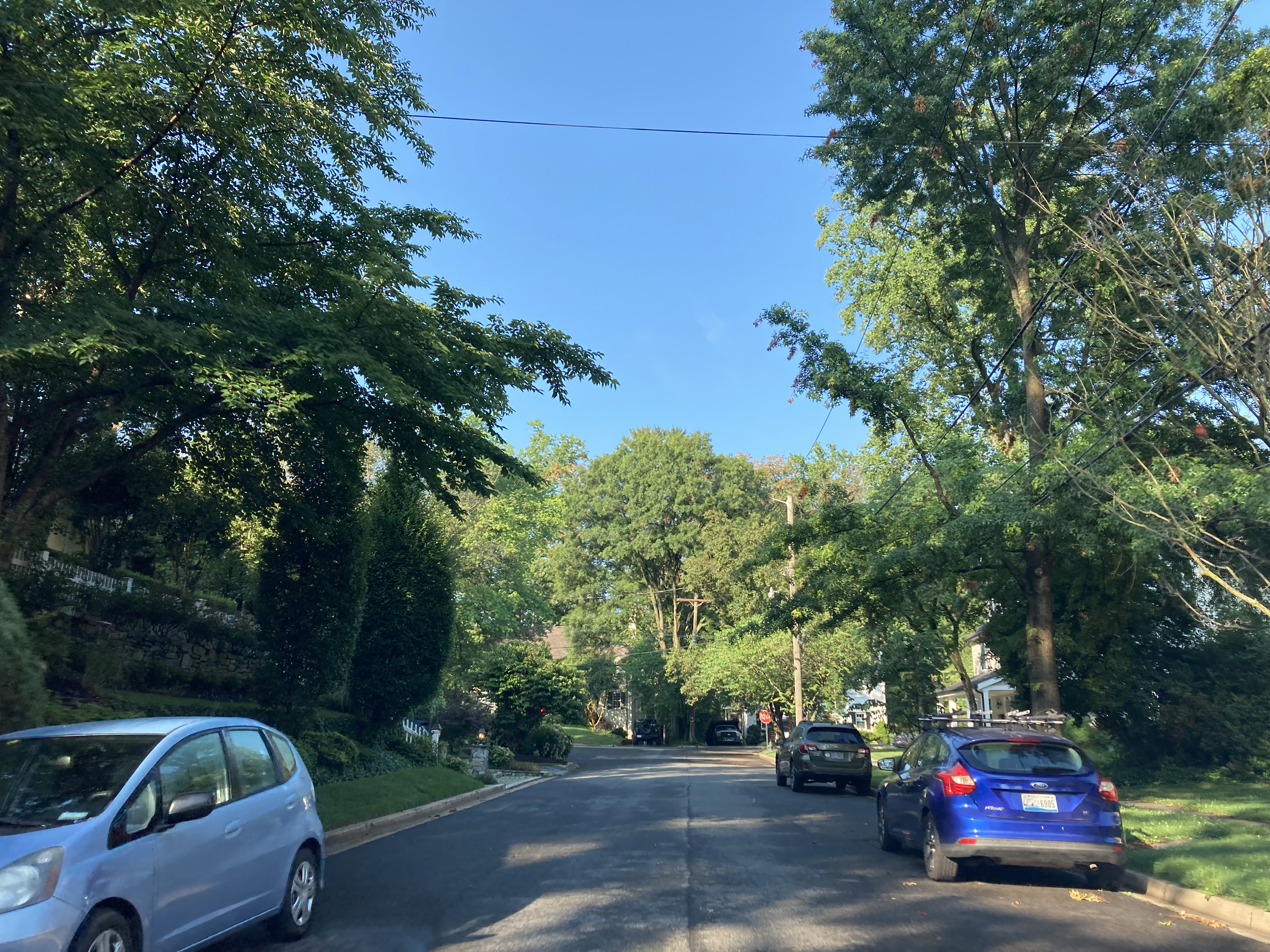
Near the intersection of 32nd Pl. and Worthington St. NW, in Barnaby Woods, in July 2021.

Barnaby Woods is a neighborhood in the Northwest quadrant of Washington, D.C., wedged between Rock Creek Park and Montgomery County, Maryland. It is bounded on the north by Aberfoyle Place, on the west by Western Avenue, on the south by Tennyson Street, and on the east by Oregon Avenue. Barnaby Woods is entirely residential, with no commercial zoning whatsoever, and the housing consists primarily of 1930s colonial homes on large parcels of land although on Unicorn Lane NW there are only townhouses.

Barnaby Woods is in the 2nd Police district and is within Police Service Area (PSA) 201. Barnaby Woods residents are within the sending districts of Lafayette Elementary School, Deal Middle School and Jackson-Reed High School.

== History ==
On November 4, 1934, Edward R. Carr headed up the Barnaby Woods Development Company, formed to develop the 23-acre tract in Chevy Chase, DC. Claude G. Johnson and M. B. Swanson are also credited with the promotion and realization of this community. Thomas C. Jeffers, engineer and landscape architect of the National Capital Park & Planning Commission, was employed to lay out the subdivision.

A Post article read: Barnaby Woods, with its shady paths, running brooks and flowery shrubbery offers a country home atmosphere with all the advantages of a location in the district. Just west of the Pinehurst Branch of Rock Creek Park, the comprehensive landscaping plan saved the original beauty of the project's location.

On June 1, 1935, the first group of five houses were completed. Post real estate ads showed several Barnaby Street properties selling between $11,900 to $12,900. Later in November 1935, two Van Hazen St. properties, built under the supervision of well-known DC residential developer, C.R. Matheny, came on the market.

By spring 1937, 70 homes had been constructed, with 62 already sold. "Careful architectural and social restrictions guarantee each home buyer in this community a sound investment".
