= Wisconsin Avenue =

Thoroughfare in Washington, D.C. and its suburbs

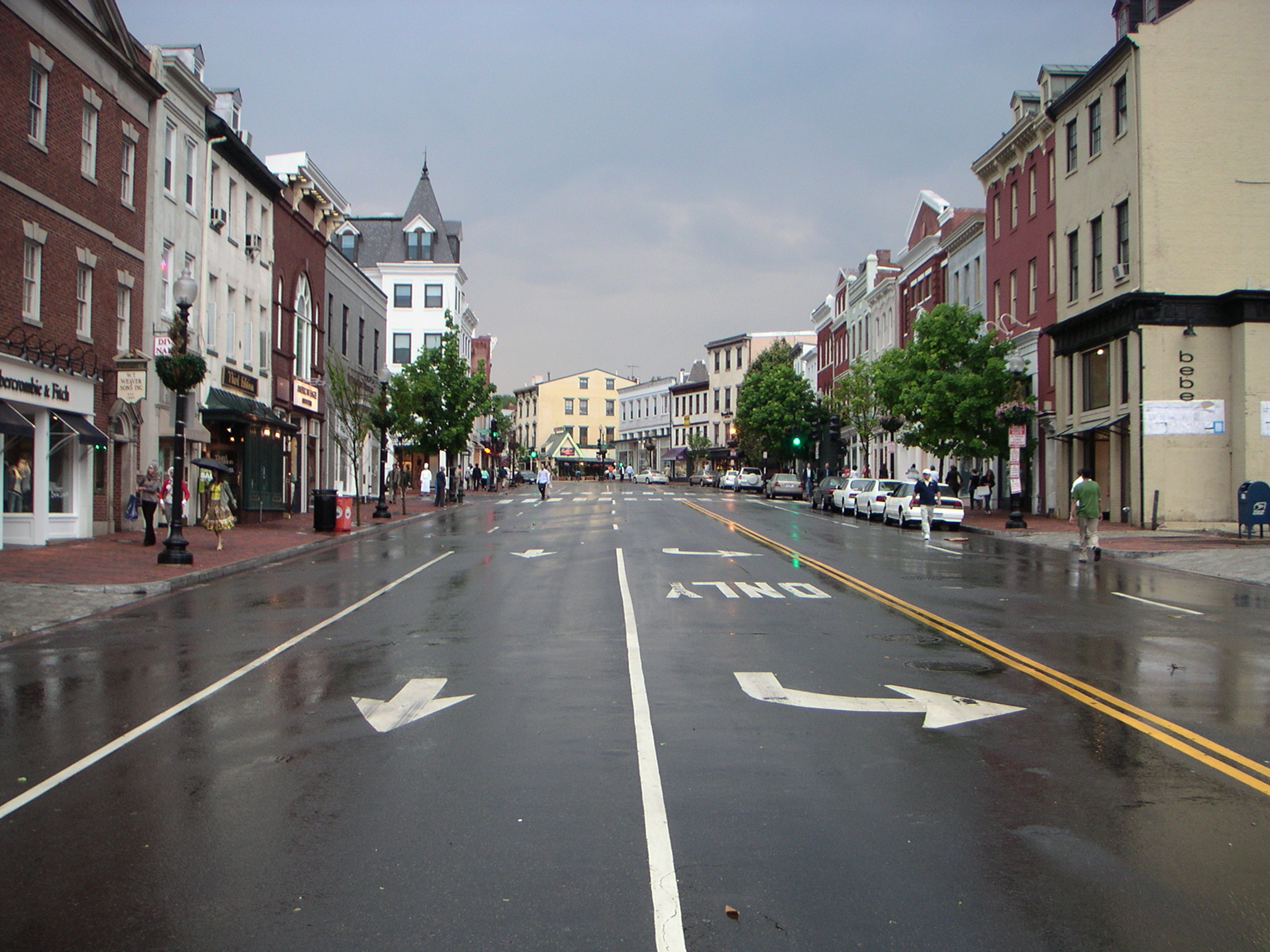
Shops at Wisconsin Avenue and M Street N.W. in the Georgetown neighborhood of Washington, D.C.

Wisconsin Avenue is a major thoroughfare in the Washington metropolitan area. The southern terminus begins in Georgetown just north of the Potomac River, at an intersection with K Street under the elevated Whitehurst Freeway. Wisconsin Avenue ends just north of Bethesda, Maryland—though the road designated as Maryland Route 355 continues north for miles under the name of Rockville Pike.

== Route ==
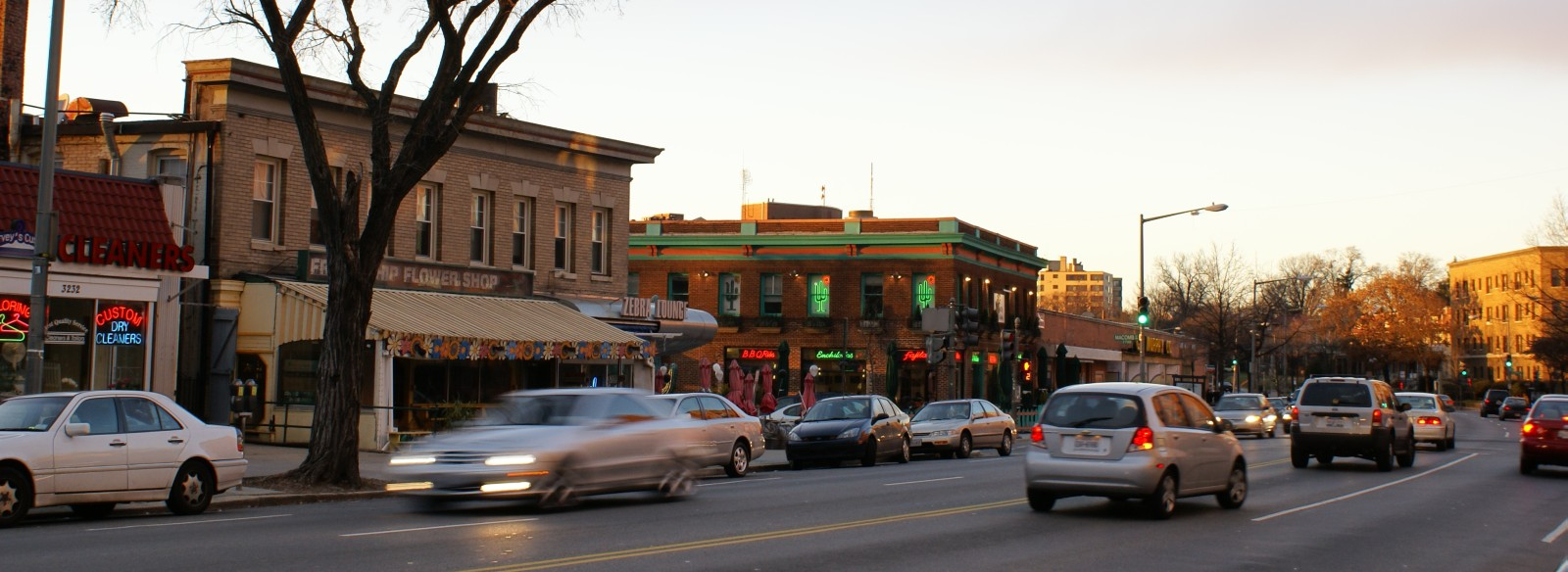
Wisconsin Avenue in Cathedral Heights

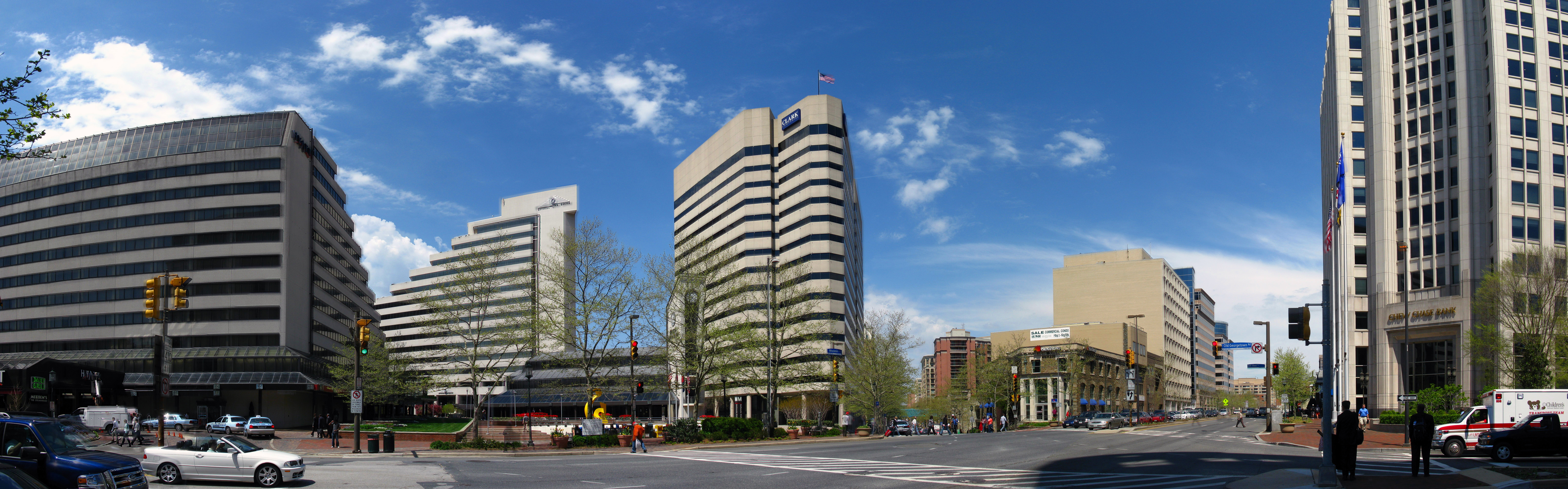
The commercial corridor along Wisconsin Avenue, also known as Maryland Route 355, in Bethesda, Maryland

From the Georgetown riverfront on the Potomac River, Wisconsin Avenue climbs steeply north through Northwest Washington, D.C., along two travel lanes, with parked vehicles generally filling both curb lanes. The road passes through the neighborhoods of Glover Park, Cathedral Heights next to the Washington National Cathedral, Cleveland Park, Tenleytown, and Friendship Heights with its several broadcasting towers.

In Friendship Heights, Wisconsin Avenue intersects with Western Avenue, which forms much of the northwest border of Washington, D.C., and then crosses into Montgomery County, Maryland. In Maryland, the road is also known as Maryland Route 355. As Wisconsin Avenue passes through Bethesda, it forms one of the main streets of downtown Bethesda.

Just north of downtown Bethesda, at the intersection with Glenbrook Parkway, the avenue's name changes to Rockville Pike and continues north.

== Transportation ==
From the Tenleytown-AU station north, Wisconsin Avenue runs approximately parallel to the Red Line of the Washington Metro.

=== Transit service ===
==== Metrorail ====
Metrorail stations on or near Wisconsin Avenue are all served by the Red Line. They include:

- Tenleytown-AU
- Friendship Heights
- Bethesda

==== Metrobus ====
The following Metrobus routes travel along the street (listed from south to north):

- 31, 33 (Friendship Heights Station to M St. NW)
- 37 (Limited stop service from Friendship Heights Station to Massachusetts Ave.)
- 96 (Woodley Rd. NW to Tenleytown-AU Station)
- H3, H4 (Porter St. NW to Tentleytown-AU Station)
- H2 (Van Ness St. NW to Tenleytown-AU Station)
- N2 (Friendship Heights Station to Nebraska Ave. NW)
- L2 (Friendship Heights Station to Bethesda Station (late night Friday & Saturday only))

==== Ride On ====
The following Ride On routes travel along the street (listed from south to north):

- 34 (Cedar Lane to Woodmont Ave., and later Bethesda station to Friendship Heights station)

== Place in the National Highway System ==
Once designated U.S. Highway 240, Wisconsin Avenue remains part of the National Highway System as an arterial route from M Street to the Capital Beltway.

== History ==
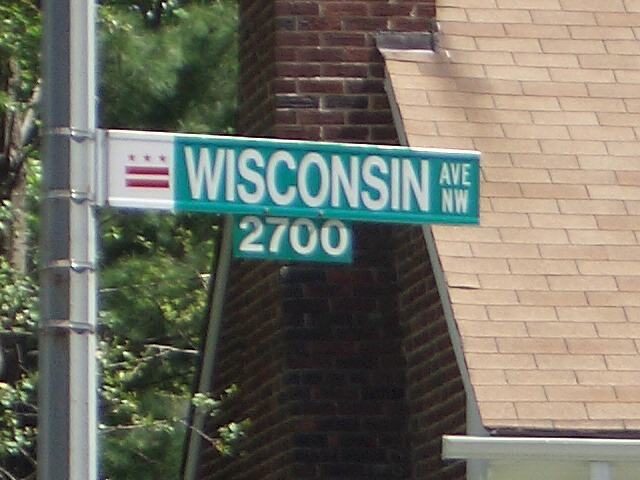
A Wisconsin Avenue street sign

Wisconsin Avenue follows the route of an ancient Native American trail. It was used by Europeans since the 1690s. Between 1805 and 1820, it was turned into a toll road by the Georgetown and Rockville Turnpike Company to carry tobacco and other products between Georgetown and Frederick.

The section of Wisconsin Avenue in Georgetown was called High Street before the street names in Georgetown were changed in 1895 to conform to those of the L'Enfant Plan for the federal city (although Georgetown predates the planned capital by half a century).

In 1864, General Jubal A. Early marched down this road from Monocacy Junction in an attempt to take Washington, D.C., that ended in the Battle of Fort Stevens.

For more than half a century, Wisconsin was host to various streetcar lines, starting in the late 18th century near the Georgetown waterfront and reaching the intersection with Old Georgetown Road in Bethesda in the early 20th century. A route from M Street to a loop at Friendship Heights was still running when the District's streetcar system shut down in 1962.

Starting around 1920, various sections of the road have been paved and widened to two, four, and six lanes.
