= Tenleytown–AU station =

Washington Metro station

Tenleytown–AU
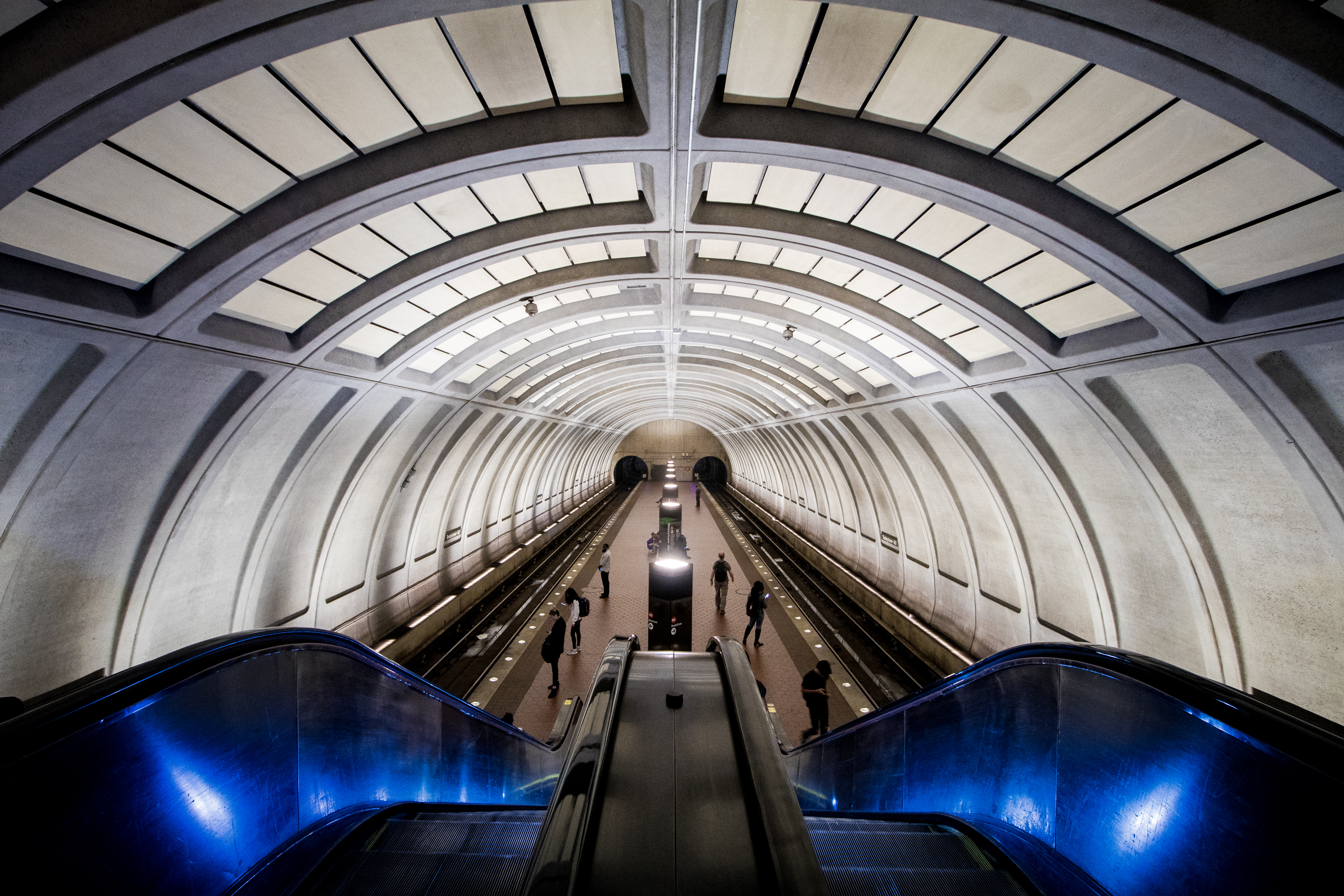
- Tenleytown–AU station platform in September 2019

General information
- Location: 4501 Wisconsin Avenue NW; Washington, D.C.
- Coordinates: 38°56′53.1″N 77°4′45.9″W
- Owner: Washington Metropolitan Area Transit Authority
- Platforms: 1 island platform
- Tracks: 2
- Connections: Metrobus: C51, C61, C81, C85, C87, D80, D82, D90; American University Shuttle

Construction
- Structure type: Underground
- Parking: 17 spaces (parking meters)
- Cycle facilities: Capital Bikeshare, 20 racks and 20 lockers
- Accessible: Yes

Other information
- Station code: A07

History
- Opened: August 25, 1984; 42 years ago
- Former names: Tenley Circle; Tenleytown

Passengers
- 2025: 4,768 (average weekday)
- Rank: 34 of 98

Services
Preceding station	Washington Metro	Following station
Friendship Heights toward Shady Grove	Red Line	Van Ness–UDC toward Glenmont
Route map
Location

Tenleytown–AU station is a subway station on the Red Line of the Washington Metro in Washington, D.C. Located in the Upper Northwest neighborhood, it is the last station on the Red Line heading outbound wholly within the District of Columbia; the next stop, Friendship Heights, lies within both the District and the state of Maryland. The station serves American University (AU). It opened as Tenleytown on August 25, 1984.

== Location ==
The southernmost station underneath the Wisconsin Avenue NW corridor, Tenleytown–AU station lies within the neighborhood of the same name in the Upper Northwest portion of the city. It lies north of Tenley Circle, below Wisconsin Avenue NW at its intersection with Albemarle Street NW. In addition, Fort Reno Park and the Washington National Cathedral are located close to the station.

== History ==
Originally to be called Tenley Circle, in February 1980 the Metro Board officially changed its name to Tenleytown. The station opened on August 25, 1984. Its opening coincided with the completion of 6.8 miles (10.9 km) of rail northwest of the Van Ness–UDC station and the opening of the Bethesda, Friendship Heights, Grosvenor and Medical Center stations. In May 1989, although objected to by several community groups, the Metro Board officially changed its name to Tenleytown–AU due to its proximity to American University. The $63,500 cost of changing the names on signs, pylons and maps throughout the system was paid for by the District government.

== Station layout ==
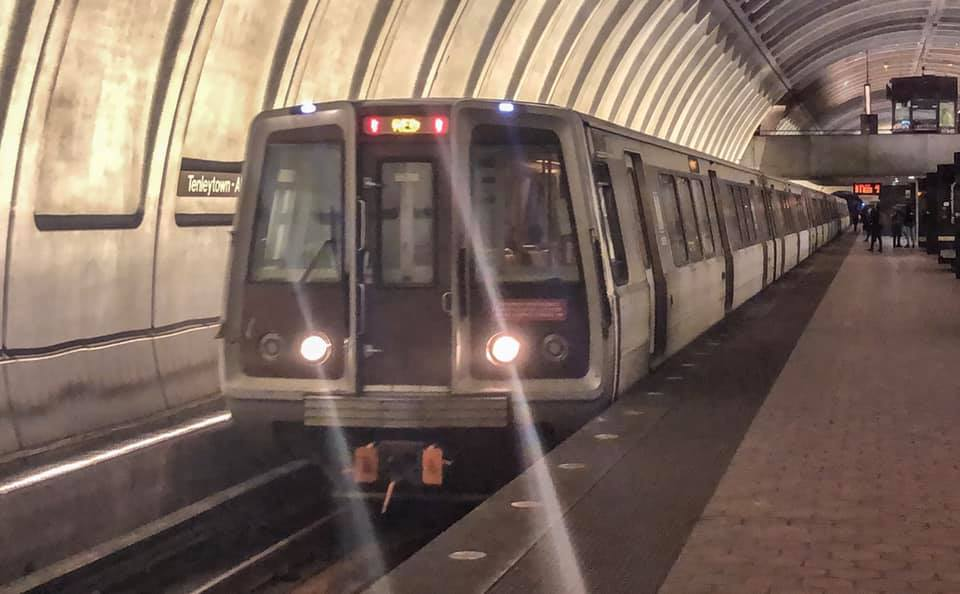
Glenmont-bound Red Line train arriving at Tenleytown–AU in February 2019

This station uses the four-coffer arch design found at most underground stations on the western side of the Red Line. It is one of 11 stations constructed using rock-tunneling methods, lying more than 100 feet (30 m) below the surface.

Two entrances on either side of Wisconsin Avenue meet at an upper mezzanine, converging into a set of three long escalators that travel down to the fare control. An elevator adjacent to the eastern surface entrance travels down directly to the platform, with a single faregate and ticket machine to access the platform proper. The separate accessible and general entrances are a relative rarity in the Washington Metro system; only Rosslyn, Takoma, Judiciary Square and Ballston-MU stations share this feature.
