= Cathedral Heights =

Coordinates: 38°56′28″N 77°4′56″W

- Neighborhood of Washington, D.C.
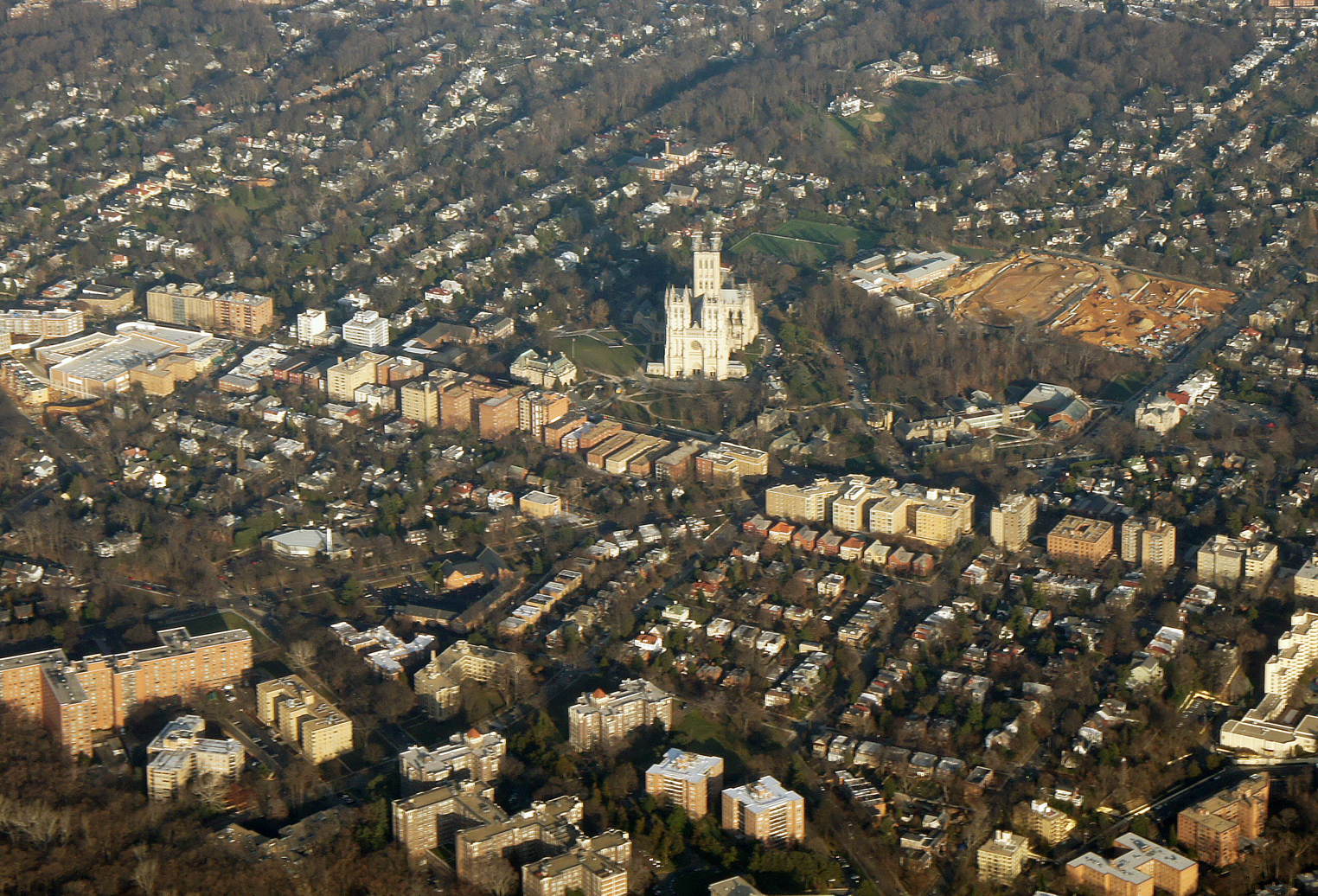
- View of Washington National Cathedral and the surrounding Cathedral Heights neighborhood

- Country: United States
- State/District: District of Columbia
- Quadrant: Northwest
- Ward: Ward 3
- Area code: 202

Cathedral Heights is a neighborhood of Washington, D.C., located in Northwest D.C. Primarily residential, the neighborhood has a commercial corridor of shops and restaurants along Wisconsin Avenue. Cathedral Heights is named for Washington National Cathedral, which sits at the heart of the neighborhood.

== Geography ==
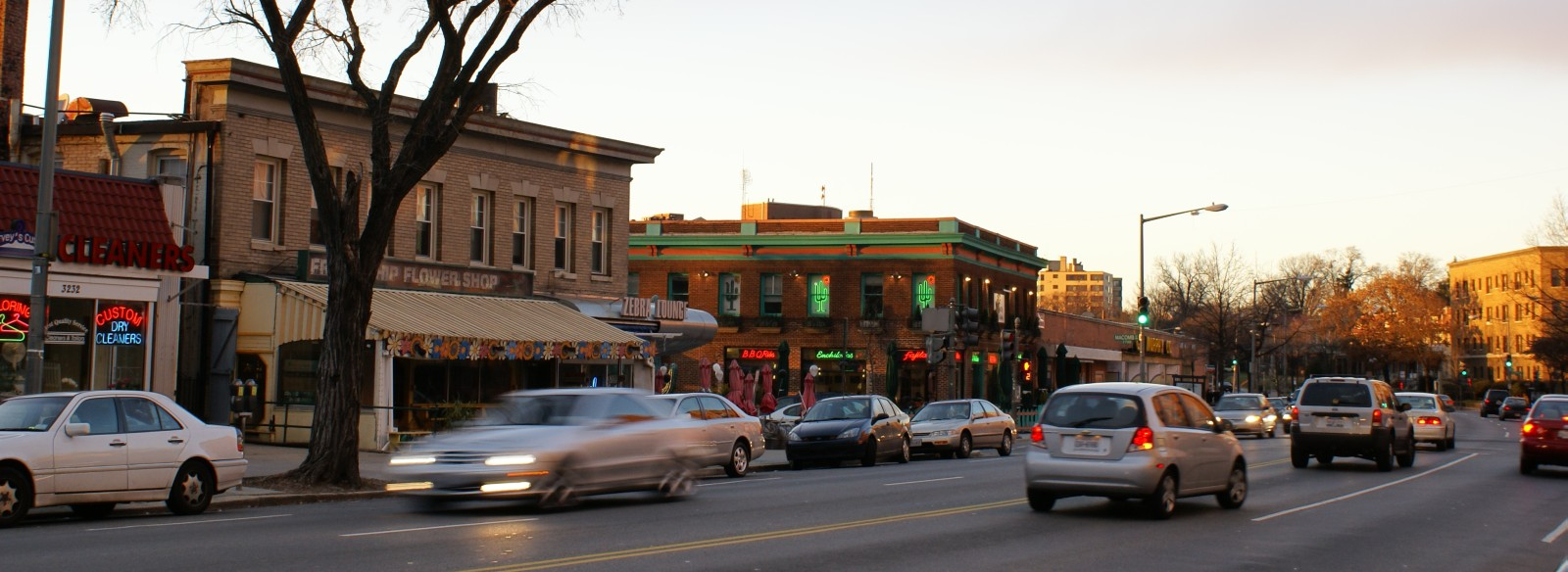
Shops on Wisconsin Avenue

Cathedral Heights is bordered by the neighborhoods of Tenleytown to the north, Cleveland Park to the northeast, Woodley Park to the east, American University Park to the west, and Glover Park to the south.

== Architecture ==
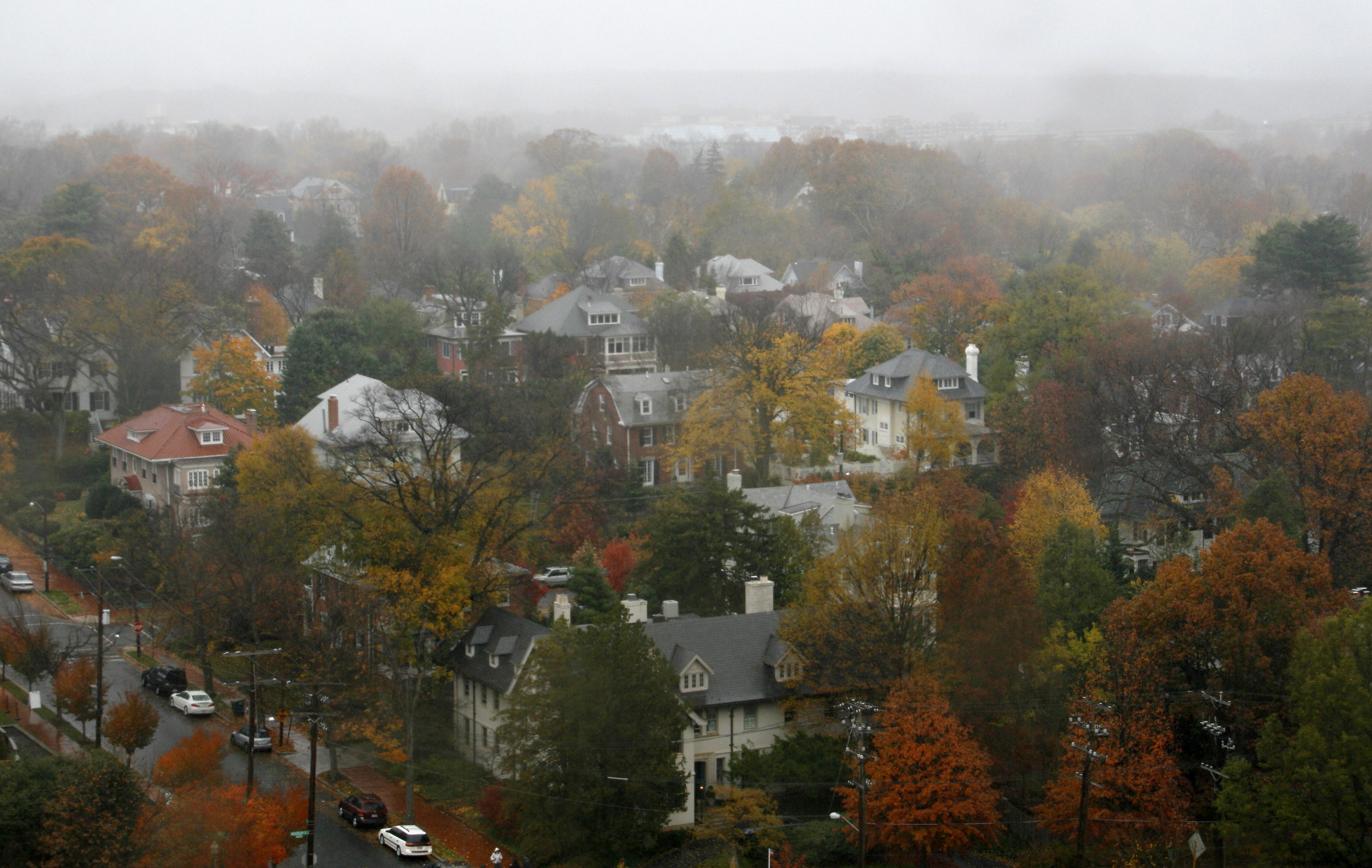
Cathedral Heights homes viewed from the Washington National Cathedral's observation gallery

Cathedral Heights is a quiet neighborhood in the shadow of the historic Washington National Cathedral, composed primarily of single-family detached houses and Edwardian row houses, although the Wisconsin Avenue and Cathedral Avenue corridors of Cathedral Heights are lined with apartment buildings, condominiums, and cooperative complexes.

== Media ==
In Season 2, Episode 1 of House of Cards, U.S. Rep. Frank Underwood (D-S.C.) meets with reporter Zoe Barnes at the fictitious Cathedral Heights Metro station. The actual scene was filmed at the Charles Center subway stop in Baltimore, Maryland, where much of the filming for House of Cards was done.
