= Glover Park =

- Neighborhood of Washington, D.C.
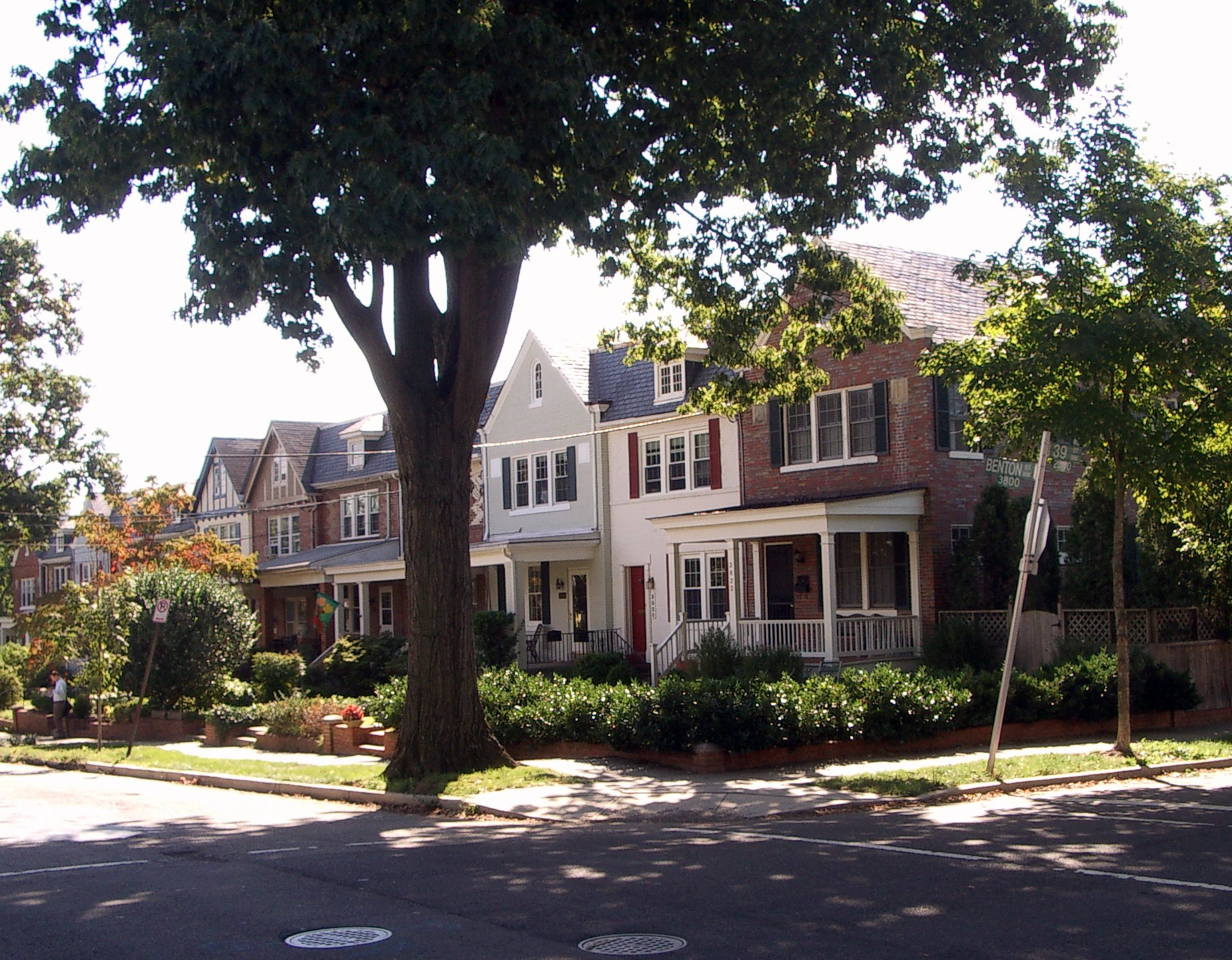
- Benton Street in Glover Park (2006)

- Map of Washington, D.C., with Glover Park highlighted in red
- Coordinates: 38.9225°N 77.074722°W
- Country: United States
- District: Washington, D.C.
- Ward: Ward 3

Government
  - Councilmember: Matthew Frumin
- Postal code: ZIP code

Glover Park is a neighborhood in northwest Washington, D.C., about a half mile north of Georgetown and just west of the United States Naval Observatory and Number One Observatory Circle (the Vice President's mansion). Every morning and evening, Glover Park residents can hear the Naval Observatory play the sounding of colors synchronized to the nation's Master Clock. It is named after Charles Carroll Glover.

== Location ==
The neighborhood's western border is an extension of Rock Creek Park called Glover-Archbold Park (named after Charles Carroll Glover and Anne Mills Archbold, who each donated part of the land). Glover Park's northern border is Fulton Street, near the Washington National Cathedral, and the Cathedral Heights neighborhood. Its southern border is Whitehaven Park, another branch of Rock Creek Park. Beyond Whitehaven to the south lies the Burleith neighborhood and Georgetown University while to the east of the neighborhood lies Woodley Park.

== Description ==
Local claims to fame include several embassies, including the sprawling Embassy of Russia in Washington (with its legendary tunnels beneath) and the Visa Office of the Chinese embassy. Wisconsin Avenue in Glover Park is home to a variety of restaurants and other businesses. Guy Mason Park is between Wisconsin Avenue and the Naval Observatory just south of Calvert Street. It is the location of a softball diamond, a playground for small children, and an unofficial enclosed dog park. Guy Mason Park is also the location of the annual Glover Park Day festival, held in early June.

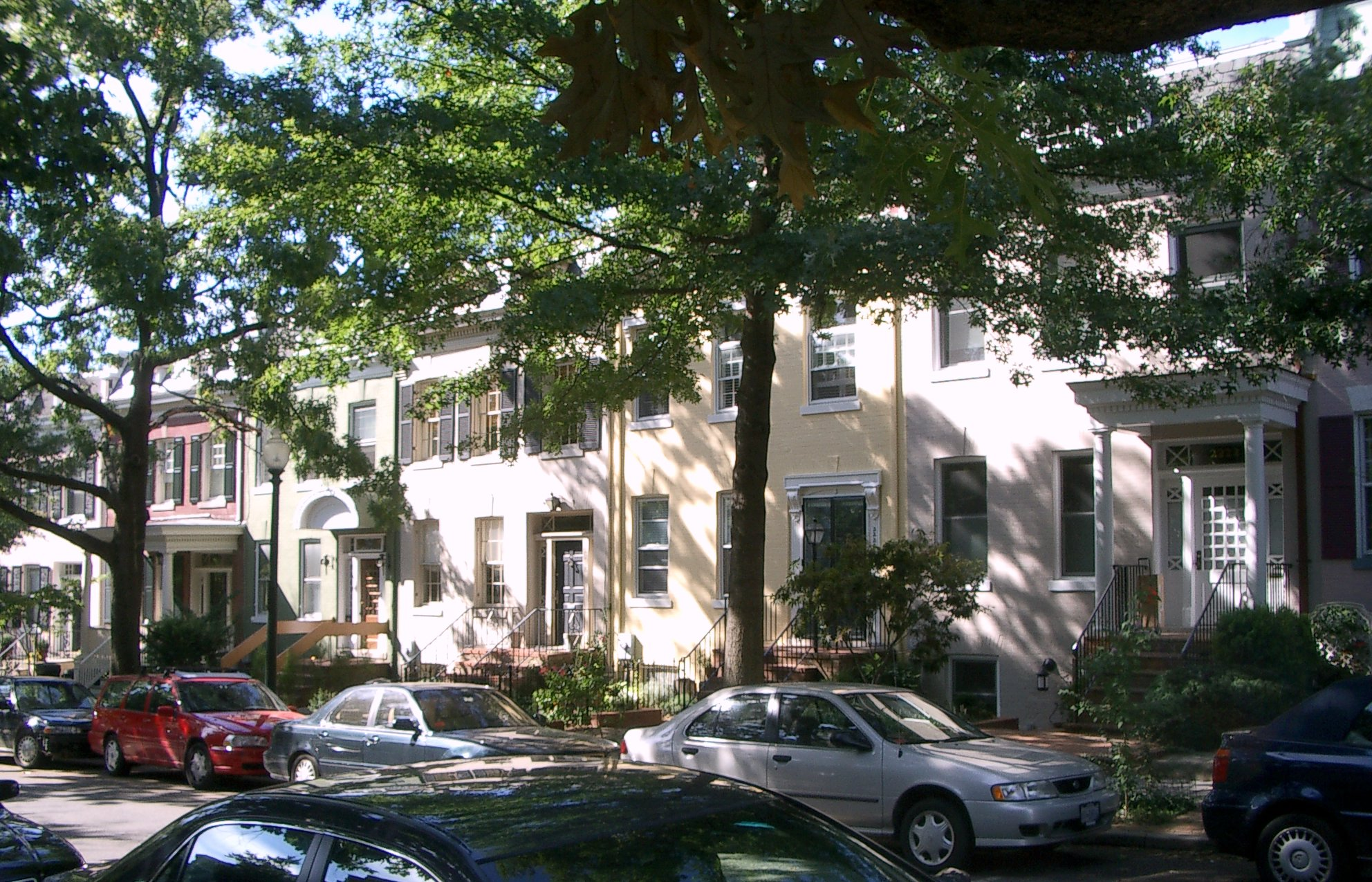
Hall Place in Glover Park

Housing in Glover Park is a mix of apartment buildings and porch-front rowhouses built in the 1920s and 1930s. The neighborhood's elementary school, Benjamin Stoddert Elementary, is one of the most highly rated schools in the District. Neighborhood Cluster 14 (Glover Park, Cathedral Heights, and McLean Gardens) has one of the lowest crime rates in the District. Glover Park residents harvest crops from small, individual garden plots in the two Victory gardens leased from the National Park Service. On the field adjacent to Stoddert Elementary, Glover Park has hosted the Glover Park Co-ed Softball League, one of the Washington Metropolitan Area's most well-known co-ed slow pitch softball leagues, since 1982. DC Stoddert Soccer, a nonprofit league with over 5,000 players, was founded on this field and takes its name from it.

The neighborhood is named for Washingtonian Charles Carroll Glover, an influential late 19th and early 20th century banker and philanthropist. He is credited with the creation of the city's Rock Creek Park system and with an influential role in the creation of Embassy Row through generous land donations. He is also considered the father of the National Zoo and Rock Creek Parkway.

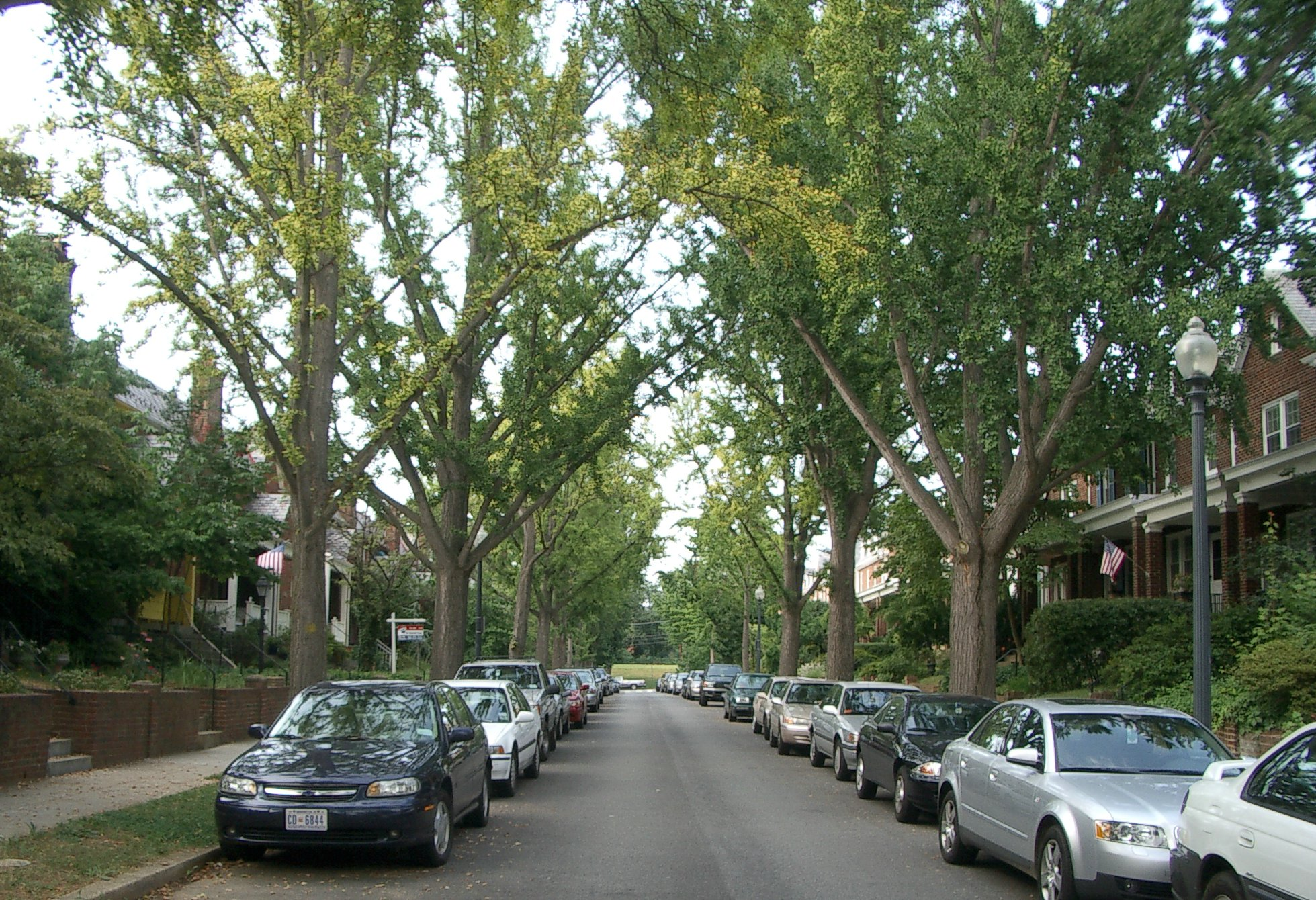
39th Place in Glover Park

The family of Charles Glover pronounces their last name so that it rhymes with "cover." However, many people in Washington, including longtime residents, newcomers, and even the Washington Metropolitan Area Transit Authority (WMATA) pronounce the name so it rhymes with "clover."

== Education ==
The local public schools are operated by the District of Columbia Public Schools.

The area is zoned to:

- Benjamin Stoddert Elementary School (located in Glover Park)
- Hardy Middle School
- Jackson-Reed High School

== See also ==
- List of neighborhoods of the District of Columbia by ward
- Holy Rood Cemetery
- Charles C. Glover
