= Connecticut Avenue-Mount Pleasant Line =

Daily bus route in Washington, D.C., USA

D72
- Connecticut Avenue-Mount Pleasant Line

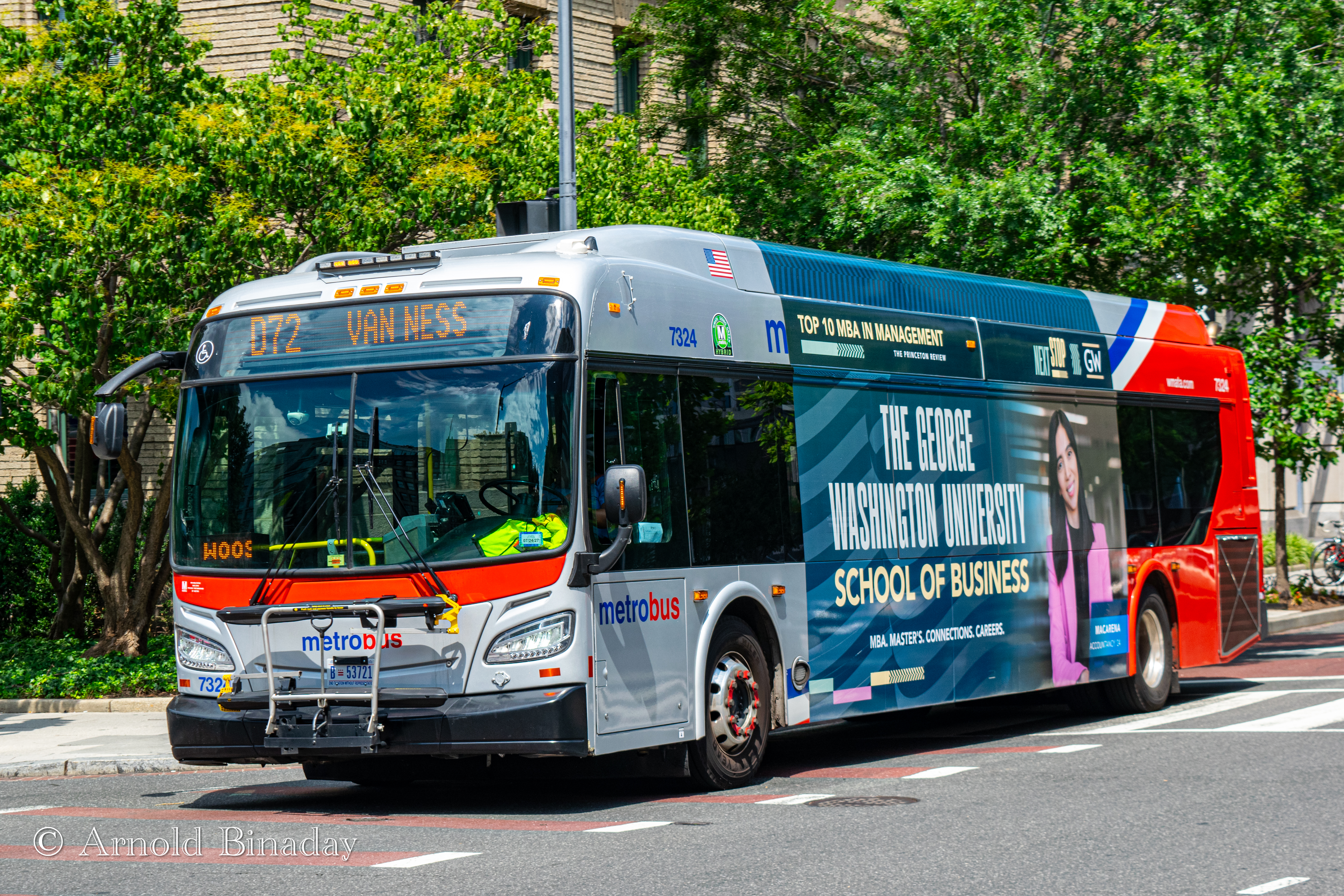
- Route D72 at Farragut Square

Overview
- System: Metrobus
- Operator: Washington Metropolitan Area Transit Authority
- Garage: Western
- Status: Active
- Began service: 40 & 42: 1872; 44 & 46: September, 1978; 43: December 28, 2008; D72: June 29, 2025
- Ended service: 40, 44, & 46: March 1995; 42, 43: June 28, 2025

Route
- Locale: Northwest
- Communities served: Forest Hills, Cleveland Park, Mount Pleasant, Adams Morgan, Dupont Circle, Downtown
- Landmarks served: Van Ness–UDC station, Cleveland Park station, Farragut North station, Farragut West station, Farragut Square, Lafayette Square, McPherson Square station
- Start: Van Ness–UDC station Mount Pleasant
- Via: Porter Street NW, Klingle Road NW, Park Road NW, Mount Pleasant Street NW, Columbia Road NW, Connecticut Avenue NW, H Street / I Street NW
- End: McPherson Square station

Service
- Frequency: 12 - 20 minutes
- Operates: 4:00 AM – 12:00 AM
- Ridership: 780,787 (42, FY 2025); 696,399 (43, FY 2025)
- Transfers: SmarTrip only
- Timetable: Connecticut Avenue-Mount Pleasant Line

The Connecticut Avenue-Mount Pleasant Line, designated Route D72, is a daily bus route in Washington, D.C., It was a streetcar line until the 1960s.

== Route ==
Route D72 operates at nearly all hours of the day daily between Mount Pleasant and McPherson Square station station of the Blue, Orange and Silver Lines of the Washington Metro. Every other trip is extended from Mount Pleasant to Van Ness-UDC station of the Red Line of the Washington Metro. Route D72 operates out of Western division.

== History ==
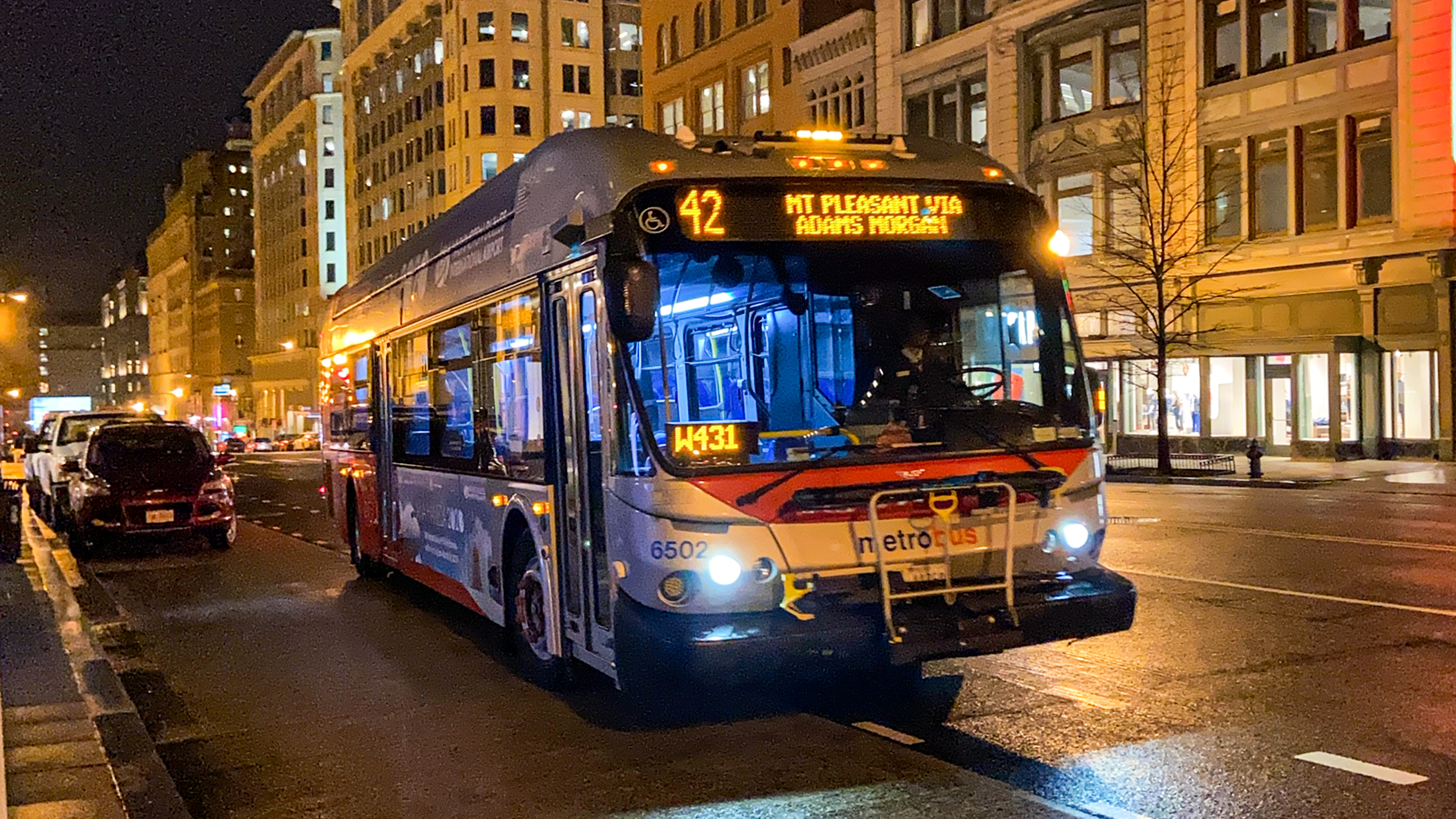
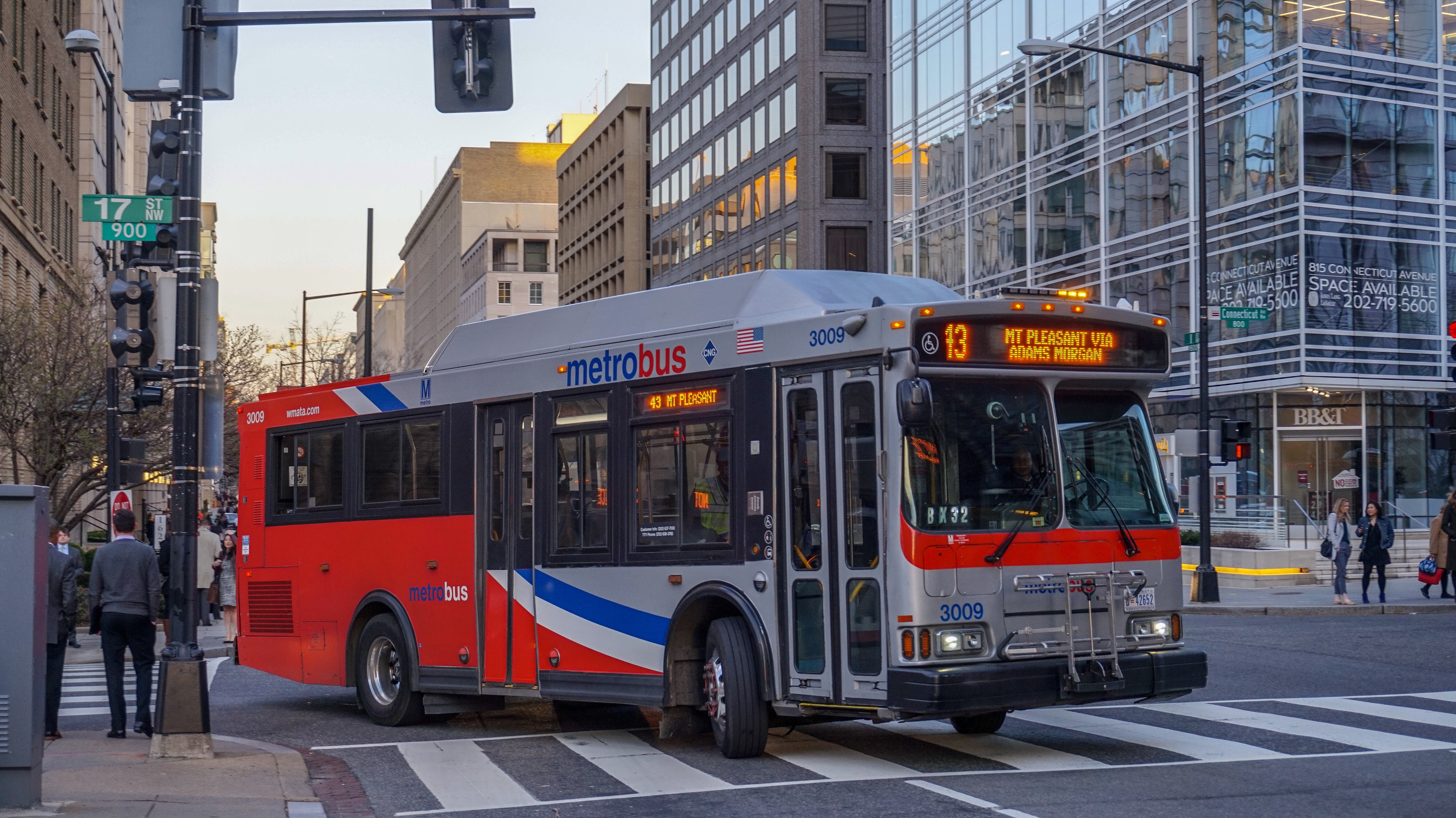
Former Routes 42 and 43.

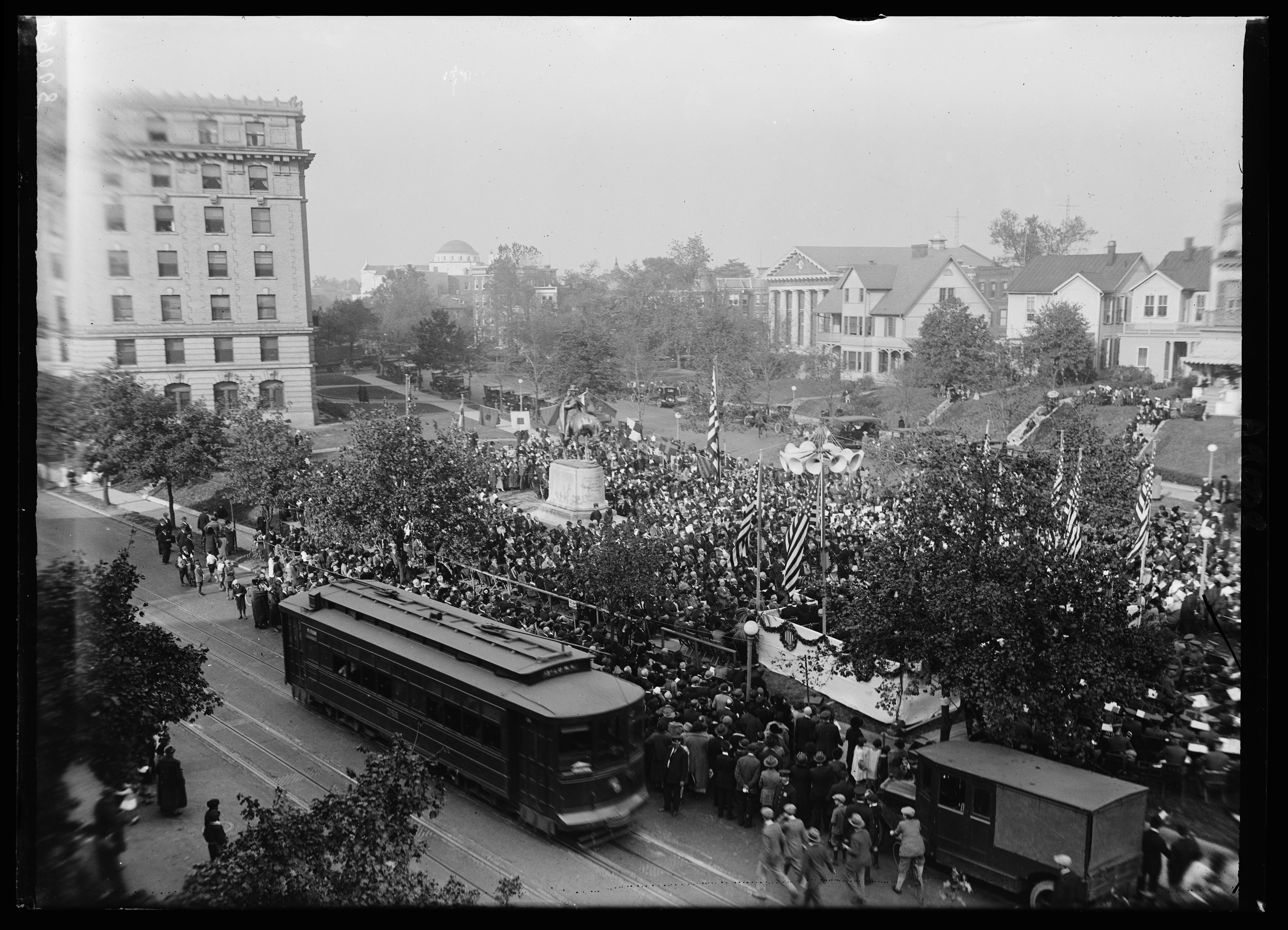
A Washington Railway and Electric Company streetcar rolls past the Francis Asbury Memorial at the southern end of Mount Pleasant in 1924.

=== Streetcar era ===
Route 40 and 42 began operation in 1872 as the Mount Pleasant Streetcar Line, a horsecar service. The horse-drawn cars were replaced between 1896 and 1900 by electric streetcars operated by the Metropolitan Railroad.

The line was acquired in 1902 by the Washington Railway and Electric Company, which merged to become the Capital Traction Company in the 1930s, and operated as DC Transit after 1956.

Route 40 operated from Mount Pleasant through downtown Washington, D.C., to Seat Pleasant, Maryland; while Route 42 ran from Mount Pleasant to the Kingman Park neighborhood in eastern D.C.

Both routes began at Mount Pleasant and ran to H Street, turning east there, south on 14th Street NW, and east on F Street NW along the F Street Line. At 5th Street NW, Route 40 turned south, continuing east around the north side of the Capitol and along East Capitol Street to 15th Street NE, while Route 42 turned north and east past Washington Union Station on the East Washington Line, ending at D Street NE and 13th Street NE. Route 40 ran east to Seat Pleasant via East Capitol Street NE, Southern Avenue NE, 63rd Street NE, Eastern Avenue NE, 61st Street NE, Dix Street NE, 63rd Street NE, Southern Avenue NE, and East Capitol Street NE.

=== Bus era ===
The Route 40 streetcar line was replaced by buses on December 3, 1961; 40 followed on January 28, 1962.

On February 4, 1973, the 40 and 42 were acquired by WMATA when they acquired DC Transit and three bus companies that operated throughout the Washington metropolitan area and merged them into the Metrobus system.

On March 27, 1976, when Farragut North station, Metro Center station, Judiciary Square station, and Union Station opened, routes 40 and 42 began serving each of the stations in the middle of the routes.

On January 17, 1977, when Dupont Circle station opened, routes 40 and 42 served the Dupont Circle station in the middle of their routes.

On September 24, 1978, route 42 was extended southeast of its original terminus at the intersection of D and 13th Street NE in Kingman Park to terminate at the new Stadium–Armory station; route 40 began serving the new station. Routes 40 and 42 were shifted slightly to serve the District of Columbia General Hospital next to Stadium Armory. Several short routes were introduced to add service along stretches of routes 40 and 42: 44, alongside route 42 between Stadium–Armory station and Mount Pleasant; 45, alongside the 40, 42, and 44 between Mount Pleasant and the Bureau of Engraving; and 46, alongside the 40, 42, and 44 between Mount Pleasant and the Kennedy Center.

On January 4, 1981, roughly two months after the Capitol Heights station opened, route 40 was truncated to only operate between Mount Pleasant and Capitol Heights station, via Metro Center, Washington Union Station, and Stadium–Armory station. The segment of 40's routing between Capitol Heights station and the former terminus in Seat Pleasant, Maryland, was replaced by route F14. Route U8 also began operating on the particular segment of routes 42 and 44 between Seat Pleasant and Capitol Heights station, during the early 1990s once it was introduced. No changes were made to the 42, 44, 45, 46 Metrobus Routes, which operated as part of the Mount Pleasant Line.

Between the 1980s and 1990s, route 45 was discontinued and replaced by routes 40, 42, 44, and 46.

In March 1995, routes 40, 44, and 46 were discontinued; 42 was truncated to connect Mount Pleasant and Metro Center. The segment of 40, 42, and 44 between Metro Center station and Washington Union Station was replaced by the Sibley Hospital–Stadium Armory Line (D1, D3, and D6). The segment of 40, 42, and 44 between Union Station and Stadium–Armory station was replaced by the D6 and the 96 and 97. The remaining segment of 40 between Union Station and Capitol Heights station was replaced by the 96 and 97.

On December 28, 2008, a new route 43 was introduced to operate alongside 42 between Mount Pleasant and Farragut Square, skipping Dupont Circle station via the Connecticut Avenue underpass. Route 43 began operating during the weekday peak-hours in the peak direction to alleviate crowding on the 42.

In 2019, WMATA proposed to add daily service on Route 43, which alternated with Route 42 trips serving Dupont Circle. Route 42 would continue to operate early mornings and late nights daily, and evenings on Sundays only.

The changes were recommended in a WMATA technical memorandum of October 2018: "Metrobus Service Evaluation Study: Mount Pleasant Line: 42, 43 and Connecticut Avenue Line: L1, L2." The memo also said that sending more buses under Dupont Circle would avoid congestion and reduce travel time for passengers continuing past Dupont Circle in each direction. The memo also suggested altering running time to provide a more realistic schedule and to reach at least 80% on-time performance. Recent on-time performance for the line was:

December 2018-June 2019 Average Percent of Buses On-Time
Route	Weekday	Saturday	Sunday
42 Northbound	70.1%	75.9%	73.6%
42 Southbound	76.3%	81.0%	77.9%
43 Northbound	61.0%	-	-
43 Southbound	85.8%	-	-

During the COVID-19 pandemic, route 43 was suspended and route 42 was reduced to operate on its Saturday supplemental schedule during the weekdays beginning on March 16, 2020. On March 18, 2020, the line was further reduced to operate on its Sunday schedule. Weekend service was later suspended on March 21, 2020.

On August 23, 2020, all weekend service was restored for Routes 42 and 43. Additionally, Route 43 was extended to Gallery Place station and Metro Center station via the 42 routing along H Street, I Street, 9th Street, F Street, and 11th Street. Route 43 also added daily service operating every other trip from the 42, travelling underneath Dupont Circle and skipping Dupont Circle station. Service would run between 6 a.m. to 10 p.m. daily.

In February 2021 during the FY2022 budget, WMATA proposed to eliminate the 42 and 43 routing between Farragut Square and Gallery Place station due to alternative services. It however would operate every 12 minutes daily. Subsequently on April 22, 2021, WMATA approved the FY2022 budget and received federal funding to avoid service cuts.

On June 10, 2021, WMATA proposed to reroute the 42 and 43 to the Kennedy Center, eliminating service between Farragut Square and Metro Center station as part of WMATA's Pandemic Recovery Plan.

On September 5, 2021, routes 42 and 43 were rerouted to operate to the Kennedy Center via 18th Street, 19th Street, and Virginia Avenue NW to replace Route 80 service. Service to Gallery Place and Metro Center was eliminated.

Due to rising cases of the COVID-19 Omicron variant, the line was reduced to its Saturday service on weekdays. Full weekday service resumed on February 7, 2022.

In 2024 during WMATA's FY2024 Budget crisis, WMATA proposed to terminate all 42 and 43 service at Farragut Square and eliminate all weekend service. Service between Farragut Square and Kennedy Center would be eliminated. However on April 25, 2024, Metro’s Board of Directors approved a $4.8 billion capital and operating budget which avoided service cuts.

=== Better Bus Redesign ===
In 2022, WMATA launched its Better Bus Redesign project, which aimed to redesign the entire Metrobus Network and is the first full redesign of the agency's bus network in its history.

In April 2023, WMATA launched its Draft Visionary Network. As part of the drafts, WMATA proposed to reroute the 42 and 43 to Washington Union Station and extend the route from Mount Pleasant to Van Ness–UDC station. The new route, which was named Route DC104 in the proposal, would operate between Van Ness–UDC station and Union station via Connecticut Avenue NW, Cleveland Park station, Porter Street NW, Klingle Road NW, Park Road NW, Mount Pleasant Street NW, Columbia Road NW, Connecticut Avenue NW again, Dupont Circle station, Farragut Square, I Street NW, H Street NW, McPherson Square station, New York Avenue NW, K Street NW, Gallery Place station, and Massachusetts Avenue NW. Service to the Kennedy Center was to be served by the proposed Route DC216, operating between Kennedy Center and Stadium–Armory station.

During WMATA's Revised Draft Visionary Network, WMATA renamed the DC104 to Route D72 and kept the same routing, but was modified to bypass Dupont Circle station and use the Dupont Circle underpass with the proposed Route DC216 (Route D24) to serve the Kennedy Center. Service to Dupont Circle was to be served by the proposed Route D74, operating between Rhode Island Avenue station and Farragut Square.

Later, WMATA changed the proposals again with Route D74 being rerouted to Potomac Park instead of Farragut Square. Service to Kennedy Center was also proposed to be served by the proposed Route D12 which would operate between Kennedy Center and Southern Avenue station, and Route D24 would terminate at McPherson Square station. All changes were then proposed during WMATA's 2025 Proposed Network.

During the proposals, Route D12 was renamed to Route D10 and kept its same proposed routing. Route D74 kept its proposed routing.

On November 21, 2024, WMATA approved its Better Bus Redesign Network.

As part of WMATA's Better Bus Redesign beginning on June 29, 2025, routes 42 and 43 were combined and named the D72. The D72 follows the 43’s route between Mount Pleasant and Farragut Square, then turns onto I Street NW before terminating at McPherson Square station along H Street NW. Also during rush hour and early morning weekend hours, the line was extended from Mount Pleasant to Van Ness–UDC station via Park Road NW, Porter Street NW, and Connecticut Avenue NW. Service to Dupont Circle was replaced by an extended Route H8 (renamed into the D74), which terminates at Potomac Park. Service to Kennedy Center was replaced by a rerouted 32 renamed the D10.

During WMATA FY2027 budget proposal, WMATA proposed to extend every other trip from Mount Pleasant to Van Ness station during the weekday midday and all day weekends. All late night service would operate between Van Ness station and McPherson Square. Subsequently the proposal was approved on April 23, 2026.

On June 21, 2026, every other trip would be extended from Mount Pleasant to Van Ness station daily between 6:00 AM to 9:00 PM. All trips between 4:00 AM to 6:00 AM and between 9:00 PM to 12:00 AM will operate the full route between Van Ness station to McPherson Square.
