= Connecticut Avenue Line =

Daily bus line in Washington, D.C., US

D70
- Connecticut Avenue Line

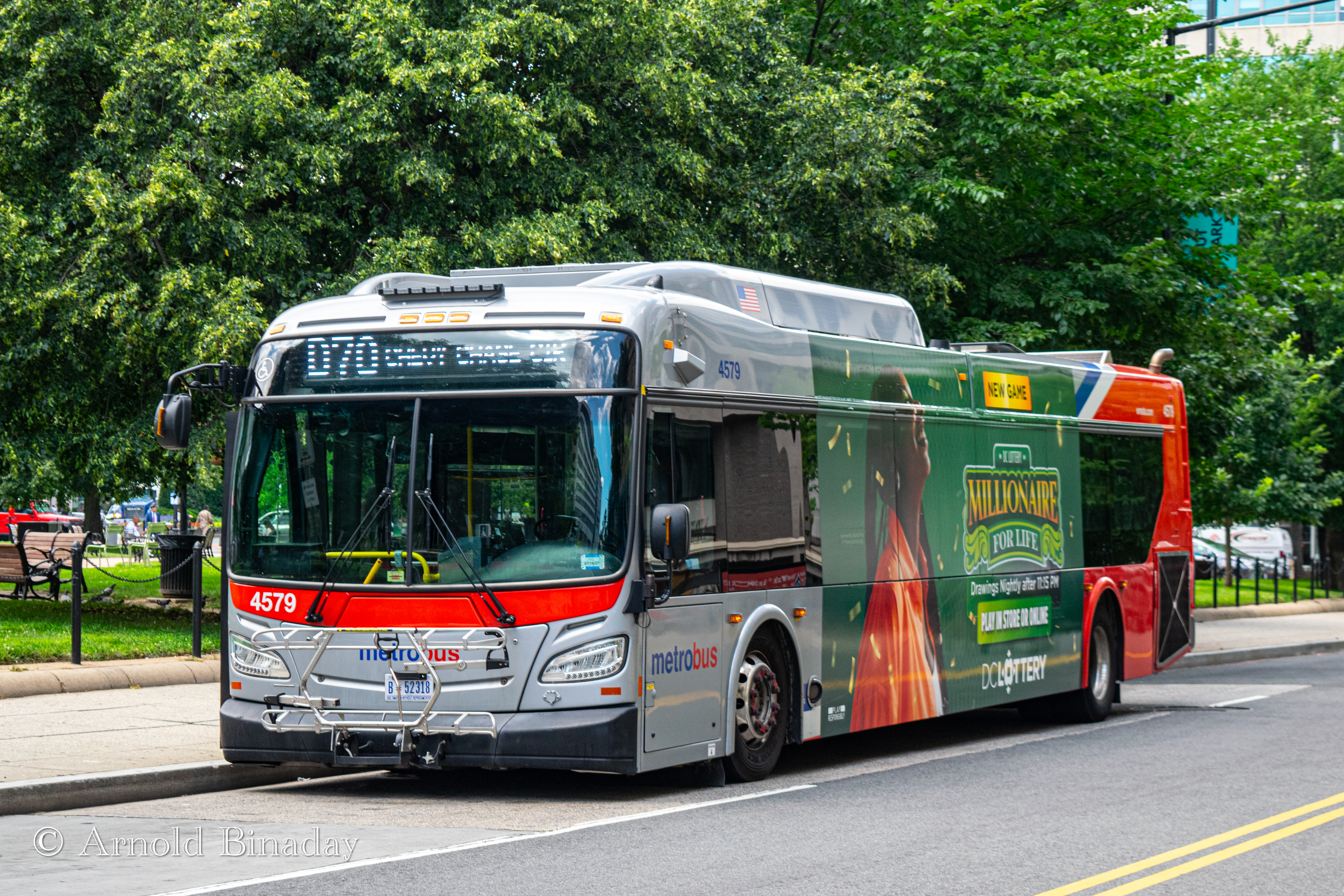
- Route D70 at Farragut Square

Overview
- System: Metrobus
- Operator: Washington Metropolitan Area Transit Authority
- Garage: Western
- Status: Active
- Predecessors: L1, L2, L4

Route
- Locale: Northwest
- Communities served: Downtown, Dupont Circle, Kalorama Heights, Woodley Park, Cleveland Park, Forest Hills, Wakefield, Chevy Chase
- Landmarks served: Farragut Square, Farragut West station, Farragut North station, Woodley Park station, National Zoo, Cleveland Park station, University of the District of Columbia, Van Ness-UDC station, Chevy Chase Circle
- Start: Farragut Square
- Via: Connecticut Avenue NW
- End: Chevy Chase Circle

Service
- Level: Daily
- Frequency: 12-20 minutes
- Journey time: 30-35 minutes
- Operates: 5:00 AM - 2:00 AM
- Ridership: 1,425,316 (FY 2025)
- Transfers: SmarTrip only
- Timetable: Connecticut Avenue Line

The Connecticut Avenue Line, designated Route D70, is a daily bus route in Northwest Washington, D.C., operated by the Washington Metropolitan Area Transit Authority. It operates between Chevy Chase Circle and Farragut Square via Connecticut Avenue NW, connecting multiple communities in Northwest. The line operates every 12 minutes during the weekday peak hours, 20 minutes during the off peak hours and every 30 minutes after 9 PM. Trips take roughly 30-35 minutes to complete.

== Route description ==
The D70 begins at Chevy Chase Circle, just south of Western Avenue and the Maryland state line. It continues down Connecticut Avenue NW continuing south until it reaches Farragut Square. The D70 also passes underneath Dupont Circle via the Connecticut Avenue underpass.

Route D70 operates out of Western division.

=== Former Services ===
The former L1 began (Note: Caution: As of September 5, 2021, the L1 route has not operated since early 2020. It was discontinued on September 5, 2021 and replaced by frequent L2 service. See the History section for this entry.) at the Potomac Park apartments at 18th and C Streets. It runs along Constitution Avenue via 18th and 20th Streets, and turned right on 23rd Street. The route proceeds through Foggy Bottom and the campus of the George Washington University until Washington Circle, where it switched to New Hampshire Avenue for just a few blocks. The route turned north onto 20th Street to avoid Dupont Circle, and eventually reached Connecticut Avenue by way of Massachusetts Avenue and Florida Avenue. The L2 started at Farragut Square, one block north (Note: The southern end of Connecticut Ave NW is at the northwest corner of Lafayette Square, where the avenue intersects with H St NW. At that intersection, the north-south street changes name from Connecticut Avenue NW to Jackson Place NW.) of the southern terminus of Connecticut Avenue, then proceed north along the avenue. It passed underneath Dupont Circle via the Connecticut Avenue underpass, and turned onto the intersection with Florida Avenue and S Street.

The route continued north along the avenue. The L2 took a brief detour into Adams Morgan via Columbia Road, Calvert Street, and the Duke Ellington Bridge. Following Connecticut Avenue northbound, the route serve multiple stations of the Red Line, namely the Woodley Park, Cleveland Park, and Van Ness, until the Red Line diverts from Connecticut Avenue. The route also pass through the Woodley Park and Cleveland Park neighborhoods, of which the former also includes the National Zoological Park. In the Forest Hills neighborhood, the route also provide access to the Van Ness Campus of the University of the District of Columbia, the district's only public university.

Route L2 terminated at Chevy Chase Circle, just south of Western Avenue and the Maryland state line. Route L2 provided transfers to the L8, also known as the Connecticut Avenue–Maryland Line. Essentially L2's continuation into Maryland, the former L8 begins at the nearby Friendship Heights station and serves Connecticut Avenue in Chevy Chase, Kensington, and Aspen Hill.

The former L2 routing also incorporated Route L4, which operated with the L1 and L2 until 2012.

==== Route D70 Stops ====
Bus stop	Direction	Connections
Washington, D.C.
17th Street NW / I Street NW Farragut Square	Northbound stop, Southbound terminal	Metrobus: A49, A58, D10, D20, D72, D80, D94, F19; MTA Maryland Bus: 901, 902, 904, 905, 909, 950, 995; Loudoun County Transit; PRTC OmniRide; Washington Metro: (at Farragut West station) (at Farragut North station)
Connecticut Avenue NW / L Street NW Farragut North station	Bidirectional	Metrobus: D72; Washington Metro:
Connecticut Avenue NW / M Street NW	Bidirectional	Metrobus: D72
Connecticut Avenue NW / 18th Street NW	Northbound	Metrobus: D72
Connecticut Avenue NW / N Street NW	Southbound	Metrobus: D72
Connecticut Avenue NW / R Street NW	Southbound	Metrobus: D72
Connecticut Avenue NW / S Street NW	Northbound	Metrobus: D72
Connecticut Avenue NW / Florida Avenue NW	Northbound	Metrobus: D72, D74
Connecticut Avenue NW / Leroy Place NW	Southbound	Metrobus: D72, D74
Connecticut Avenue NW / California Street NW	Northbound	Metrobus: D72, D74
Connecticut Avenue NW / Wyoming Avenue NW	Southbound	Metrobus: D72, D74
Connecticut Avenue NW / Kalorama Road NW	Bidirectional	
Rock Creek / Taft Bridge
Connecticut Avenue NW / Calvert Street NW Woodley Park station	Bidirectional	Metrobus: C51, C53; Washington Metro:
Connecticut Avenue NW / 24th Street NW Woodley Park station	Southbound	Metrobus: C51, C53; Washington Metro:
Connecticut Avenue NW / Woodley Road NW Woodley Park station	Bidirectional	Metrobus: C51, C53; Washington Metro:
Connecticut Avenue NW / Cathedral Avenue NW	Bidirectional	
Connecticut Avenue NW / Smithsonian's National Zoo	Bidirectional	
Connecticut Avenue NW / Devonshire Place NW	Bidirectional	
Connecticut Avenue NW / Macomb Street NW	Bidirectional	
Connecticut Avenue NW / Ordway Street NW Cleveland Park station	Bidirectional	Metrobus: C61, C87, D72; Washington Metro:
Connecticut Avenue NW / Porter Street NW	Bidirectional	Metrobus: C61, C87, D72
Connecticut Avenue NW / Rodman Street NW	Southbound	Metrobus: C87, D72
Connecticut Avenue NW / Sedgwick Street NW	Bidirectional	Metrobus: C87, D72
Connecticut Avenue NW / Tilden Street NW	Bidirectional	Metrobus: C87, D72
Connecticut Avenue NW / Van Ness Street NW	Bidirectional	Metrobus: C87, D72
Connecticut Avenue NW / Veazey Terrace NW Van Ness–UDC station	Bidirectional	Metrobus: C87, D72; Washington Metro:
Connecticut Avenue NW / Yuma Street NW	Southbound	
Connecticut Avenue NW / Albemarle Street NW	Bidirectional	
Connecticut Avenue NW / Brandywine Street NW	Bidirectional	
Connecticut Avenue NW / Chesapeake Street NW	Bidirectional	
Connecticut Avenue NW / Davenport Street NW	Bidirectional	
Connecticut Avenue NW / Ellicott Street NW	Bidirectional	
Connecticut Avenue NW / Nebraska Avenue NW	Bidirectional	Metrobus: C81, C85, C87
Connecticut Avenue NW / Huntington Street NW	Bidirectional	
Connecticut Avenue NW / Jocelyn Street NW	Bidirectional	
Connecticut Avenue NW / Military Road NW	Bidirectional	
Connecticut Avenue NW / Legation Street NW	Southbound	
Connecticut Avenue NW / Livingston Street NW	Bidirectional	
Connecticut Avenue NW / McKinley Street NW	Bidirectional	Metrobus: C83
Chevy Chase Circle / Connecticut Avenue NW	Southbound stop, Northbound terminal	Ride On: 1, 11

== History ==
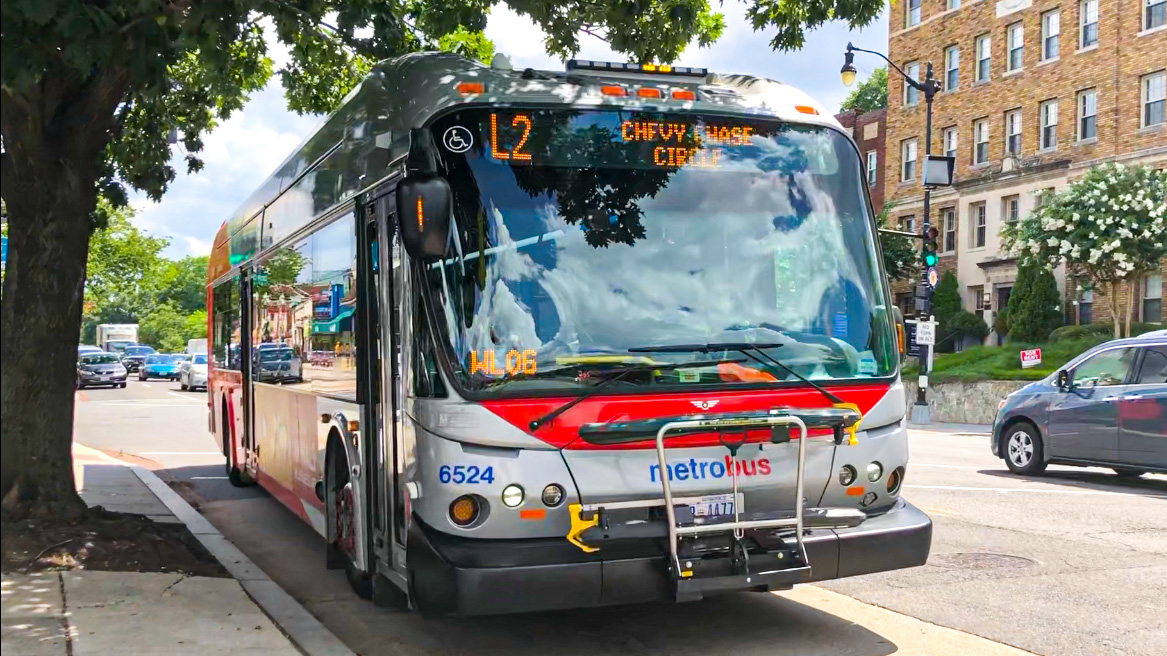
Former Route L2 at Cleveland Park station

At different points, the Connecticut Avenue Line was al operated by the L1, L2, L3, L4, L5, L7, L8, and L9. Eventually, the lines were converted into the Connecticut Avenue Line as the L1, L2, and L4, and then the Connecticut Avenue–Maryland Line as the L7 and L8.

Until June 17, 2012, the Connecticut Avenue Line was also served by the L4. The route operated from Dupont Circle to Chevy Chase Circle via Connecticut Avenue, of which the whole route overlapped with the L1 and L2.

On June 17, 2012, the line was restructured where the L1 would operate along Virginia Avenue NW, between 23rd and C streets NW. Route L2 would operate directly along Connecticut Avenue between Chevy Chase Circle and Farragut Square, while using the underpass at Dupont Circle, except for a diversion via Calvert Street and Columbia Road. Route L4 would be discontinued and replaced by routes L1 and L2 as the route was a duplicate to both the routes.

On December 18, 2016, route L2 late night trips on Fridays and Saturdays were extended to both Friendship Heights station and Bethesda station due to earlier closure of Metrorail.

In 2018, WMATA released a study on the L1 and L2. Proposals sets goes as follows:

- Convert all route L1 trips to route L2 in order to simplify service options and increase weekday frequency between Chevy Chase Circle and Farragut Square
- During weekends, terminate every other Route L2 trip at Woodley Park. Between Chevy Chase Circle to Woodley Park, buses would run every 20 minutes instead of every 30 minutes, BUT between Woodley Park and Farragut Square, buses would run every 60 minutes instead of every 30 minutes.
- Have route L1 operate daily service terminate at 21st Street and Virginia Avenue NW instead of continuing south on 23rd Street and east on Constitution Avenue NW and northbound L1 trips be rerouted to operate along to go around Dupont Circle and north on Connecticut Ave NW instead of its current route via Massachusetts and Florida Avenues NW.

However, none of the proposals went through.

During the COVID-19 pandemic, route L1 was suspended beginning on March 16, 2020 and route L2 operated on its Saturday supplemental schedule. However on March 18, 2020, further changes happened with route L2 operating on its Sunday schedule and weekend service being suspended beginning on March 21, 2020. A modified schedule and all weekend service resumed on August 23, 2020 for Route L2 but all Route L1 remained suspended and late night L2 service to Bethesda station remained suspended.

On September 26, 2020, WMATA proposed to eliminate all route L1 service due to low federal funding. Later in February 2021 during WMATA's FY2022 budget crisis, WMATA proposed to increase span to add late-night service to 2:00 AM on Route L2 beginning in July 2021. However beginning in January 2022, WMATA proposed to eliminate the L2 and replace it with a modified H2 and H4 which would run along Connecticut Avenue north of Calvert Street NW to Friendship Heights station, and Routes 42 and 43 south of Columbia Road NW to replace the L2. Subsequently on April 22, 2021, WMATA approved the FY2022 budget and received federal funding to avoid service cuts.

On June 6, 2021, late-night service was increased to operate up to 2:00 AM on Route L2.

On June 10, 2021, WMATA proposed to increase the L2 to operate every 20 minutes daily between 7:00 AM to 9:00 PM daily as part of WMATA's Pandemic Recovery Plan.

On September 5, 2021, Route L2 service was increased to operate every 20 minutes daily between 7:00 AM to 9:00 PM. This essentially replaced all Route L1 service as WMATA no longer lists the L1 on the WMATA website.

In 2024 during WMATA's FY2024 Budget crisis, WMATA proposed to eliminate all L2 service between Duke Ellington Bridge and Farragut Square. However on April 25, 2024, Metro’s Board of Directors approved a $4.8 billion capital and operating budget which avoided service cuts.

=== Better Bus Redesign ===
In 2022, WMATA launched its Better Bus Redesign project, which aimed to redesign the entire Metrobus Network and is the first full redesign of the agency's bus network in its history.

In April 2023, WMATA launched its Draft Visionary Network. As part of the drafts, WMATA proposed to have the L2 still operate between Chevy Chase Circle and Farragut Square, but the route would remain along Connecticut Avenue NW, not serving the Adams Morgan neighborhood. The route would also be extended north to Bethesda station via Connecticut Avenue and East-West Highway, a similar pattern the L2 had prior to March 2020. The line was named Route DC102 in the drafts. Service inside Adams Morgan via 24th Street, Calvert Street, and Columbia Road would be operated by proposed Routes DC104 (along Columbia Road), and DC213 (along Calvert Street).

During WMATA's Revised Draft Visionary Network, WMATA renamed the DC102 to Route D70, keeping the same routing. Service between Connecticut Avenue and Adams Morgan was to be replaced by proposed routes C51, C53, C55, and C57, having to transfer at Woodley Park station. However prior to the proposals, the D70 was cutback to Chevy Chase Circle with the extension to Bethesda station being shelved. All changes were then proposed during WMATA's 2025 Proposed Network.

On November 21, 2024, WMATA approved its Better Bus Redesign Network.

Beginning on June 29, 2025, the L2 was changed to remain straight on Connecticut Avenue NW and no longer serve Adams Morgan or Duke Ellington Bridge, and it was renamed into the D70, partially reincarnating the former L1. Service along Calvert Street was covered by Route C51 (former Route 96), C53 (former Route 92) and service on Columbia Road was covered by Route D72 (former Routes 42 and 43).
