= Cleveland Park station =

Washington Metro station

Cleveland Park
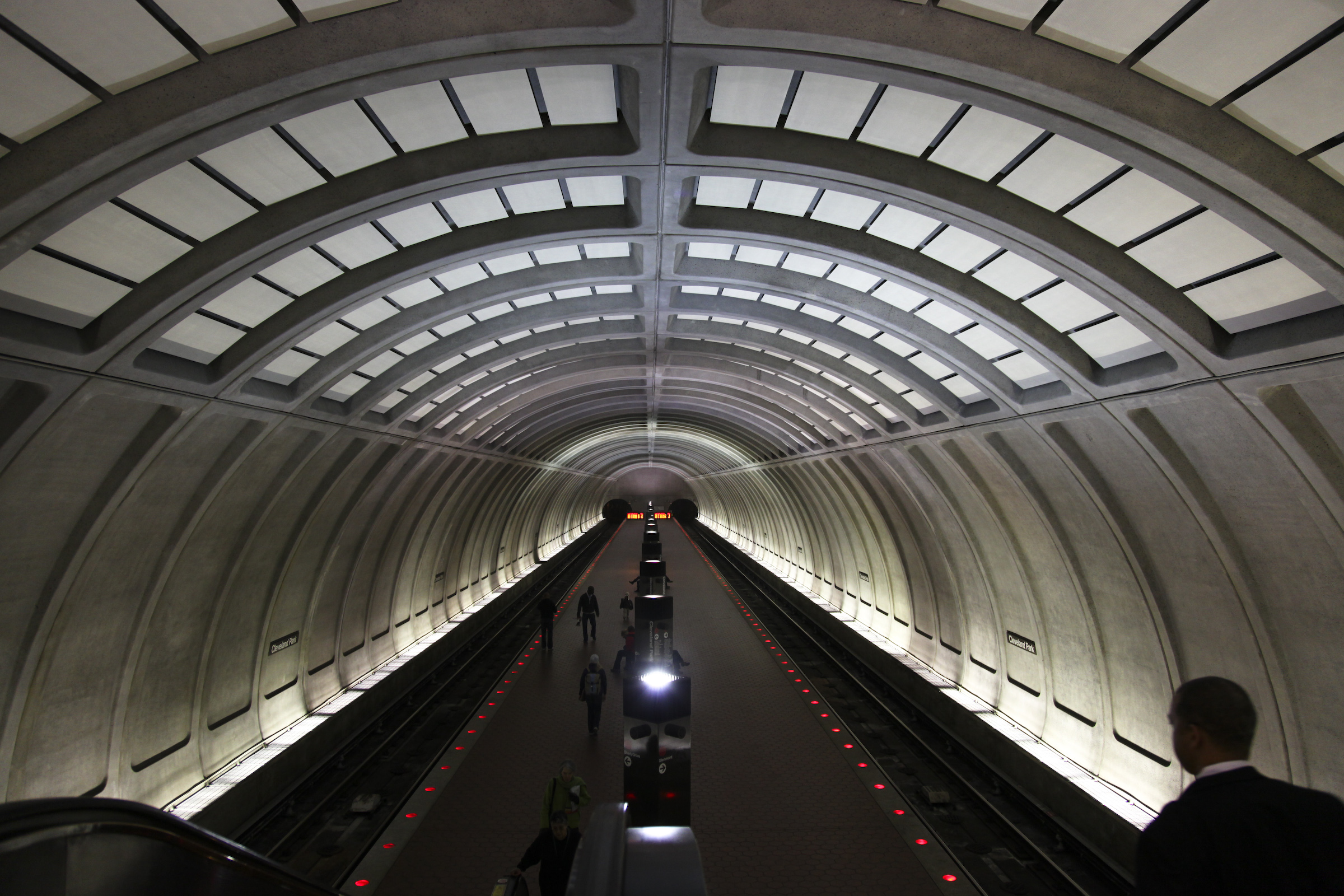
- Station viewed from the esclators and mezzanine in March 2009

General information
- Location: 3599 Connecticut Avenue NW; Washington, D.C.
- Coordinates: 38°56′9.5″N 77°3′30.7″W
- Platforms: 1 island platform
- Tracks: 2
- Connections: Metrobus: C61, C87, D70, D72

Construction
- Structure type: Underground
- Cycle facilities: Capital Bikeshare, 16 racks, 12 lockers
- Accessible: yes

Other information
- Station code: A05

History
- Opened: December 5, 1981

Passengers
- 2025: 2,847 (average weekday)
- Rank: 62 of 98

Services
Preceding station	Washington Metro	Following station
Van Ness–UDC toward Shady Grove	Red Line	Woodley Park toward Glenmont
Route map
Location

Cleveland Park station is an underground rapid transit station on the Red Line of the Washington Metro. Located in the neighborhood of the same name in Washington D.C., it opened on December 5, 1981.

== Station layout ==
There are two entrances to the station, both on Connecticut Avenue but on opposite sides of the street between Ordway Street NW and Porter Street NW. Each of these street-level entrances contains an escalator and a staircase leading to an upper mezzanine that joins the two entrances underground. A set of three escalators descends to the station concourse, which houses fare control and ticket machines.

An escalator and staircase lead down from the fare gates to the platform. An elevator from street level to the concourse is available on the northeastern corner of the intersection of Connecticut Avenue NW and Ordway Street NW and an elevator is available between the concourse and platform after passing through the fare gates. Cleveland Park station has an island platform.

There are a pair of crossovers north of the station. Architecturally, Cleveland Park is similar to other stations along the underground stretch of the Red Line between Woodley Park and Medical Center. Because of the high cost of the waffle design and the relative large depth of these stations, pre-fabricated concrete segments were shipped to the construction site and placed together to form the structure of the station, resulting in a four-coffer station design.

== History ==
While Cleveland Park was part of the initial system plan in 1959, the station opened on December 5, 1981, five years after the first segment began operations. Its opening coincided with the completion of 2.1 miles (3.4 km) of rail northwest of the Dupont Circle station and the opening of Van Ness–UDC and Woodley Park stations.

On June 21, 2016, a heavy rainstorm with as much as 4 inches (100 mm) of rain per hour at times produced flash flooding with a southerly flow along Connecticut Avenue. The north-facing Porter Street entrance was flooded, with water cascading down both the stairs and escalator for over 11 minutes. The escalator was not shut off and continued to run even while underwater at its base, however, no one was electrocuted.

The 5 escalators leading from the surface to the faregate mezzanine were replaced from June 2017 to February 2019. The station was closed from March 26 to June 28, 2020, due to the COVID-19 pandemic.
