= Farragut North station =

Washington Metro station

Farragut North
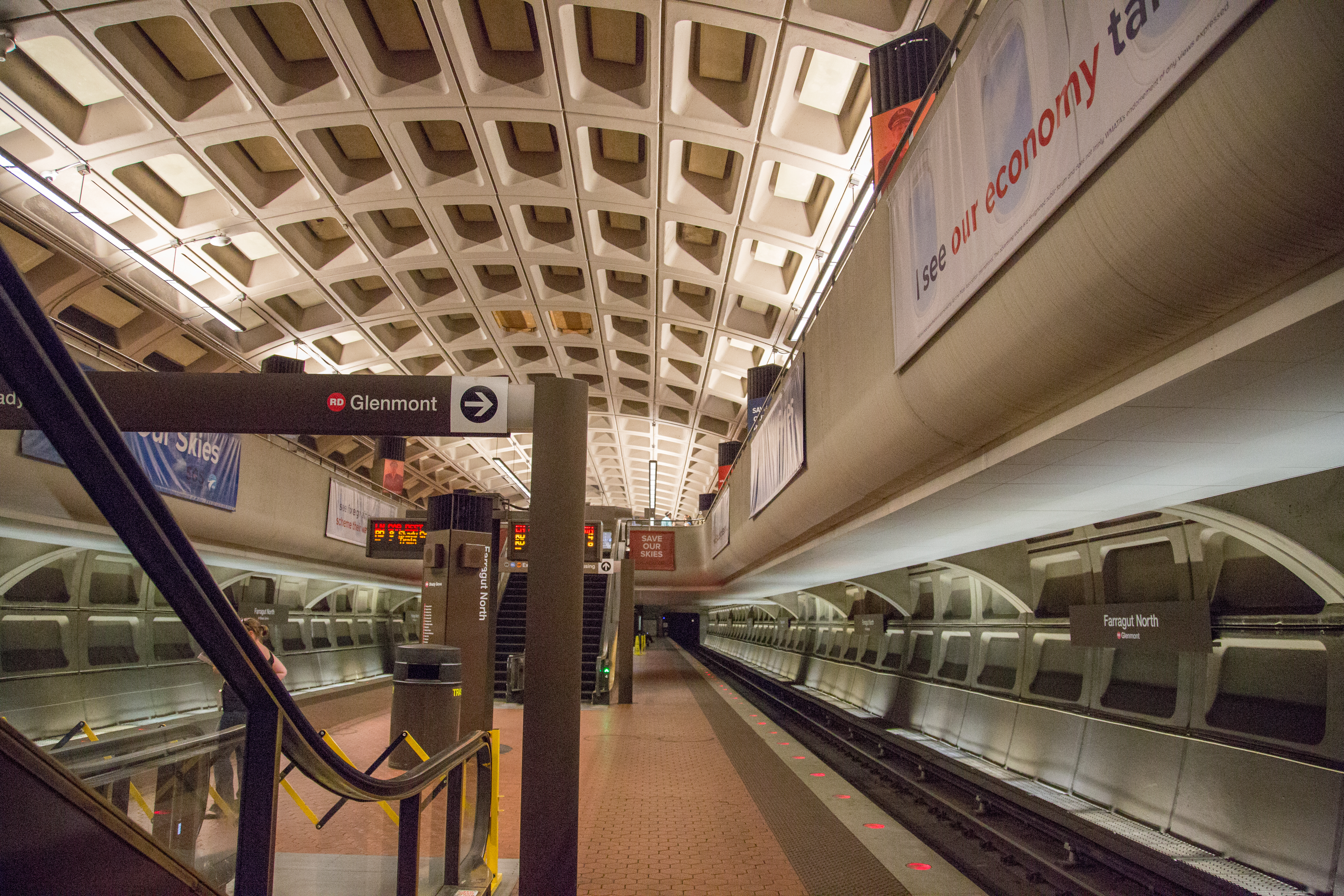
- Station platform in June 2014

General information
- Location: 1001 Connecticut Avenue NW; Washington, D.C.
- Coordinates: 38°54′11″N 77°02′23″W
- Owner: Washington Metropolitan Area Transit Authority
- Platforms: 1 island platform
- Tracks: 2
- Connections: at Farragut West; Metrobus: A49, A58, D10, D20, D70, D72, D80, D94, F19; MTA Maryland Bus: 901, 902, 904, 905, 909, 950, 995; Loudoun County Transit; PRTC OmniRide

Construction
- Structure type: Underground
- Cycle facilities: Capital Bikeshare, 8 racks
- Accessible: Yes

Other information
- Station code: A02

History
- Opened: March 27, 1976

Passengers
- 2025: 13,594 (average weekday)
- Rank: 6 of 98

Services
Preceding station	Washington Metro	Following station
Dupont Circle toward Shady Grove	Red Line	Metro Center toward Glenmont

Former Services
Preceding station	Washington Metro	Following station
Terminus	Green Line Commuter Shortcut	Metro Center toward Greenbelt
Route map
Location

Farragut North station is an underground Washington Metro station in Washington, D.C., located on the Red Line. The station serves Downtown Washington and is immediately northwest of Farragut Square. With an average of 7,615 daily riders in 2023, Farragut North was the sixth-busiest stop in the system.

== History ==
Farragut North was one of the original five stations to open with the first section of the Red Line on March 27, 1976. It was the western terminus of the Red Line until January 17, 1977, when Dupont Circle opened. In 1992, the station coffer was painted white.

On February 12, 2010 at approximately 10:13 a.m. a train derailed in the pocket track immediately to the north of the station when the front car left the tracks. Of the approximately 345 passengers on board, one person was transported to the hospital. All of the passengers were evacuated without incident. The cause of the derailment was investigated by the National Transportation Safety Board. It was found that the train derailed as it was leaving the pocket track due to a derailer, preventing the train from entering the active main tracks and potentially a deadly collision.

On November 24, 2009, a large crack was found in the ceiling during a routine inspection; repairs began the following day. On Wednesday, November 17, 2010, a chunk of concrete fell from the station roof after street construction work on Connecticut Avenue above the station penetrated the station roof. The station reopened the next day after inspection and emergency repairs. During the majority of 2011, the station had structural repairs. The renovation added a new structural support column, patched cracks in the ceiling where moisture is entering the station, and acoustic ceiling tiles replaced. In addition, the escalators were overhauled.

On January 15, 2018, a 7000-series train derailed on the northbound track between Farragut West and Metro Center because of a cracked track. The response was hampered by poor radio reception for Metro's radios inside the tunnel and minimal cell service due to the depth and the lack of repeaters.

In 2019, Metro repaired the station chiller, which had been out of service for almost 4 years.

Between January 15 to January 21, 2021, the station was closed because of security concerns due to the inauguration of Joe Biden.

=== Farragut West tunnel ===
Farragut North is only a block away (across the square) from Farragut West station; however, there is no direct connection between the two stations. WMATA originally planned to have a single Farragut station that would serve as an alternate transfer station to ease congestion that would develop in Metro Center. However, it would have been constructed using the cut-and-cover method, disrupting the square above. The National Park Service, which owns the square, would not allow construction which would disrupt the park, so the stations were built separately with no direct passenger connection.

As part of its long-term capital improvement plan dated September 12, 2002, Metro has proposed building an underground pedestrian tunnel connecting the station with Farragut West to relieve transfer pressure on Metro Center. This work would also include projects to expand capacity at the station, including more fare gates, extending the mezzanines down the length of the station, more platform-mezzanine connections and more.

On October 28, 2011, Metro announced its Farragut Crossing program, allowing riders using a SmarTrip card up to 30 minutes to transfer for free by foot between Farragut West and Farragut North stations.

== Station layout ==
Farragut North station features unique architecture not seen in other stations throughout the system. Its mezzanine stretches across more of the platform and is longer than most, with an open depression looking onto the platform in the middle. There are two elevated mezzanines that serve different escalators and exits. Special buttress-like structures support these stretches of the mezzanine. The low, flat ceiling at the west end was built to accommodate a proposed freeway ramp to Interstate 66, which was never built.

South of this station, a non-revenue track diverges from the outbound track that connects with the outbound track on the shared Orange/Blue/Silver Line tracks between Farragut West and McPherson Square.

Pulse is a 2013 sculpture by Jefre Manuel, installed at the station's Connecticut Avenue and K Street, NW entrance. It is mounted to the wall at the Connecticut Avenue and K Street, NW entrance. The installation is made of acrylic resin tile. It was funded by the Golden Triangle BID and DC Commission on the Arts and Humanities.
