= Van Ness–UDC station =

Washington Metro station

Van Ness–UDC
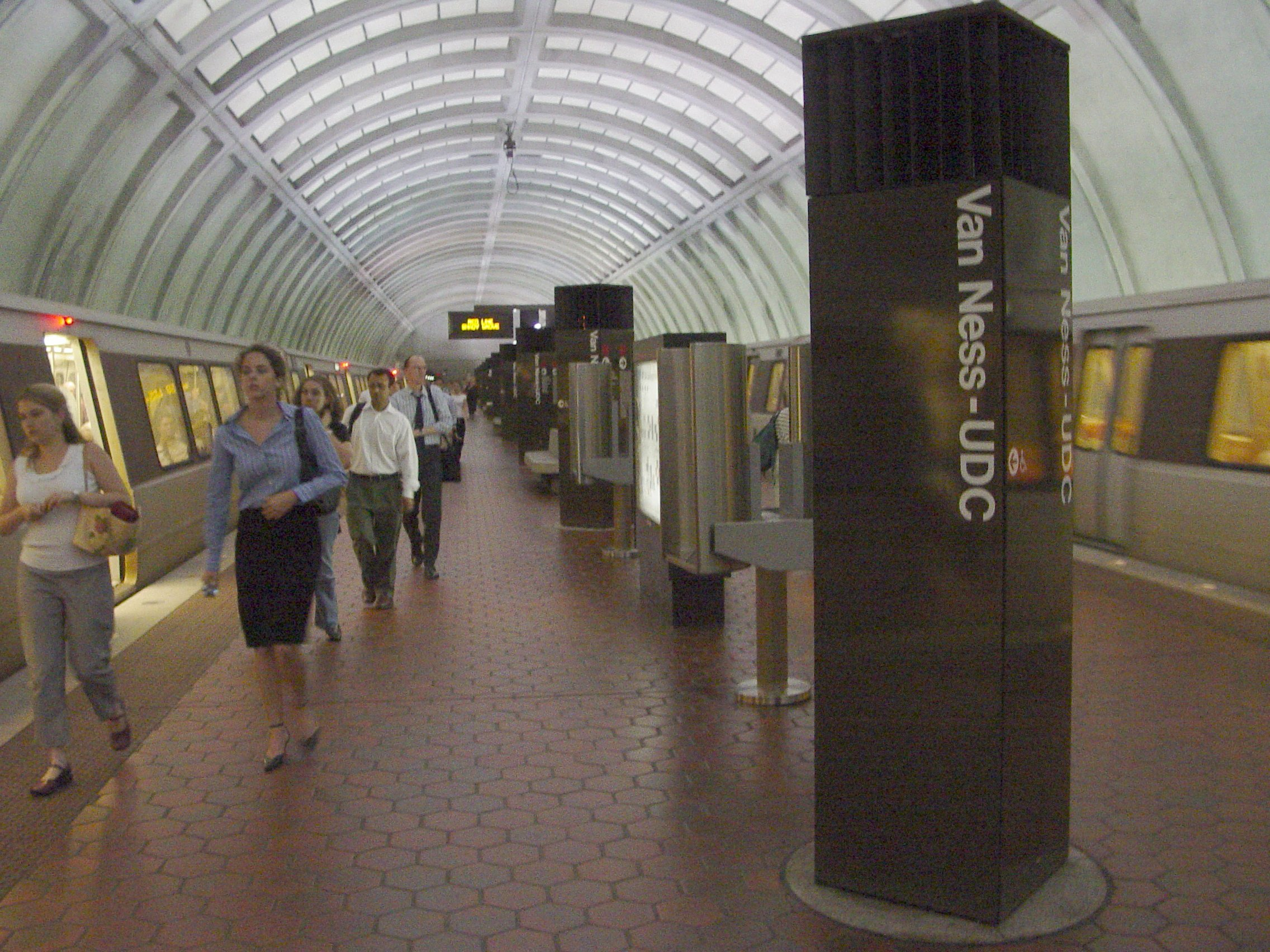
- Van Ness–UDC station platform in June 2004

General information
- Location: 4200 Connecticut Avenue NW; Washington, D.C.
- Coordinates: 38°56′40.4″N 77°3′48.7″W
- Platforms: 1 island platform
- Tracks: 2
- Connections: Metrobus: C87, D70, D72

Construction
- Structure type: Underground
- Cycle facilities: Capital Bikeshare, 9 racks and 8 lockers
- Accessible: Yes

Other information
- Station code: A06

History
- Opened: December 5, 1981

Passengers
- 2025: 3,864 (average weekday)
- Rank: 48 of 98

Services
Preceding station	Washington Metro	Following station
Tenleytown–AU toward Shady Grove	Red Line	Cleveland Park toward Glenmont
Route map
Location

Van Ness–UDC station is a Washington Metro station serving the Forest Hills and North Cleveland Park neighborhoods of Washington, D.C., United States. The island platformed station was opened on December 5, 1981, and is operated by the Washington Metropolitan Area Transit Authority (WMATA). Providing service for the Red Line, the station is on the 4200 block of Connecticut Avenue NW, with exits on either side of the street. The station is also close to the University of the District of Columbia (UDC), as well as to both Howard University School of Law and the Edmund Burke School.

== Station layout ==
Van Ness–UDC station is the northernmost station in the tunnel beneath Connecticut Avenue, one of Washington's busiest thoroughfares. After northbound trains leave the station, the tunnel shifts westwards underneath Yuma Street and at the next station, Tenleytown–AU, the tunnel then parallels the route of Wisconsin Avenue into Maryland.

Architecturally, Van Ness–UDC is similar to other stations along the underground stretch of the Red Line between Woodley Park and Medical Center. Because of the high cost of the four-coffer waffle design and the relative large depth of these stations, pre-fabricated concrete segments were shipped to the construction site and placed together to form the structure of the station. This resulted in what is now known as the "Arch I" station design of the Washington Metro.

Access to the station is provided by banks of escalators on either side of Connecticut Avenue, north of Veazey Terrace, which meet in an upper mezzanine and connect to a set of three long escalators to reach fare control. An elevator on the southwest corner of the intersection connects directly to the main mezzanine.

== History ==
The station opened on December 5, 1981. Its opening coincided with the completion of 2.1 miles (3.4 km) of rail northwest of the Dupont Circle station and the opening of the Cleveland Park and Woodley Park stations. It served as the northwestern terminus of the Red Line until the opening of an extension to the then-named Grosvenor station on August 25, 1984.
