= Woodley Park station =

Washington Metro station

Woodley Park Zoo/Adams Morgan
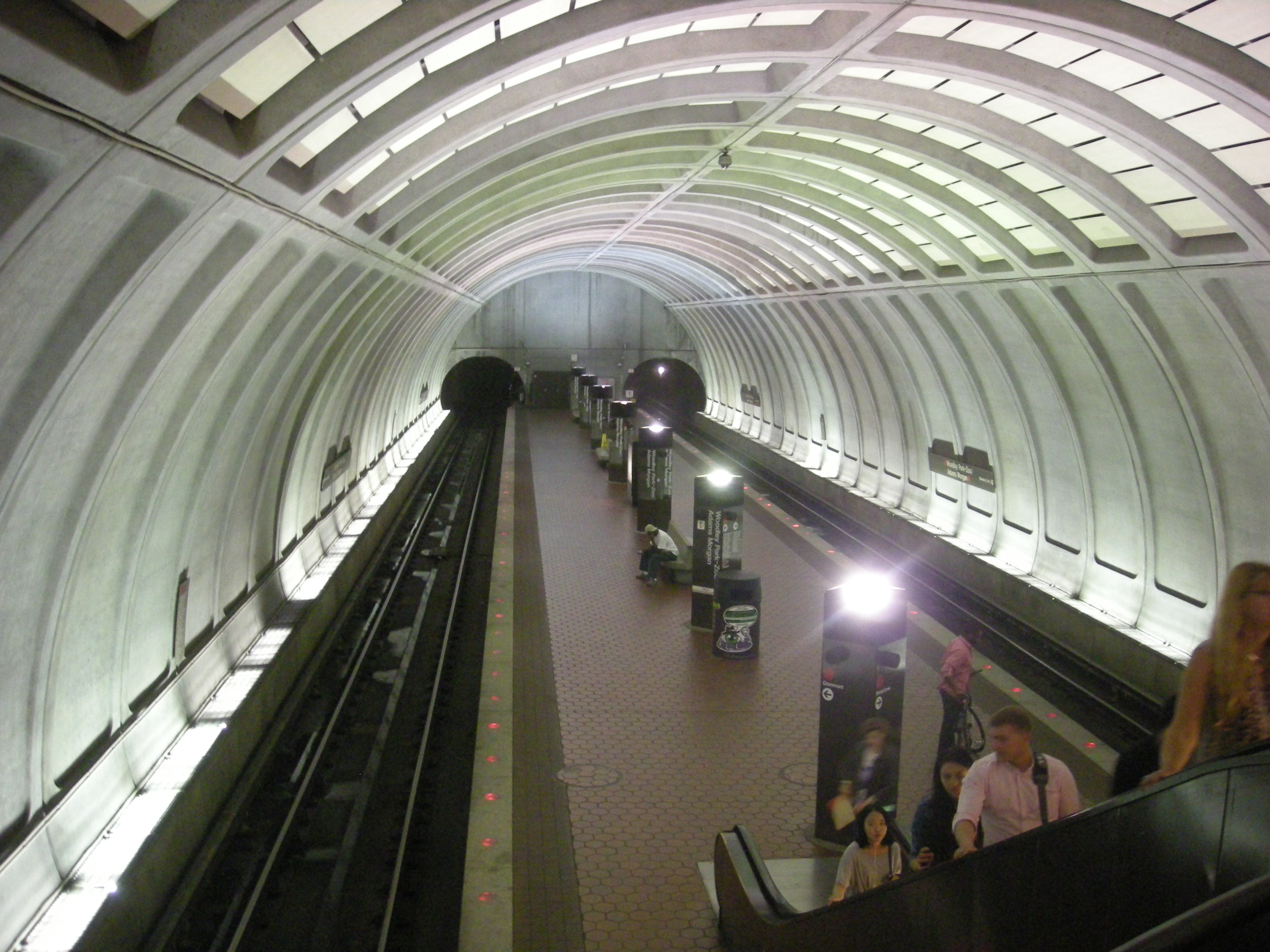
- Woodley Park station platform in August 2014

General information
- Location: 2700 Connecticut Avenue NW; Washington, D.C.
- Coordinates: 38.924505°N 77.052392°W
- Platforms: 1 island platform
- Tracks: 2
- Connections: Metrobus: C51, C53, D70

Construction
- Structure type: Underground
- Depth: 150 ft (46 m)
- Cycle facilities: Capital Bikeshare, 8 racks
- Accessible: Yes

Other information
- Station code: A04

History
- Opened: December 5, 1981
- Former names: Zoological Park (during construction); Woodley Park–Zoo (1981–1999); Woodley Park–Zoo/Adams Morgan (1999–2011); Woodley Park (2011–present)

Passengers
- 2025: 4,473 (average weekday)
- Rank: 39 of 98

Services
Preceding station	Washington Metro	Following station
Cleveland Park toward Shady Grove	Red Line	Dupont Circle toward Glenmont
Route map
Location

Woodley Park station (also known as Woodley Park–Zoo/Adams Morgan) is an underground station on the Red Line of the Washington Metro. Located at 24th Street and Connecticut Avenue Northwest, it serves the neighborhoods of Woodley Park and Adams Morgan in Northwest Washington.

== Station layout ==
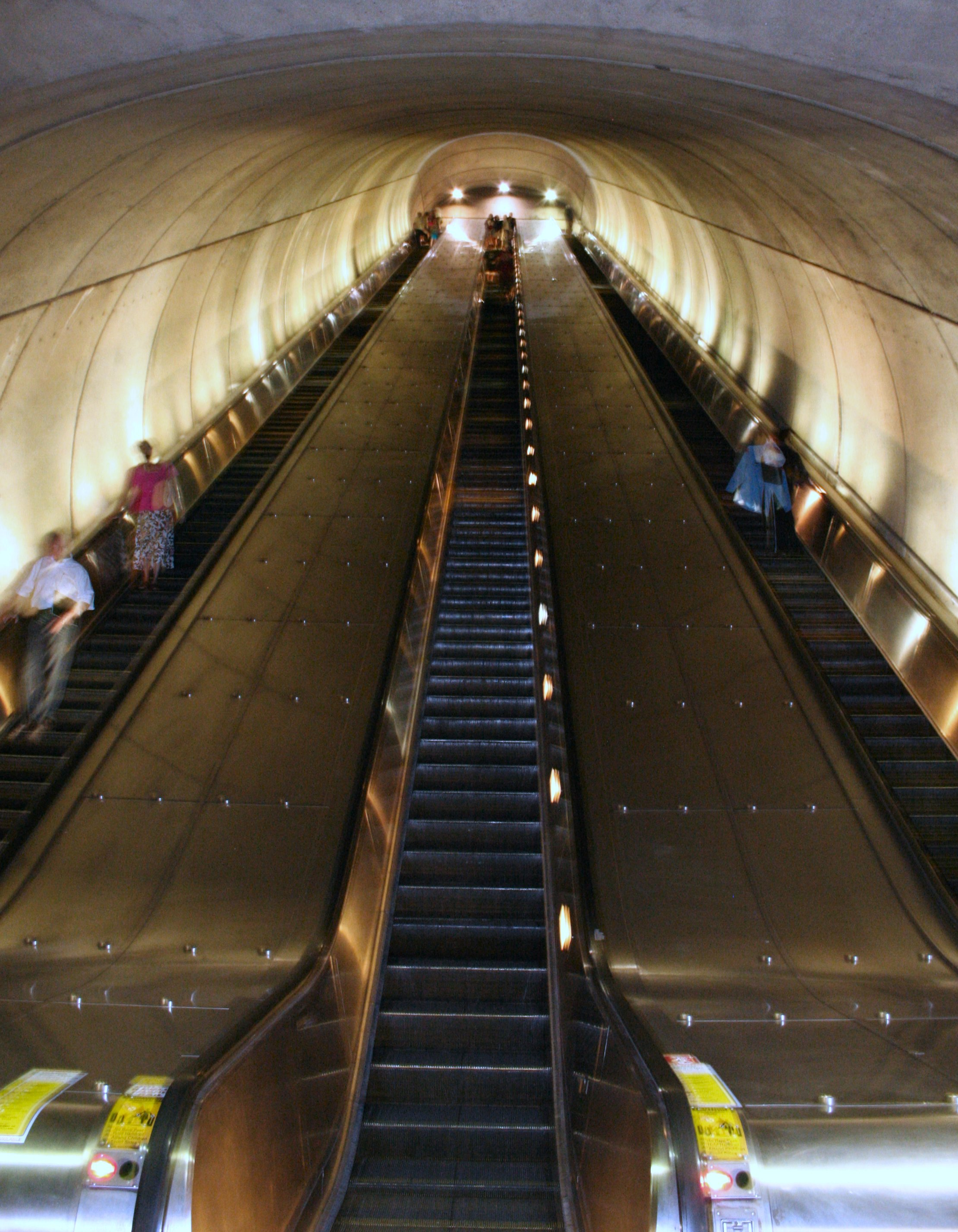
The main escalators

Woodley Park was the first in the system to deviate from the waffle-like coffers found at most underground stations in downtown Washington, instead using a simpler four-coffer arch. The advantage of the four-coffer arch was that it was pre-cast in Winchester, Virginia, and then hauled underground and installed on-site, while the waffle-style arches used in other stations had to be cast in place. This was done as a cost-saving measure.

Access to the station's mezzanine is provided by two sets of three escalators, connected by a short walkway just underneath street level. The entrance is located at the southwest corner of Connecticut Avenue and Woodley Road. An elevator connects to the street with the mezzanine, which contains fare control and access to the island platform. The station also has a knockout panel for an unbuilt pedestrian tunnel just below street level.

Like other stations on the Red Line constructed with rock-tunneling methods, it is rather deep, at 150 feet (46 m) below ground. After Forest Glen, it is the second deepest station in the system. The escalators have a vertical rise of 102 feet (31 m); they are the longest in the District of Columbia and the third longest on the Metrorail system (behind Wheaton and Bethesda).

== History ==
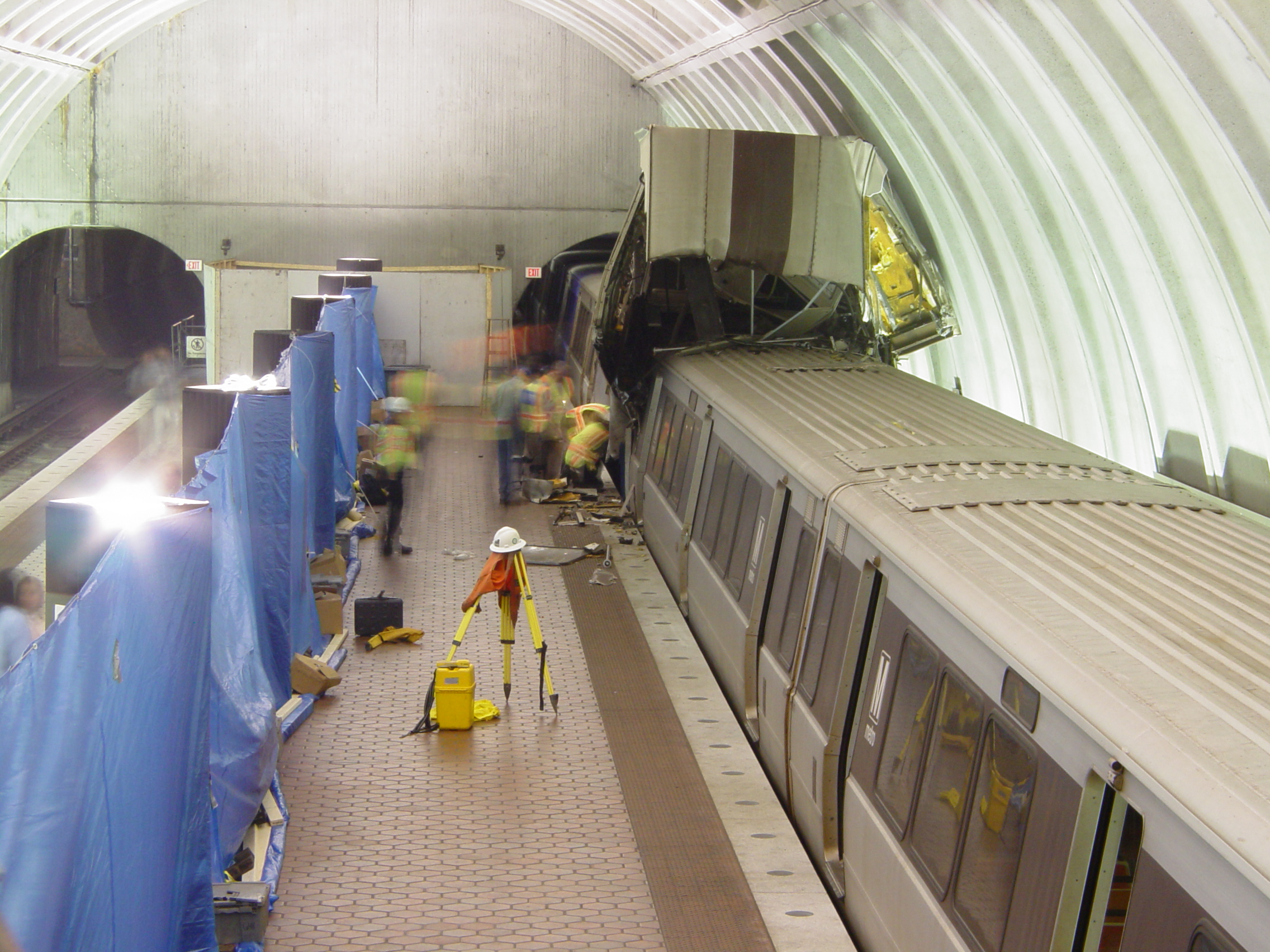
Cleanup after the November 3, 2004 accident

The station opened on December 5, 1981. Its opening coincided with the completion of 2.1 miles (3.4 km) of rail northwest of the Dupont Circle station and the opening of the Cleveland Park and Van Ness–UDC stations.

Originally known as simply "Zoological Park", in 1979 its name was changed to "Woodley Park–Zoo" because neighbors believed that the name was misleading, as the National Zoological Park is located 0.5 miles (0.8 km) from the station. The Adams Morgan neighborhood lies at the other end of the nearby Duke Ellington Bridge, and "Adams Morgan" was added to the station name in 1999 to reflect this. On November 3, 2011, the station was renamed to "Woodley Park", with "Zoo/Adams Morgan" as a subtitle.

On November 3, 2004, an out-of-service train rolled backwards into the station and collided with an in-service train. The non-fatal collision injured about 20 people and caused $3.5 million in damages. An investigation determined that the operator of the runaway train was likely asleep.

The original escalators were replaced in 2015–18.
