= Connecticut Avenue =

Thoroughfare in the District of Columbia and Maryland

- Connecticut Avenue NW
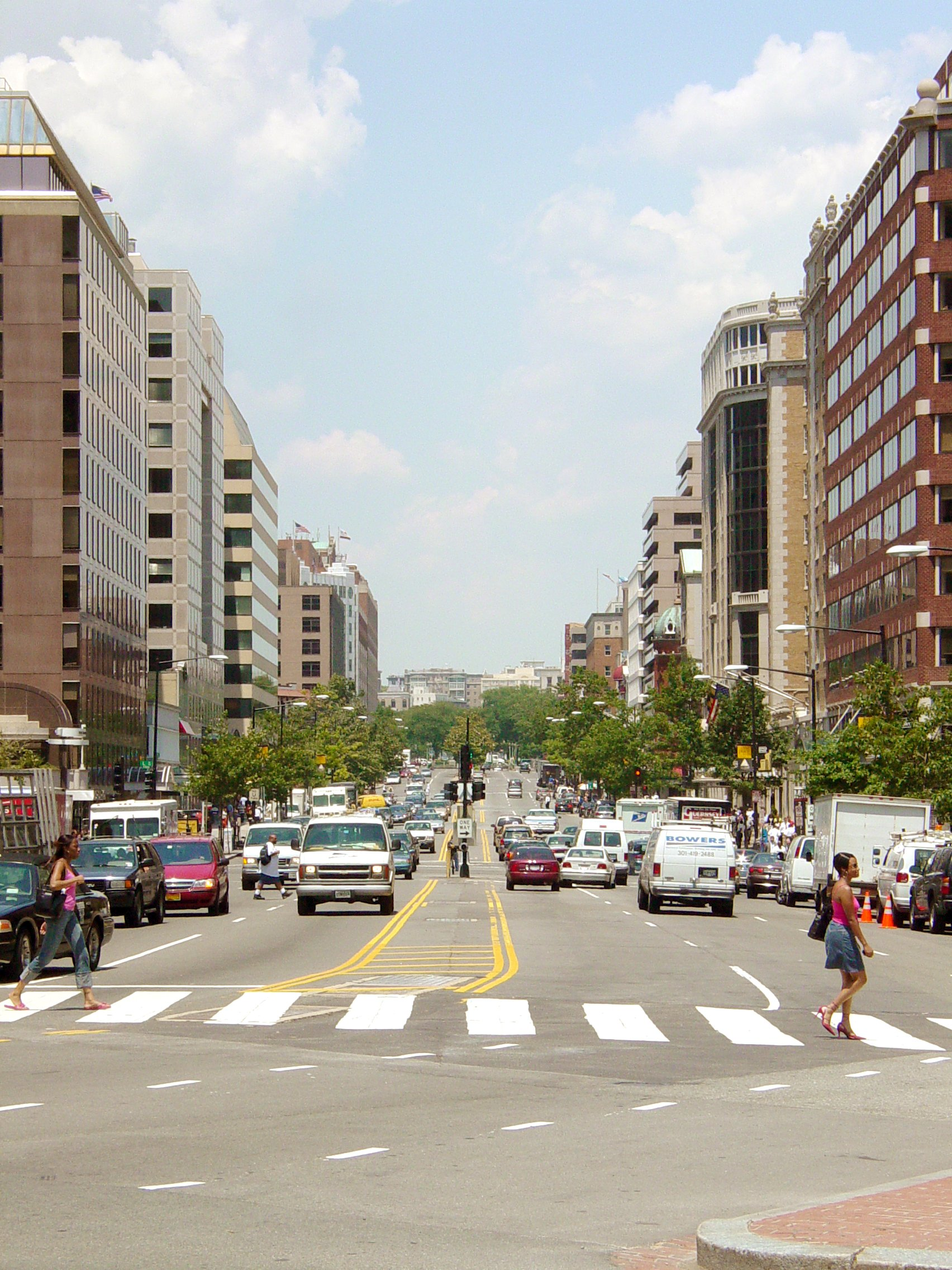
- Connecticut Avenue, looking north, from Farragut Square
- Interactive map of Connecticut Avenue
- Part of: MD 185 from the Chevy Chase Circle at the Washington, DC–Chevy Chase Village, MD line to MD 97 in Aspen Hill, MD
- Maintained by: DDOT and MDSHA
- Location: Washington, D.C. and Montgomery County, Maryland, United States
- South end: Lafayette Square in Washington, DC
- Major junctions: US 29 in Washington, DC; MD 410 in Chevy Chase, MD; I-495 in Chevy Chase, MD; MD 547 in Kensington, MD; MD 192 in Kensington, MD; MD 193 in Kensington, MD; MD 586 in Wheaton, MD; MD 97 in Aspen Hill, MD
- North end: Leisure World Boulevard in Leisure World, MD

Connecticut Avenue is a major thoroughfare in the Northwest quadrant of Washington, D.C., and suburban Montgomery County, Maryland. It is one of the diagonal avenues radiating from the White House. The segment south of Florida Avenue was one of the original streets in the 1791 L'Enfant Plan for the new capital city. The five-mile segment north of Rock Creek was built in the 1890s by a real-estate developer.

== History ==
Pierre L'Enfant conceived of Connecticut Avenue in his 1791 urban plan for the United States' new capital of Washington, D.C. The thoroughfare linked the proposed White House to Boundary Street, the city's northern limit, and ultimately beyond.

The avenue was first extended north from Rock Creek around 1890 as part of an audacious plan to create a streetcar suburb in present-day Chevy Chase, Maryland, several miles distant from the then-boundaries of Washington, D.C. The area northwest of today's Calvert Street NW was largely farmland when Francis Newlands, a sitting Congressman from Nevada, quietly acquired more than 1,700 acres in Northwest D.C. and Maryland along a five-mile stretch from today's Woodley Park neighborhood in D.C. to Jones Bridge Road in Maryland's Montgomery County. Meanwhile, he acquired control of the nascent Rock Creek Railway, which had a charter to build a streetcar line in the District. Beginning in 1888, Newlands and his partners graded a roadway, laid streetcar track down its center, and erected a bridge over a Rock Creek tributary. The road proceeded in a straight, 3.3-mile line north-northwest from today's Calvert Street to today's Chevy Chase Circle, then another 1.85 miles due north to Coquelin Run, yet another Rock Creek tributary near today's Chevy Chase Lake Drive. The streetcars began operating along the line's full length in 1892, connecting to their terminus at 18th and U Streets NW via the railway's iron trestle across the Rock Creek gorge.

In 1901, the National Bureau of Standards—today's National Institute for Standards and Technology—established its first campus just off Connecticut at present-day Van Ness Street NW.

In 1907, the Taft Bridge across Rock Creek connected the southern and northern segments of Connecticut Avenue. "The opening of Rock Creek Park in 1890 and later the Taft Bridge in 1907 made the avenue a vital commuter and leisure route, connecting downtown to the growing suburbs," the National Building Museum wrote.

In 1932, the Newlands bridge over the tributary was replaced by the current Klingle Valley Bridge.

In 2025, construction began on a deckover above the Connecticut Avenue underpass between Dupont Circle and Q Street, set to be completed in 2027.

== Route description ==
=== District of Columbia ===
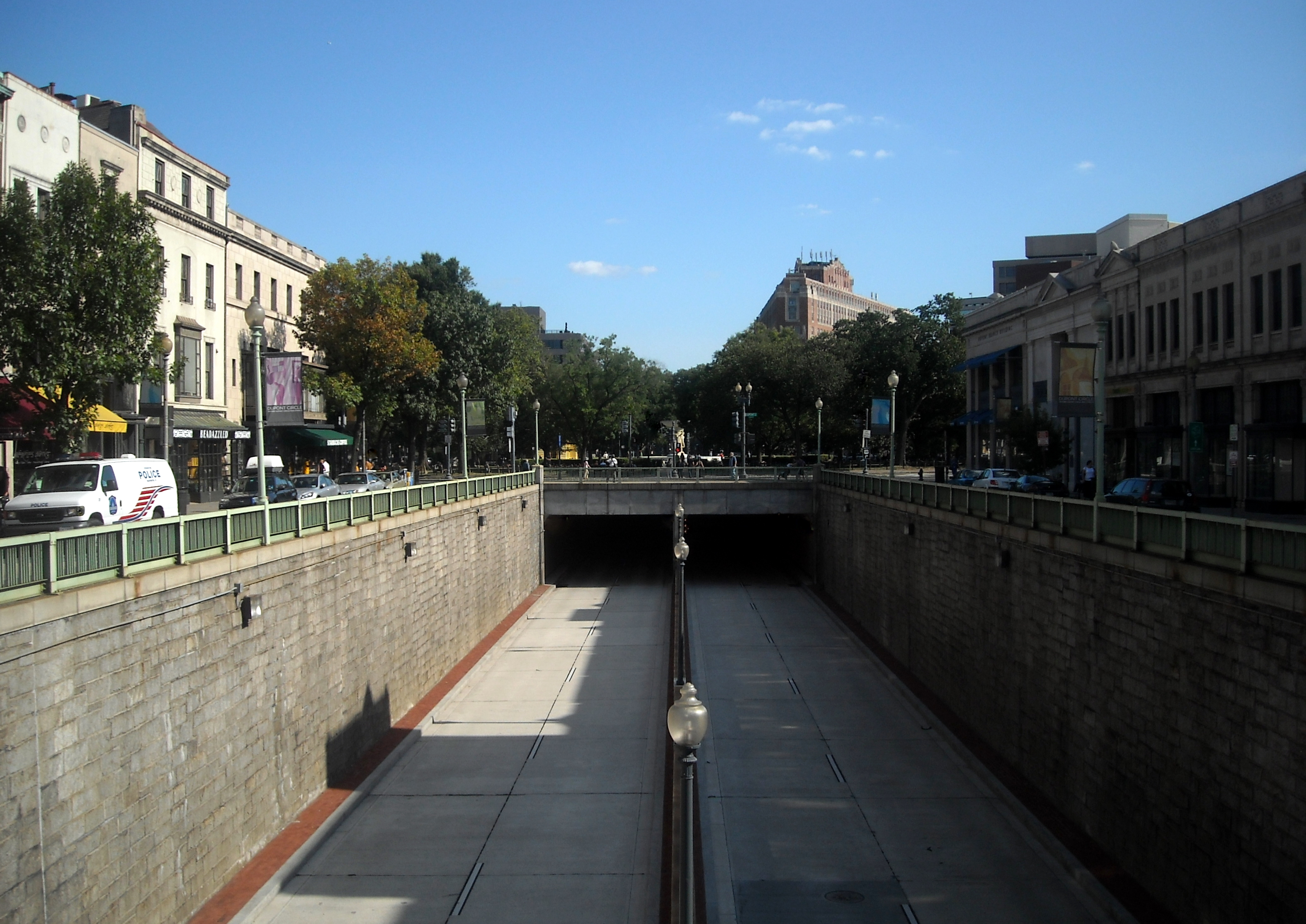
The Connecticut Avenue tunnel, which runs underneath Dupont Circle

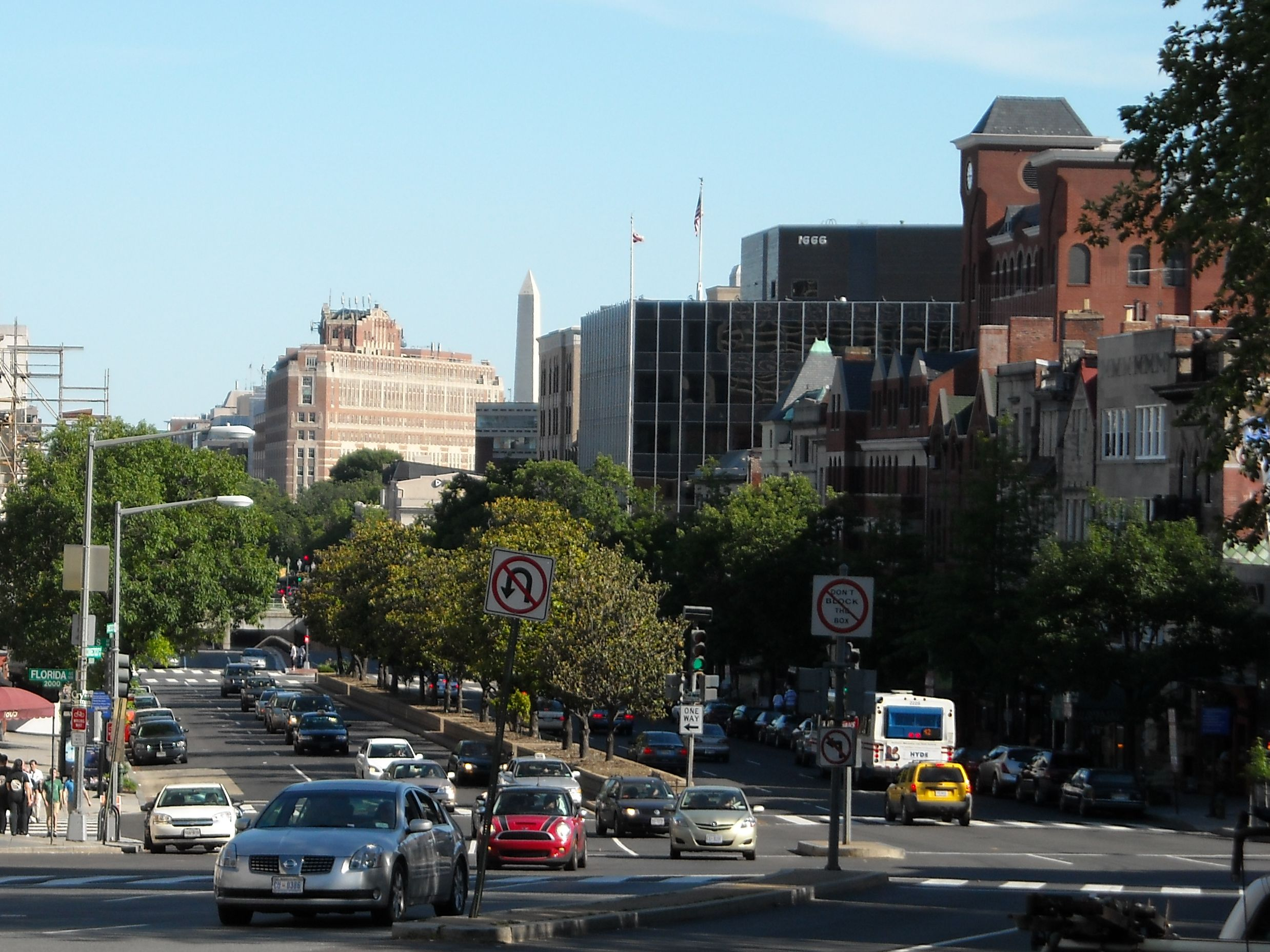
Connecticut Avenue near the intersection of Florida Avenue with the Washington Monument visible in the background

Connecticut Avenue begins just north of the White House at Lafayette Square. It is interrupted by Farragut Square. North of Farragut Square and K Street, Connecticut Avenue is one of the major streets in downtown Washington, with high-end restaurants, historical buildings such as Sedgwick Gardens, hotels, and shopping.

As Connecticut Avenue approaches the Dupont Circle neighborhood, it splits at N Street into a through roadway and service roadways. The through roadway tunnels under Dupont Circle, while the service roadways intersect the outer roadway of the circle. The through roadway and service roadways rejoin at R Street. Originally, there was no tunnel, and all vehicular traffic on Connecticut Avenue went through the circle. The tunnel was built in 1949 to serve vehicles and a Capital Transit streetcar line that operated until 1962.

After crossing Florida Avenue near the Hilton Washington hotel, Connecticut Avenue narrows and winds between the Kalorama neighborhoods. (The Kalorama Triangle Historic District extends eastward from Connecticut, while the Sheridan-Kalorama Historic District lies to the west.) The avenue then crosses Rock Creek Park on the William Howard Taft Bridge and goes through upper Northwest Washington, D.C., including the Woodley Park, Cleveland Park, Forest Hills, and Chevy Chase, D.C. neighborhoods. Between Woodley Park and Cleveland Park, Connecticut Avenue is carried over a deep valley on another bridge. Numerous older, Art Deco high-rise apartment buildings line the 3000 block, with slightly newer apartment buildings in the 4000 and 5000 blocks.

The National Zoological Park sits halfway between the Woodley Park-Zoo/Adams Morgan and Cleveland Park Metro stations. A bit further north is the strikingly futuristic former headquarters of Intelsat; a bit further south are the Omni Shoreham Hotel and the landmark Wardman Park Hotel building, once the city's largest hotel. This section is also a major commuter route; until 2020, it had reversible lanes along most of its length that operated during the morning and evening rush hours (7–9:30 a.m. and 4–6:30 p.m.). It connects with the Rock Creek and Potomac Parkway via 24th Street. Mid-century-era high-rise apartments line the avenue, with elegant, older detached homes on shady side streets.

The road passes the main campus of the University of the District of Columbia near the Van Ness metrorail station.

Connecticut Avenue is an arterial route in the National Highway System between K Street and Nebraska Avenue.

=== Maryland ===
Connecticut Avenue leaves the District of Columbia at Chevy Chase Circle, at the intersection of Connecticut and Western Avenues. Upon entering Maryland, it gains the route designation Maryland State Highway 185 and runs through the Chevy Chase, Maryland, postal area. This stretch is lined by the Chevy Chase Club, the former National 4-H Youth Conference Center, and Columbia Country Club.

After interchanging with the Capital Beltway at Exit 33, Connecticut Avenue enters Kensington, where it is the major north-south street of the central business district.

Connecticut Avenue long ended at University Boulevard (Maryland State Highway 193). Then Concord Avenue was extended northward to form an extension of Connecticut Avenue that passes through Wheaton and Aspen Hill. The state route designation ends at Georgia Avenue (Maryland State Highway 97). Connecticut Avenue, now simply a local street, continues past Georgia Avenue and ends at Leisure World Boulevard.

== Transit service ==
=== Former streetcar lines ===
For more than six decades, Connecticut Avenue was host to various streetcar lines. The first was the Connecticut Avenue and Park Railway (soon absorbed by the Metropolitan Railroad), which opened in April 1873 and ran from the White House to Boundary Avenue. In 1890, the Rock Creek Railway began operating from a terminus on Boundary Avenue two blocks east of Connecticut Avenue; after 1892, its streetcars ran across the Rock Creek gorge on an iron bridge near today's Duke Ellington Bridge, then turned north onto Connecticut near today's Calvert Street intersection. The line continued down the middle of Connecticut Avenue to Chevy Chase Circle, then ran on to its terminus at Chevy Chase Lake, an amusement park just south of today's Jones Bridge Road. A third streetcar line, the Chevy Chase Lake & Kensington Railway (later, the Kensington Railway Company) began operations in 1895, running north from Chevy Chase Lake on Connecticut Avenue for a half mile before diverging to the right and heading on to Kensington, Maryland. Streetcar operations on Connecticut north of Rock Creek ended in 1935; their service was replaced by buses. "It was the most significant District streetcar abandonment up to that time", The Washington Post would write.

=== Metrorail ===
The Red Line of the Washington Metro subway system runs beneath Connecticut Avenue. Metro stations along or near Connecticut Avenue include:

- Farragut West
  Blue Line
  Orange Line
  Silver Line
- Farragut North
  Red Line
- Dupont Circle
  Red Line
- Woodley Park
  Red Line
- Cleveland Park
  Red Line
- Van Ness-UDC
  Red Line

=== Metrobus ===
The following Metrobus routes travel along the street (listed from south to north):

- 42, 43 (Columbia Road to Farragut Square)
- N2, N4, N6 (southbound only, from Dupont Circle to Farragut Square)
- L1, L2 (Chevy Chase Circle to Farragut Square)
- H2 (Van Ness Street to Porter Street)
- L8 (Aspen Hill to Friendship Heights)

=== Ride On ===
The following Ride On routes travel along the street (listed from south to north):

- 1, 11 (East West Highway to Chevy Chase Circle)
- 34 (Bel Pre Road to Veirs Mill Road, and later University Boulevard to Knowles Avenue)
- 41 (Bel Pre Road to Weller Road)

=== MARC Train ===
The following MARC Train stop lies on the street:

- Kensington Station
  Brunswick Line
