= Dupont Circle station =

Washington Metro station

Dupont Circle
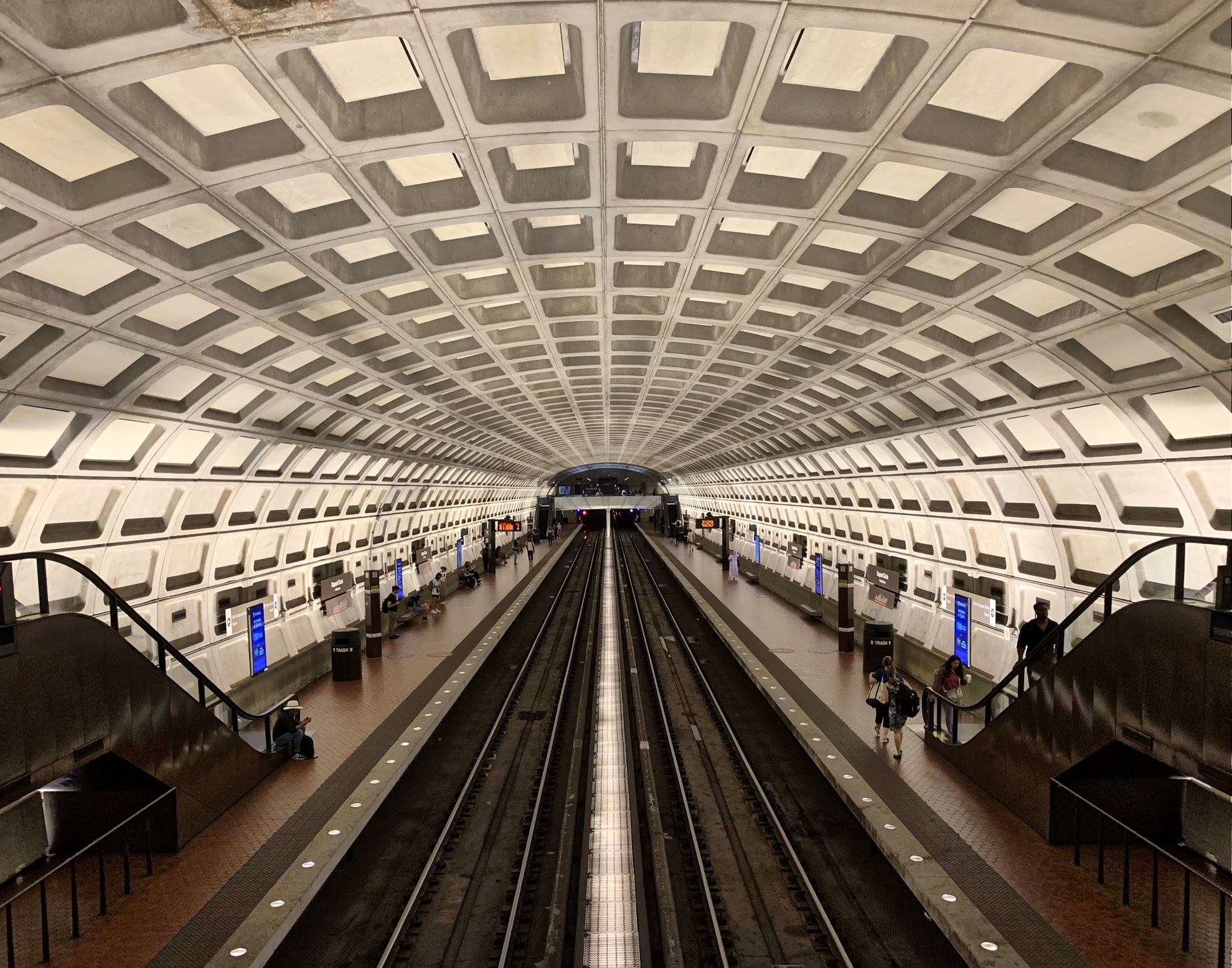
- Dupont Circle station in August 2023

General information
- Location: 1525 20th Street NW; Washington, D.C.
- Coordinates: 38.909499°N 77.04362°W
- Platforms: 2 side platforms
- Tracks: 2
- Connections: Metrobus: C91, D74, D90, D94, D96; Georgetown University Shuttle

Construction
- Structure type: Underground
- Cycle facilities: Capital Bikeshare, 16 racks and 12 lockers
- Accessible: Yes

Other information
- Station code: A03

History
- Opened: January 17, 1977

Passengers
- 2025: 12,021 (average weekday)
- Rank: 9 of 98

Services
Preceding station	Washington Metro	Following station
Woodley Park toward Shady Grove	Red Line	Farragut North toward Glenmont
Route map
Location

Dupont Circle station is an underground rapid transit station on the Red Line of the Washington Metro in Washington, D.C. Located below the traffic circle, it is one of the busiest stations in the Metro system, with an average of 16,948 entries each weekday. The station parallels Connecticut Avenue NW between the southern edge of the circle to the south and Q Street NW to the north.

== Station layout ==
Dupont Circle station has two tracks with side platforms, one of the only Red Line stations with this setup. This single-bore layout is required by its deep passage beneath the Connecticut Avenue NW underpass and an abandoned streetcar tunnel, now used as an art space. The station's depth required construction using rock-tunneling methods.

There are two entrances to the station. The north entrance, on the southeast corner of Q Street NW and 20th Street NW contains a set of three escalators and an elevator to reach a mezzanine and fare control at the north end of the station. Unique to the station, the edges of the escalators are trellised with plants where normally there would be granite slabs. The south entrance, located on the southern edge of Dupont Circle at 19th Street NW and Connecticut Avenue NW, has another set of three escalators to reach a separate mezzanine and fare control at the south end of the platforms. The station's north entrance escalators are 188 feet (57 m) long. Its south entrance escalators are 170 feet (52 m) long and rise 85 feet (26 m).

== History ==
Dupont Circle station opened on January 17, 1977, the first to open after the original stretch of the Red Line between Union Station and Farragut North. It remained the western terminus of the Red Line until December 5, 1981, upon the extension of the line to Van Ness–UDC.

On May 6, 2000, a woman fell between the tracks but was unharmed as the train passed over her. The station was temporarily closed and the woman was extracted from under the train as power had been shut off. In May 2006, a Metro employee died after being struck by a train in the station.

In 2007, a portion of Walt Whitman's 1865 poem The Wound Dresser was inscribed into the granite wall around the north entrance escalators to honor the city's caregivers during the HIV crisis.

Thus in silence in dreams’ projections,

Returning, resuming, I thread my way through the hospitals, The hurt and wounded I pacify with soothing hand, I sit by the restless all the dark night, some are so young,

Some suffer so much, I recall the experience sweet and sad,

— Walt Whitman, The Wound-Dresser (1865)

The south entrance was closed from February 1 to October 21, 2012, to replace all three escalators, deemed among the system's least reliable.

On January 15, 2018, a train headed to Glenmont derailed outside the station. Nobody was seriously hurt.

In 2019, Metro repaired the station chiller, which had been out of service for almost 4 years.

In April 2019, construction began on a station canopy for the north entrance, identical to other canopies across the system. Construction was set to be completed in summer 2022. However, construction was delayed due to the contractor that was supposed to provide the custom glass panels going bankrupt.

During the afternoon of December 10, 2019, smoke was reported from an arcing insulator at Woodley Park station causing service to be suspended between Dupont Circle and Van Ness–UDC. Red Line trains were later forced to single track between Friendship Heights and Van Ness due to another arcing insulator failure.

== Gallery ==
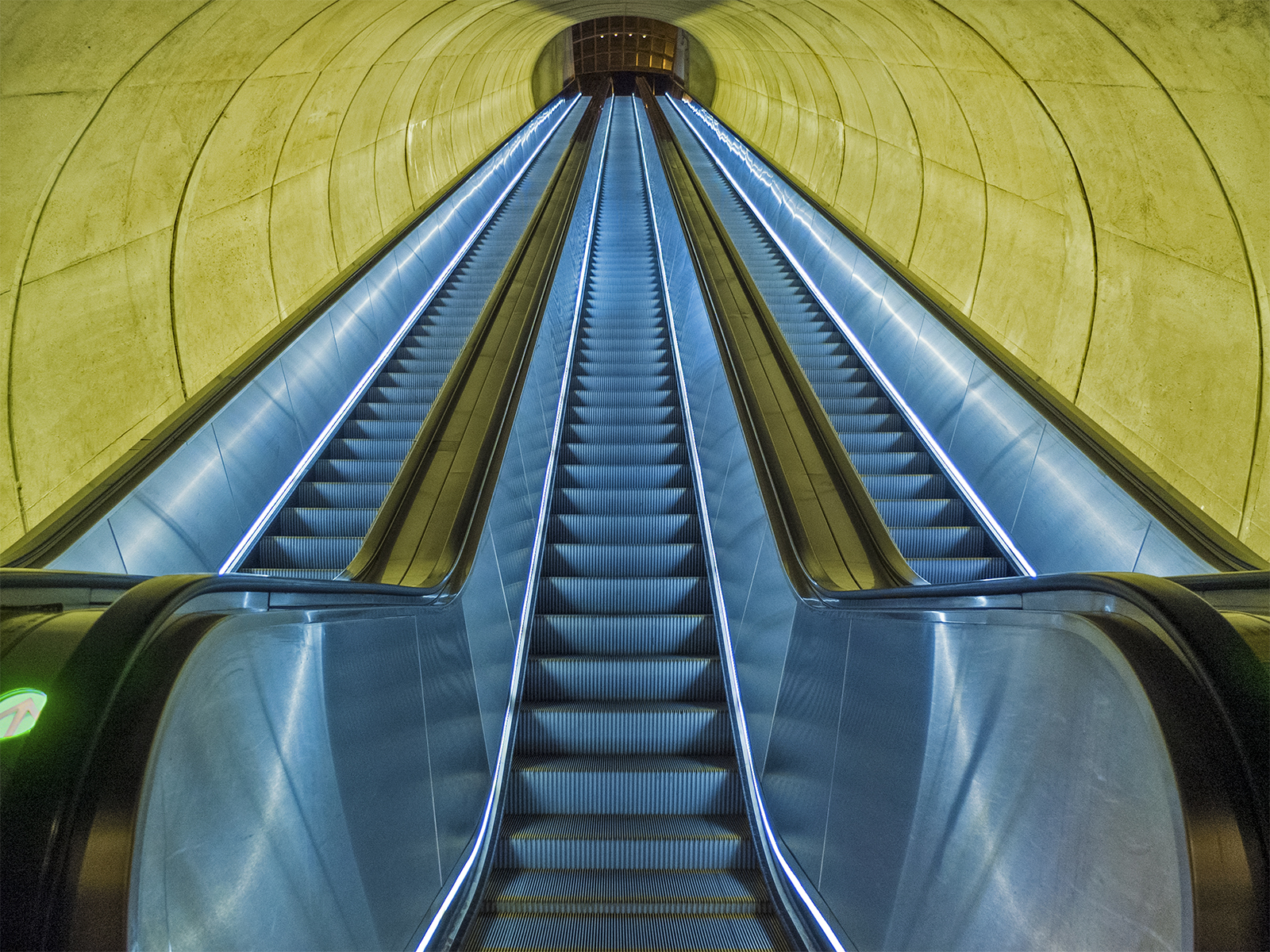
South entrance escalators

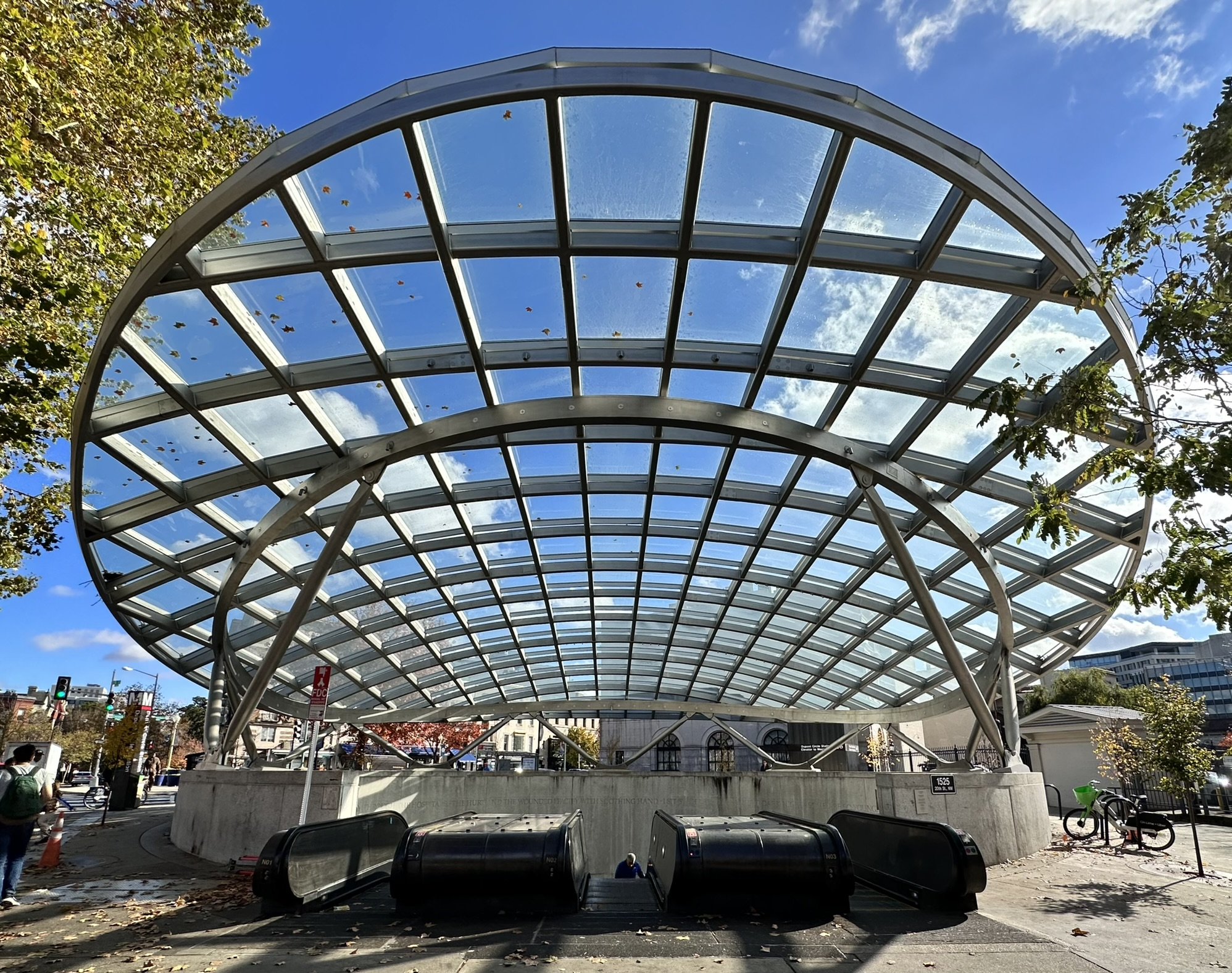
Canopy over the north entrance

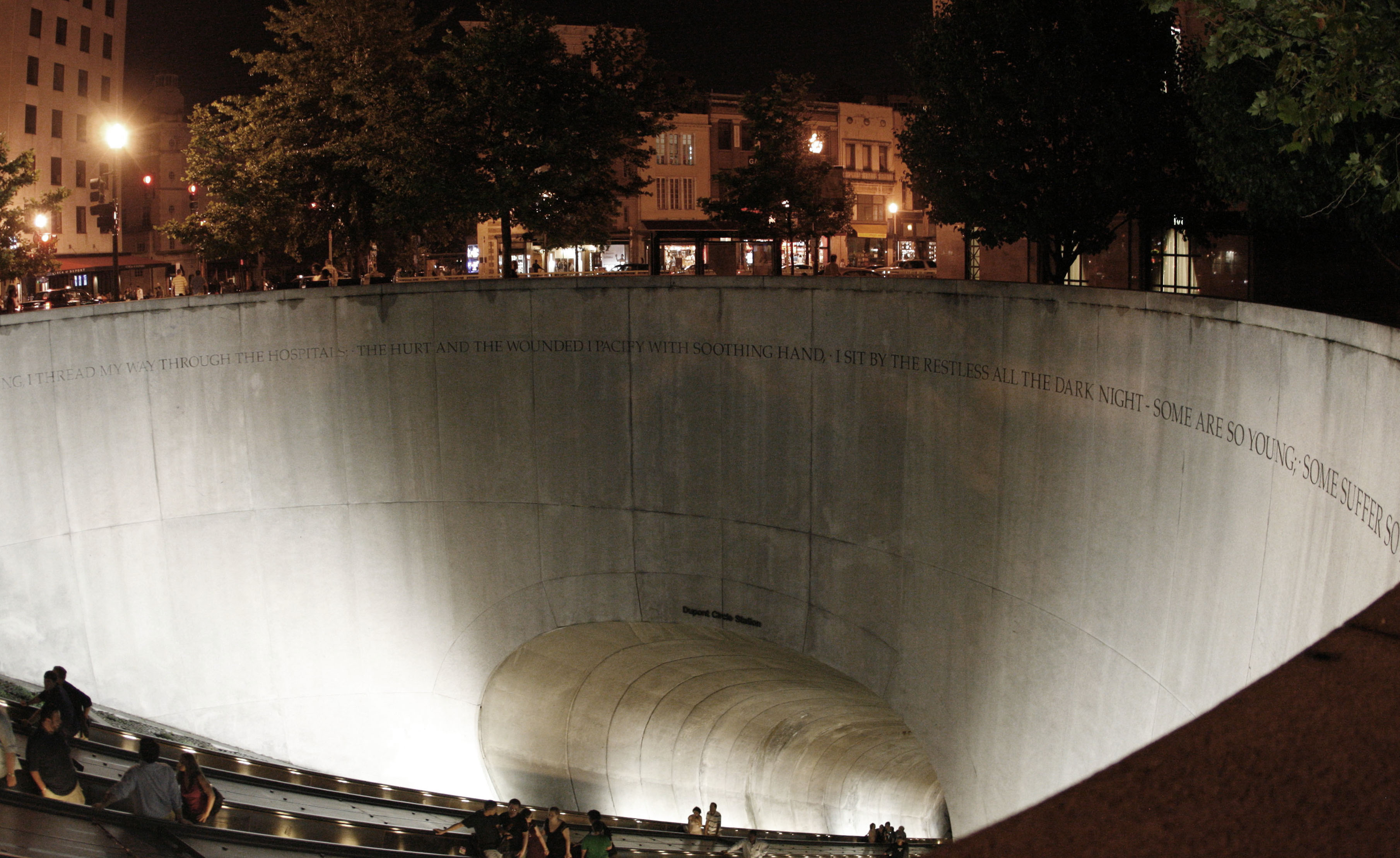
North entrance inscribed with Walt Whitman's poem.
