= Forest Hills (Washington, D.C.) =

Forest Hills (Van Ness)
- Neighborhood of Washington, D.C.
- Forest Hills
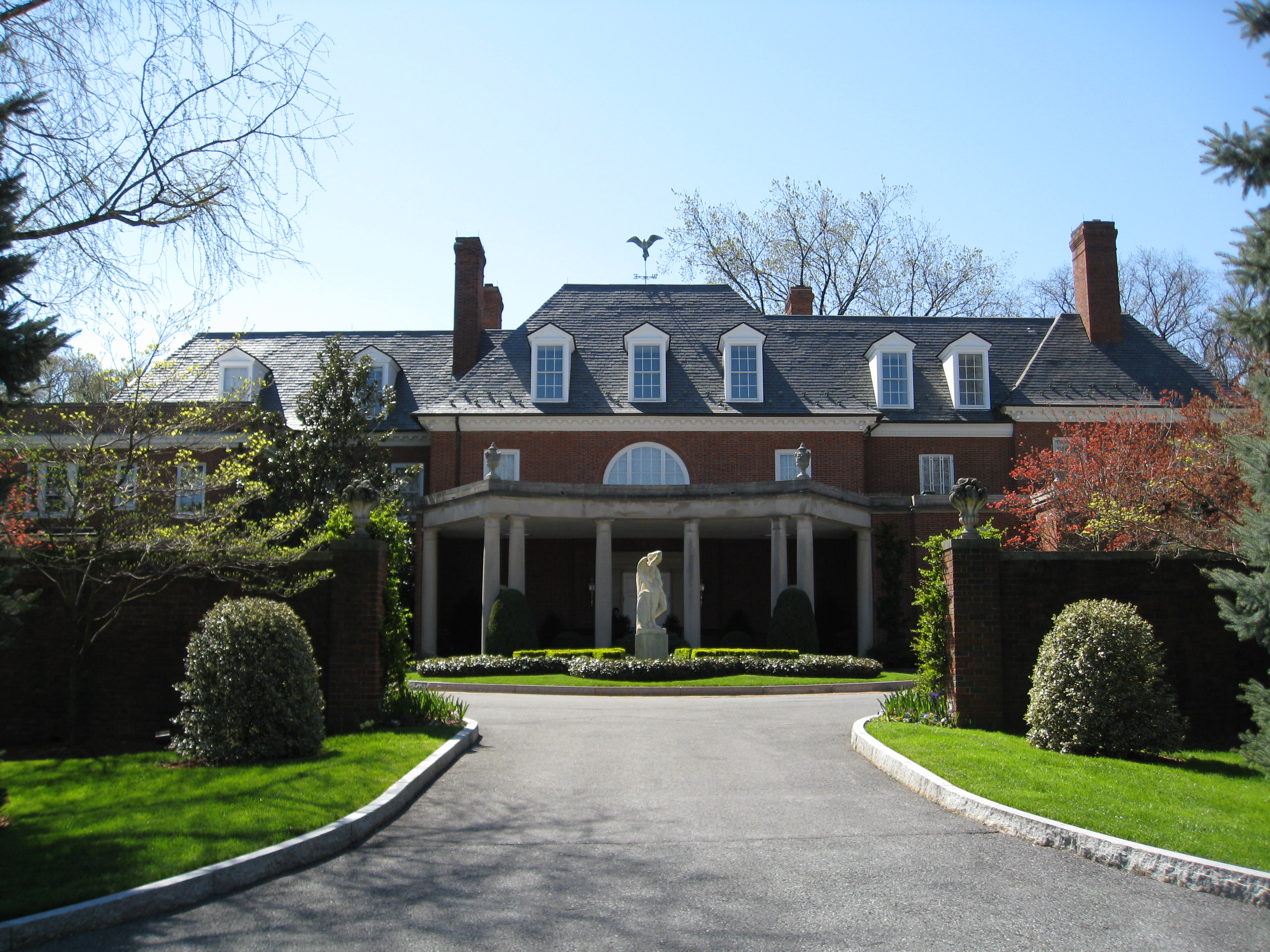
- Hillwood Estate, Museum & Gardens (2009)

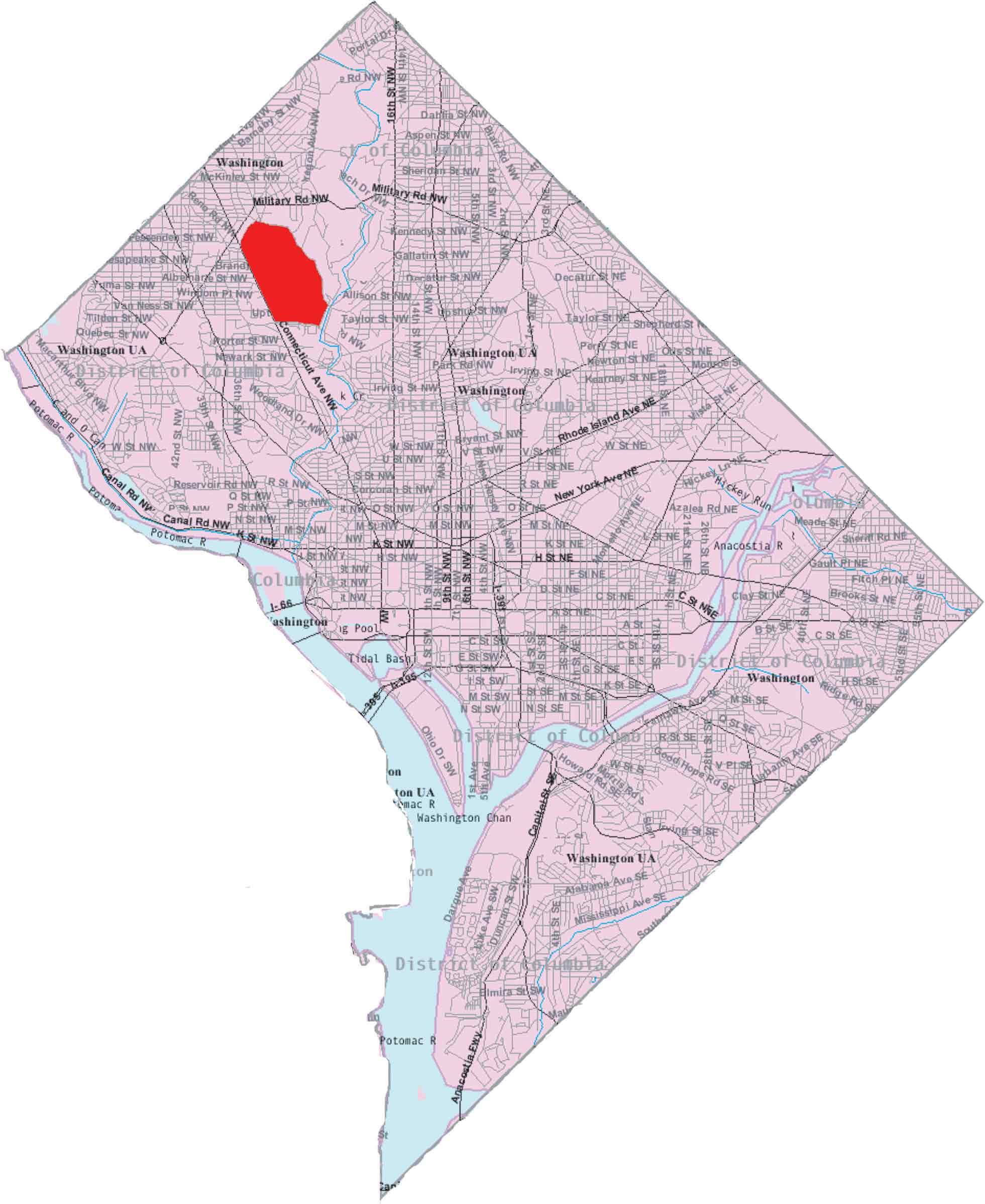
- Map of Washington, D.C., with Forest Hills highlighted in red
- Coordinates: 38.9505°N 77.058°W
- Country: United States
- District: Washington, D.C.
- Ward: Ward 3

Government
  - Councilmember: Matthew Frumin
- Postal code: ZIP code

Forest Hills, also known as Van Ness, is a residential neighborhood in the northwest quadrant of Washington, D.C., United States, bounded by Connecticut Avenue NW to the west, Rock Creek Park to the east, Chevy Chase to the north, and Tilden Street NW to the south. The neighborhood is frequently referred to as Van Ness because it is served by the Van Ness–UDC station on the Washington Metro's Red Line and is near the Van Ness campus of the University of the District of Columbia (UDC).

== Transit ==
Forest Hills is served by the Red Line of the Washington Metro at Van Ness-UDC station and via Metrobus routes D70, D72, and C87.

== Points of interest ==
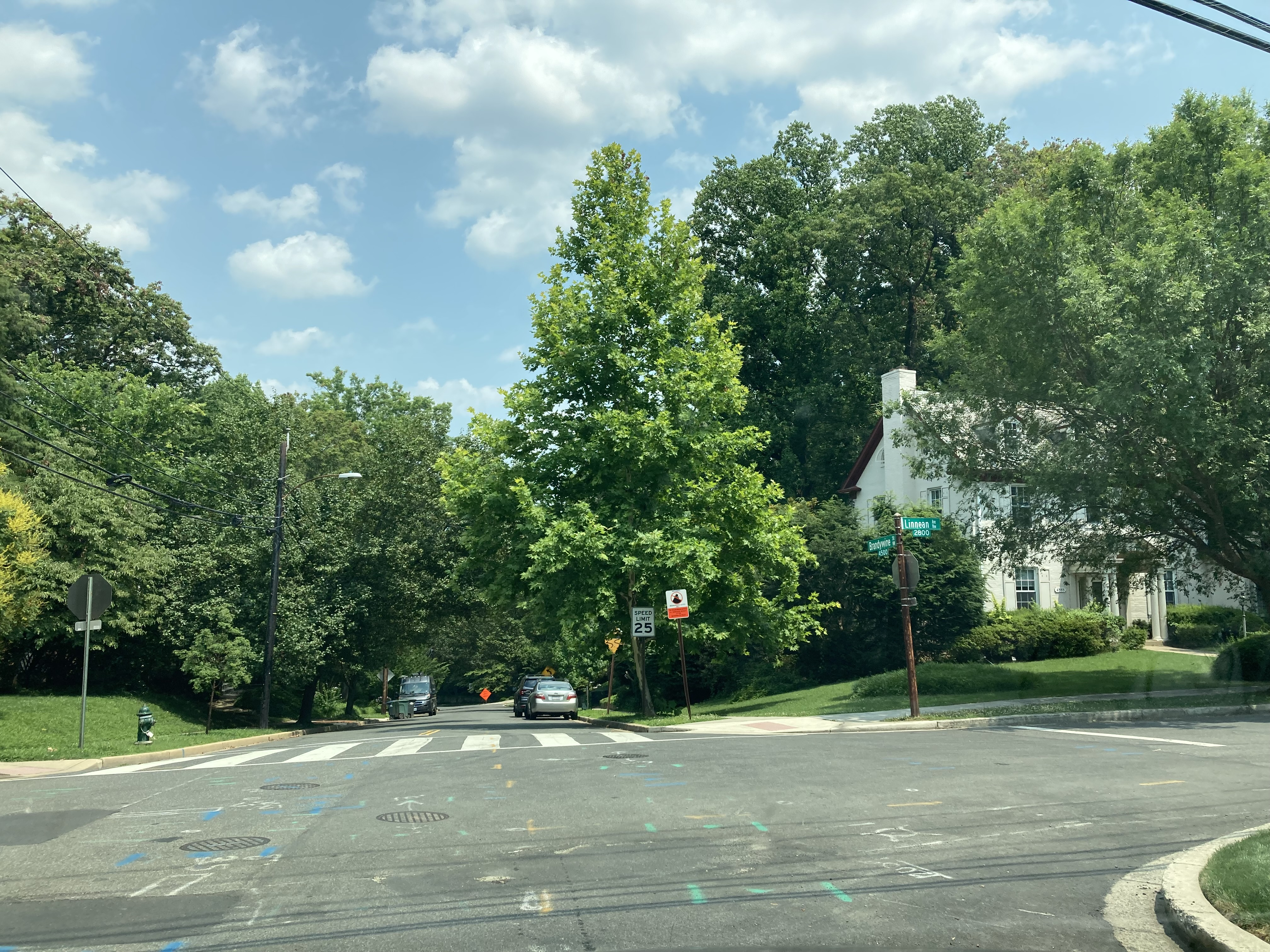
Intersection of Brandywine St. and Linnean Ave. NW, July 2021, in Forest Hills

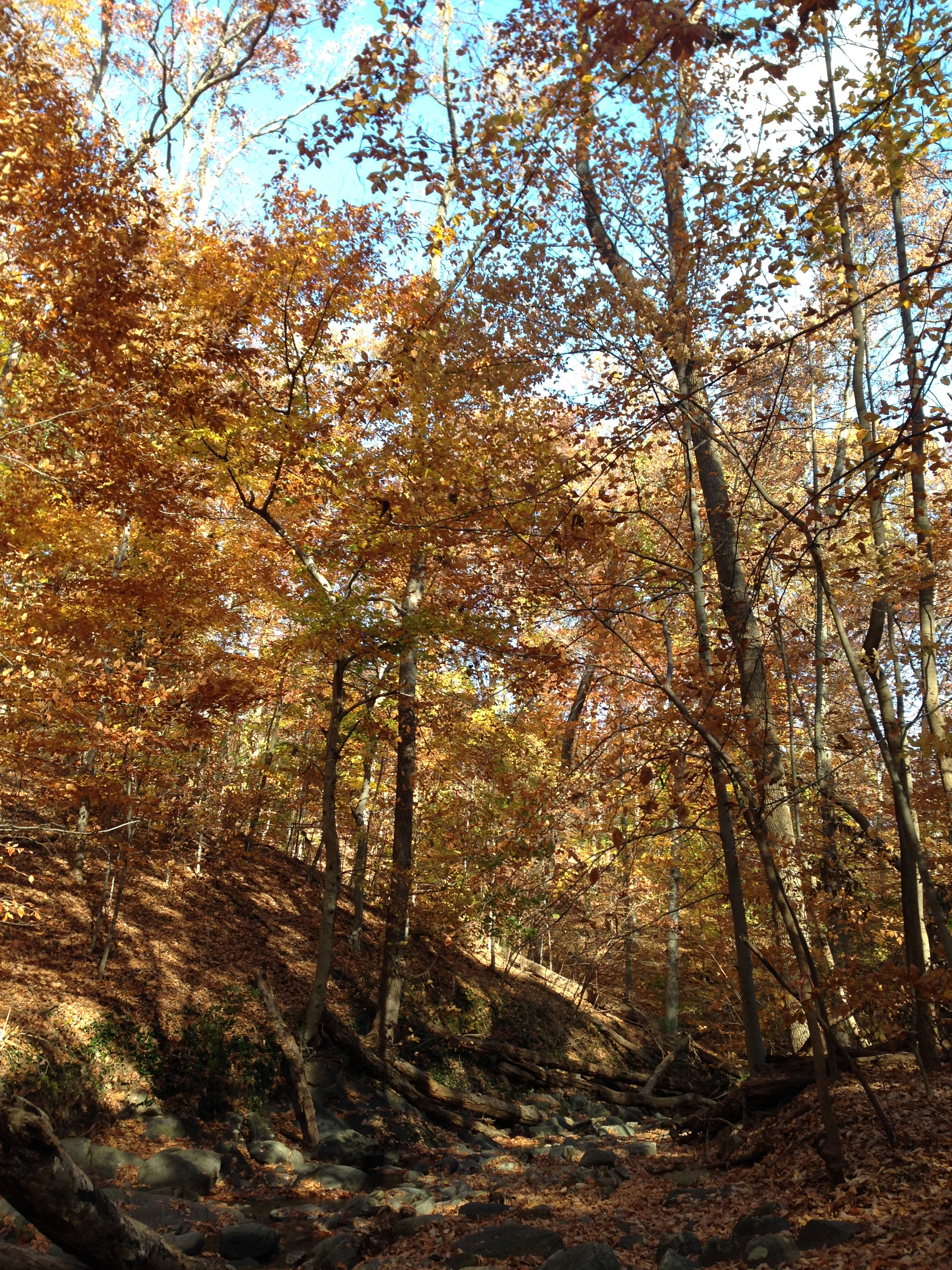
Soapstone Valley, which is part of Rock Creek Park.

Forest Hills contains the former site of the Civil War-era Fort Kearny, of which no trace remains today, and the Soapstone Valley Park, which surrounds a tributary of Rock Creek.

The Howard University School of Law campus is across Connecticut Avenue from UDC on Upton Street NW. The Levine School of Music is located on Upton Street, in the building originally occupied by the Carnegie Geophysical Laboratory. The Edmund Burke School, founded in 1968, is located on Upton Street, in the building that was originally occupied by Devitt Prep.

The Hillwood Museum, located in a house that once belonged to philanthropist and socialite Marjorie Merriweather Post, contains her collection of decorative objects, including several Fabergé eggs.

The embassies of the Czech Republic and the Netherlands are located on Linnean Avenue NW in Forest Hills, while that of Suriname is on Connecticut Avenue. The embassy of Hungary is just south of Tilden Street in Cleveland Park, and a number of other embassies are located just to the west in North Cleveland Park.

The Seventh-day Adventist Capital Memorial Church is located at 3150 Chesapeake Street NW.

== History ==
The National Bureau of Standards (now the National Institute of Standards and Technology) was at one time the largest employer in the neighborhood.

Due to an absence of restricted housing covenants as in other, similarly situated neighborhoods, the Forest Hills neighborhood became predominantly Jewish during the 1940s and 1950s.
