= McCormick House (Washington, D.C.) =

- U.S. Historic district – Contributing property
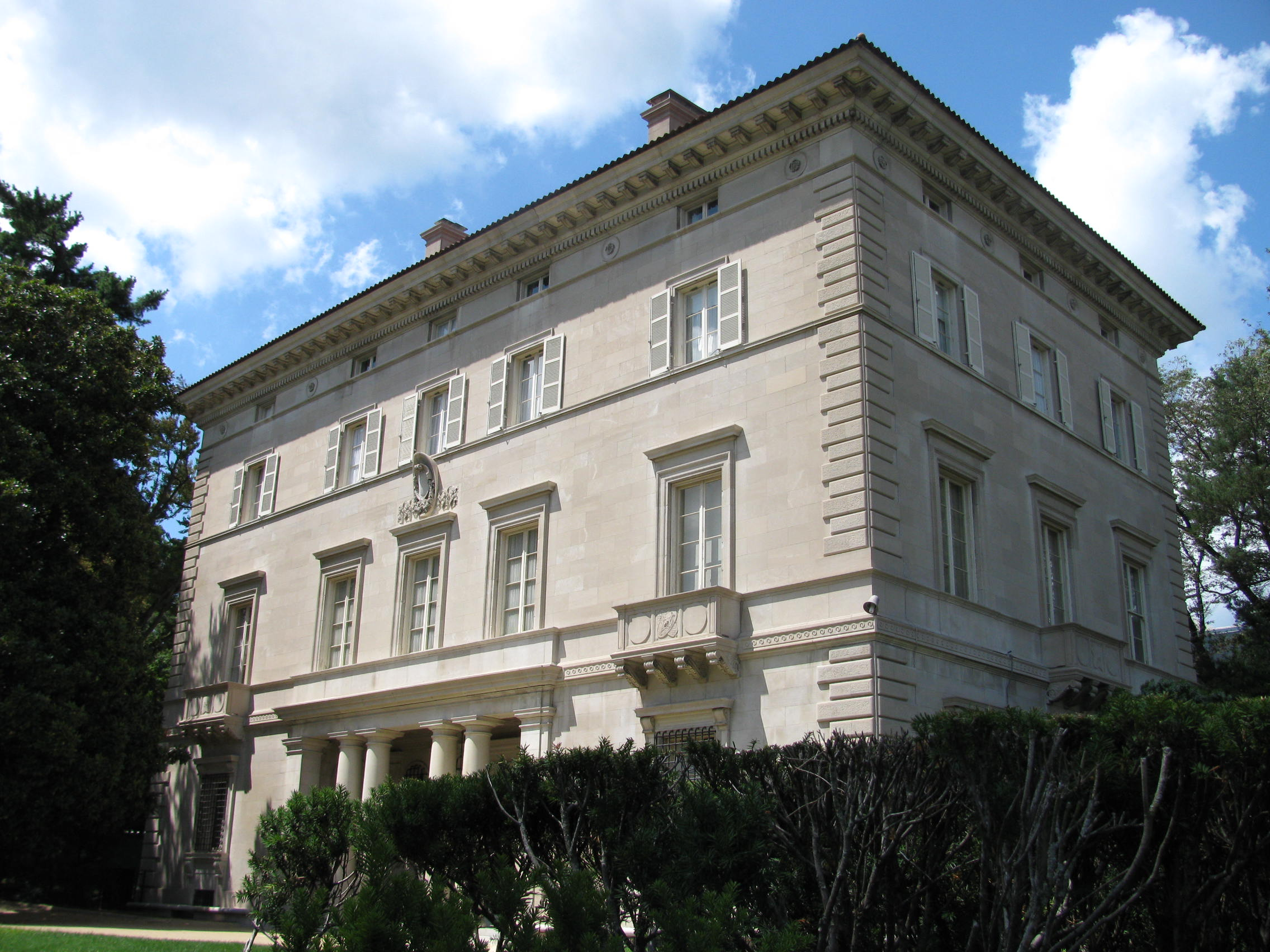
- Location: 3000 Massachusetts Avenue, N.W. Washington, D.C.
- Coordinates: 38°55′7.27″N 77°3′36.88″W
- Built: 1928–1931
- Architect: John Russell Pope (1874–1937)
- Architectural style: Neoclassical
- Part of: Massachusetts Avenue Historic District (ID74002166)
- Designated CP: November 26, 1973

McCormick House is the current residence of the Brazilian ambassador to the United States. It is located at 3000 Massachusetts Avenue, Northwest, Washington, D.C. in the Embassy Row neighborhood.

== History ==
The design of the house was first commissioned in 1908 to well known American architect John Russell Pope (1874–1937) by diplomat Robert Sanderson McCormick (1849–1919) and wife, Katherine Etta ("Kate") Medill McCormick (1853–1932). Both Robert and Katherine hailed from well-heeled backgrounds, being members of a Nouveau riche class of nineteenth century Americans that came into sudden wealth as the nation industrialized. Married to Robert in 1876, Katherine hailed from a prominent Chicago family which included her father Joseph Medill (1823–1899), the co-owner of the "Chicago Tribune" and one-term mayor of Chicago following the Great fire of 1871. The McCormick side of the future McCormick-Medill publishing dynasty came into money through the business successes of Robert's father Cyrus McCormick, the inventor of the revolutionary McCormick reaper machine which transformed American and world agriculture.

The McCormick – Pope mansion was not completed until 1931, 23 years after the commencement of construction.

The Brazilian embassy purchased the Neoclassical architectural style home in 1934, three years after it was completed, for two hundred thousand dollars ($200,000). Brazil was the second nation after the United Kingdom to have an embassy on what is today Embassy Row. In 1971, a new chancery was constructed next door. The very modernist mirrored glass walled structure was designed by famous Brazilian architect Olavo Redig de Campos (1906–1984).

== See also ==
- McCormick Mansion
