= Embassy of Brazil, Washington, D.C. =

Embassy of Brazil in Washington, D.C.
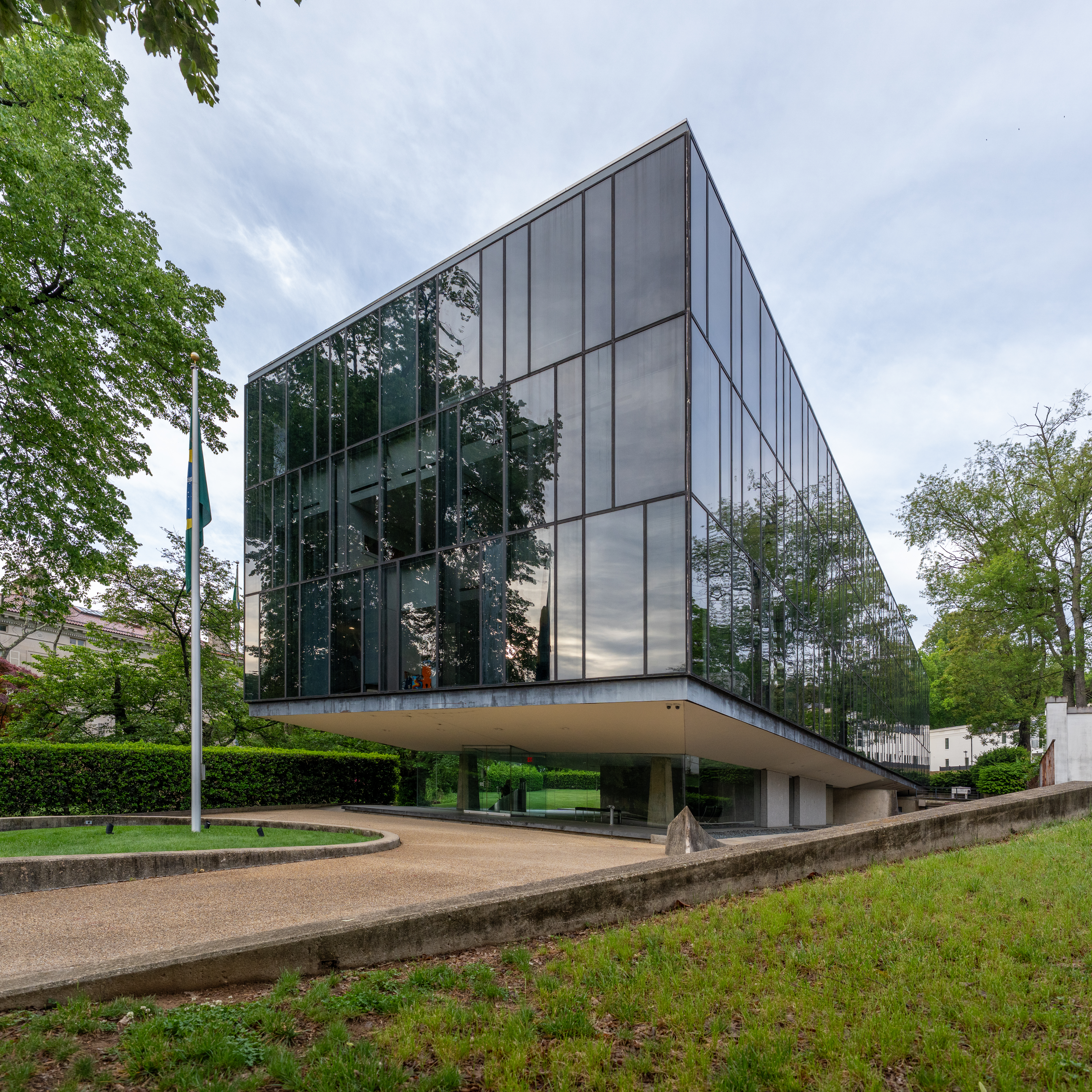
- Location: Washington, D.C.
- Address: 3006 Massachusetts Avenue, NW
- Coordinates: 38°55′9.12″N 77°3′37.08″W
- Website: http://washington.itamaraty.gov.br/en-us/

The Embassy of Brazil in Washington, D.C. is the diplomatic mission of the Federative Republic of Brazil to the United States of America.

The Chancery (offices) of the Embassy is located at 3006 Massachusetts Avenue N.W., Washington, D.C., in the famous Embassy Row neighborhood.

== History ==
In 1824, the United States was the second country to recognize Brazil's independence from Portugal, after Argentina recognized Brazil's independence in the previous year. The diplomatic relations between the United States and the Empire of Brazil was established on May 26, 1824, when the Brazilian Chargé d'Affaires José Silvestre Rebello presented his diplomatic credentials at the newly restored White House to fifth President James Monroe (1758-1831, served 1817-1825). Brazil's first legation was thus established in Washington, D.C., a quarter-century after the founding of the American capital city on the Potomac River. The Brazilian legation was replaced by an embassy in 1905.

This campaign for liberation led with similar independence for Brazil with its crown prince and heir to the Portuguese throne who had resided for some time in South America, declaring independence from the mother country of the former unified trans-oceanic United Kingdom of Portugal, Brazil and Algarves in 1822. The heir became Emperor Dom Pedro I of the new Empire of Brazil, which lasted until 1889, then becoming a federation republic.

In 1905, the U.S. legation in the then Brazilian coastal capital city of Rio de Janeiro representing the United States and its Department of State under 26th President Theodore Roosevelt was raised to a full embassy as was the trend with other international diplomatic missions.

The embassy had several homes in the federal District of Columbia until, in 1934, it purchased McCormick House, a large manor on Massachusetts Avenue, N.W. just down the street from the new British Embassy. The Brazilians were the second nation to have an embassy on what is today called the Embassy Row neighborhood. The manor today remains the ambassadorial residence. In 1971, a new chancery in America was constructed next door to McCormick House. The modernist mirrored glass wall structure was designed by famous Brazilian architect Olavo Redig de Campos (1906-1984). An extensive renovation of the Chancery of the Embassy ended forty years later in 2011.

== Consular services ==
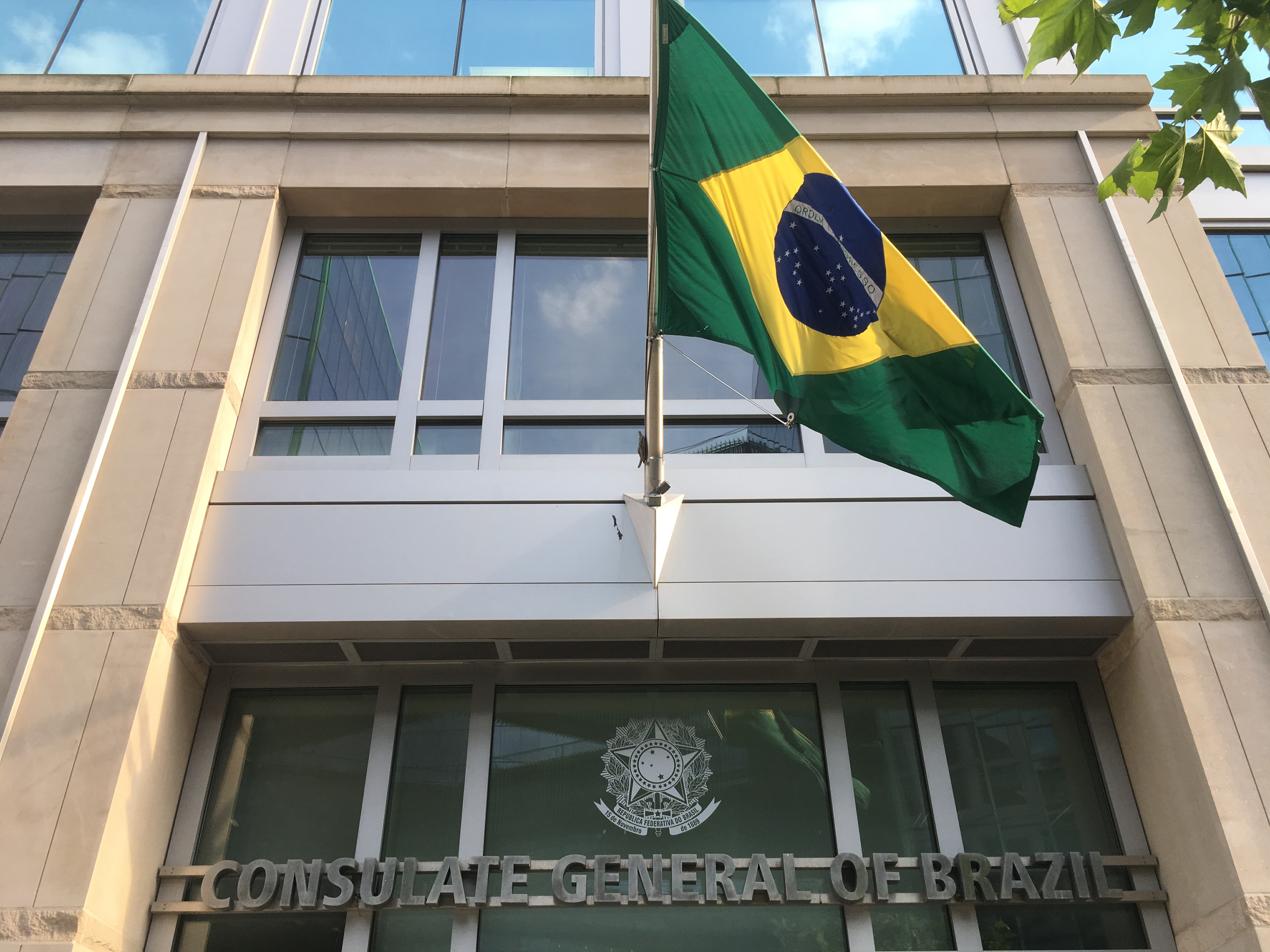
In the national capital and federal district of the United States, in Washington, D.C., the Consulate General of Brazil offices since 2008 are located at 1030 15th Street, N.W.

The embassy itself ceased to have consular responsibilities since the creation, in 2008, of the Consulate-General of Brazil, also in Washington, D.C., located at 1030 15th Street, N.W. It is the tenth consulate general office in the US, with assigned geographical regions to each.

== Brazilian consulates in the United States ==
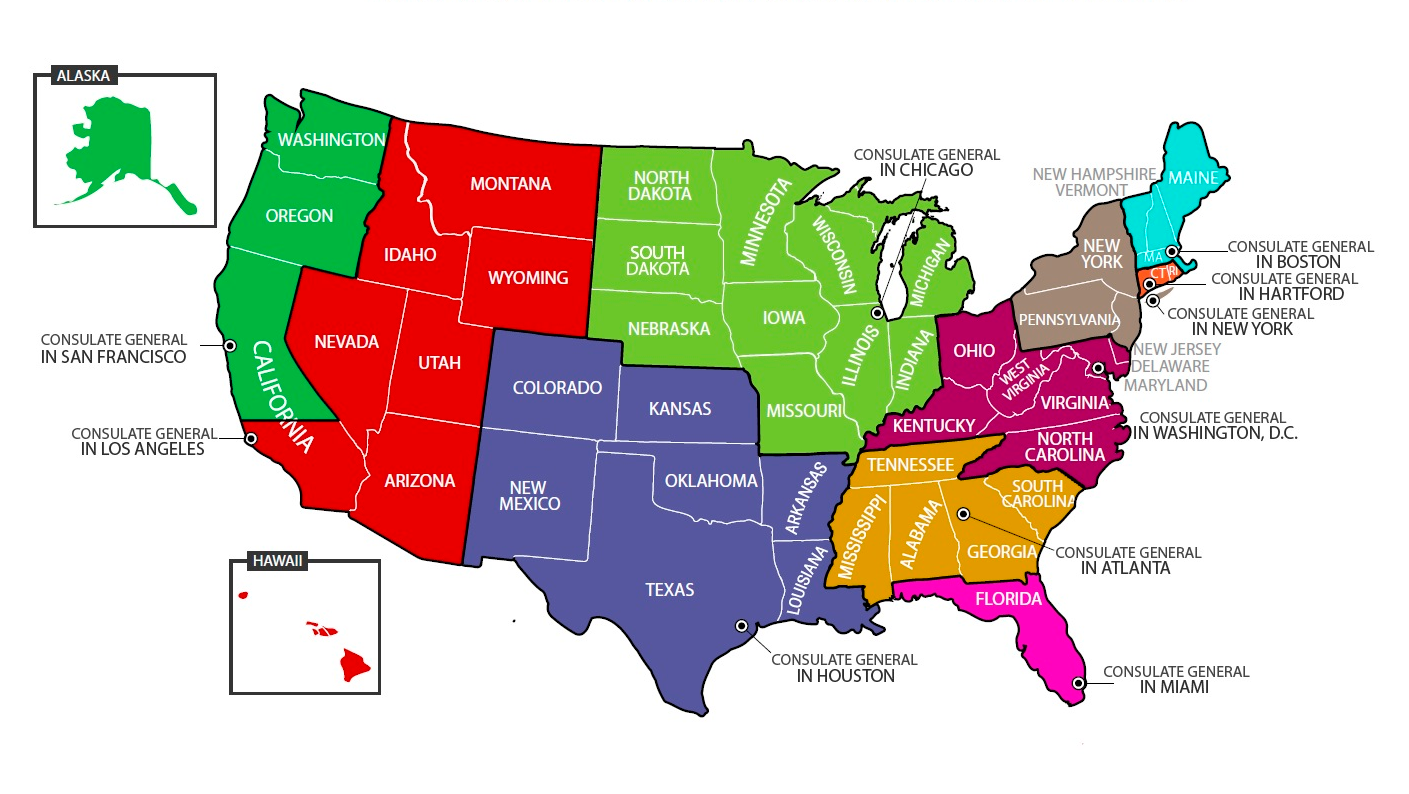
Brazilian Consulates in the United States

Brazil has established ten Consulate Generals in the United States. Each Consulate has its jurisdiction, which covers different areas of the country. The existing Consulates are:

- The Consulate General of Brazil in Atlanta
- The Consulate General of Brazil in Boston
- The Consulate General of Brazil in Chicago
- The Consulate General of Brazil in Hartford, Connecticut
- The Consulate General of Brazil in Los Angeles
- The Consulate General of Brazil in Miami
- The Consulate General of Brazil in New York
- The Consulate General of Brazil in San Francisco
- The Consulate General of Brazil in Houston
- The Consulate General of Brazil in Washington, DC

== See also ==
- Brazilian Ambassador to the United States
- Brazilian diplomatic missions
- Brazil – United States relations
