= Woodland Normanstone =

Woodland-Normanstone
- Neighborhood of Washington, D.C.
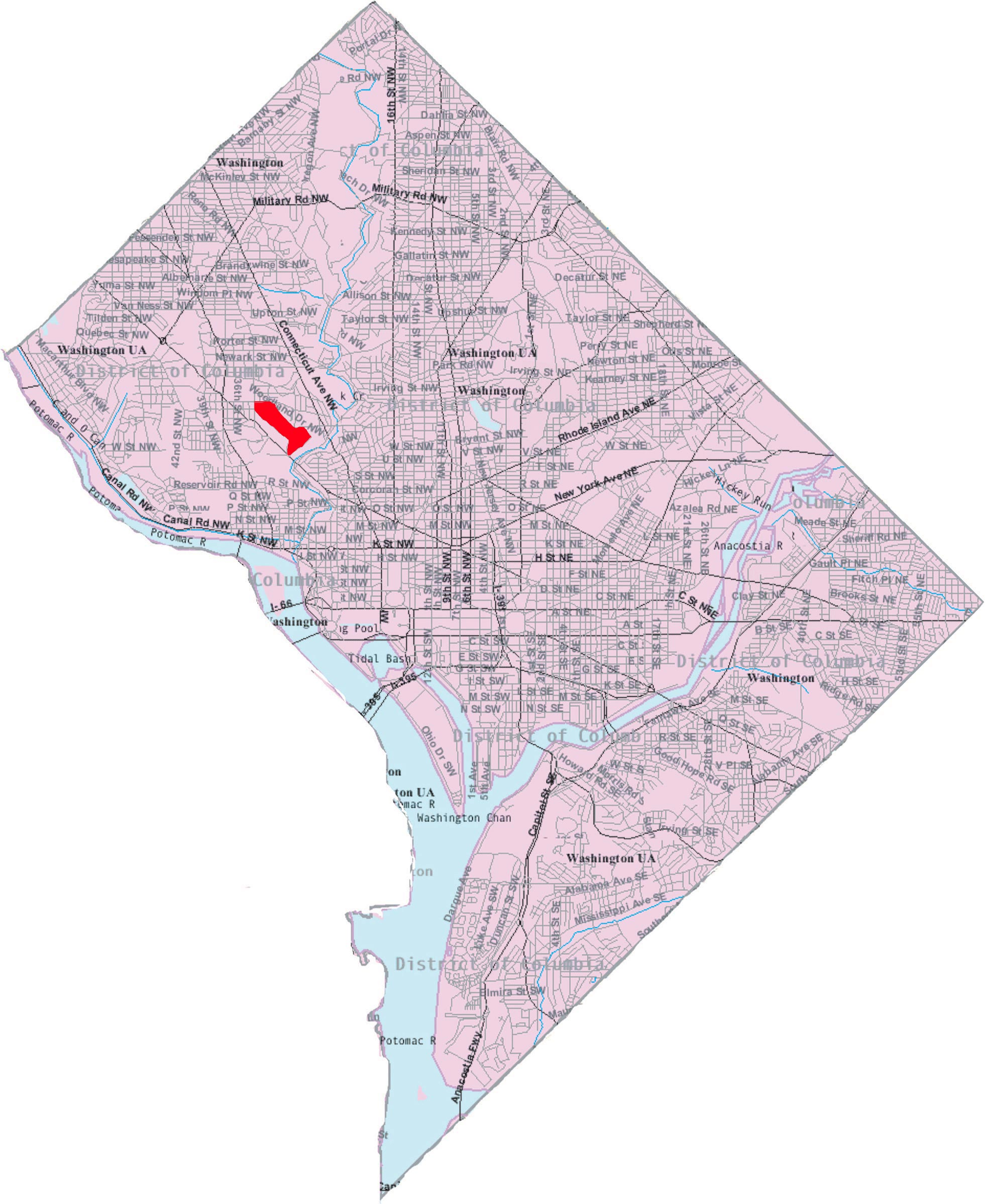
- Map of Washington, D.C., with Woodland-Normanstone highlighted in red
- Coordinates: 38.9207°N 77.0608°W
- Country: United States
- District: Washington, D.C.
- Ward: Ward 3

Government
  - Councilmember: Matthew Frumin

Area
  - Land: 0.331 sq mi (0.86 km^{2})
- Postal code: ZIP code

Woodland Normanstone is a small, affluent, residential neighborhood in Northwest Washington, D.C., adjoining the larger neighborhoods of Woodley Park, Massachusetts Avenue Heights, and Observatory Circle.

The Woodland Normanstone neighborhood is bounded by Garfield Street to the north, Cleveland Avenue and Calvert Street to the northeast, 28th Street to the east, Rock Creek Park to the southeast, Massachusetts Avenue to the southwest, and 34th Street to the west. It is served by the Woodley Park Metro station on the Washington Metro Red Line.

Woodland Normanstone Neighborhood Association, established in 1989, represents the neighborhood. There are no commercial businesses; it consists of detached single-family homes. The neighborhood is not well known elsewhere in the city.

Of the 160 houses in the neighborhood, 24 are residences for embassies. A number of government officials live there. Facebook founder Mark Zuckerberg bought a large house in 2025 costing $23 million, making it the third most expensive house in city history.

== History ==
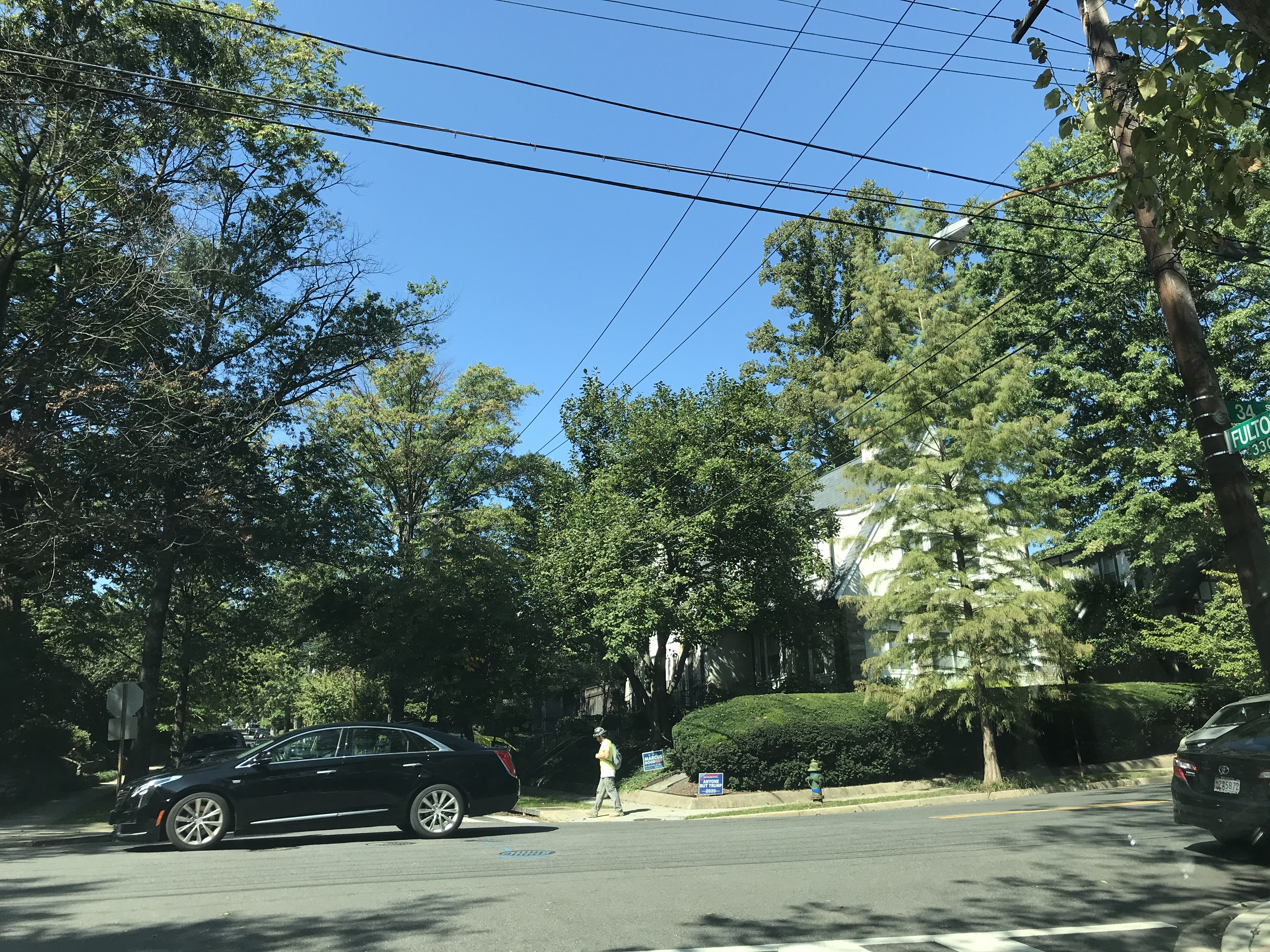
Woodland Normanstone - 34th St NW and Fullton St NW (September 2020)

In the late 19th century, the land was the home of two farms and some woods and trees.

Following approval by the District Commissioners, Massachusetts Avenue was extended by way of a bridge over Rock Creek in 1904.

In 1910, the 61st Congress allowed an exception to the typical street layout to a little bit of wilderness right in the middle of Washington. By curving around the hills, and by preserving the trees rather than cutting them, the developers created a neighborhood unlike most others in D.C.

A group of real estate investors, called the Massachusetts Heights Company, purchased the 212-acre (0.86 km^{2}) area for over $2,000,000 in 1911. At the time of the sale, the new owners said they wanted to convert the wooded area into a "magical city". The land was developed by Amos H. Plumb and American Security and Trust Company. The developers built wide streets that conformed to the natural hilly topography.

In 1917, the land was sold for several million dollars, which was the largest individual sale of real estate in the District of Columbia at the time.
