= McCormick House =

McCormick House may refer to

- McCormick House (Trinidad, Colorado), listed on the National Register of Historic Places in Las Animas County, Colorado
- McCormick House (Washington, D.C.), the residence of the Brazilian ambassador to the United States
