= Monument to the Dead of World War II =

Brazilian war memorial in Rio de Janeiro

- Monumento Nacional aos Mortos da Segunda Guerra Mundial
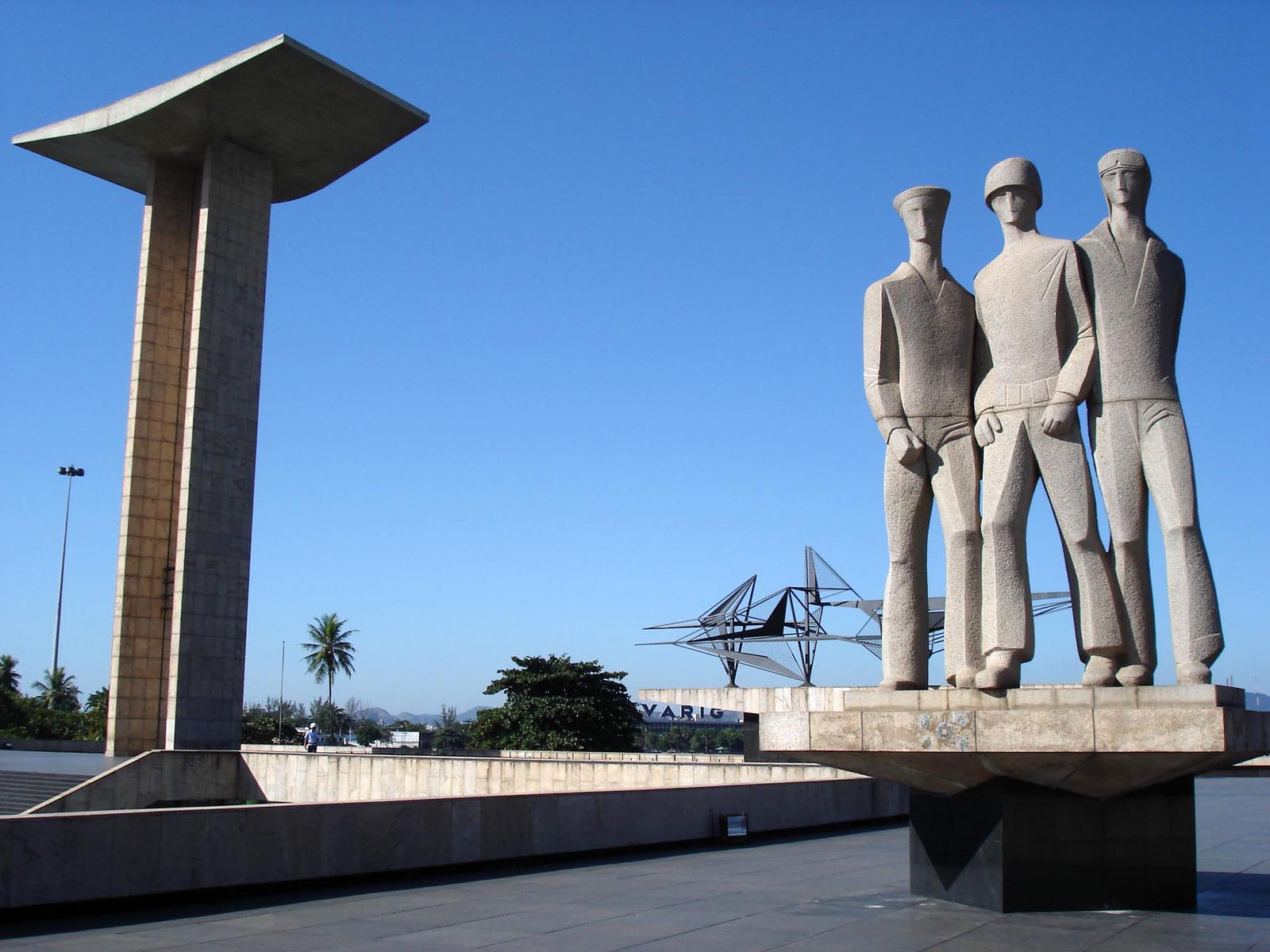
- Concrete portal sculpture and granite statue (foreground), and metal sculpture (background), at the "Monument to the Dead of World War II" in Flamengo Park
- Interactive map of Monument to the Dead of World War II
- Location: Rio de Janeiro, Brazil
- Coordinates: 22°55′00″S 43°10′25″W
- Designer: Mark Netto Konder and Helio Ribas Marinho
- Height: 31 metres (102 ft)
- Completion date: 1960

National Historic Heritage of Brazil
- Designated: 1583
- Reference no.: 2009

The Monument to the Dead of World War II (Portuguese: Monumento Nacional aos Mortos da Segunda Guerra Mundial), also the Monument to the Brazilian Soldiers of World War II, popularly known as Monumento aos Pracinhas commemorates Brazil's participation and losses in the Second World War (WWII).

It is located in Flamengo Park (also known as Aterro do Flamengo and Parque Eduardo Gomes) on Guanabara Bay, in the Flamengo neighborhood of Rio de Janeiro, Brazil.

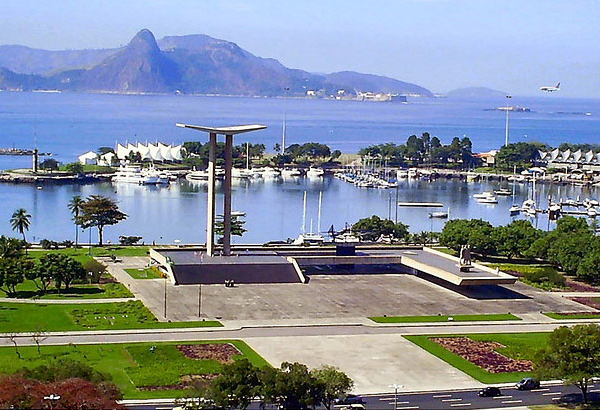
Panorama of the monument, Glória neighbourhood, Rio de Janeiro, Brazil.

== Features ==
=== Buildings ===
The below grade mausoleum holds the remains of 467 servicemen of the Brazilian Expeditionary Force who died in action in Italy during World War II. They were buried at the Brazilian Military Cemetery of Pistoia in Tuscany, Italy, until they were repatriated in 1960. The Tuscan site now honors the servicemen with the Brazilian Monument and Tomb of the Unknown Soldier of World War II, designed by Olavo Redig de Campos.

Long low stone peninsulas support rows of simple marble tablets of the fallen, in a serene minimalist manner.

An adjacent large space has permanent exhibits, films, and documentaries relating to the participation of Brazil in the European Theater of WWII, including images of personnel and equipment of the era.

A long 70 metres (230 ft) by 12 metres (39 ft) glass-bottomed fountain pool above the mausoleum allows natural light and cools the interior temperature.

=== Artworks ===
The "Monument to the Dead of World War II" was designed by architects Mark Netto Konder and Helio Ribas Marinho, the winners of a national competition. The monument construction was completed in 1960.

The primary vertical feature is the monumental portal, an abstract memorial sculpture of formed concrete, that is 31 metres (102 ft) tall.

Other artworks at the Monument include:

- the granite statue by Alfredo Ceschiatti – honoring the personnel of Brazil's land, sea, and air forces.
- the metal abstract sculpture by Júlio Catelli Filho – honoring the Brazilian Air Force.
- the tile mosaic wall mural (1959) by Anisio Medeiros – honoring those of both the navy and merchant marine who died at sea.

== Flamengo Park – adjacent ==
- Carmen Miranda Museum
- Marina da Glória
- Rio de Janeiro Museum of Modern Art – Museu de Arte Moderna (MAM)

== See also ==
- Brazilian Military Cemetery of Pistoia – "Brazilian Monument and Tomb of the Unknown Soldier of World War II" in Italy.
- Brazil in World War II
- Monuments and memorials in Brazil
- Modernist architecture in Brazil
