= Massachusetts Heights =

Neighborhood of Washington, D.C., United States

- Neighborhood of Washington, D.C.
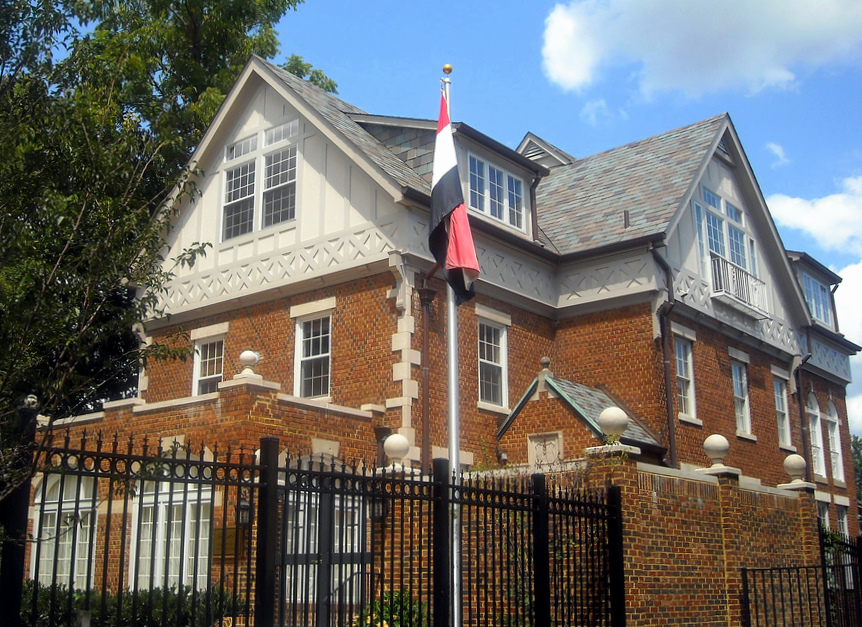
- The Embassy of Iraq in Massachusetts Heights in 2008

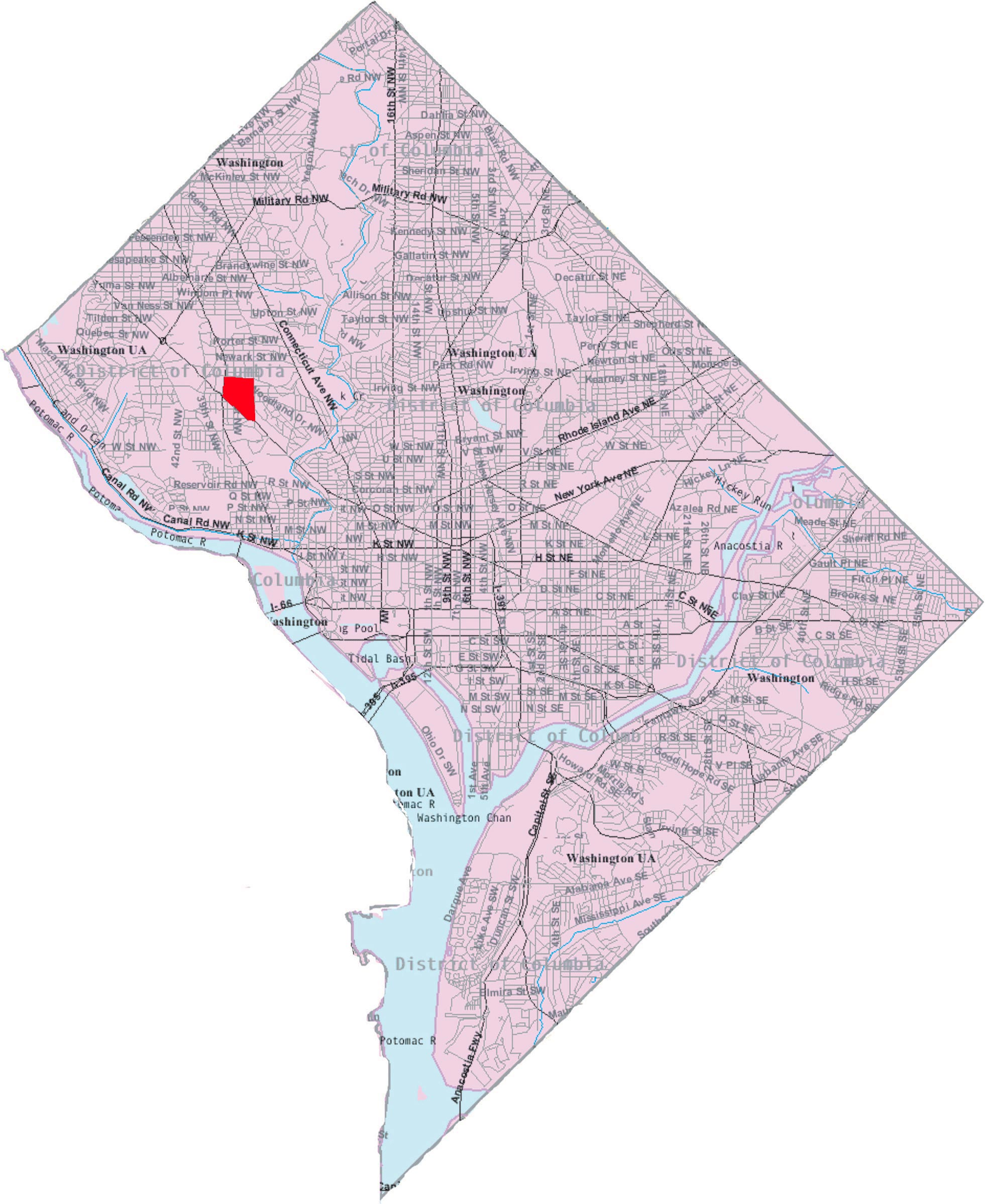
- Map of Washington, D.C., with Massachusetts Heights highlighted in red
- Coordinates: 38.9272°N 77.0692°W
- Country: United States
- District: Washington, D.C.
- Ward: Ward 3

Government
  - Councilmember: Matthew Frumin
- Postal code: ZIP code

Massachusetts Heights is a small neighborhood in Northwest Washington, D.C., dominated by the grounds of the Washington National Cathedral.

The neighborhood is bounded to the north by Woodley Road, to the southwest by Massachusetts Avenue, to the east by 34th Street NW, and to the west by Wisconsin Avenue.

The only residential section of Massachusetts Heights is a small triangular wedge between Massachusetts Avenue and Garfield Street, just adjacent to Observatory Circle and the grounds of the Vice President's Residence. The remainder of the neighborhood is entirely occupied by the Cathedral and its affiliated properties, including St. Albans School, National Cathedral School, and the Beauvoir School.

== Notable residents ==
- George and Kellyanne Conway
