= Pistoia Brazilian war cemetery =

WWII cemetery in Tuscany, Italy

Brazilian Military Cemetery of Pistoia Brazilian Monument and Tomb of the Unknown Soldier of World War II
- Second World War
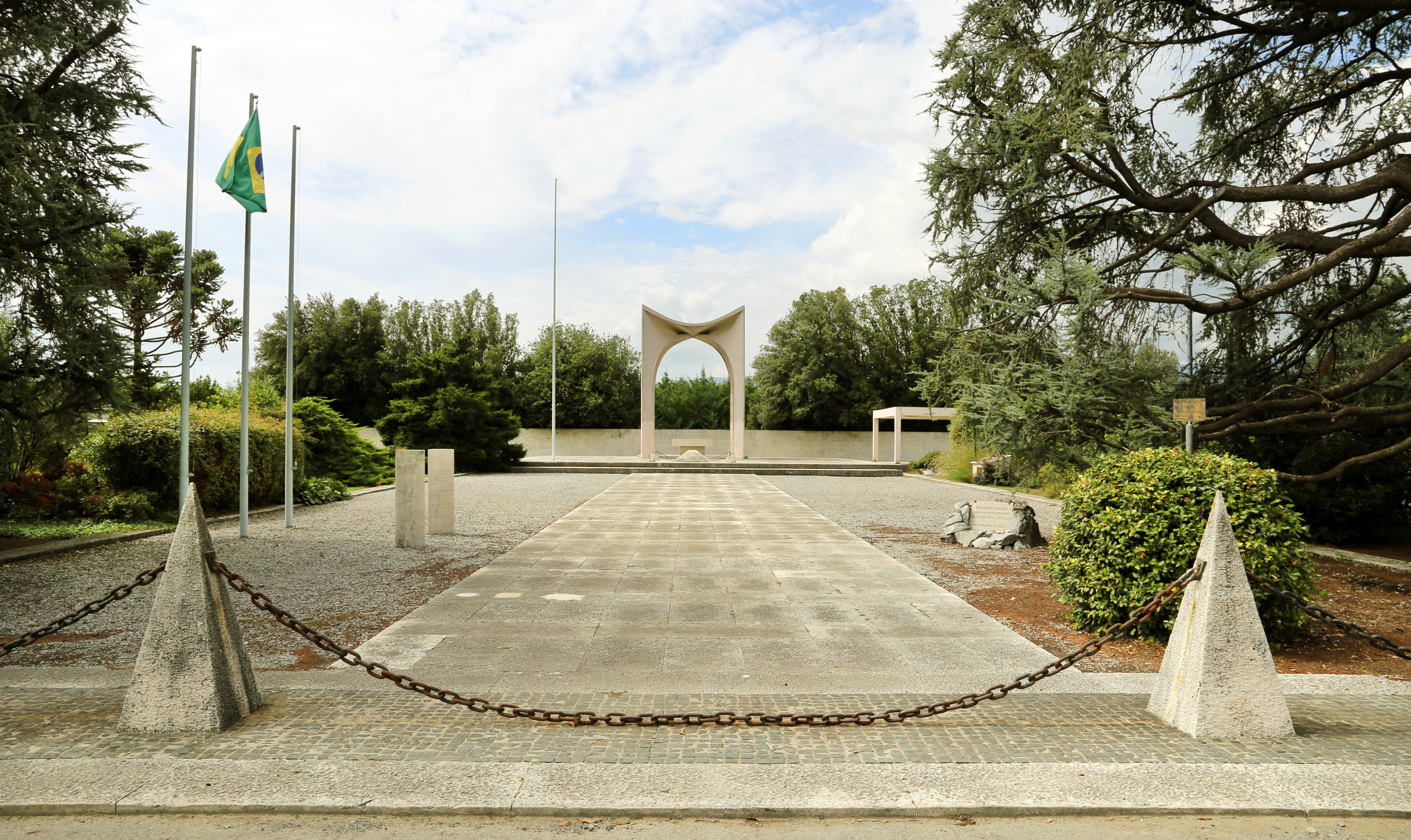
- 1976 Monument and memorial Tomb, at the former cemetery.
- Used for those deceased 1941–1945
- Established: 4 August 1945
- Location: 43.945°N 10.943°E near Pistoia, Tuscany, Italy
- Designed by: Olavo Redig de Campos
- Total burials: 463
- Unknowns: 1

Burials by nation
- Brazil 463

Burials by war
- World War II: 463
- Statistics source: https://www.panoramio.com/photo/12224242 Omaggio al Milite Ignoto del Brasile

The Pistoia Brazilian war cemetery is a former Second World War cemetery located in Pistoia, Toscana, Italy. The cemetery site honors Brazilian soldiers who died in Italy during World War II, the remains of whom were buried here until 1960.

== History ==
In 1944 Brazil participated in the Second World War with 25,000 soldiers of the Brazilian Expeditionary Force against the Axis in the Serchio Valley, in Versilia and in Garfagnana, on the Appennini. In their final advance, the Brazilians reached Turin and on 2 May they joined up with French troops at the border in Susa.

The Pistoia Brazilian war cemetery contained the remains of 463 Brazilian soldiers, most of whom died in the Spring offensive in Italy (Fornovo) in 1945. In 1960, the cemetery was closed and their remains were officially interred in Brazil, with other Brazilian second world war soldiers, at the new National Monument to the Dead of World War II (Monumento Nacional aos Mortos da Segunda Guerra Mundial). It is located on Guanabara Bay in Flamengo Park, in the Flamengo district of Rio de Janeiro.

== Brazilian Monument and Tomb of the Unknown Soldier of World War II ==
After the remains were transferred, the body of a soldier was found remaining in the cemetery. The Brazilian Government chose to leave and honor it there, in a new votive Tomb of the Unknown Soldier.

In 1967 the cemetery reopened with the inauguration of a Modernist votive Brazilian Monument and Tomb of the Unknown Soldier of World War II. The monument's serene site plan: with stone terraces, the votive "Tomb of the Unknown Soldier" memorial, and a sculptural open pavilion; were designed by Brazilian modernist architect Olavo Redig de Campos (1906–1984), a contemporary of Oscar Niemeyer.

The Monument has been visited by two Presidents of Brazil.

== See also ==
- Brazil in World War II
- Brazilian Expeditionary Force
- National Monument to the Dead of World War II – Rio de Janeiro.
- World War II memorials in Italy
