= Northwest (Washington, D.C.) =

- Quadrant
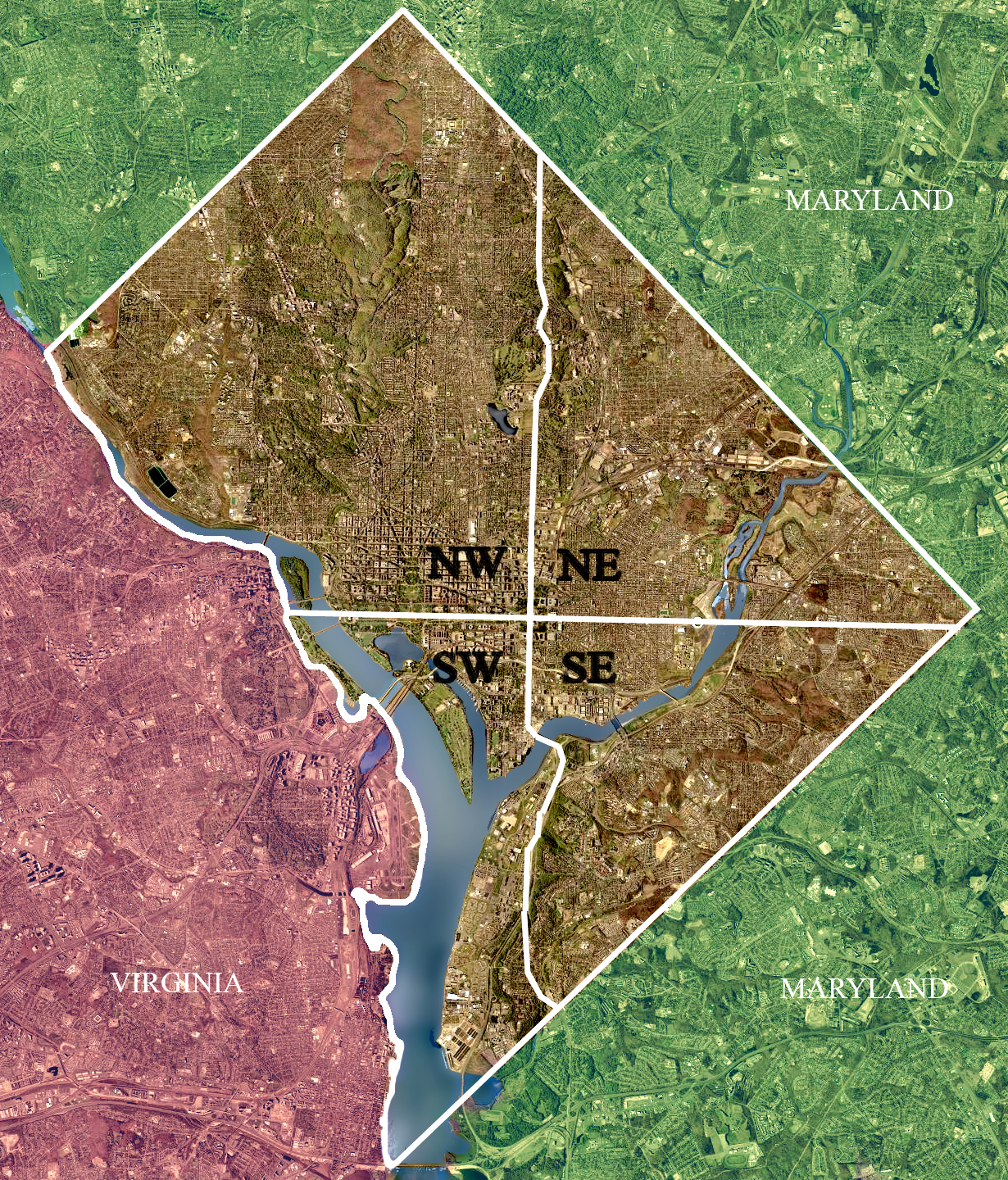
- Color-enhanced USGS satellite image of Washington, D.C. with the crosshairs marking the quadrant divisions of Washington, D.C., with the U.S. Capitol at the center of the dividing lines. To the west of the Capitol extends the National Mall, visible as a slight green band in the image. The Northwest quadrant is the largest, located north of the Mall and west of North Capitol Street.
- Interactive map of Northwest
- Country: United States
- District: Washington, D.C.

Northwest (NW or N.W.) is the northwestern quadrant of Washington, D.C., the capital of the United States, and is located north of the National Mall and west of North Capitol Street. It is the largest of the four quadrants of the city (NW, NE, SW and SE), and it includes the central business district, the Federal Triangle, and the museums along the northern side of the National Mall, as well as many of the District's historic neighborhoods.

Politically, Northwest is made up of parts of Wards 1, 2, 3, 4, 5, and 6, with Wards 1 and 3 being the only wards located entirely within the quadrant. The Northwest is the wealthiest quadrant of the city, particularly west of 16th Street.

== Demographics ==
The population of Northwest is 340,531, based on the data collected in the latest U.S. Census Bureau release. The population is 48.33% male, and 51.67% female. There are 146,397 households, with 57,445 being family households, and 88,951 being non-family households.

== Geography ==
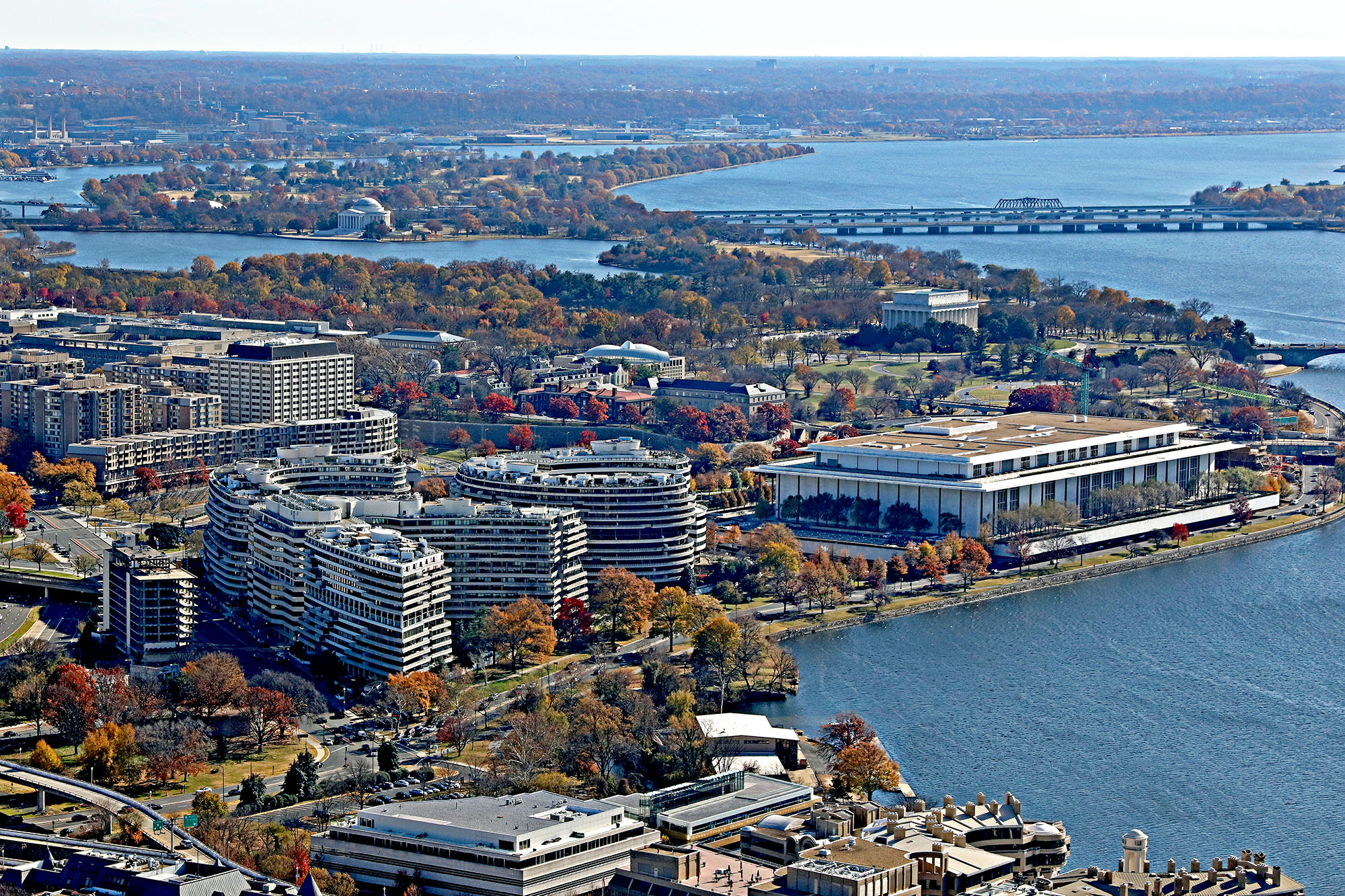
The Watergate complex (left) and the John F. Kennedy Center for the Performing Arts (right) in the Foggy Bottom neighborhood

Northwest Washington, D.C., includes the following 58 neighborhoods:

- Adams Morgan
- American University Park
- Barnaby Woods
- Berkley
- Bloomingdale
- Brightwood
- Burleith
- Cathedral Heights
- Chevy Chase
- Chinatown
- Cleveland Park
- Colonial Village
- Columbia Heights
- Crestwood
- Downtown
- Dupont Circle
- Embassy Row
- Foggy Bottom
- Forest Hills
- Foxhall
- Friendship Heights
- Georgetown
- Glover Park
- Hawthorne
- Judiciary Square
- Sheridan-Kalorama
- Kalorama Triangle
- Kent
- LeDroit Park
- Logan Circle
- Manor Park
- Massachusetts Heights
- McLean Gardens
- Mount Pleasant
- Mount Vernon Square
- Mount Vernon Triangle
- NoMa
- North Cleveland Park
- North Gate
- Observatory Circle
- The Palisades
- Park View
- Penn Quarter
- Petworth
- Pleasant Plains
- Shaw
- Shepherd Park
- Sixteenth Street Heights
- Spring Valley
- Takoma
- Tenleytown
- Truxton Circle
- U Street Corridor
- Wakefield
- West End
- Woodland Normanstone
- Woodley Park

== Landmarks ==
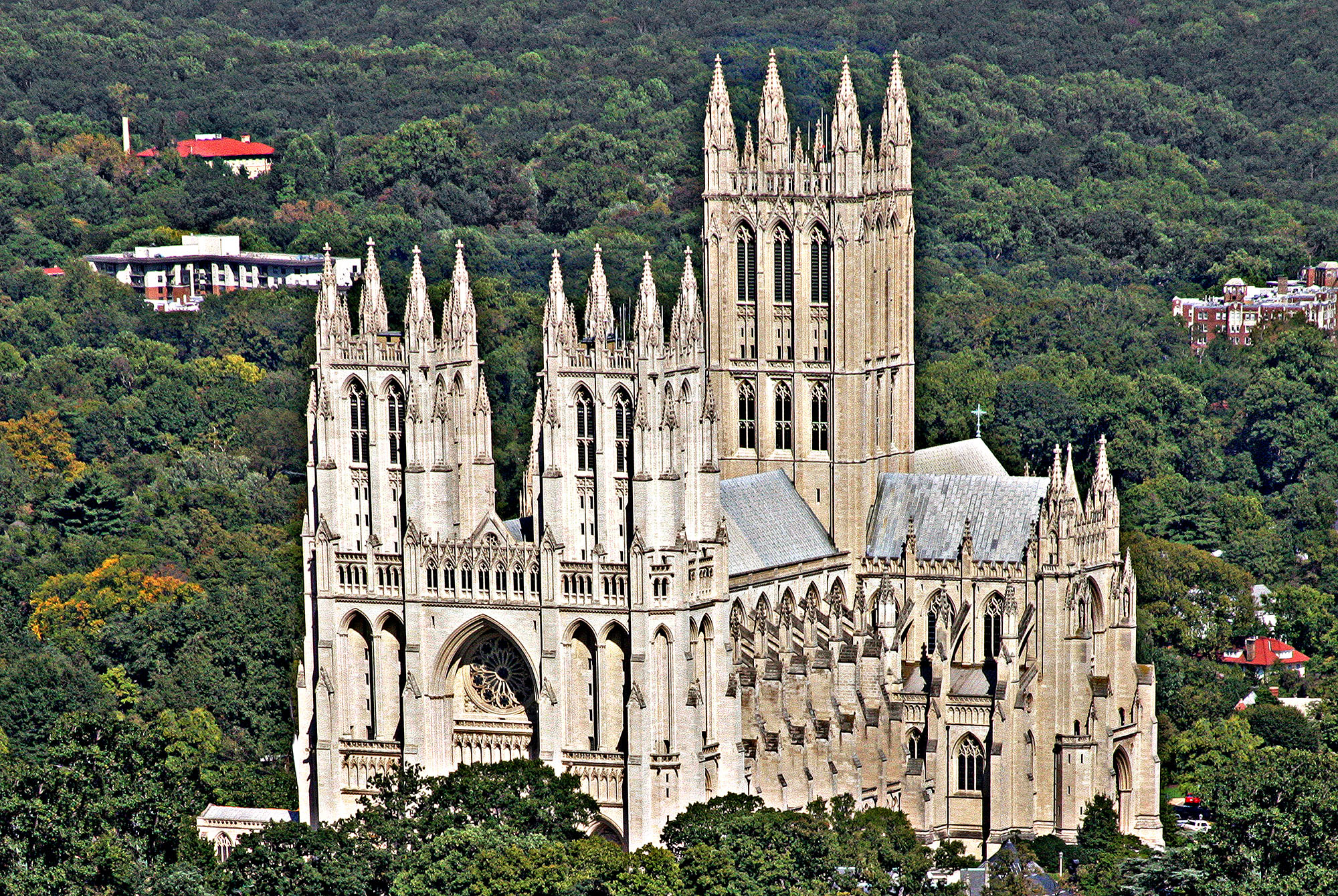
Washington National Cathedral

Northwest contains many college campuses, including American University, George Washington University, Georgetown University, Howard University, and the University of the District of Columbia. Northwest also contains many primary and secondary schools, many of which are public schools administered by DCPS (District of Columbia Public Schools). There are 44 DCPS institutions in Northwest, as well as many private schools, including St. John's College High School, Sidwell Friends School, Gonzaga College High School, Duke Ellington School of the Arts, and Georgetown Day School, among others. The Capital One Arena, home of the Washington Wizards, the Washington Capitals, and the Georgetown Hoyas as well as the venue for many concerts and other events, is located in the District's Chinatown in Northwest. The National Cathedral, the White House, Rock Creek Park, and Embassy Row are also located in this quadrant.

== Transportation ==
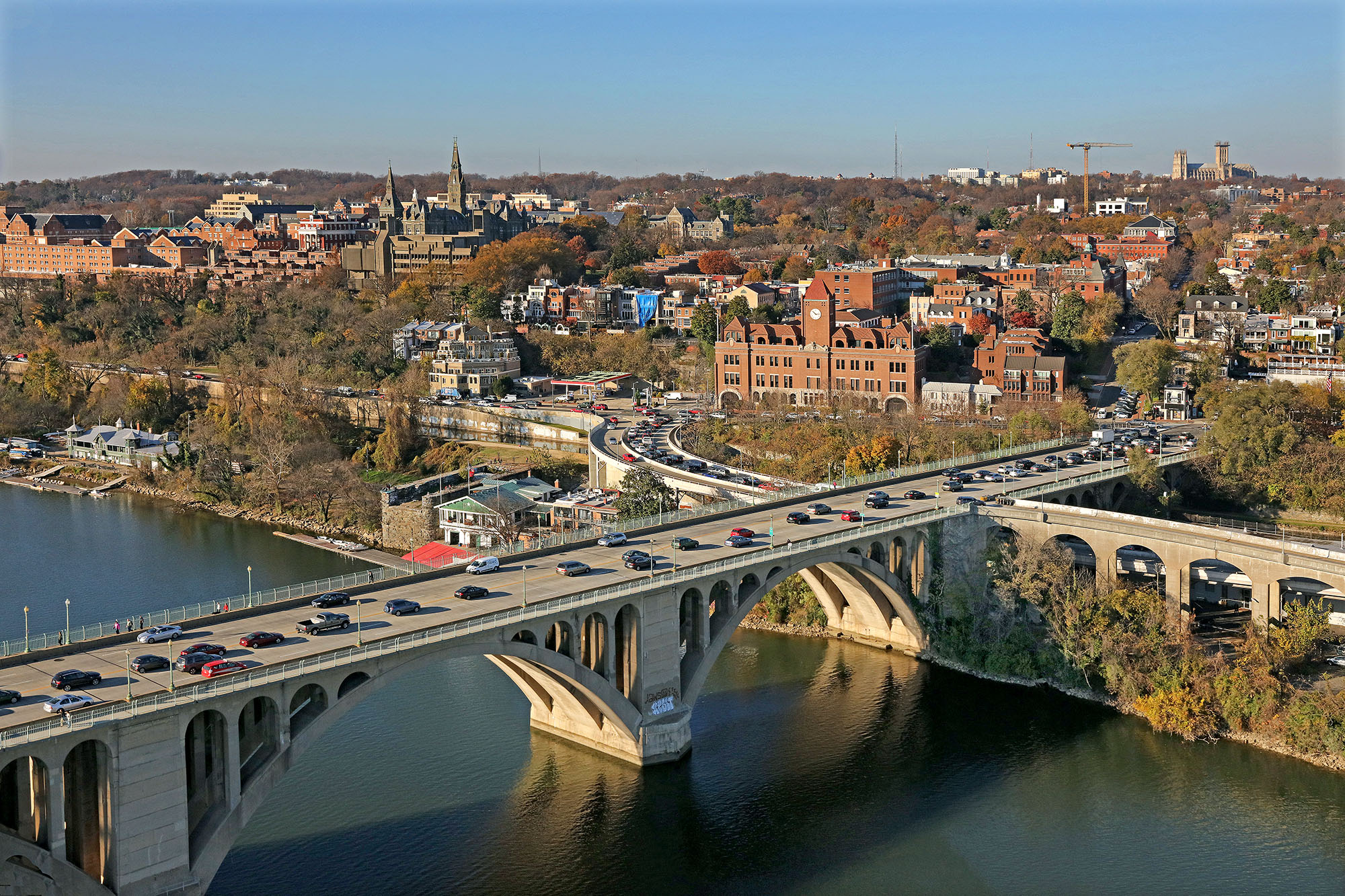
Francis Scott Key Bridge

Northwest is bounded by the Potomac River on the west, Western Avenue and Eastern Avenue to the north, North Capitol Street to the east, and the National Mall to the south. Other principal roads include Connecticut Avenue between Chevy Chase and the White House, Wisconsin Avenue between Friendship Heights and Georgetown, Pennsylvania Avenue between Georgetown and the Capitol, K Street, Massachusetts Avenue (home to Embassy Row), and 16th Street.

Northwest is served by all six lines of the Washington Metro: the Orange, Silver, Red, Blue, Yellow, and Green Lines. Many Metrobus lines run through the quadrant.

== See also ==
- SW – Southwest, Washington, D.C.
- SE – Southeast, Washington, D.C.
- NE – Northeast, Washington, D.C.
