= Olavo Redig de Campos =

Brazilian architect

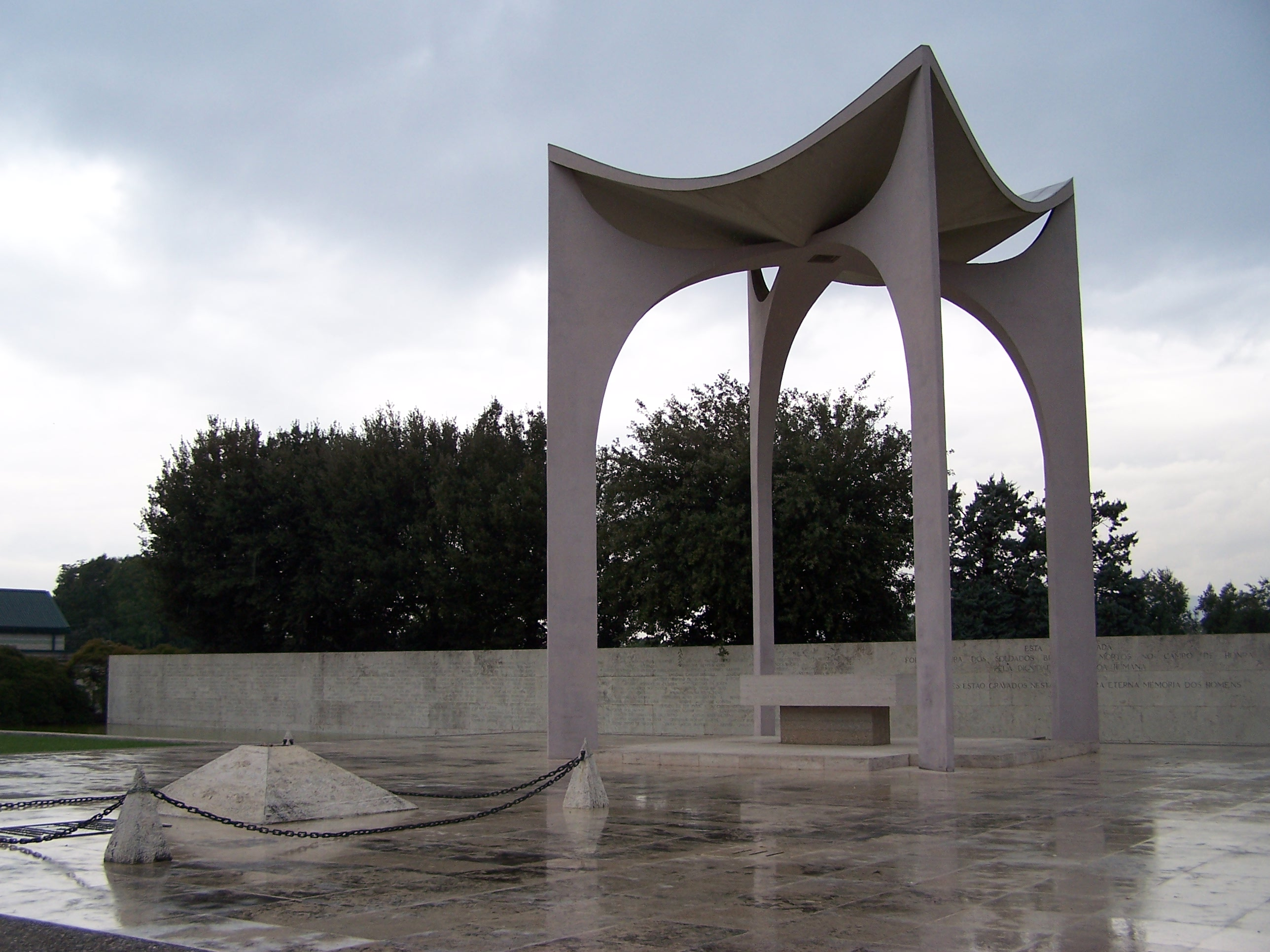
Monument and Tomb of the Unknown Soldier of World War II, Brazilian Military Cemetery of Pistoia.

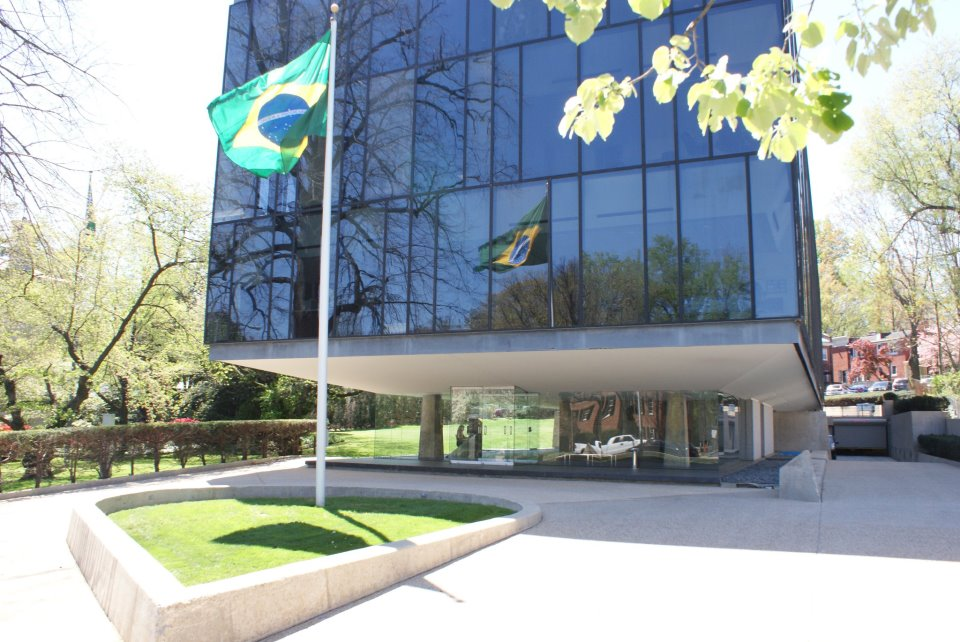
Glass Embassy of Brazil in Washington, D.C.

Olavo Redig de Campos (1906–1984) was a Brazilian architect, important in the 20th century development of the Brazilian style of Modernist architecture.

Redig de Campos was born in Rio de Janeiro, however, his father was a diplomat and he spent part of his childhood in Europe. He studied architecture at the Sapienza University of Rome, at the same time as Gregori Warchavchik and Rino Levi. In 1931 Redig de Campos returned to Brazil.

In 1946, Redig de Campos assumed the presidency of the Serviço de Conservação do Patrimônio do Itamaraty ("Heritage Conservation Service of the Foreign Ministry"), in which capacity he served for thirty years.

== Works ==
Among the projects he designed were the:

- Embassy of Brazil in Washington, D.C., in Lima, and in Buenos Aires.
- Brazilian diplomatic residences in Beirut and Dakar.
- Civic Centre of Curitiba, Brazil
- Legislative Assembly of Paraná, Brazil
- Brazilian Military Cemetery of Pistoia
- Brazilian Monument and Tomb of the Unknown Soldier of World War II

Redig also designed residential dwellings, such as the country house of Geraldo Baptista and the urban home of the Moreira Salles family in Rio de Janeiro. The latter is today the headquarters of the Moreira Salles Institute.

== See also ==
- Modernist architecture in Brazil
