= Massachusetts Avenue (Washington, D.C.) =

Major road in Washington, D.C., U.S.

- Massachusetts Avenue SE; Massachusetts Avenue NE; Massachusetts Avenue NW
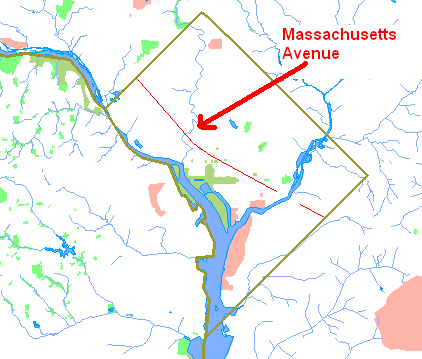
- Massachusetts Avenue's route map
- Interactive map of Massachusetts Avenue
- Maintained by: DDOT
- Width: 160 feet (49 m)
- Location: Washington, D.C., U.S.
- Coordinates: 38°54′50″N 77°3′11″W
- East end: Southern Avenue
- Major junctions: Randle Circle; Lincoln Park; Stanton Park; Columbus Circle; North Capitol Street; I-395 / H Street; Mount Vernon Square; US 29 (11th Street); Thomas Circle; Scott Circle; Dupont Circle; Sheridan Circle; Rock Creek & Potomac Parkway; Wisconsin Avenue; Ward Circle
- West end: Westmoreland Circle

Construction
- Completion: 1871

- Massachusetts Avenue Historic District
- U.S. National Register of Historic Places
- U.S. Historic district
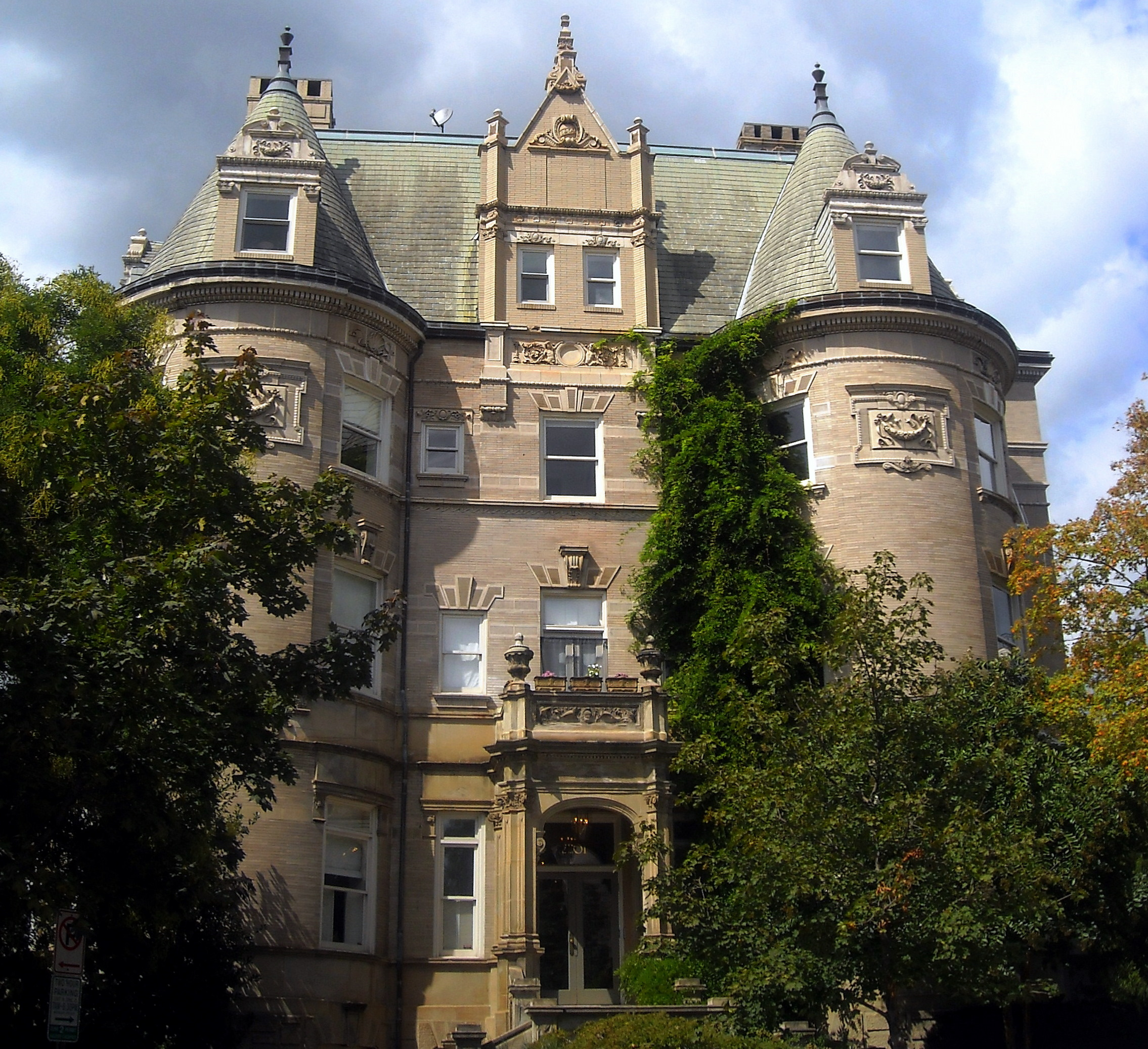
- Miller House, a contributing property to the Massachusetts Avenue Historic District

- Location within Washington, D.C.
- Location: Both sides of Massachusetts Avenue between 17th Street and Observatory Circle, NW
- Coordinates: 38°54′50″N 77°3′11″W
- Area: 81 acres (33 ha)
- Built: 1871
- Architect: Multiple
- Architectural style: Late Victorian, Beaux Arts
- NRHP reference No.: 74002166
- Added to NRHP: October 22, 1974

Massachusetts Avenue is a major diagonal transverse road in Washington, D.C., United States. The Massachusetts Avenue Historic District is a historic district that includes part of it.

Massachusetts Avenue was part of Pierre Charles L'Enfant's original plan for the development of Washington, D.C. The avenue crosses three of Washington, D.C.'s four quadrants. It intersects every major north–south street and passes numerous Washington landmarks. Massachusetts Avenue represents the northern boundary of downtown and the city's Embassy Row.

Massachusetts Avenue is tied with Pennsylvania Avenue as the widest road in Washington, D.C., at 160 feet (49 m). The two roads run in parallel through much of the city, Massachusetts about seven blocks north of Pennsylvania Avenue. Massachusetts Avenue was long considered the city's premier residential street, and Pennsylvania Avenue was its most sought-after business address. The two avenues are named Massachusetts and Pennsylvania, two states that played a leading role in securing American independence in the American Revolution and the subsequent Revolutionary War.

The historic district is an 81-acre (33 ha) area in Northwest Washington, D.C. that includes 150 contributing buildings and three contributing structures. In 1985, Massachusetts Avenue was listed on the National Register of Historic Places. It includes multiple properties that are individually listed on the National Register.

== Route description ==
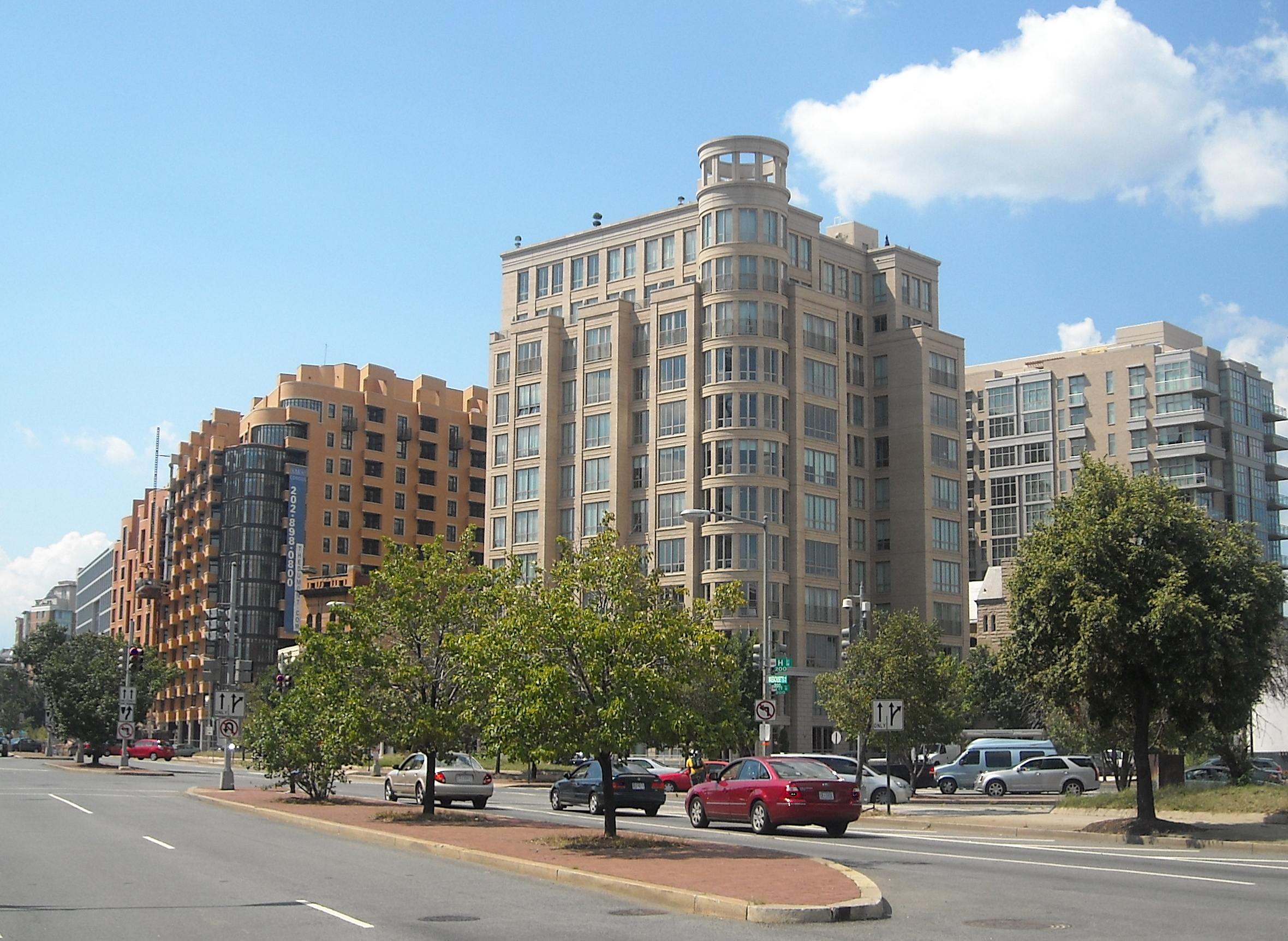
Massachusetts Avenue at the intersection of 3rd and H Streets, NW

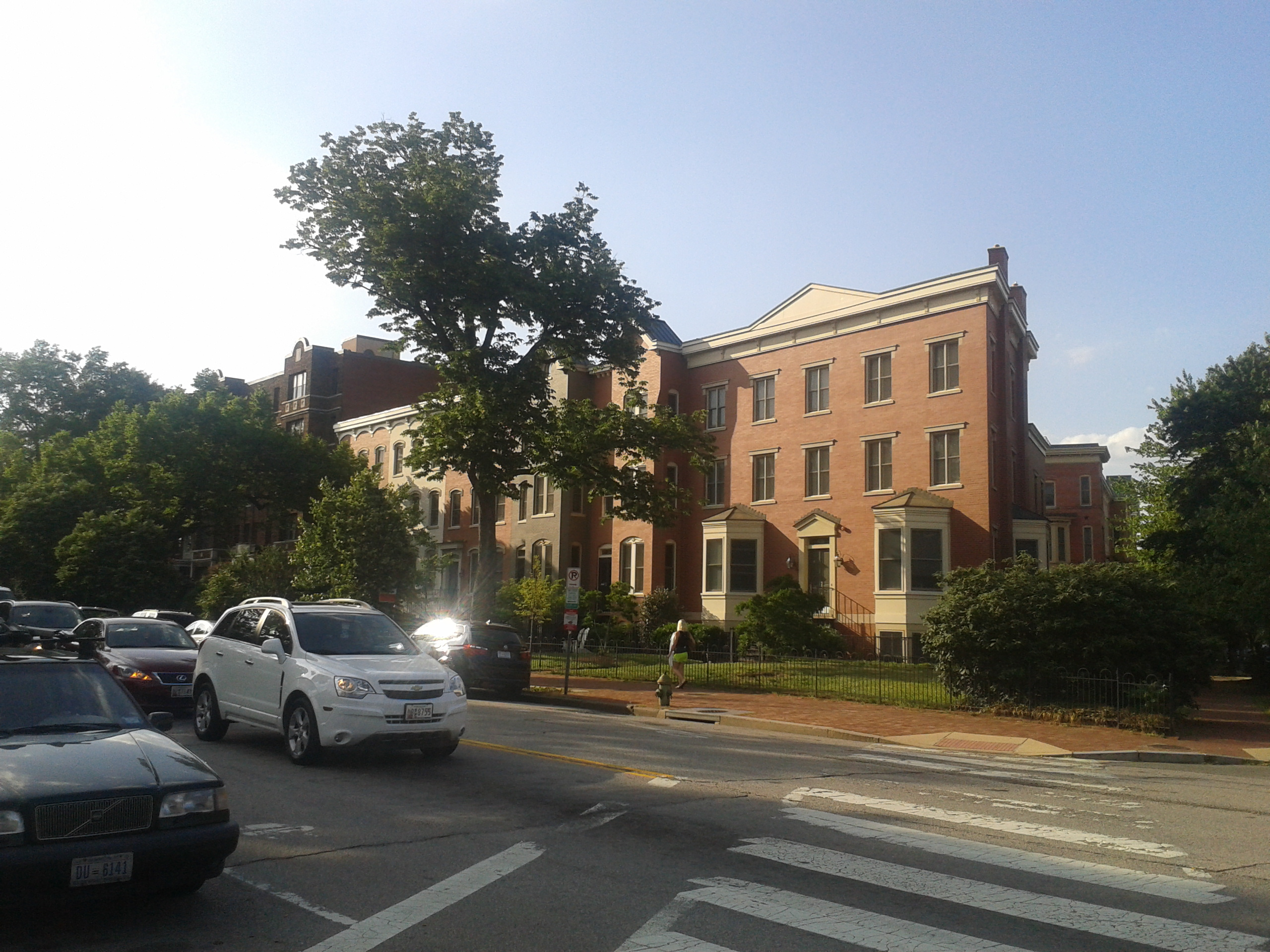
A residential area along Massachusetts Avenue on Capitol Hill

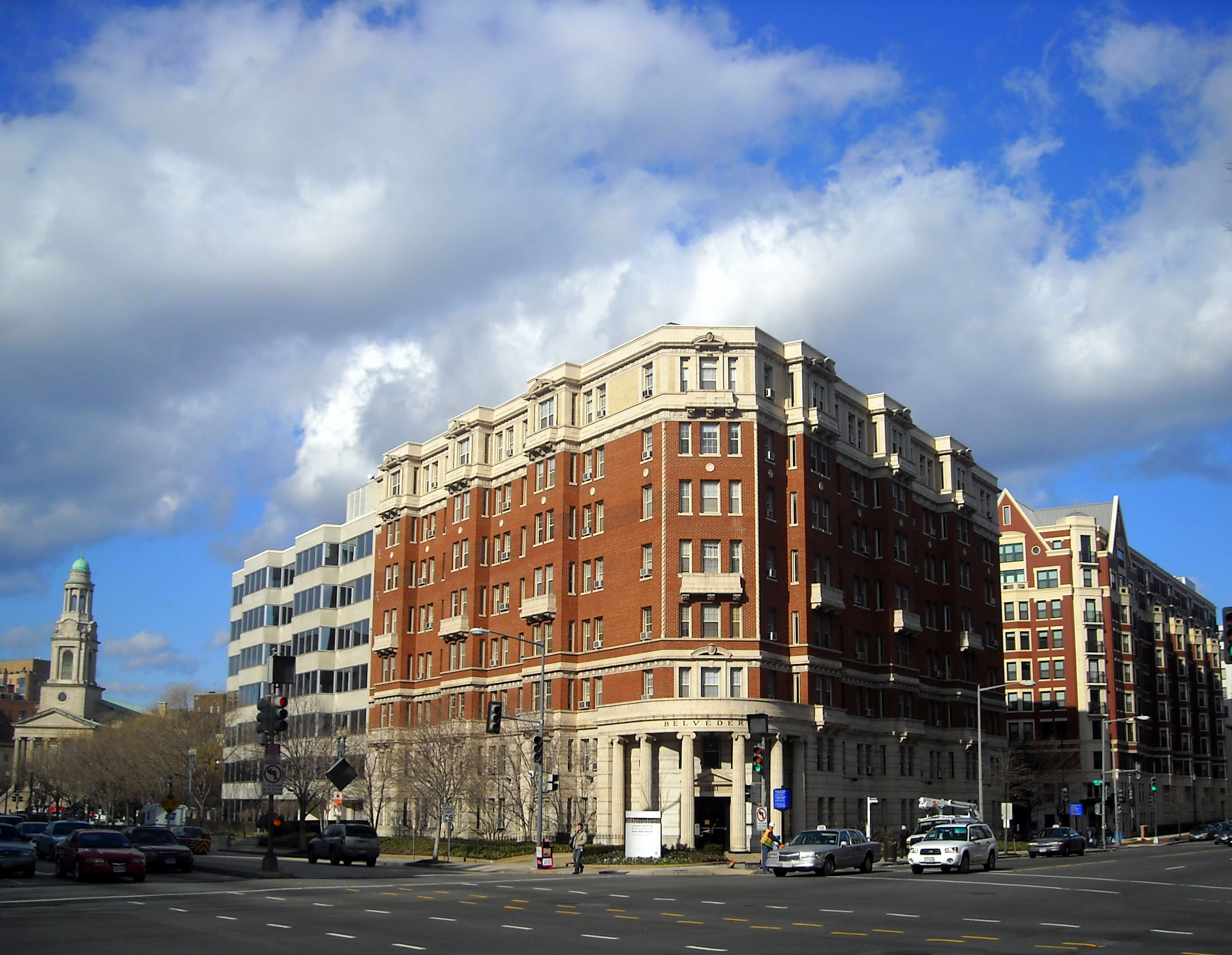
The intersection of 13th Street and Massachusetts Avenue, NW near Thomas Circle

The main section of Massachusetts Avenue begins at 19th Street Southeast, just to the west of the former District of Columbia General Hospital site and one block north of Congressional Cemetery. At the hospital, Massachusetts Avenue commands a view of the Anacostia River. It proceeds in a northwesterly direction crosstown. At 14th Street SE, it enters the neighborhood of Capitol Hill and Lincoln Park in Northeast Washington, D.C.

After briefly converging with Columbus Circle as it curves around Washington Union Station, Massachusetts Avenue enters Northwest Washington, D.C. in a rapidly changing neighborhood which has transitioned from earlier blight and decay to in the 21st century developing numerous high-rise apartment complexes. In the tradition of the acronym SoHo in Manhattan, realtors sometimes refer to this area as NoMa, standing for north of Massachusetts Avenue.

It intersects with Interstate 395, which runs underground at that point, at H Street NW, and passes over Mount Vernon Square in front of the Walter E. Washington Convention Center. Continuing northwest, Massachusetts enters an underpass below Thomas Circle at 14th and M Streets NW, before curving around Scott Circle at 16th and N Streets NW; this is considered the starting point of Embassy Row.

Massachusetts Avenue passes through the inner ring of Dupont Circle and curves north at Sheridan Circle, paralleling Rock Creek to Belmont Road NW. After crossing Rock Creek over Charles C. Glover Memorial Bridge, it curves around the United States Naval Observatory and Number One Observatory Circle, the official residence of the vice President of the United States, which forms the southwest boundary of the Massachusetts Heights neighborhood. Washington National Cathedral, located at the intersection of Massachusetts and Wisconsin Avenues, is usually considered the end of Embassy Row.

At Ward Circle, Massachusetts Avenue delineates the American University Park neighborhood from Spring Valley, passing to the north of American University. It crosses the border between Washington, D.C. and Montgomery County, Maryland at Westmoreland Circle.

In Maryland, the road continues signed as Maryland Route 396, waving through residential sections of Bethesda until terminating at Goldsboro Road, also known as Maryland Route 614. Another section of Massachusetts Avenue, discontinuous from this one, lies on the east side of the Anacostia River. That section extends from 30th Street SE near District of Columbia Route 295, to Southern Avenue SE at the border between Washington, D.C. and Prince George's County.

== Notable institutions ==
Several notable institutions are located on Massachusetts Avenue, including:

- Brookings Institution
- Carnegie Endowment for International Peace
- Cato Institute
- Georgetown University Law Center
- Islamic Center of Washington
- National Trust for Historic Preservation
- Paul H. Nitze School of Advanced International Studies
- Peterson Institute
- Postal Square Building, which houses the Bureau of Labor Statistics and the National Postal Museum
- St Nicholas Cathedral
- The Heritage Foundation

Multiple embassies and residences are located on Massachusetts Avenue, leading to the naming of a section of Massachusetts Avenue as Embassy Row. Several of these embassies are listed on the National Register of Historic Places.

== History ==
=== 19th century ===
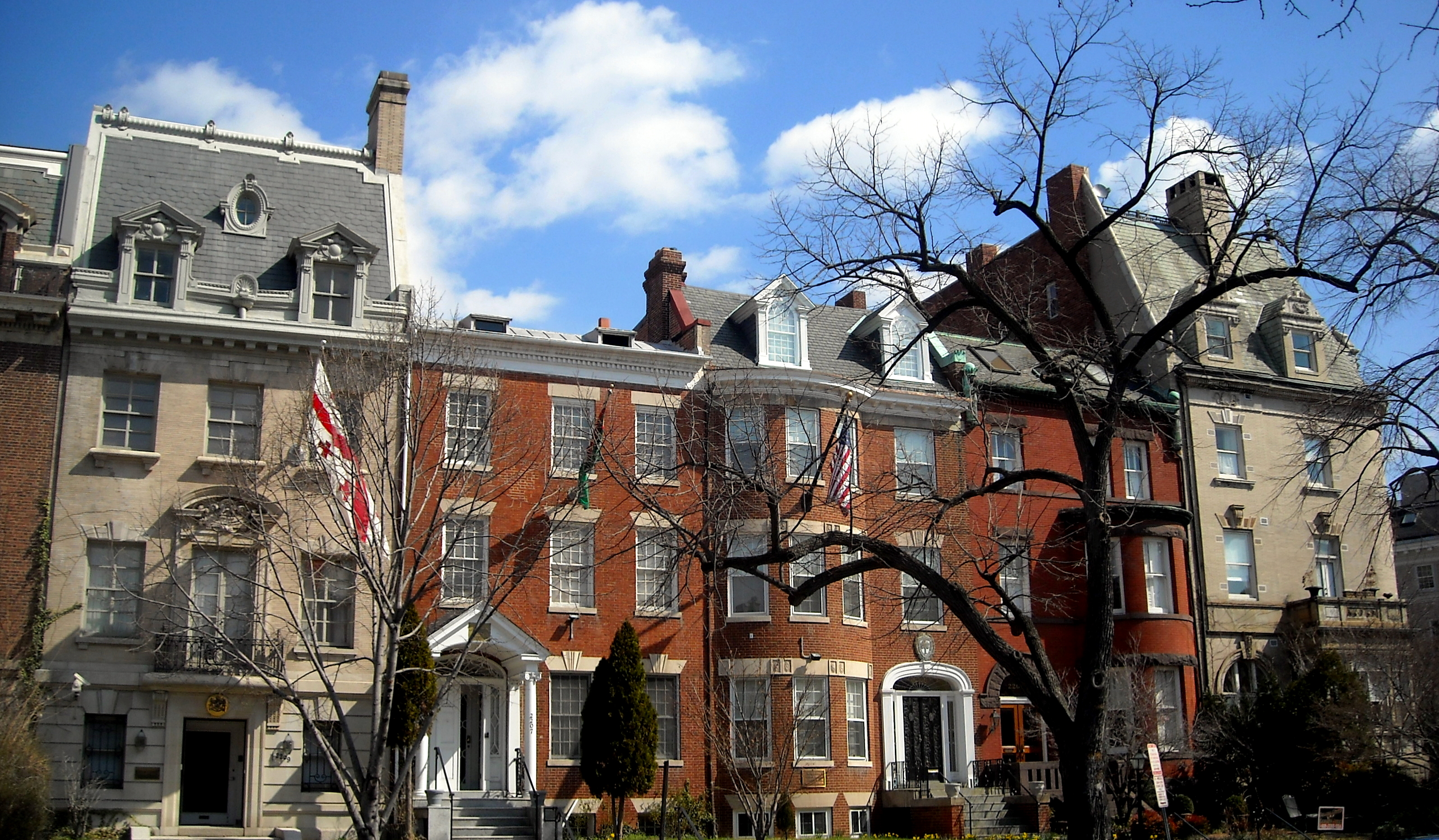
Private residences and embassies on Massachusetts Avenue in the Kalorama neighborhood of Washington, D.C.

The track of the avenue was not paved until the administration of Alexander Robey Shepherd in the early 1870s. It was extended beyond Boundary Road, now Florida Avenue, in the 1880s, and beyond Rock Creek to Wisconsin Avenue after 1900. In 1906, the District Commissioners approved extending it to the District line, although at the time they thought it would really only be used up to its intersection with Nebraska Avenue with the exception of pleasure drives.

In the 1870s, residential development accelerated on Massachusetts Avenue, mostly around the circles located west of 9th Street NW. These brick and brownstone structures reflected the Queen Anne and Richardsonian Romanesque styles in vogue at the time. Luxurious Georgian Revival and Beaux-Arts mansions on Massachusetts Avenuewere late inhabited by wealthy and influential Washingtonians. The section between Sheridan Circle and Scott Circle became known as "Millionaires' Row".

=== 20th century ===
The Great Depression forced many to relinquish their homes on Millionaires' Row. After World War II, Massachusetts Avenue was seen as less fashionable than newer areas such as upper 16th Street. Many residences were sold and demolished to make way for office buildings, particularly around Dupont Circle and to its east. Many others, however, survived as embassies and society houses; the former Millionaires' Row is today well known as Embassy Row.

Several overlapping historic districts have been created to preserve the character of the remaining neighborhoods. The Massachusetts Avenue Historic District encompasses the buildings between 17th Street and Observatory Circle on Massachusetts Avenue NW.

== Transit ==
While no Washington Metro lines run along Massachusetts Avenue, the Metrobus N routes serve upper Northwest while a patchwork of routes serve Downtown, Northeast, and Southeast.

=== Metrobus ===
The following Metrobus routes travel along the street (listed from west to east):

- N4 (Dupont Circle to Westmoreland Circle)
- N6 (Dupont Circle to Westmoreland Circle, making a clockwise-only loop each direction between Idaho Avenue westbound/Cathedral Avenue eastbound and Ward Circle. Runs on weekends and weekdays after 8 PM to replace N2 and N4 service)
- N2 (Dupont Circle to Idaho Avenue westbound/Cathedral Avenue eastbound, crossing again at Ward Circle)
- 80 (North Capitol Street to 2nd Street NW westbound/H Street NW eastbound)
- D6 (Stanton Park to North Capitol St.)
- X8 (Stanton Park to Columbus Circle)
- 96 (D.C. General Hospital to New Jersey Ave NW)
- M6 (Alabama Ave to Southern Ave)

=== Far western and eastern ends ===
Ride On Route 29 serves Massachusetts Avenue in Maryland from Westmoreland Circle to the avenue's terminus at Goldsboro Road.

The M6, which travels from the Potomac Avenue Metro station to Fairfax Village, runs along Massachusetts Avenue between Alabama Avenue and Southern Avenue.

=== Washington Metro ===
The following Metrorail stations have stops located near Massachusetts Avenue:

- Dupont Circle
  Red Line
- Mount Vernon Square
  Green Line
  Yellow Line
- Union Station
  Red Line
- Stadium-Armory
  Blue Line
  Orange Line
  Silver Line

=== Commuter rail ===
Washington Union Station, which is served by Amtrak, MARC, and Virginia Railway Express trains, is located on Massachusetts Avenue at Columbus Circle.

- Amtrak:
  Acela
  Capitol Limited
  Cardinal
  Carolinian
  Crescent
  Northeast Regional
  Palmetto
  Silver Meteor
  Silver Star
  Vermonter
- MARC:
  Brunswick Line
  Camden Line
  Penn Line
- VRE:
  Fredericksburg Line
  Manassas Line

== See also ==
- Charles C. Glover
- Embassy Row
