= Observatory Circle =

Street in Washington, D.C., United States

- Neighborhood of Washington, D.C.
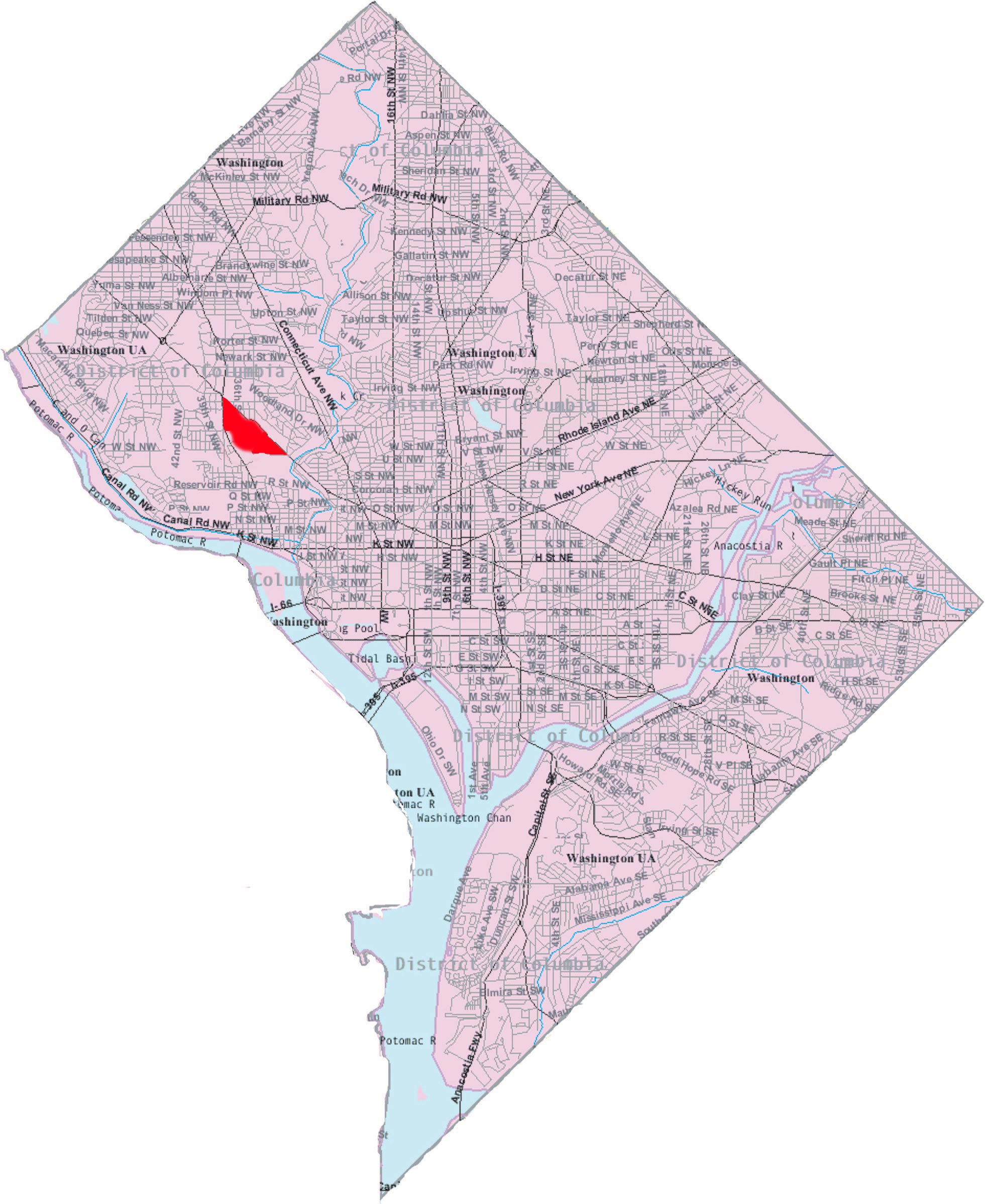
- Map of Washington, D.C., with Observatory Circle highlighted in red
- Coordinates: 38.921°N 77.067°W
- Country: United States
- District: Washington, D.C.
- Ward: Ward 3

Government
  - Councilmember: Matthew Frumin
- Postal code: ZIP code

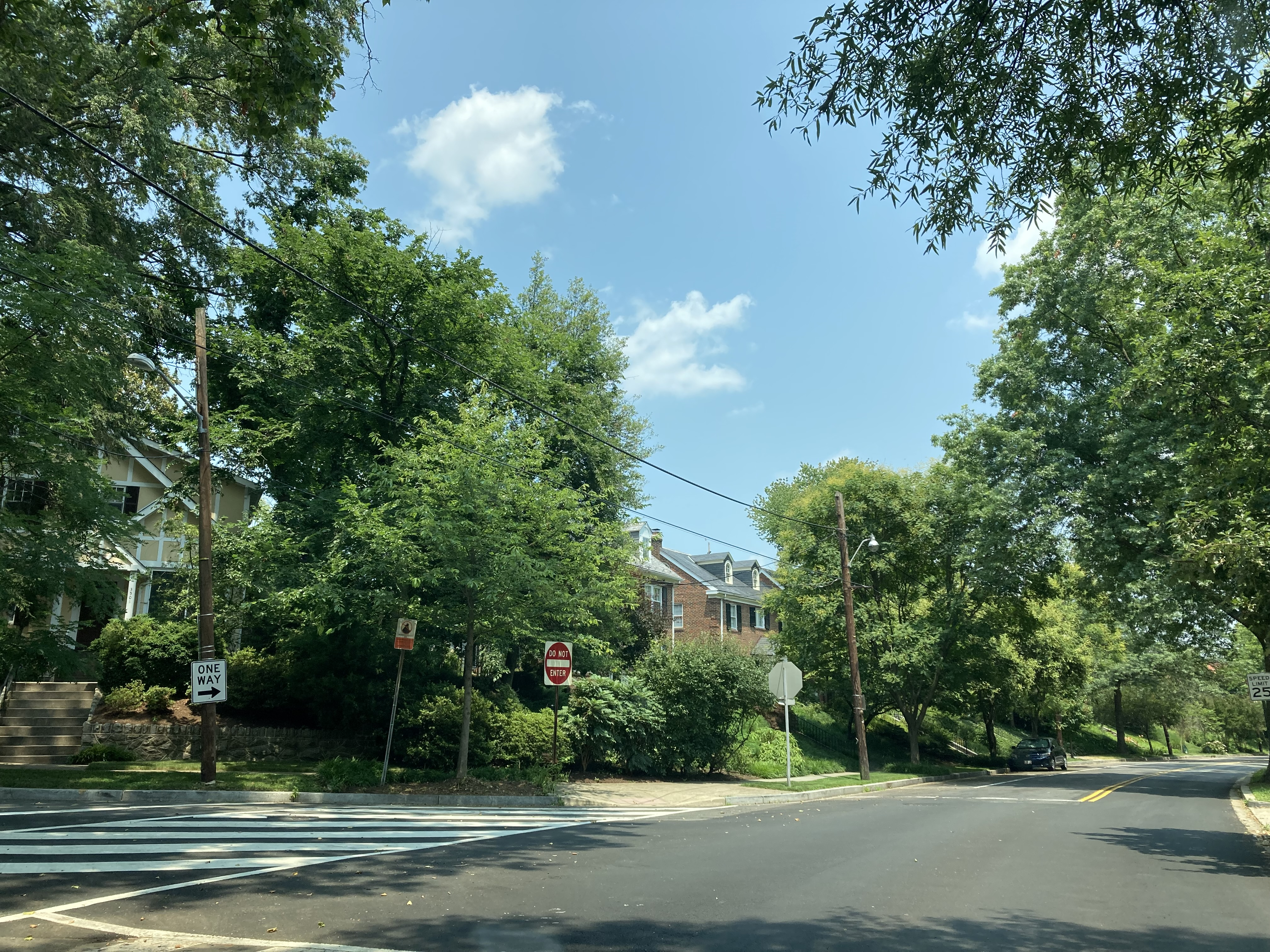
Intersection of Observatory Circle and Davis St. NW, July 2021, in the Observatory Circle neighborhood

Observatory Circle is a street and neighborhood in Washington, D.C. The street runs from Calvert Street to Massachusetts Avenue near 34th Street. Established in 1894, the street follows an incomplete loop, forming an arc rather than a circle. The street surrounds the grounds of the United States Naval Observatory, which includes Number One Observatory Circle, the official residence of the Vice President of the United States. Areas around the Observatory are also referred to as Observatory Circle, bounded on the northeast by Massachusetts Avenue; on the south by Calvert Street, the Observatory Circle property, and Whitehaven Street; and on the west by 37th Street.

The inside of the arc formed by Observatory was blurred on Google Maps.

Massachusetts Avenue completes the northeast side of the circle and is the major thoroughfare of the neighborhood, where it is mostly lined with embassies. Therefore, most of the area is commonly regarded as Embassy Row.

== See also ==
- List of circles in Washington, D.C.
